= Spain at the 2023 European Games =

- Flag of Spain
- IOC code: ESP
- NOC: Spanish Olympic Committee
- Website: www.coe.es

in Kraków and Małopolska, Poland 21 June – 2 July 2023
- Competitors: 306 in 23 sports
- Flag bearers: Carlos Arévalo; Patricia Encinas (opening)
- Medals Ranked 2nd: Gold 21 Silver 17 Bronze 19 Total 57

European Games appearances (overview)
- 2015; 2019; 2023; 2027

Spain competed at the 2023 European Games, in Kraków and Małopolska, Poland, from 21 June to 2 July 2023.

== Medalists ==
Medal	Name	Sport	Event	Date
Gold	Damián Quintero	Karate	Men's individual kata	22 June
Gold	Paola García	Karate	Women's individual kata	22 June
Gold	Spain national beach handball team	Beach handball	Men's tournament	22 June
Gold	Carlos Arévalo; Saúl Craviotto; Rodrigo Germade; Marcus Walz	Canoe sprint	Men's K-4 500 metres	23 June
Gold	Cristina Arambula; Berta Ferreras; Marina García; Meritxell Mas; Alisa Ozhogina; Paula Ramírez; Sara Saldaña; Iris Tió; Blanca Toledano	Artistic swimming	Team technical	23 June
Gold	Daniel Arce	Athletics	Men's 3000 metres steeplechase	23 June
Gold	Hugo Arillo	Taekwondo	Men's -54 kg	23 June
Gold	Adriana Cerezo	Taekwondo	Women's -49 kg	23 June
Gold	Adrián Vicente	Taekwondo	Men's -58 kg	23 June
Gold	Pablo Graña; Antía Jácome	Canoe sprint	Mixed C-2 200 metres	24 June
Gold	Mohamed Katir	Athletics	Men's 1500 metres	24 June
Gold	Javier Pérez	Taekwondo	Men's -68 kg	24 June
Gold	Mireia Hernández; Dennis González Boneu	Artistic swimming	Mixed duo free	24 June
Gold	Cristina Arambula; Berta Ferreras; Marina García; Meritxell Mas; Alisa Ozhogina; Paula Ramírez; Sara Saldaña; Iris Tió; Blanca Toledano	Artistic swimming	Team free	25 June
Gold	Miguel Alvariño; Elia Canales	Archery	Mixed Recurve Team	25 June
Gold	Thierry Ndikumwenayo	Athletics	Men's 5000 metres	25 June
Gold	Noa Canovas; Daniel Santigosa	Padel	Mixed Doubles	25 June
Gold	Daniel Santigosa; David Gala	Padel	Men's Doubles	25 June
Gold	David Llorente; Miquel Travé; Pau Echaniz	Canoe Slalom	Men's K1 Team	29 June
Gold	Spain women's national beach soccer team	Beach soccer	Women's tournament	1 July
Gold	Carolina Marín	Badminton	Women's singles	2 July
Silver	Emma García; Dennis González Boneu	Artistic swimming	Mixed duet technical	22 June
Silver	Paula Grande Martínez; Jesús Oviedo Berenguer	Shooting	Mixed team 10 metre air rifle	22 June
Silver	Cayetano García; Pablo Martínez	Canoe sprint	Men's C-2 500 m	22 June
Silver	María Corbera; Antía Jácome	Canoe sprint	Women's C-2 500 m	22 June
Silver	Spain women's national beach handball team	Beach handball	Women's tournament	22 June
Silver	María Corbera	Canoe sprint	Women's C-1 500 m	24 June
Silver	Miguel Alvariño; Pablo Acha; Andrés Temiño	Archery	Men's Recurve Team	24 June
Silver	Alma Pérez	Taekwondo	Women's -53 kg	24 June
Silver	Cecilia Castro Burgos	Taekwondo	Women's -67 kg	25 June
Silver	Marta Barrera; Marta Caparrós	Padel	Women's Doubles	25 June
Silver	Alonso Rodríguez; Pablo García	Padel	Men's Doubles	25 June
Silver	Elia Canales	Archery	Women's recurve individual	28 June
Silver	Miguel Alvariño	Archery	Men's recurve individual	29 June
Silver	Laura Heredia	Modern Pentathlon	Women's individual	1 July
Silver	Miquel Travé	Canoe Slalom	Men's C1	2 July
Silver	José Quiles	Boxing	Men's 57 kg	2 July
Silver	Mohammed Hamdi	Kickboxing	Men's full contact -86kg	2 July
Bronze	Valeria Antolino; Alberto Arévalo; Carlos Camacho; Rocío Velázquez	Diving	Team event	22 June
Bronze	Pablo Graña	Canoe sprint	Men's C-1 200 metres	23 June
Bronze	María Corbera	Canoe sprint	Women's C-1 200 metres	23 June
Bronze	María Torres	Karate	Women's +68kg	23 June
Bronze	Enrique Llopis	Athletics	Men's 110 metres hurdles	24 June
Bronze	Jaël Bestué; Paula Sevilla; Paula García; Carmen Marco	Athletics	Women's 4x100 metres	24 June
Bronze	Joan Jorquera	Taekwondo	Men's -63 kg	24 June
Bronze	Cecilia Muhate; Helena Oma; Alba Prieto; Natalia Rodríguez	3x3 Basketball	Women's tournament	24 June
Bronze	Araceli María Martínez; David Gala	Padel	Mixed Doubles	25 June
Bronze	Daniel Quesada Barrera	Taekwondo	Men's -74 kg	25 June
Bronze	Raúl Martínez	Taekwondo	Men's -87 kg	26 June
Bronze	Ana Carvajal; Valeria Antolino	Diving	Women's 10 m synchro platform	27 June
Bronze	Manuel Bargues	Fencing	Men's -87 kg	27 June
Bronze	Spain national rugby sevens team	Rugby sevens	Men's tournament	27 June
Bronze	Pablo Acha	Archery	Men's recurve individual	29 June
Bronze	Enmanuel Reyes	Boxing	Men's 92 kg	30 June
Bronze	Laura Fuertes	Boxing	Women's 50 kg	30 June
Bronze	Rubén Iglesias	Kickboxing	Men's light contact -63kg	1 July
Bronze	Spain national beach soccer team	Beach soccer	Men's tournament	1 July

== Competitors ==
The following is the list of number of competitors participating in the Games. Spain has representation in all sports except for Ski jumping, Sport climbing and Teqball

Sport	Men	Women	Total
3x3 Basketball	4	4	8
Archery	4	2	6
Artistic swimming	2	11	13
Athletics	23	23	46
Badminton	1	3	4
Beach handball	12	12	24
Beach soccer	12	12	24
Boxing	7	4	11
Breaking	1	1	2
Canoe slalom	5	6	11
Canoe sprint	11	10	21
Cycling BMX	1	1	2
Mountain Biking	4	2	6
Diving	4	3	7
Fencing	12	12	24
Judo	4	4	8
Karate	2	3	5
Kickboxing	2	1	3
Modern Pentathlon	3	2	5
Muaythai	1	3	4
Padel	4	4	8
Rugby sevens	13	13	26
Shooting	5	7	12
Table tennis	2	2	4
Taekwondo	8	8	16
Triathlon	3	3	6
Total	150	156	306

== Archery ==
Individual Events

Athlete	Event	Ranking round		Round of 64	Round of 32	Round of 16	Quarterfinal	Semi-final	Final / BM	
Athlete	Event	Score	Seed	Opposition Score	Opposition Score	Opposition Score	Opposition Score	Opposition Score	Opposition Score	Rank
Pablo Acha	Men's recurve	673	14	Bye	Wise (GBR); W 6-2	Orton (GBR); W 6-2	Valladont (FRA); W 6-4	Unruh (GER); L 1-7	Olaru (MDA); W 7-1	3rd place, bronze medalist(s)
Miguel Alvariño	Men's recurve	676	8	Bye	Ovchynnikov (UKR); W 6-4	Duchon (SVK); W 6-5	Gazoz (TUR); W 6-4	Olaru (MDA); W 6-4	Unruh (GER); W 6-2	2nd place, silver medalist(s)
Andrés Temiño	Men's recurve	674	12	Bye	Olaru (MDA); L 2-6	Did not advanced				
Elia Canales	Women's recurve	670	4	Bye	Umer (SLO); W 6-0	Adiceom (FRA); W 6-2	Horackova (CZE); W 6-4	Pavlova (UKR); W 6-5	Healey (GBR); L 2-6	2nd place, silver medalist(s)
Ramón López	Men's compound	702	10	—N/a		Bosansky (SVK); L 144-146	Did not advanced			
Andrea Muñoz	Women's compound	702	7	—N/a		Raab (GER); W 145-143	Gellenthien (DEN); L 141-146	Did not advanced		

Team events

Athlete	Event	Ranking round		Round of 32	Round of 16	Quarterfinal	Semi-final	Final / BM	
Athlete	Event	Score	Seed	Opposition Score	Opposition Score	Opposition Score	Opposition Score	Opposition Score	Rank
Pablo Acha; Miguel Alvariño; Andrés Temiño	Men's recurve	2023	3	—N/a		Ukraine (UKR); W 5-1	Switzerland (SUI); W 5-1	Italy (ITA); L 1-5	2nd place, silver medalist(s)
Miguel Alvariño; Elia Canales	Mixed recurve	1013	5	Bye	Austria (AUT); W 6-2	Turkey (TUR); W 6-2	Germany (GER); W 6-2	Ukraine (UKR); W 5-1	1st place, gold medalist(s)
Ramón López; Andrea Muñoz	Mixed compound	1053	7	—N/a	Bye	Turkey (TUR); L 148-155	Did not advanced		

== Artistic swimming ==
Athlete	Event	Qualification		Final	
Athlete	Event	Points	Rank	Points	Rank
Alisa Ozhogina; Iris Tió	Duet technical	—N/a		231.7116	7
Alisa Ozhogina; Iris Tió	Duet free	210.200	4 Q	193.5145	6
Emma García; Dennis González	Mixed duet technical	—N/a		216.5867	2nd place, silver medalist(s)
Mireia Hernández; Dennis González	Mixed duet free	—N/a		210.3918	1st place, gold medalist(s)
Cristina Arambula; Berta Ferreras; Marina García; Meritxell Mas; Alisa Ozhogina; Paula Ramírez; Sara Saldaña; Iris Tió; Blanca Toledano	Team technical	—N/a		278.4066	1st place, gold medalist(s)
Cristina Arambula; Berta Ferreras; Marina García; Meritxell Mas; Alisa Ozhogina; Paula Ramírez; Sara Saldaña; Iris Tió; Blanca Toledano	Team free	303.275	1 Q	261.6374	1st place, gold medalist(s)

== Athletics ==
Spain is set to compete in the first division of the 2023 European Athletics Team Championships which is going to be held in Chorzów during the Games.

Team	Event		Event points																			Total	Rank
Team	Event		100m	200m	400m	800m	1500m	5000m	110m h*	400m h	3000m SC	4 × 100 m	4 × 400 m**	SP	JT	HT	DT	PV	HJ	TJ	LJ	Total	Rank
Spain	Team Championships First Division	Men	5; 12th	11; 6th	10; 7th	9; 8th	16; 1st	16; 1st	15; 2nd	5; 12th	16; 1st	12; 5th	6; 11th	12; 5th	10; 7th	5; 12th	11; 4th	1; 16th	5; 12th	8; 9th	12; 5th	352	4th
Spain	Team Championships First Division	Women	13; 4th	8; 9th	3; 14th	12; 5th	16; 1st	14; 3rd	11; 6th	5; 12th	14; 3rd	14; 3rd	6; 11th	5; 12th	5; 12th	9; 8th	4; 13th	4; 13th	5; 12th	10; 7th	14; 3rd	352	4th

key: h: hurdles; SC; Steeplechase: SP; Shot put: JT: Javelin: HT: Hammer: DT: Discus: PV: Pole vault: HJ: High jump: TJ: Triple Jump: LJ: Long Jump

- Women compete at 100 metre hurdles, rather than 110 metre hurdles.
- 4 x 400 metres is held as a single mixed sex event

=== Individual events ===
As a participant in the Team event, each nation automatically enters one athlete in each of the individual events.

Event	Male Athlete	Score	Rank	Female athlete	Score	Rank
100 m	Sergio López	10.40	17	Jaël Bestué	11.25	5
200 m	Pol Retamal	20.86	9	Paula Sevilla	23.23	12
400 m	Iñaki Cañal	45.51	9	Laura Bueno	53.38	24
800 m	Adrián Ben	1:47.36	10	Lorea Ibarzabal	2:00.86	9
1500 m	Mohamed Katir	3:36.95	1st place, gold medalist(s)	Esther Guerrero	4:11.77	6
5000 m	Thierry Ndikumwenayo	13:25.48	1st place, gold medalist(s)	Águeda Marqués	15:31.04	4
110/100 m h	Enrique Llopis	13.44	3rd place, bronze medalist(s)	Teresa Errandonea	13.22	12
400m h	Jesús David Delgado	50.78	18	Carla García	57.13	16
3000m SC	Daniel Arce	8:25.88	1st place, gold medalist(s)	Marta Serrano	9:41.86	7
4 × 100 m	Bernat Canet; Sergio López; Arnau Monné; Pablo Montalvo	38.83	5	Jaël Bestué; Paula García; Carmen Marco; Paula Sevilla	43.13	3rd place, bronze medalist(s)
4 × 400 m (mixed)	—N/a			Carmen Aviles; Laura Bueno; Iñaki Cañal; Óscar Husillos	3:16.79	15
High jump	Carlos Rojas	2.09	23	Una Stancev	1.80	21
Pole vault	Isidro Leyva	5,10	22	Maialen Axpe	4.25	16
Long Jump	Héctor Santos	7.77	8	Fátima Diame	6.56	6
Triple Jump	Pablo Torrijos	15.57	14	Ana Peleteiro	13.67	9
Shot put	Carlos Tobalina	20.19	10	Belén Toimil	15.32	17
Discus	Yasiel Sotero	61.19	11	June Kintana	50.64	24
Hammer	Alberto González	68.23	20	Laura Redondo	67.05	13
Javelin	Manu Quijera	75.08	13	Arantza Moreno	51.02	21

== Badminton ==
Spain entered four badminton players at the Games.

Athlete	Event	Group stage				Round of 16	Quarter-finals	Semi-finals	Final	
Athlete	Event	Opposition Score	Opposition Score	Opposition Score	Rank	Opposition Score	Opposition Score	Opposition Score	Opposition Score	Rank
Luis Enrique Peñalver	Men's singles	Dwicahyo (AZE); L (16–21, 21–17, 14–21)	Bosniuk (UKR); W (21–19, 21–17)	Yanakiev (BUL); L (13–21, 19–21)	3	Did not advance				
Carolina Marín	Women's singles	Stadelmann (SUI); W (21–10, 19–21, 21–13)	Vargová (SVK); W (13–2, ret.)	Polikarpova (ISR); W (21–15, 21–8)	1 Q	Schmidt (LUX); W (21–9, 21–12)	Kuuba (EST); W (21–10, 21–10)	Gilmour (GBR); W (21–13, 21–11)	Blichfeldt (DEN); W (21–15, 21–14)	1st place, gold medalist(s)
Clara Azurmendi; Beatriz Corrales	Women's doubles	Azzahra / Maftuha (AZE); W (21–5, 21–17)	Au Yeong / Hochmeir (AUT); W (15–21, 21–11, 21–8)	Jille / Seinen (NED); L (12–21, 17–21)	2 Q	—N/a	G Stoeva / S Stoeva (BUL); L (14–21, 14–21)	Did not advance		

== Basketball 3x3 ==
Team	Event	Group stage				Quarterfinals	Semifinals	Final / BM	
Team	Event	Opposition Score	Opposition Score	Opposition Score	Rank	Opposition Score	Opposition Score	Opposition Score	Rank
Jon Galarza; Nacho Martín; Carlos Martínez; Unai Mendicote	Men's tournament	Latvia; L 12-21	Slovenia; W 21-17	Belgium; L 14-21	3	Did not advanced			
Cecilia Muhate; Helena Oma; Alba Prieto; Natalia Rodríguez	Women's tournament	Israel; W 21-12	Netherlands; W 21-8	Switzerland; W 22-9	1 Q	Austria; W 19-16	France; L 11-20	Romania; W 21-15	3rd place, bronze medalist(s)

== Beach Handball ==
Team	Event	Group stage				Quarterfinals / Pl	Semifinals / Pl	Final / BM / Pl	
Team	Event	Opposition Score	Opposition Score	Opposition Score	Rank	Opposition Score	Opposition Score	Opposition Score	Rank
Spain	Men's tournament	Denmark; W 2-0	Norway; L 0-2	Poland; W 2-0	2 Q	Germany; W 2-1	Denmark; W 2-1	Hungary; W 2-1	1st place, gold medalist(s)
Spain	Women's tournament	Poland; L 1-2	Denmark; L 0-2	Norway; W 2-1	2 Q	Greece; W 2-1	Norway; W 2-0	Denmark; L 1-2	2nd place, silver medalist(s)

== Beach Soccer ==
Team	Event	Group stage				Semifinals / Pl	Final / BM / Pl	
Team	Event	Opposition Score	Opposition Score	Opposition Score	Rank	Opposition Score	Opposition Score	Rank
Spain	Men's tournament	Portugal; L 5-7	Poland; W 6–1	Azerbaijan; W 7–1	2	Italy; L 5–6 (a.e.t.)	Portugal; W 5-5 (p)	3rd place, bronze medalist(s)

Team	Event	Group stage			Semifinals / Pl	Final / BM / Pl	
Team	Event	Opposition Score	Opposition Score	Rank	Opposition Score	Opposition Score	Rank
Spain	Women's tournament	Italy; W 0-0 (p)	Ukraine; W 6-4	1	Poland; W 3–2	Ukraine; W 2-2 (p)	1st place, gold medalist(s)

== Boxing ==
Men

Athlete	Event	Round of 64	Round of 32	Round of 16	Quarterfinal	Semi-final	Final	
Athlete	Event	Opposition Result	Opposition Result	Opposition Result	Opposition Result	Opposition Result	Opposition Result	Rank
Martin Molina	-51 kg	—N/a	Vieru (MDA); W RSC R2	Mari (IRL); W 5-0	Gumus (TUR); L 0-5	Did not advance		
José Quiles	-57 kg	—N/a	Gavae (ROU); W 5-0	Çiftçi (TUR); W 5-0	Gomtsyan (GEO); W 4-1	Usturoi (BEL); W 5-0	Ibáñez (BUL); L 0-5	2nd place, silver medalist(s)
Adrián Thiam	-63 kg	—N/a	Guruli (GEO); L 2–3	Did not advance				
Youba Sissokho	-71 kg	Madiev (GEO); L 0–4	Did not advance					
Gazimagomed Jalidov	-80 kg	—N/a	Szczepaniak (POL); W 5-0	Cavallaro (ITA); L 1-4	Did not advance			
Emmanuel Reyes	-92 kg	—N/a	Bouafia (FRA); W 4-1	Manasyan (ARM); W 5-0	Okafor (GER); W 5-0	Marley (IRL); L 1-4	Did not advance	3rd place, bronze medalist(s)
Ayoub Ghadfa	+92 kg	—N/a	Zavatin (MDA); W 5-0	Lovchynskyi (UKR); W 5-0	Tiafack (GER); L 2-3	Did not advance		

Women

Athlete	Event	Round of 32	Round of 16	Quarterfinal	Semi-final	Final	
Athlete	Event	Opposition Result	Opposition Result	Opposition Result	Opposition Result	Opposition Result	Rank
Laura Fuertes	-52 kg	Bye	Rosshaug (DEN); W 3-0	Soares (POR); W 5-0	Lkhadiri (FRA); L 0-3	Did not advance	3rd place, bronze medalist(s)
Mary Romero	-54 kg	Gojkovic (MNE); W 4-1	Davison (GBR); L 0-5	Did not advance			
Jennifer Fernández	-57 kg	Bye	Basanets (UKR); W 5-0	Testa (ITA); L 0-5	Did not advance		
Nayara Arroyo	-60 kg	Bye	Okhrei (UKR); L 1-4	Did not advance			

== Breakdancing ==
Athlete	Event	Preliminary Round		Quarterfinals	Semifinals	Final	
Athlete	Event	Votes	Seed	Opposition Score	Opposition Score	Opposition Score	Rank
Juan De la Torre (Xak)	B-Boys'						
Ana Ortega (Furia)	B-Girls'						

== Canoeoing ==
Men's events

Athlete	Event	Heats		Semi-final		Final	
Athlete	Event	Time	Rank	Time	Rank	Time	Rank
Pablo Graña	C-1 200 metres	39.519	1 QF	Bye		39.852	3rd place, bronze medalist(s)
Adrián Sieiro	C-1 500 metres	1:51.210	3 QF	Bye		1:47.344	6
Cayetano García; Pablo Martínez	C-2 500 metres	1:40.427	2 QF	Bye		1:40.513	2nd place, silver medalist(s)
Carlos Garrote	K-1 200 metres	35.080	5 QSF	36.141	4	Did not advance	
Íñigo Peña	K-1 500 metres	1:43.100	5 QSF	1:40.543	7 QFB	1:39.447	11
Carlos Garrote; Lázaro López	K-2 500 metres	1:39.504	5 QSF	1:32.908	5	Did not advance	
Carlos Arévalo; Saúl Craviotto; Rodrigo Germade; Marcus Walz	K-4 500 metres	1:20.713	1 QF	Bye		1:19.964	1st place, gold medalist(s)

Women's events

Athlete	Event	Heats		Semi-final		Final	
Athlete	Event	Time	Rank	Time	Rank	Time	Rank
María Corbera	C-1 200 metres	46.594	2 QF	Bye		47.441	3rd place, bronze medalist(s)
María Corbera	C-1 500 metres	—N/a				2:03.990	2nd place, silver medalist(s)
María Corbera; Antia Jácome	C-2 500 metres	1:58.285	1 QF	Bye		1:58.506	2nd place, silver medalist(s)
Elisa Zapata	K-1 200 metres	42.659	4 QSF	42.900	4	Did not advance	
Isabel Contreras	K-1 500 metres	1:57.360	5 QSF	1:55.905	4 QFB	1:54.787	14
Cristina Franco; Miriam Vega	K-2 500 metres	1:45.981	8 QSF	1:47.242	6	Did not advance	
Carla Corral; Nerea García; Bárbara Pardo; Lucía Val	K-4 500 metres	1:36.008	4 QSF	1:35.939	4	Did not advance	

Mixed events

Athlete	Event	Heats		Semi-final		Final	
Athlete	Event	Time	Rank	Time	Rank	Time	Rank
Pablo Graña; Antia Jácome	C-2 200 metres	40.210	1 QF	Bye		39.413	1st place, gold medalist(s)
Isabel Contreras; Carlos Garrote	K-2 200 metres	35.745	3 QSF	34.464	2 QF	35.208	5

Qualification legend: SF – Qualify to semifinal; FA – Qualify to medal final; FB – Qualify to non-medal final

== Cycling ==
=== Mountain bike ===
Athlete	Event	Time	Rank
David Campos	Men's cross country	1:22:10	19
Jofre Cullell	Men's cross country	1:24:09	36
Pablo Rodríguez	Men's cross country	1:22:38	24
David Valero	Men's cross country	1:20:11	5
Nuria Bosch	Women's cross country	+1LAP	43
Natalia Fischer	Women's cross country	+1LAP	50

=== BMX (park) ===
Athlete	Event	Qualification		Final	
Athlete	Event	Points	Rank	Points	Rank
Pol Díaz	Men's BMX park	57.66	24	Did not advance	
Teresa Fernández-Miranda	Women's BMX park	55.16	7 Q	64.00	6

== Diving ==
Men

Athlete	Event	Qualification		Final	
Athlete	Event	Points	Rank	Points	Rank
Adrián Abadía	1 m springboard	308.30	17	Did not advanced	
Alberto Arévalo	1 m springboard	346.20	9 Q	377.95	6
Alberto Arévalo	3 m springboard	376.30	13	Did not advanced	
Nicolás García Boissier	3 m springboard	375.10	15	Did not advanced	
Carlos Camacho	10 m platform	374.65	5 Q	368.20	7
Adrián Abadía; Nicolás García Boissier	Synchronized 3 m springboard	—N/a		384.06	5

Women

Athlete	Event	Qualification		Final	
Athlete	Event	Points	Rank	Points	Rank
Rocío Velázquez	1 m springboard	215.55	14	Did not advanced	
Rocío Velázquez	3 m springboard	250.15	12 Q	272.55	8
Valeria Antolino	10 m platform	258.65	9 Q	223.00	11
Ana Carvajal	10 m platform	230.85	13	Did not advanced	
Valeria Antolino; Ana Carvajal	Synchronized 10 m platform	—N/a		261.48	3rd place, bronze medalist(s)

Mixed

Athlete	Event	Final	
Athlete	Event	Points	Rank
Carlos Camacho; Rocío Velázquez	Mixed synchronized 3 m springboard	266.52	5
Valeria Antolino; Carlos Camacho	Mixed synchronized 10 m platform	274.86	4
Valeria Antolino; Alberto Arévalo; Carlos Camacho; Rocío Velázquez	Team event	381.45	3rd place, bronze medalist(s)

== Fencing ==
Men's

Athlete	Event	Preliminaries		Round of 64	Round of 32	Round of 16	Quarterfinals	Semifinals	Final / BM	
Athlete	Event	V/B	Rank	Opposition Score	Opposition Score	Opposition Score	Opposition Score	Opposition Score	Opposition Score	Rank
Manuel Bargues	Épée	3/3	39 q	Bodoczi (GER); W 15-11	Housieaux (BEL); W 15-14	Duduc (SVK); W 15-11	Ibáñez (ESP); W 15-9	Tulen (NED); L 12-15	Did not advanced	3rd place, bronze medalist(s)
Álvaro Ibáñez	Épée	3/3	49 q	Van Nunen (NED); W 15-10	Andrásfi (HUN); W 15-11	Reizlin (UKR); W 15-13	Bargues (ESP); L 9-15	Did not advanced		
Yulen Pereira	Épée	Did not start								
Juan Pedro Romero	Épée	4/2	29 q	Oroian (ROU); W 15-12	Makiienko (UKR); W 9-8	Bayard (SUI); L 10-15	Did not advanced			
Ignacio Breteau	Foil	4/2	26 q	Nijs (BEL); L 15-12	Did not advanced					
Roger García-Alzórriz	Foil	3/3	38 q	Goren (ISR); L 11-15	Did not advanced					
Carlos Llavador	Foil	6/0	6 Q	Bye	Reichetzer (AUT); L 8-15	Did not advanced				
Esteban Peressini	Foil	1/5	63	Did not advanced						
Iñaki Bravo	Sabre	3/3	29 q	Akbarov (AZE); W 15-9	Szilagyi (HUN); L 2-15	Did not advanced				
Óscar Fernández	Sabre	1/5	50	Did not advanced						
Andrés Hernández	Sabre	2/3	32 q	Pagkalos (GRE); L 14-15	Did not advanced					
Santiago Madrigal	Sabre	5/0	3 Q	Bye	Stasiak (POL); W 15-14	Ursachi (ROU); L13-15	Did not advanced			

Women's

Athlete	Event	Preliminaries		Round of 64	Round of 32	Round of 16	Quarterfinals	Semifinals	Final / BM	
Athlete	Event	V/B	Rank	Opposition Score	Opposition Score	Opposition Score	Opposition Score	Opposition Score	Opposition Score	Rank
Sofía Cisneros	Épée	3/3	35 q	Fernández (ESP); W 15-13	Krieger (SUI); L 12-15	Did not advanced				
Sara Fernández	Épée	3/3	30 q	Cisneros (ESP); L 13-15	Did not advanced					
Inés García	Épée	3/2	28 q	Masalo (LTU); W 15-1O	Favre (SUI); L 9-15	Did not advanced				
María Mateos	Épée	1/4	60	Did not advanced						
Andrea Breteau	Foil	3/1	17 Q	Bye	Călugăreanu (ROM); L 7-15	Did not advanced				
Ariadna Castro	Foil	2/3	34 q	Kraenkl (AUT); W 15-6	Kreiss (HUN); L 11-15	Did not advanced				
María Mariño	Foil	5/0	3 Q	Bye	Chaldaiou (GRE); W 15-4	Pretova (UKR); L 14-15	Did not advanced			
Ariadna Tucker	Foil	3/2	20 Q	Bye	Druck (ISR); L 9-15	Did not advanced				
Elena Hernández	Sabre	3/3	28 q	Gette (GER); W 15-14	Georgiadou (GRE); L 5-15	Did not advanced				
Lucía Martín-Portugués	Sabre	4/2	16 Q	Bye	Matuszak (POL); W 15-13	Pantis (ROU); L 7-15	Did not advanced			
Araceli Navarro	Sabre	4/1	9 Q	Bye	Criscio (ITA); W 15-13	Mormile (ITA); W 15-10	Pantis (ROU); L 11-15	Did not advanced		
Celia Pérez	Sabre	3/3	30 q	Bakastova (UKR); L 8-15	Did not advanced					

Team Events

Athlete	Event	Round of 16	Quarterfinals	Semifinals	Final / BM	
Athlete	Event	Opposition Score	Opposition Score	Opposition Score	Opposition Score	Rank
Manuel Bargues; Álvaro Ibáñez; Yulen Pereira; Juan Pedro Romero	Men's team épée	Sweden (SWE); W 45-34	Hungary (HUN); L 32-37	Ukraine (UKR); L 42-45	Poland (POL); W 36-35	7th
Ignacio Breteau; Roger García-Alzórriz; Carlos Llavador; Esteban Peressini	Men's team foil	Belgium (BEL); L 41-45	Croatia (CRO); L 39-45	Georgia (GEO); W 45-35	Austria (AUT); W 45-35	13th
Iñaki Bravo; Óscar Fernández; Andrés Hernández; Santiago Madrigal	Men's team sabre	Ireland (IRL); W 45-32	Germany (GER); L 38-45	Romania (ROU); W 45-44	Ukraine (UKR); W 45-44	5th
Sofía Cisneros; Sara Fernández; Inés García; María Mateos	Women's team épée	Hungary (HUN); L 35-38	Finland (FIN); W 45-34	Georgia (GEO); L 30-45	Sweden (SWE); W 45-36	11th
Andrea Breteau; Ariadna Castro; María Mariño; Ariadna Tucker	Women's team foil	Greece (GRE); W 45-33	Hungary (HUN); L 28-45	Ukraine (UKR); L 33-45	Austria (AUT); W 45-33	7th
Elena Hernández; Lucía Martín-Portugués; Araceli Navarro; Celia Pérez	Women's team sabre	Bye	Bulgaria (BUL); L 44-45	Germany (GER); W 45-43	Azerbaijan (AZE); W 45-42	5th

== Judo ==
Athlete	Category	Round of 16	Quarterfinals	Semifinals	Final	
Athlete	Category	Opposition Result	Opposition Result	Opposition Result	Opposition Result	Rank
José Antonio Aranda; Cristina Cabaña; Irinel Chelaru; Jaione Equisoain; Eunate Etxebarría; Tristani Mosakhlishvili; Daniel Nieto; Adriana Rodríguez Salvador	Mixed team	Austria (AUT); L 3-4	Did not advanced			

== Karate ==
Athlete	Event	Group stage				Semifinal	Final	
Athlete	Event	Opposition Score	Opposition Score	Opposition Score	Rank	Opposition Score	Opposition Score	Rank
Damián Quintero	Men's kata	Ujihara (SUI); 42.70 - 40.70	Ngoan (FRA); 42.30 - 38.80	Mijač (MNE); 42.70 - 38.70	1 Q	Busato (ITA); 44.70 - 42.90	Sofuoğlu (TUR); 44.60 - 44.10	1st place, gold medalist(s)
Babacar Seck	Men's +84 kg	Arkania (GEO); L 9-6	Bostandžić (BIH); W 5-4	Gurbanli (AZE); L 4-6	3	Did not advanced		
Paola García	Women's kata	Xenou (GRE); 42.40 - 41.80	Bozan (TUR); 43.20 - 41.90	Bjerring (DEN); 42.50 - 39.00	1 Q	Cruz (POR); 43.40 - 42.00	Taily (FRA); 43.90 - 41.20	1st place, gold medalist(s)
María Isabel Nieto	Women's -68 kg	Zaretska (AZE); L 3-4	Makyan (ARM); L 4-4	Melnyk (UKR); W 4-4	3	Did not advanced		
María Torres	Women's +68 kg	Lesjak (CRO); W 2-0	Aliyeva (AZE); W 4-2	Ferracuti (ITA); L 2-5	2 Q	Kneer (GER); L 7-2	Did not advanced	3rd place, bronze medalist(s)

== Kickboxing ==
Spain is scheduled to compete in kickboxing with the following athletes:

- Mohamed Hamdi Hajji: Men's Full contact -86kg
- Cristina Morales: Women's Full contact -52kg
- Rubén Iglesias: Men's Light contact -63kg

Athlete	Event	Quarterfinals	Semifinals	Final	
Athlete	Event	Opposition Result	Opposition Result	Opposition Result	Rank
Rubén Iglesias	Men's -63 kg	Cipriano (SUI); W 2-1	Triqui (GER); L RSC	Did not advance	3rd place, bronze medalist(s)
Mohamed Hamdi Hajji	Men's -86 kg	Lulaj (ITA); W RSCH	Melnyk (UKR); W 2-1	Krason (POL); L 0-3	2nd place, silver medalist(s)
Cristina Morales	Women's -52 kg	Arslan (TUR); L 1-2	Did not advance		

== Muaythai ==
Athlete	Event	Quarterfinals	Semifinals	Final	
Athlete	Event	Opposition Result	Opposition Result	Opposition Result	Rank
Javier Segura	Men's -67 kg	Bylander (SWE); L 26-30	Did not advance		
Claudia Perona	Women's -51 kg	Djedidi (FRA); L 27-30	Did not advance		
Lara Fernández	Women's -54 kg	Depypere (BEL); L 27-30	Did not advance		
Rebeca Rodríguez	Women's -60 kg	Piccirillo (BEL); L 27-30	Did not advance		

== Padel ==
Athletes	Event	Round of 32	Round of 16	Quarterfinal	Semi-final	Final	
Athletes	Event	Opposition Result	Opposition Result	Opposition Result	Opposition Result	Opposition Result	Rank
Alonso Rodriguez; Pablo García	Men's Doubles	Dimitrov / Mladenov (BUL); W 6-1, 6-1	Stjern / Appelgren (SWE); W 7-6(4), 7-6(2)	Sinicropi / Grazzioti (ITA); W 6-4, 6-3	Oliveira / Fazendeiro (POR); W 7-5, 6-3	Gala / Santigosa (ESP); L 3-6, 3-6	2nd place, silver medalist(s)
David Gala; Daniel Santigosa	Men's Doubles	Macinskas / Poska (LTU); W 6-3, 7-5	Lindmeyer / Wunner (GER); W 6-2, 7-5	Deus / Deus (POR); W 6-2, 7-6	Cremona / Casetta (ITA); W 7-6, 6-3	Rodríguez / García (ESP); W 6-3, 6-3	1st place, gold medalist(s)
Noa Canovas; Araceli Maria Martínez	Women's Doubles	Soubrie / Touly (FRA); W 6-3, 6-4	Hechenberger / Meyer (SUI); W 6-2, 6-4	Weterings / Koek (NED); W 6-1, 6-4	Orsi / Marchetti (ITA); L 4-6, 6-4, 3-6	Pappacena / Sussarello (ITA); L 5-7, 6-3, 5-7	4
Marta Caparrós; Marta Barrera	Women's Doubles	Bye	Ceilutkaite / Maciulaityte (LTU); W 6-1, 6-0	Ginier Barbier / Pothier (FRA); W 6-3, 6-7, 6-3	Pappacena / Sussarello (ITA); W 6-3, 6-4	Orsi / Marchetti (ITA); L 4-6, 6-4, 5-7	2nd place, silver medalist(s)
Noa Canovas; Daniel Santiagosa	Mixed Doubles	Bye	Behram / Andersson (SWE); W 6-2, 6-2	Orsi / Graziotii (ITA); W 3-6, 7-5, 7-6	Pothier / Leygue (FRA); W 3-6, 7-5, 7-6	Sussarello / Cassetta (ITA); W 6-3, 7-5	1st place, gold medalist(s)
Araceli Maria Martinez; David Gala	Mixed Doubles	Bye	Soubrie / Touly (FRA); W 6-3, 6-4	Rosolska / Janowicz (POL); W 6-3, 7-5	Sussarello / Cassetta (ITA); L 2-6, 6-4, 5-7	Pothier / Leygue (FRA); W 7-6, 7-6	3rd place, bronze medalist(s)

== Rugby sevens ==
Team	Event	Group stage				Quarterfinals	Semifinals	Final / BM	
Team	Event	Opposition Score	Opposition Score	Opposition Score	Rank	Opposition Score	Opposition Score	Opposition Score	Rank
Spain	Men's tournament	Belgium; W 26-12	Czech Republic; W 40-14	Georgia; W 35-7	1 Q	Italy; W 36-7	Great Britain; L 7-19	Portugal; W 42-0	3rd place, bronze medalist(s)
Spain	Women's tournament	Romania; W 30-0	Sweden; W 36-0	Belgium; W 29-7	1 Q	Czech Republic; L 12-17	Did not advanced		

== Shooting ==
Men's

Athlete	Event	Qualification		Final	
Athlete	Event	Points	Rank	Points	Rank
Martín Freije	10 m air pistol	571	27	Did not advanced	
Jorge Llames	25 m rapid fire pistol	556	25	Did not advanced	
Jesús Oviedo	10 m air rifle	627.2	21	Did not advanced	
Alberto Fernández	Trap	119	19	Did not advanced	
Adriá Martínez	Trap	123+3	4 Q	9	8

Women's

Athlete	Event	Qualification		Final	
Athlete	Event	Points	Rank	Points	Rank
Sonia Franquet	10 m air pistol	556	36	Did not advanced	
Irlanda Mira	10 m air pistol	569	15	Did not advanced	
Sonia Franquet; Irlanda Mira; Mercedes Soto	Team 10 m air pistol	848	7 Q	560	8
Carmen Ceballos	25 m pistol	570	23	Did not advanced	
Mercedes Soto	25 m pistol	577	15	Did not advanced	
Paula Grande	10 m air rifle	624.1	30	Did not advanced	
Fátima Galvez	Trap	119+7	5 Q	18	5
Mar Molné	Trap	118	8 Q	11	7

Mixed

Athlete	Event	Qualification		Final	
Athlete	Event	Points	Rank	Points	Rank
Sonia Franquet; Martín Freije	Mixed 10 m air pistol team	573	14	Did not advanced	
Paula Grande; Jesús Oviedo	Mixed 10 m air rifle team	631.4	2 Q	Italy (ITA); L 17-7	2nd place, silver medalist(s)
Andrés García; Fátima Gálvez	Trap	140	9	Did not advanced	
Adrià Martínez; Mar Molné	Trap	138	16	Did not advanced	

== Table tennis ==
Athlete	Event	Round 1	Round 2	Round 3	Round of 16	Quarterfinals	Semifinals	Final / BM	
Athlete	Event	Opposition Score	Opposition Score	Opposition Score	Opposition Score	Opposition Score	Opposition Score	Opposition Score	Rank
Carlos Caballero	Men's singles	Bye	Oláh (FIN); L 1-4	Did not advanced					
Álvaro Robles	Men's singles	Bye		Ionescu (ROM); L 1-4	Did not advanced				
María Xiao	Women's singles	Bye	Shuohan (NED); W 4-1	Mittelham (GER); L 2-4	Did not advanced				
Sofía-Xuan Zhang	Women's singles	Bye	Węgrzyn (POL); W 4-3	Yu (POR); L 0-4	Did not advanced				
Álvaro Robles; María Xiao	Mixed doubles	—N/a			Brateyko / Limonov (UKR); W 3–1	Lupulesku / Levajac (SRB); W 3–2	Mittelham / Qiu (GER); L 1-3	Ionescu / Szocs (ROU); L1-3	4

== Taekwondo ==
Men's events

Athlete	Event	Round of 16	Quarterfinal	Semi-final	Repechage	Final	
Athlete	Event	Opposition Result	Opposition Result	Opposition Result	Opposition Result	Opposition Result	Rank
Hugo Arillo	-54 kg	Dimitropolous (GRE); W 1-2	Molle (NED); W 0-2	Conti (ITA); W 0-2	—N/a	Dadaşov (AZE); W 2-1	1st place, gold medalist(s)
Adrián Vicente	-58 kg	Nagaev (ISR); W 2-0	Magomedov (AZE); W 0-2	Ravet (FRA); W 1-2	—N/a	Woolley (IRL); W 2-1	1st place, gold medalist(s)
Joan Jorquera	-63 kg	Bye	Bystrov (UKR); W 2-0	Baretta (ITA); L 0-2	—N/a	Stanic (SRB); W 2-1	3rd place, bronze medalist(s)
Javier Pérez Polo	-68 kg	Galland (SUI); W 2-0	Chamalidis (GRE); W 0-2	Lucien (FRA); W 1-2	—N/a	Sinden (GBR); W WD	1st place, gold medalist(s)
Daniel Quesada	-74 kg	Sargsyan (ARM); W 1-1 WDR	Kintsurashvili (GEO); L 0-2	Bye	Nsilu Dilandu (IRL); W 2-0	Golubic (CRO); W 2-0	3rd place, bronze medalist(s)
Jon Andoni Cintado	-80 kg	Gerrone (ITA); W 2-1	Mehdipournejad (ROT); W 2-0	Hrnic (DEN); L 1-2	—N/a	Kartal (TUR); L 0-2	5
Raúl Martínez	-87 kg	Bye	Bachmann (GER); W 2-0	Divkovic (SLO); L 0-2	—N/a	Tholiotis (GRE); W 2-1	3rd place, bronze medalist(s)
Ivan García	+87 kg	Michopoulos (GRE); W 2-0	Zonderop (NED); W 2-1	Georgievski (MKD); L 0-2	—N/a	Atesli (TUR); L 0-2	5

Women's events

Athlete	Event	Round of 16	Quarterfinal	Semi-final	Repechage	Final	
Athlete	Event	Opposition Result	Opposition Result	Opposition Result	Opposition Result	Opposition Result	Rank
Ana Jiménez	-46 kg	Goodman (GBR); L 1-2	Did not advance				
Adriana Cerezo	-49 kg	Bye	Maestro (ITA); W 2-0	Semberg (ISR); W 2-0	—N/a	Dinçel (TUR); W 2-1	1st place, gold medalist(s)
Alma Pérez	-53 kg	Pilavaki (CYP); W 2-0	Hronova (CZE); W 2-0	Patakfalvy (HUN); W 2-0	—N/a	Duvančić (CRO); L 0-2	2nd place, silver medalist(s)
Arlet Ortiz	-57 kg	Al Halwani (ITA); W 2-1	Jones (GBR); L 0-2	Did not advanced	Grétarsdóttir (ISL); W 2-1	İlgün (TUR); L 0-2	5
Jone Magdaleno	-62 kg	Powell (GBR); L 0-2	Did not advance				
Cecilia Castro	-67 kg	Mink (NED); W 2-1	D'Angelo (ITA); W 2-1	Wiet Henin (FRA); W 2-0	—N/a	Perisic (SRB); L 0-2	2nd place, silver medalist(s)
Tania Castiñeira	+73 kg	Petanjek (CRO); W 2-0	Cook (GBR); L 0-2	Did not advance			

== Triathlon ==
Spain qualified for three quota places in both the men's and women's events. This also entitled them to enter a team in the mixed relay.

Athlete	Event	Swim (1.5 km)	Trans 1	Bike (40 km)	Trans 2	Run (10 km)	Total time	Rank
David Cantero	Men's triathlon	19:25	0:55	55:43	0:26	31:12	1:47:37	11
Alberto González	Men's triathlon	18:23	0:53	56:57	0:26	31:08	1:47:45	14
Mario Mola	Men's triathlon	19:35	0:52	1:00:22	0:29	32:04	1:53:21	46
Anna Godoy	Women's triathlon	19:42	0:54	1:05:40	0:32	35:25	2:02:11	22
Sara Guerrero	Women's triathlon	19:39	1:00	1:01:37	0:30	36:42	1:59:27	16
Cecilia Santamaría	Women's triathlon	19:40	0:58	1:01:26	0:31	38:01	2:00:33	19
David Cantero; Sara Guerrero; Alberto González; Cecilia Santamaría	Mixed relay	15:45	2:00	29:24	1:46	18:35	1:07:54	5
