= Sweden at the 2023 European Games =

- IOC code: SWE
- NOC: Swedish Olympic Committee
- Website: www.sok.se

in Kraków, Poland 21 June 2023 – 2 July 2023
- Competitors: 129 in 16 sports
- Medals: Gold 2 Silver 7 Bronze 5 Total 14

European Games appearances (overview)
- 2015; 2019; 2023; 2027

Sweden competed at the 2023 European Games, in Kraków, Poland from 21 June to 2 July 2023. This was Sweden's third appearance at the Games.

== Before the Games ==
The Swedish Olympic Committee announced the athletes selected to represent Sweden on 2 June 2023; the selection of track and field athletes followed on 13 June.

== Medalists ==
Medal	Name	Sport	Event	Date
Gold	Marcus Svensson	Shooting	Men's skeet	25 June
Gold	Patricia Axling	Muaythai	Women's 57 kg	27 June
Silver	Petter Menning	Canoe sprint	Men's K-1 200 metres	23 June
Silver	Emil Blomberg	Athletics	Men's 3000 metres steeplechase	23 June
Silver	Daniel Ståhl	Athletics	Men's discus throw	24 June
Silver	Emilia Nilsson Garip	Diving	Women's 3 metre springboard	25 June
Silver	Andreas Almgren	Athletics	Men's 5000 metres	25 June
Silver	Emilia Nilsson Garip	Diving	Women's 1 metre springboard	28 June
Silver	Simon Berglund; Kristian Karlsson; Anton Källberg; Truls Möregårdh	Table tennis	Men's team	1 July
Bronze	Axelina Johansson	Athletics	Women's shot put	23 June
Bronze	Elias Petersen; Emilia Nilsson Garip	Diving	Mixed 3 m springboard synchro	24 June
Bronze	Linus Bylander	Muaythai	Men's 67 kg	26 June
Bronze	Rickard Levin Andersson	Shooting	Men's trap	30 June
Bronze	Nebil Ibrahim	Boxing	Men's 57 kg	30 June

== Competitors ==
Sport	Men	Women	Total
Archery	2	1	3
Athletics	20	19	39
Badminton	3	3	6
Boxing	1	3	4
Canoe slalom	3	0	3
Canoe sprint	4	4	8
Diving	2	3	5
Fencing	6	6	12
Karate	0	1	1
Modern pentathlon	1	1	2
Muaythai	2	1	3
Padel	4	4	8
Rugby sevens	0	13	13
Shooting	5	4	9
Table tennis	4	4	8
Taekwondo	4	1	5
Total	61	68	129

== Archery ==
Athlete	Event	Ranking round		Round of 64	Round of 32	Round of 16	Quarterfinal	Semi-final	Final / BM	
Athlete	Event	Score	Seed	Opposition Score	Opposition Score	Opposition Score	Opposition Score	Opposition Score	Opposition Score	Rank
Kaj Sjöberg	Men's individual recurve	653	31	Rufer (SUI); L 3–7	Did not advance					=33
Jacob Benschöljd	Men's individual compound	691	16	—N/a		Schloesser (NED); L 144–149	Did not advance			=9
Christine Bjerendal	Women's individual recurve	653	15	BYE	Andersen (DEN); W 6–0	Healey (GBR); L 1–7	Did not advance			=9
Kaj Sjöberg; Christine Bjerendal	Mixed team recurve	1306	11	—N/a	Cyprus (CYP); W 5–3	France (FRA); L 0–6	Did not advance			=9

== Athletics ==
Sweden is set to compete in the first division of the 2023 European Athletics Team Championships which is going to be held in Chorzów during, and as part of, the Games. Sweden will compete in the team event, and each athlete will also be eligible for the individual event medals. The team was announced on 13 June 2023.

European Athletics Team Championships First Division

Team	Event		Event points																			Total	Rank
Team	Event		100m	200m	400m	800m	1500m	5000m	110m h*	400m h	3000m SC	4x100m	4x400m**	SP	JT	HT	DT	PV	HJ	TJ	LJ	Total	Rank
See below	Team Championships First Division	Men																					
See below	Team Championships First Division	Women																					

key: h: hurdles; SC; Steeplechase: SP; Shot put: JT: Javelin: HT: Hammer: DT: Discus: PV: Pole vault: HJ: High jump: TJ: Triple Jump: LJ: Long Jump

- Women compete at 100 metre hurdles, rather than 110 metre hurdles.
- 4 x 400 metres is held as a single mixed sex event

Individual events

As a participant in the Team event, each nation, including Sweden, automatically enters one athlete in each of the individual 'events'. Medals are awarded at the conclusion of the First Division program.

Event	Male Athlete	Score	Rank	Female athlete	Score	Rank
100 m	Desmond Rogo			Julia Henriksson		
200 m	Desmond Rogo			Elvira Tanderud		
400 m	Kasper Kadestål			Lisa Lilja		
800 m	Andreas Kramer			Wilma Nielsen		
1500 m	Emil Danielsson			Hanna Hermansson		
5000 m	Andreas Almgren			Vera Sjöberg		
110/100 m h	Max Hrelja			Maja Maunsbach		
400m h	Karl Wållgren			Moa Granat		
3000m SC	Emil Blomberg			Linn Söderholm		
4x100 m	Zion Eriksson; Linus Pihl; Desmon Rogo; Jean-Christian Zirignon			Julia Henriksson; Nora Lindahl; Filippa Sivnert; Elvira Tanderud		
4x400 m (mixed)	—N/a			Emil Johansson; Kasper Kadestål; Moa Granat; Lisa Lilja		
Shot put	Wiktor Petersson			Axelina Johansson		
Javelin	Jakob Samuelsson			Beatrice Lantz		
Hammer	Ragnar Carlsson			Grete Ahlberg		
Discus	Daniel Ståhl			Caisa-Marie Lindfors		
Pole vault	William Asker			Michaela Meijer		
High jump	Fabian Delryd			Bianca Salming		
Triple Jump	Jesper Hellström			Maja Åskag		
Long Jump	Thobias Montler			Tilde Johansson		

== Badminton ==
Athlete	Event	Group stage				Round of 16	Quarter-finals	Semi-finals	Final	
Athlete	Event	Opposition Score	Opposition Score	Opposition Score	Rank	Opposition Score	Opposition Score	Opposition Score	Opposition Score	Rank
Felix Burestedt	Men's singles	Koljonen (FIN); L (22–20, 21–23, 12–21)	Antonsen (DEN); W (21–19, 21–19)	Lale (TUR); W (21–18, 21–10)	1 Q	Toti (ITA); W (21–16, 21–14)	Zilberman (ISR); L (21–17, 14–21, 19–21)	Did not advance		
Joel Hansson; Melker Zickerman Bexell	Men's doubles	Lamsfuß / Seidel (GER); L (16–21, 18–21)	Beketov / Makhnovskiy (UKR); W (21–10, 21–11)	Rusev / Stoynov (BUL); W (21–12, 21–17)	2 Q	—N/a	Dunn / Hall (GBR); L (11–21, 12–21)	Did not advance		
~~Edith Urell~~	Women's singles	Popovska (BUL) w/d	Kjærsfeldt (DEN) w/d	Buhrova (UKR) w/d	–	—N/a				
Moa Sjöö; Tilda Sjöö	Women's doubles	Efler / Lohau (GER); L (12–21, 14–21)	Frost / Ryan (IRL); W (21–14, 21–11)	Lambert / Tran (FRA); L (7–21, 9–21)	3	—N/a	Did not advance			

== Boxing ==
Athlete	Event	Round of 32	Round of 16	Quarterfinal	Semi-final	Final	
Athlete	Event	Opposition Result	Opposition Result	Opposition Result	Opposition Result	Opposition Result	Rank
Nebil Ibrahim	Men's 57 kg	Rustemovski (MKD); W 4–1	Walizadeh (ERT); W 5–0	Veres (HUN); W RSC	Ibáñez (BUL); L 1–4	Did not advance	3rd place, bronze medalist(s)
Zehra Milli	Women's 54 kg	BYE	Lambot (BEL); W 5–0	Davison (GBR); L 0–5	Did not advance		=5
Agnes Alexiusson	Women's 60 kg	Bernardova (CZE); W 5–0	Kruk (POL); W 5–0	Harrington (IRL); L 1–4	Did not advance		=5
Love Holgersson	Women's 75 kg	BYE	Gajic (SRB); W 5–0	O'Rourke (IRL); L 0–5	Did not advance		=5

== Canoe slalom ==
Athlete	Event	Preliminary						Semi-final		Final	
Athlete	Event	Run 1	Rank	Run 2	Rank	Best	Rank	Time	Rank	Time	Rank
Erik Holmer	Men's K-1										
Fredrik Wahlén	Men's K-1										
Isak Öhrström	Men's K-1										

== Canoe sprint ==
Athlete	Event	Heats		Semi-final		Final	
Athlete	Event	Time	Rank	Time	Rank	Time	Rank
Petter Menning	Men's K-1 200 metres	34.763	2 F	Bye		37.179	2nd place, silver medalist(s)
Martin Nathell	Men's K-1 500 metres	1:42.408	2 SF	1:41.951	3 FA	1:41.239	9
Joakim Lindberg; Martin Nathell	Men's K-2 500 metres	1:31.802	4 SF	1:33.082	2 FA	1:32.171	9
Joakim Lindberg; Petter Menning; Martin Nathell; Theodor Orban	Men's K-4 500 metres	1:25.239	8 SF	1:26.125	9	Did not advance	
Julia Lagerstam	Women's K-1 200 metres	41.961	3 F	Bye		42.294	7
Melina Andersson	Women's K-1 500 metres	1:55.473	4 SF	1:53.520	1 FA	1:51.612	5
Linnea Stensils; Moa Wikberg	Women's K-2 500 metres	1:42.680	4 SF	1:44.322	1 F	1:43.328	5
Melina Andersson; Julia Lagerstam; Linnea Stensils; Moa Wikberg	Women's K-4 500 metres	1:37.888	6 SF	1:38.733	7	Did not advance	
Theodor Orban; Julia Lagerstam	Mixed K-2 200 metres	36.029	6 SF	34.804	5 FB	35.388	11

== Diving ==
Athlete	Events	Preliminary		Semi-final		Final	
Athlete	Events	Points	Rank	Points	Rank	Points	Rank
David Ekdahl	Men's 1 m springboard	306.65	19	Did not advance			
David Ekdahl	Men's 3 m springboard	357.45	19	Did not advance			
Elias Petersen	Men's 1 m springboard	272.20	24	Did not advance			
Elias Petersen	Men's 3 m springboard	345.30	22	Did not advance			
Emilia Nilsson Garip	Women's 1 m springboard	274.35	1 Q	—N/a		273.10	2nd place, silver medalist(s)
Emilia Nilsson Garip	Women's 3 m springboard	287.90	6 Q	—N/a		316.60	2nd place, silver medalist(s)
Elna Widerström	Women's 1 m springboard	204.30	17	Did not advance			
Elna Widerström	Women's 3 m springboard	256.80	11 Q	—N/a		174.55	12
Amanda Lundin	Women's 10 m platform	221.35	14	Did not advance			
Emilia Nilsson Garip; Elna Widerström	Women's 3 m synchro springboard	—N/a				260.19	5
Elias Petersen; Emilia Nilsson Garip	Mixed 3 m springboard synchro	—N/a				282.60	3rd place, bronze medalist(s)

== Fencing ==
Individual

Athlete	Event	Group stage						Rank	Knockout stage					Final rank
Athlete	Event	Match 1	Match 2	Match 3	Match 4	Match 5	Match 6	Rank	1/16 final	1/8 final	1/4 final	1/2 final	Medal final	Final rank
Hugo Brandberg	Men's épée													
Linus Islas Flygare	Men's épée													
Christopher Kelly	Men's épée													
Jonathan Svensson	Men's épée													
Sophie Engdahl	Women's épée													
Emma Fransson	Women's épée													
Emelie Mumm	Women's épée													
Elvira Mårtensson	Women's épée													
Ester Schreiber	Women's foil													
Miriam Schreiber	Women's foil													

Team

Athletes	Event	Round of 32	Round of 16	Placement round	Placement round	Placement round	Rank
Hugo Brandberg; Linus Islas Flygare; Christopher Kelly; Jonathan Svensson	Men's team épée	Latvia (LAT); W 45–18	Spain (ESP); L 34–45	Denmark (DEN); L 39–45	Belgium (BEL); W 45–38	Netherlands (NED); W 43–35	13
Sophie Engdahl; Emma Fransson; Emelie Mumm; Elvira Mårtensson	Women's team épée	BYE	Switzerland (SUI); L 28–45	Czech Republic (CZE); W 43–30	Romania (ROU); L 39–45	Spain (ESP); L 36–45	12

== Karate ==
Athlete	Event	Pool round				Semifinal	Final / RM	Rank
Athlete	Event	Opposition Result	Opposition Result	Opposition Result	Rank	Opposition Result	Opposition Result	Rank
Anna-Johanna Nilsson	Women's -61 kg	Serogina (UKR); L 1–4	Mangiacapra (ITA); L 1–2	Suchánková (SVK); L 0–4	4	Did not advance		=7

== Modern pentathlon ==
Athlete	Event	Fencing (épée one touch)				Swimming (200 m freestyle)			Riding (show jumping)			Combined: shooting/running (10 m air pistol)/(3200 m)			Total points	Final rank
Athlete	Event	RR	BR	Rank	MP points	Time	Rank	MP points	Penalties	Rank	MP points	Time	Rank	MP Points	Total points	Final rank
Daniel Steinbock	Men's															
Marlena Jawaid	Women's															
Daniel Steinbock; Marlena Jawaid	Mixed team															

== Muaythai ==
Athlete	Event	Quarterfinal	Semi-final	Final	
Athlete	Event	Opposition Result	Opposition Result	Opposition Result	Rank
Linus Bylander	Men's -67 kg	Segura Sáez (ESP); W 30–26	Liubchenko (UKR); L 27–30	Did not advance	3rd place, bronze medalist(s)
Rasmus Eriksson	Men's -71 kg	Noites (POR); L 27–30	Did not advance		=5
Patricia Axling	Women's -57 kg	Kuzawińska (POL); W 30–27	Devrishova (AZE); W CCL	Melo (POR); W 30–27	1st place, gold medalist(s)

== Padel ==
Athlete	Event	Round 1	Round of 16	Quarterfinal	Semi-final	Repechage	Final	
Athlete	Event	Opposition Result	Opposition Result	Opposition Result	Opposition Result	Opposition Result	Opposition Result	Rank
Daniel Appelgren; Viktor Stjern	Men's doubles							
Anton Andersson; Albin Olsson	Men's doubles							
Ajla Behram; Amanda Girdo	Women's doubles							
Linnea Björk; Baharak Soleymani	Women's doubles							
Anton Andersson; Ajla Behram	Mixed doubles	—N/a						

== Rugby sevens ==
Athletes	Event	Group stage				Placing 9–12	Placing 9–10	Rank
Athletes	Event	Opponent Score	Opponent Score	Opponent Score	Rank	Opponent Score	Opponent Score	Rank
Emma Gabinus; Sara Jacobsson; Frida Nilsson; Olivia Palmgren; Sonia Smolina; Amanda Swartz; Paulina Toresäter Isabell Wijkström; Linnéa Flyman; Matilda Mahlberg; Maja Meuller; Minonna Nunstedt; Yaiza Milletorp	Women's	Belgium; L 0–40	Spain; L 0–36	Romania; L 12–19	4	Turkey; W 10–7	Romania; W 25–5	9

== Shooting ==
Athlete	Event	Qualification		Ranking Match		Final	
Athlete	Event	Points	Rank	Points	Rank	Opponent	Rank
Henrik Jansson	Men's skeet	123	5 Q	27	3	Did not advance	
Marcus Svensson	Men's skeet	123	4 Q	30	1 Q	38	1st place, gold medalist(s)
Rickard Levin Andersson	Men's trap	121	8 Q	21	1 Q	22	3rd place, bronze medalist(s)
Marcus Madsen	Men's 10 m air rifle	628.5	9	Did not advance			
Marcus Madsen	Men's 50 m rifle three positions	592	4 Q	351.4	6	Did not advance	
Morgan Johansson Cropper	Men's 10 m air pistol	579	7 Q	146.0	8	Did not advance	
Victoria Larsson	Women's skeet	121	3 Q	27	3	Did not advance	
Isabelle Johansson	Women's 10 m air rifle	623.0	32	Did not advance			
Vendela Sörensson	Women's 10 m air pistol	559	32	Did not advance			
Stina Lawner	Women's 10 m air pistol	563	28	Did not advance			
Stina Lawner	Women's 25 m pistol	577	16	Did not advance			

== Table Tennis ==
Athlete	Event	Round 1	Round 2	Round of 32	Round of 16	Quarterfinal	Semi-final	Final / BM	
Athlete	Event	Opposition Result	Opposition Result	Opposition Result	Opposition Result	Opposition Result	Opposition Result	Opposition Result	Rank
Kristian Karlsson	Men's singles	BYE		Rassenfosse (BEL); W 4–0	Freitas (POR); L 3–4	Did not advance			=9
Truls Möregårdh	Men's singles	BYE		Pištej (SVK); W 4–0	Habesohn (AUT); L 3–4	Did not advance			=9
Simon Berglund; Kristian Karlsson; Anton Källberg; Truls Möregårdh	Men's team	—N/a			BYE	Slovakia (SVK); W 3–0	France (FRA); W 3–2	Germany (GER); L 1–3	2nd place, silver medalist(s)
Linda Bergström	Women's singles	BYE		Surjan (SRB); W 4–1	Han (GER); L 2–4	Did not advance			=9
Stina Källberg	Women's singles	BYE	Nagyvarady (HUN); L 3–4	Did not advance					=33
Filippa Bergand; Linda Bergström; Matilda Hansson; Stina Källberg	Women's team	—N/a			Slovakia (SVK); W 3–2	Germany (GER); L 1–3	Did not advance		=5
Truls Möregårdh; Stina Källberg	Mixed doubles	—N/a			Gündüz/Altınkaya (TUR); L 2–3	Did not advance			=9

== Taekwondo ==
Athlete	Event	Round of 16	Quarterfinal	Semi-final	Repechage	Final	
Athlete	Event	Opposition Result	Opposition Result	Opposition Result	Opposition Result	Opposition Result	Rank
Ebrahim Marwan	Men's -54 kg	Polat (TUR); W 2–0	Teskera (CRO); W 2–0	Dadashov (AZE); L 0–2	BYE	Dimitropolous (GRE); L 1–2	=5
Josef Alami	Men's -58 kg	Woolley (IRL); L 0–2	Did not advance		Nour (GBR); L 0–3	Did not advance	=7
Ali Alian	Men's -68 kg	Bećović (MNE); L 1–2	Did not advance				=11
Mohammed Chehade	Men's -74 kg	Golubić (CRO); L 0–2	Did not advance				=11
Tindra Andersson	Women's -62 kg	Chaari (BEL); L 0–2	Did not advance		Tarvida (LAT); L 0–2	Did not advance	=7
