= Archery at the 2023 European Games =

- Venue: Plaszowianka Archery Park
- Dates: 23–29 June
- Competitors: 124 from 36 nations

At the 2023 European Games in Kraków, eight events of archery were contested, all in a target archery format. Five events were held with recurve bows, mirroring the five 2024 Olympic events, and three events with compound bows, which are no longer used in Olympic competition, but are used in Paralympic competition.

Three of the events in recurve are also used as a Continental Qualification Tournament for the 2024 Summer Olympics.

== Qualification ==
=== Summary ===
World Archery Europe announced 118 of the 128 archers to be invited on 10 May 2023, following the conclusion of the final qualification events at Lilleshall in England. Ten universality places, 5 each in the men's and women's individual recurve remain to be allocated. The mixed team events, unlike the men and women's team recurve, did not receive quotas of their own; in the event, 24 nations qualified at least one man and one woman in recurve to qualify for the mixed team recurve events, with the possibility of further teams after universality places are confirmed. In addition, nine nations have qualified at least one man and one woman in the compound category, and are thus qualified for the compound mixed team event.

Nation	Recurve					Compound			Total
Nation	Men's individual	Men's team	Women's individual	Women's team	Mixed team	Men's individual	Women's individual	Mixed team	Total
Austria	1		1		X				2
Azerbaijan			1						1
Belgium	1		1		X		1		3
Bulgaria	1		1		X				2
Croatia	1								1
Cyprus	1		1		X				2
Czech Republic	1		1		X				2
Denmark	1		3	X	X	1	1	X	6
Estonia			1			1	1	X	3
Finland	1		1		X		1		3
France	3	X	3	X	X	1	1	X	8
Georgia			1						1
Germany	1		3		X	1	1	X	6
Great Britain	3	X	3	X	X		1		7
Greece	1		1		X	1			3
Hungary	1					1			2
Iceland			1						1
Ireland	1		1		X				2
Israel	1		1		X	1			3
Italy	3	X	3	X	X	1	1	X	8
Kosovo	1								1
Latvia	1						1		2
Lithuania			1			1			2
Luxembourg	1						1		2
Moldova	1		1		X				2
Netherlands	3	X	1		X	1	1	X	6
Poland	3	X	3	X	X	1	1	X	8
Portugal	1								1
Romania	1		1		X				2
Slovakia	1		1		X	1			3
Slovenia	1		3	X	X	1			5
Spain	3	X	1		X	1	1	X	6
Sweden	1		1		X	1			3
Switzerland	3	X	1		X				4
Turkey	1		3	X	X	1	1	X	6
Ukraine	3	X	1		X		1		5
36 NOCs	47	8	46	8	25	16	15	9	124

== Medal table ==
Rank	NOC	Gold	Silver	Bronze	Total
1	Italy	2	1	3	6
2	Great Britain	2	1	0	3
3	Spain	1	3	1	5
4	Germany	1	0	1	2
5	Estonia	1	0	0	1
5	Slovakia	1	0	0	1
7	Denmark	0	1	0	1
7	France	0	1	0	1
7	Ukraine	0	1	0	1
10	Turkey	0	0	2	2
11	Switzerland	0	0	1	1
Totals (11 entries)		8	8	8	24

== Medal summary ==
=== Recurve ===
Event	Gold	Silver	Bronze
Men's individual	Florian Unruh; Germany	Miguel Alvariño; Spain	Pablo Acha; Spain
Men's team	Italy; Federico Musolesi; Mauro Nespoli; Alessandro Paoli	Spain; Pablo Acha; Miguel Alvariño; Andrés Temiño	Switzerland; Keziah Chabin; Florian Faber; Thomas Rufer
Women's individual	Penny Healey; Great Britain	Elia Canales; Spain	Chiara Rebagliati; Italy
Women's team	Great Britain; Penny Healey; Bryony Pitman; Jaspreet Sagoo	France; Audrey Adiceom; Lisa Barbelin; Caroline Lopez	Italy; Tatiana Andreoli; Lucilla Boari; Chiara Rebagliati
Mixed team	Spain; Miguel Alvariño; Elia Canales	Ukraine; Ivan Kozhokar; Anastasiia Pavlova	Germany; Florian Unruh; Michelle Kroppen

=== Compound ===
Event	Gold	Silver	Bronze
Men's individual	Jozef Bošanský; Slovakia	Marco Bruno; Italy	Emircan Haney; Turkey
Women's individual	Elisa Roner; Italy	Ella Gibson; Great Britain	Hazal Burun; Turkey
Mixed team	Estonia; Robin Jäätma; Lisell Jäätma	Denmark; Mathias Fullerton; Tanja Gellenthien	Italy; Marco Bruno; Elisa Roner

== Paris 2024 qualification ==
The Archery tournament at the 2023 European Games is a direct qualification event for the archery program in Paris 2024. A total of 6 quota places will be awarded in three events:

Event	Qualification path	Quotas	NOCS
Recurve Mixed Team:	One NOC of the highest placed mixed team will earn one (1) women’s and one (1) men’s quota place for a total of two (2) quota places.	2	Spain (2)
Recurve Individual Men	NOCs of the two (2) highest placed athletes from different NOCs will each earn one (1) quota place in the relevant gender.	2	Germany; Moldova
Recurve Individual Women	NOCs of the two (2) highest placed athletes from different NOCs will each earn one (1) quota place in the relevant gender.	2	Great Britain; Italy
Total quota places		6	
