= Archery at the 2023 European Games – Mixed team recurve =

Mixed team recurve at the 2023 European Games
- Venue: Plaszowianka Archery Park
- Date: 23, 25 June
- Competitors: 50 from 25 nations
- Teams: 25

Medalists
gold medal	Elia Canales; Miguel Alvariño	Spain
silver medal	Anastasia Pavlova; Ivan Kozhokar	Ukraine
bronze medal	Michelle Kroppen; Florian Unruh	Germany

The mixed team recurve competition at the 2023 European Games was held on 23 and 25 June at the Plaszowianka Archery Park in Kraków.

== Records ==
Prior to the competition, the existing world, European and Games records were as follows:

- 144 arrow ranking round

World record	South Korea; Kang Chae-young; Lee Woo-seok	1388	's-Hertogenbosch, Netherlands	10 June 2019
European record	Germany; Michelle Kroppen; Florian Unruh	1362	Munich, Germany	7 June 2022
Games record	Netherlands; Gaby Schloesser; Sjef van den Berg	1345	Minsk, Belarus	21 June 2019

== Results ==
=== Qualification round ===
Rank	Nation	Archer	Individual total	Team total	Notes
1	Germany	Michelle Kroppen	680	1366; ER, GR	
1	Germany	Florian Unruh	686	1366; ER, GR	
2	Great Britain	Penny Healey	681	1364	
2	Great Britain	Monty Orton	683	1364	
3	Ukraine	Anastasia Pavlova	681	1357	
3	Ukraine	Ivan Kozhokar	676	1357	
4	Spain	Elia Canales	670	1346	
4	Spain	Miguel Alvariño	676	1346	
5	Turkey	Ezgi Başaran	650	1342	T. 76;29
5	Turkey	Mete Gazoz	692	1342	T. 76;29
6	France	Lisa Barbelin	659	1342	T. 64;20
6	France	Baptiste Addis	683	1342	T. 64;20
7	Italy	Tatiana Andreoli	663	1339	
7	Italy	Alessandro Paoli	676	1339	
8	Netherlands	Gaby Schloesser	647	1327	
8	Netherlands	Senna Roos	680	1327	
9	Czech Republic	Marie Horáčková	666	1321	
9	Czech Republic	Adam Li	655	1321	
10	Moldova	Alexandra Mîrca	656	1315	
10	Moldova	Dan Olaru	659	1315	
11	Sweden	Christine Bjerendal	653	1306	
11	Sweden	Kaj Sjöberg	653	1306	
12	Poland	Magdalena Śmiałkowska	647	1304	
12	Poland	Kacper Sierakowski	657	1304	
13	Denmark	Kirstine Danstrup Andersen	651	1298	
13	Denmark	Oliver Staudt	647	1298	
14	Slovenia	Žana Pintarič	636	1294	
14	Slovenia	Den Habjan Malavašič	658	1294	
15	Slovakia	Denisa Baránková	652	1286	
15	Slovakia	Miroslav Duchoň	634	1286	
16	Switzerland	Laura Amato	611	1276	T. 38;15
16	Switzerland	Keziah Chabin	665	1276	T. 38;15
17	Israel	Mikaella Moshe	628	1276	T. 38;8
17	Israel	Roy Dror	648	1276	T. 38;8
18	Belgium	Charlotte Destrooper	602	1275	
18	Belgium	Jarno De Smedt	673	1275	
19	Romania	Mădălina Amăistroaie	627	1273	
19	Romania	Mario Timpu	646	1273	
20	Austria	Elisabeth Straka	647	1272	
20	Austria	Andreas Gstöttner	625	1272	
21	Greece	Dimitra Papadopoulou	641	1263	
21	Greece	Panagiotis Katsaitis	622	1263	
22	Cyprus	Elena Petrou	616	1254	
22	Cyprus	Charalampos Charalampous	638	1254	
23	Bulgaria	Dobromira Danailova	606	1246	
23	Bulgaria	Ivan Banchev	640	1246	
24	Finland	Ida-Lotta Lassila	557	1214	
24	Finland	Antti Tekoniemi	657	1214	
25	Ireland	Emma Louise Davis	587	1188	
25	Ireland	Oskar Ronan	601	1188	

=== Elimination round ===
==== Section 1 ====
1/12 finals
17	Moshe (ISR); Dror (ISR)	3	38	32	38	35
16	Amato (SUI); Chabin (SUI)	5	38	37	36	37
9	Horáčková (CZE); Li (CZE)	6	36	39	37
24	Lassila (FIN); Tekoniemi (FIN)	0	34	25	34

1/8 finals
1	Kroppen (GER); Unruh (GER)	6	40	39	37
16	Amato (SUI); Chabin (SUI)	0	35	30	35
9	Horáčková (CZE); Li (CZE)	2	39	36	36	36
8	Schloesser (NED); Wijler (NED)	6	37	37	37	37

Quarterfinals
1	Kroppen (GER); Unruh (GER)	6	36	40	38
8	Schloesser (NED); Wijler (NED)	0	35	39	30

==== Section 2 ====
1/12 finals
21	Papadopoulou (GRE); Katsaitis (GRE)	2	37	35	34	32
12	Śmiałkowska (POL); Sierakowski (POL)	6	37	35	37	38
13	Danstrup Andersen (DEN); Staudt (DEN)	4	36	37	36	39	18
20	Straka (AUT); Gstöttner (AUT)	5	38	32	39	32	18+

1/8 finals
5	Başaran (TUR); Gazoz (TUR)	6	39	33	40
12	Śmiałkowska (POL); Sierakowski (POL)	0	36	31	32
20	Straka (AUT); Gstöttner (AUT)	2	38	36	35	36
4	Canales (ESP); Alvariño (ESP)	6	37	37	38	37

Quarterfinals
5	Başaran (TUR); Gazoz (TUR)	2	36	40	35	34
4	Canales (ESP); Alvariño (ESP)	6	38	37	36	38

==== Section 3 ====
1/12 finals
19	Amăistroaie (ROU); Timpu (ROU)	6	36	38	38
14	Pintarič (SLO); Habjan Malavašič (SLO)	0	35	36	37
11	Bjerendal (SWE); Sjöberg (SWE)	5	31	36	36	39
22	Petrou (CYP); Charalampous (CYP)	3	37	35	36	34

1/8 finals
3	Pavlova (UKR); Kozhokar (UKR)	5	37	38	38	37	19
19	Amăistroaie (ROU); Timpu (ROU)	4	37	32	38	38	17
11	Bjerendal (SWE); Sjöberg (SWE)	0	35	33	33
6	Lopez (FRA); Addis (FRA)	6	38	37	40

Quarterfinals
3	Pavlova (UKR); Kozhokar (UKR)	5	36	34	36	37
6	Lopez (FRA); Addis (FRA)	3	34	34	36	37

==== Section 4 ====
1/12 finals
23	Danailova (BUL); Banchev (BUL)	0	35	31	35
10	Mîrca (MDA); Olaru (MDA)	6	40	39	39
15	Baránková (SVK); Duchoň (SVK)	4	35	38	37	37	18
18	Destrooper (BEL); De Smedt (BEL)	5	37	39	35	33	19

1/8 finals
7	Andreoli (ITA); Nespoli (ITA)	1	35	35	37
10	Mîrca (MDA); Olaru (MDA)	5	36	36	37
18	Destrooper (BEL); De Smedt (BEL)	1	34	32	38
2	Healey (GBR); Orton (GBR)	5	39	36	38

Quarterfinals
10	Mîrca (MDA); Olaru (MDA)	5	35	36	37	38	20
2	Healey (GBR); Orton (GBR)	3	36	37	32	37	19

==== Finals ====
Semifinals
1	Kroppen (GER); Unruh (GER)	2	39	37	37	37
4	Canales (ESP); Alvariño (ESP)	6	38	38	38	38
3	Pavlova (UKR); Kozhokar (UKR)	5	37	39	38	36	19
10	Mîrca (MDA); Olaru (MDA)	4	36	36	39	38	17

Gold medal match
4	Canales (ESP); Alvariño (ESP)	5	37	38	38
3	Pavlova (UKR); Kozhokar (UKR)	1	37	35	37
Bronze medal match
1	Kroppen (GER); Unruh (GER)	5	37	37	37	36	19+
10	Mîrca (MDA); Olaru (MDA)	4	37	36	38	36	19
