= Great Britain at the 2023 European Games =

- IOC code: GBR
- NOC: British Olympic Association
- Website: www.teamgb.com

in Kraków, Poland 21 June 2023 – 2 July 2023
- Competitors: 223 in 19 sports
- Flag bearers: Abbie Brown and Joe Clarke (Opening) (Closing)
- Medals: Gold 12 Silver 10 Bronze 27 Total 49

European Games appearances (overview)
- 2015; 2019; 2023; 2027

Great Britain competed at the 2023 European Games, in Kraków, Poland from 21 June to 2 July 2023. This was Great Britain's third appearance at the Games.

== Before the Games ==
Team GB announced the athletes selected to represent Great Britain on 1 Jun 2023. The team chosen is significantly larger than the one that took part in the 2019 in Minsk. No athletes were selected in non-Olympic sports, but some were selected for non-Olympic events within Olympic sports.

== Archery ==
Great Britain announced a team of seven archers on 1 June 2023.

Men

Athlete	Event	Ranking round		Round of 64	Round of 32	Round of 16	Quarterfinal	Semi-final	Final / BM	
Athlete	Event	Score	Seed	Opposition Score	Opposition Score	Opposition Score	Opposition Score	Opposition Score	Opposition Score	Rank
Monty Orton	Individual recurve	683	3	Bye	Staudt (AUT); W 6–2	Acha (ESP); L 2–6	Did not advance			=9
Alex Wise	Individual recurve	663	19	Katsaidis (GRE); W 7–3	Acha (ESP); L 2–6	Did not advance				=17
James Woodgate	Individual recurve	654	30	Staudt (DEN); L 2–6	Did not advance					=33
Monty Orton; Alex Wise; James Woodgate	Team recurve	2000	5	—N/a			Italy (ITA); L 1-5	Did not advance		7

Women

Athlete	Event	Ranking round		Round of 64	Round of 32	Round of 16	Quarterfinal	Semi-final	Final / BM	
Athlete	Event	Score	Seed	Opposition Result	Opposition Result	Opposition Result	Opposition Result	Opposition Result	Opposition Result	Rank
Penny Healey	Individual recurve	681 GR	2	Bye	Cavic (SLO); W 6–0	Bjerendal (SWE); W 7–1	Lopez (FRA); W 7–3	Rebagliati (ITA); W 6–0	Canales (ESP); W 6–2	1st place, gold medalist(s)
Bryony Pitman	Individual recurve	652	16	Bye	Barankova (SVK); W 6–4	Pavlova (UKR); L 5–6	Did not advance			=9
Jaspreet Sagoo	Individual recurve	637	28	Petrou (CYP); L DNS	Did not advance					
Ella Gibson	Individual compound	715 WR	1	—N/a		Bye	De Laat (NED); W 143–142	Burun (TUR); W 148–144	Elisa Roner (ITA); L 139–145	2nd place, silver medalist(s)
Penny Healey; Bryony Pitman; Jaspreet Sagoo	Team recurve	1970	3	—N/a			Denmark (DEN); W 5–3	Italy (ITA); W 5-4 SO	France (FRA); W 5–1	1st place, gold medalist(s)

Mixed

Athlete	Event	Ranking round		Round of 32	Round of 16	Quarterfinal	Semi-final	Final / BM	
Athlete	Event	Score	Seed	Opposition Result	Opposition Result	Opposition Result	Opposition Result	Opposition Result	Rank
Penny Healey; Monty Orton	Team recurve	1364	2	Bye	Belgium (BEL); W 5–1	Moldova (MDA); L 4–5	Did not advance		5

== Artistic swimming ==
Great Britain selected a team of twelve artistic swimmers on 1 June 2023.

Athlete	Event	Preliminary		Final	
Athlete	Event	Points	Rank	Points	Rank
Kate Shortman; Isabelle Thorpe	Duet technical	—N/a		242.9967	5
Kate Shortman; Isabelle Thorpe	Duet free	207.0023	5 Q	223.5084	3rd place, bronze medalist(s)
Ranjuo Tomblin; Beatrice Crass	Mixed duet technical	—N/a		203.4916	3rd place, bronze medalist(s)
Ranjuo Tomblin; Beatrice Crass	Mixed duet free	—N/a		163.9688	3rd place, bronze medalist(s)
Eleanor Blinkhorn; Isobel Blinkhorn; Millie Costello; Isobel Davies; Cerys Hughes; Aimee Lawrence; Daniella Lloyd; Robyn Swatman	Team technical	—N/a		177.6914	8
Eleanor Blinkhorn; Isobel Blinkhorn; Millie Costello; Isobel Davies; Cerys Hughes; Aimee Lawrence; Daniella Lloyd; Robyn Swatman	Team free	200.0418	7 Q	212.3856	5
Eleanor Blinkhorn; Isobel Blinkhorn; Millie Costello; Isobel Davies; Cerys Hughes; Aimee Lawrence; Daniella Lloyd; Robyn Swatman	Acrobatic routine	—N/a		168.6533	5
Eleanor Blinkhorn; Isobel Blinkhorn; Millie Costello; Isobel Davies; Cerys Hughes; Aimee Lawrence; Daniella Lloyd; Robyn Swatman	Free combination routine	did not start			

== Athletics ==
Great Britain is set to compete in the first division of the 2023 European Athletics Team Championships which is going to be held in Chorzów during, and as part of, the Games. Great Britain will compete in the team event, and each athlete will also be eligible for the individual event medals. The team was announced on 7 June 2023.

=== European Athletics Team Championships First Division ===
Team	Event		Event points ***																			Total points	Rank
Team	Event		100m	200m	400m	800m	1500m	5000m	110m h*	400m h	3000m SC	4 × 100 m	4 × 400 m**	SP	JT	HT	DT	PV	HJ	TJ	LJ	Total points	Rank
Great Britain (see below)	Team Championships First Division	Men	14	5.5	12	11	12	12	12	13	14	0	8	15	5	10	12	3.5	3	12	8	341	5
Great Britain (see below)	Team Championships First Division	Women	11	15	13	15	4	15	4	12	3	0	8	2	14	13	11	12	2	2	11	341	5

key: h: hurdles; SC; Steeplechase: SP; Shot put: JT: Javelin: HT: Hammer: DT: Discus: PV: Pole vault: HJ: High jump: TJ: Triple Jump: LJ: Long Jump

- Women compete at 100 metre hurdles, rather than 110 metre hurdles.
- 4 x 400 metres is held as a single mixed sex event
- Event points indicate placings in the First Division match. Individual medals are across all three divisions.

=== Individual events at the 2023 European Games ===
As a participant in the Team event, each nation, including Great Britain, automatically enters one athlete in each of the individual 'events'. Medals are awarded at the conclusion of the First Division program. On 17 June a small number of amendments were made to the team due to withdrawals (marked with *)

Event	Male Athlete	Score	Rank	Female athlete	Score	Rank
100 m	Jeremiah Azu	10.16	3rd place, bronze medalist(s)	Bianca Williams *	11.29	6
200 m	Adam Clayton	21.18	=11	Bianca Williams	22.75	3rd place, bronze medalist(s)
400 m	Alex Haydock-Wilson	45.25	5	Ama Pipi	51.10	4
800 m	Ben Pattison	1:46.94	6	Issy Boffey	2:00.39	4
1500 m	George Mills	3:38.17	5	Ellie Baker	4:16.81	13
5000 m	Jonathan Davies	13:56.11	5	Hannah Nuttall	15:29.49	3rd place, bronze medalist(s)
110/100 m h	Josh Zeller	13.59	5	Abigail Pawlett	13.63	13
400m h	Seamus Derbyshire	49.51	4	Lina Neilsen	55.36	5
3000m SC	Zak Seddon	8:27.42	3rd place, bronze medalist(s)	Maisie Grice	10:09.99	14
4 × 100 m	Jeremiah Azu; Oliver Bromby; Richard Kilty; Tommy Ramdhan; Reserves; Adam Clayton; Andrew Morgan-Harrison *	DSQ	–	Alyson Bell; Amy Hunt; Cassie-Ann Pemberton; Aleeya Sibbon; Reserves; Bianca Williams; Leonie Ashmeade *	DSQ	–
4 × 400 m (mixed)	—N/a			Alex Haydock-Wilson; Ama Pipi; Brodie Young; Carys McAulay; Reserves; Charlie Dobson; Laviai Nielsen; Lina Nielsen	3:14.27	9
Shot put	Scott Lincoln	21.10	3rd place, bronze medalist(s)	Sarah Omoregie	14.43	15
Javelin	Joe Dunderdale	69.85	12	Bekah Walton	59.76	3
Hammer	Jake Norris	71.98	7	Charlotte Payne	71.15	4
Discus	Lawrence Okoye	60.93	5	Jade Lally	58.08	6
Pole vault	Adam Hague	5.30	=13	Jade Ives *	4.50	5
High jump	William Grimsey	2.09	14	Laura Zialor	1.76	15
Triple Jump	Jude Bright-Davies	16.24	5	Georgina Forde-Wells	12.57	15
Long Jump	Jack Roach	7.60	9	Lucy Hadaway	6.41	6

== Badminton ==
Great Britain selected a team of ten badminton players across five events on 1 June 2023. The draw was made on 6 June by Badminton Europe and Broadcast on Facebook.

Athlete	Event	Group stage				Round of 16	Quarterfinal	Semi-final	Final	
Athlete	Event	Opposition Score	Opposition Score	Opposition Score	Rank	Opposition Score	Opposition Score	Opposition Score	Opposition Score	Rank
Johnnie Torjussen	Men's singles	Nguyen (IRL); L (8–21, 16–21)	Caljouw (NED); L (24–22, 20–22, 16–21)	Dratva (SVK); W (22–20, 21–17)	3	Did not advance				
Ben Lane; Sean Vendy	Men's doubles	Magee / Reynolds (IRL); W(21–15, 21–15)	Greco / Salutt (ITA); W (21–10, 21–16)	Dwicahyo / Qowimuramadhoni (AZE); W (21–8, 21–10)	1 Q	—N/a	Jille / van der Lecq (NED); W (21–15, 21–15)	C Popov / T Popov (FRA); W (21–15, 21–14)	Astrup/ Rasmussen (DEN); L (15–21, 21–19, 19–21)	2nd place, silver medalist(s)
Alexander Dunn; Adam Hall	Men's doubles	C Popov / T Popov (FRA); W (21–13, 21–16)	Král / Mendrek (CZE); W (21–7, 21–14)	Bochat / Cybulski (POL); L (21–11, 22–24, 19–21)	1 Q	—N/a	Hansson / Z-Bexell (SWE); W (21–11, 21–12)	Astrup/ Rasmussen (DEN); L (13–21, 21–16, 10–21)	Did not advance	3rd place, bronze medalist(s)
Kirsty Gilmour	Women's singles	Dąbczyńska (POL); W (21–9, 21–12)	Laurens (NED); W (21–13, 21–9)	Christodoulou (CYP); W (21–11, 21–9)	1 Q	Sándorházi (HUN); W (17–21, 21–17, 21–17)	Kjærsfeldt (DEN); W (16–21, 21–11, 21–19 )	Marin (ESP); L (13–21, 11–21)	Did not advance	3rd place, bronze medalist(s)
Julie MacPherson; Ciara Torrance	Women's doubles	Fruergaard / Thygesen (DEN); L (10–21, 6–21)	Stoliarenko / Zharka (UKR); W (21–17, 21–17)	Corsini / Mair (ITA); W (21–11, 21–14)	2 Q	—N/a	Lambert / Tran (FRA); L (13–21, 21–16, 13–21)	Did not advance		
Marcus Ellis; Lauren Smith	Mixed doubles	Lamsfuß / Lohau (GER); W (16–21, 21–17, 21–10)	Ivančič / Polanc (SLO); W (21–8, 21–13)	Birker / Hochmeir (AUT); W (21–10, 21–9)	1 Q	—N/a	Śmiłowski / Świerczyńska (POL); W (21–8, 21–16)	Gicquel / Delrue (FRA); L (18–21, 21–14, 18–21)	Did not advance	3rd place, bronze medalist(s)

== Boxing ==
Great Britain announced a team of thirteen boxers for the European Games.

Men

Athlete	Event	Round of 32	Round of 16	Quarterfinal	Semi-final	Final	
Athlete	Event	Opposition Result	Opposition Result	Opposition Result	Opposition Result	Opposition Result	Rank
Kiaran MacDonald	Flyweight (51 kg)	Bye	Omar (GER); W 5–0	Ametovic (SRB); W 5–0	Bennama (FRA); L 0—5	Did not advance	3rd place, bronze medalist(s)
Jack Dryden	Featherweight (57 kg)	Labidi (FRA); W 5-0	Jensen (DEN); L 0–5	Did not advance			
Reese Lynch	Light welterweight (63 kg)	Grandulis (LAT); W 5-0	Rosenov (BUL); L 0–5	Did not advance			
Harris Akbar	Light middleweight (71 kg)	Schachidov (GER); L 1–4	Did not advance				
Taylor Bevan	Light heavyweight (80 kg)	Bauderlique (FRA); W 5–0	Cassidy (IRL); L 0–5	Did not advance			
Lewis Williams	Heavyweight (92 kg)	Jakupi (KOS); W ABD R2	Acar (TUR); L 2–3	Did not advance			
Delicious Orie	Super heavyweight (92+ kg)	Milun (CRO); W 2–0 R2	Shiha (NOR); W 5–0	Chaloyan (ARM); W 5–0	Hernández (BUL); W 5–0	Abdullayev (AZE); W 5–0	1st place, gold medalist(s)

Women

Athlete	Event	Round of 32	Round of 16	Quarterfinal	Semi-final	Final	
Athlete	Event	Opposition Result	Opposition Result	Opposition Result	Opposition Result	Opposition Result	Rank
Demie-Jade Resztan	Light flyweight (50kg)	Bye	Sorrentino (ITA); L 0–5	Did not advance			
Charley Davison	Bantamweight (54 kg)	Bye	Romero (ESP); W 5–0	Milli (SWE); W 5–0	Petrova (BUL); L 0–5	Did not advance	3rd place, bronze medalist(s)
Elise Glynn	Featherweight (57kg)	Brankovic (SRB); W 5–0	Testa (ITA); L 2–3	Did not advance			
Shona Whitwell	Lightweight (60 kg)	Sadiku (KOS); L 0-4	Did not advance				
Rosie Eccles	Welterweight (66 kg)	Bye	Canfora (ITA); W 4–1	Broadhurst (IRL); W 3–2	Sürmeneli (TUR); L 1–4	Did not advance	3rd place, bronze medalist(s)
Kerry Davis	Middleweight (66+ kg)	Michel (FRA); L 2–3	Did not advance				

== Breakdancing ==
Great Britain qualified two dancers based on its rankings.

Individual

Team	Event	Group stage				Quarterfinal	Semifinal	Final / BM	
Team	Event	Opposition Score	Opposition Score	Opposition Score	Rank	Opposition Score	Opposition Score	Opposition Score	Rank
Karam Singh (B-Boy Karam)	B-Boy	Lee (NED); L 0–2 (4–14)	Exaggerate (NOR); D 1–1 (10–8)	Daniel (NOR); W 2–0 (13–5)	2 Q	Menno (NED); L 0–2 (5–13)	Did not advance		
Sunni Brummitt (B-Boy Sunni)	B-Boy	Lucky (BEL); W 2–0 (16–2)	Menno (NED); L 0–2 (1–17)	Wigor (POL); L 0–2 (7–11)	3	Did not advance			

== Canoe Sprint ==
Athlete	Event	Heats		Semi-final		Final	
Athlete	Event	Time	Rank	Time	Rank	Time	Rank
Izzy Evans	Women's C-1 200 metres	48.958	5 SF	49.364	3 FA	59.259	9
Katie Reid; Beth Gill	Women's C-2 500 metres	2:06.410	5 SF	2:07.485	4	Did Not Advance	
Jonathan Jones; Ben Phillips	Men's C-2 500 metres	1:46.581	6 SF	1:48.454	7	Did Not Advance	
Deborah Kerr; Emily Lewis; Emma Russell; Rebii Simon	Women's K-4 500 metres	1:35.804	3 FA	—N/a		1:34.931	8

Qualification legend: SF – Qualify to semifinal; FA – Qualify to medal final; FB – Qualify to non-medal final

== Canoe Slalom ==
Men

Athlete	Event	Preliminary				Quarter-final		Semi-final		Final	
Athlete	Event	Run 1	Rank	Run 2	Rank	Time	Rank	Time	Rank	Time	Rank
Adam Burgess	C-1	91.97	6 Q	—N/a				95.89	2 Q	101.36	7
James Kettle	C-1	100.23	28	95.20	6 Q	—N/a		106.79	22	Did.not advance	
Ryan Westley	C-1	91.77	5 Q	—N/a				99.21	6 Q	94.01	1st place, gold medalist(s)
Chris Bowers	K-1	91.18	33	86.99	1 Q	—N/a		140.99	35	Did not advance	
Joe Clarke	K-1	88.56	18 Q	—N/a				92.29	10 Q	89.80	3rd place, bronze medalist(s)
Jonny Dickson	K-1	88.03	14 Q	—N/a				142.92	38	Did not advance	
Chris Bowers	Kayak cross	63.09	5 Q	—N/a		FLT(1)	4	Did not advance			
Joe Clarke	Kayak cross	73.62 FLT(4)	50	—N/a		Did not advance					
Jonny Dickson	Kayak cross	64.94	15 Q	—N/a		FLT(3)	4	Did not advance			
Adam Burgess; James Kettle; Ryan Westley	C-1 team	—N/a								107.84	3rd place, bronze medalist(s)
Chris Bowers; Joe Clarke; Jonny Dickson	K-1 team	—N/a								146.46	13

Women

Athlete	Event	Preliminary				Quarter-final		Semi-final		Final	
Athlete	Event	Run 1	Rank	Run 2	Rank	Time	Rank	Time	Rank	Time	Rank
Mallory Franklin	C-1	105.78	7 Q	—N/a				115.36	10 Q	113.63	3rd place, bronze medalist(s)
Sophie Ogilvie	C-1	114.19	23	124.16	15	—N/a		Did not advance			
Kimberley Woods	C-1	120.31	31	106.49	1 Q	—N/a		123.66	22	Did not advance	
Mallory Franklin	K-1	98.32	11 Q	—N/a				103.83	8 Q	107.93	=9
Phoebe Spicer	K-1	112.28	33	106.36	7 Q	—N/a		108.82	20	Did not advance	
Kimberley Woods	K-1	97.83	8 Q	—N/a				103.79	7 Q	107.53	7
Mallory Franklin	Kayak cross	69.38	11 Q	—N/a		FLT(3)	4	Did not advance			
Phoebe Spicer	Kayak cross	71.41	25	—N/a				Did not advance			
Kimberley Woods	Kayak cross	69.47	12 Q	—N/a		–	1 Q	FLT(4)	4	Did not advance	
Mallory Franklin; Sophie Ogilvie; Kimberley Woods	C-1 team	—N/a								120.34	2nd place, silver medalist(s)
Mallory Franklin; Phoebe Spicer; Kimberley Woods	K-1 team	—N/a								121.89	7

== Cycling ==
=== Mountain Bike ===
Athlete	Event	Time	Rank
Cameron Mason	Men's cross country	1:21.17	12
Cameron Orr	Men's cross country	1:21.51	17
Annie Last	Women's cross country	Did not finish	

=== BMX freestyle ===
Athlete	Event	Seeding				Final		
Athlete	Event	Run 1	Run 2	Average	Rank	Run 1	Run 2	Rank
Declan Brooks	Men's park	79.40	77.33	78.37	6 Q	87.40	~~78.56~~	3rd place, bronze medalist(s)
Kieran Reilly	Men's park	80.16	80.33	80.25	3 Q	~~88.96~~	92.33	1st place, gold medalist(s)
Charlotte Worthington	Women's park	DNS						
Sasha Pardoe	Women's park	63.00	72.33	67.66	5 Q	DNS		
Holly Pipe	Women's park	33.33	39.66	36.33	12 Q	~~42.00~~	55.66	8

== Diving ==
Great Britain selected a team of 14 divers for the European Games. Eleven divers were selected instead for the 2023 World Aquatics Championships. The Kraków team includes veterans of 2015 including James Heatly and Grace Reid.

Men

Athlete	Events	Preliminary		Final	
Athlete	Events	Points	Rank	Points	Rank
Ross Haslam	1 m springboard	386.45	4 Q	422.95	1st place, gold medalist(s)
James Heatly	1 m springboard	335.90	10 Q	323.30	12
Ross Haslam	3 m springboard	430.70	1 Q	403.35	4
Matthew Dixon	3 m springboard	398.65	5 Q	401.05	6
Ben Cutmore	10 m platform	373.35	6 Q	410.75	4
Robbie Lee	10 m platform	424.35	2 Q	413.20	2nd place, silver medalist(s)
Ross Haslam; James Heatly	3 m synchronized springboard	—N/a		393.45	4
Ben Cutmore; Matthew Dixon	10 m synchronized platform	—N/a		372.69	3rd place, bronze medalist(s)

Women

Athlete	Events	Preliminary		Final	
Athlete	Events	Points	Rank	Points	Rank
Grace Reid	1 m springboard	254.50	3 Q	266.90	3rd place, bronze medalist(s)
Holly-May Prasanto	1 m springboard	208.80	16	Did not advance	
Grace Reid	3 m springboard	300.60	1 Q	298.55	5
Desharne Bent-Ashmeil	3 m springboard	288.45	4 Q	293.10	6
Robyn Birch	10 m platform	277.55	4 Q	289.25	5
Eden Cheng	10 m platform	299.35	1 Q	331.60	1st place, gold medalist(s)
Desharne Bent-Ashmeil; Amy Rollinson	3 m synchronized springboard	—N/a		279.90	1st place, gold medalist(s)
Maisie Bond; Juliette John	10 m synchronized platform	—N/a		198.90	8

Mixed

Athlete	Events	Final	
Athlete	Events	Points	Rank
James Heatly; Grace Reid	3 m synchronized springboard	283.89	2nd place, silver medalist(s)
Maisie Bond; Noah Penman	10 m synchronized platform	265.08	5
Robbie Lee; Eden Cheng; Desharne Bent-Ashmeil; Ben Cutmore	Team	231.95	7

== Fencing ==
Great Britain nominated the following fencers on 1 June 2023.

Teams

Athletes	Event	Round of 16	Quarter-final	Semi-final	Final	Rank
Kristjan Archer; Jaimie Cook; James-Andrew Davis; Marcus Mepstead	Men's team foil	Czech Republic (CZE); W 45–44	Ukraine (UKR); W 45–37	Italy (ITA); L 29–45	Bronze medal match Germany (GER); L 43—45	4
Kate Beardmore; Yasmin Campbell; Carolina Stutchbury; Amelie Tsang	Women's team foil	Austria (AUT); L 37–45	Did not advance			9

Individuals

Athlete	Event	Group stage						Rank	Knockout stage						Final rank
Athlete	Event	Match 1	Match 2	Match 3	Match 4	Match 5	Match 6	Rank	1/32 final	1/16 final	1/8 final	1/4 final	1/2 final	Medal final	Final rank
Ben Andrews	Men's Epeé	Nikolovski (MKD); W	Galabov (BUL); L	Schmidt (GER); L	Tulen (NED); L	Svensson (SWE); W	Kalininas (LTU); W	46 Q	Bayard (SUI); L 8–15	Did not advance					50
Susan Sica	Women's Epeé	Leonte (ROU); W	Kuusk (EST); L	Favre (SUI); L	Bezhura (UKR); L	Mateos (ESP); W	—N/a	48 Q	Brovko (UKR); W 15–12	Muhari (HUN); L 12–15	Did not advance				31
Kristjan Archer	Men's Foil	Hatoel (ISR); W	Siess (POL); L	Komsic (CRO); W	Soulios (GRE); W	Karlsen (DEN); W	Galuashvili (GEO); L	31 Q	Spoljar (CRO); L 11–15	Did not advance					39
Jaimie Cook	Men's Foil	Filippi (ITA); L	Tzovanis (GRE); W	Fazekas (SVK); W	Ettelt (AUT); W	Gaganidze (GEO); W	Geudvert (BEL); W	11 Q	Tzovanis (GRE); W 15–5	Rieger (GER); L 4–15	Did not advance				20
James-Andrew Davis	Men's Foil	Eyupoglu (TUR); W	Breteau (ESP); W	Wojtkowiak (POL); W	Manolikas (GRE); L	Dadayan (ARM); W	Serri (SVK); L	19 Q	Geudvert (BEL); W 15–10	Yunes (UKR); L 10–15	Did not advance				22
Marcus Mepstead	Men's Foil	Yuno (NED); L	Toth (HUN); W	Kahl (GER); L	Rosu (ROU); W	Supe (LAT); L	Hertsyk (UKR); W	40 Q	Serri (SVK); W 15–12	Rosa (HUN); W 15–13	Van Campenhout (UKR); L WD	Did not advance			16
Kate Beardmore	Women's Foil	Josan (MDA); W	Dinca (ROU); W	Pasztor (HUN); W	Groslambert (BEL); W	Castro (ESP); W	Myroniuk (UKR); W	4 Q	Bye	Lupkovics (HUN); W 15–9	Druck (ISR); L 7–15	Did not advance			12
Yasmin Campbell	Women's Foil	Bimova (CZE); L	Konto'poulou (GRE); L	Lyczbinska (POL); L	Dobrinina (MDA); W	Druck (ISR); L	Marino (ESP); L	38	Did not advance						38
Carolina Stutchbury	Women's Foil	Zurawska (POL); W	Lupkovics (HUN); W	Corbu (ROU); W	Caride (POR); W	Blazic (CRO); W	Mekra (GRE); W	1 Q	Bye	Brugger (AUT); W 12–8	Calugareanu (ROU); L 10–15	Did not advance			9
Amelie Tsang	Women's Foil	Jeglinska (POL); W	Kagan Tyagunov (ISR); W	Wohlgemuth (AUT); W	Kondricz (HUN); L	Chaldiou (GRE); L	Breteau (ESP); L	27 Q	Bye	Cipressa (ITA); L 13–15	Did not advance				27
Will Deary	Men's Sabre	Bazadze (GEO); L	Decsi (HUN); W	Aslan (TUR); W	Stasiak (POL); W	Agustsson (ISL); W	Cacek (CZE); W	10 Q	Bye	Cidu (ROU); W 15–8	Bonah (GER); W 15–10	Samele (ITA); W 15–14	Kaczkowski (POL); L 14–15	Did not advance	3rd place, bronze medalist(s)
JJ Webb	Men's Sabre	Gemesi (HUN); L	Matteo Neri (ITA); L	Filev (BUL); L	Mammadov (AZE); W	Hyrciuk (POL); L	—N/a	44 Q	Decsi (HUN); L WD	Did not advance					44
Caitlin Maxwell	Women's Sabre	Jijieishvili (GEO); W	Criscio (ITA); W	Matei (ROU); L	Battai (HUN); W	Komaschuk (UKR); W	—N/a	10 Q	Bye	Gregorio (ITA); L 8–15	Did not advance				19

== Modern Pentathlon ==
Great Britain announced a team of eight pentathletes to compete in Kraków, including Olympic champion Joe Choong. On 7 July, Emma Whitaker was named to replace the injured Charlie Follett.

Men

Athlete	Event	Fencing (épée one touch)				Swimming (200 m freestyle)			Riding (show jumping)			Combined: shooting/running (10 m air pistol)/(3200 m)			Total points	Final rank
Athlete	Event	RR	BR	Rank	MP points	Time	Rank	MP points	Penalties	Rank	MP points	Time	Rank	MP Points	Total points	Final rank
Charlie Brown	Individual	17–18	2	18	212	2:00.98	6	309	20	13	280	10:08.70	6	692	1493	11
Joe Choong	Individual	22–13	2	5	237	2:01.52	8	307	8	6	292	10:05.70	5	695	1531	2nd place, silver medalist(s)
Sam Curry	Individual	Did not qualify for the Final														
Myles Pillage	Individual	21–14	0	6	230	1:56.28	1	318	14	11	286	10:10.90	7	690	1524	4
Charlie Brown; Joe Choong; Myles Pillage	Team	—N/a			679	—N/a		934	—N/a		858	—N/a		2077	4548	1st place, gold medalist(s)

Women

Athlete	Event	Fencing (épée one touch)				Swimming (200 m freestyle)			Riding (show jumping)			Combined: shooting/running (10 m air pistol)/(3200 m)			Total points	Final rank
Athlete	Event	RR	BR	Rank	MP points	Time	Rank	MP points	Penalties	Rank	MP points	Time	Rank	MP Points	Total points	Final rank
Kerenza Bryson	Individual	21–14	2	5	232	2:22.59	17	265	14	12	286	11:06.30	6	634	1417	6
Olivia Green	Individual	18–17	2	21	217	2:14.35	6	282	14	13	286	10:57.40	3	643	1428	3rd place, bronze medalist(s)
Jess Varley	Individual	Did not qualify for the Final.														
Emma Whitaker	Individual	20–15	0	8	225	2:17.43	10	276	8	11	292	12:50.10	18	530	1323	17
Kerenza Bryson; Olivia Green; Emma Whitaker	Team	—N/a			674	—N/a		823	—N/a		864	—N/a		1807	4168	4

Mixed

Athlete	Event	Fencing (épée one touch)				Swimming (200 m freestyle)			Riding (show jumping)			Combined: shooting/running (10 m air pistol)/(3200 m)			Total points	Final rank
Athlete	Event	RR	BR	Rank	MP points	Time	Rank	MP points	Penalties	Rank	MP points	Time	Rank	MP Points	Total points	Final rank
Sam Curry; Jess Varley	Team	13–13	2	10	217	2:00.21	7	310	0	1	300	12:12.70	4	568	1395	3rd place, bronze medalist(s)

== Rugby sevens ==
Great Britain qualified both a men's and women's team for the rugby sevens tournament in Kraków. 26 athletes were named on 1 June 2023.

Summary

Athletes	Event	Group stage				Quarter-final	Semi-final / Cl.	Final / BM / Pl.	
Athletes	Event	Opponent Result	Opponent Result	Opponent Result	Rank	Opponent Result	Opponent Result	Opponent Result	Rank
James Barden; Kaleem Barreto; Api Bavadra; Alex Davis; Tom Emery; Robbie Fergusson; Will Homer / Ross McCann; Max McFarland; Freddie Roddick; Femi Sofolarin; Morgan Williams; Tom Williams	Men's	Romania; W 45–0	Lithuania; W 24–0	Portugal; W 31–5	1 Q	Germany; W 14–10	Spain; W 19–7	Ireland; L 12–26	2nd place, silver medalist(s)
Ellie Boatman; Abbie Brown; Shona Campbell; Heather Cowell; Megan Jones; Lisa Thomson; Lauren Torley / Jasmin Joyce; Rhona Lloyd; Isla Norman-Bell; Jade Shekells; Emma Uren; Amy Wilson-Hardy	Women's	Norway; W 55–0	Italy; W 36–5	Czech Republic; W 37–5	1 Q	Germany; W 53–0	Belgium; W 36–12	Poland; W 33–0	1st place, gold medalist(s)

== Shooting ==
Great Britain announced a team of 15 shooters.

Pistol

Athlete	Event	Qualification		Final	
Athlete	Event	Points	Rank	Points	Rank
Kristian Callaghan	Men's 10 m air pistol	570	29	Did not advance	
James Miller	Men's 10 m air pistol	577	14	Did not advance	
Kristian Callaghan	Men's 25 m rapid fire pistol	558	24	Did not advance	
Sam Gowin	Men's 25 m rapid fire pistol	572	16	Did not advance	
Jess Liddon	Women's 10 m air pistol	563	27	Did not advance	
Jess Liddon	Women's 25 m pistol	561	33	Did not advance	
Kristian Callaghan; Jess Liddon	Mixed team 10 m air pistol	566	23	Did not advance	
Sam Gowin; Jess Liddon	Mixed team 25 m rapid fire pistol	Part 1; 555; Part 2; 359	4 Q 6	Did not advance	

Rifle

Athlete	Event	Qualification		Final	
Athlete	Event	Points	Rank	Points	Rank
Michael Bargeron	Men's 50 m rifle three positions	584-33x	24	Did not advance	
Seonaid McIntosh	Women's 10 m air rifle	627.2	14	Did not advance	
Katie Gleeson	Women's 50 m rifle three positions	578-22x	27	Did not advance	
Seonaid McIntosh	Women's 50 m rifle three positions	591-38x	2 Q	406.5	3rd place, bronze medalist(s)
Michael Bargeron; Seonaid McIntosh	Mixed team 10 m air rifle	625.6	17	Did not advance	
Michael Bargeron; Katie Gleeson	Mixed team 50 m rifle three positions	Part 1; 869-38x	16	Did not advance	

Shotgun

Men

Athlete	Event	Qualification		Ranking match		Final	
Athlete	Event	Points	Rank	Points	Rank	Points	Rank
Matthew Coward-Holley	Trap	121	9	Did not advance			
Aaron Heading	Trap	120	12	Did not advance			
Freddie Killander	Skeet	119	25	Did not advance			
Ben Llewellin	Skeet	123	6 Q	17	4	Did not advance	

Women

Athlete	Event	Qualification		Ranking match		Final	
Athlete	Event	Points	Rank	Points	Rank	Points	Rank
Lucy Hall	Trap	116	10	Did not advance			
Georgina Roberts	Trap	113	19	Did not advance			
Emily Hibbs	Skeet	115	14	Did not advance			
Amber Rutter	Skeet	123	1 Q	16	4	Did not advance	

Mixed

Athlete	Event	Qualification		Final / BM	
Athlete	Event	Points	Rank	Points	Rank
Matthew Coward-Holley; Lucy Hall	Team trap	144	1 Q	Italy (ITA); L 4–6	2nd place, silver medalist(s)
Aaron Heading; Georgina Roberts	Team trap	138	17	Did not advance	
Freddie Killander; Emily Hibbs	Team skeet	141	14	Did not advance	
Ben Llewellin; Amber Rutter	Team skeet	147	3 Q	Bronze medal match Ukraine (UKR); W 6–4	3rd place, bronze medalist(s)

== Sports climbing ==
Great Britain confirmed that six quotas would be taken up in sports climbing, but delayed the release of the names of those selected. On 7 July, Team GB announced 5 climbers. Dayan Akhtar and Sam Butterworth will compete in the men's boulder, with Matthew Fall and Rafe Stokes in contention for the men's speed. Lucy Garlick completes the line-up as she prepares to take part in the women's lead.

Technical

Athlete	Event	Semifinal		Final	
Athlete	Event	Result	Rank	Result	Rank
Dayan Akhtar	Men's boulder	2T4z 8 9	1 Q	1T3z 2 7	4
Sam Butterworth	Men's boulder	0T1z 0 4	16	Did not advance	
Lucy Garlick	Women's lead	29+	14	Did not advance	

Speed

Athlete	Event	Seeding		Elimination	Quarterfinal	Semifinal	Final	
Athlete	Event	Time	Rank	Opposition Time	Opposition Time	Opposition Time	Opposition Time	Rank
Matthew Fall	Men's speed	10.229	13	Zurloni (ITA); W 6.561	Rebrevend (FRA); L 6.293	Did not advance		
Rafe Stokes	Men's speed	6.011	9	Szalecki (POL); W 6.044	Knapp (AUT); L Fall	Did not advance		

== Table Tennis ==
Great Britain secured four quotas for the singles events and a position in the men's team event.

Athlete	Event	Round 1	Round 2	Round of 32	Round of 16	Quarterfinal	Semi-final	Final / BM	
Athlete	Event	Opposition Result	Opposition Result	Opposition Result	Opposition Result	Opposition Result	Opposition Result	Opposition Result	Rank
Liam Pitchford	Men's singles	Bye		Habesohn (AUT); L 3–4	Did not advance				
Paul Drinkhall	Men's singles	Bye	Pryshchepa (UKR); W 4–3	Qiu (GER); L 0–4	Did not advance				
Paul Drinkhall; Liam Pitchford; Sam Walker; Tom Jarvis	Men's team	Bye	—N/a		Romania (ROU); L 1–3	Did not advance			
Charlotte Carey	Women's singles	Bye	Brateyko (UKR); L 0–4	Did not advance					
Tin-Tin Ho	Women's singles	Bye	Pavade (FRA); L 0–4	Did not advance					
Tin-Tin Ho; Liam Pitchford	Mixed doubles	—N/a			Pistej / Balazova (SVK); L 1-3	Did not advance			

== Taekwondo ==
Great Britain selected 12 taekwondo athletes for the 2023 European Games, announcing them on 1 June 2003.

Men

Athlete	Event	Round of 16	Quarterfinal	Semi-final	Repechage	Final / BM	
Athlete	Event	Opposition Result	Opposition Result	Opposition Result	Opposition Result	Opposition Result	Rank
Zach Thomas Sarsoza	-54 kg	Molle (NED); L 0–2	Did not advance				
Mo Nour	-58 kg	Dayioglu (TUR); W 2–0	Woolley (IRL); L 1–2	Did not advance	Alami (SWE); W 3–0	Bronze medal final Ravet (FRA); L 0–2	5
Bradly Sinden	-68 kg	Chumachenko (UKR); W 2–0	Joergensen (DEN); W 2–0	Glasnovic (CRO); W 2–1	—N/a	Perez Polo (ESP); L WD	2nd place, silver medalist(s)
Caden Cunningham	+87 kg	Pilipovic (NOR); W 2–0	Atesli (TUR); W 2–0	Bozic (CRO); W 2–0	—N/a	Georgievski (MKD); W 2–0	1st place, gold medalist(s)

=== Women ===
Athlete	Event	Round of 16	Quarterfinal	Semi-final	Repechage	Final / BM	
Athlete	Event	Opposition Result	Opposition Result	Opposition Result	Opposition Result	Opposition Result	Rank
Phoenix Goodman	-46 kg	Jimenez (ESP); W 2–1	Stojkovic (CRO); L 0–2	Did not advance	Csaki (HUN); W 2–0	Bronze medal final Celik (GER); L 0–2	5
Maddison Moore	-49 kg	Kamka'phou (FRA); W 2–0	Dincel (TUR); L 0–2	Did not advance		Bronze medal final Semberg (ISR); W 2–1	3rd place, bronze medalist(s)
Jodie McKew	-53 kg	Bogdanović (SRB); W 2–1	Patakfalvy (HUN); L 1–2	Did not advance			
Jade Jones	-57 kg	Gretarsdottir (ISL); W 2–0	Ortiz Benito (ESP); W 2–0	Tomic (CRO); W 1–0 WD	—N/a	Marton (HUN); W 2–0	1st place, gold medalist(s)
Aaliyah Powell	-62 kg	Magdaleno Albizu (ESP); W 2–0	Szpak (POL); W 2–0	Chaari (BEL); L 0–2	—N/a	Bronze medal final Reljikj (MKD); W 2–0	3rd place, bronze medalist(s)
Chloe Roberts	-67 kg	Koerndl (GER); L 1–2	Did not advance				
Rebecca McGowan	-73 kg	Haugen (HUN); W 2–0	Klepac (CRO); L WD	Did not advance			
Bianca Cook	+73 kg	Bye	Castineira Etcheverria (ESP); W 2–0	Kowalczuk (POL); L 1–2	—N/a	Bronze medal final Boyadzhieva (BUL); L 0–2	5

== Triathlon ==
Great Britain qualified for three quota places in both the men's and women's events. This also entitled them to enter a team in the mixed relay. As with diving, a World Triathlon Championship Series event is taking place in close proximity, and Great Britain have employed a split squad, with most of the higher ranked athletes, excepting Barclay, competing in Montréal.

Athlete	Event	Swim (1.5 km)	Trans 1	Bike (40 km)	Trans 2	Run (10 km)	Total time	Rank
Connor Bentley	Men's triathlon	18.21	0.55	56.42	0.26	34.01	1:50.22	32
Barclay Izzard	Men's triathlon	19.04	0.49	56.08	0.23	30.58	1:47.21	9
Hamish Reilly	Men's triathlon	18.28	0.51	58.13	0.29	33.07	1:51.06	35
Sophie Alden	Women's triathlon	19.19	0.58	1:01.48	0.30	37.54	2:00.27	18
Hollie Elliott	Women's triathlon	20.43	0.59	1:03.39	0.30	37.29	2:03.18	28
Sian Rainsley	Women's triathlon	19.47	0.56	1:01.18	0.30	35.42	1:58.12	11
Barclay Izzard; Sophie Alden; Connor Bentley; Sian Rainsley; Total	Mixed relay	3.52 3.59 3.39 4.06	0.26 0.31 0.31 0.30	7.01 7.36 6.59 7.30	0.29 0.29 0.27 0.29	4.17 4.59 4.11 5.10	16.04 17.41 15.56 17.54; 1:07.33	2nd place, silver medalist(s)
