= 2023 European Diving Championships – Women's 3 metre springboard =

Women's 3 metre springboard at the 2023 European Diving Championships
- Venue: Rzeszów Diving Arena
- Date: 25 June
- Competitors: 25 from 17 nations
- Winning points: 321.45

Medalists
gold medal	Chiara Pellacani	Italy
silver medal	Emilia Nilsson Garip	Sweden
bronze medal	Michelle Heimberg	Switzerland

The women's 3 metre springboard event at the 2023 European Diving Championships was held on 25 June 2023.

== Results ==
The preliminary round was started at 10:00. The final was held at 18:00.

Green denotes finalists

Rank	Diver	Nation	Preliminary		Final	
Rank	Diver	Nation	Points	Rank	Points	Rank
1st place, gold medalist(s)	Chiara Pellacani	Italy	300.50	2	321.45	1
2nd place, silver medalist(s)	Emilia Nilsson Garip	Sweden	287.90	6	316.60	2
3rd place, bronze medalist(s)	Michelle Heimberg	Switzerland	291.55	3	306.70	3
4	Lena Hentschel	Germany	272.75	8	304.95	4
5	Grace Reid	Great Britain	300.60	1	298.55	5
6	Desharne Bent-Ashmeil	Great Britain	288.45	4	293.10	6
7	Helle Tuxen	Norway	262.35	10	285.50	7
8	Rocío Velázquez	Spain	250.15	12	272.55	8
9	Saskia Oettinghaus	Germany	274.95	7	257.80	9
10	Clare Cryan	Ireland	288.45	4	254.50	10
11	Madeline Coquoz	Switzerland	269.95	9	249.70	11
12	Elna Widerström	Sweden	256.80	11	174.55	12
13	Anna Pysmenska	Ukraine	240.95	13	Did not advance	
14	Elisa Pizzini	Italy	238.15	14	Did not advance	
15	Juliette Landi	France	231.90	15	Did not advance	
16	Celine van Duijn	Netherlands	227.50	16	Did not advance	
17	Lauren Hallaselkä	Finland	224.85	17	Did not advance	
18	Amelie Foerster	Romania	224.35	18	Did not advance	
19	Tereza Jelínková	Czech Republic	221.40	19	Did not advance	
20	Cara Albiez	Austria	218.85	20	Did not advance	
21	Kaja Skrzek	Poland	212.45	21	Did not advance	
22	Estilla Mosena	Hungary	207.25	22	Did not advance	
23	Aleksandra Błażowska	Poland	201.60	23	Did not advance	
24	Patrícia Kun	Hungary	199.20	24	Did not advance	
25	Caroline Kupka	Norway	197.25	25	Did not advance	
