= 2023 European Diving Championships – Men's 3 metre springboard =

Men's 3 metre springboard at the 2023 European Diving Championships
- Venue: Rzeszów Diving Arena
- Date: 24 June
- Competitors: 31 from 18 nations
- Winning points: 465.40

Medalists
gold medal	Moritz Wesemann	Germany
silver medal	Jules Bouyer	France
bronze medal	Alexis Jandard	France

The men's 3 metre springboard event at the 2023 European Diving Championships was held on 24 June 2023.

== Results ==
The preliminary round was started at 10:00. The final was held at 19:00.

Green denotes finalists

Rank	Diver	Nationality	Preliminary		Final	
Rank	Diver	Nationality	Points	Rank	Points	Rank
1st place, gold medalist(s)	Moritz Wesemann	Germany	418.60	2	465.40	1
2nd place, silver medalist(s)	Jules Bouyer	France	386.00	9	440.15	2
3rd place, bronze medalist(s)	Alexis Jandard	France	399.40	6	430.70	3
4	Ross Haslam	Great Britain	430.70	1	403.35	4
5	Oleh Kolodiy	Ukraine	408.15	3	402.20	5
6	Matthew Dixon	Great Britain	398.65	7	401.05	6
7	Giovanni Tocci	Italy	401.90	4	400.45	7
8	Jonathan Suckow	Switzerland	389.45	8	397.50	8
9	Lorenzo Marsaglia	Italy	399.95	5	395.70	9
10	Jake Passmore	Ireland	385.05	10	383.70	10
11	Lars Rüdiger	Germany	381.30	12	380.00	11
12	Danylo Konovalov	Ukraine	383.25	11	371.60	12
13	Alberto Arévalo	Spain	376.30	13	Did not advance	
14	Andrzej Rzeszutek	Poland	375.45	14	Did not advance	
15	Nicolás García	Spain	375.10	15	Did not advance	
16	Kasper Lesiak	Poland	372.65	16	Did not advance	
17	Guillaume Dutoit	Switzerland	366.20	17	Did not advance	
18	Nikolaj Schaller	Austria	363.00	18	Did not advance	
19	David Ekdahl	Sweden	357.45	19	Did not advance	
20	Matej Nevešćanin	Croatia	355.80	20	Did not advance	
21	Alexander Hart	Austria	355.45	21	Did not advance	
22	Elias Petersen	Sweden	345.30	22	Did not advance	
23	Tornike Onikashvili	Georgia	325.70	23	Did not advance	
24	Alexandru Avasiloae	Romania	314.30	24	Did not advance	
25	Athanasios Tsirikos	Greece	299.40	25	Did not advance	
26	Luka Martinović	Croatia	297.60	26	Did not advance	
27	Theofilos Afthinos	Greece	282.30	27	Did not advance	
28	Nikola Paraušić	Serbia	254.35	28	Did not advance	
29	Sandro Melikidze	Georgia	249.85	29	Did not advance	
30	Josef Hugo Šorejs	Czech Republic	247.10	30	Did not advance	
31	Martynas Lisauskas	Lithuania	245.85	31	Did not advance	
