= 2023 European Diving Championships – Mixed synchronized 3 metre springboard =

Mixed synchronized 3 metre springboard at the 2023 European Diving Championships
- Venue: Rzeszów Diving Arena
- Date: 23 June
- Competitors: 22 from 11 nations
- Teams: 11
- Winning points: 291.39

Medalists
gold medal	Matteo Santoro; Chiara Pellacani	Italy
silver medal	James Heatly; Grace Reid	Great Britain
bronze medal	Elias Petersen; Emilia Nilsson Garip	Sweden

The mixed synchronized 3 metre springboard event at the 2023 European Diving Championships was held on 23 June 2023.

== Results ==
The final was held at 15:00.

Rank	Nation	Divers	D1	D2	D3	D4	D5	Total
1st place, gold medalist(s)	Italy	Matteo Santoro; Chiara Pellacani	46.80	42.60	67.50	67.89	66.60	291.39
2nd place, silver medalist(s)	Great Britain	James Heatly; Grace Reid	48.00	45.00	64.80	58.59	67.50	283.89
3rd place, bronze medalist(s)	Sweden	Elias Petersen; Emilia Nilsson Garip	46.80	46.80	57.60	65.70	65.70	282.60
4	Germany	Alexander Lube; Jana Rother	45.60	41.40	61.20	65.70	65.10	279.00
5	Spain	Carlos Camacho; Rocío Velázquez	45.00	41.40	59.52	59.40	61.20	266.52
6	Ireland	Jake Passmore; Clare Cryan	46.20	44.40	59.40	58.80	51.15	259.95
7	Poland	Andrzej Rzeszutek; Kaja Skrzek	40.80	43.80	57.66	54.00	61.20	257.46
8	Norway	Isak Børslien; Caroline Kupka	42.60	44.40	56.28	53.10	51.24	247.62
9	Ukraine	Kyrylo Azarov; Hanna Pysmenska	45.00	44.40	66.60	64.80	26.10	246.90
10	Romania	Alexandru Avasiloae; Amelie Foerster	43.80	42.00	55.08	50.40	48.24	239.52
11	Switzerland	Thibaud Bucher; Madeline Coquoz	41.40	40.80	54.00	54.90	40.92	232.02
