= Diving at the 2024 European Aquatics Championships – Women's 1 m springboard =

Women's 1 m springboard at the 2024 European Aquatics Championships
- Venue: Serbian Institute for Sports and Sports Medicine
- Dates: 18 June
- Competitors: 20 from 13 nations
- Winning points: 250.25

Medalists
| gold medal | Elna Widerström | Sweden |
| silver medal | Aleksandra Błażowska | Poland |
| bronze medal | Emilia Nilsson Garip | Sweden |

The Women's 1 m springboard competition of the 2024 European Aquatics Championships was held on 18 June 2024.

== Results ==
The preliminary round was started at 10:00. The final was held at 16:55.

Green denotes finalists

| Rank | Diver | Nationality | Preliminary | | Final | |
| Rank | Diver | Nationality | Points | Rank | Points | Rank |
|---|---|---|---|---|---|---|
| 1st place, gold medalist(s) | Elna Widerström | Sweden | 241.90 | 1 | 250.25 | 1 |
| 2nd place, silver medalist(s) | Aleksandra Błażowska | Poland | 207.80 | 10 | 231.35 | 2 |
| 3rd place, bronze medalist(s) | Emilia Nilsson Garip | Sweden | 239.45 | 2 | 230.15 | 3 |
| 4 | Lize van Leeuwen | Netherlands | 204.75 | 12 | 218.10 | 4 |
| 5 | Jana Lisa Rother | Germany | 211.00 | 8 | 215.70 | 5 |
| 6 | Matilde Borello | Italy | 218.55 | 6 | 214.35 | 6 |
| 7 | Lauren Hallaselkä | Finland | 216.20 | 7 | 211.70 | 7 |
| 8 | Lotti Hubert | Germany | 229.25 | 5 | 200.70 | 8 |
| 9 | Helle Tuxen | Norway | 209.80 | 9 | 229.25 | 9 |
| 10 | Amy Rollinson | Great Britain | 231.10 | 4 | 228.10 | 10 |
| 11 | Clare Cryan | Ireland | 205.85 | 11 | 227.75 | 11 |
| 12 | Elettra Neroni | Italy | 237.00 | 3 | 221.95 | 12 |
| 13 | Tereza Jelínková | Slovakia | 198.90 | 13 | Did not advance | |
| 14 | Odessa Kack | Finland | 193.15 | 14 | Did not advance | |
| 15 | Sude Köprülü | Turkey | 191.10 | 15 | Did not advance | |
| 16 | Caroline Kupka | Norway | 185.45 | 16 | Did not advance | |
| 17 | Tilly Brown | Great Britain | 176.75 | 17 | Did not advance | |
| 18 | Mariami Shanidze | Georgia | 168.65 | 18 | Did not advance | |
| 19 | Katarina Ilić | Serbia | 126.65 | 19 | Did not advance | |
| 20 | Tara Vesić | Serbia | 125.60 | 20 | Did not advance | |
