= Muaythai at the 2023 European Games – Women's 57 kg =

Muaythai competition

Women's 57 kg at the 2023 European Games
- Venue: Myślenice Arena
- Date: 25–28 June
- Competitors: 8 from 8 nations

Medalists
gold medal	Patricia Axling	Sweden
silver medal	Matilde Melo	Portugal
bronze medal	Aysu Devrishova	Azerbaijan
bronze medal	Miina Sirkeoja	Finland

Women's 57 kg competition at the Muaythai at the 2023 European Games in Kraków, Poland, took place on 25–28 June at the Myślenice Arena.

== Results ==
Quarterfinals
Željana Piteša (CRO)	26
Aysu Devrishova (AZE)	30
Patricia Axling (SWE)	30
Gabriela Kuzawińska (POL)	27
Miina Sirkeoja (FIN)	30
Věra Korbášová (CZE)	27
Anne Sandegård (DEN)	27
Matilde Melo (POR)	30

Semifinals
Aysu Devrishova (AZE)
Patricia Axling (SWE)	CCL R3
Miina Sirkeoja (FIN)	27
Matilde Melo (POR)	30

Final
Patricia Axling (SWE)	30
Matilde Melo (POR)	27
