= 2023 European Diving Championships – Men's 1 metre springboard =

Men's 1 metre springboard at the 2023 European Diving Championships
- Venue: Rzeszów Diving Arena
- Date: 26 June
- Competitors: 31 from 19 nations
- Winning points: 422.95

Medalists
gold medal	Ross Haslam	Great Britain
silver medal	Alexis Jandard	France
bronze medal	Lorenzo Marsaglia	Italy

The men's 1 metre springboard event at the 2023 European Diving Championships was held on 26 June 2023.

== Results ==
The preliminary round was started at 10:00. The final was held at 18:00.

Green denotes finalists

Rank	Diver	Nationality	Preliminary		Final	
Rank	Diver	Nationality	Points	Rank	Points	Rank
1st place, gold medalist(s)	Ross Haslam	Great Britain	386.45	3	422.95	1
2nd place, silver medalist(s)	Alexis Jandard	France	384.00	4	411.50	2
3rd place, bronze medalist(s)	Lorenzo Marsaglia	Italy	361.05	6	410.55	3
4	Jules Bouyer	France	377.05	5	403.90	4
5	Giovanni Tocci	Italy	397.25	1	401.95	5
6	Alberto Arévalo	Spain	346.20	9	377.95	6
7	Moritz Wesemann	Germany	388.35	2	377.20	7
8	Alexander Lube	Germany	326.70	11	376.75	8
9	Danylo Konovalov	Ukraine	355.50	7	375.60	9
10	Jonathan Suckow	Switzerland	346.30	8	358.80	10
11	Jake Passmore	Ireland	326.70	11	327.85	11
12	James Heatly	Great Britain	335.90	10	323.30	12
13	Stanislav Oliferchyk	Ukraine	326.00	13	Did not advance	
14	Isak Børslien	Norway	315.00	14	Did not advance	
15	Andrzej Rzeszutek	Poland	312.75	15	Did not advance	
16	Alexandru Avasiloae	Romania	309.15	16	Did not advance	
17	Adrián Abadía	Spain	308.30	17	Did not advance	
18	Matej Nevešćanin	Croatia	306.80	18	Did not advance	
19	David Ekdahl	Sweden	306.65	19	Did not advance	
20	Kasper Lesiak	Poland	297.20	20	Did not advance	
21	Dariush Lotfi	Austria	295.15	21	Did not advance	
22	Fabian Stepinski	Switzerland	291.70	22	Did not advance	
23	Nikolaj Schaller	Austria	281.60	23	Did not advance	
24	Elias Petersen	Sweden	272.20	24	Did not advance	
25	Tornike Onikashvili	Georgia	265.75	25	Did not advance	
26	Theofilos Afthinos	Greece	254.40	26	Did not advance	
27	Athanasios Tsirikos	Greece	249.40	27	Did not advance	
28	Martynas Lisauskas	Lithuania	245.30	28	Did not advance	
29	Josef Hugo Šorejs	Czech Republic	245.25	29	Did not advance	
30	Irakli Sakandelidze	Georgia	243.90	30	Did not advance	
31	Nikola Paraušić	Serbia	221.70	31	Did not advance	
