= Taekwondo at the 2023 European Games – Men's 54 kg =

Taekwondo competition

Men's 54 kg at the 2023 European Games
- Venue: Krynica-Zdrój Arena
- Date: 23 June
- Competitors: 15 from 15 nations

Medalists
gold medal	Hugo Arillo	Spain
silver medal	Sayyad Dadashov	Azerbaijan
bronze medal	Andrea Conti	Italy
bronze medal	Konstantinos Dimitropolous	Greece

The men's 54 kg competition in taekwondo at the 2023 European Games took place on 23 June at the Krynica-Zdrój Arena.

== Schedule ==
All times are Central European Summer Time (UTC+2).

Date	Time	Event
Friday, 23 June 2023	09:36	Round of 16
Friday, 23 June 2023	14:12	Quarterfinals
Friday, 23 June 2023	15:48	Semifinals
Friday, 23 June 2023	16:36	Repechage
Friday, 23 June 2023	19:12	Bronze medal bouts
Friday, 23 June 2023	20:12	Final

== Results ==
Round of 16
Ebrahim Marwan (SWE)	9	3
Görkem Polat (TUR)	4	2
Khalid Abdel Halim (GER)	4	5
Sayyad Dadashov (AZE)	8	6
Lyubomir Bogdanov (BUL)	12	13
Bartłomiej Wieczorek (POL)	0	0
Konstantinos Dimitropolous (GRE)	8	6	1
Hugo Arillo (ESP)	10^{P}	0	8
Zack Sarsoza (GBR)	3	0
Milan Molle (NED)	12	12
Domen Molj (SLO)	6	6
Andrea Conti (ITA)	13	10
Vadim Dmitrov (MDA)	5	10
Tom Pashcovsky (ISR)	17	7^{P}

Quarterfinals
Josip Teskera (CRO)	3	7
Ebrahim Marwan (SWE)	6	9
Sayyad Dadashov (AZE)	10	10
Lyubomir Bogdanov (BUL)	5	5
Hugo Arillo (ESP)	7	12
Milan Molle (NED)	2	9
Andrea Conti (ITA)	13	13
Tom Pashcovsky (ISR)	8	11

Semifinals
Ebrahim Marwan (SWE)	2	3
Sayyad Dadashov (AZE)	8	7
Hugo Arillo (ESP)	8	7	8
Andrea Conti (ITA)	8	0	4

Final
Sayyad Dadashov (AZE)	0	11	7
Hugo Arillo (ESP)	3	3	9

Repechage

Repechage
Lyubomir Bogdanov (BUL)	7	2	10
Khalid Abdel Halim (GER)	3	4	9
Konstantinos Dimitropolous (GRE)	10	18
Milan Molle (NED)	10	13

Bronze medal bout
Andrea Conti (ITA)	5	3
Lyubomir Bogdanov (BUL)	2	1
Konstantinos Dimitropolous (GRE)	6	8	7
Ebrahim Marwan (SWE)	1	9	4
