= 2023 European Diving Championships – Women's 1 metre springboard =

Women's 1 metre springboard at the 2023 European Diving Championships
- Venue: Rzeszów Diving Arena
- Date: 28 June
- Competitors: 25 from 16 nations
- Winning points: 273.25

Medalists
gold medal	Michelle Heimberg	Switzerland
silver medal	Emilia Nilsson Garip	Sweden
bronze medal	Grace Reid	Great Britain

The women's 1 metre springboard event at the 2023 European Diving Championships was held on 28 June 2023.

== Results ==
The preliminary round was started at 10:00. The final was held at 16:00.

Green denotes finalists

Rank	Diver	Nation	Preliminary		Final	
Rank	Diver	Nation	Points	Rank	Points	Rank
1st place, gold medalist(s)	Michelle Heimberg	Switzerland	253.60	4	273.25	1
2nd place, silver medalist(s)	Emilia Nilsson Garip	Sweden	274.35	1	273.10	2
3rd place, bronze medalist(s)	Grace Reid	Great Britain	254.50	3	266.90	3
4	Chiara Pellacani	Italy	255.40	2	264.35	4
5	Lena Hentschel	Germany	253.35	5	260.75	5
6	Elena Bertocchi	Italy	247.70	6	250.65	6
7	Jette Müller	Germany	241.20	8	248.80	7
8	Kaja Skrzek	Poland	242.30	7	247.70	8
9	Anna Pysmenska	Ukraine	228.25	10	236.80	9
10	Lauren Hallaselkä	Finland	223.95	12	233.50	10
11	Helle Tuxen	Norway	235.45	9	232.65	11
12	Caroline Kupka	Norway	225.10	11	223.90	12
13	Aleksandra Błażowska	Poland	222.85	13	Did not advance	
14	Rocío Velázquez	Spain	215.55	14	Did not advance	
15	Madeline Coquoz	Switzerland	212.60	15	Did not advance	
16	Holly Prasanto	Great Britain	208.80	16	Did not advance	
17	Elna Widerström	Sweden	204.30	17	Did not advance	
18	Džeja Delanija Patrika	Latvia	201.65	18	Did not advance	
19	Patrícia Kun	Hungary	201.50	19	Did not advance	
20	Vita Šlajūtė	Lithuania	197.50	20	Did not advance	
21	Amelie Foerster	Romania	191.05	21	Did not advance	
22	Clare Cryan	Ireland	187.85	22	Did not advance	
23	Estilla Mosena	Hungary	185.05	23	Did not advance	
24	Tereza Jelínková	Czech Republic	167.60	24	Did not advance	
25	Urtė Valeišaitė	Lithuania	159.05	25	Did not advance	
