= Diving at the 2016 European Aquatics Championships – Mixed 3 m springboard synchro =

Mixed 3 m springboard synchro at the 2016 European Aquatics Championships
- Dates: 11 May
- Competitors: 14 from 8 nations
- Teams: 8
- Winning points: 321.06

Medalists
gold medal	Grace Reid; Tom Daley	Great Britain
silver medal	Tania Cagnotto; Maicol Verzotto	Italy
bronze medal	Nadezhda Bazhina; Nikita Shleikher	Russia

The Mixed 3 m springboard synchro competition of the 2016 European Aquatics Championships was held on 11 May 2016.

== Results ==
The final was held at 20:00.

Rank	Divers	Nation	
Rank	Divers	Nation	Points
1st place, gold medalist(s)	Grace Reid; Tom Daley	Great Britain	321.06
2nd place, silver medalist(s)	Tania Cagnotto; Maicol Verzotto	Italy	308.70
3rd place, bronze medalist(s)	Nadezhda Bazhina; Nikita Shleikher	Russia	305.28
4	Christina Wassen; Timo Barthel	Germany	291.06
5	Anastasiia Nedobiga; Oleg Kolodiy	Ukraine	289.14
6	Daniella Nero; Vinko Paradzik	Sweden	265.11
7	Jessica Favre; Guillaume Dutoit	Switzerland	255.60
8	Rocío Velázquez; Alberto Arévalo	Spain	245.16
