= Florian Unruh =

German archer (born 1993)

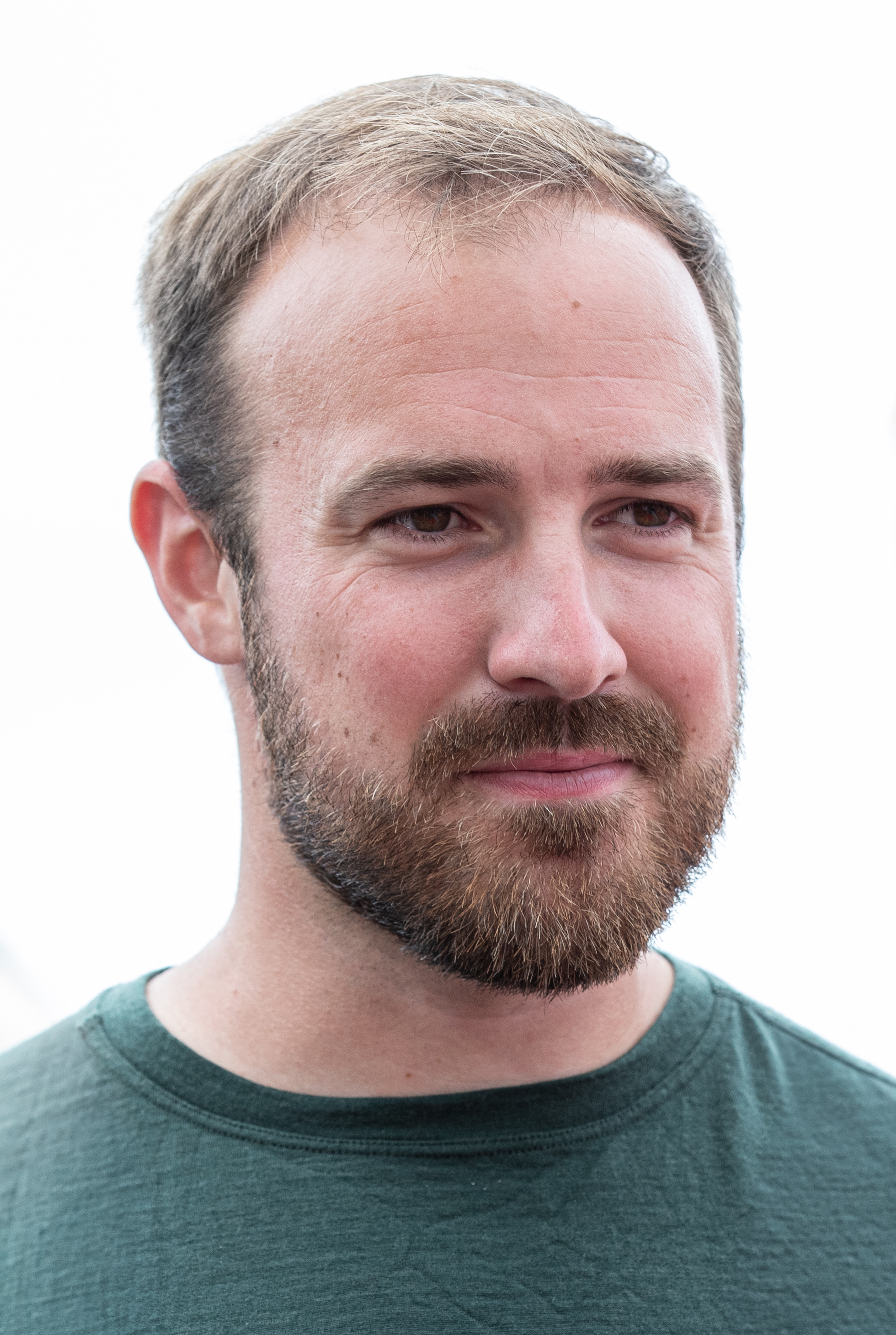
- Unruh in 2025

Personal information
- Born: Florian Kahllund; 7 June 1993 (age 33) Rendsburg, Germany
- Height: 185 cm (6 ft 1 in)
- Weight: 75 kg (165 lb)

Sport
- Sport: Archery
Medal record
Men's recurve archery
Representing Germany
Olympic Games
Silver medal – second place	2024 Paris	Mixed team
World Championships
Silver medal – second place	2017 Mexico	Mixed team
Silver medal – second place	2023 Berlin	Mixed team
World Field Championships
Gold medal – first place	2022 Yankton	Individual
European Games
Gold medal – first place	2023 Kraków-Małopolska	Individual
Bronze medal – third place	2023 Kraków-Małopolska	Mixed team
European Championships
Gold medal – first place	2014 Echmiadzin	Individual
Gold medal – first place	2024 Essen	Mixed team
Silver medal – second place	2014 Echmiadzin	Team
Silver medal – second place	2022 Munich	Individual
Silver medal – second place	2022 Munich	Mixed team

Florian Unruh (born 7 June 1993, né Kahllund) is a German athlete who competes in recurve archery.

Kahllund first competed internationally in 2013, and in 2014 won the individual title at the European Championships in Echmiadzin and qualified for the World Cup Final, winning the third stage of the individual competition in Antalya.

He won the silver medal in the men's individual recurve event at the 2022 European Archery Championships held in Munich, Germany. He also won the silver medal in the mixed team recurve event.

Unruh won the silver medal in the team event at the 2024 Olympics with his partner Michelle Kroppen.

== Personal life ==
He is married to fellow archer Lisa Unruh and adopted her surname.
