= Emilia Nilsson Garip =

Swedish diver (born 2003)

Personal information
- Full name: Emilia Aysun Ingegerd Nilsson Garip
- Nationality: Swedish
- Born: 21 April 2003 (age 23) Malmö, Sweden
- Education: University of Utah (2023–present)

Sport
- Sport: Diving
- Club: Malmö Kappsimningsklubb
- Coached by: Pär Berg, Chris Rye
Medal record
Women's diving
Representing Sweden
European Games
Silver medal – second place	2023 Kraków-Małopolska	1 m springboard
Silver medal – second place	2023 Kraków-Małopolska	3 m springboard
Bronze medal – third place	2023 Kraków-Małopolska	3 m mixed synchro
European Championships
Silver medal – second place	2024 Belgrade	Mixed 3 m springboard synchro
Bronze medal – third place	2022 Rome	3 m synchro
Bronze medal – third place	2024 Belgrade	1 m springboard
European Diving Championships
Silver medal – second place	2023 Rzeszów	1 m springboard
Silver medal – second place	2023 Rzeszów	3 m springboard
Bronze medal – third place	2023 Rzeszów	3 m mixed synchro
World Junior Championships
Bronze medal – third place	2018 Kyiv	3m Springboard B
Bronze medal – third place	2021 Kyiv	1m Springboard A
Bronze medal – third place	2021 Kyiv	Team event
European Junior Championships
Bronze medal – third place	2018 Helsinki	1m Springboard B
Bronze medal – third place	2019 Kazan	3m Synchronised A/B
Gold medal – first place	2021 Rijeka	1m Springboard A
Gold medal – first place	2021 Rijeka	3m Springboard A

Emilia Nilsson Garip (born 21 April 2003) is a Swedish diver. She competed in the women's 1 metre springboard event at the 2019 World Aquatics Championships. She finished in 14th place in the preliminary round. In the women's 3 metre springboard event she finished in 47th place in the preliminary round. In 2021, Nilsson Garip won two gold medals at the Swedish National Championships. In 2021, she finished in fifth place at the European Championships, and she also won two gold medals at the Junior European Swimming Championships.

Emilia's older sister, Jasmine Nilsson Garip (born 2000), has also competed in diving for the same club: Malmö KK. Jasmine finished 10th in the A-Girls 1m springboard event at the 2016 Swedish Youth Championships.

She started attending the University of Utah in Salt Lake City in 2023, and dives for the Utah Utes.

== Diving achievements ==
Competition	Event	2019	2020	2021	2022	2023	2024
International representing Sweden
FINA World Aquatics Championships	1m Springboard	14th			11th	37th	TBD
FINA World Aquatics Championships	3m Springboard	47th			11th	8th	
FINA World Aquatics Championships	3m Synchro					11th	
FINA World Aquatics Championships	3m Mixed Synchro					5th	TBD
European Championships & European Diving Championships	1m Springboard				5th	(silver)	
European Championships & European Diving Championships	3m Springboard				6th	(silver)	
European Championships & European Diving Championships	3m Synchro				(bronze)	5th	
European Championships & European Diving Championships	3m Mixed Synchro				4th	(bronze)	
FINA Diving World Cup	3m Springboard			25th			
