= Grace Reid =

Scottish diver (born 1996)

Grace Reid OLY
Personal information
- Full name: Grace Elizabeth Reid
- Born: 9 May 1996 (age 30) Edinburgh, Scotland
- Height: 1.69 m (5 ft 7 in)

Sport
- Country: Great Britain; Scotland
- Event: Diving
- Club: Dive London
- Coached by: Jane Figueiredo
Medal record
Women's diving
Representing Great Britain
World Championships
Silver medal – second place	2017 Budapest	3 m mixed synchro
Silver medal – second place	2024 Doha	1 m springboard
Bronze medal – third place	2022 Budapest	3 m mixed synchro
European Games
Silver medal – second place	2023 Kraków-Małopolska	3 m mixed synchro
Bronze medal – third place	2023 Kraków-Małopolska	1 m springboard
European Championships
Gold medal – first place	2016 London	3 m mixed synchro
Gold medal – first place	2018 Glasgow	3 m springboard
Silver medal – second place	2018 Glasgow	3 m mixed synchro
Silver medal – second place	2022 Rome	3 m mixed synchro
Bronze medal – third place	2016 London	3 m springboard
Bronze medal – third place	2022 Rome	Team event
European Diving Championships
Silver medal – second place	2023 Rzeszów	3 m mixed synchro
Bronze medal – third place	2023 Rzeszów	1 m springboard
FINA Diving World Cup
Bronze medal – third place	2018 Wuhan	3 m mixed synchro
Representing Scotland
Commonwealth Games
Gold medal – first place	2018 Gold Coast	1 m springboard
Gold medal – first place	2022 Birmingham	3 m mixed synchro

Grace Elizabeth Reid (born 9 May 1996) is a Scottish former diver who represented Scotland and Great Britain, and specialising in 1 metre and 3 metre springboard disciplines. She is a world championship silver medallist in the 1 metre springboard, twice a world medallist in the 3 metre mixed synchronised 3 metre springboard discipline, a double gold medallist at both the European Championships and the Commonwealth Games (once each in individual and springboard events in both cases) as well as a multiple minor medallist in both those events, the European Games and the FINA Diving World Cup. Domestically, Reid is a three-time national champion.

== Career ==
At the 2010 Commonwealth Games, representing Scotland she competed in the Women's 3 metre springboard, aged only 14. At the 2014 Commonwealth Games, she competed in the Women's 1 metre springboard and Women's 3 metre springboard events. At her third Games, the 2018 Commonwealth Games held at Gold Coast, Reid won gold in the 1 metre springboard the first Scottish female diver to win a medal at the games. Four years later in Birmingham, paired with James Heatly she won her second Commonwealth title in the mixed 3 metre synchronised springboard event, came 4th in the women's 1 metre springboard event and 8th in the women's 3 metre springboard event.

Reid made her debut for Great Britain at the 2015 European Diving Championships. At the 2016 European Aquatics Championships she won Gold in the Mixed 3 m springboard synchro with partner Tom Daley. She also won Bronze in the Women's 3 m springboard becoming the first Scot to win an individual European Championships diving medal for Great Britain since 1954.

Following Daley's decision to withdraw from all 2018 diving competitions, Reid partnered with Ross Haslam and the pair won the bronze medal at the 2018 FINA Diving World Cup, followed by silver at the 2018 European Championships.

Reid announced her retirement from diving in October 2025.

== Diving achievements ==
Competition	Event	2010	2011	2012	2013	2014	2015	2016	2017	2018	2019	2020	2021	2022	2023	2024
International representing Great Britain
Olympic Games	3m Springboard							8th				19th				10th
Olympic Games	3m Synchro											6th				
FINA World Aquatics Championships	1m Springboard													6th		2nd place, silver medalist(s)
FINA World Aquatics Championships	3m Springboard								4th		8th			8th		8th
FINA World Aquatics Championships	3m Synchro								5th		5th					
FINA World Aquatics Championships	3m Mixed Synchro								2nd place, silver medalist(s)		4th			3rd place, bronze medalist(s)		4th
FINA Diving World Cup	3m Springboard							17th		14th					12th	
FINA Diving World Cup	3m Synchro												6th			
FINA Diving World Cup	3m Mixed Synchro									3rd place, bronze medalist(s)						
FINA Diving World Cup	Mixed 3m & 10m Team														3rd place, bronze medalist(s)	
European Aquatics Championships / European Diving Championships	1m Springboard						5th	7th							3rd place, bronze medalist(s)	
European Aquatics Championships / European Diving Championships	3m Springboard						11th	3rd place, bronze medalist(s)		1st place, gold medalist(s)				8th	5th	
European Aquatics Championships / European Diving Championships	3m Synchro								4th	4th						
European Aquatics Championships / European Diving Championships	3m Mixed Synchro							1st place, gold medalist(s)		2nd place, silver medalist(s)				2nd place, silver medalist(s)	2nd place, silver medalist(s)	
European Aquatics Championships / European Diving Championships	Team													3rd place, bronze medalist(s)		
International representing Scotland
Commonwealth Games	1m Springboard					5th				1st place, gold medalist(s)				4th		
Commonwealth Games	3m Springboard	6th				9th				9th				8th		
Commonwealth Games	3m Mixed Synchro													1st place, gold medalist(s)		
Domestic
British Championships	1m Springboard					4th	2nd place, silver medalist(s)							2nd place, silver medalist(s)	3rd place, bronze medalist(s)	
British Championships	3m Springboard			4th	1st place, gold medalist(s)	6th	6th	1st place, gold medalist(s)			2nd place, silver medalist(s)	2nd place, silver medalist(s)		2nd place, silver medalist(s)	3rd place, bronze medalist(s)	
British Championships	3m Synchro	(gold)		2nd place, silver medalist(s)							2nd place, silver medalist(s)					
British National Diving Cup	1m Springboard			2nd place, silver medalist(s)		2nd place, silver medalist(s)		1st place, gold medalist(s)	2nd place, silver medalist(s)		2nd place, silver medalist(s)			1st place, gold medalist(s)		
British National Diving Cup	3m Springboard			5th		5th		4th	2nd place, silver medalist(s)		8th			1st place, gold medalist(s)		
British National Diving Cup	3m Synchro								1st place, gold medalist(s)		1st place, gold medalist(s)			3rd place, bronze medalist(s)		
British National Diving Cup	3m Mixed Sunchro								1st place, gold medalist(s)							
