= Penny Healey =

British archer (born 2005)

Personal information
- Born: 7 March 2005 (age 21) Telford, United Kingdom

Sport
- Country: United Kingdom
- Sport: Archery
- Event: Recurve

Achievements and titles
- Highest world ranking: 1st (2023)
Medal record
Women's recurve archery
Representing Great Britain
European Games
Gold medal – first place	2023 Kraków-Małopolska	Individual
Gold medal – first place	2023 Kraków-Małopolska	Team
World Cup
Gold medal – first place	2023 Antalya	Individual
Gold medal – first place	2025 Central Florida	Individual
World Youth Championships
Silver medal – second place	2025 Winnipeg	Mixed Team

Penny Healey (born 7 March 2005) is a British archer competing in women's recurve events.

== Career ==
She won two gold medals at the 2023 European Games in Kraków, Poland: one in the women's recurve individual event and a second in the women's recurve team event.

In the 2023 season, Healey became the number one women's recurve archer in the world following an individual gold medal at Stage 1 of the 2023 Archery World Cup in Antalya, and her success at the 2023 European Games. She was a nominee for BBC Young Sports Personality of the Year 2023.

She qualified to represent Great Britain at the 2024 Summer Olympics. In the individual she suffered a first round defeat, being knocked out by Jeon Hun-young. In the team event, alongside teammates Megan Havers and Bryony Pitman, they were knocked out by Germany in the round of 16.
