= Diving at the 2018 European Aquatics Championships – Women's 10 m platform =

Women's 10 m platform at the 2018 European Aquatics Championships
- Venue: Royal Commonwealth Pool
- Dates: 8 August
- Competitors: 15 from 10 nations
- Winning points: 319.10

Medalists
gold medal	Celine van Duijn	Netherlands
silver medal	Noemi Batki	Italy
bronze medal	Maria Kurjo	Germany

The Women's 10 m platform competition of the 2018 European Aquatics Championships was held on 8 August 2018.

== Results ==
The preliminary round was started on at 09:30. The final was held at 14:40.

Green denotes finalists

Rank	Diver	Nationality	Preliminary		Final	
Rank	Diver	Nationality	Points	Rank	Points	Rank
1st place, gold medalist(s)	Celine van Duijn	Netherlands	289.65	1	319.10	1
2nd place, silver medalist(s)	Noemi Batki	Italy	279.40	5	315.00	2
3rd place, bronze medalist(s)	Maria Kurjo	Germany	282.35	3	308.15	3
4	Sofiia Lyskun	Ukraine	279.60	4	306.60	4
5	Lois Toulson	Great Britain	284.10	2	292.20	5
6	Robyn Birch	Great Britain	250.70	8	290.60	6
7	Tanya Watson	Ireland	233.15	11	276.85	7
8	Elena Wassen	Germany	264.50	6	270.40	8
9	Ellen Ek	Sweden	260.40	7	264.70	9
10	Anne Tuxen	Norway	222.45	12	215.00	10
11	Isabelle Svantesson	Sweden	241.60	10	199.85	11
12	Helle Tuxen	Norway	245.75	9	161.90	12
13	Genevieve Green	Lithuania	209.90	13	did not advance	
14	Yulia Timoshinina	Russia	204.80	14	did not advance	
15	Anna Chuinyshena	Russia	180.00	15	did not advance	
