= 2017 European Diving Championships – Women's 10 metre platform =

== Results ==
Green denotes finalists

| Rank | Diver | Nationality | Preliminary | | Final | |
| Rank | Diver | Nationality | Points | Rank | Points | Rank |
|---|---|---|---|---|---|---|
| 1st place, gold medalist(s) | Lois Toulson | Great Britain | 251.30 | 9 | 330.75 | 1 |
| 2nd place, silver medalist(s) | Anna Chuinyshena | Russia | 231.35 | 12 | 326.90 | 2 |
| 3rd place, bronze medalist(s) | Iuliia Timoshinina | Russia | 318.35 | 1 | 313.30 | 3 |
| 4 | Christina Wassen | Germany | 289.40 | 4 | 295.90 | 4 |
| 5 | Sofiia Lyskun | Ukraine | 305.15 | 2 | 293.25 | 5 |
| 6 | Maria Kurjo | Germany | 296.50 | 3 | 291.45 | 6 |
| 7 | Valeriia Liulko | Ukraine | 267.80 | 5 | 288.30 | 7 |
| 8 | Laura Marino | France | 256.30 | 8 | 284.35 | 8 |
| 9 | Robyn Birch | Great Britain | 246.50 | 10 | 281.10 | 9 |
| 10 | Celine Van Duijn | Netherlands | 267.50 | 6 | 280.65 | 10 |
| 11 | Villo Gyongyver Kormos | Hungary | 257.55 | 7 | 277.90 | 11 |
| 12 | Ellen Ek | Sweden | 232.10 | 11 | 240.20 | 12 |
| 13 | Maissam Naji | France | 174.95 | 13 | | |
