= 2023 European Diving Championships – Women's 10 metre platform =

Women's 10 metre platform at the 2023 European Diving Championships
- Venue: Rzeszów Diving Arena
- Date: 23 June
- Competitors: 18 from 13 nations
- Winning points: 331.60

Medalists
gold medal	Eden Cheng	Great Britain
silver medal	Christina Wassen	Germany
bronze medal	Sarah Jodoin Di Maria	Italy

Women's 10 metre platform event at the 2023 European Diving Championships was held on 23 June 2023.

The event was won by Great Britain's Eden Cheng. By winning she secured an Olympic quota in the event for Great Britain.

== Results ==
The preliminary round was started at 10:00. The final was held at 20:00.

Green denotes finalists

Rank	Diver	Nationality	Preliminary		Final	
Rank	Diver	Nationality	Points	Rank	Points	Rank
1st place, gold medalist(s)	Eden Cheng	Great Britain	299.35	1	331.60	1
2nd place, silver medalist(s)	Christina Wassen	Germany	285.75	3	330.95	2
3rd place, bronze medalist(s)	Sarah Jodoin Di Maria	Italy	299.00	2	320.10	3
4	Elena Wassen	Germany	266.00	8	317.30	4
5	Robyn Birch	Great Britain	277.55	4	289.25	5
6	Ciara McGing	Ireland	254.65	11	280.10	6
7	Else Praasterink	Netherlands	270.85	6	278.15	7
8	Nicoleta Muscalu	Romania	255.60	10	277.05	8
9	Jade Gillet	France	276.30	5	256.15	9
10	Maia Biginelli	Italy	258.65	9	245.40	10
11	Valeria Antolino	Spain	258.65	8	223.00	11
12	Helle Tuxen	Norway	247.40	12	217.80	12
13	Ana Carvajal	Spain	230.85	13	Did not advance	
14	Amanda Lundin	Sweden	221.35	14	Did not advance	
15	Ioana Cârcu	Romania	207.90	15	Did not advance	
16	Stavroula Chalemou	Greece	206.15	16	Did not advance	
17	Džeja Delanija Patrika	Latvia	200.10	17	Did not advance	
18	Alisa Zakaryan	Armenia	123.75	18	Did not advance	
