= Diving at the 2022 European Aquatics Championships – Women's 10 m platform =

Women's 10 m platform at the 2022 European Aquatics Championships
- Venue: Foro Italico
- Dates: 17 August
- Competitors: 16 from 11 nations
- Winning points: 333.60

Medalists
| gold medal | Andrea Spendolini-Sirieix | Great Britain |
| silver medal | Sofiia Lyskun | Ukraine |
| bronze medal | Christina Wassen | Germany |

The Women's 10 m platform competition of the 2022 European Aquatics Championships will be held on 17 August 2022.

== Results ==
The preliminary round was started at 12:00. The final was held at 14:57.

Green denotes finalists

| Rank | Diver | Nationality | Preliminary | | Final | |
| Rank | Diver | Nationality | Points | Rank | Points | Rank |
|---|---|---|---|---|---|---|
| 1st place, gold medalist(s) | Andrea Spendolini-Sirieix | Great Britain | 318.70 | 1 | 333.60 | 1 |
| 2nd place, silver medalist(s) | Sofiia Lyskun | Ukraine | 309.40 | 2 | 329.80 | 2 |
| 3rd place, bronze medalist(s) | Christina Wassen | Germany | 253.75 | 10 | 314.10 | 3 |
| 4 | Pauline Pfeif | Germany | 266.55 | 8 | 304.40 | 4 |
| 5 | Sarah Jodoin di Maria | Italy | 296.25 | 3 | 301.40 | 5 |
| 6 | Lois Toulson | Great Britain | 293.00 | 4 | 295.70 | 6 |
| 7 | Tanya Watson | Ireland | 269.90 | 7 | 286.55 | 7 |
| 8 | Else Praasterink | Netherlands | 272.60 | 6 | 282.60 | 8 |
| 9 | Ciara McGing | Ireland | 277.95 | 5 | 279.30 | 9 |
| 10 | Maia Biginelli | Italy | 250.80 | 11 | 260.80 | 10 |
| 11 | Valeria Antolino | Spain | 254.65 | 9 | 260.60 | 11 |
| 12 | Nicoleta Muscalu | Romania | 235.20 | 12 | 232.20 | 12 |
| 13 | Helle Tuxen | Norway | 234.10 | 13 | did not advance | |
| 14 | Jade Gillet | France | 226.85 | 14 | did not advance | |
| 15 | Elma Lund | Norway | 193.55 | 15 | did not advance | |
| 16 | Alisa Zakaryan | Armenia | 147.20 | 16 | did not advance | |
