= Diving at the 2018 European Aquatics Championships – Women's 10 m synchro platform =

Women's 10 m synchro platform at the 2018 European Aquatics Championships
- Venue: Royal Commonwealth Pool
- Dates: 7 August
- Competitors: 14 from 7 nations
- Teams: 7
- Winning points: 289.74

Medalists
| gold medal | Eden Cheng; Lois Toulson | Great Britain |
| silver medal | Ekaterina Beliaeva; Yulia Timoshinina | Russia |
| bronze medal | Maria Kurjo; Elena Wassen | Germany |

The Women's 10 m synchro platform competition of the 2018 European Aquatics Championships was held on 7 August 2018 at the Royal Commonwealth Pool in Edinburgh.

== Results ==
The final was started at 13:30.

| Rank | Nation | Divers | |
| Rank | Nation | Divers | Points |
|---|---|---|---|
| 1st place, gold medalist(s) | Great Britain | Eden Cheng; Lois Toulson | 289.74 |
| 2nd place, silver medalist(s) | Russia | Ekaterina Beliaeva; Yulia Timoshinina | 288.60 |
| 3rd place, bronze medalist(s) | Germany | Maria Kurjo; Elena Wassen | 284.64 |
| 4 | Italy | Noemi Batki; Chiara Pellacani | 276.60 |
| 5 | Ukraine | Valeriia Liulko; Sofiia Lyskun | 263.28 |
| 6 | Norway | Anne Tuxen; Helle Tuxen | 240.96 |
| 7 | Sweden | Ellen Ek; Isabelle Svantesson | 214.65 |
