= Germany at the 2023 European Games =

- IOC code: GER
- NOC: German Olympic Sports Confederation
- Website: www.dosb.de

in Kraków and Małopolska, Poland 21 June – 2 July 2023
- Competitors: 333
- Flag bearers (opening): Max Rendschmidt; Isabel Kattner
- Flag bearer (closing): Ricarda Funk
- Medals Ranked 4th: Gold 20 Silver 16 Bronze 27 Total 63

European Games appearances (overview)
- 2015; 2019; 2023; 2027

Germany competed at the 2023 European Games, in Kraków and Małopolska, Poland, from 21 June to 2 July 2023.

== Medallists ==
Medal	Name	Sport	Event	Date
Gold	Reem Khamis	Karate	Women's kumite 61 kg	23 June
Gold	Johanna Kneer	Karate	Women's kumite +68 kg	23 June
Gold	Kristin Pudenz	Athletics	Women's discus throw	23 June
Gold	Christian Reitz; Michael Schwald; Robin Walter	Shooting	Men's team 10 metre air pistol	24 June
Gold	Josefin Eder; Sandra Reitz; Doreen Vennekamp	Shooting	Women's team 10 metre air pistol	24 June
Gold	Carolina Krafzik	Athletics	Women's 400 metres hurdles	24 June
Gold	Julian Wagner; Marvin Schulte; Joshua Hartmann; Yannick Wolf	Athletics	Men's 4 × 100 metres relay	24 June
Gold	Moritz Wesemann	Diving	Men's 3 metre springboard	24 June
Gold	Julian Weber	Athletics	Men's javelin throw	25 June
Gold	Dang Qiu; Nina Mittelham	Table tennis	Mixed doubles	26 June
Gold	Christina Wassen; Elena Wassen	Diving	Women's 10 metre platform synchro	27 June
Gold	Timo Barthel	Diving	Men's 10 metre platform	27 June
Gold	Florian Unruh	Archery	Men's individual recurve	29 June
Gold	Franz Anton; Sideris Tasiadis; Timo Trummer	Canoe slalom	Men's team C1	30 June
Gold	Ricarda Funk	Canoe slalom	Women's K1	1 July
Gold	Janine Kohlmann; Rebecca Langrehr; Annika Zillekens	Modern pentathlon	Women's team	1 July
Gold	Timo Boll; Patrick Franziska; Dimitrij Ovtcharov; Dang Qiu	Table tennis	Men's team	1 July
Gold	Al Amin Rmadan	Kickboxing	Men's light contact 79 kg	2 July
Gold	Elena Lilik	Canoe slalom	Women's C1	2 July
Gold	Sandro Peters	Kickboxing	Men's pointfighting 84 kg	2 July
Silver	Robin Walter	Shooting	Men's 10 metre air pistol	22 June
Silver	Felix Frank; Martin Hiller	Canoe sprint	Men's K-2 500 metres	22 June
Silver	Paulina Paszek; Jule Hake; Katinka Hofmann; Lena Röhlings	Canoe sprint	Women's K-4 500 metres	22 June
Silver	Kim Lea Müller	Cycling	Women's park	22 June
Silver	Klara Bleyer; Marlene Bojer; Maria Denisov; Solene Guisard; Daria Martens; Susana Rovner; Daria Tonn; Michelle Zimmer; Amelie Blumenthal Haz; Frithjof Seidel	Artistic swimming	Free combination routine	23 June
Silver	Maximilian Ulbrich	Shooting	Men's 10 metre air rifle	23 June
Silver	Yemisi Ogunleye	Athletics	Women's shot put	23 June
Silver	Christina Wassen	Diving	Women's 10 metre platform	23 June
Silver	Alexander Lube; Elena Wassen	Diving	Mixed 10 metre platform synchro	24 June
Silver	Lena Hentschel; Jana Rother	Diving	Women's 3 metre springboard synchro	26 June
Silver	Christian Reitz	Shooting	Men's 25 metre rapid fire pistol	30 June
Silver	Han Ying; Nina Mittelham; Shan Xiaona; Sabine Winter	Table tennis	Women's team	1 July
Silver	Jano Rübo; Martin Matijass; Erik Abramov; Losseni Koné; Seija Ballhaus; Pauline Starke; Miriam Butkereit; Renee Lucht	Judo	Mixed team	1 July
Silver	Anis Triqui	Kickboxing	Men's light contact 63 kg	2 July
Silver	Ricarda Funk	Canoe slalom	Women's kayak cross	2 July
Silver	Aline Sodjinou	Kickboxing	Women's full contact 70 kg	2 July
Bronze	Germany women's national beach handball team: Joelle Arno; Ryleene Teodoro; Michaell Schäfer; Belen Gettwart; Paula Reips; Isabel Kattner; Jana Epple; Kristina Krecken; Nele Kurzke; Carolin Hübner; Julia Drachsler; Janne Woch	Beach handball	Women's tournament	22 June
Bronze	Süheda Nur Çelik	Taekwondo	Women's finweight	23 June
Bronze	Supharada Kisskalt	Taekwondo	Women's featherweight	23 June
Bronze	Jacob Schopf; Lena Röhlings	Canoe sprint	Mixed K-2 200 metres	24 June
Bronze	Nico Pickert; Annika Loske	Canoe sprint	Mixed C-2 200 metres	24 June
Bronze	Florian Unruh; Michelle Kroppen	Archery	Mixed team recurve	25 June
Bronze	Nadine Messerschmidt	Shooting	Women's skeet	25 June
Bronze	none (Note: Athletics at the 2023 European Games were contested in the 2023 European Athletics Team Championships and therefore as in the latter competition, the team medals for overall standing in First Division were given to the nations as a team, but not the individual athletes.)	Athletics	First Division	25 June
Bronze	Doreen Vennekamp	Shooting	Women's 25 metre pistol	26 June
Bronze	Alexandra Ehler	Fencing	Women's épée	26 June
Bronze	Laurenz Rieger	Fencing	Men's foil	26 June
Bronze	Sandra Reitz; Michelle Skeries; Doreen Vennekamp	Shooting	Women's team 25 metre pistol	28 June
Bronze	Leandra Behr; Aliya Dhuique-Hein; Leonie Ebert; Anne Sauer	Fencing	Women's team foil	28 June
Bronze	Raoul Bonah; Lorenz Kempf; Frederic Kindler; Matyas Szabo	Fencing	Men's team sabre	28 June
Bronze	Jolyn Beer; Anna Janssen; Lisa Müller	Shooting	Women's team 50 metre rifle three positions	29 June
Bronze	Emily Apel; Ricarda Funk; Elena Lilik	Canoe slalom	Women's team K1	29 June
Bronze	Alexander Kahl; Luis Klein; Laurenz Rieger	Fencing	Men's team foil	29 June
Bronze	Nele Bayn; Andrea Herzog; Elena Lilik	Canoe slalom	Women's team C1	30 June
Bronze	Selina Freitag	Ski jumping	Women's individual large hill	30 June
Bronze	Irina Schönberger	Boxing	Women's middleweight	30 June
Bronze	Linda Efler; Isabel Lohau	Badminton	Women's doubles	30 June
Bronze	Nelvie Tiafack	Boxing	Men's super heavyweight	30 June
Bronze	Roland Viczian	Kickboxing	Men's pointfighting 63 kg	1 July
Bronze	Kiara Mager	Kickboxing	Women's pointfighting 60 kg	1 July
Bronze	Michelle Mesmer	Kickboxing	Women's light contact 50 kg	1 July
Bronze	Philipp Raimund	Ski jumping	Men's individual large hill	1 July
Bronze	Sarah Bindrich; Kathrin Murche; Bettina Valdorf	Shooting	Women's team trap	2 July

== Competitors ==
Sport	Men	Women	Total
Archery	2	4	6
Artistic swimming	1	9	10
Athletics	23	23	46
Badminton	3	3	6
Basketball	4	4	8
Beach handball	12	12	24
Boxing	7	5	12
Breaking	0	2	2
Canoeing	17	13	30
Cycling	8	8	16
Diving	5	6	11
Fencing	12	12	24
Judo	6	6	12
Karate	1	4	5
Kickboxing	4	5	9
Modern pentathlon	4	4	8
Muaythai	2	0	2
Padel	2	4	6
Rugby sevens	13	13	26
Shooting	11	12	23
Ski jumping	5	5	10
Sport climbing	4	5	9
Table tennis	4	4	8
Taekwondo	5	7	12
Teqball	2	2	4
Total	157	172	329

== Archery ==
Compound

Athlete	Event	Ranking round		Round of 16	Quarterfinals	Semifinals	Final / BM	
Athlete	Event	Score	Seed	Opposition Score	Opposition Score	Opposition Score	Opposition Score	Rank
Henning Lüpkemann	Men's individual	701	11	Haney (TUR); L 145–149	Did not advance			
Katharina Raab	Women's individual	693	10	Muñoz (ESP); L 143–145	Did not advance			
Katharina Raab; Henning Lüpkemann	Mixed team	1394	9	Poland; W 154–152	Denmark; L 154–158	Did not advance		

Recurve

Athlete	Event	Ranking round		Round of 64	Round of 32	Round of 16	Quarterfinals	Semifinals	Final / BM	
Athlete	Event	Score	Seed	Opposition Score	Opposition Score	Opposition Score	Opposition Score	Opposition Score	Opposition Score	Rank
Florian Unruh	Men's individual	686	2	Bye	Rufer (SUI); W 7–3	Nespoli (ITA); W 6–2	Wijler (NED); W 6–5	Acha (ESP); W 7–1	Alvariño (ESP); W 6–2	1st place, gold medalist(s)
Katharina Bauer	Women's individual	661	7	Bye	Papadopoulou (GRE); L 2–6	Did not advance				
Michelle Kroppen	Women's individual	680	3	Bye	Leśniak (POL); L 5–6	Did not advance				
Charline Schwarz	Women's individual	659	8	Bye	Danailova (BUL); W 6–5	Degn (DEN); L 3–7	Did not advance			
Katharina Bauer; Michelle Kroppen; Charline Schwarz	Women's team	2000	1	—N/a			Poland; W 6–0	France; L 0–6	Italy; L 3–5	4
Michelle Kroppen; Florian Unruh	Mixed team	1366	1	—N/a	Bye	Switzerland; W 6–0	Netherlands; W 6–0	Spain; L 2–6	Moldova; W 5–4	3rd place, bronze medalist(s)

== Artistic swimming ==
Women

Athlete	Event	Qualification		Final	
Athlete	Event	Points	Rank	Points	Rank
Klara Bleyer; Susana Rovner	Duet free	147.7916	10 Q	131.4354	10
Klara Bleyer; Marlene Bojer; Maria Denisov; Solene Guisard; Daria Martens; Susana Rovner; Daria Tonn; Michelle Zimmer; Amelie Blumenthal Haz	Team free	209.7929	6 Q	198.9283	7

Mixed

Athlete	Event	Final	
Athlete	Event	Points	Rank
Frithjof Seidel; Michelle Zimmer	Duet technical	159.3034	7
Frithjof Seidel; Michelle Zimmer	Duet free	119.5750	6
Klara Bleyer; Marlene Bojer; Maria Denisov; Solene Guisard; Daria Martens; Susana Rovner; Daria Tonn; Michelle Zimmer; Amelie Blumenthal Haz; Frithjof Seidel	Free combination routine	163.3205	2nd place, silver medalist(s)

== Athletics ==
Germany is set to compete in the third division of the 2023 European Athletics Team Championships which is going to be held in Chorzów during the Games.

=== European Athletics Team Championships First Division ===
Team	Event		Event points																			Total	Rank
Team	Event		100m	200m	400m	800m	1500m	5000m	110m h*	400m h	3000m SC	4 × 100 m	4 × 400 m**	SP	JT	HT	DT	PV	HJ	TJ	LJ	Total	Rank
Germany	Team Championships First Division	Men	12	10	13	4	2	5	9	0	12	16	11	8	16	13	15	10.5	13	1	6	387.5	3rd place, bronze medalist(s)
Germany	Team Championships First Division	Women	8	3	7	14	14	12	8	16	11	13	11	15	15	11	16	10	12	13	13	387.5	3rd place, bronze medalist(s)

key: h: hurdles; SC; Steeplechase: SP; Shot put: JT: Javelin: HT: Hammer: DT: Discus: PV: Pole vault: HJ: High jump: TJ: Triple Jump: LJ: Long Jump

- Women compete at 100 metre hurdles, rather than 110 metre hurdles.
- 4 x 400 metres is held as a single mixed sex event

=== Individual events at the 2023 European Games ===
As a participant in the Team event, each nation automatically enters one athlete in each of the individual events.

Event	Male Athlete	Score	Rank	Female athlete	Score	Rank
100 m	Robin Ganter	10.28	6	Lisa Mayer	11.36	11
200 m	Robin Ganter	20.89	11	Alexandra Burghardt	23.61	23
400 m	Manuel Sanders	45.24	4	Laura Müller	52.32	16
800 m	Luis Oberbeck	1:47.97	16	Majtie Kolberg	2:00.72	7
1500 m	Amos Bartelsmeyer	3:48.59	33	Hanna Klein	4:12.14	9
5000 m	Florian Bremm	14:14.87	22	Lea Meyer	15:33.75	8
110/100 m h	Manuel Mordi	13.67	9	Monika Zapalska	13.32	19
400m h	Joshua Abuaku	DNF		Carolina Krafzik	54.47	1st place, gold medalist(s)
3000m SC	Frederik Ruppert	8:32.99	5	Pauline Meyer	9:57.84	11
4 × 100 m	Julian Wagner; Marvin Schulte; Joshua Hartmann; Yannick Wolf	38.34	1st place, gold medalist(s)	Lisa Nippgen; Lisa Mayer; Louise Wieland; Jennifer Montag	43.24	4
4 × 400 m (mixed)	—N/a			Manuel Sanders; Elisa Lechleitner; Jean Paul Bredau; Carolina Krafzik	3:14.00	6
Shot put	Xaver Hastenrath	19.14	17	Yemisi Ogunleye	18.89	2nd place, silver medalist(s)
Javelin	Julian Weber	86.26	1st place, gold medalist(s)	Christin Hussong	60.05	5
Hammer	Merlin Hummel	73.99	5	Samantha Borutta	68.97	8
Discus	Henrik Janssen	64.09	4	Kristin Pudenz	66.84 SB	1st place, gold medalist(s)
Pole vault	Gillian Ladwig	5.65	6	Sarah Franziska Vogel	4.40	9
High jump	Tobias Potye	2.26	4	Blessing Enatoh	1.87	10
Triple Jump	Tim Lübbert	14.08	38	Kira Wittmann	13.71	6
Long Jump	Simon Batz	7.52	20	Maryse Luzolo	6.49	7

== Badminton ==
Athletes	Event	Group stage				Round of 16	Quarter-finals	Semi-finals	Final	Rank
Athletes	Event	Opposition Score	Opposition Score	Opposition Score	Rank	Opposition Score	Opposition Score	Opposition Score	Opposition Score	Rank
Kai Schäfer	Men's singles	Louda (CZE); L (12–21, 15–21)	Carraggi (BEL); L (19–21, 21–18, 12–21)	Wraber (AUT); W (21–19, 11–21, 21–13)	3	Did not advance				
Yvonne Li	Women's singles	Azzahra (AZE); L (21–17, 18–21, 17–21)	Golubickaitė (LTU); W (21–13, 21–10)	Ginga (MDA); W (21–11, 21–6)	2 Q	Kjærsfeldt (DEN); L (11–21, 14–21)	Did not advance			
Mark Lamsfuß; Marvin Seidel	Men's doubles	Beketov / Makhnovskiy (UKR); W (21–7, 21–9)	Rusev / Stoynov (BUL); W (21–17, 18–21, 21–8)	Hansson / Z-Bexell (SWE); W (21–16, 21–18)	1 Q	—N/a	Popov / Popov (FRA); L (21–18, 11–21, 10–17 retired)	Did not advance		
Linda Efler; Isabel Lohau	Women's doubles	Sjöö / Sjöö (SWE); W (21–12, 21–14)	Lambert / Tran (FRA); L (16–21, 16–21)	Frost / Ryan (IRL); W (21–17, 21–8)	2 Q	—N/a	Fruergaard / Thygesen (DEN); W (16–21, 23–21, 21–16)	Jille / Seinen (NED); L (14–21, 21–19, 17–21)	Did not advance	3rd place, bronze medalist(s)
Mark Lamsfuß; Isabel Lohau	Mixed doubles	Birker / Hochmeir (AUT); W (21–12, 21–12)	Ellis / Smith (GBR); L (21–16, 17–21, 10–21)	Ivančič / Polanc (SLO); W (21–13, 21–15)	2 Q	—N/a	Christiansen / Bøje (DEN); L (14–21, 13–21	Did not advance		

== Basketball ==
3x3

Team	Event	Group stage				Quarterfinals	Semifinals	Final / BM	
Team	Event	Opposition Score	Opposition Score	Opposition Score	Rank	Opposition Score	Opposition Score	Opposition Score	Rank
Germany men's 3x3	Men's tournament	Poland; W 21–20	Serbia; W 19–16	Estonia; L 18–20	2 Q	Czech Republic; W 22–13	Belgium; L 15–21	Poland; L 18–21	4
Germany women's 3x3	Women's tournament	Greece; W 17–12	Romania; L 13–15	Austria; L 17–20	3	Did not advance			

== Beach handball ==
Summary

Key:

- ET: After extra time
- P – Match decided by penalty-shootout.

Team	Event	Group stage				Quarterfinal	Semifinal	Final / BM	
Team	Event	Opposition Score	Opposition Score	Opposition Score	Rank	Opposition Score	Opposition Score	Opposition Score	Rank
Germany men's	Men's	Croatia; L 0–2	Hungary; L 1–2	Portugal; W 2–1	3 Q	Spain; L 1–2	5th Place Semifinal; Croatia; L 0–2	7th Place Match; Poland; W 2–1	7
Germany women's	Women's	Greece; W 2–0	Portugal; W 2–0	Netherlands; L 0–2	2 Q	Poland; W 2-0	Denmark; L 0–2	Bronze Medal Match; Norway; W 2–0	3rd place, bronze medalist(s)

== Boxing ==
Men

Athlete	Event	Round of 64	Round of 32	Round of 16	Quarterfinals	Semifinals	Final	
Athlete	Event	Opposition Result	Opposition Result	Opposition Result	Opposition Result	Opposition Result	Opposition Result	Rank
Salah Ibrahim Omar	Flyweight	—N/a	Morozov (EST); W 5–0	Macdonald (GBR); L 0–5	Did not advance			
Murat Yildirim	Featherweight	—N/a	Bye	Veres (HUN); L 1–4	Did not advance			
Assan Hansen	Lightweight	—N/a	Khartsyz (UKR); W 4–1	Oumiha (FRA); L 1–4	Did not advance			
Magomed Schachidov	Welterweight	Bye	Akbar (GBR); W 4–1	Petropoulos (GRE); W 5–0	Erdemir (TUR); L 0–5	Did not advance		
Kevin Schumann	Middleweight	—N/a	Allahverdiyev (AZE); L RSC-R3	Did not advance				
Alexander Okafor	Heavyweight	—N/a	Rojku (ALB); W 5–0	Michalek (SVK); W 5–0	Reyes (ESP); L 0–5	Did not advance		
Nelvie Tiafack	Super heavyweight	—N/a	Bertens (NED); W 5–0	Aboudou (FRA); W 4–1	Ghadfa (ESP); W 3–2	Abdullayev (AZE); L 1–4	Did not advance	3rd place, bronze medalist(s)

Women

Athlete	Event	Round of 32	Round of 16	Quarterfinals	Semifinals	Final	
Athlete	Event	Opposition Result	Opposition Result	Opposition Result	Opposition Result	Opposition Result	Rank
Maxi Klötzer	Flyweight	Bye	Rok (POL); L 1–4	Did not advance			
Asya Ari	Featherweight	Nechita (ROU); L 2–3	Did not advance				
Lena Marie Büchner	Lightweight	Beram (CRO); L 0–5	Did not advance				
Stefanie von Berge	Welterweight	Bye	Rygielska (POL); L 1–4	Did not advance			
Irina Schönberger	Middleweight	Bye	Ryazeva (AZE); W 5–0	Langerová (CZE); W 5–0	Michel (FRA); L 0–5	Did not advance	3rd place, bronze medalist(s)

== Breakdancing ==
Team	Event	Group stage				Quarterfinal	Semifinal	Final / BM	
Team	Event	Opposition Score	Opposition Score	Opposition Score	Rank	Opposition Score	Opposition Score	Opposition Score	Rank
Jilou	B-Girl	Madmax (BEL); W 2–0	Nicka (LTU); L 0–2	Starus (POL); D 1–1	2 Q	India (NED); L 0–2	Did not advance		
Pauline	B-Girl	Syssy (FRA); L 0–2	India (NED); L 0–2	Furia (ESP); W 2–0	3	Did not advance			

== Canoe slalom ==
Men

Athlete	Event	Heats				Semifinals		Final	
Athlete	Event	Run 1	Rank	Run 2	Rank	Time	Rank	Time	Rank
Franz Anton	C1	90.93	1 Q	—N/a		99.98	10 Q	109.59	8
Sideris Tasiadis	C1	91.75	4 Q	—N/a		101.67	16	Did not advance	
Timo Trummer	C1	96.06	20 Q	—N/a		99.75	9 Q	98.57	5
Hannes Aigner	K1	88.56	18 Q	—N/a		92.88	12	Did not advance	
Noah Hegge	K1	86.46	7 Q	—N/a		96.33	25	Did not advance	
Stefan Hengst	K1	88.83	22 Q	—N/a		142.83	37	Did not advance	
Franz Anton; Sideris Tasiadis; Timo Trummer	Team C1	—N/a						101.69	1st place, gold medalist(s)
Hannes Aigner; Noah Hegge; Stefan Hengst	Team K1	—N/a						102.90	6

Women

Athlete	Event	Heats				Semifinals		Final	
Athlete	Event	Run 1	Rank	Run 2	Rank	Time	Rank	Time	Rank
Nele Bayn	C1	120.27	30	113.21	6 Q	117.04	15	Did not advance	
Andrea Herzog	C1	108.67	13 Q	—N/a		116.61	14	Did not advance	
Elena Lilik	C1	102.06	1 Q	—N/a		110.04	1 Q	109.67	1st place, gold medalist(s)
Emily Apel	K1	104.31	28	105.12	5 Q	106.65	16	Did not advance	
Ricarda Funk	K1	96.67	7 Q	—N/a		104.86	10 Q	99.09	1st place, gold medalist(s)
Elena Lilik	K1	95.75	5 Q	—N/a		101.79	1 Q	110.71	10
Nele Bayn; Andrea Herzog; Elena Lilik	Team C1	—N/a						121.60	3rd place, bronze medalist(s)
Emily Apel; Ricarda Funk; Elena Lilik	Team K1	—N/a						113.17	2nd place, silver medalist(s)

Kayak Cross

Athlete	Event	Qualification		Quarterfinal	Semifinal	Final
Athlete	Event	Time	Rank	Place	Place	Place
Hannes Aigner	Men's	65.06	17	Did not advance		
Noah Hegge	Men's	66.31	20	Did not advance		
Stefan Hengst	Men's	61.85	1 Q	2 Q	3	Did not advance
Emily Apel	Women's	FLT(4)	37	Did not advance		
Ricarda Funk	Women's	67.57	2 Q	1 Q	1 Q	2nd place, silver medalist(s)
Elena Lilik	Women's	68.41	6 Q	1 Q	3	Did not advance

== Canoe sprint ==
Men

Athlete	Event	Heats		Semifinals		Final	
Athlete	Event	Time	Rank	Time	Rank	Time	Rank
Nico Pickert	C-1 200 m	40.252	6 SF	41.364	6	Did not advance	
Peter Kretschmer; Tim Hecker	C-2 500 m	1:41.861	3 F	Bye		1:41.228	6
Max Lemke	K-1 200 m	35.343	7 SF	36.209	5	Did not advance	
Moritz Florstedt	K-1 500 m	1:40.041	1 FA	Bye		1:38.608	7
Felix Frank; Martin Hiller	K-2 500 m	1:29.471	1 F	Bye		1:29.825	2nd place, silver medalist(s)
Max Rendschmidt; Tom Liebscher; Jacob Schopf; Max Lemke	K-4 500 m	1:21.630	5 SF	1:22.321	1 F	1:20.972	5

Women

Athlete	Event	Heats		Semifinals		Final	
Athlete	Event	Time	Rank	Time	Rank	Time	Rank
Lisa Jahn	C-1 200 m	47.454	3 F	Bye		47.789	4
Annika Loske	C-1 500 m	—N/a				2:09.582	6
Lisa Jahn; Hedi Kliemke	C-2 500 m	2:01.212	3 F	Bye		2:01.121	5
Pauline Jagsch	K-1 500 m	1:55.113	3 SF	1:53.804	2 FA	1:53.041	8
Paulina Paszek; Jule Hake	K-2 500 m	1:41.250	1 F	Bye		1:43.304	4
Paulina Paszek; Jule Hake; Katinka Hofmann; Lena Röhlings	K-4 500 m	1:33.529	2 F	Bye		1:32.619	2nd place, silver medalist(s)

Mixed

Athlete	Event	Heats		Semifinals		Final	
Athlete	Event	Time	Rank	Time	Rank	Time	Rank
Nico Pickert; Annika Loske	C-2 200 m	41.506	3 F	Bye		40.697	3rd place, bronze medalist(s)
Jacob Schopf; Lena Röhlings	K-2 200 m	35.075	3 SF	34.194	1 FA	34.700	3rd place, bronze medalist(s)

== Cycling ==
=== Mountain bike ===
Athlete	Event	Time	Rank
Maximilian Brandl	Men's cross country	1:24:00	35
Georg Egger	Men's cross country	1:22:26	23
Leon Kaiser	Men's cross country	1:22:46	27
David List	Men's cross country	1:23:20	32
Luca Schwarzbauer	Men's cross country	1:20:08	4
Nina Benz	Women's cross country	1:24:44	22
Leonie Daubermann	Women's cross country	1:22:59	18
Ronja Eibl	Women's cross country	1:25:24	25
Lia Schrievers	Women's cross country	1:26:20	27
Theresia Schwenk	Women's cross country	1:31:29	38

=== BMX ===
Freestyle

Athlete	Event	Qualification		Final	
Athlete	Event	Points	Rank	Points	Rank
Timo Schulze	Men's park	67.88	17	Did not advance	
Paul Thölen	Men's park	71.53	14	Did not advance	
Lara Lessmann	Women's park	57.16	6 Q	68.00	5
Kim Lea Müller	Women's park	77.16	2 Q	79.66	2nd place, silver medalist(s)
Lillyana Seidler	Women's park	16.66	15	Did not advance	

== Diving ==
Men

Athlete	Event	Preliminary		Final	
Athlete	Event	Points	Rank	Points	Rank
Alexander Lube	1 metre springboard	326.70	11 Q	376.75	8
Moritz Wesemann	1 metre springboard	388.35	2 Q	377.20	7
Lars Rüdiger	3 metre springboard	381.30	12 Q	380.00	11
Moritz Wesemann	3 metre springboard	418.60	2 Q	465.40	1st place, gold medalist(s)
Timo Barthel	10 metre platform	434.15	1 Q	435.40	1st place, gold medalist(s)
Jaden Eikermann	10 metre platform	365.65	9 Q	365.75	9
Timo Barthel; Lars Rüdiger	3 metre springboard synchro	—N/a		372.96	7
Timo Barthel; Jaden Eikermann	10 metre platform synchro	—N/a		356.64	4

Women

Athlete	Event	Preliminary		Final	
Athlete	Event	Points	Rank	Points	Rank
Lena Hentschel	1 metre springboard	253.35	5 Q	260.75	5
Jette Müller	1 metre springboard	241.20	8 Q	248.80	7
Lena Hentschel	3 metre springboard	272.75	8 Q	304.95	4
Saskia Oettinghaus	3 metre springboard	274.95	7 Q	257.80	9
Christina Wassen	10 metre platform	285.75	3 Q	330.95	2nd place, silver medalist(s)
Elena Wassen	10 metre platform	266.00	8 Q	317.30	4
Lena Hentschel; Jana Rother	3 metre springboard synchro	—N/a		276.33	2nd place, silver medalist(s)
Christina Wassen; Elena Wassen	10 metre platform synchro	—N/a		297.72	1st place, gold medalist(s)

Mixed

Athlete	Event	Final	
Athlete	Event	Points	Rank
Alexander Lube; Jana Rother	3 metre springboard synchro	279.00	4
Alexander Lube; Elena Wassen	10 metre platform synchro	306.12	2nd place, silver medalist(s)
Timo Barthel; Lena Hentschel; Moritz Wesemann; Christina Wassen	Team event	377.10	4

== Fencing ==
Men

Athlete	Event	Group Stage							Round of 128	Round of 64	Round of 32	Round of 16	Quarterfinals	Semifinals	Final	
Athlete	Event	Opposition Result	Opposition Result	Opposition Result	Opposition Result	Opposition Result	Opposition Result	Rank	Opposition Result	Opposition Result	Opposition Result	Opposition Result	Opposition Result	Opposition Result	Opposition Result	Rank
Nikolaus Bodoczi	Épée	Markota (CRO); L 1–2	Cuomo (ITA); W 5–0	Bargues (ESP); W 3–2	Brandberg (SWE); W 5–3	Housieaux (BEL); L 0–1	Markopoulos (GRE); W 5–3	2 Q	Bye	Bargues (ESP); L 11–15	Did not advance					
Marco Brinkmann	Épée	Kolanczyk (POL); L 2–5	Jørgensen (DEN); W 5–4	Pietrobelli (IRL); W 5–3	Makiienko (UKR); L 4–5	Tobias (EST); W 5–1	—N/a	3 Q	Bye	Beran (CZE); W 15–7	Paavolainen (FIN); L 12–15	Did not advance				
Richard Schmidt	Épée	Nikolovski (MKD); W 5–2	Galabov (BUL); W 5–4	Tulen (NED); L 4–5	Svensson (SWE); W 3–2	Andrews (GBR); W 5–3	Kalininas (LTU); W 5–4	3 Q	Bye	Theodoropoulos (GRE); W 15–13	Frazão (POR); L 8–15	Did not advance				
Samuel Unterhauser	Épée	Stankevych (UKR); W 5–1	Oroian (ROU); W 5–4	Kavvadias (GRE); W 5–3	Johanides (SVK); W 5–2	Jensen (DEN); W 5–4	Mari (ALB); W 5–3	1 Q	Bye	Ferot (BEL); W 15–13	Reizlin (UKR); L 11–15	Did not advance				
Paul Luca Faul	Foil	Van Campenhout (BEL); L 2–5	Poscharnig (AUT); W 5–2	Files (CRO); L 4–5	Horn Nielsen (DEN); L 4–5	Papoyan (ARM); W 5–0	Peressini (ESP); W 5–1	4 Q	—N/a	Klein (GER); W 15–9	Totušek (CZE); L 8–15	Did not advance				
Alexander Kahl	Foil	Yuno (NED); W 5–1	Tóth (HUN); L 4–5	Rusu (ROU); W 5–0	Mepstead (GBR); W 5–0	Supe (LAT); W 5–0	Hertsyk (UKR); W 5–4	1 Q	—N/a	Bye	Goren (ISR); W 15–12	Rieger (GER); L 14–15	Did not advance			
Luis Klein	Foil	Spoljar (CRO); W 5–3	Jans Kohneke (NED); L 4–5	Hoida (UKR); L 3–5	Vadaniuc (MDA); W 5–2	Trams (LAT); W 5–2	Llavador (ESP); L 3–5	3 Q	—N/a	Faul (GER); L 9–15	Did not advance					
Laurenz Rieger	Foil	Chepishev (BUL); W 5–0	Pogrebniak (UKR); L 3–5	van Egmond (NED); L 2–5	Holy (CZE); W 5–2	Rządkowski (POL); W 5–2	Finsterbush (ISR); W 5–3	3 Q	—N/a	Bagdány (HUN); W 15–10	Cook (GBR); W 15–4	Kahl (GER); W 15–14	Yunes (UKR); W 15–13	Winterberg-Poulsen (DEN); L 11–15	Did not advance	3rd place, bronze medalist(s)
Raoul Bonah	Sabre	Taflan (TUR); W 5–0	Dragomir (ROU); W 5–2	Mateev (ISL); W 5–2	Predaris (GRE); W 5–2	Hernández (ESP); W 5–3	Curatoli (ITA); L 3–5	1 Q	—N/a	Bye	Neri (ITA); W 15–6	Deary (GBR); L 10–15	Did not advance			
Lorenz Kempf	Sabre	Szczepanik (POL); W 5–2	Szatmári (HUN); W 5–2	Lúdviksson (ISL); W 5–1	Tsap (UKR); W 5–3	Zaviršek (SLO); W 5–1	—N/a	1 Q	—N/a	Bye	Bazadze (GEO); W 15–11	Yıldırım (TUR); W 15–14	Szilágyi (HUN); L 8–15	Did not advance		
Frederic Kindler	Sabre	Bazadze (GEO); W 5–2	Statsenko (UKR); L 4–5	Szilágyi (HUN); L 2–5	Khasiyev (AZE); W 5–0	Frumgarzts (ISR); W 5–4	Cacek (SVK); W 5–4	3 Q	—N/a	Bye	Hryciuk (POL); L 6–15	Did not advance				
Matyas Szabo	Sabre	DNS														
Nikolaus Bodoczi; Marco Brinkmann; Richard Schmidt; Samuel Unterhauser	Team épée	—N/a									Greece; W 45–21	Ukraine; L 37–44	Belgium; W 45–33	Denmark; W 45–36	Israel; L 33–45	10
Alexander Kahl; Luis Klein; Laurenz Rieger	Team foil	—N/a									Bye	Israel; W 45–32	Poland; W 45–44	France; L 43–45	Great Britain; W 45–43	3rd place, bronze medalist(s)
Raoul Bonah; Lorenz Kempf; Frederic Kindler; Matyas Szabo	Team sabre	—N/a										Iceland; W 45–18	Spain; W 45–38	Italy; L 34–45	Hungary; W 45–28	3rd place, bronze medalist(s)

Women

Athlete	Event	Group Stage							Round of 64	Round of 32	Round of 16	Quarterfinals	Semifinals	Final	
Athlete	Event	Opposition Result	Opposition Result	Opposition Result	Opposition Result	Opposition Result	Opposition Result	Rank	Opposition Result	Opposition Result	Opposition Result	Opposition Result	Opposition Result	Opposition Result	Rank
Alexandra Ehler	Épée	Bajorūnaitė (LTU); W 1–0	Prokšíková (CZE); W 5–1	Kharkova (UKR); W 5–4	Jaakkola (FIN); L 3–4	Krieger (SUI); L 2–5	Muridova (GEO); W 1–0	3 Q	Goldmann (GER); W 15–14	Differt (EST); W 15–11	Ertürk (TUR); W 15–8	Muhari (HUN); W 15–12	Bezhura (UKR); L 12–15	Did not advance	3rd place, bronze medalist(s)
Lara Goldmann	Épée	Vandingenen (BEL); L 1–5	Grijak (SRB); W 5–3	Brovko (UKR); W 5–2	Salminen (FIN); L 1–5	Theodoropoulou (GRE); W 5–1	Swatowska-Wenglarczyk (POL); L 3–5	5 Q	Ehler (GER); L 14–15	Did not advance					
Ricarda Multerer	Épée	Favre (SUI); L 4–5	Bultynck (BEL); W 5–2	García (ESP); L 2–5	Lehtonen (FIN); W 5–0	Fransson (SWE); L 2–5	—N/a	4 Q	Kharkova (UKR); W 8–7	Kun (HUN); L 10–15	Did not advance				
Laura Wetzker	Épée	Embrich (EST); L 1–5	Engdahl (SWE); W 5–4	Veres (ROU); W 5–3	Majdandžić (CRO); L 3–5	Wimmer (HUN); W 5–4	Beken (BEL); W 5–3	2 Q	Swatowska-Wenglarczyk (POL); L 11–15	Did not advance					
Larissa Eifler	Sabre	Szűcs (HUN); W 5–4	Martis (ROU); W 5–3	Paizi (GRE); W 5–2	Wator (POL); L 3–5	Gregorio (ITA); W 5–4	—N/a	1 Q	Bye	Katona (HUN); L 12–15	Did not advance				
Julika Funke	Sabre	Hernández (ESP); W 5–3	Alkaya (TUR); L 4–5	Kozaczuk (POL); L 2–5	Bashta (AZE); L 2–5	Mpenou (GRE); L 3–5	Ilieva (BUL); W 5–3	6 Q	Bolshakova (AZE); L 11–15	Did not advance					
Elisabeth Gette	Sabre	Karimova (AZE); L 3–5	Martín-Portugues (ESP); L 3–5	Ivanova (BUL); W 5–3	Güngör (TUR); L 2–5	Pusztai (HUN); W 5–3	Pantis (ROU); L 4–5	5 Q	Hernández (ESP); L 14–15	Did not advance					
Felice Herbon	Sabre	Navarro (ESP); L 1–5	Mormile (ITA); L 0–5	Bakastova (UKR); L 2–5	Lutea (ROU); W 5–1	Katona (HUN); L 1–5	—N/a	6	Did not advance						
Alexandra Ehler; Lara Goldmann; Ricarda Multerer; Laura Wetzker	Team épée	—N/a								Bye	Estonia; L 30–31	Georgia; L 43–45	Finland; W 45–32	Czech Republic; W 45–32	13
Leandra Behr; Aliya Dhuique-Hein; Leonie Ebert; Anne Sauer	Team foil	—N/a									Israel; W 45–33	Poland; W 41–33	France; L 31–45	Hungary; W 45–38	3rd place, bronze medalist(s)
	Team sabre	—N/a									Poland; W 45–42	France; L 29–45	Spain; L 43–45	Greece; L 43–45	8

== Judo ==
Mixed team

Athlete	Category	Round of 32	Round of 16	Quarterfinals	Semifinals	Final	
Athlete	Category	Opposition Result	Opposition Result	Opposition Result	Opposition Result	Opposition Result	Rank
Jano Rübo; Martin Matijass; Erik Abramov; Losseni Koné; Seija Ballhaus; Pauline Starke; Miriam Butkereit; Renee Lucht	Mixed team	Bye	Austria; W 4–1	Hungary; W 4–3	Netherlands; W 4–2	Georgia; L 1–4	2nd place, silver medalist(s)

== Karate ==
Kumite

Athlete	Event	Group stage				Semifinals	Final	
Athlete	Event	Opposition Result	Opposition Result	Opposition Result	Rank	Opposition Result	Opposition Result	Rank
Florian Haas	Men's 60 kg	Crescenzo (ITA); L 0–2	Filipov (UKR); D 0–0	Gehtbarg (ISR); D 2–2	3	Did not advance		
Shara Hubrich	Women's 50 kg	Özçelik (TUR); D 0–0	Teymurova (AZE); L 1–3	Perfetto (ITA); D 2–2	4	Did not advance		
Gizem Buğur	Women's 55 kg	Brunori (ITA); D 2–2	Yakan (TUR); L 2–3	Terliuga (UKR); L 0–3	3	Did not advance		
Reem Khamis	Women's 61 kg	Mikulska (POL); W 5–4	Snel (NED); W 4–0	Gözütok (TUR); W 3–0	1 Q	Mangiacapra (ITA); W 7–1	Serogina (UKR); W 2*–2	1st place, gold medalist(s)
Johanna Kneer	Women's +68 kg	Kydonaki (GRE); W 4–2	Keinänen (FIN); W 1–0	Daniszewska (POL); W 5–0	1 Q	Torres (ESP); W 7–2	Ferracuti (ITA); W 5*–5	1st place, gold medalist(s)

== Kickboxing ==
Full contact

Athlete	Event	Quarterfinals	Semifinals	Final	
Athlete	Event	Opposition Result	Opposition Result	Opposition Result	Rank
Aline Sodjinou	Women's 70 kg	Filipová (SVK); W 2–1	Juja (POL); W 2–0	Krstić (SRB); L 1–2	2nd place, silver medalist(s)

Light contact

Athlete	Event	Quarterfinals	Semifinals	Final	
Athlete	Event	Opposition Result	Opposition Result	Opposition Result	Rank
Anis Triqui	Men's 63 kg	Zagoranski (SLO); W 3–0	Iglesias (ESP); W RSC R1	Penzo (ITA); L 0–3	2nd place, silver medalist(s)
Al Amin Rmadan	Men's 79 kg	Zamyatin (UKR); W 3–0	Krastanov (BUL); W 3–0	Fésű (HUN); W 3–0	1st place, gold medalist(s)
Michelle Mesmer	Women's 50 kg	Hagen (SUI); W 2–1	Nikolova (BUL); L 0–3	Did not advance	3rd place, bronze medalist(s)

Pointfighting

Athlete	Event	Quarterfinals	Semifinals	Final	
Athlete	Event	Opposition Result	Opposition Result	Opposition Result	Rank
Roland Viczian	Men's 63 kg	Kasprzyk (POL); W 11–1	Tsampodimos (GRE); L 9–19	Did not advance	3rd place, bronze medalist(s)
Sandro Peters	Men's 84 kg	Papadopoulos (GRE); W 11–1	Kır (TUR); W 13–3	McGlinchey (IRL); W 16–15	1st place, gold medalist(s)
Angelina Bröhan	Women's 50 kg	Trovalusci (ITA); L 5–15	Did not advance		
Kiara Mager	Women's 60 kg	Sjövall (FIN); W 14–4	Ceci (ITA); L 6–9	Did not advance	3rd place, bronze medalist(s)
Stefanie Megerle	Women's 70 kg	Baloh (SLO); L 13–14	Did not advance		

== Modern pentathlon ==
Individual

Athlete	Event	Qualification											Semifinal												Final														
Athlete	Event	Fencing (épée one touch)			Swimming (200 m freestyle)			Combined: shooting/running (10 m air pistol)/(3200 m)			Total points	Final rank	Fencing (épée one touch)				Swimming (200 m freestyle)			Combined: shooting/running (10 m air pistol)/(3200 m)			Total points	Final rank	Fencing (épée one touch)				Riding (show jumping)			Swimming (200 m freestyle)			Combined: shooting/running (10 m air pistol)/(3200 m)			Total points	Final rank
Athlete	Event	RR	Rank	MP points	Time	Rank	MP points	Time	Rank	MP points	Total points	Final rank	RR	BR	Rank	MP points	Time	Rank	MP points	Time	Rank	MP points	Total points	Final rank	RR	BR	Rank	MP points	Penalties	Rank	MP points	Time	Rank	MP points	Time	Rank	MP points	Total points	Final rank
Janine Kohlmann	Women's individual	14	19	208	2:16.35	8	278	11:24	7	616	1102	16 Q	20	0	3	225	2:16.69	7	277	11:36	11	604	1106	7 Q	20	1	5	227	7	9	293	2:16.34	8	278	11:40	13	600	1398	12
Rebecca Langrehr	Women's individual	17	9	229	2:17.97	11	275	11:40	13	600	1104	11 Q	21	1	1	234	2:16.23	5	278	11:39	13	601	1113	1 Q	21	1	4	232	2	7	298	2:16.11	7	278	11:43	14	597	1405	10
Cicelle Leh	Women's individual	8	26	166	2:23.27	23	264	12:18	17	562	992	24	Did not advance																										
Annika Zillekens	Women's individual	16	8	222	2:16.13	12	278	12:00	8	580	1080	3 Q	20	0	6	225	2:17.50	9	275	11:29	9	611	1111	6 Q	20	1	6	227	1	6	299	2:17.87	11	275	11:26	12	614	1415	8
Marvin Dogue	Men's individual	15	14	215	2:05.64	18	299	10:18	7	682	1196	6 Q	22	3	2	241	2:07.49	13	296	10:34	10	666	1203	4 Q	22	1	4	237	0	2	300	2:04.92	12	301	10:23	10	677	1515	6
Patrick Dogue	Men's individual	18	5	236	2:03.94	11	303	10:49	16	651	1190	7 Q	25	0	1	250	2:07.95	15	295	10:36	14	664	1209	5 Q	25	1	2	252	21	15	279	2:05.97	15	299	10:35	16	665	1495	10
Pele Uibel	Men's individual	17	7	229	2:08.47	22	294	10:31	12	669	1192	17 Q	15	1	12	202	2:09.43	17	292	10:33	9	667	1161	15	Did not advance														
Christian Zillekens	Men's individual	15	14	215	2:06.45	24	295	10:20	5	680	1190	6 Q	15	1	14	202	2:06.92	13	297	9:58	2	702	1201	10	Did not advance														

Team

Athlete	Event	Fencing (épée one touch)				Riding (show jumping)			Swimming (200 m freestyle)			Combined: shooting/running (10 m air pistol)/(3200 m)			Total points	Final rank
Athlete	Event	RR	BR	Rank	MP points	Penalties	Rank	MP points	Time	Rank	MP points	Time	Rank	MP points	Total points	Final rank
Christian Zillekens; Cicelle Leh	Mixed relay	13	0	9	215	36	12	264	2:00.99	9	309	12:18	7	562	1350	9

== Muaythai ==
Athlete	Event	Quarterfinals	Semifinals	Final	
Athlete	Event	Opposition Result	Opposition Result	Opposition Result	Rank
Philipp Balbach	Men's 60 kg	Khachikyan (ARM); L RSC R3	Did not advance		
Jan Soentgen	Men's 81 kg	Malina (CZE); L RSC R3	Did not advance		

== Padel ==
Athlete	Event	Round of 32	Round of 16	Quarterfinals	Semifinals	Final / BM	
Athlete	Event	Opposition Score	Opposition Score	Opposition Score	Opposition Score	Opposition Score	Rank
Johannes Lindmeyer; Matthias Wunner	Men's doubles	Urvolgyi / Szakacs (HUN); W 6–1, 6–1	Santigosa / Gala (ESP); L 2–6, 5–7	Did not advance			
Kristina Clement; Corina Scholten	Women's doubles	Wyckaert / Mestach (BEL); L 1–6, 1–6	Did not advance				
Victoria Kurz; Denise Höfer	Women's doubles	McRann / Claffey (IRL); W 6–0, 6–4	Rasmussen / Haxen (DEN); L 4–6, 4–6	Did not advance			
Victoria Kurz; Matthias Wunner	Mixed doubles	—N/a	Deus / Rodrigues (POR); W 6–4, 6–4	Cassetta / Sussarello (ITA); L 3–6, 1–6	Did not advance		

== Rugby sevens ==
Team	Event	Group stage				Quarterfinals	Semifinals	Final / BM	
Team	Event	Opposition Score	Opposition Score	Opposition Score	Rank	Opposition Score	Opposition Score	Opposition Score	Rank
Germany men's	Men's tournament	Italy; D 19–19	Poland; W 47–0	Ireland; L 7–19	2 Q	Great Britain; L 10–14	Italy; W 21–19	Belgium; L 0–24	6
Germany women's	Women's tournament	Portugal; L 17–19	Turkey; W 31–5	Poland; L 7–43	3 Q	Great Britain; L 0–53	Portugal; W 22–7	Spain; L 5–26	6

== Shooting ==
Men

Athlete	Event	Qualification		Ranking Match		Final	
Athlete	Event	Points	Rank	Points	Rank	Opponent	Rank
Michael Schwald	10 metre air pistol	575	21	Did not advance			
Robin Walter	10 metre air pistol	580	4 Q	252.0	1 Q	Keleş (TUR); L 13–17	2nd place, silver medalist(s)
Maximilian Dallinger	10 metre air rifle	627.9	14	Did not advance			
Maximilian Ulbrich	10 metre air rifle	630.9	3 Q	261.5	1 Q	Sollazzo (ITA); L 7–17	2nd place, silver medalist(s)
Florian Peter	25 metre rapid fire pistol	582	5 Q	15	1 Q	12	4
Christian Reitz	25 metre rapid fire pistol	589	1 Q	15	1 Q	28	2nd place, silver medalist(s)
Maximilian Dallinger	50 metre rifle three positions	585	20	Did not advance			
David Könders	50 metre rifle three positions	585	21	Did not advance			
Vincent Haaga	Skeet	122	7 Q	27	3	Did not advance	
Sven Korte	Skeet	122	11	Did not advance			
Paul Pigorsch	Trap	120	13	Did not advance			
Christian Reitz; Michael Schwald; Robin Walter	Team 10 metre air pistol	876	1 Q	577	2 QG	Turkey; W 16–14	1st place, gold medalist(s)
Maximilian Dallinger; David Könders; Maximilian Ulbrich	Team 10 metre air rifle	943.8	2 Q	623.1	7	Did not advance	
Maximilian Dallinger; David Könders; Maximilian Ulbrich	Team 50 metre rifle three positions	1313	8 Q	879	5	Did not advance	
Vincent Haaga; Felix Haase; Sven Korte	Team skeet	215	3 QB	—N/a		Greece; L 2–6	4

Women

Athlete	Event	Qualification		Ranking Match		Final	
Athlete	Event	Points	Rank	Points	Rank	Points	Rank
Josefin Eder	10 metre air pistol	565	24	Did not advance			
Sandra Reitz	10 metre air pistol	574	9	Did not advance			
Anna Janssen	10 metre air rifle	627.6	12	Did not advance			
Lisa Müller	10 metre air rifle	628.0	8 Q	151.0	8	Did not advance	
Michelle Skeries	25 metre pistol	574	19	Did not advance			
Doreen Vennekamp	25 metre pistol	585	2 Q	13	1 Q	18	3rd place, bronze medalist(s)
Jolyn Beer	50 metre rifle three positions	588	6 Q	304.5	7	Did not advance	
Lisa Müller	50 metre rifle three positions	584	14	Did not advance			
Nadine Messerschmidt	Skeet	120	7 Q	30	1 Q	25	3rd place, bronze medalist(s)
Nele Wissmer	Skeet	120	8 Q	16	4	Did not advance	
Kathrin Murche	Trap	111	23	Did not advance			
Bettina Valdorf	Trap	114	16	Did not advance			
Josefin Eder; Sandra Reitz; Doreen Vennekamp	Team 10 metre air pistol	864	1 Q	575	1 QG	France; W 16–8	1st place, gold medalist(s)
Jolyn Beer; Anna Janssen; Lisa Müller	Team 10 metre air rifle	939.6	6 Q	626.1	5	Did not advance	
Sandra Reitz; Michelle Skeries; Doreen Vennekamp	Team 25 metre pistol	873	2 Q	435	4 QB	Hungary; W 16–12	3rd place, bronze medalist(s)
Jolyn Beer; Anna Janssen; Lisa Müller	Team 50 metre rifle three positions	1327	2 Q	876	3 QB	Ukraine; W 16–4	3rd place, bronze medalist(s)
Sarah Bindrich; Kathrin Murche; Bettina Valdorf	Team trap	196	4 QB	—N/a		Finland; W 6–5	3rd place, bronze medalist(s)

Mixed

Athlete	Event	Qualification		Final	
Athlete	Event	Points	Rank	Points	Rank
Sandra Reitz; Robin Walter	Team 10 metre air pistol	570	20	Did not advance	
Michael Schwald; Doreen Vennekamp	Team 10 metre air pistol	569	21	Did not advance	
Anna Janssen; Maximilian Ulbrich	Team 10 metre air rifle	616.4	31	Did not advance	
Lisa Müller; Maximilian Dallinger	Team 10 metre air rifle	622.6	28	Did not advance	
Maximilian Dallinger; Jolyn Beer	Team 50 metre rifle three positions	868	19	Did not advance	
David Könders; Lisa Müller	Team 50 metre rifle three positions	869	18	Did not advance	
Vincent Haaga; Nele Wissmer	Team skeet	142	13	Did not advance	
Sven Korte; Nadine Messerschmidt	Team skeet	144	9	Did not advance	
Paul Pigorsch; Kathrin Murche	Team trap	141	6	Did not advance	

== Ski jumping ==
Men

Athlete	Event	First round			Final			Total	
Athlete	Event	Distance	Points	Rank	Distance	Points	Rank	Points	Rank
Felix Hoffmann	Normal hill	100.0	118.3	10 Q	98.0	118.4	14	237.7	13
Philipp Raimund	Normal hill	103.0	127.0	4 Q	103.0	130.0	6	257.0	4
Luca Roth	Normal hill	100.5	118.0	11 Q	93.0	105.1	27	223.1	21
Constantin Schmid	Normal hill	99.0	119.0	9 Q	102.5	130.5	4	249.5	7
Felix Hoffmann	Large hill	123.5	114.0	28 Q	133.5	122.3	12	236.3	17
Philipp Raimund	Large hill	138.0	138.6	3 Q	132.5	133.2	4	271.8	3rd place, bronze medalist(s)
Luca Roth	Large hill	126.5	121.2	18 Q	121.0	109.1	27	230.3	26
Constantin Schmid	Large hill	130.5	125.2	11 Q	126.5	109.6	26	234.8	19

Women

Athlete	Event	First round			Final			Total	
Athlete	Event	Distance	Points	Rank	Distance	Points	Rank	Points	Rank
Selina Freitag	Normal hill	90.0	115.1	7 Q	94.0	112.8	8	227.9	8
Luisa Görlich	Normal hill	83.5	90.4	22 Q	83.0	84.0	23	174.4	22
Pauline Heßler	Normal hill	81.0	84.4	24 Q	86.0	98.0	18	184.0	20
Anna Rupprecht	Normal hill	83.0	91.9	18 Q	86.0	105.7	16	197.6	16
Katharina Schmid	Normal hill	85.5	96.1	15 Q	94.0	111.5	10	207.6	14
Selina Freitag	Large hill	126.5	115.6	4 Q	130.5	130.2	2	245.8	3rd place, bronze medalist(s)
Luisa Görlich	Large hill	101.0	61.0	26 Q	104.0	69.3	27	130.3	27
Pauline Heßler	Large hill	115.5	83.1	17 Q	122.0	99.5	16	182.6	16
Anna Rupprecht	Large hill	119.0	97.5	10 Q	117.0	100.0	15	197.5	11
Katharina Schmid	Large hill	118.0	96.5	11 Q	126.0	111.0	9	207.5	9

Mixed

Athlete	Event	First round			Final			Total	
Athlete	Event	Distance	Points	Rank	Distance	Points	Rank	Points	Rank
Anna Rupprecht; Constantin Schmid; Selina Freitag; Philipp Raimund	Team normal hill	390.0	402.5	4	379.5	415.8	4	818.3	4

== Sport climbing ==
Boulder

Athlete	Event	Semifinal		Final	
Athlete	Event	Result	Rank	Result	Rank
Lasse von Freier	Men's boulder	1T3z 1 7	5 Q	0T2z 0 8	6
Tim Würthner	Men's boulder	1T2z 3 6	7	Did not advance	
Afra Hönig	women's boulder	1T1z 2 1	10	Did not advance	
Leonie Lochner	women's boulder	0T0z 0 0	15	Did not advance	

Lead

Athlete	Event	Semifinal		Final	
Athlete	Event	Time	Rank	Time	Rank
Emma Bernhard	Women's lead	37+	12	Did not advance	

Speed

Athlete	Event	Seeding		Elimination	Quarterfinal	Semifinal	Final	
Athlete	Event	Time	Rank	Opposition Time	Opposition Time	Opposition Time	Opposition Time	Rank
Linus Bader	Men's speed	6.109	10	Amon (AUT); L 6.080	Did not advance			
Dorian Zedler	Men's speed	6.190	11	Rebreyend (FRA); L Fall	Did not advance			
Nele Thomas	Women's speed	8.927	9	—N/a	Did not advance			

== Table tennis ==
Men

Athlete	Event	Round 1	Round 2	Round of 32	Round of 16	Quarterfinals	Semifinals	Final / BM	
Athlete	Event	Opposition Result	Opposition Result	Opposition Result	Opposition Result	Opposition Result	Opposition Result	Opposition Result	Rank
Dimitrij Ovtcharov	Singles	Bye		Haug (NOR); W 4–0	Ionescu (ROU); L 2–4	Did not advance			
Dang Qiu	Singles	Bye		Drinkhall (GBR); W 4–0	Stoyanov (ITA); W 4–0	Lebrun (FRA); L 1–4	Did not advance		
Patrick Franziska; Dimitrij Ovtcharov; Dang Qiu	Team	—N/a			Bye	Belgium; W 3–0	Portugal; W 3–1	Sweden; W 3–1	1st place, gold medalist(s)

Women

Athlete	Event	Round 1	Round 2	Round of 32	Round of 16	Quarterfinals	Semifinals	Final / BM	
Athlete	Event	Opposition Result	Opposition Result	Opposition Result	Opposition Result	Opposition Result	Opposition Result	Opposition Result	Rank
Han Ying	Singles	Bye		Piccolin (ITA); W 4–0	Bergström (SWE); W 4–2	Samara (ROU); L 2–4	Did not advance		
Nina Mittelham	Singles	Bye		Xiao (ESP); W 4–2	Shao (POR); W 4–1	Szőcs (ROU); L 2–4	Did not advance		
Han Ying; Nina Mittelham; Shan Xiaona	Team	—N/a			Bye	Sweden; W 3–1	Portugal; W 3–0	Romania; L 2–3	2nd place, silver medalist(s)

Mixed

Athlete	Event	Round of 16	Quarterfinals	Semifinals	Final / BM	
Athlete	Event	Opposition Result	Opposition Result	Opposition Result	Opposition Result	Rank
Dang Qiu; Nina Mittelham	Doubles	Mladenovic / Ni (LUX); W 3–1	Gündüz / Altınkaya (TUR); W 3–1	Robles / Xiao (ESP); W 3–1	Ecseki / Madarász (HUN); W 3–0	1st place, gold medalist(s)

== Taekwondo ==
Men

Athlete	Event	Round of 16	Quarterfinals	Semifinals	Repechage	Final / BM	
Athlete	Event	Opposition Result	Opposition Result	Opposition Result	Opposition Result	Opposition Result	Rank
Khaled Abdel Halim	Finweight	Dadashov (AZE); L 0–2	Did not advance		Bogdanov (BUL); L 1–2	Did not advance	
Cemal Malkoc	Flyweight	Nowak (POL); W 2–0	Lomartire (ITA); L 0–2	Did not advance			
Imran Özkaya	Bantamweight	Stanić (SRB); L 1–2	Did not advance				
Alexander Bachmann	Middleweight	Suleymanov (AZE); W 2–1	Martínez (ESP); L 0–2	Did not advance			
Marc Lenkewitz	Heavyweight	Božić (CRO); L 0–2	Did not advance				

Women

Athlete	Event	Round of 16	Quarterfinals	Semifinals	Repechage	Final / BM	
Athlete	Event	Opposition Result	Opposition Result	Opposition Result	Opposition Result	Opposition Result	Rank
Süheda Nur Çelik	Finweight	Yıldırım (TUR); W 2–0	Bayech (ISR); W 2–0	Zampetti (ITA); L 0–2	—N/a	Goodman (GBR); W 2–0	3rd place, bronze medalist(s)
Supharada Kisskalt	Flyweight	Abakarova (AZE); W 2–0	Avdagić (BIH); W 2–0	Dinçel (TUR); L 0–2	—N/a	Maestro (ITA); W 2–1	3rd place, bronze medalist(s)
Ela Aydin	Bantamweight	Al Halwani (ITA); W 2–1	Yağcı (TUR); W 2–1	Duvančić (CRO); L 1–2	—N/a	Hronová (CZE); L 0–2	5
Anna Lena Frömming	Lightweight	Arelić (CRO); L 0–2	Did not advance				
Vanessa Körndl	Welterweight	Roberts (GBR); W 2–1	Jelić (CRO); L 1–2	Did not advance			
Alema Hadzic	Middleweight	Berisaj (MNE); L 0–2	Did not advance				
Lorena Brandl	Heavyweight	Bye	Avoulète (FRA); L 0–2	Did not advance			

== Teqball ==
Team	Event	Group stage				Quarterfinal	Semifinal	Final / BM	
Team	Event	Opposition Score	Opposition Score	Opposition Score	Rank	Opposition Score	Opposition Score	Opposition Score	Rank
Jon Nielsen	Men's singles	Sirghi (MDA); L (5–12, 3–12)	Rabeux (FRA); L (3–12, 5–12)	—N/a	3	Did not advance			
Jon Nielsen; Yannic Stächelin	Men's doubles	Pinheiro / Santos (POR); L (6–12, 1–12)	Rabeux / Beyer (FRA); L (0–12, 1–12)	—N/a	3	Did not advance			
Dana Hillmann	Women's singles	Julian (FRA); L (3–12, 8–12)	Zelenska (UKR); W (9–12, 12–11, 12–5)	Mangasaryan (ARM); W (12–2, 12–10)	2 Q	Barabási (ROU); L (7–12, 4–12)	Did not advance		
Stella Glöckner; Dana Hillmann	Women's doubles	Christensen / Dahlmann (DEN); L (10–12, 8–12)	Julian / Lanche (FRA); L (9–12, 10–12)	Kecerová / Zušťáková (SVK); W (11–12, 12–10, 12–5)	3	Did not advance			
Stella Glöckner; Yannic Stächelin	Mixed doubles	Flaks / Zachová (CZE); L (3–12, 3–12)	Jeppesen / Dahlmann (DEN); L (9–12, 5–12)	Santos / Parente (POR); L (5–12, 4–12)	4	Did not advance			

== Triathlon ==
Athlete	Event	Swim (1.5 km)	Trans 1	Bike (40 km)	Trans 2	Run (10 km)	Total Time	Rank
Simon Henseleit	Men	18:24	0:49	56:44	0:23	30:42	1:47:02	7
Cedric Osterholt	Men	18:21	0:55	56:43	0:27	31:59	1:48:25	19
Jonas Osterholt	Men	18:35	0:51	56:33	0:28	31:56	1:48:23	18
Jule Behrens	Women	20:42	0:57	1:00:26	0:32	34:53	1:57:30	6
Julia Bröcker	Women	20:59	0:55	1:04:14	0:30	35:44	2:02:22	24
Selina Klamt	Women	19:43	0:57	1:01:20	0:30	34:57	1:57:27	4
Simon Henseleit; Selina Klamt; Jonas Osterholt; Jule Behrens	Mixed relay	15:58	1:58	30:57	1:49	18:49	1:09:52	13
