= Diving at the 2022 European Aquatics Championships – Mixed 10 m platform synchro =

Mixed 10 m platform synchro at the 2022 European Aquatics Championships
- Venue: Foro Italico
- Dates: 16 August
- Competitors: 12 from 6 nations
- Winning points: 300.78

Medalists
gold medal	Kyle Kothari; Lois Toulson	Great Britain
silver medal	Sofiya Lyskun; Oleksiy Sereda	Ukraine
bronze medal	Sarah Jodoin Di Maria; Eduard Timbretti Gugiu	Italy

The Mixed 10 m platform synchro competition of the 2022 European Aquatics Championships was held on 16 August 2022.

== Results ==
The final started at 14:10.

Rank	Nation	Divers	Points					
Rank	Nation	Divers	T1	T2	T3	T4	T5	Total
1st place, gold medalist(s)	Great Britain	Kyle Kothari; Lois Toulson	46.80	47.40	69.30	67.20	70.08	300.78
2nd place, silver medalist(s)	Ukraine	Sofiya Lyskun; Oleksiy Sereda	47.40	48.00	78.72	62.10	62.37	298.59
3rd place, bronze medalist(s)	Italy	Sarah Jodoin Di Maria; Eduard Timbretti Gugiu	43.20	41.40	68.40	69.12	68.16	290.28
4	Germany	Lou Massenberg; Elena Wassen	48.60	47.40	58.56	54.90	69.12	278.58
5	Spain	Valeria Antolino; Carlos Camacho	40.80	44.40	54.90	48.96	66.24	255.30
6	France	Jade Gillet; Gary Hunt	46.20	32.40	52.92	26.10	55.08	212.70
