= 2019 European Diving Championships – Women's 10 metre platform =

Women's 10 metre platform event at the 2019 European Diving Championships was contested on 6 August.

== Results ==
19 athletes participated at the event; the best 12 from the Preliminary round qualified for the Final.

=== Preliminary round ===
Rank	Diver	Nationality	D1	D2	D3	D4	D5	Total
1	Yulia Timoshinina	Russia	63.00	49.60	51.15	70.95	65.60	300.30
2	Celine van Duijn	Netherlands	63.00	52.20	60.80	54.00	65.60	295.60
3	Maria Kurjo	Germany	50.40	62.40	61.50	50.75	54.40	279.45
4	Sarah Jodoin Di Maria	Italy	56.00	49.50	46.40	62.40	57.60	271.90
5	Ellen Ek	Sweden	56.55	49.00	49.00	56.55	57.00	268.10
6	Noemi Batki	Italy	58.50	38.40	62.40	68.80	38.80	265.90
7	Sofiya Lyskun	Ukraine	64.00	22.50	64.00	55.10	57.40	263.00
8	Ekaterina Beliaeva	Russia	51.00	52.80	59.20	26.60	72.00	261.60
9	Tanya Watson	Ireland	33.60	59.20	46.40	56.55	54.00	249.75
10	Eden Cheng	Great Britain	54.00	56.00	47.60	29.70	59.20	246.50
11	Alaïs Kalonji	France	43.20	52.80	52.80	33.60	60.20	242.60
12	Christina Wassen	Germany	35.20	49.50	26.10	54.40	65.60	230.80
13	Maïssam Naji	France	36.80	26.10	47.60	68.80	46.40	225.70
14	Anne Vilde Tuxen	Norway	50.40	38.40	44.80	47.85	33.75	215.20
15	Gemma McArthur	Great Britain	62.40	57.00	0.00	37.70	56.00	213.10
16	Mihaela-Antonia Pavel	Romania	38.40	54.40	33.00	48.00	34.80	208.60
17	Nicoleta Angelica Muscalu	Romania	58.80	70.40	49.50	0.00	26.10	204.80
18	Helle Tuxen	Norway	36.25	38.40	37.80	43.50	42.00	197.95
19	Ciara McGinn	Ireland	58.80	35.20	46.20	14.85	38.40	193.45

=== Final ===
Rank	Diver	Nationality	D1	D2	D3	D4	D5	Total
1st place, gold medalist(s)	Sofiya Lyskun	Ukraine	76.80	49.50	78.40	60.90	64.40	330.00
2nd place, silver medalist(s)	Celine van Duijn	Netherlands	56.00	60.90	62.40	66.00	59.20	304.50
3rd place, bronze medalist(s)	Yulia Timoshinina	Russia	63.00	49.60	62.00	61.05	68.80	304.45
4	Maria Kurjo	Germany	58.80	65.60	58.50	56.55	60.80	300.25
5	Christina Wassen	Germany	52.80	54.00	56.55	56.00	65.60	284.95
6	Noemi Batki	Italy	61.50	36.80	67.20	48.00	61.60	275.10
7	Anaïs Kalonji	France	60.75	49.60	57.60	49.00	54.60	271.55
8	Sarah Jodoin Di Maria	Italy	56.00	58.50	31.90	57.60	62.40	266.40
9	Eden Cheng	Great Britain	63.00	72.00	37.80	34.65	57.60	265.05
10	Tanya Watson	Ireland	53.20	43.20	43.20	59.45	48.60	247.65
11	Ekaterina Beliaeva	Russia	69.00	68.80	0.00	28.00	72.00	237.80
12	Ellen Ek	Sweden	52.20	44.80	49.00	34.80	30.00	210.80
