= 2023 European Diving Championships – Women's synchronized 10 metre platform =

Women's synchronized 10 metre platform at the 2023 European Diving Championships
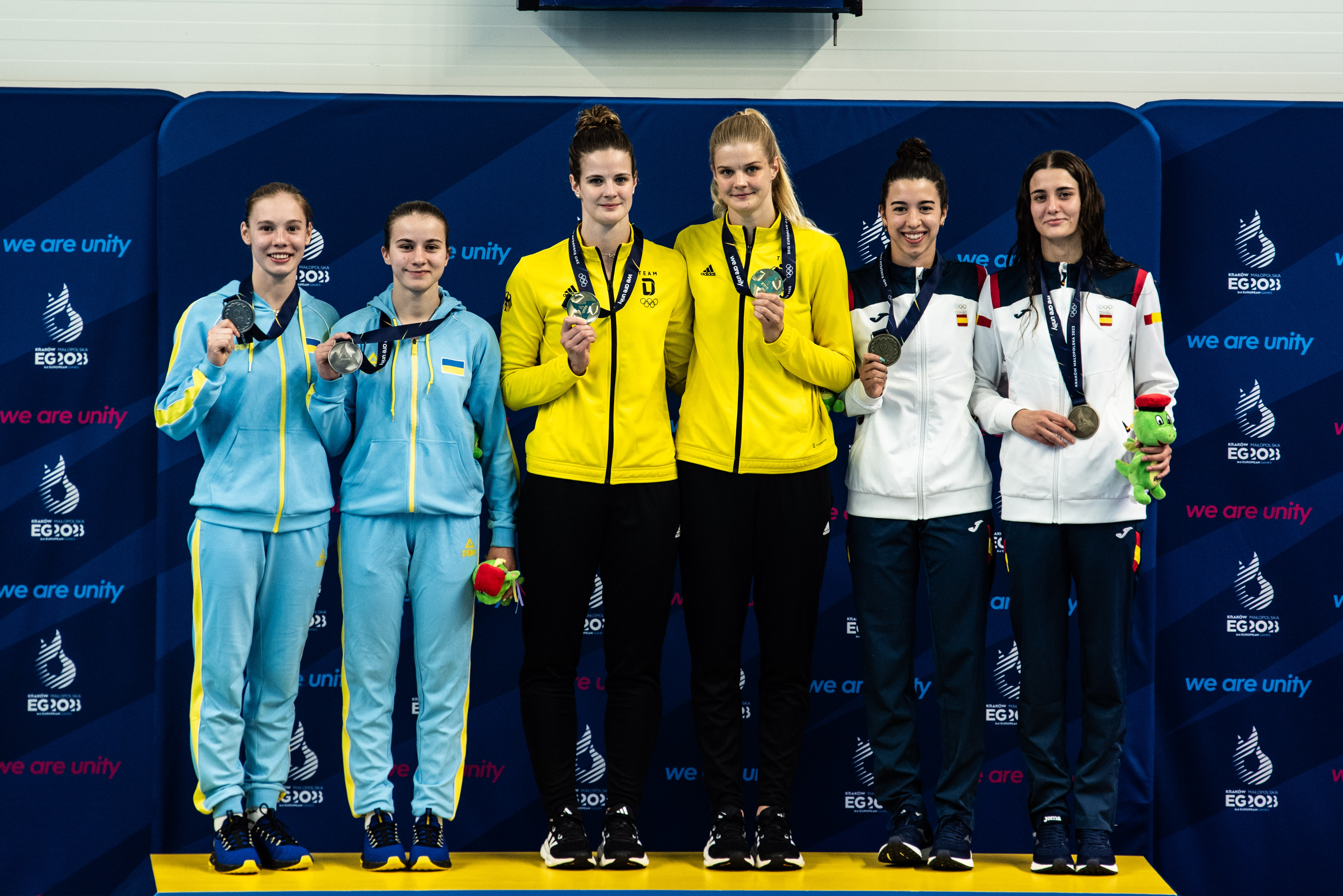
- Venue: Rzeszów Diving Arena
- Date: 27 June
- Competitors: 16 from 8 nations
- Teams: 8
- Winning points: 297.72

Medalists
gold medal	Christina Wassen; Elena Wassen	Germany
silver medal	Kseniya Baylo; Sofia Esman	Ukraine
bronze medal	Valeria Antolino; Ana Carvajal	Spain

The women's synchronized 10 metre platform event at the 2023 European Diving Championships was held on 27 June 2023.

== Results ==
The final was held at 16:00.

Rank	Nation	Divers	D1	D2	D3	D4	D5	Total
1st place, gold medalist(s)	Germany	Christina Wassen; Elena Wassen	48.00	50.40	60.48	63.00	75.84	297.72
2nd place, silver medalist(s)	Ukraine	Kseniya Baylo; Sofia Esman	42.60	44.40	62.16	64.32	61.20	274.68
3rd place, bronze medalist(s)	Spain	Valeria Antolino; Ana Carvajal	46.20	47.40	58.50	46.98	62.40	261.48
4	Italy	Maia Biginelli; Elettra Neroni	41.40	40.20	54.00	43.20	66.24	245.04
5	France	Jade Gillet; Emily Halifax	45.60	38.40	35.28	52.08	49.92	221.28
6	Romania	Ioana Cârcu; Nazanin Ellahi	33.00	39.00	53.76	43.50	42.09	211.35
7	Greece	Stavroula Chalemou; Ioanna Karakosta	41.40	39.00	40.02	47.25	42.12	209.79
8	Great Britain	Maisie Bond; Juliette John	40.20	43.20	53.10	0.00	62.40	198.90
