= 2017 European Diving Championships – Women's synchronized 10 metre platform =

== Results ==
Rank	Diver	Nationality	Final	
Rank	Diver	Nationality	Points	Rank
1st place, gold medalist(s)	Ruby Bower; Phoebe Banks	Great Britain	299.19	1
2nd place, silver medalist(s)	Yulia Timoshinina; Valeriia Belova	Russia	297.00	2
3rd place, bronze medalist(s)	Valeriia Liulko; Sofiia Lyskun	Ukraine	288.96	3
4	Noemi Batki; Chiara Pellacani	Italy	275.58	4
5	Elena Wassen; Christina Wassen	Germany	275.07	5
6	Inge Jansen; Celine van Duijn	Netherlands	272.94	6
