= Diving at the 2024 European Aquatics Championships – Women's 10 m synchro platform =

Women's 10 m synchro platform at the 2024 European Aquatics Championships
- Venue: Serbian Institute For Sports And Sports Medicine
- Dates: 22 June
- Competitors: 10 from 5 nations
- Teams: 5
- Winning points: 288.78

Medalists
gold medal	Kseniia Bailo; Sofiia Lyskun	Ukraine
silver medal	Valeria Antolino; Ana Carvajal	Spain
bronze medal	Jade Gillet; Naïs Gillet	France

The Women's 10 m synchro springboard competition of the 2024 European Aquatics Championships was held on 22 June 2024.

== Results ==
The final was started at 15:30.

Rank	Nation	Divers	Points					
Rank	Nation	Divers	T1	T2	T3	T4	T5	Total
1st place, gold medalist(s)	Ukraine	Kseniia Bailo; Sofiia Lyskun	51.60	47.40	58.80	65.28	65.70	288.78
2nd place, silver medalist(s)	Spain	Valeria Antolino; Ana Carvajal	49.80	39.60	50.40	56.55	64.32	260.67
3rd place, bronze medalist(s)	France	Jade Gillet; Naïs Gillet	45.00	40.80	51.24	47.88	55.68	240.60
4	Greece	Stavroula Chalemou; Ioanna Karakosta	37.20	45.00	41.40	55.50	44.46	223.56
5	Romania	Amelie-Enya Foerster; Nicoleta-Angelica Muscalu	40.20	36.60	41.40	42.84	52.80	213.84
