= Diving at the 2022 Commonwealth Games – Women's 10 metre platform =

Women's 10 metre platform at the 2022 Commonwealth Games
- Venue: Sandwell Aquatics Centre
- Date: 4 August
- Competitors: 14 from 8 nations
- Winning score: 357.50

Medalists
gold medal	Andrea Spendolini-Sirieix	England
silver medal	Lois Toulson	England
bronze medal	Caeli McKay	Canada

The women's 10 metre platform was part of the Diving at the 2022 Commonwealth Games program. The competition was held on 4 August 2022 at Sandwell Aquatics Centre in Birmingham.

== Format ==
The competition will be held in two rounds:

- Preliminary round: All divers perform five dives; the top 12 divers advance to the final.
- Final: The 12 divers perform five dives; the preliminary round scores are erased and the top three divers win the gold, silver and bronze medals accordingly.

== Schedule ==
All times are British Summer Time (UTC+1).

Date	Start	Round
4 August	14:33	Preliminary
4 August	19:34	Finals

== Results ==
Green denotes finalists

Rank	Diver	Preliminary		Final	
Rank	Diver	Points	Rank	Points	Rank
1st place, gold medalist(s)	Andrea Spendolini-Sirieix (ENG)	360.00	1	357.50	1
2nd place, silver medalist(s)	Lois Toulson (ENG)	332.00	2	337.30	2
3rd place, bronze medalist(s)	Caeli McKay (CAN)	302.70	4	317.50	3
4	Eden Cheng (ENG)	280.00	8	302.85	4
5	Emily Meaney (AUS)	257.00	12	299.35	5
6	Celina Toth (CAN)	297.30	5	298.40	6
7	Emily Boyd (AUS)	304.30	3	296.60	7
8	Nikita Hains (AUS)	259.50	11	291.10	8
9	Gemma McArthur (SCO)	290.55	6	290.90	9
10	Tanya Watson (NIR)	266.55	10	282.25	10
11	Pandelela Rinong (MAS)	283.50	7	260.90	11
12	Lucy Hawkins (WAL)	274.70	9	257.95	12
13	Renée Batalla (CAN)	250.05	13	did not advance	
14	Mikali Dawson (NZL)	181.85	14	did not advance	
