= Diving at the 2018 European Aquatics Championships – Team =

Team at the 2018 European Aquatics Championships
- Venue: Royal Commonwealth Pool
- Dates: 6 August
- Competitors: 14 from 7 nations
- Teams: 7
- Winning points: 355.90

Medalists
| gold medal | Oleh Kolodiy; Sofiia Lyskun | Ukraine |
| silver medal | Lou Massenberg; Maria Kurjo | Germany |
| bronze medal | Yulia Timoshinina; Evgeny Kuznetsov | Russia |

The Team competition of the 2018 European Aquatics Championships was held on 6 August 2018.

== Results ==
The final was started at 12:00.

| Rank | Nation | Divers | Points | | | | | | |
| Rank | Nation | Divers | T1 | T2 | T3 | T4 | T5 | T6 | Total |
|---|---|---|---|---|---|---|---|---|---|
| 1st place, gold medalist(s) | Ukraine | Oleh Kolodiy; Sofiia Lyskun | 47.00 | 46.00 | 68.00 | 57.40 | 70.30 | 67.20 | 355.90 |
| 2nd place, silver medalist(s) | Germany | Lou Massenberg; Maria Kurjo | 39.00 | 45.00 | 68.80 | 67.50 | 67.20 | 65.10 | 352.60 |
| 3rd place, bronze medalist(s) | Russia | Yulia Timoshinina; Evgeny Kuznetsov | 43.00 | 73.50 | 63.55 | 89.30 | 35.20 | 45.00 | 349.55 |
| 4 | Great Britain | James Heatly; Robyn Birch | 50.00 | 41.00 | 76.50 | 45.00 | 68.25 | 62.40 | 343.15 |
| 5 | Italy | Noemi Batki; Giovanni Tocci | 39.00 | 48.00 | 56.00 | 74.80 | 42.00 | 64.60 | 324.40 |
| 6 | Belarus | Vadim Kaptur; Alena Khamulkina | 47.00 | 42.00 | 58.50 | 68.80 | 55.50 | 45.90 | 317.70 |
| 7 | Sweden | Ellen Ek; Vinko Paradzik | 37.00 | 38.00 | 54.60 | 43.20 | 55.50 | 42.00 | 270.30 |
