= Diving at the 2024 European Aquatics Championships – Women's 10 m platform =

Women's 10 m platform at the 2024 European Aquatics Championships
- Venue: Serbian Institute for Sports and Sports Medicine
- Dates: 19 June
- Competitors: 16 from 12 nations
- Winning points: 287.90

Medalists
gold medal	Ana Carvajal	Spain
silver medal	Emily Hallifax	France
silver medal	Sofiia Lyskun	Ukraine

The Women's 10 m platform competition of the 2024 European Aquatics Championships was held on 19 June 2024.

== Results ==
The preliminary round was started at 10:00. The final was held at 17:00.

Green denotes finalists

Rank	Diver	Nationality	Preliminary		Final	
Rank	Diver	Nationality	Points	Rank	Points	Rank
1st place, gold medalist(s)	Ana Carvajal	Spain	224.95	7	287.90	1
2nd place, silver medalist(s)	Emily Hallifax	France	219.75	8	278.10	2
2nd place, silver medalist(s)	Sofiia Lyskun	Ukraine	286.25	2	278.10	3
4	Valeria Antolino	Spain	281.70	3	275.05	4
5	Karina Hlyzhina	Ukraine	269.70	4	269.60	5
6	Jade Gillet	France	2166.70	10	264.60	6
7	Džeja Delanija Patrika	Latvia	240.20	6	256.70	7
8	Ciara McGing	Ireland	254.40	5	250.40	8
9	Else Praasterink	Netherlands	287.30	1	247.90	9
10	Carolina Coordes	Germany	214.00	11	233.85	10
11	Ioana-Andreea Carcu	Romania	218.20	9	227.50	11
12	Amanda Lundin	Sweden	203.35	12	199.95	12
13	Nicoleta-Angelica Muscalu	Romania	194.40	13	Did not advance	
14	Luisa Arco	Portugal	182.30	14	Did not advance	
15	Stavroula Chalemou	Greece	180.65	15	Did not advance	
16	Alisa Zakaryan	Armenia	143.95	16	Did not advance	
