= Kyle Kothari =

British diver (born 1998)

Personal information
- Born: 26 January 1998 (age 28) Harrow, London, England

Sport
- Country: (United Kingdom) Great Britain, England
- Sport: Diving
- Events: 10 m platform, 10 m synchro, 10 m mixed synchro
- Club: Dive London
Medal record
Men's diving
Representing Great Britain
European Championships
Gold medal – first place	2022 Rome	10 m mixed synchro
Gold medal – first place	2022 Rome	10 m synchro
FINA Diving Grand Prix
Silver medal – second place	2017 Bolzano	10 m platform
Silver medal – second place	2017 Singapore	3 m mixed synchro
Silver medal – second place	2017 Singapore	10 m mixed synchro
Silver medal – second place	2018 Rostock	10 m synchro
Silver medal – second place	2022 Calgary	10 m synchro
Bronze medal – third place	2017 Kuala Lumpur	10 m platform
Bronze medal – third place	2017 Singapore	10 m platform
Representing England
Commonwealth Games
Silver medal – second place	2022 Birmingham	10 m mixed synchro

Kyle Kothari (/kəˈtɑːri/ kə-TAR-ee; born 26 January 1998) is an English diver representing Great Britain and England in competition. At the 2022 Commonwealth Games, he won a silver medal in the 10 metre mixed synchronised platform, and placed fourth in the 10 metre synchronised platform. He is a 2022 European champion in the 10 metre mixed synchronised platform and the 10 metre synchronised platform. Kyle competed at the Paris 2024 Olympics in the 10 metre platform.

== Career ==
At the 2018 British National Diving Championships, held in January in Plymouth, Kothari and his partner Matty Lee won the national title and gold medal in the 10 metre synchronised platform with a score of 406.17 points.

=== 2022 ===
Leading up to the 2022 Commonwealth Games, as part of the 2022 FINA Diving Grand Prix held in June in Calgary, Canada, Kothari won the silver medal in the 10 metre synchronised platform with partner Ben Cutmore, achieving a final mark of 374.58 points.

==== 2022 Commonwealth Games ====
In early August, at the 2022 Commonwealth Games held in Birmingham, Kothari and his partner Ben Cutmore placed fourth in the 10 metre synchronised platform on day two of diving competition with a score of 391.35 points, finishing 21.21 points behind the bronze medalists Cassiel Rousseau and Domonic Bedggood of Australia. Three days later, he won a silver medal in the 10 metre mixed synchronised platform, scoring a total of 318.54 points with his partner Lois Toulson to finish behind the gold medal duo, also of England. Their silver medal contributed to a record number of 15 total medals won by divers representing England at a single Commonwealth Games.

==== 2022 European Aquatics Championships ====
Kothari entered to compete in two events at the 2022 European Aquatics Championships, held in mid-August in Rome, Italy, the team event and the 10 metre mixed synchronised platform. On the first day of diving, both he and Lois Toulson were substituted out and two other divers representing Great Britain were substituted in for the team event. In the 10 metre mixed synchronised platform, he and Louis Toulson won the gold medal with a score of 300.78 points, finishing over two points ahead of the team that won the silver medal from Ukraine. Three days later, in the 10 metre synchronised platform, he achieved another narrow gold medal-victory, this time scoring 2.46 points ahead of the silver medalists from Ukraine with a final score of 390.48 points achieved with partner Ben Cutmore.

=== 2023 ===
In February 2023, at the year's British National Diving Cup, Kothari won a gold medal in the men's 10 metre synchronised platform event with Ben Cutmore, achieving a final mark of 402.99 points. In May 2023, he won the 10m platform title at the British Diving Championships.

2024

Kyle competed in the Paris 2024 Olympics in the 10m platform on 10 August 2024 and came 11th.

== International championships ==
Meet	10 metre synchronised	10 metre mixed synchronised
CG 2022	4th (391.35)	(silver) (318.54)
EC 2022	(gold) (390.48)	(gold) (300.78)

== Personal life ==
Kyle was born in Harrow, north London, into a family of Gujarati heritage.

Kyle graduated from LSE with a degree in BSc Geography with Economics in 2019. He worked at JP Morgan as an analyst for seven months.
