= Diving at the 2022 Commonwealth Games – Mixed synchronised 10 metre platform =

Mixed synchronised 10 metre platform at the 2022 Commonwealth Games
- Venue: Sandwell Aquatics Centre
- Date: 8 August
- Competitors: 16 from 6 nations
- Winning score: 333.06

Medalists
gold medal	Noah Williams; Andrea Spendolini-Sirieix	England
silver medal	Kyle Kothari; Lois Toulson	England
bronze medal	Cassiel Rousseau; Emily Boyd	Australia

The mixed synchronised 10 metre platform is part of the 2022 Commonwealth Games diving program. The competition will be held on 8 August 2022 at Sandwell Aquatics Centre in Birmingham, England.

This is the inaugural edition of the event. Nations can send more than one team to a synchronised event. Australia and hosts England have entered two teams in this event.

== Schedule ==
All times are BST (UTC+1)

Date	Time	Round
8 August 2022	11:19	Finals

== Format ==
A single round will be held, with each team making five dives. Eleven judges score each dive: three for each diver, and five for synchronisation. Only the middle score counts for each diver, with the middle three counting for synchronisation. These five scores are averaged, multiplied by 3, and multiplied by the dive's degree of difficulty to give a total dive score. The scores for each of the five dives are then aggregated to give a final score.

== Result ==
The initial field for the event was published on 22 July 2022:

Rank	Nation	Dives					Total
Rank	Nation	1	2	3	4	5	Total
1st place, gold medalist(s)	England; Noah Williams; Andrea Spendolini-Sirieix	49.80	52.80	71.10	84.48	74.88	333.06
2nd place, silver medalist(s)	England; Kyle Kothari; Lois Toulson	48.00	49.80	72.90	71.04	76.80	318.54
3rd place, bronze medalist(s)	Australia; Cassiel Rousseau; Emily Boyd	49.20	52.20	59.40	77.76	71.04	309.60
4	Malaysia; Jellson Jabillin; Pandelela Pamg	51.60	45.60	69.30	67.20	68.16	302.82
5	Canada; Rylan Wiens; Celina Toth	48.60	48.60	63.36	63.90	72.00	296.46
6	Australia; Domonic Bedggood; Melissa Wu	48.00	46.80	61.20	66.24	72.96	295.20
7	Scotland; Angus Menmuir; Gemma McArthur	44.40	45.00	63.90	67.20	69.12	289.62
8	Wales; Aidan Heslop; Ruby Thorne	46.80	44.40	67.32	57.60	68.16	284.28
