= 2023 European Diving Championships – Mixed synchronized 10 metre platform =

Mixed synchronized 10 metre platform at the 2023 European Diving Championships
- Venue: Rzeszów Diving Arena
- Date: 24 June
- Competitors: 10 from 5 nations
- Teams: 5
- Winning points: 322.68

Medalists
gold medal	Kirill Boliukh; Kseniya Baylo	Ukraine
silver medal	Alexander Lube; Elena Wassen	Germany
bronze medal	Eduard Timbretti Gugiu; Sarah Jodoin Di Maria	Italy

The mixed synchronized 10 metre platform event at the 2023 European Diving Championships was held on 24 June 2023.

== Results ==
The final was held at 15:00.

Rank	Nation	Divers	D1	D2	D3	D4	D5	Total
1st place, gold medalist(s)	Ukraine	Kirill Boliukh; Kseniya Baylo	52.80	49.80	68.40	72.00	79.68	322.68
2nd place, silver medalist(s)	Germany	Alexander Lube; Elena Wassen	48.00	46.80	68.16	70.20	72.96	306.12
3rd place, bronze medalist(s)	Italy	Eduard Timbretti Gugiu; Sarah Jodoin Di Maria	45.60	44.40	69.30	53.76	70.08	283.14
4	Spain	Carlos Camacho; Valeria Antolino	45.60	41.40	62.10	57.60	68.16	274.86
5	Great Britain	Noah Penman; Maisie Bond	44.40	41.40	61.20	50.88	67.20	265.08
