= Sofia Esman =

Ukrainian diver (born 2008)

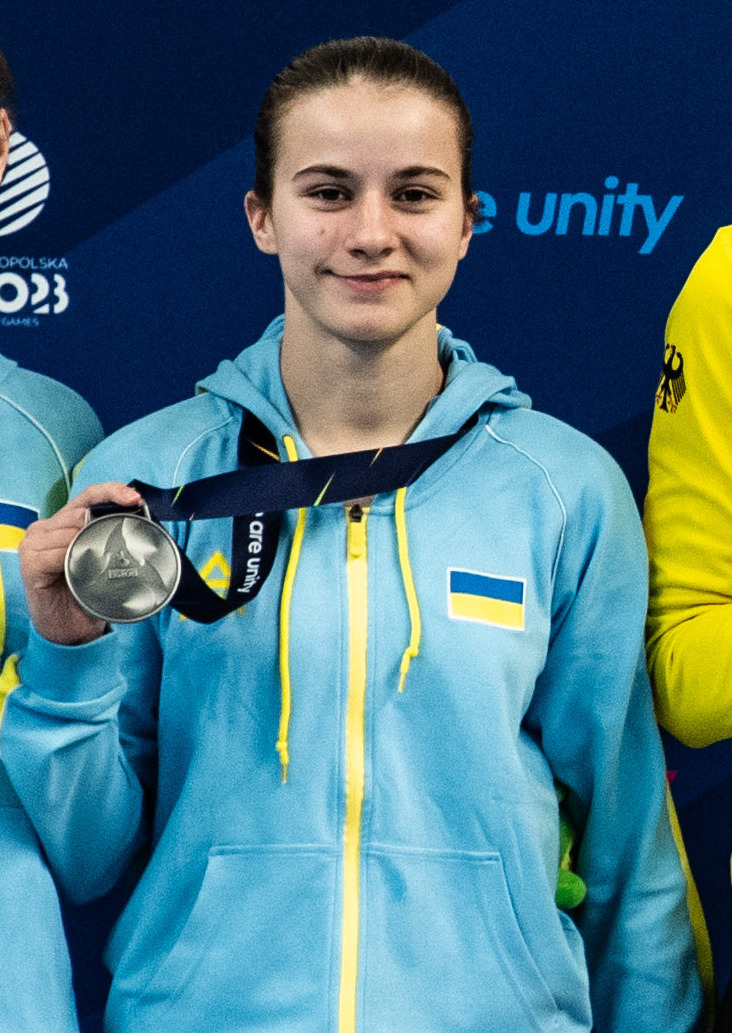
- Esman at the 2023 European Games

Personal information
- Native name: Софія Есман
- Full name: Sofia Esman
- Citizenship: Ukrainian
- Born: 12 March 2008 (age 18)

Sport
- Country: Ukraine
- Sport: Diving
Medal record
Women's diving
Representing Ukraine
European Games
Silver medal – second place	2023 Kraków–Małopolska	10 m synchro
European Diving Championships
Silver medal – second place	2023 Rzeszów	10 m synchro
European Junior Diving Championships
Bronze medal – third place	2022 Otopeni	3 m synchro

Sofia Esman (Ukrainian: Софія Есман; born 12 March 2008) is a Ukrainian diver.

== Career ==
In 2022, Esman and Sofiia Ivanova won the bronze medal in the 3 m synchronized platform event at the 2022 European Junior Swimming Championships, held in Otopeni, Romania.

At the 2023 European Games, held in Kraków, Sofia Esman and Kseniya Baylo won a silver medal in the 10 m synchronized platform event.

Also they have competed at the 2023 World Aquatics Championships, held in Fukuoka, Japan in 10 m synchronized platform event without reaching a medal.
