= Fencing at the 2023 European Games – Men's team foil =

Men's team foil at the 2023 European Games
- Venue: Tauron Arena Kraków
- Location: Kraków, Poland
- Date: 29 June
- Competitors: 70 from 19 nations
- Teams: 19

Medalists
gold medal	Alessio Foconi; Daniele Garozzo; Filippo Macchi; Tommaso Marini	Italy
silver medal	Alexandre Ediri; Enzo Lefort; Maxime Pauty; Rafael Savin	France
bronze medal	Paul Luca Faul; Alexander Kahl; Luis Klein; Laurenz Rieger	Germany

The Men's team foil competition at the 2023 European Games in Kraków was held on 29 June 2023.

== Results ==
=== Main bracket ===
Round of 32
Greece	15
Denmark	45
Moldova	20
Georgia	45
Croatia	45
Slovakia	33

Round of 16
Italy	45
Denmark	31
Austria	31
Hungary	45
Great Britain	45
Czech Republic	44
Netherlands	40
Ukraine	45
Poland	45
Georgia	27
Israel	32
Germany	45
Belgium	45
Spain	41
Croatia	29
France	45

Quarterfinals
Italy	45
Hungary	33
Great Britain	45
Ukraine	37
Poland	44
Germany	45
Belgium	38
France	45

Semifinals
Italy	45
Great Britain	29
Germany	43
France	45

Final
Italy	45
France	39
Third place
Great Britain	43
Germany	45

=== 5–8th place bracket ===
5–8th place semifinals
Hungary	45
Ukraine	30
Poland	45
Belgium	25

Fifth place
Hungary	29
Poland	45
Seventh place
Ukraine	39
Belgium	45

=== 9–16th place bracket ===
9–16th place quarterfinals
Denmark	45
Austria	39
Czech Republic	45
Netherlands	32
Georgia	39
Israel	45
Spain	39
Croatia	45

9–12th place semifinals
Denmark	45
Czech Republic	42
Israel	45
Croatia	40

Ninth place
Denmark	40
Israel	45
Eleventh place
Czech Republic	45
Croatia	35

=== 13–16th place bracket ===
13–16th place semifinals
Austria	45
Netherlands	32
Georgia	35
Spain	45

13th place
Austria	35
Spain	45
15th place
Netherlands	45
Georgia	36

== Final ranking ==
Rank	Team	Rank	Team	Rank	Team	Rank	Team
1st place, gold medalist(s)	Italy; Alessio Foconi; Daniele Garozzo; Filippo Macchi; Tommaso Marini	6	Hungary; Dániel Dósa; András Németh; Gergő Szemes; Gergely Tóth	11	Croatia; Petar Fileš; Ivan Komšić; Borna Špoljar	16	Georgia; Luka Gaganidze; Lasha Galuashvili; Archil Ugulava
2nd place, silver medalist(s)	France; Alexandre Ediri; Enzo Lefort; Maxime Pauty; Rafael Savin	7	Belgium; Stef De Greef; Oscar Geudvert; Mathieu Nijs; Stef Van Campenhout	12	Czech Republic; Alexander Choupenitch; Lev Holý; Jan Krejčík; Marek Totušek	17	Greece; Nikolaos Kontochristopoulos; Georgios Manolikas; Apostolos Soulios; Artemios Tzovanis
3rd place, bronze medalist(s)	Germany; Paul Luca Faul; Alexander Kahl; Luis Klein; Laurenz Rieger	8	Ukraine; Rostyslav Hertsyk; Danyil Hoida; Andrii Pogrebniak; Klod Yunes	13	Spain; Ignacio Breteau; Roger García-Alzórriz; Carlos Llavador; Esteban Peressini	18	Slovakia; Árpád Fazekas; Akos Pirk; Cedrik Serri
4	Great Britain; Kristjan Archer; Jaimie Cook; James Davis; Marcus Mepstead	9	Israel; Ori Finsterbush; Raz Goren; Maor Hatoel; Roey Rosenfeld	14	Austria; Maximilian Ettelt; Moritz Lechner; Johannes Poscharnig; Tobias Reichetzer	19	Moldova; Nikita Cecet; Nikitas Gherman; Alex Postovan; Eugeniu Vadaniuc
5	Poland; Leszek Rajski; Andrzej Rządkowski; Michał Siess; Adrian Wojtkowiak	10	Denmark; Christopher Horn Nielsen; Jonas Karlsen; Jonas Winterberg-Poulsen	15	Netherlands; Teun Jans-Köhneke; Dirk Jan van Egmond; Elisha Yuno; Axel Zoons		
