= Alexandra Ehler =

German fencer

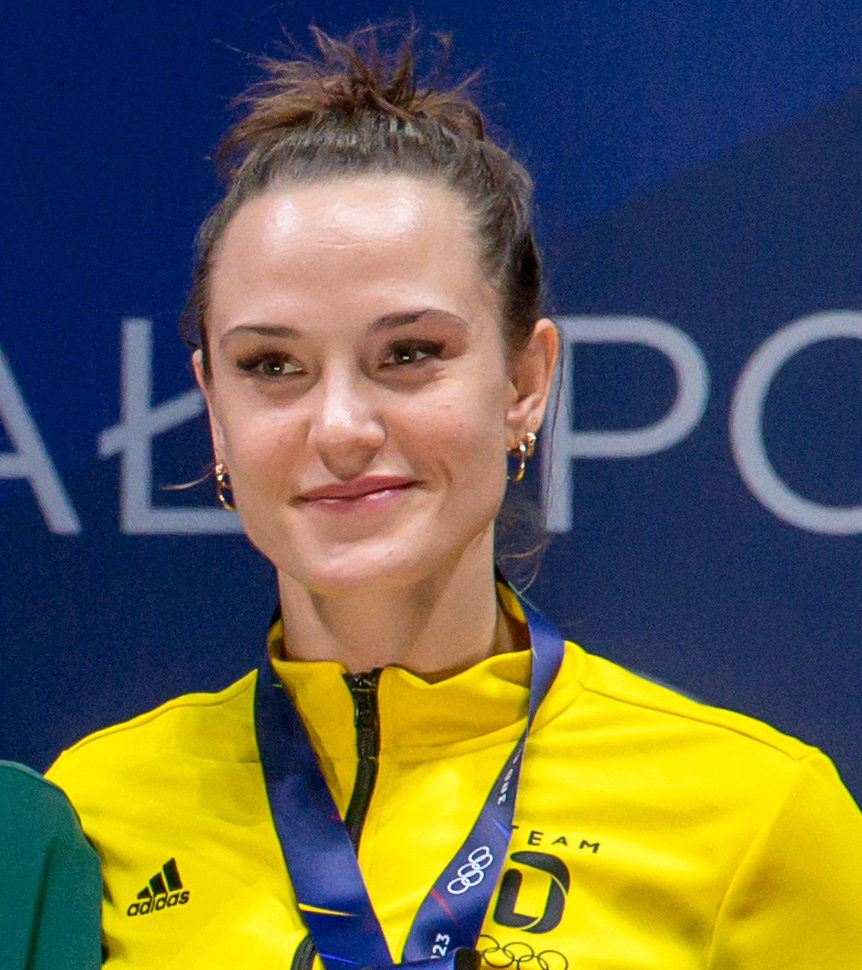
- Ehler in 2023

Sport
- Country: Germany
- Sport: Fencing
Medal record
Representing Germany
Women's fencing
European Games
| Bronze medal – third place | 2023 Kraków | Individual |
European Championships
| Silver medal – second place | 2026 Antony | Individual |

Alexandra Ehler is a German fencer. She competed at the 2023 European Games, winning the bronze medal in the women's épée event. She also competed at the 2026 European Fencing Championships, winning the silver medal in the same event.
