= Emily Boyd (diver) =

Australian diver (born 1995)

Personal information
- Nationality: Australian
- Born: 14 March 1995 (age 31) Warrington, England

Sport
- Sport: Diving
- Event: 10 metre springboard
Medal record
Women's diving
Representing Australia
Commonwealth Games
Bronze medal – third place	2022 Birmingham	10 m mixed synchro

Emily Boyd (born 12 March 1995) is an Australian diver who competes in the 3m and 10m individual events, as well as the 10m synchronised. She is a Commonwealth bronze medallist in the mixed synchronised 10 m platform competing alongside Cassiel Rousseau.

== Early life ==
Boyd was born in Warrington, England. At the age of 12 years, her family moved to Australia settling in Brisbane, Queensland. Boyd started out as gymnast whilst in England but was later attracted to diving after watching a friend's training session. After moving to Australia, she went to a school holiday clinic at Chandler and she got hooked up to diving fully.

== Career ==
She was part of the Australian team for the 2012 FINA World Junior Championships, before making the senior titles in Barcelona the following year where she finished 4th in the 10m platform synchronised with Lara Tarvit.

Soon afterwards, she announced she would be competing for Great Britain, before returning to the Australian team in 2017.

In June 2022, she was named in the Australian diving team for the 2022 Commonwealth Games. Competing along with Cassiel Rousseau, the duo placed third and won the bronze medal in the mixed synchronised 10 m platform at the 2022 Commonwealth Games in Birmingham.

Boyd is member of the Diving Queensland team.

== Personal life ==
In a short interview with FINA, Boyd mentioned that she had suffered a fractured eye socket, achilles’ tendon rupture, a seizure whilst in a supermarket in the past was proud to have overcome all these prior to making her debut Commonwealth Games appearance. She also has depression.
