= Celine van Duijn =

Dutch diver (born 1992)

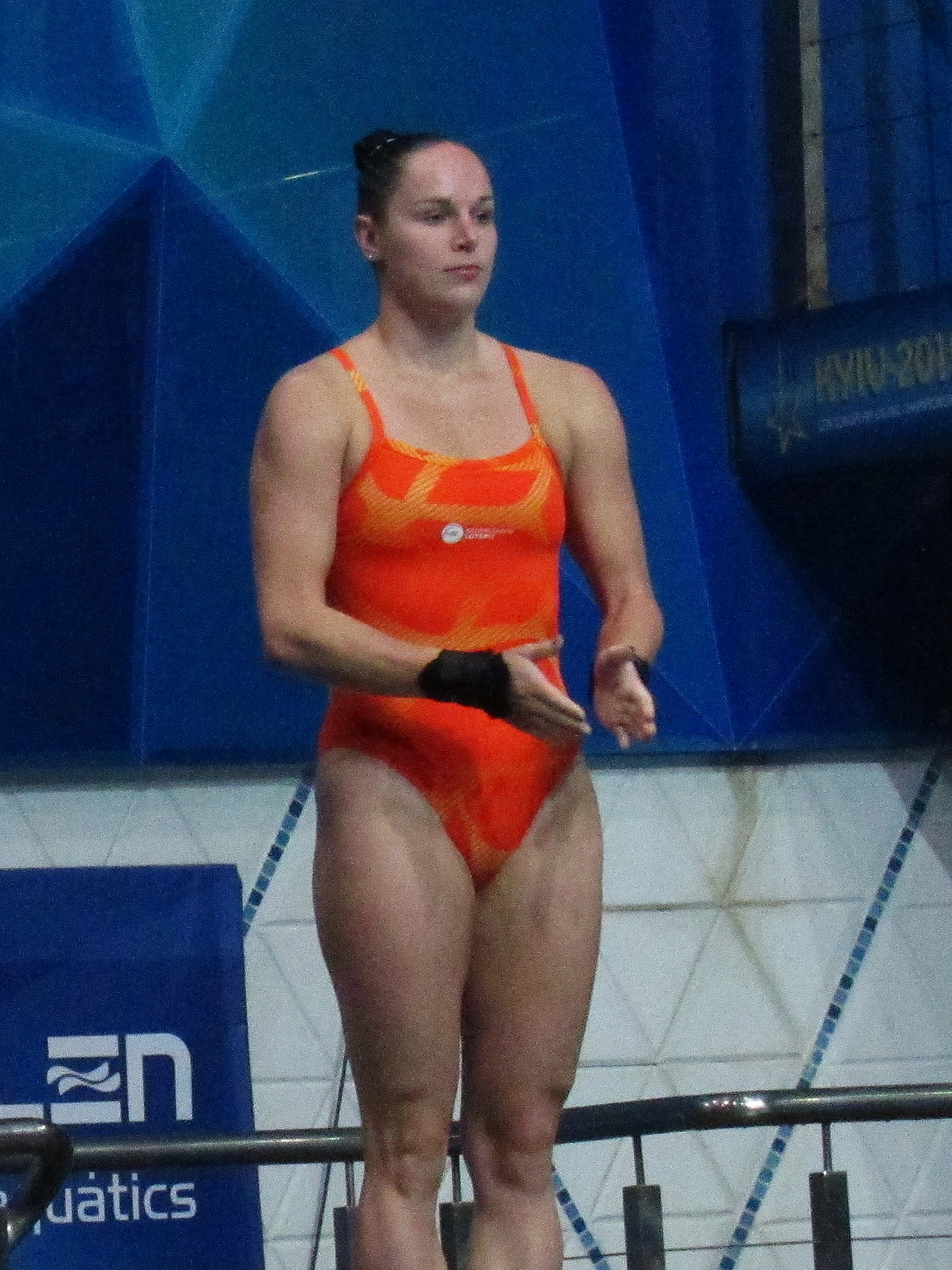

Personal information
- Nationality: Dutch
- Born: 4 November 1992 (age 33) Amersfoort, Netherlands
- Height: 1.71 m (5 ft 7 in)

Sport
- Country: Netherlands
- Sport: Diving
Medal record
European Championships
Gold medal – first place	2018 Glasgow	10 m platform
European Diving Championships
Silver medal – second place	2019 Kyiv	10 m platform

Celine van Duijn (born 4 November 1992) is a Dutch diver. She competed in the women's 10 m platform event at the 2018 European Aquatics Championships, winning the gold medal.

Van Duijn competed at the 2013, 2015 and 2017 World Aquatics Championships. At the 2018 FINA Diving World Cup she finished 4th together with Inge Jansen at the women's Synchronised 3m Springboard event.
