= Ana Carvajal San Miguel =

Spanish diver (born 2006)

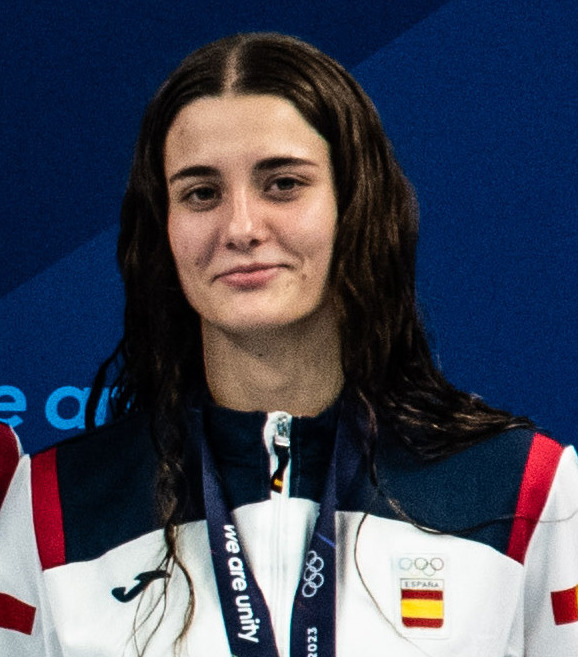

Personal information
- Born: Ana Carvajal San Miguel; 2006 (age 19–20) Villanueva de la Cañada, Madrid, Spain

Sport
- Country: Spain
- Sport: Diving
- Event: 10 metre platform
Medal record
Women's diving
Representing Spain
European Championships
Gold medal – first place	2024 Belgrade	10 m platform
Silver medal – second place	2024 Belgrade	10 m synchro
Bronze medal – third place	2026 Paris	10 m mixed synchro
European Diving Championships
Gold medal – first place	2025 Antalya	10 m synchro

Ana Carvajal San Miguel (born 2006) is a Spanish diver specialising in the 10 metre platform. She represented Spain at the 2024 Summer Olympics in Paris and is the 2024 European champion in the women's 10 metre platform; in 2025 she added a second European title in the 10 metre synchronised platform together with Valeria Antolino.

== Early life ==
Carvajal was born in 2006 in Villanueva de la Cañada, a municipality in the western part of the Community of Madrid. Her first contact with the pool came as a young girl, initially swimming before becoming interested in diving after seeing older athletes use the springboard. Around the age of seven or eight she went through a brief period of panic in the pool, but quickly recovered and continued in the sport, eventually specialising in the 10 metre platform.

== Career ==
=== Junior years and senior debut ===
Carvajal started competing internationally as a junior in 2021. At the 2022 European Junior Aquatics Championships, held in Bucharest, she took a silver medal in the women's 10 metre platform.

At the 2023 World Aquatics Championships in Fukuoka in July 2023, still of junior age, Carvajal unexpectedly reached the final of the women's 10 metre platform and in doing so secured an Olympic quota place for Spain in the event, the first Spanish diving berth for Paris 2024.

=== 2024: European gold and Paris Olympics ===
At the 2024 European Aquatics Championships, held in Belgrade in June 2024, Carvajal was crowned European champion in the women's 10 metre platform on 19 June 2024 with a score of 287.90 points. Three days later she added a silver medal in the women's 10 metre synchronised platform alongside Valeria Antolino, with whom she would go on to form Spain's regular pairing on the platform.

Carvajal learned that she would compete at the 2024 Summer Olympics only after the final scores from Fukuoka were confirmed; the news, which she received without expecting to qualify on her first attempt, took her by surprise and accelerated the long-term plan of her coaching team. Speaking before the Games, the diver played down medal expectations, saying that her main aim was to gain experience for the Los Angeles 2028 cycle: "Con estar allí ya soy feliz" ("Just being there makes me happy"). She also described a difficult run-up to Paris combining diving training with the Spanish Selectividad-track university-entrance studies and a finger injury that kept her out for about a month. In a separate interview she set the technical objective of consolidating an inward-twisting dive (tirabuzón) as the additional element she still needed in her programme.

At the Paris Olympics on 5 August 2024, Carvajal qualified for the semifinal by finishing twelfth in the preliminary round with 285.60 points. In the semifinal later that day she finished fourteenth, falling short of the twelve-woman final by two places.

=== 2025–2026 ===
At the 2025 European Diving Championships in Antalya, Turkey, Carvajal and Antolino won the gold medal in the women's 10 metre synchronised platform on 28 May 2025 with 305.82 points, defeating the defending champions Kseniia Bailo and Sofiia Lyskun of Ukraine by almost twenty points and reversing the order of the previous year's Belgrade final.

In May 2026 she competed at the World Aquatics Diving World Cup Super Final, held at the Water Cube in Beijing; under the head-to-head format introduced for the event, she was eliminated in the first round of the women's 10 metre platform.
