= Valeriia Liulko =

Ukrainian diver (born 1999)

Personal information
- Native name: Валерія Люлько
- Citizenship: Ukraine
- Born: 18 September 1999 (age 26) Luhansk, Ukraine

Sport
- Sport: Diving
Medal record
Representing Ukraine
Diving
European Diving Championships
Bronze medal – third place	Kyiv 2017	10m synchro

Valeriia Liulko (Ukrainian: Валерія Люлько, born September 18, 1999, Luhansk) is a Ukrainian diver, medalist of the European Championships. She won a bronze medal in the 10-meter platform synchro diving at the 2017 European Diving Championships in Kyiv. Her partner was Sofiia Lyskun.
