= Lois Toulson =

British diver (born 1999)

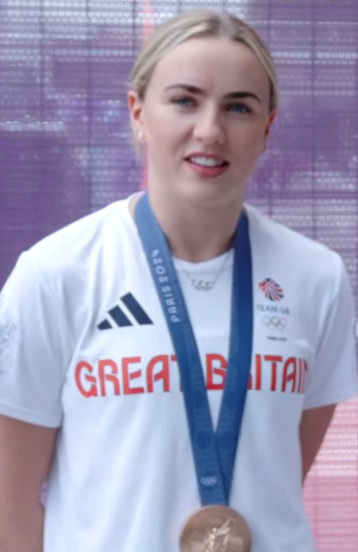
- Toulson in 2024

Personal information
- Full name: Lois Mae Toulson
- Born: 26 September 1999 (age 26) Huddersfield, England
- Height: 1.62 m (5 ft 4 in)
- Weight: 54 kg (119 lb)

Sport
- Country: Great Britain; England
- Sport: Diving
Medal record
Women's diving
Representing Great Britain
Olympic Games
Bronze medal – third place	2024 Paris	10 m synchro
World Championships
Silver medal – second place	2017 Budapest	10 m mixed synchro
Silver medal – second place	2023 Fukuoka	10 m synchro
Bronze medal – third place	2024 Doha	10 m synchro
European Games
Gold medal – first place	2015 Baku	10 m platform
European Championships
Gold medal – first place	2018 Glasgow	10 m synchro
Gold medal – first place	2022 Rome	10 m mixed synchro
Gold medal – first place	2022 Rome	10 m synchro
Gold medal – first place	2026 Paris	10 m synchro
Silver medal – second place	2018 Glasgow	10 m mixed synchro
Silver medal – second place	2020 Budapest	10 m synchro
European Diving Championships
Gold medal – first place	2017 Kyiv	10 m platform
Gold medal – first place	2017 Kyiv	10 m mixed synchro
FINA Diving World Cup
Silver medal – second place	2021 Tokyo	10 m synchro
Representing England
Commonwealth Games
Silver medal – second place	2022 Birmingham	10 m platform
Silver medal – second place	2022 Birmingham	10 m mixed synchro
Bronze medal – third place	2018 Gold Coast	10 m platform

Lois Mae Toulson (born 26 September 1999) is a British diver. A specialist in the 10 metre platform, she won the gold medal at the inaugural European Games in 2015, and the senior European title in 2017. She competed in the women's synchronized ten metre platform event at the 2016 Summer Olympics with Tonia Couch and she won bronze at the 2024 Summer Olympics in same category with Andrea Spendolini-Sirieix. She won silver in mixed 10m platform synchro at the 2017 World Aquatics Championships with Matty Lee, and gold in the women's synchronized 10 metre platform at the 2018 European Aquatics Championships with Eden Cheng, at the 2022 European Championships with Andrea Spendolini-Sirieix, and at the 2026 European Championships with Maisie Bond.

== Early life ==
Toulson was raised in Cleckheaton. She attended Whitcliffe Mount School and Elliott Hudson College.

== Career ==
Having made her first senior international appearance at the 2015 European Championships. She also competed in the first European Games where she claimed gold; she closed her first senior season with individual gold and silver medals at FINA Grand Prix events in Singapore and Malaysia.

=== 2017 ===
At the 2017 European Diving Championships in Kyiv, Toulson won two golds, first in 10m platform, and in the mixed 10m platform synchro with diving partner Matty Lee.

At the 2017 World Aquatics Championships, Toulson and Lee won silver in the 10m mixed synchro.

=== 2018 ===
At the 2018 British Diving Championships, Toulson won the women's 10m platform event, scoring 336.90 points.

At the 2018 European Championships in Glasgow/Edinburgh, Toulson partnered with Eden Cheng in the women's 10 metre synchro platform and won a gold medal. Toulson also partnered with Matty Lee to win silver in the mixed synchronised 10m platform.

=== 2021 ===
At the 2021 FINA Diving World Cup held in Japan as an official test event for the 2020 Tokyo Olympics, Toulson and Cheng won silver in synchronised 10m platform, thereby securing their qualification to the Olympics. They also won silver in Synchronised 10m platform two weeks later at the European Championships. At the 2020 Olympics, the pair finished seventh in the synchronized 10 metre platform after a poor start.

=== 2022 ===
She competed at the 2022 Commonwealth Games where she won silver medals in the women's 10 metre platform event and the mixed synchronised 10 metre platform event alongside Kyle Kothari.

=== 2024 ===
Alongside Andrea Spendolini-Sirieix, Toulson won a bronze medal in the synchronised 10 metre platform event at the Paris Olympics but failed to make the individual 10 metre platform final.

== Personal life ==
Toulson has been in a relationship with fellow Team GB diver Jack Laugher since 2017.
