= Sofiya Lyskun =

Russian diver (born 2002)

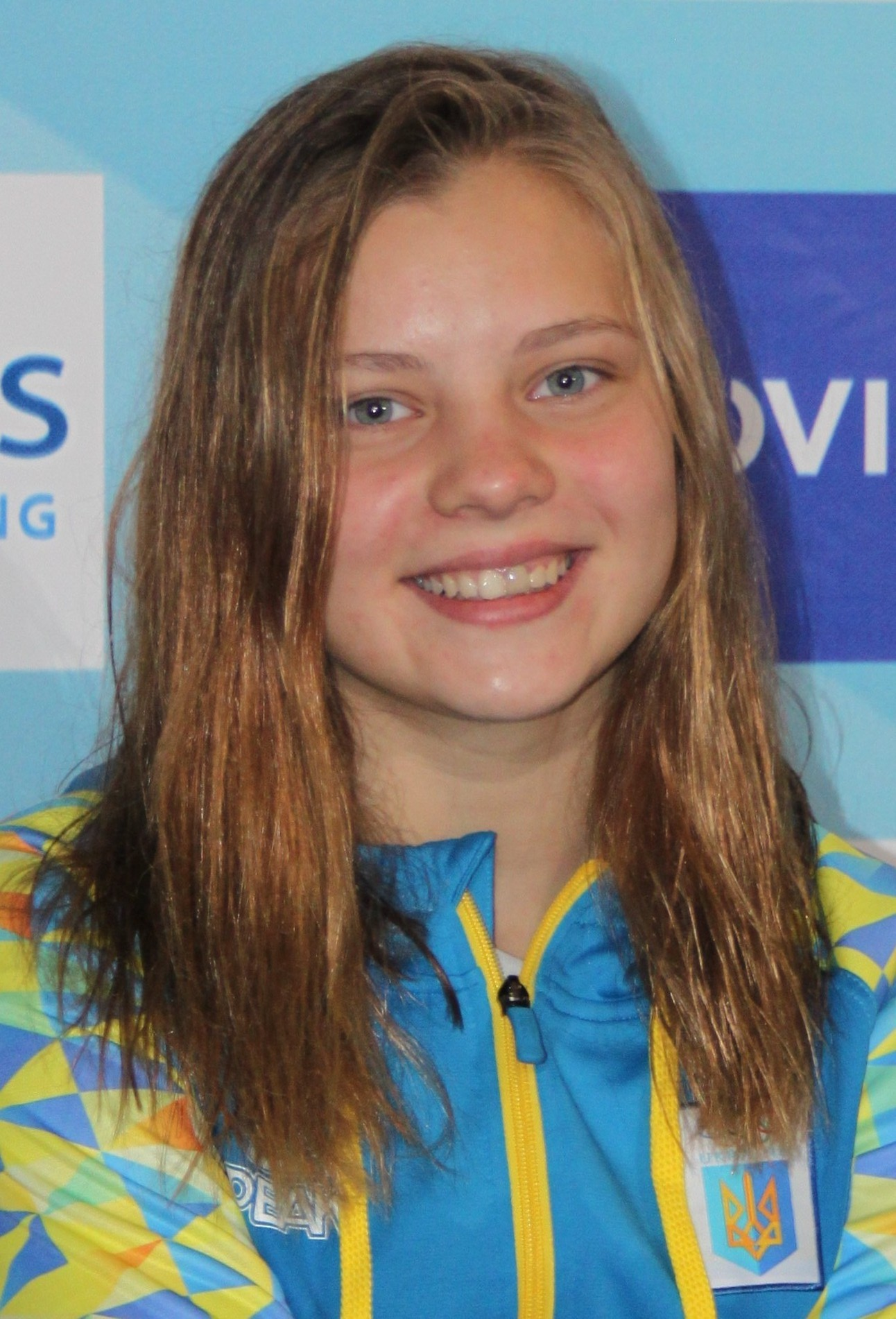
- Lyskun in 2017

Personal information
- Native name: Софія Лискун
- Citizenship: Ukraine; Russia (since 2025)
- Born: 7 February 2002 (age 24) Luhansk, Ukraine

Sport
- Sport: Diving
Medal record
Women's diving
Representing Ukraine
World Championships
Silver medal – second place	2022 Budapest	10 m mixed synchro
European Championships
Gold medal – first place	2018 Glasgow	Team
Gold medal – first place	2024 Belgrade	10 m synchro
Silver medal – second place	2022 Rome	10 m mixed synchro
Silver medal – second place	2022 Rome	10 m platform
Silver medal – second place	2022 Rome	10 m synchro
Silver medal – second place	2024 Belgrade	10 m platform
Bronze medal – third place	2020 Budapest	10 m synchro
European Diving Championships
Gold medal – first place	2019 Kyiv	10 m platform
Gold medal – first place	2025 Antalya	Mixed team
Silver medal – second place	2025 Antalya	10 m synchro
Bronze medal – third place	2017 Kyiv	10 m synchro
Summer Youth Olympics
Silver medal – second place	2018 Buenos Aires	10 m platform
Bronze medal – third place	2018 Buenos Aires	Mixed team
World Cup
Silver medal – second place	2018 Wuhan	Mixed team
Bronze medal – third place	2024 Xi'an	10 m synchro

Sofiya Valeriivna Lyskun (Ukrainian: Софія Валеріївна Лискун; Russian: София Валерьевна Лыскун, romanized: Sofiya Valeryevna Lyskun; born 7 February 2002) is a Ukrainian-born Russian diver, medalist of the European Championships.

In December 2025, she switched her allegiance from Ukraine to Russia, resulting in the Ukrainian Diving Federation stripping her of awards won during her time with the federation.

== Career ==
She won a bronze medal in 10-meter platform synchro diving (with Valeriia Liulko) at the 2017 European Diving Championships in Kyiv and a gold in the team event (with Oleh Kolodiy) at the multi-event 2018 European Championships in Glasgow.

At age 15, Lyskun won bronze at the 10 metres platform synchro event at the 2017 European Championships in Kyiv. In 2018, she performed a difficult dive (a back two-and-a-half somersaults and one-and-a-half twists in pike) for 10 metre board that earned her the highest final round mark of any diver and the gold medal.

She qualified to represent Ukraine at the 2020 Summer Olympics in the Women's 10 metre platform event.

In late 2025, she acquired Russian citizenship and announced her intention to compete for the Russian national team. The Ukrainian Diving Federation deemed her switch "categorically unacceptable" and stripped Lyskun of her titles. According to Reuters, "Lyskun told Russian outlet Izvestia that she made the decision to switch allegiance after realising she was no longer growing under her coaches in Ukraine and that they were 'all gymnasts or trampoline athletes'".
