= Tanya Watson =

British-born Irish diver

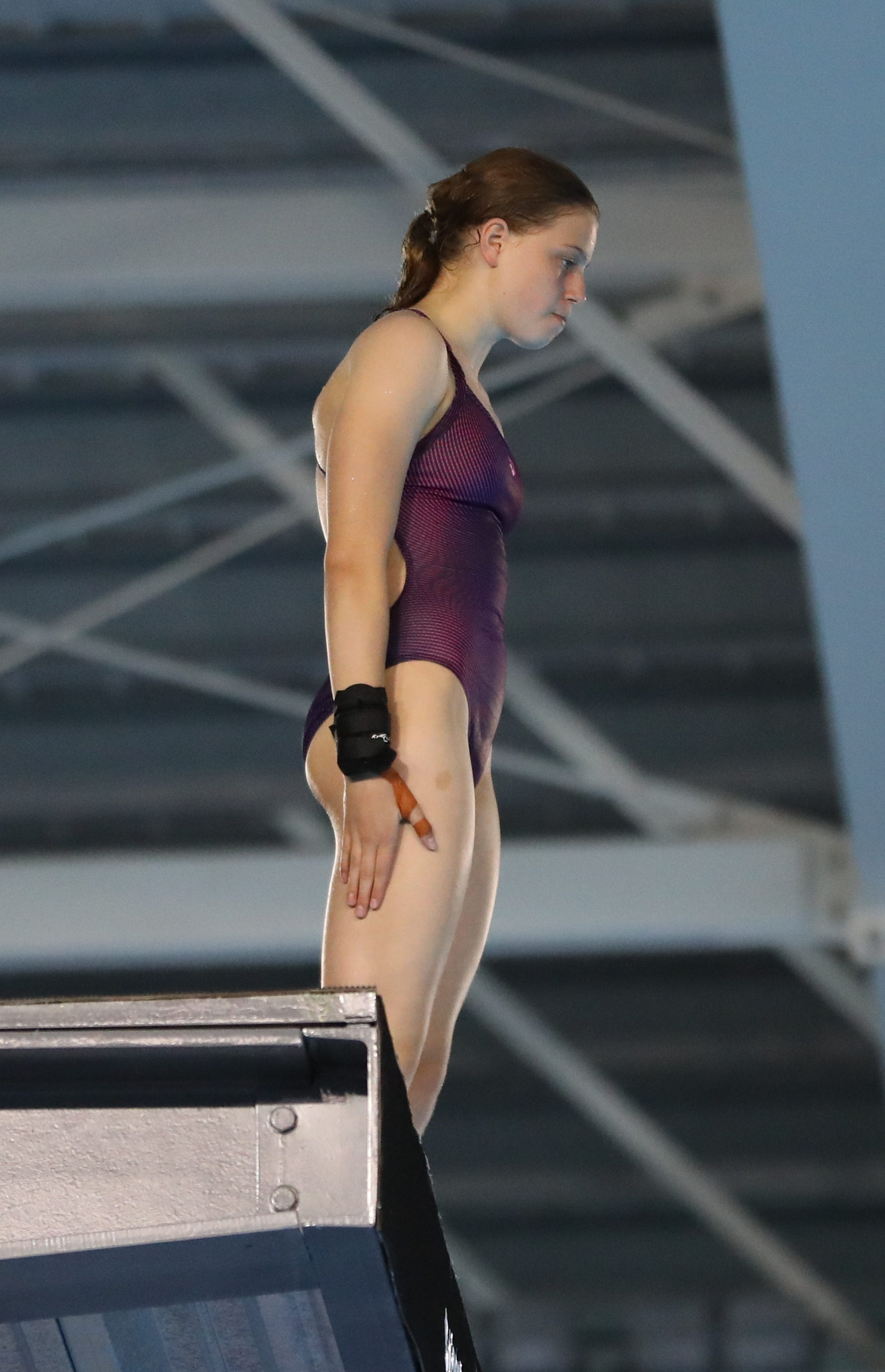
- Watson in 2018

Personal information
- Nationality: Irish
- Born: 24 December 2001 (age 23); Southampton, England

Sport
- Sport: Diving

Tanya Watson (born 24 December 2001) is a diver who represents Ireland and specialises in the 10m platform. She competed in the women's 10 metre platform event at the 2019 World Aquatics Championships. In 2021, she became the first Irish female diver to qualify for and compete in the Olympic Games. In 2022, she also became the first female diver to quality for and represent Team NI in the Commonwealth Games.

== Diving ==
Born in Southampton, England, Watson is eligible to represent Ireland through her grandmother, who was born in Derry in Northern Ireland. Watson participated in gymnastics as a child, before focusing on diving. In 2018, she was a finalist in both the European Junior Championships and the World Junior Championships, At the 2018 Summer Youth Olympics, she finished fifth in the Girls' 10m platform competition, and placed 29th at the 2019 World Aquatics Championships in the Women's 10 metre platform.

During the COVID-19 pandemic, she re-located to Dublin to train at the National Aquatic Centre with the Irish national coach Damian Ball. Prior to this, she was primarily based at the Southampton Diving Academy and coached by Lindsey Fraser. She placed 16th at the 2021 FINA Diving World Cup preliminaries in May 2021, and went on to place 14th in the semi-finals. Her performance at the event ensured her qualification to the postponed 2020 Tokyo Olympics. At the Olympics, Watson placed 16th in the preliminary round with a score of 289.4, earning herself a spot in the semi-finals. She finished 15th in the semi-finals, failing to advance to the final. Watson recently qualified for the 2022 Commonwealth Games in Birmingham, UK. She qualified for final finishing 10th in the preliminary round and maintained that position in the Commonwealth Games final. Her full history of international competition results can be found at the official
