= Ellen Ek =

Swedish diver (born 1997)

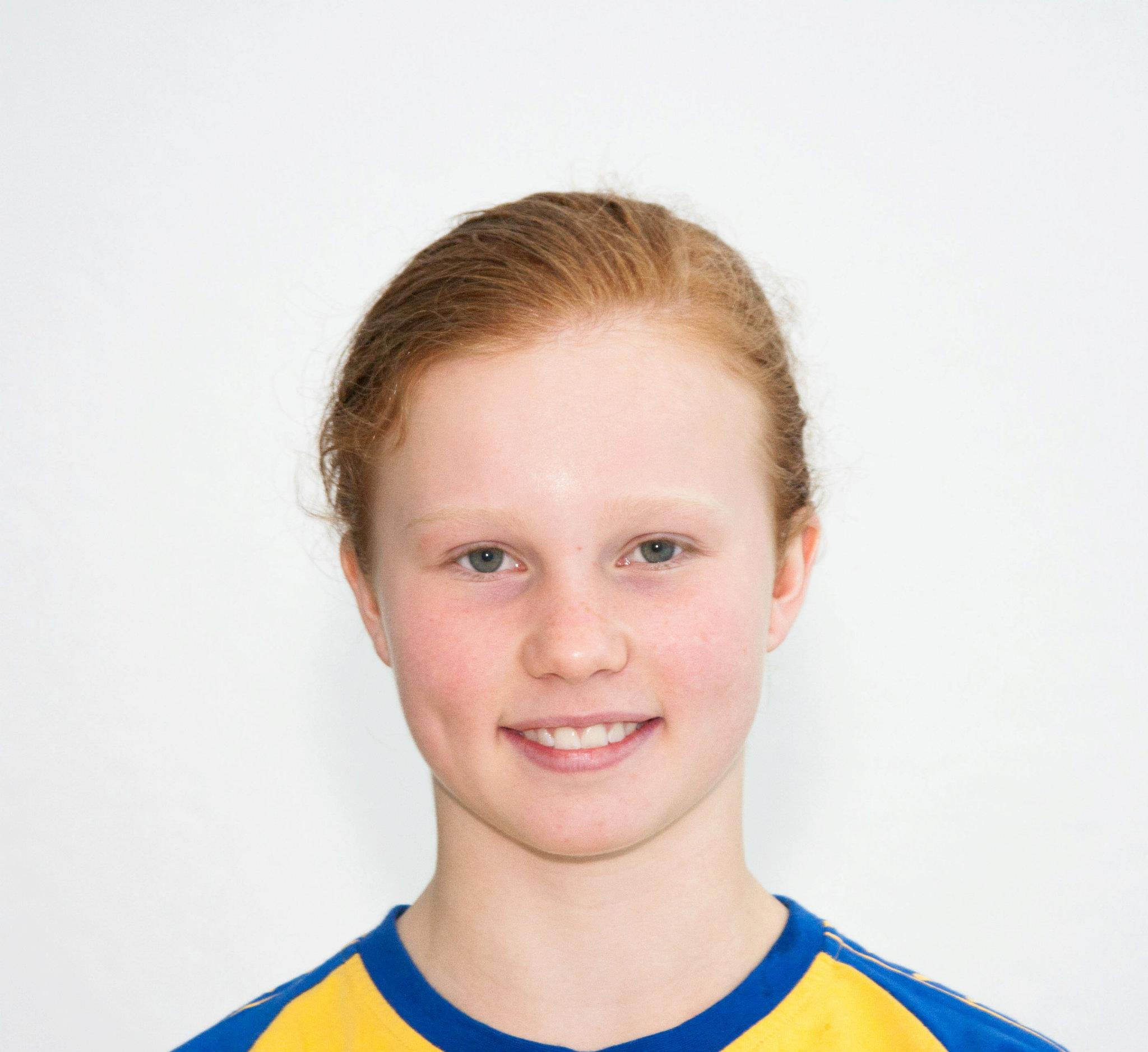
- Ek in 2012

Personal information
- Nationality: Swedish
- Born: 4 July 1997 (age 28)

Sport
- Sport: Diving

Ellen Ek (born 4 July 1997) is a Swedish diver. She competed in the women's 10 metre platform event at the 2019 World Aquatics Championships.
