= Elena Wassen =

German diver (born 2000)

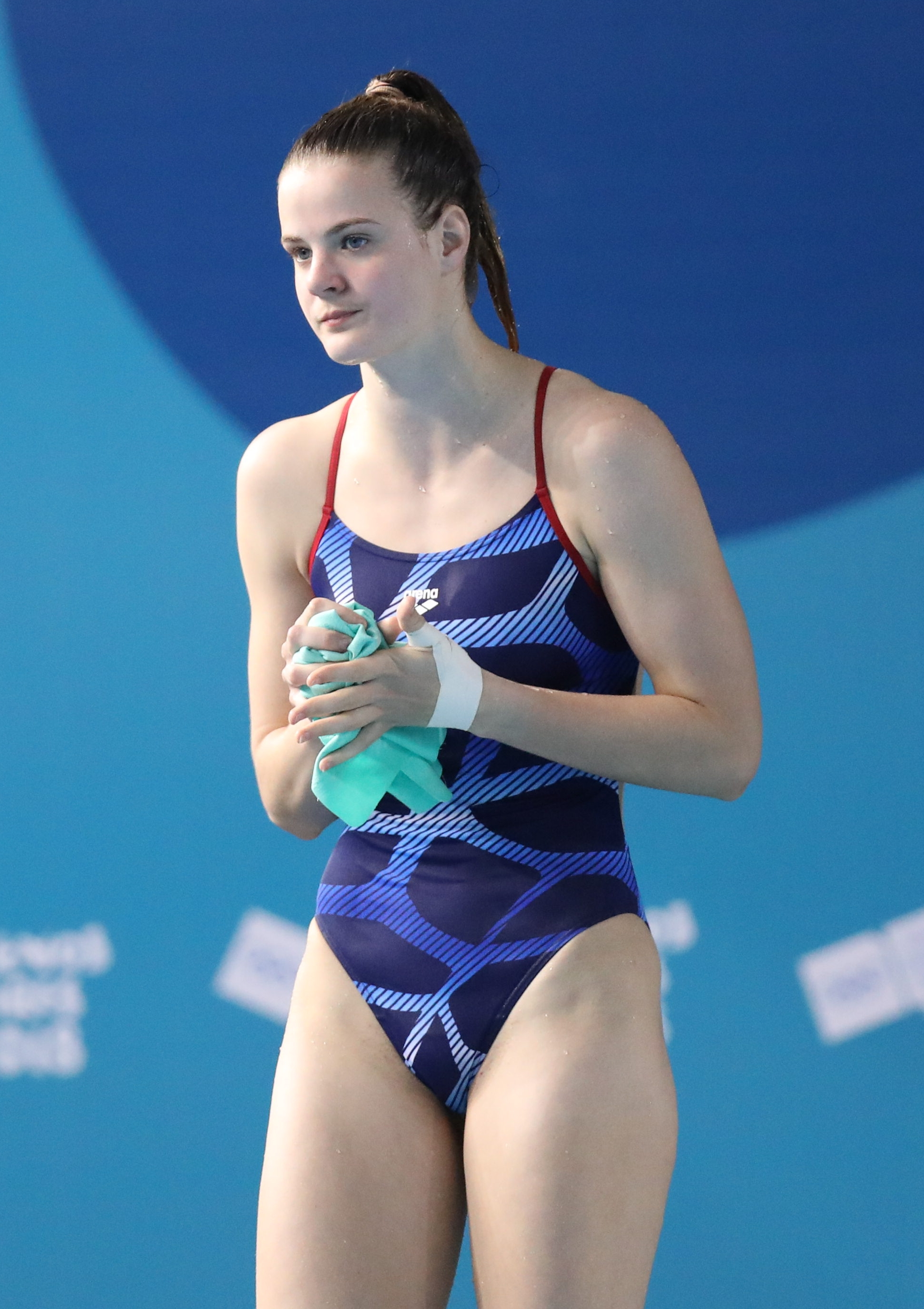
- Wassen in 2018

Personal information
- Born: 1 November 2000 (age 25) Eschweiler, Germany
- Height: 1.75 m (5 ft 9 in)
- Weight: 63 kg (139 lb)

Sport
- Country: Germany
- Sport: Diving
Medal record
European Games
Gold medal – first place	2023 Kraków-Małopolska	10 m synchro
Silver medal – second place	2023 Kraków-Małopolska	10 m mixed synchro
Bronze medal – third place	2015 Baku	10 m platform
European Championships
Silver medal – second place	2026 Paris	10 m synchro
Bronze medal – third place	2018 Glasgow	10m synchro
Bronze medal – third place	2022 Rome	10 m synchro
European Diving Championships
Gold medal – first place	2023 Rzeszów	10 m synchro
Silver medal – second place	2023 Rzeszów	10 m mixed synchro
Youth Olympic Games
Silver medal – second place	2018 Buenos Aires	Mixed team

Elena Wassen (born 1 November 2000) is a German competitive diver.

She competed at the 2015 World Aquatics Championships.

At the 2016 Summer Olympics, she competed in the women's 10 metre platform event. She finished 17th in the semifinal and did not advance to the final. She was the youngest member of the German Olympic team.

== See also ==
- Germany at the 2015 World Aquatics Championships
