= Valeria Antolino =

Spanish diver (born 2002)

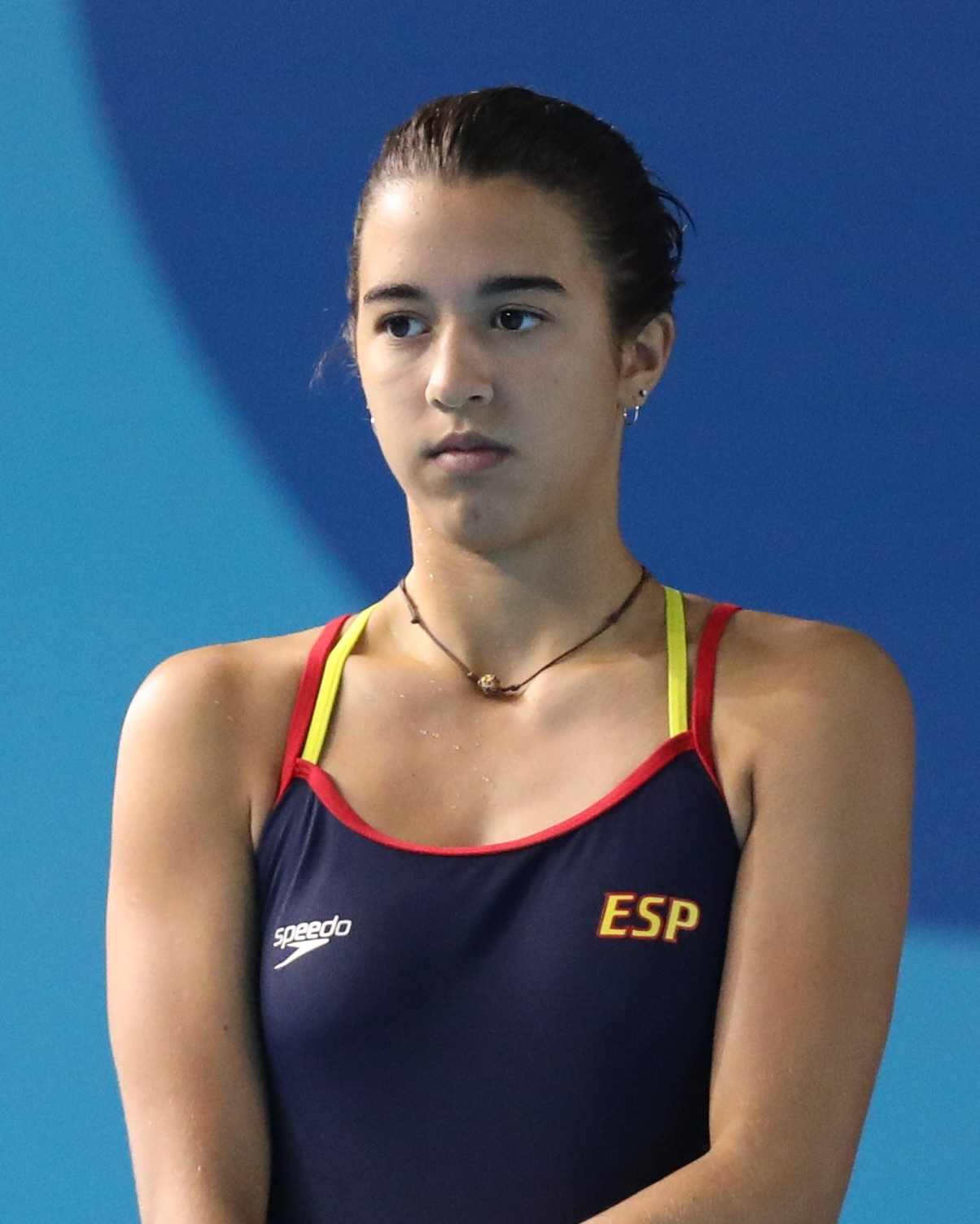

Personal information
- Born: Valeria Angelina Antolino Pacheco; August 30, 2002 (age 23) Venezuela

Sport
- Country: Spain
- Sport: Diving
- Event(s): 3 m springboard, 10 m platform
- Club: Real Canoe N. C.

Valeria Angelina Antolino Pacheco (born 30 August 2002) is a Spanish diver who competes in the springboard and platform events. She is a multiple medallist at the European Aquatics Championships, a double bronze medallist at the 2023 European Games, and finished eighth in the women's 3 metre springboard at the 2024 Summer Olympics in Paris, the best result by a Spanish female diver in Olympic history. She is based in Madrid and competes for the Real Canoe Natación Club.

== Early life ==
Antolino was born in Venezuela and has lived in Madrid since the age of 13. Through her Spanish grandmother she has held Spanish citizenship from birth, and she also holds Italian citizenship inherited from her paternal grandfather.

== Career ==
=== 2023 European Games ===
At the 2023 European Games in Kraków, Antolino won two bronze medals. She first claimed bronze in the mixed team event alongside Alberto Arévalo, Rocío Velázquez and Carlos Camacho, and then took a second bronze in the women's synchronised 10 metre platform with Ana Carvajal, scoring 261.48 points behind Germany and Ukraine.

=== 2024 European Aquatics Championships ===
At the 2024 European Aquatics Championships in Belgrade, Antolino won three medals. She took gold in the mixed team event with Carlos Camacho and Juan Pablo Cortés, and the following day claimed a second gold with Camacho in the mixed 10 metre platform synchro. She later won silver with Ana Carvajal in the women's 10 metre synchronised platform, with a score of 260.67 points, behind the Ukrainian pair Kseniia Bailo and Sofiia Lyskun.

=== 2024 Summer Olympics ===
Antolino represented Spain at the 2024 Summer Olympics in Paris in the women's 3 metre springboard. She qualified for the semifinals in seventh position with 297.70 points in the preliminary round. She advanced to the final and finished eighth with 292.95 points, the best result ever achieved by a Spanish female diver at the Olympic Games.

=== 2025 European Diving Championships ===
At the 2025 European Diving Championships in Antalya, Antolino finished fourth in the individual 10 metre platform final with 298.10 points. She also placed fourth with Carlos Camacho in the mixed 10 metre synchronised platform, and closed the championships with gold in the women's 10 metre synchronised platform alongside Ana Carvajal. The Spanish pair, who had taken silver in the same event in Belgrade the previous year, beat the defending Ukrainian champions Kseniia Bailo and Sofiia Lyskun with 305.82 points to 286.44.

=== 2026 season ===
In April 2026, Antolino took bronze in the individual 10 metre platform at the Italy Open in Turin, finishing behind her compatriot Ana Carvajal (silver) and the Italian Sarah Jodoin di Maria (gold).
