= Turkey at the 2023 European Games =

- IOC code: TUR
- NOC: Turkish Olympic Committee
- Website: www.olimpiyatkomitesi.org.tr

in Kraków and Małopolska, Poland 21 June – 2 July 2023
- Competitors: 193 in 20 sports
- Flag bearers: Nafia Kuş & Emre Kutalmış Ateşli
- Medals Ranked 9th: Gold 9 Silver 9 Bronze 20 Total 38

European Games appearances (overview)
- 2015; 2019; 2023; 2027

Turkey competed at the 2023 European Games, in Kraków and Małopolska, Poland, from 21 June to 2 July 2023 with a total of 193 athletes, including 103 women and 90 men in 20 sports. The flag bearers during the opening ceremony were the taekwondo practitioners Nafia Kuş and Emre Kutalmış Ateşli.

Turkey completed the 2023 European Games with 9 gold, 9 silver and 20 bronze medals in total at ninth place.

== Medals by sports ==
28 of 38 medals in martial arts. Turkey gain medals in 9 sports and cant gain medals in 20 sports.

Medals by sport
Sport	1st place, gold medalist(s)	2nd place, silver medalist(s)	3rd place, bronze medalist(s)	Total
Archery	0	0	2	2
Artistic swimming	0	0	1	1
Athletics	0	2	2	4
Boxing	2	1	3	6
Muaythai	2	2	2	6
Shooting	1	2	0	3
Karate	1	1	4	6
Kickboxing	1	0	3	4
Taekwondo	2	1	3	6
Total (9)	9	9	20	38

== Medalists ==
Medal	Name	Sport	Event	Date
Gold	İsmail Keleş	Shooting	Men's 10 metre air pistol	22 June
Gold	Eray Şamdan	Karate	Men's kumite 60 kg	22 June
Gold	Sude Yaren Uzunçavdar	Taekwondo	Women's 73 kg	26 June
Gold	Nafia Kuş	Taekwondo	Women's +73 kg	26 June
Gold	Gülistan Turan	Muaythai	Women's 51 kg	27 June
Gold	Bediha Tacyıldız	Muaythai	Women's 63.5 kg	27 June
Gold	Busenaz Sürmeneli	Boxing	Women's welterweight	1 July
Gold	Buse Naz Çakıroğlu	Boxing	Women's light flyweight	2 July
Gold	Emine Arslan	Kickboxing	Women's Full Contact 52 kg	2 July
Silver	Ali Sofuoğlu	Karate	Men's individual kata	22 June
Silver	Merve Dinçel	Taekwondo	Women's 49 kg	23 June
Silver	Necati Er	Athletics	Men's triple jump	23 June
Silver	Tuğba Danışmaz	Athletics	Women's triple jump	24 June
Silver	İsmail Keleş; Yusuf Dikeç; Buğra Selimzade	Shooting	Men's team 10 metre air pistol	24 June
Silver	Sercan Koç	Muaythai	Men's 60 kg	27 June
Silver	Kübra Kocakuş	Muaythai	Women's 60 kg	27 June
Silver	Samet Gümüş	Boxing	Men's flyweight	1 July
Silver	Dilara Bedia Kızılsu; Rümeysa Pelin Kaya; Safiye Temizdemir	Shooting	Women's team trap	2 July
Bronze	Serap Özçelik	Karate	Women's kumite 50 kg	22 June
Bronze	Tuba Yakan	Karate	Women's kumite 55 kg	22 June
Bronze	Gülbahar Gözütok	Karate	Women's kumite 61 kg	23 June
Bronze	Erman Eltemur	Karate	Men's kumite 75 kg	23 June
Bronze	Mehmet Çelik	Athletics	Men's 800 m	23 June
Bronze	Turkey artistic swimming team: Esmanur Yirmibeş; Nil Talu; Ayda Salepcioğlu; Melek Andreea Akay; Selin Telci; İsra Yüksel; Derin Aralp; Ece Sokullu; Ece Üngör	Artistic swimming	Free combination routine	23 June
Bronze	İsmail Nezir	Athletics	Men's 400 m hurdles	24 June
Bronze	Hatice Kübra İlgün	Taekwondo	Women's 57 kg	24 June
Bronze	Hüseyin Kartal	Taekwondo	Men's 80 kg	25 June
Bronze	Emre Kutalmış Ateşli	Taekwondo	Men's +87 kg	26 June
Bronze	Enis Yunusoğlu	Muaythai	Men's 81 kg	26 June
Bronze	Ezgi Keleş	Muaythai	Women's 54 kg	26 June
Bronze	Hazal Burun	Archery	Women's individual compound	28 June
Bronze	Emircan Haney	Archery	Men's individual compound	29 June
Bronze	Hatice Akbaş	Boxing	Women's bantamweight	30 June
Bronze	Gizem Özer	Boxing	Women's lightweight	30 June
Bronze	Tuğrulhan Erdemir	Boxing	Men's light middleweight	30 June
Bronze	Recep Men	Kickboxing	Men's Light Contact 79 kg	1 July
Bronze	Cevat Kır	Kickboxing	Men's Point Fighting 84 kg	1 July
Bronze	Funda Güleç	Kickboxing	Women's Point Fighting 60 kg	1 July

== Competitors ==
Team Turkey have selected a squad of 193 athletes (in 20 of 29 sports) to compete in the Kraków-Małopolska 2023 European Games.

Sport	Men	Women	Total
Archery	2	4	6
Artistic Swimming	0	12	12
Athletics	20	19	39
Badminton	1	1	2
Boxing	7	6	13
Canoe Slalom	5	0	5
Canoe Sprint	3	1	4
Cycling	3	0	3
Fencing	6	5	11
Judo	4	6	10
Karate	5	4	9
Kickboxing	5	7	12
Modern Pentathlon	4	4	8
Muaythai	2	4	6
Rugby Sevens	0	13	13
Shooting	10	7	17
Ski Jumping	3	0	3
Table Tennis	1	2	3
Taekwondo	8	7	15
Triathlon	1	1	2
Total (20)	90	103	193

== Archery ==
Turkey qualified 6 athletes for the Games.

Recurve

Athlete	Event	Ranking round		Round of 32	Round of 16	Quarterfinals	Semifinals	Final / BM	
Athlete	Event	Score	Seed	Opposition Score	Opposition Score	Opposition Score	Opposition Score	Opposition Score	Rank
Mete Gazoz	Men's individual	692 GR	1	Kasprowski (POL); W 6-0	Chabin (SUI); W 6-5	Alvariño (ESP); L 4-6	Did not advance		
Ezgi Başaran	Women's individual	650	19	Lassila (FIN); L 4-6	Did not advance				
Zeynep Köse	Women's individual	642	25	Danailova (BUL); L 4-6	Did not advance				
Gülnaz Coşkun	Women's individual	624	33	Amăistroaie (ROU); W 6-2	Pavlova (UKR); L 5-6	Did not advance			
Ezgi Başaran; Zeynep Köse; Gülnaz Coşkun	Women's team	1916	5	—N/a		France; L 0-6	Did not advance		
Ezgi Başaran; Mete Gazoz	Mixed team	1342	5	Bye	Poland; W 6-0	Spain; L 2-6	Did not advance		

Compound

Athlete	Event	Ranking round		Round of 16	Quarterfinals	Semifinals	Final / BM	
Athlete	Event	Score	Seed	Opposition Score	Opposition Score	Opposition Score	Opposition Score	Rank
Emircan Haney	Men's individual	712	6	Lüpkemann (GER); W 149-145	Girard (FRA); W 147-141	Bošanský (SVK); L 145-147	Przybylski (POL); W 149-146	3rd place, bronze medalist(s)
Hazal Burun	Women's individual	705	5	Khomutovska (UKR); W 147-143	Nisula (FIN); W 143-136	Gibson (GBR); L 144-148	Gellenthien (DEN); W 146-138	3rd place, bronze medalist(s)
Hazal Burun; Emircan Haney	Mixed team	1417	2	Bye	Spain; W 155-148	Estonia; L 159-159	Italy; L 152-153	4

== Artistic swimming ==
Athlete	Event	Qualification		Final	
Athlete	Event	Points	Rank	Points	Rank
Esmanur Yirmibeş; Nil Talu	Duet technical routine	157.7500	17	—N/a	
Esmanur Yirmibeş; Nil Talu; Ayda Salepcioğlu; Melek Andreea Akay; Selin Telci; İsra Yüksel; Derin Aralp; Ece Sokullu; Ece Üngör	Team technical routine	—N/a		135.7999	3rd place, bronze medalist(s)

== Athletics ==
Turkey is set to compete in the first division of the 2023 European Athletics Team Championships which is going to be held in Chorzów during, and as part of, the Games. Turkey will compete in the team event, and each athlete will also be eligible for the individual event medals.

European Athletics Team Championships First Division

Team	Event		Event points																			Total	Rank
Team	Event		100m	200m	400m	800m	1500m	5000m	110m h*	400m h	3000m SC	4x100m	4x400m**	SP	JT	HT	DT	PV	HJ	TJ	LJ	Total	Rank
See below	Team Championships First Division	Men																					
See below	Team Championships First Division	Women																					

key: h: hurdles; SC; Steeplechase: SP; Shot put: JT: Javelin: HT: Hammer: DT: Discus: PV: Pole vault: HJ: High jump: TJ: Triple Jump: LJ: Long Jump

- Women compete at 100 metre hurdles, rather than 110 metre hurdles.
- 4 x 400 metres is held as a single mixed sex event

Individual events

As a participant in the Team event, each nation, including Turkey, automatically enters one athlete in each of the individual 'events'. Medals are awarded at the conclusion of the First Division program.

Event	Male Athlete	Score	Rank	Female athlete	Score	Rank
100 m	Kayhan Özer	10.32	9	Elif Polat	11.84	16
200 m	Batuhan Altıntaş	21.19	13	Simay Özçiftçi	23.77	15
400 m	İlyas Çanakçı	47.23	14	Edanur Tulum	53.52	15
800 m	Mehmet Çelik	1:46.84	3rd place, bronze medalist(s)	Tuğba Toptaş	2:03.63	13
1500 m	İbrahim Erata	3:43.55	12	Şilan Ayyıldız	4:16.06	12
5000 m	Ramazan Özdemir	14:00.71	7	Fatma Karasu	15:56.63	13
110/100 m h	Mikdat Sevler	13.82	10	Şevval Ayaz	13.33	10
400m h	İsmail Nezir	48.84	3rd place, bronze medalist(s)	Gülşah Cebeci	1:02.52	15
3000m SC	Turgay Bayram	DQ	—N/a	Tuğba Güvenç	9:47.31	4
4 × 100 m	Ertan Özkan; Kayhan Özer; Batuhan Altıntaş; Ramil Guliyev	38.96	7	Sıla Koloğlu; Şevval Ayaz; Simay Özçiftçi; Elif Polat	44.74	11
4 × 400 m (mixed)	—N/a			İlyas Çanakçı; Edanur Tulum; Oğuzhan Kaya; Elif Polat	3:20.01	13
Shot put	Nuh Bolat	17.93	14	Sinem Yıldırım	15.76	10
Javelin	Emin Öncel	74.18	9	Esra Türkmen	55.32	7
Hammer	Halil Yılmazer	69.30	10	Tuğçe Şahutoğlu	61.92	12
Discus	Ömer Şahin	57.75	11	Nurten Mermer	50.89	11
Pole vault	Ersu Şaşma	5.45	11	Buse Arıkazan	4.10	15
High jump	Ali Eren Ünlü	2.20	6	Buse Savaşkan	1.87	4
Triple Jump	Necati Er	16.71	2nd place, silver medalist(s)	Tuğba Danışmaz	14.16	2nd place, silver medalist(s)
Long Jump	Necati Er	7.10	15	Ecem Çalağan	5.95	15

== Badminton ==
Athlete	Event	Group stage				Round of 16	Quarter-finals	Semi-finals	Final	
Athlete	Event	Opposition Score	Opposition Score	Opposition Score	Rank	Opposition Score	Opposition Score	Opposition Score	Opposition Score	Rank
Neslihan Yiğit	Women's singles	Kuuba (EST); W (18–21, 21–17, 21–10)	Sotiriou (GRE); W (21–6, 21–10)	Romanova (LAT); W (21–6, 21–8)	1 Q	Buhrova (UKR); W (21–9, 21–16)	Blichfeldt (DEN); L (18–21, 8–21)	Did not advance		
Emre Lale	Men's singles	Antonsen (DEN); L (12–21, 9–21)	Koljonen (FIN); L (18–21, 11–21)	Burestedt (SWE); L (18–21, 10–21)	4	Did not advance				

== Boxing ==
Turkey qualified 13 athletes for the Games.

Men

Athlete	Event	Round of 32	Round of 16	Quarterfinals	Semifinals	Final / BM	
Athlete	Event	Opposition Result	Opposition Result	Opposition Result	Opposition Result	Opposition Result	Rank
Samet Gümüş	Men's 51 kg	Bye	Zamotayev (UKR); W 3-1	Molina (ESP); W 5-0	Serra (ITA); W 4-1	Bennama (FRA); L 1-4	2nd place, silver medalist(s)
Batuhan Çiftçi	Men's 57 kg	Serikov (EST); W 5-0	Quiles (ESP); L 0-5	Did not advance			
Bilge Kağan Kanlı	Men's 63.5 kg	Christodoulou (CYP); W 5-0	Bajoku (KOS); W 3-2	Oumiha (FRA); L 0-5	Did not advance		
Tuğrulhan Erdemir	Men's 71 kg	Bozorov (MDA); W 5-0	Zakharieiev (UKR); W 3-2	Schachidov (GER); W 5-0	Terteryan (DEN); L WO	—N/a	3rd place, bronze medalist(s)
Kaan Aykutsun	Men's 80 kg	Aradoaie (ROU); L 1-3	Did not advance				
Berat Acar	Men's 92 kg	Bye	Williams (GBR); W 3-2	Mouhiidine (ITA); L 0-5	Did not advance		
Uğur Aydemir	Men's +92 kg	Abdullayev (AZE); L RSC R3	Did not advance				

Women

Athlete	Event	Round of 32	Round of 16	Quarterfinals	Semifinals	Final / BM	
Athlete	Event	Opposition Result	Opposition Result	Opposition Result	Opposition Result	Opposition Result	Rank
Buse Naz Çakıroğlu	Women's 50 kg	Bye	Grigoryan (ARM); W 5-0	Rok (POL); W 5-0	Sorrentino (ITA); W 5-0	Lkhadiri (FRA); W 5-0	1st place, gold medalist(s)
Hatice Akbaş	Women's 54 kg	Bye	Lakotár (HUN); W 5-0	Charaabi (ITA); W 4-1	Perijoc (ROU); L 2-3	—N/a	3rd place, bronze medalist(s)
Ayşen Taşkın	Women's 57 kg	Bye	Walsh (IRL); L 0-5	Did not advance			
Gizem Özer	Women's 60 kg	Chiper (MDA); W 5-0	Starovoitova (LTU); W 4-0	Okhrei (UKR); W 5-0	Shadrina (SRB); L 1-4	—N/a	3rd place, bronze medalist(s)
Busenaz Sürmeneli	Women's 66 kg	Auciute (LTU); W 5-0	Mavromatti (GRE); RSC R2	Rygielska (POL); W 5-0	Eccles (GBR); W 4-1	Derieuw (BEL); W 5-0	1st place, gold medalist(s)
Büşra Işıldar	Women's 75 kg	Bye	Stonkutė (LTU); W 3-2	Wójcik (POL); L 0-5	Did not advance		

== Karate ==
Turkey qualified 9 athletes for the Games.

Men

Athlete	Category	Group stage				Semifinals	Final	
Athlete	Category	Opposition Result	Opposition Result	Opposition Result	Rank	Opposition Result	Opposition Result	Rank
Ali Sofuoğlu	Kata	Busato (ITA); W 41.40-41.30	Nagy (HUN); W 42.70-41.00	Szczypkowski (POL); W 42.60-38.60	1	Ujihara (SUI); W 44.60–42.30	Quintero (ESP); L 44.10–44.60	2nd place, silver medalist(s)
Eray Şamdan	60 kg	Xenos (GRE); W 2–1	Guliyev (AZE); W 7–0	Kwaśniewski (POL); W 1–0	1	Crescenzo (ITA); W 0–0	Xenos (GRE); W 2–2	1st place, gold medalist(s)
Burak Uygur	67 kg	Comănescu (ROU); L 1–2	Sabiecki (POL); L 2–3	Pavlov (MKD); L 0–6	4	Did not advance		
Erman Eltemur	75 kg	Mahauden (BEL); W 10–5	Wilkins (GBR); W 5–2	Drążewski (POL); W 3–0	1	Vivo (ITA); L 3–4	—N/a	3rd place, bronze medalist(s)
Fatih Şen	+84 kg	Kvesić (CRO); L 3–5	Tzanos (GRE); W 8–0	Gębka (POL); W 3–1	2	Arkania (GEO); W 5–1	Kvesić (CRO); L 0-5	DSQ

Women

Athlete	Category	Group stage				Semifinals	Final	
Athlete	Category	Opposition Result	Opposition Result	Opposition Result	Rank	Opposition Result	Opposition Result	Rank
Dilara Bozan	Kata	Bjerring (DEN); W 41.30-36.80	García (ESP); L 41.90-43.20	Xenou (GRE); L 41.20-41.90	3	Did not advance		
Serap Özçelik	50 kg	Perfetto (ITA); L 4–4	Hubrich (GER); D 0–0	Teymurova (AZE); W 3–1	2	Plank (AUT); L 3–5	—N/a	3rd place, bronze medalist(s)
Tuba Yakan	55 kg	Terliuga (UKR); L 2–4	Bugur (GER); W 3–2	Brunori (ITA); W 6–2	2	Goranova (BUL); L 3–3	—N/a	3rd place, bronze medalist(s)
Gülbahar Gözütok	61 kg	Khamis (GER); L 0–3	Snel (NED); W 1–0	Mikulska (POL); W 11–3	2	Serogina (UKR); L 0–2	—N/a	3rd place, bronze medalist(s)

== Kickboxing ==
Turkey qualified through the 2022 European Championships 12 athletes (5 male and 7 female) for the Games.

Men

Athlete	Category	Quarterfinals	Semi-finals	Final/Bronze medal bout	
Athlete	Category	Opposition Result	Opposition Result	Opposition Result	Rank
Emrah Yaşar	Full Contact 86 kg	Krason (POL); L 1–2	Did not advance		
Nurettin Diler	Light Contact 63 kg	Penzo (ITA); L 0–3	Did not advance		
Recep Men	Light Contact 79 kg	Rzepka (POL); W 3–0	Fésű (HUN); L 0–3	—N/a	3rd place, bronze medalist(s)
Ferit Özdemir	Point Fighting 63 kg	Leovari (GRE); L 7–11	Did not advance		
Cevat Kır	Point Fighting 84 kg	Shikongo (FIN); W 11–1	Peters (GER); L 3–13	—N/a	3rd place, bronze medalist(s)

Women

Athlete	Category	Quarterfinals	Semi-finals	Final/Bronze medal bout	
Athlete	Category	Opposition Result	Opposition Result	Opposition Result	Rank
Emine Arslan	Full Contact 52 kg	Morales (ESP); W 2–1	Andersen (NOR); W 2–1	Perona (ITA); W 3–0	1st place, gold medalist(s)
Büşra Demirayak	Full Contact 60 kg	Czégény (HUN); L 1–2	Did not advance		
Sabriye Gür	Full Contact 70 kg	Zec (CRO); L 1–2	Did not advance		
Afra Adıyaman	Light Contact 50 kg	Semeli (GRE); L 1–2	Did not advance		
Aybüke Kılınç	Point Fighting 50 kg	Torok (HUN); L 4–8	Did not advance		
Funda Güleç	Point Fighting 60 kg	Goralczykova (SVK); W 22–18	Busa (HUN); L 3–8	—N/a	3rd place, bronze medalist(s)
Fatmanur Karagöz	Point Fighting 70 kg	Angelino (ITA); L 5–13	Did not advance		

== Modern pentathlon ==
▲

Athlete	Event	Fencing (épée one touch)				Swimming (200 m freestyle)			Riding (show jumping)			Combined: shooting/running (10 m air pistol)/(3200 m)			Total points	Final rank
Athlete	Event	RR	BR	Rank	MP points	Time	Rank	MP points	Penalties	Rank	MP points	Time	Rank	MP points	Total points	Final rank
Buğra Ünal	Men's individual															
Tolga Topaklı	Men's individual															
Eren Kıvanç Taşyaran	Men's individual															
Dora Nusretoğlu	Men's individual															
	Men's team															
İlke Mihrioğlu	Women's individual															
İpek Akşin	Women's individual															
Yaren Nur Polat	Women's individual															
Sıdal Aslan	Women's individual															
	Women's team															
	Mixed team															

== Muaythai ==
Athlete	Event	Quarterfinal	Semi-final	Final	
Athlete	Event	Opposition Result	Opposition Result	Opposition Result	Rank
Sercan Koç	Men's 60 kg	Bye	Mykytas (UKR); W 29-28	De Leu (BEL); L 28-29	2nd place, silver medalist(s)
Enis Yunusoğlu	Men's 81 kg	Dos Santos (ITA); W RET R2	Livadari (MDA); L 28-29	—N/a	3rd place, bronze medalist(s)
Gülistan Turan	Women's 51 kg	Chochlíková (SVK); W 30-27	Djedidi (FRA); W 30-27	Dargiel (POL); W 30-27	1st place, gold medalist(s)
Ezgi Keleş	Women's 54 kg	Dos Santos (FRA); W 30-27	Depypere (BEL); L 27-30	—N/a	3rd place, bronze medalist(s)
Kübra Kocakuş	Women's 60 kg	Nardelotti (ITA); W 30-27	Piccirillo (BEL); W 30-27	Grents (EST); L 27-30	2nd place, silver medalist(s)
Bediha Tacyıldız	Women's 63.5 kg	Bodač (CRO); W 30-27	Mingsupphakun (FIN); W 30-27	Štechová (CZE); W 30-27	1st place, gold medalist(s)

== Rugby sevens ==
Athletes	Event	Group stage				9-12	11-12	Rank
Athletes	Event	Opponent Score	Opponent Score	Opponent Score	Rank	Opponent Score	Opponent Score	Rank
Ayça Akçınar; Gamze Aksoy; Gülnur Sak; Fatmanur Diril; Mihriban Okat; Nazlıcan Erdoğan; Melike Şahan Köse / Gülşah Çakmak; Saime Zeynep Aydın; Vahide Kahraman; Hülya Ataşçı; Sedanur Bolat; Nermin Cem	Women's	Poland; L 0-50	Germany; L 5-31	Portugal; L 5-36	4	Sweden; L 7-10	Norway; L 5-10	12

== Table tennis ==
Athlete	Event	Round 1	Round 2	Round 3	Round of 16	Quarterfinals	Semifinals	Final / BM	
Athlete	Event	Opposition Score	Opposition Score	Opposition Score	Opposition Score	Opposition Score	Opposition Score	Opposition Score	Rank
İbrahim Gündüz	Men's singles	Gionis (GRE); L 0-4	Did not advance						
Sibel Altınkaya	Women's singles	Blaskova (CZE); L 3-4	Did not advance						
Özge Yılmaz	Women's singles	Tofant (SLO); L 1-4	Did not advance						
Sibel Altınkaya; İbrahim Gündüz	Mixed doubles	—N/a			Sweden; W 3-2	Germany; L 2-3	Did not advance		

== Taekwondo ==
Turkey qualified 15 athletes for the Games.

Men

Athlete	Event	Round of 16	Quarterfinals	Semifinals / RP	Final / BM	
Athlete	Event	Opposition Result	Opposition Result	Opposition Result	Opposition Result	Rank
Görkem Polat	54 kg	Marwan (SWE); L 0-2	Did not advance			
Ömer Faruk Dayıoğlu	58 kg	Nour (GBR); L 0-2	Did not advance			
Hakan Reçber	63 kg	Avramov (BUL); W 2-0	Alaphilippe (FRA); L 0-1	Did not advance		
Ferhat Can Kavurat	68 kg	Glasnović (CRO); L 1-2	Did not advance			
Muhammed Emin Yıldız	74 kg	Thune (NOR); W 2-0	Golubić (CRO); L 1-2	Did not advance		
Hüseyin Kartal	80 kg	Bouzid (FRA); W 2-1	Ordemann (NOR); L 1-2	Jochman (CZE); W 2-1	Cintado (ESP); W 2-0	3rd place, bronze medalist(s)
Enbiya Taha Biçer	87 kg	Theocharous (CYP); W 2-0	Snacov (ROU); W 2-0	Šapina (CRO); L 0-2	Bailey (HUN); L 1-2	5
Emre Kutalmış Ateşli	+87 kg	Marinescu (MDA); W 2-0	Cunningham (GBR); L 0-2	Pilipovic (NOR); W 2-1	García (ESP); W 2-0	3rd place, bronze medalist(s)

Women

Athlete	Event	Round of 16	Quarterfinals	Semifinals	Final / BM	
Athlete	Event	Opposition Result	Opposition Result	Opposition Result	Opposition Result	Rank
Rukiye Yıldırım	46 kg	Çelik (GER); L 0-2	Did not advance			
Merve Dinçel	49 kg	Bye	Moore (GBR); W 2-0	Kisskalt (GER); W 2-0	Cerezo (ESP); L 1-2	2nd place, silver medalist(s)
Sıla Ezgi Yağcı	53 kg	Oleszczuk (POL); W 2-1	Aydin (GER); L 1-2	Did not advance		
Hatice Kübra İlgün	57 kg	Bye	Tvaronavičiūtė (LTU); W 2-0	Márton (HUN); L 1-2	Ortiz (LTU); W 2-0	3rd place, bronze medalist(s)
İkra Kayır	67 kg	Jelić (CRO); L 0-2	Did not advance			
Sude Yaren Uzunçavdar	73 kg	Füredi (HUN); W 2-0	Laurin (FRA); W 2-0	Klepac (CRO); W 2-0	Božanić (SRB); W 2-0	1st place, gold medalist(s)
Nafia Kuş	+73 kg	Padla (HUN); W 2-0	Boyadzhieva (BUL); W 2-0	Avoulète (FRA); W 2-0	Kowalczuk (POL); W 2-0	1st place, gold medalist(s)

== Triathlon ==
Athlete	Event	Swim (1.5 km)	Trans 1	Bike (40 km)	Trans 2	Run (10 km)	Total Time	Rank
Gültigin Er	Men's individual	18:39	0:55	57:24	0:40	36:22	1:53:57	48
Xisca Tous	Women's individual	20:36	0:58	1:04:52	0:31	38:15	2:05:11	37
