= Armenia at the 2023 European Games =

- IOC code: ARM
- NOC: Armenian Olympic Committee
- Website: www.armnoc.am

in Kraków and Małopolska, Poland 21 June – 2 July 2023
- Competitors: 52 in 9 sports
- Flag bearers: Gayane Chiloyan; Levon Aghasyan
- Medals Ranked 37th: Gold 0 Silver 1 Bronze 2 Total 3

European Games appearances (overview)
- 2015; 2019; 2023; 2027

Armenia competed at the 2023 European Games, in Kraków and Małopolska, Poland, from 21 June to 2 July 2023.

== Medalists ==
Medal	Name	Sport	Event	Date
2nd place, silver medalist(s)	Benik Khlghatyan; Elmira Karapetyan	Shooting	Mixed team 10 metre air pistol	23 June
3rd place, bronze medalist(s)	Anita Makyan	Karate	Women's kumite -68 kg	23 June
3rd place, bronze medalist(s)	Narek Khachikyan	Muaythai	Men's -60kg	26 June

== Competitors ==
Sport	Men	Women	Total
Athletics	12	9	21
Boxing	7	6	13
Diving	3	1	4
Fencing	4	1	5
Karate	0	1	1
Muaythai	3	1	4
Shooting	1	2	3
Taekwondo	1	0	1
Teqball	2	1	3
Total	33	22	55

== Athletics ==
Armenia has competed in the third division of the 2023 European Athletics Team Championships which was held in Chorzów during the Games.

=== European Athletics Team Championships Third Division ===
Team	Event		Event points																			Total	Rank
Team	Event		100m	200m	400m	800m	1500m	5000m	110m h*	400m h	3000m SC	4 × 100 m	4 × 400 m**	SP	JT	HT	DT	PV	HJ	TJ	LJ	Total	Rank
Armenia	Team Championships Third Division	Men	3	3	4	10	13	11	0	3	6	4	11	6	5	5	8	0	0	15	7	255	10
Armenia	Team Championships Third Division	Women	5	12	10	9	5	5	8	10	10	9	11	9	9	8	5	0	0	14	13	255	10

key: h: hurdles; SC; Steeplechase: SP; Shot put: JT: Javelin: HT: Hammer: DT: Discus: PV: Pole vault: HJ: High jump: TJ: Triple Jump: LJ: Long Jump

- Women compete at 100 metre hurdles, rather than 110 metre hurdles.
- 4 x 400 metres is held as a single mixed sex event

=== Individual events at the 2023 European Games ===
As a participant in the Team event, each nation automatically enters one athlete in each of the individual events.

Event	Male Athlete	Score	Division ranking	Overall ranking	Female athlete	Score	Division ranking	Overall ranking
100 m	Gor Harutyunyan	11.93	13	45	Marianna Baghyan	12.41	11	43
200 m	Davit Sargsyan	23.11	13	44	Gayane Chiloyan	24.36	4	35
400 m	Davit Sargsyan	50.15	12	44	Gayane Chiloyan	57.47	6	36
800 m	Roman Aleksanyan	1:53.92	6	37	Ellada Alaverdyan	2:11.17	7	37
1500 m	Yervand Mkrtchyan	3:44.11	3	23	Mari Sargsyan	4:54.92	11	42
5000 m	Vanya Sargsyan	14:23.92	5	30	Mari Sargsyan	19:14.92	11	43
110/100 m h	Aram Aramyan	Disqualified			Meline Adamyan	15.52	8	38
400m h	Aram Aranyan	57.84	13	42	Allison Halverson	1:02.38	6	34
3000m SC	Sos Harutyunyan	10:55.42	10	41	Ellada Alaverdyan	11:02.54	6	34
4 × 100 m	Gagik Adamyan; Gor Beglaryan; Gor Harutyunyan; Davit Sargsyan	45.53	12	38	Marianna Baghyan; Gayane Chiloyan; Yana Sargsyan; Inga Shekoyan	48.95	7	29
4 × 400 m (mixed)	—N/a				Gayane Chiloyan; Allison Halverson; Gor Harutyunyan; Davit Sargsyan	3:29.99	7	37
High jump	No athlete				No athlete			
Pole vault	No athlete				No athlete			
Long Jump	Gor Beglaryan	6.91	9	38	Yana Sargsyan	5.99	3	27
Triple Jump	Levon Aghasyan	16.36	1	5	Yana Sargsyan	13.06	2	16
Shot put	Manuk Manukyan	13.77	10	42	Allison Halverson	11.79	7	39
Discus	Manuk Manukyan	43.36	10	39	Zhanna Shahnazaryan	26.31	11	43
Hammer	Vanik Arakelyan	18.63	11	41	Zhanna Shahnazaryan	48.58	8	37
Javelin	Vanik Arakelyan	38.76	11	43	Allison Halverson	36.27	7	38

== Boxing ==
Athlete	Event	Round of 32	Round of 16	Quarterfinal	Semifinal	Final	
Athlete	Event	Opposition Result	Opposition Result	Opposition Result	Opposition Result	Opposition Result	Rank
Rudolf Garboyan	Men's flyweight	Bye	Serra (ITA); L 0-5	Did Not Advance			9
Artur Bazeyan	Men's featherweight	Trakal (CZE); W 5-0	Prokudins (LAT); W 4-0	Ibáñez Diaz (BUL); L 0-5	Did Not Advance		5
Narek Hovhannisyan	Men's light welterweight	Shtiwi (ISR); W 3-2	Kovács (HUN); L 1-4	Did Not Advance			9
Gurgen Madoyan	Men's light middleweight	Savković (MNE); W 5-0	Kamanin (EST); W 5-0	Abasov (SRB); L 1-4	Did Not Advance		5
Hambardzum Hakobyan	Men's light heavyweight	Marčić (MNE); W 4-1	Mironchikov (SRB); W 3-2	Allahverdiyev (AZE); L 0-5	Did Not Advance		5
Narek Manasyan	Men's heavyweight	Bye	Reyes Pla (ESP); L 0-5	Did Not Advance			9
Davit Chaloyan	Men's super heavyweight	Babić (SRB); W 5-0	Pinc (CZE); W 5-0	Orie (GBR); L 0-5	Did Not Advance		5
Anush Grigoryan	Women's light flyweight	Bye	Çakıroğlu (TUR); L 0-5	Did Not Advance			9
Ekaterina Sycheva	Women's bantamweight	Bye	Drabik (POL); L 1-4	Did Not Advance			9
Tatevik Khachatryan	Women's featherweight	Bye	Hamzayeva Aghamaliy (AZE); L 0-5	Did Not Advance			9
Elida Kocharyan	Women's lightweight	Bye	Harrington (IRL); L 0-5	Did Not Advance			9
Sona Harutyunyan	Women's welterweight	Bye	Sonvico (FRA); L RSC	Did Not Advance			9
Ani Hovsepyan	Women's middleweight	Djankeu Ngamba (EOR); L 0-5	Did Not Advance				17

== Diving ==
Athlete	Event	Preliminary		Final	
Athlete	Event	Points	Rank	Points	Rank
Marat Grigoryan	Men's 10m platform	253.40	15	Did Not Advance	
Alisa Zakaryan	Women's 10m platform	123.75	18	Did Not Advance	
Marat Grigoryan; Vladimir Harutyunyan	Men's synchronized 10m platform	—N/a		306.42	7
Alisa Zakaryan; Vladimir Harutyunyan; Arman Enokyan; Marat Grigoryan	Mixed team 3m/10m	—N/a		215.85	8

== Fencing ==
Athlete	Event	Preliminaries	Round of 128	Round of 64	Round of 32	Round of 16	Quarterfinal	Semifinal	Final	
Athlete	Event	W/B	Opposition Result	Opposition Result	Opposition Result	Opposition Result	Opposition Result	Opposition Result	Opposition Result	Rank
Boris Dadayan	Men's individual foil	1/6	—N/a	Did Not Advance						66
Grigor Papoyan	Men's individual foil	0/6	—N/a	Did Not Advance						76
Alik Navasardyan	Men's individual épée	0/6	—N/a	Did Not Advance						87
Grigor Mnatsakanyan	Men's individual épée	2/6	Rod (POR); L 7-15	Did Not Advance						69
Emma Poghosova	Women's individual épée	2/6	—N/a	Zens (LUX); L 5-15	Did Not Advance					54

== Karate ==
Athlete	Event	Group Stage				Semifinal	Final	
Athlete	Event	Opposition Result	Opposition Result	Opposition Result	Rank	Opposition Result	Opposition Result	Rank
Anita Makyan	Women's kumite 68 kg	Nieto Mejias (ESP); W 4-4	Zaretska (AZE); L 0-8	Melnyk (UKR); W 3-0	2 Q	Quirici (SUI); L 0-4	Did Not Advance	3rd place, bronze medalist(s)

== Muaythai ==
Athlete	Event	Quarterfinal	Semifinal	Final	
Athlete	Event	Opposition Result	Opposition Result	Opposition Result	Rank
Narek Khachikyan	Men's 60 kg	Balbach (GER); W RSCS	De Leu (BEL); L 27-30	Did Not Advance	3rd place, bronze medalist(s)
Gor Sargsyan	Men's 67 kg	Siegert (POL); L RSCS	Did Not Advance		5
Armen Grigoryan	Men's 71 kg	Kubila (FRA); L 27-30	Did Not Advance		5
Lusi Ter Davityan	Women's 63.5 kg	Stechova (CZE); L CCL	Did Not Advance		5

== Shooting ==
Athlete	Event	Qualification				Final/BM	
Athlete	Event	Score	Rank	Score	Rank	Score	Rank
Benik Khlghatyan	Men's 10m air pistol	573	22	—N/a		Did Not Advance	
Yerjanik Avetisian	Women's skeet	65	26	112	23	Did Not Advance	
Elmira Karapetyan	Women's 10m air pistol	572	12	—N/a		Did Not Advance	
Elmira Karapetyan; Benik Khlghatyan	Mixed team 10m air pistol	581	2 GM	—N/a		Monna/Constantino (ITA); L 7-17	2nd place, silver medalist(s)

== Taekwondo ==
Athlete	Event	Round of 16	Quarterfinal	Semifinal	Final	
Athlete	Event	Opponent Score	Opponent Score	Opponent Score	Opponent Score	Rank
Sargis Sargsyan	Men's -74 kg	Quesada Barrera (ESP); L WDR	Did Not Advance			9

== Teqball ==
Team	Event	Group stage				Quarterfinal	Semifinal	Final / BM	
Team	Event	Opposition Score	Opposition Score	Opposition Score	Rank	Opposition Score	Opposition Score	Opposition Score	Rank
Gor Sargsyan	Men's singles	H-Wellenhof (AUT); W 2-0	Thomsen (DEN); L 1-2	—N/a	2	Did Not Advance			
Kristine Mangasaryan	Women's singles	Zelenska (UKR); W 2-0	Julian (FRA); L 0-2	Hillmann (GER); L 0-2	3	Did Not Advance			
Gor Sargsyan; Rafayel Vardanyan	Men's doubles	Badar/Rodman (SVK); W 2-0	Gyoergydeak/Ilyes (ROU); L 1-2	—N/a	2 Q	Marojevic/Mitro (SRB); L 0-2	Did Not Advance		5
Rafayel Vardanyan; Kristine Mangasaryan	Mixed doubles	Umicevic/Mitro (SRB); L 0-2	Pejic/Bungisch (CRO); W 2-0	Shevchuk/Fesenko (UKR); W 2-1	2 Q	Flaks/Zachova (CZE); L 1-2	Did Not Advance		5
