= Cycling at the 2023 European Games =

- Venues: Krynica-Zdrój Hill Park (Mountain bike); Krzeszowice BMX Park (BMX Freestyle)
- Location: Krynica-Zdrój, Poland (MTB); Krzeszowice (BMX)
- Dates: 21 and 22 June (BMX); 25 June (MTB)
- Competitors: 178 from 29 nations

The cycling competitions of the 2023 European Games in Poland were held at two venues. Mountain bike cross-country took place at the Krynica-Zdrój Hill Park, while BMX freestyle took place at the new skatepark at Krzeszowice.

Road, and track did not return to the program in 2023. Cycling competitions across various disciplines have been contested in both of the European Games since the first in 2015.

== Venues ==
Venue	Sport	Date	Medal events	Capacity
Krynica-Zdrój Hill Park, Krynica-Zdrój	Mountain Bike cross country	25 June	2	9000
Krzeszowice BMX Park, Krzeszowice	BMX freestyle Park	21-22 June	2	

== Participation ==
NOC	Mountain bike		BMX Freestyle		Total
NOC	Men	Women	Men	Women	Total
Austria	3	3			6
Belgium	4	2			6
Bosnia and Herzegovina	1				1
Croatia			1		1
Czech Republic	4	2	2	2	10
Denmark	2	2			4
Estonia	2	3	1	1	7
France	1	2	2	1	6
Germany	5	5	2	3	15
Great Britain	2	1	2	3	8
Greece			1		1
Hungary	1	1	2		4
Ireland	1		1		2
Israel	3	1			4
Italy	4	3	2		9
Kosovo	1				1
Latvia	2		2		4
Lithuania	2		2		4
Netherlands	2	6	2		10
Norway	4	1			5
Poland	8	8	2	2	20
Portugal	1	1			2
Romania	4				4
Slovakia	1	2	2	2	7
Slovenia	1	2	2		5
Spain	4	2	1	1	8
Switzerland	7	6		1	14
Turkey	3				3
Ukraine	3	3	1		7
Total: 29 NOCs	76	56	30	16	178

== Medal table ==
* Host nation (Poland)

Rank	Nation	Gold	Silver	Bronze	Total
1	Great Britain	1	0	1	2
2	Czech Republic	1	0	0	1
2	Netherlands	1	0	0	1
2	Romania	1	0	0	1
5	France	0	1	1	2
5	Switzerland	0	1	1	2
7	Austria	0	1	0	1
7	Germany	0	1	0	1
9	Italy	0	0	1	1
Totals (9 entries)		4	4	4	12

== Medal summary ==
=== Mountain bike ===
Event	Gold	Silver	Bronze
Men's mountain bike	Vlad Dascălu; Romania	Lars Forster; Switzerland	Luca Braidot; Italy
Women's mountain bike	Puck Pieterse; Netherlands	Mona Mitterwallner; Austria	Sina Frei; Switzerland

=== BMX Freestyle ===
Event	Gold	Silver	Bronze
Men's park	Kieran Reilly; Great Britain	Anthony Jeanjean; France	Declan Brooks; Great Britain
Women's park	Iveta Miculyčová; Czech Republic	Kim Lea Müller; Germany	Laury Perez; France
