= Archery at the 2023 European Games – Men's individual compound =

Archery event

Men's individual compound at the 2023 European Games
- Venue: Plaszowianka Archery Park
- Date: 23–29 June
- Competitors: 16 from 16 nations

Medalists
gold medal	Jozef Bošanský	Slovakia
silver medal	Marco Bruno	Italy
bronze medal	Emircan Haney	Turkey

The men's individual compound competition at the 2023 European Games was held from 23 to 29 June 2023 at the Plaszowianka Archery Park in Kraków, Poland.

== Records ==
Prior to the competition, the existing world, European and Games records were as follows:

- 72 arrow ranking round

World record	Braden Gellenthien (USA)	718	Decatur, United States	13 July 2016
European record	Mike Schloesser (NED)	718	Schijndel, Netherlands	3 July 2021
Games record	Ognjen Nedeljković (SRB)	708	Minsk, Belarus	21 June 2019

- 15 arrow match

World record	Reo Wilde (USA)	150/12	Shanghai, China	7 May 2015
European record	Stephan Hansen (DEN)	150/11	Wrocław, Poland	30 July 2017
Games record	Mike Schloesser (NED)	149	Minsk, Belarus	23 June 2019

== Results ==
=== Ranking round ===
The ranking round took place on 23 June 2023 to determine the seeding for the knockout rounds. It consisted of two rounds of 36 arrows, with a maximum score of 720.

Rank	Archer	Nation	Score	10s	Xs
1	Mike Schloesser	Netherlands	718 GR	70	44
2	Mathias Fullerton	Denmark	717	69	34
3	Nicolas Girard	France	716	68	36
4	Łukasz Przybylski	Poland	715	67	47
5	Shamai Yamrom	Israel	715	67	34
6	Emircan Haney	Turkey	712	64	38
7	Jozef Bošanský	Slovakia	709	61	29
8	Marco Bruno	Italy	708	60	26
9	Aljaž Matija Brenk	Slovenia	706	58	31
10	Ramón López	Spain	702	54	22
11	Henning Lüpkemann	Germany	701	54	29
12	Dimitrios Drakiotis	Greece	700	55	23
13	László Szíjártó	Hungary	700	53	22
14	Jonas Grigaravičius	Lithuania	699	52	19
15	Robin Jäätma	Estonia	699	52	18
16	Jacob Benschjöld	Sweden	691	47	19

=== Elimination round ===
Round of 16
1	Schloesser (NED)	149
16	Benschjöld (SWE)	144
9	Brenk (SLO)	148
8	Bruno (ITA)	149
5	Yamrom (ISR)	144
12	Drakiotis (GRE)	143
13	Szíjártó (HUN)	144
4	Przybylski (POL)	147
3	Girard (FRA)	147
14	Grigaravičius (LTU)	144
11	Lüpkemann (GER)	145
6	Haney (TUR)	149
7	Bošanský (SVK)	146
10	López (ESP)	144
15	Jäätma (EST)	149
2	Fullerton (DEN)	147

Quarterfinals
1	Schloesser (NED)	148^{10}
8	Bruno (ITA)	148^{10+}
5	Yamrom (ISR)	146
4	Przybylski (POL)	149
3	Girard (FRA)	141
6	Haney (TUR)	147
7	Bošanský (SVK)	149
15	Jäätma (EST)	145

Semifinals
8	Bruno (ITA)	145
4	Przybylski (POL)	144
6	Haney (TUR)	145
7	Bošanský (SVK)	147

Gold medal match
8	Bruno (ITA)	144
7	Bošanský (SVK)	146
Bronze medal match
4	Przybylski (POL)	146
6	Haney (TUR)	149
