= Muaythai at the 2023 European Games – Men's 60 kg =

Muaythai competition

Men's 60 kg at the 2023 European Games
- Venue: Myślenice Arena
- Date: 25–28 June
- Competitors: 7 from 7 nations

Medalists
gold medal	Gianny De Leu	Belgium
silver medal	Sercan Koç	Turkey
bronze medal	Vladyslav Mykytas	Ukraine
bronze medal	Narek Khachikyan	Armenia

Men's 60 kg competition at the Muaythai at the 2023 European Games in Kraków, Poland, took place on 25–28 June at the Myślenice Arena.

== Results ==
Quarterfinals
Manh Hung Nguyen (CZE)	27
Vladyslav Mykytas (UKR)	30
Philipp Leon Balbach (GER)
Narek Khachikyan (ARM)	RSCS R3
Mariusz Lach (POL)	27
Gianny De Leu (BEL)	30

Semifinals
Sercan Koç (TUR)	29
Vladyslav Mykytas (UKR)	28
Narek Khachikyan (ARM)	27
Gianny De Leu (BEL)	30

Final
Sercan Koç (TUR)	28
Gianny De Leu (BEL)	29
