= Bosnia and Herzegovina at the 2023 European Games =

- IOC code: BIH
- NOC: Olympic Committee of Bosnia and Herzegovina
- Website: www.okbih.ba

in Kraków, Poland 21 June – 2 July
- Competitors: 55 in 7 sports
- Medals Ranked 38th: Gold 0 Silver 1 Bronze 0 Total 1

European Games appearances (overview)
- 2015; 2019; 2023; 2027

Bosnia and Herzegovina competed at the 2023 European Games in Kraków from 21 June to 2 July 2023. Bosnia and Herzegovina were represented by 55 athletes in 7 sports.

== Medalists ==
Medal	Name	Sport	Event	Date
Silver	Nedžad Husić	Taekwondo	Men's 74kg	25 June

== Competitors ==
Sport	Men	Women	Total
Athletics	19	17	36
Boxing	7	3	10
Canoe slalom	1	0	1
Canoe sprint	1	0	1
Cycling	1	0	1
Karate	1	0	1
Shooting	1	1	2
Taekwondo	2	1	3
Total	33	22	55

== Athletics ==
Bosnia and Herzegovina is set to compete in the third division of the 2023 European Athletics Team Championships which is going to be held in Chorzów during the Games.

=== European Athletics Team Championships First Division ===
Team	Event		Event points																			Total	Rank
Team	Event		100m	200m	400m	800m	1500m	5000m	110m h*	400m h	3000m SC	4 × 100 m	4 × 400 m**	SP	JT	HT	DT	PV	HJ	TJ	LJ	Total	Rank
Bosnia and Herzegovina	Team Championships third Division	Men	9	4	10	15	8	9	12	9	8	12	10	14	15	9	12	10.5	12.5	8	10	363	4
Bosnia and Herzegovina	Team Championships third Division	Women	9	9	8	10	9	7	12	12	7	0	10	10	12	10	10	10	14	8	9	363	4

key: h: hurdles; SC; Steeplechase: SP; Shot put: JT: Javelin: HT: Hammer: DT: Discus: PV: Pole vault: HJ: High jump: TJ: Triple Jump: LJ: Long Jump

- Women compete at 100 metre hurdles, rather than 110 metre hurdles.
- 4 x 400 metres is held as a single mixed sex event

=== Individual events at the 2023 European Games ===
As a participant in the Team event, each nation, including Belgium, automatically enters one athlete in each of the individual 'events'. Medals are awarded at the conclusion of the First Division program.

Event	Male Athlete	Score	Division ranking	Overall ranking	Female athlete	Score	Division ranking	Overall ranking
100 m	Edhem Vikalo	10.84	7	36	Neira Bosnić	12.23	7	39
200 m	Edhem Vikalo	22.54	12	43	Neira Bosnić	24.87	7	38
400 m	Abedin Mujezinović	47.85	6	34	Jelena Gajić	57.94	8	38
800 m	Amel Tuka	1:49.25	1	19	Jelena Gajić	2:11.07	6	36
1500 m	Stefan Ćuković	4:07.24	8	40	Glorija Kureš	4:42.55	7	38
5000 m	Uroš Gutić	14:59.10	7	36	Alma Hrnjić	18:30.94	9	41
110/100 m h	Benjamin Bojanić	15.14	4	34	Maša Garić	14.28	4	=32
400m h	Rusmir Malkočević	55.93	7	35	Maša Garić	1:00.01	4	25
3000m SC	Mlađen Samardžić	10:00.39	8	38	Elma Hasanbašić	13:05.80	9	38
4 × 100 m	Edhem Vikalo; Borislav Dragoljević; Abedin Mujezinović; Egon Savić	41.64	4	30	Ajla Reizbegovic; Emina Omanović; Una Ban; Neira Bosnić	DSQ		
4 × 400 m (mixed)	—				Jovan Rosić; Jelena Gajić; Abedin Mujezinović; Kristina Stojković	3:30.74	6	38
Shot put	Mesud Pezer	20.25	2	9	Gorana Tešanović	13.05	6	37
Javelin	Dejan Mileusnić	71.81	1	20	Aleksandra Vidović	43.18	4	34
Hammer	Samir Vilić	50.62	7	36	Ajla Bašić	53.14	6	34
Discus	Voislav Grubiša	53.64	4	28	Dženisa Gusinac	36.83	6	37
Pole vault	Luka Ivičić	4.00	10	=33	Neira Hadžiahmetagić	2.80	6	34
High jump	Samir Hodžić	1.90	2	=35	Sara Lučić	1.78	2	27
Triple Jump	Sedin Heco	14.29	8	34	Ana Dorotea Markić	11.88	8	37
Long Jump	Stefan Stanković	7.19	6	32	Emina Omanović	5.46	7	37

== Boxing ==
Key:

- W/O – Walkover.
- RSC – Referee stops the contest.

Men

Athlete	Event	Round of 32	Round of 16	Quarterfinals	Semifinals	Final	
Athlete	Event	Opposition Result	Opposition Result	Opposition Result	Opposition Result	Opposition Result	Rank
Leon Vranješ	51 kg	Bye	Ametović (SRB); L RSC (R2 3:00)	Did Not Advance			
Alen Rahimić	57 kg	Bondarchuk (UKR); L 0–5	Did Not Advance				
Wael Mejri	63.5 kg	Rosenov (BUL); L 0–4	Did Not Advance				
Gianni Dedić	71 kg	Kamanin (EST); L 0–5	Did Not Advance				
Leo Cvitanović	80 kg	Aas (EST); L 1–4	Did Not Advance				
Džemal Bošnjak	92 kg	Čalić (CRO); L 0–5	Did Not Advance				
Juraj Soldo	+92 kg	Lenzi (ITA); L 0–5	Did Not Advance				

Women

Athlete	Event	Round of 32	Round of 16	Quarterfinals	Semifinals	Final	
Athlete	Event	Opposition Result	Opposition Result	Opposition Result	Opposition Result	Opposition Result	Rank
Sejla Orascanin	54 kg	Kovalchuk (UKR); L W/O	Did Not Advance				
Ajla Vojic	57 kg	Basanets (UKR); L RSC (R1 2:23)	Did Not Advance				
Tara Bohatjuk	60 kg	Okhrei (UKR); L 0–5	Did Not Advance				

== Canoe Slalom ==
Athlete	Event	Preliminary				Quarterfinal		Semifinal		Final	
Athlete	Event	Run 1	Rank	Run 2	Rank	Time	Rank	Time	Rank	Time	Rank
Emir Abdihodzic	Men's K-1	DSQ		DNS		—		Did Not Advance			
Emir Abdihodzic	Men's kayak cross	78.72	41	—		Did Not Advance					

== Canoe Sprint ==
Athlete	Event	Heats		Semifinals		Final	
Athlete	Event	Time	Rank	Time	Rank	Time	Rank
Jasmin Klebic	Men's C-1 200 m	44.880	17	Did Not Advance			

Qualification Legend: FA = Qualify to final (medal); FB = Qualify to final B (non-medal)

== Cycling ==
=== Mountain bike ===
Men

Athlete	Event	Time	Rank
Vedad Karic	Men's cross country	did not start	

== Karate ==
Men

Kumite

Athlete	Event	Group stage				Semifinals	Final	
Athlete	Event	Opposition Result	Opposition Result	Opposition Result	Rank	Opposition Result	Opposition Result	Rank
Anes Bostandžić	+84 kg	Arkania (GEO); L 4–8	Seck (ESP); L 4–5	Gurbanli (AZE); L 1–9	3	did not advance		

== Shooting ==
Men

Athlete	Event	Qualification		Final	
Athlete	Event	Points	Rank	Points	Rank
Nedžad Džanković	10 m air rifle	613.3	38	did not advance	

Women

Athlete	Event	Qualification		Final	
Athlete	Event	Points	Rank	Points	Rank
Farah Onescuk	10 m air rifle	624.6	26	did not advance	

Mixed

Athlete	Event	Qualification		Final	
Athlete	Event	Points	Rank	Points	Rank
Farah Onescuk; Nedžad Džanković	Mixed team 10 m air rifle	618.4	30	did not advance	

== Taekwondo ==
Athlete	Event	Round of 16	Quarterfinals	Semifinals	Repechage	Final / BM	
Athlete	Event	Opposition Result	Opposition Result	Opposition Result	Opposition Result	Opposition Result	Rank
Nedžad Husić	Men's 74 kg	Binev (BUL); W 2–0	Achab (BEL); W 2–0	Golubić (CRO); W 2–0	—	Kintsurashvili (GEO); L 0–2	2nd place, silver medalist(s)
Dinko Šegedin	Men's 87 kg	Tholiotis (GRE); L 0–2	Did Not Advance				9
Ada Avdagić	Women's 49 kg	Duvančić (CRO); W 2–1	Kisskalt (GER); L 0–2	Did Not Advance			7
