= Muaythai at the 2023 European Games – Women's 60 kg =

Muaythai competition

Women's 60 kg at the 2023 European Games
- Venue: Myślenice Arena
- Date: 25–28 June
- Competitors: 8 from 8 nations

Medalists
gold medal	Astrid Johanna Grents	Estonia
silver medal	Kübra Kocakuş	Turkey
bronze medal	Sarah Piccirillo	Belgium
bronze medal	Dominika Filec	Poland

Women's 60 kg competition at the Muaythai at the 2023 European Games in Kraków, Poland, took place on 25–28 June at the Myślenice Arena.

== Results ==
Quarterfinals
Rebeca Rodríguez (ESP)	27
Sarah Piccirillo (BEL)	30
Kübra Kocakuş (TUR)	30
Ajsa Nardelotti (HUN)	27
Christina Zampoura (GRE)	25
Astrid Johanna Grents (EST)	30
Giulia Pedini (ITA)
Dominika Filec (POL)	RSCS R3

Semifinals
Sarah Piccirillo (BEL)	27
Kübra Kocakuş (TUR)	30
Astrid Johanna Grents (EST)	29
Dominika Filec (POL)	28

Final
Kübra Kocakuş (TUR)	27
Astrid Johanna Grents (EST)	30
