= Ezgi =

Ezgi may refer to:

== People ==
=== Given names ===
- Ezgi Asaroğlu (born 1987), Turkish film and television actress
- Ezgi Çağlar (born 1991), Turkish goalkeeper
- Ezgi Dağdelenler (born 1993), Turkish volleyball player
- Ezgi Dilik (born 1995), Turkish volleyball player
- Ezgi Eyüboğlu (born 1988), Turkish actress
- Ezgi Gör (born 2003), Turkish actress
- Ezgi Gunuc (born 1988), Turkish musician and composer
- Ezgi Kaya (born 2001), Turkish long-distance runner
- Ezgi Keleş (born 2002), Turkish muaythai practitioner
- Ezgi Mola (born 1983), Turkish actress

=== Surname ===
- Suphi Ezgi (1869 – 1962), Ottoman military physician, musician, musicologist and composer.

== Music ==
- Ezginin Günlüğü, Turkish music group which was formed in 1981
