= Muaythai at the 2023 European Games – Women's 63.5 kg =

Muaythai competition

Women's 63.5 kg at the 2023 European Games
- Venue: Myślenice Arena
- Date: 25–28 June
- Competitors: 8 from 8 nations

Medalists
gold medal	Bediha Tacyıldız	Turkey
silver medal	Tereza Štechová	Czech Republic
bronze medal	Emili Rzayeva	Azerbaijan
bronze medal	Chonlathorn Mingsupphakun	Finland

Women's 63.5 kg competition at the Muaythai at the 2023 European Games in Kraków, Poland, took place on 25–28 June at the Myślenice Arena.

== Results ==
Quarterfinals
Nora Cornolle (FRA)
Emili Rzayeva (AZE)	WO
Lusi Ter Davtyan (ARM)
Tereza Štechová (CZE)	CCL R2
Bediha Tacyıldız (TUR)	30
Marija Bodač (CRO)	27
Sandra Bołkowska (POL)	27
Chonlathorn Mingsupphakun (FIN)	30

Semifinals
Emili Rzayeva (AZE)
Tereza Štechová (CZE)	RSCS R3
Bediha Tacyıldız (TUR)	30
Chonlathorn Mingsupphakun (FIN)	27

Final
Tereza Štechová (CZE)	27
Bediha Tacyıldız (TUR)	30
