= Muaythai at the 2023 European Games – Women's 54 kg =

Muaythai competition

Women's 54 kg at the 2023 European Games
- Venue: Myślenice Arena
- Date: 25–28 June
- Competitors: 8 from 8 nations

Medalists
gold medal	Martyna Kierczyńska	Poland
silver medal	Axana Depypere	Belgium
bronze medal	Elene Loladze	Georgia
bronze medal	Ezgi Keleş	Turkey

Women's 54 kg competition at the Muaythai at the 2023 European Games in Kraków, Poland, took place on 25–28 June at the Myślenice Arena.

== Results ==
Quarterfinals
Viktorie Bulínová (CZE)	27
Martyna Kierczyńska (POL)	30
Filipa Lopes Oliveira (POR)	27
Elene Loladze (GEO)	30
Ezgi Keleş (TUR)	30
Aurore Dos Santos (FRA)	27
Axana Depypere (BEL)	30
Lara Fernandez Martinez (ESP)	27

Semifinals
Martyna Kierczyńska (POL)	29
Elene Loladze (GEO)	28
Ezgi Keleş (TUR)	27
Axana Depypere (BEL)	30

Final
Martyna Kierczyńska (POL)	30
Axana Depypere (BEL)	27
