= Muaythai at the 2023 European Games – Men's 81 kg =

Muaythai competition

Men's 81 kg at the 2023 European Games
- Venue: Myślenice Arena
- Date: 25–28 June
- Competitors: 8 from 8 nations

Medalists
gold medal	Artiom Livadari	Moldova
silver medal	Yehor Skurikhin	Ukraine
bronze medal	Enis Yunusoğlu	Turkey
bronze medal	Ondřej Malina	Czech Republic

Men's 81 kg competition at the Muaythai at the 2023 European Games in Kraków, Poland, took place on 25–28 June at the Myślenice Arena.

== Results ==
Quarterfinals
Enis Yunusoğlu (TUR)	RET R2
Domenico Caravello (ITA)
Bilal Bakhouche-Chareuf (FRA)	27
Artiom Livadari (MDA)	30
Jan-Lucas Soentgen (GER)	27
Ondřej Malina (CZE)	RSCS R3
Yehor Skurikhin (UKR)	30
Rafał Radosz (POL)	27

Semifinals
Enis Yunusoğlu (TUR)	28
Artiom Livadari (MDA)	29
Ondřej Malina (CZE)	27
Yehor Skurikhin (UKR)	30

Final
Artiom Livadari (MDA)	30
Yehor Skurikhin (UKR)	27
