= Boxing at the 2023 European Games =

Boxing competitions

- Venue: Nowy Targ Arena
- Dates: 23 June – 2 July
- Competitors: 319 from 43 nations

Boxing competition at the 2023 European Games took place from 23 June to 2 July 2023 at the Nowy Targ Arena. There was 13 competitions.

44 quota places (22 for women and 22 for men) for the Paris 2024 Olympic Games were available at the 2023 European Games. The number of available quota places per event is specified in the IOC Boxing Qualification System for Paris 2024.

== Medal table ==
* Host nation (Poland)

Rank	NOC	Gold	Silver	Bronze	Total
1	France	3	2	2	7
2	Turkey	2	1	3	6
3	Ireland	2	1	2	5
4	Bulgaria	2	1	1	4
5	Italy	1	0	4	5
6	Great Britain	1	0	3	4
7	Denmark	1	0	0	1
7	Ukraine	1	0	0	1
9	Serbia	0	2	0	2
10	Spain	0	1	2	3
11	Azerbaijan	0	1	1	2
11	Belgium	0	1	1	2
13	Croatia	0	1	0	1
13	Georgia	0	1	0	1
13	Romania	0	1	0	1
16	Germany	0	0	2	2
16	Hungary	0	0	2	2
16	Poland*	0	0	2	2
19	Sweden	0	0	1	1
Totals (19 entries)		13	13	26	52

== Medalists ==
In events with two Olympic quota places available, the gold and silver medalists will qualify for Paris 2024, and semi-finals will represent Olympic qualification deciders. In events where four quota places are available, all medalists will qualify for Paris 2024, and quarter-finals will therefore represent Olympic qualification deciders.

=== Men's events ===
Event	Gold	Silver	Bronze	2024 OG Quotas
Flyweight (51 kg)	Billal Bennama; France	Samet Gümüş; Turkey	Kiaran MacDonald; Great Britain	France; Turkey
Flyweight (51 kg)	Billal Bennama; France	Samet Gümüş; Turkey	Federico Serra; Italy	France; Turkey
Featherweight (57 kg)	Javier Ibáñez; Bulgaria	José Quiles; Spain	Nebil Ibrahim; Sweden	Belgium; Bulgaria; Spain; Sweden
Featherweight (57 kg)	Javier Ibáñez; Bulgaria	José Quiles; Spain	Vasile Usturoi; Belgium	Belgium; Bulgaria; Spain; Sweden
Light welterweight (63.5 kg)	Sofiane Oumiha; France	Lasha Guruli; Georgia	Dean Clancy; Ireland	France; Georgia; Hungary; Ireland
Light welterweight (63.5 kg)	Sofiane Oumiha; France	Lasha Guruli; Georgia	Richárd Kovács; Hungary	France; Georgia; Hungary; Ireland
Light middleweight (71 kg)	Nikolai Terteryan; Denmark	Vahid Abasov; Serbia	Tuğrulhan Erdemir; Turkey	Denmark; France; Serbia; Turkey
Light middleweight (71 kg)	Nikolai Terteryan; Denmark	Vahid Abasov; Serbia	Makan Traoré; France	Denmark; France; Serbia; Turkey
Light heavyweight (80 kg)	Oleksandr Khyzhniak; Ukraine	Gabrijel Veočić; Croatia	Salvatore Cavallaro; Italy	Azerbaijan; Croatia; Italy; Ukraine
Light heavyweight (80 kg)	Oleksandr Khyzhniak; Ukraine	Gabrijel Veočić; Croatia	Murad Allahverdiyev; Azerbaijan	Azerbaijan; Croatia; Italy; Ukraine
Heavyweight (92 kg)	Aziz Abbes Mouhiidine; Italy	Jack Marley; Ireland	Mateusz Bereźnicki; Poland	Ireland; Italy
Heavyweight (92 kg)	Aziz Abbes Mouhiidine; Italy	Jack Marley; Ireland	Enmanuel Reyes; Spain	Ireland; Italy
Super heavyweight (+92 kg)	Delicious Orie; Great Britain	Mahammad Abdullayev; Azerbaijan	Yordan Hernández; Bulgaria	Azerbaijan; Great Britain
Super heavyweight (+92 kg)	Delicious Orie; Great Britain	Mahammad Abdullayev; Azerbaijan	Nelvie Tiafack; Germany	Azerbaijan; Great Britain

=== Women's events ===
Event	Gold	Silver	Bronze	2024 OG Quotas
Light flyweight (50 kg)	Buse Naz Çakıroğlu; Turkey	Wassila Lkhadiri; France	Giordana Sorrentino; Italy	France; Italy; Spain; Turkey
Light flyweight (50 kg)	Buse Naz Çakıroğlu; Turkey	Wassila Lkhadiri; France	Laura Fuertes; Spain	France; Italy; Spain; Turkey
Bantamweight (54 kg)	Stanimira Petrova; Bulgaria	Lăcrămioara Perijoc; Romania	Charley Davison; Great Britain	Bulgaria; Great Britain; Romania; Turkey
Bantamweight (54 kg)	Stanimira Petrova; Bulgaria	Lăcrămioara Perijoc; Romania	Hatice Akbaş; Turkey	Bulgaria; Great Britain; Romania; Turkey
Featherweight (57 kg)	Amina Zidani; France	Svetlana Staneva; Bulgaria	Michaela Walsh; Ireland	Bulgaria; France; Ireland; Italy
Featherweight (57 kg)	Amina Zidani; France	Svetlana Staneva; Bulgaria	Irma Testa; Italy	Bulgaria; France; Ireland; Italy
Lightweight (60 kg)	Kellie Harrington; Ireland	Natalia Shadrina; Serbia	Estelle Mossely; France	France; Ireland; Serbia; Turkey
Lightweight (60 kg)	Kellie Harrington; Ireland	Natalia Shadrina; Serbia	Gizem Özer; Turkey	France; Ireland; Serbia; Turkey
Welterweight (66 kg)	Busenaz Sürmeneli; Turkey	Oshin Derieuw; Belgium	Rosie Eccles; Great Britain	Belgium; Great Britain; Hungary; Turkey
Welterweight (66 kg)	Busenaz Sürmeneli; Turkey	Oshin Derieuw; Belgium	Luca Anna Hámori; Hungary	Belgium; Great Britain; Hungary; Turkey
Middleweight (75 kg)	Aoife O'Rourke; Ireland	Davina Michel; France	Elżbieta Wójcik; Poland	France; Ireland
Middleweight (75 kg)	Aoife O'Rourke; Ireland	Davina Michel; France	Irina Schönberger; Germany	France; Ireland

== Paris 2024 qualification ==
The following quota places have been won at the 2023 European Games by the listed National Olympic Committees.

NOC	Men							Women						Total
NOC	51 kg	57 kg	63.5 kg	71 kg	80 kg	92 kg	+92 kg	50 kg	54 kg	57 kg	60 kg	66 kg	75 kg	Total
Azerbaijan					X		X							2
Belgium		X										X		2
Bulgaria		X							X	X				3
Croatia					X									1
Denmark				X										1
France (Note: France's host nation places will now go to World Qualifiers.)	X		X	X				X		X	X		X	7
Georgia			X											1
Great Britain							X		X			X		3
Hungary			X									X		2
Ireland			X			X				X	X		X	5
Italy					X	X		X		X				4
Romania									X					1
Serbia				X							X			2
Spain		X						X						2
Sweden		X												1
Turkey	X			X				X	X		X	X		6
Ukraine					X									1
17 NOCs	2	4	4	4	4	2	2	4	4	4	4	4	2	44

== Participating nations ==
A total of 319 athletes from 43 nations competed in boxing at the 2023 European Games:

NOC	Men							Women						Total
NOC	51 kg	57 kg	63.5 kg	71 kg	80 kg	92 kg	+92 kg	50 kg	54 kg	57 kg	60 kg	66 kg	75 kg	Total
Albania		X		X	X	X								4
Armenia	X	X	X	X	X	X	X	X	X	X	X	X	X	13
Austria			X	X										2
Azerbaijan	X	X	X	X	X	X	X	X	X	X		X	X	12
Belgium		X							X			X		3
Bosnia and Herzegovina	X	X	X	X	X	X	X		X	X	X			10
Bulgaria	X	X	X	X	X		X	X	X	X	X			10
Croatia			X	X	X	X	X		X	X	X			8
Cyprus			X	X										2
Czech Republic		X	X	X	X	X	X	X	X	X	X	X	X	12
Denmark		X	X	X				X		X				5
EOC Refugee Team		X											X	2
Estonia	X	X	X	X	X									5
Finland					X			X	X	X	X			5
France	X	X	X	X	X	X	X	X	X	X	X	X	X	13
Georgia	X	X	X	X	X	X	X		X					8
Germany	X	X	X	X	X	X	X	X		X	X	X	X	12
Great Britain	X	X	X	X	X	X	X	X	X	X	X	X	X	13
Greece				X	X	X	X		X	X		X	X	8
Hungary	X	X	X	X	X	X	X	X	X			X	X	11
Ireland	X	X	X	X	X	X		X	X	X	X	X	X	12
Israel	X		X	X	X	X								5
Italy	X	X	X	X	X	X	X	X	X	X	X	X	X	13
Kosovo	X		X	X	X	X	X				X			7
Latvia		X	X	X	X							X		5
Lithuania			X	X	X	X	X				X	X	X	8
Luxembourg						X								1
Moldova	X	X	X	X	X	X	X		X		X			9
Montenegro				X	X				X					3
Netherlands				X	X		X				X	X		5
North Macedonia		X	X		X									3
Norway			X	X	X		X					X	X	6
Poland	X	X	X	X	X	X	X	X	X	X	X	X	X	13
Portugal				X				X						2
Romania		X		X	X				X	X	X			6
Serbia	X		X	X	X		X	X	X	X	X	X	X	11
Slovakia			X	X		X		X			X		X	6
Slovenia			X	X			X							3
Spain	X	X	X	X	X	X	X	X	X	X	X			11
Sweden		X							X		X		X	4
Switzerland										X	X			2
Turkey	X	X	X	X	X	X	X	X	X	X	X	X	X	13
Ukraine	X	X	X	X	X	X	X	X	X	X	X	X	X	13
43 NOCs	20	26	31	36	32	24	24	19	24	21	24	19	19	319
