= Shooting at the 2023 European Games – Men's 10 metre air pistol =

Men's 10 metre air pistol at the 2023 European Games
- Venue: Wrocław Shooting Centre
- Dates: 22 June
- Competitors: 36 from 25 nations

Medalists
gold medal	İsmail Keleş	Turkey
silver medal	Robin Walter	Germany
bronze medal	Paolo Monna	Italy

The men's 10 metre air pistol event at the 2023 European Games took place on 22 June at the Wrocław Shooting Centre.

== Records ==
Prior to this competition, the existing world, European and Games records were as follows.

Qualification
World Record	Jin Jong-oh (KOR)	594	Changwon, South Korea	12 April 2009
European Record	Sergei Pyzhianov (URS)	593	Munich, West Germany	13 October 1989
Games Record	Artem Chernousov (RUS)	585	Minsk, Belarus	23 June 2019

== Results ==
=== Qualification ===
Rank	Athlete	Country	1	2	3	4	5	6	Total	Notes
1	Lauris Strautmanis	Latvia	99	95	98	98	96	97	583-24x	Q
2	Paolo Monna	Italy	97	94	100	98	98	96	583-15x	Q
3	Damir Mikec	Serbia	97	97	98	95	97	98	582-21x	Q
4	Robin Walter	Germany	97	96	97	99	97	94	580-19x	Q
5	Ole-Harald Aas	Norway	99	96	96	97	96	96	580-14x	Q
6	İsmail Keleş	Turkey	96	95	96	96	99	97	579-20x	Q
7	Morgan Johansson Cropper	Sweden	95	96	96	96	100	96	579-17x	Q
8	João Costa	Portugal	96	97	99	98	95	93	578-19x	Q
9	Jason Solari	Switzerland	96	97	97	96	98	93	577-23x	
10	Federico Maldini	Italy	98	97	97	95	96	94	577-21x	
11	Ruslan Lunev	Azerbaijan	95	97	97	96	95	97	577-18x	
12	Richard Zechmeister	Austria	94	96	98	99	95	95	577-17x	
13	Frederik Larsen	Denmark	97	96	96	97	97	94	577-15x	
14	James Miller	Great Britain	93	94	97	97	97	99	577-14x	
15	Samuil Donkov	Bulgaria	98	94	97	95	96	96	576-19x	
16	Viktor Bankin	Ukraine	96	94	96	97	97	95	575-24x	
17	Yusuf Dikeç	Turkey	93	96	97	96	96	97	575-20x	
18	Pavlo Korostylov	Ukraine	97	96	94	95	98	95	575-20x	
19	Emīls Vasermanis	Latvia	95	96	96	95	95	98	575-18x	
20	Jindřich Dubový	Czech Republic	95	95	96	94	99	96	575-17x	
21	Michael Schwald	Germany	98	95	96	95	94	97	575-15x	
22	Benik Khlghatyan	Armenia	92	95	98	95	96	97	573-17x	
23	Dionysios Korakakis	Greece	93	96	95	96	95	98	573-16x	
24	Pavel Schejbal	Czech Republic	97	93	97	95	96	95	573-16x	
25	Dimitrije Grgić	Serbia	95	94	95	100	91	97	572-14x	
26	Florian Fouquet	France	96	96	95	96	96	92	571-15x	
27	Martín Freije	Spain	97	95	95	95	94	95	571-14x	
28	Grzegorz Długosz	Poland	95	94	96	96	98	92	571-10x	
29	Kristian Callaghan	Great Britain	95	94	97	95	93	96	570-18x	
30	Oskar Miliwek	Poland	97	90	96	95	97	94	569- 8x	
31	Nexhat Sahiti	Kosovo	91	97	94	99	93	94	568-18x	
32	Juraj Tužinský	Slovakia	96	95	94	95	94	94	568- 9x	
33	Miklós Tátrai-Fejes	Hungary	91	97	94	98	92	95	567-15x	
34	Kako Mosulishvili	Georgia	93	92	95	97	95	93	565-11x	
35	Levan Kadagidze	Georgia	95	92	95	95	93	94	564-11x	
36	Daniel Kral	Austria	92	94	91	95	94	96	562-18x	

=== Ranking match ===
Rank	Athlete	Series					Total	Notes
Rank	Athlete	1	2	3	4	5	Total	Notes
1	Robin Walter (GER)	51.9	49.7	49.5	49.2	51.7	252.0	QG
1	Robin Walter (GER)	51.9	101.6	151.1	200.3	252.0	252.0	QG
2	İsmail Keleş (TUR)	49.5	48.7	50.8	49.9	49.3	248.2	QG
2	İsmail Keleş (TUR)	49.5	98.2	149.0	198.9	248.2	248.2	QG
3rd place, bronze medalist(s)	Paolo Monna (ITA)	49.7	48.7	49.6	51.1	47.9	247.0	
3rd place, bronze medalist(s)	Paolo Monna (ITA)	49.7	98.4	148.0	199.1	247.0	247.0	
4	Damir Mikec (SRB)	49.7	48.8	49.5	49.2	48.3	245.5	
4	Damir Mikec (SRB)	49.7	98.5	148.0	197.2	245.5	245.5	
5	João Costa (POR)	48.7	49.0	50.6	48.8		197.1	
5	João Costa (POR)	48.7	97.7	148.3	197.1		197.1	
6	Ole-Harald Aas (NOR)	49.4	51.3	49.7	46.5		196.9	
6	Ole-Harald Aas (NOR)	49.4	100.7	150.4	196.9		196.9	
7	Lauris Strautmanis (LAT)	49.2	48.5	49.6			147.3	
7	Lauris Strautmanis (LAT)	49.2	97.7	147.3			147.3	
8	Morgan Johansson Cropper (SWE)	49.0	49.8	47.2			146.0	
8	Morgan Johansson Cropper (SWE)	49.0	98.8	146.0			146.0	

=== Gold medal match ===
Rank	Athlete	Shot															Total
Rank	Athlete	1	2	3	4	5	6	7	8	9	10	11	12	13	14	15	Total
1st place, gold medalist(s)	İsmail Keleş (TUR)	10.2	10.3	9.1	9.8	9.8	10.4	10.0	10.6	9.9	10.0	10.3	10.7	10.4	9.9	10.5	17
2nd place, silver medalist(s)	Robin Walter (GER)	9.0	9.2	9.6	10.2	10.5	10.5	9.5	10.6	10.5	9.4	10.8	9.6	9.9	9.8	9.4	13
