= Belgium at the 2023 European Games =

- IOC code: BEL
- NOC: Belgian Olympic and Interfederal Committee
- Website: teambelgium.be

in Kraków and Małopolska, Poland 21 June 2023 – 2 July 2023
- Competitors: 138 in 21 sports
- Flag bearers: Kevin Borlée & Camille Laus (athletics)(opening); Oshin Derieuw (boxing) (closing)
- Medals: Gold 2 Silver 5 Bronze 6 Total 13

European Games appearances (overview)
- 2015; 2019; 2023; 2027

Belgium competed at the 2023 European Games, in Kraków, Poland from 21 June to 2 July 2023. Belgium has previously competed at the 2015 European Games in Baku, Azerbaijan and at the 2019 European Games in Minsk, Belarus The Belgian Olympic and Interfederal Committee sent a total of 138 athletes to the Games to compete in 21 sports.

== Medalists ==
Medal	Name	Sport	Event	Date
1st place, gold medalist(s)	Sarah Chaâri	Taekwondo	Women's 62 kg	25 june 2023
1st place, gold medalist(s)	Gianny De Leu	Muaythai	Men's 60 kg	27 june 2023
2nd place, silver medalist(s)	Bryan De Valck; Caspar Augustijnen; Denis Donkor; Thibaut Vervoort	Basketball	Men's 3X3	24 june 2023
2nd place, silver medalist(s)	Rani Rosius	Athletics	Women's 100 metres	23 june 2023
2nd place, silver medalist(s)	Thomas Carmoy	Athletics	Men's high jump	25 june 2023
2nd place, silver medalist(s)	Axana Depypere	Muaythai	Women's 54 kg	27 june 2023
2nd place, silver medalist(s)	Oshin Derieuw	Boxing	Women's welterweight	1 july 2023
3rd place, bronze medalist(s)	Quentin Mahauden	Karate	Men's kumite 75 kg	23 june 2023
3rd place, bronze medalist(s)	Dylan Borlée; Jonathan Sacoor; Cynthia Bolingo; Camille Laus	Athletics	Mixed 4X400 metres	25 june 2023
3rd place, bronze medalist(s)	Sarah Piccirillo	Muaythai	Women's 60 kg	26 june 2023
3rd place, bronze medalist(s)	Stef Van Campenhout	Fencing	Men's Foil	26 june 2023
3rd place, bronze medalist(s)	Jolien Vermeylen	Triathlon	Women's Triathlon	27 june 2023
3rd place, bronze medalist(s)	Vasile Usturoi	Boxing	Men's featherweight	30 june 2023

== Archery ==
Athlete	Event	Ranking round		Round of 64	Round of 32	Round of 16	Quarterfinals	Semifinals	Final / BM	
Athlete	Event	Score	Seed	Opposition Score	Opposition Score	Opposition Score	Opposition Score	Opposition Score	Opposition Score	Rank
Jarno De Smedt	Men's individual recurve	673	13	Bye	Bernardi (FRA); L 3-7	Did Not Advance				17
Charlotte Destrooper	Women's individual recurve	602	41	Degn (DEN); L 2-6	Did Not Advance					33
Sarah Prieels	Women's individual compound	707	4	—		Nisula (FIN); L 142-143	Did Not Advance			9
Jarno De Smedt; Charlotte Destrooper	Mixed team recurve	1275	18	—	Barankova/Duchon (SVK); W 4-5	Healy/Orton (GBR); L 1-5	Did Not Advance			9

== Artistic swimming ==
Athlete	Event		
Athlete	Event	Points	Rank
Lisa Ingenito; Renaud Barral	Mixed duet technical	173.0366	6
Lisa Ingenito; Renaud Barral	Mixed duet free	139.7814	5

== Athletics ==
Belgium is set to compete in the first division of the 2023 European Athletics Team Championships which is going to be held in Chorzów during, and as part of, the Games. Belgium will compete in the team event, and each athlete will also be eligible for the individual event medals.

=== European Athletics Team Championships First Division ===
Team	Event		Event points ***																			Total points	Rank
Team	Event		100m	200m	400m	800m	1500m	5000m	110m h*	400m h	3000m SC	4 × 100 m	4 × 400 m**	SP	JT	HT	DT	PV	HJ	TJ	LJ	Total points	Rank
Belgium	Team Championships First Division	Men	3	2	9	2	7	8	3	12	9	7	14	1	15	2	2	7	15	2	3	250	14
Belgium	Team Championships First Division	Women	15	7	14	8	6	7	2	0	1	9	14	10	2	10	3	13	15	3	5	250	14

key: h: hurdles; SC; Steeplechase: SP; Shot put: JT: Javelin: HT: Hammer: DT: Discus: PV: Pole vault: HJ: High jump: TJ: Triple Jump: LJ: Long Jump

- Women compete at 100 metre hurdles, rather than 110 metre hurdles.
- 4 x 400 metres is held as a single mixed sex event
- Event points indicate placings in the First Division match. Individual medals are across all three divisions.

=== Individual events at the 2023 European Games ===
As a participant in the Team event, each nation, including Belgium, automatically enters one athlete in each of the individual 'events'. Medals are awarded at the conclusion of the First Division program.

Event	Male Athlete	Score	Division ranking	Overall ranking	Female athlete	Score	Division ranking	Overall ranking
100 m	Kobe Vleminckx	10.51	14	22	Rani Rosius	11.20	2	2nd place, silver medalist(s)
200 m	Christian Iguacel	21.34	15	30	Imke Vervaet	23.27	10	14
400 m	Dylan Borlée	45.84	8	15	Cynthia Bolingo	50.95	3	4
800 m	Pieter Claus	1:50.03	15	26	Camille Laus	2:02.28	9	16
1500 m	Stijn Baeten	3:41.53	10	11	Elise Vanderelst	4:14.63	11	18
5000 m	Enzo Noel	14:02.78	9	13	Lisa Rooms	15:44.24	10	16
110/100 m h	Nolan Vancauwemberghe	14.00	14	21	Jolien Boumkwo^{1}	32.81	15	44
400m h	Julien Watrin	49.56	5	8	Hanne Claes	Did Not Start		
3000m SC	Clement Deflandre	8:36.23	8	8	Jolien Van Hoorebeke	10:32.28	16	26
4 × 100 m	Amine Kasmi; Jordan Paquot; Antoine Snyders; Rendel Vermeulen; Kobe Vleminckx	39.41	10	12	Janie De Naeyer; Elise Mehuys; Rani Rosius; Rani Vincke	43.84	8	9
4 × 400 m (mixed)	—				Dylan Borlée; Jonathan Sacoor; Cynthia Bolingo; Camille Laus	3:12.97	3	3rd place, bronze medalist(s)
Shot put	Andreas De Lathauwer	16.67	16	32	Jolien Boumkwo	16.58	7	10
Javelin	Timothy Herman	81.67	2	4	Pauline Smal	47.24	15	25
Hammer	Rémi Malengreaux	56.67	15	31	Vanessa Sterckendries	67.95	7	9
Discus	Lars Coene	50.52	15	33	Katelijne Lyssens	48.04	14	28
Pole vault	Ben Broeders	5.45	10	10	Ellen Vekemans	4.50	4	5
High jump	Thomas Carmoy	2.29	2	2nd place, silver medalist(s)	Merel Maes	1.92	2	4
Triple Jump	Björn De Decker	14.08	15	37	Saliyya Guisse	12.69	14	27
Long Jump	Yanni Sampson	7.24	14	34	Maité Beernaert	6.10	12	21

^{1}Jolien Boumkwo, a shot putter, filled in at the last moment for the injured Anne Zagré.

== Badminton ==
Athlete	Event	Group stage				Round of 16	Quarterfinals	Semifinals	Finals	
Athlete	Event	Opposition Score	Opposition Score	Opposition Score	Rank	Opposition Score	Opposition Score	Opposition Score	Opposition Score	Rank
Julien Carraggi	Men's singles	Wraber (AUT); W 2-0	Schäfer (GER); W 2-1	Louda (CZE); W 2-0	1 Q	Barth (NOR); W 2-1	Popov (FRA); L 0-2	Did Not Advance		5
Lianne Tan	Women's singles	Hamza (ITA); W 2-0	Sándorházi (HUN); W 2-0	Nyqvist (FIN); W 2-0	1 Q	Švábíková (CZE); W 2-0	Stadelmann (SUI); L 1-2	Did Not Advance		5

== Basketball ==
Team	Event	Group stage				Quarterfinals	Semifinals	Final / BM	
Team	Event	Opposition Score	Opposition Score	Opposition Score	Rank	Opposition Score	Opposition Score	Opposition Score	Rank
Bryan De Valck; Caspar Augustijnen^{1} Denis Donkor; Thibaut Vervoort	Men's tournament	Slovenia; W 21-8	Latvia; L 16-21	Spain; W 21-14	2 Q	Austria; W 21-20	Germany; W 21-15	Latvia; L 19-11	2nd place, silver medalist(s)

^{1}injured in the 1st game against Slovenia and out for the rest of the tournament.

== Boxing ==
Athlete	Event	Round of 32	Round of 16	Quarterfinals	Semifinals	Final	
Athlete	Event	Opposition Result	Opposition Result	Opposition Result	Opposition Result	Opposition Result	Rank
Vasile Usturoi	Men's featherweight	Bye	Murja (ALB); W 5-0	Jensen (DEN); W RSC	Quiles Brotons (ESP); L 0-5	Did Not Advance	3rd place, bronze medalist(s)
Mayssen Lambot	Women's bantamweight	Coroli (MDA); W 5-0	Milli (SWE); L 0-5	Did Not Advance			
Oshin Derieuw	Women's welterweight	Bye	Allahverdiyeva (AZE); W 5-0	Sonvico (FRA); W 3-2	Hámori (HUN); W 5-0	Sürmeneli (TUR); L 0-5	2nd place, silver medalist(s)

== Breakdancing ==
Athlete	Event	Group stage				Quarterfinals	Semifinals	Final	
Athlete	Event	Opposition Score	Opposition Score	Opposition Score	Rank	Opposition Score	Opposition Score	Opposition Score	Rank
Cis Backeljau (Cis)	B-Boys	Lil Zoo (AUT); L 0–2	Xak (ESP); W 2–0	Kuzya (UKR); L 0-2	3	Did Not Advance			
Lucas El Raghibi (Lucky)	B-Boys	Sunni (GBR); L 0-2	Wigor (POL); L 0-2	Menno (NED); L 0–2	4	Did Not Advance			
Maxime Blieck (MADMAX)	B-Girls	Nicka (LTU); L 0–2	Paulina (POL); W 2-0	Jilou (GER); L 0–2	3	Did Not Advance			
Camine Van Hoof (CAMINE)	B-Girls	Nadia (ISR); D 1–1	Stefani (UKR); L 0–2	Vanessa (POR); L 0-2	4	Did Not Advance			

== Canoe Slalom ==
Athlete	Event	Preliminary				Quarterfinal		Semifinal		Final	
Athlete	Event	Run 1	Rank	Run 2	Rank	Time	Rank	Time	Rank	Time	Rank
Gabriel De Coster	Men's K-1	90.71	29 Q	Bye		—		97.58	27	Did Not Advance	
Gabriel De Coster	Men's kayak cross	71.52	44	—		Did Not Advance					

== Canoe Sprint ==
Athlete	Event	Heats		Semifinal		Final	
Athlete	Event	Time	Rank	Time	Rank	Time	Rank
Artuur Peters; Bram Sikkens	Men's K2 500m	1:30.958	3	1:32.176	1 Q	1:30.773	6
Lize Broekx; Hermien Peters	Women's K2 500m	1:41.734	2 Q	—		1:43.768	6

== Cycling ==
Athlete	Event	Time	Rank
Pierre De Froidmont	Men's mountainbike	1:20:35	6
Jens Schuermans	Men's mountainbike	1:22:19	21
Clement Horny	Men's mountainbike	1:23:43	33
Arne Janssens	Men's mountainbike	1:25:14	40
Emeline Detilleux	Women's mountainbike	1:22:39	16
Githa Michiels	Women's mountainbike	1 Lap	46

== Fencing ==
Athlete	Event	Preliminaries	Round of 128	Round of 64	Round of 32	Round of 16	Quarterfinal	Semifinal	Final	
Athlete	Event	W/B	Opposition Result	Opposition Result	Opposition Result	Opposition Result	Opposition Result	Opposition Result	Opposition Result	Rank
Stef De Greef	Men's individual foil	5/5	—	Bye	Kontochristopoulos (GRE); W 15-6	Rzadkowski (POL); W 15-12	Siess (POL); L 11-15	Did Not Advance		5
Mathieu Nijs	Men's individual foil	3/6	—	Breteau Iannuzzi (ESP); W 15-12	Van Campenhout (BEL); L 13-15	Did Not Advance				30
Oscar Geudvert	Men's individual foil	3/6	—	Davis (GBR); L 10-15	Did Not Advance					48
Stef Van Campenhout	Men's individual foil	5/6	—	Manolikas (GRE); W 15-3	Nijs (BEL); W 15-13	Mepstead (GBR); W MED	Choupenitch (CZE); W 15-14	Siess (POL); L 7-15	Did Not Advance	3rd place, bronze medalist(s)
Neisser Loyola	Men's individual épée	5/6	Bye	Sych (UKR); W 15-11	Nycz (POL); L 11-12	Did Not Advance				21
Marc Housieaux	Men's individual épée	5/6	Bye	Cimborevics (LAT); W 15-13	Bargues Fuentes (ESP); L 14-15	Did Not Advance				19
Felix Blommaert	Men's individual épée	2/6	Did Not Advance							76
Francois-Xavier Ferot	Men's individual épée	2/5	Johanides (SVK); W 15-10	Unterhauser (GER); L 13-15	Did Not Advance					61
Delphine Groslambert	Women's individual foil	2/6	—	Chaldaiou (GRE); L 3-15	Did Not Advance					35
Solane Beken	Women's individual épée	3/6	—	Toth (HUN); L 10-13	Did Not Advance					48
Aube Vandingenen	Women's individual épée	4/6	—	Muhari (HUN); L 7-15	Did Not Advance					34
Anne Bultynck	Women's individual épée	1/5	—	Did Not Advance						61
Jolien Corteyn	Women's individual sabre	4/6	—	Bye	Passaro (ITA); L 9-15	Did Not Advance				23
Stef Van Campenhout; Mathieu Nijs; Stef De Greef	Men's team foil	—				Spain; W 45-41	France; L 38-45	Poland; L 25-45	Ukraine; W 45-39	7
Marc Housieaux; Neisser Loyola; Francois-Xavier Ferot	Men's team épée	—			Portugal; W 45-43	Italy; L 16-45	Germany; L 33-45	Sweden; L 38-45	Austria; W 45-33	15
Aube Vandingen; Anne Bultynck; Solane Beken	Women's team épée	—			Lithuania; L 35-45	Did Not Advance				17

== Karate ==
Athlete	Event	Group stage			Semifinal	Final / BM	
Athlete	Event	Opposition Score	Opposition Score	Opposition Score	Opposition Score	Opposition Score	Rank
Quentin Mahauden	Men's kumite -75 kg	Eltemur (TUR); L 5-10	Drazewski (POL); W 7-0	Wilkins (GBR); W 6-3	Zaplitnyi (UKR); L 4-5	Did Not Advance	3rd place, bronze medalist(s)

== Modern Pentathlon ==
Athlete	Event	Qualification								Semifinal								Final									
Athlete	Event	Fencing		Swimming		Laser Run		Total points	Rank	Fencing		Swimming		Laser Run		Total points	Rank	Show Jumping		Fencing		Swimming		Laser Run		Total points	Rank
Athlete	Event	W/L	Points	Result	Points	Result	Points	Total points	Rank	W/L	Points	Result	Points	Result	Points	Total points	Rank	Result	Points	W/L	Points	Result	Points	Result	Points	Total points	Rank
Anais Eudes	Women's individual	16/12	222	2:17.23	276	11:59.80	581	1079	5 Q	19/16	220	2:19.09	272	11:32.60	608	1102	10	Did Not Advance									

== Muaythai ==
Athlete	Event	Quarterfinal	Semifinal	Final	Rank
Athlete	Event	Opposition Result	Opposition Result	Opposition Result	Rank
Gianny De Leu	Men's -60 kg	Lach (POL); W 30-27	Khachikyan (ARM); W 30-27	Koc (TUR); W 30-27	1st place, gold medalist(s)
Axana Depypere	Women's -54 kg	Fernandez Martinez (ESP); W 30-27	Keles (TUR); W 30-27	Kierczynska (POL); L 27-30	2nd place, silver medalist(s)
Sarah Piccirillo	Women's -60 kg	Rodriguez Martinez (ESP); W 30-27	Kocakus (TUR); L 27-30	Did Not Advance	3rd place, bronze medalist(s)

== Padel ==
Athlete	Event	Round of 32	Round of 16	Quarterfinal	Semifinal	Final	Rank
Athlete	Event	Opposition Result	Opposition Result	Opposition Result	Opposition Result	Opposition Result	Rank
Jerome Peeters; Francois Azzola	Men's doubles	Nolten/Sietsma (NED); W 2-1	Maszczyk/Janowicz (POL); W 2-0	Cremona/Cassetta (ITA); L 0-2	Did Not Advance		5
Maxime Deloyer; Bram Coene	Men's doubles	Venos/Stepanek (CZE); W 2-0	Sinicropi/Graziotti (ITA); L 1-2	Did Not Advance			9
Helena Wyckaert; An-Sophie Mestach	Women's doubles	Clement/Scholten (GER); W 2-0	Lukasiak/Maciocha (POL); W 2-0	Pappacena/Sussarello (ITA); L 1-2	Did Not Advance		5
Dorien Cuypers; Elyne Boeykens	Women's doubles	Weterings/Koek (NED); L 1-2	Did Not Advance				17
Helena Wyckaert; Bram Coene	Mixed doubles	—	Pothier/Leygue (FRA); L 0-2	Did Not Advance			9
Francois Azzola; Dorien Cuypers	Mixed doubles	—	Cassetta/Sussarello (ITA); L 1-2	Did Not Advance			9

== Rugby sevens ==
Athletes	Event	Group stage				Quarterfinal	Placing 5-8		Semi-final	Final/BM	Rank
Athletes	Event	Opponent Score	Opponent Score	Opponent Score	Rank	Opponent Score	Opponent Score	Opponent Score	Opponent Score	Opponent Score	Rank
Gaspard Lalli; Gillian Benoy; Hugues Bastin; Isaac Montoisy; Jens Torfs; Julien Berger; Matias Remue / Nathan Bontems; Timothé Rifon; Timothée Devos; Tornike Megrelidze; Victor André; William Van Bost	Men's tournament	Spain; L 12-26	Georgia; L 7-14	Czech Republic; W 40-7	3 Q	Ireland; L 12-26	Georgia; W 21-5	Germany; W 24-0	—		5
Cécile Blondiau; Ella Amory; Emilie Musch; Hanne Swiers; Héloïse Stévins; Laura Bosman; Loes Hubrecht / Margaux Lalli; Nele Pien; Noémie van de Poele; Pauline Gernaey; Shari Claes	Women's tournament	Sweden; W 40-0	Romania; W 39-0	Spain; L 7-29	2 Q	Portugal; W 22-5	—		Great Britain; L 12-36	Czech Republic; L 17-24	4

== Sports Climbing ==
Athlete	Event	Qualification		Elimination	Quarterfinal	Semifinal	Final	
Athlete	Event	Time	Seed	Opponent Result	Opponent Result	Opponent Result	Opponent Result	Rank
Lucie Delcoigne	Women's lead	—				15	Did Not Advance	
Lucie Delcoigne	Women's boulder	—				11	Did Not Advance	

== Shooting ==
Athlete	Event	Qualification				Final/BM	
Athlete	Event	Score	Rank	Score	Rank	Score	Rank
Jessie Kaps	Women's 50m rifle 3 positions	574	35	—		Did Not Advance	
Jessie Kaps	Women's 10m air rifle	619.3	35	—		Did Not Advance	

== Table Tennis ==
Athlete	Event	Preliminary Round 1	Preliminary Round 2	Round of 32	Round of 16	Quarterfinal	Semifinal	Final	
Athlete	Event	Opponent Result	Opponent Result	Opponent Result	Opponent Result	Opponent Result	Opponent Result	Opponent Result	Rank
Cedric Nuytinck	Men's singles	Bye	Glod (LUX); W 4-0	Geraldo (POR); W 4-3	Gacina (CRO); L 1-4	Did Not Advance			9
Adrien Rassenfosse	Men's singles	Bye	Szudi (HUN); W 4-3	Karlsson (SWE); L 0-4	Did Not Advance				17
Nathalie Marchetti	Women's singles	Bye	Arapovic (CRO); L 3-4	Did Not Advance					33
Margot Degraef	Women's singles	Bye	Madarasz (HUN); L 0-4	Did Not Advance					33
Martin Allegro; Adrien Rassenfosse; Cedric Nuytinck	Men's team	—			Poland; W 3-1	Germany; L 0-3	Did Not Advance		5

== Taekwondo ==
Athlete	Event	Round of 16	Quarterfinals	Semifinals	Repechage	Final / BM	
Athlete	Event	Opposition Result	Opposition Result	Opposition Result	Opposition Result	Opposition Result	Rank
Badr Achab	Men's 74 kg	Kovacic (SLO); W 1-2	Husić (BIH); L 2-0	—	Binev (BUL); L 2-0	—	=7
Raheleh Asemani	Women's 57 kg	Marton (HUN); L 2-1	Did not advance				
Sarah Chaâri	Women's 62 kg	Andersson (SWE); W 2-0	Tarvida (LAT); W 2-0	Powell (GBR); W 2-0	—	Štolbová (CZE); W 2-1	1st place, gold medalist(s)

== Triathlon ==
Men

Athlete	Event	Swim (1.5 km)	Trans 1	Bike (40 km)	Trans 2	Run (10 km)	Total Time	Rank
Arnaud Mengal	Men's Triathlon	19:27	0:55	55:47	0:26	32:04	1:48:37	20
Noah Servais	Men's Triathlon	18:28	0:52	56:42	0:27	31:23	1:47:50	16

Women

Athlete	Event	Swim (1.5 km)	Trans 1	Bike (40 km)	Trans 2	Run (10 km)	Total Time	Rank
Jolien Vermeylen	Women's Triathlon	19:35	0:57	1:01:43	0:26	34:38	1:57:17	3rd place, bronze medalist(s)
