= Taekwondo at the 2023 European Games – Women's 57 kg =

Taekwondo competition

Women's 57 kg at the 2023 European Games
- Venue: Krynica-Zdrój Arena
- Date: 24 June
- Competitors: 15 from 15 nations

Medalists
gold medal	Jade Jones	Great Britain
silver medal	Luana Márton	Hungary
bronze medal	Kristina Tomić	Croatia
bronze medal	Hatice Kübra İlgün	Turkey

The women's 57 kg competition in taekwondo at the 2023 European Games took place on 24 June at the Krynica-Zdrój Arena.

== Schedule ==
All times are Central European Summer Time (UTC+2).

Date	Time	Event
Saturday, 24 June 2023	09:24	Round of 16
Saturday, 24 June 2023	14:00	Quarterfinals
Saturday, 24 June 2023	16:00	Semifinals
Saturday, 24 June 2023	16:24	Repechage
Saturday, 24 June 2023	19:00	Bronze medal bouts
Saturday, 24 June 2023	20:24	Final

== Results ==
Round of 16
Klaudija Tvaronavičiūtė (LTU)	0	6	8
Melanie Kindl (AUT)	4	2	4
Faidra Kalteki (GRE)	3	12
Ruqia Rahmani (FIN)	1	0
Luana Márton (HUN)	4	4	10
Raheleh Asemani (BEL)	4	7	3
Patrycja Adamkiewicz (POL)	4	13
Joana Cunha (POR)	3	1
Kristina Tomić (CRO)	4	7
Bodine Schoenmakers (NED)	3	5
Giada Al Halwani (ITA)	5	0	6
Arlet Ortiz (ESP)	5	11	7
Ingibjörg Grétarsdóttir (ISL)	0	0
Jade Jones (GBR)	14	8

Quarterfinals
Hatice Kübra İlgün (TUR)	7	9
Klaudija Tvaronavičiūtė (LTU)	2	6
Faidra Kalteki (GRE)	0	2
Luana Márton (HUN)	10	6
Patrycja Adamkiewicz (POL)	8	10
Kristina Tomić (CRO)	11	11
Arlet Ortiz (ESP)	2	8
Jade Jones (GBR)	14	15^{P}

Semifinals
Hatice Kübra İlgün (TUR)	13	8	8
Luana Márton (HUN)	5	14	21
Kristina Tomić (CRO)
Jade Jones (GBR)	W	O

Final
Luana Márton (HUN)	6	6
Jade Jones (GBR)	13	9

=== Repechage ===
Repechage
Faidra Kalteki (GRE)	5	11	8
Raheleh Asemani (BEL)	2	11	3
Ingibjörg Grétarsdóttir (ISL)	11	2	3
Arlet Ortiz (ESP)	5	8	5

Bronze medal bout
Kristina Tomić (CRO)	10	12
Faidra Kalteki (GRE)	6	6
Arlet Ortiz (ESP)	8	11
Hatice Kübra İlgün (TUR)	23	15
