= Archery at the 2023 European Games – Women's individual compound =

Women's individual compound at the 2023 European Games
- Venue: Plaszowianka Archery Park
- Date: 23–28 June
- Competitors: 15 from 15 nations

Medalists
gold medal	Elisa Roner	Italy
silver medal	Ella Gibson	Great Britain
bronze medal	Hazal Burun	Turkey

The women's individual compound competition at the 2023 European Games was held from 23 to 28 June 2023 at the Plaszowianka Archery Park in Kraków, Poland.

== Records ==
Prior to the competition, the existing world, European and Games records were as follows:

- 72 arrow ranking round

World record	Sara López (COL)	713	Medellín, Colombia	29 August 2015
European record	Ella Gibson (GBR)	712	Paris, France	21 June 2022
Games record	Toja Ellison (SLO)	702	Minsk, Belarus	21 June 2019

- 15 arrow match

World record	Sara López (COL)	150/12	Medellín, Colombia	23 July 2022
European record	Ella Gibson (GBR)	150/10	Coventry, Great Britain	2 June 2022
Games record	Sophie Dodemont (FRA)	148	Minsk, Belarus	26 June 2019

== Results ==
=== Ranking round ===
Rank	Archer	Nation	Score	10s	Xs
1	Ella Gibson	Great Britain	715 WR	67	32
2	Tanja Gellenthien	Denmark	712	64	38
3	Lisell Jäätma	Estonia	708	61	31
4	Sarah Prieels	Belgium	707	59	28
5	Hazal Burun	Turkey	705	57	26
6	Elisa Roner	Italy	703	56	26
7	Andrea Muñoz	Spain	702	56	24
8	Sophie Dodemont	France	699	51	20
9	Sanne de Laat	Netherlands	696	48	19
10	Katharina Raab	Germany	693	48	20
11	Mariya Shkolna	Luxembourg	690	43	16
12	Olha Khomutovska	Ukraine	684	41	17
13	Satu Nisula	Finland	680	36	12
14	Małgorzata Kapusta	Poland	679	36	12
15	Jūlija Oleksejenko	Latvia	647	23	5

=== Elimination round ===
Round of 16
9	De Laat (NED)	145
8	Dodemont (FRA)	143
5	Burun (TUR)	147
12	Khomutovska (UKR)	143
13	Nisula (FIN)	143
4	Prieels (BEL)	142
3	Jäätma (EST)	150 GR
14	Kapusta (POL)	143
11	Shkolna (LUX)	138
6	Roner (ITA)	148
7	Muñoz (ESP)	145
10	Raab (GER)	143
15	Oleksejenko (LAT)	133
2	Gellenthien (DEN)	149

Quarterfinals
1	Gibson (GBR)	143
9	De Laat (NED)	142
5	Burun (TUR)	143
13	Nisula (FIN)	136
3	Jäätma (EST)	142
6	Roner (ITA)	144
7	Muñoz (ESP)	141
2	Gellenthien (DEN)	146

Semifinals
1	Gibson (GBR)	148
5	Burun (TUR)	144
6	Roner (ITA)	141^{10}
2	Gellenthien (DEN)	141^{9}

Gold medal match
1	Gibson (GBR)	139
6	Roner (ITA)	145
Bronze medal match
5	Burun (TUR)	146
2	Gellenthien (DEN)	138
