= Boxing at the 2023 European Games – Women's welterweight =

Women's welterweight boxing at the 2023 European Games
- Venue: Nowy Targ Arena
- Location: Nowy Targ, Poland
- Dates: 24 June – 1 July
- Competitors: 19 from 19 nations

Medalists
gold medal	Busenaz Sürmeneli	Turkey
silver medal	Oshin Derieuw	Belgium
bronze medal	Rosie Eccles	Great Britain
bronze medal	Luca Anna Hámori	Hungary

The women's welterweight boxing event at the 2023 European Games was held between 24 June and 1 July 2023.

== Results ==
=== Finals ===
Semi-finals
Luca Anna Hámori (HUN)	0
Oshin Derieuw (BEL)	5
Rosie Eccles (GBR)	1
Busenaz Sürmeneli (TUR)	4

Final
Oshin Derieuw (BEL)	0
Busenaz Sürmeneli (TUR)	5

=== Top half ===
==== Section 1 ====
Round of 32
Luca Anna Hámori (HUN)	5
Markéta Tojnarová (CZE)	0

Round of 16
Madeleine Angelsen (NOR)	0
Luca Anna Hámori (HUN)	5
Luna Beeloo (NED)	4
Mariia Bova (UKR)	1

Quarterfinals
Luca Anna Hámori (HUN)	5
Luna Beeloo (NED)	0

==== Section 2 ====
Round of 32

Round of 16
Emilie Sonvico (FRA)	RSC
Sona Harutyunyan (ARM)
Oshin Derieuw (BEL)	5
Shahla Allahverdiyeva (AZE)	0

Quarterfinals
Emilie Sonvico (FRA)	2
Oshin Derieuw (BEL)	3

=== Bottom half ===
==== Section 3 ====
Round of 32
Amy Broadhurst (IRL)	5
Milena Matović (SRB)	0

Round of 16
Beatrise Rozentāle (LAT)	0
Amy Broadhurst (IRL)	5
Rosie Eccles (GBR)	4
Assunta Canfora (ITA)	1

Quarterfinals
Amy Broadhurst (IRL)	2
Rosie Eccles (GBR)	3

==== Section 4 ====
Round of 32
Busenaz Sürmeneli (TUR)	5
Austėja Aučiūtė (LTU)	0

Round of 16
Stefanie von Berge (GER)	1
Aneta Rygielska (POL)	4
Busenaz Sürmeneli (TUR)	RSC
Paraskevi Mavrommati (GRE)

Quarterfinals
Aneta Rygielska (POL)	0
Busenaz Sürmeneli (TUR)	5
