= Muaythai at the 2025 World Games – Women's 54 kg =

World Games muaythai event

Women's 54 kg at the 2025 World Games
- Muaythai pictogram
- Venue: Sichuan Provincial Gymnasium
- Dates: 8–10 August 2025
- Competitors: 8 from 8 nations

Medalists
1st place, gold medalist(s)		Laura Burgos	Mexico
2nd place, silver medalist(s)		Martyna Kierczyńska	Poland
3rd place, bronze medalist(s)		Monika Chochlíková	Slovakia

The women's 54 kg muaythai (Note: Muaythai is the official name of Muay Thai, recognized by International World Games Association and International Olympic Committee.) event at the 2025 World Games will be held from 8 to 10 August 2025 at the Sichuan Provincial Gymnasium. 8 Muay Thai practitioners from 8 nations participated in the event.

== Competition schedule ==
All times are in local time (UTC+8), according to the official schedule.

Date	Time	Event
8 August 2025	15:00	Quarterfinals
9 August 2025	19:00	Semifinals
10 August 2025	18:30	Bronze medal match
10 August 2025	20:00	Gold medal match

== Results ==
=== Legend ===
- RET — Won by Retirement
- RSC-H — Won by Referee Stopping Contest - Hard Head Blows
- WO — Won by Walkover

=== Bracket ===
Quarterfinals
Laura Burgos (MEX)	30
Axana Depypere (BEL)	27
Monika Chochlíková (SVK)	29
Megan Washam (USA)	28
Kuang Fey (CHN)	27
Anna Székely (HUN)	30
Anna Safeeva (AIN)	27
Martyna Kierczyńska (POL)	30

Semifinals
Laura Burgos (MEX)	30
Monika Chochlíková (SVK)	27
Anna Székely (HUN)	27
Martyna Kierczyńska (POL)	30

Gold medal bout
Laura Burgos (MEX)	29
Martyna Kierczyńska (POL)	28
Bronze medal bout
Monika Chochlíková (SVK)	29
Anna Székely (HUN)	28
