= Viktorie Bulínová =

Czech Muay Thai kickboxer

- Born: 21 April 1998 (age 28); Brno, Czech Republic
- Height: 1.65 m (5 ft 5 in)
- Weight: 55 kg (121 lb; 8 st 9 lb)
- Style: Kickboxing, Muay Thai
- Stance: Orthodox
- Fighting out of: Czech Republic
- Team: Valetudo RK Znojmo

Kickboxing record
- Total: 14
- Wins: 9
- Losses: 5

Viktorie Bulínová (born 21 April 1998) is a Czech professional muay thai kickboxer. Since November 2023, she is the current ISKA Women's World Bantamweight Muay Thai champion.

== Kickboxing and Muay Thai career ==
Bulínová competed in the 2019 IFMA World Muaythai Championships. She won a bronze medal after she lost to Almira Tinchurina in the semifinals.

Bulínová competed in the 2022 World Games in the 54 kg category, where she was eliminated by Ashley Thiner in the quarterfinal.

Bulínová competed in the 2023 European Games in the 54 kg category, where she was eliminated by Martyna Kierczyńska in the quarterfinal.

Bulínová faced Atenea Flores for the vacant ISKA Women's World Bantamweight Muay Thai Championship on 25 November 2023. She won the bout by unanimous decision to win the title.

== Championships and accomplishments ==
Professional

- Professional Muaythai League
  - 2022 PML Women's Flyweight (-55.3 kg) Championship
- International Sport Kickboxing Association
  - 2023 ISKA Women's World Bantamweight (-55 kg) Muay Thai Championship

== Fight record ==
Kickboxing record
9 Wins, 5 Losses, 0 Draws
Date	Result	Opponent	Event	Location	Method	Round	Time
2023-11-25	Win	(Spain) Atenea Flores	Clash Of Gladiators 3	Grevenbroich, Germany	Decision (Unanimous)	5	3:00
Wins ISKA Women's World Bantamweight (-55kg) Muay Thai Championship.
2022-11-19	Win	(Slovakia) Olga Kvaiserová	PML 5: City of Dragon	Třinec, Czech Republic	Decision (Unanimous)	5	3:00
Wins the PML Women's Flyweight (-55.3 kg) Championship.
2022-06-11	Win	(Slovakia) Adriana Vrbová	PML 3: The First Champion	Brno, Czech Republic	Decision (Unanimous)	3	3:00
2021-11-26	Win	(Germany) Lucille Kappi	4. Hückelhovener Fight Night	Hückelhoven, Germany	KO (Knees)	2	
2021-09-24	Loss	(Turkey) Gülistan Turan	Fight4KO Night	Antalya, Turkey	Decision (Unanimous)	3	3:00
2021-02-27	Loss	(Czech Republic) Klára Strnadová	Oktagon Underground	Prague, Czech Republic	Decision (Majority)	3	3:00
2020-08-08	Win	(Slovakia) Sylvia Veselovská	Titan Fight Night: TFN Talents	Slovakia	Decision (Unanimous)	3	3:00
2020-06-20	Loss	(Slovakia) Monika Chochlíková	Oktagon Underground Superfight / MT Rules	Bratislava, Slovakia	Decision	3	3:00
Legend: Win Loss Draw/No contest Notes
