= Laura Burgos =

Mexican Muay Thai fighter (born 1989)

- Born: December 30, 1989 (age 36); Nuevo León, Mexico
- Style: Muay Thai

Laura Fernanda Burgos López (born December 30, 1989) is a Mexican Muay Thai fighter. She is a two-time IFMA World Champion and a two-time medalist at the World Games.

== Muay Thai career ==
At the 2022 World Games, Burgos competed in the ‍–‍54 kg category. She reached the semifinals, losing to Sveva Melillo. She won the bronze medal match by defeating Yolanda Schmidt. In March 2023, however, it was announced that Melillo had tested positive for canrenone. As a result, she was stripped of the gold medal and the silver medal was reassigned to Burgos instead.

At the 2023 World Combat Games, held in Riyadh, Saudi Arabia, Burgos reached the gold medal match, where she lost to Martyna Kierczyńska, earning her a silver medal. In 2024, she won the IFMA World Championship for the first time, in the 54 kg division, in Patras, Greece.

In May 2025, Burgos won the IFMA World Championship once again, in the same division, in Antalya, Turkey. Three months later, at the 2025 World Games, she competed in the ‍–‍54 kg category once again. She defeated Axana Depypere in the querterfinals and Monika Chochlíková in the semifinals. Heading to the gold medal match, She faced Martyna Kierczyńska, winning the bout and the medal.

== Personal life ==
Burgos is married to Ernesto Quiroga who also serves as her head coach.
