= Karate at the 2023 European Games =

Karate competition

- Venue: Bielsko-Biała Arena
- Location: Bielsko-Biała, Poland
- Dates: 22–23 June
- Competitors: 96 from 33 nations

Karate competitions at the 2023 European Games was held on 22 and 23 June 2023 at the Bielsko-Biała Arena.

== Medal table ==
* Host nation (Poland)

Rank	Nation	Gold	Silver	Bronze	Total
1	Ukraine	2	1	1	4
2	Azerbaijan	2	0	1	3
2	Spain	2	0	1	3
4	Germany	2	0	0	2
5	Turkey	1	1	4	6
6	Albania	1	0	0	1
6	Austria	1	0	0	1
6	Croatia	1	0	0	1
9	Italy	0	3	4	7
10	Greece	0	2	2	4
11	France	0	1	1	2
11	Switzerland	0	1	1	2
13	Bulgaria	0	1	0	1
13	Netherlands	0	1	0	1
15	Poland*	0	0	2	2
16	Armenia	0	0	1	1
16	Belgium	0	0	1	1
16	Cyprus	0	0	1	1
16	Georgia	0	0	1	1
16	Luxembourg	0	0	1	1
16	Portugal	0	0	1	1
16	Romania	0	0	1	1
Totals (22 entries)		12	11	24	47

== Medalists ==
=== Men ===
Event	Gold	Silver	Bronze
Individual kata	Damián Quintero; Spain	Ali Sofuoğlu; Turkey	Yuki Ujihara; Switzerland
Individual kata	Damián Quintero; Spain	Ali Sofuoğlu; Turkey	Mattia Busato; Italy
Kumite −60 kg	Eray Şamdan; Turkey	Christos-Stefanos Xenos; Greece	Angelo Crescenzo; Italy
Kumite −60 kg	Eray Şamdan; Turkey	Christos-Stefanos Xenos; Greece	Nikita Filipov; Ukraine
Kumite −67 kg	Tural Aghalarzade; Azerbaijan	Dionysios Xenos; Greece	Ştefan Comănescu; Romania
Kumite −67 kg	Tural Aghalarzade; Azerbaijan	Dionysios Xenos; Greece	Miłosz Sabiecki; Poland
Kumite −75 kg	Andrii Zaplitnyi; Ukraine	Daniele De Vivo; Italy	Erman Eltemur; Turkey
Kumite −75 kg	Andrii Zaplitnyi; Ukraine	Daniele De Vivo; Italy	Quentin Mahauden; Belgium
Kumite −84 kg	Alvin Karaqi; Albania	Brian Timmermans; Netherlands	Michał Bąbos; Poland
Kumite −84 kg	Alvin Karaqi; Albania	Brian Timmermans; Netherlands	Michele Martina; Italy
Kumite +84 kg	Anđelo Kvesić; Croatia	Not awarded	Asiman Gurbanli; Azerbaijan
Kumite +84 kg	Anđelo Kvesić; Croatia	Not awarded	Gogita Arkania; Georgia

=== Women ===
Event	Gold	Silver	Bronze
Individual kata	Paola García; Spain	Helvétia Taily; France	Georgina Xenou; Greece
Individual kata	Paola García; Spain	Helvétia Taily; France	Ana Cruz; Portugal
Kumite −50 kg	Bettina Plank; Austria	Erminia Perfetto; Italy	Irene Kontou; Cyprus
Kumite −50 kg	Bettina Plank; Austria	Erminia Perfetto; Italy	Serap Özçelik Arapoğlu; Turkey
Kumite −55 kg	Anzhelika Terliuga; Ukraine	Ivet Goranova; Bulgaria	Jennifer Warling; Luxembourg
Kumite −55 kg	Anzhelika Terliuga; Ukraine	Ivet Goranova; Bulgaria	Tuba Yakan; Turkey
Kumite −61 kg	Reem Khamis; Germany	Anita Serogina; Ukraine	Alessandra Mangiacapra; Italy
Kumite −61 kg	Reem Khamis; Germany	Anita Serogina; Ukraine	Gülbahar Gözütok; Turkey
Kumite −68 kg	Irina Zaretska; Azerbaijan	Elena Quirici; Switzerland	Anita Makyan; Armenia
Kumite −68 kg	Irina Zaretska; Azerbaijan	Elena Quirici; Switzerland	Alizée Agier; France
Kumite +68 kg	Johanna Kneer; Germany	Clio Ferracuti; Italy	Kyriaki Kydonaki; Greece
Kumite +68 kg	Johanna Kneer; Germany	Clio Ferracuti; Italy	María Torres; Spain

== Qualification ==
NOC	Men						Women						Total
NOC	Kata	-60 kg	-67 kg	-75 kg	-84 kg	+84 kg	Kata	-50 kg	-55 kg	-61 kg	-68 kg	+68 kg	Total
Albania					X								1
Armenia											X		1
Austria								X					1
Azerbaijan		X	X	X		X		X	X		X	X	8
Belgium				X									1
Bosnia and Herzegovina						X							1
Bulgaria									X				1
Croatia					X	X						X	3
Cyprus								X					1
Czech Republic							X						1
Denmark							X						1
Finland												X	1
France	X						X				X		3
Georgia					X	X							2
Germany		X						X	X	X		X	5
Great Britain				X									1
Greece		X	X		X	X	X					X	6
Hungary	X		X										2
Israel		X											1
Italy	X	X		X	X			X	X	X	X	X	9
Luxembourg									X				1
Montenegro	X												1
Netherlands					X					X			2
North Macedonia			X										1
Poland	X	X	X	X	X	X	X	X	X	X	X	X	12
Portugal				X			X						2
Romania			X										1
Slovakia										X			1
Spain	X					X	X				X	X	5
Sweden										X			1
Switzerland	X		X								X		3
Turkey	X	X	X	X		X	X	X	X	X			9
Ukraine		X		X	X			X	X	X	X		7
Total: 33 NOCs	8	8	8	8	8	8	8	8	8	8	8	8	96
