= Martyna Kierczyńska =

Polish Muay Thai fighter (born 2002)

- Born: April 9, 2002 (age 24); Głogów, Poland
- Nationality: Polish
- Style: Muay Thai

Kickboxing record
- Total: 8
- Wins: 7
- Losses: 1

Martyna Kierczyńska (born April 9, 2002) is a Polish Muay Thai fighter. She currently competes in ONE Championship. She is a gold medalist at the European Games, World Combat Games and a silver medalist at the World Games.

== Muay Thai career ==
=== European and World Combat Games ===
Kierczyńska competed in the 2023 European Games in the 54 kg category. After defeating Viktorie Bulínová in the quarterfinal and Elene Loladze in the semifinal, she defeated Axana Depypere to win the gold medal. At the 2023 World Combat Games, held in Riyadh, Saudi Arabia, Kierczyńska reached the gold medal match, where she defeated Laura Burgos, earning her a gold medal.

=== ONE Championship ===
Kierczyńska signed with ONE Championship and made her promotional debut against Wondergirl Jaroonsak at ONE Fight Night 19 on February 17, 2024. She won the fight via second-round TKO.

Kierczyńska faced Ekaterina Vandaryeva on March 9, 2024, at ONE Fight Night 20. She lost the fight via unanimous decision.

Kierczyńska faced Yu Yau Pui on March 8, 2025, at ONE Fight Night 29. She won the bout by split decision.

Kierczyńska faced Cynthia Flores at ONE Fight Night 33 on July 12, 2025. She won the bout by unanimous decision.

At the 2025 World Games, Kierczyńska competed in the ‍–‍54 kg category once again. She defeated Anna Safeeva in the querterfinals and Anna Székely in the semifinals. Heading to the gold medal match, She faced Burgos, losing the bout and thus earned her the silver medal.
