= Emine Arslan =

Turkish kickboxer (born 1989)

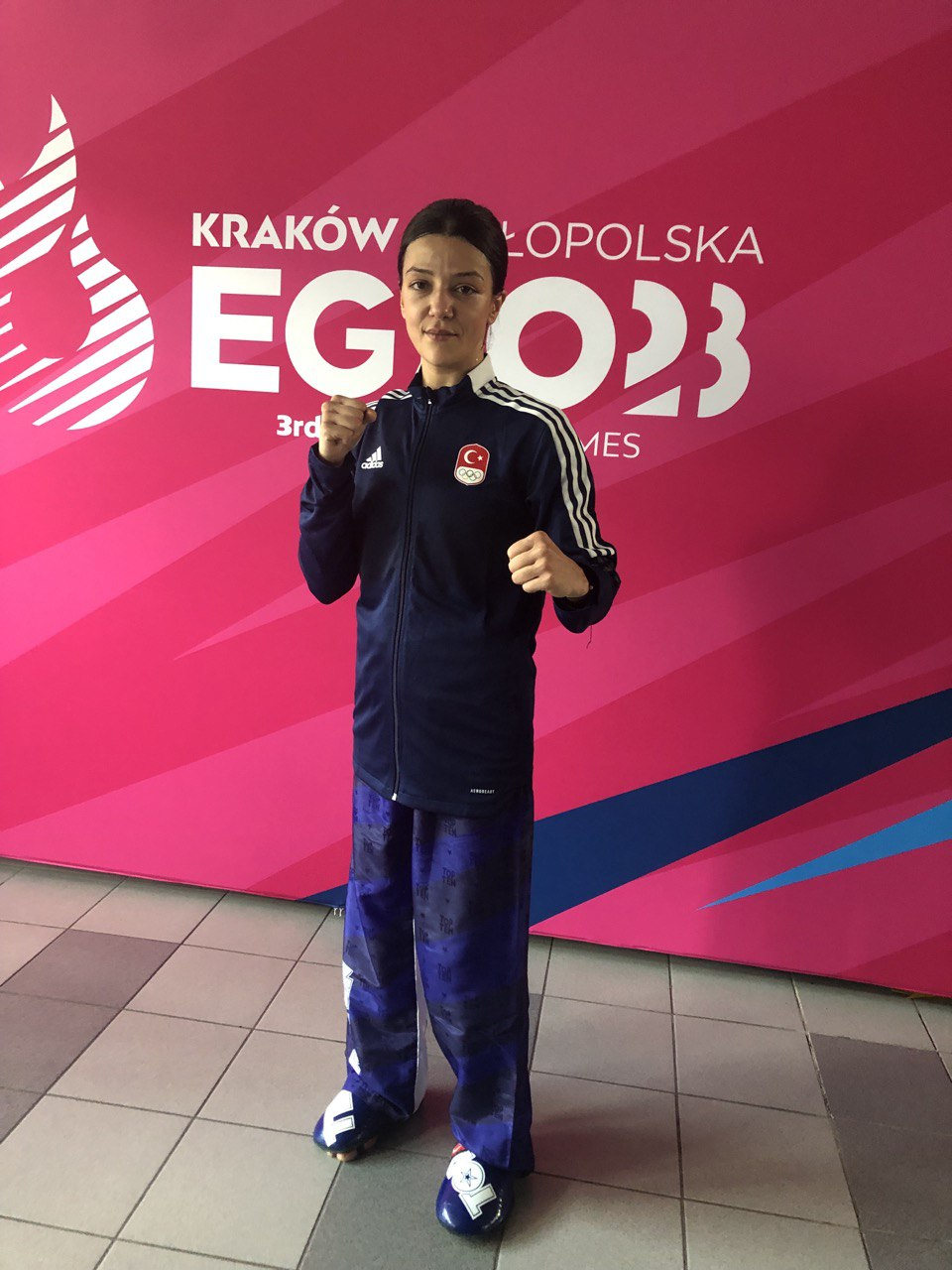
- Born: 4 January 1989 (age 37); Bağcılar, Istanbul, Turkey
- Height: 1.67 m (5 ft 5 1/2 in)
- Division: Full contact 52 kg
- Style: Kickboxing

Emine Arslan (born 4 January 1989) is a Turkish kickboxer competing in the full contact 52 kg division. She is a world, Islamic Solidarity Games and European Games kickboxing champion.

== Sport career ==
Arslan discovered kickboxing at the age of 23 as her younger sister started to attend a new gym, which opened in a local basement. The gym owner, Hasan Fahri Şen, was a former Turkish champion in martial arts and a coach. He offered to start training her for kickboxing. In the beginning, she was not interested because she had to work until late leaving little spare time and she was very tired after work. She also smoked two packs of cigarettes a day, and coughed up dust due to the conditions in her workplace. The coach and Deniz Işık Doğan persuaded her to begin training in the gym. She soon realized that kickboxing was very different from what she had thought. She exercised three days a week, and made great progress as a sportswoman in the first four months.

Arslan became the Turkish champion for three consecutive years. In 2015, she debuted internationally and she won a gold medal at the Intercontinental Kickboxing Mauritius Cup event. She won the silver medal at the 2016 European Championship in Maribor in Slovenia, and the gold medal at the 2019 World Seniors Kickboxing Championship in Antalya in Turkey. In 2021, she captured the gold medals at the World Kickboxing Seniors Championship in Jesolo, Italy and the 2021 Islamic Solidarity Games in Konya, Turkey. At the 2023 European Games in Myślenice, Poland, she was the champion.

== Personal life ==
Emine Arslan was born as a first child in the Bağcılar district of Istanbul, Turkey on 4 January 1989. Her brother was born a year later and her sister two years later. When she was ten years old, her mother left her father, and later divorced him. Emine lived for a year with her mother before she returned to her father due to her mother's indifference. At age twelve, she started working as a child worker in a garment workshop, where her father had an ironing job. She dropped out of school after her primary education. Since they had no place to stay, she and her two siblings spent the nights in the workshop's office, until her father was able to rent a house. Her father had to quit work after he was diagnosed with lung cancer and he died in 2007. At eighteen she was the head of her family group until she reconciled with her mother and they began living together again.

She was fired from her workplace when she asked for permission to attend a national preparation camp for kickboxing. She found work as a secretary at the district municipality's youth center, after she won the silver medal at the European Championship in 2016. She completed her secondary education using distance learning and she earned extra money by coaching groups of women in kickboxing. She played stunt roles in Valley of the Wolves, Kırgın Çiçekler and Kösem Sultan.
