= Muaythai at the 2023 European Games =

Muaythai tournament

- Venue: Myślenice Arena
- Location: Myślenice, Poland
- Dates: 25–28 June
- Competitors: 80 from 23 nations

The muaythai (Note: Muaythai is the official name of Muay Thai, recognized by the European Olympic Committees and the International Olympic Committee.) tournaments at the 2023 European Games in Myślenice, Małopolska, Poland were held from 25 to 28 June 2023 at the Myślenice Arena. Muaythai was one of ten new sports added to the European Games specifically for the 2023 edition.

== Competition format ==
Men will contest matches in these five weight classes:

- Light welterweight (60 kg)
- Welterweight (67 kg)
- Light middleweight (71 kg)
- Light heavyweight (81 kg)
- Heavyweight (91 kg)

Women will contest matches in these five weight classes:

- Flyweight (51 kg)
- Bantamweight (54 kg)
- Featherweight (57 kg)
- Lightweight (60 kg)
- Light welterweight (63.5 kg)

== Qualification ==
A total of 80 athletes could qualify for muaythai at the 2023 European Games. Each National Olympic Committee could enter a maximum of 6 muaythai practitioners (one in each division). Host nation Poland has reserved a spot in each of all 10 events, while 10 are made available to NOCs through the universality places.

The remaining muaythai practitioners underwent a qualifying process to earn a spot for the Games through the qualifying event and ranking list prepared by the International Federation of Muaythai Associations on March 20, 2023, and finalized on 2 June.

== Medal table ==
* Host nation (Poland)

Rank	Nation	Gold	Silver	Bronze	Total
1	Ukraine	3	1	2	6
2	Turkey	2	2	2	6
3	Poland*	1	2	2	5
4	Belgium	1	1	1	3
5	Sweden	1	0	1	2
6	Estonia	1	0	0	1
6	Moldova	1	0	0	1
8	Portugal	0	2	0	2
9	Czech Republic	0	1	2	3
10	Italy	0	1	0	1
11	Azerbaijan	0	0	3	3
12	Finland	0	0	2	2
12	France	0	0	2	2
14	Armenia	0	0	1	1
14	Georgia	0	0	1	1
14	Greece	0	0	1	1
Totals (16 entries)		10	10	20	40

== Medal summary ==
=== Men ===
Event	Gold	Silver	Bronze
60 kg	Gianny De Leu; Belgium	Sercan Koç; Turkey	Vladyslav Mykytas; Ukraine Narek Khachikyan; Armenia
67 kg	Igor Liubchenko; Ukraine	Oskar Siegert; Poland	Linus Bylander; Sweden Khayal Aliyev; Azerbaijan
71 kg	Oleksandr Yefimenko; Ukraine	Gonçalo Noite; Portugal	Messie Kubila; France Jakub Rajewski; Poland
81 kg	Artiom Livadari; Moldova	Yehor Skurikhin; Ukraine	Ondřej Malina; Czech Republic Enis Yunusoğlu; Turkey
91 kg	Oleh Pryimachov; Ukraine	Enrico Pellegrino Pellegri; Italy	Jakub Klauda; Czech Republic Kyriakos Bakirtzis; Greece

=== Women ===
Event	Gold	Silver	Bronze
51 kg	Gülistan Turan; Turkey	Roksana Dargiel; Poland	Anastasiia Mykhailenko; Ukraine Myriame Djedidi; France
54 kg	Martyna Kierczyńska; Poland	Axana Depypere; Belgium	Ezgi Keleş; Turkey Elene Loladze; Georgia
57 kg	Patricia Axling; Sweden	Matilde Melo; Portugal	Aysu Devrishova; Azerbaijan Miina Sirkeoja; Finland
60 kg	Astrid Johanna Grents; Estonia	Kübra Kocakuş; Turkey	Sarah Piccirillo; Belgium Dominika Filec; Poland
63.5 kg	Bediha Tacyıldız; Turkey	Tereza Štechová; Czech Republic	Emili Rzayeva; Azerbaijan Chonlathorn Mingsupphakun; Finland
