= Kübra Kocakuş =

Turkish martial artist (born 1996)

- Born: 24 July 1996 (age 29); Afyonkarahisar, Turkey
- Nationality: Turkish
- Division: 60 kg
- Style: Kickboxing, Muay Thai

Kübra Kocakuş
Medal record

Representing Turkey

Women's Muay Thai

World Games
Silver medal – second place	2025 Chengdu	60 kg

World Championship
Gold medal – first place	2024 Patras	60 kg
Gold medal – first place	2022 Abu Dhabi	60 kg

European Games
Silver medal – second place	2023 Myślenice	60 kg

European Championship
Bronze medal – third place	2024 Pristina	60 kg

Women's Kickboxing

World Championship
Bronze medal – third place	2021 Jesolo	60 kg

Islamic Solidarity Games
Gold medal – first place	2021 Konya	Low kick 60 kg

Kübra Kocakuş (born 24 July 1996) is a Turkish martial artist competing in kickboxing and Muay Thai of the 60 kg division. She is twice world champion in Muaythai.

== Sport career ==
Kocakuş started performing martial arts in 2015, and placed second at the Turkish championship the same year. In 2020, she became champion in the low kick 60 kg category at the Turkish Kickboxing Open in Antalya, and in the Elite 60 kg category at the Turkish Muaythai Championship in Nevşehir. She was admitted to the national team in 2021.

=== Kickboxing ===
She took the bronze medal at the 2021 World Kickboxing Seniors Championship held in Jesolo, Italy. She became gold medalist in the low kick 60 kg category at the 2021 Islamic Solidarity Games in Konya, Turkey.

=== Muaythai ===
In 2022, she captured the gold medal at the World Muaythai Seniors Championship in Abu Dhabi, United Arab Emirates. She won the silver medal in the 60 kg division at the 2023 European Games in Myślenice, Poland.

She captured the gold medal in the Elite Senior 60 kg event at the 2024 IFMA World Muaythai Championships in Patras, Greece. At the 2024 European Championships in Pristina, Kosovo, she took the bronze medal in the 60 kg division.

== Personal life ==
Born on 24 July 1996, Kübra Kocakuş is a native of Afyonkarahisar, Turkey. She was educated in Preschool teaching at Afyon Kocatepe University.
