= Ezgi Keleş =

Turkish martial artist (born 2002)

- Born: 28 February 2002 (age 23); Kayseri, Turkey
- Nationality: Turkish
- Division: 54 kg
- Style: Muay Thai

Ezgi Keleş
Medal record

Representing Turkey

Women's Muay Thai

IFMA World Championships
Bronze medal – third place	2024 Patras	57 kg
Silver medal – second place	2022 Abu Dhabi	54 kg

European Games
Bronze medal – third place	2023 Myślenice	54 kg

European Championship
Gold medal – first place	2024 Pristina	57 kg

Ezgi Keleş (born 28 February 2002) is a Turkish Muay Thai practitioner of the 54 kg division. She is a European champion.

== Sport career ==
Keleş won the silver medal in the U23 Elite 54 kg of the 2021 IFMA World Muaythai Championships in Phuket, Thailand, and the gold medal in the U23 category at the 2022 European Muaythai Championships in Istanbul, Turkey. At the 2022 FISU World Cup Combat Sports held in Samsun, Turkey, she became champion.

At the 2022 IFMA World Muaythai Championships held in Abu Dhabi, United Arab Emirates, Keleş received the silver medal in the Elite Senior 54 kg event. She took the bronze medal at the 2023 European Games in Myślenice, Poland.

At the 2024 European Championships in Pristina, Kosovo, she won the gold medal in the 57 kg division.

She took the bronze medal in the Elite Senior 57 kg event at the 2024 IFMA World Muaythai Championships in Patras, Greece.

== Personal life ==
Born on 28 February 2002, Ezgi Keleş is a native of Kayseri, Turkey. She is a student of Sport Science at Erciyes University in her hometown.
