= Gianny De Leu =

Belgian muay thai fighter

- Born: March 16, 2002 (age 24); Gent, Belgium
- Other names: The Lion of Flanders; Gianni De Leeuw
- Height: 1.69 m (5 ft 6 1/2 in)
- Weight: 54 kg (119 lb; 8.5 st)
- Division: Bantamweight; Super Bantamweight; Featherweight
- Style: Muay Thai
- Stance: Orthodox
- Fighting out of: Gent, Belgium
- Team: Sandu Gym / Topsport Belgian Defence (Belgium); Sor Dechapan (Thailand)
- Trainer: Sandu Viziru

Kickboxing record
- Total: 32
- Wins: 30
- Losses: 1
- Draws: 1

Other information
- Boxing record from BoxRec

Gianny De Leu (born March 16, 2002) is a Belgian Muay Thai fighter and kickboxer. He is the reigning WBC Muay Thai World Bantamweight champion and a former WMC and ISKA Muay Thai world champion. As an amateur he is a three time IFMA world championship gold medalist.

As of October 2026, De Leu was ranked as the second best Bantamweight muay thai fighter in the world according to Combat Press.

== Career ==
On October 1, 2022, De Leu faced Giuseppe Gesuito for the vacant WMC European 122lbs title. He won the fight by unanimous decision.

On October 14, 2023, De Leu faced Praipayak Sor.Sommai at Gent Thainight. He won the fight by first-round knockout.

On May 25, 2024, De Leu faced Samuel Olias at the Superfight Ninove event for the vacant ISKA Muay Thai World World Flyweight title. He won the fight by unanimous decision.

On September 6, 2024, De Leu made his professional kickboxing rules debut at ONE Friday Fights 78 in the Lumpinee Stadium against Naoya Kuroda. He won the fight by third-round knockout.

De Leu suffered his first professional defeat on September 19, 2025, at ONE Friday Fights 125 when Anon Taladkondernmuangpon stopped him in the second round by knockout with a body punch.

On October 11, 2025, De Leu faced David Garcia at the Gent Thainight event for the -54kg title. He won the fight by second-round knockout.

On April 25, 2026, De Leu faced Fergus Smith for the vacant WBC Muay Thai World Bantamweight title. He won the fight by unanimous decision.

== Championships and accomplishments ==
=== Professional ===
- World Boxing Council
  - 2026 WBC Muay Thai World Bantamweight (118 lbs) Champion
- World Muaythai Council
  - 2022 WMC European Super Bantamweight (122 lbs) Champion
  - 2023 WMC World Super Bantamweight (122 lbs) Champion
  - 2024 WMC International -54kg Champion
- International Sport Kickboxing Association
  - 2024 ISKA Muay Thai World World Flyweight (-53.5kg) Champion

=== Amateur ===
- International Federation of Muaythai Associations
  - 2019 IFMA Youth World Championships Junior (16-17) -54 kg (gold)
  - 2021 IFMA World Championships U23 -54 kg (gold)
  - 2022 IFMA World Championships -54 kg (gold)
  - 2025 IFMA World Championships -54 kg (gold)
  - 2026 IFMA World Championships -54 kg (gold)
  - 2026 IFMA European Championships -57 kg (gold)
- European Games
  - 2023 European Games Muay Thai -60 kg (gold)

== Fight record ==
Professional Muay Thai & Kickboxing record
31 Wins ( (T)KO's), 1 Loss, 1 Draw
Date	Result	Opponent	Event	Location	Method	Round	Time
2026-07-18	Win	(Thailand) Wanmeechok TKD.MuayThaiGym	Rajadamnern World Series, Rajadamnern Stadium	Bangkok, Thailand	KO (front kick)	1	2:15
2026-04-25	Win	(United Kingdom) Fergus Smith	Sandu Show	Ninove, Belgium	Decision (unanimous)	5	3:00
Won the vacant WBC Muay Thai World Bantamweight (118 lbs) title.
2025-12-06	Win	(Spain) Nacho Egaña	Fights at the Border 25	Lommel, Belgium	Decision (unanimous)	3	3:00
2025-10-11	Win	(Spain) David Garcia	Gent Thainight	Gent, Belgium	KO	2	
Won the vacant Gent Thainight -54kg title.
2025-09-19	Loss	(Thailand) Anon Taladkondernmuangpon	ONE Friday Fights 125, Lumpinee Stadium	Bangkok, Thailand	KO (punch to the body)	2	1:50
2025-07-21	Win	(Thailand)	Rajadamnern Knockout, Rajadamnern Stadium	Bangkok, Thailand	KO (elbow)		
2024-10-06	Win	(Hong Kong) Leung Pak Yu	Gent Thainight	Gent, Belgium	KO (knee to the body)	3	
Won the vacant WMC International -54kg title.
2024-09-06	Win	(Japan) Naoya Kuroda	ONE Friday Fights 78, Lumpinee Stadium	Bangkok, Thailand	KO (punches)	3	0:27
2024-05-25	Win	(Spain) Samuel Olias	Superfight Ninove	Ninove, Belgium	Decision (unanimous)	5	3:00
Won the vacant ISKA Muay Thai World World Flyweight (-53.5kg) title.
2024-03-09	Win	(Cambodia) Kun Khmer	Top-action Fight Night	Antwerp, Belgium	TKO (doctor stoppage)	4	
2023-12-09	Win	(Spain) Gonzalo Tebar	All Sports Event	Lommel, Belgium	Decision (unanimous)	5	3:00
2023-10-14	Win	(Thailand) Praipayak Sor.Sommai	Gent Thainight	Gent, Belgium	TKO (referee stoppage)	1	
Won the vacant WMC World Super Bantamweight (122 lbs) title.
2023-05-06	Win	(Republic of Ireland) Philip Nee	Superfight Ninove	Ninove, Belgium	KO (spinning backfist)		
2022-12-03	Win	(Spain) Ismael El Brigui	Gent Thainight	Kortrijk, Belgium	Decision	3	3:00
2022-10-01	Win	(Italy) Giuseppe Gesuito	Gent Thainight	Gent, Belgium	Decision (unanimous)	5	3:00
Won the vacant WMC European Super Bantamweight (122 lbs) title.
2022-03-12	Draw	(France) Meven Jourdain	Ringside One Night Bangkok	Dardilly, France	Decision	3	3:00
2021-11-06	Win	(France) Nicolas Fainsin	Magic Pro Fights	Plouzané, France			
2021-09-26	Win	(Germany) Marvin	Gala Iron Gym	Oupeye, Belgium	KO	2	
2021-07-17	Win	(France) Yanis Soualili	PSM Fight Night	Brussels, Belgium	KO	2	
2020-02-08	Win	(France)	Invictus	Brussels, Belgium	KO	2	
2020-01-25	Win	(France) Joseph Tafari	King Of Brussel	Brussels, Belgium	Decision (unanimous)	5	2:00
2019-12-07	Win	(France) Jean Christophe Gomis	Ultimate Contest	Wevelgem, Belgium			
2019-10-26	Win	(France) Joseph Tafari	King Of Brussel	Brussels, Belgium	KO	2	
2019-02-16	Win	(United Kingdom) Alex Jones	Super Show	Barnsley, United Kingdom			
Legend: Win Loss Draw/No contest Notes

Amateur Muay Thai Record
Date	Result	Opponent	Event	Location	Method	Round	Time
2026-10-23	Win	(Turkey) Yakub Alperen Kaysi	IFMA European Championships 2026, Final	Paris, France	Decision (29:28)	3	3:00
Won the 2026 IFMA European Championships -57kg Gold Medal.
2026-10-23	Win	(Ukraine) Nikita Kuts	IFMA European Championships 2026, Semifinals	Paris, France	TKO	2	
2026-10-21	Win	Ali Ashuri	IFMA European Championships 2026, Quarterfinals	Paris, France	KO	1	
2026-06-25	Win	(United Arab Emirates) Mohamed Touizi	IFMA World Championships 2026, Final	Kuala Lumpur, Malaysia	TKO	3	
Won the 2026 IFMA World Championships -54kg Gold Medal.
2026-06-24	Win	(Russia) Ovsep Aslanyan	IFMA World Championships 2026, Semifinals	Kuala Lumpur, Malaysia	Decision (29:28)	3	3:00
2026-06-22	Win	(Indonesia) Danar Ilmawan	IFMA World Championships 2026, Quarterfinals	Kuala Lumpur, Malaysia	TKO		
2026-06-21	Win	(Thailand) Nopparud Wanpheng	IFMA World Championships 2026, First Round	Kuala Lumpur, Malaysia	TKO	2	
2025-05-31	Win	(Russia) Salavat Isaev	IFMA World Championships 2025, Final	Kemer, Turkey	Decision (29:28)	3	3:00
Won the 2025 IFMA World Championships -54kg Gold Medal.
2025-05-30	Win	(Kazakhstan) Shamil Yermagambetov	IFMA World Championships 2025, Semifinals	Kemer, Turkey	Decision (30:27)	3	3:00
2025-05-28	Win	(Ukraine) Nikita Kuts	IFMA World Championships 2025, Quarterfinals	Kemer, Turkey	Decision (29:28)	3	3:00
2025-05-26	Win	(Hong Kong) Pak Yu Leung	IFMA World Championships 2025, First Round	Kemer, Turkey	KO	1	
2023-06-28	Win	(Turkey) Sercan Koç	2023 European Games, Final	Myślenice, Poland	Decision (29:28)	3	3:00
Won the 2023 European Games -60kg Gold Medal.
2023-06-27	Win	(Armenia) Narek Khachikyan	2023 European Games, Semifinals	Myślenice, Poland	Decision (30:27)	3	3:00
2023-06-26	Win	(Poland) Mariusz Lach	2023 European Games, Quarterfinals	Myślenice, Poland	Decision (30:27)	3	3:00
2022-06-04	Win	(Kazakhstan) Shamil Yermagambetov	IFMA World Championships 2022, Final	Abu Dhabi	Decision (30:27)	3	3:00
Won the 2022 IFMA World Championships -54kg Gold Medal.
2022-06-02	Win	(Turkey) Emre Batuhan Yılmaz	IFMA World Championships 2022, Semifinals	Abu Dhabi	Decision (30:27)	3	3:00
2022-05-31	Win	(Saudi Arabia) Saud Al-Dossari	IFMA World Championships 2022, Quarterfinals	Abu Dhabi	KO	2	
2022-05-29	Win	(Algeria) Noureddine Aissaoui	IFMA World Championships 2022, First Round	Abu Dhabi	Decision (30:27)	3	3:00
2021-12-11	Win	(Portugal) Tiago Melo	IFMA World Championships 2021, Final	Bangkok, Thailand	TKO (injury)	1	
Won the 2021 IFMA World Championships U23 -54kg Gold Medal.
2021-12-10	Win	(Israel) Ruach Gordon	IFMA World Championships 2021, Semifinals	Bangkok, Thailand	Decision (29:28)	3	3:00
2021-12-08	Win	(Moldova) Fiodor Cazanji	IFMA World Championships 2021, Quarterfinals	Bangkok, Thailand	Decision (29:28)	3	3:00
2021-12-07	Win	(Philippines) Aldrich Toralbai	IFMA World Championships 2021, First Round	Bangkok, Thailand	Decision (30:27)	3	3:00
Legend: Win Loss Draw/No contest Notes

== See also ==
- List of male kickboxers
