= Estonia at the 2023 European Games =

- IOC code: EST
- NOC: Estonian Olympic Committee
- Website: www.eok.ee

in Kraków, Poland 21 June 2023 – 2 July 2023
- Competitors: 105 in 17 sports
- Flag bearers: Annika Köster and Joosep Karlson
- Medals Ranked 31st: Gold 2 Silver 1 Bronze 0 Total 3

European Games appearances (overview)
- 2015; 2019; 2023; 2027

Estonia competed at the 2023 European Games, in Kraków, Poland from 21 June to 2 July 2023. This was Estonia's third appearance at the Games and with record number of participating athletes.

== Medalists ==
Estonia at the 2023 European Games in Kraków-Małopolska
Medal	Name	Sport	Event	Date
1st place, gold medalist(s)	Robin Jäätma; Lisell Jäätma	Archery	Mixed team compound	25 June 2023
1st place, gold medalist(s)	Astrid Johanna Grents	Muaythai	Women's 60 kg	27 June 2023
2nd place, silver medalist(s)	Rasmus Mägi	Athletics	400 m hurdles	24 June 2023

== Competitors ==
Sport	Men	Women	Total
Archery	1	2	3
Artistic swimming	0	2	2
Athletics	20	19	39
Badminton	1	3	4
Basketball	4	4	8
Boxing	5	0	5
Canoe sprint	2	0	2
Cycling – BMX	2	1	3
Cycling – Mountain bike	2	3	5
Fencing	4	6	10
Modern pentathlon	1	1	2
Muaythai	0	1	1
Padel	2	2	4
Shooting	6	2	8
Ski jumping	4	0	0
Table tennis	0	2	2
Triathlon	2	1	3
Total	56	49	105

== Archery ==
- Reena Pärnat
- Lisell Jäätma
- Robin Jäätma

== Artistic swimming ==
- Maria Ruditš
- Ksenija Grabtšuk

== Athletics ==
Estonia is set to compete in the second division of the 2023 European Athletics Team Championships which is going to be held in Chorzów during, and as part of, the Games. Estonia will compete in the team event, and each athlete will also be eligible for the individual event medals. The team was announced on 16 June 2023.

== Badminton ==
- Kristin Kuuba
- Karl Kert
- Kati-Kreet Marran
- Helina Rüütel

== Basketball (3x3) ==
Men

- Robin Kivi
- Oliver Metsalu
- Hendrik Eelmäe
- Jaan Puidet

Women

- Marie Anette Sepp
- Sofia Kosareva
- Annika Köster
- Kadri-Ann Lass

== Boxing ==
- Allan Morozov
- Kirill Serikov
- Pavel Kamanin
- Semjon Kamanin
- Stiven Aas

== Canoe sprint ==
- Joosep Karlson
- Kevin Poljans

== Cycling ==
=== BMX ===
- Liis Lokk
- Kristen Põder
- Sander Saard

=== Mountain bike ===
- Janika Lõiv
- Merili Sirvel
- Mari-Liis Mõttus
- Josten Vaidem
- Kirill Tarassov

== Fencing ==
Men's epee ind./team

- Sten Priinits, Jüri Salm, Erik Tobias, Ruslan Eskov

Women's epee individual

- Irina Embrich, Erika Kirpu, Kristina Kuusk, Nelli Differt

Women's epee team

- Irina Embrich, Julia Beljajeva, Katrina Lehis, Nelli Differt

== Modern pentathlon ==
- Johanna Maria Jõgisu
- Carl Robert Kallaste

== Muaythai ==
- Astrid Johanna Grents

== Padel ==
- Emily Hang
- Nora Leinus
- Erko Nigula
- Siim Tuus

== Shooting ==
- Katrin Smirnova
- Kristina Kiisk
- Peeter Olesk
- Andres Kull
- Fred Raukas
- Peeter Jürisson
- Meelis Kiisk
- Nemo Tabur

== Ski jumping ==
- Andero Kapp
- Artti Aigro
- Kaimar Vagul
- Kevin Maltsev

== Table tennis ==
- Reelica Hanson
- Airi Avameri

== Triathlon ==
- Kaidi Kivioja
- Henry Räppo
- Johannes Sikk
