= Greece at the 2023 European Games =

- IOC code: GRE
- NOC: Hellenic Olympic Committee
- Website: www.hoc.gr

in Kraków and Małopolska, Poland 21 June – 2 July 2023
- Competitors: 170 in 19 sports
- Flag bearer: Elina Tzengko
- Medals Ranked 27th: Gold 2 Silver 5 Bronze 10 Total 17

European Games appearances (overview)
- 2015; 2019; 2023; 2027

Greece competed at the 2023 European Games, in Kraków and Małopolska, Poland, from 21 June to 2 July 2023.

== Medalists ==
Medal	Name	Sport	Event
Gold	Miltiadis Tentoglou	Athletics	Men's Long jump
Gold	Anna Korakaki	Shooting	Women's 25 metre pistol
Silver	Emmanouela Katsouraki	Shooting	Women's skeet
Silver	Emmanouil Karalis	Athletics	Men's Pole vault
Silver	Georgios Tsampodimos Leovaris	Kickboxing	Men's Point Fighting -63 kg
Silver	Christos-Stefanos Xenos	Karate	Men's Kumite -60kg
Silver	Dionysios Xenos	Karate	Men's Kumite -67kg
Silver	Emmanouela Katzouraki	Shooting	Women's skeet
Bronze	Theodora Gkountoura	Fencing	Women's Sabre Individual
Bronze	Paraskevi Semeli Zarmakoupi	Kickboxing	Women's Light Contact -50 kg
Bronze	Georgia Archontia Xenou	Karate	Women's Kata
Bronze	Kyriaki Kydonaki	Karate	Women's Kumite +68kg
Bronze	Kyriakos Bakirtzis	Muaythai	Men's Combat -91kg
Bronze	Charalampos Chalkiadakis; Nikolaos Mavrommatis; Efthimios Mitas	Shooting	Skeet Men's Team
Bronze	Sofia Malkogeorgou; Evangelia Platanioti	Artistic swimming	Duet Technical
Bronze	Konstantinos Dimitropoulos	Taekwondo	Men -54kg
Bronze	Konstantinos Chamalidis	Taekwondo	Men -68kg
Bronze	Apostolos Telikostoglou	Taekwondo	Men -80kg
