= Netherlands at the 2023 European Games =

- IOC code: NED
- NOC: NOC*NSF
- Website: www.nocnsf.nl

in Kraków and Małopolska, Poland 21 June 2023 – 2 July 2023
- Competitors: 150+
- Medals Ranked 10th: Gold 8 Silver 6 Bronze 5 Total 19

European Games appearances (overview)
- 2015; 2019; 2023; 2027

The Netherlands competed at the 2023 European Games, in Kraków and Małopolska, Poland from 21 June to 2 July 2023. This was the third appearance of the Netherlands at the Games.

Former Dutch judoka Mark Huizinga served as Chef de Mission.

== Medalists ==
| Medal | Name | Sport | Event | Date |
|---|---|---|---|---|
| Gold | Puck Pieterse | Cycling | Women's cross-country | 25 June |
| Gold | India "India" Sardjoe | Breakdancing | B-Girl | 27 June |
| Gold | Tristan Tulen | Fencing | Men's épée | 27 June |
| Gold | Menno Vloon | Athletics | Men's pole vault | |
| Gold | Lieke Klaver | Athletics | Women's 200 metres | |
| Gold | Femke Bol | Athletics | Women's 400 metres | |
| Gold | N'Ketia Seedo; Lieke Klaver; Jamile Samuel; Tasa Jiya | Athletics | Women's 4 × 100 metres | |
| Gold | Robin Tabeling; Selena Piek | Badminton | Mixed doubles | 2 July |
| Silver | Brian Timmermans | Karate | Men's kumite 84 kg | 23 June |
| Silver | Bregje de Brouwer; Marloes Steenbeek | Artistic swimming | Duet technical | 22 June |
| Silver | Menno "Menno" van Gorp | Breakdancing | B-Boy | 27 June |
| Silver | Raphael Bouju | Athletics | Men's 100 metres | |
| Silver | Nadine Visser | Athletics | Women's 100 m hurdles | |
| Silver | Debora Jille; Cheryl Seinen | Badminton | Women's doubles | 1 July |
| Bronze | Koen Heg; Frank de Wit; Jesper Smink; Michael Korrel; Jelle Snippe; Pleuni Cornelisse; Hilde Jager; Sanne van Dijke; Karen Stevenson; Marit Kamps | Judo | Mixed team | 1 July |
| Bronze | Liemarvin Bonevacia | Athletics | Men's 400 metres | |
| Bronze | Niels Laros | Athletics | Men's 1500 metres | |
| Bronze | N'Ketia Seedo | Athletics | Women's 100 metres | |
| Bronze | Cathelijn Peeters | Athletics | Women's 400 m hurdles | |

== Archery ==
The Netherlands competed in archery.

| Athlete | Event | Ranking round | | Round of 64 | Round of 32 | Round of 16 | Quarterfinal | Semi-final | Final / BM | |
| Athlete | Event | Score | Seed | Opposition Score | Opposition Score | Opposition Score | Opposition Score | Opposition Score | Opposition Score | Rank |
|---|---|---|---|---|---|---|---|---|---|---|
| Steve Wijler | Men's individual recurve | 678 | 7 | Bye | Sierakowski (POL); W 6–4 | Paoli (ITA); W 6–4 | Unruh (GER); L 5–6 | Did not advance | | |
| Senna Roos | Men's individual recurve | 680 | 5 | Bye | Balogh (HUN); W 6–2 | Olaru (MDA); L 5–6 | Did not advance | | | |
| Gijs Broeksma | Men's individual recurve | 675 | 11 | Bye | Faber (SUI); W 7–1 | Valladont (FRA); L 4–6 | Did not advance | | | |
| Steve Wijler; Senna Roos; Gijs Broeksma | Men's team recurve | 2033 GR | 1 | —N/a | | | Poland; W 6–2 | Italy; L 4–5 | Switzerland; L 2–6 | 4 |
| Gabriela Schloesser | Women's individual recurve | 647 | 20 | Myszor (POL); W 7–1 | Boari (ITA); L 4–6 | Did not advance | | | | |
| Mike Schloesser | Men's individual compound | 718 GR | 1 | —N/a | | Benschjöld (SWE); W 149–144 | Bruno (ITA); L 148^{10}–148^{10+} | Did not advance | | |
| Sanne de Laat | Women's individual compound | 696 | 9 | —N/a | | Dodemont (FRA); W 145–143 | Gibson (GBR); L 142–143 | Did not advance | | |
| Sanne de Laat; Mike Schloesser | Mixed team compound | 1414 | 4 | —N/a | | Bye | Italy; L 156^{20}–156^{20+} | Did not advance | | |

== Artistic swimming ==
The Netherlands competed in artistic swimming.

| Athlete | Event | Qualification | | Final | |
| Athlete | Event | Points | Rank | Points | Rank |
|---|---|---|---|---|---|
| Bregje de Brouwer; Marloes Steenbeek | Duet technical | —N/a | | 248.4283 | 2nd place, silver medalist(s) |
| Bregje de Brouwer; Marloes Steenbeek | Duet free | 185.2814 | 7 | 196.5523 | 5 |

== Athletics ==
The Netherlands competed in the first division of the 2023 European Athletics Team Championships which was held in Chorzów during, and as part of, the Games. Netherlands competed in the team event, and each athlete was also eligible for the individual event medals.

=== European Athletics Team Championships First Division ===
| Team | Event | | Event points *** | | | | | | | | | | | | | | | | | | | Total points | Rank |
| Team | Event | | 100m | 200m | 400m | 800m | 1500m | 5000m | 110m h* | 400m h | 3000m SC | 4 × 100 m | 4 × 400 m** | SP | JT | HT | DT | PV | HJ | TJ | LJ | Total points | Rank |
|---|---|---|---|---|---|---|---|---|---|---|---|---|---|---|---|---|---|---|---|---|---|---|---|
| Netherlands (see below) | Team Championships First Division | Men | 15 | 13 | 14 | 13 | 14 | 6 | 4 | 14 | 6 | 13 | 3 | 4 | 7 | 3 | 5 | 16 | 8.5 | 6 | 8 | 339.5 | 6 |
| Netherlands (see below) | Team Championships First Division | Women | 14 | 16 | 16 | 1 | 7 | 1 | 15 | 14 | 9 | 16 | 3 | 13 | 6 | 3 | 8 | 5 | 6 | 4 | 12 | 339.5 | 6 |

key: h: hurdles; SC; Steeplechase: SP; Shot put: JT: Javelin: HT: Hammer: DT: Discus: PV: Pole vault: HJ: High jump: TJ: Triple Jump: LJ: Long Jump

- Women compete at 100 metre hurdles, rather than 110 metre hurdles.
- 4 x 400 metres is held as a single mixed sex event
- Event points indicate placings in the First Division match. Individual medals are across all three divisions.

== Badminton ==
The Netherlands competed in badminton.

| Athletes | Event | Group stage | | | | Round of 16 | Quarter-finals | Semi-finals | Final | Rank |
| Athletes | Event | Opposition Score | Opposition Score | Opposition Score | Rank | Opposition Score | Opposition Score | Opposition Score | Opposition Score | Rank |
|---|---|---|---|---|---|---|---|---|---|---|
| Mark Caljouw | Men's singles | Torjussen (GBR); W (22–24, 22–20, 21–16 ) | Dratva (SVK); W (21–19, 21–13) | Nguyen (IRL); W (21–16, 21–15) | 1 Q | Yanakiev (BUL); W (21–17, 21–10) | C Popov (FRA); L (6–21, 21–9, 23–25) | Did not advance | | |
| Ruben Jille; Ties van der Lecq | Men's doubles | Björnsson / Finnsson (ISL); W (21–7, 21–14) | Flåtten / Rikheim (NOR); W (21–17, 21–10) | Astrup / Rasmussen (DEN); L (9–21, 10–21) | 2 Q | —N/a | Lane / Vendy (GBR); L (15–21, 15–21) | Did not advance | | |
| Jaymie Laurens | Women's singles | Dąbczyńska (POL); W (23–21, 21–10) | Gilmour (GBR); L (13–21, 9–21) | Christodoulou (CYP); W (24–22, 21–16) | 2 Q | Blichfeldt (DEN); L (7–21, 7–21) | Did not advance | | | |
| Debora Jille; Cheryl Seinen | Women's doubles | Au Yeong / Hochmeir (AUT); W (21–16, 21–17) | Azzahra / Maftuha (AZE); W (21–10, 21–12) | Azurmendi / Corrales (ESP); W (21–12, 21–17) | 1 Q | —N/a | Marran / Rüütel (EST); W (19–21, 21–16, 21–17) | Efler / Lohau (GER); W (21–14, 19–21, 21–17) | G Stoeva / S Stoeva (BUL); L (7–21, 17–21) | 2nd place, silver medalist(s) |
| Robin Tabeling; Selena Piek | Mixed doubles | M Zilberman / S Zilberman (ISR); W (~~21–10, 21–9~~) | Stoynov / Popovska (BUL); W (21–8, 21–10) | Śmiłowski / Świerczyńska (POL); W (21–13, 21–18) | 1 Q | —N/a | Magee / Ryan (IRL); W (21–8, 21–8) | Christiansen / Bøje (DEN); W (21–14, 21–13) | Gicquel / Delrue (FRA); W (21–10, 13–21, 21–13) | 1st place, gold medalist(s) |

== Basketball ==
The Netherlands competed in 3x3 basketball.

| Team | Event | Group stage | | | | Quarterfinals | Semifinals | Final / BM | |
| Team | Event | Opposition Score | Opposition Score | Opposition Score | Rank | Opposition Score | Opposition Score | Opposition Score | Rank |
|---|---|---|---|---|---|---|---|---|---|
| Nesta Agasi; Olusheyi Adetunji; Luuk Slond; Norbert Thelissen | Men's tournament | Czech Republic; L 16-21 | France; L 16-19 | Israel; L 8-22 | 4 | Did not advance | | | |
| Janis Boonstra; Jacobine Klerx; Evelien Lutje Schipholt; Emy Hayford | Women's tournament | Switzerland; W 20-14 | Spain; L 8-21 | Israel; L 19-20 | 3 | Did not advance | | | |

== Beach handball ==
The Netherlands competed in beach handball.

| Team | Event | Group stage | | | | Quarterfinals | Semifinals | Final / BM | |
| Team | Event | Opposition Score | Opposition Score | Opposition Score | Rank | Opposition Score | Opposition Score | Opposition Score | Rank |
|---|---|---|---|---|---|---|---|---|---|
| Netherlands | Women's tournament | Portugal; W 2-0 | Greece; W 2-0 | Germany; W 2-0 | 1 Q | Norway; L 0-2 | Did not advance | | 5 |

== Boxing ==
The Netherlands competed in boxing.

| Athlete | Event | Round of 32 | Round of 16 | Quarterfinal | Semi-final | Final | |
| Athlete | Event | Opposition Result | Opposition Result | Opposition Result | Opposition Result | Opposition Result | Rank |
|---|---|---|---|---|---|---|---|
| Tony Jas | Men's 71 kg | Kiwan (BUL); L 0–5 | Did not advance | | | | |
| Gradus Kraus | Men's 80 kg | Janečka (CZE); W RSC-I | Liorančas (LTU); W w/o | Cavallaro (ITA); L 0–5 | Did not advance | | |
| Stan Bertens | Men's +92 kg | Tiafack (GER); L 0–5 | Did not advance | | | | |
| Chelsey Heijnen | Women's 60 kg | Bye | Mossely (FRA); L 0–5 | Did not advance | | | |
| Luna Beeloo | Women's 66 kg | Bye | Bova (UKR); W 4–1 | Hámori (HUN); L 0–5 | Did not advance | | |

== Breakdancing ==
The Netherlands competed in breakdancing. India "India" Sardjoe won the gold medal in the B-Girl event and Menno "Menno" van Gorp won the silver medal in the B-Boy event.

== Canoe slalom ==
The Netherlands competed in canoe slalom.

== Cycling ==
The Netherlands competed in cycling.

=== Mountain bike ===
| Athlete | Event | Time | Rank |
|---|---|---|---|
| David Nordemann | Men's cross country | Did not finish | |
| Milan Vader | Men's cross country | 1:27:41 | 46 |
| Ceylin del Carmen Alvarado | Women's cross country | 1:24:05 | 20 |
| Fem van Empel | Women's cross country | 1:21:14 | 10 |
| Lotte Koopmans | Women's cross country | 1:26:48 | 29 |
| Puck Pieterse | Women's cross country | 1:18:26 | 1st place, gold medalist(s) |
| Anne Tauber | Women's cross country | Did not start | |
| Anne Terpstra | Women's cross country | 1:20:05 | 6 |

=== BMX (park) ===
| Athlete | Event | Seeding | | | | Final | | |
| Athlete | Event | Run 1 | Run 2 | Average | Rank | Run 1 | Run 2 | Rank |
|---|---|---|---|---|---|---|---|---|
| Tom van den Boogaard | Men's BMX park | 77.33 | 79.83 | 78.58 | 5 Q | 61.33 | ~~12.76~~ | 12 |
| Levi Weidmann | Men's BMX park | 77.33 | 71.00 | 74.16 | 11 Q | 72.66 | ~~52.16~~ | 9 |

== Diving ==
The Netherlands competed in diving.

| Athlete | Events | Preliminary | | Final | |
| Athlete | Events | Points | Rank | Points | Rank |
|---|---|---|---|---|---|
| Celine van Duijn | Women's 3 m springboard | 227.50 | 16 | Did not advance | |
| Celine van Duijn; Inge Jansen | Women's 3 m synchro springboard | —N/a | | 272.10 | 4 |
| Else Praasterink | Women's 10 metre platform | 270.85 | 6 | 278.15 | 7 |

== Fencing ==
The Netherlands competed in fencing.

== Judo ==
The Netherlands competed in judo.

| Athlete | Category | Round of 16 | Quarterfinals | Semifinals | Final | |
| Athlete | Category | Opposition Result | Opposition Result | Opposition Result | Opposition Result | Rank |
|---|---|---|---|---|---|---|
| Koen Heg; Frank de Wit; Jesper Smink; Michael Korrel; Jelle Snippe; Pleuni Cornelisse; Hilde Jager; Sanne van Dijke; Karen Stevenson; Marit Kamps | Mixed team | Slovenia; W 4–1 | Portugal; W 4–0 | Germany; L 2–4 | France; W 4–1 | 3rd place, bronze medalist(s) |

== Karate ==
The Netherlands competed in karate.

| Athlete | Event | Group stage | | | | Semifinal | Final | |
| Athlete | Event | Opposition Score | Opposition Score | Opposition Score | Rank | Opposition Score | Opposition Score | Rank |
|---|---|---|---|---|---|---|---|---|
| Brian Timmermans | −84 kg | Martina (ITA); L 1–3 | Chobotar (UKR); W 1–0 | Kiparoidze (GEO); W 3–1 | 2 | Bąbos (POL); W 6–1 | Karaqi (ALB); L 2–3 | 2nd place, silver medalist(s) |
| Lynn Snel | −61 kg | Khamis (GER); L 0–4 | Gözütok (TUR); L 0–1 | Mikulska (POL); W 6–1 | 3 | Did not advance | | 5 |

== Kickboxing ==
The Netherlands competed in kickboxing.

- Carvin Burke
- Sam Delrock
- Francesca Prescimone

== Padel ==
The Netherlands competed in padel.

| Athlete | Event | Round of 32 | Round of 16 | Quarterfinal | Semi-final | Final / BM | |
| Athlete | Event | Opposition Score | Opposition Score | Opposition Score | Opposition Score | Opposition Score | Rank |
|---|---|---|---|---|---|---|---|
| Bram Meijer; Sten Richters | Men's doubles | | | | | | |
| Menno Nolten; Robin Sietsma | Men's doubles | | | | | | |
| Steffie Weterings; Marcella Koek | Women's doubles | | | | | | |
| Maaike Betz; Janine Hemmes | Women's doubles | | | | | | |
| Janine Hemmes; Sten Richters | Mixed doubles | —N/a | | | | | |
| Bram Meijer; Steffie Weterings | Mixed doubles | —N/a | | | | | |

== Shooting ==
The Netherlands competed in shooting.

| Athlete | Event | Qualification | | Final | |
| Athlete | Event | Points | Rank | Points | Rank |
|---|---|---|---|---|---|
| Tobias Haccou | Men's skeet | 114 | 30 | Did not advance | |
| Esmée van der Veen | Women's skeet | 112 | 24 | Did not advance | |
| Tobias Haccou; Esmée van der Veen | Mixed team skeet | 137 | 17 | Did not advance | |

== Sport climbing ==
The Netherlands competed in sport climbing.

| Athlete | Event | Semifinal | | Final | |
| Athlete | Event | Result | Rank | Result | Rank |
|---|---|---|---|---|---|
| Leto Cavé | Men's lead | 28+ | 16 | Did not advance | |
| Lynn van der Meer | Women's lead | 45+ | 4 | 35+ | 6 |
| Don van Laere | Men's boulder | 0T4z 0 9 | 9 | Did not advance | |
| Lisa Klem | Women's boulder | 0T2z 0 8 | 12 | Did not advance | |

== Table tennis ==
The Netherlands competed in table tennis.

| Athlete | Event | Round 1 | Round 2 | Round of 32 | Round of 16 | Quarterfinal | Semi-final | Final / BM | |
| Athlete | Event | Opposition Result | Opposition Result | Opposition Result | Opposition Result | Opposition Result | Opposition Result | Opposition Result | Rank |
|---|---|---|---|---|---|---|---|---|---|
| Tanja Helle | Women's singles | Bye | Moret (SUI); W 4–3 | Yang (MON); L 0–4 | Did not advance | | | | |
| Shuhoan Men | Women's singles | Bye | Xiao (ESP); L 1–4 | Did not advance | | | | | |

== Taekwondo ==
The Netherlands competed in taekwondo.

| Athlete | Event | Round of 16 | Quarterfinals | Semifinals | Repechage | Bronze medal | Final | |
| Athlete | Event | Opposition Result | Opposition Result | Opposition Result | Opposition Result | Opposition Result | Opposition Result | Rank |
|---|---|---|---|---|---|---|---|---|
| Milan Molle | Men's 54 kg | Sarsoza (GBR); W 2–0 | Arillo (ESP); L 0–2 | —N/a | Dimitropolous (GRE); L 0–2 | Did not advance | | |
| Aymen Achnine | Men's 58 kg | Magomedov (AZE); L 0–2 | Did not advance | | | | | |
| Bryan Zonderop | Men's +87 kg | Trajkovič (SLO); W 2–0 | García (ESP); L 1–2 | Did not advance | | | | |
| Bodine Schoenmakers | Women's 57 kg | Tomić (CRO); L 0–2 | Did not advance | | | | | |
| Amy Mink | Women's 67 kg | Castro (ESP); L 0–2 | —N/a | —N/a | D'Angelo (ITA); L 1–2 | Did not advance | | |

== Triathlon ==
The Netherlands competed in triathlon.

| Athlete | Event | Time | Difference | Rank |
|---|---|---|---|---|
| Donald Hillebregt | Men | 1:55:00 | +8:10 | 50 |
| Mitch Kolkman | Men | 1:49:38 | +2:48 | 27 |
| Barbara de Koning | Women | 1:58:23 | +1:18 | 13 |
| Marit van den Berg | Women | 2:11:05 | +14:00 | 41 |
| Donald Hillebregt; Mitch Kolkman; Barbara de Koning; Marit van den Berg | Mixed relay | Did not start | | |
