= Badminton at the 2023 European Games – Women's doubles =

Badminton's women's doubles at the 2023 European Games
- Venue: Arena Jaskółka, Tarnów
- Dates: 26 June - 1 July
- Competitors: 32 from 16 nations

Medalists
gold medal	Gabriela Stoeva; Stefani Stoeva	Bulgaria
silver medal	Debora Jille; Cheryl Seinen	Netherlands
bronze medal	Margot Lambert; Anne Tran	France
bronze medal	Linda Efler; Isabel Lohau	Germany

The women's doubles badminton tournament at the 2023 European Games was played from 26 June to 1 July 2023 in Arena Jaskółka, Tarnów. A total of 32 players in 16 pairs competed at the tournament, four of which pairs was seeded.

== Competition format ==
The tournament starts with a group phase round-robin which will eliminate 8 pairs, followed by a single-elimination knockout stage. For the group stage, the players are divided into four groups of four. Each group plays a round-robin. The top two pairs in each group advanced to the knockout rounds. The knockout stage is a three-round single elimination tournament without a bronze medal match.

Matches are played best-of-three games. Each game is played to 21, except that a player must win by 2 unless the score reaches 30–29.

== Seeding ==
The following pairs were seeded

1. (Bulgaria) Gabriela Stoeva / Stefani Stoeva (Gold medalists)
2. (Denmark) Maiken Fruergaard / Sara Thygesen (Quarter-finals)
3. (France) Margot Lambert / Anne Tran (Bronze medalists)
4. (Netherlands) Debora Jille / Cheryl Seinen (Silver medalists)

== Competition schedule ==
Play will take place between 26 June and 1 July.

GS	Group stage	R16	Round of 16	¼	Quarterfinals	½	Semifinals	F	Final

Events	Mon 26	Tue 27	Wed 28	Thu 29	Fri 30	Sat 1	Sun 2
Women's doubles	GS	GS	GS	¼	½	F	

== Pool Stage ==
=== Group A ===
Pos	Team	Pld	W	L	GF	GA	GD	PF	PA	PD	Qualification
1	Gabriela Stoeva (BUL) [1] Stefani Stoeva (BUL)	3	3	0	6	0	+6	126	46	+80	Qualification to knock-out stage
2	Kati-Kreet Marran (EST) Helina Rüütel (EST)	3	2	1	4	2	+2	111	92	+19	Qualification to knock-out stage
3	Dominika Kwaśnik (POL) Kornelia Marczak (POL) (H)	3	1	2	2	4	−2	76	109	−33	
4	Marie Christensen (NOR) Aimee Hong (NOR)	3	0	3	0	6	−6	60	126	−66	

(H) Host

Date		Score		Game 1	Game 2	Game 3
26 June	Marie Christensen (Norway); Aimee Hong (Norway)	0–2	(Estonia) Kati-Kreet Marran (Estonia) Helina Rüütel	15–21	11–21	
26 June	Gabriela Stoeva (Bulgaria); Stefani Stoeva (Bulgaria)	2–0	(Poland) Dominika Kwaśnik (Poland) Kornelia Marczak	21–4	21–6	
27 June	Marie Christensen (Norway); Aimee Hong (Norway)	0–2	(Poland) Dominika Kwaśnik (Poland) Kornelia Marczak	8–21	17–21	
27 June	Gabriela Stoeva (Bulgaria); Stefani Stoeva (Bulgaria)	2–0	(Estonia) Kati-Kreet Marran (Estonia) Helina Rüütel	21–15	21–12	
28 June	Gabriela Stoeva (Bulgaria); Stefani Stoeva (Bulgaria)	2–0	(Norway) Marie Christensen (Norway) Aimee Hong	21–2	21–7	
28 June	Kati-Kreet Marran (Estonia); Helina Rüütel (Estonia)	2–0	(Poland) Dominika Kwaśnik (Poland) Kornelia Marczak	21–17	21–7	

=== Group B ===
Pos	Team	Pld	W	L	GF	GA	GD	PF	PA	PD	Qualification
1	Maiken Fruergaard (DEN) [2] Sara Thygesen (DEN)	3	3	0	6	0	+6	126	57	+69	Qualification to knock-out stage
2	Julie MacPherson (GBR) Ciara Torrance (GBR)	3	2	1	4	2	+2	100	101	−1	Qualification to knock-out stage
3	Mariia Stoliarenko (UKR) Yelyzaveta Zharka (UKR)	3	1	2	2	4	−2	98	116	−18	
4	Martina Corsini (ITA) Judith Mair (ITA)	3	0	3	0	6	−6	76	126	−50	

Date		Score		Game 1	Game 2	Game 3
26 June	Maiken Fruergaard (Denmark); Sara Thygesen (Denmark)	2–0	(Italy) Martina Corsini (Italy) Judith Mair	21–8	21–11	
26 June	Mariia Stoliarenko (Ukraine); Yelyzaveta Zharka (Ukraine)	0–2	(United Kingdom) Julie MacPherson (United Kingdom) Ciara Torrance	17–21	17–21	
27 June	Maiken Fruergaard (Denmark); Sara Thygesen (Denmark)	2–0	(United Kingdom) Julie MacPherson (United Kingdom) Ciara Torrance	21–10	21–6	
27 June	Mariia Stoliarenko (Ukraine); Yelyzaveta Zharka (Ukraine)	2–0	(Italy) Martina Corsini (Italy) Judith Mair	21–14	21–18	
28 June	Maiken Fruergaard (Denmark); Sara Thygesen (Denmark)	2–0	(Ukraine) Mariia Stoliarenko (Ukraine) Yelyzaveta Zharka	21–9	21–13	
28 June	Julie MacPherson (United Kingdom); Ciara Torrance (United Kingdom)	2–0	(Italy) Martina Corsini (Italy) Judith Mair	21–11	21–14	

=== Group C ===
Pos	Team	Pld	W	L	GF	GA	GD	PF	PA	PD	Qualification
1	Margot Lambert (FRA) [3] Anne Tran (FRA)	3	3	0	6	0	+6	126	63	+63	Qualification to knock-out stage
2	Linda Efler (GER) Isabel Lohau (GER)	3	2	1	4	2	+2	116	93	+23	Qualification to knock-out stage
3	Moa Sjöö (SWE) Tilda Sjöö (SWE)	3	1	2	2	4	−2	84	109	−25	
4	Kate Frost (IRL) Moya Ryan (IRL)	3	0	3	0	6	−6	65	126	−61	

Date		Score		Game 1	Game 2	Game 3
26 June	Moa Sjöö (Sweden); Tilda Sjöö (Sweden)	0–2	(Germany) Linda Efler (Germany) Isabel Lohau	12–21	14–21	
26 June	Margot Lambert (France); Anne Tran (France)	2–0	(Republic of Ireland) Kate Frost (Republic of Ireland) Moya Ryan	21–7	21–8	
27 June	Margot Lambert (France); Anne Tran (France)	2–0	(Germany) Linda Efler (Germany) Isabel Lohau	21–16	21–16	
27 June	Moa Sjöö (Sweden); Tilda Sjöö (Sweden)	2–0	(Republic of Ireland) Kate Frost (Republic of Ireland) Moya Ryan	21–14	21–11	
28 June	Margot Lambert (France); Anne Tran (France)	2–0	(Sweden) Moa Sjöö (Sweden) Tilda Sjöö	21–7	21–9	
28 June	Linda Efler (Germany); Isabel Lohau (Germany)	2–0	(Republic of Ireland) Kate Frost (Republic of Ireland) Moya Ryan	21–17	21–8	

=== Group D ===
Pos	Team	Pld	W	L	GF	GA	GD	PF	PA	PD	Qualification
1	Debora Jille (NED) [4] Cheryl Seinen (NED)	3	3	0	6	0	+6	126	84	+42	Qualification to knock-out stage
2	Clara Azurmendi (ESP) Beatriz Corrales (ESP)	3	2	1	4	3	+1	128	104	+24	Qualification to knock-out stage
3	Keisha Fatimah Azzahra (AZE) Era Maftuha (AZE)	3	1	2	2	5	−3	102	141	−39	
4	Serena Au Yeong (AUT) Katharina Hochmeir (AUT)	3	0	3	2	6	−4	130	157	−27	

Date		Score		Game 1	Game 2	Game 3
26 June	Debora Jille (Netherlands); Cheryl Seinen (Netherlands)	2–0	(Austria) Serena Au Yeong (Austria) Katharina Hochmeir	21–16	21–17	
26 June	Clara Azurmendi (Spain); Beatriz Corrales (Spain)	2–0	(Azerbaijan) Keisha Fatimah Azzahra (Azerbaijan) Era Maftuha	21–5	21–17	
27 June	Debora Jille (Netherlands); Cheryl Seinen (Netherlands)	2–0	(Azerbaijan) Keisha Fatimah Azzahra (Azerbaijan) Era Maftuha	21–10	21–12	
27 June	Clara Azurmendi (Spain); Beatriz Corrales (Spain)	2–1	(Austria) Serena Au Yeong (Austria) Katharina Hochmeir	15–21	21–11	21–8
28 June	Debora Jille (Netherlands); Cheryl Seinen (Netherlands)	2–0	(Spain) Clara Azurmendi (Spain) Beatriz Corrales	21–12	21–17	
28 June	Keisha Fatimah Azzahra (Azerbaijan); Era Maftuha (Azerbaijan)	2–1	(Austria) Serena Au Yeong (Austria) Katharina Hochmeir	16–21	21–19	21–17

== Knockout stage ==
The 8 surviving pairs will be drawn in a single elimination tournament, with group winners paired in the quarter final with runners up from other groups. There will be no bronze medal match, and both losing semi-finalists will win a bronze medal.

Quarter finals
1	Gabriela Stoeva (BUL); Stefani Stoeva (BUL)	21	21
Clara Azurmendi (ESP); Beatriz Corrales (ESP)	14	14
3	Margot Lambert (FRA); Anne Tran (FRA)	21	16	21
Julie MacPherson (GBR); Ciara Torrance (GBR)	13	21	13
Kati-Kreet Marran (EST); Helina Rüütel (EST)	21	16	17
4	Debora Jille (NED); Cheryl Seinen (NED)	19	21	21
Linda Efler (GER); Isabel Lohau (GER)	16	23	21
2	Maiken Fruergaard (DEN); Sara Thygesen (DEN)	21	21	16

Semi finals
1	Gabriela Stoeva (BUL); Stefani Stoeva (BUL)	17	21	21
3	Margot Lambert (FRA); Anne Tran (FRA)	21	14	12
4	Debora Jille (NED); Cheryl Seinen (NED)	21	19	21
Linda Efler (GER); Isabel Lohau (GER)	14	21	17

Gold medal match
1	Gabriela Stoeva (BUL); Stefani Stoeva (BUL)	21	21
4	Debora Jille (NED); Cheryl Seinen (NED)	7	17
