= Badminton at the 2023 European Games – Mixed doubles =

Badminton's mixed doubles at the 2023 European Games
- Venue: Arena Jaskółka, Tarnów
- Dates: 26 June - 2 July
- Competitors: 32 from 16 nations

Medalists
gold medal	Robin Tabeling; Selena Piek	Netherlands
silver medal	Thom Gicquel; Delphine Delrue	France
bronze medal	Marcus Ellis; Lauren Smith	Great Britain
bronze medal	Mathias Christiansen; Alexandra Bøje	Denmark

The mixed doubles badminton tournament at the 2023 European Games was played from 26 June to 2 July 2023 in Arena Jaskółka, Tarnów. A total of 32 players in 16 pairs competed at the tournament, four of which pairs was seeded.

Reigning champions, Marcus Ellis and Lauren Smith of Great Britain return to defend their titles.

== Competition format ==
The tournament starts with a group phase round-robin which will eliminate 8 pairs, followed by a single-elimination knockout stage. For the group stage, the pairs are divided into four groups of four. Each group plays a round-robin. The top two pairs in each group advanced to the knockout rounds. The knockout stage is a three-round single elimination tournament without a bronze medal match.

Matches are played best-of-three games. Each game is played to 21, except that a player must win by 2 unless the score reaches 30–29.

== Seeding ==
The following pairs were seeded:

1. (France) Thom Gicquel / Delphine Delrue (Silver medalists)
2. (Netherlands) Robin Tabeling / Selena Piek (Gold medalists)
3. (Denmark) Mathias Christiansen / Alexandra Bøje (Bronze medalists)
4. (Germany) Mark Lamsfuß / Isabel Lohau (Quarter-finals)

== Competition schedule ==
Play will take place between 26 June and 2 July.

GS	Group stage	R16	Round of 16	¼	Quarterfinals	½	Semifinals	F	Final

Events	Mon 26	Tue 27	Wed 28	Thu 29	Fri 30	Sat 1	Sun 2
Mixed doubles	GS	GS		GS	¼	½	F

== Pool Stage ==
=== Group A ===
Pos	Team	Pld	W	L	GF	GA	GD	PF	PA	PD	Qualification
1	Thom Gicquel (FRA) [1] Delphine Delrue (FRA)	2	2	0	4	0	+4	84	48	+36	Qualification to knock-out stage
2	Joshua Magee (IRL) Moya Ryan (IRL)	2	1	1	2	2	0	71	69	+2	Qualification to knock-out stage
3	Gianmarco Bailetti (ITA) Martina Corsini (ITA)	2	0	2	0	4	−4	46	84	−38	
4	Milan Dratva (SVK) Katarína Vargová (SVK)	0	0	0	0	0	0	0	0	0	

Date		Score		Game 1	Game 2	Game 3
26 June	Joshua Magee (Republic of Ireland); Moya Ryan (Republic of Ireland)	2–0	(Italy) Gianmarco Bailetti (Italy) Martina Corsini	21–14	21–13	
26 June	Thom Gicquel (France); Delphine Delrue (France)	~~2–0~~	(Slovakia) Milan Dratva (Slovakia) Katarína Vargová	~~21–14~~	~~21–11~~	
27 June	Thom Gicquel (France); Delphine Delrue (France)	2–0	(Italy) Gianmarco Bailetti (Italy) Martina Corsini	21–9	21–10	
27 June	Joshua Magee (Republic of Ireland); Moya Ryan (Republic of Ireland)	~~2–0~~	(Slovakia) Milan Dratva (Slovakia) Katarína Vargová	~~21–5~~	~~21–15~~	
29 June	Thom Gicquel (France); Delphine Delrue (France)	2–0	(Republic of Ireland) Joshua Magee (Republic of Ireland) Moya Ryan	21–12	21–17	
29 June	Gianmarco Bailetti (Italy); Martina Corsini (Italy)	w/o	(Slovakia) Milan Dratva (Slovakia) Katarína Vargová			

=== Group B ===
Pos	Team	Pld	W	L	GF	GA	GD	PF	PA	PD	Qualification
1	Robin Tabeling (NED) [2] Selena Piek (NED)	2	2	0	4	0	+4	84	49	+35	Qualification to knock-out stage
2	Paweł Śmiłowski (POL) Magdalena Świerczyńska (POL) (H)	2	1	1	2	3	−1	98	95	+3	Qualification to knock-out stage
3	Iliyan Stoynov (BUL) Hristomira Popovska (BUL)	2	0	2	1	4	−3	71	109	−38	
4	Misha Zilberman (ISR) Svetlana Zilberman (ISR)	0	0	0	0	0	0	0	0	0	

(H) Host

Date		Score		Game 1	Game 2	Game 3
26 June	Robin Tabeling (Netherlands); Selena Piek (Netherlands)	~~2–0~~	(Israel) Misha Zilberman (Israel) Svetlana Zilberman	~~21–10~~	~~21–9~~	
26 June	Paweł Śmiłowski (Poland); Magdalena Świerczyńska (Poland)	2–1	(Bulgaria) Iliyan Stoynov (Bulgaria) Hristomira Popovska	25–27	21–12	21–14
27 June	Robin Tabeling (Netherlands); Selena Piek (Netherlands)	2–0	(Bulgaria) Iliyan Stoynov (Bulgaria) Hristomira Popovska	21–8	21–10	
27 June	Paweł Śmiłowski (Poland); Magdalena Świerczyńska (Poland)	~~2–0~~	(Israel) Misha Zilberman (Israel) Svetlana Zilberman	~~21–11~~	~~21–11~~	
29 June	Robin Tabeling (Netherlands); Selena Piek (Netherlands)	2–0	(Poland) Paweł Śmiłowski (Poland) Magdalena Świerczyńska	21–13	21–18	
29 June	Iliyan Stoynov (Bulgaria); Hristomira Popovska (Bulgaria)	w/o	(Israel) Misha Zilberman (Israel) Svetlana Zilberman			

=== Group C ===
Pos	Team	Pld	W	L	GF	GA	GD	PF	PA	PD	Qualification
1	Mathias Christiansen (DEN) [3] Alexandra Bøje (DEN)	3	3	0	6	0	+6	126	70	+56	Qualification to knock-out stage
2	Mihajlo Tomić (SRB) Andjela Vitman (SRB)	3	2	1	4	2	+2	112	105	+7	Qualification to knock-out stage
3	Minh Quang Pham (SUI) Caroline Racloz (SUI)	3	1	2	2	4	−2	97	112	−15	
4	Frederik Kristensen (NOR) Aimee Hong (NOR)	3	0	3	0	6	−6	78	126	−48	

Date		Score		Game 1	Game 2	Game 3
26 June	Frederik Kristensen (Norway); Aimee Hong (Norway)	0–2	(Serbia) Mihajlo Tomić (Serbia) Andjela Vitman	17–21	16–21	
26 June	Mathias Christiansen (Denmark); Alexandra Bøje (Denmark)	2–0	(Switzerland) Minh Quang Pham (Switzerland) Caroline Racloz	21–15	21–10	
27 June	Mathias Christiansen (Denmark); Alexandra Bøje (Denmark)	2–0	(Serbia) Mihajlo Tomić (Serbia) Andjela Vitman	21–17	21–11	
27 June	Frederik Kristensen (Norway); Aimee Hong (Norway)	0–2	(Switzerland) Minh Quang Pham (Switzerland) Caroline Racloz	18–21	10–21	
29 June	Mihajlo Tomić (Serbia); Andjela Vitman (Serbia)	2–0	(Switzerland) Minh Quang Pham (Switzerland) Caroline Racloz	21–15	21–15	
29 June	Mathias Christiansen (Denmark); Alexandra Bøje (Denmark)	2–0	(Norway) Frederik Kristensen (Norway) Aimee Hong	21–6	21–11	

=== Group D ===
Pos	Team	Pld	W	L	GF	GA	GD	PF	PA	PD	Qualification
1	Marcus Ellis (GBR) Lauren Smith (GBR)	3	3	0	6	1	+5	142	88	+54	Qualification to knock-out stage
2	Mark Lamsfuß (GER) [4] Isabel Lohau (GER)	3	2	1	5	2	+3	132	110	+22	Qualification to knock-out stage
3	Philip Birker (AUT) Katharina Hochmeir (AUT)	3	1	2	2	4	−2	85	109	−24	
4	Miha Ivančič (SLO) Petra Polanc (SLO)	3	0	3	0	6	−6	74	126	−52	

Date		Score		Game 1	Game 2	Game 3
26 June	Mark Lamsfuß (Germany); Isabel Lohau (Germany)	2–0	(Austria) Philip Birker (Austria) Katharina Hochmeir	21–12	21–12	
26 June	Miha Ivančič (Slovenia); Petra Polanc (Slovenia)	0–2	(United Kingdom) Marcus Ellis (United Kingdom) Lauren Smith	8–21	13–21	
27 June	Mark Lamsfuß (Germany); Isabel Lohau (Germany)	1–2	(United Kingdom) Marcus Ellis (United Kingdom) Lauren Smith	21–16	17–21	10–21
27 June	Miha Ivančič (Slovenia); Petra Polanc (Slovenia)	0–2	(Austria) Philip Birker (Austria) Katharina Hochmeir	8–21	17–21	
29 June	Marcus Ellis (United Kingdom); Lauren Smith (United Kingdom)	2–0	(Austria) Philip Birker (Austria) Katharina Hochmeir	21–10	21–9	
29 June	Mark Lamsfuß (Germany); Isabel Lohau (Germany)	2–0	(Slovenia) Miha Ivančič (Slovenia) Petra Polanc	21–13	21–15	

== Knockout stage ==
The 8 surviving pairs will be drawn in a single elimination tournament, with group winners paired in the quarter final with runners up from other groups. There will be no bronze medal match, and both losing semi-finalists will win a bronze medal.

Quarter-finals
1	Thom Gicquel (FRA); Delphine Delrue (FRA)	21	21
Mihajlo Tomić (SRB); Andjela Vitman (SRB)	14	14
Marcus Ellis (GBR); Lauren Smith (GBR)	21	21
Paweł Śmiłowski (POL); Magdalena Świerczyńska (POL)	8	16
4	Mark Lamsfuß (GER); Isabel Lohau (GER)	14	13
3	Mathias Christiansen (DEN); Alexandra Bøje (DEN)	21	21
Joshua Magee (IRL); Moya Ryan (IRL)	8	6
2	Robin Tabeling (NED); Selena Piek (NED)	21	21

Semi-finals
1	Thom Gicquel (FRA); Delphine Delrue (FRA)	21	14	21
Marcus Ellis (GBR); Lauren Smith (GBR)	18	21	18
3	Mathias Christiansen (DEN); Alexandra Bøje (DEN)	14	13
2	Robin Tabeling (NED); Selena Piek (NED)	21	21

Gold medal match
1	Thom Gicquel (FRA); Delphine Delrue (FRA)	10	21	13
2	Robin Tabeling (NED); Selena Piek (NED)	21	13	21
