= Badminton at the 2023 European Games =

- Venue: Arena Jaskółka, Tarnów
- Dates: 26 June – 2 July
- Competitors: 143 from 37 nations

Badminton at the 2023 European Games was held at Arena Jaskółka, Tarnów, Poland from 26 June to 2 July. The badminton programme in 2023 included men's and women's singles competitions; men's, women's and mixed doubles competitions. The event was functioned as the 2023 European Badminton Championships.

== Qualification ==
Qualification was decided entirely by European rankings, using the BWF World Ranking system with non-European players removed. NOCs could enter up to two entries per event, provided that both entrants were in the top 8 individuals, or top 4 doubles pairs in the relevant European list - Denmark (twice), France and Great Britain were able to avail of this rule. Otherwise NOCs are restricted to one entry per event. In addition to France, Denmark and Great Britain, a further six NOCs achieved a single entry in every event, including the host, Poland.

NOC	Men		Women		Mixed	Total	
NOC	Singles	Doubles	Singles	Doubles	Doubles	Quotas	Athletes
Austria	1		1	1	1	4	5
Azerbaijan	1	1	1	1		4	4
Belgium	1		1			2	2
Bulgaria	1	1	1	1	1	5	6
Croatia	1					1	1
Cyprus			1			1	1
Czech Republic	1	1	1			3	4
Denmark	2	1	2	1	1	7	10
Estonia	1		1	1		3	4
Finland	1		1			2	2
France	2	1	1	1	1	6	7
Germany	1	1	1	1	1	5	6
Great Britain	1	2	1	1	1	6	10
Greece			1			1	1
Hungary	1		1			2	2
Iceland		1				1	2
Ireland	1	1	1	1	1	5	6
Israel	1		1		1	3	3
Italy	1	1	1	1	1	5	7
Latvia			1			1	1
Lithuania			1			1	1
Luxembourg	1		1			2	2
Malta	1					1	1
Moldova			1			1	1
Netherlands	1	1	1	1	1	5	8
Norway	1	1		1	1	4	6
Poland	1	1	1	1	1	5	8
Portugal	1					1	1
Romania	1					1	1
Serbia			1		1	2	3
Slovakia	1		1		1	3	2
Slovenia	1		1		1	3	3
Spain	1		1	1		3	4
Sweden	1	1	1	1		4	6
Switzerland	1		1		1	3	4
Turkey	1		1			2	2
Ukraine	1	1	1	1		4	6
37 NOCs	32	16	32	16	16	112	143

== Competition schedule ==
GS	Group stage	R16	Round of 16	¼	Quarterfinals	½	Semifinals	F	Final

Events	Mon 26	Tue 27	Wed 28	Thu 29	Fri 30	Sat 1	Sun 2
Men's singles	GS	GS	GS	R16	¼	½	F
Men's doubles	GS	GS	GS	¼	½	F	
Women's singles	GS	GS	GS	R16	¼	½	F
Women's doubles	GS	GS	GS	¼	½	F	
Mixed doubles	GS	GS		GS	¼	½	F

== Medalists ==
=== Medal table ===
* Host nation (Poland)

Rank	NOC	Gold	Silver	Bronze	Total
1	Denmark (DEN)	2	1	1	4
2	Netherlands (NED)	1	1	0	2
3	Bulgaria (BUL)	1	0	0	1
3	Spain (ESP)	1	0	0	1
5	France (FRA)	0	2	3	5
6	Great Britain (GBR)	0	1	3	4
7	Germany (GER)	0	0	1	1
7	Israel (ISR)	0	0	1	1
7	Switzerland (SUI)	0	0	1	1
Totals (9 entries)		5	5	10	20

=== Medalists ===
Event	Gold	Silver	Bronze
Men's singles	Viktor Axelsen; Denmark	Christo Popov; France	Toma Junior Popov; France
Men's singles	Viktor Axelsen; Denmark	Christo Popov; France	Misha Zilberman; Israel
Women's singles	Carolina Marín; Spain	Mia Blichfeldt; Denmark	Kirsty Gilmour; Great Britain
Women's singles	Carolina Marín; Spain	Mia Blichfeldt; Denmark	Jenjira Stadelmann; Switzerland
Men's doubles	Denmark; Kim Astrup; Anders Skaarup Rasmussen	Great Britain; Ben Lane; Sean Vendy	Great Britain; Alexander Dunn; Adam Hall
Men's doubles	Denmark; Kim Astrup; Anders Skaarup Rasmussen	Great Britain; Ben Lane; Sean Vendy	France; Christo Popov; Toma Junior Popov
Women's doubles	Bulgaria; Gabriela Stoeva; Stefani Stoeva	Netherlands; Debora Jille; Cheryl Seinen	France; Margot Lambert; Anne Tran
Women's doubles	Bulgaria; Gabriela Stoeva; Stefani Stoeva	Netherlands; Debora Jille; Cheryl Seinen	Germany; Linda Efler; Isabel Lohau
Mixed doubles	Netherlands; Robin Tabeling; Selena Piek	France; Thom Gicquel; Delphine Delrue	Great Britain; Marcus Ellis; Lauren Smith
Mixed doubles	Netherlands; Robin Tabeling; Selena Piek	France; Thom Gicquel; Delphine Delrue	Denmark; Mathias Christiansen; Alexandra Bøje
