= Debora Jille =

Dutch badminton player (born 1999)

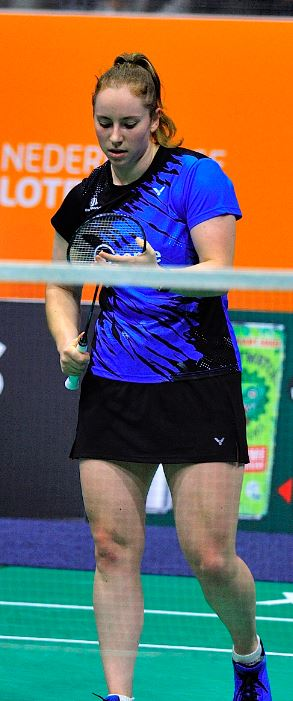

Personal information
- Born: 11 September 1999 (age 27) Nieuwegein, Netherlands
- Height: 1.75 m (5 ft 9 in)

Sport
- Country: Netherlands
- Sport: Badminton
- Handedness: Right

Women's & mixed doubles
- Highest ranking: 23 (WD with Cheryl Seinen, 3 January 2023); 61 (XD with Ties van der Lecq, 20 December 2022)
- Current ranking: 57 (XD with Brian Wassink, 19 May 2026)
- BWF profile
Medal record
Women's badminton
Representing Netherlands
European Games
Silver medal – second place	2023 Kraków–Małopolska	Women's doubles
European Championships
Bronze medal – third place	2024 Saarbrücken	Women's doubles
Bronze medal – third place	2025 Horsens	Women's doubles
European Mixed Team Championships
Bronze medal – third place	2019 Copenhagen	Mixed team

Debora Jille (born 11 September 1999) is a Dutch badminton player. Partnered with Cheryl Seinen, she won the silver medal at the 2023 European Games and bronze at 2024 European Championships. She also won the bronze medal at the 2025 European Championships with Sara Thygesen. Jille is a member of the BWF Athletes' Commission serving from 2025 to 2029.

== Career ==
Debora Jille started playing badminton when she was almost seven years old. Just like her brothers Stefan and Ruben they first started playing tennis before picking up the sport of their mother, badminton in Houten and in Amersfoort. She won the women's doubles title twice at the Dutch National Badminton Championships in 2022 and 2023 together with partner Cheryl Seinen; and also won the mixed doubles title in 2022 with Ties van der Lecq. In the Dutch Eredivisie league, she is playing for BC Duinwijck. In the German Bundesliga league, she played for TV Refrath, while in Denmark in the Elite league her club is Vendsyssel Badminton Club.

== Achievements ==
=== European Games ===
Women's doubles
Year	Venue	Partner	Opponent	Score	Result	Ref.
2023	Arena Jaskółka; Tarnów, Poland	(Netherlands) Cheryl Seinen	(Bulgaria) Gabriela Stoeva (Bulgaria) Stefani Stoeva	7–21, 17–21	Silver	

=== European Championships ===
Women's doubles
Year	Venue	Partner	Opponent	Score	Result	Ref.
2024	Saarlandhalle; Saarbrücken, Germany	(Netherlands) Cheryl Seinen	(France) Margot Lambert (France) Anne Tran	15–21, 12–21	Bronze	
2025	Forum; Horsens, Denmark	(Denmark) Sara Thygesen	(Bulgaria) Gabriela Stoeva (Bulgaria) Stefani Stoeva	14–21, 10–21	Bronze	

=== BWF International Challenge/Series (8 titles, 7 runners-up) ===
Women's doubles
Year	Tournament	Partner	Opponent	Score	Result
2017	Dutch International	(Netherlands) Imke van der Aar	(Germany) Cisita Joity Jansen (Germany) Birgit Overzier	18–21, 18–21	(silver) Runner-up
2017	Belgian International	(Netherlands) Imke van der Aar	(Netherlands) Selena Piek (Netherlands) Cheryl Seinen	14–21, 16–21	(silver) Runner-up
2018	Swedish Open	(Netherlands) Imke van der Aar	(Sweden) Emma Karlsson (Sweden) Johanna Magnusson	21–18, 11–21, 19–21	(silver) Runner-up
2019	Dutch International	(Netherlands) Alyssa Tirtosentono	(Denmark) Amalie Magelund (Denmark) Freja Ravn	24–22, 19–21, 11–21	(silver) Runner-up
2019	Croatian International	(Netherlands) Alyssa Tirtosentono	(Ukraine) Hrystyna Dzhangobekova (Slovakia) Katarina Vargová	21–13, 21–9	(gold) Winner
2019	Lithuanian International	(Netherlands) Alyssa Tirtosentono	(Denmark) Christine Busch (Denmark) Amalie Schulz	21–18, 21–10	(gold) Winner
2021	Dutch Open	(Netherlands) Cheryl Seinen	(Sweden) Johanna Magnusson (Sweden) Clara Nistad	21–17, 14–21, 12–21	(silver) Runner-up
2021	Irish Open	(Netherlands) Cheryl Seinen	(Australia) Chen Hsuan-yu (Australia) Gronya Somerville	15–21, 21–14, 21–14	(gold) Winner
2022	Dutch Open	(Netherlands) Cheryl Seinen	(England) Chloe Birch (England) Lauren Smith	5–10 retired	(gold) Winner
2023	Dutch Open	(Netherlands) Cheryl Seinen	(Denmark) Julie Finne-Ipsen (Denmark) Mai Surrow	21–9, 21–13	(gold) Winner
2024	Scottish Open	(Denmark) Sara Thygesen	(England) Chloe Birch (England) Estelle van Leeuwen	21–14, 10–21, 21–8	(gold) Winner
2026	Slovenia Open	(Netherlands) Meerte Loos	(India) Aditi Bhatt (India) Shravani Walekar	21–19, 21–14	(gold) Winner
2026	Italian Open	(Netherlands) Kirsten de Wit	(England) Lisa Curtin (England) Yulia Tang	19–21, 20–22	(silver) Runner-up
2026	Dutch Open	(Netherlands) Kirsten de Wit	(Germany) Stine Küspert (Germany) Isabel Lohau	17–21, 17–21	(silver) Runner-up

Mixed doubles
Year	Tournament	Partner	Opponent	Score	Result
2019	Lithuanian International	(Netherlands) Ties van der Lecq	(Russia) Georgii Karpov (Russia) Viktoriia Kozyreva	21–14, 23–21	(gold) Winner

BWF International Challenge tournament
BWF International Series tournament
BWF Future Series tournament
