= Stefani Stoeva =

Bulgarian badminton player (born 1995)

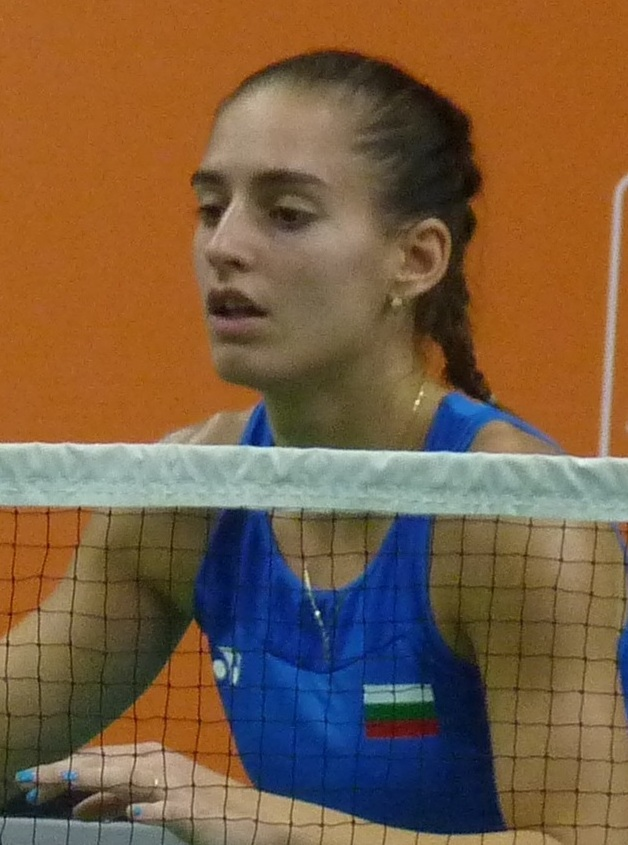
- Stoeva at the 2018 Dutch Open

Personal information
- Born: 23 September 1995 (age 31) Galabovo, Bulgaria
- Years active: 2009–present
- Height: 1.73 m (5 ft 8 in)

Sport
- Country: Bulgaria
- Sport: Badminton
- Handedness: Right

Women's singles & doubles
- Highest ranking: 40 (WS, 14 June 2014); 8 (WD with Gabriela Stoeva, 8 November 2018)
- Current ranking: 9 (WD with Gabriela Stoeva, 3 November 2026)
- BWF profile
Medal record
Women's badminton
Representing Bulgaria
European Games
| Gold medal – first place | 2015 Baku | Women's doubles |
| Gold medal – first place | 2023 Kraków–Małopolska | Women's doubles |
European Championships
| Gold medal – first place | 2018 Huelva | Women's doubles |
| Gold medal – first place | 2021 Kyiv | Women's doubles |
| Gold medal – first place | 2022 Madrid | Women's doubles |
| Gold medal – first place | 2025 Horsens | Women's doubles |
| Gold medal – first place | 2026 Huelva | Women's doubles |
| Silver medal – second place | 2017 Kolding | Women's doubles |
| Silver medal – second place | 2024 Saarbrücken | Women's doubles |
European Women's Team Championships
| Gold medal – first place | 2026 Istanbul | Women's team |
| Silver medal – second place | 2016 Kazan | Women's team |
| Bronze medal – third place | 2014 Basel | Women's team |
European Junior Championships
| Gold medal – first place | 2013 Ankara | Girls' singles |
| Gold medal – first place | 2013 Ankara | Girls' doubles |

Stefani Stoeva (Bulgarian: Стефани Стоева; born 23 September 1995) is a Bulgarian badminton player specializing in doubles. Her current partner is her older sister, Gabriela Stoeva. They competed at the 2016, 2020 and the 2024 Summer Olympics. The duo together have won gold medals in the 2015 and 2023 European Games and also four successive European Championships in 2018, 2021, 2022 and 2025 editions. Stefani Stoeva has also won some individual titles in women's singles competition.

== Career ==
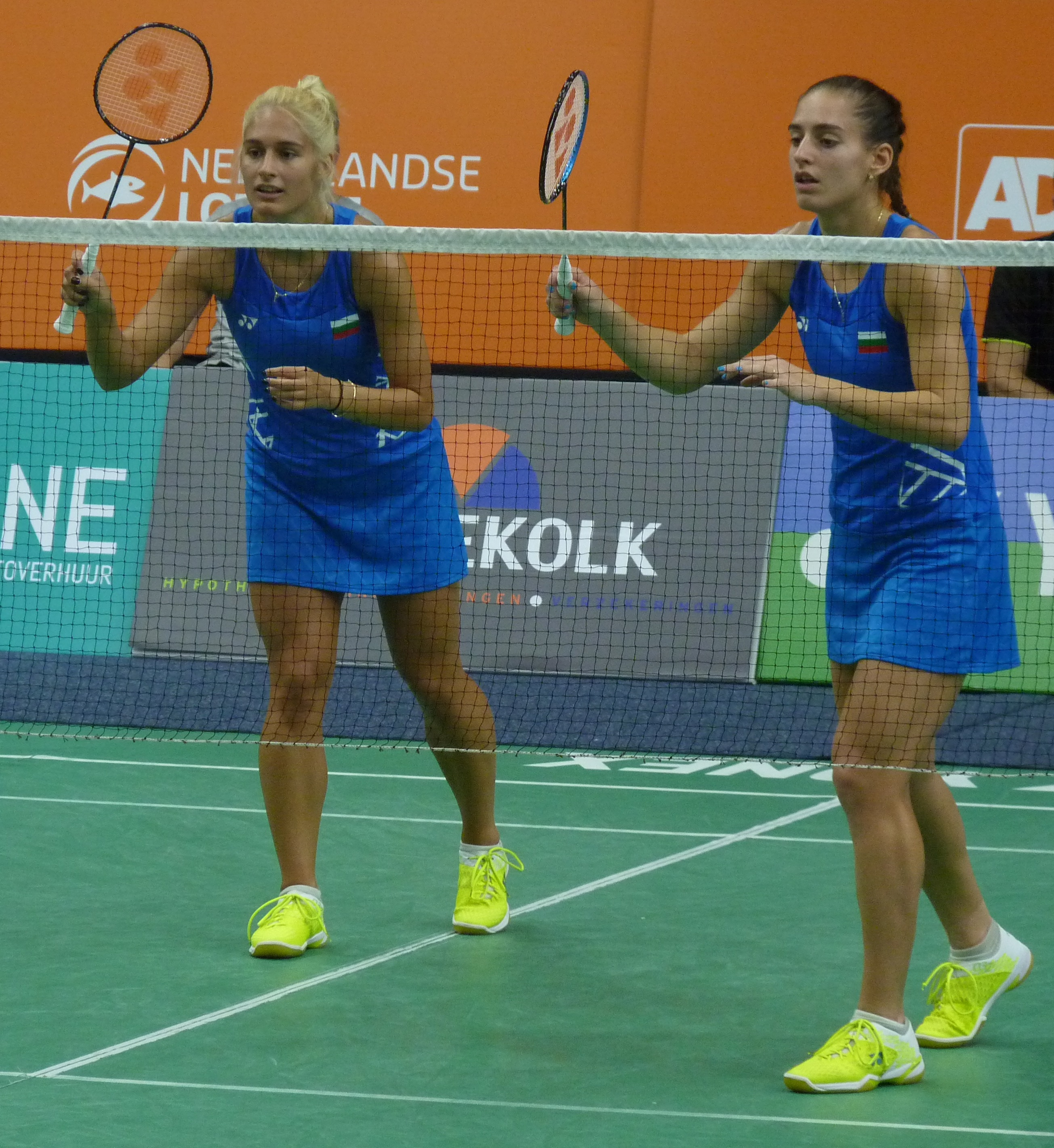
Stefani playing with her sister, Gabriela

Stoeva started playing badminton at age 9 at the Haskovo School Club in 2007. She won gold medals at the U17 European Championships in the girls' singles and doubles. At the 2014 Scottish Open Grand Prix, she won in the women's doubles event, partnered with Gabriela Stoeva. They beat Heather Olver and Lauren Smith of England in the finals round with the score 21–7, 21–15.

In 2015, she won the Dutch Open in women's doubles against the top seeds, World No.7 Eefje Muskens and Selena Piek of Nederlands with the score 24–22, 21–15 in the final. She won the Russian Open against Johanna Goliszewski and Carla Nelte of German 21–15, 21–17. She competed in the European Games, and won gold in the women's doubles alongside her sister.

In 2016, Stoeva competed at the Rio 2016 Summer Olympics, but did not advance to the knocked-out stage after placing third in the group D stage.

In 2017, she became the women's doubles runner-up at the Swiss Open Grand Prix Gold. They lost to China pair Chen Qingchen and Jia Yifan with the score 16–21, 15–21. The sisters also won the silver medal at the European Championships.

=== 2020–2021: Second European Championships title ===
Stefani and her partner Gabriela were lost in the initial rounds in two opening tournaments in 2020. They lost in the first round to Chang Ye-na and Kim Hye-rin at the Indonesia Masters, and to world number 1 Chen Qingchen and Jia Yifan in the Thailand Masters. The Stoeva then reached the final in the Spain Masters, losing the final to Greysia Polii and Apriyani Rahayu in a close rubber games. Due to the COVID-19 pandemic, numerous tournaments on the 2020 BWF World Tour were either cancelled or rescheduled for later in the year, they then felt the atmosphere of a tournament in Sofia in October, at the Bulgarian International, where she and her partner emerged victory at that tournament. The duo then ended the season by winning the Super 100 event at the SaarLorLux Open.

The Stoevas opened the 2021 season as the finalists in the Swiss Open, losing the title to the rising Malaysian pair Pearly Tan and Thinaah Muralitharan. They then finished runner-up in the Orléans Masters this time losing to Jongkolphan Kititharakul and Rawinda Prajongjai of Thailand. The duo then clinched their first title of the year by winning their second European Championships title in Kyiv, Ukraine. The duo competed at the 2020 Tokyo Olympics but were eliminated in the group stage.

=== 2022: 3rd European Championships title ===
Stefani and her partner Gabriela opened the 2022 season with quite satisfactory results, by becoming finalists in the German Open. They then won 3 consecutive tournaments, in the Swiss Open, Orléans Masters and in their third European Championships.

Stefani and Gabriela ended the year on poor form, exiting four of their final six tournaments in the first round. Her sister, Gabriela, stated that their partnerships were lost communication on court, only arguing, and the energy around them was pretty negative.

=== 2023: Second European Games gold ===
In the first semester of 2023, Stoeva has not been able to win any single titles, as her best results with Gabriela was being quarter-finalists in the Malaysia, India and the German Opens. Stefani and Gabriela claimed their first title of the year by winning the gold medal at the European Games, beating Dutch pair Debora Jille and Cheryl Seinen in the finals. They also competed in the BWF World Championships, but had to be knocked out in the early rounds by Yeung Nga Ting and Yeung Pui Lam of Hong Kong. In the remaining tournaments in 2023, they were able to win the International Challenge titles in Scotland, Bahrain and Wales, as well as finished runner-up in the Irish Open.

=== 2024 ===
Stoeva won her first international title in 2024 at the Azerbaijan International. She and her partner reached the finals in the German Open, but lost to Chinese pair Li Yijing and Luo Xumin. As the defending champion at the European Championships, Stoeva unable to defend their title after lost to French pair Margot Lambert and Anne Tran in the final.

== Achievements ==
=== European Games ===
Women's doubles
| Year | Venue | Partner | Opponent | Score | Result |
|---|---|---|---|---|---|
| 2015 | Baku Sports Hall, Baku, Azerbaijan | (Bulgaria) Gabriela Stoeva | (Russia) Ekaterina Bolotova (Russia) Evgeniya Kosetskaya | 21–12, 23–21 | Gold |
| 2023 | Arena Jaskółka, Tarnów, Poland | (Bulgaria) Gabriela Stoeva | (Netherlands) Debora Jille (Netherlands) Cheryl Seinen | 21–7, 21–17 | Gold |

=== European Championships ===
Women's doubles
| Year | Venue | Partner | Opponent | Score | Result |
|---|---|---|---|---|---|
| 2017 | Sydbank Arena, Kolding, Denmark | (Bulgaria) Gabriela Stoeva | (Denmark) Christinna Pedersen (Denmark) Kamilla Rytter Juhl | 11–21, 21–15, 11–21 | Silver |
| 2018 | Palacio de los Deportes Carolina Marín, Huelva, Spain | (Bulgaria) Gabriela Stoeva | (France) Émilie Lefel (France) Anne Tran | 21–12, 21–10 | Gold |
| 2021 | Palace of Sports, Kyiv, Ukraine | (Bulgaria) Gabriela Stoeva | (England) Chloe Birch (England) Lauren Smith | 21–14, 21–19 | Gold |
| 2022 | Polideportivo Municipal Gallur, Madrid, Spain | (Bulgaria) Gabriela Stoeva | (Germany) Linda Efler (Germany) Isabel Lohau | 21–14, 21–10 | Gold |
| 2024 | Saarlandhalle, Saarbrücken, Germany | (Bulgaria) Gabriela Stoeva | (France) Margot Lambert (France) Anne Tran | 21–16, 17–21, 11–21 | Silver |
| 2025 | Forum, Horsens, Denmark | (Bulgaria) Gabriela Stoeva | (Denmark) Natasja Anthonisen (Denmark) Maiken Fruergaard | 21–11, 21–16 | Gold |
| 2026 | Palacio de los Deportes Carolina Marín, Huelva, Spain | (Bulgaria) Gabriela Stoeva | (Turkey) Bengisu Erçetin (Turkey) Nazlıcan İnci | 21–11, 21–17 | Gold |

=== European Junior Championships ===
Girls' singles
| Year | Venue | Opponent | Score | Result |
|---|---|---|---|---|
| 2013 | ASKI Sport Hall, Ankara, Turkey | (Denmark) Line Kjærsfeldt | 21–13, 23–25, 21–19 | Gold |

Girls' doubles
| Year | Venue | Partner | Opponent | Score | Result |
|---|---|---|---|---|---|
| 2013 | ASKI Sport Hall, Ankara, Turkey | (Bulgaria) Gabriela Stoeva | (Denmark) Julie Finne-Ipsen (Denmark) Rikke Søby Hansen | 21–11, 21–18 | Gold |

=== BWF World Tour (10 titles, 8 runners-up) ===
The BWF World Tour, which was announced on 19 March 2017 and implemented in 2018, is a series of elite badminton tournaments sanctioned by the Badminton World Federation (BWF). The BWF World Tour is divided into levels of World Tour Finals, Super 1000, Super 750, Super 500, Super 300 (part of the HSBC World Tour), and the BWF Tour Super 100.

Women's doubles

| Year | Tournament | Partner | Level | Opponent | Score | Result |
|---|---|---|---|---|---|---|
| 2018 | Swiss Open | Super 300 | (Bulgaria) Gabriela Stoeva | (Japan) Ayako Sakuramoto (Japan) Yukiko Takahata | 21–19, 15–21, 18–21 | (silver) Runner-up |
| 2018 | Orléans Masters | Super 100 | (Bulgaria) Gabriela Stoeva | (France) Delphine Delrue (France) Léa Palermo | 21–8, 21–14 | (gold) Winner |
| 2018 | Dutch Open | Super 100 | (Bulgaria) Gabriela Stoeva | (Netherlands) Selena Piek (Netherlands) Cheryl Seinen | 21–17, 21–18 | (gold) Winner |
| 2018 | French Open | Super 750 | (Bulgaria) Gabriela Stoeva | (Japan) Mayu Matsumoto (Japan) Wakana Nagahara | 14–21, 19–21 | (silver) Runner-up |
| 2018 | SaarLorLux Open | Super 100 | (Bulgaria) Gabriela Stoeva | (Indonesia) Ni Ketut Mahadewi Istarani (Indonesia) Rizki Amelia Pradipta | 22–20, 15–21, 21–19 | (gold) Winner |
| 2018 | Scottish Open | Super 100 | (Bulgaria) Gabriela Stoeva | (France) Émilie Lefel (France) Anne Tran | 21–16, 21–9 | (gold) Winner |
| 2019 | Dutch Open | Super 100 | (Bulgaria) Gabriela Stoeva | (Japan) Rin Iwanaga (Japan) Kie Nakanishi | 21–10, 22–20 | (gold) Winner |
| 2020 | Spain Masters | Super 300 | (Bulgaria) Gabriela Stoeva | (Indonesia) Greysia Polii (Indonesia) Apriyani Rahayu | 21–18, 20–22, 17–21 | (silver) Runner-up |
| 2020 | SaarLorLux Open | Super 100 | (Bulgaria) Gabriela Stoeva | (Denmark) Amalie Magelund (Denmark) Freja Ravn | 21–8, 21–11 | (gold) Winner |
| 2021 | Swiss Open | Super 300 | (Bulgaria) Gabriela Stoeva | (Malaysia) Pearly Tan (Malaysia) Thinaah Muralitharan | 19–21, 12–21 | (silver) Runner-up |
| 2021 | Orléans Masters | Super 100 | (Bulgaria) Gabriela Stoeva | (Thailand) Jongkolphan Kititharakul (Thailand) Rawinda Prajongjai | 16–21, 16–21 | (silver) Runner-up |
| 2022 | German Open | Super 300 | (Bulgaria) Gabriela Stoeva | (China) Chen Qingchen (China) Jia Yifan | 16–21, 30–29, 19–21 | (silver) Runner-up |
| 2022 | Swiss Open | Super 300 | (Bulgaria) Gabriela Stoeva | (Germany) Linda Efler (Germany) Isabel Lohau | 21–14, 21–12 | (gold) Winner |
| 2022 | Orléans Masters | Super 100 | (Bulgaria) Gabriela Stoeva | (Germany) Stine Küspert (Germany) Emma Moszczyński | 21–15, 21–14 | (gold) Winner |
| 2024 | German Open | Super 300 | (Bulgaria) Gabriela Stoeva | (China) Li Yijing (China) Luo Xumin | 7–21, 21–13, 18–21 | (silver) Runner-up |
| 2025 | German Open | Super 300 | (Bulgaria) Gabriela Stoeva | (Japan) Miyu Takahashi (Japan) Mizuki Otake | 17–21, 22–20, 12–21 | (silver) Runner-up |
| 2025 | Al Ain Masters | Super 100 | (Bulgaria) Gabriela Stoeva | (Chinese Taipei) Chen Yan-fei (Chinese Taipei) Sun Liang-ching | 21–8, 21–13 | (gold) Winner |
| 2025 | Odisha Masters | Super 100 | (Bulgaria) Gabriela Stoeva | (Malaysia) Ong Xin Yee (Malaysia) Carmen Ting | 21–19, 21–14 | (gold) Winner |

=== BWF Grand Prix (3 titles, 3 runners-up) ===
The BWF Grand Prix had two levels, the Grand Prix and Grand Prix Gold. It was a series of badminton tournaments sanctioned by the Badminton World Federation (BWF) and played between 2007 and 2017.

Women's doubles
| Year | Tournament | Partner | Opponent | Score | Result |
|---|---|---|---|---|---|
| 2014 | Brasil Open | (Bulgaria) Gabriela Stoeva | (Germany) Johanna Goliszewski (Germany) Carla Nelte | 5–11, 7–11, 11–4, 10–11 | (silver) Runner-up |
| 2014 | Scottish Open | (Bulgaria) Gabriela Stoeva | (England) Heather Olver (England) Lauren Smith | 21–7, 21–15 | (gold) Winner |
| 2015 | Russian Open | (Bulgaria) Gabriela Stoeva | (Germany) Johanna Goliszewski (Germany) Carla Nelte | 21–15, 21–17 | (gold) Winner |
| 2015 | Dutch Open | (Bulgaria) Gabriela Stoeva | (Netherlands) Eefje Muskens (Netherlands) Selena Piek | 24–22, 21–15 | (gold) Winner |
| 2016 | Dutch Open | (Bulgaria) Gabriela Stoeva | (Australia) Setyana Mapasa (Australia) Gronya Somerville | 21–17, 17–21, 16–21 | (silver) Runner-up |
| 2017 | Swiss Open | (Bulgaria) Gabriela Stoeva | (China) Chen Qingchen (China) Jia Yifan | 16–21, 15–21 | (silver) Runner-up |

BWF Grand Prix Gold tournament
BWF Grand Prix tournament

=== BWF International Challenge/Series (41 titles, 11 runners-up) ===
Women's singles
| Year | Tournament | Opponent | Score | Result |
|---|---|---|---|---|
| 2011 | Hungarian International | (Denmark) Camilla Sørensen | 23–21 21–14 | (gold) Winner |
| 2012 | Bulgarian Hebar Open | (Belarus) Alesia Zaitsava | 17–21, 21–18, 10–21 | (silver) Runner-up |
| 2012 | Bulgarian International | (Bulgaria) Petya Nedelcheva | 9–21, 18–21 | (silver) Runner-up |
| 2013 | Indonesia International | (Indonesia) Dinar Dyah Ayustine | 21–13, 15–21, 12–21 | (silver) Runner-up |
| 2013 | Bulgarian Eurasia Open | (Bulgaria) Linda Zetchiri | 21–16, 21–18 | (gold) Winner |
| 2013 | Turkey International | (Turkey) Neslihan Yiğit | 14–21, 21–16, 21–19 | (gold) Winner |
| 2014 | Slovenian International | (Netherlands) Soraya de Visch Eijbergen | 21–18, 21–14 | (gold) Winner |
| 2014 | White Nights | (Bulgaria) Petya Nedelcheva | 14–21, 17–21 | (silver) Runner-up |
| 2024 | Bulgarian International | (Bulgaria) Gergana Pavlova | 18–21, 21–15, 21–8 | (gold) Winner |
| 2024 | Egypt International | (Italy) Yasmine Hamza | 21–10, 22–20 | (gold) Winner |
| 2025 | Italian Open | (Turkey) Özge Bayrak | 15–21, 19–21 | (silver) Runner-up |

Women's doubles
| Year | Tournament | Partner | Opponent | Score | Result |
|---|---|---|---|---|---|
| 2011 | Turkiye Open | (Bulgaria) Gabriela Stoeva | (England) Alexandra Langley (England) Lauren Smith | 21–14, 16–21, 21–10 | (gold) Winner |
| 2012 | Banuinvest International | (Bulgaria) Gabriela Stoeva | (Denmark) Sandra-Maria Jensen (Denmark) Line Kjærsfeldt | 19–21, 21–17, 16–21 | (silver) Runner-up |
| 2012 | Bulgarian Hebar Open | (Bulgaria) Gabriela Stoeva | (Bulgaria) Rumiana Ivanova (Bulgaria) Dimitria Popstoikova | 15–21, 21–14, 21–11 | (gold) Winner |
| 2012 | Bulgarian International | (Bulgaria) Gabriela Stoeva | (Turkey) Özge Bayrak (Turkey) Neslihan Yiğit | 21–9, 21–17 | (gold) Winner |
| 2012 | Turkey International | (Bulgaria) Gabriela Stoeva | (Turkey) Özge Bayrak (Turkey) Neslihan Yiğit | 19–21, 21–14, 23–21 | (gold) Winner |
| 2013 | Bulgarian Eurasia Open | (Bulgaria) Gabriela Stoeva | (Bulgaria) Petya Nedelcheva (Bulgaria) Dimitria Popstoikova | 11–21, 8–21 | (silver) Runner-up |
| 2013 | Belgian International | (Bulgaria) Gabriela Stoeva | (Scotland) Imogen Bankier (Bulgaria) Petya Nedelcheva | 21–13, 11–21, 18–21 | (silver) Runner-up |
| 2013 | Bulgarian International | (Bulgaria) Gabriela Stoeva | (United States) Eva Lee (United States) Paula Lynn Obañana | 21–15, 21–10 | (gold) Winner |
| 2013 | Turkey International | (Bulgaria) Gabriela Stoeva | (Turkey) Özge Bayrak (Turkey) Neslihan Yiğit | 21–15, 21–8 | (gold) Winner |
| 2014 | Austrian International | (Bulgaria) Gabriela Stoeva | (Russia) Olga Golovanova (Russia) Viktoriia Vorobeva | 21–17, 20–22, 21–15 | (gold) Winner |
| 2014 | Orléans International | (Bulgaria) Gabriela Stoeva | (Scotland) Imogen Bankier (Bulgaria) Petya Nedelcheva | 14–21, 7–21 | (silver) Runner-up |
| 2014 | Finnish Open | (Bulgaria) Gabriela Stoeva | (Denmark) Line Damkjær Kruse (Denmark) Marie Røpke | 17–21, 14–21 | (silver) Runner-up |
| 2014 | Slovenian International | (Bulgaria) Gabriela Stoeva | (Russia) Victoria Dergunova (Russia) Olga Morozova | 21–16, 21–17 | (gold) Winner |
| 2014 | Spanish Open | (Bulgaria) Gabriela Stoeva | (Scotland) Imogen Bankier (Scotland) Kirsty Gilmour | 21–14, 21–9 | (gold) Winner |
| 2014 | Swiss International | (Bulgaria) Gabriela Stoeva | (Indonesia) Meiliana Jauhari (Indonesia) Aprilsasi Putri Lejarsar Variella | 11–6, 11–5, 11–9 | (gold) Winner |
| 2014 | Turkey International | (Bulgaria) Gabriela Stoeva | (Turkey) Özge Bayrak (Turkey) Neslihan Yiğit | 21–11, 21–9 | (gold) Winner |
| 2015 | Orléans International | (Bulgaria) Gabriela Stoeva | (England) Heather Olver (England) Lauren Smith | 22–20, 16–21, 21–9 | (gold) Winner |
| 2015 | Spanish International | (Bulgaria) Gabriela Stoeva | (Russia) Anastasia Chervyakova (Russia) Olga Morozova | 21–16, 21–11 | (gold) Winner |
| 2015 | Bulgarian International | (Bulgaria) Gabriela Stoeva | (United States) Eva Lee (United States) Paula Lynn Obañana | 21–14, 21–10 | (gold) Winner |
| 2015 | Welsh International | (Bulgaria) Gabriela Stoeva | (England) Heather Olver (England) Lauren Smith | 21–10, 22–20 | (gold) Winner |
| 2015 | Irish Open | (Bulgaria) Gabriela Stoeva | (Denmark) Julie Finne-Ipsen (Denmark) Rikke Søby Hansen | 21–10, 22–24, 21–9 | (gold) Winner |
| 2015 | Italian International | (Bulgaria) Gabriela Stoeva | (Australia) Setyana Mapasa (Australia) Gronya Somerville | 21–19, 18–21, 13–6 retired | (gold) Winner |
| 2015 | Turkey International | (Bulgaria) Gabriela Stoeva | (Turkey) Özge Bayrak (Turkey) Neslihan Yiğit | 21–19, 21–12 | (gold) Winner |
| 2017 | Bulgarian Open | (Bulgaria) Gabriela Stoeva | (Turkey) Bengisu Erçetin (Turkey) Nazlıcan İnci | 21–16, 21–12 | (gold) Winner |
| 2018 | Bulgarian Open | (Bulgaria) Gabriela Stoeva | (Denmark) Amalie Magelund (Denmark) Freja Ravn | 21–16, 21–19 | (gold) Winner |
| 2019 | Spanish International | (Bulgaria) Gabriela Stoeva | (France) Émilie Lefel (France) Anne Tran | 21–8, 21–10 | (gold) Winner |
| 2019 | Belgian International | (Bulgaria) Gabriela Stoeva | (Canada) Rachel Honderich (Canada) Kristen Tsai | 21–16, 21–15 | (gold) Winner |
| 2019 | Italian International | (Bulgaria) Gabriela Stoeva | (Russia) Ekaterina Bolotova (Russia) Alina Davletova | 21–11, 21–14 | (gold) Winner |
| 2020 | Bulgarian International | (Bulgaria) Gabriela Stoeva | (Bulgaria) Maria Delcheva (Bulgaria) Hristomira Popovska | 21–8, 21–9 | (gold) Winner |
| 2023 | Scottish Open | (Bulgaria) Gabriela Stoeva | (Japan) Maiko Kawazoe (Japan) Haruna Konishi | 19–21, 21–11, 21–12 | (gold) Winner |
| 2023 | Irish Open | (Bulgaria) Gabriela Stoeva | (Denmark) Maiken Fruergaard (Denmark) Sara Thygesen | 19–21, 21–17, 22–24 | (silver) Runner-up |
| 2023 | Bahrain International | (Bulgaria) Gabriela Stoeva | (Japan) Kokona Ishikawa (Japan) Mio Konegawa | 21–19, 21–14 | (gold) Winner |
| 2023 | Welsh International | (Bulgaria) Gabriela Stoeva | (Denmark) Natasja Anthonisen (Netherlands) Alyssa Tirtosentono | 24–22, 21–11 | (gold) Winner |
| 2024 | Azerbaijan International | (Bulgaria) Gabriela Stoeva | (Canada) Catherine Choi (Canada) Josephine Wu | 21–14, 21–7 | (gold) Winner |
| 2024 | Bulgarian International | (Bulgaria) Gabriela Stoeva | (Bulgaria) Tanya Ivanova (Bulgaria) Gergana Pavlova | 21–5, 21–10 | (gold) Winner |
| 2024 | Dutch Open | (Bulgaria) Gabriela Stoeva | (England) Chloe Birch (England) Estelle van Leeuwen | 21–15, 21–18 | (gold) Winner |
| 2024 (II) | Bahrain International | (Bulgaria) Gabriela Stoeva | (United Arab Emirates) Mysha Omer Khan (United Arab Emirates) Taabia Khan | 21–6, 21–8 | (gold) Winner |
| 2025 | Iran Fajr International | (Bulgaria) Gabriela Stoeva | (Turkey) Bengisu Erçetin (Turkey) Nazlıcan İnci | 23–21, 21–16 | (gold) Winner |
| 2025 | Italian Open | (Bulgaria) Gabriela Stoeva | (Turkey) Bengisu Erçetin (Turkey) Nazlıcan İnci | 21–19, 21–14 | (gold) Winner |
| 2025 | Belgian International | (Bulgaria) Gabriela Stoeva | (Scotland) Julie MacPherson (Scotland) Ciara Torrance | 21–14, 21–12 | (gold) Winner |
| 2025 | Turkey International | (Bulgaria) Gabriela Stoeva | (Turkey) Bengisu Erçetin (Turkey) Nazlıcan İnci | 21–10, 21–19 | (gold) Winner |

BWF International Challenge tournament
BWF International Series tournament
BWF Future Series tournament
