= Archery at the 2023 European Games – Mixed team compound =

Mixed team compound at the 2023 European Games
- Venue: Plaszowianka Archery Park
- Date: 23, 25 June
- Competitors: 18 from 9 nations
- Teams: 9

Medalists
gold medal	Lisell Jäätma; Robin Jäätma	Estonia
silver medal	Tanja Gellenthien; Mathias Fullerton	Denmark
bronze medal	Elisa Roner; Marco Bruno	Italy

The mixed team compound competition at the 2023 European Games was held on 23 and 25 June at the Plaszowianka Archery Park in Kraków.

== Records ==
Prior to the competition, the existing world, European and Games records were as follows:

- 144 arrow ranking round

World record	South Korea; Kim Yun-hee; Choi Yong-hee	1424	Dhaka, Bangladesh	14 November 2021
European record	Slovenia; Toja Ellison; Aljaž Brenk	1421	Kamnik, Slovenia	6 May 2022
Games record	Russia; Natalia Avdeeva; Anton Bulaev	1400	Minsk, Belarus	21 June 2019

- Mixed team match

World record	South Korea; So Chae-won; Kim Jong-ho	160/8	Antalya, Turkey	24 May 2018
European record	Netherlands; Jody Beckers; Mike Schloesser	159	Lausanne, Switzerland	20 May 2021
Games record	Germany; Janine Meißner; Marcel Trachsel	155	Minsk, Belarus	21 June 2019

== Results ==
=== Qualification round ===
Rank	Nation	Archer	Individual total	Team total	Notes
1	Denmark	Tanja Gellenthien	712	1429; WR	
1	Denmark	Mathias Fullerton	717	1429; WR	
2	Turkey	Hazal Burun	705	1417	
2	Turkey	Emircan Haney	712	1417	
3	France	Sophie Dodemont	699	1415	
3	France	Nicolas Girard	716	1415	
4	Netherlands	Sanne de Laat	696	1414	
4	Netherlands	Mike Schloesser	718	1414	
5	Italy	Elisa Roner	703	1411	
5	Italy	Marco Bruno	708	1411	
6	Estonia	Lisell Jäätma	708	1407	
6	Estonia	Robin Jäätma	699	1407	
7	Spain	Andrea Muñoz	702	1404	
7	Spain	Ramón López	702	1404	
8	Poland	Małgorzata Kapusta	679	1394	T. 103;59
8	Poland	Łukasz Przybylski	715	1394	T. 103;59
9	Germany	Katharina Raab	693	1394	T. 102;49
9	Germany	Henning Lüpkemann	701	1394	T. 102;49

=== Elimination round ===
Round of 16
9	Raab (GER); Lüpkemann (GER)	154
8	Kapusta (POL); Przybylski (POL)	152

Quarterfinals
1	Gellenthien (DEN); Fullerton (DEN)	158
9	Raab (GER); Lüpkemann (GER)	154
5	Roner (ITA); Bruno (ITA)	156^{20+}
4	De Laat (NED); Schloesser (NED)	156^{20}
3	Dodemont (FRA); Girard (FRA)	156
6	L Jäätma (EST); R Jäätma (EST)	159; GR
7	Muñoz (ESP); López (ESP)	148
2	Burun (TUR); Haney (TUR)	155

Semifinals
1	Gellenthien (DEN); Fullerton (DEN)	156
5	Roner (ITA); Bruno (ITA)	154
6	L Jäätma (EST); R Jäätma (EST)	159^{20+}
2	Burun (TUR); Haney (TUR)	159^{20} GR

Gold medal match
1	Gellenthien (DEN); Fullerton (DEN)	156^{19}
6	L Jäätma (EST); R Jäätma (EST)	156^{20}
Bronze medal match
5	Roner (ITA); Bruno (ITA)	153
2	Burun (TUR); Haney (TUR)	152
