= Selena Piek =

Dutch badminton player (born 1991)

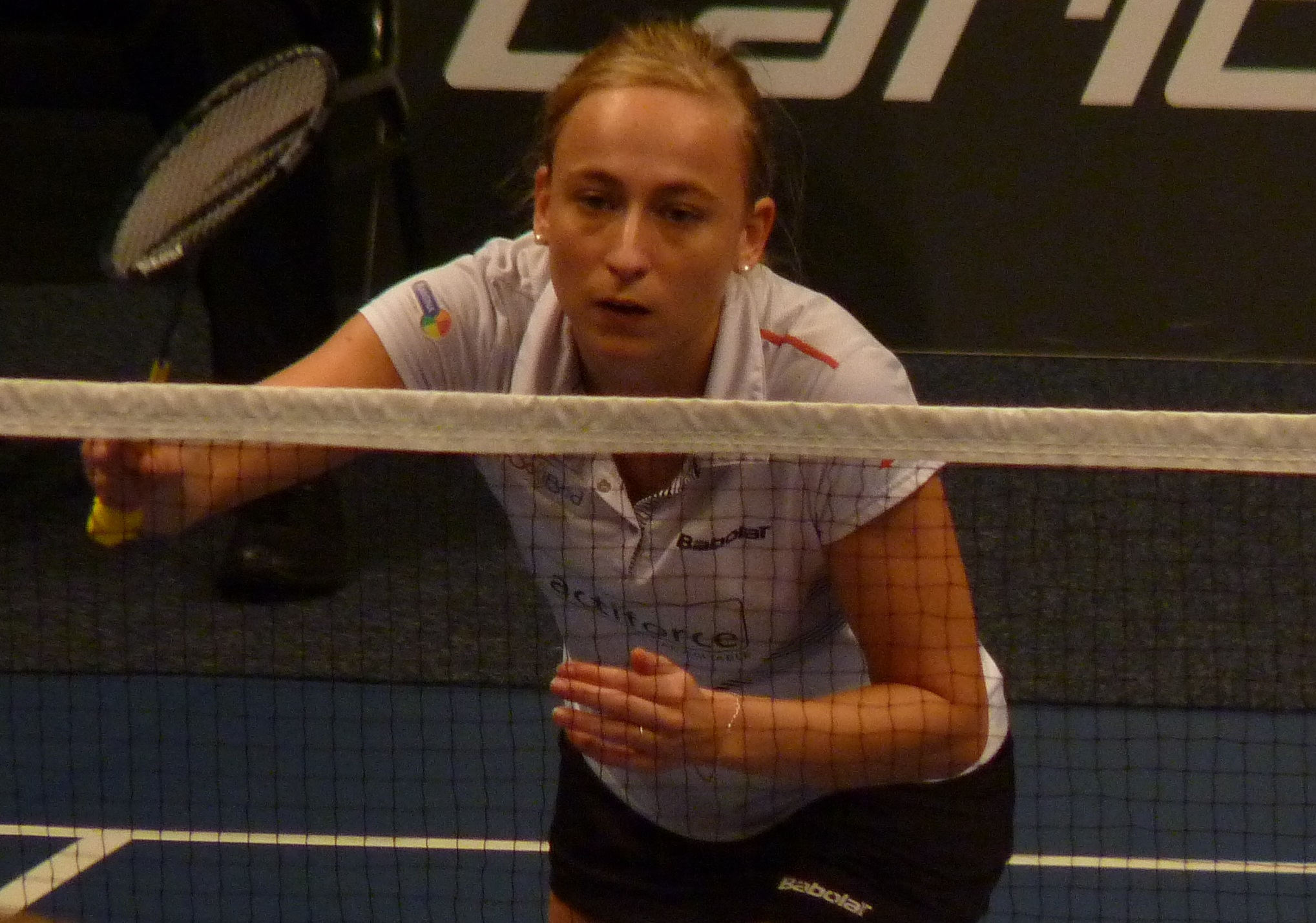
- Piek at the 2016 Dutch National Badminton Championships

Personal information
- Born: 30 September 1991 (age 35) Blaricum, Netherlands
- Height: 1.66 m (5 ft 5 in)
- Weight: 59 kg (130 lb)

Sport
- Country: Netherlands
- Sport: Badminton
- Handedness: Right
- Coached by: Joachim Fischer Nielsen; Henri Vervoort

Women's & mixed doubles
- Highest ranking: 7 (WD with Eefje Muskens, 11 February 2016); 8 (XD with Robin Tabeling, 18 July 2023); 12 (XD with Jacco Arends, 26 November 2015)
- BWF profile
Medal record
Women's badminton
Representing Netherlands
European Games
| Gold medal – first place | 2019 Minsk | Women's doubles |
| Gold medal – first place | 2023 Kraków-Małopolska | Mixed doubles |
European Championships
| Silver medal – second place | 2016 La Roche-sur-Yon | Women's doubles |
| Bronze medal – third place | 2014 Kazan | Women's doubles |
| Bronze medal – third place | 2016 La Roche-sur-Yon | Mixed doubles |
| Bronze medal – third place | 2018 Huelva | Women's doubles |
| Bronze medal – third place | 2021 Kyiv | Women's doubles |
| Bronze medal – third place | 2022 Madrid | Mixed doubles |
| Bronze medal – third place | 2024 Saarbrücken | Mixed doubles |
European Mixed Team Championships
| Bronze medal – third place | 2019 Copenhagen | Mixed team |
European Women's Team Championships
| Bronze medal – third place | 2012 Amsterdam | Women's team |
European Junior Championships
| Gold medal – first place | 2009 Milan | Mixed doubles |
| Silver medal – second place | 2007 Völklingen | Mixed team |
| Silver medal – second place | 2009 Milan | Women's doubles |
| Silver medal – second place | 2009 Milan | Mixed team |

Selena Piek (born 30 September 1991) is a Dutch badminton player who specializes in doubles. She won the gold medals at the European Games in 2019 in the women's doubles, and in 2023 in the mixed doubles. She was part of the Badminton Europe Athletes' Commission from 2016 to 2020.

Since joining the national team when she was 15, Piek has shown her talent in playing doubles. She won gold in the mixed doubles and silver medal in the girls' doubles at the 2009 European Junior Championships. She reached a career high of world number 7 in the women's doubles with Eefje Muskens and number 8 in the mixed doubles with Robin Tabeling. She participated in two events, mixed and women's doubles at two Olympic Games in 2016 in Rio de Janeiro and 2020 in Tokyo, where she reached the quarter-finals in 2016 with Muskens and in 2020 with Cheryl Seinen. She also participated at the 2024 Paris Summer Olympics in the mixed doubles event with Robin Tabeling.

== Career ==
Piek started playing badminton at a young age and left her home in Weesp to join the Dutch National junior badminton squad at Papendal when she was 15 years old. Ever since then she lived close by Papendal in the Dutch city of Arnhem. Her early international glory was together first with partner Iris Tabeling, then with partner Eefje Muskens in the women's doubles event and first also with partner Jacco Arends in the mixed doubles event.

Her last women's doubles partner was Cheryl Seinen and currently her only focus internationally is in the mixed doubles event with Robin Tabeling. She won her first National doubles title in 2012 with Iris Tabeling. Thereafter, she won the 2014, 2015 and 2016 editions of Dutch National Badminton Championships with Eefje Muskens. She won another three National doubles events with partner Cheryl Seinen in 2018, 2019 and 2020. She has also won the mixed doubles National championships title seven times since 2012 with four different partners (2012 with Dave Khodabux, 2013 with Ruud Bosch, 2014–2016 with Jacco Arends, 2020 and 2023 with Robin Tabeling).

Piek was the gold medalist at the 2019 European Games in the women's doubles event with Cheryl Seinen.

She reached the Olympics quarter finals twice; at the Rio Olympics 2016 with Eefje Muskens and the Tokyo Olympics 2020 with Cheryl Seinen. In the Dutch Eredivisie league, she is playing for Duinwijck in Haarlem, while in Denmark in the Elite league her club is Højbjerg Badminton Klub.

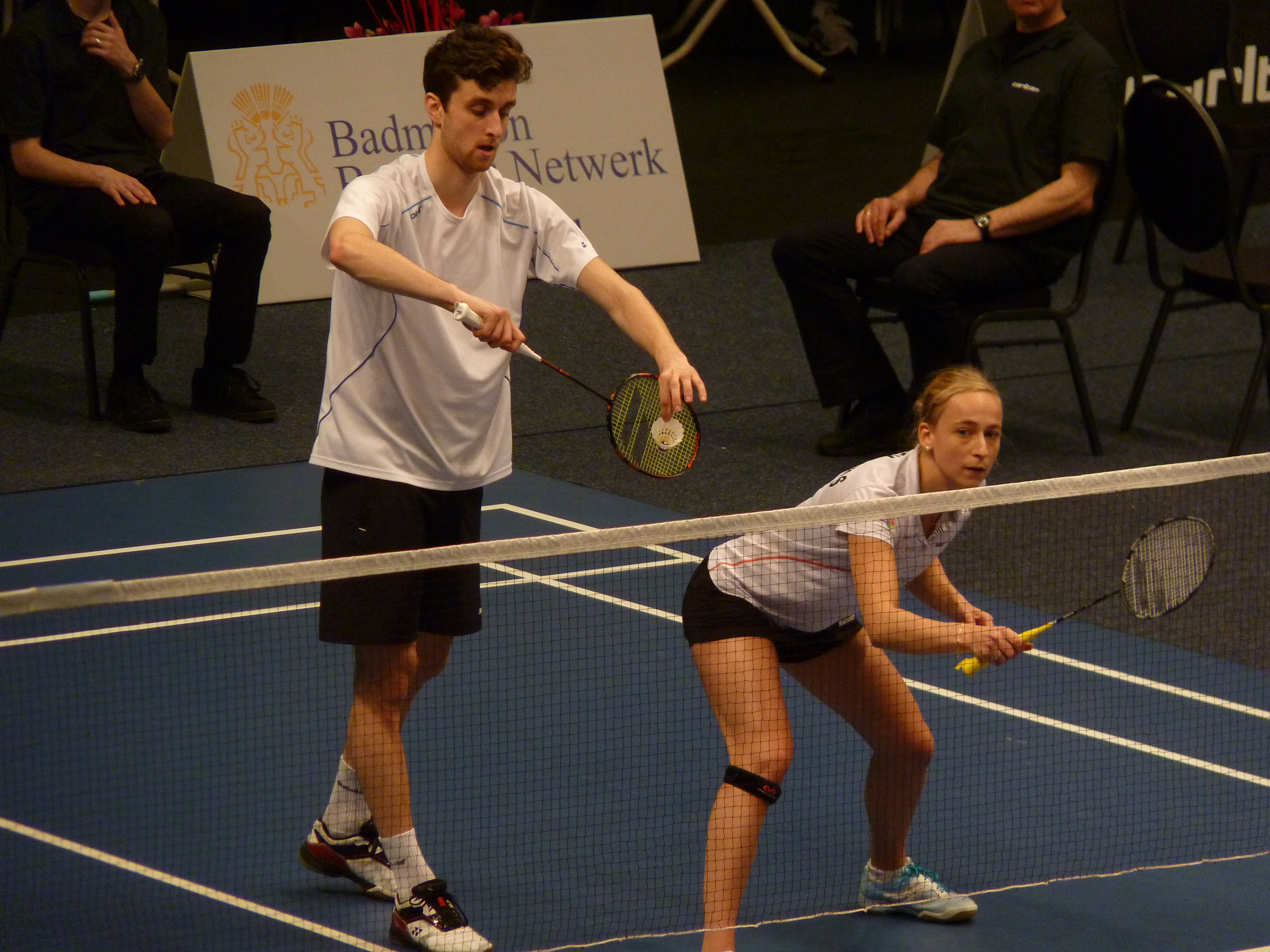
Jacco Arends and Selena Piek in action

=== 2023: Second European Games gold ===
Piek and her partner, Tabeling, started the 2023 season on the Asian tour with unsatisfactory results. They had to accept defeat in the early rounds at the Malaysia and India Opens as well as at the Indonesia Masters in January. Their performance then improved in March, reaching the quarter-finals at the All England Open and the semi-finals at the Swiss Open. In July, Piek won her second gold medal at the European Games by winning the mixed doubles title with Tabeling, where she previously in 2019 won the women's doubles with Cheryl Seinen. In the remaining tournaments in 2023, Piek and Tabeling did not win any BWF World Tour, with their best were reaching the quarter-finals at the Hylo Open.

=== 2024: 7th medals in the European Championships ===
In the first semester of 2024, Piek and her partner, Robin Tabeling has not won any single title. The best results that they achieved were a semi-finalists in the German, All England, and Swiss Opens. She then captured her seventh medal in the European Championships by winning the mixed doubles bronze, after losing to 1st seeded Mathias Christiansen and Alexandra Bøje in the semi-finals.

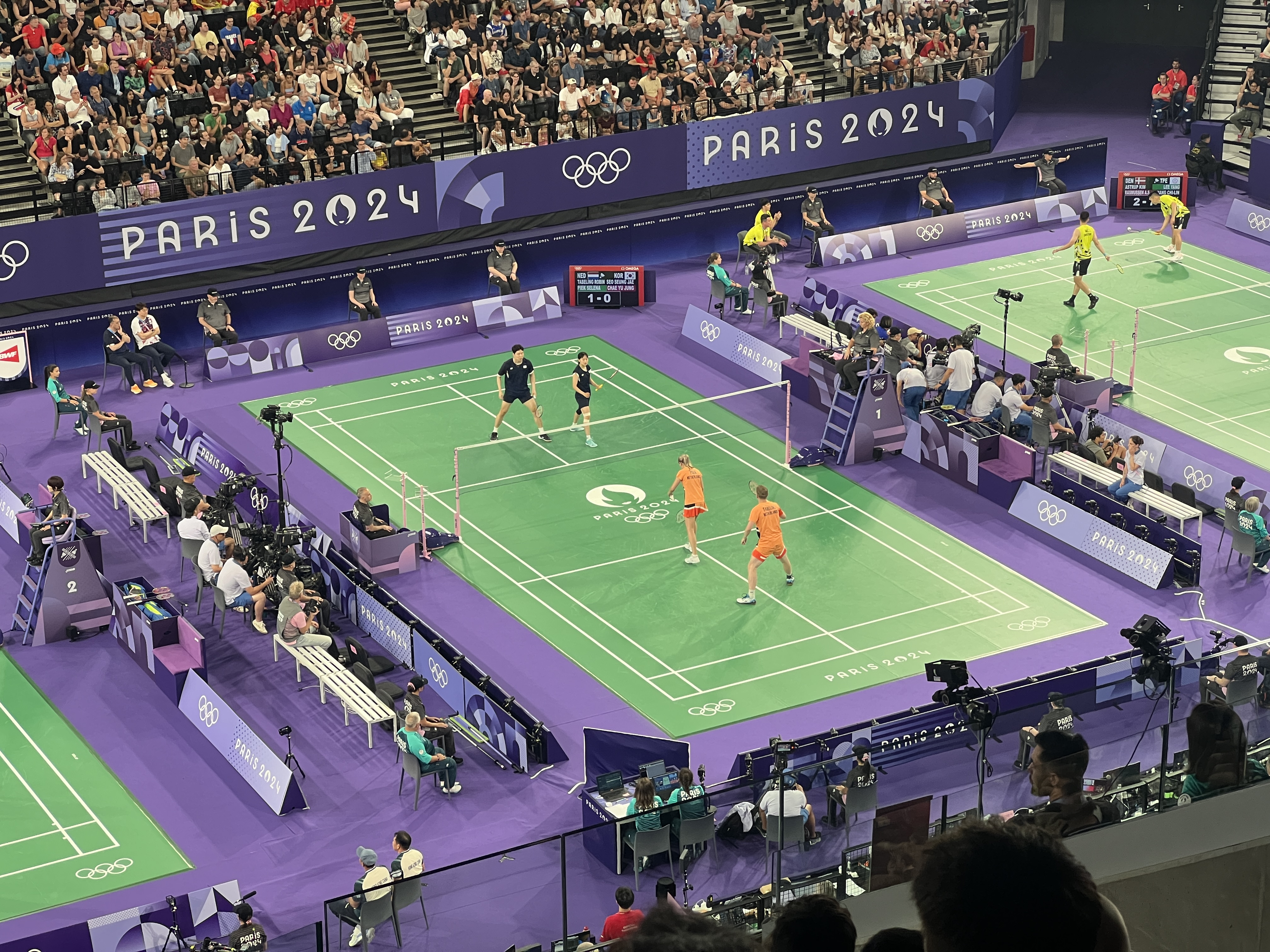
Piek and Tabeling during a match against Seo Seung-jae and Chae Yoo-jung at the 2024 Summer Olympics

Piek made her third appearance at the Olympics by competing in the mixed doubles with Tabeling, but the duo was eliminated in the group stage.

== Achievements ==
=== European Games ===
Women's doubles
| Year | Venue | Partner | Opponent | Score | Result |
|---|---|---|---|---|---|
| 2019 | Falcon Club; Minsk, Belarus | (Netherlands) Cheryl Seinen | (United Kingdom) Chloe Birch (United Kingdom) Lauren Smith | 14–21, 21–13, 21–15 | Gold |

Mixed doubles
| Year | Venue | Partner | Opponent | Score | Result |
|---|---|---|---|---|---|
| 2023 | Arena Jaskółka; Tarnów, Poland | (Netherlands) Robin Tabeling | (France) Thom Gicquel (France) Delphine Delrue | 21–10, 13–21, 21–13 | Gold |

=== European Championships ===
Women's doubles
| Year | Venue | Partner | Opponent | Score | Result |
|---|---|---|---|---|---|
| 2014 | Gymnastics Center; Kazan, Russia | (Netherlands) Eefje Muskens | (Denmark) Line Damkjær Kruse (Denmark) Marie Røpke | 23–25, 11–21 | Bronze |
| 2016 | Vendéspace; La Roche-sur-Yon, France | (Netherlands) Eefje Muskens | (Denmark) Christinna Pedersen (Denmark) Kamilla Rytter Juhl | 18–21, 17–21 | Silver |
| 2018 | Palacio de los Deportes Carolina Marín; Huelva, Spain | (Netherlands) Cheryl Seinen | (France) Émilie Lefel (France) Anne Tran | 21–17, 18–21, 19–21 | Bronze |
| 2021 | Palace of Sports; Kyiv, Ukraine | (Netherlands) Cheryl Seinen | (England) Chloe Birch (England) Lauren Smith | 18–21, 16–21 | Bronze |

Mixed doubles
| Year | Venue | Partner | Opponent | Score | Result |
|---|---|---|---|---|---|
| 2016 | Vendéspace; La Roche-sur-Yon, France | (Netherlands) Jacco Arends | (Denmark) Joachim Fischer Nielsen (Denmark) Christinna Pedersen | 17–21, 8–21 | Bronze |
| 2022 | Polideportivo Municipal Gallur; Madrid, Spain | (Netherlands) Robin Tabeling | (France) Thom Gicquel (France) Delphine Delrue | 19–21, 15–21 | Bronze |
| 2024 | Saarlandhalle; Saarbrücken, Germany | (Netherlands) Robin Tabeling | (Denmark) Mathias Christiansen (Denmark) Alexandra Bøje | 23–25, 23–21, 18–21 | Bronze |

=== European Junior Championships ===
Girls' doubles
| Year | Venue | Partner | Opponent | Score | Result |
|---|---|---|---|---|---|
| 2009 | Federal Technical Centre - Palabadminton; Milan, Italy | (Netherlands) Iris Tabeling | (Russia) Anastasia Chervyakova (Russia) Romina Gabdullina | 13–21, 17–21 | Silver |

Mixed doubles
| Year | Venue | Partner | Opponent | Score | Result |
|---|---|---|---|---|---|
| 2009 | Federal Technical Centre - Palabadminton; Milan, Italy | (Netherlands) Jacco Arends | (Germany) Jonas Geigenberger (Germany) Fabienne Deprez | 21–16, 20–22, 21–19 | Gold |

=== BWF World Tour (1 title, 3 runners-up) ===
The BWF World Tour, which was announced on 19 March 2017 and implemented in 2018, is a series of elite badminton tournaments sanctioned by the Badminton World Federation (BWF). The BWF World Tour is divided into levels of World Tour Finals, Super 1000, Super 750, Super 500, Super 300, and the BWF Tour Super 100.

Women's doubles
| Year | Tournament | Level | Partner | Opponent | Score | Result |
|---|---|---|---|---|---|---|
| 2018 | Dutch Open | Super 100 | (Netherlands) Cheryl Seinen | (Bulgaria) Gabriela Stoeva (Bulgaria) Stefani Stoeva | 17–21, 18–21 | (silver) Runner-up |

Mixed doubles
| Year | Tournament | Level | Partner | Opponent | Score | Result |
|---|---|---|---|---|---|---|
| 2018 | Scottish Open | Super 100 | (Netherlands) Jacco Arends | (England) Marcus Ellis (England) Lauren Smith | 6–13 retired | (silver) Runner-up |
| 2019 | Dutch Open | Super 100 | (Netherlands) Robin Tabeling | (England) Chris Adcock (England) Gabby Adcock | 21–17, 21–13 | (gold) Winner |
| 2022 | French Open | Super 750 | (Netherlands) Robin Tabeling | (China) Zheng Siwei (China) Huang Yaqiong | 16–21, 21–14, 20–22 | (silver) Runner-up |

=== BWF Grand Prix (6 titles, 6 runners-up) ===
The BWF Grand Prix had two levels, the Grand Prix and Grand Prix Gold. It was a series of badminton tournaments sanctioned by the Badminton World Federation (BWF) and played between 2007 and 2017.

Women's doubles
| Year | Tournament | Partner | Opponent | Score | Result |
|---|---|---|---|---|---|
| 2012 | Dutch Open | (Netherlands) Iris Tabeling | (Netherlands) Samantha Barning (Netherlands) Eefje Muskens | 19–21, 21–16, 22–20 | (gold) Winner |
| 2013 | Canada Open | (Netherlands) Eefje Muskens | (China) Huang Yaqiong (China) Yu Xiaohan | 21–13, 11–21, 13–21 | (silver) Runner-up |
| 2013 | Bitburger Open | (Netherlands) Eefje Muskens | (Malaysia) Ng Hui Ern (Malaysia) Ng Hui Lin | 22–20, 21–15 | (gold) Winner |
| 2013 | Scottish Open | (Netherlands) Eefje Muskens | (Malaysia) Ng Hui Ern (Malaysia) Ng Hui Lin | 25–23, 15–21, 21–16 | (gold) Winner |
| 2014 | Dutch Open | (Netherlands) Eefje Muskens | (Indonesia) Shendy Puspa Irawati (Indonesia) Vita Marissa | 11–8, 4–11, 11–9, 11–10 | (gold) Winner |
| 2015 | Canada Open | (Netherlands) Eefje Muskens | (India) Jwala Gutta (India) Ashwini Ponnappa | 19–21, 16–21 | (silver) Runner-up |
| 2015 | Dutch Open | (Netherlands) Eefje Muskens | (Bulgaria) Gabriela Stoeva (Bulgaria) Stefani Stoeva | 22–24, 15–21 | (silver) Runner-up |
| 2015 | Brasil Open | (Netherlands) Eefje Muskens | (China) Chen Qingchen (China) Jia Yifan | 17–21, 14–21 | (silver) Runner-up |
| 2016 | Syed Modi International | (Netherlands) Eefje Muskens | (South Korea) Jung Kyung-eun (South Korea) Shin Seung-chan | 15–21, 13–21 | (silver) Runner-up |
| 2017 | Scottish Open | (Netherlands) Cheryl Seinen | (Russia) Ekaterina Bolotova (Russia) Alina Davletova | 15–21, 21–15, 21–11 | (gold) Winner |

Mixed doubles
| Year | Tournament | Partner | Opponent | Score | Result |
|---|---|---|---|---|---|
| 2017 | Dutch Open | (Netherlands) Jacco Arends | (England) Marcus Ellis (England) Lauren Smith | 17–21, 18–21 | (silver) Runner-up |
| 2017 | Scottish Open | (Netherlands) Jacco Arends | (Denmark) Mikkel Mikkelsen (Denmark) Mai Surrow | 21–10, 21–10 | (gold) Winner |

BWF Grand Prix Gold tournament
BWF Grand Prix tournament

=== BWF International Challenge/Series (28 titles, 9 runners-up) ===
Women's doubles
| Year | Tournament | Partner | Opponent | Score | Result |
|---|---|---|---|---|---|
| 2010 | Slovak Open | (Netherlands) Iris Tabeling | (Ukraine) Marija Ulitina (Ukraine) Natalya Voytsekh | 21–10, 21–18 | (gold) Winner |
| 2010 | Czech International | (Netherlands) Iris Tabeling | (Denmark) Maria Helsbøl (Denmark) Anne Skelbæk | 22–20, 15–21, 21–7 | (gold) Winner |
| 2010 | Italian International | (Netherlands) Iris Tabeling | (Poland) Malgorzata Kurdelska (Poland) Natalia Pocztowiak | 21–15, 21–9 | (gold) Winner |
| 2011 | Estonian International | (Netherlands) Iris Tabeling | (Ukraine) Marija Ulitina (Ukraine) Natalya Voytsekh | 21–12, 21–16 | (gold) Winner |
| 2011 | Slovak Open | (Netherlands) Iris Tabeling | (Turkey) Özge Bayrak (Turkey) Neslihan Yiğit | 21–7, 21–9 | (gold) Winner |
| 2012 | Estonian International | (Netherlands) Iris Tabeling | (Netherlands) Samantha Barning (Netherlands) Ilse Vaessen | 21–15, 13–21, 21–10 | (gold) Winner |
| 2012 | Dutch International | (Netherlands) Iris Tabeling | (Netherlands) Lotte Jonathans (Netherlands) Paulien van Dooremalen | 21–17, 19–21, 21–23 | (silver) Runner-up |
| 2012 | Belgian International | (Netherlands) Iris Tabeling | (Germany) Johanna Goliszewski (Netherlands) Judith Meulendijks | 24–22, 21–18 | (gold) Winner |
| 2012 | Norwegian International | (Netherlands) Iris Tabeling | (Netherlands) Samantha Barning (Netherlands) Eefje Muskens | 20–22, 16–21 | (silver) Runner-up |
| 2013 | Swedish Masters | (Netherlands) Iris Tabeling | (Sweden) Emelie Lennartsson (Sweden) Emma Wengberg | 21–15, 21–16 | (gold) Winner |
| 2013 | Irish Open | (Netherlands) Eefje Muskens | (Malaysia) Ng Hui Ern (Malaysia) Ng Hui Lin | 21–17, 21–10 | (gold) Winner |
| 2013 | Italian International | (Netherlands) Eefje Muskens | (Australia) He Tian Tang (Australia) Renuga Veeran | 21–10, 21–8 | (gold) Winner |
| 2014 | Swedish Masters | (Netherlands) Eefje Muskens | (Denmark) Line Damkjær Kruse (Denmark) Marie Røpke | 21–19, 21–11 | (gold) Winner |
| 2014 | Belgian International | (Netherlands) Eefje Muskens | (Netherlands) Samantha Barning (Netherlands) Iris Tabeling | 11–9, 9–11, 11–8, 10–11, 11–7 | (gold) Winner |
| 2017 | Belgian International | (Netherlands) Cheryl Seinen | (Netherlands) Debora Jille (Netherlands) Imke van der Aar | 21–14, 21–16 | (gold) Winner |

Mixed doubles
| Year | Tournament | Partner | Opponent | Score | Result |
|---|---|---|---|---|---|
| 2010 | Portugal International | (Netherlands) Jacco Arends | (Croatia) Zvonimir Đurkinjak (Croatia) Staša Poznanović | 14–21, 21–18, 11–21 | (silver) Runner-up |
| 2010 | Slovak Open | (Netherlands) Jacco Arends | (Belarus) Aleksei Konakh (Belarus) Alesia Zaitsava | 21–15, 21–14 | (gold) Winner |
| 2010 | Hungarian International | (Netherlands) Jacco Arends | (Germany) Peter Käsbauer (Germany) Johanna Goliszewski | 21–15, 21–14 | (gold) Winner |
| 2011 | Estonian International | (Netherlands) Jacco Arends | (Germany) Tim Dettmann (Netherlands) Ilse Vaessen | 21–12, 21–14 | (gold) Winner |
| 2011 | Slovak Open | (Netherlands) Dave Khodabux | (Poland) Wojciech Szkudlarczyk (Poland) Agnieszka Wojtkowska | 21–13, 21–18 | (gold) Winner |
| 2011 | Belgian International | (Netherlands) Jorrit de Ruiter | (Singapore) Chayut Triyachart (Singapore) Yao Lei | 25–23, 16–21, 14–21 | (silver) Runner-up |
| 2011 | Irish Open | (Netherlands) Dave Khodabux | (England) Marcus Ellis (England) Heather Olver | 19–21, 17–21 | (silver) Runner-up |
| 2012 | Estonian International | (Netherlands) Dave Khodabux | (Netherlands) Jorrit de Ruiter (Netherlands) Samantha Barning | 21–7, 21–12 | (gold) Winner |
| 2012 | Scottish International | (Netherlands) Ruud Bosch | (England) Marcus Ellis (England) Gabrielle White | 16–21, 16–21 | (silver) Runner-up |
| 2013 | Belgian International | (Netherlands) Jacco Arends | (Denmark) Anders Skaarup Rasmussen (Denmark) Lena Grebak | 18–21, 21–9, 15–21 | (silver) Runner-up |
| 2013 | Irish Open | (Netherlands) Jacco Arends | (Scotland) Robert Blair (Scotland) Imogen Bankier | 9–21, 21–19, 21–13 | (gold) Winner |
| 2013 | Italian International | (Netherlands) Jacco Arends | (Croatia) Zvonimir Đurkinjak (United States) Eva Lee | 21–23, 18–21 | (gold) Winner |
| 2014 | Belgian International | (Netherlands) Jacco Arends | (Netherlands) Jelle Maas (Netherlands) Iris Tabeling | 11–5, 11–10, 11–7 | (gold) Winner |
| 2015 | Swedish Masters | (Netherlands) Jacco Arends | (Russia) Vitalij Durkin (Russia) Nina Vislova | 21–17, 17–21, 21–14 | (gold) Winner |
| 2017 | Belgian International | (Netherlands) Jacco Arends | (Republic of Ireland) Scott Evans (Sweden) Amanda Högström | 21–17, 21–9 | (gold) Winner |
| 2018 | Belgian International | (Netherlands) Jacco Arends | (Scotland) Adam Hall (Scotland) Julie MacPherson | 21–11, 21–13 | (gold) Winner |
| 2019 | Austrian Open | (Netherlands) Robin Tabeling | (Singapore) Danny Bawa Chrisnanta (Singapore) Tan Wei Han | 19–21, 21–16, 21–12 | (gold) Winner |
| 2019 | Brazil International | (Netherlands) Robin Tabeling | (Netherlands) Jacco Arends (Netherlands) Cheryl Seinen | 16–21, 23–21, 21–17 | (gold) Winner |
| 2021 | Dutch Open | (Netherlands) Robin Tabeling | (Denmark) Mikkel Mikkelsen (Denmark) Rikke Søby Hansen | 18–21, 21–13, 15–21 | (silver) Runner-up |
| 2021 | Irish Open | (Netherlands) Robin Tabeling | (Denmark) Mikkel Mikkelsen (Denmark) Rikke Søby Hansen | 21–18, 21–15 | (gold) Winner |
| 2022 | Dutch Open | (Netherlands) Robin Tabeling | (England) Callum Hemming (England) Jessica Pugh | 21–17, 21–12 | (gold) Winner |
| 2024 | Dutch Open | (Netherlands) Robin Tabeling | (England) Callum Hemming (England) Estelle van Leeuwen | 21–17, 15–21, 20–22 | (silver) Runner-up |

BWF International Challenge tournament
BWF International Series tournament
BWF Future Series tournament
