= Gabriela Stoeva =

Bulgarian badminton player (born 1994)

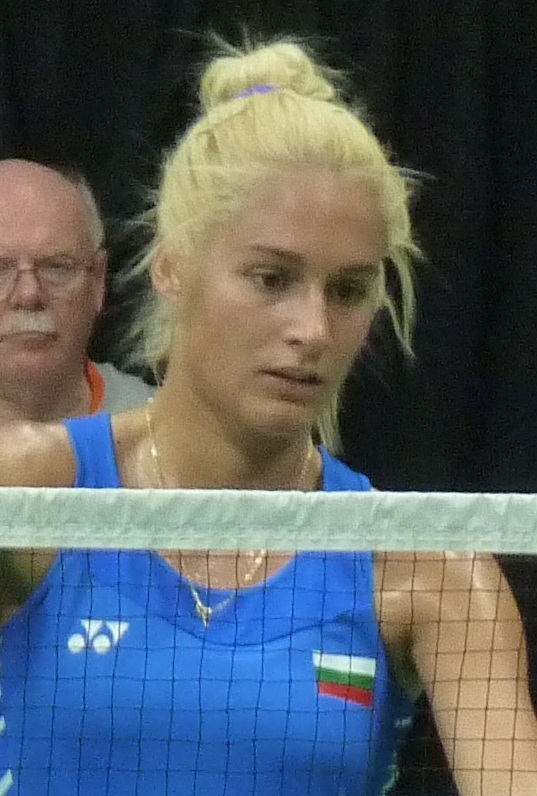
- Stoeva at the 2018 Dutch Open

Personal information
- Born: 15 July 1994 (age 32) Haskovo, Bulgaria
- Years active: 2009–present
- Height: 1.68 m (5 ft 6 in)

Sport
- Country: Bulgaria
- Sport: Badminton
- Handedness: Right

Women's doubles
- Highest ranking: 8 (with Stefani Stoeva, 8 November 2018)
- Current ranking: 9 (with Stefani Stoeva, 3 November 2026)
- BWF profile
Medal record
Women's badminton
Representing Bulgaria
European Games
Gold medal – first place	2015 Baku	Women's doubles
Gold medal – first place	2023 Kraków–Małopolska	Women's doubles
European Championships
Gold medal – first place	2018 Huelva	Women's doubles
Gold medal – first place	2021 Kyiv	Women's doubles
Gold medal – first place	2022 Madrid	Women's doubles
Gold medal – first place	2025 Horsens	Women's doubles
Gold medal – first place	2026 Huelva	Women's doubles
Silver medal – second place	2017 Kolding	Women's doubles
Silver medal – second place	2024 Saarbrücken	Women's doubles
European Women's Team Championships
Gold medal – first place	2026 Istanbul	Women's team
Silver medal – second place	2016 Kazan	Women's team
Bronze medal – third place	2014 Basel	Women's team
European Junior Championships
Gold medal – first place	2013 Ankara	Women's doubles

Gabriela Stoeva (Bulgarian: Габриела Стоева; born 15 July 1994) is a Bulgarian badminton player specializing in doubles. Her current partner is her younger sister, Stefani Stoeva. The pair is the five-time European Champion and two-time European Games gold medalist as well. They competed at the 2016, 2020 and the 2024 Summer Olympics.

== Career ==
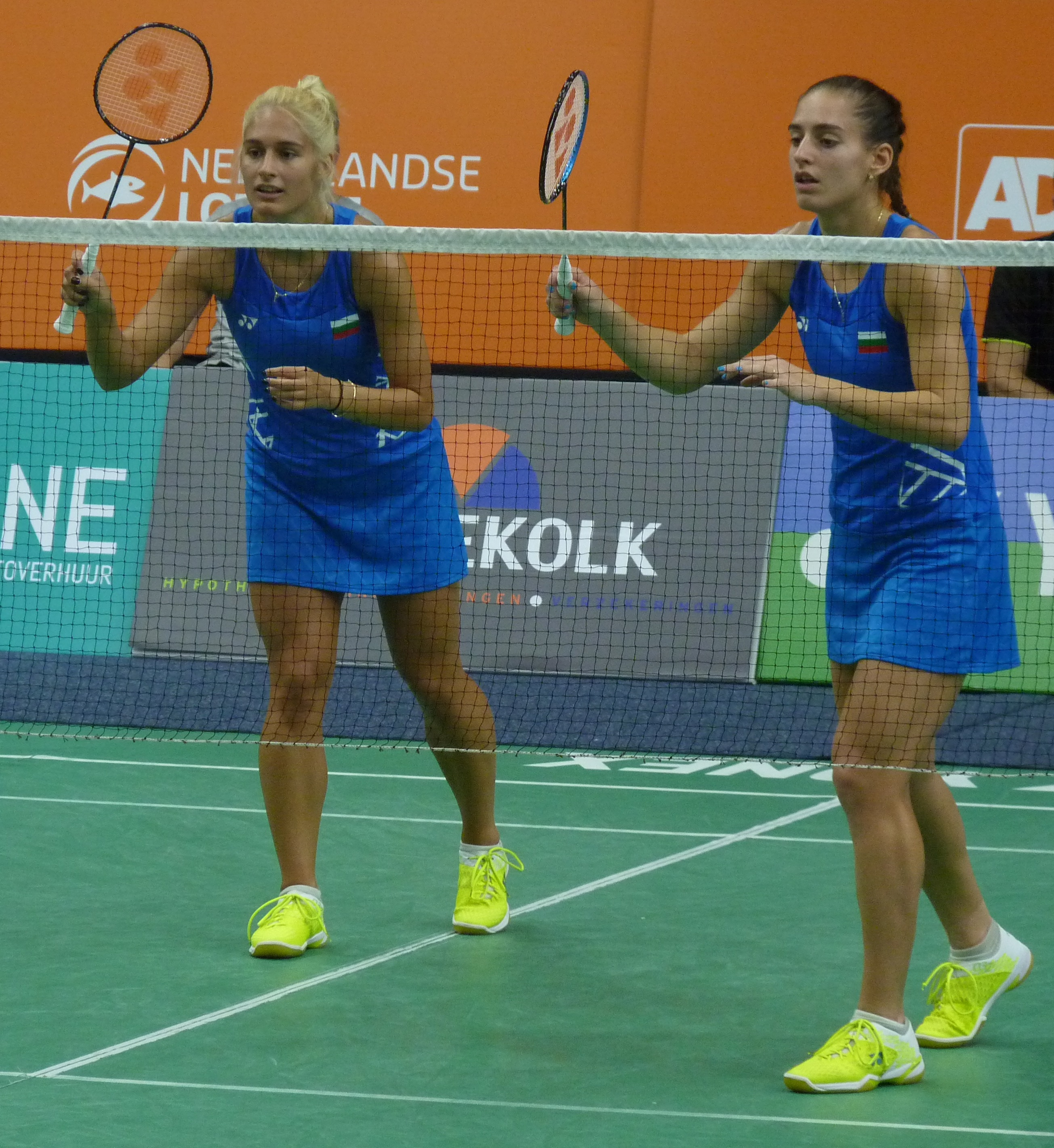
Gabriela playing with her sister, Stefani

Gabriela Stoeva started playing badminton at age 10 in the Haskovo School Club. She joined the national team in 2008, and made a debut in the international event in 2009. In 2009, she won a bronze medal at the European U-17 Championships in the girls' doubles event partnered with her sister, Stefani Stoeva. And at the 2013 European U-19 Championships, the sister won the gold medal.

Stoeva won her first BWF Grand Prix title at the 2014 Scottish Open in the women's doubles event with her sister. They beat Heather Olver and Lauren Smith of England in the finals round with the score 21-7 21–15. In 2015, she also won the Grand Prix tournament at the Russian and Dutch Open. Stoeva competed in the 2015 European Games, winning gold in women's doubles alongside her younger sister

In 2017, the Stoevas finished as the runner-ups at the Swiss Open Grand Prix Gold tournament, losing to the Chinese pair Chen Qingchen and Jia Yifan in the straight games. The sisters also won the silver medal at the European Championships.

=== 2018–2019: First ever Bulgarian to win the European Championships title ===
Gabriela started the 2018 season by finished as women's doubles runner-up in the Swiss Open with her sister Stefani. They then won their first title of the year in the Orléans Masters. Competing as the second seed in the European Championship, the Stoeva took advantage of the absence of the top seed Kamilla Rytter Juhl and Christinna Pedersen, by winning their first ever European title, becoming the first Bulgarian players to win the European title since the tournament was first held in 1968. At the home soil, Bulgarian Open, she played in two events, the women's doubles with her sister, while in the mixed doubles with Jakub Bitman of Czechia. She won the women's doubles title and reached the semi-finals in the mixed doubles. The Stoeva are increasingly being considered on the BWF World Tour, as proven by their ability to reach the semi-finals at the China Open, beating top pairs such as Lee So-hee and Shin Seung-chan in the second round, and then Chen Qingchen and Jia Yifan in the quarter-finals. They are increasingly successful in Europe by winning titles such as Dutch Open, SaarLorLux Open, and Scottish Open, as well being runner-up in the French Open. They then reached their career high as world number 8 in the BWF World rankings, and also closed the season ranked as number 7 in the Tour Finals rankings.

=== 2020–2021: Second European Championships title ===
Gabriela and her partner Stefani were lost in the initial rounds in two opening tournaments in 2020. They lost in the first round to Chang Ye-na and Kim Hye-rin at the Indonesia Masters, and to world number 1 Chen Qingchen and Jia Yifan in the Thailand Masters. The Stoeva then reached the final in the Spain Masters, losing the final to Greysia Polii and Apriyani Rahayu in a close rubber games. Due to the COVID-19 pandemic, numerous tournaments on the 2020 BWF World Tour were either cancelled or rescheduled for later in the year, they then felt the atmosphere of a tournament in Sofia in October, at the Bulgarian International, where she and her partner emerged victory at that tournament. The duo then ended the season by winning the Super 100 event at the SaarLorLux Open.

The Stoevas opened the 2021 season as the finalists in the Swiss Open, losing the title to the rising Malaysian pair Pearly Tan and Thinaah Muralitharan. They then finished runner-up in the Orléans Masters this time losing to Jongkolphan Kititharakul and Rawinda Prajongjai of Thailand. The duo then clinched their first title of the year by winning their second European Championships title in Kyiv, Ukraine. The duo competed at the 2020 Tokyo Olympics but were eliminated in the group stage.

=== 2022: 3rd European Championships title ===
Gabriela and her partner Stefani opened the 2022 season with quite satisfactory results, by becoming finalists in the German Open. They then won 3 consecutive tournaments, in the Swiss Open, Orléans Masters and in their third European Championships.

Gabriela and Stefani ended the year on poor form, exiting four of their final six tournaments in the first round. She stated that their partnerships were lost communication on court, only arguing, and the energy around them was pretty negative.

=== 2023: Second European Games gold ===
In the first semester of 2023, Stoeva has not been able to win any single titles, as her best results with Stefani was being quarter-finalists in the Malaysia, India and the German Opens. Gabriela tried to partner with young player, Kaloyana Nalbantova, and was able to reach the quarter-finals in the Dutch International.

Gabriela and Stefani claimed their first title of the year by winning the gold medal at the European Games, beating Dutch pair Debora Jille and Cheryl Seinen in the finals. They also competed in the BWF World Championships, but had to be knocked out in the early rounds by Yeung Nga Ting and Yeung Pui Lam of Hong Kong. In the remaining tournaments in 2023, they were able to win the International Challenge titles in Scotland, Bahrain and Wales, as well as finished runner-up in the Irish Open.

=== 2024 ===
Stoeva won her first international title in 2024 at the Azerbaijan International. She and her partner reached the finals in the German Open, but lost to Chinese pair Li Yijing and Luo Xumin. As the defending champion at the European Championships, Stoeva unable to defend their title after lost to French pair Margot Lambert and Anne Tran in the final.

== Achievements ==
=== European Games ===
Women's doubles
Year	Venue	Partner	Opponent	Score	Result
2015	Baku Sports Hall, Baku, Azerbaijan	(Bulgaria) Stefani Stoeva	(Russia) Ekaterina Bolotova (Russia) Evgeniya Kosetskaya	21–12, 23–21	Gold
2023	Arena Jaskółka, Tarnów, Poland	(Bulgaria) Stefani Stoeva	(Netherlands) Debora Jille (Netherlands) Cheryl Seinen	21–7, 21–17	Gold

=== European Championships ===
Women's doubles
Year	Venue	Partner	Opponent	Score	Result
2017	Sydbank Arena, Kolding, Denmark	(Bulgaria) Stefani Stoeva	(Denmark) Christinna Pedersen (Denmark) Kamilla Rytter Juhl	11–21, 21–15, 11–21	Silver
2018	Palacio de los Deportes Carolina Marín, Huelva, Spain	(Bulgaria) Stefani Stoeva	(France) Émilie Lefel (France) Anne Tran	21–12, 21–10	Gold
2021	Palace of Sports, Kyiv, Ukraine	(Bulgaria) Stefani Stoeva	(England) Chloe Birch (England) Lauren Smith	21–14, 21–19	Gold
2022	Polideportivo Municipal Gallur, Madrid, Spain	(Bulgaria) Stefani Stoeva	(Germany) Linda Efler (Germany) Isabel Lohau	21–14, 21–10	Gold
2024	Saarlandhalle, Saarbrücken, Germany	(Bulgaria) Stefani Stoeva	(France) Margot Lambert (France) Anne Tran	21–16, 17–21, 11–21	Silver
2025	Forum, Horsens, Denmark	(Bulgaria) Stefani Stoeva	(Denmark) Natasja Anthonisen (Denmark) Maiken Fruergaard	21–11, 21–16	Gold
2026	Palacio de los Deportes Carolina Marín, Huelva, Spain	(Bulgaria) Stefani Stoeva	(Turkey) Bengisu Erçetin (Turkey) Nazlıcan İnci	21–11, 21–17	Gold

=== European Junior Championships ===
Girls' doubles
Year	Venue	Partner	Opponent	Score	Result
2013	ASKI Sport Hall, Ankara, Turkey	(Bulgaria) Stefani Stoeva	(Denmark) Julie Finne-Ipsen (Denmark) Rikke Søby Hansen	21–11, 21–18	Gold

=== BWF World Tour (10 titles, 8 runners-up) ===
The BWF World Tour, which was announced on 19 March 2017 and implemented in 2018, is a series of elite badminton tournaments sanctioned by the Badminton World Federation (BWF). The BWF World Tour is divided into levels of World Tour Finals, Super 1000, Super 750, Super 500, Super 300 (part of the HSBC World Tour), and the BWF Tour Super 100.

Women's doubles
Year	Tournament	Level	Partner	Opponent	Score	Result
2018	Swiss Open	Super 300	(Bulgaria) Stefani Stoeva	(Japan) Ayako Sakuramoto (Japan) Yukiko Takahata	21–19, 15–21, 18–21	(silver) Runner-up
2018	Orléans Masters	Super 100	(Bulgaria) Stefani Stoeva	(France) Delphine Delrue (France) Léa Palermo	21–8, 21–14	(gold) Winner
2018	Dutch Open	Super 100	(Bulgaria) Stefani Stoeva	(Netherlands) Selena Piek (Netherlands) Cheryl Seinen	21–17, 21–18	(gold) Winner
2018	French Open	Super 750	(Bulgaria) Stefani Stoeva	(Japan) Mayu Matsumoto (Japan) Wakana Nagahara	14–21, 19–21	(silver) Runner-up
2018	SaarLorLux Open	Super 100	(Bulgaria) Stefani Stoeva	(Indonesia) Ni Ketut Mahadewi Istarani (Indonesia) Rizki Amelia Pradipta	22–20, 15–21, 21–19	(gold) Winner
2018	Scottish Open	Super 100	(Bulgaria) Stefani Stoeva	(France) Émilie Lefel (France) Anne Tran	21–16, 21–9	(gold) Winner
2019	Dutch Open	Super 100	(Bulgaria) Stefani Stoeva	(Japan) Rin Iwanaga (Japan) Kie Nakanishi	21–10, 22–20	(gold) Winner
2020	Spain Masters	Super 300	(Bulgaria) Stefani Stoeva	(Indonesia) Greysia Polii (Indonesia) Apriyani Rahayu	21–18, 20–22, 17–21	(silver) Runner-up
2020	SaarLorLux Open	Super 100	(Bulgaria) Stefani Stoeva	(Denmark) Amalie Magelund (Denmark) Freja Ravn	21–8, 21–11	(gold) Winner
2021	Swiss Open	Super 300	(Bulgaria) Stefani Stoeva	(Malaysia) Pearly Tan (Malaysia) Thinaah Muralitharan	19–21, 12–21	(silver) Runner-up
2021	Orléans Masters	Super 100	(Bulgaria) Stefani Stoeva	(Thailand) Jongkolphan Kititharakul (Thailand) Rawinda Prajongjai	16–21, 16–21	(silver) Runner-up
2022	German Open	Super 300	(Bulgaria) Stefani Stoeva	(China) Chen Qingchen (China) Jia Yifan	16–21, 30–29, 19–21	(silver) Runner-up
2022	Swiss Open	Super 300	(Bulgaria) Stefani Stoeva	(Germany) Linda Efler (Germany) Isabel Lohau	21–14, 21–12	(gold) Winner
2022	Orléans Masters	Super 100	(Bulgaria) Stefani Stoeva	(Germany) Stine Küspert (Germany) Emma Moszczyński	21–15, 21–14	(gold) Winner
2024	German Open	Super 300	(Bulgaria) Stefani Stoeva	(China) Li Yijing (China) Luo Xumin	7–21, 21–13, 18–21	(silver) Runner-up
2025	German Open	Super 300	(Bulgaria) Stefani Stoeva	(Japan) Miyu Takahashi (Japan) Mizuki Otake	17–21, 22–20, 12–21	(silver) Runner-up
2025	Al Ain Masters	Super 100	(Bulgaria) Stefani Stoeva	(Chinese Taipei) Chen Yan-fei (Chinese Taipei) Sun Liang-ching	21–8, 21–13	(gold) Winner
2025	Odisha Masters	Super 100	(Bulgaria) Stefani Stoeva	(Malaysia) Ong Xin Yee (Malaysia) Carmen Ting	21–19, 21–14	(gold) Winner

=== BWF Grand Prix (3 titles, 3 runners-up) ===
The BWF Grand Prix had two levels, the Grand Prix and Grand Prix Gold. It was a series of badminton tournaments sanctioned by the Badminton World Federation (BWF) and played between 2007 and 2017.

Women's doubles
Year	Tournament	Partner	Opponent	Score	Result
2014	Brasil Open	(Bulgaria) Stefani Stoeva	(Germany) Johanna Goliszewski (Germany) Carla Nelte	5–11, 7–11, 11–4, 10–11	(silver) Runner-up
2014	Scottish Open	(Bulgaria) Stefani Stoeva	(England) Heather Olver (England) Lauren Smith	21–7, 21–15	(gold) Winner
2015	Russian Open	(Bulgaria) Stefani Stoeva	(Germany) Johanna Goliszewski (Germany) Carla Nelte	21–15, 21–17	(gold) Winner
2015	Dutch Open	(Bulgaria) Stefani Stoeva	(Netherlands) Eefje Muskens (Netherlands) Selena Piek	24–22, 21–15	(gold) Winner
2016	Dutch Open	(Bulgaria) Stefani Stoeva	(Australia) Setyana Mapasa (Australia) Gronya Somerville	21–17, 17–21, 16–21	(silver) Runner-up
2017	Swiss Open	(Bulgaria) Stefani Stoeva	(China) Chen Qingchen (China) Jia Yifan	16–21, 15–21	(silver) Runner-up

BWF Grand Prix Gold tournament
BWF Grand Prix tournament

=== BWF International Challenge/Series (38 titles, 7 runners-up) ===
Women's doubles
Year	Tournament	Partner	Opponent	Score	Result
2011	Turkiye Open	(Bulgaria) Stefani Stoeva	(England) Alexandra Langley (England) Lauren Smith	21–14, 16–21, 21–10	(gold) Winner
2012	Banuinvest International	(Bulgaria) Stefani Stoeva	(Denmark) Sandra-Maria Jensen (Denmark) Line Kjærsfeldt	19–21, 21–17, 16–21	(silver) Runner-up
2012	Bulgarian Hebar Open	(Bulgaria) Stefani Stoeva	(Bulgaria) Rumiana Ivanova (Bulgaria) Dimitria Popstoikova	15–21, 21–14, 21–11	(gold) Winner
2012	Bulgarian International	(Bulgaria) Stefani Stoeva	(Turkey) Özge Bayrak (Turkey) Neslihan Yiğit	21–9, 21–17	(gold) Winner
2012	Turkey International	(Bulgaria) Stefani Stoeva	(Turkey) Özge Bayrak (Turkey) Neslihan Yiğit	19–21, 21–14, 23–21	(gold) Winner
2013	Bulgarian Eurasia Open	(Bulgaria) Stefani Stoeva	(Bulgaria) Petya Nedelcheva (Bulgaria) Dimitria Popstoikova	11–21, 8–21	(silver) Runner-up
2013	Belgian International	(Bulgaria) Stefani Stoeva	(Scotland) Imogen Bankier (Bulgaria) Petya Nedelcheva	21–13, 11–21, 18–21	(silver) Runner-up
2013	Bulgarian International	(Bulgaria) Stefani Stoeva	(United States) Eva Lee (United States) Paula Lynn Obañana	21–15, 21–10	(gold) Winner
2013	Turkey International	(Bulgaria) Stefani Stoeva	(Turkey) Özge Bayrak (Turkey) Neslihan Yiğit	21–15, 21–8	(gold) Winner
2014	Austrian International	(Bulgaria) Stefani Stoeva	(Russia) Olga Golovanova (Russia) Viktoriia Vorobeva	21–17, 20–22, 21–15	(gold) Winner
2014	Orléans International	(Bulgaria) Stefani Stoeva	(Scotland) Imogen Bankier (Bulgaria) Petya Nedelcheva	14–21, 7–21	(silver) Runner-up
2014	Finnish Open	(Bulgaria) Stefani Stoeva	(Denmark) Line Damkjær Kruse (Denmark) Marie Røpke	17–21, 14–21	(silver) Runner-up
2014	Slovenian International	(Bulgaria) Stefani Stoeva	(Russia) Victoria Dergunova (Russia) Olga Morozova	21–16, 21–17	(gold) Winner
2014	Spanish Open	(Bulgaria) Stefani Stoeva	(Scotland) Imogen Bankier (Scotland) Kirsty Gilmour	21–14, 21–9	(gold) Winner
2014	Swiss International	(Bulgaria) Stefani Stoeva	(Indonesia) Meiliana Jauhari (Indonesia) Aprilsasi Putri Lejarsar Variella	11–6, 11–5, 11–9	(gold) Winner
2014	Turkey International	(Bulgaria) Stefani Stoeva	(Turkey) Özge Bayrak (Turkey) Neslihan Yiğit	21–11, 21–9	(gold) Winner
2015	Orléans International	(Bulgaria) Stefani Stoeva	(England) Heather Olver (England) Lauren Smith	22–20, 16–21, 21–9	(gold) Winner
2015	Spanish International	(Bulgaria) Stefani Stoeva	(Russia) Anastasia Chervyakova (Russia) Olga Morozova	21–16, 21–11	(gold) Winner
2015	Bulgarian International	(Bulgaria) Stefani Stoeva	(United States) Eva Lee (United States) Paula Lynn Obañana	21–14, 21–10	(gold) Winner
2015	Welsh International	(Bulgaria) Stefani Stoeva	(England) Heather Olver (England) Lauren Smith	21–10, 22–20	(gold) Winner
2015	Irish Open	(Bulgaria) Stefani Stoeva	(Denmark) Julie Finne-Ipsen (Denmark) Rikke Søby Hansen	21–10, 22–24, 21–9	(gold) Winner
2015	Italian International	(Bulgaria) Stefani Stoeva	(Australia) Setyana Mapasa (Australia) Gronya Somerville	21–19, 18–21, 13–6 retired	(gold) Winner
2015	Turkey International	(Bulgaria) Stefani Stoeva	(Turkey) Özge Bayrak (Turkey) Neslihan Yiğit	21–19, 21–12	(gold) Winner
2017	Bulgarian Open	(Bulgaria) Stefani Stoeva	(Turkey) Bengisu Erçetin (Turkey) Nazlıcan İnci	21–16, 21–12	(gold) Winner
2018	Bulgarian Open	(Bulgaria) Stefani Stoeva	(Denmark) Amalie Magelund (Denmark) Freja Ravn	21–16, 21–19	(gold) Winner
2019	Spanish International	(Bulgaria) Stefani Stoeva	(France) Émilie Lefel (France) Anne Tran	21–8, 21–10	(gold) Winner
2019	Belgian International	(Bulgaria) Stefani Stoeva	(Canada) Rachel Honderich (Canada) Kristen Tsai	21–16, 21–15	(gold) Winner
2019	Italian International	(Bulgaria) Stefani Stoeva	(Russia) Ekaterina Bolotova (Russia) Alina Davletova	21–11, 21–14	(gold) Winner
2020	Bulgarian International	(Bulgaria) Stefani Stoeva	(Bulgaria) Maria Delcheva (Bulgaria) Hristomira Popovska	21–8, 21–9	(gold) Winner
2023	Scottish Open	(Bulgaria) Stefani Stoeva	(Japan) Maiko Kawazoe (Japan) Haruna Konishi	19–21, 21–11, 21–12	(gold) Winner
2023	Irish Open	(Bulgaria) Stefani Stoeva	(Denmark) Maiken Fruergaard (Denmark) Sara Thygesen	19–21, 21–17, 22–24	(silver) Runner-up
2023	Bahrain International	(Bulgaria) Stefani Stoeva	(Japan) Kokona Ishikawa (Japan) Mio Konegawa	21–19, 21–14	(gold) Winner
2023	Welsh International	(Bulgaria) Stefani Stoeva	(Denmark) Natasja Anthonisen (Netherlands) Alyssa Tirtosentono	24–22, 21–11	(gold) Winner
2024	Azerbaijan International	(Bulgaria) Stefani Stoeva	(Canada) Catherine Choi (Canada) Josephine Wu	21–14, 21–7	(gold) Winner
2024	Bulgarian International	(Bulgaria) Stefani Stoeva	(Bulgaria) Tanya Ivanova (Bulgaria) Gergana Pavlova	21–5, 21–10	(gold) Winner
2024	Dutch Open	(Bulgaria) Stefani Stoeva	(England) Chloe Birch (England) Estelle van Leeuwen	21–15, 21–18	(gold) Winner
2024 (II)	Bahrain International	(Bulgaria) Stefani Stoeva	(United Arab Emirates) Mysha Omer Khan (United Arab Emirates) Taabia Khan	21–6, 21–8	(gold) Winner
2025	Iran Fajr International	(Bulgaria) Stefani Stoeva	(Turkey) Bengisu Erçetin (Turkey) Nazlıcan İnci	23–21, 21–16	(gold) Winner
2025	Italian Open	(Bulgaria) Stefani Stoeva	(Turkey) Bengisu Erçetin (Turkey) Nazlıcan İnci	21–19, 21–14	(gold) Winner
2025	Belgian International	(Bulgaria) Stefani Stoeva	(Scotland) Julie MacPherson (Scotland) Ciara Torrance	21–14, 21–12	(gold) Winner
2025	Turkey International	(Bulgaria) Stefani Stoeva	(Turkey) Bengisu Erçetin (Turkey) Nazlıcan İnci	21–10, 21–19	(gold) Winner

Mixed doubles
Year	Tournament	Partner	Opponent	Score	Result
2013	Bulgaria Eurasia Open	(Finland) Anton Kaisti	(Germany) Marvin Seidel (Germany) Yvonne Li	19–21, 21–9, 21–18	(gold) Winner
2013	Turkey International	(Finland) Anton Kaisti	(Russia) Vasily Kuznetsov (Russia) Viktoriia Vorobeva	21–9, 21–15	(gold) Winner
2014	Turkey International	(Indonesia) Marcus Fernaldi Gideon	(Germany) Jones Ralfy Jansen (Germany) Cisita Joity Jansen	21–17, 17–21, 12–21	(silver) Runner-up
2024 (I)	Bahrain International	(Bulgaria) Evgeni Panev	(United Arab Emirates) Aakash Ravikumar (United Arab Emirates) Sakshi Kurbkhelgi	21–14, 21–18	(gold) Winner

BWF International Challenge tournament
BWF International Series tournament
BWF Future Series tournament
