= Denmark at the 2023 European Games =

- IOC code: DEN
- NOC: National Olympic Committee and Sports Confederation of Denmark
- Website: www.dif.dk

in Kraków, Poland 21 June 2023 – 2 July 2023
- Competitors: 163 in 16 sports
- Flag bearer: Jonathan Groth (Table Tennis) Line Gyldenløve Kristensen (Beach Handball)
- Medals Ranked 14th: Gold 7 Silver 5 Bronze 5 Total 17

European Games appearances (overview)
- 2015; 2019; 2023; 2027

Denmark competed at the 2023 European Games, in Kraków, Poland from 21 June to 2 July 2023. Denmark had previously competed at the 2015 European Games in Baku, Azerbaijan, where it won 12 medals, including four golds. and competed at the 2019 European Games in Minsk, Belarus, where it won 8 medals, including three golds.

== Medalists ==
Medal	Name	Sport	Event	Date
Gold	Denmark women's national beach handball team	Beach handball	Women's tournament	22 June
Gold	Emma Jørgensen	Canoe sprint	Women's K-1 200 metres	23 June
Gold	Emma Jørgensen	Canoe sprint	Women's K-1 500 metres	24 June
Gold	Edi Hrnic	Taekwondo	Men's 80 kg	25 June
Gold	Kim Astrup; Anders Skaarup Rasmussen	Badminton	Men's doubles	1 July
Gold	Viktor Axelsen	Badminton	Men's singles	2 July
Gold	Nikolai Terteryan	Boxing	Men's 71kg - welterweight	2 July
Silver	Emma Jørgensen; Frederikke Mathiesen	Canoe sprint	Women's K-2 500 metres	23 June
Silver	Magnus Sibbersen; Emma Jørgensen	Canoe sprint	Mixed C-2 200 metres	24 June
Silver	Matthias Fullerton; Tanja Gellenthien	Archery	Mixed team compound	25 June
Silver	Jonas Winterberg Poulsen	Fencing	Men's individual foil	26 June
Silver	Mia Blichfeldt	Badminton	Women's singles	2 July
Bronze	Denmark men's national beach handball team	Beach handball	Men's tournament	22 June
Bronze	Nanna Lind Kristensen	Teqball	Women's singles	29 June
Bronze	Mathias Christiansen; Alexandra Bøje	Badminton	Mixed doubles	1 July
