= Arena Jaskółka Tarnów =

Sports venue in Tarnów, Poland

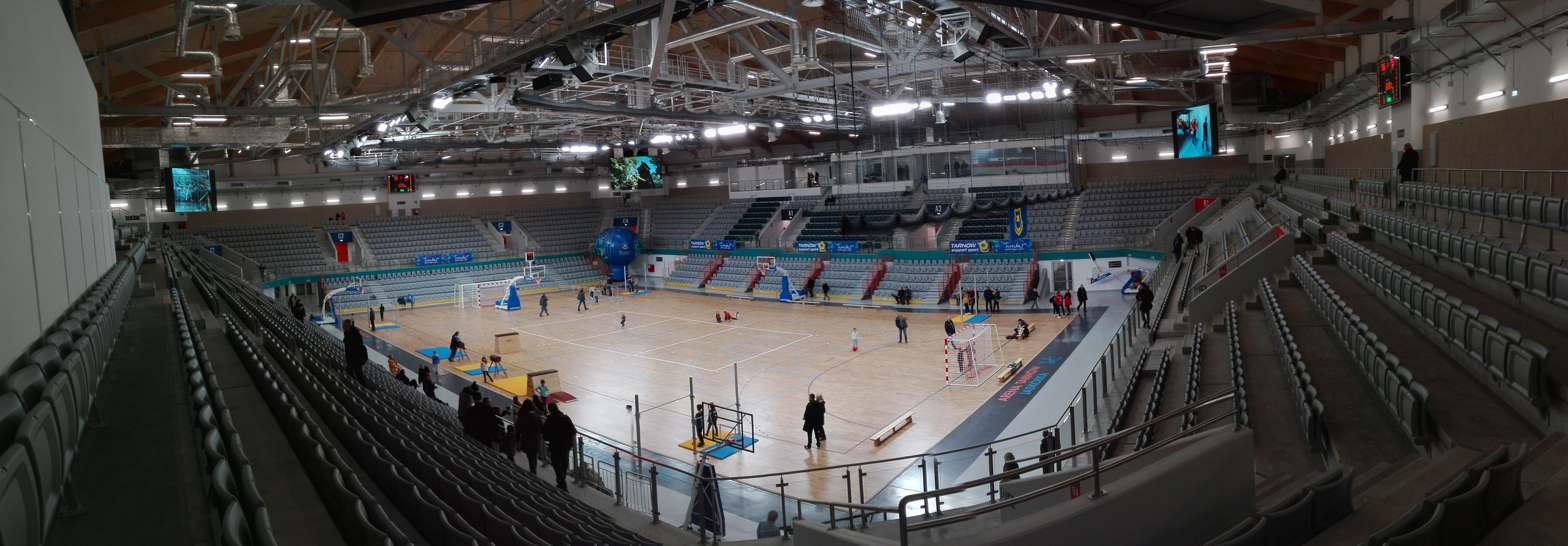
- Interactive map of Arena Jaskółka Tarnów
- Full name: Arena Jaskółka Tarnów
- Location: Tarnów, Poland
- Coordinates: 50°0′32″N 20°55′46″E
- Owner: City of Tarnów
- Capacity: 4,317

Construction
- Built: 1969-1987
- Opened: 1987
- Expanded: 2019

Tenants
- SPR Tarnów (handball); Unia Tarnów (basketball)

Arena Jaskółka Tarnów is an arena in Tarnów, Poland. It is primarily used for handball and basketball. Arena Jaskółka Tarnów holds 4,317 people and hosts the home games of SPR Tarnów and Unia Tarnów.
