= List of world records in shooting sports =

World records in sport shooting

The world records in shooting are ratified by the International Shooting Sport Federation. Shooting records comprise the best performances in the pistol, rifle, and shotgun events. All records are organised according to the latest version of the ISSF rules.

== Men ==
=== Pistol ===
Event	Score	Athlete	Nation	Games	Date	Ref
10 metre air pistol
Qualification	594	Jin Jong-oh	South Korea	2009 Changwon	12 April 2009	
Final	246.5	Kim Song-guk	North Korea	2019 Doha	11 November 2019	
Team	1759	Leonid Ekimov; Vladimir Isakov; Mikhail Nestruev	Russia	2007 Deauville	16 March 2007	
Team	1759	Wang Zhiwei; Pang Wei; Mai Jiajie	China	2014 Kuwait	9 March 2014	
25 meter rapid fire pistol
Qualification	594	Clément Bessaguet	France	2026 Osijek	9 May 2026	
Final	35	Su Lianbofan	China	2026 Munich	29 May 2026	
Final	35	Oliver Geis	Germany	2026 Hangzhou	24 July 2026	
Team	1765	Li Yuehong; Liu Yangpan; Wang Xinjie	China	2023 Hangzhou	25 September 2023	

=== Rifle ===
Event	Score	Athlete	Nation	Games	Date	Ref
10 metre air rifle
Qualification	637.9	Sheng Lihao	China	2023 Baku	12 May 2023	
Final	255.0	Danilo Dennis Sollazzo	Italy	2025 Ningbo	11 September 2025	
Team	1899.0	Ma Sihan; Sheng Lihao; Zhang Changhong	China	2026 Nagoya	21 September 2026	
50 metre rifle three positions
Qualification	598	Tian Jiaming	China	2025 Doha	7 December 2025	
Final	363.0	Zhang Changhong	China	2026 Hangzhou	26 July 2026	
Team	1777	Du Linshu; Tian Jiaming; Yu Hao	China	2023 Changwon	1 November 2023	
50 metre rifle prone
Individual	633.0	Sergey Kamenskiy	Russia	2015 Maribor	21 July 2015	
Team	1881.3	Zhao Wenyu; Liu Yukun; Li Muyuan	China	2025 Cairo	14 November 2025	
300 metre rifle three positions
Individual	594	Péter Sidi	Romania	2025 Chateauroux	2 August 2025	
Team	1770	Pascal Bachmann; Gilles Dufaux; Sandro Greuter	Switzerland	2025 Chateauroux	2 August 2025	
300 metre rifle prone
Individual	600	Harald Stenvaag	Norway	1990 Moscow	15 August 1990	
Individual	600	Bernd Rücker	Germany	1994 Tolmezzo	31 July 1994	
Individual	600	Vebjørn Berg	Norway	2010 Munich	5 August 2010	
Individual	600	Josselin Henry	France	2010 Munich	5 August 2010	
Individual	600	Stefan Raser	Austria	2015 Maribor	27 July 2015	
Individual	600	Karl Olsson	Sweden	2019 Tolmezzo	23 September 2019	
Individual	600	Gernot Rumpler	Austria	2021 Osijek	2 June 2021	
Individual	600	Rajmond Debevec	Slovenia	2023 Baku	27 August 2023	
Team	1796	Karl Olsson; Per Sandberg; Johan Gustafsson	Sweden	2019 Tolmezzo	23 September 2019	
300 metre standard rifle
Individual	591	Bernhard Pickl	Austria	2019 Tolmezzo	25 September 2019	
Individual	591	Steffen Olsen	Denmark	2022 Cairo	25 October 2022	
Team	1765	Hans Kristian Wear; Kim Andre Lund; Simon Claussen	Norway	2019 Tolmezzo	24 September 2019	

== Women ==
=== Pistol ===
Senior

Event	Score	Athlete	Nation	Games	Date	Ref
10 metre air pistol
Qualification	591	Jiang Ranxin	China	2022 Cairo	15 October 2022	
Final	246.9	Zorana Arunović	Serbia	2017 Maribor	11 March 2017	
Team	1904.2		China	2026 Nagoya	20 September 2026	
25 metre pistol
Qualification	595	Rhythm Sangwan	India	2023 Baku	13 May 2023	
Final	43	Esha Singh	India	2026 Munich	27 May 2026	
Team	1768	Chen Ying; Li Duihong; Tao Luna	China	2002 Busan	4 October 2002	
25 metre standard pistol
Individual	575	Xiao Jiaruixuan	China	2022 Cairo	19 October 2022	
Team	1693	Yao Qianxun; Sun Yujie; Chen Jia	China	2025 Cairo	15 November 2025	

Junior

Event	Score	Athlete	Nation	Games	Date	Ref
10 metre air pistol
Qualification	589	Yao Qianxun	China	2022 Cairo	13 June 2025	
Final	245.1	Suruchi Singh	India	2025 Doha	6 December 2025	
Team	1740	Yao Qianxun; Ma Qianke; Zeng Zhuwenxi	China	2025 Shymkent	19 August 2025	
25 metre pistol
Qualification	595	Rhythm Sangwan	India	2023 Baku	13 May 2023	
Final	43	Esha Singh	India	2026 Munich	27 May 2026	
Team	1759	Manu Bhaker; Esha Singh; Rhythm Sangwan	India	2002 Busan	4 October 2002	
25 metre standard pistol
Individual	580	Feng Sixuan	China	2022 Cairo	15 October 2022	
Team	1666	Yao Qianxun; Sun Yujie; Chen Jia	China	2019 Suhl	13 July 2019	

=== Rifle ===
Senior

Event	Score	Athlete	Nation	Games	Date	Ref
10 metre air rifle
Qualification	637.9	Wang Zifei	China	2025 Munich	10 June 2025	
Final	255.3	Peng Xinlu	China	2025 Ningbo	14 September 2025	
Team	1904.2	Wang Zifei; Han Jiayu; Du Yuchen	China	2026 Aichi-Nagoya	20 September 2026	

Junior

Event	Score	Athlete	Nation	Games	Date	Ref
10 metre air rifle
Qualification	637.9	Wang Zifei	China	2025 Munich	10 June 2025	
Final	255.3	Peng Xinlu	China	2025 Ningbo	14 September 2025	
Team	1740	Liu Yafei; Peng Xinlu; Zhang Liyuan	China	2025 Shymkent	22 August 2025	

== Mixed ==
=== Pistol ===
Event	Score	Athlete	Nation	Games	Date	Ref
10 metre air pistol mixed team
Qualification	587	Manu Bhaker; Saurabh Chaudhary	India	2021 Osijek	26 June 2021	
Qualification	587	Jiang Ranxin; Xie Yu	China	2024 Munich	6 June 2024	
25 metre rapid fire pistol mixed team
Qualification	580	Kim Jang-mi; Han Dae-yoon	South Korea	2022 Changwon	19 July 2022	
25 metre standard pistol mixed team
Qualification	574	Monika Karsch; Christian Reitz	Germany	2019 Bologna	22 September 2019	
50 metre pistol mixed team
Qualification	546	Jiang Ranxin; Zhang Bowen	China	2022 Cairo	24 October 2022	

=== Rifle ===
Event	Score	Athlete	Nation	Games	Date	Ref
10 metre air rifle mixed team
Qualification	636.9	Wang Zifei; Sheng Lihao	China	2026 Aichi-Nagoya	22 September 2026	
Final	507.1	Wang Zifei; Sheng Lihao	China	2026 Aichi-Nagoya	22 September 2026	
50 metre rifle three positions mixed team
Qualification	889	Sheileen Waibel; Gernot Rumpler	Austria	2021 Osijek	31 May 2021	
Qualification	889	Jeanette Hegg Duestad; Jon-Hermann Hegg	Norway	2022 Rio de Janeiro	17 April 2022	
50 metre rifle prone mixed team
Qualification	1249.7	Chiara Leone; Jan Lochbihler	Switzerland	2023 Baku	23 August 2023	
300 metre rifle three positions mixed team
Qualification	884	Karolina Kowalczyk; Tomasz Bartnik	Poland	2022 Cairo	26 October 2022	
300 metre rifle prone mixed team
Qualification	597	Silvia Guignard; Gilles Dufaux	Switzerland	2022 Zagreb	30 July 2022	

=== Shotgun ===
Event	Score	Athlete	Nation	Games	Date	Ref
Trap mixed team
Qualification	149	Kayle Browning; Brian Burrows	United States	2019 Acapulco	20 March 2019	
Qualification	149	Safiye Sarıtürk; Tolga Tuncer	Turkey	2019 Acapulco	20 March 2019	
Qualification	149	Penny Smith; Mitchell Iles-Crevatin	Australia	2019 Acapulco	20 March 2019	
Final						
Skeet mixed team
Qualification	149	Austen Smith; Vincent Hancock	United States	2023 Baku	20 August 2023	
Qualification	149	Eman Al-Shamaa; Abdullah Al-Rashidi	Kuwait	2023 Hangzhou	28 September 2023	
Qualification	149	Kimberly Rhode; Vincent Hancock	United States	2024 Rabat	12 February 2024	
Qualification	149	Diana Bacosi; Gabriele Rossetti	Italy	2024 Paris	5 August 2024	
Final	52	Jiang Yiting; Lyu Jianlin	China	2026 Aichi-Nagoya	24 September 2026	

=== Target ===
Event	Score	Athlete	Nation	Games	Date	Ref
10 metre moving target mixed team
Qualification	386	Halina Avramenko; Denys Babliuk	Ukraine	2024 Plzeň	31 August 2024	
