= Shooting at the 2026 Asian Games – Men's 50 metre rifle three positions =

Men's 50 metre rifle 3 positions at the 2026 Asian Games
- Venue: Aichi Pref. General Shooting Gallery
- Dates: 25 September 2026
- Competitors: 40 from 15 nations

Medalists
gold medal	Liu Yukun	China
silver medal	Zhang Changhong	China
bronze medal	Islam Satpayev	Kazakhstan

The men's 50 metre rifle three positions competition at the 2026 Asian Games in Aichi-Nagoya, Japan was held on 25 September 2026 at Aichi Pref. General Shooting Gallery.

== Schedule ==
All times are Japan Standard Time (UTC+09:00)

Date	Time	Event
Friday, 25 September 2026	10:45	Qualification
Friday, 25 September 2026	14:00	Final

== Records ==
Prior to this competition, the existing world, Asian and Games records were as follows.

Qualification
World Record	Tian Jiaming (CHN)	598	Doha, Qatar	7 December 2025
Asian Record	Du Linshu (CHN)	597	Changwon, South Korea	1 November 2023
Games Record	Aishwary Pratap Singh Tomar (IND)	591	Hangzhou, China	29 September 2023
Final
World Record	Zhang Changhong (CHN)	363.0	Hangzhou, China	26 July 2026
Asian Record	Aishwary Pratap Singh Tomar (IND)	362.0	New Delhi, India	12 February 2026
Games Record	—	—	—	—

== Results ==
Legend

- DNS — Did not start
- Q — Qualified for the final
- QGR — Qualification Asian Games Record
- QWR — Qualification World Record
- QAsR — Qualification Asian Record
- GR — Asian Games Record

=== Qualification ===
Rank	Athlete	Kneeling		Prone		Standing		Total	Xs	Notes
Rank	Athlete	1	2	1	2	1	2	Total	Xs	Notes
1	Zhang Changhong (CHN)	99	100	99	100	99	96	593	34	GR
2	Joung Seung-woo (KOR)	100	99	99	99	97	98	592	38	
3	Aishwary Pratap Singh Tomar (IND)	100	99	99	99	97	95	589	34	
4	Niraj Kumar (IND)	96	97	99	99	97	100	588	34	
5	Liu Yukun (CHN)	98	98	99	99	96	98	588	34	
6	Batbayar Erkhembayar (MGL)	97	100	99	99	95	97	587	29	
7	Sheng Lihao (CHN)	100	96	97	98	95	99	585	27	
8	Naoya Okada (JPN)	97	99	97	99	96	97	585	26	
9	Rudrankksh Patil (IND)	98	97	99	98	97	96	585	26	
10	Islam Satpayev (KAZ)	98	99	100	98	92	97	584	34	
11	Kento Koseki (JPN)	97	97	98	100	93	98	583	31	
12	Bayaraa Nyantai (MGL)	96	94	98	100	97	98	583	29	
13	Konstantin Malinovskiy (KAZ)	95	98	98	99	96	97	583	27	
14	Amirmohammad Nekounam (IRI)	96	98	98	98	94	98	582	29	
15	Napis Tortungpanich (THA)	97	96	99	99	95	96	582	29	
16	Naoki Hanakawa (JPN)	99	95	99	97	94	98	582	24	
17	Park Sung-hyun (KOR)	95	93	98	97	99	98	580	27	
18	Javohir Sokhibov (UZB)	96	95	98	97	95	98	579	24	
19	Gwon Hyeopjun (KOR)	98	98	94	96	98	95	579	22	
20	Nikita Shakhtorin (KAZ)	95	96	97	98	98	95	579	18	
21	Hamed Said Al Khatri (OMA)	98	99	96	97	96	92	578	25	
22	Fathur Gustafian (INA)	96	95	99	98	93	97	578	24	
23	Abdullah Hel Baki (BAN)	95	98	97	94	97	96	577	26	
24	Pourya Norouziyan (IRI)	96	94	98	95	97	96	576	22	
25	Thongphaphum Vongsukdee (THA)	92	97	98	100	94	94	575	25	
26	Phung Viet Dung (VIE)	95	96	97	98	96	93	575	19	
27	Kanurian Al Ghozi (INA)	96	92	96	95	96	98	573	26	
28	Abdulrahman Saad AljuhayDili (KSA)	95	98	100	98	91	90	572	25	
29	Nguyen Minh Quang (VIE)	96	96	93	96	93	98	572	18	
30	Nguyen Tam Quang (VIE)	91	95	98	96	94	96	570	18	
31	Hadi Gharebaghi (IRI)	92	95	98	96	93	95	569	17	
32	Abdullah Zain M Alsunaidi (QAT)	93	93	96	97	95	94	568	20	
33	Sainkhuu Enkhtuvshin (MGL)	94	95	96	97	93	93	568	20	
34	Md Robiul Islam (BAN)	92	92	94	99	95	95	567	16	
35	Md Yeausub Ali (BAN)	95	92	97	94	94	95	567	16	
36	Patsugree Sriwichai (THA)	94	98	95	96	91	93	567	12	
37	Davin Rosyiid Wibowo (INA)	95	95	95	93	94	93	565	15	
38	Khalid Abdulrahman A H Q Sharshani (QAT)	91	94	93	92	95	96	561	18	
39	Jayson Valdez (PHI)	94	93	94	93	97	90	561	14	
—	Muhammad Uzman (PAK)							DNS		

=== Final ===
Rank	Athlete	Kneeling	Prone	Standing – Elimination						Notes
Rank	Athlete	Kneeling	Prone	1	2	3	4	5	6	Notes
1st place, gold medalist(s)	Liu Yukun (CHN)	103.3	208.5	308.8	319.5	330.2	339.8	349.8	360.5	GR
2nd place, silver medalist(s)	Zhang Changhong (CHN)	102.3	206.2	309.7	319.3	330.1	340.4	350.5	360.2	
3rd place, bronze medalist(s)	Islam Satpayev (KAZ)	101.7	206.4	308.0	318.7	329.2	338.8	348.3		
4	Batbayar Erkhembayar (MGL)	103.9	208.3	310.1	318.9	329.1	336.8			
5	Aishwary Pratap Singh Tomar (IND)	102.9	205.3	306.5	317.2	327.6				
6	Naoya Okada (JPN)	101.3	203.0	305.0	313.8					
7	Joung Seung-woo (KOR)	101.8	205.6	304.2						
8	Niraj Kumar (IND)	97.1	200.9	299.0						
