= Shooting at the 2024 Summer Olympics – Men's 50 metre rifle three positions =

Olympic shooting event

Men's 50 metre rifle three positions at the Games of the XXXIII Olympiad
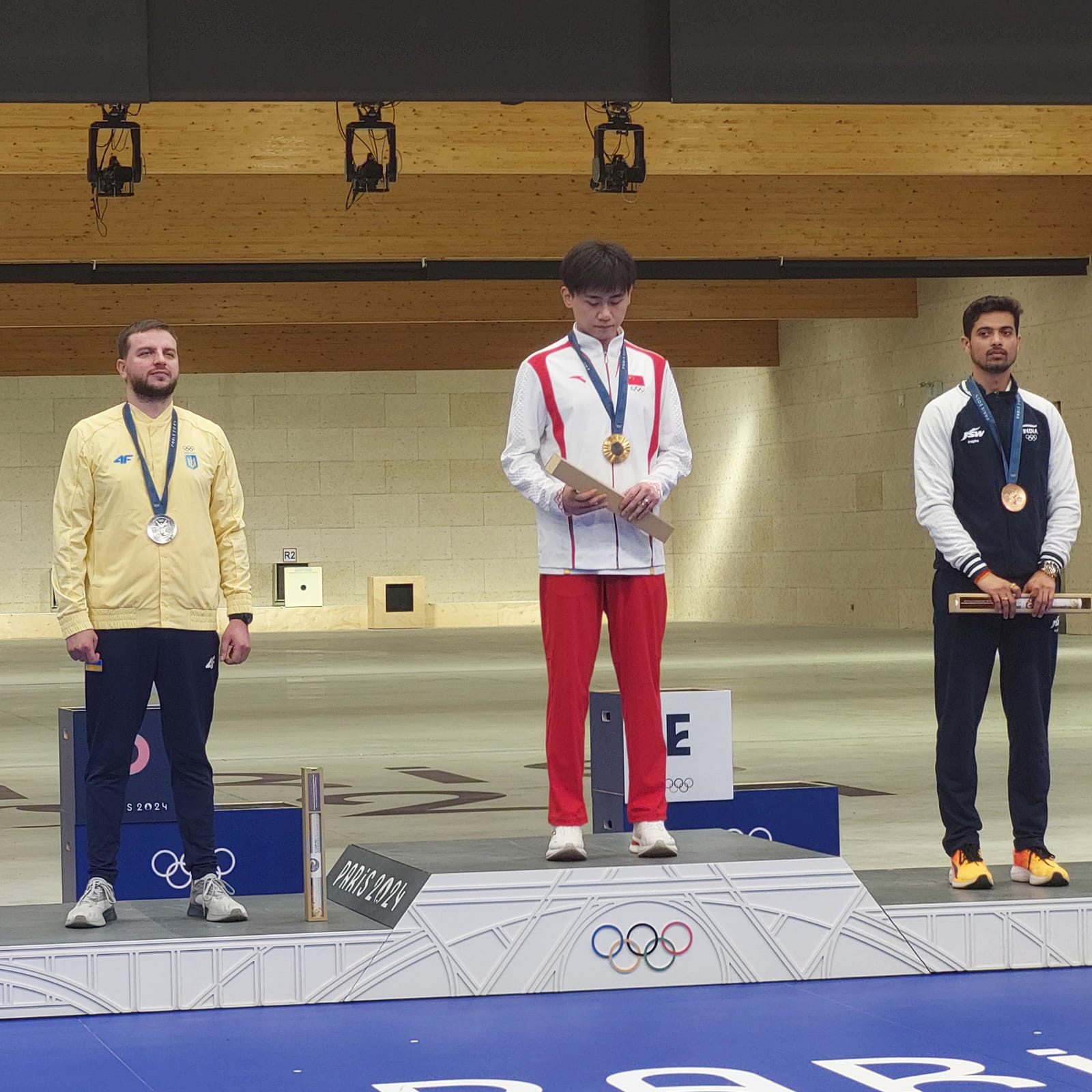
- Venue: National Shooting Center, Châteauroux
- Dates: 31 July 2024
- Competitors: 44 from 30 nations

Medalists
1st place, gold medalist(s)		Liu Yukun	China
2nd place, silver medalist(s)		Serhiy Kulish	Ukraine
3rd place, bronze medalist(s)		Swapnil Kusale	India

The men's 50 metre rifle three positions event at the 2024 Summer Olympics took place on 31 July 2024 at the National Shooting Center, Châteauroux in France.

== Records ==
Prior to this competition, the existing world and Olympic records were as follows:

Qualifying records
World record	Jan Lochbihler (SUI)	1188	Rio de Janeiro, Brazil	28 August 2019
Olympic record	Sergey Kamenskiy (RUS)	1184	Rio de Janeiro, Brazil	14 August 2016

Final records
World record	Liu Yukun (CHN)	468.9	Baku, Azerbaijan	10 May 2024
Olympic record	Zhang Changhong (CHN)	466.0	Tokyo, Japan	2 August 2021

== Schedule ==
All times are Central European Summer Time (UTC+2)

Date	Time	Round
Wednesday, 31 July 2024	09:00	Qualification
Thursday, 1 August 2024	09:30	Final

== Results ==
=== Qualification ===
Rank	Athlete	Country	Kneeling	Prone	Standing	Total	Notes
1	Liu Yukun	China	199	197	198	594-38x	Q
2	Jon-Hermann Hegg	Norway	198	198	197	593-36x	Q
3	Serhiy Kulish	Ukraine	199	199	194	592-39x	Q
4	Lucas Kryzs	France	199	199	194	592-35x	Q
5	Lazar Kovačević	Serbia	199	198	195	592-33x	Q
6	Tomasz Bartnik	Poland	195	199	197	591-40x	Q
7	Swapnil Kusale	India	198	197	195	590-38x	Q
8	Jiří Přívratský	Czech Republic	195	199	196	590-35x	Q
9	Petr Nymburský	Czech Republic	196	199	195	590-32x	
10	Patrik Jány	Slovakia	194	199	196	589-34x	
11	Aishwary Pratap Singh Tomar	India	197	199	193	589-33x	
12	Marcus Madsen	Sweden	198	196	195	589-26x	
13	Victor Lindgren	Sweden	197	194	198	589-25x	
14	Edoardo Bonazzi	Italy	195	197	196	588-38x	
15	Romain Aufrère	France	194	197	197	588-34x	
16	Du Linshu	China	198	198	192	588-33x	
17	Maximilian Ulbrich	Germany	195	198	195	588-25x	
18	Islam Satpayev	Kazakhstan	196	197	195	588-24x	
19	Danilo Sollazzo	Italy	197	198	192	587-33x	
20	Ivan Roe	United States	198	197	192	587-32x	
21	István Péni	Hungary	193	200	194	587-28x	
22	Christoph Dürr	Switzerland	196	200	190	586-32x	
23	Ole Martin Halvorsen	Norway	196	200	190	586-32x	
24	Aleksi Leppa	Finland	195	198	193	586-31x	
25	Konstantin Malinovskiy	Kazakhstan	197	196	193	586-29x	
26	Miran Maričić	Croatia	194	198	193	585-31x	
27	Jack Rossiter	Australia	195	199	191	585-27x	
28	Alexander Schmirl	Austria	193	199	193	585-26x	
29	Michael Bargeron	Great Britain	196	197	191	584-28x	
30	Nyantaigiin Bayaraa	Mongolia	194	197	193	584-26x	
31	Petar Gorša	Croatia	195	197	191	583-32x	
32	Zalán Pekler	Hungary	194	195	193	582-32x	
33	Naoya Okada	Japan	195	196	191	582-26x	
34	Dane Sampson	Australia	193	197	191	581-27x	
35	Andreas Thum	Austria	191	198	191	580-24x	
36	Carlos Quezada	Mexico	194	195	193	579-27x	
37	Maciej Kowalewicz	Poland	191	197	191	579-26x	
38	Rylan Kissell	United States	196	192	191	579-25x	
39	Thongphaphum Vongsukdee	Thailand	194	193	191	578-25x	
40	Israel Gutierrez	El Salvador	189	197	190	576-20x	
41	Ibrahim Korayiem	Egypt	194	196	186	576-17x	
42	Tye Ikeda	Canada	190	195	192	575-26x	
43	Fathur Gustafian	Indonesia	192	193	189	574-19x	
44	Park Ha-jun	South Korea	185	196	191	572-23x	

=== Final ===
Rank	Athlete	Series													Total
Rank	Athlete	Kneeling			Prone			Standing							Total
Rank	Athlete	1	2	3	4	5	6	7	8	9s41	9s42	9s43	9s44	9s45	Total
1st place, gold medalist(s)	Liu Yukun (CHN)	51.3	102.9	154.0	206.9	259.2	311.5	362.8	412.5	422.9	432.6	442.8	453.7	463.6	463.6
2nd place, silver medalist(s)	Serhiy Kulish (UKR)	50.8	102.7	153.9	206.7	258.7	311.1	361.3	412.6	423.0	432.9	442.0	451.9	461.3	461.3
3rd place, bronze medalist(s)	Swapnil Kusale (IND)	50.8	101.7	153.3	206.0	258.2	310.1	361.2	411.6	422.1	431.5	441.4	451.4	—N/a	451.4
4	Jiří Přívratský (CZE)	51.3	101.5	153.5	206.4	259.2	311.0	359.7	409.5	419.9	430.4	440.7	—N/a		440.7
5	Jon-Hermann Hegg (NOR)	52.1	103.7	155.3	207.8	259.6	312.1	361.6	410.5	420.3	430.2	—N/a			430.2
6	Lucas Kryzs (FRA)	52.3	102.1	153.7	205.6	257.5	308.8	358.5	409.0	418.9	—N/a				418.9
7	Tomasz Bartnik (POL)	52.0	102.1	152.9	205.5	256.8	308.8	357.9	408.8	—N/a					408.8
8	Lazar Kovačević (SRB)	49.7	101.5	152.3	204.5	257.1	307.9	357.7	407.4	—N/a					407.4
