= Shooting at the 2024 Summer Olympics – Mixed 10 metre air rifle team =

Châteauroux, France

Mixed 10 metre air rifle team at the Games of the XXXIII Olympiad
- Venue: National Shooting Centre, Châteauroux
- Dates: 27 July
- Competitors: 56 from 19 nations
- Teams: 28

Medalists
1st place, gold medalist(s)		Huang Yuting; Sheng Lihao	China
2nd place, silver medalist(s)		Keum Ji-hyeon; Park Ha-jun	South Korea
3rd place, bronze medalist(s)		Alexandra Le; Islam Satpayev	Kazakhstan

The Mixed 10 meter air rifle team event at the 2024 Summer Olympics took place on 27 July 2024 at the National Shooting Centre in Châteauroux, France.

== Records ==
Prior to this competition, the existing world and Olympic records were as follows:

Qualification records
World record	Narmada Raju / Rudrankksh Patil (IND)	635.8	Cairo, Egypt	20 February 2023
Olympic record	Yang Qian / Yang Haoran (CHN)	633.2	Tokyo, Japan	27 July 2021

== Schedule ==
All times are Central European Summer Time (UTC+2)

Date	Time	Round
Saturday, 27 July 2024	09:00	Qualification
Saturday, 27 July 2024	10:30	Medal matches

== Results ==
=== Qualification ===
Rank	Athletes	Nation	Series			Total	Notes
Rank	Athletes	Nation	1	2	3	Total	Notes
1	Huang Yuting	China 1	105.9	105.0	106.1	632.2	QG
1	Sheng Lihao	China 1	104.6	105.0	105.6	632.2	QG
2	Keum Ji-hyeon	South Korea 1	105.7	106.0	104.5	631.4	QG
2	Park Ha-jun	South Korea 1	105.4	104.2	105.6	631.4	QG
3	Alexandra Le	Kazakhstan 1	104.4	105.0	103.7	630.8	QB
3	Islam Satpayev	Kazakhstan 1	105.4	105.7	106.6	630.8	QB
4	Anna Janssen	Germany	105.7	105.0	106.2	629.7	QB
4	Maximilian Ulbrich	Germany	103.5	104.4	104.9	629.7	QB
5	Jeanette Hegg Duestad	Norway 1	103.2	106.1	106.1	629.6	
5	Jon-Hermann Hegg	Norway 1	106.1	103.8	104.3	629.6	
6	Ramita Jindal	India 2	104.6	104.4	105.5	628.7	
6	Arjun Babuta	India 2	104.1	106.2	103.9	628.7	
7	Goretti Zumaya	Mexico	104.1	104.8	105.2	628.6	
7	Edson Ramírez	Mexico	104.4	105.1	105.0	628.6	
8	Han Jiayu	China 2	106.0	104.3	104.1	628.5	
8	Du Linshu	China 2	105.9	102.7	105.5	628.5	
9	Manon Herbulot	France 2	105.9	105.3	104.2	627.4	
9	Romain Aufrère	France 2	104.9	104.0	103.1	627.4	
10	Aneta Stankiewicz	Poland 1	103.8	104.8	105.5	626.9	
10	Tomasz Bartnik	Poland 1	105.2	103.4	104.2	626.9	
11	Mai Magdy Elsayed	Egypt 1	105.5	103.4	103.6	626.3	
11	Mohamed Abdelkader	Egypt 1	104.2	104.3	105.3	626.3	
12	Elavenil Valarivan	India 1	103.4	104.7	104.5	626.3	
12	Sandeep Singh	India 1	104.1	105.3	104.3	626.3	
13	Mary Tucker	United States 2	103.4	104.4	105.0	626.0	
13	Rylan Kissell	United States 2	105.4	104.9	102.9	626.0	
14	Océanne Muller	France 1	103.1	102.9	107.0	625.8	
14	Lucas Kryzs	France 1	105.7	102.7	104.4	625.8	
15	Nadine Ungerank	Austria 1	103.8	104.2	104.3	625.5	
15	Martin Strempfl	Austria 1	103.9	105.0	104.3	625.5	
16	Oyuunbatyn Yesügen	Mongolia	105.4	103.8	104.9	625.4	
16	Nyantain Bayaraa	Mongolia	102.8	104.6	103.9	625.4	
17	Barbara Gambaro	Italy	104.3	105.2	103.8	625.4	
17	Danilo Sollazzo	Italy	103.7	104.2	104.2	625.4	
18	Sagen Maddalena	United States 1	103.5	106.0	105.1	624.9	
18	Ivan Roe	United States 1	103.5	103.3	103.5	624.9	
19	Fernanda Russo	Argentina	104.2	103.7	103.0	624.8	
19	Marcelo Gutiérrez	Argentina	104.4	104.8	104.7	624.8	
20	Eszter Mészáros	Hungary	103.6	103.6	103.2	624.7	
20	István Péni	Hungary	105.1	104.4	104.8	624.7	
21	Synnøve Berg	Norway 2	105.2	104.2	105.3	623.8	
21	Ole Martin Halvorsen	Norway 2	102.1	103.4	103.6	623.8	
22	Ban Hyo-jin	South Korea 2	103.9	105.3	104.4	623.7	
22	Choe Dae-han	South Korea 2	102.6	104.0	103.5	623.7	
23	Julia Piotrowska	Poland 2	102.9	104.6	103.9	623.7	
23	Maciej Kowalewicz	Poland 2	104.6	104.9	102.8	623.7	
24	Veronika Blažíčková	Czech Republic	103.4	104.9	102.9	623.6	
24	Jiří Přívratský	Czech Republic	103.8	104.4	104.2	623.6	
25	Misaki Nobata	Japan	104.5	104.2	103.0	623.6	
25	Naoya Okada	Japan	104.8	103.7	103.4	623.6	
26	Seonaid McIntosh	Great Britain	103.5	104.7	104.5	622.1	
26	Michael Bargeron	Great Britain	102.7	103.5	103.2	622.1	
27	Arina Altukhova	Kazakhstan 2	103.8	104.9	102.6	621.3	
27	Konstantin Malinovskiy	Kazakhstan 2	104.2	103.2	102.6	621.3	
28	Remas Khalil	Egypt 2	104.3	103.1	103.9	620.6	
28	Ibrahim Korayiem	Egypt 2	102.7	103.3	103.3	620.6	

=== Final ===
Rank	Team	Nation	Total
Gold medal match
1st place, gold medalist(s)	Huang Yuting; Sheng Lihao	China 1	16
2nd place, silver medalist(s)	Keum Ji-hyeon; Park Ha-jun	South Korea 1	12
Bronze medal match
3rd place, bronze medalist(s)	Alexandra Le; Islam Satpayev	Kazakhstan 1	17
4	Anna Janssen; Maximilian Ulbrich	Germany	5
