= Shooting at the 2026 Asian Games – Men's 50 metre rifle three positions team =

Men's 50 metre rifle 3 positions team at the 2026 Asian Games
- Venue: Aichi Pref. General Shooting Gallery
- Dates: 25 September 2026
- Competitors: 33 from 11 nations

Medalists
gold medal	China; Zhang Changhong, Sheng Lihao, Liu Yukun
silver medal	India; Aishwary Pratap Singh Tomar, Rudrankksh Patil, Niraj Kumar
bronze medal	South Korea; Park Sung-hyun, Joung Seungwoo, Gwon Hyeopjun

The men's 50 metre rifle three positions team competition at the 2026 Asian Games in Aichi-Nagoya, Japan was held on 25 September 2026 at Aichi Pref. General Shooting Gallery.

== Schedule ==
All times are Japan Standard Time (UTC+09:00)

Date	Time	Event
Friday, 25 September 2026	10:45	Final

== Records ==
Prior to this competition, the existing world, Asian and Games records were as follows.

World Record	Du Linshu, Tian Jiaming and Yu Hao (CHN)	1777	Changwon, South Korea	1 November 2023
Asian Record	Du Linshu, Tian Jiaming and Yu Hao (CHN)	1777	Changwon, South Korea	1 November 2023
Games Record	Swapnil Kusale, Aishwary Pratap Singh Tomar and Akhil Sheoran (IND)	1769	Hangzhou, China	29 September 2023

== Results ==
Rank	Team	Kneeling		Prone		Standing		Total	Xs	Notes
Rank	Team	1	2	1	2	1	2	Total	Xs	Notes
1st place, gold medalist(s)	China (CHN)	297	294	295	297	290	293	1766	95	
	Zhang Changhong	99	100	99	100	99	96	593	34	
	Sheng Lihao	100	96	97	98	95	99	585	27	
	Liu Yukun	98	98	99	99	96	98	588	34	
2nd place, silver medalist(s)	India (IND)	294	293	297	296	291	291	1762	94	
	Aishwary Pratap Singh Tomar	100	99	99	99	97	95	589	34	
	Rudrankksh Patil	98	97	99	98	97	96	585	26	
	Niraj Kumar	96	97	99	99	97	100	588	34	
3rd place, bronze medalist(s)	South Korea (KOR)	293	290	291	292	294	291	1751	87	
	Park Sung-hyun	95	93	98	97	99	98	580	27	
	Joung Seung-woo	100	99	99	99	97	98	592	38	
	Gwon Hyeop-jun	98	98	94	96	98	95	579	22	
4	Japan (JPN)	293	291	294	296	283	293	1750	81	
	Naoya Okada	97	99	97	99	96	97	585	26	
	Kento Koseki	97	97	98	100	93	98	583	31	
	Naoki Hanakawa	99	95	99	97	94	98	582	24	
5	Kazakhstan (KAZ)	288	293	295	295	286	289	1746	79	
	Nikita Shakhtorin	95	96	97	98	98	95	579	18	
	Islam Satpayev	98	99	100	98	92	97	584	34	
	Konstantin Malinovskiy	95	98	98	99	96	97	583	27	
6	Mongolia (MGL)	287	289	293	296	285	288	1738	78	
	Bayaraa Nyantai	96	94	98	100	97	98	583	29	
	Sainkhuu Enkhtuvshin	94	95	96	97	93	93	568	20	
	Batbayar Erkhembayar	97	100	99	99	95	97	587	29	
7	Iran (IRI)	284	287	294	289	284	289	1727	68	
	Pourya Norouziyan	96	94	98	95	97	96	576	22	
	Amirmohammad Nekounam	96	98	98	98	94	98	582	29	
	Hadi Gharebaghi	92	95	98	96	93	95	569	17	
8	Thailand (THA)	283	291	292	295	280	283	1724	66	
	Thongphaphum Vongsukdee	92	97	98	100	94	94	575	25	
	Napis Tortungpanich	97	96	99	99	95	96	582	29	
	Patsugree Sriwichai	94	98	95	96	91	93	567	12	
9	Vietnam (VIE)	282	287	288	290	283	287	1717	55	
	Phung Viet Dung	95	96	97	98	96	93	575	19	
	Nguyen Tam Quang	91	95	98	96	94	96	570	18	
	Nguyen Minh Quang	96	96	93	96	93	98	572	18	
10	Indonesia (INA)	287	282	290	286	283	288	1716	65	
	Davin Rosyiid Wibowo	95	95	95	93	94	93	565	15	
	Fathur Gustafian	96	95	99	98	93	97	578	24	
	Kanurian Al Ghozi	96	92	96	95	96	98	573	26	
11	Bangladesh (BAN)	282	282	288	287	286	286	1711	58	
	Md Robiul Islam	92	92	94	99	95	95	567	16	
	Abdullah Hel Baki	95	98	97	94	97	96	577	26	
	Md Yeausub Ali	95	92	97	94	94	95	567	16	
