= Shooting at the 2026 Asian Games – Mixed 10 metre air rifle team =

Mixed 10 metre air rifle team at the 2026 Asian Games
- Venue: Aichi Pref. General Shooting Gallery
- Dates: 22 September 2026
- Competitors: 40 from 20 nations

Medalists
| gold medal | Sheng Lihao; Wang Zifei | China |
| silver medal | Park Hajun; Ban Hyojin | South Korea |
| bronze medal | Naoki Hanakawa; Misaki Nobata | Japan |

The mixed 10 metre air rifle team competition at the 2026 Asian Games in Nagoya, Japan was held on 22 September 2026 at the Aichi Prefectural General Shooting Gallery.

== Schedule ==
All times are Japan Standard Time (UTC+09:00)

| Date | Time | Event |
|---|---|---|
| Tuesday, 22 September 2026 | 09:00 | Qualification |
| Tuesday, 22 September 2026 | 11:35 | Final Match |

== Records ==
Prior to this competition, the existing world, Asian, and Games records were as follows:

=== Qualification records ===
Prior to this competition, the existing world, Asian and Games records were as follows.

| World Record | China | 636.9 | Ningbo, China | 8 September 2025 |
| Asian Record | China | 634.4 | Hangzhou, China | 25 September 2023 |
| Games Record | China | 634.4 | Hangzhou, China | 25 September 2023 |

=== Final records ===
Prior to this competition, the existing world, Asian and Games records were as follows.

| World Record | Norway | 506.7 | Yerevan, Armenia | 28 February 2026 |
| Asian Record | India | 505.0 | New Delhi, India | 7 February 2026 |
| Games Record | — | — | — | — |

== Results ==
=== Qualification ===
| Rank | Team | Series | | | Total | Notes |
| Rank | Team | 1 | 2 | 3 | Total | Notes |
|---|---|---|---|---|---|---|
| 1 | China (CHN) | 211.7 | 213.8 | 213.4 | 638.9 | Q, WR |
| | Wang Zifei | 105.9 | 106.5 | 107.2 | 319.6 | |
| | Sheng Lihao | 105.8 | 107.3 | 106.2 | 319.3 | |
| 2 | India (IND) | 211.9 | 211.3 | 211.4 | 634.6 | Q |
| | Elavenil Valarivan | 105.8 | 106.8 | 106.7 | 319.3 | |
| | Parth Rakesh Mane | 106.1 | 104.5 | 104.7 | 315.3 | |
| 3 | South Korea (KOR) | 211.1 | 211.9 | 210.2 | 633.2 | Q |
| | Ban Hyo-jin | 106.3 | 106.9 | 105.4 | 318.6 | |
| | Park Ha-jun | 104.8 | 105.0 | 104.8 | 314.6 | |
| 4 | Japan (JPN) | 209.6 | 210.0 | 211.8 | 631.4 | Q |
| | Misaki Nobata | 104.6 | 104.6 | 105.7 | 314.9 | |
| | Naoki Hanakawa | 105.0 | 105.4 | 106.1 | 316.5 | |
| 5 | Kazakhstan (KAZ) | 208.5 | 209.1 | 211.5 | 629.1 | |
| | Alexandra Le | 103.9 | 104.4 | 105.6 | 313.9 | |
| | Islam Satpayev | 104.6 | 104.7 | 105.9 | 315.2 | |
| 6 | Oman (OMA) | 208.7 | 209.7 | 209.9 | 628.3 | |
| | Al Anoud Al Khalili | 104.2 | 104.4 | 104.9 | 313.5 | |
| | Khalid Al Kalbani | 104.5 | 105.3 | 105.0 | 314.8 | |
| 7 | Indonesia (INA) | 209.0 | 209.4 | 208.5 | 626.9 | |
| | Dominique Rachmawati Karini | 104.2 | 104.6 | 104.4 | 313.2 | |
| | Fathur Gustafian | 104.8 | 104.8 | 104.1 | 313.7 | |
| 8 | Uzbekistan (UZB) | 207.3 | 207.9 | 209.5 | 624.7 | |
| | Mukhtasar Tokhirova | 103.1 | 104.6 | 103.9 | 311.6 | |
| | Javohir Sokhibov | 104.2 | 103.3 | 105.6 | 313.1 | |
| 9 | Mongolia (MGL) | 208.1 | 207.0 | 209.3 | 624.4 | |
| | Yesugen Oyunbat | 104.5 | 103.4 | 104.4 | 312.3 | |
| | Erkhembayar Batbayar | 103.6 | 103.6 | 104.9 | 312.1 | |
| 10 | Qatar (QAT) | 206.3 | 206.8 | 208.5 | 621.6 | |
| | Retaj Alyafei | 104.2 | 105.5 | 104.8 | 314.5 | |
| | Abdullah Zain M Alsunaidi | 102.1 | 101.3 | 103.7 | 307.1 | |
| 11 | Thailand (THA) | 208.1 | 206.8 | 206.3 | 621.2 | |
| | Chanittha Sastwej | 104.7 | 104.1 | 102.2 | 311.0 | |
| | Patsugree Sriwichai | 103.4 | 102.7 | 104.1 | 310.2 | |
| 12 | Bangladesh (BAN) | 205.7 | 206.2 | 205.8 | 617.7 | |
| | Mst Mehenaz Sharmin Mim | 103.7 | 102.6 | 102.4 | 308.7 | |
| | Md Robiul Islam | 102.0 | 103.6 | 103.4 | 309.0 | |
| 13 | United Arab Emirates (UAE) | 205.3 | 205.0 | 207.3 | 617.6 | |
| | Fatima Alsuwaidi | 101.9 | 103.0 | 103.9 | 308.8 | |
| | Salem Alyammahi | 103.4 | 102.0 | 103.4 | 308.8 | |
| 14 | Maldives (MDV) | 207.0 | 204.2 | 206.3 | 617.5 | |
| | Easha Shaheed | 104.8 | 103.6 | 102.2 | 310.6 | |
| | Maaidh Mohamed | 102.2 | 100.6 | 104.1 | 306.9 | |
| 15 | Tajikistan (TJK) | 202.7 | 200.3 | 205.1 | 608.1 | |
| | Anora Lagutenko | 103.4 | 101.6 | 104.1 | 309.1 | |
| | S Siyovush Panjsheri | 99.3 | 98.7 | 101.0 | 299.0 | |
| DSQ | Iran (IRI) | — | — | — | — | DSQ |
| | Shermineh Chehel Amirani | — | — | — | — | |
| | Amirmohammad Nekounam | 105.2 | 106.5 | 104.5 | 316.2 | |
| DSQ | Vietnam (VIE) | — | — | — | — | DSQ |
| | Phi Thanh Thao | — | — | — | — | |
| | Nguyen Tam Quang | — | — | — | — | |

=== Final ===
| Rank | Team | 1st Comp. Stage | | | 2nd Comp. Stage - Elimination | | | Total | Remarks |
| Rank | Team | 1 | 2 | 3 | 4 | 5 | 6 | Total | Remarks |
|---|---|---|---|---|---|---|---|---|---|
| 1st place, gold medalist(s) | China (CHN) | 107.2 | 211.9 | 315.7 | 379.5 | 443.6 | — | 507.1 | WR |
| 1st place, gold medalist(s) | Wang Zifei | 53.6 | 51.6 | 51.8 | 31.2 | 32.2 | 32.1 | 252.5 | |
| 1st place, gold medalist(s) | Sheng Lihao | 53.6 | 53.1 | 52.0 | 32.6 | 31.9 | 31.4 | 254.6 | |
| 2nd place, silver medalist(s) | South Korea (KOR) | 104.9 | 209.2 | 314.3 | 378.1 | 440.1 | — | 502.9 | |
| 2nd place, silver medalist(s) | Ban Hyo-jin | 52.8 | 52.8 | 52.6 | 32.0 | 30.7 | 31.7 | 252.6 | |
| 2nd place, silver medalist(s) | Park Ha-jun | 52.1 | 51.5 | 52.5 | 31.8 | 31.3 | 31.1 | 250.3 | |
| 3rd place, bronze medalist(s) | Japan (JPN) | 103.9 | 209.4 | 314.9 | 378.2 | — | — | 439.7 | |
| 3rd place, bronze medalist(s) | Misaki Nobata | 52.4 | 52.7 | 53.1 | 31.6 | 31.0 | — | 220.8 | |
| 3rd place, bronze medalist(s) | Naoki Hanakawa | 51.5 | 52.8 | 52.4 | 31.7 | 30.5 | — | 218.9 | |
| 4 | India (IND) | 103.6 | 207.9 | 312.3 | — | — | — | 376.3 | |
| 4 | Elavenil Valarivan | 51.6 | 52.2 | 52.0 | 32.3 | — | — | 188.1 | |
| 4 | Parth Rakesh Mane | 52.0 | 52.1 | 52.4 | 31.7 | — | — | 188.2 | |
