= 2024 Asian Rifle/Pistol Championships =

- Host city: Jakarta, Indonesia
- Dates: 8–17 January 2024
- Main venue: Senayan Shooting Range

The 2024 Asian Rifle/Pistol Championships was the inaugural edition of the Asian Rifle/Pistol Championships which took place from 8 to 17 January 2024, at Senayan Shooting Range, Jakarta, Indonesia.

It was the second Asian qualifying shooting tournament for the 2024 Summer Olympics in Paris.

== Medal summary ==
=== Men ===
Event	Gold	Silver	Bronze
10 m air pistol	Varun Tomar; India	Arjun Singh Cheema; India	Enkhtaivany Davaakhüü; Mongolia
10 m air pistol team	India; Arjun Singh Cheema; Ujjawal Malik; Varun Tomar	Iran; Javad Foroughi; Amir Joharikhoo; Sajjad Pourhosseini	South Korea; Hong Su-hyeon; Lee Won-ho; Lim Ho-jin
25 m rapid fire pistol	Nikita Chiryukin; Kazakhstan	Vijayveer Sidhu; India	Song Jong-ho; South Korea
25 m rapid fire pistol team	South Korea; Hong Suk-jin; Lee Jae-kyoon; Song Jong-ho	Vietnam; Hà Minh Thành; Phan Xuân Chuyên; Vũ Tiến Nam	Indonesia; Deka Diko Anugerah; Dewa Putu Yadi Suteja; Anang Yulianto
25 m standard pistol	Yogesh Singh; India	Enkhtaivany Davaakhüü; Mongolia	Nikita Chiryukin; Kazakhstan
25 m standard pistol team	India; Yogesh Singh; Amit Kumar; Om Prakash	Vietnam; Hà Minh Thành; Phan Xuân Chuyên; Vũ Tiến Nam	Indonesia; Aris Febrianto; Totok Tri Martanto; Anang Yulianto
10 m air rifle	Ma Sihan; China	Choe Dae-han; South Korea	Rudrankksh Patil; India
10 m air rifle team	South Korea; Choe Dae-han; Park Ha-jun; Shin Hyun-joon	China; Gao Qiang; Ma Sihan; Zhu Mingshuai	India; Arjun Babuta; Rudrankksh Patil; Sri Karthik Sabari Raj
50 m rifle prone	Yu Hao; China	Farid Prayuda; Indonesia	Hamed Al-Khatri; Oman
50 m rifle prone team	China; Miao Yufeng; Tang Chenliang; Yu Hao	Indonesia; Mohammad Hasan Busri; Farid Prayuda; Trisnarmanto	Oman; Hamed Al-Khatri; Salyem Al-Malki; Ali Al-Saaidi
50 m rifle 3 positions	Akhil Sheoran; India	Aishwary Pratap Singh Tomar; India	Thongphaphum Vongsukdee; Thailand
50 m rifle 3 positions team	India; Swapnil Kusale; Akhil Sheoran; Aishwary Pratap Singh Tomar	China; Miao Yufeng; Tang Chenliang; Yu Hao	South Korea; Cheon Min-ho; Kim Jong-hyun; Kim Sang-do

=== Women ===
Event	Gold	Silver	Bronze
10 m air pistol	Esha Singh; India	Kishmala Talat; Pakistan	Rhythm Sangwan; India
10 m air pistol team	India; Surbhi Rao; Rhythm Sangwan; Esha Singh	South Korea; Kim Bo-mi; Kim Yae-rim; Oh Ye-jin	Indonesia; Rihadatul Asyifa; Arista Perdana Putri Darmoyo; Derli Amalia Putri
25 m pistol	Yang Ji-in; South Korea	Kim Ye-ji; South Korea	Rhythm Sangwan; India
25 m pistol team	South Korea; Kim Min-seo; Kim Ye-ji; Yang Ji-in	India; Simranpreet Kaur Brar; Rhythm Sangwan; Esha Singh	Chinese Taipei; Chen Yu-ju; Tu Yi Yi-tzu; Wu Chia-ying
10 m air rifle	Nancy Mandhotra; India	Elavenil Valarivan; India	Shen Yufan; China
10 m air rifle team	India; Mehuli Ghosh; Nancy Mandhotra; Elavenil Valarivan	Singapore; Fernel Tan; Natanya Tan; Martina Veloso	Iran; Fatemeh Amini; Fatemeh Karamzadeh; Yalda Soleimani
50 m rifle prone	Arina Altukhova; Kazakhstan	Gan Chen Jie; Malaysia	Alexandra Le; Kazakhstan
50 m rifle 3 positions	Lee Eun-seo; South Korea	Sift Kaur Samra; India	Ashi Chouksey; India
50 m rifle 3 positions team	India; Ashi Chouksey; Anjum Moudgil; Sift Kaur Samra	Kazakhstan; Arina Altukhova; Yelizaveta Bezrukova; Alexandra Le	South Korea; Im Ha-na; Kim Je-hee; Lee Eun-seo

=== Mixed ===
Event	Gold	Silver	Bronze
10 m air pistol team	Vietnam; Phạm Quang Huy; Trịnh Thu Vinh	India; Arjun Singh Cheema; Rhythm Sangwan	South Korea; Lee Won-ho; Kim Bo-mi
10 m air pistol team	Vietnam; Phạm Quang Huy; Trịnh Thu Vinh	India; Arjun Singh Cheema; Rhythm Sangwan	Pakistan; Gulfam Joseph; Kishmala Talat
10 m air rifle team	India; Rudrankksh Patil; Mehuli Ghosh	China; Zhu Mingshuai; Shen Yufan	South Korea; Park Ha-jun; Lee Eun-seo
10 m air rifle team	India; Rudrankksh Patil; Mehuli Ghosh	China; Zhu Mingshuai; Shen Yufan	Iran; Pouria Norouzian; Yalda Soleimani

== Medal table ==
Rank	Nation	Gold	Silver	Bronze	Total
1	India	12	7	5	24
2	South Korea	5	3	6	14
3	China	3	3	1	7
4	Kazakhstan	2	1	2	5
5	Vietnam	1	2	0	3
6	Indonesia	0	2	3	5
7	Iran	0	1	2	3
8	Mongolia	0	1	1	2
8	Pakistan	0	1	1	2
10	Malaysia	0	1	0	1
10	Singapore	0	1	0	1
12	Oman	0	0	2	2
13	Chinese Taipei	0	0	1	1
13	Thailand	0	0	1	1
Totals (14 entries)		23	23	25	71
