= Samrat Rana =

Indian sport shooter (born 2005)

Personal information
- Born: 8 January 2005 (age 21) Karnal, Haryana, India

Sport
- Sport: Shooting
- Event: 10 m air pistol
Medal record
Men's 10 m air pistol shooting
Representing India
World Championships
Gold medal – first place	2025 Cairo	Individual
Gold medal – first place	2025 Cairo	Team
Silver medal – second place	2025 Cairo	Mixed team
World Cup Final
Bronze medal – third place	2025 Doha	Individual
Asian Championships
Silver medal – second place	2026 New Delhi	Mixed team
Silver medal – second place	2026 New Delhi	Team
Bronze medal – third place	2026 New Delhi	Individual
World Cup
Silver medal – second place	2026 Munich	Mixed team
Junior World Championships
Gold medal – first place	2022 Cairo	Mixed team
Gold medal – first place	2022 Cairo	Team
World University Championships
Gold medal – first place	2024 New Delhi	Team
Silver medal – second place	2024 New Delhi	Mixed team

Samrat Rana (born 8 January 2005) is an Indian sports shooter who specializes in the 10 m air pistol event. He won the 10 m air pistol gold at the 2025 World Championships, becoming only the third Indian world champion after Abhinav Bindra and Rudrankksh Patil.

== Career ==
Since 2018, Samrat has been coached by his father, Ashok Kumar Rana. In 2019, he gained attention after winning a state open championship in Faridabad at the age of 14.

At the 2022 World Championships, he won gold medals in both the 10 m air pistol junior team and junior mixed team events.

He claimed the 10 m air pistol team gold and the mixed team silver at the 2024 World University Championships.

At the 2025 World Championships, Samrat won the gold medal in the 10 m air pistol event. He was also part of the Indian team, alongside Varun Tomar and Shravan Kumar, that secured the team gold. In addition, he won a silver medal in the mixed team event with Esha Singh.
