= Niraj Kumar =

Indian sport shooter (born 2000)

Personal information
- Born: 21 January 2000 (age 26)

Sport
- Sport: Shooting
- Event: 50 metre rifle three positions
Medal record
Men's 50 metre rifle three positions shooting
Representing India
World Championships
Gold medal – first place	2023 Baku	Team
Bronze medal – third place	2022 Cairo	Team
Bronze medal – third place	2026 Doha	Team
Asian Games
Silver medal – second place	2026 Aichi–Nagoya	Team
Asian Championships
Gold medal – first place	2026 New Delhi	Team
Silver medal – second place	2026 New Delhi	Individual
World Cup
Gold medal – first place	2021 Delhi	Team
Junior Asian Championships
Silver medal – second place	2019 Doha	Team
Silver medal – second place	2019 Doha	Individual
Men's 50 metre rifle prone junior shooting
Junior Asian Championships
Gold medal – first place	2019 Doha	Team
Silver medal – second place	2019 Doha	Individual

Niraj Kumar (born 21 January 2000) is an Indian sport shooter who competes in the 50 metre rifle three positions event. He represents the Indian Navy in national and international competitions.

== Career ==
Kumar began shooting through the National Cadet Corps and later specialised in rifle shooting. He won the men's 50 metre rifle three positions event at the 2026 National Selection Trials and represented India at international competitions. He won a bronze medal in the men's team 50 metre rifle three positions event at the 2022 ISSF World Shooting Championships in Cairo and a gold medal in the team event at the 2021 ISSF World Cup in New Delhi.

In 2026, Kumar competed at the Asian Shooting Championships in New Delhi, where he finished runner-up to Aishwary Pratap Singh Tomar in the men's 50 metre rifle three positions event.

In 2026, Kumar won a silver medal in the men's 50 metre rifle three positions team event at the 2026 Asian Games in Aichi-Nagoya, alongside Aishwary Pratap Singh Tomar and Rudrankksh Patil. The Indian team scored 1762-94x to finish second behind China. He also qualified for the individual 50 metre rifle three positions final, finishing eighth.

== Achievements ==
Year	Competition	Event	Result
2021	ISSF World Cup	50 m rifle 3 positions team	Gold
2022	ISSF World Shooting Championships	50 m rifle 3 positions team	Bronze
2026	Asian Games	50 m rifle 3 positions team	Silver
