= Ravinder Singh (sport shooter) =

Indian sport shooter (born 1996)

Personal information
- Born: 17 October 1996 (age 30) Bishnah, Jammu & Kashmir, India
- Height: 1.73 m (5 ft 8 in)
- Military career
- Branch: Indian Army
- Rank: Naib Subedar

Sport
- Sport: Shooting
- Event: 50 m pistol
Medal record
Men's 50 m pistol shooting
Representing India
World Championships
Gold medal – first place	2025 Cairo	Individual
Gold medal – first place	2026 Doha	Team
Silver medal – second place	2025 Cairo	Team
Silver medal – second place	2026 Doha	Individual
Bronze medal – third place	2023 Baku	Individual
Bronze medal – third place	2023 Baku	Team
Asian Championships
Gold medal – first place	2026 New Delhi	Team
Silver medal – second place	2023 Changwon	Individual
Silver medal – second place	2025 Shymkent	Team
Bronze medal – third place	2023 Changwon	Team
Bronze medal – third place	2026 New Delhi	Individual

Ravinder Singh (born 17 October 1996) is an Indian sport shooter who specializes in the 50 m pistol event. He won gold medal in the 50 m pistol event at the 2025 World Championships.

== Background ==
Singh was born in Bishnah. He is trained under the guidance of coach Manoj Kumar. He currently serves as a Havildar in the Indian Army under the sports quota.

== Career ==
In August 2023, he won two Bronze at the 2023 ISSF World Shooting Championships at Baku. He won a bronze in the men’s 50m pistol team event, along with Kamaljeet and Vikram Jagannath Shinde, with a combined score of 1646-28x. He also won a bronze in the individual event with a score of 556.

In 2024, he took part in five World Cups, twice in Cairo and Grenada, and in Lima. He made his international debut at the ISSF Shooting World Cup in New Delhi in 2019 and also took part in the Asian Championships at Taoyuan in the 10m air pistol event.

In the first World Cup of the year on 3 April 2025, he was initially in medal contention but failed to hold on and bowed out after 18th shot to finish 7th in the International Shooting Sport Federation World Cup (Pistol) in Buenos Aires, Argentina.

In April 2025, he represented India at the ISSF World Cup in Lima where he missed a bronze medal along with Manu Baker in the 10m air pistol event to the Chinese team.

In 2025, he also missed a bronze and finished fourth in the 2025 ISSF World Cup.

== Domestic career ==
In December 2024, along with Sejal Kamble, he won the gold for the Indian Army team in the 67th National shooting championship at the Dr. Karni Singh Range, Tughlakabad, Delhi. They beat Pranavi Dwaram and Mukesh Nelavalli 16-12.

In February 2025, he won a silver medal at the National Games 2025 at Uttarakhand in the 10m air pistol event, losing to 15 year old Jonathan Anthony by a score of 0.4.
