= 2026 Asian Rifle/Pistol Championships =

Shooting sports event in New Delhi, India

- Host city: New Delhi, India
- Dates: 2–14 February 2026
- Main venue: Dr. Karni Singh Shooting Range

The 2026 Asian Rifle/Pistol Championships was the 2nd edition of the Asian Rifle/Pistol Championships which took place from 2 to 14 February 2026 at the Dr. Karni Singh Shooting Range, New Delhi, India.

== Medal summary ==
=== Medal table ===
* Host nation (India)

Rank	Nation	Gold	Silver	Bronze	Total
1	India*	15	7	8	30
2	Kazakhstan	3	5	2	10
3	Japan	0	2	3	5
4	Chinese Taipei	0	1	2	3
5	South Korea	0	1	0	1
5	Vietnam	0	1	0	1
7	Kuwait	0	0	1	1
Totals (7 entries)		18	17	16	51

== Medalists ==
=== Men ===
Event	Gold	Silver	Bronze
25m Standard Pistol	Gurpreet Singh; India	Kirill Tsukanov; Kazakhstan	Harsh Gupta; India
25m Standard Pistol Team	Gurpreet Singh; Harsh Gupta; Amanpreet Singh; India	Phan Công Minh; Phạm Quang Huy; Hà Minh Thành; Vietnam	Nikita Chiryukin; Kirill Fedkin; Artemiy Kabakov; Kazakhstan
50m Pistol	Saurabh Chaudhary; India	Kamaljeet; India	Ravinder Singh; India
50m Pistol Team	Saurabh Chaudhary; Kamaljeet; Ravinder Singh; India	Mukhammad Kamalov; Vladimir Svechnikov; Ilkhombek Obidjonov; Uzbekistan	Lại Công Minh; Phạm Quang Huy; Nguyễn Đình Thành; Vietnam
10 m Air Rifle	Rudrankksh Patil; India	Arjun Babuta; India	Naoya Okada; Japan
10 m Air Rifle Team	Rudrankksh Patil; Arjun Babuta; Vishal Singh; India	Nikita Shakhtorin; Konstantin Malinovskiy; Islam Satpayev; Kazakhstan	Naoki Hanakawa; Naoya Okada; Ryosuke Yatsukawa; Japan
50 m Rifle 3 Positions	Aishwary Pratap Singh Tomar; India	Niraj Kumar; India	Akhil Sheoran; India
50 m Rifle 3 Positions Team	Niraj Kumar; Aishwary Pratap Singh Tomar; Akhil Sheoran; India	Naoki Hanakawa; Ryosuke Yatsukawa; Naoya Okada; Japan	Islam Satpayev; Konstantin Malinovskiy; Nikita Shakhtorin; Kazakhstan
50 m Rifle Prone	Islam Satpayev; Kazakhstan	Nikita Shakhtorin; Kazakhstan	Babu Singh Panwar; India
50 m Rifle Prone Team	Islam Satpayev; Nikita Shakhtorin; Konstantin Malinovskiy; Kazakhstan	Babu Singh Panwar; Samarvir Singh; Sartaj Singh Tiwana; India	Ali Al-Mutairi; Khaled Al-Majed; Turki Al-Shemeri; Kuwait

=== Women ===
Event	Gold	Silver	Bronze
10m Air Pistol	Esha Singh; India	Cheng Yen-Ching; Chinese Taipei	Yu Ai-wen; Chinese Taipei
25m Air Pistol	Nguyễn Thùy Trang; Vietnam	Manu Bhaker; India	Esha Singh; India
10m Air Rifle	Elavenil Valarivan; India	Misaki Nobata; Japan	Meghana Sajjanar; India
50m Rifle 3 Positions	Sofiya Shulzhenko; Kazakhstan	Aakriti Dahiya; India	Anjum Moudgil; India
50m Rifle Prone	Priya Brijpal Singh; India	Yelizaveta Bezrukova; Kazakhstan	Sift Kaur Samra; India
10m Air Pistol Team	Suruchi Singh; Manu Bhaker; Esha Singh; India	Trịnh Thu Vinh; Triệu Thị Hoa Hồng; Nguyễn Thùy Trang; Vietnam	Cheng Yen-Ching; Yu Ai-wen; Liu Heng-yu; Chinese Taipei
25m Air Pistol Team	Esha Singh; Manu Bhaker; Rhythm Sangwan; India	Chen Yu-ju; Tien Chia-chen; Wu Chia-ying; Chinese Taipei	Nguyễn Thùy Trang; Trịnh Thu Vinh; Thuy Dung Nguyen; Vietnam
50 m Rifle Prone Team	Sift Kaur Samra; Tejaswini Sawant; Manini Kaushik; India	Yelizaveta Bezrukova; Sofiya Shulzhenko; Arina Malinovskaya; Kazakhstan	

=== Mixed ===
Event	Gold	Silver	Bronze
10m Air Pistol Mixed	Nigina Saidkulova; Mukhammad Kamalov; Uzbekistan	Suruchi Singh; Samrat Rana; India	Cheng Yen-Ching; Hsieh Hsiang-chen; Chinese Taipei
10m Air Rifle Mixed	Elavenil Valarivan; Arjun Babuta; India	Kwon Eun-ji; Kim Woo-rim; South Korea	Misaki Nobata; Naoya Okada; Japan
