= Kwon Eun-ji =

South Korean sport shooter

Personal information
- Nationality: South Korean
- Born: 13 December 2002 (age 23)

Sport
- Sport: Shooting
Medal record
Women's shooting
Representing South Korea
World Championships
Silver medal – second place	2025 Cairo	10 m air rifle team
Asian Championships
Gold medal – first place	2019 Doha	10 m air rifle team
Gold medal – first place	2023 Changwon	10 m air rifle
Silver medal – second place	2025 Shymkent	10 m air rifle team
Silver medal – second place	2026 New Delhi	10m Air Rifle Mixed
Bronze medal – third place	2023 Changwon	Mixed 10 m air rifle team
Bronze medal – third place	2025 Shymkent	10 m air rifle
Bronze medal – third place	2025 Shymkent	air rifle Mixed team

Kwon Eun-ji (Korean: 권은지; Hanja: 權恩志; born 13 December 2002) is a South Korean sport shooter. She represented South Korea at the 2020 Summer Olympics in Tokyo 2021, where she placed 7th in women's 10 metre air rifle.

Competing in the 2024 ISSF World Cup, she won the gold medal in air rifle in Granada in February, and placed fourth in the world cup final in October.
