= Yu Ai-wen =

Taiwanese sport shooter

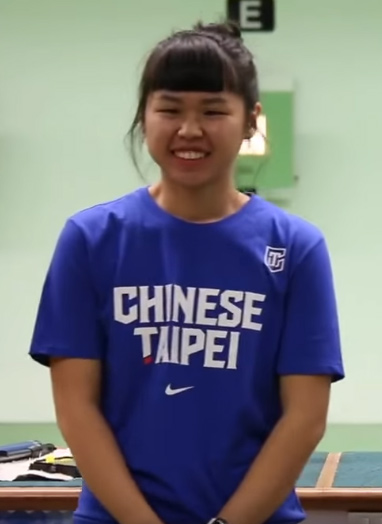
- Yu Ai-wen, in FISU World Shooting Sport Championship, 2018

Personal information
- Nationality: Taiwanese
- Born: 25 December 1995 (age 30)
Medal record
Women's shooting
Representing Chinese Taipei
Asian Championships
Silver medal – second place	2015 Kuwait City	10 m air pistol team
Silver medal – second place	2023 Changwon	10 m air pistol team
Bronze medal – third place	2026 New Delhi	10 m air pistol
Bronze medal – third place	2026 New Delhi	10 m air pistol Team

Yu Ai-Wen (born December 25, 1995) is a Taiwanese female sport shooter. At the 2012 Summer Olympics, she competed in the Women's 10 metre air pistol.

Yu Ai-wen won gold in FISU World Shooting Sport Championship 2018.

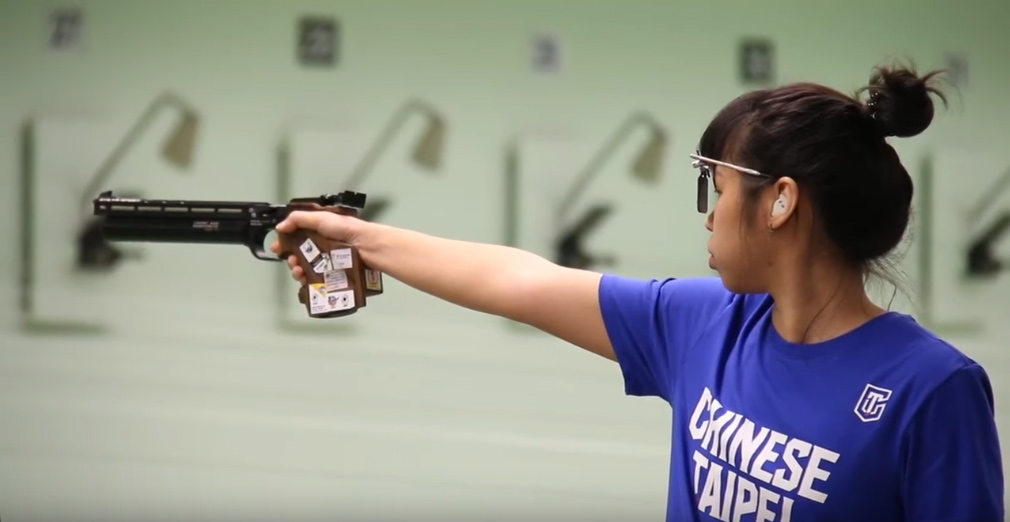
Yu Ai-wen, in FISU World Shooting Sport Championship, 2018
