= Meghana Sajjanar =

Indian sport shooter (born 1994)

Personal information
- Born: 20 January 1994 (age 32) Karnataka, India
- Education: B.Tech CSE at Jain University

Sport
- Sport: Shooting
- Event: 10 m air rifle
Medal record
Women's 10 m air rifle shooting
Representing India
World Championships
Bronze medal – third place	2022 Cairo	Team
Bronze medal – third place	2025 Cairo	Team
Asian Championships
Gold medal – first place	2026 New Delhi	Team
Bronze medal – third place	2026 New Delhi	Individual
World Cup
Bronze medal – third place	2025 Ningbo	Individual
World University Championships
Gold medal – first place	2018 Kuala Lumpur	Team
Silver medal – second place	2018 Kuala Lumpur	Individual

Meghana Sajjanar (born 20 January 1994) is an Indian sport shooter from Karnataka. She specialises in the 10 m air rifle event. She became first women from Karnataka to make it to India's senior shooting team.

== Early life and career ==
Sajjanar is from Bengaluru, Karnataka. Her mother was a teacher and father, an engineer. She completed her B.Tech. at Jain University, Bengaluru.

She represented India at the Gabala World Cup Gabala in the women's 10m air rifle event and shot a score of 419.6 to enter the final where she scored 205.7 and finished fourth. In 2017, she also took part in the Munich and New Delhi World Cup events and finished 15th and 16th respectively. In 2017, she came sixth in the Asian Championship at Wako City. She also won individual silver and team gold in World University Championship 2018. In 2019 Asian Championship at Taoyuan, she came seventh.

Before winning the bronze at Ningbo World Cup, she also took part in the Munich World Cup where she finished 25th.

In 2022 and 2025, she was part of the Indian team that won the bronze medal in the air rifle team event at the Cairo World Championship.

In September 2025, she won a bronze in the women's air rifle in the World Cup in Ningbo, China.

In February 2026, she won an individual bronze and a team gold in the Asian Championship held at the Dr. Karni Singh Shooting Range in Delhi. She was eight months pregnant when she won the bronze in the women's 10m air rifle category.
