= 2025 Asian Shooting Championships =

Shooting event in South Korea

- Host city: Shymkent, Kazakhstan
- Dates: 16–30 August 2025
- Main venue: Shymkent Shooting Plaza

The 2025 Asian Shooting Championships was the 16th edition of the competition, held from 16 to 30 August 2025 at the Shymkent Shooting Plaza, Shymkent, Kazakhstan, featuring more than 100 events across youth, junior, and senior categories.

== Medal table ==
* Host nation (Kazakhstan)

Rank	Nation	Gold	Silver	Bronze	Total
1	China	15	12	3	30
2	India	14	8	9	31
3	South Korea	6	10	10	26
4	Kazakhstan*	6	6	8	20
5	Kuwait	2	2	2	6
6	Iran	2	1	5	8
7	Vietnam	0	3	2	5
8	Qatar	0	1	5	6
9	Japan	0	1	3	4
10	Indonesia	0	1	0	1
11	Chinese Taipei	0	0	1	1
11	Mongolia	0	0	1	1
Totals (12 entries)		45	45	49	139

== Participating nations ==
A total of 27 countries participated.

- Total athletes: 748
- Total starts: 1376
- Bahrain (20)
- Bangladesh (2)
- China (41)
- Chinese Taipei (24)
- Hong Kong (7)
- India (164)
- Indonesia (19)
- Iran (29)
- Japan (22)
- Kazakhstan (111)
- Kuwait (36)
- Kyrgyzstan (11)
- Lebanon (5)
- Malaysia (15)
- Mongolia (19)
- Oman (11)
- Pakistan (14)
- Philippines (11)
- Qatar (24)
- Saudi Arabia (18)
- Singapore (13)
- South Korea (70)
- Tajikistan (3)
- Turkmenistan (2)
- United Arab Emirates (13)
- Uzbekistan (24)
- Vietnam (20)

== Medal summary ==
=== Men - Senior ===
Event	Gold	Silver	Bronze
10 m air pistol	Hu Kai; China	Hong Su-hyeon; South Korea	Amir Joharikhoo; Iran
10 m air pistol team	China; Hu Kai; You Changjie; Zhang Yifan	India; Saurabh Chaudhary; Anmol Jain; Aditya Malra	Iran; Javad Foroughi; Vahid Golkhandan; Amir Joharikhoo
25 m center fire pistol	Rajkanwar Singh Sandhu; India	Lee Jae-kyoon; South Korea	Javad Foroughi; Iran
25 m center fire pistol team	India; Ankur Goel; Rajkanwar Singh Sandhu; Gurpreet Singh	Vietnam; Hà Minh Thành; Phạm Quang Huy; Phan Công Minh	Iran; Javad Foroughi; Vahid Golkhandan; Amir Joharikhoo
25 m rapid fire pistol	Su Lianbofan; China	Anish Bhanwala; India	Lee Jae-kyoon; South Korea
25 m rapid fire pistol team	South Korea; Hong Suk-jin; Lee Jae-kyoon; Yoon Seo-yeong	India; Anish Bhanwala; Neeraj Kumar; Adarsh Singh	China; Su Lianbofan; Yao Jianan; Wang Shiwen
25 m standard pistol	Gurpreet Singh; India	Amanpreet Singh; India	Su Lianbofan; China
25 m standard pistol team	India; Harsh Gupta; Amanpreet Singh; Gurpreet Singh	South Korea; Bang Jae-hyun; Hong Suk-jin; Lee Jae-kyoon	Vietnam; Hà Minh Thành; Phạm Quang Huy; Phan Công Minh
50 m pistol	Javad Foroughi; Iran	Amir Joharikhoo; Iran	Enkhtaivany Davaakhüü; Mongolia
50 m pistol team	Iran; Javad Foroughi; Vahid Golkhandan; Amir Joharikhoo	India; Yogesh Kumar; Amanpreet Singh; Ravinder Singh	South Korea; Bang Jae-hyun; Hong Su-hyeon; Lee Won-ho
10 m air rifle	Islam Satpayev; Kazakhstan	Lu Dingke; China	Park Ha-jun; South Korea
10 m air rifle team	India; Arjun Babuta; Kiran Jadhav; Rudrankksh Patil	China; Li Xianhao; Lu Dingke; Wang Honghao	South Korea; Lee Jun-hwan; Park Ha-jun; Seo Jun-won
50 m rifle prone	Kim Na-gwan; South Korea	Zhao Wenyu; China	Joung Seung-woo; South Korea
50 m rifle prone team	South Korea; Joung Seung-woo; Kim Jung-hyun; Kim Na-gwan	China; Li Muyuan; Lin Feng; Zhao Wenyu	Kazakhstan; Islam Satpayev; Nikita Shakhtorin; Yuriy Yurkov
50 m rifle 3 positions	Aishwary Pratap Singh Tomar; India	Zhao Wenyu; China	Naoya Okada; Japan
50 m rifle 3 positions team	China; Li Muyuan; Lin Feng; Zhao Wenyu	India; Akhil Sheoran; Chain Singh; Aishwary Pratap Singh Tomar	South Korea; Kim Na-gwan; Lee Jun-ho; Mo Dai-seong
10 m running target	Jeong You-jin; South Korea	Muhammad Sejahtera Dwi Putra; Indonesia	Assadbek Nazirkulyev; Kazakhstan
10 m running target team	Kazakhstan; Andrey Khudyakov; Assadbek Nazirkulyev; Daniil Yakovenko	Vietnam; Hồ Lý Thành Đạt; Ngô Hữu Vượng; Nguyễn Tuấn Anh	Kazakhstan; Bakhtiyar Ibrayev; Artyom Khorolskiy; Ilya Zoteyev
10 m running target mixed	Assadbek Nazirkulyev; Kazakhstan	Andrey Khudyakov; Kazakhstan	Jeong You-jin; South Korea
10 m running target mixed team	Kazakhstan; Andrey Khudyakov; Assadbek Nazirkulyev; Daniil Yakovenko	Vietnam; Hồ Lý Thành Đạt; Ngô Hữu Vượng; Nguyễn Tuấn Anh	Kazakhstan; Bakhtiyar Ibrayev; Artyom Khorolskiy; Ilya Zoteyev
Trap	Qi Ying; China	Bhowneesh Mendiratta; India	Chen Pengyu; China
Trap team	Kuwait; Abdulrahman Al-Faihan; Naser Al-Meqlad; Talal Al-Rashidi	China; Chen Pengyu; Qi Ying; Yu Haicheng	Qatar; Saeed Abusharib; Mohammed Al-Rumaihi; Angelo Scalzone
Double trap	Ankur Mittal; India	Artyom Chikulayev; Kazakhstan	Ahmad Al-Afasi; Kuwait
Skeet	Anantjeet Singh Naruka; India	Mansour Al-Rashidi; Kuwait	Ali Ahmed Al-Ishaq; Qatar
Skeet team	Kuwait; Abdullah Al-Rashidi; Mansour Al-Rashidi; Abdulaziz Al-Saad	South Korea; Jang Ja-yong; Kim Min-su; Lee Jong-jun	Qatar; Rashid Saleh Al-Athba; Ali Ahmed Al-Ishaq; Mohamed Al-Kuwari

=== Women - Senior ===
Event	Gold	Silver	Bronze
10 m air pistol	Ma Qianke; China	Yang Ji-in; South Korea	Manu Bhaker; India
10 m air pistol team	China; Ma Qianke; Yao Qianxun; Zheng Zhuwenxi	South Korea; Kim Bo-mi; Yang Ji-in; Yoo Hyun-young	India; Manu Bhaker; Palak Gulia; Suruchi Singh
25 m pistol	Zhang Yueyue; China	Xiao Jiaruixuan; China	Trịnh Thu Vinh; Vietnam
25 m pistol team	China; Xiao Jiaruixuan; Yao Qianxun; Zhang Yueyue	South Korea; Nam Da-jung; Oh Ye-jin; Yang Ji-in	India; Manu Bhaker; Simranpreet Kaur Brar; Esha Singh
10 m air rifle	Elavenil Valarivan; India	Peng Xinlu; China	Kwon Eun-ji; South Korea
10 m air rifle team	China; Liu Yafei; Peng Xinlu; Zhang Liyuan	South Korea; Keum Ji-hyeon; Kwon Eun-ji; Kwon Yu-na	India; Mehuli Ghosh; Ananya Naidu; Elavenil Valarivan
50 m rifle prone	Im Ha-na; South Korea	Lee Eun-seo; South Korea	Manini Kaushik; India
50 m rifle prone team	South Korea; Im Ha-na; Kim Je-hee; Lee Eun-seo	India; Manini Kaushik; Surabhi Bharadwaj Rapole; Vidarsa Kochalumkal Vinod	Kazakhstan; Alexandra Le; Yelizaveta Bezrukova; Arina Malinovskaya
50 m rifle 3 positions	Sift Kaur Samra; India	Yang Yujie; China	Misaki Nobata; Japan
50 m rifle 3 positions team	India; Ashi Chouksey; Anjum Moudgil; Sift Kaur Samra	Japan; Shiori Hirata; Ai Horinouchi; Misaki Nobata	South Korea; Im Ha-na; Kim Je-hee; Lee Eun-seo
10 m running target	Fatima Irnazarova; Kazakhstan	Alexandra Saduakassova; Kazakhstan	Zukhra Irnazarova; Kazakhstan
10 m running target mixed	Alexandra Saduakassova; Kazakhstan	Fatima Irnazarova; Kazakhstan	Amal Mohammed; Qatar
Trap	Neeru Dhanda; India	Ray Bassil; Qatar	Aashima Ahlawat; India
Trap team	India; Aashima Ahlawat; Neeru Dhanda; Preeti Rajak	China; Wu Cuicui; Yu Yingping; Zhang Zixi	Kuwait; Sarah Al-Hawal; Shahad Al-Hawal; Reem Al-Zamanan
Skeet	Jiang Yiting; China	Che Yufei; China	Anastassiya Molchanova; Kazakhstan
Skeet team	China; Che Yufei; Gao Jinmei; Jiang Yiting	Kazakhstan; Olga Khailova; Anastassiya Molchanova; Adel Sadakbayeva	India; Maheshwari Chauhan; Raiza Dhillon; Ganemat Sekhon

=== Mixed - Senior ===
Event	Gold	Silver	Bronze
10 m air pistol team	China; Zhang Yifan; Ma Qianke	South Korea; Lee Won-ho; Yoo Hyun-young	India; Saurabh Chaudhary; Suruchi Singh
10 m air pistol team	China; Zhang Yifan; Ma Qianke	South Korea; Lee Won-ho; Yoo Hyun-young	Iran; Vahid Golkhandan; Hanieh Rostamian
10 m air rifle team	India; Arjun Babuta; Elavenil Valarivan	China; Lu Dingke; Peng Xinlu	South Korea; Park Ha-jun; Kwon Eun-ji
10 m air rifle team	India; Arjun Babuta; Elavenil Valarivan	China; Lu Dingke; Peng Xinlu	Japan; Naoki Hanakawa; Hinata Taichi
Trap team	China; Chen Pengyu; Zhang Zixi	Kuwait; Naser Al-Meqlad; Sarah Al-Hawal	Chinese Taipei; Yang Kun-pi; Liu Wan-yu
Trap team	China; Chen Pengyu; Zhang Zixi	Kuwait; Naser Al-Meqlad; Sarah Al-Hawal	Kazakhstan; Alisher Aisalbayev; Aizhan Dosmagambetova
Skeet team	China; Han Xu; Jiang Yiting	Kazakhstan; Eduard Yechshenko; Anastassiya Molchanova	Qatar; Ali Ahmed Al-Ishaq; Sarah Ghulam Mohammed
Skeet team	China; Han Xu; Jiang Yiting	Kazakhstan; Eduard Yechshenko; Anastassiya Molchanova	India; Abhay Singh Sekhon; Ganemat Sekhon

== See also ==
- Asian Shooting Championships
- 2024 Asian Rifle/Pistol Championships
- 2024 Asian Shotgun Championships
