= Akhil Sheoran =

Indian sport shooter

Personal information
- Nationality: Indian
- Born: 23 July 1995 (age 31) Baraut, Uttar Pradesh, India
- Education: Hansraj College
- Height: 1.8 m (5 ft 11 in)
- Police career
- Branch: Uttar Pradesh Police
- Service years: 2024 - present
- Rank: DSP

Sport
- Sport: Shooting
- Events: 50 m rifle 3 positions 10 m air rifle

Achievements and titles
- Highest world ranking: 1
Medal record
Men's shooting
Representing India
World Championships
Gold medal – first place	2023 Baku	50 m rifle 3 positions team
Bronze medal – third place	2023 Baku	50 m rifle 3 positions
Bronze medal – third place	2026 Doha	50 m rifle 3 positions team
World Cup Final
Bronze medal – third place	2024 New Delhi	50 m rifle 3 positions
World Cup
Gold medal – first place	2018 Guadalajara	50 m rifle 3 positions
Bronze medal – third place	2022 Cairo	50 m rifle 3 positions mixed team
Bronze medal – third place	2024 Cairo	50 m rifle 3 positions
Asian Games
Gold medal – first place	2022 Hangzhou	50 m rifle 3 positions team
Asian Championships
Gold medal – first place	2024 Jakarta	50 m rifle 3 positions
Gold medal – first place	2024 Jakarta	50 m rifle 3 positions team
Gold medal – first place	2026 New Delhi	50 m rifle 3 positions team
Silver medal – second place	2016 Tehran	10 m air rifle team
Silver medal – second place	2023 Changwon	50 m rifle 3 positions team
Silver medal – second place	2025 Shymkent	50 m rifle 3 positions team
Bronze medal – third place	2026 New Delhi	50 m rifle 3 positions
South Asian Games
Silver medal – second place	2019 Kathmandu	50 m rifle 3 positions
World University Games
Bronze medal – third place	2015 Gwangju	10 m air rifle team
Junior World Cup
Silver medal – second place	2015 Suhl	50 m rifle 3 positions
Junior Asian Championships
Bronze medal – third place	2012 Nanchang	10 m air rifle

Akhil Sheoran (born 23 July 1995) is a professional Indian sport shooter. In 2026, he was conferred with the Arjuna Award for 2025, for his achievements in shooting.
