= Liu Yukun =

Chinese sport shooter (born 1997)

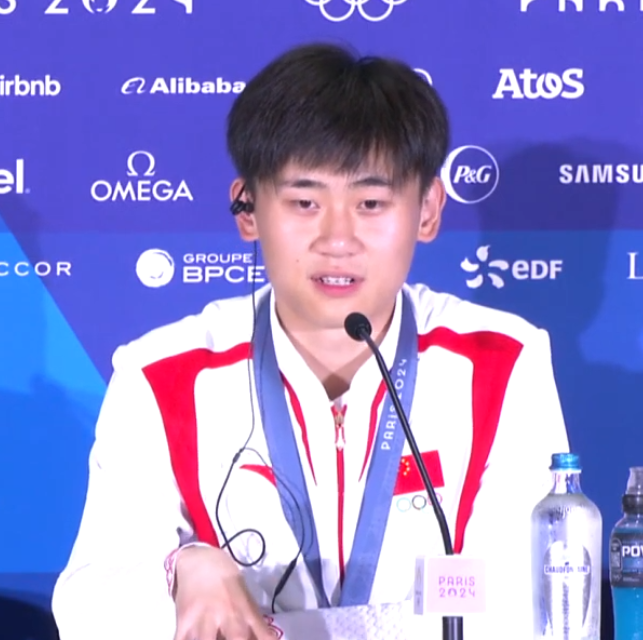
- Liu at the 2024 Summer Olympics

Personal information
- Born: April 12, 1997 (age 29) Xi'an, Shaanxi, China

Sport
- Country: China
- Sport: Sport shooting
Medal record
Men's Shooting
Representing China
Olympic Games
Gold medal – first place	2024 Paris	50 m rifle 3 positions
World Championships
Gold medal – first place	2025 Cairo	50 m rifle 3 positions
Gold medal – first place	2025 Cairo	50 m rifle prone team
Asian Games
Gold medal – first place	2026 Aichi–Nagoya	50 m rifle 3 positions
Gold medal – first place	2026 Aichi–Nagoya	50 m rifle 3 positions team
Asian Championships
Gold medal – first place	2019 Doha	10 m air rifle
Gold medal – first place	2019 Doha	10 m air rifle team

Liu Yukun (born 12 April 1997) is a Chinese sport shooter and Olympic champion. At the 2024 Summer Olympics, Liu set the Olympic qualifying record and won gold in the men's 50 metres rifle three positions.

He was named the athlete of the year in October 2024 by the International Shooting Sport Federation (ISSF) at Dr. Karni Singh Shooting Range, Tughlakabad, India.
