= 2025 ISSF World Shooting Championships =

Shooting competition

- Venue: Egypt International Olympic City
- Location: Cairo, Egypt
- Dates: 6–18 November
- Competitors: 720 from 73 nations

The 54th ISSF World Shooting Championships was held in Cairo, Egypt from 6 to 18 November 2025.

== Medal table ==
* Host nation (Egypt)

Rank	Nation	Gold	Silver	Bronze	Total
1	China (CHN)	12	7	2	21
2	South Korea (KOR)	7	3	4	14
3	India (IND)	3	6	4	13
4	Switzerland (SUI)	3	5	4	12
5	Norway (NOR)	3	4	3	10
6	France (FRA)	3	0	3	6
7	Germany (GER)	2	2	1	5
8	Czech Republic (CZE)	2	1	0	3
9	Ukraine (UKR)	1	1	3	5
10	Austria (AUT)	1	1	2	4
11	Poland (POL)	1	0	2	3
12	Hungary (HUN)	0	1	2	3
12	Turkey (TUR)	0	1	2	3
14	Denmark (DEN)	0	1	1	2
15	Azerbaijan (AZE)	0	1	0	1
15	Hong Kong (HKG)	0	1	0	1
15	Italy (ITA)	0	1	0	1
15	Romania (ROU)	0	1	0	1
15	Sweden (SWE)	0	1	0	1
20	Kazakhstan (KAZ)	0	0	2	2
21	Great Britain (GBR)	0	0	1	1
21	Iceland (ISL)	0	0	1	1
–	Individual Neutral Athletes (AIN)	0	0	1	1
Totals (22 entries)		38	38	38	114

== Medal summary ==
=== Rifle ===
Men

Event	Gold		Silver		Bronze	
10 m air rifle	Maximilian Dallinger; Germany	252.0	Victor Lindgren; Sweden	251.7	Sheng Lihao; China	229.9
10 m air rifle team	China (CHN); Wang Honghao; Sheng Lihao; Wang Yutong	1898.4 WR	Germany (GER); Maximilian Dallinger; Maximilian Ulbrich; Daniel Bühlmeyer	1893.7	Hungary (HUN); Zalán Pekler; István Péni; Soma Hammerl	1891.4
50 m rifle 3 positions	Liu Yukun; China	467.1	Aishwary Tomar; India	466.9	Romain Aufrere; France	455.8
50 m rifle 3 positions team	France (FRA); Brian Baudouin; Lucas Kryzs; Romain Aufrere	1771-101x	Norway (NOR); Ole Martin Halvorsen; Jens Østli; Jon-Hermann Hegg	1768-92x	Switzerland (SUI); Fabio Wyrsch; Jan Lochbihler; Christoph Dürr	1764-100x
50 m rifle prone	Alexander Schmirl; Austria	629.1	Jan Lochbihler; Switzerland	628.1	Fabio Wyrsch; Switzerland	628.0
50 m rifle prone team	China (CHN); Zhao Wenyu; Liu Yukun; Li Muyuan	1881.3 WR	Switzerland (SUI); Jan Lochbihler; Fabio Wyrsch; Christoph Dürr	1880.5	Norway (NOR); Ole Martin Halvorsen; Jon-Hermann Hegg; Jens Østli	1874.7
300 m rifle 3 positions	Tomasz Bartnik; Poland	594-25x WR	Peter Sidi; Romania	591-27x	Pascal Bachmann; Switzerland	589-25x
300 m rifle 3 positions team	Switzerland (SUI); Pascal Bachmann; Gilles Dufaux; Sandro Greuter	1762-70x	Austria (AUT); Alexander Schmirl; Bernhard Pickl; Dominic Einwaller	1750-63x	Poland (POL); Tomasz Bartnik; Maciej Kowalewicz; Wiktor Sajdak	1746-57x
300 m rifle prone	Petr Nymburský; Czech Republic	597-40x	Max Ohlenburger; Germany	597-38x	Jón Þór Sigurðsson; Iceland	597-36x
300 m rifle prone team	Czech Republic (CZE); Aleš Entrichel; Petr Nymburský; Jiří Přívratský	1787-99x	Switzerland (SUI); Pascal Bachmann; Sandro Greuter; Gilles Dufaux	1784-93x	Poland (POL); Maciej Kowalewicz; Tomasz Bartnik; Andrzej Burda	1780-103x

Women

Event	Gold		Silver		Bronze	
10 m air rifle	Ban Hyo-jin; South Korea	255.0	Wang Zifei; China	254.0	Elavenil Valarivan; India	232.0
10 m air rifle team	China (CHN); Han Jiayu; Wang Zifei; Peng Xinlu	1901.7	South Korea (KOR); Kwon Eun-ji; Kwon Yu-na; Ban Hyo-jin	1899.9	India (IND); Elavenil Valarivan; Meghana Sajjanar; Shreya Agrawal	1893.3
50 m rifle 3 positions	Jeanette Hegg Duestad; Norway	465.8	Emely Jäggi; Switzerland	465.3 EWRJ	Seonaid McIntosh; Great Britain	454.6
50 m rifle 3 positions team	China (CHN); Han Jiayu; Wang Zifei; Miao Wanru	1766-95x	Switzerland (SUI); Vivien Jäggi; Emely Jäggi; Nina Christen	1761-98x	Kazakhstan (KAZ); Alexandra Le; Arina Malinovskaya; Yelizaveta Bezrukova	1758-81x
50 m rifle prone	Oh Se-hee; South Korea	626.5	Jeanette Hegg Duestad; Norway	625.9	Betina Ljunggren Petersen; Denmark	625.1
50 m rifle prone team	South Korea (KOR); Oh Se-hee; Lee Kye-rim; Im Ha-na	1872.8	Denmark (DEN); Betina Ljunggren Petersen; Rikke Ibsen; Charlotte Jakobsen	1866.1	Norway (NOR); Jeanette Hegg Duestad; Milda Marina Haugen; Mari Bårdseng Løvseth	1863.2
300 m rifle 3 positions	Katrine Lund; Norway	588-28x	Jeanette Hegg Duestad; Norway	587-17x	Marta Szabo Bouza; Switzerland	586-14x
300 m rifle prone	Anja Senti; Switzerland	598-39x	Jenny Vatne; Norway	598-37x	Katrine Lund; Norway	597-33x

Open

Event	Gold	Silver	Bronze
300 m standard rifle	Katrine Lund; Norway	Jiří Přívratský; Czech Republic	Bernhard Pickl; Austria

Mixed

Event	Gold	Silver	Bronze
10 m air rifle	China (CHN); Wang Zifei; Sheng Lihao	China (CHN); Peng Xinlu; Wang Honghao	Turkey (TUR); Damla Köse; Mert Nalbant

=== Pistol ===
Men

Event	Gold		Silver		Bronze	
10 m air pistol	Samrat Rana; India	243.7	Hu Kai; China	243.3	Varun Tomar; India	221.7
10 m air pistol team	India (IND); Samrat Rana; Varun Tomar; Sharvan Kumar	1754-69x	Italy (ITA); Federico Maldini; Paolo Monna; Mattia Scodes	1746-66x	Germany (GER); Christian Reitz; Robin Walter; Paul Froehlich	1740-69x
25 m rapid fire pistol	Clément Bessaguet; France	31	Anish Bhanwala; India	28	Maksym Horodynets; Ukraine	25
25 m rapid fire pistol team	Germany (GER); Emanuel Müller; Oliver Geis; Florian Peter	1748-56x	China (CHN); Ni Zhixin; He Shiyu; Su Lianbofan	1740-53x	South Korea (KOR); Lee Gun-hyeok; Lee Jae-kyoon; Hong Suk-jin	1735-59x
25 m center fire pistol	Pavlo Korostylov; Ukraine	584-29x	Gurpreet Singh; India	584-18x	Yann Fridrici; France	583-18x
25 m center fire pistol team	France (FRA); Yann Pierre Louis Fridrici; Kevin Chapon; Theo Moczko	1737-52x	Ukraine (UKR); Pavlo Korostylov; Volodymyr Pasternak; Maksym Horodynets	1734-68x	South Korea (KOR); Cho Yeong-jae; So Seung-seob; Lee Gun-hyeok	1734-56x
25 m standard pistol	Adrian Schaub; Austria	576-18x	Cho Yeong-jae; South Korea	576-15x	Pavlo Korostylov; Ukraine	573-17x
25 m standard pistol team	South Korea (KOR); Cho Yeong-jae; Lee Gun-hyeok; Park Yeong-yi	1711-44x	China (CHN); Su Lianbofan; He Shiyu; Ne Zhixin	1700-38x	Kazakhstan (KAZ); Nikita Chiryukin; Kirill Fedkin; Artemiy Kabakov	1699-35x
50 m meter pistol	Ravinder Singh; India	569-12x	Kim Cheong-yong; South Korea	556-12x	Anton Aristarkhov; Individual Neutral Athletes	556-8x
50 m meter pistol team	South Korea (KOR); Kim Cheong-yong; So Seung-seob; Bae Jae-beom	1648	India (IND); Ravinder Singh; Kamaljeet; Yogesh Kumar	1646	Ukraine (UKR); Pavlo Korostylov; Oleh Omelchuk; Viktor Bankin	1644

Women

Event	Gold		Silver		Bronze	
10 m air pistol	Yao Qianxun; China	243.0	Shing Ho Ching; Hong Kong	241.2	Qian Wei; China	221.4
10 m air pistol team	China (CHN); Qian Wei; Yao Qianxun; Jiang Ranxin	1752-76x WR	India (IND); Esha Singh; Manu Bhaker; Suruchi Singh	1740-62x	South Korea (KOR); Oh Ye-jin; Kim Bo-mi; Yang Ji-in	1729-58x
25 m pistol	Yang Ji-in; South Korea	40	Yao Qianxun; China	38	Esha Singh; India	30
25 meter pistol team	South Korea (KOR); Yang Ji-in; Oh Ye-jin; Nam Da-jung	1757-57x	China (CHN); Yao Qianxun; Chen Jia; Sun Yujie	1753-58x	France (FRA); Mathilde Lamolle; Camille Jedrzejewski; Héloïse Fourré	1748-64x
25 m standard pistol	Yao Qianxun; China	570-24x	Şevval İlayda Tarhan; Turkey	569-11x	Veronika Major; Hungary	566-16x
25 meter standard pistol team	China (CHN); Yao Qianxun; Sun Yujie; Chen Jia	1693-53x WR	Hungary (HUN); Veronika Major; Sara Rahel Fabian; Renáta Tobai-Sike	1659-37x	Turkey (TUR); Şevval İlayda Tarhan; Şimal Yılmaz; Esra Bozabalı	1659-26x
50 m meter pistol	Yao Qianxun; China	550-8x	Nigar Nasirova; Azerbaijan	550-7x	Sylvia Steiner; Austria	540-9x

Mixed

Event	Gold	Silver	Bronze
10 m air pistol	China (CHN); Yao Qianxun; Hu Kai	India (IND); Esha Singh; Samrat Rana	South Korea (KOR); Oh Ye-jin; Hong Su-hyeon

== Participating nations ==
- Total number of federations: 71
- Total number of NOCs: 70
- Total number of athletes: 720
- Total number of starts: 1544
1. Authorised Neutral Athletes (28)
2. Albania (2)
3. Argentina (4)
4. Armenia (4)
5. Australia (4)
6. Austria (15)
7. Azerbaijan (3)
8. Barbados (2)
9. Bosnia and Herzegovina (4)
10. Brazil (6)
11. Bulgaria (8)
12. Canada (6)
13. Chile (4)
14. China (21)
15. Cameroon (2)
16. Colombia (1)
17. Croatia (16)
18. Cuba (4)
19. Czech Republic (18)
20. Denmark (8)
21. Egypt (35) (Host)
22. El Salvador (12)
23. Estonia (11)
24. Finland (6)
25. France (18)
26. Georgia (6)
27. Germany (31)
28. Great Britain (9)
29. Greece (6)
30. Hong Kong (5)
31. Hungary (17)
32. Iceland (2)
33. India (40)
34. Iran (14)
35. Italy (20)
36. Japan (19)
37. Kazakhstan (15)
38. South Korea (27)
39. Kosovo (6)
40. Kyrgyzstan (7)
41. Saudi Arabia (6)
42. Latvia (6)
43. Malta (8)
44. Moldova (1)
45. Mexico (7)
46. Mongolia (12)
47. New Zealand (4)
48. Norway (14)
49. Oman (12)
50. Pakistan (5)
51. Peru (2)
52. Poland (14)
53. North Korea (10)
54. Romania (4)
55. South Africa (4)
56. San Marino (1)
57. Serbia (12)
58. Singapore (8)
59. Slovakia (12)
60. Slovenia (10)
61. Sweden (11)
62. Switzerland (20)
63. Chinese Taipei (13)
64. Tunisia (2)
65. Turkey (12)
66. Ukraine (13)
67. United States (18)
68. Uzbekistan (6)
