= Misaki Nobata =

Japanese sports shooter

Personal information
- Born: 25 August 2003 (age 23) Ōita Prefecture

Sport
- Sport: Shooting sports
Medal record
Women's shooting
Representing Japan
World Championships
| Bronze medal – third place | 2026 Doha | 10 m air rifle team |
| Bronze medal – third place | 2026 Doha | 50 m rifle 3 positions |
Asian Games
| Bronze medal – third place | 2026 Aichi–Nagoya | 10 m air rifle team |
| Bronze medal – third place | 2026 Aichi–Nagoya | 10 m air rifle mixed team |
Asian Championships
| Silver medal – second place | 2025 Shymkent | 50 m rifle 3 positions team |
| Silver medal – second place | 2026 New Delhi | 10 m air rifle |
| Bronze medal – third place | 2025 Shymkent | 50 m rifle 3 positions |
| Bronze medal – third place | 2026 New Delhi | 10 m air rifle mixed |

Misaki Nobata (野畑 美咲, Nobata Misaki; born 25 August 2003) is a Japanese sports shooter. She competed in the women's 10 metre air rifle event at the 2024 Summer Olympics.
