= Im Ha-na =

South Korean sport shooter

Personal information
- Nationality: South Korean
- Born: 1 January 2000 (age 26) Gangwon, South Korea
- Height: 1.63 m (5 ft 4 in)

Sport
- Country: South Korea
- Sport: Shooting
- Event: Air rifle
- Club: Chung-Ju High School
Medal record
Women's shooting
Representing South Korea
World Championships
Gold medal – first place	2018 Changwon	10 m air rifle
Gold medal – first place	2018 Changwon	10 m team air rifle
Gold medal – first place	2025 Cairo	50 m rifle prone team
Asian Championships
Gold medal – first place	2025 Shymkent	50 m rifle prone
Gold medal – first place	2025 Shymkent	50 m rifle prone team
Bronze medal – third place	2015 Kuwait City	10 m air rifle team

Im Ha-na (born 1 January 2000) is a South Korean sport shooter.

She participated at the 2018 ISSF World Shooting Championships.
