= Zhang Changhong (sport shooter) =

Chinese sport shooter

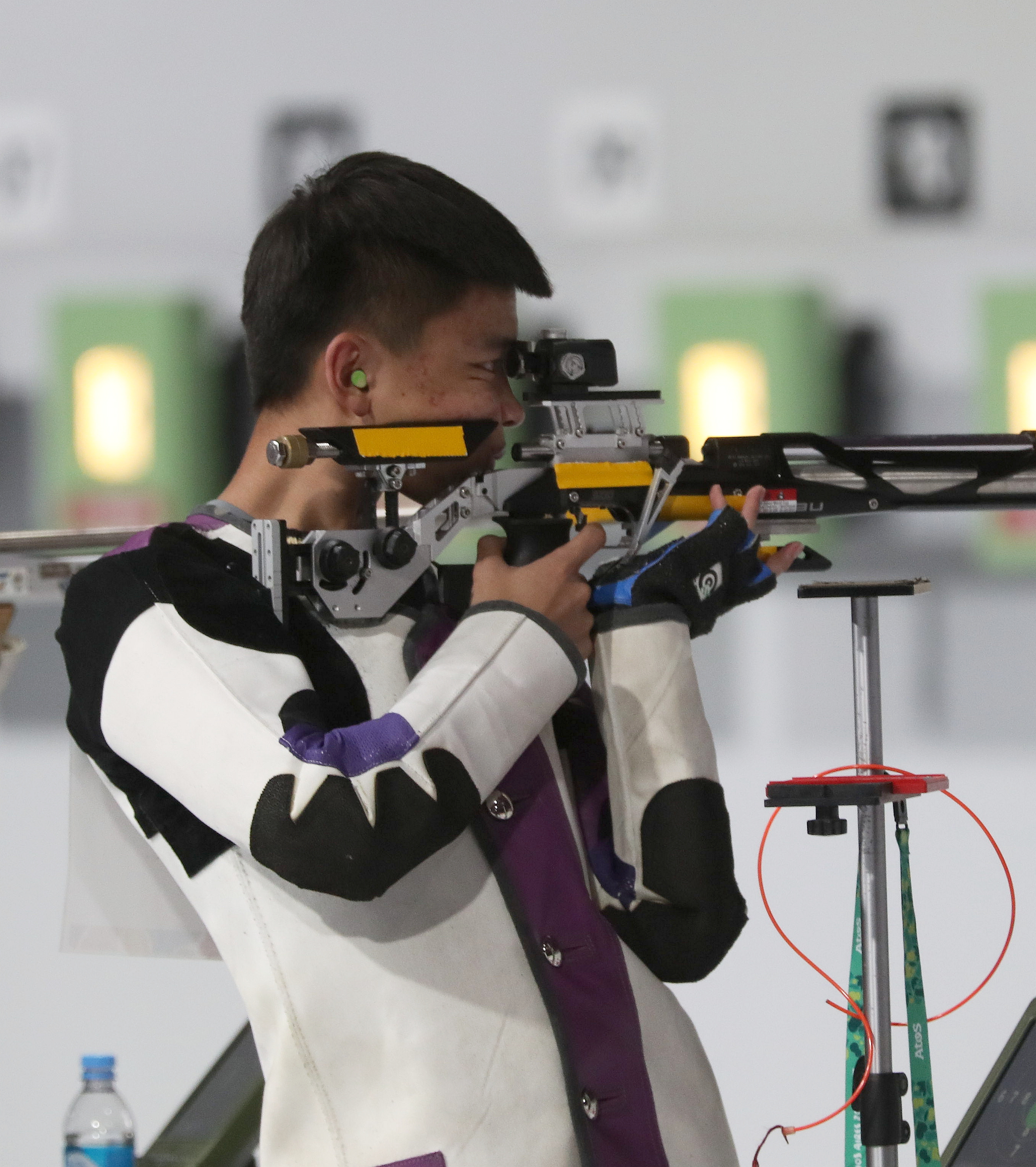
- Zhang Changhong at the 2018 Summer Youth Olympics

Personal information
- Nationality: Chinese
- Born: 14 February 2000 (age 26) Shandong, China

Sport
- Country: China
- Sport: Shooting
- Event: Rifle
Medal record
Men's shooting
Representing China
Olympic Games
Gold medal – first place	2020 Tokyo	50 m rifle 3 positions
World Championships
Gold medal – first place	2026 Doha	10 m air rifle team
Silver medal – second place	2026 Doha	10 m air rifle mixed
Bronze medal – third place	2018 Changwon	50 m rifle 3 positions team junior
Bronze medal – third place	2026 Doha	50 m rifle prone
Asian Games
Gold medal – first place	2026 Aichi–Nagoya	10 m air rifle team
Gold medal – first place	2026 Aichi–Nagoya	50 m rifle 3 positions team
Silver medal – second place	2026 Aichi–Nagoya	50 m rifle 3 positions
ISSF World Cup
Bronze medal – third place	2019 Rio de Janeiro	50 m rifle 3 positions
ISSF Junior World Cup
Gold medal – first place	2018 Sydney	50 m rifle 3 positions
Bronze medal – third place	2018 Suhl	50 m rifle 3 positions
Bronze medal – third place	2018 Suhl	10 m air rifle team
Gold medal – first place	2019 Suhl	10 m air rifle team
Gold medal – first place	2019 Suhl	50 m rifle 3 positions team
Silver medal – second place	2019 Suhl	10 m air rifle
Bronze medal – third place	2019 Suhl	50 m rifle prone
Bronze medal – third place	2019 Suhl	50 m rifle 3 positions
Asian Shooting Championships
Bronze medal – third place	2019 Doha	50 m rifle 3 positions team

Zhang Changhong (born 14 February 2000) is a Chinese sport shooter.

He participated at the 2018 ISSF World Shooting Championships, winning a bronze medal.

He qualified to represent China at the 2020 Summer Olympics, winning the gold medal in the 50 m rifle 3 positions category, where he also set a new world record for the event.
