= Elavenil Valarivan =

Indian sport shooter (born 1999)

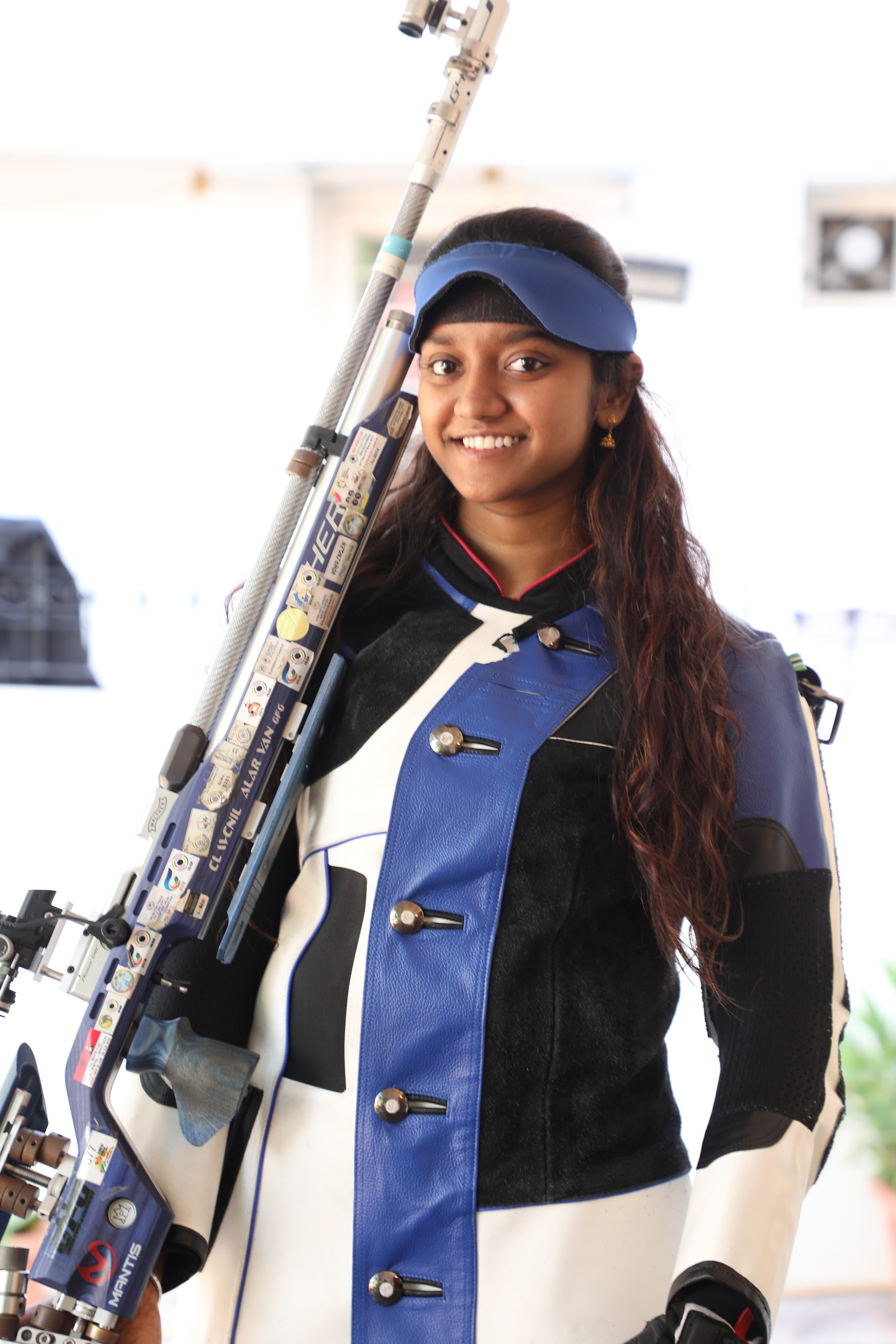
- Valarivan in 2021

Personal information
- Nickname: Ela
- Born: 2 August 1999 (age 27) Cuddalore, Tamil Nadu, India
- Education: Gujarat University
- Height: 1.64 m (5 ft 5 in)

Sport
- Sport: Shooting
- Event: 10 m air rifle

Achievements and titles
- Personal bests: 253.6 AR NR (2025); 635.9 NR (2025)
Medal record
Women's 10 m air rifle shooting
Representing India
Event	1st	2nd	3rd
World Championships	0	1	3
World Cup Final	1	0	0
Asian Games	0	2	0
Asian Championships	8	4	1
World Cup	4	1	1
Junior World Championships	1	1	0
Junior Asian Championships	0	0	1
Junior World Cup	6	0	1
World University Games	1	1	0
World University Championships	1	0	1
Total	22	10	8
World Championships
Silver medal – second place	2026 Doha	Team
Bronze medal – third place	2022 Cairo	Team
Bronze medal – third place	2025 Cairo	Team
Bronze medal – third place	2025 Cairo	Individual
World Cup Final
Gold medal – first place	2019 Putian	Individual
Asian Games
Silver medal – second place	2026 Aichi–Nagoya	Individual
Silver medal – second place	2026 Aichi–Nagoya	Team
Asian Championships
Gold medal – first place	2019 Taoyuan	Individual
Gold medal – first place	2019 Taoyuan	Team
Gold medal – first place	2022 Daegu	Team
Gold medal – first place	2025 Shymkent	Individual
Gold medal – first place	2025 Shymkent	Mixed team
Gold medal – first place	2026 New Delhi	Individual
Gold medal – first place	2026 New Delhi	Mixed team
Gold medal – first place	2026 New Delhi	Team
Silver medal – second place	2019 Doha	Team
Silver medal – second place	2019 Taoyuan	Mixed team
Silver medal – second place	2022 Daegu	Mixed team
Silver medal – second place	2024 Jakarta	Individual
Bronze medal – third place	2025 Shymkent	Team
World Cup
Gold medal – first place	2019 Rio de Janeiro	Individual
Gold medal – first place	2021 New Delhi	Mixed team
Gold medal – first place	2022 Baku	Team
Gold medal – first place	2023 Rio de Janeiro	Individual
Silver medal – second place	2022 Changwon	Team
Bronze medal – third place	2025 Munich	Individual
Junior World Championships
Gold medal – first place	2018 Changwon	Team
Silver medal – second place	2018 Changwon	Individual
Junior Asian Championships
Bronze medal – third place	2018 Kuwait	Individual
Junior World Cup
Gold medal – first place	2018 Sydney	Individual
Gold medal – first place	2018 Sydney	Team
Gold medal – first place	2018 Suhl	Individual
Gold medal – first place	2018 Suhl	Mixed team
Gold medal – first place	2019 Suhl	Individual
Gold medal – first place	2019 Suhl	Team
Bronze medal – third place	2018 Suhl	Team
World University Games
Gold medal – first place	2021 Chengdu	Individual
Silver medal – second place	2021 Chengdu	Mixed team
World University Championships
Gold medal – first place	2018 Kuala Lumpur	Team
Bronze medal – third place	2018 Kuala Lumpur	Individual

Elavenil Valarivan (born 2 August 1999) is an Indian sport shooter specialising in the 10 meter air rifle. She has represented India at several international shooting events, including the World Championships, World Cup, Asian Games, Asian Championships, and the 2020 and 2024 Summer Olympics. She was honored with the Arjuna Award by the Government of India in 2022.

In the 2026 Asian Games held in September 2026, she won silver medals in the women's 10 meter air rifle individual and team events.
