= 2023 Asian Shooting Championships =

Shooting event in South Korea

- Host city: Changwon, South Korea
- Dates: 24 October – 1 November 2023
- Main venue: Changwon Shooting Range

The 2023 Asian Shooting Championships were the 15th Asian Shooting Championships and took place from 22 October to 2 November 2023, at Changwon Shooting Range, Changwon, South Korea. 813 competitors from 30 countries took part in the competition. It was the Asian qualifying tournament for the 2024 Summer Olympics in Paris. This games was played in 102 events (46 Individual + 46 Team + 10 Mixed) consist of 46 (21+21+4) events in seniors, 46 (21+21+4) events in juniors and 10 (4+4+2) events in youth.

== Medal summary ==
=== Men ===
Event	Gold	Silver	Bronze
10 m air pistol	Zhang Yifan; China	Liu Jinyao; China	Sarabjot Singh; India
10 m air pistol team	China; Liu Jinyao; Zhang Bowen; Zhang Yifan	South Korea; Hong Su-hyeon; Lee Won-ho; Lim Ho-jin	Vietnam; Lại Công Minh; Phạm Quang Huy; Phan Công Minh
25 m rapid fire pistol	Lee Gun-hyeok; South Korea	Dai Yoshioka; Japan	Anish Bhanwala; India
25 m rapid fire pistol team	China; Li Yuehong; Liu Yangpan; Wang Xinjie	South Korea; Hong Suk-jin; Lee Gun-hyeok; Song Jong-ho	India; Anish Bhanwala; Vijayveer Sidhu; Adarsh Singh
25 m standard pistol	Youn Jae-yeon; South Korea	Wang Xinjie; China	Lee Gun-hyeok; South Korea
10 m air rifle	Sheng Lihao; China	Arjun Babuta; India	Naoya Okada; Japan
10 m air rifle team	India; Arjun Babuta; Hriday Hazarika; Divyansh Singh Panwar	China; Gao Qiang; Sheng Lihao; Yu Haonan	Japan; Masaya Endo; Naoya Okada; Atsushi Shimada
50 m rifle prone	Konstantin Malinovskiy; Kazakhstan	Husain Parray Zahid; India	Du Linshu; China
50 m rifle prone team	Kazakhstan; Konstantin Malinovskiy; Islam Satpayev; Yuriy Yurkov	China; Du Linshu; Tian Jiaming; Yu Hao	South Korea; Kim Jong-hyun; Kwon Jun-cheol; Mo Dai-seong
50 m rifle 3 positions	Aishwary Pratap Singh Tomar; India	Tian Jiaming; China	Du Linshu; China
50 m rifle 3 positions team	China; Du Linshu; Tian Jiaming; Yu Hao	India; Swapnil Kusale; Akhil Sheoran; Aishwary Pratap Singh Tomar	Japan; Takayuki Matsumoto; Naoya Okada; Atsushi Shimada
10 m running target	Assadbek Nazirkulyev; Kazakhstan	Kwak Yong-bin; South Korea	Nguyễn Tuấn Anh; Vietnam
10 m running target mixed	Kwak Yong-bin; South Korea	Jeong You-jin; South Korea	Ha Kwang-chul; South Korea
Trap	Qi Ying; China	Saeed Abusharib; Qatar	Babak Yeganeh; Iran
Trap team	Qatar; Saeed Abusharib; Rashid Hamad Al-Athba; Mohammed Al-Rumaihi	India; Kynan Chenai; Zoravar Singh Sandhu; Prithviraj Tondaiman	Iran; Mohammad Beiranvand; Mohammad Hossein Parvareshnia; Babak Yeganeh
Skeet	Rashid Saleh Al-Athba; Qatar	Kim Min-su; South Korea	Lee Meng-yuan; Chinese Taipei
Skeet team	India; Angad Vir Singh Bajwa; Gurjoat Siingh Khangura; Anantjeet Singh Naruka	South Korea; Cho Min-ki; Hwang Jung-soo; Kim Min-su	Kazakhstan; Alexandr Mukhamediyev; Alexandr Yechshenko; Eduard Yechshenko

=== Women ===
Event	Gold	Silver	Bronze
10 m air pistol	Oh Ye-jin; South Korea	Jiang Ranxin; China	Trịnh Thu Vinh; Vietnam
10 m air pistol team	South Korea; Choo Gae-un; Kim Bo-mi; Oh Ye-jin	Chinese Taipei; Liu Heng-yu; Wu Chia-ying; Yu Ai-wen	China; Jiang Ranxin; Li Xue; Lu Kaiman
25 m pistol	Liu Rui; China	Hanieh Rostamian; Iran	Zhao Nan; China
25 m pistol team	China; Feng Sixuan; Liu Rui; Zhao Nan	India; Manu Bhaker; Rhythm Sangwan; Esha Singh	Chinese Taipei; Tien Chia-chen; Tu Yi Yi-tzu; Wu Chia-ying
10 m air rifle	Kwon Eun-ji; South Korea	Tilottama Sen; India	Ramita Jindal; India
10 m air rifle team	China; Han Jiayu; Huang Yuting; Wang Zhilin	Singapore; Fernel Tan; Natanya Tan; Martina Veloso	India; Ramita Jindal; Shriyanka Sadangi; Tilottama Sen
50 m rifle prone	Lee Eun-seo; South Korea	Arina Altukhova; Kazakhstan	Xia Siyu; China
50 m rifle prone team	South Korea; Choi Ye-lin; Kim Bo-kyung; Lee Eun-seo	China; Han Jiayu; Xia Siyu; Zhang Qiongyue	Kazakhstan; Arina Altukhova; Yelizaveta Bezrukova; Alexandra Le
50 m rifle 3 positions	Lee Eun-seo; South Korea	Han Jiayu; China	Xia Siyu; China
50 m rifle 3 positions team	India; Ashi Chouksey; Ayushi Podder; Shriyanka Sadangi	Kazakhstan; Arina Altukhova; Yelizaveta Bezrukova; Alexandra Le	South Korea; Bae Sang-hee; Kim Je-hee; Lee Eun-seo
10 m running target	Zukhra Irnazarova; Kazakhstan	Nguyễn Thị Thu Hằng; Vietnam	Alexandra Saduakassova; Kazakhstan
10 m running target mixed	Amal Mohammed; Qatar	Alexandra Saduakassova; Kazakhstan	Zukhra Irnazarova; Kazakhstan
Trap	Ray Bassil; Lebanon	Cho Seon-ah; South Korea	Wang Xiaojing; China
Trap team	China; Li Qingnian; Wang Xiaojing; Zhang Xinqiu	South Korea; Cho Seon-ah; Kim Bo-kyung; Lee Bo-na	Kazakhstan; Mariya Dmitriyenko; Aizhan Dosmagambetova; Nargiza Sarmanova
Skeet	Wei Meng; China	Gao Jinmei; China	Jiang Yiting; China
Skeet team	China; Gao Jinmei; Jiang Yiting; Wei Meng	Kazakhstan; Zoya Kravchenko; Assem Orynbay; Olga Panarina	Thailand; Isarapa Imprasertsuk; Sutiya Jiewchaloemmit; Nutchaya Sutarporn

=== Mixed ===
Event	Gold	Silver	Bronze
10 m air pistol team	China; Liu Jinyao; Li Xue	India; Sarabjot Singh; Surbhi Rao	South Korea; Lee Won-ho; Kim Bo-mi
10 m air pistol team	China; Liu Jinyao; Li Xue	India; Sarabjot Singh; Surbhi Rao	Vietnam; Lại Công Minh; Nguyễn Thùy Trang
10 m air rifle team	China; Yu Haonan; Han Jiayu	India; Divyansh Singh Panwar; Ramita Jindal	South Korea; Park Ha-jun; Kwon Eun-ji
10 m air rifle team	China; Yu Haonan; Han Jiayu	India; Divyansh Singh Panwar; Ramita Jindal	Kazakhstan; Islam Satpayev; Alexandra Le
Trap team	India; Prithviraj Tondaiman; Manisha Keer	South Korea; Ahn Dae-myeong; Lee Bo-na	China; Qi Ying; Li Qingnian
Trap team	India; Prithviraj Tondaiman; Manisha Keer	South Korea; Ahn Dae-myeong; Lee Bo-na	Kuwait; Talal Al-Rashidi; Sarah Al-Hawal
Skeet team	India; Anantjeet Singh Naruka; Darshna Rathore	Kuwait; Abdullah Al-Rashidi; Eman Al-Shamaa	China; Wu Yunxuan; Gao Jinmei
Skeet team	India; Anantjeet Singh Naruka; Darshna Rathore	Kuwait; Abdullah Al-Rashidi; Eman Al-Shamaa	Qatar; Rashid Saleh Al-Athba; Reem Al-Sharshani

== Medal table ==
Rank	Nation	Gold	Silver	Bronze	Total
1	China	14	9	10	33
2	South Korea	9	9	6	24
3	India	6	8	5	19
4	Kazakhstan	4	4	6	14
5	Qatar	3	1	1	5
6	Lebanon	1	0	0	1
7	Vietnam	0	1	4	5
8	Japan	0	1	3	4
9	Chinese Taipei	0	1	2	3
9	Iran	0	1	2	3
11	Kuwait	0	1	1	2
12	Singapore	0	1	0	1
13	Thailand	0	0	1	1
Totals (13 entries)		37	37	41	115
