= Alexandra Le =

Kazakh sport shooter

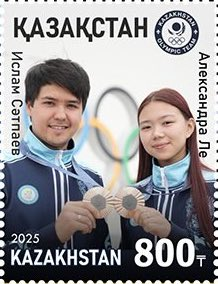
- Le (right) and Islam Satpayev as depicted on a 2025 Kazakh stamp

Personal information
- Born: 3 May 2004 (age 22) Almaty, Kazakhstan

Sport
- Country: Kazakhstan
- Sport: Shooting
- Events: 10 metre air rifle, 50-metre rifle three positions
- Club: Dynamo
- Coached by: Olga Dovgun, Veronika Skiba, Yuri Melsitov
Medal record
Women's shooting
Representing Kazakhstan
Olympic Games
Bronze medal – third place	2024 Paris	mixed 10 metre air rifle
World Championships
Bronze medal – third place	2025 Cairo	50 m rifle 3 positions team
ISSF World Cup
Gold medal – first place	2023 Jakarta	10 m air rifle team
Silver medal – second place	2023 Jakarta	50 m rifle 3 positions team
Bronze medal – third place	2023 Bhopal	10 m air rifle
ISSF Grand Prix
Gold medal – first place	2026 Shymkent	10 m air rifle
Asian Games
Bronze medal – third place	2022 Hangzhou	mixed 10 metre air rifle
Asian Championships
Silver medal – second place	2023 Changwon	50 m rifle 3 positions team
Bronze medal – third place	2023 Changwon	50 m rifle prone team
Bronze medal – third place	2023 Changwon	10 m air rifle mixed team
Bronze medal – third place	2024 Jakarta	50 m rifle prone
Bronze medal – third place	2025 Shymkent	50 m rifle prone team
Asian Airgun Championships
Bronze medal – third place	2022 Daegu	10 m air rifle
Bronze medal – third place	2022 Daegu	10 m air rifle team

Alexandra Georgievna Le (Russian: Александра Георгиевна Ле; born 3 May 2004) is a Kazakh sport shooter who competes in the 10 metre air rifle and 50-metre rifle three positions. With Islam Satpayev, she won the bronze medal in the mixed 10 metre air rifle team event at the 2024 Summer Olympics in Paris, the first medal awarded at those Games and Kazakhstan's first Olympic medal in shooting since 1996. She also reached the final of the women's 10 metre air rifle, finishing sixth, and was awarded the Order of Kurmet for her performance at the Games.

Born in Almaty, Le took up shooting while still at school and is coached by Olga Dovgun. In 2023 she won three medals at ISSF World Cup stages, including team gold in Jakarta, and a bronze with Satpayev at the 2022 Asian Games in Hangzhou. She earned her Olympic quota place at the 2024 Asian Championships in Jakarta. Since the Olympics she has won a team bronze at the 2025 ISSF World Shooting Championships and the women's 10 metre air rifle at the 2026 ISSF Grand Prix in Shymkent. Le married Matvey Timofeyev, a rifle shooter whom she met through the sport.

== Early life and education ==
Alexandra Georgiyevna Le was born on 3 May 2004 in Almaty, Kazakhstan. She was born to a Kazakhstani mother of Ukrainian origin, Tatyana Kopeyko, and a Kazakhstani father of Korean origin, Georgy, who died when she was six.

As a child she took up gymnastics, dance, and the martial arts of jiu-jitsu, judo and sambo for fitness. She later said that this had helped her shooting sport. A classmate introduced Le to shooting; she had previously enjoyed shooting galleries in amusement parks. According to her mother, she started in the fourth or fifth grade of school and aimed for the Olympic Games from her early competitions. In a December 2024 interview, Le described herself as having participated in the sport for seven years.

Le graduated from the Republican Sports College in Almaty. She went on to study Business Engineering at the Project Management Institute of Satbayev University.

== Career ==
=== Early career ===
Le has said that a third-place finish at the senior Kazakhstan shooting championships marked the start of her professional career. Her national coach is Olga Dovgun, the only woman to have shot a perfect 600 with a small-bore rifle at official international competition; her personal coaches are Veronika Skiba and Yuri Melsitov. She is a member of the Dynamo sports society. She is a member of the Dynamo sports society.

Le competed in the 2022 World Championships in Cairo, where her best placing was 20th, in both the Women's 10m Air Rifle and in the Women's 50m Rifle 3 Positions Team. At the 2022 Asian Airgun Championships in Daegu in November 2022, Le won bronze in the women's 10 metre air rifle, finishing third in the ranking match with 259.4. She also won bronze in the women's team event, with Yelizaveta Bezrukova and Arina Malinovskaya.

In February 2023, she won gold in the women's 10 metre air rifle team event at the 2023 ISSF World Cup stage in Jakarta, alongside Anastassiya Grigoryeva and Yelizaveta Bezrukova. At the same event she won silver in the women's 50-metre rifle three positions team event. In March 2023, Le won the bronze medal in the women's 10 metre air rifle at the World Cup stage in Bhopal, India, scoring 261.2 in the final. At the 2023 World championship in Baku her highest placing was 22nd in the Mixed 10m Air Rifle Team competition.

In September 2023, Le and Islam Satpayev won bronze in the mixed 10 metre air rifle team event at the 2022 Asian Games in Hangzhou. She later said the result gave her the confidence that she could win medals at a higher level. At the 2023 Asian Championships in Changwon, she won silver in the women's 50-metre rifle three positions team event and bronze in the 50-metre rifle prone team event, both with Arina Altukhova and Yelizaveta Bezrukova. She also won bronze in the mixed 10 metre air rifle team event at the same championships.

=== 2024 Summer Olympics ===
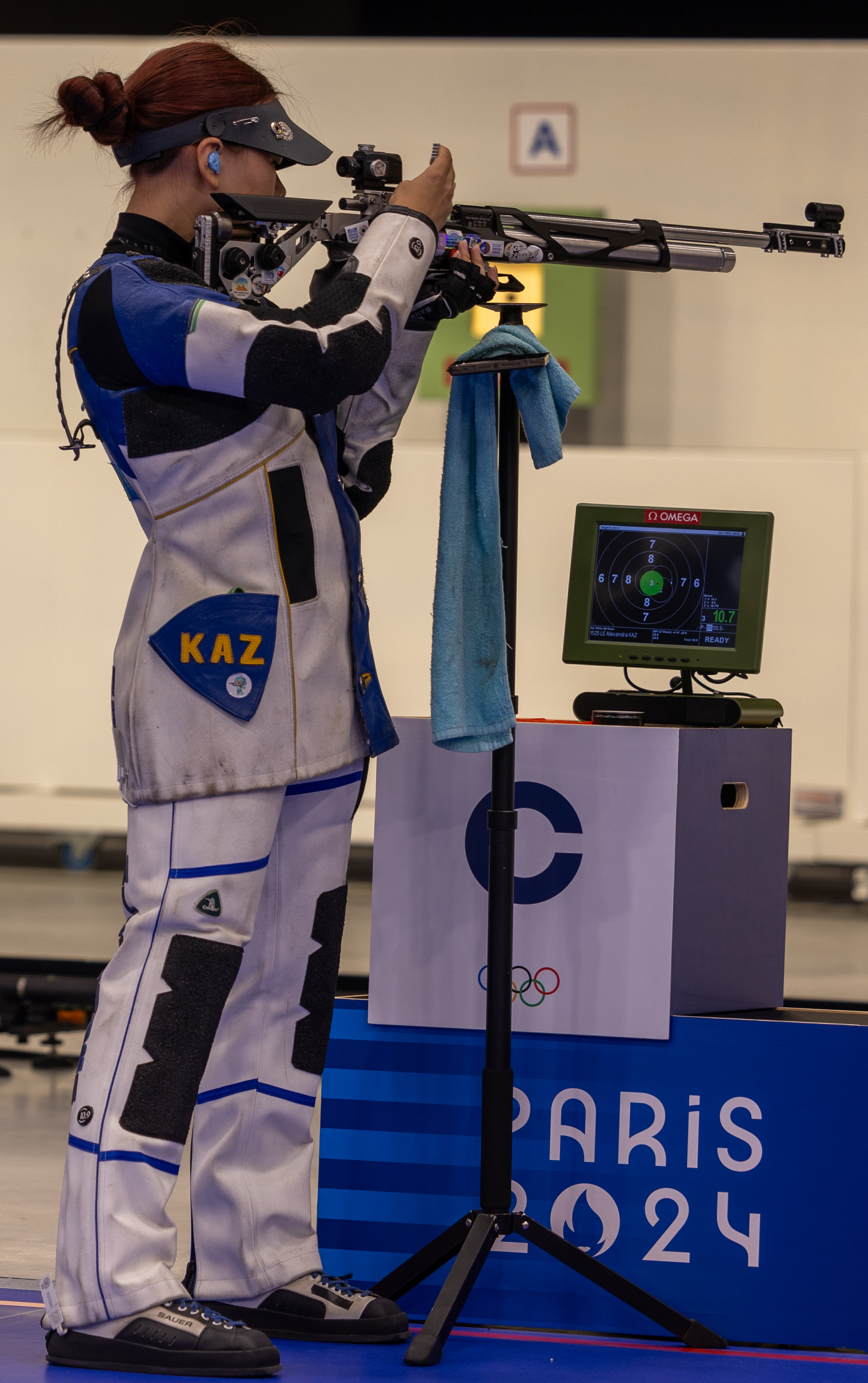
Le in competition at the 2024 Summer Olympics

Aged 19, Le finished seventh in the women's 50-metre rifle three positions final at the Asian Championships in Jakarta in January 2024, her first international final in that event. This earned her a quota place for the 2024 Summer Olympics. At the same championships, she won bronze in the women's 50-metre rifle prone, with a score of 618.4.

On 27 July 2024, the first day of competition at the Games, she and Satpayev placed third in qualifying for the mixed 10 metre air rifle team event with 630.8, 0.6 points behind South Korea, missing out on the gold medal match. In the bronze medal match they defeated Germany's Maximilian Ulbrich and Anna Janssen 17–5. It was the first medal awarded at the 2024 Games and Kazakhstan's first Olympic medal in shooting since 1996. Speaking after the event, Le said she had dreamed of competing at the Olympics since taking up the sport.

Le placed sixth in qualifying for the women's 10 metre air rifle, reaching the final. She came sixth in the final, with a score of 165.4. In the women's 50-metre rifle three positions she placed tenth with 587 and did not reach the final. She later attributed missing an individual medal to the pressure of feeling obliged to win one.

On returning to Kazakhstan, Le said that she had missed her home country and that "In your own country, victory is felt in a special way". She also said that the team's performances had shown "that Kazakhstanis are not only strong, but also accurate".

=== Later career ===
Le competed at World Cup stages in Buenos Aires, Lima and Munich in 2025; her best individual finish was tenth in the women's 50-metre rifle three positions in Munich. At the 2025 Asian Championships in Shymkent, her best individual result was eighth in the women's 50-metre rifle prone. She won bronze in the women's 50-metre rifle prone team event, with Yelizaveta Bezrukova and Arina Malinovskaya.

At the 2025 ISSF World Shooting Championships in Cairo, Le finished seventh in the women's 50-metre rifle prone, with a score of 623.0. She placed 18th in qualifying for the women's 50-metre rifle three positions, with a score of 586. She won the bronze medal in the team event with Arina Malinovskaya and Yelizaveta Bezrukova.

Le won the women's 10 metre air rifle at the 2026 ISSF Grand Prix in Shymkent, scoring 634.9 in qualifying and 254.7 in the final. At the 2026 Asian Games in Aichi–Nagoya, she finished fifth in the mixed 10 metre air rifle team event and 15th in the women's 10 metre air rifle.

== Recognition ==
Under a Kazakhstan national scheme, Le received about US$80,000 for her Olympic results: $75,000 for the bronze medal and $5,000 for sixth place. The akimat of Almaty also gave each of the city's Olympic medallists a car and a one-room flat. She was awarded the Order of Kurmet on 14 August 2024 for her performance at the Games.

According to Tengri News, during the Olympics she attracted widespread attention on social media. Satbayev University held a reception for her on her return in August 2024.

== Personal life ==
Le married Matvey Timofeyev, a rifle shooter whom she met through the sport. As of 2024, she lived in Almaty. Her interests include painting and reading. She has said that her goal is to compete at the 2028 Summer Olympics in Los Angeles, in both mixed and individual events.

== See also ==
- Ukrainians in Kazakhstan
- Koreans in Kazakhstan
- Ethnic demography of Kazakhstan
