= Esha Singh =

Indian sports shooter (born 2005)

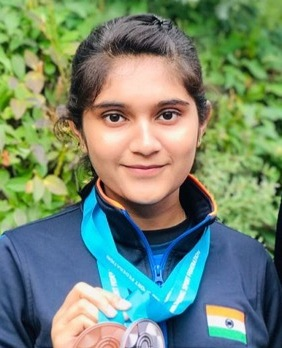

Personal information
- Born: 1 January 2005 (age 21) Hyderabad, India

Sport
- Sport: Shooting
- Events: 10 m air pistol 25 m pistol
Medal record
Women's shooting
Representing India
Event	1st	2nd	3rd
World Championships	3	2	1
Asian Games	1	4	0
Asian Championships	5	2	2
South Asian Games	1	0	0
World Cup	5	3	0
Junior World Championships	3	1	1
Junior Asian Championships	4	0	0
Junior World Cup	3	1	1
Total	25	13	5
Women's 10 m air pistol
World Championships
Gold medal – first place	2023 Baku	Mixed team
Silver medal – second place	2025 Cairo	Mixed team
Silver medal – second place	2025 Cairo	Team
Asian Games
Silver medal – second place	2022 Hangzhou	Individual
Silver medal – second place	2022 Hangzhou	Team
Asian Championships
Gold medal – first place	2024 Jakarta	Individual
Gold medal – first place	2024 Jakarta	Team
Gold medal – first place	2026 New Delhi	Individual
Gold medal – first place	2026 New Delhi	Team
South Asian Games
Gold medal – first place	2019 Kathmandu	Team
World Cup
Gold medal – first place	2022 Cairo	Team
Gold medal – first place	2025 Ningbo	Individual
Silver medal – second place	2022 Cairo	Individual
Silver medal – second place	2026 Munich	Individual
Junior World Championships
Gold medal – first place	2022 Cairo	Mixed team
Gold medal – first place	2022 Cairo	Team
Silver medal – second place	2021 Lima	Individual
Junior Asian Championships
Gold medal – first place	2019 Doha	Individual
Gold medal – first place	2019 Doha	Mixed team
Gold medal – first place	2019 Taoyuan	Individual
Gold medal – first place	2019 Taoyuan	Mixed team
Junior World Cup
Gold medal – first place	2022 Suhl	Individual
Gold medal – first place	2022 Suhl	Mixed team
Silver medal – second place	2019 Suhl	Individual
Bronze medal – third place	2019 Suhl	Mixed team
Women's 25 m pistol
World Championships
Gold medal – first place	2023 Baku	Team
Gold medal – first place	2026 Doha	Team
Bronze medal – third place	2025 Cairo	Individual
Asian Games
Gold medal – first place	2022 Hangzhou	Team
Silver medal – second place	2022 Hangzhou	Individual
Silver medal – second place	2026 Aichi–Nagoya	Individual
Asian Championships
Gold medal – first place	2026 New Delhi	Team
Silver medal – second place	2023 Changwon	Team
Silver medal – second place	2024 Jakarta	Team
Bronze medal – third place	2025 Shymkent	Team
Bronze medal – third place	2026 New Delhi	Individual
World Cup
Gold medal – first place	2022 Cairo	Team
Gold medal – first place	2026 Munich	Individual
Gold medal – first place	2026 Hangzhou	Individual
Silver medal – second place	2025 Buenos Aires	Individual
Junior World Championships
Gold medal – first place	2022 Cairo	Individual
Bronze medal – third place	2022 Cairo	Team
Junior World Cup
Gold medal – first place	2022 Suhl	Individual

Esha Singh (born 1 January 2005) is an Indian sports shooter. She represented India in the women's 25 m pistol event at the 2024 Paris Olympics. At the 2026 ISSF World Cup in Munich, Singh won the women's 25 m pistol gold medal with 43 hits in the final, setting both the senior and junior world records.

== Early life ==
Esha was born to Sachin Singh and Srilatha on 1 January 2005 in Hyderabad. Her father was a rally driver. Before she took up shooting, Singh tried go-karting, badminton, tennis and skating. A visit to the shooting range at Gachibowli Athletic Stadium in Hyderabad motivated her to choose air pistol. She trained at the stadium and simultaneously at her home, in the paper practice range built by her father. She later joined the Gun for Glory academy by former Olympic medallist Gagan Narang in Pune, Maharashtra.

== Career ==
=== Domestic ===
Singh began shooting in 2014 and in 2015, she became the Telangana state champion in 10m air pistol category. She then defeated the Commonwealth Games and Youth Olympics gold-medalist Manu Bhaker and multi-medalist Heena Sidhu in 62nd National Shooting Championships at Thiruvananthapuram, by winning gold in 10m air pistol event becoming the youngest champion in the senior category as a 13-year-old. She also won gold medals in youth and junior categories. At the second edition of Khelo India Youth Games in January 2019, Singh won gold medal in the 10m air pistol event in the under-17 category.

=== International ===
She won silver medal at the ISSF Junior World Cup at Suhl, Germany in 2019 and two gold medals at the Asian Junior championships in 10m air pistol women and 10m air pistol mixed team.

Singh won gold at the Asian Airgun Championships in Taoyuan, Taiwan in March–April, 2019 in the junior category of 10m air pistol event. In November 2019, Singh went on to win individual and mixed team gold medals at Asian Shooting Championship in Doha in 10m air pistol (junior) event.

Singh was also selected for India's core training team for the 2020 Summer Olympics, but failed to finish among the top two to qualify for the Olympics in the qualification event held in February 2020.

At the age of 18, she won four medals at the 2022 Asian Games, including the gold medal in the 25m pistol team event for India and an individual silver medal in the 25m pistol event. She became the 25m junior world champion at the 2022 ISSF World Shooting Championships in Cairo.

She clinched an Olympic quota berth in the 10m air pistol category for the 2024 Summer Olympics at the Asian Qualifier at Jakarta on 8 January 2024. She represented India in the women's 25 m pistol event at the 2024 Paris Olympics, finishing 18th in the qualification round.

On 4 February 2026, Esha won the gold medal in the 10m air pistol event at the Asian Shooting Championships, held at the Dr. Karni Singh Shooting Range. She secured the title with a final score of 239.8 points, winning her second individual gold medal in the event, having also won in 2024. Additionally, Esha led the Indian team to a gold medal in 10m air pistol team event as well alongside teammates Manu Bhaker and Suruchi Singh.

== Awards and nominations ==
Year	Award	Category	Result	Ref.
2023	Arjuna Award	Outstanding Performance in Sports	Won	
2024	Indian Sports Honours	Breakthrough Performance of the Year Female	Nominated	
