= Aishwary Pratap Singh Tomar =

Indian sport shooter (born 2001)

Personal information
- Born: 3 February 2001 (age 25) Khargone, Madhya Pradesh, India

Sport
- Sport: Shooting
- Event: 50 m rifle 3 positions
- Coached by: Joydeep Karmakar; Suma Shirur

Achievements and titles
- Personal bests: 597 (2025); 591 (2023); 362.5 (2025)
Medal record
Men's shooting
Representing India
Event	1st	2nd	3rd
World Championships	1	1	1
World Cup Final	0	1	0
Asian Games	1	2	1
Asian Championships	3	3	2
World Cup	1	1	1
Junior World Championships	1	1	0
Junior Asian Championships	0	0	1
Junior World Cup	1	0	0
World University Games	3	0	1
World University Championships	2	1	0
Total	13	10	7
Men's 50 m rifle 3 positions
World Championships
Gold medal – first place	2023 Baku	Team
Silver medal – second place	2025 Cairo	Individual
Bronze medal – third place	2026 Doha	Team
World Cup Final
Silver medal – second place	2025 Doha	Individual
Asian Games
Gold medal – first place	2022 Hangzhou	Team
Silver medal – second place	2022 Hangzhou	Individual
Silver medal – second place	2026 Aichi–Nagoya	Team
Bronze medal – third place	2022 Hangzhou	Individual
Asian Championships
Gold medal – first place	2023 Changwon	Individual
Gold medal – first place	2024 Jakarta	Team
Gold medal – first place	2025 Shymkent	Individual
Gold medal – first place	2026 New Delhi	Individual
Gold medal – first place	2026 New Delhi	Team
Silver medal – second place	2023 Changwon	Team
Silver medal – second place	2024 Jakarta	Individual
Silver medal – second place	2025 Shymkent	Team
Bronze medal – third place	2019 Doha	Individual
Bronze medal – third place	2019 Doha	Team
World Cup
Gold medal – first place	2021 New Delhi	Individual
Bronze medal – third place	2021 New Delhi	Mixed team
Junior World Championships
Gold medal – first place	2021 Lima	Individual
Silver medal – second place	2021 Lima	Mixed team
Junior World Cup
Gold medal – first place	2019 Suhl	Individual
World University Games
Gold medal – first place	2021 Chengdu	Individual
Bronze medal – third place	2021 Chengdu	Team
World University Championships
Gold medal – first place	2024 New Delhi	Mixed team
Gold medal – first place	2024 New Delhi	Team
Silver medal – second place	2024 New Delhi	Individual
Men's 10 m air rifle
World Cup
Silver medal – second place	2021 New Delhi	Team
Junior Asian Championships
Bronze medal – third place	2019 Taoyuan	Individual
World University Games
Gold medal – first place	2021 Chengdu	Individual
Gold medal – first place	2021 Chengdu	Team

Aishwary Pratap Singh Tomar (born 3 February 2001) is an Indian sport shooter. Tomar represented India in the 50 m rifle 3 positions event at the 2020 Tokyo Olympics and 2024 Paris Olympics.

== Early life ==
Tomar was born on 3 February 2001 in Ratanpur village, Khargone district, Madhya Pradesh, into a family of farmers, as the youngest of three children. He often went hunting with his father Veer Bahadur, a landlord, and learned about sport shooting from his cousin Navdeep Singh Rathore. Tomar started to receive training in 2015 at the Madhya Pradesh Shooting Academy in Bhopal.

== Career ==
Tomar won the bronze medal at the 2019 Asian Airgun Championships in the junior 10 metre air rifle event. At the 2019 ISSF Junior World Cup in Suhl, Tomar set the junior world record in the 50 metre rifle three positions with a score of 459.3 and won the gold medal.

Tomar won the bronze medal in 50 metre rifle three positions at the 2019 Asian Shooting Championships in Doha, scoring 449.1 in the final. He thus secured India's second 2020 Summer Olympics quota place in the event and 13th overall in shooting. He bagged bronze in the team event of the same discipline, along with Chain Singh and Parul Kumar.

Tomar bagged gold at the 2021 ISSF World Cup event in New Delhi with a score of 462.5 in men's 50 metre rifle three positions. He scored 155 points in kneeling and 310.5 in prone before the standing elimination round, and earned qualification for the 2020 Summer Olympics.

Tomar clinched gold in 50m Rifle three positions men's event with a new junior world record at the 2021 ISSF Junior World Championships held in Lima, Peru.

== Awards ==
- 2019: Eklavya Award by the Government of Madhya Pradesh (on National Sports Day)
- 2023: Arjuna Award
