= Islam Satpayev =

Kazakhstani sport shooter

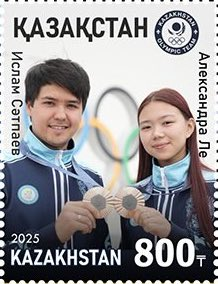
- Satpayev (left) and Alexandra Le at the 2024 Olympic Games as depicted on a 2025 Kazakh stamp

Personal information
- Born: 21 September 1998 (age 28) Almaty, Kazakhstan

Sport
- Country: Kazakhstan
- Sport: Shooting
- Event: 10 metre air rifle
Medal record
Men's shooting
Representing Kazakhstan
Olympic Games
Bronze medal – third place	2024 Paris	mixed 10 metre air rifle team
Asian Games
Bronze medal – third place	2022 Hangzhou	mixed 10 metre air rifle
Bronze medal – third place	2026 Aichi–Nagoya	50 m rifle 3 positions
Asian Championships
Gold medal – first place	2023 Changwon	50 m rifle prone team
Gold medal – first place	2025 Shymkent	10 m air rifle
Gold medal – first place	2026 New Delhi	50 m Rifle Prone
Gold medal – first place	2026 New Delhi	50 m Rifle Prone team
Silver medal – second place	2026 New Delhi	10m Air Rifle team
Bronze medal – third place	2023 Changwon	mixed 10 metre air rifle
Bronze medal – third place	2025 Shymkent	50 m rifle prone team
Bronze medal – third place	2026 New Delhi	50 m rifle 3 positions team
World Cup
Silver medal – second place	2023 Jakarta	10 m air rifle team
Silver medal – second place	2023 Jakarta	50 m rifle three position team
Bronze medal – third place	2022 Baku	10 m air rifle
Bronze medal – third place	2023 Jakarta	50 m rifle three position mixed team
World University Games
Silver medal – second place	2021 Chengdu	50 metre rifle three positions team
Bronze medal – third place	2021 Chengdu	10 metre air rifle team
- Updated on 28 July 2024

İslam Nazarqojaūly Sätpaev (Note: Often transliterated as Islam Nazargozhayevich Satpayev through a Russified Romanization of Ислам Назаргожаевич Сатпаев.) (Kazakh: Ислам Назарқожаұлы Сәтбаев; born 21 September 1998) is a Kazakh sport shooter. He won the bronze medal at the 2024 Summer Olympics in the mixed 10 metre air rifle team event, together with Alexandra Le.
