= Naoya Okada =

Japanese sports shooter (born 1990)

Personal information
- Nationality: Japanese
- Born: 10 October 1990 (age 35)

Sport
- Sport: Sports shooting
- Event: 10m Air Rifle
Medal record
Men's shooting
Representing Japan
World Cup
Gold medal – first place	2023 Jakarta	10m Air Rifle
Silver medal – second place	2023 Lima	10m Air Rifle
Asian Championships
Silver medal – second place	2026 New Delhi	50 m rifle 3 positions team
Bronze medal – third place	2023 Changwon	10m Air Rifle
Bronze medal – third place	2025 Shymkent	50 m rifle 3 positions
Bronze medal – third place	2026 New Delhi	10m Air Rifle
Bronze medal – third place	2026 New Delhi	10m Air Rifle team
Bronze medal – third place	2026 New Delhi	10m Air Rifle Mixed

Naoya Okada (岡田 直也, Okada Naoya; born 10 October 1990) is a Japanese sports shooter. He competed in the men's 10 metre air rifle event at the 2016, 2020 Summer Olympics.
