= Thongphaphum Vongsukdee =

Thai sport shooter

Personal information
- Nationality: Thai
- Born: June 13, 1999 (age 27) Suphan Buri Province, Thailand
- Weight: 60 kg (132 lb)

Sport
- Sport: Shooting
Medal record
Men's sport shooting
Representing Thailand
Southeast Asian Games
Gold medal – first place	2021 Hanoi	50 metre rifle three positions

Thongphaphum Vongsukdee (Thai: ทองผาภูมิ วงศ์สุขดี; born 13 June 1999) is a Thai shooter in the 50 metre rifle three positions and 10 metre air rifle. He represented Thailand in 2021 Southeast Asian Games, Asian Shooting Championships, and the 2024 Summer Olympics.

Thongphaphum got a gold medal in the men's 50 metre rifle three positions in the 2021 Southeast Asian Games. He competed in the 2024 Summer Olympics in Paris, representing Thailand in the men's 50m rifle 3 positions discipline.
