= Rudrankksh Patil =

Indian sport shooter (born 2003)

Personal information
- Full name: Rudrankksh Balasaheb Patil
- Born: 16 December 2003 (age 22) Thane, Maharashtra, India
- Height: 1.78 m (5 ft 10 in)

Sport
- Sport: Shooting
- Event: 10 m air rifle

Achievements and titles
- Highest world ranking: 1 (2022)
Medal record
Men's 10 m air rifle shooting
Representing India
Event	1st	2nd	3rd
World Championships	2	0	0
Asian Games	1	2	1
Asian Championships	5	0	2
World Cup	3	2	2
Junior World Championships	0	1	0
Junior World Cup	2	0	0
Total	13	5	5
World Championships
Gold medal – first place	2022 Cairo	Individual
Gold medal – first place	2022 Cairo	Team
Asian Games
Gold medal – first place	2022 Hangzhou	Team
Silver medal – second place	2026 Aichi–Nagoya	Team
Silver medal – second place	2026 Aichi–Nagoya	Team
Bronze medal – third place	2026 Aichi–Nagoya	Individual
Asian Championships
Gold medal – first place	2022 Daegu	Team
Gold medal – first place	2024 Jakarta	Mixed team
Gold medal – first place	2025 Shymkent	Team
Gold medal – first place	2026 New Delhi	Individual
Gold medal – first place	2026 New Delhi	Team
Bronze medal – third place	2024 Jakarta	Individual
Bronze medal – third place	2024 Jakarta	Team
World Cup
Gold medal – first place	2023 Cairo	Individual
Gold medal – first place	2023 Cairo	Mixed team
Gold medal – first place	2025 Buenos Aires	Individual
Silver medal – second place	2025 Buenos Aires	Mixed team
Silver medal – second place	2025 Lima	Mixed team
Bronze medal – third place	2023 Bhopal	Individual
Bronze medal – third place	2023 Bhopal	Mixed team
Junior World Championships
Silver medal – second place	2021 Lima	Individual
Junior World Cup
Gold medal – first place	2022 Suhl	Individual
Gold medal – first place	2022 Suhl	Team

Rudrankksh Balasaheb Patil (born 16 December 2003) is an Indian sport shooter specialising in the 10 m air rifle. He won the gold medal at the 2022 Word Championships, becoming only the second Indian world champion after Abhinav Bindra.

== Early life ==
Patil was born on 16 December 2003 in Thane, Maharashtra, India. Initially, he started with chess and football but later shifted to shooting. His father, Balasaheb Patil and mother, Hemangini Patil, encouraged him to take up shooting. He has completed his undergraduate degree from the University of Mumbai.

== Career ==
At the 2022 Asian Games at Hangzhou, Patil scored a world record score on way to winning India's first gold medal in the 10 m air pistol team event. He secured a 2024 Paris Olympics quota berth, after winning gold in the 10 m air rifle event at the 2022 World Championships in Cairo. Earlier in the 2022 Asian Championships in Daegu, he bagged first place in the 10m air rifle team event. To aid his preparations for Olympics, Gagan Narang, Olympic medallist and vice-president of Indian Olympic Association (IOA) helped him get a sponsored gun from Walther, which was presented to him at a press conference in Pune.
