= 2016 ISSF Junior World Cup =

Issf Junior World Cup

The 2016 ISSF Junior World Cup is the annual edition of the ISSF Junior World Cup, governed by the International Shooting Sport Federation.

== Men's results ==
=== Rifle events ===
==== Individual Results ====
50 metre rifle three positions			50 metre rifle prone			10 metre air rifle		
Suhl, Germany (April 29-May 6)			Suhl, Germany (April 29-May 6)			Suhl, Germany (April 29-May 6)		
1st place, gold medalist(s)	Istvan Peni (HUN)	458.6 FWRJ	1st place, gold medalist(s)	Istvan Peni (HUN)	202.7	1st place, gold medalist(s)	Maximilian Dallinger (GER)	207.9
2nd place, silver medalist(s)	Christoph Duerr (SUI)	445.1	2nd place, silver medalist(s)	Vegard Nordhagen (NOR)	202.6	2nd place, silver medalist(s)	Vladislav Fetisov (RUS)	204.5
3rd place, bronze medalist(s)	Manuel Luescher (SUI)	436.4	3rd place, bronze medalist(s)	Ludwig Wassman (SWE)	181.6	3rd place, bronze medalist(s)	Istvan Peni (HUN)	183.6
Gabala, Azerbaijan (September 16–23)			Gabala, Azerbaijan (September 16–23)			Gabala, Azerbaijan (September 16–23)		
1st place, gold medalist(s)	Benjamin Tingsrud Karlsen (NOR)	455.1	1st place, gold medalist(s)	Shubhankar Pramanick (IND)	205.5	1st place, gold medalist(s)	Filip Nepejchal (CZE)	206.1
2nd place, silver medalist(s)	Filip Nepejchal (CZE)	453.3	2nd place, silver medalist(s)	Filip Nepejchal (CZE)	205.2	2nd place, silver medalist(s)	Atsushi Shimada (JPN)	205.2
3rd place, bronze medalist(s)	Timur Akhmedzhanov (RUS)	440.3	3rd place, bronze medalist(s)	Dragomir Iordache (ROU)	185.1	3rd place, bronze medalist(s)	Arjun Babuta (IND)	183.6

==== Team Results ====
50 metre rifle three positions			50 metre rifle prone			10 metre air rifle		
Suhl, Germany (April 29-May 6)			Suhl, Germany (April 29-May 6)			Suhl, Germany (April 29-May 6)		
1st place, gold medalist(s)	(ITA) Riccardo Armiraglio Giacomo Maurina Giuseppe Pio Capano	3451 - 127x	1st place, gold medalist(s)	(NOR) Benjamin Tingsrud Karlsen Vegard Nordhagen Henrik Larsen	1851.0	1st place, gold medalist(s)	(HUN) Istvan Peni Peter Vas Casba Covacs	1865.2
2nd place, silver medalist(s)	(GER) Maximilian Dallinger Lukas Fischer Markus ABT	3448 - 144x	2nd place, silver medalist(s)	(RUS) Timur Akhmedzhanov Vladislav Fetisov Artem Filippov	1836.1	2nd place, silver medalist(s)	(ITA)Riccardo Armiraglio Alessio Barcucci Giuseppe Pio Capano	1861.5
3rd place, bronze medalist(s)	(RUS) Timur Akhmedzhanov Vladislav Fetisov Artem Filippov	3426 - 129x	3rd place, bronze medalist(s)	(CRO)Andrija Mikuljan Borna Petanjek Denis Tomasevic	1834.5	3rd place, bronze medalist(s)	(GER) Maximilian Dallinger Lukas Fischer Markus ABT	1860.2
Gabala, Azerbaijan (September 16–23)			Gabala, Azerbaijan (September 16–23)			Gabala, Azerbaijan (September 16–23)		
1st place, gold medalist(s)	No Team Event		1st place, gold medalist(s)	(NOR) Benjamin Tingsrud Karlsen Vegard Nordhagen Henrik Larsen	1845.0	1st place, gold medalist(s)	(IND) Pratik Borse Arjun Babuta Prashant	1849.9
2nd place, silver medalist(s)	No Team Event		2nd place, silver medalist(s)	(IND) 1 Shubhankar Pramanick Fateh Singh Dhillon Ajaey Nitish P	1824.6	2nd place, silver medalist(s)	(SIN)Mohmad Irwan Abdul Rahman Muhammad Izzat B Junaide Jian Hui SNG	1847.0
3rd place, bronze medalist(s)	No Team Event		3rd place, bronze medalist(s)	(IND) 2 Mayur Deva Bhanu Sarvesh Swaroop Shankar V Syed Araib Parvez	1820.7	3rd place, bronze medalist(s)	(JPN)Atshushi Shimada Akihito Shimizu Shuya Adachi	1846.8

=== Pistols Events ===
==== Individual Results ====
50 metre pistol			25 metre rapid fire pistol			10 metre air pistol			25 meter standard pistol			25 meter pistol		
Suhl, Germany (April 29-May 6)			Suhl, Germany (April 29-May 6)			Suhl, Germany (April 29-May 6)			Suhl, Germany (April 29-May 6)			Suhl, Germany (April 29-May 6)		
1st place, gold medalist(s)	Paolo Monna (ITA)	190.2	1st place, gold medalist(s)	Oskar Miliwek (POL)	29	1st place, gold medalist(s)	Paolo Monna (ITA)	198.8	1st place, gold medalist(s)	Rituraj Singh (IND)	569-12x	1st place, gold medalist(s)	Marvin Flueckiger (SUI)	580-17x
2nd place, silver medalist(s)	Simone Weiss (GER)	186.0	2nd place, silver medalist(s)	Sergei Evglevski (AUS)	20	2nd place, silver medalist(s)	Gvido Cvetkovs (LAT)	196.3	2nd place, silver medalist(s)	Clement Greffier (FRA)	561-12x	2nd place, silver medalist(s)	Clement Greffier (FRA)	577-19x
3rd place, bronze medalist(s)	Alessio Torracchi (ITA)	165.2	3rd place, bronze medalist(s)	Clement Greffier (FRA)	20 SO	3rd place, bronze medalist(s)	Artem Chernousov (RUS)	174.9	3rd place, bronze medalist(s)	Sergei Evglevski (AUS)	561-09x	3rd place, bronze medalist(s)	Yuriy Kolesnyk (UKR)	576-17x
Gabala, Azerbaijan (September 16–23)			Gabala, Azerbaijan (September 16–23)			Gabala, Azerbaijan (September 16–23)			Gabala, Azerbaijan (September 16–23)			Gabala, Azerbaijan (September 16–23)		
1st place, gold medalist(s)	Artem Chernousov (RUS)	182.9	1st place, gold medalist(s)	Rushiraj Barot (IND)	25	1st place, gold medalist(s)	Artem Chernousov (RUS)	199.7	1st place, gold medalist(s)	Sambhaji Zanzan Patil (IND)	562-13x	1st place, gold medalist(s)	Anhad Jawanda (IND)	586-21x
2nd place, silver medalist(s)	Anton Zanin (RUS)	181.8	2nd place, silver medalist(s)	Lukas Skoumal (CZE)	23	2nd place, silver medalist(s)	Anmol (IND)	197.5	2nd place, silver medalist(s)	Sergei Evglevski (AUS)	555-06x	2nd place, silver medalist(s)	Gurmeet (IND)	579-20x
3rd place, bronze medalist(s)	Alexander Bassariev (RUS)	163.4	3rd place, bronze medalist(s)	Sergei Evglevski (AUS)	20	3rd place, bronze medalist(s)	Evgeniu Brovoi (RUS)	175.8	3rd place, bronze medalist(s)	James Thomas Ashmore (AUS)	554-09x	3rd place, bronze medalist(s)	Sergei Evglevski (AUS)	574-12x

==== Team Results ====
50 metre pistol			25 metre rapid fire pistol			10 metre air pistol			25 meter standard pistol			25 meter pistol		
Suhl, Germany (April 29-May 6)			Suhl, Germany (April 29-May 6)			Suhl, Germany (April 29-May 6)			Suhl, Germany (April 29-May 6)			Suhl, Germany (April 29-May 6)		
1st place, gold medalist(s)	(RUS) Alexander Bassariev Anton Zannin Artem Chernousov	1630-24x	1st place, gold medalist(s)	(FRA) Clement Greffier Nicolas Thiel Guillaume Scire	1684-35x	1st place, gold medalist(s)	(ITA) Alessio Torracchi Paolo Monna Matteo Bertaiola	1711-49x	1st place, gold medalist(s)	(IND) Rituraj Singh Shivam Shukla Arjun Das	1661-32x	1st place, gold medalist(s)	(FRA) Clement Greffier Nicolas Thiel Edouard Dortomb	1716-43x
2nd place, silver medalist(s)	(ITA) Alessio Torracchi Paolo Monna Matteo Bertaiola	1616-18x	2nd place, silver medalist(s)	(IND) Shivam Shukla Rushiraj Barot Aadeithyaa Joahal	1675-28x	2nd place, silver medalist(s)	(RUS) Evgeniu Brovoi Anton Zannin Artem Chernousov	1710-40x	2nd place, silver medalist(s)	(FRA) Clement Greffier Nicolas Thiel Guillaume Scire	1659-26x	2nd place, silver medalist(s)	(UKR) Yuriy Kolesnyk Pavlo Krepostniak Maksym Horodynets	1715-47x
3rd place, bronze medalist(s)	(FRA) Remi Favier Edouard Dortomb Nicolas Thiel	1587-18x	3rd place, bronze medalist(s)	(RUS) Eger Ismakov Daniil Shikhov Alexander Petrov	1674-34x	3rd place, bronze medalist(s)	(IND) Gaurav Rana Hemendra Kushwah Arjun Das	1708-48x	3rd place, bronze medalist(s)	(AUS) Sergei Evglevski Thomas James Ashmore Bailey James Groves	1648-26x	3rd place, bronze medalist(s)	(AUS) Sergei Evglevski Thomas James Ashmore Bailey James Groves	1711-51x
Gabala, Azerbaijan (September 16–23)			Gabala, Azerbaijan 4(September 16–23)			Gabala, Azerbaijan (September 16–23)			Gabala, Azerbaijan (September 16–23)			Gabala, Azerbaijan (September 16–23)		
1st place, gold medalist(s)	(RUS) Alexander Bassariev Anton Zannin Artem Chernousov	1640-20x	1st place, gold medalist(s)	No Team Event		1st place, gold medalist(s)	(RUS) Alexander Bassariev Anton Zannin Artem Chernousov	1711-50x	1st place, gold medalist(s)	(IND) Rituraj Singh Gurmeet Sambhaji Zanzan Patil	1655-27x	1st place, gold medalist(s)	(IND) Anhad Jawanda Gurmeet Arjun Das	1725-47x
2nd place, silver medalist(s)	(IND) Anmol Nishant Bhardwaj Arjun Das	1600-16x	2nd place, silver medalist(s)	No Team Event		2nd place, silver medalist(s)	(IND) Gaurav Rana Hemendra Kushwah Saurabh Chaudhary	1702-35x	2nd place, silver medalist(s)	(AUS) Sergei Evglevski Thomas James Ashmore Hans Ben Hummer	1645-22x	2nd place, silver medalist(s)	(AUS) Sergei Evglevski Thomas James Ashmore Hans Ben Hummer	1702-32x
3rd place, bronze medalist(s)	(THA)Peechnat Khlaisuban Supanut Srijanfuea Donlaphat Promnukul	1502-14x	3rd place, bronze medalist(s)	No Team Event		3rd place, bronze medalist(s)	(GEO)Tsotne Machavariani Kako Mosulishvili Vladislav Mairovi	1694-39x	3rd place, bronze medalist(s)	(QAT)Ahmed Zayed Al-Shamari Mohammed Nasser Alyafei Rabeaa Al-Kuwari	1558-14x	3rd place, bronze medalist(s)	(QAT)Ahmed Zayed Al-Shamari Mohammed Nasser Alyafei Rabeaa Al-Kuwari	1661-35x

=== Shotgun Events ===
==== Individual Results ====
Trap		Double trap		Skeet	
Suhl, Germany (April 29-May 6)		Suhl, Germany (April 29-May 6)		Suhl, Germany (April 29-May 6)	
1st place, gold medalist(s)	Maxim Kabatskiy (RUS)	1st place, gold medalist(s)	Nathan Lee Xuereb (MLT)	1st place, gold medalist(s)	Yannik Hofmann (GER)
2nd place, silver medalist(s)	Josef Navaratil (CZE)	2nd place, silver medalist(s)	James Dedman (GBR)	2nd place, silver medalist(s)	Nicolas Vasiliou (CYP)
3rd place, bronze medalist(s)	Jack Wallace (AUS)	3rd place, bronze medalist(s)	Viacheslav Yukhimenko (RUS)	3rd place, bronze medalist(s)	Alexey Belov (RUS)
Gabala, Azerbaijan (September 16–23)		Gabala, Azerbaijan (September 16–23)		Gabala, Azerbaijan (September 16–23)	
1st place, gold medalist(s)	Jack Wallace (AUS)	1st place, gold medalist(s)	Qi Ying (CHN)	1st place, gold medalist(s)	Alexey Belov (RUS)
2nd place, silver medalist(s)	Simone D Ambrosio (ITA)	2nd place, silver medalist(s)	Aleksandr Filippov (RUS)	2nd place, silver medalist(s)	Edoardo Aloi (ITA)
3rd place, bronze medalist(s)	Matteo Marongiu (ITA)	3rd place, bronze medalist(s)	Su Run (CHN)	3rd place, bronze medalist(s)	Daniel Kocak (CZE)

==== Team Results ====
Trap			Double trap			Skeet		
Suhl, Germany (April 29-May 6)			Suhl, Germany (April 29-May 6)			Suhl, Germany (April 29-May 6)		
1st place, gold medalist(s)	(AUS) Jack Wallace Samuel John Bylsma Adam Joshua Bylsma	343	1st place, gold medalist(s)	(ITA) Andrea Galesso Jacopo Dal Moro Emanuele Buccolieri	395	1st place, gold medalist(s)	(DEN) Emil Kjelgaard Petersen Mikkel Petersen Alexander Karlsen	358
2nd place, silver medalist(s)	(ITA) 1 Simone Spina Simone D Ambrosio Nino Cuomo	340	2nd place, silver medalist(s)	(RUS) Viacheslav Yukhimenko Danil Zimarev Kamil Khusaenov	391	2nd place, silver medalist(s)	(FIN) Aleksi Ahokas Sami Aaltonen Esko Tiainen	353
3rd place, bronze medalist(s)	(FRA) Damien Ichard Jason Picaud Theo Denis	338	3rd place, bronze medalist(s)	(USA) Tyler Deyo Henry Garvey Jacob Hochhausler	391	3rd place, bronze medalist(s)	(RUS) Alexey Belov Aleksandr Krasnyatov Mikhail Sharapov	353
Gabala, Azerbaijan (September 16–23)			Gabala, Azerbaijan (September 16–23)			Gabala, Azerbaijan (September 16–23)		
1st place, gold medalist(s)	(ITA) 1 Matteo Marogiu Simone D Ambrosio Jacopo Dal Moro	360	1st place, gold medalist(s)	(CHN)Qi Ying Su Run Huang Xianghua	406	1st place, gold medalist(s)	(RUS) Alexey Belov Aleksandr Krasnyatov Sergey Demin	360
2nd place, silver medalist(s)	(AUS) Jack Wallace Samuel John Bylsma Adam Joshua Bylsma	348	2nd place, silver medalist(s)	(RUS) Viacheslav Yukhimenko Danil Zimarev Aleksandr Filippov	405	2nd place, silver medalist(s)	(CHN)Lu Jiahao Yang Zidong Lyu Jianlin	339
3rd place, bronze medalist(s)	(IND)Manavaditya Singh Rathore Lakshay Sheoran Kismat Chopra	347	3rd place, bronze medalist(s)	(IND)Priyanshu Pandey Bhowneesh Mendiratta Ahvar Rizvi	389	3rd place, bronze medalist(s)	(IND)Anant Jeet Singh Naruka Sukhbir Singh Harika Hamza Sheikh	337

== Women's Results ==
=== Rifle events ===
==== Individual Results ====
50 metre rifle three positions			50 m rifle prone			10 metre air rifle		
Suhl, Germany (April 29-May 6)			Suhl, Germany (April 29-May 6)			Suhl, Germany (April 29-May 6)		
1st place, gold medalist(s)	Tina Lehrich (GER)	453.8	1st place, gold medalist(s)	Natalia Kochanska (POL)	620.6	1st place, gold medalist(s)	Anastasiia Galashina (RUS)	206.9
2nd place, silver medalist(s)	Emilie Wintenberger (FRA)	451.5	2nd place, silver medalist(s)	Emilie Wintenberger (FRA)	619.5	2nd place, silver medalist(s)	Judith Gomez (FRA)	205.8
3rd place, bronze medalist(s)	Olga Efimova (RUS)	438.7	3rd place, bronze medalist(s)	Gaayathri Nithyanadam (IND)	618.4	3rd place, bronze medalist(s)	Tatiana Kharkova (RUS)	184.4
Gabala, Azerbaijan (September 16–23)			Gabala, Azerbaijan (September 16–23)			Gabala, Azerbaijan (September 16–23)		
1st place, gold medalist(s)	Nicola Foistova (CZE)	451.5	1st place, gold medalist(s)	Violetta Starostina (KAZ)	621.6	1st place, gold medalist(s)	Anastasiia Galashina (RUS)	210.6 FWRJ
2nd place, silver medalist(s)	Olga Efimova (RUS)	450.6	2nd place, silver medalist(s)	Anastasiia Galashina (RUS)	615.5	2nd place, silver medalist(s)	Tatiana Kharkova (RUS)	207.5
3rd place, bronze medalist(s)	Gaayathri Nithyanadam (IND)	438.9	3rd place, bronze medalist(s)	Jenny Stene (NOR)	615.4	3rd place, bronze medalist(s)	Martina Lindsay Veloso (SIN)	186.0

==== Team Results ====
50 metre rifle three positions			50 m rifle prone			10 metre air rifle		
Suhl, Germany (April 29-May 6)			Suhl, Germany (April 29-May 6)			Suhl, Germany (April 29-May 6)		
1st place, gold medalist(s)	(FIN) 2 Emmi Hyrkas Henna Viljanen Saana Peltonen	1715-69x	1st place, gold medalist(s)	(IND) Gaayathri Nithyanadam Sonika Ayushi Podder	1846.6	1st place, gold medalist(s)	(RUS) Anastasiia Galashina Tatiana Kharkova Olga Efimova	1239.0
2nd place, silver medalist(s)	(FRA) Emilie Wintenberger Manon Simon Ines Niewada	1710-63x	2nd place, silver medalist(s)	(FRA) Emilie Wintenberger Julie Milliere Ines Niewada	1841.7	2nd place, silver medalist(s)	(IND) Ashi Rastogi Dilreen Gill Prachi Gadkari	1238.8
3rd place, bronze medalist(s)	(POL) Natalia Kochanska Katarzyna Komorowska Klaudia Tomaszewska	1705-6x	3rd place, bronze medalist(s)	(POL) Natalia Kochanska Katarzyna Komorowska Klaudia Tomaszewska	1836.3	3rd place, bronze medalist(s)	(SIN) 2 Tessa Neo Martina Lindsay Veloso Qian Xiu Adele Tan	1236.6
Gabala, Azerbaijan (September 16–23)				Gabala, Azerbaijan (September 16–23)			Gabala, Azerbaijan (September 16–23)	
1st place, gold medalist(s)	(NOR)Jenny Vatne Jenny Stene Regine Nesheim	1722-67x	1st place, gold medalist(s)	(NOR)Jenny Vatne Jenny Stene Regine Nesheim	1835.2	1st place, gold medalist(s)	(RUS) Anastasiia Galashina Tatiana Kharkova Daria Boldinova	1245.5
2nd place, silver medalist(s)	(RUS) Anastasiia Galashina Tatiana Kharkova Daria Boldinova	1719-57x	2nd place, silver medalist(s)	(RUS) Anastasiia Galashina Tatiana Kharkova Olga Efimova	1835.2	2nd place, silver medalist(s)	(SIN) 1 Martina Lindsay Veloso Nurul Syafiqa Binte Nassaruddin Ho Xiu Yi	1240.5
3rd place, bronze medalist(s)	(IND) Gaayathri Nithyanadam Sonika Aditi Singh	1696-58x	3rd place, bronze medalist(s)	(IND) Gaayathri Nithyanadam Sonika Ayushi Podder	1834.8	3rd place, bronze medalist(s)	(IND) 1 Ashi Rastogi Dilreen Gill Geetaksmi Dixit	1234.6

=== Pistols Events ===
==== Individual Results ====
25 metre pistol		10 metre air pistol		
Suhl, Germany (April 29-May 6)		Suhl, Germany (April 29-May 6)		
1st place, gold medalist(s)	Michelle Skeries (GER)	1st place, gold medalist(s)	Anna Korakaki (GRE)	200.6
2nd place, silver medalist(s)	Anna Korakaki (GRE)	2nd place, silver medalist(s)	Yashaswini Singh Deswal (IND)	197.7
3rd place, bronze medalist(s)	Agate Rasmane (LAT)	3rd place, bronze medalist(s)	Michelle Skeries (GER)	176.2
Gabala, Azerbaijan (September 16–23)		Gabala, Azerbaijan (September 16–23)		
1st place, gold medalist(s)	Margarita Lomova (RUS)	1st place, gold medalist(s)	Margarita Lomova (RUS)	198.7
2nd place, silver medalist(s)	Miroslava Micheva (BUL)	2nd place, silver medalist(s)	Anna Dedova (CZE)	198.6
3rd place, bronze medalist(s)	Anna Dedova (CZE)	3rd place, bronze medalist(s)	Afaf Elhodhod (EGY)	177.0

==== Team Results ====
25 metre pistol			10 metre air pistol		
Suhl, Germany (April 29-May 6)			Suhl, Germany (April 29-May 6)		
1st place, gold medalist(s)	(RUS)Margarita Lomova Natalia Ordina Irina Serebryanskaya	1708-38x	1st place, gold medalist(s)	(GER) 1 Teresa Gross Michelle Skeries Susanne Ross	1129-33x
2nd place, silver medalist(s)	(GER) 1 Teresa Gross Michelle Skeries Lisa Schnaidt	1698-45x	2nd place, silver medalist(s)	(IND) Malaika Goel Yashaswani Singh Deswal Gauri Sheoran	1122-23x
3rd place, bronze medalist(s)	(IND)Sanjana Sehrawat Chinki Yadav Gauri Sheoran	1695-28x	3rd place, bronze medalist(s)	(RUS) Margarita Lomova Natalia Ordina Irina Serebryanskaya	1117-24x
Gabala, Azerbaijan (September 16–23)			Gabala, Azerbaijan (September 16–23)		
1st place, gold medalist(s)	(IND)Sanjana Sehrawat Chinki Yadav Gauri Sheoran	1701-31x	1st place, gold medalist(s)	(IND) Malaika Goel Yashaswani Singh Deswal Harshada Nithave	1122-26x
2nd place, silver medalist(s)	(THA) 1 Princhuda Methaweewong Warunyapha Kaewngoen Somkamol Sucharitjivavongse	1614-24x	2nd place, silver medalist(s)	(TUR)Elif Kirklar Asli Over Beyza Yasemin Yilmaz	1104-14x
3rd place, bronze medalist(s)	(THA) 2 Sommanus Sucharitjivavongse Somsuda Sucharitjivavongse Kankanit Tingnga	976-04 DNF	3rd place, bronze medalist(s)	(UZB)Muslimakhon Yuldasheva Sitora Ergashboeva Kamilla Ravshanbekova	1086-16x

=== Shotgun Events ===
==== Individual Results ====
Trap			Skeet
Suhl, Germany (April 29-May 6)			Suhl, Germany (April 29-May 6)
1st place, gold medalist(s)	Isabella Cristiani (ITA)	1st place, gold medalist(s)	Katharina Monika Jacob (USA)
2nd place, silver medalist(s)	Maria Lucia Palmitessa (ITA)	2nd place, silver medalist(s)	Niina Aaltonen (FIN)
3rd place, bronze medalist(s)	Stephanie Pile (AUS)	3rd place, bronze medalist(s)	Noemie Battault (FRA)
Gabala, Azerbaijan (September 16–23)			Gabala, Azerbaijan (September 16–23)
1st place, gold medalist(s)	Wang Chunchun (CHN)	1st place, gold medalist(s)	Alina Fazylzyanova (RUS)
2nd place, silver medalist(s)	Yulia Tugolukova (RUS)	2nd place, silver medalist(s)	Zhao Anni (CHN)
3rd place, bronze medalist(s)	Maria Lucia Palmitessa (ITA)	3rd place, bronze medalist(s)	Nur Banu Ozpak (TUR)

==== Team Results ====
Trap				Skeet	
Suhl, Germany (April 29-May 6)				Suhl, Germany (April 29-May 6)	
1st place, gold medalist(s)	(ITA) 2 Maria Lucia Palmitessa Isabella Cristiani Alessia Iezzi	198	1st place, gold medalist(s)	(USA) Katharina Monika Jacob Samantha Simonton Sydney Carson	200
2nd place, silver medalist(s)	(RUS)Nataliya Chistova Iuliia Saveleva Yulia Tugolukova	186	2nd place, silver medalist(s)	(RUS)Alina Fazylzyanova Regina Shakirova Margarita Gevorkian	194
3rd place, bronze medalist(s)	(GER) 1 Bettina Valdorf Kathrin Murche Sarah Bindrich	186	3rd place, bronze medalist(s)	(TUR) Nur Banu Ozpak Izel Aydin Deniz Ustundag	188
Gabala, Azerbaijan (September 16–23)				Gabala, Azerbaijan (September 16–23)	
1st place, gold medalist(s)	(RUS)Anna Zhemkova Iuliia Saveleva Yulia Tugolukova	198	1st place, gold medalist(s)	(TUR) Nur Banu Ozpak Izel Aydin Deniz Ustundag	202
2nd place, silver medalist(s)	(CHN)Wang Chunchun Jing Xinyao Zhang Ting	193	2nd place, silver medalist(s)	(CHN)Che Yufei Zhao Anni Chen Lulu	192
3rd place, bronze medalist(s)	(IND)Pragati Dubey Soumya Gupta Manisha Keer	176	3rd place, bronze medalist(s)	(RUS)Alina Fazylzyanova Iullia Menshenina Margarita Gevorkian	191

== Medal table ==
Rank	Country	Gold	Silver	Bronze	Total
1	Russia	17	15	13	45
2	India	12	9	13	34
3	Italy	8	6	3	17
4	Germany	5	3	3	11
5	Norway	5	1	1	7
6	China	3	4	1	8
7	Hungary	3	0	1	4
8	France	2	8	4	14
9	Australia	2	5	8	15
10	Czech Republic	2	5	2	9
11	Poland	2	0	2	4
12	United States	2	0	1	3
13	Finland	1	2	0	3
14	Turkey	1	1	2	4
15	Switzerland	1	1	1	3
16	Greece	1	1	0	2
17	Denmark	1	0	0	1
17	Kazakhstan	1	0	0	1
17	Malta	1	0	0	1
20	Singapore	0	2	2	4
21	Thailand	0	1	2	3
22	Latvia	0	1	1	2
22	Japan	0	1	1	2
22	Ukraine	0	1	1	2
25	Cyprus	0	1	0	1
25	Bulgaria	0	1	0	1
25	United Kingdom	0	1	0	1
28	Qatar	0	0	2	2
29	Croatia	0	0	1	1
29	Egypt	0	0	1	1
29	Georgia	0	0	1	1
29	Romania	0	0	1	1
29	Uzbekistan	0	0	1	1
29	Sweden	0	0	1	1
Total	34	70	70	70	210
