= 2017 ISSF Junior World Championships =

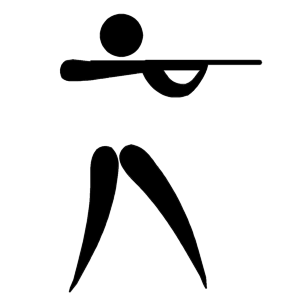
- Location: Suhl, Germany; Moscow, Russia
- Dates: 22 June – 29 June 2017; 30 August – 11 September 2017

The 2017 ISSF Junior World Championships was held in Suhl, Germany for Rifle, Pistol and Target Sprint from 22 June to 29 June 2017 and in Moscow, Russia for Shotgun from 30 August to 11 September 2017.

== Results ==
=== Rifle/Pistol ===
==== Men ====
| Event | Gold | | Silver | | Bronze | |
|---|---|---|---|---|---|---|
| Event | Athlete | Score | Athlete | Score | Athlete | Score |
| 10m Air Rifle | Miran Marcic (CRO) | 246.6 | Liu Yukun (CHN) | 246.5 | Borna Petanjek (CRO) | 225.8 |
| 10m Air Rifle Team | Japan; Atsushi Shimada; Masaya Endo; Akihito Shimizu | 1873.4 WRJ | China; Liu Yukun; Chen Tianhao; Zhang Changhong | 1873.3 | Croatia; Borna Petanjek; Miran Maricic; Andrija Mikuljan | 1870.7 |
| 50m Rifle Prone | Cristian Friman (FIN) | 246.4 SO 10.4 | Dragomir Iordache (ROU) | 246.4 SO 9.8 | Liu Yukun (CHN) | 225.5 |
| 50m Rifle Prone Team | Austria; Andreas Thum; Stefan Wadlegger; Patrick Diem | 1865.6 WRJ | Norway; Henrik Larsen; Jon-Hermann Hegg; Benjamin Tingsrud Karlsen | 1858.0 | Russia; Andrei Golokov; Evgeniy Ishchenko; Ilia Marsov | 1855.8 |
| 50m Rifle 3 Position | Liu Yukun (CHN) | 456.4 SO 10.3 | Filip Nepejchal (CZE) | 456.4 SO 8.7 | Henrik Larsen (NOR) | 445.4 |
| 50m Rifle 3 Position Team | Hungary; Istvan Peni; Peter Vas; Zalan Peklar | 3512 - 178x WRJ | Croatia; Borna Petanjek; Denis Tomašević; Andrija Mikuljan | 3481 - 153x | Finland; Sebastian Langstrom; Cristian Friman; Matias Kiuru | 3481 - 153x |
| 10m Air Pistol | Choe Boram (KOR) | 241.1 WRJ | Pavlo Korostylov (UKR) | 239.9 | Paolo Monna (ITA) | 218.3 |
| 10m Air Pistol Team | Russia; Aleksandr Petrov; Anton Aristarkhov; Mikhail Isakov | 1724-46x | South Korea; Sung Yunho; Choe Boram; Cho Yeongjae | 1720-53x | India; Saurabh Chaudhary; Anmol; Arjun Singh Cheema | 1718-46x |
| 25m Pistol | Pavlo Korostylov (UKR) | 590 - 19x EQWRJ | Anish Bhanwala (IND) | 589-23x | Zang Jueming (CHN) | 582-25x |
| 25m Pistol Team | India; Anish Bhanwala; Anhad Jawanda; Shivam Shukla | 1733 - 53x | South Korea; Lee Hyo Yeon; Lee Jaekyoon; Cho Yeongjae | 1732 - 52x | China; Cao Jiahao; Cheng Zhipeng; Zhang Jueming | 1731 - 57x |
| 25m Rapid Fire Pistol | Pavlo Korostylov (UKR) | 26 | Jang Ji Won (PRK) | 25 | Cheng Zhipeng (CHN) | 22 |
| 25m Rapid Fire Pistol Team | Ukraine; Pavlo Korostylov; Maksym Horodynets; Denys Vorona | 1722 - 44x WRJ | China; Cao Jiahao; Cheng Zhipeng; Zhang Jueming | 1721 - 42x | India; Anish Bhanwala; Anhad Jawanda; Shivam Shukla | 1711 - 51x |
| 25m Standard Pistol | Anish Bhanwala (IND) | 579-14x WRJ | Florian Peter (GER) | 572-13x | Pavlo Korostylov (UKR) | 570-14x |
| 25m Standard Pistol Men | China; Cao Jiahao; Cheng Zhipeng; Zhang Jueming | 1694-36x | India; Anish Bhanwala; Anhad Jawanda; Shabhaji Zanzan Patil | 1687-38x | France; Nicolas Thiel; Clement Greffier; Edouard Dortomb | 1678-29x |
| 50m Pistol | Wang Zhehao (CHN) | 232.6 WRJ | Anton Aristarkhov (RUS) | 229.7 | Aleksandr Petrov (RUS) | 206.2 |
| 50m Pistol Team | Russia; Aleksandr Petrov; Anton Aristarkhov; Mikhail Isakov | 1653-30x | Germany; Aleksandar Todorov; Robin Walter; Glenn-Niklas Simmank | 1629-20x | South Korea; Sung Yunho; Choe Boram; Cho Yeongjae | 1624-18x |

==== Women ====
| Event | Gold | | Silver | | Bronze | |
|---|---|---|---|---|---|---|
| Event | Athlete | Score | Athlete | Score | Athlete | Score |
| 10m Air Rifle | Zhu Yingjie (CHN) | 250.3 | Anna Janssen (GER) | 249.0 | Chen Yimei (CHN) | 227.7 |
| 10m Air Rifle Team | China; Chen Yimei; Zhu Yingjie; Gao Mingwei | 1262.1 WRJ | Singapore; Ho Xiu Yi; Tan Qian Xiu Adele; Martina Lindsay Veloso | 1247.1 | Germany; Anna Janssen; Johanna Teresa Tripp; Jana Heck | 1244.7 |
| 50m Rifle Prone | Katrina Kolarikova (CZE) | 624.9 WRJ | Anastasia Galashina (RUS) | 621.6 | Jeanette Hegg Duestad (NOR) | 620.6 |
| 50m Rifle Prone Team | Norway; Jeanette Hegg Duestad; Jenny Stene; Regine Nesheim | 1859.7 WRJ | United States; Morgan Phillips; Rachel Garner; Virginia Thrasher | 1852.3 | China; Peng Xinyi; Zhu Yingjie; Gao Ying | 1848.0 |
| 50m Rifle 3 Position | Zhu Yingjie (CHN) | 455.3 | Peng Xinyi (CHN) | 455.1 | Gao Ying (CHN) | 443.7 |
| 50m Rifle 3 Position Team | China; Peng Xinyi; Zhu Yingjie; Gao Ying | 1752-85x WRJ | Ukraine; Vidyaslava Koval; Anna Ilina; Viktoriya Sukhorukova | 1741-69x | United States; Morgan Phillips; Rachel Garner; Virginia Thrasher | 1739-79x |
| 10m Air Pistol | Yashaswini Singh Deswal (IND) | 235.8 EWRJ | Kim Woori (KOR) | 231.8 | Giulia Campostrini (ITA) | 212.1 |
| 10m Air Pistol Team | Hungary; Veronika Major; Viktoria Egri; Vivien Nagi | 1128-26x | United States; Sarah Eungee Choe; Katelyn Morgan Abeln; Kellie Foster | 1128-26x | South Korea; Jun Minju; Kim Woori; Kim Soeun | 1126-20x |
| 25m Pistol | Cao Lija (CHN) | 36 | Miroslava Mincheva (BUL) | 35 | Chen Yan (CHN) | 29 |
| 25m Pistol Team | China; Chen Yan; Cao Lija; Zhou Ying | 1734 - 58x WRJ | Thailand; Kanyakorn Hirunphoem; Viramon Kidran; Luxciga Srintivoravong | 1713 - 44x | India; Muskan; Chinki Yadav; Gauri Sheoran | 1711 - 45x |

=== Target Sprint ===
==== Men ====
| Event | Gold | | Silver | | Bronze | |
|---|---|---|---|---|---|---|
| Event | Athlete | Time | Athlete | Time | Athlete | Time |
| Individual | Sven Mueller (GER) | 04:37,6 | Felix Elsner (GER) | 04:39,5 | Macel Julian W Anger (GER) | 04:40,8 |

==== Women ====
| Event | Gold | | Silver | | Bronze | |
|---|---|---|---|---|---|---|
| Event | Athlete | Time | Athlete | Time | Athlete | Time |
| Individual | Madlen Guggenmos (GER) | 05:08,7 | Annika Barbara Kroiss (GER) | 05:26,3 | Lilith-Sophie Grupe (GER) | 05:30,5 |

=== Shotgun ===
==== Men ====
| Event | Gold | | Silver | | Bronze | |
|---|---|---|---|---|---|---|
| Event | Athlete | Score | Athlete | Score | Athlete | Score |
| Trap | Clement Bourgue (FRA) | 43 | Matteo Marongiu (ITA) | 42 | Jack Wallace (AUS) | 31 |
| Trap Team | Australia; Mitchell Iles-Crevatin; Jack Wallace; Adam Joshua Bylsma | 351 | Italy; Emaniele Buccolieri; Matteo Marongiu; Teo Petroni | 345 | United States; Ryne Barfield; Dale Royer; Logan John Mountain | 343 |
| Double Trap | James Dedman (GBR) | 67 | Ahvar Rizvi (IND) | 66 | Qi Ying (CHN) | 46 |
| Double Trap Team | India; Ahvar Rizvi; Shapath Bharadwaj; Shardul Vihan | 401 | Italy; Jacopo Dupre de Foresta; Eraldo Apolloni; Marco Carli | 389 | China; Qi Ying; Zhang Changshuai; Cao Xudong | 387 |
| Skeet | Emil Petersen (DEN) | 54 | Elia Sdruccioli (ITA) | 53 | Nicolas Vasiliou (CYP) | 41 |
| Skeet Team | Italy; Elia Sdruccioli; Valerio Palmucci; Erik Pittini | 353 | Turkey; Kemal Madencioglu; Salih Hafiz; Onur Atak | 348 | United States; Nic Moschetti; Elijah Ellis; Eli Christman | 345 |

==== Women ====
| Event | Gold | | Silver | | Bronze | |
|---|---|---|---|---|---|---|
| Event | Athlete | Score | Athlete | Score | Athlete | Score |
| Trap | Maria Lucia Palmitessa (ITA) | 40 | Luliia Saveleva (RUS) | 39 | Diana Ghilarducci (ITA) | 26 |
| Trap Team | Italy; Maria Lucia Palmitessa; Diana Ghilarducci; Greta Luppi | 200 | Russia; Luliia Saveleva; Polina Kniazeva; Angelina Rudneva | 191 | United States; Emma Lee Williams; Joyce Elizabeth Hunsaker; Emily Hampson | 187 |
| Skeet | Katharina Monika Jacob (USA) | 48 WRJ | Austen Jewell Smith (USA) | 44 | Samantha Simonton (USA) | 37 |
| Skeet Team | United States; Samantha Simonton; Katharina Monika Jacob; Austen Jewell Smith | 211 WRJ | Czech Republic; Hana Adámková; Anna Sindelarova; Zuzana Zaoralova | 193 | Germany; Eva-Tamara Reichert; Maria Kalix; Valentina Umhöfer | 191 |

== Medal table ==
=== Rifle/Pistol ===
| Rank | Nation | Gold | Silver | Bronze | Total |
|---|---|---|---|---|---|
| 1 | China (CHN) | 9 | 4 | 10 | 23 |
| 2 | India (IND) | 4 | 3 | 3 | 10 |
| 3 | Italy (ITA) | 3 | 4 | 3 | 10 |
| 4 | Ukraine (UKR) | 3 | 2 | 1 | 6 |
| 5 | Germany (GER) | 2 | 5 | 4 | 11 |
| 6 | Russia (RUS) | 2 | 4 | 2 | 8 |
| 7 | United States (USA) | 2 | 3 | 5 | 10 |
| 8 | Hungary (HUN) | 2 | 0 | 0 | 2 |
| 9 | South Korea (KOR) | 1 | 3 | 2 | 6 |
| 10 | Czech Republic (CZE) | 1 | 2 | 0 | 3 |
| 11 | Croatia (CRO) | 1 | 1 | 2 | 4 |
| 11 | Norway (NOR) | 1 | 1 | 2 | 4 |
| 13 | Australia (AUS) | 1 | 0 | 1 | 2 |
| 13 | Finland (FIN) | 1 | 0 | 1 | 2 |
| 13 | France (FRA) | 1 | 0 | 1 | 2 |
| 16 | Austria (AUT) | 1 | 0 | 0 | 1 |
| 16 | Denmark (DEN) | 1 | 0 | 0 | 1 |
| 16 | Great Britain (GBR) | 1 | 0 | 0 | 1 |
| 16 | Japan (JPN) | 1 | 0 | 0 | 1 |
| 20 | Bulgaria (BUL) | 0 | 1 | 0 | 1 |
| 20 | North Korea (PRK) | 0 | 1 | 0 | 1 |
| 20 | Romania (ROU) | 0 | 1 | 0 | 1 |
| 20 | Singapore (SGP) | 0 | 1 | 0 | 1 |
| 20 | Thailand (THA) | 0 | 1 | 0 | 1 |
| 20 | Turkey (TUR) | 0 | 1 | 0 | 1 |
| 26 | Cyprus (CYP) | 0 | 0 | 1 | 1 |
| Totals (26 entries) | | 38 | 38 | 38 | 114 |
