= Thomas George Karimpanal =

Indian sports shooter (born 1997)

Thomas George Karimpanal (Thommen)
Personal information
- Full name: Thomas George Karimpanal
- National team: India
- Citizenship: Indian
- Born: Thomas George; 13 July 1997 (age 28) Kanjirappally, Kottayam
- Education: O. P. Jindal Global University
- Occupation: Pistol Shooter
- Years active: 2013
- Height: 164.5 cm (5 ft 5 in) (2018)
- Weight: 68 kg (150 lb) (2018)

Sport
- Country: India
- Sport: Pistol Shooting
- Event(s): 25 Meter Standard Pistol 25 Meter Center Fire Pistol; 25 Meter Rapid Fire Pistol
- Club: ISSF, NRAI
- Now coaching: Prof. V. C. James; Vipindas Vasudevan

Achievements and titles
- Personal best(s): Ranked: 1 (Junior); Ranked: 24 (Senior); 25 Mtr Rapid Fore Pistol Shooting; Asian Shooting Confederation; 01.02.2017
Medal record
Men's Pistol Shooting
Representing India
ISCH-International Shooting Competitions of Hannover
Silver medal – second place	2018 Germany	Team
49th Grand Prix Of Liberation
	2018 Plzeň	Team
27th Meeting of the Shooting Hopes
	2017 Plzeň	Team
26th Meeting of the Shooting Hopes
	2016 Plzeň	Team
ISSF Junior World Cup
	2016 Gabala	Team
Representing Kerala
Masters Meet - National Championship
Bronze medal – third place	2017 New Delhi	Rapid Fire Pistol
60th National Shooting Championship
Bronze medal – third place	2016 Pune	Standard Pistol
Silver medal – second place	2016 Pune	Rapid Fire Pistol
Silver medal – second place	2016 Pune	Rapid Fire Pistol
Bronze medal – third place	2016 Pune	Rapid Fire Pistol
South Zone Shooting Championship
Gold medal – first place	2017 Chennai	Sport Pistol (NR)
Gold medal – first place	2017 Chennai	Standard Pistol (NR)
Gold medal – first place	2017 Chennai	Centre Fire Pistol
Bronze medal – third place	2017 Chennai	Standard Pistol
Bronze medal – third place	2017 Chennai	Centre Fire Pistol
Silver medal – second place	2017 Chennai	10 Meter Air Pistol
Bronze medal – third place	2017 Chennai	10 Meter Air Pistol
Representing Idukki
51st Kerala State Shooting Championship
Gold medal – first place	2018 Calicut	Rapid Fire Pistol
Gold medal – first place	2018 Calicut	Standard Pistol
Gold medal – first place	2018 Calicut	Standard Pistol(Team)
Gold medal – first place	2018 Calicut	Centre Fire Pistol(Team)
Silver medal – second place	201 Calicut	10 Meter Air Pistol(Team)
Bronze medal – third place	2018 Calicut	50 Meter Air Pistol(Team)
50th Kerala State Shooting Championship
Gold medal – first place	2017 Palakkad	Rapid Fire Pistol
Gold medal – first place	2017 Palakkad	Rapid Fire Pistol
Gold medal – first place	2017 Palakkad	Sport Pistol
Gold medal – first place	2017 Palakkad	Centre Fire Pistol
Gold medal – first place	2017 Palakkad	Standard Pistol (NR)
Gold medal – first place	2017 Palakkad	Standard Pistol
Silver medal – second place	2017 Palakkad	10 Meter Air Pistol
Bronze medal – third place	2017 Palakkad	50 Meter Air Pistol
Gold medal – first place	2017 Palakkad	Rapid Fire Pistol(Team)
Gold medal – first place	2017 Palakkad	10 Meter Air Pistol(Team)
Gold medal – first place	2017 Palakkad	10 Meter Air Pistol(Team)
Gold medal – first place	2017 Palakkad	Standard Pistol(Team)
Silver medal – second place	2017 Palakkad	Standard Pistol(Team)
Silver medal – second place	2017 Palakkad	Centre Fire Pistol(Team)
49th Kerala State Shooting Championship
Gold medal – first place	2016 Idukki	Rapid Fire Pistol (NR)
Gold medal – first place	2016 Idukki	Rapid Fire Pistol (NR)
Gold medal – first place	2016 Idukki	Sport Pistol (NR)
Gold medal – first place	2016 Idukki	Centre Fire Pistol
Silver medal – second place	2016 Idukki	Standard Pistol
Bronze medal – third place	2016 Idukki	Standard Pistol
Bronze medal – third place	2016 Idukki	10 Meter Air Pistol
Gold medal – first place	2016 Idukki	Centre Fire Pistol(Team)
Gold medal – first place	2016 Idukki	Standard Pistol(Team)
Gold medal – first place	2016 Idukki	Rapid Fire Pistol(Team)
- Updated on 9 January 2019

Thomas George Karimpanal (born 13 July 1997) popularly known as Thommen is an Indian sports shooter.

== Early life ==
He was born in Kottayam, Kerala to George Kurian Karimpanal and Rekha George. He graduated from OP Jindal Global University School of International Affairs.

== Career ==
He is in Jr. National Shooting Squad since 2015.
