= Jenny Vatne =

Norwegian sport shooter

Personal information
- National team: Norway
- Citizenship: Norwegian
- Born: 30 January 1997 (age 29) Oslo, Norway
- Home town: Skarnes, Norway
- Occupation: Sport Shooter
- Height: 170 cm (5 ft 7 in)

Sport
- Country: Norway
- Sport: Shooting
- Events: 50 meter rifle prone; 50 meter rifle three positions; 300 metre rifle prone; 300 metre rifle three positions; 300 m standard rifle
- Club: Nordstrand Sportskyttere
- Coached by: Oyvind Sirevaag; Leif Steinar Rolland
Medal record
Women's shooting
Representing Norway
World Championships
Gold medal – first place	2022 Cairo	300m Rifle Prone - Women's Team
Gold medal – first place	2022 Cairo	300m Rifle 3-Position - Women's Team
Gold medal – first place	2023 Baku	300m Rifle 3-Position - Women's Team
Silver medal – second place	2023 Baku	300m Rifle Prone - Women's Team
Silver medal – second place	2025 Cairo	300 m rifle prone
European Shooting Championships
Gold medal – first place	2016 Tallinn	50m Rifle Prone junior
Gold medal – first place	2025 Châteauroux	300 m Rifle 3 Positions Team
Silver medal – second place	2016 Tallinn	50m Rifle 3-Positions junior
Bronze medal – third place	2025 Châteauroux	300 m Rifle Prone

Jenny Vatne (born 30 January 1997) is a Norwegian sports shooter. As of October 2023, she has won four team medals at ISSF World Championships, as well as two medals at European Shooting Championships.

== Sporting career ==
Jenny began shooting in 2007 and started competing in 2008.

Her first major international selection was to the 2014 ISSF World Shooting Championships in Granada where she finished 5th in the Junior Women's 50m rifle prone event, and 30th in the 50m rifle 3-position event.

In 2016 she was active in the ISSF Junior World Cup where she had a best individual finish of sixth in the 50m 3-position rifle event. At the second leg in Gabala, she won two gold medals as part of the Norway team in the 50m rifle prone and 50m rifle 3-position events.

She was selected to compete at the 2016 European Championships as a junior where she won gold in the 50m rifle prone event and silver in the 50m rifle 3-position event.

As a senior, Jenny moved into 300 metre rifle shooting.

At the 2022 Lapua European Cup, Jenny placed fourth individually in the Open 300 m standard rifle match, winning team silver. The next day, she won individual silver and team gold in the women's 300 m rifle three positions match.

At the 2022 World Championships in Cairo, she won gold medals in the Women's Team events for 300m rifle prone and three-position.

In the 2023 World Championships in Baku, the Women's team won gold again in the 300m three-position event, and silver in the prone event.
