= Lee Meng-yuan =

Taiwanese sports shooter (born 1994)

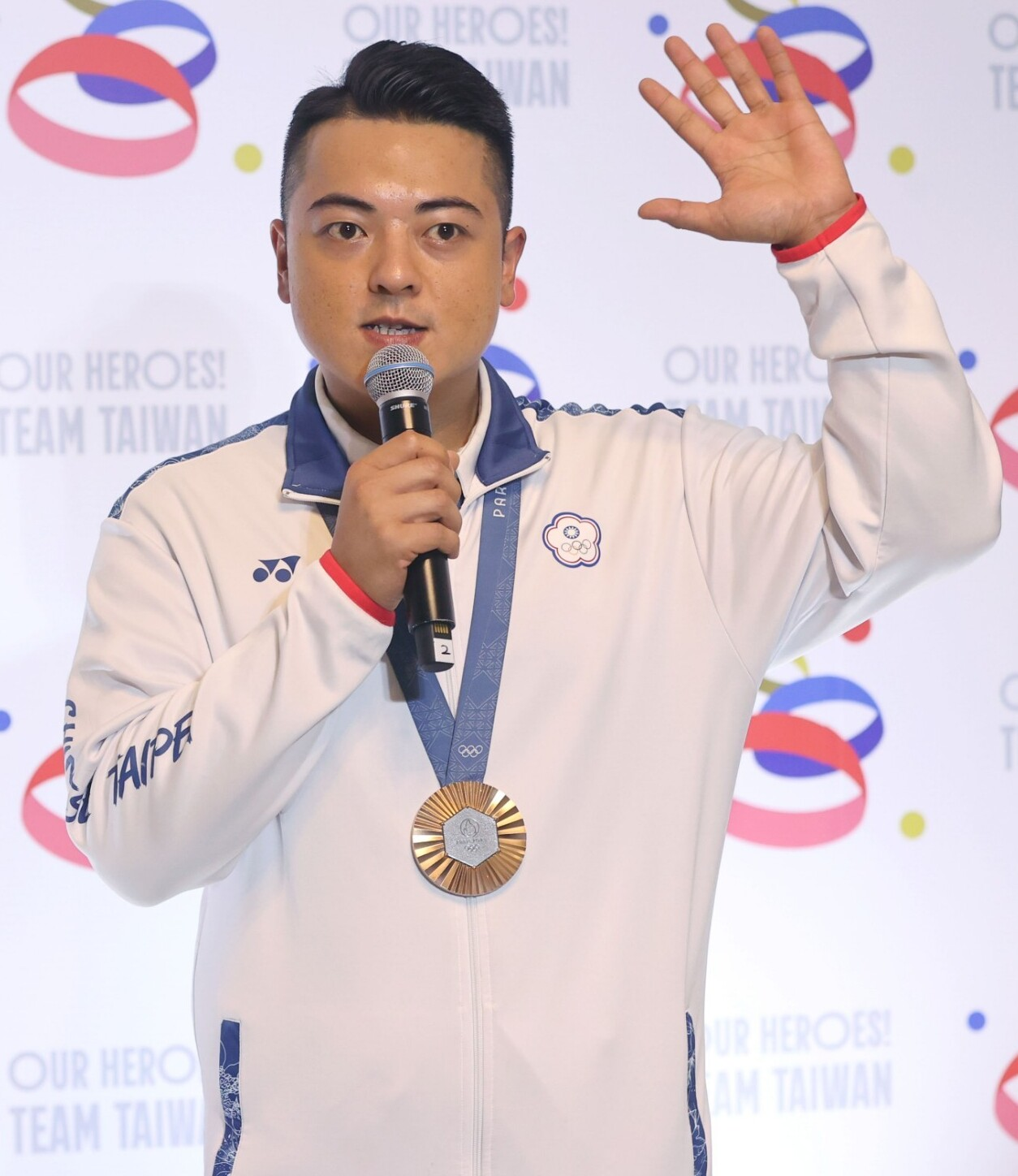
- Lee in 2024

Personal information
- Born: August 25, 1994 (age 32) Taoyuan, Taiwan

Sport
- Country: Taiwan
- Sport: Sports shooting
Medal record
Men's shooting
Representing Chinese Taipei
Olympic Games
Bronze medal – third place	2024 Paris	Skeet
Asian Games
Bronze medal – third place	2026 Aichi–Nagoya	Skeet
Asian Championships
Bronze medal – third place	2023 Changwon	Skeet
Asian Shotgun Championships
Gold medal – first place	2024 Kuwait City	Skeet

Lee Meng-yuan (Chinese: 李孟遠; pinyin: Lǐ Mèngyuǎn; born 25 August 1994 in Taoyuan, Taiwan) is a Taiwanese sports shooter and Olympian who won the bronze medal in men's skeet at the 2024 Summer Olympics in Paris. He is the first Taiwanese athlete to win an Olympic medal in shooting.

== Early life and education ==
Lee's father, Hsieh Chih-pei, was a sports shooter and took him to the shooting range when he was a kindergarten student. Lee studied at National Taiwan Sport University.

== Skeet shooting career ==
Lee made his debut in 2010 Asian Games. He was trained by coach Tsai Pai-sheng (Choi Pak Sang). After Tsai's death in 2011, Lee paused skeet competition for 2 years until his father became his coach and pushed him back into competition.

He placed 5th in 2022 Asian Games. He won the bronze medal at Asian Shooting Championships in 2023. In 2024, He won the gold medal at the Asian Shotgun Championships.

== Personal life ==
Lee takes his mother's surname. He is a Taoist. After failing to qualify for the 2020 Summer Olympics at the 2019 Asian Shooting Championships by one point, he adopted a Rottweiler and named it "Quota" to encourage himself.

Lee has stated that Vincent Hancock is his personal hero.
