= Muskurahat =

Muskurahat (lit. 'smile' in Hindi) may refer to these Indian films:

- Muskurahat (1943 film), a Bollywood film
- Muskurahat (1992 film), a Hindi-language Indian film

== See also ==
- Muskan, an Indian feminine given name
- "Muskurane" or "Muskurane Ki Vajah Tum Ho", a song by Jeet Gannguli and Mohammed Irfan from the 2014 Indian Hindi-language film CityLights
- Muskurane Ki Vajah Tum Ho, an Indian television show
- "Muskurayega India", a 2020 Hindi-language song by Vishal Mishra about the COVID-19 pandemic in India
