= 2018 ISSF Junior World Cup =

The 2018 ISSF Junior World Cup is the annual edition of the ISSF Junior World Cup, governed by the International Shooting Sport Federation

== Men's results ==
=== Rifle events ===
==== Individual Results ====
50 metre rifle three positions			50 metre rifle prone			10 metre air rifle		
Sydney Australia (19-29 Mar)			Sydney Australia (19-29 Mar)			Sydney Australia (19-29 Mar)		
1st place, gold medalist(s)	Zhang Changhong (CHN)	451.6	No Event			1st place, gold medalist(s)	Yuqi Liu (CHN)	247.1
2nd place, silver medalist(s)	Sebastian Langstrom (FIN)	448.0	No Event			2nd place, silver medalist(s)	Zalan Pekler (HUN)	246.0
3rd place, bronze medalist(s)	Zalan Pekler (HUN)	439.4	No Event			3rd place, bronze medalist(s)	Arjun Babuta (IND)	226.3
Suhl Germany (22-29 Jun)			Suhl Germany (22-29 Jun)			Suhl Germany (22-29 Jun)		
1st place, gold medalist(s)	Marco Suppini (ITA)	455.0	1st place, gold medalist(s)	William Shaner (USA)	623.4	1st place, gold medalist(s)	Hriday Hazarika (IND)	248.7
2nd place, silver medalist(s)	Artem Filippov (RUS)	452.7	2nd place, silver medalist(s)	Jon-Hermann Hegg (NOR)	620.8	2nd place, silver medalist(s)	Maximilian Ulbrich (GER)	248.4
3rd place, bronze medalist(s)	Zhang Changhong (CHN)	440.5	3rd place, bronze medalist(s)	Ila Marsov (RUS)	620.7	3rd place, bronze medalist(s)	Fu Gangfeng (CHN)	226.9

==== Team Results ====
50 metre rifle three positions			50 metre rifle prone			10 metre air rifle		
Sydney Australia (19-29 Mar)			Sydney Australia (19-29 Mar)			Sydney Australia (19-29 Mar)		
No Team Event			No Team Event			No Team Event		
Suhl Germany (22-29 Jun)			Suhl Germany (22-29 Jun)			Suhl Germany (22-29 Jun)		
1st place, gold medalist(s)	(CZE) Filip Nepejchal Jiri Pricratsky Radek Tichi	3469-156x	1st place, gold medalist(s)	(RUS) Ilia Marsov Grigorii Shamakov Artem Filippov	1856.8	1st place, gold medalist(s)	(IND) Hriday Hazarika Divyansh Singh Panwar Sahu Tushar Mane	1875.3 WRJ
2nd place, silver medalist(s)	(RUS) Ilia Marsov Grigorii Shamakov Artem Filippov	3459-144x	2nd place, silver medalist(s)	(GER) Max Frieder Braun Tom Barber Luc Fabian Dingerdissen	1856.2	2nd place, silver medalist(s)	(RUS) Ilia Marsov Grigorii Shamakov Denis Goncharenko	1873.4
3rd place, bronze medalist(s)	(HUN) Peter Vas Zalan Pekler Patrik Pagai	3451-138x	3rd place, bronze medalist(s)	(AUT) Stefan Wadlegger Andreas Thum Patrick Diem	1851.2	3rd place, bronze medalist(s)	(CHN) Zhang Changhong Fu Gangfeng Liu Yuqi	1870.8

=== Pistols Events ===
==== Individual Results ====
50 metre pistol			25 metre rapid fire pistol			10 metre air pistol			25 meter standard pistol			25 meter pistol		
Sydney Australia (19-29 Mar)			Sydney Australia (19-29 Mar)			Sydney Australia (19-29 Mar)			Sydney Australia (19-29 Mar)			Sydney Australia (19-29 Mar)		
No Event			1st place, gold medalist(s)	Anish Bhanwala (IND)	29	1st place, gold medalist(s)	Zhehao Wang (CHN)	242.5 WRJ	No Event			No Event		
No Event			2nd place, silver medalist(s)	Zhipeng Cheng (CHN)	27	2nd place, silver medalist(s)	Gaurav Rana (IND)	233.9	No Event			No Event		
No Event			3rd place, bronze medalist(s)	Jueming Zhang (CHN)	23	3rd place, bronze medalist(s)	Anmol Anmol (IND)	215.1	No Event			No Event		
Suhl Germany (22-29 Jun)			Suhl Germany (22-29 Jun)			Suhl Germany (22-29 Jun)			Suhl Germany (22-29 Jun)			Suhl Germany (22-29 Jun)		
1st place, gold medalist(s)	Mikhail Isakov (RUS)	553-06x	1st place, gold medalist(s)	Matej Rampula (CZE)	30	1st place, gold medalist(s)	Saurabh Chaudhary (IND)	243.7 WRJ	1st place, gold medalist(s)	Vijayveer Sindhu (IND)	576-15x	1st place, gold medalist(s)	Ernests Erbs (LAT)	586-24x
2nd place, silver medalist(s)	Zhehao Wang (CHN)	550-06x	2nd place, silver medalist(s)	Jueming Zhang (CHN)	28	2nd place, silver medalist(s)	Lim Hojin (KOR)	239.6	2nd place, silver medalist(s)	Ernests Erbs (LAT)	566-14x	2nd place, silver medalist(s)	Abdul-Aziz Kurdzi (BLR)	585-23x
3rd place, bronze medalist(s)	Anmol Anmol (IND)	549-07x	3rd place, bronze medalist(s)	Anish Bhanwala (IND)	24	3rd place, bronze medalist(s)	Zhehao Wang (CHN)	218.7	3rd place, bronze medalist(s)	Rajkanwar Singh Sandhu (IND)	566-13x	3rd place, bronze medalist(s)	Udhayveer Sindhu (IND)	585-15x

==== Team Results ====
50 metre pistol			25 metre rapid fire pistol			10 metre air pistol			25 meter standard pistol			25 meter pistol		
Sydney Australia (19-29 Mar)			Sydney Australia (19-29 Mar)			Sydney Australia (19-29 Mar)			Sydney Australia (19-29 Mar)			Sydney Australia (19-29 Mar)		
No Event			1st place, gold medalist(s)	(CHN) Jueming Zhang Zhipeng Cheng Pan Junchen	1733-62x WRJ	1st place, gold medalist(s)	(IND) Arjun Singh Cheema Gaurav Rana Anmol Anmol	1718 - 49x	No Event			No Event		
No Event			2nd place, silver medalist(s)	(IND) Anish Anish Anhad Jawanda Adarsh Singh	1714 - 42x	2nd place, silver medalist(s)	(CHN) Jinyao Liu Zhehao Wang Sihao Tang	1716 - 39x	No Event			No Event		
No Event			3rd place, bronze medalist(s)	(IND) Rajkanwar Singh Sandhu Japtyesh Singh Jaspal Mandeep Singh	1669 - 37x	3rd place, bronze medalist(s)	(IND) Anhad Jawanda Abhishek Arya Adarsh Singh	1675 - 37x	No Event			No Event		
Suhl Germany (22-29 Jun)			Suhl Germany (22-29 Jun)			Suhl Germany (22-29 Jun)			Suhl Germany (22-29 Jun)			Suhl Germany (22-29 Jun)		
1st place, gold medalist(s)	(IND) Arjun Singh Cheema Gaurav Rana Anmol Anmol	1643-26x	1st place, gold medalist(s)	(CHN) Jueming Zhang Zhipeng Cheng Pan Junchen	1732-49x	1st place, gold medalist(s)	(IND) Saurabh Chaudhary Abhishek Arya Anmol Anmol	1730 - 60x EWRJ	1st place, gold medalist(s)	(IND) Udhayveer Sindhu Vijayveer Sindhu Anish Bhanwala	1706-39x WRJ	1st place, gold medalist(s)	(IND) Udhayveer Sindhu Vijayveer Sindhu Rajkanwar Singh Sandhu	1747 - 47x WRJ
2nd place, silver medalist(s)	(RUS) Mikhail Isakov Verena Zaisberger Alexander Petrov	1638-21x	2nd place, silver medalist(s)	(UKR) Maksym Horodynests Yuriy Kolesnyk Denys Vorona	1712-38x	2nd place, silver medalist(s)	(CHN) Wang Zhehao Hu Pengqi Shao Zexue	1720 - 69x	2nd place, silver medalist(s)	(CHN) Jueming Zhang Zhipeng Cheng Pan Junchen	1680-30x	2nd place, silver medalist(s)	(FRA) Edouard Dortomb Clément Greffier Tristan Picat Re	1729-49x
3rd place, bronze medalist(s)	(ITA) Andrea Morassut Simone Saravalli Federico Nilo Maldini	1594-14x	3rd place, bronze medalist(s)	(GER) Florian Peter Christoph Lutz Stefan Max Holl	1710-38x	3rd place, bronze medalist(s)	(IND) Arjun Singh Cheema Gaurav Rana Udhayveer Sindhu	1719-47x	3rd place, bronze medalist(s)	(UKR) Maksym Horodynests Yuriy Kolesnyk Denys Vorona	1671-33x	3rd place, bronze medalist(s)	(UKR) Maksym Horodynets Yuriy Kolesnyk Denys Vorona	1726-51x

=== Shotgun Events ===
==== Individual Results ====
Trap			Skeet		
Sydney Australia (19-29 Mar)			Sydney Australia (19-29 Mar)		
1st place, gold medalist(s)	Matteo Marongiu (ITA)	39 SO:2	1st place, gold medalist(s)	Xuyang Dou (CHN)	58 WRJ
2nd place, silver medalist(s)	Yiliu Ouyang (CHN)	39 SO:1	2nd place, silver medalist(s)	Matteo Chiti (ITA)	52
3rd place, bronze medalist(s)	Vivaan Kapoor (IND)	30	3rd place, bronze medalist(s)	Niccolo Sodi (ITA)	42
Suhl Germany (22-29 Jun)			Suhl Germany (22-29 Jun)		
1st place, gold medalist(s)	Adria Torres Martinez (ESP)	44	1st place, gold medalist(s)	Emil Kjelgaard Petersen (DEN)	56
2nd place, silver medalist(s)	Yang Kun-Pi (TPE)	43	2nd place, silver medalist(s)	Jaroslav Lang (CZE)	55
3rd place, bronze medalist(s)	Teo Petroni (ITA)	31	3rd place, bronze medalist(s)	Elia Sdruccioli (ITA)	44

==== Team Results ====
Trap			Skeet		
Sydney Australia (19-29 Mar)			Sydney Australia (19-29 Mar)		
1st place, gold medalist(s)	(CHN) Cheng Li Yiliu Ouyang Haicheng Yu	343	1st place, gold medalist(s)	(ITA) Elia Sdruccioli Matteo Chiti Niccolo Sodi	357
2nd place, silver medalist(s)	(AUS) Nathan Steven Argiro Mitchell Iles- Crevatin Adam Joshua Bylsma	340	2nd place, silver medalist(s)	(IND) Anant Jeet Singh Naruka Ayush Rudraraju Gurnihal Singh Garcha	348
3rd place, bronze medalist(s)	(IND) Vivaan Kapoor Lakshay Sheoran Ali Aman Elahi	338	3rd place, bronze medalist(s)	(CHN) Xuyang Dou Lingfeng Yu Hongzhao Luo	337
Suhl Germany (22-29 Jun)			Suhl Germany (22-29 Jun)		
1st place, gold medalist(s)	(ITA) Teo Petroni Nino Cuomo Matteo Marongiu	345	1st place, gold medalist(s)	(CZE) Jaroslav Lang Daniel Korcak Radek Prokop	335
2nd place, silver medalist(s)	(ITA) Daniele Flammini Lorenzo Ferrari Emanuele Iezzi	340	2nd place, silver medalist(s)	(ITA) Elia Sdruccioli Matteo Chiti Filippo Boncompagni	334
3rd place, bronze medalist(s)	(CZE) Fabio Beccari Bedřich Chaloupka Jan Palacký	326	3rd place, bronze medalist(s)	(ITA) Alessandro Calonaci Niccolo Sodi Cristian Ghilli	331

== Women's Results ==
=== Rifle events ===
==== Individual Results ====
50 metre rifle three positions			50 m rifle prone			10 metre air rifle		
Sydney Australia (19-29 Mar)			Sydney Australia (19-29 Mar)			Sydney Australia (19-29 Mar)		
No Results			No Event			1st place, gold medalist(s)	Elavenil Valarivan (IND)	249.8
No Results			No Event			2nd place, silver medalist(s)	Ying-Shin Lin (TPE)	248.7
No Results			No Event			3rd place, bronze medalist(s)	Zeru Wang (CHN)	228.4
Suhl Germany (22-29 Jun)			Suhl Germany (22-29 Jun)			Suhl Germany (22-29 Jun)		
1st place, gold medalist(s)	Zeru Wang (CHN)	456.3	1st place, gold medalist(s)	Morgan Phillips (USA)	626.8 WRJ	1st place, gold medalist(s)	Elavenil Valarivan (IND)	251.7
2nd place, silver medalist(s)	Morgan Phillips (USA)	455.5	2nd place, silver medalist(s)	Sheileen Waibel (AUT)	623.5	2nd place, silver medalist(s)	Zeru Wang (CHN)	250.9
3rd place, bronze medalist(s)	Muriel Zueger (SUI)	443.3	3rd place, bronze medalist(s)	Sofia Benetti (ITA)	621.4	3rd place, bronze medalist(s)	Ying-Shin Lin (TPE)	229.5

==== Team Results ====
50 metre rifle three positions			50 m rifle prone			10 metre air rifle		
Sydney Australia (19-29 Mar)			Sydney Australia (19-29 Mar)			Sydney Australia (19-29 Mar)		
No Team Event			No Team Event			1st place, gold medalist(s)	(IND) Elavenil Valarivan Zeena Khitta Shreya Agarawal	1876.5; WRJ
No Team Event			No Team Event			2nd place, silver medalist(s)	(TPE) Ying-Shin Lin Yi-Ting Tsai Chien-Ching Hung	1869.2
No Team Event			No Team Event			3rd place, bronze medalist(s)	(CHN) Yingjie Zhu Zeru Wang Mingwei Gao	1868.3
Suhl Germany (22-29 Jun)				Suhl Germany (22-29 Jun)			Suhl Germany (22-29 Jun)	
1st place, gold medalist(s)	(CHN) Yu Zang Zeru Wang Fu Yutian	3497 - 167x WRJ	1st place, gold medalist(s)	(CZE) Katerina Kolarikova, Sara Karasova, Sabina Thurnwaldova	1855.2	1st place, gold medalist(s)	(CHN) Yu Zang Zeru Wang Mingwei Gao	1879.9 WRJ
2nd place, silver medalist(s)	(USA) Morgan Phillips Elizabeth Marsh Kristen Shae Hemphill	3484 - 149x	2nd place, silver medalist(s)	(AUT) Sheileen Waibel Rebecca Koeck Verena Zaisberger	1854.6	2nd place, silver medalist(s)	(SGP) Tan Qian Xiu Adele Martina Lindsay Veloso Ho Xiu Yi	1879.9 WRJ
3rd place, bronze medalist(s)	(GER) Sophie Petry Johanna Theresa Tripp Hannah Steffen	3479 - 152x	3rd place, bronze medalist(s)	(GER) Leah Faust Johanna Theresa Tripp Hannah Steffen	1854.2	3rd place, bronze medalist(s)	(IND) Elavenil Valarivan Zeena Khitta Shreya Agarawal	1871.0

=== Pistols Events ===
==== Individual Results ====
50 metre pistol			25 metre pistol			25 meter standard pistol			10 metre air pistol		
Sydney Australia (19-29 Mar)			Sydney Australia (19-29 Mar)			Sydney Australia (19-29 Mar)			Sydney Australia (19-29 Mar)		
No Event			1st place, gold medalist(s)	Muskan Muskan (IND)	35	No Event			1st place, gold medalist(s)	Manu Bhaker (IND)	200.6
No Event			2nd place, silver medalist(s)	Sihang Qin (CHN)	34	No Event			2nd place, silver medalist(s)	Kanyakorn Hirunphoem (THA)	197.7
No Event			3rd place, bronze medalist(s)	Kanyakorn Hirunphoem (THA)	26	No Event			3rd place, bronze medalist(s)	Kaiman Lu (CHN)	176.2
Suhl Germany (22-29 Jun)			Suhl Germany (22-29 Jun)			Suhl Germany (22-29 Jun)			Suhl Germany (22-29 Jun)		
1st place, gold medalist(s)	Yulyana Rohach (BLR)	530-08x	1st place, gold medalist(s)	Camille Jedrzejewski (FRA)	35	1st place, gold medalist(s)	Vishwa Jignesh Dahiya (IND)	553-09x	1st place, gold medalist(s)	Manu Bhaker (IND)	242.5 WRJ
2nd place, silver medalist(s)	Neha Neha (IND)	528-04x	2nd place, silver medalist(s)	Qiu Danhong (CHN)	34	2nd place, silver medalist(s)	Viktoria Egri (HUN)	551-09x	2nd place, silver medalist(s)	Kaiman Lu (CHN)	236.9
3rd place, bronze medalist(s)	Devanshi Dhama (IND)	527-06x	3rd place, bronze medalist(s)	Miroslava Mincheva (BUL)	25	3rd place, bronze medalist(s)	Yana Chuchmarova (UKR)	549-13x	3rd place, bronze medalist(s)	Li Xue (CHN)	216.2

==== Team Results ====
50 metre pistol			25 metre pistol			25 meter standard pistol			10 metre air pistol		
Sydney Australia (19-29 Mar)			Sydney Australia (19-29 Mar)			Sydney Australia (19-29 Mar)			Sydney Australia (19-29 Mar)		
No Team Event			1st place, gold medalist(s)	(IND) Manu Bhaker Muskan Devanshi Rana	1715 - 47x	No Event			1st place, gold medalist(s)	(IND) 1 Manu Bhaker Devanshi Rana Mahima Turhi Agrawal	1693 - 37x WRJ
No Team Event			2nd place, silver medalist(s)	(IND) 2 Arunima Gaur Mahima Turhi Agrawal Tanu Rawal	1705 - 45x	No Event			2nd place, silver medalist(s)	(CHN) Jiaruixuan Xiao Kaiman Lu Xue Li	1681 - 45x
No Team Event			3rd place, bronze medalist(s)	(THA) 1 Kanyakorn Hirunphoem Viramon Kidarn Luxciga Srinitivoravong	1700 - 40x	No Event			3rd place, bronze medalist(s)	(THA) 1 Kanyakorn Hirunphoem Luxciga Srinitivoravong Warunyapha Kaewngoen	1673 - 45x
Suhl Germany (22-29 Jun)			Suhl Germany (22-29 Jun)			Suhl Germany (22-29 Jun)			Suhl Germany (22-29 Jun)		
1st place, gold medalist(s)	(IND)Neha Neha Devanshi Dhama Anushka Patil	1565-14x	1st place, gold medalist(s)	(CHN)1 Jiang Ranxin Qiu Danhong Xu Jie	1713-37x	1st place, gold medalist(s)	(IND)Vishwa Jignesh Dahiya Anshika Satendra Tanu Rawal	1634-22x	1st place, gold medalist(s)	(CHN) Jiaruixuan Xiao Kaiman Lu Xue Li	1710-40x WRJ
2nd place, silver medalist(s)	(RUS)Nadezhda Koloda Tatiana Shkred Valentina Borisevich	1539-12x	2nd place, silver medalist(s)	(CHN) Xiao Jiaruixuan Feng Sixuan Xue Li	1708-49x	2nd place, silver medalist(s)	(USA) Katelyn Morgan Abeln Sarah Eungee Choe Kellie Foster	1622-28x	2nd place, silver medalist(s)	(ITA) Margherita Brigida Vaccaro Giulia Campostrini Brunella Aria	1701-34x
3rd place, bronze medalist(s)	(UKR) Mariia-Solomiia Vozniak Nadiia Shamanova Anastasiia Semchyshyna	1527-11x	3rd place, bronze medalist(s)	(KOR) OH Hyunjeong KIM Woori Park Seyeong	1706-46x	3rd place, bronze medalist(s)	(HUN) Viktoria Egri Sara Rahel Fabian Krisztina Panna Kamaromi	1578-24x	3rd place, bronze medalist(s)	(IND) 1 Manu Bhaker Devanshi Rana Mahima Turhi Agrawal	1694-42x

=== Shotgun Events ===
==== Individual Results ====
Trap			Skeet		
Sydney Australia (19-29 Mar)			Sydney Australia (19-29 Mar)		
1st place, gold medalist(s)	Yuwei Duan (CHN)	36 SO:2	1st place, gold medalist(s)	Aislin Jones (AUS)	51
2nd place, silver medalist(s)	Augusta Rose Campos-Martyn (GBR)	36SO:1	2nd place, silver medalist(s)	Yufei Che (CHN)	47
3rd place, bronze medalist(s)	Wendi Gao (CHN)	30	3rd place, bronze medalist(s)	Ganemat Sekhon (IND)	36
Suhl Germany (22-29 Jun)				Suhl Germany (22-29 Jun)	
1st place, gold medalist(s)	Gaia Ragazzini (ITA)	39	1st place, gold medalist(s)	Vanesa Hockova (SVK)	52 WRJ
2nd place, silver medalist(s)	Sofia Littame (ITA)	35	2nd place, silver medalist(s)	Anna Zadnova (RUS)	50
3rd place, bronze medalist(s)	Giulia Grassia (ITA)	27	3rd place, bronze medalist(s)	Yufei Che (CHN)	36

==== Team Results ====
Trap			Skeet		
Sydney Australia (19-29 Mar)			Sydney Australia (19-29 Mar)		
1st place, gold medalist(s)	(CHN) Zhang Ting; Yuwei Duan; Wendi Gao	307; WRJ	No Team Event		
2nd place, silver medalist(s)	(AUS) Charlie Anna Hudson-Czerniecki; Alexis Elsa Preston; Antonia Katharina Loizos	293	No Team Event		
3rd place, bronze medalist(s)	(ITA) Erica Sessa; Diana Ghilarducci; Maria Lucia Palmitessa	284	No Team Event		
Suhl Germany (22-29 Jun)				Suhl Germany (22-29 Jun)	
1st place, gold medalist(s)	(GBR) Rebecca Aimee Fergusson; Augusta Rose Campos-Martyn; Lucy Charlotte Hall	322 WRJ	1st place, gold medalist(s)	(RUS) Anna Zhadnova; Zilia Batyrshina; Elena Bukhonova	308 WRJ
2nd place, silver medalist(s)	(ITA) 1 Giulia Grassia; Carolina Praganin; Erica Sessa	310	2nd place, silver medalist(s)	(CHN) Che Yufei; Lu Yikai; Sun Yashu	302
3rd place, bronze medalist(s)	(ITA) 2 Gaia Ragazzini; Sofia Littame; Valentina Panza	307	3rd place, bronze medalist(s)	(IND) Ganemat Shekhon; Areeba Khan; Parinaaz Dhaliwal	294

== Mixed Team Results ==
	10 metre air pistol		10 metre air rifle		Trap	
Sydney Australia (19-29 Mar)	1st place, gold medalist(s)	Anmol Anmol / Manu Bhaker (IND)	1st place, gold medalist(s)	Yingjie Zhu / Yuqi Liu (CHN) 2	1st place, gold medalist(s)	Teo Petroni / Erica Sessa (ITA) 2
Sydney Australia (19-29 Mar)	2nd place, silver medalist(s)	Jinyao Liu / Xue Li (CHN) 1	2nd place, silver medalist(s)	Changhong Zhang / Mingwei Gao (CHN) 1	2nd place, silver medalist(s)	Ali Aman Elahi / Manisha Kheer (IND) 2
Sydney Australia (19-29 Mar)	3rd place, bronze medalist(s)	Zhehao Wang / Jiaruixuan Xiao (CHN) 2	3rd place, bronze medalist(s)	Shreya Agrawal /Arjun Babuta (IND) 1	3rd place, bronze medalist(s)	Cheng Li / Wendi Gao (CHN) 1
Suhl Germany (22-29 Jun)	1st place, gold medalist(s)	Saurabh Chaudhary / Devanshi Rana (IND) 2	1st place, gold medalist(s)	Elavenil Valarivan / Divyansh Singh Panwar (IND) 1	1st place, gold medalist(s)	Teo Petroni / Erica Sessa (ITA) 2
Suhl Germany (22-29 Jun)	2nd place, silver medalist(s)	Anmol Anmol / Manu Bhaker (IND) 1	2nd place, silver medalist(s)	Anna Janssen / Maximillan Ulbrich (GER) 1	2nd place, silver medalist(s)	Nathan Steven Argiro / Alexis Elsa Preston (AUS)
Suhl Germany (22-29 Jun)	3rd place, bronze medalist(s)	Hojin Lim / Woori Kim (KOR) 2	3rd place, bronze medalist(s)	Sofia Benetti / Marco Suppini (ITA) 1	3rd place, bronze medalist(s)	Ivan Georgiev/ALI / Selin Ali (BUL)

== Medal table ==
Rank	Country	Gold	Silver	Bronze	Total
1	India	24	7	17	48
2	China	15	17	14	46
3	Italy	7	6	10	23
4	Czech Republic	4	1	1	6
5	Russia	3	6	1	10
6	United States	2	3	0	5
7	Australia	1	3	0	4
8	Belarus	1	1	0	2
8	France	1	1	0	2
8	Latvia	1	1	0	2
8	United Kingdom	1	1	0	2
12	Denmark	1	0	0	1
12	Spain	1	0	0	1
12	Slovakia	1	0	0	1
15	Germany	0	3	3	6
16	Chinese Taipei	0	3	1	3
17	Hungary	0	2	3	5
18	Austria	0	2	1	4
19	Ukraine	0	1	4	5
20	Thailand	0	1	3	4
21	South Korea	0	1	2	3
22	Finland	0	1	0	1
22	Norway	0	1	0	1
22	Singapore	0	1	0	1
25	Bulgaria	0	0	2	2
26	Switzerland	0	0	1	1
Total	26	63	63	63	189

- After Junior World Cup, Suhl
