= Adarsh Singh =

Indian sport shooter

Personal information
- Nationality: Indian
- Born: 27 November 2001 (age 24) Muzzafarpur, Bihar, India

Sport
- Sport: Shooting
- Event(s): 25 m rapid fire pistol 25 m standard pistol
Medal record
Men's shooting
Representing India
Event	1st	2nd	3rd
World Cup	0	1	0
Asian Games	0	0	1
Asian Championships	0	1	2
South Asian Games	1	0	0
World University Games	0	1	0
Junior World Championships	3	1	1
Junior World Cup	2	2	1
Total	6	6	5
World Cup
Silver medal – second place	2021 New Delhi	25 m rapid fire pistol team
Asian Games
Bronze medal – third place	2022 Hangzhou	25 m rapid fire pistol team
Asian Championships
Silver medal – second place	2025 Shymkent	25 m rapid fire pistol team
Bronze medal – third place	2019 Doha	25 m rapid fire pistol team
Bronze medal – third place	2023 Changwon	25 m rapid fire pistol team
South Asian Games
Gold medal – first place	2019 Kathmandu and Pokhara	25 m rapid fire pistol team
World University Games
Silver medal – second place	2021 Chengdu	25 m rapid fire pistol team
Junior World Championships
Gold medal – first place	2018 Changwon	25 m standard pistol team
Gold medal – first place	2021 Lima	25 m rapid fire pistol team
Gold medal – first place	2022 Cairo	25 m rapid fire pistol mixed team
Silver medal – second place	2021 Lima	25 m rapid fire pistol
Bronze medal – third place	2022 Cairo	25 m rapid fire pistol team
Junior World Cup
Gold medal – first place	2019 Suhl	25 m pistol team
Gold medal – first place	2019 Suhl	25 m standard pistol team
Silver medal – second place	2019 Suhl	25 m standard pistol
Silver medal – second place	2018 Sydney	25 m rapid fire pistol team
Bronze medal – third place	2018 Sydney	10 m air pistol team

Adarsh Singh (born 27 November 2001) is an Indian pistol shooter.
