= St. Theresa's Convent Sr. Sec. School =

Location
- STCS, Sector-9; Kunjpura Road; Karnal, Haryana 132001; Karnal, Haryana; India; 29.7091102°N 77.0092708°E

Information
- Type: Convent run Private School
- Motto: In God we Trust
- Established: 1961
- Principal: Sr Priya Therese
- Staff: 35+
- Faculty: 100
- Grades: Kindergarten - 12
- Enrollment: 3500+
- Campus: 31,577.92 m^{2} (339,901.9 sq ft)
- Colors: Blue and White
- Athletics conference: Sarvodaya
- Nickname: Theresians
- Publication: The Theresean Times
- Affiliation: Central Board of Secondary Education
- Website: Official website

St. Theresa's Convent Sr. Sec. School (informally termed, STCS) is a Catholic private school, teaching students in Kindergarten through twelfth grade from Karnal in Haryana, India. STCS is one of the couple of high schools in Karnal with excellent standards of education provided by a Christian convent-run organization, The Sisters of the Little Flower of Bethany based in Mangalore. The school was started in 1961 and has been constantly renovated.

As of the 2007-08 school year, the school had an enrollment of over 3500 students and employs 100 classroom teachers.

== History ==
St. Theresa's Convent School, Karnal was established in 1961 and is administrated by Bethany Educational Society, Mangalore, a Christian Religious Minority Institution. The Bethany Educational Society is registered under the societies' education Act XXI of 1860 No.17 of 1948-49/Its head is at Bethany Convent, Manglore. All the members of Bethany Educational Society are catholic nuns belonging to the Congregation of the Sisters of the Little Flower of Bethany. The Society runs formal and non formal educational institutes all over the country.

=== Founding of STCS ===
The school is affiliated to the Central Board of Secondary Education. New Delhi. (Affiliation No. 530006/86)

=== St. Therese ===
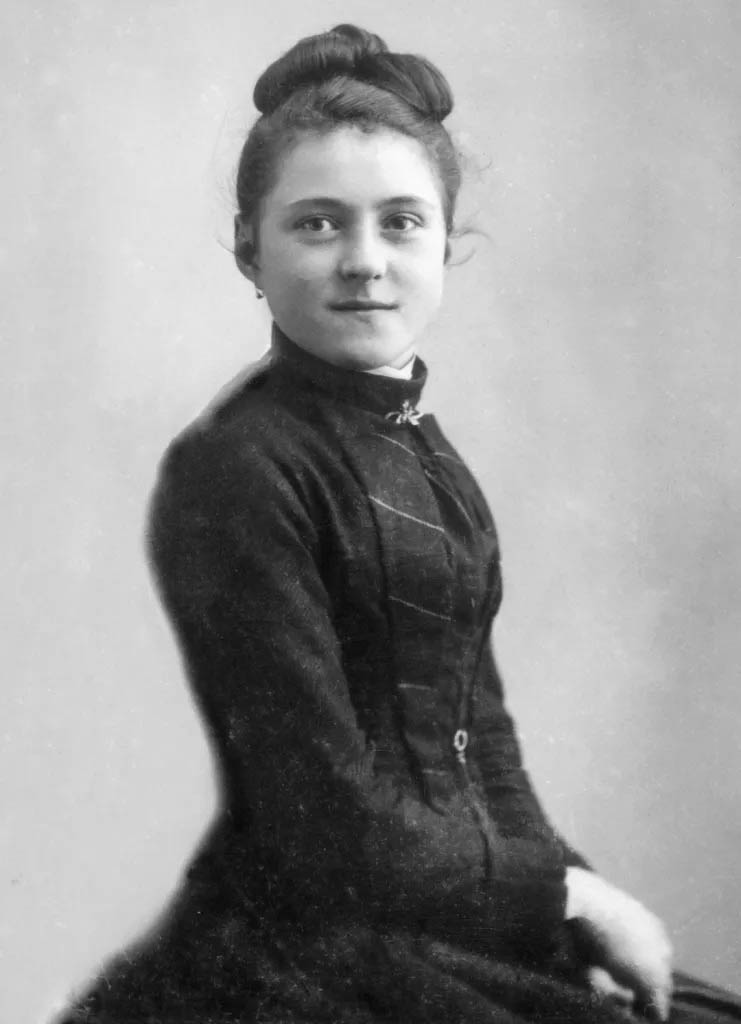
Saint Thérèse at age 15, before entering the Carmelite order

St. Therese, also known as 'St. Therese of the child Jesus' was born on 2 January 1873 at Alençon, in Normandy, a small town in northern France. At the age of 15, she entered the convent to be a religious sister.

She died on 30 September 1897 having spent the last nine and half years of her life in a cloister convent at Lisieux in France.

== The Management Council ==
As of 2013 Sr. Jyoti BS - President
Sr. M. Wilbertaa BS - Vice President
Sr. M. Joy BS - Secretary
Sr. Jeevan BS - Dy. Secretary
Sr. Marie Lyta BS - Treasurer
Sr. M. Assumta BS - Member
Sr. M. Anseline BS - Member
Sr. M. Christella BS - Member
Sr. M. Prima BS - Member
Sr. M. Lillis BS - Member

== Student life ==
A number of events are held in the school from time to time. These include regular stage-assemblies and annual functions. Besides, a number of competitions are held in the school from time to time.

=== The Student Council ===
The student cabinet is responsible for certain activities like helping teachers and other staff, before assembly monitoring of the classes and so on. Earlier the cabinet was actually a representation of the students with voting happening for the selection, however now it pretty much depends on the teachers and the principal as to who gets selected .

=== Student organizations ===
The students grade 3 and above are divided into houses:
1. Shanti
2. Shradha
3. Shakti
4. Satya
Every student is assigned a house on reaching the 3rd grade.

=== Alumni ===
The students from this school after pursuing higher education have found employment in various Organisation and Institutions. Some are employed in Govt. Departments, Public and Pvt. Enterprises such as; Railways, MES, IITs, CPWD, PWD (B & R), PWD Irrigation, PWD (Public Health), Pollution Control Board, Housing Boards, HUDA, HSEB, MITC, Panchayat Raj, and some have started their own enterprises.

- Shaurya Sirohi: R&D Engineer at Broadcom.
- Anish Bhanwala: gold medalist in Shooting sports 2018 Commonwealth Games.

== See also ==
- Education in India
- Literacy in India
- List of institutions of higher education in Haryana
