= Yashaswini Singh Deswal =

Indian sport shooter

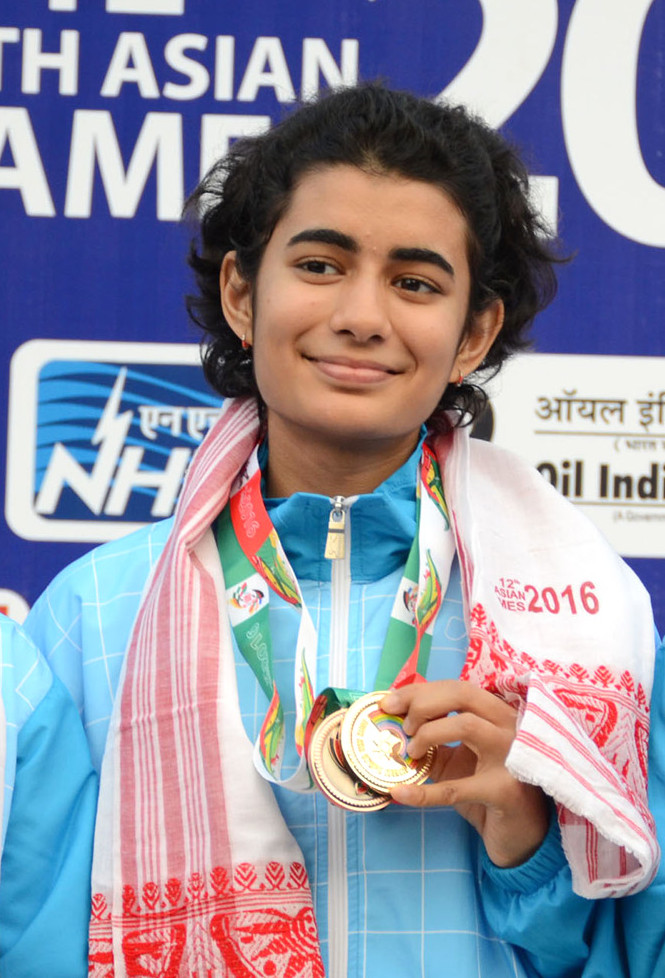
- Deswal at the 2016 South Asian Games

Personal information
- Nationality: Indian
- Born: 30 March 1997 (age 29) New Delhi, India

Sport
- Country: India
- Sport: Shooting
- Event: 10 metre air pistol
- Coached by: Tejinder Singh Dhillon
Medal record
Women's shooting
Representing India
ISSF World Cup
Gold medal – first place	2019 Rio de Janeiro	10 m air pistol
Gold medal – first place	2021 Delhi	10 m air pistol
Gold medal – first place	2021 Delhi	Women's 10 m pistol team
Silver medal – second place	2019 Rio de Janeiro	10 m air pistol mixed team
Bronze medal – third place	2021 Delhi	10 m air pistol mixed team
Bronze medal – third place	2021 Osijek	Women's 10 m pistol team
Asian Shooting Championships
Bronze medal – third place	2019 Doha	10 m air pistol team
Silver medal – second place	2019 Doha	10 m air pistol mixed team
ISSF Junior World Championships
Gold medal – first place	2017 Suhl	10 m air pistol
Asian Junior Shooting Championships
Silver medal – second place	2014 Kuwait City	10 m air pistol
ISSF Junior World Cup
Gold medal – first place	2016 Qabala	Women's 10 m pistol team
Silver medal – second place	2016 Suhl	10 m air pistol
Silver medal – second place	2016 Suhl	Women's 10 m pistol team
World University Games
Gold medal – first place	2021 Chengdu	10 m air pistol team
- Updated on 6 July 2021

Yashaswini Singh Deswal is an Indian sport shooter. As of 2021, she is ranked world No. 1 in 10 meter air pistol.

== Early and personal life ==
Deswal was born on 30 March 1997 in New Delhi. Her father Surjeet Singh Deswal is an IPS officer who works as the Director General of Indo-Tibetan Border Police and mother Saroj Deswal is the Chief Commissioner of Income Tax in Panchkula. As of August 2019, Deswal studies at DAV College in Chandigarh.

== Career ==
Deswal started practicing shooting in 2012. She qualified for the 2014 Summer Youth Olympics in Nanjing, China, where she finished sixth in the final of the 10 metre air pistol event. At the 2016 ISSF Junior World Cup, she won silver medals in both the individual event and the team event in Suhl, Germany, and gold in the team event at Qabala, Azerbaijan. At the 2016 South Asian Games, she bagged the gold medal in the team event and bronze medal in the individual event. At the 2017 ISSF Junior World Championship, she equaled the world junior record of 235.9 and won the gold medal.

In 2019, Deswal won the gold medal at the 2019 ISSF World Cup in Rio de Janeiro to book a quota spot for the 2020 Summer Olympics. She defeated Olena Kostevych, a former Olympic and world champion, in the final round.

At the 2021 ISSF World Cup in Delhi, Deswal won gold in the women's 10m air pistol event with a tally of 238.8, after topping the qualifications with 579.
