= Chinki Yadav =

Indian sport shooter

Personal information
- Nationality: Indian
- Born: 26 November 1997 (age 28) Bhopal, Madhya Pradesh, India

Sport
- Sport: Shooting
- Event: 25 metre pistol
- Coached by: Jaspal Rana
Medal record
25 metre pistol shooting
Representing India
ISSF World Cup
Gold medal – first place	2021 New Delhi	Individual
Gold medal – first place	2021 New Delhi	Team
ISSF Junior World Championships
Bronze medal – third place	2017 Suhl	Team
ISSF Junior World Cup
Gold medal – first place	2016 Gabala	Team
Bronze medal – third place	2016 Suhl	Team
Asian Shooting Championships
Gold medal – first place	2015 Kuwait City	Junior Team
Bronze medal – third place	2015 Kuwait City	Junior Individual
- Updated on 26 March 2021

Chinki Yadav is an Indian sport shooter who competes in the 25 metre pistol event. She secured a quota place for India at the 2020 Summer Olympics by qualifying for the final of the 2019 Asian Shooting Championships.

== Early and personal life ==
Yadav was born on 26 November 1997 in Bhopal, Madhya Pradesh. Her family lived in a single-room dormitory in the premises of the Tatya Tope Nagar Sports Complex where her father Mehtab Singh Yadav worked as an electrician. Yadav would accompany her father to the shooting range at the complex and, in 2012, decided to make a career in the sport. While she took up pistol shooting and trained at the Madhya Pradesh Shooting Academy, her younger brother Rajesh chose shotgun but "did not pursue it as seriously as Chinki".

As of 2019, Yadav works as an assistant bank manager.

== Career ==
Yadav won the bronze medal in the junior women's 25 metre pistol event at 2015 Asian Shooting Championships in Kuwait City with a score of 570. At the 2016 ISSF Junior World Cup, Yadav won bronze in the 25 metre pistol team event in Gabala and bronze in the same event at Suhl. She won bronze at the 2017 ISSF Junior World Championships in Suhl in the team event, along with Muskan and Gauri Sheoran.

Yadav finished second in the qualification round of 2019 Asian Shooting Championships with a score of 588 and qualified for the final. This performance secured her a quota place for the 2020 Summer Olympics as four of the eight finalists were from countries which had already earned maximum quota places for the event. She came sixth in the final with a score of 116.

== Awards ==
- 2017: Eklavya Award by Government of Madhya Pradesh on National Sports Day
- 2019: Vikram Award by Government of Madhya Pradesh on National Sports Day
