= Anish Bhanwala =

Indian sport shooter (born 2002)

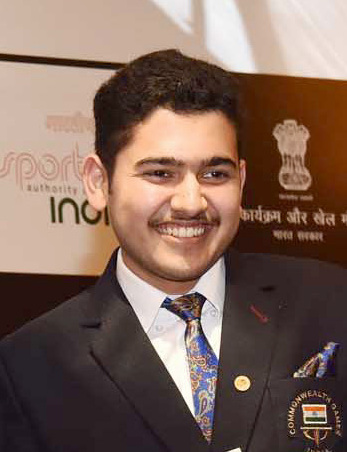
- Bhanwala in 2018

Personal information
- Born: 26 September 2002 (age 24) Sonipat, Haryana, India
- Height: 1.74 m (5 ft 9 in)

Sport
- Sport: Shooting
- Events: 25 m rapid fire pistol 25 m standard pistol 25 m pistol

Achievements and titles
- Personal best: 590 NR (2022)
Medal record
Men's shooting
Representing India
Event	1st	2nd	3rd
World Championships	0	2	0
World Cup Final	0	1	1
Commonwealth Games	1	0	0
Commonwealth Championships	0	1	0
Asian Games	0	0	1
Asian Championships	0	2	3
South Asian Games	2	0	0
World Cup	1	2	2
Junior World Championships	3	2	2
Junior World Cup	6	3	2
Total	13	13	11
Men's 25 m rapid fire pistol
World Championships
Silver medal – second place	2022 Cairo	Mixed team
Silver medal – second place	2025 Cairo	Individual
World Cup Final
Silver medal – second place	2025 Doha	Individual
Bronze medal – third place	2023 Doha	Individual
Commonwealth Games
Gold medal – first place	2018 Gold Coast	Individual
Commonwealth Championships
Silver medal – second place	2017 Brisbane	Individual
Asian Games
Bronze medal – third place	2022 Hangzhou	Team
Asian Championships
Silver medal – second place	2025 Shymkent	Individual
Silver medal – second place	2025 Shymkent	Team
Bronze medal – third place	2019 Doha	Team
Bronze medal – third place	2023 Changwon	Team
Bronze medal – third place	2023 Changwon	Individual
South Asian Games
Gold medal – first place	2019 Kathmandu	Individual
Gold medal – first place	2019 Kathmandu	Team
World Cup
Gold medal – first place	2022 Cairo	Mixed team
Silver medal – second place	2022 Cairo	Team
Silver medal – second place	2022 Changwon	Team
Bronze medal – third place	2022 Changwon	Mixed team
Bronze medal – third place	2023 Cairo	Individual
Junior World Championships
Gold medal – first place	2021 Lima	Team
Bronze medal – third place	2017 Suhl	Team
Bronze medal – third place	2021 Lima	Mixed team
Junior World Cup
Gold medal – first place	2018 Sydney	Individual
Gold medal – first place	2019 Suhl	Individual
Gold medal – first place	2022 Suhl	Mixed team
Gold medal – first place	2022 Suhl	Team
Silver medal – second place	2018 Sydney	Team
Silver medal – second place	2022 Suhl	Individual
Bronze medal – third place	2018 Suhl	Individual
Men's 25 m standard pistol
Junior World Championships
Gold medal – first place	2017 Suhl	Individual
Silver medal – second place	2017 Suhl	Team
Junior World Cup
Gold medal – first place	2018 Suhl	Mixed team
Gold medal – first place	2018 Suhl	Team
Silver medal – second place	2019 Suhl	Team
Bronze medal – third place	2019 Suhl	Individual
Men's 25 m pistol
Junior World Championships
Gold medal – first place	2017 Suhl	Team
Silver medal – second place	2017 Suhl	Individual

Anish Bhanwala (born 26 September 2002) is an Indian sports shooter. Bhanwala has been a member of the Indian shooting team since 2017, representing the country at the Olympics, World Championships, Commonwealth Games, Asian Games, Asian Championships, South Asian Games, as well as multiple World Cups at both senior and junior levels.

== Early life ==
Bhanwala was born in village Kashandi in Sonipat and brought up in Karnal, Haryana. He attended high school at St. Theresa's Convent Sr. Sec. School.

== Career ==
He represented the country at the U-12 Modern Pentathlon World Championships in 2013 and Asian Modern Pentathlon Championships in 2015. Shooting was his favourite among the pentathlon's five sports.

Anish along with his family moved to New Delhi in 2017 to have the best training facilities available at the Dr. Karni Singh Shooting Range.

In ISSF Junior World Championship 2017, Suhl, Anish won two gold, two silver, and one bronze. In 25m Standard Pistol event Anish created a New World Record by shooting 579/600 score.

In 2017 Commonwealth Shooting Championships, Brisbane, Australia, he won silver in 25m Rapid Fire Men. This was Anish's first senior international competition as a member of Indian squad.

In the Commonwealth Games 2018 at the age of 15 Anish won a gold medal for India and became the youngest Indian to win a gold medal in the Commonwealth Games. He set a new Commonwealth Games final record of 30 hits in the finals.

In ISSF Junior World Cup 2018, Sydney he won one individual gold and one team silver in 25m Rapid Fire Junior Men. This was the first time in history that two siblings won individual Gold in any ISSF series. This was the competition where Anish's sister Muskan too won gold medals.

In ISSF Junior World Cup 2019, Germany, he again won gold in the men's 25m Rapid Fire Pistol.

Anish made his First ISSF Senior's achievement in 2019 in the ISSF World Cup, New Delhi when he shot India's new National Record score of 588/600 in the qualification round and secured the 5th rank in the Finals. In the 65th National Shooting Championship, Bhopal he broke his own previous National record to set a new National record score of 590/600. In the ISSF World Cup, Cairo 2023 Anish won an individual bronze medal.

Anish won two bronze medals in the Asian Shooting Championship, Changwon 2023 and along with the medals he secured the much awaited Olympic Quota in the Rapid Fire Pistol event for India. India won this Olympic quota in the Rapid Fire Pistol event after a long period of 11 years.

== Recognition ==
National Child Award in Sports category.

Mahindra Scorpio TOISA 2018 award for Emerging Player of The Year.
