= Anhad Jawanda =

Indian Shooter (born 1998)

Personal information
- Nationality: Indian
- Born: 26 October 1998 (age 27) Chandigarh, India
- Education: DAV College, Chandigarh (BA)
- Occupation: Shooter
- Height: 1.74 m (5 ft 9 in)
- Weight: 79 kg (174 lb)

Sport
- Country: India
- Sport: Shooting
- Events: 10 meter air pistol, 25 meter rapid fire pistol, 25 meter pistol, and 25 meter standard pistol
- Coached by: Inderjit Singh
Medal record
Representing India
Men's Pistol shooting
ISSF Junior World Championships
Gold medal – first place	2017 Suhl	25m Pistol Jr. Men (Teams)
Silver medal – second place	2017 Suhl	25m Standard Pistol Jr. Men (Teams)
Bronze medal – third place	2017 Suhl	25m Rapid Fire Pistol Jr. Men (Teams)
ISSF Junior World Cup
Gold medal – first place	2016 Gabala	25m Pistol Jr. Men (Individual)
Gold medal – first place	2016 Gabala	25m Pistol Jr. Men (Teams)
Silver medal – second place	2018 Sydney	25m Rapid Fire Pistol Jr. Men (Teams)
Bronze medal – third place	2018 Sydney	10m Air Pistol Jr. Men (Teams)

Anhad Jawanda (Hindi: अनहद जवानदा) is an Indian Shooter. He is from Ludhiana Punjab who competes in the 10 meter air pistol, 25 meter rapid fire pistol, 25 meter pistol, and 25 meter standard pistol events. Anhad has been a part of the Indian Shooting Team since 2015. He has represented India at the ISSF Junior World Cup 2016(Gabala), ISSF Junior World Championship 2017(Suhl) and the ISSF Junior World Cup 2018(Sydney)

== Career ==
In ISSF Junior World Championships, Anhad won one gold medal in 25m Pistol, one silver 25m Standard Pistol and one bronze in Rapid Fire Pistol for India.
Anhad Jawanda won two gold medals in 25m Sports Pistol Jr Men Event at ISSF Junior World Cup 2016, Gabala.
Anahad Jawanda also won the 25-metre sports pistol gold in the 27th Meeting of Shooting Hopes 2017 international junior competition, Plzen, Czech Republic.
