= Yasemin Beyza Yılmaz =

Turkish sports shooter (born 2001)

Personal information
- Nationality: Turkish
- Born: 1 August 2001 (age 24) Ankara, Turkey
- Education: Physical Education and Sport at Gazi University
- Height: 1.60 m (5 ft 3 in)
- Weight: 48 kg (106 lb)

Sport
- Sport: Sports shooting
Medal record
Women's Sports shooting
Representing Turkey
ISSF World Cup
Silver medal – second place	2022 Cairo	10m air pistol Mixed team
European Championships
Silver medal – second place	2021 Osijek	10m air pistol J
ISSF Junior World Championships
Bronze medal – third place	2021 Lima	10m air pistol J
SSF Junior World Cup
Bronze medal – third place	2019 Suhl	10m air pistol J

Yasemin Beyza Yılmaz (born 1 August 2001), also known as Yasemin Yılmaz or Beyza Yılmaz, is a Turkish sports shooter competing in the 10m air pistol event.

== Sport career ==
Yasemin Beyza Yılmaz started her shooting sport career inspired by her mother İlknur Yılmaz, who coaches the national shooting team. She is 1.60 m (5 ft 3 in) tall at 48 kg (106 lb). She is a member of Osmanlı Shooting Sport Club in Ankara, and is coached by Murat Yılmaz. She has been competing since 2013. She shoots right-handed.

Yılnaz took the bronze medal in the 10m air pistol event at the 2019 ISSF Junior World Cup in Suhl, Germany.

She won the silver medal with Şimal Yılmaz and İlayda Nur Çürük in the junior 10m air pistol team event at the 2021 European Championship in Osijek, Croatia.

She took the bronze medal in the 10m air pistol event at the 2021 ISSF Junior World Championships in Lima, Peru.

She became silver medalist in the 10m air pistol Mixed team avent with İsmail Keleş at the 2022 ISSF World Cup in Cairo, Egypt.

Representing her university, she competed in the 10m air pistol event at the 2023 Intercollegiate Shooting Turkish Championships in Trabzon, she won the silver medal.

== Personal life ==
Yasemin Beyza Yılmaz was born in Ankara, Turkey on 1 August 2001. Her father is a police officer and her mother is a coach of the national shooting team and a former national sport shooter.

After completing her high school education at Türk Yurdu Koleji in her hometown, she attended Gazi University in Ankara, for the study of Physical Education and Sport.
