= Japtyesh Singh Jaspal =

Indian sport shooter (born 1999)

Personal information
- Nationality: Indian
- Born: 23 December 1999 (age 26)
- Education: CCET, Chandigarh
- Occupation: Shooter

Sport
- Country: India
- Sport: Shooting
- Event: 25 meter rapid fire pistol
Medal record
Representing India
Men's Pistol shooting
Asian Shooting Championships
| Bronze medal – third place | 2019 Doha | 25m Rapid Fire Pistol Jr. Men (Teams) |
ISSF Junior World Cup
| Bronze medal – third place | 2018 Sydney | 25m Rapid Fire Pistol Jr. Men (Teams) |

Japtyesh Singh Jaspal is an Indian Shooter from Chandigarh who competes in the 25 meter rapid fire pistol and had represented India at the ISSF Junior World Cup 2018(Sydney) and 14th Asian Shooting Championships(Doha). He won the bronze at the ISSF Junior World Cup 2018(Sydney) and 14th Asian Shooting Championships(Doha) in the 25m Rapid Fire Junior Men Team Event.
