= Arjun Babuta =

Indian sport shooter (born 1999)

Personal information
- Born: 24 January 1999 (age 27) Jalalabad, Punjab, India
- Height: 1.68 m (5 ft 6 in)

Sport
- Sport: Shooting
- Event: 10 m air rifle
- Coached by: Deepali Deshpande

Achievements and titles
- Highest world ranking: 3
Medal record
Men's 10 m air rifle shooting
Representing India
Event	1st	2nd	3rd
World Championships	1	0	0
Asian Championships	7	2	1
World Cup	3	2	0
Junior World Cup	1	0	2
World University Games	1	0	0
Total	13	4	3
World Championships
Gold medal – first place	2022 Cairo	Team
Asian Championships
Gold medal – first place	2022 Daegu	Mixed team
Gold medal – first place	2022 Daegu	Team
Gold medal – first place	2023 Changwon	Team
Gold medal – first place	2025 Shymkent	Mixed team
Gold medal – first place	2025 Shymkent	Team
Gold medal – first place	2026 New Delhi	Mixed team
Gold medal – first place	2026 New Delhi	Team
Silver medal – second place	2023 Changwon	Individual
Silver medal – second place	2026 New Delhi	Individual
Bronze medal – third place	2024 Jakarta	Team
World Cup
Gold medal – first place	2022 Changwon	Individual
Gold medal – first place	2022 Changwon	Team
Gold medal – first place	2025 Munich	Mixed team
Silver medal – second place	2024 Cairo	Mixed team
Silver medal – second place	2025 Lima	Individual
Junior World Cup
Gold medal – first place	2016 Gabala	Team
Bronze medal – third place	2016 Gabala	Individual
Bronze medal – third place	2018 Sydney	Individual
World University Games
Gold medal – first place	2021 Chengdu	Team

Arjun Babuta (born 24 January 1999) is an Indian sport shooter who competes in the 10 m air rifle event. Babuta competed at the 2024 Paris Olympics, where he narrowly missed the podium with a fourth-place finish in the men's 10 m air rifle event.

== Early and personal life ==
Babuta was born on 24 January 1999 in Jalalabad, Punjab, India. He is the son of Neeraj Babuta and renowned Punjabi author-poet Deepti Babuta. He later moved to Chandigarh where he began his career in shooting. He obtained his undergraduate degree from DAV College, Chandigarh, and has a mass communication and journalism degree from Lovely Professional University.

Babuta raised the issue of not receiving support from the Punjab State Government even though he was allegedly promised a government job in 2022.

== Career ==
Babuta won one gold medal and one bronze medal in the 10 m air rifle event at 2016 Junior World Cup in Gabala. In 2017, he won silver at the 10th Asian Airgun Championship, Wako City in Japan.

He also won the silver in the 27th Meeting of Shooting Hopes 2017 international junior competition, Plzen, Czech Republic. He won one bronze in 2018 Junior World Cup in Sydney.

A career-threatening back problem kept him out of action from 2018 to 2020. He won gold medals at the 2022 World Cup in Changwon in 10 m air rifle, both in the individual and team events.

At the 2023 Asian Shooting Championships, Babuta won silver in the 10 m air rifle event, earning India a quota place to the 2024 Paris Olympics. He also won gold in the team event with Divyansh Singh Panwar and Hriday Hazarika.

At the 2024 Pairs Olympics, the pair of Babuta and Ramita Jindal finished 6th among 28 teams in the qualifying round of the 10 m air rifle mixed team event, failing to progress to the medal rounds. Babuta made it to the final of men's 10 m air rifle after placing seventh in qualification. He finished fourth in the closely-contested final.
