= Rajkanwar Singh Sandhu =

Indian sport shooter

Personal information
- Nationality: Indian
- Born: August 13, 2002 (age 24) Patiala, Punjab, India
- Occupation: Shooter

Sport
- Country: India
- Sport: Shooting
- Events: 25 meter rapid fire pistol 25 meter standard pistol 25 meter center fire pistol 50 meter free pistol 10 meter air pistol 25 meter sports pistol
Medal record
Representing India
Men's Pistol shooting
ISSF World Championship
Gold medal – first place	2018 Changwon	standard Pistol Jr (Team)
Gold medal – first place	2018 Changwon	sports Pistol Jr (Team)
Bronze medal – third place	2026 Doha	25 m centre fire pistol team
Asian Shooting Championships
Gold medal – first place	2025 Shymkent	25 m center fire pistol
Gold medal – first place	2025 Shymkent	25 m center fire pistol team
Silver medal – second place	2019 Doha	sports Pistol Jr (Team)
Silver medal – second place	2023 Korea	25m Rapid Fire Jr. Men (Team)
ISSF Junior World Championships
Silver medal – second place	2023 Korea	25m Rapid Fire Jr Men (Team)
ISSF Junior World Cup
Bronze medal – third place	2018 Australia	Rapid Fire Pistol Jr (Team)
Bronze medal – third place	2018 Suhl	Standard Pistol Jr
Gold medal – first place	2018 Suhl	Standard Pistol Jr (Team)
Gold medal – first place	2018 Suhl	Sports Pistol Jr(Team)
Gold medal – first place	2019 Suhl	Sports Pistol Jr (Team)
Silver medal – second place	2019 Suhl	Standard Pistol Jr (Team)
Bronze medal – third place	2019 Suhl	Rapid Fire Pistol Jr (Team)
Silver medal – second place	2022 Germany	25 m Sports Pistol Men
Gold medal – first place	2022 Germany	25 m Standard Pistol (Mix-Team)
Silver medal – second place	2023 Germany	25 m Rapid Fire Pistol Jr Men (Team)
Silver medal – second place	2023 Korea	25 m Rapid Fire Pistol Jr Men (Team)
FISU World University Championships
Silver medal – second place	2024 Delhi	25m Rapid Fire Pistol Men

Rajkanwar Singh Sandhu (born 13 August 2002) is an Indian professional sport shooter from Patiala, Punjab. He competes in various pistol shooting disciplines, including the 10m Air Pistol, 25m Rapid Fire Pistol, 25m Standard Pistol, 25m Centre Fire Pistol, 25m Sports Pistol, and 50m Free Pistol. Sandhu has represented India at several international shooting competitions, including the Asian Shooting Championships, ISSF World Championship, ISSF Junior World Championships and the ISSF Junior World Cup.

== Career ==
Sandhu has represented India at several international shooting competitions, including the Asian Shooting Championships, ISSF World Championship, ISSF Junior World Championships and ISSF Junior World Cup,
