= Shooting at the 2024 Summer Olympics – Men's skeet =

Olympic shooting event

Men's skeet at the Games of the XXXIII Olympiad
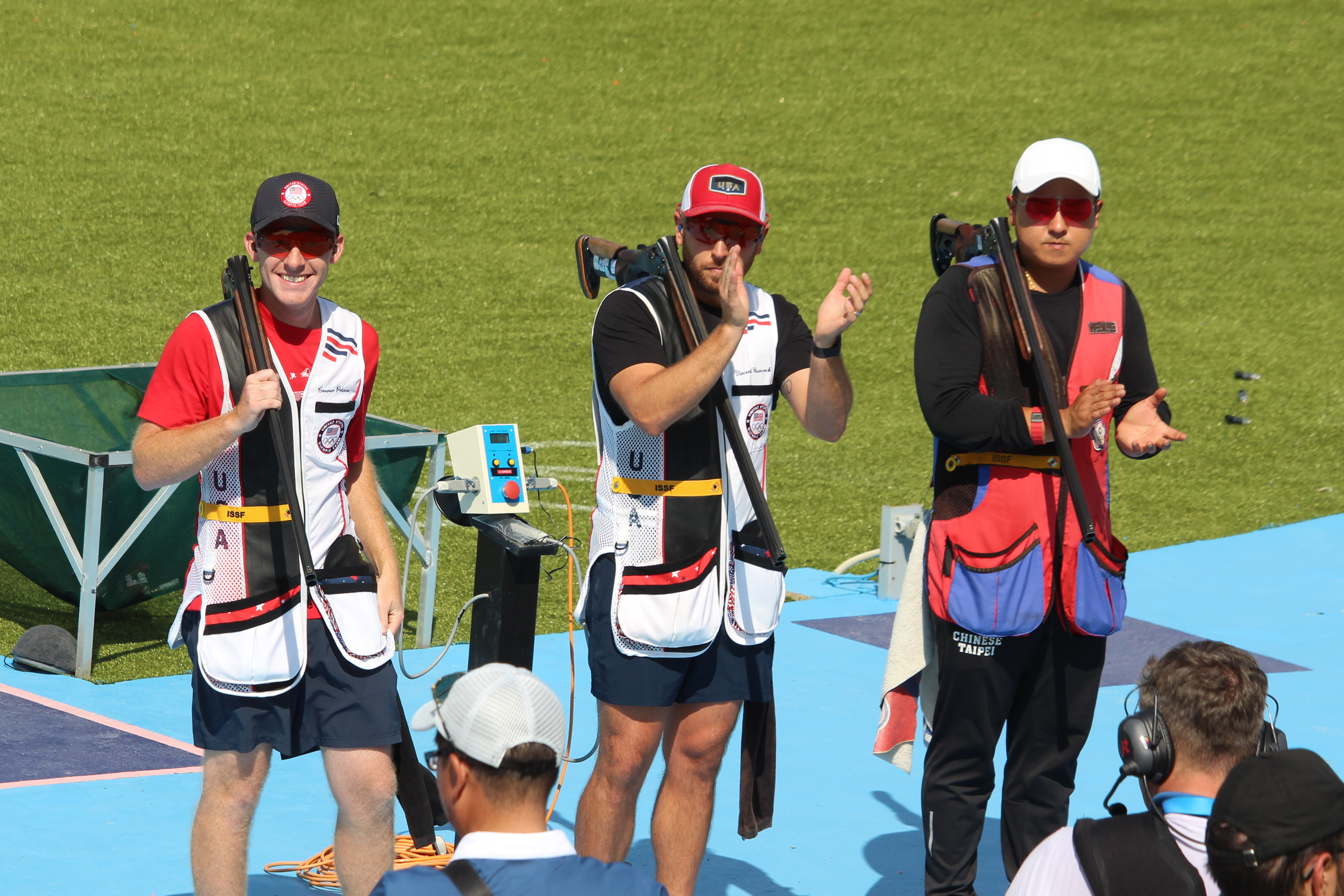
- Olympic podium
- Venue: Chateauroux Shooting Centre
- Dates: 2–3 August
- Competitors: 30 from 25 nations

Medalists
1st place, gold medalist(s)		Vincent Hancock	United States
2nd place, silver medalist(s)		Conner Prince	United States
3rd place, bronze medalist(s)		Lee Meng-yuan	Chinese Taipei

The men's skeet event at the 2024 Summer Olympics took place on 2 and 3 August 2024 at the Chateauroux Shooting Ctr.

== Records ==
Prior to this competition, the existing world and Olympic records were as follows.

Qualification records
World record	Valerio Luchini (ITA)	125	Beijing, China	9 July 2014
Olympic record	Tammaro Cassandro (ITA)	124	Tokyo, Japan	26 July 2021

== Schedule ==
All times are Central European Summer Time (UTC+2)

Date	Time	Round
Friday, 2 August 2024; Saturday, 3 August 2024	9:30	Qualification
Saturday, 3 August 2024	15:30	Final

== Results ==
=== Qualification ===
Rank	Athlete	Country	1	2	3	4	5	Total	Shoot-off	Notes
1	Conner Prince	United States	24	25	25	25	25	124	+12	Q, EQOR
2	Tammaro Cassandro	Italy	25	25	24	25	25	124	+11	Q, EQOR
3	Lee Meng-yuan	Chinese Taipei	25	24	25	25	25	124	+7	Q, EQOR
4	Vincent Hancock	United States	25	25	25	24	24	123		Q
5	Stefan Nilsson	Sweden	24	24	24	25	25	122	+6	Q
6	Nicolás Pacheco	Peru	25	25	23	24	25	122	+5	Q
7	Gabriele Rossetti	Italy	22	25	25	25	25	122	+3	
8	Sven Korte	Germany	25	23	25	24	25	122	+1	
9	Éric Delaunay	France	25	24	25	23	25	122	+1	
10	Azmy Mehelba	Egypt	24	25	22	25	25	121		
11	Efthimios Mitas	Greece	25	24	24	24	24	121		CB: 15
12	Jakub Tomeček	Czech Republic	25	24	24	24	24	121		CB: 14
13	Mohammad Al-Daihani	Kuwait	24	24	22	25	25	120		
14	Jesper Hansen	Denmark	22	23	25	24	25	119		
15	Rashid Saleh Al-Athba	Qatar	24	22	23	24	25	118		
16	Kim Min-su	South Korea	25	22	23	24	24	118		
17	Lyu Jianlin	China	24	23	24	23	24	118		
18	Marcus Svensson	Sweden	24	25	22	23	24	118		
19	Charalambos Chalkiadakis	Greece	25	23	24	23	23	118		
20	Eetu Kallioinen	Finland	23	22	23	24	25	117		
21	Sebastián Bermúdez	Guatemala	23	25	21	25	23	117		
22	Erik Watndal	Norway	25	25	22	22	23	117		
23	Hákon Svavarsson	Iceland	23	23	23	22	25	116		
24	Anantjeet Singh Naruka	India	23	22	23	24	24	116		
25	Joshua Bell	Australia	24	23	23	24	22	116		
26	Eduard Yechshenko	Kazakhstan	21	23	22	24	25	115		
27	Federico Gil	Argentina	24	21	24	23	23	115		
28	Peeter Jürisson	Estonia	24	20	22	23	24	113		
29	Omar Ibrahim	Egypt	22	20	20	22	22	106		
30	Jorge Antonio Salhe	Palestine	22	23	18	17	20	100		

=== Final ===
Rank	Athlete	Series					Notes
Rank	Athlete	1	2	3	4	5	Notes
1st place, gold medalist(s)	Vincent Hancock (USA)	20	29	38	48	58	
2nd place, silver medalist(s)	Conner Prince (USA)	19	29	39	48	57	
3rd place, bronze medalist(s)	Lee Meng-yuan (TPE)	19	29	37	45		
4	Tammaro Cassandro (ITA)	19	29	36			
5	Stefan Nilsson (SWE)	18	27				
6	Nicolás Pacheco (PER)	17					
