= Morgan Phillips (sport shooter) =

American sport shooter

Personal information
- Nationality: United States
- Born: 27 March 1998 (age 28) Salisbury, Maryland, USA
- Height: 5 ft 4 in (163 cm)

Sport
- Country: United States
- Sport: Sports shooting
- Events: 50 meter rifle three positions; 50 meter rifle prone
Medal record
Women's shooting
Representing United States
World Championships
Silver medal – second place	2017 Suhl	50m rifle prone team junior
Silver medal – second place	2018 Changwon	50m rifle 3P team junior
Bronze medal – third place	2017 Suhl	50m rifle 3P team junior
Bronze medal – third place	2018 Changwon	50m rifle prone team junior
Junior World Cup
Gold medal – first place	2018 Suhl	50m rifle prone
Silver medal – second place	2018 Suhl	50m rifle three positions
Silver medal – second place	2018 Suhl	50m rifle three positions team

Morgan Phillips (born 27 March 1998) is the University of Memphis head rifle coach (2021–present). She was an American NCAA sports shooter. She competed in the 50 meter rifle prone and 50 meter rifle three positions events at junior level at the 2018 ISSF World Shooting Championships, where she won four medals, and the 2018 ISSF Junior World Cup, where she won three.

She also won the NCAA Smallbore Championship at the 2017 and 2018 NCAA Rifle Championships, while studying at West Virginia University.
