= 2019 ISSF Junior World Cup =

International sport shooting competition

The 2019 ISSF Junior World Cup is the annual edition of the ISSF Junior World Cup, governed by the International Shooting Sport Federation

== Men's results ==
=== Rifle events ===
==== Individual Results ====
50 meter rifle three positions			50 meter rifle prone			10 meter air rifle		
Suhl Germany (12-20 Jul)			Suhl Germany (12-20 Jul)			Suhl Germany (12-20 Jul)		
1st place, gold medalist(s)	Aishwary Pratap Singh Tomar (IND)	459.3 WRJ	1st place, gold medalist(s)	Stefan Wadlegger (AUT)	623.4	1st place, gold medalist(s)	Grigorii Shamakov (RUS)	250.0
2nd place, silver medalist(s)	Zalan Pekler (HUN)	454.8	2nd place, silver medalist(s)	Grigorii Shamakov (RUS)	622.8	2nd place, silver medalist(s)	Zhang Changhong (CHN)	249.1
3rd place, bronze medalist(s)	Zhang Changhong (CHN)	442.8	3rd place, bronze medalist(s)	Zhang Changhong (CHN)	622.3	3rd place, bronze medalist(s)	Xu Yuannan (CHN)	228.6

==== Team Results ====
50 meter rifle three positions			50 meter rifle prone			10 meter air rifle		
Suhl Germany (12-20 Jul)			Suhl Germany (12-20 Jul)			Suhl Germany (12-20 Jul)		
1st place, gold medalist(s)	(CHN) Zhang Changhong Xu Yuannan Tang Chenliang	3502-187x	1st place, gold medalist(s)	(GER) Max Frieder Braun Luc Fabian Dingerdissen Luka Alexander Ribbe	1861.7	1st place, gold medalist(s)	(CHN) Xu Yuannan Zhang Changhong Liu Yuqi	1877.8 EWRJ
2nd place, silver medalist(s)	(NOR) Jon-Hermann Hegg Vegard Nordhagen Aleksander Teisrud	3490-159x	2nd place, silver medalist(s)	(NOR) Jon-Hermann Hegg Vegard Nordhagen Aleksander Teisrud	1852.5	2nd place, silver medalist(s)	(IND) Yash Vardhan Hriday Hazarika Paarth Makhija	1877.4
3rd place, bronze medalist(s)	(RUS) Gigorii Shamakov Savelii Triapitsyn Ilian Muliukov	3488-158x	3rd place, bronze medalist(s)	(AUT) Stefan Wadlegger Andreas Thum Patrick Diem	1852.3	3rd place, bronze medalist(s)	(HUN) Marton Istvan Klenczner Soma Rickard Hammerl Zalan Pekler	1870.1

=== Pistols Events ===
==== Individual Results ====
50 meter pistol			25 meter rapid fire pistol			10 meter air pistol			25 meter standard pistol			25 meter pistol		
Suhl Germany (12-20 Jul)			Suhl Germany (12-20 Jul)			Suhl Germany (12-20 Jul)			Suhl Germany (12-20 Jul)			Suhl Germany (12-20 Jul)		
1st place, gold medalist(s)	Gaurav Rana (IND)	553-15x	1st place, gold medalist(s)	Anish Bhanwala (IND)	29	1st place, gold medalist(s)	Sarabjot Singh (IND)	239.6	1st place, gold medalist(s)	Udhayveer Sindhu (IND)	575-19x	1st place, gold medalist(s)	Xia Qi (CHN)	584-23x
2nd place, silver medalist(s)	Arjun Singh Cheema (IND)	551-12x	2nd place, silver medalist(s)	Egor Ismakov (RUS)	23	2nd place, silver medalist(s)	Wang Zhehao (CHN)	237.7	2nd place, silver medalist(s)	Adarsh Singh (IND)	568-07x	2nd place, silver medalist(s)	Yuriy Kolesnyk (UKR)	584-19x
3rd place, bronze medalist(s)	Ihor Solovei (UKR)	550-10x	3rd place, bronze medalist(s)	Florian Peter (GER)	19	3rd place, bronze medalist(s)	Lu Shichang (CHN)	217.0	3rd place, bronze medalist(s)	Anish Anish (IND)	566-10x	3rd place, bronze medalist(s)	Florian Peter (GER)	583-19x

==== Team Results ====
50 meter pistol			25 meter rapid fire pistol			10 meter air pistol			25 meter standard pistol			25 meter pistol		
Suhl Germany (12-20 Jul)			Suhl Germany (12-20 Jul)			Suhl Germany (12-20 Jul)			Suhl Germany (12-20 Jul)			Suhl Germany (12-20 Jul)		
1st place, gold medalist(s)	(IND) Arjun Singh Cheema Gaurav Rana Vijayveer Sidhu	1651-34x	1st place, gold medalist(s)	(GER) Florian Peter Christoph Lutz Stefan Max Holl	1713-48x	1st place, gold medalist(s)	(CHN) Wang Zhehao Lu Shichang Zhang Yifan	1716-47x	1st place, gold medalist(s)	(IND) Udhayveer Sindhu Vijayveer Sindhu Adarsh Singh	1707-38x WRJ	1st place, gold medalist(s)	(IND) Rajkanwar Singh Sandhu Adarsh Singh Vijayveer Sindhu	1738-56x
2nd place, silver medalist(s)	(BLR) Abdul-Aziz Kurdzi Vladislav Oganezov Uladzislau Dzemesh	1610-24x	2nd place, silver medalist(s)	(CHN) Xia Qi He Shiyu Song Weichen	1710-47x	2nd place, silver medalist(s)	(BLR) Abdul-Aziz Kurdzi Vladislav Oganezov Yauheni Lamashevich	1716-47x	2nd place, silver medalist(s)	(IND) Anish Anish Rajkanwar Sandhu Dilshaan Kelley	1676-31x	2nd place, silver medalist(s)	(CHN) Xia Qi He Shiyu Song Weichen	1728-51x
3rd place, bronze medalist(s)	(RUS) Andrei Chilikov Egor Vyskrebtsev Aleksandr Kondrashin	1608-20x	3rd place, bronze medalist(s)	(IND) Agneya Kaushik Rajkanwar Singh Sandhu Udhayveer Sidhu	1709-44x	3rd place, bronze medalist(s)	(GER) Robin Walter Jonathan Niklas Mader Jan Luca Karstedt	1715-48x	3rd place, bronze medalist(s)	(CHN) Xia Qi He Shiyu Song Weichen	1673-24x	3rd place, bronze medalist(s)	(CZE) Antonin Tupy Matej Rampula Jan Vildomec	1726-53x

=== Shotgun Events ===
==== Individual Results ====
Trap			Skeet		
Suhl Germany (12-20 Jul)			Suhl Germany (12-20 Jul)		
1st place, gold medalist(s)	Lorenzo Ferrari (ITA)	44	1st place, gold medalist(s)	Conner Lynn Prince (USA)	56
2nd place, silver medalist(s)	Mitchell Iles-Crevatin (AUS)	41	2nd place, silver medalist(s)	Wu Liangliang (CHN)	47
3rd place, bronze medalist(s)	Matteo Dambrosi (ITA)	33	3rd place, bronze medalist(s)	Oliver George Harrison (GBR)	41

==== Team Results ====
Trap			Skeet		
Suhl Germany (12-20 Jul)			Suhl Germany (12-20 Jul)		
1st place, gold medalist(s)	(ITA) Lorenzo Ferrari Edoardo Antonioli Matteo Marongiu	354	1st place, gold medalist(s)	(FIN) Sami Aaltonen Oskari Lehtimaeki Niko Sulkonen	350
2nd place, silver medalist(s)	(AUS) Mitchell Iles-Crevatin Thomas Armstrong Adam Bylsma	350	2nd place, silver medalist(s)	(USA) Conner Lynn Prince Alexander Ahlin Benjamin Joseph Keller	349
3rd place, bronze medalist(s)	(FRA) Jason Picaud Clement Bourgue Nathan Thuillier	344	3rd place, bronze medalist(s)	(CHN) Long Jue Wu Liangliang Wang Zhangyue	349

== Women's Results ==
=== Rifle events ===
==== Individual Results ====
50 meter rifle three positions			50 meter rifle prone			10 meter air rifle		
Suhl Germany (12-20 Jul)			Suhl Germany (12-20 Jul)			Suhl Germany (12-20 Jul)		
1st place, gold medalist(s)	Anna Janssen (GER)	453.2	1st place, gold medalist(s)	Jeanette Hegg Duestad (NOR)	627.9 WRJ	1st place, gold medalist(s)	Elavenil Valarivan (IND)	251.6
2nd place, silver medalist(s)	Melissa Ruschel (GER)	452.2	2nd place, silver medalist(s)	Sara Karasova (CZE)	627.6	2nd place, silver medalist(s)	Mehuli Ghosh (IND)	250.2
3rd place, bronze medalist(s)	Jeanette Hegg Duestad (NOR)	441.7	3rd place, bronze medalist(s)	Sheileen Waibel (AUT)	627.2	3rd place, bronze medalist(s)	Oceanne Muller (FRA)	228.0

==== Team Results ====
50 meter rifle three positions			50 meter rifle prone			10 meter air rifle		
Suhl Germany (12-20 Jul)				Suhl Germany (12-20 Jul)			Suhl Germany (12-20 Jul)	
1st place, gold medalist(s)	(GER) Anna Janssen Melissa Ruschel Larissa Weindorf	3509 - 179x WRJ	1st place, gold medalist(s)	(NOR) Jeanette Hegg Duestad, Karina Stette, Tonje Engevik	1865.5 WRJ	1st place, gold medalist(s)	(IND) Mehuli Ghosh Elavenil Valarivan Shreya Agrawal	1883.3 WRJ
2nd place, silver medalist(s)	(CHN) Fu Yutian Chen Fanghui Hou Min	3509 - 178x WRJ	2nd place, silver medalist(s)	(CHN) Fu Yutian Hou Min Chen Fanghui	1864.2	2nd place, silver medalist(s)	(HUN) Dorina Toma Gitta Bajos Dorina Lovasz	1880.0
3rd place, bronze medalist(s)	(HUN) Dorina Toma Gitta Bajos Lea Horvath	3508 - 169x	3rd place, bronze medalist(s)	(CZE) Sara Karasova Katerina Stefankova Sabina Thurnwaldova	1859.1	3rd place, bronze medalist(s)	(SGP) Tan Qian Xiu Adele Ho Xiu Yi Martina Lindsay Veloso	1877.4

=== Pistols Events ===
==== Individual Results ====
50 meter pistol			25 meter pistol			25 meter standard pistol			10 meter air pistol		
Suhl Germany (12-20 Jul)			Suhl Germany (12-20 Jul)			Suhl Germany (12-20 Jul)			Suhl Germany (12-20 Jul)		
1st place, gold medalist(s)	Nadezhda Koloda (RUS)	543-09x	1st place, gold medalist(s)	Miroslava Mincheva (BUL)	30	1st place, gold medalist(s)	Chawisa Paduka (IND)	567-10x	1st place, gold medalist(s)	Sevval Tarhan (TUR)	241.8
2nd place, silver medalist(s)	Priya Raghav (IND)	535-08x	2nd place, silver medalist(s)	Camille Jedrzejewski (FRA)	28	2nd place, silver medalist(s)	Annabelle Pioch (FRA)	557-09x	2nd place, silver medalist(s)	Esha Singh (IND)	236.6
3rd place, bronze medalist(s)	Vibhuti Bhatia (IND)	531-06x	3rd place, bronze medalist(s)	Zhu Siying (CHN)	25	3rd place, bronze medalist(s)	Wang Keyi (CHN)	556-13x	3rd place, bronze medalist(s)	Yasemin Beyza Yılmaz (TUR)	215.4

==== Team Results ====
50 meter pistol			25 meter pistol			25 meter standard pistol			10 meter air pistol		
Suhl Germany (12-20 Jul)			Suhl Germany (12-20 Jul)			Suhl Germany (12-20 Jul)			Suhl Germany (12-20 Jul)		
1st place, gold medalist(s)	(RUS)Nadezhda Koloda Albina Bevz Olga Schemelinina	1559-17x	1st place, gold medalist(s)	(CHN) Zhu Siying Wang Keyi Li Xueying	1734-47x EWRJ	1st place, gold medalist(s)	(IND) Wang Keyi Zhu Siying Li Xueying	1666-36x	1st place, gold medalist(s)	(ITA) Brunella Aria Margherita Veccaro Maria Varricchio	1702-43x
2nd place, silver medalist(s)	(IND)Priya Raghav Vibhuti Bhatia Harshada Nithave	1557-16x	2nd place, silver medalist(s)	(FRA) Annabelle Pioch Camille Jedrzejewski Kateline Nicolas	1729-49x	2nd place, silver medalist(s)	(FRA) Annabelle Pioch Camille Jedrzejewski Kateline Nicolas	1645-33x	2nd place, silver medalist(s)	(GER) Andrea Katharina Heckner Vanessa Seeger Tabea Isabell Ocker	1691-31x
3rd place, bronze medalist(s)	(BLR) Vulyana Rohach Hanna Moladava Liubou Stralchonak	1524-11x	3rd place, bronze medalist(s)	(THA) Chawisa Paduka Kanjakorn Hirunphoem Viramon Kidarn	1718-45x	3rd place, bronze medalist(s)	(THA) Chawisa Paduka Kanjakorn Hirunphoem Natsara Champalat	1635-21x	3rd place, bronze medalist(s)	(HUN) Miriam Jako Sara Rahel Fabian Krisztina Panna Komaromi	1687-30x

=== Shotgun Events ===
==== Individual Results ====
Trap			Skeet		
Suhl Germany (12-20 Jul)			Suhl Germany (12-20 Jul)		
1st place, gold medalist(s)	Faith Alexa Pendergrass (USA)	39	1st place, gold medalist(s)	Austen Jewell Smith (USA)	52 S-off: 4
2nd place, silver medalist(s)	Selin Ali (BUL)	35	2nd place, silver medalist(s)	Samantha Simonton (USA)	52 S-off: 3
3rd place, bronze medalist(s)	Gaia Ragazzini (ITA)	29	3rd place, bronze medalist(s)	Katharina Monika Jacob (USA)	43

==== Team Results ====
Trap			Skeet		
Suhl Germany (12-20 Jul)			Suhl Germany (12-20 Jul)		
1st place, gold medalist(s)	(CHN) Zhang Ting; Chen Hongdan; Hong Xinru	331	1st place, gold medalist(s)	(USA) Austen Jewell Smith; Katharina Monika Jacob; Samantha Simonton	356 WRJ
2nd place, silver medalist(s)	(USA) Faith Alexa Pendergrass; Carey Garrison; Nicola Manhave	322	2nd place, silver medalist(s)	(CHN) Li Wenji; Lu Yikai; Song zhangyi	336
3rd place, bronze medalist(s)	(ITA) Gaia Ragazzini; Sofia Littame; Sharyn Littame	317	3rd place, bronze medalist(s)	(ITA) Giada Longhi; Sara Bongini; Giulia Basso	319

== Mixed Team Results ==
	10 meter air pistol		10 meter air rifle		Trap	
Suhl Germany (12-20 Jul)	1st place, gold medalist(s)	Andrea Heckner / Robin Walter (GER) 16	1st place, gold medalist(s)	Armina Sadeghian / Amir Siavash Zolfagharian (IRI) 17	1st place, gold medalist(s)	Zhang Ting / Li Siwey (CHN) 35
Suhl Germany (12-20 Jul)	2nd place, silver medalist(s)	Liubou Stralchonak / Abdul-Aziz Kurdzi (IND) 12	2nd place, silver medalist(s)	Shreya Agrawal / Yash Vardhan (IND) 11	2nd place, silver medalist(s)	Sofia Littame / Lorenzo Ferrari (ITA) 33
Suhl Germany (12-20 Jul)	3rd place, bronze medalist(s)	Esha Singh / Gaurav Rana (IND) 16 in BMM	3rd place, bronze medalist(s)	Mehuli Ghosh / Hriday Hazarika (IND) 16 in BMM	3rd place, bronze medalist(s)	Jeana Garrison / Roe Reynolds (USA) 37 in BMM

(BMM - Bronze Medal Match)

== Medal table ==
Rank	Nation	Gold	Silver	Bronze	Total
1	India (IND)	10	9	5	24
2	China (CHN)	8	8	8	24
3	Germany (GER)	5	2	3	10
4	United States (USA)	4	3	2	9
5	Russia (RUS)	3	2	2	7
6	Italy (ITA)	3	1	4	8
7	Norway (NOR)	2	2	1	5
8	Bulgaria (BUL)	1	1	0	2
9	Austria (AUT)	1	0	2	3
9	Thailand (THA)	1	0	2	3
11	Turkey (TUR)	1	0	1	2
12	Finland (FIN)	1	0	0	1
12	Iran (IRI)	1	0	0	1
14	France (FRA)	0	4	2	6
15	Belarus (BLR)	0	3	1	4
16	Hungary (HUN)	0	2	3	5
17	Australia (AUS)	0	2	0	2
18	Czech Republic (CZE)	0	1	2	3
19	Ukraine (UKR)	0	1	1	2
20	Great Britain (GBR)	0	0	1	1
20	Singapore (SGP)	0	0	1	1
Totals (21 entries)		41	41	41	123
