= Conner Prince =

American sport shooter

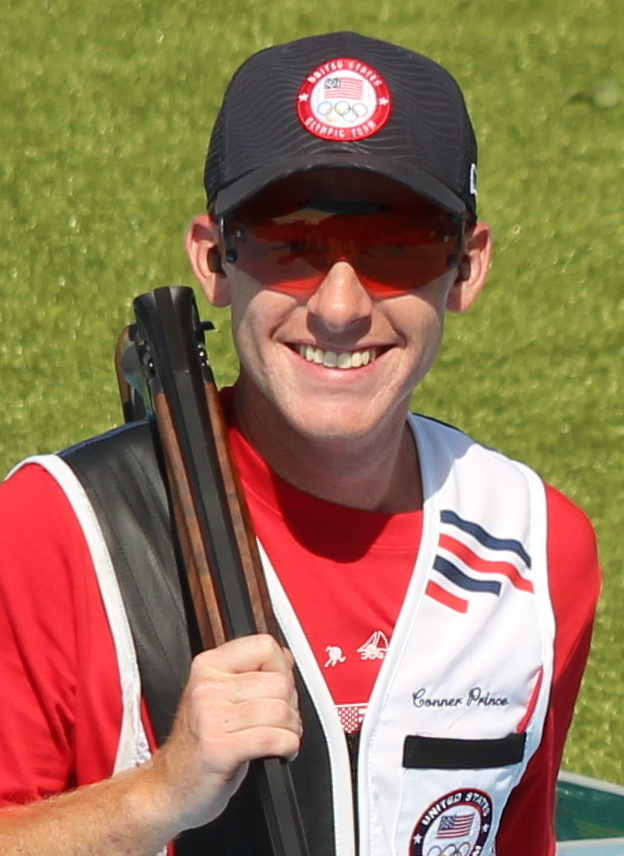
- Prince at the 2024 Summer Olympics

Personal information
- Born: March 28, 2000 (age 26) Fort Worth, Texas, U.S.

Sport
- Country: United States
- Sport: Sports shooting
Medal record
Men's shooting
Representing United States
Olympic Games
Silver medal – second place	2024 Paris	Skeet
World Championships
Silver medal – second place	2019 Lonato del Garda	Men's junior skeet team
World Cup
Gold medal – first place	2023 Rabat	Men's skeet
Gold medal – first place	2023 Rabat	Mixed skeet team
Silver medal – second place	2024 Lonato	Men's skeet
Junior World Cup
Gold medal – first place	2019 Suhl	Men's skeet
Silver medal – second place	2019 Suhl	Men's skeet team

Conner Prince (born March 28, 2000) is an American sport shooter. He competed at the 2024 Summer Olympics, winning the silver medal in the men's skeet event, coming second to his coach Vincent Hancock.

== Biography ==
Prince was born in Fort Worth but is from Burleson, Texas. He began shooting with his high school team in 2014 before beginning Olympic Skeet in 2017. Prince graduated from Centennial High School.

Prince qualified for the Olympics in 2024, and was a senior at Tarleton State University at the time.
