= Ayushi Podder =

Indian sport shooter

Personal information
- Nationality: Indian
- Born: 23 October 2000 (age 25)
- Height: 155cm(5ft 1in)
- Weight: 52 kg

Sport
- Country: India
- Sport: Shooting
- Event(s): 50m 3Position, Air rifle
- University team: Panjab University
- Team: Indian team
- Coached by: Pankaj Podder
Medal record
Women's shooting
Representing India
Asian Championships
Gold medal – first place	2023 Changwon	50 m rifle 3 positions team

Ayushi Podder (born 23 October 2000) is an Indian sport shooter. She is from Sheoraphuli, Hooghly, West Bengal. She is currently employed in Eastern Railway HQ, Kolkata.

== Biography ==
Ayushi Podder was born on 23 October 2000 and is currently ranked India seeded 2 in 50m 3position Rifle category in senior division by National Rifle Association of India. Aged 13, Podder underwent training along her father Pankaj Podder at Serampore Rifle Club. In 2014, She played her very first Junior Nationals at Dr Karni Singh Shooting Range, Delhi. Since then Ayushi is getting trained at her father's own club Bullseye Shooting Academy.

Podder won National and International titles at various events. She bagged a silver medal home in 62nd National Shooting Championship in 50m.3position in Juniors and two gold medals in 10 m Air Rifle team event in Juniors and Youth held at Trivandrum, Kerala.

At present, Podder is sponsored by Sony Pictures Network and widely supported by Lakshay Sports Foundation.
