= Akihito Shimizu =

Japanese sports shooter (born 1999)

Akihito Shimizu 清水彰人
Personal information
- Born: 28 April 1999 Naruto, Tokushima, Japan

Sport
- Country: Japan
- Sport: Sports shooting
Medal record
Representing Japan
Men's Shooting
ISSF Junior World Championships
Gold medal – first place	2017 Suhl	10 m air rifle teams

Akihito Shimizu (清水 彰人, Shimizu Akihito; born 28 April 1999) is a Japanese sports shooter, born in Naruto, Tokushima. He won a gold medal in the 10 m air rifle team event with his teammates at the 2017 ISSF Junior World Championships in Suhl, Germany. He was the flag bearer for the Japanese team at the opening ceremony of the 2022 Asian Games in Hangzhou, China.
