= Sergei Evglevski =

Australian sports shooter

Personal information
- Nationality: Australian
- Born: 15 October 1997 (age 28) Minsk, Belarus
- Home town: Berwick, Victoria, Australia
- Height: 185 cm (6 ft 1 in)

Sport
- Sport: Sports shooting
- Event: 25 metre rapid fire pistol
- Club: Yarra Pistol Club
- Coached by: Vladimir Galiabovitch

Sergei Evglevski (born 15 October 1997) is an Australian sports shooter. Evglevski competed in the men's 25 metre rapid fire pistol event at the 2020 Summer Olympics. He did not score sufficient points to advance past qualification.
