= Tsai Pai-sheng =

Taiwanese sports shooter (born 1935)

Personal information
- Nationality: Taiwanese
- Born: 14 February 1935
- Died: 3 April 2011 (aged 76)

Sport
- Sport: Sports shooting

Tsai Pai-sheng (14 February 1935 – 3 April 2011) was a Taiwanese sports shooter. He competed at the 1984 Summer Olympics and the 1988 Summer Olympics.
