= Ahvar Rizvi =

Indian sport shooter

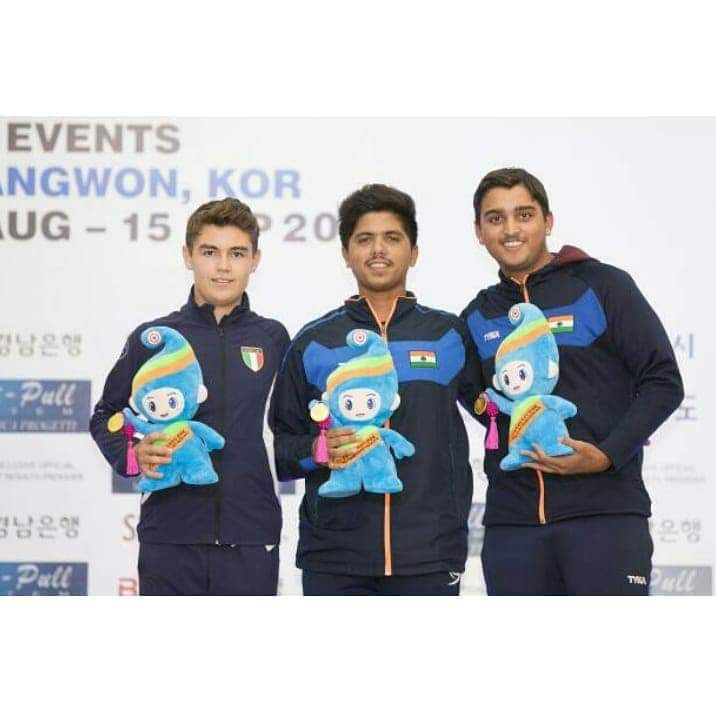

Personal information
- Nationality: Indian
- Born: 15 December 1999 (age 26) Meerut, India
- Height: 5’4 ft
- Weight: 56 kg (123 lb)

Sport
- Country: India
- Sport: Shooting
- Event: Double trap, Olympic Trap
Medal record
Representing India
Men's Double Trap, Olympic Trap
World Shotgun Championships
Gold medal – first place	2017 Moscow	Double Trap Team
Gold medal – first place	2018 Changwon	Individual
Gold medal – first place	2018 Changwon	Double Trap Team

Ahvar Rizvi (born 15 December 1999) is an Indian sports shooter. He won a gold medal and a team silver medal at the ISSF Shotgun World Championship 2017 in Moscow, Russia. He won a gold medal and a team gold medal at the World Championship 2018 in Changwon, South Korea.

== Early life ==
Ahvar Rizvi was born on 15 December 1999 in Mahal village, Meerut, Uttar Pradesh. His father's name is Asif Hasan and mother's name is Farin Khatun.

== Career ==
Ahvar Rizvi started his shooting career in 2015. He won a Gold medal and Team Silver medal at the ISSF Shotgun World Championship 2017 in Moscow, Russia. He won a Gold Medal And a Team Gold medal at the World Championship 2018 in Changwon, South Korea. In 2018 he won Gold medal in men's double trap at the 62nd National Shotgun Championship in Jaipur.
