= 2016 European Junior Shooting Championships =

The 2016 European Junior Shooting Championships (25/50m) were held in Männiku Shooting Range, Tallinn, Estonia from June 12 to 19,2016.

== Men's events ==
Event	Gold	Silver	Bronze
25m Pistol	Alexander Petrov (RUS)	Nicolas Thiel (FRA)	Oskar Miliwek (POL)
25m Pistol TEAM	Russia	France	Germany
25m Standard Pistol	Frederik Zurschmiede (SUI)	Yuriy Kolesnyk (UKR)	Alexander Petrov (RUS)
25m Standard Pistol TEAM	Switzerland	Germany	Ukraine
25m Rapid Fire Pistol	Lukas Skoumal (CZE)	Nicolas Thiel (FRA)	Maksym Horodynets (UKR)
25m Rapid Fire Pistol TEAM	Germany	Ukraine	France
50m Pistol	Simon Weiss (GER)	Artem Chernousov (RUS)	Oleksandr Samostrol (UKR)
50m Pistol TEAM	Russia	Ukraine	Germany
50m Rifle Prone	István Péni (HUN)	Filip Smol (POL)	Benjamin Carlsen (NOR)
50m Rifle Prone TEAM	Switzerland	Norway	Croatia
50m Rifle 3 Positions	Filip Nepejchal (CZE)	István Péni (HUN)	Henrik Larsen (NOR)
50m Rifle 3 Positions TEAM	Hungary	Norway	Slovakia

== Women's events ==
Event	Gold	Silver	Bronze
25m Pistol	Michelle Skeries (GER)	Miroslava Mincheva (BUL)	Mathilde Lamolle (FRA)
25m Pistol TEAM	Czech Republic	Russia	France
50m Rifle Prone	Jenny Vatne (NOR)	Tina Lehrich (GER)	Emilie Wintenberger (FRA)
50m Rifle Prone TEAM	Germany	France	Finland
50m Rifle 3 Positions	Mandy Mulder (NED)	Jenny Vatne (NOR)	Anna-Lena Kinateder (GER)
50m Rifle 3 Positions TEAM	Norway	Germany	Russia
