= Viktória Egri =

Hungarian sport shooter

Personal information
- Nationality: Hungarian
- Born: 18 January 1998 (age 27)
- Height: 1.68 m (5 ft 6 in)
- Weight: 59 kg (130 lb)

Sport
- Country: Hungary
- Sport: Shooting

Viktória Egri (born 18 January 1998) is a Hungarian shooter. She represented her country at the 2016 Summer Olympics in the women's 10m air pistol event. She finished 36th out of 44 shooters.
