= Muskan =

Muskan is a given name, mostly feminine, found in Pakistan, India, Nepal, and Bangladesh. Notable people with this name include:

- Muskan Ahirwar (born 2006 or 2007), an Indian librarian
- Muskan Khatun (born 2004), a Nepalese human rights activist
- Muskan Kirar (born 2001), an Indian archer
- Muskan Khan (fl. 2022), an Indian Muslim woman in the 2022 Karnataka hijab row
- Muskan Malik (cricketer) (born 2002), an Indian cricket player
- Muskan Malik (kabaddi) (born 2000), an Indian kabaddi player
- Muskan Sumika (fl. 2015 – present), a Bangladeshi costume designer
