= 2026 ISSF Junior World Cup =

International shooting competition

- Sport: Shooting
- Defending champions: India (2025)
- Hosts: (Egypt) Cairo (Italy) Porpetto
- Duration: 19 April – 20 September

Seasons
- ← 2025 2027 →

The 2026 ISSF Junior World Cup is the annual edition of the ISSF Junior World Cup in the Olympic shooting events, governed by the International Shooting Sport Federation.

== Calendar ==
The calendar for the 2026 ISSF Junior World Cup is as follows:

Leg	Dates	Location	Type	Venue
1	19–27 April	(Egypt) Cairo	Rifle/Pistol/Shotgun	Erich-Krempel-Hall
2	12 September–20 September	(Italy) Porpetto	Rifle/Pistol/Shotgun	Dr. Karni Singh Shooting Range

== Participants ==
Participants for the 2025 ISSF Junior World Cup

Leg	Location	Nations	Athletes
1	Suhl	59	638
2	New Delhi	19	208

== Rifle events ==
=== Men's individual ===
10m Air Rifle
Stage	Venue	1st place, gold medalist(s)	2nd place, silver medalist(s)	3rd place, bronze medalist(s)
1	(Germany) Suhl	Huang Liwanlin (CHN)	Braden Wayne Peiser (USA)	Naraen Pranav (IND)
2	(India) New Delhi	Himanshu (IND)	Dmitrii Pimenov (AIN)	Abhinav Shaw (IND)

50m Rifle 3 Positions
Stage	Venue	1st place, gold medalist(s)	2nd place, silver medalist(s)	3rd place, bronze medalist(s)
1	(Germany) Suhl	Romain Aufrere (FRA)	Jens Oestli (NOR)	Adriyan Karmakar (IND)
2	(India) New Delhi	Dmitrii Pimenov (AIN)	Adriyan Karmakar (IND)	Kamil Nuriakhmetov (AIN)

50m Rifle Prone
Stage	Venue	1st place, gold medalist(s)	2nd place, silver medalist(s)	3rd place, bronze medalist(s)
1	(Germany) Suhl	Jesper Johansson (SWE)	Adriyan Karmakar (IND)	Griffin Lake (USA)
2	(India) New Delhi	Kamil Nuriakhmetov (AIN)	Deependra Singh Shekhawat (IND)	Rohit Kanyan (IND)

=== Women's individual ===
10m Air Rifle
Stage	Venue	1st place, gold medalist(s)	2nd place, silver medalist(s)	3rd place, bronze medalist(s)
1	(Germany) Suhl	Shambhavi Kshirsagar (IND)	Ojasvi Thakur (IND)	Carlotta Salafia (ITA)
2	(India) New Delhi	Ojasvi Thakur (IND)	Hrudya Kondur (IND)	Shambhavi Kshirsagar (IND)

50m Rifle 3 Positions
Stage	Venue	1st place, gold medalist(s)	2nd place, silver medalist(s)	3rd place, bronze medalist(s)
1	(Germany) Suhl	Vivien Joy Jaeggi (SUI)	Emely Jaeggi (SUI)	Xu Yingliu (CHN)
2	(India) New Delhi	Anushka Thokur (IND)	Anastasiia Sorokina (AIN)	Mariia Kruglova (AIN)

Rifle Prone
Stage	Venue	1st place, gold medalist(s)	2nd place, silver medalist(s)	3rd place, bronze medalist(s)
1	(Germany) Suhl	Caroline Finnestad Lund (NOR)	Klaudie Katz (CZE)	Wilhelmina Kalina Woskowiak (POL)
2	(India) New Delhi	Anushka Thokur (IND)	Anshika (IND)	Aadhya Agrawal (IND)

=== Mixed Team ===
10m Air Rifle
Stage	Venue	1st place, gold medalist(s)	2nd place, silver medalist(s)	3rd place, bronze medalist(s)
1	(Germany) Suhl	China; Huang Yuting; Huang Liwanlin	India; Khyaty Chaudhary; Naraen Pranav	India; Shambhavi Kshirsagar; Himanshu
2	(India) New Delhi	India; Isha Taksale; Himanshu	India; Shambhavi Kshrisagar; Naraen Pranav	Authorised Neutral Athletes; Varvara Kardakova; Kamil Nuriakhmetov

== Pistol events ==
=== Men's individual ===
10m Air Pistol
Stage	Venue	1st place, gold medalist(s)	2nd place, silver medalist(s)	3rd place, bronze medalist(s)
1	(Germany) Suhl	Ivan Semenikhin (AIN)	Imandos Bektenov (KGZ)	Yury Krautsou (AIN)
2	(India) New Delhi	Jonathan Antony (IND)	Luca Arrighi (ITA)	Lucas Sanchez Tome (ESP)

25m Rapid Fire Pistol
Stage	Venue	1st place, gold medalist(s)	2nd place, silver medalist(s)	3rd place, bronze medalist(s)
1	(Germany) Suhl	Thomas Clement (FRA)	Wiktor Lukasz (POL)	Mukesh Nelavalli (IND)
2	(India) New Delhi	Aleksandr Kovalev (AIN)	Mukesh Nelavalli (IND)	Suraj Sharma (IND)

=== Women's individual ===
10m Air Pistol
Stage	Venue	1st place, gold medalist(s)	2nd place, silver medalist(s)	3rd place, bronze medalist(s)
1	(Germany) Suhl	Kanak Budhwar (IND)	Anna Dulce (MLD)	Yen-Ching Cheng (TPE)
2	(India) New Delhi	–	Rashmika Sahgal (IND)	–

25m Rapid Fire Pistol
Stage	Venue	1st place, gold medalist(s)	2nd place, silver medalist(s)	3rd place, bronze medalist(s)
1	(Germany) Suhl	Tejaswani Singh (IND)	Alina Nestsiarovich (AIN)	Miriam Jako (HUN)
2	(India) New Delhi	–	Tejaswani Singh (IND)	–

=== Mixed team ===
10m Air Pistol
Stage	Venue	1st place, gold medalist(s)	2nd place, silver medalist(s)	3rd place, bronze medalist(s)
1	(Germany) Suhl	China; Jin Bohan; Zhang Yingtao	Ukraine; Yuliia Isachenko; Maksym Himon	Italy; Alessandra Fait; Francesco Rutigliani
2	(India) New Delhi	India; Rashmika Sahgal; Kapil Bainsla	India; Vanshika Chaudhary; Jonathan Antony	–

== Shotgun events ==
=== Men's individual ===
Trap
Stage	Venue	1st place, gold medalist(s)	2nd place, silver medalist(s)	3rd place, bronze medalist(s)
1	(Germany) Suhl	Fabrizio Fisichella (ITA)	Thomas William Betts (GBR)	Toni Gudelj (CRO)
2	(India) New Delhi	–	–	Vinay Chandrawat (IND)

Skeet
Stage	Venue	1st place, gold medalist(s)	2nd place, silver medalist(s)	3rd place, bronze medalist(s)
1	(Germany) Suhl	Lassi Kauppinen (FIN)	Matteo Bragalli (ITA)	Muhammet Seyhun Kaya (TUR)
2	(India) New Delhi	–	–	–

=== Women's individual ===
Trap
Stage	Venue	1st place, gold medalist(s)	2nd place, silver medalist(s)	3rd place, bronze medalist(s)
1	(Germany) Suhl	Kseniia Stepina (AIN)	Maria Teresa Giorgia Maccioni (ITA)	Martina Montani (ITA)
2	(India) New Delhi	–	–	–

Skeet
Stage	Venue	1st place, gold medalist(s)	2nd place, silver medalist(s)	3rd place, bronze medalist(s)
1	(Germany) Suhl	Pheobe Bodley-Scott (GBR)	Raiza Dhillon (IND)	Annabella Hettmer (GER)
2	(India) New Delhi	–	Raiza Dhillon (IND)	Mansi Raghuwanshi (IND)

=== Mixed team ===
Trap
Stage	Venue	1st place, gold medalist(s)	2nd place, silver medalist(s)	3rd place, bronze medalist(s)
1	(Germany) Suhl	Italy; Luca Gerri; Maria Teresa Giorgia Maccioni	France; Thomas Agez; Jeanne Auriche	Italy; Fabrizio Fisichella; Martina Montani
2	(India) New Delhi	–	–	–

== Medal table ==
Rank	Nation	Gold	Silver	Bronze	Total
1	India (IND)	9	14	12	35
2	Individual Neutral Athletes (AIN)	7	4	5	16
3	Italy (ITA)	4	4	5	13
4	China (CHN)	3	0	1	4
5	Czech Republic (CZE)	2	2	0	4
6	France (FRA)	2	1	0	3
7	Finland (FIN)	1	1	0	2
7	Great Britain (GBR)	1	1	0	2
7	Norway (NOR)	1	1	0	2
7	Switzerland (SUI)	1	1	0	2
11	Croatia (CRO)	1	0	1	2
11	Cyprus (CYP)	1	0	1	2
13	Sweden (SWE)	1	0	0	1
14	Spain (ESP)	0	1	3	4
15	Poland (POL)	0	1	1	2
16	Kyrgyzstan (KGZ)	0	1	0	1
16	Moldova (MLD)	0	1	0	1
16	Ukraine (UKR)	0	1	0	1
19	Chinese Taipei (TPE)	0	0	1	1
19	Germany (GER)	0	0	1	1
19	Hungary (HUN)	0	0	1	1
19	Iran (IRI)	0	0	1	1
19	Turkey (TUR)	0	0	1	1
19	United States (USA)	0	0	1	1
Totals (24 entries)		34	34	35	103
