= 2025 ISSF World Cup =

International shooting competition

- Sport: Shooting
- Hosts: (Argentina) Buenos Aires (Peru) Lima (Cyprus) Nicosia (Germany) Munich (Italy) Lonato (China) Ningbo (Qatar) Doha
- Duration: 1 April – 9 December

Seasons
- ← 2024 2026 →

The 2025 ISSF World Cup is the annual edition of the ISSF World Cup in the Olympic shooting events, governed by the International Shooting Sport Federation.

== Calendar ==
The calendar for the 2025 ISSF World Cup

Leg	Dates	Location	Type	Venue
1	1–11 April	(Argentina) Buenos Aires	Rifle/Pistol/Shotgun	Tiro Federal Argentino de Buenos Aires Shooting Range
2	13–22 April	(Peru) Lima	Rifle/Pistol/Shotgun	Las Palmas Shooting Range
3	3–12 May	(Cyprus) Nicosia	Shotgun	Cyprus Olympic Shooting Range “Lakis Psimolophitis”
4	7–15 June	(Germany) Munich	Rifle/Pistol	Olympiaschießanlage
5	4–14 July	(Italy) Lonato	Shotgun	Trap Concaverde
5	7–15 September	(China) Ningbo	Rifle/Pistol	Ningbo Olympic Sports Cente
Final	4–9 December	(Qatar) Doha	Rifle/Pistol/Shotgun	Lusail Shooting Range

== Rifle events ==
=== Men's individual ===
10m Air Rifle
Stage	Venue	1st place, gold medalist(s)	2nd place, silver medalist(s)	3rd place, bronze medalist(s)
1	(Argentina) Buenos Aires	Rudrankksh Patil (IND)	István Péni (HUN)	Marcelo Gutiérrez (ARG)
2	(Peru) Lima	Sheng Lihao (CHN)	Arjun Babuta (IND)	István Péni (HUN)
3	(Germany) Munich	Ilia Marsov (AIN)	Jon-Hermann Hegg (NOR)	Sheng Lihao (CHN)
4	(China) Ningbo	Danilo Sollazzo (ITA)	Sheng Lihao (CHN)	Park Ha-jun (KOR)
Final	(Qatar) Doha	Victor Lindgren (SWE)	Sheng Lihao (CHN)	István Péni (HUN)

50m Rifle 3 Positions
Stage	Venue	1st place, gold medalist(s)	2nd place, silver medalist(s)	3rd place, bronze medalist(s)
1	(Argentina) Buenos Aires	István Péni (HUN)	Tian Jiaming (CHN)	Chain Singh (IND)
2	(Peru) Lima	Jiří Přívratský (CZE)	Henrik Larsen (NOR)	István Péni (HUN)
3	(Germany) Munich	Jon-Hermann Hegg (NOR)	Ilia Marsov (AIN)	Jiří Přívratský (CZE)
4	(China) Ningbo	Jiří Přívratský (CZE)	Dmitrii Pimenov (AIN)	Jon-Hermann Hegg (NOR)
Final	(Qatar) Doha	Jiří Přívratský (CZE)	Aishwary Tomar (IND)	Liu Yukun (CHN)

=== Women's individual ===
10m Air Rifle
Stage	Venue	1st place, gold medalist(s)	2nd place, silver medalist(s)	3rd place, bronze medalist(s)
1	(Argentina) Buenos Aires	Wang Zifei (CHN)	Kwon Eun-ji (KOR)	Audrey Gogniat (SUI)
2	(Peru) Lima	Wang Zifei (CHN)	Han Jiayu (CHN)	Fan Xinyi (CHN)
3	(Germany) Munich	Wang Zifei (CHN)	Kwon Eun-ji (KOR)	Elavenil Valarivan (IND)
4	(China) Ningbo	Peng Xinlu (CHN)	Jeanette Hegg Duestad (NOR)	Meghana Sajjanar (IND)
Final	(Qatar) Doha	Wang Zifei (CHN)	Ban Hyo-jin (KOR)	Han Jiayu (CHN)

50m Rifle 3 Positions
Stage	Venue	1st place, gold medalist(s)	2nd place, silver medalist(s)	3rd place, bronze medalist(s)
1	(Argentina) Buenos Aires	Sift Kaur Samra (IND)	Anita Mangold (GER)	Arina Altukhova (KAZ)
2	(Peru) Lima	Sagen Maddalena (USA)	Jeanette Hegg Duestad (NOR)	Sara Karasova (CZE)
3	(Germany) Munich	Jeanette Hegg Duestad (NOR)	Emely Jaeggi (SUI)	Sift Kaur Samra (IND)
4	(China) Ningbo	Jeanette Hegg Duestad (NOR)	Rikke Ibsen (DEN)	Barbora Dubska (CZE)
Final	(Qatar) Doha	Jeanette Hegg Duestad (NOR)	Seonaid McIntosh (GBR)	Anna Janssen (GER)

=== Mixed Team ===
10m Air Rifle
Stage	Venue	1st place, gold medalist(s)	2nd place, silver medalist(s)	3rd place, bronze medalist(s)
1	(Argentina) Buenos Aires	China; Wang Zifei; Song Buhan	India; Arya Borse; Rudrankksh Patil	Argentina; Fernanda Russo; Marcelo Gutiérrez
2	(Peru) Lima	Norway; Jeanette Hegg Duestad; Jon-Hermann Hegg	India; Arya Borse; Rudrankksh Patil	China; Wang Zifei; Song Buhan
3	(Germany) Munich	India; Arya Borse; Arjun Babuta	China; Wang Zifei; Sheng Lihao	Norway; Jeanette Hegg Duestad; Jon-Hermann Hegg
4	(China) Ningbo	Norway; Jeanette Hegg Duestad; Jon-Hermann Hegg	China; Peng Xinlu; Sheng Lihao	Italy; Carlotta Salafia; Danilo Sollazzo

== Pistol events ==
=== Men's individual ===
10m Air Pistol
Stage	Venue	1st place, gold medalist(s)	2nd place, silver medalist(s)	3rd place, bronze medalist(s)
1	(Argentina) Buenos Aires	Hu Kai (CHN)	Anton Aristarkhov (AIN)	Jason Solari (SUI)
2	(Peru) Lima	Hu Kai (CHN)	Felipe Almeida Wu (BRA)	Saurabh Chaudhary (IND)
3	(Germany) Munich	Hu Kai (CHN)	Valeriy Rakhimzhan (KAZ)	Christian Reitz (GER)
4	(China) Ningbo	Hu Kai (CHN)	You Chengjie (CHN)	Jason Solari (SUI)
Final	(Qatar) Doha	Hu Kai (CHN)	Christian Reitz (GER)	Samrat Rana (IND)

25m Rapid Fire Pistol
Stage	Venue	1st place, gold medalist(s)	2nd place, silver medalist(s)	3rd place, bronze medalist(s)
1	(Argentina) Buenos Aires	Vijayveer Sidhu (IND)	Riccardo Mazzetti (ITA)	Yang Yuhao (CHN)
2	(Peru) Lima	Matej Rampula (CZE)	Su Lianbofan (CHN)	Christian Reitz (GER)
3	(Germany) Munich	Jean Quiquampoix (FRA)	Florian Peter (GER)	Emanuel Mueller (GER)
4	(China) Ningbo	Florian Peter (GER)	Jean Quiquampoix (FRA)	Clement Bessaguet (FRA)
Final	(Qatar) Doha	Li Yuehong (CHN)	Anish Bhanwala (IND)	Clement Bessaguet (FRA)

=== Women's individual ===
10m Air Pistol
Stage	Venue	1st place, gold medalist(s)	2nd place, silver medalist(s)	3rd place, bronze medalist(s)
1	(Argentina) Buenos Aires	Suruchi Singh (IND)	Qian Wei (CHN)	Jiang Ranxin (CHN)
2	(Peru) Lima	Suruchi Singh (IND)	Manu Bhaker (IND)	Yao Qianxun (CHN)
3	(Germany) Munich	Suruchi Singh (IND)	Camille Jedrzejewski (FRA)	Yao Qianxun (CHN)
4	(China) Ningbo	Esha Singh (IND)	Yao Qianxun (CHN)	Oh Yejin (KOR)
Final	(Qatar) Doha	Suruchi Singh (IND)	Sainyam (IND)	Yao Qianxun (CHN)

25m Pistol
Stage	Venue	1st place, gold medalist(s)	2nd place, silver medalist(s)	3rd place, bronze medalist(s)
1	(Argentina) Buenos Aires	Sun Yujie (CHN)	Esha Singh (IND)	Feng Sixuan (CHN)
2	(Peru) Lima	Sun Yujie (CHN)	Simranpreet Kaur Brar (IND)	Yao Qianxun (CHN)
3	(Germany) Munich	Sun Yujie (CHN)	Oh Yejin (KOR)	Yang Jiin (KOR)
4	(China) Ningbo	Yang Jiin (KOR)	Oh Yejin (KOR)	Xiao Jiaruixuan (CHN)
Final	(Qatar) Doha	Simranpreet Kaur Brar (IND)	Yao Qianxun (CHN)	Doreen Vennekamp (GER)

=== Mixed team ===
10m Air Pistol
Stage	Venue	1st place, gold medalist(s)	2nd place, silver medalist(s)	3rd place, bronze medalist(s)
1	(Argentina) Buenos Aires	China; Ma Qianke; Zhang Yifan	China; Yao Qianxun; Hu Kai	India; Suruchi Singh; Saurabh Chaudhary
2	(Peru) Lima	India; Suruchi Singh; Saurabh Chaudhary	China; Yao Qianxun; Hu Kai	China; Ma Qianke; Zhang Yifan
3	(Germany) Munich	China; Yao Qianxun; Hu Kai	Armenia; Elmira Karapetyan; Benik Khlghatyan	Germany; Doreen Vennekamp; Christian Reitz
4	(China) Ningbo	China; Yao Qianxun; Hu Kai	Czech Republic; Veronika Schejbalova; Jindrich Dubovy	Hungary; Veronika Major; Akos Nagy

== Shotgun events ==
=== Men's individual ===
Trap
Stage	Venue	1st place, gold medalist(s)	2nd place, silver medalist(s)	3rd place, bronze medalist(s)
1	(Argentina) Buenos Aires	Jean Pierre Brol (GUA)	Glenn Eller (USA)	William Hinton (USA)
2	(Peru) Lima	William Hinton (USA)	Mauro De Filippis (ITA)	Giovanni Cernogoraz (CRO)
3	(Cyprus) Nicosia	Manuel Murcia (ESP)	Yannick Peeters (BEL)	Aaron Heading (GBR)
4	(Italy) Lonato	Giovanni Pellielo (ITA)	Matthew Coward-Holley (GBR)	Mauro De Filippis (ITA)
Final	(Qatar) Doha	William Hinton (USA)	Jean Pierre Brol (GUA)	Glenn Eller (USA)

Skeet
Stage	Venue	1st place, gold medalist(s)	2nd place, silver medalist(s)	3rd place, bronze medalist(s)
1	(Argentina) Buenos Aires	Christian Elliott (USA)	Gabriele Rossetti (ITA)	Elia Sdruccioli (ITA)
2	(Peru) Lima	Dustan Taylor (USA)	Christian Elliott (USA)	Han Xu (CHN)
3	(Cyprus) Nicosia	Elia Sdruccioli (ITA)	Jesper Hansen (DEN)	Charalambos Chalkiadakis (GRE)
4	(Italy) Lonato	Vincent Hancock (USA)	Henrik Jansson (SWE)	Daniel Korcak (CZE)
Final	(Qatar) Doha	Christian Elliott (USA)	Vincent Hancock (USA)	Dustan Taylor (USA)

=== Women's individual ===
Trap
Stage	Venue	1st place, gold medalist(s)	2nd place, silver medalist(s)	3rd place, bronze medalist(s)
1	(Argentina) Buenos Aires	Penny Smith (AUS)	Carey Jeana Garrison (USA)	Liu Wan-yu (TPE)
2	(Peru) Lima	Silvana Stanco (ITA)	Mar Molne Magrina (ESP)	Adriana Ruano (GUA)
3	(Cyprus) Nicosia	Lada Denisova (AIN)	Carey Jeana Garrison (USA)	Alessandra Perilli (SMR)
4	(Italy) Lonato	Laetisha Scanlan (AUS)	Silvana Stanco (ITA)	Lada Denisova (AIN)
Final	(Qatar) Doha	Silvana Stanco (ITA)	Alessandra Perilli (SMR)	Rümeysa Pelin Kaya (TUR)

Skeet
Stage	Venue	1st place, gold medalist(s)	2nd place, silver medalist(s)	3rd place, bronze medalist(s)
1	(Argentina) Buenos Aires	Dania Jo Vizzi (USA)	Kimberly Rhode (USA)	Arina Kuznetsova (AIN)
2	(Peru) Lima	Kimberly Rhode (USA)	Samantha Simonton (USA)	Dania Jo Vizzi (USA)
3	(Cyprus) Nicosia	Arina Kuznetsova (AIN)	Samantha Simonton (USA)	Che Yufei (CHN)
4	(Italy) Lonato	Samantha Simonton (USA)	Dania Jo Vizzi (USA)	Jiang Yiting (CHN)
Final	(Qatar) Doha	Jiang Yiting (CHN)	Samantha Simonton (USA)	Emmanouela Katzouraki (GRE)

=== Mixed team ===
Trap
Stage	Venue	1st place, gold medalist(s)	2nd place, silver medalist(s)	3rd place, bronze medalist(s)
1	(Argentina) Buenos Aires	Chinese Taipei; Yang Kun-pi; Liu Wan-yu	Australia; Mitchell Iles; Penny Smith	Italy; Diego Valeri; Erica Sessa
2	(Peru) Lima	Australia; Mitchell Iles; Penny Smith	Guatemala; Jean Pierre Brol; Adriana Ruano	Italy; Mauro De Filippis; Silvana Stanco
3	(Cyprus) Nicosia	China; Qi Ying; Zhang Zixi	Poland; Tomasz Pasierbski; Sandra Bernal	India; Kynan Chenai; Sabeera Haris
4	(Italy) Lonato	Australia; Mitchell Iles; Laetisha Scanlan	Spain; Alberto Fernandez; Fatima Galvez	United Kingdom; Matthew Coward-Holley; Ellie Seward

== Medal table ==
Rank	Nation	Gold	Silver	Bronze	Total
1	China (CHN)	21	13	17	51
2	India (IND)	11	9	8	28
3	United States (USA)	10	10	5	25
4	Norway (NOR)	6	4	2	12
5	Italy (ITA)	5	4	4	13
6	Czech Republic (CZE)	4	1	4	9
7	Australia (AUS)	4	1	0	5
–	Individual Neutral Athletes (AIN)	3	3	2	8
8	South Korea (KOR)	1	5	3	9
9	Germany (GER)	1	3	6	10
10	France (FRA)	1	2	2	5
11	Guatemala (GUA)	1	2	1	4
12	Spain (ESP)	1	2	0	3
13	Hungary (HUN)	1	1	4	6
14	Sweden (SWE)	1	1	0	2
15	Chinese Taipei (TPE)	1	0	1	2
16	Great Britain (GBR)	0	2	2	4
17	Denmark (DEN)	0	2	0	2
18	Switzerland (SUI)	0	1	3	4
19	Kazakhstan (KAZ)	0	1	1	2
19	San Marino (SMR)	0	1	1	2
21	Armenia (ARM)	0	1	0	1
21	Belgium (BEL)	0	1	0	1
21	Brazil (BRA)	0	1	0	1
21	Poland (POL)	0	1	0	1
25	Argentina (ARG)	0	0	2	2
25	Greece (GRE)	0	0	2	2
27	Croatia (CRO)	0	0	1	1
27	Turkey (TUR)	0	0	1	1
Totals (28 entries)		72	72	72	216
