= Shooting at the 2026 Asian Games – Women's 10 metre air pistol =

Women's 10 metre air pistol at the 2026 Asian Games
- Venue: Aichi Pref. General Shooting Gallery
- Dates: 23 September 2026
- Competitors: 59 from 26 nations

Medalists
gold medal	Choo Ga-eun	South Korea
silver medal	Shen Yiyao	China
bronze medal	Jiang Ranxin	China

The women's 10 metre air pistol competition at the 2026 Asian Games in Aichi Prefecture, Japan was held on 23 September 2026 at Aichi Pref. General Shooting Gallery.

== Schedule ==
All times are Japan Standard Time (UTC+09:00)

Date	Time	Event
Wednesday, 23 September 2026	09:45	Qualification
Wednesday, 23 September 2026	12:30	Final

== Records ==
Prior to this competition, the existing world, Asian and Games records were as follows.

Qualification
World Record	Jiang Ranxin (CHN)	591	Cairo, Egypt	15 October 2022
Asian Record	Kim Bo-mi (KOR)	588	Daegu, South Korea	16 November 2022
Games Record	Jiang Ranxin (CHN) / Zhao Nan (CHN)	581	Hangzhou, China	29 September 2023
Final
World Record	Zorana Arunović (SRB)	246.9	Maribor, Slovenia	11 March 2017
Asian Record	Yukari Konishi (JPN)	245.3	Wako, Japan	10 December 2017
Games Record	Palak Gulia (IND)	242.1	Hangzhou, China	29 September 2023

== Results ==
Legend

- DNS — Did not start

=== Qualification ===
Rank	Athlete	Series						Total	Xs	Notes
Rank	Athlete	1	2	3	4	5	6	Total	Xs	Notes
1	Choo Ga-eun (KOR)	97	98	98	95	97	97	582	19	GR
2	Jiang Ranxin (CHN)	98	98	97	95	98	94	580	22	
3	Manu Bhaker (IND)	95	96	98	96	96	98	579	20	
4	Shen Yiyao (CHN)	96	96	99	96	96	96	579	17	
5	Nguyễn Thùy Trang (VIE)	95	97	97	96	94	98	577	15	
6	Yasi Samieh (IRI)	98	97	95	97	92	97	576	19	
7	Yao Qianxun (CHN)	97	93	97	94	98	97	576	17	
8	Popelova Valeriya (KAZ)	96	95	95	94	99	96	575	19	
9	Cheng Yen-Ching (TPE)	97	95	95	97	97	94	575	18	
10	Kim Bo-mi (KOR)	95	96	97	96	94	96	574	22	
11	Trịnh Thu Vinh (VIE)	96	95	94	97	97	95	574	19	
12	Oh Ye-jin (KOR)	96	95	97	95	94	97	574	14	
13	Shing Ho Ching (HKG)	98	95	95	94	96	94	572	16	
14	Arista Perdana Putri Darmoyo (INA)	97	94	93	98	96	94	572	14	
15	Esha Singh (IND)	94	93	95	97	97	96	572	12	
16	Nakagawa Karon (JPN)	96	94	98	95	95	94	572	12	
17	Yu Ai-wen (TPE)	97	93	99	97	94	92	572	12	
18	Haniyeh Rostamian (IRI)	94	96	93	97	97	94	571	21	
19	Wu Chia-ying (TPE)	94	97	93	93	97	97	571	9	
20	Nigina Saidkulova (UZB)	97	94	93	97	93	96	570	21	
21	Kim Hyon Suk (PRK)	97	93	96	94	95	95	570	16	
22	Kabir Rabia (PAK)	94	96	95	95	95	94	569	18	
23	Nurul Syasya Nadiah Binti Mohd Arifin (MAS)	99	93	96	94	92	95	569	16	
24	Pak Hyon Gyong (PRK)	94	94	95	95	94	96	568	14	
25	Bui Thuy Thu Thuy (VIE)	98	95	94	93	94	94	568	12	
26	Suruchi Inder Singh (IND)	94	94	97	94	96	93	568	12	
27	Zeynab Toumari Alilehsar (IRI)	96	92	97	96	95	92	568	10	
28	Kamonlak Saencha (THA)	94	96	92	94	95	96	567	16	
29	Rihadatul Asyifa (INA)	93	95	95	92	96	96	567	14	
30	Teh Xiu Hong (SGP)	96	93	94	96	93	95	567	14	
31	Chizuru Sasaki (JPN)	96	96	94	93	94	94	567	13	
32	Aizawa Hikaru (JPN)	94	93	96	96	96	92	567	10	
33	Teh Xiu Yi (SGP)	90	97	94	94	95	96	566	6	
34	Makhmadova Bakhtigul (KGZ)	96	93	94	95	92	95	565	14	
35	Tumurchudur Bayartsetseg (MGL)	95	93	97	92	91	96	564	12	
36	Anjila Amjad (BAN)	94	96	97	91	93	91	562	17	
37	Ariunzaya Amarbaysgalan (MGL)	93	94	91	94	94	96	562	13	
38	Ri Su Rim (PRK)	95	93	92	96	91	94	561	11	
39	Duaa Rahmatalla M Habib (QAT)	93	93	91	92	97	94	560	12	
40	Derli Amalia Putri (INA)	91	92	95	93	91	97	559	7	
41	Eshal Misbah (MDV)	94	93	89	91	96	95	558	12	
42	Surassawadee Bubphachat (THA)	94	91	91	95	94	92	557	8	
43	Nina Starova (KAZ)	93	95	90	96	93	90	557	8	
44	Franchette Shayne Quiroz (PHI)	93	92	94	93	94	89	555	10	
45	Ghaya Shuhail Abdalla Alshuhail (UAE)	91	91	93	95	95	90	555	9	
46	Natsara Champalat (THA)	92	91	93	88	92	95	551	9	
47	Shirinbibi Rajabova (TJK)	94	91	92	92	92	89	550	6	
48	Saule Alimbek (KAZ)	90	92	90	95	90	92	549	9	
49	Yasameen Al-Raimi (YEM)	91	93	91	90	90	93	548	6	
50	Buyandelger Altankhuyag (MGL)	88	88	93	95	93	90	547	10	
51	Ahlam Al-Naggar (YEM)	92	91	86	90	91	97	547	4	
52	Mahra Alsuwaidi (UAE)	90	94	88	93	89	90	544	2	
53	Anastasiya A. Lysykh (TJK)	87	87	91	89	88	90	532	5	
54	Mariyam Malak Mohamed Muslih (MDV)	87	89	89	90	78	83	516	4	
55	Fathimath Faiha (MDV)	84	90	81	86	88	81	510	7	
—	Aisha Abdulla M F Al-Abdulla (QAT)							DNS		
—	Reem Alketbi (UAE)							DNS		
—	Salma Abbas F Almass (QAT)							DNS		
—	Kishmala Talat (PAK)							DNS		

=== Final ===
Rank	Athlete	1st stage		2nd stage – Elimination							S-off	Notes
Rank	Athlete	1	2	1	2	3	4	5	6	7	S-off	Notes
1st place, gold medalist(s)	Choo Ga-eun (KOR)	51.8	101.6	122.4	143.9	164.1	184.5	205.4	225.9	246.3		GR
2nd place, silver medalist(s)	Shen Yiyao (CHN)	51.1	101.1	122.0	142.5	162.2	181.9	202.1	221.8	241.3		
3rd place, bronze medalist(s)	Jiang Ranxin (CHN)	49.3	101.1	121.1	141.5	161.6	182.0	201.7				
4	Cheng Yen-Ching (TPE)	49.8	101.3	121.2	141.2	161.8	181.9					
5	Manu Bhaker (IND)	50.8	100.3	120.4	140.4	160.7						
6	Nguyễn Thùy Trang (VIE)	50.2	99.8	119.7	140.2							
7	Popelova Valeriya (KAZ)	49.9	100.3	119.7								
8	Yasi Samieh (IRI)	47.8	95.2	115.5								
