= 2017 ISSF Junior World Cup =

The 2017 ISSF Junior World Cup is the annual edition of the ISSF Junior World Cup, governed by the International Shooting Sport Federation

== Men's results ==
=== Shotgun Events ===
==== Individual Results ====
| Trap | | | Double trap | | | Skeet | | |
| Porpetto Italy (15-22 Aug) | | | Porpetto Italy (15-22 Aug) | | | Porpetto Italy (15-22 Aug) | | |
|---|---|---|---|---|---|---|---|---|
| 1st place, gold medalist(s) | Adria Martinez Torres (ESP) | 46 WRJ | 1st place, gold medalist(s) | James Dedman (GBR) | 70 WRJ | 1st place, gold medalist(s) | Elia Sdruccioli (ITA) | 57 WRJ |
| 2nd place, silver medalist(s) | Matteo Marongiu (ITA) | 43 | 2nd place, silver medalist(s) | Miki Ylonem (FIN) | 66 | 2nd place, silver medalist(s) | Christian Elliott (USA) | 55 |
| 3rd place, bronze medalist(s) | Murat Ilbilgi (TUR) | 36 | 3rd place, bronze medalist(s) | Shapath Bharadwaj (IND) | 48 | 3rd place, bronze medalist(s) | Matteo Chiti (ITA) | 44 |

== Women's Results ==
=== Shotgun Events ===
==== Individual Results ====
| Trap | | | Skeet | | |
| Porpetto Italy (15-22 Aug) | | | Porpetto Italy (15-22 Aug) | | |
|---|---|---|---|---|---|
| 1st place, gold medalist(s) | Erica Sessa (ITA) | 40 | 1st place, gold medalist(s) | Katharina Monika Jacob (USA) | 47 WRJ |
| 2nd place, silver medalist(s) | Maria Lucia Palmitessa (ITA) | 37 | 2nd place, silver medalist(s) | Yufei Che (CHN) | 44 |
| 3rd place, bronze medalist(s) | Giulia Grassia (ITA) | 28 | 3rd place, bronze medalist(s) | Lea Richard (FRA) | 37 |

== Medal table ==
| Rank | Country | Gold | Silver | Bronze | Total |
|---|---|---|---|---|---|
| 1 | Italy | 2 | 2 | 2 | 6 |
| 2 | United States | 1 | 1 | 0 | 2 |
| 3 | Spain | 1 | 0 | 0 | 1 |
| 3 | United Kingdom | 1 | 0 | 0 | 1 |
| 5 | China | 0 | 1 | 0 | 1 |
| 5 | Finland | 0 | 1 | 0 | 1 |
| 7 | France | 0 | 0 | 1 | 1 |
| 7 | India | 0 | 0 | 1 | 1 |
| 7 | Turkey | 0 | 0 | 1 | 1 |
| Total | 9 | 5 | 5 | 5 | 15 |
