= Shooting at the 2026 Asian Games – Mixed 10 metre air pistol team =

Mixed 10 metre air pistol team at the 2026 Asian Games
- Venue: Aichi Pref. General Shooting Gallery
- Dates: 25 September 2026
- Competitors: 42 from 21 nations

Medalists
| gold medal | Suruchi Inder Singh; Kamaljeet Sahlot | India |
| silver medal | Choo Ga-eun; Hong Su-hyeon | South Korea |
| bronze medal | Hanieh Rostamian; Vahid Golkhandan | Iran |

The mixed 10 metre air pistol team competition at the 2026 Asian Games in Aichi Prefecture, Japan was held on 25 September 2026 at Aichi Pref. General Shooting Gallery.

== Schedule ==
All times are Japan Standard Time (UTC+09:00)

| Date | Time | Event |
|---|---|---|
| Friday, 25 September 2026 | 09:45 | Qualification |
| Friday, 25 September 2026 | 12:00 | Final |

== Records ==
Prior to this competition, the existing world, Asian and Games records were as follows.

| World Record | China | 591 | Hangzhou, China | 22 July 2026 |
| Asian Record | India | 587 | Osijek, Croatia | 26 June 2021 |
| Games Record | India | 577 | Hangzhou, China | 30 September 2023 |

== Results ==
Legend

- DNS — Did not start

=== Qualification ===
| Rank | Team | Series | | | Total | Xs | Notes |
| Rank | Team | 1 | 2 | 3 | Total | Xs | Notes |
|---|---|---|---|---|---|---|---|
| 1 | India (IND) | 196 | 195 | 196 | 587 | 29 | GR Q |
| | Suruchi Inder Singh | 99 | 97 | 100 | 296 | 15 | |
| | Kamaljeet Sahlot | 97 | 98 | 96 | 291 | 14 | |
| 2 | Iran (IRI) | 191 | 198 | 195 | 584 | 17 | Q |
| | Hanieh Rostamian | 94 | 99 | 96 | 289 | 9 | |
| | Vahid Golkhandan | 97 | 99 | 99 | 295 | 8 | |
| 3 | South Korea (KOR) | 195 | 194 | 193 | 582 | 23 | Q |
| | Choo Ga-eun | 100 | 97 | 97 | 294 | 9 | |
| | Hong Su-hyeon | 95 | 97 | 96 | 288 | 14 | |
| 4 | Indonesia (INA) | 192 | 194 | 194 | 580 | 30 | Q |
| | Arista Perdana Putri Darmoyo | 94 | 94 | 97 | 285 | 10 | |
| | Muhamad Iqbal Raia Prabowo | 98 | 100 | 97 | 295 | 20 | |
| 5 | North Korea (PRK) | 194 | 191 | 193 | 578 | 24 | |
| | Kim Hyon Suk | 98 | 96 | 96 | 290 | 11 | |
| | Kim Song-guk | 96 | 95 | 97 | 288 | 13 | |
| 6 | Vietnam (VIE) | 192 | 196 | 190 | 578 | 15 | |
| | Trịnh Thu Vinh | 96 | 99 | 95 | 290 | 11 | |
| | Phạm Quang Huy | 96 | 97 | 95 | 288 | 4 | |
| 7 | China (CHN) | 195 | 190 | 192 | 577 | 14 | |
| | Shen Yiyao | 98 | 96 | 94 | 288 | 5 | |
| | Bu Shuaihang | 97 | 94 | 98 | 289 | 9 | |
| 8 | Malaysia (MAS) | 193 | 195 | 188 | 576 | 20 | |
| | Nurul Syasya Nadiah Binti Mohd Arifin | 97 | 99 | 94 | 290 | 10 | |
| | Wong Guanjie Johnathan | 96 | 96 | 94 | 286 | 10 | |
| 9 | Mongolia (MGL) | 196 | 189 | 191 | 576 | 15 | |
| | Tömörchödöriin Bayartsetseg | 98 | 96 | 93 | 287 | 8 | |
| | Enkhtaivany Davaakhüü | 98 | 93 | 98 | 289 | 7 | |
| 10 | Uzbekistan (UZB) | 193 | 190 | 192 | 575 | 18 | |
| | Nigina Saidkulova | 95 | 94 | 96 | 285 | 6 | |
| | Mukhammad Kamalov | 98 | 96 | 96 | 290 | 12 | |
| 11 | Chinese Taipei (TPE) | 189 | 194 | 189 | 572 | 16 | |
| | Cheng Yen-Ching | 94 | 98 | 94 | 286 | 7 | |
| | Hsieh Hsiang-Chen | 95 | 96 | 95 | 286 | 9 | |
| 12 | Japan (JPN) | 190 | 192 | 187 | 569 | 20 | |
| | Aizawa Hikaru | 95 | 96 | 92 | 283 | 8 | |
| | Seiji Morikawa | 95 | 96 | 95 | 286 | 12 | |
| 13 | Kazakhstan (KAZ) | 190 | 192 | 187 | 569 | 16 | |
| | Valeriya Popelova | 94 | 95 | 90 | 279 | 8 | |
| | Valeriy Rakhimzhan | 96 | 97 | 97 | 290 | 8 | |
| 14 | Thailand (THA) | 188 | 192 | 184 | 564 | 10 | |
| | Surassawadee Bubphachat | 92 | 97 | 89 | 278 | 4 | |
| | Kiettikul Sudkhet | 96 | 95 | 95 | 286 | 6 | |
| 15 | Qatar (QAT) | 187 | 184 | 192 | 563 | 12 | |
| | Duaa Rahmatalla M Habib | 94 | 94 | 96 | 284 | 9 | |
| | Khalid Abdulnasser A A Al-Shaiba | 93 | 90 | 96 | 279 | 3 | |
| 16 | Kyrgyzstan (KGZ) | 188 | 186 | 187 | 561 | 10 | |
| | Bakhtigul Makhmadova | 93 | 93 | 91 | 277 | 5 | |
| | Ruslan Rodionov | 95 | 93 | 96 | 284 | 5 | |
| 17 | Philippines (PHI) | 187 | 188 | 186 | 561 | 8 | |
| | Franchette Shayne Quiroz | 93 | 94 | 93 | 280 | 4 | |
| | Michael Angelo Fernandez | 94 | 94 | 93 | 281 | 4 | |
| 18 | United Arab Emirates (UAE) | 192 | 184 | 184 | 560 | 9 | |
| | Ghaya Shuhail Abdalla Alshuhail | 96 | 91 | 89 | 276 | 3 | |
| | Mohamad Saleh | 96 | 93 | 95 | 284 | 6 | |
| 19 | Bangladesh (BAN) | 185 | 186 | 187 | 558 | 15 | |
| | Anjila Amjad | 94 | 95 | 92 | 281 | 7 | |
| | Saker Ahmed | 91 | 91 | 95 | 277 | 8 | |
| 20 | Maldives (MDV) | 187 | 183 | 187 | 557 | 14 | |
| | Eshal Misbah | 95 | 91 | 93 | 279 | 8 | |
| | Ziyan Ziyau | 92 | 92 | 94 | 278 | 6 | |
| 21 | Tajikistan (TJK) | 189 | 181 | 186 | 556 | 17 | |
| | Shirinbibi Rajabova | 95 | 89 | 90 | 274 | 9 | |
| | David Oripov | 94 | 92 | 96 | 282 | 8 | |

=== Final ===
| Rank | Team / Athlete | 1st Comp. Stage | | | 2nd Comp. Stage – Elimination | | Final Total | Notes |
| Rank | Team / Athlete | 1 | 2 | 3 | 4 | 5 | Final Total | Notes |
|---|---|---|---|---|---|---|---|---|
| 1st place, gold medalist(s) | India (IND) | 103.0 | 202.4 | 303.5 | 364.7 | 424.9 | 484.6 | GR |
| 1st place, gold medalist(s) | Suruchi Inder Singh | 52.3 | 50.0 | 51.2 | 30.8 | 31.0 | 245.7 | |
| 1st place, gold medalist(s) | Kamaljeet Sahlot | 50.7 | 49.4 | 49.9 | 30.4 | 29.2 | 238.9 | |
| 2nd place, silver medalist(s) | South Korea (KOR) | 98.1 | 201.2 | 300.2 | 358.9 | 416.5 | 478.0 | |
| 2nd place, silver medalist(s) | Choo Ga-eun | 49.0 | 51.8 | 51.2 | 28.1 | 29.8 | 240.2 | |
| 2nd place, silver medalist(s) | Hong Su-hyeon | 49.1 | 51.3 | 47.8 | 30.6 | 27.8 | 237.8 | |
| 3rd place, bronze medalist(s) | Iran (IRI) | 98.0 | 196.9 | 295.0 | 355.8 | | 415.8 | |
| 3rd place, bronze medalist(s) | Hanieh Rostamian | 47.4 | 46.8 | 49.6 | 30.3 | | 204.3 | |
| 3rd place, bronze medalist(s) | Vahid Golkhandan | 50.6 | 52.1 | 48.5 | 30.5 | | 211.5 | |
| 4 | Indonesia (INA) | 95.2 | 196.0 | 291.0 | | | 349.4 | |
| 4 | Arista Perdana Putri Darmoyo | 46.9 | 50.4 | 46.9 | | | 172.5 | |
| 4 | Muhamad Iqbal Raia Prabowo | 48.3 | 50.4 | 48.1 | | | 176.9 | |
