= Galoon =

- Village
- Location within Himachal Pradesh Location within India
- Coordinates: 31.227°N 77.595°E
- Country: India
- State: Himachal Pradesh
- District: Shimla
- Tehsil: Rohru
- Elevation: 2,377 m (7,799 ft)

Population (2011)
  - Total: 298

Languages
  - Official: Hindi
  - Regional: Mahasu Pahari (Kochi)
- Time zone: UTC+5:30 (IST)
- Postal code: 171203

Galoon is a village in Gram Panchayat Kadiwan of Rohru tehsil of Shimla district in the Indian state of Himachal Pradesh. It is approximately 48 km from Rohru and 102 km from district headquarters Shimla.
