= Shooting at the 2026 Asian Games – Men's 10 metre air pistol =

Men's 10 metre air pistol at the 2026 Asian Games
- Venue: Aichi Pref. General Shooting Gallery
- Dates: 24 September 2026
- Competitors: 60 from 24 nations

Medalists
gold medal	Vladimir Svechnikov	Uzbekistan
silver medal	Hu Kai	China
bronze medal	Bu Shuaihang	China

The men's 10 metre air pistol competition at the 2026 Asian Games in Aichi Prefecture, Japan was held on 24 September 2026 at Aichi Pref. General Shooting Gallery.

== Schedule ==
All times are Japan Standard Time (UTC+09:00)

Date	Time	Event
Thursday, 24 September 2026	09:45	Qualification
Thursday, 24 September 2026	15:45	Final

== Records ==
Prior to this competition, the existing world, Asian and Games records were as follows.

Qualification
World Record	Jin Jongoh (KOR)	594	Changwon, South Korea	12 April 2009
Asian Record	Jin Jongoh (KOR)	594	Changwon, South Korea	12 April 2009
Games Record	Tan Zongliang (CHN)	590	Busan, South Korea	3 March 2002
Final
World Record	Kim Song Guk (PRK)	246.5	Doha, Qatar	11 November 2019
Asian Record	Kim Song Guk (PRK)	246.5	Doha, Qatar	11 November 2019
Games Record	Saurabh Chaudhary (IND)	240.7	Palembang, Indonesia	21 August 2018

== Results ==
Legend

- Q — Qualified for the final

=== Qualification ===
Rank	Athlete	Qualification						Total	Xs	Notes
Rank	Athlete	1	2	3	4	5	6	Total	Xs	Notes
1	Muhamad Iqbal Raia Prabowo (INA)	99	96	99	100	99	96	589	21	Q
2	Bu Shuaihang (CHN)	96	99	98	97	95	98	583	21	Q
3	Sulthanul Aulia Maruf (INA)	99	96	98	95	97	98	583	16	Q
4	Valeriy Rakhimzhan (KAZ)	95	95	98	98	98	98	582	25	Q
5	Hu Kai (CHN)	97	98	97	97	96	97	582	23	Q
6	Vladimir Svechnikov (UZB)	97	95	97	99	96	98	582	21	Q
7	Lai Cong Minh (VIE)	96	99	93	98	99	96	581	20	Q
8	Hong Suhyeon (KOR)	97	95	98	99	96	96	581	16	Q
9	Kamaljeet Sahlot (IND)	97	98	100	94	93	98	580	18	
10	Vahid Golkhandan (IRI)	97	99	96	99	96	93	580	16	
11	Aakash Bharadwaj (IND)	97	95	98	94	97	98	579	20	
12	Xie Yu (CHN)	96	99	95	97	94	97	578	26	
13	Masaki Iwasa (JPN)	97	96	96	96	97	95	577	21	
14	Junnosuke Nakayama (JPN)	97	93	97	95	97	98	577	14	
15	Seiji Morikawa (JPN)	95	97	99	92	98	95	576	19	
16	Davaakhuu Enkhtaivan (MGL)	93	95	98	96	99	95	576	18	
17	Rim Ryu Song (PRK)	97	93	97	95	99	94	575	21	
18	Sodikjon Abdullaev (UZB)	95	95	95	96	97	97	575	13	
19	Hsieh Hsiang-Chen (TPE)	95	96	95	97	96	96	575	8	
20	Kim Song-guk (PRK)	96	97	97	94	96	94	574	19	
21	Ho Se Rim (PRK)	95	94	97	94	98	95	573	20	
22	So Seung Seob (KOR)	94	98	97	96	96	91	572	20	
23	Wong Guanjie Johnathan (MAS)	95	96	94	96	97	94	572	18	
24	Ruslan Rodionov (KGZ)	94	96	95	96	95	96	572	15	
25	Wira Sukmana (INA)	97	93	94	96	98	93	571	20	
26	Nguyen Dinh Thanh (VIE)	93	94	93	98	96	97	571	13	
27	Kiettikul Sudkhet (THA)	94	95	96	94	95	97	571	12	
28	Pham Quang Huy (VIE)	94	93	95	97	95	96	570	17	
29	Atallah Nidaa K Alanazi (KSA)	93	94	94	96	96	97	570	16	
30	Mukhammad Kamalov (UZB)	94	93	97	94	97	95	570	16	
31	Carlo Deniel Valdez (PHI)	92	96	96	94	96	96	570	15	
32	Yeh Ting-Wei (TPE)	95	95	95	92	97	95	569	16	
33	Kirill Fedkin (KAZ)	94	97	95	95	94	94	569	15	
34	Javad Foroughi (IRI)	94	92	93	97	94	98	568	17	
35	Kedarling Balakrishna Uchaganve (IND)	97	96	92	95	96	92	568	15	
36	Michael Angelo Fernandez (PHI)	95	90	96	94	97	96	568	13	
37	Mohammadrasoul Efati (IRI)	95	95	94	95	95	94	568	6	
38	Pongpol Kulchairattana (THA)	94	93	96	93	97	93	566	13	
39	Ahmed Abdalla Ibrahim Abdalla Alameeri (UAE)	91	96	96	96	97	90	566	12	
40	Fahad Faris O Almutairi (KSA)	93	92	94	97	92	97	565	14	
41	Safar Mohammed S Aldosari (KSA)	96	94	92	92	95	96	565	11	
42	Salim O Al Hinai (OMA)	95	95	92	95	93	95	565	10	
43	Mehron Khojaev (TJK)	93	95	94	96	93	93	564	13	
44	Kim Tae Young (KOR)	94	95	90	93	94	97	563	15	
45	Buyanzaya Shirgal (MGL)	93	94	93	94	94	95	563	10	
46	Noor Alif (BAN)	95	89	94	95	95	94	562	11	
47	Badamgarav Enkhtaivan (MGL)	94	93	95	92	95	92	561	9	
48	Mohamad Saleh (UAE)	92	91	94	95	93	94	559	10	
49	Ziyan Ziyau (MDV)	95	93	89	93	95	94	559	8	
50	Nasser Salem H R Al-Senaid (QAT)	92	93	89	95	94	95	558	11	
51	Saker Ahmed (BAN)	98	93	89	95	91	92	558	7	
52	Khalid Abdulnasser A A Al-Shaiba (QAT)	92	92	94	94	92	93	557	16	
53	Askat Tokmokov (KGZ)	93	95	96	91	91	91	557	15	
54	David Oripov (TJK)	93	94	89	94	93	93	556	20	
55	Mohammed Nasser A A Alyafei (QAT)	93	93	93	91	92	93	555	9	
56	Maadh Mohamed Thoha (MDV)	92	92	92	92	93	93	554	8	
57	Eldar Imankulov (KAZ)	92	90	95	91	95	91	554	7	
58	Timothy John Poblete (PHI)	91	94	92	92	95	89	553	4	
59	Fadi Hamdan (SYR)	89	89	89	93	92	97	549	5	
60	Mohamed Subhaath Hamid Shafeeg (MDV)	84	95	92	89	88	91	539	10	

=== Final ===
Rank	Athlete	1st stage		2nd stage – Elimination							S-off	Notes
Rank	Athlete	1	2	1	2	3	4	5	6	7	S-off	Notes
1st place, gold medalist(s)	Vladimir Svechnikov (UZB)	50.7	101.3	120.9	141.5	162.5	181.5	202.3	223.2	244.3		GR
2nd place, silver medalist(s)	Hu Kai (CHN)	50.3	101.1	120.2	140.4	160.0	181.3	202.4	222.4	243.0		
3rd place, bronze medalist(s)	Bu Shuaihang (CHN)	51.2	102.5	123.2	141.9	162.5	180.6	201.3	222.1			
4	Hong Suhyeon (KOR)	49.2	98.8	118.7	138.8	159.3	178.7	198.4				
5	Valeriy Rakhimzhan (KAZ)	50.0	101.9	121.9	140.3	159.3	177.6					
6	Sulthanul Aulia Maruf (INA)	48.9	100.1	120.5	139.4	157.8						
7	Muhamad Iqbal Raia Prabowo (INA)	49.5	99.4	118.7	138.5							
8	Lai Cong Minh (VIE)	46.2	95.4	115.3								
