= Bhalara =

Village in India

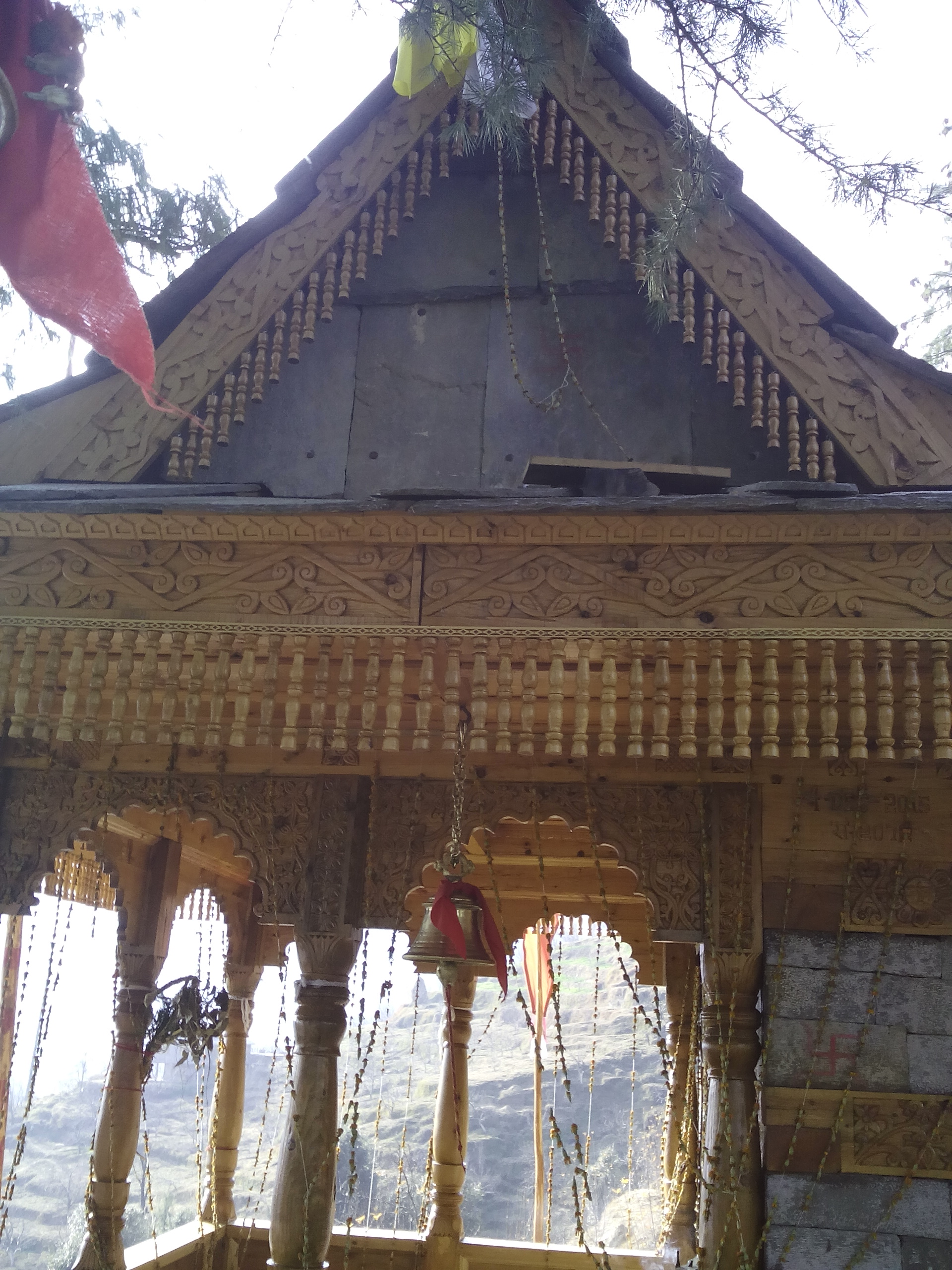
Lankara Devata temple

Bhalara is a village in Himachal Pradesh, India. It is located in the Rohru block of the Shimla district, and is situated 15 km from the town of Rohru.

Bhalara is known for its high quality apples, pears and cherries. The temple of Lankara Vir (Bann) deity is situated on the top of the hill above this village. Bhalara has now become a gram panchayat with a total number of ten villages which were formerly a part of Kui panchayat. Bhalara panchayat also is the home of the local deity Shri Bondra Sahib Maharaj who is followed and worshiped by some of people across the Mandalgarh valley and also have the privilege to host a spiritual festival, known as 'Bhoonda', which comes after fifty to seventy years. On this occasion, people of all castes and creeds gather. The festival is organized by the Temple committee and their rituals are performed during four days. Traditional drums and other musical instruments are played for whole nights and days.
