= 2024 ISSF Junior World Cup =

International shooting competition

- Sport: Shooting
- Hosts: (Spain) Granada (Italy) Porpetto
- Duration: 10 February – 16 July
- Winner: India

Seasons
- ← 2023 2025 →

The 2024 ISSF Junior World Cup is the annual edition of the ISSF Junior World Cup, governed by the International Shooting Sport Federation.

The 10 metre air rifle and air pistol events were held in Granada, Spain in February 2024. The Shotgun events were scheduled for October 2024 in Lima, Peru.

== Air pistol events ==
Event	Gold		Silver		Bronze	
Men	Imandos Bektenov; Kyrgyzstan	236.0	Andreas Koeppl; Germany	235.1	Ioane Khvareshia; Georgia	214.1
Women	Devanshi Dhama; India	240.0	Lakshita Lakshita; India	238.0	Mariami Prodiashvili; Georgia	213.1
Mixed Team	Georgia (GEO); Mariami Prodiashvili; Giorgi Mumladze	17	Georgia (GEO); Mariam Abramishvili; Ioane Khvareshia	9	Spain (ESP); Carla Caballero Fernandez; Lucas Sanchez Tome	16

== Air rifle events ==
Event	Gold		Silver		Bronze	
Men	Umamahesh Maddineni; India	252.1	Parth Rakesh Mane; India	250.6	Ajay Malik; India	229.0
Women	Isha Anil Taksale; India	251.8	Seren Thorne; Great Britain	249.7	Shambhavi Shravan Kshirsagar; India	227.6
Mixed Team	India (IND); Isha Anil Taksale; Umamahesh Maddineni	16	India (IND); Anvii Rathod; Abhinav Shaw	8	Great Britain (GBR); Seren Thorne; Aston Upton	16

== 10 Metre Medal table ==
Rank	Nation	Gold	Silver	Bronze	Total
1	India (IND)	4	3	2	9
2	Georgia (GEO)	1	1	2	4
3	Kyrgyzstan (KGZ)	1	0	0	1
4	Great Britain (GBR)	0	1	1	2
5	Germany (GER)	0	1	0	1
6	Spain (ESP)	0	0	1	1
Totals (6 entries)		6	6	6	18

== Shotgun events ==
The Shotgun events from 26 September to 7 October witnessed fair exposure of junior talent within Trap and Skeet events at the Las Palmas Shooting Range. With the events of both the men and the women undertaken independently as well as that of the mixed team events, the championship belonged to Italy with numerous golds including golds of Maria Theresa Giorgia Maccioni in Trap Women Junior and team golds of Trap Men and Women Junior events, along with fair performance in the Skeet Mixed Team Junior. Spain's Andres Garcia took the Trap Men Junior while Great Britain's Madeleine Zarina Russell took the Skeet Women Junior while Greece's Panagiotis Gerochristos upset in Skeet Men Junior. The United States of America, Czechia, and India too took large medals with the highlights including Czechia's gold of Trap Mixed Team Junior and the U.S. of bronze in Skeet Mixed Team Junior that depicts the competitive international play of the under-21 players.
