= Lower Koti =

Indian Village

Coordinates: 31.149°N 77.793°E

Lower Koti is a small village within the town of Rohru, in the Indian state of Himachal Pradesh.

== Facilities ==
Lower Koti is post office of Sidhroti, Chamrar, and Chupri. Lower Koti is also the gram Panchyat of village Chhupari, Sidhroti, Chamrara, Lowerkoti, Duskot, Chuni, Kashundhar, Shardu, Parsa, etc. The post office and Government senior secondary school Lower Koti is actually situated in village Chuni instead of Lowdrkoti.

People are enjoying banking facilities from tehsil headquarter Rohru as many nationalised, private, RRB and co-operative banks open their branches. There is a hospital and a Primary Health Centre. There is a 24/7 doctors' facility; all the people of the village use the hospital facility free of cost.

== Agriculture ==
People of village Lower Koti are mainly dependent on apple for their livelihood. Apples are the main cash crop of the village and only source of revenue. Many orchardists are now using modern grading and packing techniques for speedy work. Although the land holdings of people are small, the yield per acre is good.

== Education ==
Education level are highest as compare to state average. There are primary schools in almost all neighbor villages and senior secondary school at Lower Koti equipped with good infrastructure and qualified faculty.

== Religion ==
The main attractions of village Lower Koti are the temple of Lord Hanuman, which is believed to be almost 300 years old, and the historic temple of local god, which is situated in village Chhupari.

== Notable people ==
Devta marhaj stays in Chupri.
