= Himangshu =

Himangshu may refer to:

- Chandra, the Hindu lunar deity
- Himanshu, an Indian male given name
- Himangshu Dutta, Indian music director
- Himangshu Mohan Choudhury (died 2023), Indian civil servant

== See also ==
- Himansh Kohli (born 1989), Indian actor
- Himanshi Choudhry, British-Indian actress
- Himanshi Gawande, Indian field hockey player
- Himanshi Khurana, Indian model, actress and singer
- Himanshi Rathi, Indian para-chess player
- Himanshi Shelat, Indian writer
