= Shooting at the 2026 Asian Games – Women's 10 metre air pistol team =

Women's 10 metre air pistol team at the 2026 Asian Games
- Venue: Aichi Pref. General Shooting Gallery
- Dates: 23 September 2026
- Competitors: 42 from 14 nations

Medalists
| gold medal | China; Jiang Ranxin, Shen Yiyao, Yao Qianxun |
| silver medal | South Korea; Choo Ga-eun, Kim Bo-mi, Oh Ye-jin |
| bronze medal | Vietnam; Bùi Thị Thu Thủy, Nguyễn Thùy Trang, Trịnh Thu Vinh |

The women's 10 metre air pistol team competition at the 2026 Asian Games in Aichi Prefecture, Japan was held on 23 September 2026 at Aichi Pref. General Shooting Gallery.

== Schedule ==
All times are Japan Standard Time (UTC+09:00)

| Date | Time | Event |
|---|---|---|
| Wednesday, 23 September 2026 | 09:45 | Final |

== Records ==
Prior to this competition, the existing world, Asian and Games records were as follows.

| World Record | China | 1752 | Cairo, Egypt | 10 November 2025 |
| Asian Record | China | 1740 | Shymkent, Kazakhstan | 19 August 2025 |
| Games Record | China | 1736 | Hangzhou, China | 29 September 2023 |

== Results ==
| Rank | Team | Series | | | | | | Total | Xs | Notes |
| Rank | Team | 1 | 2 | 3 | 4 | 5 | 6 | Total | Xs | Notes |
|---|---|---|---|---|---|---|---|---|---|---|
| 1st place, gold medalist(s) | China (CHN) | 291 | 287 | 293 | 285 | 292 | 287 | 1735 | 56 | |
| | Jiang Ranxin | 98 | 98 | 97 | 95 | 98 | 94 | 580 | 22 | |
| | Shen Yiyao | 96 | 96 | 99 | 96 | 96 | 96 | 579 | 17 | |
| | Yao Qianxun | 97 | 93 | 97 | 94 | 98 | 97 | 576 | 17 | |
| 2nd place, silver medalist(s) | South Korea (KOR) | 288 | 289 | 292 | 286 | 285 | 290 | 1730 | 55 | |
| | Choo Ga-eun | 97 | 98 | 98 | 95 | 97 | 97 | 582 | 19 | |
| | Kim Bo-mi | 95 | 96 | 97 | 96 | 94 | 96 | 574 | 22 | |
| | Oh Ye-jin | 96 | 95 | 97 | 95 | 94 | 97 | 574 | 14 | |
| 3rd place, bronze medalist(s) | Vietnam (VIE) | 289 | 287 | 285 | 286 | 285 | 287 | 1719 | 46 | |
| | Bùi Thị Thu Thủy | 98 | 95 | 94 | 93 | 94 | 94 | 568 | 12 | |
| | Nguyễn Thùy Trang | 95 | 97 | 97 | 96 | 94 | 98 | 577 | 15 | |
| | Trịnh Thu Vinh | 96 | 95 | 94 | 97 | 97 | 95 | 574 | 19 | |
| 4 | India (IND) | 283 | 283 | 290 | 287 | 289 | 287 | 1719 | 44 | |
| | Manu Bhaker | 95 | 96 | 98 | 96 | 96 | 98 | 579 | 20 | |
| | Esha Singh | 94 | 93 | 95 | 97 | 97 | 96 | 572 | 12 | |
| | Suruchi Inder Singh | 94 | 94 | 97 | 94 | 96 | 93 | 568 | 12 | |
| 5 | Chinese Taipei (TPE) | 288 | 285 | 287 | 287 | 288 | 283 | 1718 | 39 | |
| | Cheng Yen-Ching | 97 | 95 | 95 | 97 | 97 | 94 | 575 | 18 | |
| | Wu Chia-ying | 94 | 97 | 93 | 93 | 97 | 97 | 571 | 9 | |
| | Yu Ai-wen | 97 | 93 | 99 | 97 | 94 | 92 | 572 | 12 | |
| 6 | Iran (IRI) | 288 | 285 | 285 | 290 | 284 | 283 | 1715 | 50 | |
| | Hanieh Rostamian | 94 | 96 | 93 | 97 | 97 | 94 | 571 | 21 | |
| | Zeynab Toumari Alilehsar | 96 | 92 | 97 | 96 | 95 | 92 | 568 | 10 | |
| | Yasi Samieh | 98 | 97 | 95 | 97 | 92 | 97 | 576 | 19 | |
| 7 | Japan (JPN) | 286 | 283 | 288 | 284 | 285 | 280 | 1706 | 35 | |
| | Aizawa Hikaru | 94 | 93 | 96 | 96 | 96 | 92 | 567 | 10 | |
| | Karon Nakagawa | 96 | 94 | 98 | 95 | 95 | 94 | 572 | 12 | |
| | Chizuru Sasaki | 96 | 96 | 94 | 93 | 94 | 94 | 567 | 13 | |
| 8 | North Korea (PRK) | 286 | 280 | 283 | 285 | 280 | 285 | 1699 | 41 | |
| | Kim Hyon Suk | 97 | 93 | 96 | 94 | 95 | 95 | 570 | 16 | |
| | Pak Hyon Gyong | 94 | 94 | 95 | 95 | 94 | 96 | 568 | 14 | |
| | Ri Su Rim | 95 | 93 | 92 | 96 | 91 | 94 | 561 | 11 | |
| 9 | Indonesia (INA) | 281 | 281 | 283 | 283 | 283 | 287 | 1698 | 35 | |
| | Rihadatul Asyifa | 93 | 95 | 95 | 92 | 96 | 96 | 567 | 14 | |
| | Arista Perdana Putri Darmoyo | 97 | 94 | 93 | 98 | 96 | 94 | 572 | 14 | |
| | Derli Amalia Putri | 91 | 92 | 95 | 93 | 91 | 97 | 559 | 7 | |
| 10 | Kazakhstan (KAZ) | 279 | 282 | 275 | 285 | 282 | 278 | 1681 | 36 | |
| | Saule Alimbek | 90 | 92 | 90 | 95 | 90 | 92 | 549 | 9 | |
| | Popelova Valeriya | 96 | 95 | 95 | 94 | 99 | 96 | 575 | 19 | |
| | Nina Starova | 93 | 95 | 90 | 96 | 93 | 90 | 557 | 8 | |
| 11 | Thailand (THA) | 280 | 278 | 276 | 277 | 281 | 283 | 1675 | 33 | |
| | Surassawadee Bubphachat | 94 | 91 | 91 | 95 | 94 | 92 | 557 | 8 | |
| | Natsara Champalat | 92 | 91 | 93 | 88 | 92 | 95 | 551 | 9 | |
| | Kamonlak Saencha | 94 | 96 | 92 | 94 | 95 | 96 | 567 | 16 | |
| 12 | Mongolia (MGL) | 276 | 275 | 281 | 281 | 278 | 282 | 1673 | 35 | |
| | Buyandelger Altankhuyag | 88 | 88 | 93 | 95 | 93 | 90 | 547 | 10 | |
| | Ariunzaya Amarbaysgalan | 93 | 94 | 91 | 94 | 94 | 96 | 562 | 13 | |
| | Tömörchödöriin Bayartsetseg | 95 | 93 | 97 | 92 | 91 | 96 | 564 | 12 | |
| 13 | Maldives (MDV) | 265 | 272 | 259 | 267 | 262 | 259 | 1584 | 23 | |
| | Fathimath Faiha | 84 | 90 | 81 | 86 | 88 | 81 | 510 | 7 | |
| | Eshal Misbah | 94 | 93 | 89 | 91 | 96 | 95 | 558 | 12 | |
| | Mariyam Malak Mohamed Muslih | 87 | 89 | 89 | 90 | 78 | 83 | 516 | 4 | |
| 14 | Qatar (QAT) | 93 | 93 | 91 | 92 | 97 | 94 | 560 | 12 | DNF |
| | Aisha Abdulla M F Al-Abdulla | | | | | | | | | |
| | Salma Abbas F Almass | | | | | | | | | |
| | Duaa Rahmatalla M Habib | 93 | 93 | 91 | 92 | 97 | 94 | 560 | 12 | |
