= Sharog =

Coordinates: 31.120°N 77.130°E

Sharog is a village in Shimla district in the Indian state of Himachal Pradesh. It is a located near the town of Rohru and is about 125 kilometres (78 mi) away from Shimla and 8 km from Rohru.

In the year 2021, village Sharog along with village Barara and village Palkan forms a new panchayat namely Sharog-Barara Gram panchayat.
