= Simranpreet Kaur Brar =

Indian sport shooter (born 2004)

Personal information
- Born: 2 October 2004 (age 22) Faridkot, India

Sport
- Sport: Shooting
- Event: 25 m pistol

Achievements and titles
- Personal best: 41 WRJ (2025)
Medal record
Women's shooting
Representing India
Women's 25 m pistol
World Cup Final
Gold medal – first place	2025 Doha	Individual
Asian Championships
Bronze medal – third place	2025 Shymkent	Team
World Cup
Silver medal – second place	2025 Lima	Individual
Junior Asian Championships
Silver medal – second place	2023 Changwon	Individual
World University Championships
Gold medal – first place	2024 New Delhi	Team
Bronze medal – third place	2024 New Delhi	Individual
Women's 25 m rapid fire pistol
World Championships
Silver medal – second place	2022 Cairo	Mixed team
Junior World Cup
Gold medal – first place	2022 Suhl	Mixed team
25 m standart pistol]]
World Championships
Silver medal – second place	2026 Doha	25 m standard pistol team

Simranpreet Kaur Brar (born 2 October 2004) is an Indian sport shooter who specializes in the 25 m pistol event.

== Career ==
Simranpreet won gold in the 25 m rapid fire mixed team event at the 2022 Junior World Cup and silver in the same event (with Anish Bhanwala) at the 2022 World Shooting Championships.

She won the silver medal in the women's 25 m pistol at the World Cup in Lima, her first senior international podium. Later, she also won team bronze in the same event at the 2025 Asian Championships.

On 7 December 2025, she won gold in the women's 25 m pistol event at the ISSF World Cup Final held in Doha. She scored 41/50 in the final setting a new Junior World Record, finishing ahead of Yao Qianxun and Doreen Vennekamp. The victory marked her first World Cup Final medal.
