= Suruchi =

Suruchi is a given name. People with the name include:

- Suruchi Adarkar, Indian Marathi actress
- Suruchi Singh (born 2006), Indian sports shooter

== See also ==
- New Alipore Suruchi Sangha
