= Arya Borse =

Indian sport shooter (born 2002)

Personal information
- Full name: Arya Rajesh Borse
- Born: 2 December 2002 (age 23) Nashik, Maharashtra, India

Sport
- Sport: Shooting
- Event: 10 m air rifle
Medal record
Women's 10 m air rifle shooting
Representing India
Asian Championships
Gold medal – first place	2026 New Delhi	Team
World Cup
Gold medal – first place	2025 Munich	Mixed team
Silver medal – second place	2025 Lima	Mixed team
Silver medal – second place	2025 Buenos Aires	Mixed team
Junior World Cup
Gold medal – first place	2022 Suhl	Team

Arya Rajesh Borse (born 2 December 2002) is an Indian sport shooter who competes in the 10 m air rifle discipline.

== Early life ==
Arya was born on 2 December 2002 in Nashik. Her mother, Madhavi, is an English teacher; while Rajesh, her father previously worked in a bank. She developed an interest in sports during her school years and was enrolled in a pistol shooting club at Ashoka Universal School under coach Abhay Kamble, before switching to rifle shooting. Arya currently trains at the National Centre of Excellence (NCOE) in Delhi.

== Career ==
At the Junior World Cup in Suhl in 2022, Arya was part of the Indian women's air rifle team that won the gold medal. She later competed at senior level. At the 2025 World Cup in Munich, she partnered with Arjun Babuta in the 10 m air rifle mixed team event to win the gold medal, defeating the reigning Olympic champions from China. She also won silver medals in the same discipline at the 2025 World Cups in Lima and Buenos Aires with Rudrankksh Patil.
