= Seren Thorne =

British sport shooter

Personal information
- Born: Gwenllian Seren Thorne; 3 November 2003 (age 22) Haverfordwest
- Education: Ysgol Casblaidd, Ysgol Bro Gwaun, Haverfordwest VC High School.

Sport
- Country: United Kingdom; Wales
- Sport: Shooting
- Event: 10 metre air rifle
Medal record
Women's shooting
Representing Great Britain
World Cup
| Silver medal – second place | 2024 Granada | 10m Air Rifle Women Junior |
| Bronze medal – third place | 2024 Granada | 10m Air Rifle Mixed Team Junior |

Gwenllian Seren Thorne (born 3 November 2003) is a British sports shooter who won two medals at the ISSF Junior World Cup in Granada. She is the British Junior Women's record holder for both Qualification and Finals in the 10 metre air rifle event.

== Career ==
Thorne began shooting as a teenager. In 2021, she was the top ranked Welsh athlete in the British Shooting Schools Rifle Championship. She placed third in the National Finals.

In 2022, Seren was selected to represent Wales at the Commonwealth Shooting Federation (European Division) Championships in Cardiff. She finished 7th in the Women's Air Rifle.

In December 2023, she set a new British Junior Record of 621.8 at the Welsh Airgun Championships in Cardiff.

In February 2024, she won a silver medal in the Air Rifle at the 2024 ISSF Junior World Cup, setting a new British Junior Finals Record. The next day she won a bronze medal in the Air Rifle Mixed Team with teammate Aston Upton. At the end of February 2024, she became the British Junior Women's Champion at the British Open Airgun Championships. February 2025 Seren won a silver medal, was named the British Confined Champion and the British Universities champion at the British Open Airgun Championships in her first competition as a senior. She was selected onto the British Olympic Potential programme in April 2025. At the Welsh International Open Airgun Championships, she won a gold and two bronze medals. She was also the Welsh confined senior champion. In January 2026 Seren was selected onto the British Shooting Brisbane and Beyond Pathway. She shot a Welsh Senior record at the British Shooting Air Series, alongside an MCS for GBR. At the British Open Championships in 2026, Seren won the title of British Women's rifle champion, British Confined Champion and British Universities 10m air champion.
