= Arhal =

Coordinates: 31°13′N 77°42′E

Adhal is a village in Shimla district in the Indian state of Himachal Pradesh. It is a located near the town of Rohru and is about 125 kilometres (78 mi) away from Shimla and 8 km from Rohru. On 1–3 January 2016, there was the celebration of the festival Shaant Maha Yagya of Devi jaga mata of Arhal which came after 47 years. The valley of Arhal is known for its natural environment and sites.

The panchayat of three villages Batari, Kanda and Arhal is called Arhal panchayat. There are about 2,500 voters in Arhal panchayat; it is the second-biggest panchayat of the tehsil Rohru.
