= Choo Ga-eun =

South Korean sports shooter

Personal information
- Nationality: South Korean
- Born: 5 January 2001 (age 25)

Sport
- Sport: Sports shooting
Medal record
Women's shooting
Representing South Korea
World Championships
Bronze medal – third place	2026 Doha	10 m air pistol team
Asian Games
Gold medal – first place	2026 Aichi–Nagoya	10 m air pistol
Silver medal – second place	2026 Aichi–Nagoya	10 m air pistol team
Silver medal – second place	2026 Aichi–Nagoya	10 m air Pistol mixed team
Asian Championships
Gold medal – first place	2019 Doha	10 m air pistol team

Choo Ga-eun (Korean: 추가은, 秋 佳誾; born 5 January 2001) is a South Korean sports shooter. She competed in the women's 10 metre air pistol event at the 2020 Summer Olympics.
