= Raiza Dhillon =

Indian skeet shooter (born 2004)

Personal information
- Born: 20 April 2004 (age 22) Shamgarh, Haryana, India

Sport
- Sport: Shooting
- Event: Skeet

Achievements and titles
- Personal best: 122 JNR (2024)
Medal record
Women's skeet shooting
Representing India
Asian Games
Bronze medal – third place	2026 Aichi–Nagoya	Team
Asian Championships
Gold medal – first place	2024 Kuwait	Team
Silver medal – second place	2024 Kuwait	Individual
Bronze medal – third place	2024 Kuwait	Mixed team
Bronze medal – third place	2025 Shymkent	Team
Junior World Championships
Gold medal – first place	2021 Lima	Team
Silver medal – second place	2023 Changwon	Individual
Junior World Cup
Silver medal – second place	2025 Suhl	Individual
Silver medal – second place	2025 New Delhi	Individual

Raiza Dhillon (born 20 April 2004) is an Indian skeet shooter. She was the youngest Indian shooter at the 2024 Paris Olympics. She created a Junior National record with a score of 122 in the qualification round at the 2024 National Shooting Championships.

== Early life ==
Dhillon is from Shamgarh, Karnal District, Haryana. Her father, Ravijit Singh Dhillon, is a farmer, and her mother, Gul Dhillon, is a sarpanch of Shamgarh, their native village near Karnal. Both of them encouraged her to take up the sport at an early age. Their family shifted their base to Panchkula where her mother, Gul, introduced her to sports like tennis and swimming and also into Bharatnatyam. However, the youngster chose to take up shooting at the age of 12, and wanted to shoot with big guns which sight she is quite familiar with after watching the 20-gun stock of her great-grandfather, Jagirdar Gurinder Singh Dhillon. She attended coaching camps at the Gagan Narang Shooting Academy in Pune but settled with coach Amrinder Singh Cheema, who is her father's friend, after selecting skeet as her pet event.

== Career ==
=== Olympics ===
Dhillon scored 113 and finished 23rd in the qualification round and was eliminated in the women's skeet event of the Shooting at the 2024 Summer Olympics – Qualification.

Earlier, she secured an Olympic quota berth for the 2024 Summer Olympics in the women's skeet event by winning a gold medal at the Asian Shotgun Championships, an Asian Olympic qualifier event on 20 January 2024 at Kuwait City. She became the first Indian woman to potentially qualify for an Olympic skeet event. It also brought the Indian Olympic quota count to 19.

The quota berth won by a shooter is a berth for the country and the Federation, which can nominate any shooter for Olympics, as per set criteria.

=== International ===
She started her international career representing Junior India at the World Championships in Lima in 2021. She took part in individual, team and mixed team events. In 2022, she represented India in all the three skeet events again in the World Championships at Osijek, Croatia, and was part of the team event where India won a gold. In 2023, she represented India again in the skeet junior women mixed and individual events at World Championships in Changwon, Korea and won a silver medal in the individual skeet event. Thus, she become the second Indian woman skeet shooter to win a World Championship medal after Ganemat Sekhon in 2021. In March 2023, she also took part in the skeet women's individual and mixed team events in the senior category for India at Larnaca, Cyprus. In 2023, she participated in the Junior World Cup event at Suhl, Germany, in the same events.

In April 2025, she entered finals and finished fifth in her first Senior ISSF World Cup in Lima.

=== Junior World Cup ===
On 22 May 2025, she won her first individual ISSF World Cup medal, a silver medal in women's skeet event at the ISSF Junior World Cup at Suhl, Germany. She shot 51 targets out of 60 in the final and finished two shots behind Phoebe Bodley-Scott of Great Britain, who shot 53. Germany's Annabella Hettmer won the bronze. She scored 71 after three rounds made it 116 after five rounds of 25 shots each but tied with two other shooters in second place behind Zarina Madeleine Russell of Great Britain. But she won and qualified second into the final after topping the three-way 24-shot shoot off with Phoebe and Hettmer.

=== Domestic ===
In December 2024, she beat Simranpreet Kaur Johal's junior record of 120 set at the 2018 Jaipur Nationals, on way to her qualification to the women's skeet final. She also equalled the National record of 122 by Ganemat Sekhon set at the ISSF World Cup final at Dr. Karni Singh Range, Tughlakabad, Delhi, also in 2024. Later in February 2025, she set 124 out of 125 at the All India Inter-University Championships and equalled Sekhon's National record of 124.

She joined the Sports Authority of India'a National Centre of Excellence in 2023.
