= Kadiwan =

- village
- Location within Himachal Pradesh Location within India
- Coordinates: 31.235°N 77.609°E
- Country: India
- State: Himachal Pradesh
- District: Shimla
- Tehsil: Rohru
- Elevation: 2,277 m (7,470 ft)

Population (2011)
  - Total: 651

Languages
  - Official: Hindi
  - Regional: Mahasu Pahari (Kochi)
- Time zone: UTC+5:30 (IST)

Kadiwan is a village in Gram panchayat Kadiwan tehsil Rohru District Shimla, Himachal Pradesh. It is located on the border of tehsil Rohru and sharing its boundaries with Kotkhai Tehsil of District Shimla. According to data released by the Election Commission Himachal Pradesh in Panchayat Election 2021, there is a total of 651 people in the village, with 358 males and 293 females.
