= Khadrala =

Place in Rohru, Himachal Pradesh, India

Khadrala is located in tehsil Rohru of Himachal Pradesh. It is one of the oldest trading centers of upper Shimla lying adjacent to old Hindustan-Tibet Road.

It is an historic place which has been visited by the former prime minister Pandit Jawaharlal Nehru along with his daughter Indira Gandhi.

It has a post office and a bank, one of the oldest in upper Shimla. It also provides a beautiful view of the green Mandalgarh Valley containing various fauna and flora. Chanshal and Mural Danda peaks are visible from here.
