= Himanshu Khagta =

Indian photographer (born 1990)

- हिमांशु खागटा
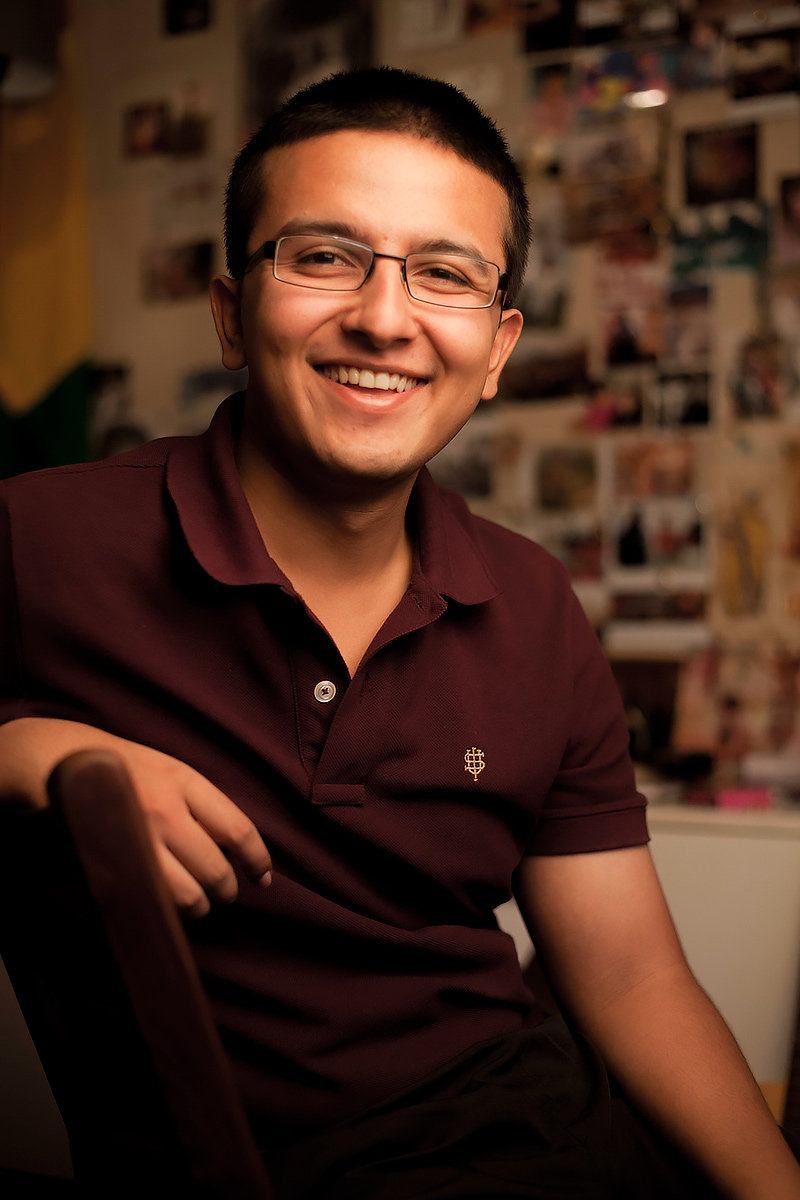
- Born: 29 June 1990 (age 36); Rohru, Shimla district, Himachal Pradesh, India
- Education: B.A. Political Science and Government
- Alma mater: DAV College, Chandigarh
- Occupation: Photographer
- Known for: Documentary photography; Travel photography
- Website: khagta.com

Himanshu Khagta (born 29 June 1990) is an Indian photographer based in the Indian Himalayas. He is known for documenting life in mountainous areas of India. His photographs have been featured in many publications including: The New York Times, The International Herald Tribune, BBC Travel, Condé Nast Traveller and Outlook Traveller.

Raised in Shimla, Himachal Pradesh, Khagta's work often revolves around the events and ordinary lives of the people that live in the region around his hometown. His two long-term projects, Life in Spiti and Life in Shimla chronicle his experiences living in the city of Shimla and the Spiti Valley. He plans to publish his work in print in two books he is writing which will be heavily laden with his photographs.

== Early life and education ==
Khagta was born on 29 June 1990 in Rohru, Shimla district but grew up in the nearby city of Shimla. He attended Dayanand Public School in Shimla. After graduating from the secondary school, he attended DAV College in Section 10, Chandigarh. He graduated with a Bachelor of Arts degree in Political science and Government in 2011.

Khagta is an entirely self-taught photographer; he learned the art by watching videos and studying tutorials. His photographic career started accidentally while he was still in high school. At the time he would take pictures of his hometown and upload them to Flickr. Travel magazines noticed his work and requested his photos for their publications. He eventually become a sought-after travel photographer and began traveling around the country. While still in college, he began working professionally as a freelance photographer.

== career ==
In 2008, a portrait by Khagta was a finalist in Smithsonian Magazine's 6th Annual Photo Contest, people category.

In May 2012, Khagta joined Jaibir Singh Virk and Amit Chaudhary as they attempted to set the Limca World Record for the longest Himalayan expedition on a tractor. Virk and Chaudhary took turns driving the 3,623 km (2,251 mi) in and around the Himalayas, while Khagta drove a support vehicle and documented trip.

In fall 2012, he began a project to document the Great Wash Yatra. Sponsored by WASH United and Quicksand, the yatra was a multi-faceted campaign to promote WASH: "Water, Sanitation and Hygiene." Partly funded by the Bill & Melinda Gates Foundation, the festival was modeled after traditional Indian mela included musical, theatrical and artistic performances, entertainment and attractions, as well as food and drink. Khagta documented the event for a month and half. Living in tents, he followed the caravan as it travelled about 2,000 km (1,200 mi) all around central India.

In 2014, Khagta spent a whole winter in the Spiti Valley, a desert mountain valley high in the Himalaya's that is cut off from the rest of the world in the colder months of winter and spring. He document the day-to-day lives of the people of Spiti Valley in a long-term project he named Life in Spiti. Soon after leaving Spiti, he began a similar long-term project named Life in Shimla documenting the landscapes, events, people and culture of his hometown.
