= Mohammad Beiranvand =

Iranian sport shooter (born 2008)

Personal information
- Born: August 25, 2008 (age 17) Borujerd, Lorestan, Iran

Sport
- Country: Iran
- Sport: Shooting
- Event: Trap
- Coached by: Nariman Nikkho Rafe(National Team)
Medal record
Men's shooting
Representing Iran
Asian Championships
Gold medal – first place	2024 Kuwait City	Trap
Silver medal – second place	2024 Kuwait City	Trap Mixed Team
Bronze medal – third place	2023 Changwon	Trap Team
- Updated on 20 July 2024

Mohammad "Saman" Beiranvand (Persian: محمد بیرانوند; born 25 August 2008) Is an Iranian shooting athlete. He is the only Iranian trap shooter in the 2024 Summer Olympics.
