= Shooting at the 2026 Asian Games – Men's 10 metre air pistol team =

Men's 10 metre air pistol team at the 2026 Asian Games
- Venue: Aichi Pref. General Shooting Gallery
- Dates: 24 September 2026
- Competitors: 45 from 15 nations

Medalists
gold medal	China; Bu Shuaihang, Hu Kai, Xie Yu
silver medal	Indonesia; Sulthanul Aulia Maruf, Muhamad Iqbal Raia Prabowo, Wira Sukmana
bronze medal	Japan; Masaki Iwasa, Seiji Morikawa, Junnosuke Nakayama

The men's 10 metre air pistol team competition at the 2026 Asian Games in Aichi Prefecture, Japan was held on 24 September 2026 at Aichi Pref. General Shooting Gallery.

== Schedule ==
All times are Japan Standard Time (UTC+09:00)

Date	Time	Event
Thursday, 24 September 2026	09:45	Final

== Records ==
Prior to this competition, the existing world, Asian and Games records were as follows.

World Record	Russia	1759	Deauville, France	16 March 2007
Asian Record	China	1759	Kuwait City, Kuwait	9 March 2014
Games Record	China	1750	Busan, South Korea	3 March 2002

== Results ==
Rank	Team	Series						Total	Xs	Notes
Rank	Team	1	2	3	4	5	6	Total	Xs	Notes
1st place, gold medalist(s)	China (CHN)	289	296	290	291	285	292	1743	70	
	Bu Shuaihang	96	99	98	97	95	98	583	21	
	Hu Kai	97	98	97	97	96	97	582	23	
	Xie Yu	96	99	95	97	94	97	578	26	
2nd place, silver medalist(s)	Indonesia (INA)	295	285	291	291	294	287	1743	57	
	Sulthanul Aulia Maruf	99	96	98	95	97	98	583	16	
	Muhamad Iqbal Raia Prabowo	99	96	99	100	99	96	589	21	
	Wira Sukmana	97	93	94	96	98	93	571	20	
3rd place, bronze medalist(s)	Japan (JPN)	289	286	292	283	292	288	1730	54	
	Masaki Iwasa	97	96	96	96	97	95	577	21	
	Seiji Morikawa	95	97	99	92	98	95	576	19	
	Junnosuke Nakayama	97	93	97	95	97	98	577	14	
4	India (IND)	291	289	290	283	286	288	1727	53	
	Aakash Bharadwaj	97	95	98	94	97	98	579	20	
	Kamaljeet Sahlot	97	98	100	94	93	98	580	18	
	Kedarling Balakrishna Uchaganve	97	96	92	95	96	92	568	15	
5	Uzbekistan (UZB)	286	283	289	289	290	290	1727	50	
	Sodikjon Abdullaev	95	95	95	96	97	97	575	13	
	Mukhammad Kamalov	94	93	97	94	97	95	570	16	
	Vladimir Svechnikov	97	95	97	99	96	98	582	21	
6	North Korea (PRK)	288	284	291	283	293	283	1722	60	
	Ho Se Rim	95	94	97	94	98	95	573	20	
	Kim Song-guk	96	97	97	94	96	94	574	19	
	Rim Ryu-song	97	93	97	95	99	94	575	21	
7	Vietnam (VIE)	283	286	281	293	290	289	1722	50	
	Lại Công Minh	96	99	93	98	99	96	581	20	
	Nguyễn Đình Thành	93	94	93	98	96	97	571	13	
	Phạm Quang Huy	94	93	95	97	95	96	570	17	
8	South Korea (KOR)	285	288	285	288	286	284	1716	51	
	Hong Su-hyeon	97	95	98	99	96	96	581	16	
	Kim Tae-young	94	95	90	93	94	97	563	15	
	So Seung-seob	94	98	97	96	96	91	572	20	
9	Iran (IRI)	286	286	283	291	285	285	1716	39	
	Mohammadrasoul Efati	95	95	94	95	95	94	568	6	
	Javad Foroughi	94	92	93	97	94	98	568	17	
	Vahid Golkhandan	97	99	96	99	96	93	580	16	
10	Kazakhstan (KAZ)	281	282	288	284	287	283	1705	47	
	Kirill Fedkin	94	97	95	95	94	94	569	15	
	Eldar Imankulov	92	90	95	91	95	91	554	7	
	Valeriy Rakhimzhan	95	95	98	98	98	98	582	25	
11	Saudi Arabia (KSA)	282	280	280	285	283	290	1700	41	
	Atallah Nidaa K Al-Anazi	93	94	94	96	96	97	570	16	
	Safar Al-Dosari	96	94	92	92	95	96	565	11	
	Fahad Al-Mutairi	93	92	94	97	92	97	565	14	
12	Mongolia (MGL)	280	282	286	282	288	282	1700	37	
	Badamgarav Enkhtaivan	94	93	95	92	95	92	561	9	
	Enkhtaivany Davaakhüü	93	95	98	96	99	95	576	18	
	Buyanzaya Shirgal	93	94	93	94	94	95	563	10	
13	Philippines (PHI)	278	280	284	280	288	281	1691	32	
	Michael Angelo Fernandez	95	90	96	94	97	96	568	13	
	Timothy John Poblete	91	94	92	92	95	89	553	4	
	Carlo Deniel Valdez	92	96	96	94	96	96	570	15	
14	Qatar (QAT)	277	278	276	280	278	281	1670	36	
	Nasser Salem H R Al-Senaid	92	93	89	95	94	95	558	11	
	Khalid Abdulnasser A A Al-Shaiba	92	92	94	94	92	93	557	16	
	Mohammed Nasser A A Alyafei	93	93	93	91	92	93	555	9	
15	Maldives (MDV)	271	280	273	274	276	278	1652	26	
	Mohamed Subhaath Hamid Shafeeg	84	95	92	89	88	91	539	10	
	Maadh Mohamed Thoha	92	92	92	92	93	93	554	8	
	Ziyan Ziyau	95	93	89	93	95	94	559	8	
