= 2025 ISSF Junior World Cup =

International shooting competition

- Sport: Shooting
- Defending champions: India (2024)
- Hosts: (Germany) Suhl (India) New Delhi
- Duration: 19 May – 2 October

Seasons
- ← 2024 2026 →

The 2025 ISSF Junior World Cup is the annual edition of the ISSF Junior World Cup in the Olympic shooting events, governed by the International Shooting Sport Federation.

== Calendar ==
The calendar for the 2025 ISSF Junior World Cup is as follows:

| Leg | Dates | Location | Type | Venue |
|---|---|---|---|---|
| 1 | 19–27 May | (Germany) Suhl | Rifle/Pistol/Shotgun | Erich-Krempel-Hall |
| 2 | 24 September–2 October | (India) New Delhi | Rifle/Pistol/Shotgun | Dr. Karni Singh Shooting Range |

== Participants ==
Participants for the 2025 ISSF Junior World Cup

| Leg | Location | Nations | Athletes |
|---|---|---|---|
| 1 | Suhl | 59 | 638 |
| 2 | New Delhi | 19 | 208 |

== Rifle events ==
=== Men's individual ===
10m Air Rifle
| Stage | Venue | 1st place, gold medalist(s) | 2nd place, silver medalist(s) | 3rd place, bronze medalist(s) |
|---|---|---|---|---|
| 1 | (Germany) Suhl | Huang Liwanlin (CHN) | Braden Wayne Peiser (USA) | Naraen Pranav (IND) |
| 2 | (India) New Delhi | Himanshu (IND) | Dmitrii Pimenov (AIN) | Abhinav Shaw (IND) |

50m Rifle 3 Positions
| Stage | Venue | 1st place, gold medalist(s) | 2nd place, silver medalist(s) | 3rd place, bronze medalist(s) |
|---|---|---|---|---|
| 1 | (Germany) Suhl | Romain Aufrere (FRA) | Jens Oestli (NOR) | Adriyan Karmakar (IND) |
| 2 | (India) New Delhi | Dmitrii Pimenov (AIN) | Adriyan Karmakar (IND) | Kamil Nuriakhmetov (AIN) |

50m Rifle Prone
| Stage | Venue | 1st place, gold medalist(s) | 2nd place, silver medalist(s) | 3rd place, bronze medalist(s) |
|---|---|---|---|---|
| 1 | (Germany) Suhl | Jesper Johansson (SWE) | Adriyan Karmakar (IND) | Griffin Lake (USA) |
| 2 | (India) New Delhi | Kamil Nuriakhmetov (AIN) | Deependra Singh Shekhawat (IND) | Rohit Kanyan (IND) |

=== Women's individual ===
10m Air Rifle
| Stage | Venue | 1st place, gold medalist(s) | 2nd place, silver medalist(s) | 3rd place, bronze medalist(s) |
|---|---|---|---|---|
| 1 | (Germany) Suhl | Shambhavi Kshirsagar (IND) | Ojasvi Thakur (IND) | Carlotta Salafia (ITA) |
| 2 | (India) New Delhi | Ojasvi Thakur (IND) | Hrudya Kondur (IND) | Shambhavi Kshirsagar (IND) |

50m Rifle 3 Positions
| Stage | Venue | 1st place, gold medalist(s) | 2nd place, silver medalist(s) | 3rd place, bronze medalist(s) |
|---|---|---|---|---|
| 1 | (Germany) Suhl | Vivien Joy Jaeggi (SUI) | Emely Jaeggi (SUI) | Xu Yingliu (CHN) |
| 2 | (India) New Delhi | Anushka Thokur (IND) | Anastasiia Sorokina (AIN) | Mariia Kruglova (AIN) |

Rifle Prone
| Stage | Venue | 1st place, gold medalist(s) | 2nd place, silver medalist(s) | 3rd place, bronze medalist(s) |
|---|---|---|---|---|
| 1 | (Germany) Suhl | Caroline Finnestad Lund (NOR) | Klaudie Katz (CZE) | Wilhelmina Kalina Woskowiak (POL) |
| 2 | (India) New Delhi | Anushka Thokur (IND) | Anshika (IND) | Aadhya Agrawal (IND) |

=== Mixed Team ===
10m Air Rifle
| Stage | Venue | 1st place, gold medalist(s) | 2nd place, silver medalist(s) | 3rd place, bronze medalist(s) |
|---|---|---|---|---|
| 1 | (Germany) Suhl | China; Huang Yuting; Huang Liwanlin | India; Khyaty Chaudhary; Naraen Pranav | India; Shambhavi Kshirsagar; Himanshu |
| 2 | (India) New Delhi | India; Isha Taksale; Himanshu | India; Shambhavi Kshrisagar; Naraen Pranav | Authorised Neutral Athletes; Varvara Kardakova; Kamil Nuriakhmetov |

== Pistol events ==
=== Men's individual ===
10m Air Pistol
| Stage | Venue | 1st place, gold medalist(s) | 2nd place, silver medalist(s) | 3rd place, bronze medalist(s) |
|---|---|---|---|---|
| 1 | (Germany) Suhl | Ivan Semenikhin (AIN) | Imandos Bektenov (KGZ) | Yury Krautsou (AIN) |
| 2 | (India) New Delhi | Jonathan Antony (IND) | Luca Arrighi (ITA) | Lucas Sanchez Tome (ESP) |

25m Rapid Fire Pistol
| Stage | Venue | 1st place, gold medalist(s) | 2nd place, silver medalist(s) | 3rd place, bronze medalist(s) |
|---|---|---|---|---|
| 1 | (Germany) Suhl | Thomas Clement (FRA) | Wiktor Lukasz (POL) | Mukesh Nelavalli (IND) |
| 2 | (India) New Delhi | Aleksandr Kovalev (AIN) | Mukesh Nelavalli (IND) | Suraj Sharma (IND) |

=== Women's individual ===
10m Air Pistol
| Stage | Venue | 1st place, gold medalist(s) | 2nd place, silver medalist(s) | 3rd place, bronze medalist(s) |
|---|---|---|---|---|
| 1 | (Germany) Suhl | Kanak Budhwar (IND) | Anna Dulce (MLD) | Yen-Ching Cheng (TPE) |
| 2 | (India) New Delhi | – | Rashmika Sahgal (IND) | – |

25m Rapid Fire Pistol
| Stage | Venue | 1st place, gold medalist(s) | 2nd place, silver medalist(s) | 3rd place, bronze medalist(s) |
|---|---|---|---|---|
| 1 | (Germany) Suhl | Tejaswani Singh (IND) | Alina Nestsiarovich (AIN) | Miriam Jako (HUN) |
| 2 | (India) New Delhi | – | Tejaswani Singh (IND) | – |

=== Mixed team ===
10m Air Pistol
| Stage | Venue | 1st place, gold medalist(s) | 2nd place, silver medalist(s) | 3rd place, bronze medalist(s) |
|---|---|---|---|---|
| 1 | (Germany) Suhl | China; Jin Bohan; Zhang Yingtao | Ukraine; Yuliia Isachenko; Maksym Himon | Italy; Alessandra Fait; Francesco Rutigliani |
| 2 | (India) New Delhi | India; Rashmika Sahgal; Kapil Bainsla | India; Vanshika Chaudhary; Jonathan Antony | – |

== Shotgun events ==
=== Men's individual ===
Trap
| Stage | Venue | 1st place, gold medalist(s) | 2nd place, silver medalist(s) | 3rd place, bronze medalist(s) |
|---|---|---|---|---|
| 1 | (Germany) Suhl | Fabrizio Fisichella (ITA) | Thomas William Betts (GBR) | Toni Gudelj (CRO) |
| 2 | (India) New Delhi | – | – | Vinay Chandrawat (IND) |

Skeet
| Stage | Venue | 1st place, gold medalist(s) | 2nd place, silver medalist(s) | 3rd place, bronze medalist(s) |
|---|---|---|---|---|
| 1 | (Germany) Suhl | Lassi Kauppinen (FIN) | Matteo Bragalli (ITA) | Muhammet Seyhun Kaya (TUR) |
| 2 | (India) New Delhi | – | – | – |

=== Women's individual ===
Trap
| Stage | Venue | 1st place, gold medalist(s) | 2nd place, silver medalist(s) | 3rd place, bronze medalist(s) |
|---|---|---|---|---|
| 1 | (Germany) Suhl | Kseniia Stepina (AIN) | Maria Teresa Giorgia Maccioni (ITA) | Martina Montani (ITA) |
| 2 | (India) New Delhi | – | – | – |

Skeet
| Stage | Venue | 1st place, gold medalist(s) | 2nd place, silver medalist(s) | 3rd place, bronze medalist(s) |
|---|---|---|---|---|
| 1 | (Germany) Suhl | Pheobe Bodley-Scott (GBR) | Raiza Dhillon (IND) | Annabella Hettmer (GER) |
| 2 | (India) New Delhi | – | Raiza Dhillon (IND) | Mansi Raghuwanshi (IND) |

=== Mixed team ===
Trap
| Stage | Venue | 1st place, gold medalist(s) | 2nd place, silver medalist(s) | 3rd place, bronze medalist(s) |
|---|---|---|---|---|
| 1 | (Germany) Suhl | Italy; Luca Gerri; Maria Teresa Giorgia Maccioni | France; Thomas Agez; Jeanne Auriche | Italy; Fabrizio Fisichella; Martina Montani |
| 2 | (India) New Delhi | – | – | – |

== Medal table ==
| Rank | Nation | Gold | Silver | Bronze | Total |
|---|---|---|---|---|---|
| 1 | India (IND) | 11 | 14 | 12 | 37 |
| 2 | Individual Neutral Athletes (AIN) | 7 | 4 | 5 | 16 |
| 3 | Italy (ITA) | 4 | 4 | 5 | 13 |
| 4 | China (CHN) | 3 | 0 | 1 | 4 |
| 5 | Czech Republic (CZE) | 2 | 2 | 0 | 4 |
| 6 | France (FRA) | 2 | 1 | 0 | 3 |
| 7 | Finland (FIN) | 1 | 1 | 0 | 2 |
| 7 | Great Britain (GBR) | 1 | 1 | 0 | 2 |
| 7 | Norway (NOR) | 1 | 1 | 0 | 2 |
| 7 | Switzerland (SUI) | 1 | 1 | 0 | 2 |
| 11 | Croatia (CRO) | 1 | 0 | 1 | 2 |
| 12 | Sweden (SWE) | 1 | 0 | 0 | 1 |
| 13 | Spain (ESP) | 0 | 1 | 3 | 4 |
| 14 | Poland (POL) | 0 | 1 | 1 | 2 |
| 14 | United States (USA) | 0 | 1 | 1 | 2 |
| 16 | Kyrgyzstan (KGZ) | 0 | 1 | 0 | 1 |
| 16 | Moldova (MLD) | 0 | 1 | 0 | 1 |
| 16 | Ukraine (UKR) | 0 | 1 | 0 | 1 |
| 19 | Chinese Taipei (TPE) | 0 | 0 | 1 | 1 |
| 19 | Cyprus (CYP) | 0 | 0 | 1 | 1 |
| 19 | Germany (GER) | 0 | 0 | 1 | 1 |
| 19 | Hungary (HUN) | 0 | 0 | 1 | 1 |
| 19 | Iran (IRI) | 0 | 0 | 1 | 1 |
| 19 | Turkey (TUR) | 0 | 0 | 1 | 1 |
| Totals (24 entries) | | 35 | 35 | 35 | 105 |
