= Hu Kai (sport shooter) =

Chinese sport shooter (born 2002)

Personal information
- Nationality: Chinese
- Born: 3 April 2002 (age 24) Anhui, China

Sport
- Sport: Shooting
- Event: 10 meter air pistol
Medal record
Men's shooting
Representing China
Event	1st	2nd	3rd
World Championships	3	1	1
Asian Games	1	1	0
Asian Championships	2	0	0
World University Games	2	1	0
Total	8	3	1
World Championships
Gold medal – first place	2025 Cairo	10 m air pistol mixed team
Gold medal – first place	2026 Doha	10 m air pistol
Gold medal – first place	2026 Doha	10 m air pistol team
Silver medal – second place	2025 Cairo	10 m air pistol
Bronze medal – third place	2026 Doha	10 m air pistol mixed team
Asian Championships
Gold medal – first place	2025 Shymkent	10 m air pistol
Gold medal – first place	2025 Shymkent	10 m air pistol team
Asian Games
Gold medal – first place	2026 Aichi-Nagoya	10 m air pistol team
Silver medal – second place	2026 Aichi-Nagoya	10 m air pistol
World University Games
Gold medal – first place	2021 Chengdu	10 m air pistol
Gold medal – first place	2021 Chengdu	10 m air pistol mixed team
Silver medal – second place	2021 Chengdu	10 m air pistol team

Hu Kai (Chinese: 胡凯; born 3 April 2002) is a Chinese sport shooter competing in the 10 meter air pistol event.

== Career ==
In August 2025, he competed at the 2025 Asian Shooting Championships and won gold medals in the 10 metre air pistol and 10 metre air pistol team event. In November 2025, he competed at the 2025 ISSF World Shooting Championships and won a gold medal in the 10 metre air pistol mixed team event and a silver medal in the 10 metre air pistol event. On 5 December 2025, during the opening ceremony for the 2025 ISSF World Cup final, he was named the best male pistol shooter.

In September 2026, he competed at the 2026 Asian Games and won a gold medal in the 10 metre air pistol team event, along with Bu Shuaihang and Xie Yu. This was China's first gold medal in the event at the Asian Games since 2006. He also won a silver medal in the 10 metre air pistol event. In November 2026, he competed at the 2026 ISSF World Shooting Championships and won a gold medal in the 10 metre air pistol and 10 metre air pistol team events. He also won a bronze medal in the 10 metre air pistol mixed team event, along with Yao Qianxun.
