= Shen Yiyao =

Chinese sport shooter (born 2004)

Personal information
- Nationality: Chinese
- Born: 8 May 2004 (age 22) Shanghai, China

Sport
- Sport: Shooting
- Event: 10 meter air pistol
Medal record
Women's shooting
Representing China
World Championships
Gold medal – first place	2026 Doha	10 m air pistol team
Gold medal – first place	2026 Doha	10 m air pistol mixed team
Asian Games
Gold medal – first place	2026 Aichi-Nagoya	10 m air pistol team
Silver medal – second place	2026 Aichi-Nagoya	10 m air pistol
Junior World Championships
Silver medal – second place	2022 Cairo	10 m air pistol team
Bronze medal – third place	2022 Cairo	10 m air pistol
Bronze medal – third place	2022 Cairo	10 m air pistol mixed team

Shen Yiyao (Chinese: 沈奕瑶; born 8 May 2004) is a Chinese sport shooter competing in the 10 meter air pistol event.

== Career ==
In September 2026, she competed at the 2026 Asian Games and won a gold medal in the 10 metre air pistol team event, along with Jiang Ranxin and Yao Qianxun. She also won a silver medal in the 10 metre air pistol event.

In November 2026, she competed at the 2026 ISSF World Shooting Championships and won a gold medal in the 10 metre air pistol team event. She also won a gold medal in the 10 metre air pistol mixed team event, along with Bu Shuaihang, with a score of 487.1 points.
