= Mitchell Iles =

Australian sport shooter

Mitchell Iles-Crevatin
Personal information
- Born: 25 March 1999 (age 27) Carlton, Victoria, Australia
- Height: 1.78 m (5 ft 10 in)
- Weight: 84 kg (185 lb)

Sport
- Sport: Sports shooting
- Events: Trap; Double Trap
- Coached by: Bill Iles

Mitchell Iles (born 25 March 1999) is an Australian sports shooter. He competed in the men's trap event at the 2016 Summer Olympics.

== Records ==
Current world records held in trap
Mixed Team	Qualification	149	Kayle Browning (USA); Brian Burrows (USA) Safiye Sariturk (TUR); Nedim Tolga Tuncer (TUR) Penny Smith (AUS); Mitchell Iles-Crevatin (AUS)	March 20, 2019 March 20, 2019 March 20, 2019	Guadalajara (MEX) Guadalajara (MEX) Guadalajara (MEX)
