= Kim Bo-mi (sport shooter) =

South Korean sport shooter

Personal information
- Nationality: South Korean
- Born: 11 October 1998 (age 28)

Sport
- Country: South Korea
- Sport: Shooting
- Event: Air pistol
Medal record
Women's shooting
Representing South Korea
World Championships
Silver medal – second place	2018 Changwon	10 m team air pistol
Bronze medal – third place	2018 Changwon	10 m air pistol
Bronze medal – third place	2025 Cairo	10 m air pistol team
Asian Games
Silver medal – second place	2026 Aichi–Nagoya	10 m air pistol team
Bronze medal – third place	2022 Hangzhou	Mixed 10 m air pistol team
Asian Championships
Gold medal – first place	2023 Changwon	10 m air pistol team
Silver medal – second place	2025 Shymkent	10m air pistol team
Bronze medal – third place	2023 Changwon	10 m air pistol mixed team
Asian Airgun Championships
Gold medal – first place	2022 Daegu	10 m air pistol team
Bronze medal – third place	2022 Daegu	10 m air pistol mixed team

Kim Bo-mi (born 11 October 1998) is a South Korean sport shooter.

She participated at the 2018 ISSF World Shooting Championships, winning a medal.
