= Yao Qianxun =

Chinese sport shooter (born 2005)

Personal information
- Nationality: Chinese
- Born: 13 March 2005 (age 21) Anhui, China

Sport
- Sport: Shooting
- Events: 10 meter air pistol, 25 meter pistol
Medal record
Women's shooting
Representing China
Event	1st	2nd	3rd
World Championships	7	3	1
Asian Games	1	1	0
Asian Championships	2	0	0
Junior World Championships	1	0	0
Total	11	4	1
Event	1st	2nd	3rd
10 meter air pistol	6	1	1
25 meter pistol	4	3	0
50 meter pistol	1	0	0
Total	11	4	1
World Championships
Gold medal – first place	2025 Cairo	10 m air pistol
Gold medal – first place	2025 Cairo	10 m air pistol team
Gold medal – first place	2025 Cairo	10 m air pistol mixed team
Gold medal – first place	2025 Cairo	25 m std pistol
Gold medal – first place	2025 Cairo	25 m std pistol team
Gold medal – first place	2025 Cairo	50 m pistol
Gold medal – first place	2026 Doha	10 m air pistol team
Silver medal – second place	2025 Cairo	25 m pistol
Silver medal – second place	2025 Cairo	25 m pistol team
Silver medal – second place	2026 Doha	10 m air pistol
Bronze medal – third place	2026 Doha	10 m air pistol mixed team
Asian Games
Gold medal – first place	2026 Aichi-Nagoya	10 m air pistol team
Silver medal – second place	2026 Aichi-Nagoya	25 m air pistol team
Asian Championships
Gold medal – first place	2025 Shymkent	10 m air pistol team
Gold medal – first place	2025 Shymkent	25 m air pistol team
Junior World Championships
Gold medal – first place	2022 Cairo	25 m air pistol team

Yao Qianxun (Chinese: 姚千寻; born 13 March 2005) is a Chinese sport shooter competing in the 10 meter and 25 meter pistol events.

== Career ==
In November 2025, Yao competed at the 2025 ISSF World Shooting Championships and won six gold medals. She won gold medals in the 10 metre air pistol, 10 metre air pistol team, 10 metre air pistol mixed team, 25 metre standard pistol, 25 metre standard pistol team, and 50 metre pistol events. She also won silver medals in the 25 meter pistol and 25 meter pistol team events. She set a world record in the 10 metre air pistol team with a score of 1693 points.

In September 2026, she competed at the 2026 Asian Games and won gold medals in the 10 metre air pistol and 25 metre air pistol team events. In November 2026, she competed at the 2026 ISSF World Shooting Championships and won a gold medal in the 10 metre air pistol team event, along with Jiang Ranxin and Shen Yiyao. She also won a silver medal in the 10 metre air pistol event. She then won a bronze medal in the 10 metre air pistol mixed team event, along with Hu Kai.
