= Bu Shuaihang =

Chinese sport shooter (born 2006)

Personal information
- Nationality: Chinese
- Born: 18 July 2006 (age 20) Henan, China

Sport
- Sport: Shooting
- Event: 10 meter air pistol
Medal record
Men's shooting
Representing China
World Championships
Gold medal – first place	2026 Doha	10 m air pistol team
Gold medal – first place	2026 Doha	10 m air pistol mixed team
Asian Games
Gold medal – first place	2026 Aichi-Nagoya	10 m air pistol team
Bronze medal – third place	2026 Aichi-Nagoya	10 m air pistol

Bu Shuaihang (Chinese: 布帅航; born 18 July 2006) is a Chinese sport shooter competing in the 10 meter air pistol event.

== Career ==
In September 2026, he competed at the 2026 Asian Games and won a gold medal in the 10 metre air pistol team event, along with Hu Kai and Xie Yu. This was China's first gold medal in the event at the Asian Games since 2006. He also won a bronze medal in the 10 metre air pistol event. In November 2026, he competed at the 2026 ISSF World Shooting Championships and won a gold medal in the 10 metre air pistol team event. He also won a gold medal in the 10 metre air pistol mixed team event, along with Shen Yiyao, with a score of 487.1 points.
