= Kim Song-guk =

Kim Song-guk may refer to:

- Kim Song-guk (boxer)
- Kim Song-guk (sport shooter)
