= Himanshu =

Given name

Himanshu is a given name. Notable people with the name include:

- Himanshu Asnora (born 1995), Indian cricketer
- Himanshu Bhatt actor who plays Mrityunjay Viswa karma in the film Login
- Himanshu Bisht (born 1996), Indian cricketer
- Himanshu Chawla (born 1991), Indian first-class cricketer
- Himanshu Dhanuka, Bengali film producer and distributor
- Himanshu Gulati (born 1988), Norwegian politician representing the Progress Party
- Himanshu Hari (born 1994), Indian cricketer
- Gajendra Prasad Himanshu (born 1942), veteran socialist leader from Bihar, India
- Himanshu Jangra (born 2004), Indian footballer
- Himanshu Khagta (born 1990), Indian photographer based in the Indian Himalayas
- Himanshu Malhotra (born 1982), Indian actor
- Himanshu Malik, Indian actor, screenwriter and producer known for his works in Bollywood
- Himanshu Mantri (born 1994), Indian cricketer
- Himanshu Pandya, Indian academic, Vice Chancellor of Gujarat University, Ahmedabad, Gujarat, India
- Himanshu Parikh (born 1951), Indian engineer
- Himanshu Rai (1892–1940), pioneer of Indian cinema, founder of the studio in 1934, along with Devika Rani
- Himanshu Rana (born 1998), Indian cricketer
- Himanshu Prabha Ray (born 1947), Sanskrit scholar, historian, and archaeologist
- Himanshu Roy (1963–2018), Indian police officer, Additional Director General of Police (ADGP) of Maharashtra
- Himanshu Sangwan (born 1995), Indian cricketer
- Himanshu Sharma (born 1981), Indian film writer and producer who works in Hindi cinema
- Himanshu Suri (born 1985), stage name Heems, American rapper from Queens in New York City
- Himanshu Thakur (born 1994), alpine skier from India
