= Himanshu Pandya =

Senior Professor, Botany Department of Gujarat University

Prof. Himanshu Pandya
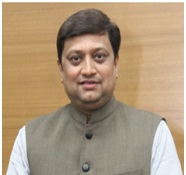

Himanshu Pandya is an Indian professor and academic at the Botany Department Gujarat University, Ahmedabad, Gujarat, India. He earned a MSc and PhD in botany and areas of specialization In vivo and In vitro studies on physiological and biochemical parameters on Gladiolus, Chrysanthemum and Lily.

== Career ==
Pandya taught for 30 years. He is also a senior professor and Head of the Department of Biochemistry and Forensic Science. His research focused on horticulture, plant biotechnology, plant physiology, plant biochemistry, bioinformatics, climate change and impacts management, forensic science, and biochemistry.

From 2005 - 2017 he was a Professor in the Department of Botany, Bioinformatics and Climate Change Impacts Management.

In 2017-2023 he was a Vice Chancellor of the Gujarat University.
