= Suruchi Singh =

Indian sports shooter (born 2006)

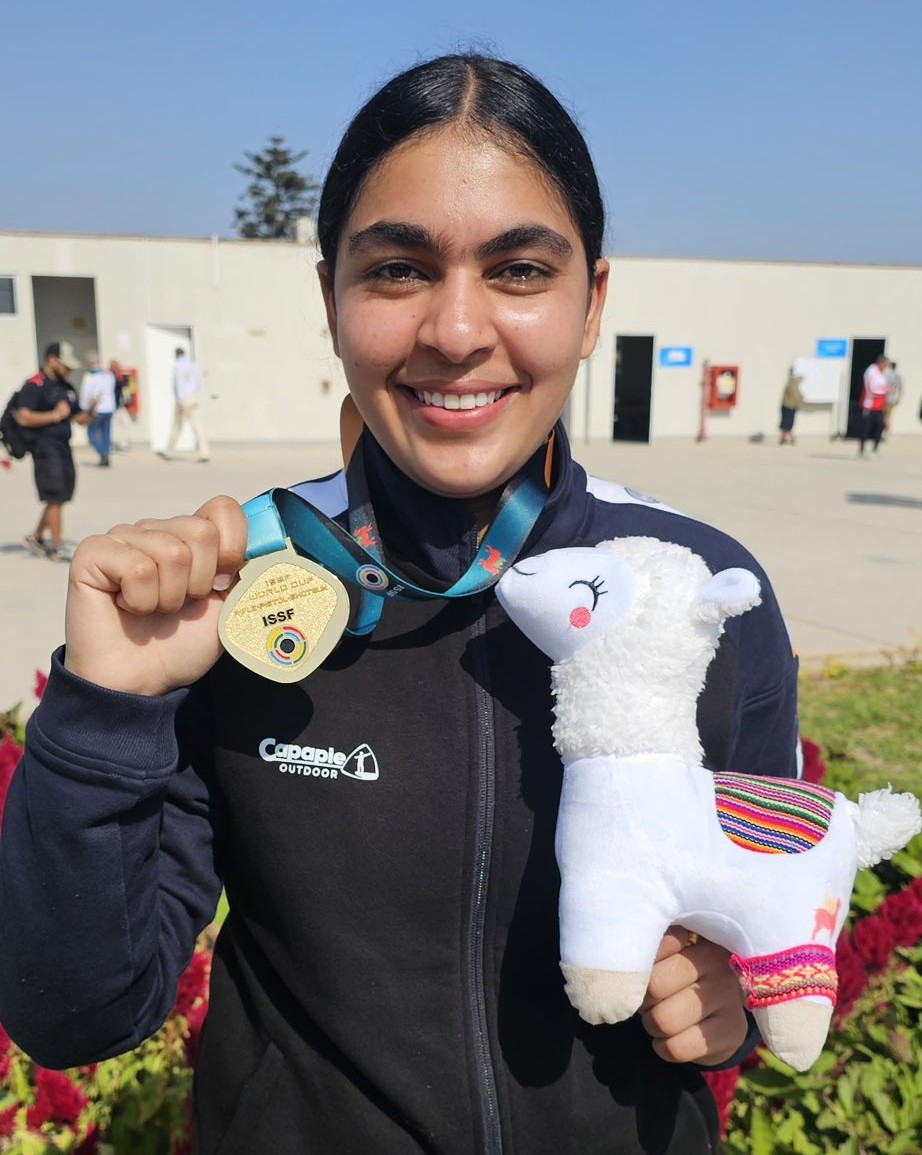
- Suruchi at the 2025 World Cup in Lima

Personal information
- Full name: Suruchi Inder Singh Phogat
- Born: 28 April 2006 (age 20) Sasroli, Haryana, India

Sport
- Sport: Shooting
- Event: 10 m air pistol

Achievements and titles
- Highest world ranking: 1 (2025)
- Personal bests: 245.1 WRJ (2025); 588 NR (2025)
Medal record
Women's 10 m air pistol shooting
Representing India
| Event | 1st | 2nd | 3rd |
|---|---|---|---|
| World Championships | 0 | 1 | 0 |
| World Cup Final | 1 | 0 | 0 |
| Asian Games | 1 | 0 | 0 |
| Asian Championships | 1 | 1 | 2 |
| World Cup | 5 | 0 | 1 |
| Junior World Cup | 0 | 1 | 1 |
| Total | 8 | 3 | 4 |
World Championships
| Silver medal – second place | 2025 Cairo | Team |
| Silver medal – second place | 2026 Doha | 10 m air pistol team |
World Cup Final
| Gold medal – first place | 2025 Doha | Individual |
Asian Games
| Gold medal – first place | 2026 Aichi–Nagoya | Mixed team |
Asian Championships
| Gold medal – first place | 2026 New Delhi | Team |
| Silver medal – second place | 2026 New Delhi | Mixed team |
| Bronze medal – third place | 2025 Shymkent | Mixed team |
| Bronze medal – third place | 2025 Shymkent | Team |
World Cup
| Gold medal – first place | 2025 Buenos Aires | Individual |
| Gold medal – first place | 2025 Munich | Individual |
| Gold medal – first place | 2025 Lima | Individual |
| Gold medal – first place | 2025 Lima | Mixed team |
| Gold medal – first place | 2026 Munich | Individual |
| Bronze medal – third place | 2025 Buenos Aires | Mixed team |
Junior World Cup
| Silver medal – second place | 2023 Suhl | Team |
| Bronze medal – third place | 2023 Suhl | Mixed team |

Suruchi Inder Singh Phogat (born 28 April 2006), also known as Suruchi Phogat, is an Indian sports shooter who specializes in the 10 m air pistol event. Singh gained international recognition by winning three back-to-back gold medals at the 2025 World Cup. She won the gold medal in the mixed 10 metre air pistol team event at the 2026 Asian Games, breaking the Games record during the finals.

== Early life ==
Suruchi was born in the Sasroli village of Jhajjar district in Haryana, into a family with a strong sporting lineage. Her father, Havildar Inder Singh, initially aspired for her to pursue wrestling, inspired by his neighbour, Virender Singh, a Deaflympics gold medalist. But she gravitated towards shooting and began her training aged 13 at the Guru Dronacharya Shooting Academy in Bhiwani under coach Suresh Singh. During the pandemic, she kept her practice going at a makeshift range.

== See also ==
- Shooting in India
