= Christian Elliott =

American sport shooter (born 1997)

Personal information
- Nationality: American
- Born: November 11, 1997 (age 28)

Sport
- Country: United States
- Sport: Shooting
- Event: Skeet
Medal record
Men's shooting
Representing the United States
World Championships
Gold medal – first place	2023 Baku	Skeet team
Silver medal – second place	2019 Lonato del Garda	Mixed team skeet
Silver medal – second place	2022 Osijek	Team skeet
Pan American Games
Gold medal – first place	2019 Lima	Skeet

Christian Elliott (born November 11, 1997) is an American sport shooter. He won the gold medal in the men's skeet event at the 2019 Pan American Games held in Lima, Peru.
