= Jiang Ranxin =

Chinese sport shooter (born 2000)

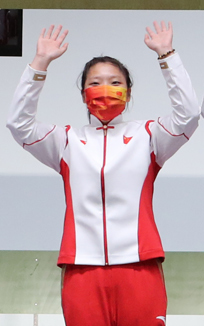
- Jiang at the 2020 Summer Olympics

Personal information
- Nationality: Chinese
- Born: 2 May 2000 (age 26) Fengxian District, Shanghai, China

Sport
- Country: China
- Sport: Shooting
- Events: AP60, SP
Medal record
Women's shooting
Representing China
Summer Olympics
Gold medal – first place	2020 Tokyo	10 m air pistol mixed team
Bronze medal – third place	2020 Tokyo	10 m air pistol
World Championships
Gold medal – first place	2018 Changwon	10 m team air pistol
Gold medal – first place	2018 Changwon	25 m team pistol
Gold medal – first place	2022 Cairo	10 m air pistol team
Gold medal – first place	2023 Baku	10 m air pistol
Gold medal – first place	2023 Baku	10m air pistol team
Gold medal – first place	2025 Cairo	10 m air pistol team
Gold medal – first place	2026 Doha	10m air pistol team
Gold medal – first place	2026 Doha	10m air pistol
Silver medal – second place	2023 Baku	50 m pistol team
Bronze medal – third place	2022 Cairo	10 m air pistol mixed team
Bronze medal – third place	2023 Baku	10 m air pistol mixed team
Asian Games
Gold medal – first place	2022 Hangzhou	10 m air pistol team
Gold medal – first place	2022 Hangzhou	10 m air pistol mixed team
Gold medal – first place	2026 Aichi–Nagoya	10 m air pistol team
Bronze medal – third place	2026 Aichi–Nagoya	10 m air pistol
Asian Championships
Silver medal – second place	2019 Doha	10 m air pistol team
Silver medal – second place	2023 Changwon	10 m air pistol
Bronze medal – third place	2019 Doha	10 m air pistol
Bronze medal – third place	2023 Changwon	10 m air pistol team

Jiang Ranxin (born 2 May 2000) is a Chinese sport shooter.

She participated at the 2018 ISSF World Shooting Championships, winning a medal.

She qualified to represent China at the 2020 Summer Olympics. where she won the gold medal in mixed 10 metre air pistol team in the event's debut on the Olympic stage. She also won the bronze medal in women's 10 metre air pistol.

Current world records held in 10 meter air pistol
Women	Teams	1739	China (Jiang, Wang, Ji)	September 4, 2018	Changwon (KOR)

== Career ==
=== 2017 ===
In 2017, Jiang Ranxin was selected for the Chinese national shooting team.

=== 2018 ===
In September 2018, at the 52nd World Shooting Championships, Jiang Ranxin, Lin Yuemei and Yao Yushi won the women's 10m air pistol team championship and the women's 25m pistol team championship.

=== 2019 ===
On February 27, 2019, in the 10m air pistol mixed team competition of the 2019 Shooting World Cup India Station, Jiang Ranxin and Zhang Bowen won the runner-up with 477.7 points. In the women's 10m air pistol competition, Jiang Ranxin performed poorly and scored 568 points, ranking 36th and missed the final. On August 13, Jiang Ranxin and Zhu Yinxin won the runner-up in the 10-meter air pistol mixed team competition at the 2nd Youth Games of the People's Republic of China. In September, Jiang Ranxin enlisted in the army and served in the Bayi Shooting Team of the Military Sports Training Center. In December, Jiang Ranxin was named an international athlete by the General Administration of Sport of China.

=== 2020 ===
On September 29, 2020, in the 2020 National Shooting Championships (pistol event), Jiang Ranxin won the runner-up in the women's 10m air pistol event, and won fourth place in the 10m air pistol mixed team with Pang Wei. In December 2020, due to the military organizational reform, Jiang Ranxin retired from active service ahead of schedule.

=== 2021 ===
On February 1, 2021, Jiang Ranxin won the runner-up in the women's 10m air pistol competition of the Chinese National Shooting Team's final team selection for the Tokyo Olympics (first game). She also won the 10m air pistol mixed team championship. On March 13, in the women's 10m air pistol competition of the Chinese National Shooting Team's final team selection for the Tokyo Olympics (the third game), Jiang Ranxin won the championship with a score of 244.5. On March 23, in the women's 10m air pistol competition of the Chinese National Shooting Team's Tokyo Olympic Games final team selection (fourth round), Jiang Ranxin won the championship with a score of 243.8. After the four selection rounds, Jiang Ranxin won the qualification for the Tokyo Olympics with the first place in the total score. On July 25, in the qualifying round of the women's 10-meter air pistol event at the Tokyo Olympics, Jiang Ranxin scored 587 points and ranked first, breaking the Olympic record for the qualifying round of this event. In the following final, Jiang Ranxin won the bronze medal with a score of 218.0. On July 27, in the 2020 Tokyo Olympics 10m air pistol mixed team final, Jiang Ranxin and Pang Wei defeated the Russian combination Basarashkina/Chernowsov with a total score of 16:14 and won the championship. This is also the first mixed shooting team gold medal in the history of the Chinese Olympics. On September 14, in the women's 10-meter air pistol final of the 14th National Games of the People's Republic of China, Jiang Ranxin won the runner-up with a score of 239.6. In November, she won a bronze medal in the ISSF President's Cup women's 10m air pistol competition.
