= ISSF Junior World Cup =

International Shooting Sport Federation junior competition

The ISSF World Cup was introduced by the International Shooting Sport Federation in 2016 to provide an equivalent competition to the ISSF World Cup, but for junior shooters. It covers a variety of both Olympic and non-Olympic events in rifle, pistol and shotgun, and covers one or two competitions per year in each event. Unlike in the senior version of the event, there is currently no junior world cup final.

Under the 2023 ISSF rules, an athlete ceases to be a 'junior' on December 31 of the year they turn 21. This means they can still participate in Junior events for that year, even if they turned 21 on January 1st. Previous rules had defined a junior as an athlete who would be under the age of 21 on December 31st of the competition year, meaning they could not compete as a junior in that year even before their birthday.

== Editions ==
The venues are decided by the ISSF from time to time. However, some are more common than others. Save for the 2017 world cup, Suhl in Germany has hosted a competition every year. Other stages of the competition have been held both in and out of Europe: for example in Porpetto, Gabala and Sydney.

Edition	Year	Leg 1	Leg 2
1	2015	Suhl (GER)	
2	2016	Suhl (GER)	Gabala (AZE)
3	2017	Porpetto (ITA)	
4	2018	Sydney (AUS)	Suhl (GER)
5	2019	Suhl (GER)	
6	2022	Suhl (GER)	
7	2023	Suhl (GER)	
8	2024	Granada (ESP)	
9	2025	Suhl (GER)	New Delhi (IND)
10	2026	Cairo (EGY)	Lonato del Garda (ITA)

Note that the 2017 world cup consisted of only shotgun events, as the Junior World Championships of the same year covered rifle and pistol events.

== Events ==
The following events have all featured in the ISSF Junior World Cup in recent years:

=== Rifle ===
- 10 meter air rifle
- 50 meter rifle prone
- 50 meter rifle three positions

=== Pistol ===
- 10 meter air pistol
- 25 meter pistol
- 25 meter standard pistol
- 25 meter rapid fire pistol
- 50 meter pistol

=== Shotgun ===
- Trap
- Double trap
- Skeet

== Medal table ==
Rank	Country	Gold	Silver	Bronze	Total
1	India	61	42	50	153
2	China	28	30	24	82
3	Italy	24	19	24	67
4	Russia	23	23	16	62
5	Germany	10	9	9	28
6	Norway	7	4	2	13
7	Hungary	3	2	3	8
8	France	3	13	7	23
9	Australia	3	10	8	21
10	Czech Republic	6	7	5	18
11	Poland	2	0	2	4
12	United States	9	6	2	17
13	Finland	2	4	0	6
14	Turkey	2	1	4	7
15	Switzerland	1	1	2	4
16	Greece	1	1	0	2
17	Denmark	2	0	0	2
17	Kazakhstan	1	0	0	1
17	Kyrgyzstan	1	0	0	1
17	Iran	1	0	0	1
17	Malta	1	0	0	1
20	Singapore	0	3	3	6
21	Thailand	1	2	7	10
22	Latvia	1	2	1	4
22	Japan	0	1	1	2
22	Ukraine	0	3	5	8
25	Cyprus	0	1	0	1
25	Bulgaria	1	2	2	5
25	United Kingdom	2	3	2	7
28	Qatar	0	0	2	2
29	Croatia	0	0	1	1
29	Egypt	0	0	1	1
29	Georgia	1	1	3	5
29	Romania	0	0	1	1
29	Uzbekistan	0	0	1	1
29	Sweden	0	0	1	1
35	Spain	2	0	1	3
36	Belarus	1	4	1	6
37	Slovenia	1	0	0	1
38	Austria	1	2	3	3
39	Chinese Taipei	0	3	2	5
40	South Korea	0	1	2	3
Total	40	70	70	70	210
