= Porpetto =

Porpetto Porpêt (Friulian)
- Comune
- Comune di Porpetto
- Location within Italy Location within Friuli-Venezia Giulia
- Coordinates: 45°51′N 13°13′E
- Country: Italy
- Region: Friuli-Venezia Giulia
- Province: Udine (UD)
- Frazioni: Castello, Corgnolo, Pampaluna

Area
  - Total: 19.7 km^{2} (7.6 sq mi)
- Elevation: 10 m (33 ft)

Population (Dec. 2004)
  - Total: 2,717
  - Density: 138/km^{2} (357/sq mi)
- Demonym: Porpettesi
- Time zone: UTC+1 (CET)
  - Summer (DST): UTC+2 (CEST)
- Postal code: 33050
- Dialing code: 0431
- Website: Official website

Porpetto (Friulian: Porpêt) is a comune (municipality) in the Regional decentralization entity of Udine in the Italian region of Friuli-Venezia Giulia, located about 50 kilometres (31 mi) northwest of Trieste and about 25 kilometres (16 mi) south of Udine. As of 31 December 2004, it had a population of 2,717 and an area of 19.7 square kilometres (7.6 mi^{2}).

The municipality of Porpetto contains the frazioni (boroughs) of Castello, Corgnolo, Foredana and Pampaluna. The river Corno crosses the city.

Porpetto borders the following municipalities: Castions di Strada, Gonars, San Giorgio di Nogaro, Torviscosa.

== Demographic evolution ==
Historical population

| Year | Pop. | ±% |
|---|---|---|
| 1861 | ? | — |
| 1871 | 1,756 | — |
| 1881 | 1,663 | −5.3% |
| 1901 | 1,902 | +14.4% |
| 1911 | 2,369 | +24.6% |

| Year | Pop. | ±% |
|---|---|---|
| 1921 | 2,503 | +5.7% |
| 1931 | 2,614 | +4.4% |
| 1936 | 2,520 | −3.6% |
| 1951 | 3,069 | +21.8% |
| 1961 | 2,813 | −8.3% |

| Year | Pop. | ±% |
|---|---|---|
| 1971 | 2,581 | −8.2% |
| 1981 | 2,727 | +5.7% |
| 1991 | 2,665 | −2.3% |
| 2001 | 2,683 | +0.7% |

Source: Data from ISTAT
