= Rohru =

- city
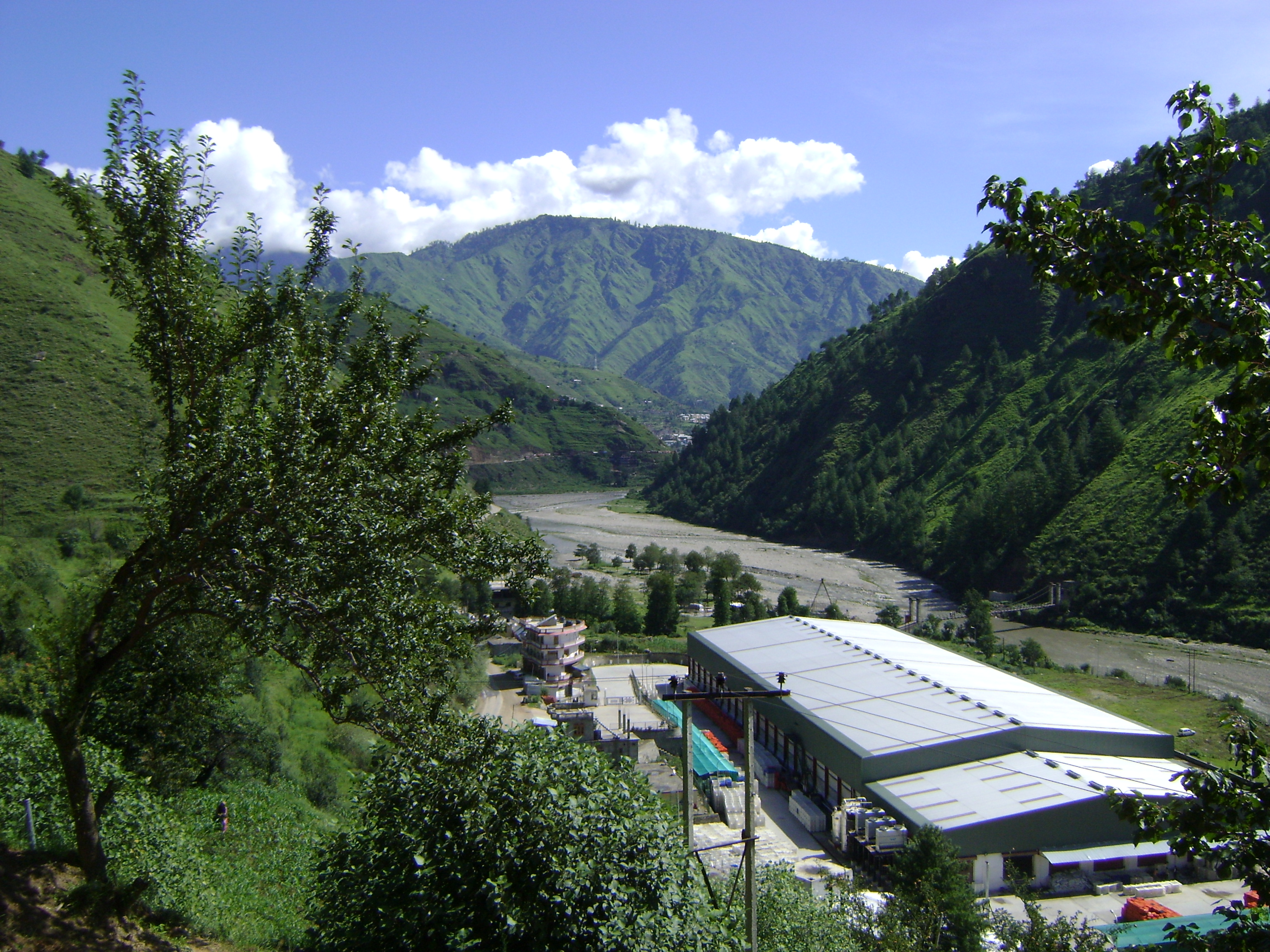
- Rohru city the banks of Pabbar river

- Location in Himachal Pradesh, India Rohru (India)
- Coordinates: 31.202°N 77.752°E
- Country: India
- State: Himachal Pradesh
- District: Shimla
- Established: 19 January 2001
- Elevation: 1,554 m (5,098 ft)

Population (2011)
  - Total: 6,875

Languages
  - Official: Hindi
  - Native: Mahasui (Soracholi)
- Time zone: UTC+5:30 (IST)
- PIN: 171207
- Vehicle registration: HP-10

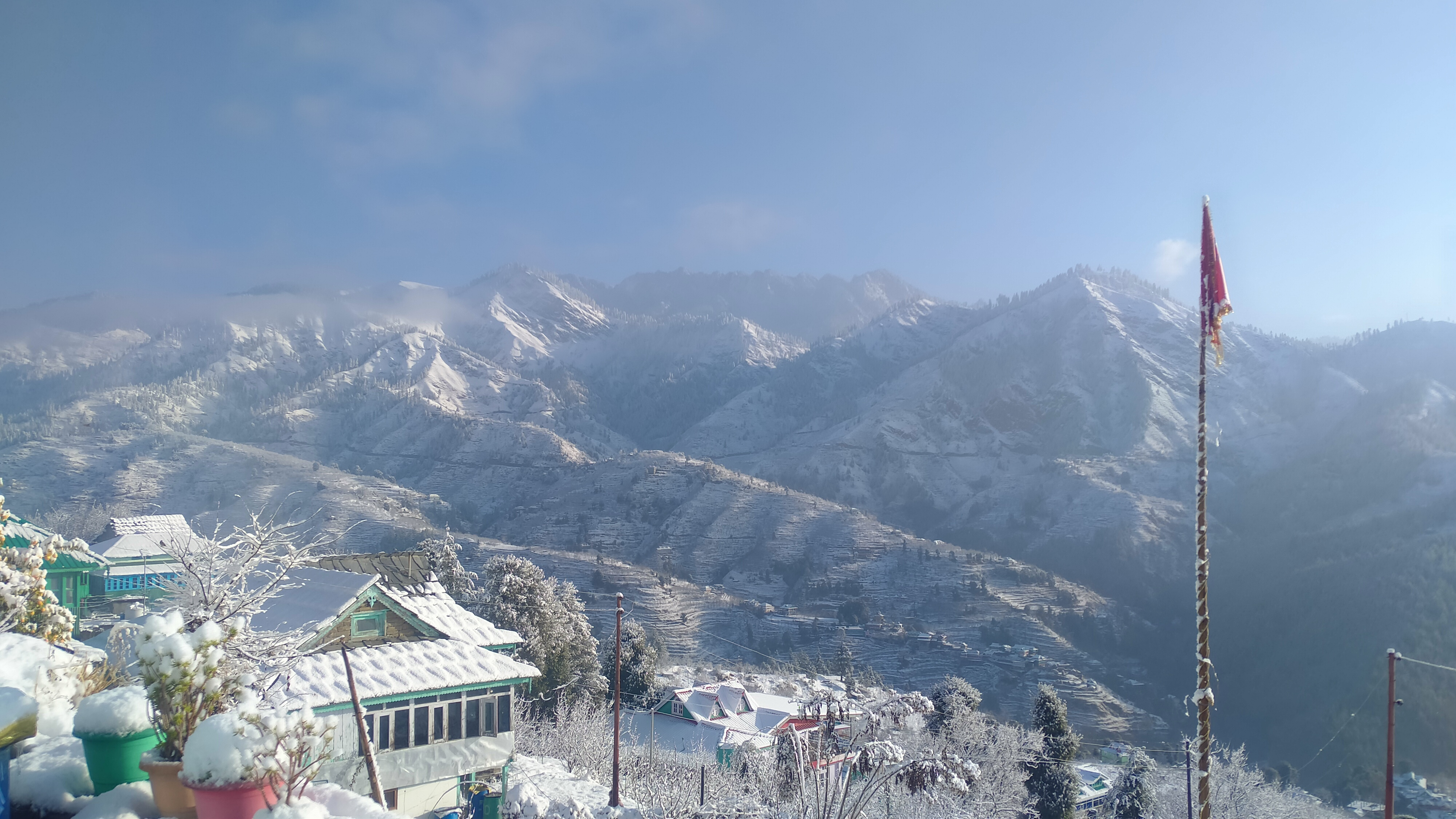
View of Mandalgarh Valley, Rohru

Rohru is a town and a municipal committee in Shimla district in the Indian state of Himachal Pradesh. It is at the banks of the Pabbar River, and it is about 115 km from Shimla city. Rohru is at 31.202°N 77.7519°E. It has an average elevation of 1,525 metres (5,003 feet).

The Ganasidhar-Sungri road was formerly part of the Hindustan Tibet Road and is renamed as State Highway 1. It is an important lifeline for high altritude villages like Khadrala.

== Demographics ==
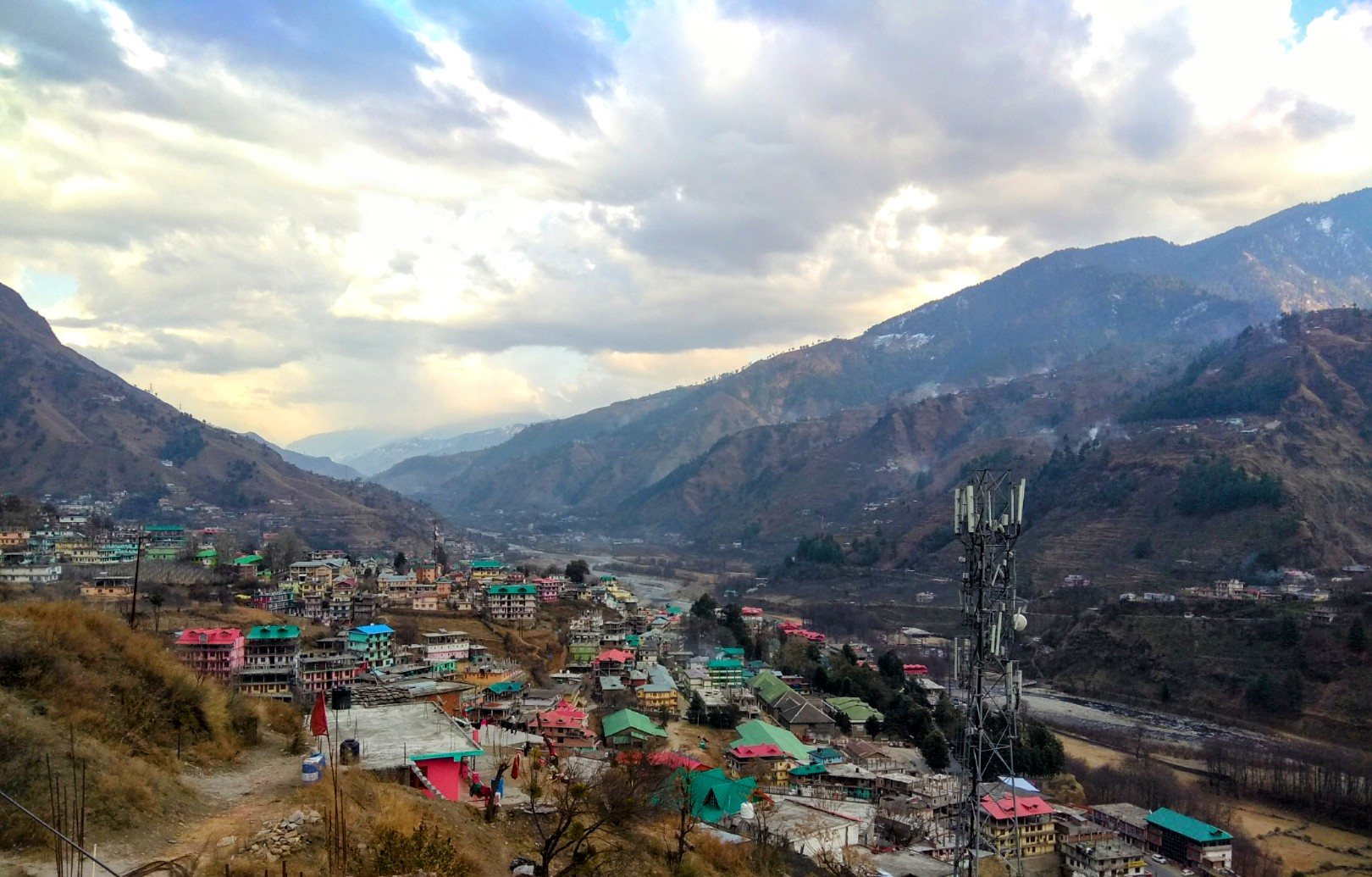
Rohru

As of 2010 India census, Rohru had a population of 14,953. Males constitute 59% of the population and females 41%. Rohru has an average literacy rate of 94%, much higher than the national average of 59.5%: male literacy is 96%, and female literacy is 89%. In Rohru, 13% of the population is under 6 years of age.
