= Shooting at the 2024 Summer Olympics – Qualification =

This article details the qualifying phase for shooting at the 2024 Summer Olympics. 300 quota places for the Games were entitled to the shooters coming from their respective National Olympic Committees (NOCs), based on the results at designated ISSF supervised Championships subjected to the ISSF rules from 14 August 2022 to 9 June 2024. Host nation France has been guaranteed twelve quota places with one in each of the individual events. Highest-ranked shooter, who has not qualified yet or whose NOC does not have more than one berth in the respective event, will obtain a direct Olympic quota place through the World Rankings. The remaining sixteen quota places are available to the eligible NOCs under the Tripartite Commission Invitation to attain a maximum number of 340.

== Timeline ==
Event	Date	Venue
2022 European Shotgun Championships	August 24 – September 12, 2022	(Cyprus) Larnaca
2022 European Championships 25m & 50m events	September 5–18, 2022	(Poland) Wrocław
2022 ISSF World Shotgun Championships	September 19 – October 12, 2022	(Croatia) Osijek
2022 ISSF World Shooting Championships	October 12–25, 2022	(Egypt) Cairo
2022 Shooting Championships of the Americas	November 6–13, 2022	(Peru) Lima
2023 European Championships 10m events	March 5–15, 2023	(Estonia) Tallinn
2023 European Games	June 21 – July 2, 2023	(Poland) Kraków
2023 ISSF World Shooting Championships	August 14–31, 2023	(Azerbaijan) Baku
2023 European Shotgun Championships	September 8–27, 2023	(Croatia) Osijek
2023 African Shooting Championships	October 1–10, 2023	(Egypt) Cairo
2023 Pan American Games	October 21–27, 2023	(Chile) Santiago
2023 Asian Shooting Championships	October 22 – November 2, 2023	(South Korea) Changwon
2023 Oceania Shooting Championships	October 30 – November 6, 2023	(Australia) Brisbane
2024 Asian Shooting Championships (rifle & pistol)	January 5–18, 2024	(Indonesia) Jakarta
2024 Asian Shooting Championships (shotgun)	January 12–23, 2024	Kuwait City
2024 European 10 m Events Championships	February 24 – March 3, 2024	(Hungary) Győr
2024 Shooting Championships of the Americas (shotgun)	February 29 – March 9, 2024	(Dominican Republic) Santo Domingo
2024 Shooting Championships of the Americas (rifle & pistol)	March 31 – April 7, 2024	(Argentina) Buenos Aires
2024 ISSF World Olympic Qualification Tournament (rifle & pistol)	April 11–19, 2024	(Brazil) Rio de Janeiro
2024 ISSF World Olympic Qualification Tournament (shotgun)	April 19–29, 2024	(Qatar) Doha
2024 European Shotgun Championships	May 15–27, 2024	(Italy) Lonato
2024 European Championships 25m & 50m events	May 23 – June 9, 2024	(Croatia) Osijek
ISSF World Olympic Rankings	June 9, 2024	—
Re-allocation of unused quota places	June 28, 2024	—

== Qualification summary ==
Nation	Men						Women						Total	
Nation	FR 3x40	AR 60	RFP	AP 60	TR 125	SK 125	R 3x40	AR 60W	SP	AP 60W	TR 125W	SK 125W	Events	Athletes (Quotas)
Albania									1	1			2	1
Algeria		1		1				1					3	3
Argentina		1				1		1					3	3
Armenia										1			1	1
Aruba				1									1	1
Australia	2	2	1		2	1			1	1	2	1	13	10
Austria	2	2					1	1	1	1			8	5
Azerbaijan			1	1									2	1
Bangladesh		1											1	1
Brazil				1			1	1				1	4	3
Bulgaria				1					1	1			3	2
Canada	1	1		1			1						4	3
Chile				1								1	2	2
China	2	2	2	2	2	1	2	2	2	2	2	2	23	21
Croatia	2	2			1								5	3
Cuba			2				1	1	1	1			6	4
Cyprus												1	1	1
Czech Republic	2	2	2	1	1	1	1	1				1	12	9
Denmark						1	2	2					5	3
Dominican Republic					1								1	1
Ecuador									2	2			4	2
Egypt	1	2	1			2		2	1	2	1	1	13	11
El Salvador	1	1											2	1
Estonia			1			1							2	2
Finland	1					1					1		3	3
France	2	2	2	1	1	1	1	2	2	1	2	1	18	15
Georgia									1				1	1
Germany	1	1	2	2		1	2	2	2		1	2	16	13
Great Britain	1	1			2		1	1			1	1	8	6
Greece						2			1	2		1	6	5
Guatemala					1	1					2		4	4
Hungary	2	2					1	1	2	2			10	5
Iceland						1							1	1
India	2	2	2	2	1	1	2	2	2	2	2	2	22	21
Individual Neutral Athletes							1		1				2	2
Indonesia	1	1											2	1
Iran					1			2	1	1			5	4
Israel		1											1	1
Italy	2	2	2	2	2	2	1	1			2	2	17	15
Japan	1	1	1				1						4	3
Kazakhstan	2	2	1	1		1	2	2		1	1	1	14	9
Kuwait					1	1							2	2
Latvia				1					1	1			3	2
Lebanon											1		1	1
Libya				1									1	1
Malaysia				1									1	1
Malta					1								1	1
Mexico	1	2						1	1	1		1	7	5
Moldova										1			1	1
Mongolia	1		1	1			1						4	3
Morocco					1								1	1
Nepal								1					1	1
New Zealand					1							1	2	2
Nicaragua								1					1	1
North Macedonia								1					1	1
Norway	2	2				1	2	2					9	6
Oman					1								1	1
Pakistan			1	1					1	1			4	3
Palestine						1							1	1
Peru						1						1	2	2
Poland	2	2					2	2	1	1			10	7
Portugal											1		1	1
Puerto Rico							1	1					2	1
Qatar					1	1							2	2
Refugee Olympic Team				1				1					2	2
San Marino											1		1	1
Serbia	1	1		1						1			4	3
Singapore									1	1			2	1
Slovakia	1	1		1	1						1	2	7	6
South Korea	1	2	2	2		1	2	2	2	2	2	1	19	16
Spain					2						2		4	4
Sweden	2	2			1	2			1			1	9	7
Switzerland	1			1			2	2					6	5
Chinese Taipei					1	1			2	1	2		7	8
Thailand	1								2	2			5	3
Tunisia										1			1	1
Turkey				1	1				2	2	1	1	8	7
Ukraine	1	1	2	1					1	1		1	8	6
United States	2	2	2		2	2	2	2	2	2	2	2	22	17
Venezuela			1		1								2	2
Vietnam								1	1	1			3	2
Yemen										1			1	1
Total: 81 NOCs	44	48	29	33	30	30	32	43	40	44	30	29	432	342

== 50 m rifle three positions men ==
Event	Places	Nation	Qualified athlete	Announced competitor
2022 European Championships 25m & 50m events	2	Norway	Jon-Hermann Hegg	Jon-Hermann Hegg
2022 European Championships 25m & 50m events	2	Czech Republic	Petr Nymburský	Petr Nymburský
2022 World Rifle & Pistol Championships	4	Ukraine	Serhiy Kulish	Serhiy Kulish
2022 World Rifle & Pistol Championships	4	Poland	Tomasz Bartnik	Tomasz Bartnik
2022 World Rifle & Pistol Championships	4	India	Swapnil Kusale	Swapnil Kusale
2022 World Rifle & Pistol Championships	4	China	Liu Yukun	Liu Yukun
2022 Championships of the Americas	1	United States	Ivan Roe	Ivan Roe
2023 European Games	1	Hungary	Zalán Pekler	Zalán Pekler
2023 World Championships	4	Austria	Alexander Schmirl	Alexander Schmirl
2023 World Championships	4	Finland	Aleksi Leppä	Aleksi Leppä
2023 World Championships	4	India	Akhil Sheoran	Aishwary Pratap Singh Tomar
2023 World Championships	4	Switzerland	Christoph Dürr	Christoph Dürr
2023 African Championships	1	Egypt	Ibrahim Korayiem	Ibrahim Korayiem
2023 Pan American Games	1	Mexico	Carlos Quezada	Carlos Quezada
2023 Asian Championships	2	China	Tian Jiaming	Du Linshu
2023 Asian Championships	2	Kazakhstan	Konstantin Malinovskiy	Konstantin Malinovskiy
2023 Oceania Championships	1	Australia	Dane Sampson	Dane Sampson
2023 Oceania Championships	1	New Zealand	Shaun Harold Jeffrey	
2024 Asian Rifle & Pistol Championships	2	Thailand	Thongphaphum Vongsukdee	Thongphaphum Vongsukdee
2024 Asian Rifle & Pistol Championships	2	Mongolia	Nyantain Bayaraa	Nyantain Bayaraa
2024 Championships of the Americas	1	Canada	Tye Ikeda	Tye Ikeda
2024 ISSF World Qualification Tournament	2	Norway	Ole Martin Halvorsen	Ole Martin Halvorsen
2024 ISSF World Qualification Tournament	2	Great Britain	Michael Bargeron	Michael Bargeron
2024 European Championships 25m & 50m events	2	France	Lucas Kryzs	Lucas Kryzs
2024 European Championships 25m & 50m events	2	Croatia	Miran Maričić	Miran Maričić
ISSF World Olympic Rankings	3	France	—N/a	Romain Aufrère
ISSF World Olympic Rankings	3	Austria	—N/a	Andreas Thum
ISSF World Olympic Rankings	3	Sweden	—N/a	Marcus Madsen
Universality place	1	El Salvador	—N/a	Israel Gutiérrez
Athletes qualified for other events	16	Australia	—N/a	Jack Rossiter
Athletes qualified for other events	16	Croatia	—N/a	Petar Gorša
Athletes qualified for other events	16	Czech Republic	—N/a	Jiří Přívratský
Athletes qualified for other events	16	Germany	—N/a	Maximilian Ulbrich
Athletes qualified for other events	16	Hungary	—N/a	István Péni
Athletes qualified for other events	16	Indonesia	—N/a	Fathur Gustafian
Athletes qualified for other events	16	Italy	—N/a	Edoardo Bonazzi
Athletes qualified for other events	16	Italy	—N/a	Danilo Sollazzo
Athletes qualified for other events	16	Japan	—N/a	Naoya Okada
Athletes qualified for other events	16	Kazakhstan	—N/a	Islam Satpayev
Athletes qualified for other events	16	Poland	—N/a	Maciej Kowalewicz
Athletes qualified for other events	16	Serbia	—N/a	Lazar Kovačević
Athletes qualified for other events	16	Slovakia	—N/a	Patrik Jány
Athletes qualified for other events	16	South Korea	—N/a	Park Ha-jun
Athletes qualified for other events	16	Sweden	—N/a	Victor Lindgren
Athletes qualified for other events	16	United States	—N/a	Rylan Kissell
Total	44			

== 10 m air rifle men ==
Event	Places	Nation	Qualified athlete	Announced competitor
2022 World Rifle & Pistol Championships	4	Italy	Danilo Sollazzo	Danilo Sollazzo
2022 World Rifle & Pistol Championships	4	India	Rudrankksh Patil	Sandeep Singh
2022 World Rifle & Pistol Championships	4	China	Sheng Lihao	Sheng Lihao
2022 World Rifle & Pistol Championships	4	Czech Republic	Jiří Přívratský	Jiří Přívratský
2022 Championships of the Americas	1	United States	Brandon Muske	Rylan Kissell
2023 European Championships 10m events	2	Germany	Maximilian Ulbrich	Maximilian Ulbrich
2023 European Championships 10m events	2	Slovakia	Patrik Jány	Patrik Jány
2023 European Games	1	Austria	Martin Strempfl	Martin Strempfl
2023 World Championships	4	China	Yang Haoran	Du Linshu
2023 World Championships	4	Czech Republic	František Smetana	František Smetana
2023 World Championships	4	Kazakhstan	Islam Satpayev	Islam Satpayev
2023 World Championships	4	Sweden	Victor Lindgren	Victor Lindgren
2023 African Championships	2	Egypt	Mohamed Hamdy Abdelkader	Mohamed Hamdy Abdelkader
2023 African Championships	2	Algeria	Koceila Adoul	Koceila Adoul
2023 Pan American Games	1	Mexico	Edson Ramírez	Edson Ramírez
2023 Asian Championships	2	India	Arjun Babuta	Arjun Babuta
2023 Asian Championships	2	Japan	Naoya Okada	Naoya Okada
2023 Oceania Championships	1	Australia	Jack Rossiter	Jack Rossiter
2024 Asian Rifle & Pistol Championships	2	South Korea	Choe Dae-han	Choe Dae-han
2024 Asian Rifle & Pistol Championships	2	Indonesia	Fathur Gustafian	Fathur Gustafian
2024 European Championships 10m events	2	Hungary	István Péni	István Péni
2024 European Championships 10m events	2	Poland	Maciej Kowalewicz	Maciej Kowalewicz
2024 Championships of the Americas	1	Argentina	Marcelo Gutiérrez	Marcelo Gutiérrez
2024 ISSF World Qualification Tournament	2	Serbia	Lazar Kovačević	Lazar Kovačević
2024 ISSF World Qualification Tournament	2	Italy	Edoardo Bonazzi	Edoardo Bonazzi
ISSF World Olympic Rankings	3	South Korea	—N/a	Park Ha-jun
ISSF World Olympic Rankings	3	Israel	—N/a	Sergey Richter
ISSF World Olympic Rankings	3	Croatia	—N/a	Petar Gorša
Universality places	1	Bangladesh	—N/a	Muhammad Robiul Islam
Athletes qualified for other events	19	Australia	—N/a	Dane Sampson
Athletes qualified for other events	19	Austria	—N/a	Alexander Schmirl
Athletes qualified for other events	19	Canada	—N/a	Tye Ikeda
Athletes qualified for other events	19	Croatia	—N/a	Miran Maričić
Athletes qualified for other events	19	Egypt	—N/a	Ibrahim Korayiem
Athletes qualified for other events	19	El Salvador	—N/a	Israel Gutiérrez
Athletes qualified for other events	19	Finland	—N/a	Aleksi Leppä
Athletes qualified for other events	19	France	—N/a	Romain Aufrère
Athletes qualified for other events	19	France	—N/a	Lucas Kryzs
Athletes qualified for other events	19	Great Britain	—N/a	Michael Bargeron
Athletes qualified for other events	19	Hungary	—N/a	Zalán Pekler
Athletes qualified for other events	19	Kazakhstan	—N/a	Konstantin Malinovskiy
Athletes qualified for other events	19	Mexico	—N/a	Carlos Quezada
Athletes qualified for other events	19	Norway	—N/a	Ole Martin Halvorsen
Athletes qualified for other events	19	Norway	—N/a	Jon-Hermann Hegg
Athletes qualified for other events	19	Poland	—N/a	Tomasz Bartnik
Athletes qualified for other events	19	Sweden	—N/a	Marcus Madsen
Athletes qualified for other events	19	Ukraine	—N/a	Serhiy Kulish
Athletes qualified for other events	19	United States	—N/a	Ivan Roe
Total	48			

== 25 m rapid fire pistol men ==
Event	Places	Nation	Qualified athlete	Announced competitor
2022 European Championships 25m & 50m events	2	France	Clément Bessaguet	Clément Bessaguet
2022 European Championships 25m & 50m events	2	Germany	Oliver Geis	Florian Peter
2022 World Rifle & Pistol Championships	4	South Korea	Lee Gun-hyeok	Cho Yeong-jae
2022 World Rifle & Pistol Championships	4	Pakistan	Ghulam Mustafa Bashir	Ghulam Mustafa Bashir
2022 World Rifle & Pistol Championships	4	Germany	Christian Reitz	Christian Reitz
2022 World Rifle & Pistol Championships	4	China	Lu Zhiming	Wang Xinjie
2022 Championships of the Americas	1	Cuba	Leuris Pupo	Leuris Pupo
2023 European Games	1	Czech Republic	Martin Podhráský	Martin Podhráský
2023 World Championships	4	China	Li Yuehong	Li Yuehong
2023 World Championships	4	Japan	Dai Yoshioka	Dai Yoshioka
2023 World Championships	4	Ukraine	Denys Kushnirov	Pavlo Korostylov
2023 World Championships	4	Estonia	Peeter Olesk	Peeter Olesk
2023 African Championships	1	Egypt	Omar Mohamed	Omar Mohamed
2023 Pan American Games	2	Venezuela	Douglas Gómez	Douglas Gómez
2023 Pan American Games	2	United States	Henry Leverett	Henry Leverett
2023 Asian Championships	2	India	Anish Bhanwala	Anish Bhanwala
2023 Asian Championships	2	South Korea	Song Jong-ho	Song Jong-ho
2023 Oceania Championships	1	Australia	Scott Anderson	Sergei Evglevski
2024 Asian Rifle & Pistol Championships	2	Kazakhstan	Nikita Chiryukin	Nikita Chiryukin
2024 Asian Rifle & Pistol Championships	2	India	Vijayveer Sidhu	Vijayveer Sidhu
2024 Championships of the Americas	1	Cuba	Jorge Álvarez	Jorge Álvarez
2024 ISSF World Qualification Tournament	2	France	Jean Quiquampoix	Jean Quiquampoix
2024 ISSF World Qualification Tournament	2	United States	Keith Sanderson	Keith Sanderson
2024 European Championships 25m & 50m events	2	Ukraine	Maksym Horodynets	Maksym Horodynets
2024 European Championships 25m & 50m events	2	Italy	Riccardo Mazzetti	Riccardo Mazzetti
ISSF World Olympic Rankings^{[a]}	2	Czech Republic	—N/a	Matěj Rampula
ISSF World Olympic Rankings^{[a]}	2	Italy	—N/a	Massimo Spinella
Athletes qualified for other events	2	Azerbaijan	—N/a	Ruslan Lunev
Athletes qualified for other events	2	Mongolia	—N/a	Enkhtaivany Davaakhüü
Total	29			

== 10 m air pistol men ==
Event	Places	Nation	Qualified athlete	Announced competitor
Host nation	1	France	—N/a	Florian Fouquet
2022 World Rifle & Pistol Championships	4	China	Liu Jinyao	Xie Yu
2022 World Rifle & Pistol Championships	4	Ukraine	Pavlo Korostylov	Pavlo Korostylov
2022 World Rifle & Pistol Championships	4	South Korea	Lee Won-ho	Lee Won-ho
2022 World Rifle & Pistol Championships	4	Pakistan	Gulfam Joseph	Gulfam Joseph
2022 Championships of the Americas	1	Brazil	Philipe Chateaubrian	Philipe Chateaubrian
2023 European Championships 10m events	2	Serbia	Damir Mikec	Damir Mikec
2023 European Championships 10m events	2	Azerbaijan	Ruslan Lunev	Ruslan Lunev
2023 European Games	1	Turkey	İsmail Keleş	İsmail Keleş
2023 World Championships	4	Bulgaria	Kiril Kirov	Kiril Kirov
2023 World Championships	4	China	Zhang Bowen	Zhang Bowen
2023 World Championships	4	Germany	Robin Walter	Robin Walter
2023 World Championships	4	Switzerland	Jason Solari	Jason Solari
2023 African Championships	2	Algeria	Samir Bouchireb	Samir Bouchireb
2023 African Championships	2	Libya	Mohammed Bin Dallah	Mohammed Bin Dallah
2023 Pan American Games	1	Canada	Tugrul Özer	Michele Esercitato
2023 Asian Championships	2	India	Sarabjot Singh	Sarabjot Singh
2023 Asian Championships	2	Malaysia	Johnathan Wong	Johnathan Wong
2023 Oceania Championships	1	Australia	Bailey Groves	
2024 Asian Rifle & Pistol Championships	2	India	Varun Tomar	Arjun Singh Cheema
2024 Asian Rifle & Pistol Championships	2	Mongolia	Enkhtaivany Davaakhüü	Enkhtaivany Davaakhüü
2024 European Championships 10m events	2	Italy	Paolo Monna	Paolo Monna
2024 European Championships 10m events	2	Slovakia	Juraj Tužinský	Juraj Tužinský
2024 Championships of the Americas	1	Chile	Diego Santiago Parra	Diego Santiago Parra
2024 ISSF World Qualification Tournament	2	Italy	Federico Nilo Maldini	Federico Nilo Maldini
2024 ISSF World Qualification Tournament	2	Individual Neutral Athletes	Uladzislau Dzemesh	
Exchange of quota places	1	Ukraine	—N/a	Viktor Bankin
ISSF World Olympic Rankings	2	Latvia	—N/a	Lauris Strautmanis
ISSF World Olympic Rankings	2	Turkey	—N/a	Yusuf Dikeç
Universality places	1	Aruba	—N/a	Philip Elhage
Invitational place	1	Refugee Olympic Team	—N/a	Francisco Centeno
Athletes qualified for other events	4	Czech Republic	—N/a	Matěj Rampula
Athletes qualified for other events	4	Germany	—N/a	Christian Reitz
Athletes qualified for other events	4	Kazakhstan	—N/a	Nikita Chiryukin
Athletes qualified for other events	4	South Korea	—N/a	Cho Yeong-jae
Total	33			

== Trap men ==
Event	Places	Nation	Qualified athlete	Announced competitor
2022 European Shotgun Championships	2	Czech Republic	Jiří Lipták	Jiří Lipták
2022 European Shotgun Championships	2	Sweden	Rickard Levin-Andersson	Rickard Levin-Andersson
2022 World Shotgun Championships	4	Great Britain	Nathan Hales	Nathan Hales
2022 World Shotgun Championships	4	Chinese Taipei	Yang Kun-pi	Yang Kun-pi
2022 World Shotgun Championships	4	India	Bhowneesh Mendiratta	Prithviraj Tondaiman
2022 World Shotgun Championships	4	United States	Derrick Mein	Derrick Mein
2022 Championships of the Americas	1	United States	Will Hinton	Will Hinton
2023 European Games	1	Italy	Mauro De Filippis	Mauro De Filippis
2023 World Championships	4	Croatia	Giovanni Cernogoraz	Giovanni Cernogoraz
2023 World Championships	4	Italy	Giovanni Pellielo	Giovanni Pellielo
2023 World Championships	4	Kuwait	Khaled Al-Mudhaf	Khaled Al-Mudhaf
2023 World Championships	4	Slovakia	Marián Kovačócy	Marián Kovačócy
2023 European Shotgun Championships	1	France	Sébastien Guerrero	Sébastien Guerrero
2023 African Championships	1	Morocco	Driss Haffari	Driss Haffari
2023 Pan American Games	2	Guatemala	Jean Pierre Brol	Jean Pierre Brol
2023 Pan American Games	2	Venezuela	Leonel Martínez	Leonel Martínez
2023 Asian Championships	2	China	Qi Ying	Qi Ying
2023 Asian Championships	2	Qatar	Saeed Abusharib	Saeed Abusharib
2023 Oceania Championships	1	New Zealand	Owen Robinson	Owen Robinson
2024 Asian Shotgun Championships	2	Iran	Mohammad Beiranvand	Mohammad Beiranvand
2024 Asian Shotgun Championships	2	China	Guo Yuhao	Yu Haicheng
2024 Championships of the Americas	1	Dominican Republic	Eduardo Lorenzo	Eduardo Lorenzo
2024 World Qualification Tournament	2	Turkey	Oğuzhan Tüzün	Oğuzhan Tüzün
2024 World Qualification Tournament	2	Spain	Andrés García	Andrés García
2024 European Shotgun Championships	1	Spain	Alberto Fernández	Alberto Fernández
Exchange of quota places	1	Australia	—N/a	Mitchell Iles
ISSF World Olympic Rankings^{[a]}	2	Australia	—N/a	James Willett
ISSF World Olympic Rankings^{[a]}	2	Great Britain	—N/a	Matthew Coward-Holley
Universality place	2	Malta	—N/a	Gianluca Chetcuti
Universality place	2	Oman	—N/a	Said Al-Khatri
Total	30			

== Skeet men ==
Event	Places	Nation	Qualified athlete	Announced competitor
Host nation	1	France	—N/a	Éric Delaunay
2022 European Shotgun Championships	2	Italy	Luigi Lodde	Tammaro Cassandro
2022 European Shotgun Championships	2	Czech Republic	Jakub Tomeček	Jakub Tomeček
2022 World Shotgun Championships	4	United States	Vincent Hancock	Vincent Hancock
2022 World Shotgun Championships	4	Sweden	Stefan Nilsson	Stefan Nilsson
2022 World Shotgun Championships	4	Egypt	Azmy Mehelba	Azmy Mehelba
2022 World Shotgun Championships	4	Qatar	Rashid Saleh Hamad	Rashid Saleh Hamad
2022 Championships of the Americas	1	United States	Dustan Taylor	Conner Prince
2023 European Games	1	Sweden	Marcus Svensson	Marcus Svensson
2023 World Championships	4	Denmark	Jesper Hansen	Jesper Hansen
2023 World Championships	4	Finland	Eetu Kallioinen	Eetu Kallioinen
2023 World Championships	4	Greece	Efthimios Mitas	Efthimios Mitas
2023 World Championships	4	Norway	Erik Watndal	Erik Watndal
2023 European Shotgun Championships	1	Greece	Charalambos Chalkiadiakis	Charalambos Chalkiadiakis
2023 African Championships	1	Egypt	Omar Hesham Ibrahim	Omar Hesham Ibrahim
2023 Pan American Games	2	Argentina	Federico Gil	Federico Gil
2023 Pan American Games	2	Peru	Nicolás Pacheco	Nicolás Pacheco
2023 Asian Championships	2	South Korea	Kim Min-soo	Kim Min-soo
2023 Asian Championships	2	Chinese Taipei	Lee Meng-yuan	Lee Meng-yuan
2023 Oceania Championships	1	Australia	Frank Morris	Joshua Bell
2024 Asian Shotgun Championships	2	India	Anantjeet Singh Naruka	Anantjeet Singh Naruka
2024 Asian Shotgun Championships	2	Kuwait	Mohammad Al-Daihani	Mohammad Al-Daihani
2024 Championships of the Americas	1	Guatemala	Sebastián Bermúdez	Sebastián Bermúdez
2024 ISSF World Qualification Tournament	2	Kazakhstan	Eduard Yechshenko	Eduard Yechshenko
2024 ISSF World Qualification Tournament	2	Estonia	Peeter Jürisson	Peeter Jürisson
2024 European Shotgun Championships	1	Germany	Sven Korte	Sven Korte
ISSF World Olympic Rankings	1	Italy	—N/a	Gabriele Rossetti
Exchange of quota places	1	China	—N/a	Lü Jianlin
Universality place	2	Iceland	—N/a	Hákon Svavarsson
Universality place	2	Palestine	—N/a	Jorge Antonio Salhe
Total	30			

== 50 m rifle three positions women ==
Event	Places	Nation	Qualified athlete	Announced competitor
Host nation	1	France	—N/a	Judith Gomez
2022 European Championships 25m & 50m events	2	Denmark	Rikke Ibsen	Rikke Ibsen
2022 European Championships 25m & 50m events	2	Czech Republic	Veronika Blažíčková	Veronika Blažíčková
2022 World Rifle & Pistol Championships	4	Norway	Jenny Stene	Jenny Stene
2022 World Rifle & Pistol Championships	4	China	Miao Wanru	Han Jiayu
2022 World Rifle & Pistol Championships	4	United States	Sagen Maddalena	Sagen Maddalena
2022 World Rifle & Pistol Championships	4	South Korea	Lee Eun-seo	Lee Eun-seo
2022 Championships of the Americas	1	United States	Sarah Beard	Mary Tucker
2023 European Games	1	Poland	Natalia Kochańska	Natalia Kochańska
2023 World Championships	4	China	Zhang Qiongyue	Zhang Qiongyue
2023 World Championships	4	India	Sift Kaur Samra	Sift Kaur Samra
2023 World Championships	4	Germany	Lisa Müller	Anna Janßen
2023 World Championships	4	Mongolia	Oyuunbatyn Yesügen	Oyuunbatyn Yesügen
2023 African Championships	1	Egypt	Alzahraa Shaban	
2023 Pan American Games	1	Canada	Shannon Westlake	Shannon Westlake
2023 Asian Championships	2	India	Shriyanka Sadangi	Anjum Moudgil
2023 Asian Championships	2	Kazakhstan	Arina Altukhova	Arina Altukhova
2023 Oceania Championships	1	Australia	Emily Cane	
2023 Oceania Championships	1	New Zealand	Piper Benbow	
2024 Asian Rifle & Pistol Championships	2	South Korea	Kim Je-hee	Im Ha-na
2024 Asian Rifle & Pistol Championships	2	Kazakhstan	Alexandra Le	Alexandra Le
2024 Championships of the Americas	1	Brazil	Geovana Meyer	Geovana Meyer
2024 ISSF World Qualification Tournament	2	Switzerland	Emely Jäggi	Nina Christen
2024 ISSF World Qualification Tournament	2	Poland	Aleksandra Pietruk	Aleksandra Pietruk
2024 European Championships 25m & 50m events	2	Switzerland	Chiara Leone	Chiara Leone
2024 European Championships 25m & 50m events	2	Individual Neutral Athletes	Darya Chuprys	Darya Chuprys
ISSF World Olympic Rankings	5	Germany	—N/a	Jolyn Beer
ISSF World Olympic Rankings	5	Denmark	—N/a	Stephanie Grundsøe
ISSF World Olympic Rankings	5	Austria	—N/a	Nadine Ungerank
ISSF World Olympic Rankings	5	Italy	—N/a	Barbara Gambaro
ISSF World Olympic Rankings	5	Puerto Rico	—N/a	Yarimar Mercado
Athletes qualified for other events	4	Cuba	—N/a	Lisbet Hernández
Athletes qualified for other events	4	Great Britain	—N/a	Seonaid McIntosh
Athletes qualified for other events	4	Hungary	—N/a	Eszter Mészáros
Athletes qualified for other events	4	Norway	—N/a	Jeanette Hegg Duestad
Total	32			

== 10 m air rifle women ==
Event	Places	Nation	Qualified athlete	Announced competitor
2022 World Rifle & Pistol Championships	4	United States	Alison Weisz	Sagen Maddalena
2022 World Rifle & Pistol Championships	4	China	Huang Yuting	Huang Yuting
2022 World Rifle & Pistol Championships	4	Poland	Julia Piotrowska	Julia Piotrowska
2022 World Rifle & Pistol Championships	4	South Korea	Keum Ji-hyeon	Keum Ji-hyeon
2022 Championships of the Americas	1	United States	Mary Tucker	Mary Tucker
2023 European Championships 10m events	2	Great Britain	Seonaid McIntosh	Seonaid McIntosh
2023 European Championships 10m events	2	Norway	Jeanette Hegg Duestad	Jeanette Hegg Duestad
2023 European Games	1	Switzerland	Nina Christen	Nina Christen
2023 World Championships	4	China	Han Jiayu	Han Jiayu
2023 World Championships	4	India	Mehuli Ghosh	Ramita Jindal
2023 World Championships	4	Iran	Shermineh Chehel Amirani	Shermineh Chehel Amirani
2023 World Championships	4	Switzerland	Audrey Gogniat	Audrey Gogniat
2023 African Championships	2	Algeria	Houda Chaabi	Houda Chaabi
2023 African Championships	2	Egypt	Remas Khalil	Remas Khalil
2023 Pan American Games	1	Argentina	Fernanda Russo	Fernanda Russo
2023 Asian Championships	2	South Korea	Kwon Eun-ji	Ban Hyo-jin
2023 Asian Championships	2	India	Tilottama Sen	Elavenil Valarivan
2023 Oceania Championships	1	Australia	Elise Collier	
2024 Asian Rifle & Pistol Championships	2	Vietnam	Lê Thị Mộng Tuyền	Lê Thị Mộng Tuyền
2024 Asian Rifle & Pistol Championships	2	Iran	Fatemeh Amini	Fatemeh Amini
2024 European Championships 10m events	2	Germany	Anna Janßen	Lisa Müller
2024 European Championships 10m events	2	France	Océanne Muller	Océanne Muller
2024 Championships of the Americas	1	Cuba	Lisbet Hernández	Lisbet Hernández|
2024 ISSF World Qualification Tournament	2	France	Manon Herbulot	Manon Herbulot
2024 ISSF World Qualification Tournament	2	Norway	Synnøve Berg	Synnøve Berg
Exchange of quota places	1	Egypt	—N/a	Mai Magdy Elsayed
ISSF World Olympic Rankings	4	Poland	—N/a	Aneta Stankiewicz
ISSF World Olympic Rankings	4	Hungary	—N/a	Eszter Mészáros
ISSF World Olympic Rankings	4	Japan	—N/a	Misaki Nobata
ISSF World Olympic Rankings	4	Mexico	—N/a	Goretti Zumaya
Universality places	3	Nicaragua	—N/a	Mariel López Pavón
Universality places	3	North Macedonia	—N/a	Anastasija Mojsovska
Universality places	3	Nepal	—N/a	Sushmita Nepal
Invitational place	1	Refugee Olympic Team	—N/a	Luna Solomon
Athletes qualified for other events	10	Austria	—N/a	Nadine Ungerank
Athletes qualified for other events	10	Brazil	—N/a	Geovana Meyer
Athletes qualified for other events	10	Czech Republic	—N/a	Veronika Blažíčková
Athletes qualified for other events	10	Denmark	—N/a	Stephanie Grundsøe
Athletes qualified for other events	10	Denmark	—N/a	Rikke Ibsen
Athletes qualified for other events	10	Germany	—N/a	Anna Janßen
Athletes qualified for other events	10	Italy	—N/a	Barbara Gambaro
Athletes qualified for other events	10	Kazakhstan	—N/a	Arina Altukhova
Athletes qualified for other events	10	Kazakhstan	—N/a	Alexandra Le
Athletes qualified for other events	10	Puerto Rico	—N/a	Yarimar Mercado
Total	43			

== 25 m pistol women ==
Event	Places	Nation	Qualified athlete	Announced competitor
2022 European Championships 25m & 50m events	2	Germany	Doreen Vennekamp	Doreen Vennekamp
2022 European Championships 25m & 50m events	2	Poland	Klaudia Breś	Klaudia Breś
2022 World Rifle & Pistol Championships	4	South Korea	Kim Jang-mi	Kim Ye-ji
2022 World Rifle & Pistol Championships	4	Bulgaria	Antoaneta Kostadinova	Antoaneta Kostadinova
2022 World Rifle & Pistol Championships	4	China	Chen Yan	Zhao Nan
2022 World Rifle & Pistol Championships	4	Iran	Hanieh Rostamian	Hanieh Rostamian
2022 Championships of the Americas	1	United States	Katelyn Abeln	Katelyn Abeln
2023 European Games	1	Georgia	Nino Salukvadze	Nino Salukvadze
2023 World Championships	4	Chinese Taipei	Tien Chia-chen	Tien Chia-chen
2023 World Championships	4	Latvia	Agate Rašmane	Agate Rašmane
2023 World Championships	4	South Korea	Yang Ji-in	Yang Ji-in
2023 World Championships	4	Thailand	Tanyaporn Prucksakorn	Tanyaporn Prucksakorn
2023 African Championships	1	Egypt	Nour Abbas Mohammed	Nour Abbas Mohammed
2023 Pan American Games	2	Mexico	Alejandra Zavala	Alejandra Zavala
2023 Pan American Games	2	Ecuador	Diana Durango	Diana Durango
2023 Asian Championships	2	China	Liu Rui	Liang Xiaoya
2023 Asian Championships	2	India	Manu Bhaker	Manu Bhaker
2023 Oceania Championships	1	Australia	Siobhan Nicholls	Elena Galiabovitch
2024 Asian Rifle & Pistol Championships	2	India	Rhythm Sangwan	Esha Singh
2024 Asian Rifle & Pistol Championships	2	Chinese Taipei	Wu Chia-ying	Wu Chia-ying
2024 Championships of the Americas	1	Cuba	Laina Pérez	Laina Pérez
2024 ISSF World Qualification Tournament	2	Germany	Josefin Eder	Josefin Eder
2024 ISSF World Qualification Tournament	2	Hungary	Veronika Major	Veronika Major
2024 European Championships 25m & 50m events	2	Individual Neutral Athletes	Aliaksandra Piatrova	Aliaksandra Piatrova
2024 European Championships 25m & 50m events	2	Sweden	Stina Lawner	Stina Lawner
Exchange of quota places	1	United States	—N/a	Ada Korkhin
ISSF World Olympic Rankings	3	France	—N/a	Mathilde Lamolle
ISSF World Olympic Rankings	3	Austria	—N/a	Sylvia Steiner
ISSF World Olympic Rankings	3	Singapore	—N/a	Teh Xiu Hong
Athletes qualified for other events	11	Albania	—N/a	Manjola Konini
Athletes qualified for other events	11	Ecuador	—N/a	Andrea Pérez Peña
Athletes qualified for other events	11	France	—N/a	Camille Jedrzejewski
Athletes qualified for other events	11	Greece	—N/a	Anna Korakaki
Athletes qualified for other events	11	Hungary	—N/a	Sára Ráhel Fábián
Athletes qualified for other events	11	Pakistan	—N/a	Kishmala Talat
Athletes qualified for other events	11	Thailand	—N/a	Kamonlak Saencha
Athletes qualified for other events	11	Turkey	—N/a	Şevval İlayda Tarhan
Athletes qualified for other events	11	Turkey	—N/a	Şimal Yılmaz
Athletes qualified for other events	11	Ukraine	—N/a	Olena Kostevych
Athletes qualified for other events	11	Vietnam	—N/a	Trịnh Thu Vinh
Total	40			

== 10 m air pistol women ==
Event	Places	Nation	Qualified athlete	Announced competitor
2022 World Rifle & Pistol Championships	4	China	Lu Kaiman	Li Xue
2022 World Rifle & Pistol Championships	4	Greece	Anna Korakaki	Anna Korakaki
2022 World Rifle & Pistol Championships	4	Serbia	Zorana Arunović	Zorana Arunović
2022 World Rifle & Pistol Championships	4	Armenia	Elmira Karapetyan	Elmira Karapetyan
2022 Championships of the Americas	1	United States	Suman Kaur Sanghera	Katelyn Abeln
2023 European Championships 10m events	2	France	Camille Jedrzejewski	Camille Jedrzejewski
2023 European Championships 10m events	2	Greece	Christina Moschi	Christina Moschi
2023 European Games	1	Ukraine	Olena Kostevych	Olena Kostevych
2023 World Championships	4	China	Jiang Ranxin	Jiang Ranxin
2023 World Championships	4	Hungary	Sára Ráhel Fábián	Sára Ráhel Fábián
2023 World Championships	4	South Korea	Kim Bo-mi	Kim Ye-ji
2023 World Championships	4	Vietnam	Trịnh Thu Vinh	Trịnh Thu Vinh
2023 African Championships	2	Egypt	Hala El-Gohari	Hala El-Gohari
2023 African Championships	2	Tunisia	Olfa Charni	Olfa Charni
2023 Pan American Games	1	United States	Alexis Lagan	Alexis Lagan
2023 Asian Championships	2	South Korea	Oh Ye-jin	Oh Ye-jin
2023 Asian Championships	2	Chinese Taipei	Liu Heng-yu	Liu Heng-yu
2023 Oceania Championships	1	Australia	Dannielle Donohue	Elena Galiabovitch
2024 Asian Rifle & Pistol Championships	2	India	Esha Singh	Manu Bhaker
2024 Asian Rifle & Pistol Championships	2	Pakistan	Kishmala Talat	Kishmala Talat
2024 European Championships 10m events	2	Moldova	Anna Dulce	Anna Dulce
2024 European Championships 10m events	2	Turkey	Şimal Yılmaz	Şimal Yılmaz
2024 Championships of the Americas	1	Ecuador	Andrea Pérez Peña	Andrea Pérez Peña
2024 ISSF World Qualification Tournament	2	Thailand	Kamonlak Saencha	Kamonlak Saencha
2024 ISSF World Qualification Tournament	2	India	Palak Gulia	Rhythm Sangwan
ISSF World Olympic Rankings^{[a]}	3	Turkey	—N/a	Şevval İlayda Tarhan
ISSF World Olympic Rankings^{[a]}	3	Kazakhstan	—N/a	Irina Yunusmetova
ISSF World Olympic Rankings^{[a]}	3	Chinese Taipei	—N/a	Yu Ai-wen
Universality place	1	Albania	—N/a	Manjola Konini
Universality place	1	Yemen	—N/a	Yasameen Al-Raimi
Athletes qualified for other events	14	Austria	—N/a	Sylvia Steiner
Athletes qualified for other events	14	Bulgaria	—N/a	Antoaneta Kostadinova
Athletes qualified for other events	14	Cuba	—N/a	Laina Pérez
Athletes qualified for other events	14	Ecuador	—N/a	Diana Durango
Athletes qualified for other events	14	Egypt	—N/a	Nour Abbas Mohammed
Athletes qualified for other events	14	Germany	—N/a	Josefin Eder
Athletes qualified for other events	14	Germany	—N/a	Doreen Vennekamp
Athletes qualified for other events	14	Hungary	—N/a	Veronika Major
Athletes qualified for other events	14	Iran	—N/a	Hanieh Rostamian
Athletes qualified for other events	14	Latvia	—N/a	Agate Rašmane
Athletes qualified for other events	14	Mexico	—N/a	Alejandra Zavala
Athletes qualified for other events	14	Poland	—N/a	Klaudia Breś
Athletes qualified for other events	14	Singapore	—N/a	Teh Xiu Hong
Athletes qualified for other events	14	Thailand	—N/a	Tanyaporn Prucksakorn
Total	44			

== Trap women ==
Event	Places	Nation	Qualified athlete	Announced competitor
2022 European Shotgun Championships	2	Italy	Silvana Stanco	Silvana Stanco
2022 European Shotgun Championships	2	Great Britain	Lucy Hall	Lucy Hall
2022 World Shotgun Championships	4	Slovakia	Zuzana Rehák-Štefečeková	Zuzana Rehák-Štefečeková
2022 World Shotgun Championships	4	France	Carole Cormenier	Carole Cormenier
2022 World Shotgun Championships	4	Australia	Catherine Skinner	Catherine Skinner
2022 World Shotgun Championships	4	Spain	Fátima Gálvez	Fátima Gálvez
2022 Championships of the Americas	1	United States	Aeriel Skinner	Ryann Phillips
2023 European Games	1	Italy	Jessica Rossi	Jessica Rossi
2023 World Championships	4	Chinese Taipei	Lin Yi-chun	Lin Yi-chun
2023 World Championships	4	Germany	Kathrin Murche	Kathrin Murche
2023 World Championships	4	China	Wu Cuicui	Wu Cuicui
2023 World Championships	4	India	Rajeshwari Kumari	Rajeshwari Kumari
2023 European Shotgun Championships	1	Portugal	Maria Inês Barros	Maria Inês Barros
2023 African Championships	1	Egypt	Mariam Elsayed	Maggy Ashmawy
2023 Pan American Games	2	Guatemala	Adriana Ruano	Adriana Ruano
2023 Pan American Games	2	United States	Rachel Tozier	Rachel Tozier
2023 Asian Championships	2	Lebanon	Ray Bassil	Ray Bassil
2023 Asian Championships	2	South Korea	Cho Seon-ah	Kang Gee-eun
2023 Oceanian Championships	1	Australia	Laetisha Scanlan	Penny Smith
2024 Asian Shotgun Championships	2	Chinese Taipei	Liu Wan-yu	Liu Wan-yu
2024 Asian Shotgun Championships	2	China	Zhang Xinqiu	Zhang Xinqiu
2024 Championships of the Americas	1	Guatemala	Waleska Soto	Waleska Soto
2024 World Qualification Tournament	2	France	Mélanie Couzy	Mélanie Couzy
2024 World Qualification Tournament	2	Kazakhstan	Mariya Dmitriyenko	Mariya Dmitriyenko
2024 European Shotgun Championships	1	Turkey	Rümeysa Pelin Kaya	Rümeysa Pelin Kaya
Exchange of quota places	2	India	—N/a	Shreyasi Singh
Exchange of quota places	2	South Korea	—N/a	Lee Bo-na
ISSF World Olympic Rankings^{[a]}	3	San Marino	—N/a	Alessandra Perilli
ISSF World Olympic Rankings^{[a]}	3	Spain	—N/a	Mar Molné
ISSF World Olympic Rankings^{[a]}	3	Finland	—N/a	Noora Antikainen
Total	30			

== Skeet women ==
Event	Places	Nation	Qualified athlete	Announced competitor
2022 European Championships	2	Great Britain	Amber Rutter	Amber Rutter
2022 European Championships	2	Germany	Nadine Messerschmidt	Nadine Messerschmidt
2022 World Championships	4	United States	Samantha Simonton	Austen Smith
2022 World Championships	4	Italy	Diana Bacosi	Diana Bacosi
2022 World Championships	4	Slovakia	Vanesa Hocková	Vanesa Hocková
2022 World Championships	4	Ukraine	Iryna Malovichko	Iryna Malovichko
2022 Championships of the Americas	1	United States	Dania Vizzi	Dania Vizzi
2023 European Games	1	Italy	Martina Bartolomei	Martina Bartolomei
2023 World Championships	4	Chile	Francisca Crovetto	Francisca Crovetto
2023 World Championships	4	Greece	Emmanouela Katzouraki	Emmanouela Katzouraki
2023 World Championships	4	Slovakia	Danka Barteková	Danka Barteková
2023 World Championships	4	Turkey	Sena Can	Sena Can
2023 European Shotgun Championships	1	Germany	Nele Wißmer	Nele Wißmer
2023 African Championships	1	Egypt	Amira Aboushokka	Amira Aboushokka
2023 Pan American Games	2	Mexico	Gabriela Rodríguez	Gabriela Rodríguez
2023 Pan American Games	2	Peru	Daniella Borda	Daniella Borda
2023 Asian Championships	2	China	Wei Meng	Wei Meng
2023 Asian Championships	2	South Korea	Jang Kook-hee	Jang Kook-hee
2023 Oceania Championships	1	Australia	Aislin Jones	Aislin Jones
2024 Asian Shotgun Championships	2	China	Gao Jinmei	Jiang Yiting
2024 Asian Shotgun Championships	2	India	Raiza Dhillon	Raiza Dhillon
2024 Championships of the Americas	1	Brazil	Geórgia Furquim	Geórgia Furquim
2024 ISSF World Qualification Tournament	2	India	Maheshwari Chauhan	Maheshwari Chauhan
2024 ISSF World Qualification Tournament	2	Sweden	Victoria Larsson	Victoria Larsson
2024 European Shotgun Championships	1	France	Lucie Anastassiou	Lucie Anastassiou
Exchange of quota places	1	New Zealand	—N/a	Chloe Tipple
ISSF World Olympic Rankings	3	Kazakhstan	—N/a	Assem Orynbay
ISSF World Olympic Rankings	3	Czech Republic	—N/a	Barbora Šumová
ISSF World Olympic Rankings	3	Cyprus	—N/a	Konstantia Nikolaou
Total	29			

== Notes ==
- ^{a} Host nation France was awarded twelve quota places in all individual shooting events for the Games. Six French shooters (Bessaguet, Cormenier, Jedrzejewski, Guerrero, Kryzs, and Muller) attained a direct nomination to the Olympic team based on their performances at the European and World Championships, thereby leaving the vacancies unused for reallocation to the next highest-ranked shooter through the ISSF World Olympic Rankings.

== See also ==
- Shooting at the 2024 Summer Paralympics – Qualification
