= 2026 ISSF World Cup =

International shooting competition

- Sport: Shooting
- Hosts: (Morocco) Tangier (Spain) Granada (Kazakhstan) Almaty (Germany) Munich (Italy) Lonato (China) Hangzhou (Egypt) Cairo (Italy) Rome
- Duration: 25 March – 8 December

Seasons
- ← 2025 2027 →

The 2026 ISSF World Cup is the 41st edition of the ISSF World Cup, an annual Olympic shooting event, governed by the International Shooting Sport Federation. It is currently being held from 25 March to 8 December across eight host nations.

== Calendar ==
The calendar for the 2026 ISSF World Cup

Leg	Dates	Location	Type	Venue	Ref.
1	25 March – 3 April	(Morocco) Tangier	Shotgun	Club Tangérois de Tir	
2	5 – 13 April	(Spain) Granada	Rifle/Pistol	Las Gabias Shooting Center	
3	2 – 11 May	(Kazakhstan) Almaty	Shotgun	Asanov Shooting Club	
4	24 – 31 May	(Germany) Munich	Rifle/Pistol	Olympic Shooting Range Munich/Hochbrück	
5	3 – 13 July	(Italy) Lonato	Shotgun	Trap Concaverde	
6	20 – 29 July	(China) Hangzhou	Rifle/Pistol/Shotgun	Fuyang Yinhu Sports Centre	
7	8 – 16 October	(Egypt) Cairo	Rifle/Pistol	Egypt International Olympic City	
Final	3 – 8 December	(Italy) Rome	Rifle/Pistol/Shotgun		

== Rifle events ==
=== Men's individual ===
10m Air Rifle
Stage	Venue	1st place, gold medalist(s)	2nd place, silver medalist(s)	3rd place, bronze medalist(s)
1	(Spain) Granada	Sheng Lihao (CHN)	Aleksa Rakonjac (SRB)	Victor Lindgren (SWE)
2	(Germany) Munich	Zhang Changhong (CHN)	Shin Minki (KOR)	Victor Lindgren (SWE)
3	(China) Hangzhou	Sheng Lihao (CHN)	Zhang Changhong (CHN)	Victor Lindgren (SWE)
4	(Egypt) Cairo	Jiří Přívratský (CZE)	Marcus Madsen (SWE)	Dimitri Dutendas (FRA)
Final	(Italy) Rome	(25x17px)	(25x17px)	(25x17px)

50m Rifle 3 Positions
Stage	Venue	1st place, gold medalist(s)	2nd place, silver medalist(s)	3rd place, bronze medalist(s)
1	(Spain) Granada	Zhang Changhong (CHN)	Lucas Kryzs (FRA)	Liu Yukun (CHN)
2	(Germany) Munich	Jon-Hermann Hegg (NOR)	Lucas Kryzs (FRA)	Dimitri Dutendas (FRA)
3	(China) Hangzhou	Zhang Changhong (CHN)	István Péni (HUN)	Matvei Potapov (AIN)
4	(Egypt) Cairo	Lucas Kryzs (FRA)	Jon-Hermann Hegg (NOR)	Jiří Přívratský (CZE)
Final	(Italy) Rome	(25x17px)	(25x17px)	(25x17px)

=== Women's individual ===
10m Air Rifle
Stage	Venue	1st place, gold medalist(s)	2nd place, silver medalist(s)	3rd place, bronze medalist(s)
1	(Spain) Granada	Wang Zifei (CHN)	Jeanette Hegg Duestad (NOR)	Han Jiayu (CHN)
2	(Germany) Munich	Anđelija Stevanović (SRB)	Misaki Nobata (JPN)	Wang Zifei (CHN)
3	(China) Hangzhou	Du Yuchen (CHN)	Misaki Nobata (JPN)	Han Jiayu (CHN)
4	(Egypt) Cairo	Aleksandra Stojadinović (SRB)	Anđelija Stevanović (SRB)	Misaki Nobata (JPN)
Final	(Italy) Rome	(25x17px)	(25x17px)	(25x17px)

50m Rifle 3 Positions
Stage	Venue	1st place, gold medalist(s)	2nd place, silver medalist(s)	3rd place, bronze medalist(s)
1	(Spain) Granada	Anna Janssen (GER)	Nele Stark (GER)	Emely Jäggi (SUI)
2	(Germany) Munich	Jeanette Hegg Duestad (NOR)	Seonaid McIntosh (GBR)	Anna Janssen (GER)
3	(China) Hangzhou	Seonaid McIntosh (GBR)	Han Jiayu (CHN)	Jeanette Hegg Duestad (NOR)
4	(Egypt) Cairo	Jeanette Hegg Duestad (NOR)	Veronika Blažíčková (CZE)	Rikke Mæng Ibsen (DEN)
Final	(Italy) Rome	(25x17px)	(25x17px)	(25x17px)

=== Mixed Team ===
10m Air Rifle
Stage	Venue	1st place, gold medalist(s)	2nd place, silver medalist(s)	3rd place, bronze medalist(s)
1	(Spain) Granada	China; Wang Zifei; Sheng Lihao	Hungary; Eszter Dénes; István Péni	Norway; Jeanette Hegg Duestad; Jon-Hermann Hegg
2	(Germany) Munich	China; Wang Zifei; Sheng Lihao	Norway; Jeanette Hegg Duestad; Jon-Hermann Hegg	China; Han Jiayu; Ma Sihan
3	(China) Hangzhou	China; Wang Zifei; Sheng Lihao	China; Du Yuchen; Zhang Changhong	India; Sonam Maskar; Himanshu Dhillon
4	(Egypt) Cairo	Japan; Misaki Nobata; Naoki Hanakawa	Croatia; Anamarija Turk; Miran Maričić	Germany; Anna Janssen; Maximilian Ulbrich
Final	(Italy) Rome	{{}} [[]] [[]]	{{}} [[]] [[]]	{{}} [[]] [[]]

== Pistol events ==
=== Men's individual ===
10m Air Pistol
Stage	Venue	1st place, gold medalist(s)	2nd place, silver medalist(s)	3rd place, bronze medalist(s)
1	(Spain) Granada	Bu Shuaihang (CHN)	Anton Aristarkhov (AIN)	Buğra Selimzade (TUR)
2	(Germany) Munich	Hong Suhyeon (KOR)	Jason Solari (SUI)	Hsieh Hsiang-chen (TPE)
3	(China) Hangzhou	Bu Shuaihang (CHN)	Hong Suhyeon (KOR)	Vladimir Svechnikov (UZB)
4	(Egypt) Cairo	Udhayveer Sidhu (IND)	Christian Reitz (GER)	Paolo Monna (ITA)
Final	(Italy) Rome	(25x17px)	(25x17px)	(25x17px)

25m Rapid Fire Pistol
Stage	Venue	1st place, gold medalist(s)	2nd place, silver medalist(s)	3rd place, bronze medalist(s)
1	(Spain) Granada	Yang Yuhao (CHN)	Massimo Spinella (ITA)	Jean Quiquampoix (FRA)
2	(Germany) Munich	Su Lianbofan (CHN)	Clément Bessaguet (FRA)	Florian Peter (GER)
3	(China) Hangzhou	Oliver Geis (GER)	Emanuel Mueller (GER)	He Shiyu (CHN)
4	(Egypt) Cairo	Oliver Geis (GER)	Florian Peter (GER)	Emanuel Muller (GER)
Final	(Italy) Rome	(25x17px)	(25x17px)	(25x17px)

=== Women's individual ===
10m Air Pistol
Stage	Venue	1st place, gold medalist(s)	2nd place, silver medalist(s)	3rd place, bronze medalist(s)
1	(Spain) Granada	Shen Yiyao (CHN)	Yao Qianxun (CHN)	Zorana Arunović (SRB)
2	(Germany) Munich	Suruchi Singh (IND)	Esha Singh (IND)	Choo Ga-eun (KOR)
3	(China) Hangzhou	Yao Qianxun (CHN)	Sainyam Vij (IND)	Hanieh Rostamian (IRI)
4	(Egypt) Cairo	Elmira Karapetyan (ARM)	Miroslava Mincheva (BUL)	Camille Jedrzejewski (FRA)
Final	(Italy) Rome	(25x17px)	(25x17px)	(25x17px)

25m Pistol
Stage	Venue	1st place, gold medalist(s)	2nd place, silver medalist(s)	3rd place, bronze medalist(s)
1	(Spain) Granada	Xiao Jiaruixuan (CHN)	Kong Jieru (CHN)	Camille Jedrzejewski (FRA)
2	(Germany) Munich	Esha Singh (IND)	Doreen Vennekamp (GER)	Miroslava Mincheva (BUL)
3	(China) Hangzhou	Esha Singh (IND)	Zhang Yueyue (CHN)	Manu Bhaker (IND)
4	(Egypt) Cairo	Teh Xiu Yi (SIN)	Heloise Fourre (FRA)	Miroslava Mincheva (BUL)
Final	(Italy) Rome	(25x17px)	(25x17px)	(25x17px)

=== Mixed Team ===
10m Air Pistol
Stage	Venue	1st place, gold medalist(s)	2nd place, silver medalist(s)	3rd place, bronze medalist(s)
1	(Spain) Granada	India; Palak Gulia; Mukesh Nelavalli	China; Yao Qianxun; Hu Kai	Hungary; Veronika Major; Akos Nagy
2	(Germany) Munich	China; Yao Qianxun; Hu Kai	India; Manu Bhaker; Samrat Rana	China; Shen Yiyao; Bu Shuaihang
3	(China) Hangzhou	China; Yao Qianxun; Hu Kai	China; Shen Yiyao; Bu Shuaihang	South Korea; Kim Bo-mi; Hong Suhyeon
4	(Egypt) Cairo	France; Camille Jedrzejewski; Theo Moczko	Latvia; Agate Rašmane; Emils Vasermanis	Ukraine; Olena Kostevych; Pavlo Korostylov
Final	(Italy) Rome	{{}} [[]] [[]]	{{}} [[]] [[]]	{{}} [[]] [[]]

== Shotgun events ==
=== Men's individual ===
Trap
Stage	Venue	1st place, gold medalist(s)	2nd place, silver medalist(s)	3rd place, bronze medalist(s)
1	(Morocco) Tangier	Alessandro de Souza Ferreira (PER)	Driss Haffari (MAR)	Jean Pierre Brol (GUA)
2	(Kazakhstan) Almaty	Nedim Tolga Tuncer (TUR)	Derrick Mein (USA)	Qi Ying (CHN)
3	(Italy) Lonato	Erminio Frasca (ITA)	Andrés García (ESP)	Clément Bourgue (FRA)
4	(China) Hangzhou	William Hinton (USA)	Angelo Scalzone (QAT)	Qi Ying (CHN)
Final	(Italy) Rome	(25x17px)	(25x17px)	(25x17px)

Skeet
Stage	Venue	1st place, gold medalist(s)	2nd place, silver medalist(s)	3rd place, bronze medalist(s)
1	(Morocco) Tangier	Timi Vallioniemi (FIN)	Domenico Simeone (ITA)	Erik Pittini (ITA)
2	(Kazakhstan) Almaty	Gabriele Rossetti (ITA)	Sven Korte (GER)	Shotaro Taguchi (JPN)
3	(Italy) Lonato	Vincent Hancock (USA)	Christian Elliott (USA)	Erik Pittini (ITA)
4	(China) Hangzhou	Rashid Saleh Al-Athba (QAT)	Jose Maria Mielgo Moneo (ESP)	Lyu Jianlin (CHN)
Final	(Italy) Rome	(25x17px)	(25x17px)	(25x17px)

=== Women's individual ===
Trap
Stage	Venue	1st place, gold medalist(s)	2nd place, silver medalist(s)	3rd place, bronze medalist(s)
1	(Morocco) Tangier	Erica Sessa (ITA)	Jessica Rossi (ITA)	Mar Molne Magrina (ESP)
2	(Kazakhstan) Almaty	Penny Smith (AUS)	Fatima Galvez (ESP)	Zuzana Rehák-Štefečeková (SVK)
3	(Italy) Lonato	Neeru Dhanda (IND)	Carole Cormenier (FRA)	Erica Sessa (ITA)
4	(China) Hangzhou	Carole Cormenier (FRA)	Rachel Tozier (USA)	Dean Kiara Sioux-Lin (AUS)
Final	(Italy) Rome	(25x17px)	(25x17px)	(25x17px)

Skeet
Stage	Venue	1st place, gold medalist(s)	2nd place, silver medalist(s)	3rd place, bronze medalist(s)
1	(Morocco) Tangier	Bethany Norton (GBR)	Dania Vizzi (USA)	Lucie Anastassiou (FRA)
2	(Kazakhstan) Almaty	Assem Orynbay (KAZ)	Jiang Yiting (CHN)	Martina Bartolomei (ITA)
3	(Italy) Lonato	Sara Bongini (ITA)	Victoria Larsson (SWE)	Amber Rutter (GBR)
4	(China) Hangzhou	Kimberly Rhode (USA)	Samantha Simonton (USA)	Che Yufei (CHN)
Final	(Italy) Rome	(25x17px)	(25x17px)	(25x17px)

=== Mixed Team ===
Trap
Stage	Venue	1st place, gold medalist(s)	2nd place, silver medalist(s)	3rd place, bronze medalist(s)
1	(Morocco) Tangier	Italy; Daniele Resca; Jessica Rossi	Portugal; José Manuel Bruno Faria; Inês Barros	Czech Republic; Jiří Lipták; Zina Hrdličková
2	(Kazakhstan) Almaty	Chinese Taipei; Yang Kun-pi; Liu Wan-yu	Italy; Mauro De Filippis; Silvana Stanco	India; Vivaan Kapoor; Neeru Dhanda
3	(Italy) Lonato	Australia; James Willett; Catherine Skinner	United Kingdom; Nathan Hales; Ellie Seward	Turkey; Yavuz İlnam; Safiye Sarıtürk Temizdemir
4	(China) Hangzhou	Australia; James Willett; Penny Smith	China; Qi Ying; Sun Yunong	Italy; Massimo Fabbrizi; Alessia Iezzi
Final	(Italy) Rome	{{}} [[]] [[]]	{{}} [[]] [[]]	{{}} [[]] [[]]

== Medal table ==
Rank	Nation	Gold	Silver	Bronze	Total
1	China	19	10	11	40
2	India	6	3	3	12
3	Italy	5	4	6	15
4	Germany	3	6	4	13
5	France	3	5	7	15
6	United States	3	5	0	8
7	Norway	3	3	2	8
8	Australia	3	0	1	4
9	Great Britain	2	2	1	5
9	Serbia	2	2	1	5
11	Japan	1	2	2	5
11	South Korea	1	2	2	5
13	Czech Republic	1	1	2	4
14	Qatar	1	1	0	2
15	Turkey	1	0	2	3
16	Chinese Taipei	1	0	1	2
17	Armenia	1	0	0	1
17	Finland	1	0	0	1
17	Kazakhstan	1	0	0	1
17	Peru	1	0	0	1
17	Singapore	1	0	0	1
22	Spain	0	3	1	4
23	Sweden	0	2	3	5
24	Hungary	0	2	1	3
25	Bulgaria	0	1	2	3
26	Individual Neutral Athletes	0	1	1	2
26	Switzerland	0	1	1	2
28	Croatia	0	1	0	1
28	Latvia	0	1	0	1
28	Morocco	0	1	0	1
28	Portugal	0	1	0	1
32	Denmark	0	0	1	1
32	Guatemala	0	0	1	1
32	Iran	0	0	1	1
32	Slovakia	0	0	1	1
32	Ukraine	0	0	1	1
32	Uzbekistan	0	0	1	1
Totals (37 entries)		60	60	60	180
