= Kamaljeet Sahlot =

Indian sport shooter (born 2003)

Personal information
- Born: 22 August 2003 (age 23) Rewari, Haryana, India
- Height: 1.68 m (5 ft 6 in)

Sport
- Sport: Shooting
- Event: 50 m pistol
Medal record
Representing India
Men's 10 m air pistol shooting
Asian Games
Gold medal – first place	2026 Aichi–Nagoya	Mixed team
Men's 50 m pistol shooting
World Championships
Silver medal – second place	2025 Cairo	Team
Bronze medal – third place	2023 Baku	Team
Asian Championships
Gold medal – first place	2026 New Delhi	Team
Silver medal – second place	2026 New Delhi	Individual
Junior World Championships
Gold medal – first place	2023 Changwon	Individual
Gold medal – first place	2023 Changwon	Team
Gold medal – first place	2024 Lima	Team
Junior Asian Championships
Silver medal – second place	2023 Changwon	Individual
Silver medal – second place	2023 Changwon	Team

Kamaljeet Singh Sahlot (born 22 August 2003) is an Indian sport shooter who competes in the 10 m air pistol and 50 m pistol events. He won the gold medal in the mixed team pistol event at the 2026 Asian Games, breaking the Games record during the finals.
