= Sara Bongini =

Italian sport shooter (born 2002)

Personal information
- Nationality: Italian
- Born: 14 July 2002 (age 24) Bagno a Ripoli, Italy
- Height: 167 cm (5 ft 6 in)

Sport
- Sport: Shooting
- Event: Skeet
- Club: Fiamme Oro
Medal record
Women's Shooting
Representing Italy
World Championships
Bronze medal – third place	2026 Doha	Skeet team
European Championships
Gold medal – first place	2026 Athens	Skeet team
Mediterranean Games
Gold medal – first place	2026 Taranto	Skeet
Junior World Championships
Gold medal – first place	2021 Lima	Mixed skeet team
Gold medal – first place	2023 Changwon	Mixed skeet team
Silver medal – second place	2021 Lima	Skeet team
Silver medal – second place	2023 Changwon	Skeet team
Bronze medal – third place	2021 Lima	Skeet

Sara Bongini (born 14 July 2002) is an Italian sport shooter competing in the skeet event.

== Career ==
On 7 July 2026, during the third stage of the 2026 ISSF World Cup in Lonato, she won the skeet title after a shoot-off for her first career ISSF World Cup victory. During the final she set a world record of 35 hits. In August 2026, Bongini competed at the 2026 Mediterranean Games and won a gold medal in the skeet event. She recorded 32 hits out of 36 during the final against Çiğdem Özyaman.
