= Du Yuchen =

Chinese sport shooter (born 2010)

Personal information
- Nationality: Chinese
- Born: 22 June 2010 (age 16)

Sport
- Sport: Shooting
- Event: 10 meter air rifle
Medal record
Women's Shooting
Representing China
World Championships
Gold medal – first place	2026 Doha	10 m air rifle team
Asian Games
Gold medal – first place	2026 Aichi–Nagoya	10 m air rifle team

Du Yuchen (Chinese: 杜雨宸; born 22 June 2010) is a Chinese sport shooter competing in the 10 meter air rifle event.

== Career ==
In July 2026, during the 2026 ISSF World Cup in Hangzhou, Du won her first career ISSF World Cup gold medal in the 10 m air rifle event with a score of 254.6 points.

In September 2026, she competed at the 2026 Asian Games and won a gold medal in the 10 metre air rifle team event, along with Wang Zifei and Han Jiayu. The team finished with a world record and Asian Games record score of 1904.2. At 16 years old, she became the youngest Chinese shooter to win an Asian Games championship. She also competed in the 10 metre air rifle competition and finished in sixth place during qualification. However, she did not advance to the final due to the Asian Games shooting regulations limiting a maximum of two athletes per National Olympic Committee (NOC). Her teammates, Wang and Han, already claimed China's two final spots.

In November 2026, she competed at the 2026 ISSF World Shooting Championships and won a gold medal in the 10 metre air rifle team event.
