= 2024 European 10 m Events Championships =

- Venue: Magvassy Mihály Sport Hall (finals); Audi Aréna (qualifications)
- Location: Győr, Hungary
- Dates: 24 February–3 March
- Competitors: 641 from 41 nations

The 2024 European 10 m Events Championships was held from 24 February to 3 March 2024 in Győr, Hungary. There are 8 places awarded at the 2024 Summer Olympics.

== Results ==
https://esc-shooting.org/storage/2024/03/02/89a113bbd80bed23e8ebba4df56263af4fadaf89.pdf

== Schedule ==
Finals schedule (Also Trio events for first time)

Date	Event
26 February	Air Pistol Mix Junior
26 February	Air Rifle Women Junior
26 February	Air Rifle Men Junior
27 February	Air Rifle Mix Junior
27 February	Air Pistol Women Junior
27 February	Air Pistol Men Junior
28 February	Team Air Pistol Men Junior
28 February	Team Air Pistol Women Junior
28 February	Team Air Rifle Men Junior
28 February	Team Air Rifle Women Junior

Date	Event
29 February	Air Rifle Mix
29 February	Air Pistol Women
29 February	Air Pistol Men
1 March	Air Pistol Mix
1 March	Air Rifle Women
1 March	Air Rifle Men
2 March	Team Air Pistol Men
2 March	Team Air Pistol Women
2 March	Team Air Rifle Men
2 March	Team Air Rifle Women

== Medalists ==
=== Medal table ===
* Host nation (Hungary)

Rank	Nation	Gold	Silver	Bronze	Total
1	Germany	8	2	5	15
2	Ukraine	4	4	2	10
3	Hungary	3	2	4	9
4	Norway	3	2	1	6
5	Georgia	3	1	0	4
6	Poland	1	3	2	6
7	Turkey	1	2	0	3
8	Austria	1	1	3	5
9	Italy	1	1	1	3
9	Serbia	1	1	1	3
11	Slovakia	1	1	0	2
12	Moldova	1	0	0	1
13	Romania	0	2	1	3
13	Sweden	0	2	1	3
15	Croatia	0	1	1	2
15	Switzerland	0	1	1	2
17	France	0	1	0	1
17	Slovenia	0	1	0	1
19	Azerbaijan	0	0	3	3
20	Bulgaria	0	0	1	1
20	Czech Republic	0	0	1	1
Totals (21 entries)		28	28	28	84

=== Seniors ===
Event	Gold	Silver	Bronze
Men
Air Pistol Men	Paolo Monna; Italy	Juraj Tužinský; Slovakia	Robin Walter; Germany
Air Rifle Men	Patrik Jány; Slovakia	István Péni; Hungary	Martin Strempfl; Austria
Team Air Pistol Men	Germany; Robin Walter; Michael Schwald; Paul Froehlich	Turkey; Yusuf Dikeç; İsmail Keleş; Buğra Selimzade	Ukraine; Oleh Omelchuk; Pavlo Korostylov; Viktor Bankin
Team Air Rifle Men	Norway; Jon-Hermann Hegg; Henrik Larsen; Ole Martin Halvorsen	Ukraine; Sviatoslav Hudzyi; Serhiy Kulish; Oleh Tsarkov	Croatia; Petar Gorša; Miran Maričić; Josip Sikavica
Women
Air Pistol Women	Anna Dulce; Moldova	Şimal Yılmaz; Turkey	Zorana Arunović; Serbia
Air Rifle Women	Anna Janssen; Germany	Julia Piotrowska; Poland	Audrey Gogniat; Switzerland
Team Air Pistol Women	Hungary; Sara Rahel Fabian; Miriam Jákó; Veronika Major	Ukraine; Yuliia Isachenko; Viliena Bevz; Olena Kostevych	Poland; Klaudia Breś; Natalia Krol; Katarzyna Klepacz
Team Air Rifle Women	Germany; Anna Janssen; Anita Mangold; Larissa Wegner	Poland; Aneta Stankiewicz; Julia Piotrowska; Izabella Dudek	Hungary; Eszter Mészáros; Eszter Dénes; Gitta Bajos
Mixed
Air Pistol Mix	Ukraine; Olena Kostevych; Oleh Omelchuk	Austria; Sylvia Steiner; Richard Zechmeister	Germany; Doreen Vennekamp; Michael Schwald
Air Rifle Mix	Germany; Anna Janssen; Maximilian Ulbrich	France; Océanne Muller; Lucas Kryzs	Sweden; Isabelle Johansson; Marcus Madsen

=== Juniors ===
Event	Gold	Silver	Bronze
Men
Air Pistol Men	Ivan Rakitski; Poland	Andreas Köppl; Germany	Luca Joldea; Romania
Air Rifle Men	Bálint Kálmán; Hungary	Victor Lindgren; Sweden	Patrick Entner; Austria
Team Air Pistol Men	Ukraine; Maksym Himon; Ivan Martynov; Timur Pidhornyi	Romania; Luca Joldea; Levente Bucsias; Constantin Feraru	Bulgaria; Vladislav Kalmikov; Imran Garayev; Haji Musayev
Team Air Rifle Men	Austria; Patrick Entner; Johannes Kühn; Florian Gugele	Sweden; Victor Lindgren; Pontus Kallin; Frans Rasmusson	Italy; Tommaso Roberto; Edoardo Branchini; Luca Sbarbati
Women
Air Pistol Women	Mariami Prodiashvili; Georgia	Manja Slak; Slovenia	Olivia Ditta Domsits; Hungary
Air Rifle Women	Synnøve Berg; Norway	Alexia Tela; Switzerland	Mariia Stashko; Ukraine
Team Air Pistol Women	Georgia; Mariami Prodiashvili; Mariam Abramishvili; Salome Prodiashvili	Italy; Alessandra Fait; Federica Quattrocchi; Cristina Magnani	Germany; Celina Becker; Johanna Blenck; Lydia Vetter
Team Air Rifle Women	Serbia; Aleksandra Havran; Emilija Ponjavić; Ljiljana Cvetković	Norway; Martine Sve; Synnøve Berg; Caroline Finnestad Lund	Germany; Katrin Grabowski; Nele Stark; Theresa Luise Schnell
Mixed
Air Pistol Mix	Georgia; Mariami Prodiashvili; Giorgi Mumladze	Germany; Celina Becker; Eduard Baumeister	Azerbaijan; Leyli Aliyeva; Vladislav Kalmikov
Air Rifle Mix	Germany; Nele Stark; Justus Ott	Serbia; Aleksandra Havran; Aleksa Rakonjac	Germany; Katrin Grabowski; Nils Palberg

== Olympic quotas ==
Nation	Men's		Women's		Total
Nation	Pistol	Rifle	Pistol	Rifle	Total
France	1				1
Germany	1				1
Italy				1	1
Hungary		1			1
Moldova			1		1
Poland		1			1
Slovakia				1	1
Turkey			1		1
Total: 8 countries	2	2	2	2	8
