= Arnaud Gamaleri =

French sport shooter (born 2005)

Personal information
- Nationality: French
- Born: 27 February 2005 (age 21)

Sport
- Sport: Shooting
- Event: 25 meter rapid fire pistol
Medal record
Men's shooting
Representing France
World Championships
Gold medal – first place	2026 Doha	25 m rapid fire pistol team
World Junior Championships
Silver medal – second place	2024 Lima	25 m rapid fire pistol team
Silver medal – second place	2026 Suhl	25 m rapid fire pistol team
European Championships
Gold medal – first place	2024 Osijek	25 m rapid fire pistol team
Gold medal – first place	2025 Châteauroux	25 m rapid fire pistol
Gold medal – first place	2025 Châteauroux	25 m rapid fire pistol team

Arnaud Gamaleri (born 27 February 2005) is a French sport shooter competing in the 25 meter rapid fire pistol event.

== Career ==
In August 2025, he competed at the 2025 European Shooting Championships and won a gold medal in both the individual and team 25 metre rapid fire pistol events.

In June 2026, he competed at the 2026 ISSF Junior World Championships and won a silver medal in both the individual and team 25 metre rapid fire pistol events. In November 2026, he competed at the 2026 ISSF World Shooting Championships and won a gold medal in the 25 meter rapid fire pistol event, along with Clément Bessaguet and Jean Quiquampoix.
