= 2026 ISSF Junior World Championships =

- Location: Suhl, Germany
- Dates: 16 June – 26 June

The 2026 ISSF Junior World Championships in Suhl, Germany took place from 16 June to 26 June 2026. The championships included rifle, pistol, and shotgun events.

== Medal summary ==
https://www.issf-sports.org/competitions/3283

* Host nation (Germany)

Rank	Nation	Gold	Silver	Bronze	Total
1	India (IND)	7	8	9	24
2	Individual Neutral Athletes (AIN)	6	5	3	14
3	Italy (ITA)	6	2	2	10
4	Poland (POL)	4	1	0	5
5	Ukraine (UKR)	2	2	4	8
6	Kazakhstan (KAZ)	2	2	0	4
7	United States (USA)	2	1	3	6
8	Great Britain (GBR)	2	1	0	3
9	Switzerland (SUI)	2	0	2	4
10	Norway (NOR)	1	4	3	8
11	France (FRA)	1	3	0	4
12	Cyprus (CYP)	1	1	1	3
12	Germany (GER)*	1	1	1	3
14	China (CHN)	1	1	0	2
15	South Korea (KOR)	1	0	3	4
16	Spain (ESP)	0	2	0	2
17	Czech Republic (CZE)	0	1	3	4
18	Austria (AUT)	0	1	2	3
19	Turkey (TUR)	0	1	1	2
20	Bulgaria (BUL)	0	1	0	1
20	North Korea (PRK)	0	1	0	1
22	Chinese Taipei (TPE)	0	0	1	1
22	Mongolia (MGL)	0	0	1	1
Totals (23 entries)		39	39	39	117

== Results ==
=== Men ===
Event	Gold		Silver		Bronze	
10m air rifle	Pritam Kendre (IND)	251.3	Timofei Aleinikov (AIN)	250.9	Jens Oestli (NOR)	228.4
10m air rifle team	{{}} [[]] [[]] [[]]		{{}} [[]] [[]] [[]]		{{}} [[]] [[]] [[]]	
50m rifle 3 position	[[]] (25x17px)		[[]] (25x17px)		[[]] (25x17px)	
50m rifle 3 position team	{{}} [[]] [[]] [[]]		{{}} [[]] [[]] [[]]		{{}} [[]] [[]] [[]]	
50m rifle prone	[[]] (25x17px)		[[]] (25x17px)		[[]] (25x17px)	
50m rifle prone team	{{}} [[]] [[]] [[]]		{{}} [[]] [[]] [[]]		{{}} [[]] [[]] [[]]	
10m air pistol	[[]] (25x17px)		[[]] (25x17px)		[[]] (25x17px)	
10m air pistol team	India; Umesh Choudhary; Mukesh Nelavalli; Parmod Parmod	1726	Romania; Luca Joldea; Levente Matyas Bucsias; Constantin-Daniel Feraru	1716	Italy; Matteo Mastrovalerio; Luca Arrighi; Gabriele Aldo Villani	1707
25m rapid Fire pistol	Yao Jianan (CHN)	31	Yan Chesnel (FRA)	23	Tomasz Jedraszczyk (POL)	20
25m rapid Fire pistol team	India; Raajwardan Paatil; Mukesh Nelavalli; Harsimar Singh Rattha	1722	France; Yan Chesnel; Arnaud Gamaleri; Hervé-Louis Le Guellaff Dumas	1701	Poland; Tomasz Jedraszczyk; Ivan Rakitski; Stanisław Franciszeh Nowosadko	1701
25m pistol	Mukesh Nelavalli (IND)	585	Suraj Sharma (IND)	583	Vladyslav Medushevskyi (UKR)	580
25m pistol team	India; Mukesh Nelavalli; Suraj Sharma; Pradhyumn Singh	1729	Poland; Tomasz Jedraszczyk; Ivan Rakitski; Wiktor Lukasz Kopiwoda	1726	Italy; Matteo Mastrovalerio; Gabriele Aldo Villani; Luca Arrighi	1712
25m standard pistol	Suraj Sharma (IND)	571	Ivan Rakitski (POL)	568	Mukesh Nelavalli (IND)	568
50m pistol	Imran Garayev (AZE)	552	Luca Joldea (ROU)	550	Mukesh Nelavalli (IND)	548
Trap	Andrés García (ESP)	347	Hussein Daruich (BRA)	39	Thomas Agez (FRA)	30
Trap team	Italy; Luca Gerri; Riccardo Mirabile; Matteo Dambrosi	349	Great Britain; William James Gilbert; Thomas William Betts; Robert Lewis	344	Spain; Andrés García; Cesar Moreno Rufo; Eduard Salichs	339
Skeet	Marco Coco (ITA)	34	[[]] (CYP)	33	[[]] (CYP)	30
Skeet team	United States; Benjamin Joseph Keller; Joshua Corbin; Jordan Douglas Sapp	349	Italy; Matteo Bragalli; Marco Coco; Antonio La Volpe	341	Greece; Panagiotis Gerochristos; Efraim Nikolantonakis; Andreas Despotopoulos	337

=== Women ===
Event	Gold		Silver		Bronze	
10m air rifle	[[]] (25x17px)		[[]] (25x17px)		[[]] (25x17px)	
10m air rifle team	India; Gautami Bhanot; Shambhavi Shravan Kshirsagar; Anushka Thokur	894.8; QWRJ	United States; Katie Lorraine Zaun; Emme Walrath; Mackenzie Ann Kring	881.8	Norway; Pernille Nor-Woll; Synnoeve Berg; Caroline Finnestad Lund	876.7
50m rifle 3 positionref	Synnøve Berg (NOR)	458.4	Caroline Finnestad Lund (NOR)	458.3	Khushi Khushi (IND)	447.3
50m rifle 3 position team	Czech Republic; Kateřina Mikulčíková; Barbora Dubská; Veronika Blažíčková	1763; QWRJ	Norway; Pernille Nor-Woll; Synnøve Berg; Caroline Finnestad Lund	1762	Switzerland; Ekaterina Chenikova; Vivien Joy Jaeggi; Emely Jaeggi	1761
50m rifle prone	Caroline Finnestad Lund (NOR)	626.3	Alexandra Rosenlew (FIN)	625.8	Veronika Blažíčková (CZE)	623.1
50m rifle prone team	Norway; Caroline Finnestad Lund; Pernille Nor-Woll; Synnøve Berg	1864.5	Switzerland; Emely Jaeggi; Ekaterina Chenikova; Vivien Joy Jaeggi	1860.8	Czech Republic; Veronika Blažíčková; Kateřina Mikulčíková; Adéla Zrůstová	1857.7'
10m air pistol	Chen Yu-Chun (TPE)	239.8	Manja Slak (SLO)	236.6	Kanak (IND)	217
10m air pistol team	India; Kanishka Dagar; Lakshita Lakshita; Anjali Chaudhary	1708	Azerbaijan; Zeynab Sultanova; Leyli Aliyeva; Sofiya Barhalova	1707	Ukraine; Viliena Bevz; Olga Lepska; Yuliia Isachenko	1704
25m pistol	Divanshi Divanshi (IND)	35	Cristina Magnani (ITA)	33	Heloise Fourre (FRA)	30
25m pistol team	India; Divanshi Divanshi; Tejaswani Tejaswani; Vibhuti Bhatia	1711	Czech Republic; Klára Ticháčková; Viktorie Šindlerová; Anna Miřejovská	1696	Germany; Lydia Vetter; Maxi Vogt; Johanna Blenck	1696
25m standard pistol	Divanshi Divanshi (IND)	564	Parisha Gupta (IND)	559	Manvi Jain (IND)	557
50m pistol	Miriam Jako (HUN)	546; WRJ	Parisha Gupta (IND)	540	Sofiya Barkhalova (AZE)	535
Trap	Maria Teresa Giorgi Maccioni (ITA)	39	Noelia Pontes Villarrubia (ESP)	38	Sofia Gori (ITA)	29
Trap team	Italy; Sofia Gori; Maria Teresa Giorgi Maccioni; Marika Patera	341	Great Britain; Madeleine Louise Purser; Hollie Annie Lumsden; Leah Southall	324	Spain; Noelia Pontes Villarrubia; Irene del Rey Ruiz; Africa Baena Sedano	322
Skeet	Madeleine Zarina Russell (GBR)	51	Gracelynn Marie Hensley (USA)	48	Arianna Nember (ITA)	38
Skeet team	Italy; Arianna Nember; Viola Picciolli; Eleonora Ruta	326	Germany; Emilie Bundan; Hannah Middel; Annabella Hettmer	325	United States; Gracelynn Marie Hensley; Madeline Helen Corbin; Alishia Fayth Layne	323

=== Mixed ===
Event	Gold	Silver	Bronze
10m air rifle team	{{}} [[]] [[]]	{{}} [[]] [[]]	{{}} [[]] [[]]
10m air pistol team	{{}} [[]] [[]]	{{}} [[]] [[]]	{{}} [[]] [[]]
Trap team	{{}} [[]] [[]]	{{}} [[]] [[]]	{{}} [[]] [[]]
Skeet team	{{}} [[]] [[]]	{{}} [[]] [[]]	{{}} [[]] [[]]
