= Vivien Jäggi =

Swiss sport shooter (born 2006)

Personal information
- Nationality: Swiss
- Born: 9 April 2006 (age 20)

Sport
- Sport: Shooting
- Events: 50 meter rifle three positions 50 meter rifle prone
Medal record
Women's shooting
Representing Switzerland
World Championships
Gold medal – first place	2026 Doha	50 m rifle prone team
Silver medal – second place	2025 Cairo	50 m rifle 3 positions team
Silver medal – second place	2026 Doha	50 m rifle 3 positions team
World Junior Championships
Gold medal – first place	2023 Changwon	50 m rifle 3 positions
Gold medal – first place	2023 Changwon	50 m rifle 3 positions team
Silver medal – second place	2026 Suhl	50 m rifle prone team
Silver medal – second place	2023 Changwon	50 m rifle prone team
Bronze medal – third place	2026 Suhl	50 m rifle 3 positions team

Vivien Joy Jäggi (born 9 April 2006) is a Swiss sport shooter.

== Career ==
In November 2025, Jäggi competed at the 2025 ISSF World Shooting Championships and won a silver medal in the 50 metre rifle 3 positions team event. She again competed at the 2026 ISSF World Shooting Championships and won a gold medal in the 50 metre rifle prone team event, along with Chiara Leone and Emely Jäggi. She also won a silver medal in the 50 metre rifle three positions team event, with a score of 1,761 points, three points short of world champion Norway team. She contributed the team's second-best score with 587 points.

== Personal life ==
Jäggi's younger sister, Emely Jäggi, is also a sport shooter.
