= Shardul Vihan =

Indian sport shooter

Personal information
- Nationality: Indian
- Born: 11 January 2003 (age 23) Meerut, India
- Education: Dayawati Modi Academy, Meerut
- Height: 6’0 ft
- Weight: 75 kg (165 lb)

Sport
- Country: India
- Sport: Shooting
- Event: Double trap, Olympic Trap
Medal record
Representing India
Men's Double Trap, Olympic Trap
World Shotgun Championships
Gold medal – first place	2017 Moscow	Double Trap Jr Team
Bronze medal – third place	2018 Changwon	Double Trap Sr Team
Asian Games
Silver medal – second place	2018 Jakarta	Double Trap Sr Men
World Junior Championships
Bronze medal – third place	2024 Lima	Mixed Trap team

Shardul Vihan (born 11 January 2003) is an Indian sport shooter. He won the silver medal at the 2018 Asian Games in Men's Double Trap at age 15.
