= Océanne Muller =

French sports shooter (born 2003)

Personal information
- Nationality: French
- Born: 2 January 2003 (age 23)

Sport
- Sport: Sports shooting
Medal record
World Championships
Bronze medal – third place	2023 Baku	10m air rifle mixed team
European Games
Bronze medal – third place	2023 Kraków-Małopolska	10 m air rifle
European Championships
Silver medal – second place	2024 Győr	10 m air rifle mixed team
Mediterranean Games
Gold medal – first place	2022 Oran	10 m air rifle
Gold medal – first place	2022 Oran	Mixed 10 m air rifle team
World Junior Championships
Silver medal – second place	2023 Changwon	Mixed 10 m air rifle team
Gold medal – first place	2024 Lima	10m air rifle
Silver medal – second place	2024 Lima	Mixed 10 m air rifle team

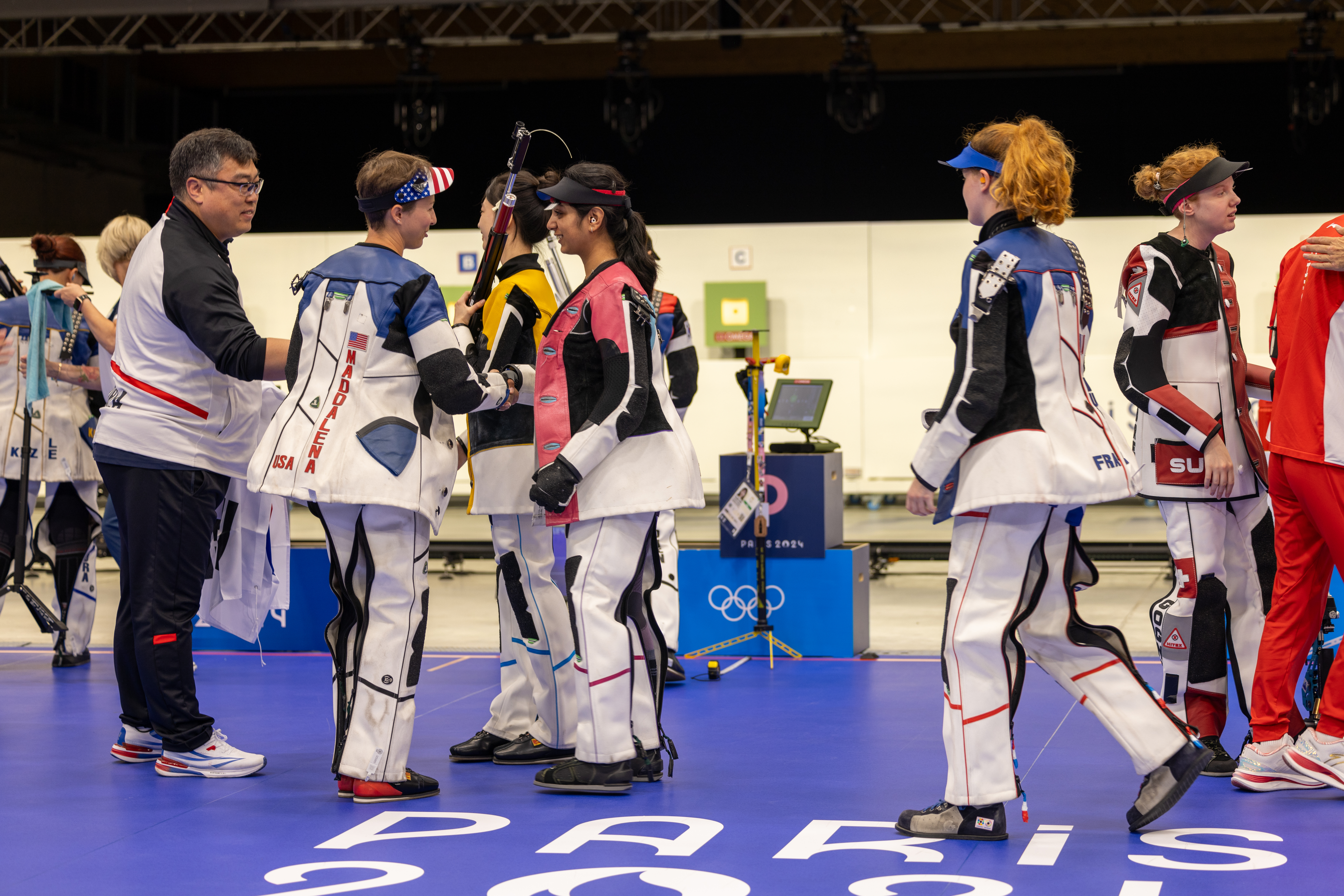
Océanne Muller at the 2024 Summer Olympics 10m air rifle final

Océanne Muller (born 2 January 2003) is a French sports shooter. She competed in the women's 10 metre air rifle event at the 2020 Summer Olympics, finishing in fifth place. She won two gold medals at the 2022 Mediterranean Games held in Oran, Algeria.
