= Wang Zifei =

Chinese sport shooter (born 2007)

Personal information
- Born: 9 March 2007 (age 19) Hangzhou, Zhejiang, China

Sport
- Country: China
- Sport: Shooting
- Events: 10 metre air rifle; 50 metre rifle three positions

Achievements and titles
- Highest world ranking: 1 (10 metre air rifle)
Medal record
Women's shooting
Representing China
World Championships
Silver medal – second place	2025 Cairo	10m Air Rifle
Gold medal – first place	2025 Cairo	10m Air Rifle Mixed
Gold medal – first place	2025 Cairo	10m Air Rifle Team
Gold medal – first place	2025 Cairo	50m 3-Position Rifle Team
Gold medal – first place	2026 Doha	10m Air Rifle Team
Gold medal – first place	2026 Doha	10m Air Rifle Mixed
Bronze medal – third place	2026 Doha	10 m air rifle
Junior World Championships
Gold medal – first place	2024 Lima	10m Air Rifle
Gold medal – first place	2024 Lima	10m Air Rifle Mixed Team
Silver medal – second place	2023 Changwon	10m Air Rifle
Gold medal – first place	2023 Changwon	10m Air Rifle Team
Gold medal – first place	2023 Changwon	50m Prone Rifle Team
World Cup Finals
Gold medal – first place	2025 Doha	10m Air Rifle
Asian Games
Gold medal – first place	2026 Aichi–Nagoya	10m air rifle team
Gold medal – first place	2026 Aichi–Nagoya	10m air rifle mixed team
Gold medal – first place	2026 Aichi–Nagoya	50 m rifle 3 positions team

Wang Zifei (Chinese: 王子菲, born 9 March 2007) is a Chinese sports shooter specialising in ISSF 10 meter air rifle. She won the silver medal at the 2025 World Championships. She won the 2025 ISSF World Cup Final, having also won three of the four qualifying legs and setting a new world record. As of August 2026 she was ranked World Number 1 for Women's 10m Air Rifle.

== Career ==
Wang's first international appearance was at the 2023 ISSF Junior World Championships in Changwon where she won silver in the Junior Women's 10M air rifle and two golds in team events. At the 2024 ISSF Junior World Championships in Lima, she won gold in the individual and mixed pairs air rifle events and set a new world record.

Although only 18, she began shooting at a senior level in 2025, winning gold on her World Cup debut in Buenos Aires. She ultimately won gold at three of the four matches on the 2025 World Cup circuit. At the second leg in Lima, she set a new world record. She won the 2025 World Cup Final in Doha. She also won three World Cup medals in the Mixed Team events, paired twice with Song Buhan and once with Sheng Lihao.

In July 2025 she was ranked world number 1 in women's 10m air rifle.

At the 2025 ISSF World Shooting Championships in Cairo, Zifei won four medals. She took individual air rifle silver and three team event golds - Women's team 10m air rifle and 50metre 3-position rifle, as well as the mixed team air rifle - again paired with Sheng Lihao.

At the 2025 National Games of China in Guangdong she won individual and team golds for air rifle with Han Jiayu and Huang Yuting. She won a third gold medal in the 50m rifle 3-position pairs, teamed with Zhao Zhonghao.

As of August 2026, Zifei had won five medals on the 2026 ISSF World Cup Circuit, consisting of individual gold and bronze, and three gold mixed team medals paired with Lihao.
