= Synnøve Berg =

Norwegian sport shooter (born 2007)

Personal information
- Born: 19 June 2007 (age 19) Lørenskog, Norway

Sport
- Country: Norway
- Sport: Shooting
- Club: Kisen
Medal record
World Championships
Gold medal – first place	2026 Doha	50 m rifle 3 positions ream
Silver medal – second place	2026 Doha	50 m rifle prone ream
ISSF Junior World Championships
Gold medal – first place	2023 Changwon	10 m air rifle
Gold medal – first place	2024 Lima	50 m rifle 3 position
Gold medal – first place	2024 Lima	50 m rifle prone team
Silver medal – second place	2024 Lima	50 m rifle 3 position team
Bronze medal – third place	2023 Changwon	10 m air rifle team
Bronze medal – third place	2024 Lima	10 m air rifle team
European Championships
Gold medal – first place	2024 Győr	10 m air rifle junior
Gold medal – first place	2026 Yerevan	10 m air rifle team
Silver medal – second place	2023 Tallinn	10 m rifle team junior
Silver medal – second place	2024 Győr	10 m rifle team junior

Synnøve Berg (born 19 June 2007) is a Norwegian sport shooter. Her achievements include winning individual gold medals at both the ISSF Junior World Championships and the European Shooting Championships, junior class. She qualified for and was selected to represent Norway at the 2024 Summer Olympics.

== Biography ==
Born on 19 June 2007, Berg represents the club Kisen Miniatyrskytterlag. As of 2024, she is a student at the sports academy Norges Toppidrettsgymnas in Kongsvinger.

=== 2023 ===
Winning gold medal in 10 m air rifle at the 2023 ISSF Junior World Championships in Changwon in July 2023, Berg was the first Norwegian woman to win this title.

=== 2024 ===
At the 2024 European 10 m Events Championships in Győr in February 2024, Berg won a gold medal in air rifle women juniors.

At the 2024 ISSF Qualification Tournament in Rio de Janeiro, her result qualified for adding to the Norwegian quota for the 2024 Olympics. She was selected to compete at the 2024 Summer Olympics in Paris, along with five other Norwegian shooters. She was set to compete both individually and in the mixed team event. Her first competition in the Olympics was in mixed air rifle team with teammate Ole Martin Halvorsen.
