= Caroline Finnestad Lund =

Norwegian sport shooter (born 2004)

Personal information
- Nationality: Norwegian
- Born: 23 December 2004 (age 21)

Sport
- Sport: Shooting
- Events: 50 meter rifle three positions 50 meter rifle prone
Medal record
Women's shooting
Representing Norway
World Championships
Gold medal – first place	2026 Doha	50 m rifle prone
Gold medal – first place	2026 Doha	50 m rifle 3 positions team
Silver medal – second place	2026 Doha	50 m rifle prone team
World Junior Championships
Gold medal – first place	2024 Lima	50 m rifle prone
Gold medal – first place	2024 Lima	50 m rifle prone team
Gold medal – first place	2026 Suhl	50 m rifle prone
Gold medal – first place	2026 Suhl	50 m rifle prone team
Silver medal – second place	2024 Lima	50 m rifle 3 positions
Silver medal – second place	2024 Lima	50 m rifle 3 positions team
Silver medal – second place	2026 Suhl	50 m rifle 3 positions
Silver medal – second place	2026 Suhl	50 m rifle 3 positions team
Bronze medal – third place	2023 Changwon	10 m air rifle team
Bronze medal – third place	2023 Changwon	50 m rifle prone
Bronze medal – third place	2023 Changwon	50 m rifle prone team
Bronze medal – third place	2024 Lima	10 m air rifle team
Bronze medal – third place	2026 Suhl	10 m air rifle team

Caroline Finnestad Lund (born 23 December 2004) is a Norwegian sport shooter.

== Career ==
In November 2026, she competed at the 2026 ISSF World Shooting Championships and won a gold medal in the 50 metre rifle prone event with a score of 628.2 points. She also won a gold medal in the 50 metre rifle three positions team event. She then won a silver medal in the 50 metre rifle prone team event.

== Personal life ==
Lund is the daughter of Tor Harald Lund and Mette Elisabeth Finnestad. Both of her parents are former sport shooters.
