= Elizabeth Callahan =

American sport shooter

Libby Callahan
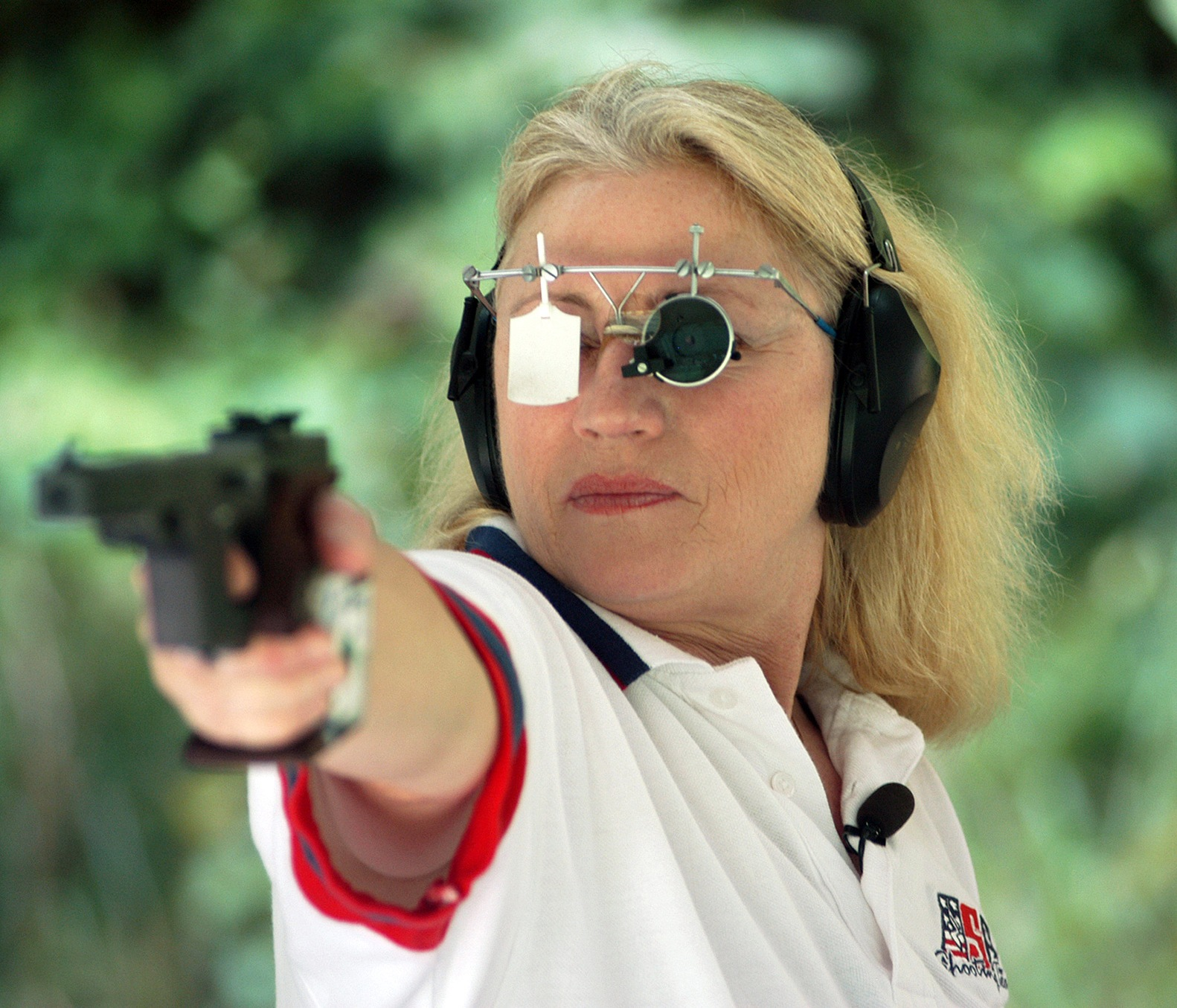
- Callahan competing at the 2008 Olympics

Personal information
- Full name: Elizabeth Callahan
- Born: February 25, 1952 (age 74) Columbia, South Carolina, U.S.
- Height: 5 ft 2 in (1.57 m)
- Weight: 141 lb (64 kg)

Sport
- Sport: Shooting
- Event(s): 10 m air pistol (AP40); 25 m pistol (SP)
- Coached by: Sergey Luzov
Medal record
Representing the United States
Pan American Games
Gold medal – first place	1999 Winnipeg	25 m pistol
Silver medal – second place	1991 Havana	10 m air pistol

Elizabeth "Libby" Callahan (born February 25, 1952) is an American sport shooter. She is a four-time Olympian, and a two-time medalist for pistol shooting at the Pan American Games (1991 in Havana, Cuba and 1999 in Winnipeg, Manitoba, Canada). She also worked as a police officer in Washington, D.C. for almost three decades, before retiring in 2003.

== Shooting career ==
Callahan, born in Columbia, South Carolina, started out her sporting career in 1980, when she learned shooting with the Metropolitan Police Department in Washington D.C. She went on to become a five-time women's police revolver champion in various local competitions, until she took up international, Olympic-style shooting, after joining the U.S. Army reserve in 1985. Three years later, Callahan became a member of the U.S. national shooting team, and had achieved numerous titles and top-ten finishes at the USA Shooting National Championships. She captured three more medals (one silver and two bronze) in air and pistol shooting at the 1992, 2001, and 2005 ISSF World Cup series. She also competed for all pistol shooting events at the 1992 Summer Olympics in Barcelona, 1996 Summer Olympics in Atlanta, Georgia, and 2004 Summer Olympics in Athens, but she neither reached the final round, nor claimed an Olympic medal.

Sixteen years after competing in her first Olympics, Callahan qualified for her fourth U.S. shooting team at the 2008 Summer Olympics in Beijing, by winning the sport pistol from the U.S. Olympic Team Trials in Fort Benning, Georgia. At age fifty-six, Callahan also held her distinction of being the oldest female and most experienced member of the U.S. Olympic team, and consequently, surpassed the record set by equestrian rider Kyra Downton (who competed as a 55-year-old at the 1968 Summer Olympics in Mexico City). She competed only in the women's 25 m pistol, where she was able to shoot 287 targets in the precision stage, and 288 in the rapid fire, for a total score of 575 points, finishing only in twenty-fifth place.

== Coaching career ==
As of 2024 she coaches Ohio State University's shooting team, and one of her students is 2024 Olympian Ada Korkhin.

== Olympic results ==
Event	1992	1996	2004	2008
25 metre pistol	—	23rd 573	19th 575	25th 575
10 metre air pistol	37th 372	—	30th 374	—
