= 2023 ISSF Junior World Championships =

Shooting event in Changwon, South Korea

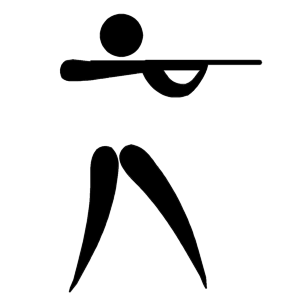
- Location: Changwon, South Korea
- Dates: 14 July – 25 July 2023

The 2023 ISSF Junior World Championships was the third edition of the championships, held in Changwon, South Korea for Rifle, Pistol, and Shotgun from 14 July to 25 July.

== Schedule ==
Date	Event
16 July	10m Air Pistol Men Junior, 10m Air Pistol Women Junior
17 July	10m Air Rifle Mixed Team Junior, 10m Air Pistol Mixed Team Junior
18 July	10m Air Rifle Men Junior, Skeet Women Junior, Skeet Men Junior, 10m Air Rifle Women Junior
19 July	25m Pistol Women Junior, Skeet Mixed Team Junior, 50m Rifle 3 Positions Men Junior
20 July	50m Rifle 3 Positions Women Junior
21 July	25m Rapid Fire Pistol Men Junior
22 July	10m Running Target Men Junior, 10m Running Target Women Junior
23 July	Trap Women Junior, Trap Men Junior
24 July	Trap Mixed Team Junior, 50m Pistol

== Results ==
=== Men ===
Event	Gold		Silver		Bronze	
10m Air Rifle	Romain Aufrere (FRA)	251.2	Honghao Wang (CHN)	251.0	Umamahesh Maddineni (IND)	229.0
10m Air Rifle Team	India; Abhinav Shaw; Srikanth Dhanush; Parth Rakesh Mane	1886.7	China; Mingshuai Zhu; Yishun Ye; Yuchen Shen	1883.5	South Korea; Daehan Choe; Junyeong oh Hyunjoon Shin	1873.9
50m Rifle 3 Position	Romain Aufrere (FRA)	459.9	Jens Olsrud Oestli (NOR)	457.4	Yishun Ye (CHN)	446.4
50m Rifle 3 Position Team	Poland; Michal Chojnowski; Wiktor Sajdak; Maciej Ogorek	1745 =WRJ	China; Yiming Mao; Wenxing Xia; Maaodong Chen	1743	Italy; Michele Bernardi; Luca Sbarbati; Gabriele Biondi	1738
50m Rifle Prone	Jens Olsrud Oestli (NOR)	625.0	Michal Chojnowski (POL)	624.2	Braden Wayne Peiser (USA)	623.2
50m Rifle Prone Team	Hungary; Ferenc Toeroek; Andras Denes; Peter Antal Wittmann	1863.2	Poland; Michal Chojnowski; Wiktor Sajdak; Maciej Ogorek	1859.9	United States; Braden Wayne Peiser; Tyler Wee; Gavin Raymond Leigh Barnick	1859.0
10m Air Pistol	Shubham Bisla (IND)	244.6	Shuaihang Bu (CHN)	239.6	Kanghyun Kim (KOR)	218.2
10m Air Pistol Team	China; Yu Zhang; Kecheng Chen; Shuaihang Bu	1733	India; Shubham Bisla; Amit Sharma; Abhinav Choudhary	1727	South Korea; Kanghyun Kim; Seungho Song; Dohoon Kim	1718
25m Rapid Fire Pistol	Shiwen Wang (CHN)	582+29	Theo Moczko (FRA)	577+26	Seoyeong Yoon (KOR)	581+22
25m Rapid Fire Pistol Team	China; Zhihao Zhang; Shujie Chai; Aobo Chen	1747 =WRJ	India; Mahesh Pasupathy Anandakumar; Sameer Sameer; Rajkanwar Singh Sandhu	1730	France; Theo Moczko; Yan Chesnel; Romain Zunino	1719
25m Pistol	Nikita Chiryukin (KAZ)	583	Zhihao Zhang (CHN)	583	Sukjin Hong (KOR)	583
25m Pistol Team	China; Zhihao Zhang; Aobo Chen; Shujie Chai	1727	South Korea; Sukjin Hong; Doyeop Kim; Dongjun Kim	1725	Italy; Luca Arrighi; Matteo Mastovalerio; Liang Xi Savanori	1716
25m Standard Pistol	Sukjin Hong (KOR)	578	Nikita Chiryukin (KAZ)	572	Shiwen Wang (CHN)	571
25m Standard Pistol Team	China; Zhihao Zhang; Aobo Chen; Shujie Chai	1683	South Korea; Sukjin Hong; Minsoo Kim; Geonwoo Son	1679	India; Unish Holinder; Randeep Sing; Akshay Kumar	1671
50m Pistol	Kamaljeet (IND)	544	Veniamin Nikitin (UZB)	542	Taemin Kim (KOR)	541
10m Running Target	Roman Chadai (UKR)		Aaro Juhani Vuorimaa (FIN)		Denys Marynenko (UKR)	
10m Running Target Team	Ukraine; Roman Chadai; Denys Marynenko; Kyrylo Itulin	1669	Kazakhstan; Assadbek Nazirkulyev; Ilya Zoteyev; Daniil Yankovenko	1657	Finland; Aaro Juhani Vuorimaa; Toni Kristian Annala; William Erik Wilkman	1611
Trap	Matteo Dambrosi (ITA)	45 (14)	Andres Garcia (ESP)	45 (13)	Emanuele Iezzi (ITA)	33
Trap Team	Italy; Matteo Dambrosi; Emanuele Iezzi; Gianmarco Barletta	356	India; Makhtyaruddin Mohamadmuzahid Malek; Shardul Vihan; Arya Vansh Tyagi	346	Spain; Andres Garcia; Daniel Fernandez De Vincente; Juan Antonio Garcia	339
Skeet	Benjamin Joseph Keller (USA)	54 (7)	Markos Kontopoulos (CYP)	54 (5)	Andrea Galardini (ITA)	42
Skeet Team	Italy; Andrea Galardini; Francesco Bernardini; Marco Coco	350	United States; Benjamin Joseph Keller; Joshua Corbin; Jordan Douglas Sapp	349	Cyprus; Andreas Pontikis; Theodoros Ioannides; Varnavas Theodorou	348

=== Women ===
Event	Gold		Silver		Bronze	
10m Air Rifle	Synnoeve Berg (NOR)	251.8	Zifei Wang (CHN)	251.3	Ruoxuan Jiao (CHN)	229.7
10m Air Rifle Team	China; Zifei Wang; Xinyi Fan; Jiale Zhang	1892.0 WRJ	India; Sonam Uttam Maskar; Gautami Bhanot; Swati Chowdhury	1886.8	Norway; Synnoeve Berg; Pernille Nor-Woll; Caroline Finnestad Lund	1883.8
50m Rifle 3 Position	Vivien Jäggi (SUI)	457.3	Arina Altukhova (KAZ)	455.7	Emely Jäggi (SUI)	445.0
50m Rifle 3 Position Team	Switzerland; Vivien Jäggi; Emely Jäggi; Audrey Gogniat	1758	Germany; Nele Stark; Anna Marie Beutler; Hannah Wehren	1757	United States; Elizabeth Prost Rocha; Katie Lorraine Zun; Alivia Marie Perkins	1751
50m Rifle Prone	Xiaoxue Li (CHN)	626.2	Emely Jäggi (SUI)	624.5	Caroline Finnestad Lund (NOR)	624.2
50m Rifle Prone Team	China; Xiaoxue Li; Zifei Wang; Shuang Luo	1866.8 WRJ	Switzerland; Vivien Jäggi; Emely Jäggi; Jennifer Kocher	1864.1	Norway; Synnoeve Berg; Pernille Nor-Woll; Caroline Finnestad Lund	1863.0
10m Air Pistol	Sainyam Sainyam (IND)	242.2	Oh Ye-jin (KOR)	239.4	Qianxun Yao (CHN)	218.6
10m Air Pistol Team	China; Qianxun Yao; Siyu Wang; Yiyao Shen	1724 WRJ	South Korea; Oh Ye-jin; Juri Kim; Yeonwoo Heo	1722	India; Sainyam Sainyam; Urva Chaudhary; Anjali Chaudhary	1718
25m Pistol	Qingyi Zuo (CHN)	587+34	Minseo Kim (KOR)	581+30	Ada Claudia Korkhin (USA)	579+28
25m Pistol Team	South Korea; Jiin Yang; Minseo Kim; Dajung Nam	1743 WRJ	China; Xiaoya Liang; Zizhao Luo; Shushan Wu	1740	Hungary; Miriam Jako; Sara Rahel Fabian; Olivia Ditta Domsits	1723
25m Standard Pistol	Shushan Wu (CHN)	566	Minseo Kim (KOR)	559	Chaeeun Won (KOR)	556
25m Standard Pistol Team	South Korea; Jeongeun Kim; Minseo Kim; Dajung Nam	1665	China; Xiaoya Liang; Zizhao Luo; Shushan Wu	1649	India; Yashita Shokeen; Prarthana Khanna; Tiyana Tiyana	1573
50m Pistol	Khanna Aliyeva (AZE)	520	Tiyana Tiyana (IND)	519	Leyli Aliyeva (AZE)	510
10m Running Target	Marharyta Tarkanii (UKR)		Fatima Irnazarova (KAZ)		Alina Tkalyk (UKR)	
Trap	Ryann Paige Phillips (USA)	45	Giorgia Lenticchia (ITA)	42	Carey Jeana Garrison (USA)	33
Trap Team	United States; Ryann Paige Phillips; Carey Jeana Garrison; Kaleigh Christine Castillo	337	Italy; Giorgia Lenticchia; Elena Navelli; Sofia Littame	325	China; Yuxin Lin; Yinuo Zhi; Zixi Zhang	314
Skeet	Miroslava Hockova (SVK)	51 (2)	Raiza Dhillon (IND)	51 (1)	Alishia Fayth Layne (USA)	41
Skeet Team	Slovakia; Miroslava Hockova; Adriana Zajickova; Dominika Valkova	330	Italy; Sara Bongini; Viola Picciolli; Damiana Paolacci	328	United States; Alishia Fayth Layne; Madeline Helen Corbin; Jessi Griffin	327

=== Mixed ===
Event	Gold	Silver	Bronze
10m Air Rifle Team	India; Gautami Bhanot; Abhinav Shaw	France; Oceanne Muller; Romain Aufrere	China; Jiale Zhang; Mingshuai Zhu
10m Air Pistol Team	China; Siyu Wang; Shuaihang Bu	China; Qianxun Yao; Yu Zhang	India; Sainyam Sainyam; Abhinav Choudhary
Trap Team	United States; William Browning; Carey Jeana Garrison	Great Britain; Thomas William Betts; Madeleine Louise Purser	China; Zeming Du; Yuxin Lin
Skeet Team	Italy; Andrea Galardini; Sara Bongini	India; Harmehar Singh Lally; Sanjana Sood	United States; Benjamin Joseph Keller; Jessi Griffin

== Medal table ==
* Host nation (South Korea)

Rank	Nation	Gold	Silver	Bronze	Total
1	China (CHN)	12	9	7	28
2	India (IND)	6	6	5	17
3	Ukraine (UKR)	5	3	2	10
4	Kazakhstan (KAZ)	4	4	2	10
5	Italy (ITA)	4	3	4	11
6	United States (USA)	4	1	8	13
7	South Korea (KOR)*	3	6	8	17
8	France (FRA)	2	2	1	5
8	Switzerland (SUI)	2	2	1	5
10	Norway (NOR)	2	1	3	6
11	Slovakia (SVK)	2	0	0	2
12	Poland (POL)	1	2	0	3
13	Hungary (HUN)	1	0	1	2
14	Finland (FIN)	0	3	4	7
15	Uzbekistan (UZB)	0	2	0	2
16	Cyprus (CYP)	0	1	1	2
16	Spain (ESP)	0	1	1	2
18	Germany (GER)	0	1	0	1
18	Great Britain (GBR)	0	1	0	1
Totals (19 entries)		48	48	48	144

== Participants ==
A total of 552 competitors from the national teams of the following 44 countries was registered to compete at 2023 ISSF Junior World Championships.

- Australia (9)
- Austria (14)
- Azerbaijan (6)
- Brazil (2)
- Bulgaria (1)
- China (17)
- Croatia (3)
- Cyprus (4)
- Czech Republic (5)
- Spain (9)
- Estonia (2)
- Finland (18)
- France (13)
- Great Britain (15)
- Germany (18)
- Greece (2)
- Hungary (20)
- Indonesia (10)
- India (90)
- Israel (4)
- Italy (24)
- Japan (7)
- Kazakhstan (12)
- South Korea (66)
- Latvia (2)
- Lithuania (4)
- Mongolia (10)
- Norway (7)
- New Zealand (3)
- Oman (12)
- Poland (10)
- Qatar (8)
- Romania (4)
- Singapore (6)
- Slovenia (3)
- Sri Lanka (1)
- Switzerland (11)
- Slovakia (13)
- Chinese Taipei (8)
- Turkey (16)
- Ukraine (9)
- United States (43)
- Uzbekistan (10)
- Vietnam (1)
