= Anna Dulce =

Moldovan sports shooter (born 2005)

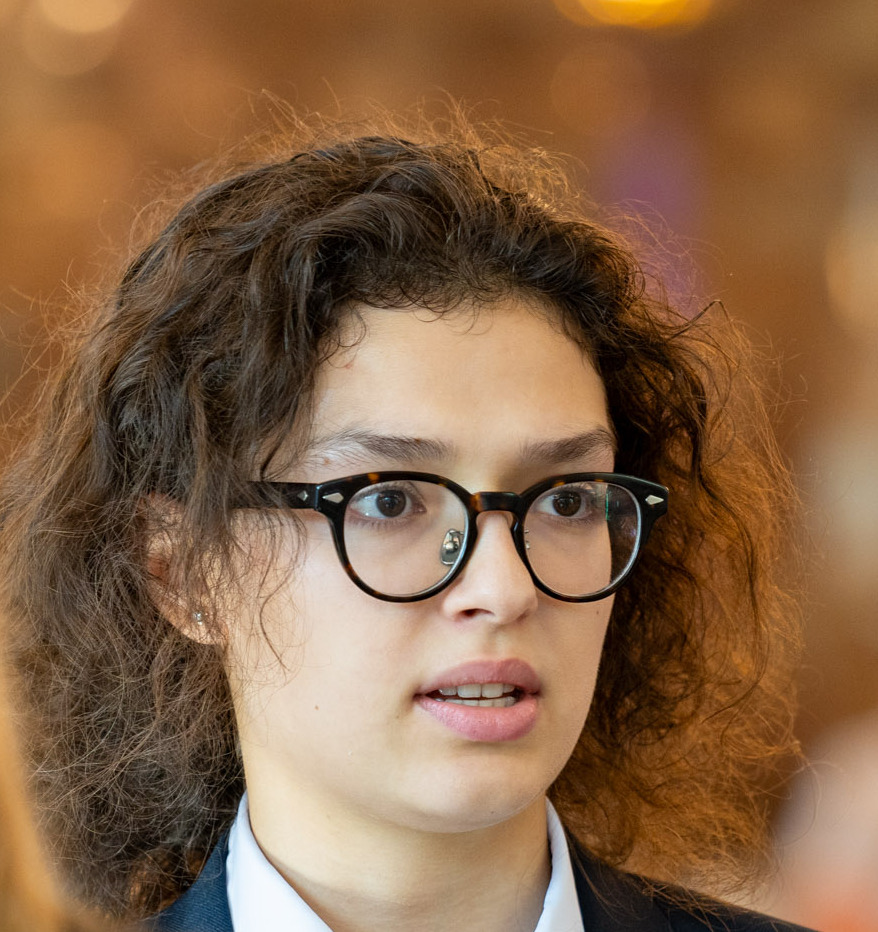

Personal information
- Born: 22 October 2005 (age 20) Chișinău, Moldova
- Height: 182 cm (6 ft 0 in)
- Weight: 66 kg (146 lb)

Sport
- Sport: Sports shooting
- Event: 10 m air pistol
Medal record
Women's Shooting
Representing Moldova
European Championships
Gold medal – first place	2024 Győr	10 m air pistol

Anna Dulce (born 22 October 2005) is a Moldovan sports shooter. She competed in the women's 10 metre air pistol event at the 2020 Summer Olympics, held July–August 2021 in Tokyo, Japan.
