= Emely Jäggi =

Swiss sport shooter (born 2008)

Personal information
- Nationality: Swiss
- Born: 13 October 2008 (age 18)

Sport
- Sport: Shooting
- Events: 50 meter rifle three positions 50 meter rifle prone
Medal record
Women's shooting
Representing Switzerland
World Championships
Gold medal – first place	2026 Doha	50 m rifle prone team
Silver medal – second place	2025 Cairo	50 m rifle 3 positions
Silver medal – second place	2025 Cairo	50 m rifle 3 positions team
Silver medal – second place	2025 Cairo	50 m rifle 3 positions team
European Championships
Gold medal – first place	2024 Osijek	50 m rifle 3 positions team
Gold medal – first place	2024 Osijek	50 m rifle 3 positions team
Bronze medal – third place	2024 Osijek	50 m rifle 3 positions
World Junior Championships
Gold medal – first place	2023 Changwon	50 m rifle 3 positions team
Silver medal – second place	2023 Changwon	50 m rifle prone
Silver medal – second place	2023 Changwon	50 m rifle prone team
Silver medal – second place	2026 Suhl	50 m rifle prone team
Bronze medal – third place	2023 Changwon	50 m rifle 3 positions
Bronze medal – third place	2026 Suhl	50 m rifle 3 positions team

Emely Jäggi (born 13 October 2008) is a Swiss sport shooter.

== Career ==
In April 2024, during the final Olympic qualifier in Rio de Janeiro, Jäggi finished in second in the 50 metre rifle 3 positions and earned a quota place for the 2024 Summer Olympics. At 15 years old, she would have become the youngest ever shooting sport Olympian, however, she missed selection to the Swiss team.

In November 2025, she competed at the 2025 ISSF World Shooting Championships and won silver medals in the 50 metre rifle 3 positions and 50 metre rifle 3 positions team events. She again competed at the 2026 ISSF World Shooting Championships and won a gold medal in the 50 metre rifle prone team event, along with Chiara Leone and Vivien Jäggi. She also won a silver medal in the 50 metre rifle three positions team event, with a score of 1,761 points, three points short of world champion Norway team. She contributed the team's best score with 590 points.

== Personal life ==
Jäggi's older sister, Vivien Jäggi, is also a sport shooter.
