= Victor Lindgren =

Swedish sports shooter (born 2003)

Personal information
- Full name: Victor Claes Rickard Lindgren
- Nationality: Swedish
- Born: 16 May 2003 (age 23) Sjöbo, Sweden

Sport
- Sport: Sports shooting
Medal record
Representing Sweden
Olympic Games
Silver medal – second place	2024 Paris	10m air rifle
World Championships
Gold medal – first place	2023 Baku	10m air rifle
Silver medal – second place	2025 Cairo	10m air rifle
European Championships
Silver medal – second place	2026 Yerevan	10 m air rifle
Silver medal – second place	2026 Yerevan	10 m air rifle team
Bronze medal – third place	2026 Yerevan	10 m air rifle mixed
World Junior Championships
Silver medal – second place	2024 Lima	50m rifle 3 position
Silver medal – second place	2024 Lima	50m rifle prone team
Bronze medal – third place	2024 Lima	50m rifle 3 position team
European Junior Championships
Silver medal – second place	2024 Győr	10 m air rifle team

Victor Claes Rickard Lindgren (born 16 May 2003) is a Swedish sports shooter. He won the gold medal in the 10m air rifle event at the 2023 ISSF World Shooting Championships. He won the silver medal in the 10m air rifle event at the 2024 Summer Olympics.

== Biography ==
Lindgren was born and raised in Sjöbo, Sweden. He moved to Sävsjö to attend the sports shooting programme at Riksidrottsgymnasiet, a sports-specialized high school.
