= Ada Korkhin =

American sport shooter

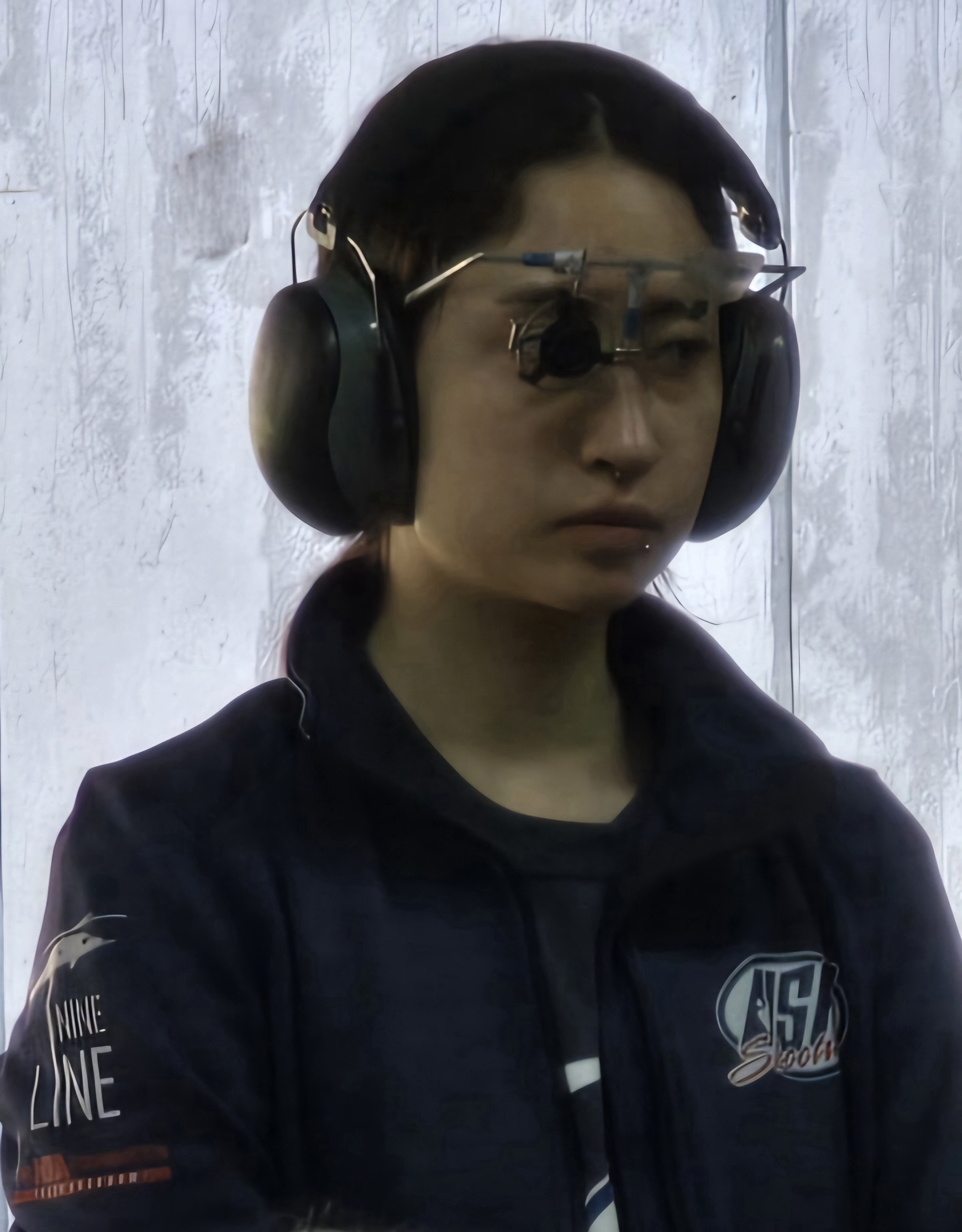
- Korkhin at the Paris 2024 Games

Personal information
- Full name: Ada Claudia Korkhin
- Born: November 24, 2004 (age 21) Boston, Massachusetts, U.S.

Sport
- Country: United States
- Sport: Shooting
- Event: 25 m pistol (SP)
- College team: Ohio State Buckeyes
- Club: Massachusetts Rifle Association
- Coached by: Libby Callahan, Emil Milev

Ada Claudia Korkhin (/ˈɑːdə ˈkɔːrxɪn/ AH-də KOR-khin; born November 24, 2004) is an American Olympic pistol shooter. She represented the United States at the 2024 Paris Olympics in Women's 25m Sport Pistol, at 19 years of age.

== Early life ==
Korkhin was born in Boston, Massachusetts, and is Jewish. Her parents are Yakov Korkhin, who is a dual US-Israeli citizen, and May Han. In 2016, she had her bat mitzvah at Temple Sinai in Brookline.

Korkhin graduated from the Edward Devotion School (now Florida Ruffin Ridley School) in 2019. She attended Brookline High School, and graduated in 2023. She now attends Ohio State University ('27) on an athletic scholarship, where she studies biochemistry.

== Pistol shooting career ==
=== Early years ===
She started pistol shooting at 9 years of age, introduced to air pistol by her father through the Junior Pistol Team of the Massachusetts Rifle Association, his longtime club in Woburn, Massachusetts, and the oldest active gun club in the United States. Korkhin began shooting sport pistol at age 12.

Korkhin practiced with an air pistol in her family's apartment, shooting from the kitchen through the living and dining rooms on a makeshift practice range. She competed in her first international competition in Germany, shortly after she graduated from middle school. She has only ever owned one gun.

The 2019 International Shooting Sport Federation (ISSF) Junior World Cup was her first international competition. At the 2021 ISSF Junior World Championship in Lima, Peru, Korkhin won a silver medal in women's 25m pistol team.

In 2022, she won the gold medal in air pistol at the USA Shooting National Junior Olympic Championships.

=== 2023–present ===
In 2023, Korkhin earned an individual bronze medal in Women's 25m Pistol at the ISSF Junior World Cup. In July 2023 at the 2023 ISSF Junior World Championships in Changwon, South Korea, she won an individual bronze medal in 25m Pistol.

Korkhin won a gold medal at the 2024 Championship of the Americas (CAT) Games in Buenos Aires, Argentina, in Women's 25m Sport Pistol Team, along with teammates Katelyn Abeln and Lisa Emmert-Traciak. She also won the 2024 United States national championship in women's air pistol. In March 2024, she was ranked #3 in the United States in 25m sport pistol, and won the individual air pistol at the Intercollegiate Pistol Championship.

She now shoots for the Ohio State Buckeyes pistol team. Her coach with the team is former four-time Olympian Libby Callahan. Korkhin practices shooting five times a week.

=== 2024 Paris Olympics ===
Korkhin represented the United States at the 2024 Paris Olympics in Women's 25m Sport Pistol at 19 years old, on August 2, 2024. After Paris, she will begin her sophomore year of college at Ohio State University.

== See also ==
- List of select Jewish shooters
