= ISSF Junior World Championships =

International Shooting Sport Federation junior competition

The ISSF Junior World Championship was introduced by the International Shooting Sport Federation in 2017. It covers a variety of both Olympic and non-Olympic events in rifle, pistol and shotgun, with individual and team events.

The ISSF defines a 'junior' as an athlete under the age of 21 on December 31 of the competition year.

== Championships ==
Number	Year	Place	Top-ranked nation
1	2017	Moscow (RUS)	China
2	2021	Lima (PER)	India
3	2023	Changwon (KOR)	China
4	2024	Lima (PER)	India
5	2026	Suhl (GER)	India

== Events ==
The following events are currently featured in the ISSF Junior World Championships:

Rifle

- 10 meter air rifle (I, T, X)
- 50 meter rifle prone (I)
- 50 meter rifle three positions (I, T, X)

Pistol

- 10 meter air pistol (I, T, X)
- 25 meter pistol (I, T)
- 25 meter rapid fire pistol (I, T, X)

Shotgun

- Trap (I, T, X)
- Skeet (I, T, X)

I = individual; T = team; X = mixed team

The following events were also contested in previous editions:

Rifle

- 50 meter rifle prone (T)

Pistol

- 25 meter standard pistol (I, T)
- 50 meter pistol (I, T)

Shotgun

- Double trap (I, T)

I = individual; T = team; X = mixed team

== All Time Medal table ==
Rank	Nation	Gold	Silver	Bronze	Total
1	India (IND)	47	36	35	118
2	China (CHN)	25	15	17	57
3	Italy (ITA)	21	16	17	54
4	United States (USA)	17	17	26	60
5	Ukraine (UKR)	11	8	10	29
6	France (FRA)	7	12	7	26
7	Germany (GER)	7	9	13	29
8	Norway (NOR)	7	9	11	27
9	Hungary (HUN)	7	1	3	11
10	South Korea (KOR)	6	9	13	28
11	Individual Neutral Athletes (AIN)	6	5	3	14
12	Kazakhstan (KAZ)	6	2	0	8
13	Poland (POL)	5	3	0	8
14	Great Britain (GBR)	4	8	0	12
15	Switzerland (SUI)	4	0	2	6
16	Czech Republic (CZE)	3	3	6	12
17	Spain (ESP)	3	2	0	5
18	Russia (RUS)	2	4	2	8
19	Slovenia (SLO)	2	0	0	2
20	Finland (FIN)	1	4	5	10
21	Romania (ROU)	1	3	2	6
22	Belarus (BLR)	1	2	0	3
23	Austria (AUT)	1	1	3	5
24	Croatia (CRO)	1	1	2	4
25	Azerbaijan (AZE)	1	1	1	3
25	Cyprus (CYP)	1	1	1	3
25	Greece (GRE)	1	1	1	3
28	Australia (AUS)	1	0	1	2
28	Chinese Taipei (TPE)	1	0	1	2
30	Denmark (DEN)	1	0	0	1
30	Japan (JPN)	1	0	0	1
32	Sweden (SWE)	0	3	1	4
33	Uzbekistan (UZB)	0	2	1	3
34	Bulgaria (BUL)	0	2	0	2
34	North Korea (PRK)	0	2	0	2
36	Turkey (TUR)	0	1	1	2
37	Singapore (SGP)	0	1	0	1
38	Brazil (BRA)	0	0	1	1
38	Mongolia (MGL)	0	0	1	1
38	Slovakia (SVK)	0	0	1	1
38	Thailand (THA)	0	0	1	1
Totals (41 entries)		202	184	189	575
