= Shooting at the 2023 European Games =

- Location: Wrocław
- Dates: 22 June – 2 July
- Competitors: 388 from 45 nations

Shooting events at the 2023 European Games were held at the Wrocław Shooting Centre from 22 June to 2 July 2023. Thirty events were programmed, twelve individual (as in the program of the Paris Olympics), twelve by teams and six by mixed teams.

== Calendar ==
OC	Opening ceremony	●	Event competitions	1	Event finals	CC	Closing ceremony

June/July	21st Wed	22nd Thu	23rd Fri	24th Sat	25th Sun	26th Mon	27th Tue	28th Wed	29th Thu	30th Fri	1st Sat	2nd Sun	Total events
Ceremonies	OC											CC	
Shooting		3	3	4	3	3	3	2	2	3	2	2	30

== Qualification ==
The highest ranked athlete in each individual event at the 2023 European Games will obtain a non-nominative quota for their NOC for the Paris 2024 Olympic Games .

NOCs may enter a maximum of two athletes in each of the individual events, and a maximum of two mixed teams in each of the mixed team events composed of the same athletes who have qualified and are eligible to compete in the individual events and a maximum of one team in each of the team events.

Individual quotas are distributed via:

- 144 quotas (i.e. 12 per event) are distributed based on the respective results at the last European championships:
  - 2022 European Shotgun Championships (Larnaca, Sept. 2022),
  - 2022 European 25/50 m Events Championships (Wrocław, Sep 2022),
  - 2023 European 10 m Events Championships (Tallinn, Mar 2023)
- 180 quotas (i.e. 15 per event) are distributed from the European ranking based on the world ranking of April 20 which includes the world championships, the grand prix and the world cups
- 12 quotas are reserved for the host country
- 18 are invitations.

Nation	Men						Women						Men's team						Women's team						Mixed team						Total athletes
Nation	AR M	R3P M	AP M	RFP	TR M	SK M	AR W	R3P W	AP W	SP W	TR W	SK W	AR TM	R3P TM	AP TM	RFP TM	TR TM	SK TM	AR TW	R3P TW	AP TW	SP TW	TR TW	SK TW	AR MT	R3P MT	AP MT	RFP MT	TR MT	SK MT	Total athletes
Albania										1																					1
Armenia			1						1			1															1				3
Austria	2	2	2	2			1	2	1	1			1	1					1	1					2	2	1				9
Azerbaijan			1	1					2	1	2	2									1		1	1			1	1			10
Belgium							1	1																							1
Bosnia and Herzegovina	1						1																		1						2
Bulgaria	1	1	1	1					2	2	1																1				6
Croatia	2	2			2		1	1	1				1	1			1								~~1~~	1					9
Cyprus					1	2					1	2						~~1~~					1	~~1~~					1	2	10
Czech Republic	2	2	2	2	2	2	2	2	2	2	1	2	1	1	1	1	1	1	1	1	1	1		1	2	2	2	1	1	2	24
Denmark	1	1	1			2	2	2											1	1					1	1					8
Estonia	1	1		2	1	1		1		1						1															8
Finland	1	1			2	2	1				2	1					1	1					1		1				2	1	12
France	2	2	1	2	1	1	2	2	2	2	2	2		1		1			1		1	1			2		1		1	1	20
Georgia			2			1			2	1					1						1						2				7
Germany	2	2	2	2	1	2	2	2	2	2	2	2	1	1	1			1	1	1	1	1	1		2	2	2		1	2	23
Great Britain		1	2	2	2	2	1	2	1	1	2	2													1	1	1	1	2	2	15
Greece			1		1	2			2	1		1						1									1			1	8
Hungary	2	2	1	1			2	2	1	2	1	1	1	1					1	1	1	1			2	2	2				14
Iceland						1																									1
Ireland						1					1																				2
Israel	1						2	1																	1						3
Italy	2	1	2	2	2	2	1	2	2	2	2	2	1		1	1	1	1		1	1	1	1	1	2	2	2		2	2	27
Kosovo			1																												1
Latvia			2			1			1	1		1			1												1			1	6
Lithuania	1	1								1																					2
Luxembourg					1						1																		1		2
Malta					1	2			1	1	1							1											1		6
Moldova									1																						1
Montenegro									2																						2
Netherlands						1						1																		1	2
North Macedonia	1						1																		1						2
Norway	2	2	1	1		1	2	2		1			1	1					1	1					2	2	1	1			11
Poland	2	2	2	2	2	1	2	2	2	2	1	1	1	1		1	1		1	1	1	1			2	2	2	1	1	1	19
Portugal			1		2				1	1	1						1										1		1		6
Romania							2	1	1																						3
San Marino					1						1																		1		2
Serbia	2	2	2				2	2	1				1	1	1				1	1					2	2	1				10
Slovakia	2	2	1		2		2	2		1	2	2		1			1							1	2	2			1		15
Slovenia		1		1	1		2	2		2	1								1	1		1				1		1	1		11
Spain	1		1	1	2		1		2	2	2										1				1		1		2		12
Sweden	1	1	1		1	2	1		2	1		1													1		1			~~1~~	9
Switzerland	2	2	1				2	2											1	1					2	2					7
Turkey	2		2	2	2				1	1	2	2	1		1		1						1	1			1	1	2		17
Ukraine	2	2	2	2		1	1	2	2	2	1	2	1	1	1	1			1	1		1			2	2	2	2		1	19
Total: 45 NOCs	38	33	36	26	30	30	37	35	38	35	30	28	11	11	8	6	8	6	12	12	9	8	6	5	32	26	28	9	21	17	388

== Medal summary ==
=== Men's events ===
Event	Gold	Silver	Bronze
10 meter air pistol	İsmail Keleş; Turkey	Robin Walter; Germany	Paolo Monna; Italy
10 meter air rifle	Danilo Sollazzo; Italy	Maximilian Ulbrich; Germany	Jiří Přívratský; Czech Republic
25 meter rapid fire pistol	Clément Bessaguet; France	Christian Reitz; Germany	Martin Podhráský; Czech Republic
50 meter rifle three positions	Zalán Pekler; Hungary	Jiří Přívratský; Czech Republic	Alexander Schmirl; Austria
Skeet	Marcus Svensson; Sweden	Dainis Upelnieks; Latvia	Eetu Kallioinen; Finland
Trap	Mauro De Filippis; Italy	Vladimír Štěpán; Czech Republic	Rickard Levin Andersson; Sweden
Team 10 meter air pistol	Germany; Christian Reitz; Michael Schwald; Robin Walter	Turkey; Yusuf Dikeç; İsmail Keleş; Buğra Selimzade	Italy; Federico Nilo Maldini; Paolo Monna; Massimo Spinella
Team 10 meter air rifle	Hungary; Soma Hammerl; Zalán Pekler; István Péni	Croatia; Petar Gorsa; Miran Maričić; Josip Sikavica	Austria; Alexander Schmirl; Martin Strempfl; Andreas Thum
Team 25 meter rapid fire pistol	France; Clément Bessaguet; Yan Chesnel; Jean Quiquampoix	Czech Republic; Martin Podhráský; Matěj Rampula; Martin Strnad	Italy; Riccardo Mazzetti; Andrea Morassut; Massimo Spinella
Team 50 meter rifle three positions	Hungary; Soma Hammerl; Zalán Pekler; István Péni	Czech Republic; Petr Nymburský; Jiří Přívratský; František Smetana	Serbia; Lazar Kovačević; Milenko Sebić; Milutin Stefanović
Team skeet	Finland; Eetu Kallioinen; Tommi Takanen; Timi Vallioniemi	Italy; Tammaro Cassandro; Gabriele Rossetti; Elia Sdruccioli	Greece; Charalampos Chalkiadakis; Nikolaos Mavrommatis; Efthimios Mitas
Team trap	Croatia; Giovanni Cernogoraz; Anton Glasnović; Francesco Ravalico	Slovakia; Adrián Drobný; Marián Kovačócy; Erik Varga	Portugal; João Azevedo; José Manuel Bruno Faria; Armelim Rodrigues

=== Women's events ===
Event	Gold	Silver	Bronze
10 meter air pistol	Klaudia Breś; Poland	Camille Jedrzejewski; France	Olena Kostevych; Ukraine
10 meter air rifle	Nina Christen; Switzerland	Kamila Novotná; Slovakia	Océanne Muller; France
25 meter pistol	Anna Korakaki; Greece	Antoaneta Kostadinova; Bulgaria	Doreen Vennekamp; Germany
50 meter rifle three positions	Jenny Stene; Norway	Natalia Kochańska; Poland	Seonaid McIntosh; Great Britain
Skeet	Martina Bartolomei; Italy	Emmanouela Katzouraki; Greece	Nadine Messerschmidt; Germany
Trap	Jessica Rossi; Italy	Satu Mäkelä-Nummela; Finland	Jana Špotáková; Slovakia
Team 10 meter air pistol	Germany; Josefin Eder; Sandra Reitz; Doreen Vennekamp	France; Celine Goberville; Camille Jedrzejewski; Mathilde Lamolle	Italy; Sara Costantino; Chiara Giancamilli; Maria Varricchio
Team 10 meter air rifle	Switzerland; Nina Christen; Audrey Gogniat; Chiara Leone	Norway; Jeanette Hegg Duestad; Milda Marina Haugen; Jenny Stene	Poland; Natalia Kochańska; Julia Piotrowska; Aneta Stankiewicz
Team 25 meter pistol	Ukraine; Yuliya Korostylova; Olena Kostevych; Anastasiia Nimets	Poland; Julita Borek; Klaudia Breś; Joanna Wawrzonowska	Germany; Sandra Reitz; Michelle Skeries; Doreen Vennekamp
Team 50 meter rifle three positions	Norway; Jeanette Hegg Duestad; Mari Bardseng Lovseth; Jenny Stene	Switzerland; Nina Christen; Sarina Hitz; Chiara Leone	Germany; Jolyn Beer; Anna Janssen; Lisa Müller
Team skeet	Italy; Martina Bartolomei; Chiara Di Marziantonio; Simona Scocchetti	Slovakia; Danka Barteková; Vanesa Hocková; Monika Štibravá	Czech Republic; Anna Šindelářová; Martina Skalická; Barbora Šumová
Team trap	Italy; Giulia Grassia; Jessica Rossi; Silvana Stanco	Turkey; Rümeysa Pelin Kaya; Dilara Bedia Kızılsu; Safiye Temizdemir	Germany; Sarah Bindrich; Kathrin Murche; Bettina Valdorf

=== Mixed events ===
Event	Gold	Silver	Bronze
Team 10 meter air pistol	Italy; Paolo Monna; Sara Costantino	Armenia; Benik Khlghatyan; Elmira Karapetyan	Bulgaria; Samuil Donkov; Antoaneta Kostadinova
Team 10 meter air rifle	Hungary; Zalán Pekler; Eszter Mészáros	Spain; Jesús Oviedo; Paula Grande	Italy; Danilo Sollazzo; Sofia Ceccarello
Team 25 meter rapid fire pistol	Ukraine; Pavlo Korostylov; Yuliya Korostylova	Czech Republic; Matěj Rampula; Alžběta Dědová	Norway; Ole-Harald Aas; Ann Helen Aune
Team 50 meter rifle three positions	Switzerland; Jan Lochbihler; Nina Christen	Austria; Andreas Thum; Sheileen Waibel	Norway; Simon Claussen; Jenny Stene
Team skeet	Italy; Gabriele Rossetti; Simona Scocchetti	Cyprus; Andreas Chasikos; Anastasia Eleftheriou	Great Britain; Ben Llewellin; Amber Rutter
Team trap	Italy; Giovanni Pellielo; Jessica Rossi	Great Britain; Matthew Coward-Holley; Lucy Charlotte Hall	Italy; Mauro De Filippis; Giulia Grassia

== Medal table ==
* Host nation (Poland)

Rank	NOC	Gold	Silver	Bronze	Total
1	Italy	9	1	6	16
2	Hungary	4	0	0	4
3	Switzerland	3	1	0	4
4	Germany	2	3	5	10
5	France	2	2	1	5
6	Norway	2	1	2	5
7	Ukraine	2	0	1	3
8	Poland*	1	2	1	4
9	Turkey	1	2	0	3
10	Finland	1	1	1	3
10	Greece	1	1	1	3
12	Croatia	1	1	0	2
13	Sweden	1	0	1	2
14	Czech Republic	0	5	3	8
15	Slovakia	0	3	1	4
16	Austria	0	1	2	3
16	Great Britain	0	1	2	3
18	Bulgaria	0	1	1	2
19	Armenia	0	1	0	1
19	Cyprus	0	1	0	1
19	Latvia	0	1	0	1
19	Spain	0	1	0	1
23	Portugal	0	0	1	1
23	Serbia	0	0	1	1
Totals (24 entries)		30	30	30	90
