= Shooting at the 2024 Summer Olympics – Men's 25 metre rapid fire pistol =

Men's 25 metre rapid fire pistol at the Games of the XXXIII Olympiad
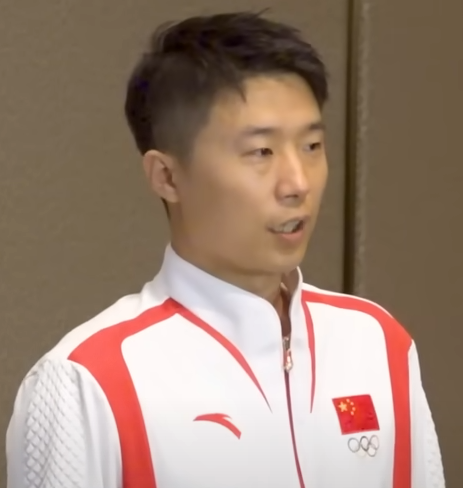
- Li Yuehong
- Venue: National Shooting Centre, Châteauroux
- Dates: 4 - 5 August 2024
- Competitors: 29 from 19 nations

Medalists
1st place, gold medalist(s)		Li Yuehong	China
2nd place, silver medalist(s)		Cho Yeong-jae	South Korea
3rd place, bronze medalist(s)		Wang Xinjie	China

The men's ISSF 25 meter rapid fire pistol event at the 2024 Summer Olympics took place on 4 and 5 August 2024 at the Chateauroux Shooting Centre. 29 shooters from 20 nations are expected to compete in the rapid fire pistol, with the precise number depending on how many shooters compete in multiple events.

== Qualification ==
Each National Olympic Committee (NOC) can enter up to two shooters if the NOC earns enough quota sports or has enough double starter-qualified shooters. To compete, a shooter needs a quota spot and to achieve a Minimum Qualification Score (MQS). Once a shooter is using a quota spot in any shooting event, they can enter any other shooting event for which they have achieved the MQS as well (a double starter qualification). There are 29 quota spots available for the rapid fire pistol.

== Competition format ==
The competition format will continue to use the two-round (qualifying round and final) format, as in 1988 and since 1996, with the final format introduced in 2012. The 2005 rules changes required the pistols used to be sport pistols, banning .22 Short cartridges.

The qualifying round from 1988 onward was essentially the same as the full competition format from 1948 to 1984. Each shooter fired 60 shots. These were done in two courses of 30; each course consisted of two stages of 15; each stage consisted of three series of 5. In each stage, the time limit for each series was 8 seconds for the first, 6 seconds for the second, and 4 seconds for the third.

The 1988 tournament had added a two-series final for the top eight shooters; the 1992 competition broke that down to a four-series semifinal for the top eight and two-series final for the top four. In 1996 and 2000, the top eight once again advanced to the final. The 2004 version had reduced the number of finalists to six, where it stayed in 2008 and 2012.

Prior to 2008, the final involved two series of 5 shots at 4 seconds. In 2008, that was expanded to four series. The 2012 competition used an entirely different format, however, which remained in effect in 2016 and 2020. The competition switched to a "hit-or-miss" system, where a 9.7 or better scores as a "hit" for 1 point and anything lower scores as a "miss" for 0 points. The final featured 8 series of 5 shots each (5 points maximum per series, 40 points maximum total). However, starting with the fourth series, the remaining shooter with the lowest total was eliminated after each series (5 shooters remaining in the fifth series, 4 in the sixth, 3 in the seventh, and only 2 in the eighth and final series).

The 1992 competition had introduced round targets rather than the silhouettes used from 1948 to 1988 as well as many pre-World War II versions of the event. Score, rather than hits, had been used as the primary ranking method since 1960.

== Records ==
Prior to this competition, the existing world and Olympic records were as follows.

Qualifying records
World record	Christian Reitz (GER); Kim Jun-hong (KOR)	593	Osijek, Croatia; Beijing, China	30 July 2013; 6 July 2014
Olympic record	Alexei Klimov (RUS)	592	London, United Kingdom	3 August 2012

Final records
World record	Li Yuehong (CHN)	39	Baku, Azerbaijan	21 August 2023
Olympic record	Leuris Pupo (CUB)	34	London, United Kingdom	3 August 2012

== Schedule ==
The competition is held over two days, Sunday, 4 August and Monday, 5 August. The first half of the qualifying round is the first day; the second half of the qualifying round as well as the final is on the second day.

All times are Central European Standard Time (UTC+2)

Date	Time	Round
Sunday, 4 August 2024	9:00	Stage 1 Stage 2
Monday, 5 August 2024	9:00	Final

== Results ==
=== Qualifying ===
Rank	Shooter	Nation	Stage 1				Stage 2				Total	Notes
Rank	Shooter	Nation	8s	6s	4s	Total	8s	6s	4s	Total	Total	Notes
1	Li Yuehong	China	97	99	98	294	98	98	98	294	588-30x	Q
2	Wang Xinjie	China	99	98	96	293	99	98	97	294	587-24x	Q
3	Pavlo Korostylov	Ukraine	98	100	95	293	100	98	96	294	587-17x	Q
4	Cho Yeong-jae	South Korea	100	100	97	297	99	97	93	289	586-22x	Q
5	Massimo Spinella	Italy	100	97	97	294	99	97	96	292	586-19x	Q
6	Florian Peter	Germany	99	98	95	292	100	99	94	293	585-27x	Q
7	Clément Bessaguet	France	100	97	96	293	98	100	94	292	585-17x	
8	Maksym Horodynets	Ukraine	99	96	94	289	99	99	97	295	584-14x	
9	Vijayveer Sidhu	India	98	98	97	293	100	98	92	290	583-26x	
10	Nikita Chiryukin	Kazakhstan	98	99	96	293	97	100	93	290	583-20x	
11	Peeter Olesk	Estonia	98	98	93	289	97	100	97	294	583-17x	
12	Riccardo Mazzetti	Italy	95	97	97	289	100	98	96	294	583-14x	
13	Anish Anish	India	98	98	97	293	99	97	93	289	582-22x	
14	Matěj Rampula	Czech Republic	99	96	93	288	97	97	99	293	581-22x	
15	Ghulam Mustafa Bashir	Pakistan	98	99	95	292	97	97	95	289	581-19x	
16	Leuris Pupo	Cuba	98	97	90	285	100	98	98	296	581-13x	
17	Song Jong-ho	South Korea	98	98	96	292	99	98	91	288	580-26x	
18	Ruslan Lunev	Azerbaijan	98	98	93	289	98	100	93	291	580-22x	
19	Keith Sanderson	United States	98	98	93	289	99	97	94	290	579-16x	
20	Enkhtaivany Davaakhüü	Mongolia	97	98	93	288	99	95	96	290	578-20x	
21	Jorge Álvarez	Cuba	96	96	98	290	100	94	94	288	578-18x	
22	Jean Quiquampoix	France	98	96	96	290	100	94	94	288	578-16x	
23	Christian Reitz	Germany	99	98	94	291	98	98	90	286	577-15x	
24	Omar Mohamed	Egypt	97	97	94	288	98	97	93	288	576-18x	
25	Henry Turner Leverett	United States	96	97	93	286	98	93	96	287	573-16x	
26	Sergei Evglevski	Australia	96	95	92	283	99	97	94	290	573-14x	
27	Martin Podhráský	Czech Republic	95	99	92	286	100	96	91	287	573-11x	
28	Dai Yoshioka	Japan	98	93	93	284	98	96	94	288	572-12x	
29	Douglas Gómez	Venezuela	95	94	95	284	96	99	90	285	569-12x	

=== Final ===
Rank	Athlete	Nation	Series								Notes
Rank	Athlete	Nation	1	2	3	4	5	6	7	8	Notes
1st place, gold medalist(s)	Li Yuehong	China	5	8	12	14	18	23	27	32	
2nd place, silver medalist(s)	Cho Yeong-jae	South Korea	3	6	11	15	19	21	24	25	
3rd place, bronze medalist(s)	Wang Xinjie	China	5	8	11	13	17	20	23	—N/a	
4	Florian Peter	Germany	2	7	11	14	18	20*	—N/a		SO
5	Pavlo Korostylov	Ukraine	4	6	10	14	16	—N/a			
6	Massimo Spinella	Italy	1	4	9	10	—N/a				
