= Shooting at the 2023 European Games – Men's 25 metre rapid fire pistol =

Men's 25 metre rapid fire pistol at the 2023 European Games
- Venue: Wrocław Shooting Centre
- Dates: 29–30 June
- Competitors: 26 from 16 nations

Medalists
gold medal	Clément Bessaguet	France
silver medal	Christian Reitz	Germany
bronze medal	Martin Podhráský	Czech Republic

The men's 25 metre rapid fire pistol event at the 2023 European Games took place on 29 and 30 June at the Wrocław Shooting Centre.

== Records ==
Prior to this competition, the existing world, European and Games records were as follows.

Qualification
World Record	Christian Reitz (GER)	593	Osijek, Croatia	30 July 2013
European Record	Christian Reitz (GER)	593	Osijek, Croatia	30 July 2013
Games Record	Oliver Geis (GER)	588	Baku, Azerbaijan	21 June 2015
Final
World Record	Kim Jun-hong (KOR)	38	Changwon, South Korea	25 April 2018
European Record				
Games Record	Christian Reitz (GER)	33	Baku, Azerbaijan	21 June 2015

== Results ==
=== Qualification ===
Rank	Athlete	Country	Part 1				Part 2				Total	Notes
Rank	Athlete	Country	8s	6s	4s	ST1	8s	6s	4s	ST2	Total	Notes
1	Christian Reitz	Germany	99	99	95	293	99	99	98	296	589-20x	Q, GR
2	Matěj Rampula	Czech Republic	99	99	92	290	98	100	98	296	586-18x	Q
3	Riccardo Mazzetti	Italy	96	99	97	292	99	99	95	293	585-18x	Q
4	Clément Bessaguet	France	97	95	97	289	99	96	99	294	583-12x	Q
5	Florian Peter	Germany	99	100	99	298	97	94	93	284	582-23x	Q
6	Ruslan Lunev	Azerbaijan	99	93	100	292	98	98	93	289	581-20x	Q
7	Jean Quiquampoix	France	100	96	97	293	97	98	93	288	581-19x	Q
8	Martin Podhráský	Czech Republic	98	97	96	291	97	96	96	289	580-15x	Q
9	Pavlo Korostylov	Ukraine	99	97	94	290	96	97	97	290	580-13x	
10	Massimo Spinella	Italy	99	98	97	294	99	94	92	285	579-20x	
11	Maksym Horodynets	Ukraine	97	97	96	290	97	99	93	289	579-17x	
12	Peeter Olesk	Estonia	95	96	94	285	97	98	95	290	575-16x	
13	Daniel Kral	Austria	99	97	92	288	97	96	94	287	575-15x	
14	Jože Čeper	Slovenia	95	99	90	284	95	99	94	288	572-17x	
15	Stoyan Pushkov	Bulgaria	97	94	92	283	97	98	94	289	572-16x	
16	Sam Gowin	Great Britain	99	97	93	289	93	96	94	283	572-13x	
17	Oskar Miliwek	Poland	99	100	95	294	97	94	86	277	571-16x	
18	Damian Klimek	Poland	99	94	92	285	97	92	97	286	571-11x	
19	Özgür Varlık	Turkey	98	98	90	286	100	94	90	284	570-14x	
20	Ole-Harald Aas	Norway	97	97	90	284	96	98	90	284	568-12x	
21	Richard Zechmeister	Austria	95	95	93	283	94	95	93	282	565-14x	
22	Csaba Bartók	Hungary	95	95	92	282	93	94	95	282	564-13x	
23	Nemo Tabur	Estonia	96	96	88	280	98	97	87	282	562-14x	
24	Kristian Callaghan	Great Britain	96	97	88	281	96	91	90	277	558-10x	
25	Jorge Llames	Spain	97	95	94	286	99	94	77	270	556-13x	
26	Yusuf Dikeç	Turkey	96	94	83	273	98	97	88	283	556-9x	

=== Ranking matches ===
Rank	Athlete	Series				Total	Notes
Rank	Athlete	1	2	3	4	Total	Notes
1	Florian Peter (GER)	4	4	3	4	15	Q
1	Christian Reitz (GER)	5	3	3	4	15	Q
3	Jean Quiquampoix (FRA)	4	3	2	5	14	
4	Riccardo Mazzetti (ITA)	4	4	3	2	13	

Rank	Athlete	Series				Total	Notes
Rank	Athlete	1	2	3	4	Total	Notes
1	Clément Bessaguet (FRA)	4	3	5	5	17	Q
2	Martin Podhráský (CZE)	2	5	3	3	13	Q
3	Matěj Rampula (CZE)	2	3	4	1	10	
4	Ruslan Lunev (AZE)	1	2	2	4	9	

=== Medal match ===
Rank	Athlete	Series								Total
Rank	Athlete	1	2	3	4	5	6	7	8	Total
1st place, gold medalist(s)	Clément Bessaguet (FRA)	4	4	4	4	5	3	3	3	30
1st place, gold medalist(s)	Clément Bessaguet (FRA)	4	8	12	16	21	24	27	30	30
2nd place, silver medalist(s)	Christian Reitz (GER)	3	4	4	5	4	3	3	2	28
2nd place, silver medalist(s)	Christian Reitz (GER)	3	7	11	16	20	23	26	28	28
3rd place, bronze medalist(s)	Martin Podhráský (CZE)	2	2	4	5	1	4			18
3rd place, bronze medalist(s)	Martin Podhráský (CZE)	2	4	8	13	14	18			18
4	Florian Peter (GER)	3	4	2	3					12
4	Florian Peter (GER)	3	7	9	12					12
