= Shooting at the 2019 European Games – Men's 25 metre rapid fire pistol =

Men's 25 metre rapid fire pistol at the 2019 European Games
- Venue: Shooting Centre
- Dates: 25–26 June
- Competitors: 22 from 13 nations
- Winning score: 33

Medalists
gold medal	Oliver Geis	Germany
silver medal	Jean Quiquampoix	France
bronze medal	Clément Bessaguet	France

The men's 25 metre rapid fire pistol event at the 2019 European Games in Minsk, Belarus took place on 25 and 26 June at the Shooting Centre.

== Schedule ==
All times are local (UTC+3).

Date	Time	Event
Tuesday, 25 June 2019	14:30	Qualification
Wednesday, 26 June 2019	12:30	Qualification
Wednesday, 26 June 2019	16:50	Final

== Records ==
Prior to this competition, the existing world, European and Games records were as follows.

Qualification
World Record	Christian Reitz (GER)	593	Osijek, Croatia	30 July 2013
European Record	Christian Reitz (GER)	593	Osijek, Croatia	30 July 2013
Games Record	Oliver Geis (GER)	588	Baku, Azerbaijan	21 June 2015
Final
World Record	Kim Jun-hong (KOR)	38	Changwon, South Korea	25 April 2018
European Record	Riccardo Mazzetti (ITA)	35	Beijing, China	6 July 2014
Games Record	Christian Reitz (GER)	33	Baku, Azerbaijan	21 June 2015

== Results ==
=== Qualification ===
Rank	Athlete	Country	8s	6s	4s	ST1	8s	6s	4s	ST2	Total	Notes
1	Christian Reitz	Germany	99	99	97	295	98	97	98	293	588-21x	Q, =GR
2	Clément Bessaguet	France	98	97	96	291	99	98	95	292	583-24x	Q
3	Oliver Geis	Germany	98	95	97	290	100	97	94	291	581-26x	Q
4	Jean Quiquampoix	France	99	98	93	290	98	98	95	291	581-19x	Q
5	Özgür Varlık	Turkey	98	97	94	289	97	98	96	291	580-13x	Q
6	Alexander Alifirenko	Russia	95	97	94	286	98	97	98	293	579-22x	Q
7	Martin Strnad	Czech Republic	99	99	96	294	99	94	91	284	578-13x	
8	Murat Kılıç	Turkey	97	97	94	288	96	99	94	289	577-13x	
9	Martin Podhráský	Czech Republic	96	96	96	288	98	95	93	286	574-18x	
10	Oskar Miliwek	Poland	98	97	93	288	98	94	93	285	573-17x	
11	Peeter Olesk	Estonia	98	99	93	290	98	96	89	283	573-17x	
12	Kristian Callaghan	Great Britain	98	96	93	287	100	95	91	286	573-16x	
13	Ruslan Lunev	Azerbaijan	98	94	92	284	100	96	93	289	573-13x	
14	Nikita Sukhanov	Russia	98	93	93	284	96	96	96	288	572-14x	
15	Stoyan Pushkov	Bulgaria	96	97	92	285	95	97	94	286	571-15x	
16	Riccardo Mazzetti	Italy	100	96	94	290	97	93	91	281	571-12x	
17	Pavlo Korostylov	Ukraine	99	96	92	287	98	97	88	283	570-18x	
18	Sam Gowin	Great Britain	95	97	89	281	97	97	94	288	569-13x	
19	Tommaso Chelli	Italy	97	96	95	288	95	94	92	281	569-8x	
20	Piotr Daniluk	Poland	99	98	83	280	97	95	95	287	567-12x	
21	Oleksandr Petriv	Ukraine	100	96	93	289	96	89	92	277	566-12x	
22	Thomas Havlicek	Austria	88	97	93	278	96	95	94	285	563-12x	
	Tibor Takács	Hungary									DNS	

=== Final ===
Rank	Athlete	1	2	3	4	Int	5	Int	6	Int	7	Int	8	Total	Notes
1st place, gold medalist(s)	Oliver Geis (GER)	4	3	4	5	16	5	21	4	25	5	30	3	33	=GR
2nd place, silver medalist(s)	Jean Quiquampoix (FRA)	4	5	4	3	16	5	21	5	26	2	28	4	32	
3rd place, bronze medalist(s)	Clément Bessaguet (FRA)	5	4	4	3	16	3	19	4	23	3	26		26	
4	Alexander Alifirenko (RUS)	4	3	2	4	13	4	17	4	21				21	
5	Christian Reitz (GER)	3	3	4	3	13	1	14						14	
6	Özgür Varlık (TUR)	4	4	2	1	11								11	
