= Shooting at the 2024 Summer Olympics – Men's 10 metre air pistol =

Men's 10 metre air pistol at the Games of the XXXIII Olympiad
- Venue: National Shooting Center, Châteauroux
- Dates: 27–28 July
- Competitors: 33 from 26 nations

Medalists
1st place, gold medalist(s)		Xie Yu	China
2nd place, silver medalist(s)		Federico Nilo Maldini	Italy
3rd place, bronze medalist(s)		Paolo Monna	Italy

The Men's 10 meter air pistol event at the 2024 Summer Olympics took place on 27–28 July 2024 at the National Shooting Center, Châteauroux in France.

== Records ==
Prior to this competition, the existing world and Olympic records were as follows:

Qualification records
World record	Jin Jong-oh (KOR)	594	Changwon, South Korea	11 April 2009
Olympic record	Mikhail Nestruyev (RUS)	591	Athens, Greece	14 August 2004

Final records
World record	Kim Song-guk (PRK)	246.5	Doha, Qatar	11 November 2019
Olympic record	Javad Foroughi (IRN)	244.8	Tokyo, Japan	24 July 2021

== Schedule ==
All times are Central European Summer Time (UTC+2)

Date	Time	Round
Saturday, 27 July 2024	10:30	Qualification
Sunday, 28 July 2024	09:30	Final

== Results ==
=== Qualification ===
Rank	Shooter	Nation	1	2	3	4	5	6	Total	Inner 10s	Notes
1	Damir Mikec	Serbia	99	97	96	98	97	97	584	17	Q
2	Federico Nilo Maldini	Italy	96	97	95	98	99	96	581	16	Q
3	Christian Reitz	Germany	95	97	96	97	100	95	580	22	Q
4	Lee Won-ho	South Korea	98	98	95	95	95	99	580	19	Q
5	Paolo Monna	Italy	95	97	97	97	98	95	579	18	Q
6	Xie Yu	China	98	96	94	96	97	98	579	16	Q
7	Enkhtaivany Davaakhüü	Mongolia	96	96	96	96	96	98	578	21	Q
8	Robin Walter	Germany	96	98	93	97	97	96	577	17	Q
9	Sarabjot Singh	India	94	97	96	100	93	97	577	16	
10	İsmail Keleş	Turkey	96	97	95	96	97	96	577	15	
11	Viktor Bankin	Ukraine	97	96	93	96	96	98	576	20	
12	Pavlo Korostylov	Ukraine	97	98	98	93	95	95	576	20	
13	Yusuf Dikeç	Turkey	97	96	100	95	94	94	576	18	
14	Cho Yeong-jae	South Korea	96	98	96	95	98	92	575	21	
15	Nikita Chiryukin	Kazakhstan	93	98	94	96	99	95	575	19	
16	Kiril Kirov	Bulgaria	96	96	96	95	95	97	575	16	
17	Michele Esercitato	Canada	99	96	95	96	95	94	575	13	
18	Arjun Singh Cheema	India	96	97	97	94	93	97	574	17	
19	Zhang Bowen	China	95	97	94	97	95	95	573	21	
20	Jason Solari	Switzerland	94	94	95	96	96	98	573	13	
21	Lauris Strautmanis	Latvia	96	93	96	95	96	96	572	18	
22	Gulfam Joseph	Pakistan	96	91	96	96	98	94	571	19	
23	Matěj Rampula	Czech Republic	96	92	95	96	97	95	571	16	
24	Ruslan Lunev	Azerbaijan	95	91	98	92	97	98	571	13	
25	Juraj Tužinský	Slovakia	94	97	94	92	97	97	571	13	
26	Johnathan Wong	Malaysia	96	95	97	95	93	94	570	15	
27	Diego Santiago Parra	Chile	94	94	92	97	94	97	568	16	
28	Florian Fouquet	France	93	93	94	93	96	94	566	18	
29	Samir Bouchireb	Algeria	99	91	93	94	91	95	563	11	
30	Francisco Centeno	Refugee Olympic Team	95	95	92	95	93	92	562	9	
31	Philipe Chateaubrian	Brazil	96	93	91	92	95	94	561	13	
32	Mohammed Bin Dallah	Libya	91	91	93	95	92	93	555	9	
33	Philip Elhage	Aruba	87	91	93	96	95	92	554	7	

=== Final ===
Rank	Shooter	Nation	1	2	3	4	5	6	7	8	9	Total	Notes
1st place, gold medalist(s)	Xie Yu	China	50.2	99.2	120.5	140.3	160.7	180.9	201.1	220.9	240.9	240.9	
2nd place, silver medalist(s)	Federico Nilo Maldini	Italy	50.1	100.1	120.4	140.7	161.6	181.7	200.6	220.2	240.0	240.0	
3rd place, bronze medalist(s)	Paolo Monna	Italy	51.6	101.4	120.6	141.3	160.1	181.2	199.8	218.6	—	218.6	
4	Lee Won-ho	South Korea	48.9	98.5	119.0	139.2	158.8	178.1	197.9	—		197.9	
5	Christian Reitz	Germany	48.5	98.6	118.6	139.1	159.0	177.6	—			177.6	
6	Robin Walter	Germany	48.4	98.6	118.6	137.9	158.4	—				158.4	
7	Damir Mikec	Serbia	49.0	97.1	117.7	136.9	—					136.9	
8	Enkhtaivany Davaakhüü	Mongolia	47.7	95.9	115.7	—						115.7	
