= Shooting at the 2016 Summer Olympics – Men's 25 metre rapid fire pistol =

Olympic shooting event

Men's 25 metre rapid fire pistol at the Games of the XXXI Olympiad
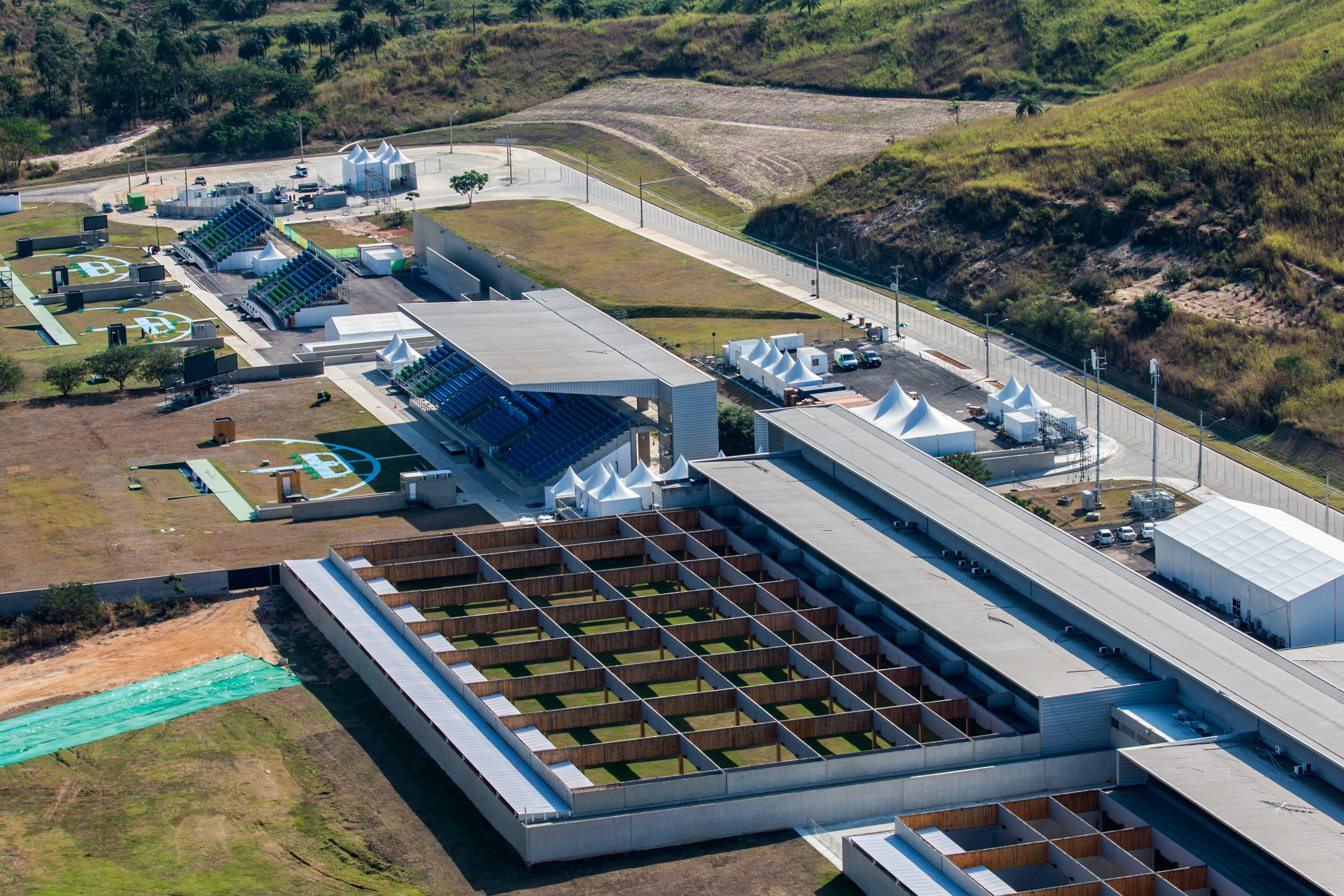
- Aerial view of the National Shooting Center in Deodoro, where the Men's 25m rapid fire pistol took place.
- Venue: National Shooting Center
- Dates: 12–13 August 2016
- Competitors: 26 from 20 nations
- Winning score: 34

Medalists
| 1st place, gold medalist(s) | | Christian Reitz; Germany |
| 2nd place, silver medalist(s) | | Jean Quiquampoix; France |
| 3rd place, bronze medalist(s) | | Li Yuehong; China |

The men's ISSF 25 meter rapid fire pistol event at the 2016 Olympic Games took place on 12 and 13 August 2016 at the National Shooting Center. There were 26 competitors from 20 nations. The event was won by Christian Reitz of Germany, the nation's first victory in the event and fifth overall (most of any nation). Reitz, the bronze medalist in 2008, was the 12th man to win multiple medals in the rapid fire pistol. Jean Quiquampoix of France took silver, the nation's first medal in the event since 1900. China took bronze, just as in 2012, this time by Li Yuehong.

The medals were presented by Austin Sealy, IOC member, Barbados and Franz Schreiber, Secretary General of the International Shooting Sport Federation.

== Background ==
This was the 25th appearance of what had been standardised in 1948 as the men's ISSF 25 meter rapid fire pistol event, the only event on the 2020 programme that traces back to 1896. The event has been held at every Summer Olympics except 1904 and 1928 (when no shooting events were held) and 1908; it was nominally open to women from 1968 to 1980, although very few women participated these years. The first five events were quite different, with some level of consistency finally beginning with the 1932 event—which, though it had differences from the 1924 competition, was roughly similar. The 1936 competition followed the 1932 one quite closely. The post-World War II event substantially altered the competition once again. The 1984 Games introduced women's-only shooting events, including the ISSF 25 meter pistol (though this is more similar to the non-Olympic men's ISSF 25 meter center-fire pistol than the rapid fire pistol).

Three of the six finalists from 2012 returned: gold medalist Leuris Pupo of Cuba, fourth-place finisher Alexei Klimov of Russia, and sixth place finisher (and 2008 bronze medalist) Christian Reitz of Germany. For the first time since 1984, Ralf Schumann was not competing. The 2014 world championship podium had been Korean shooter Kim Jun-hong, German shooter Oliver Geis, and Chinese shooter Li Yuehong. Kim and Reitz shared the world record for the qualifying round.

Azerbaijan and Estonia each made their debut in the event. The United States made its 21st appearance, most of any nation.

== Qualification ==
Each National Olympic Committee (NOC) could enter up to two shooters if the NOC earned enough quota sports or had enough crossover-qualified shooters. To compete, a shooter needed a quota spot and to achieve a Minimum Qualification Score (MQS). Once a shooter was using a quota spot in any shooting event, they could enter any other shooting event for which they had achieved the MQS as well (a crossover qualification). There were 18 quota spots available for the rapid fire pistol: 1 for the host nation (Brazil), 2 at the 2014 World Championship, 8 at the 2015 World Cup events (2 spots at each of 4 events), and 7 for continental events (2 each for Europe and Asia, 1 each for Americas, Africa, and Oceania). Four additional quota places were added through exchange from other events, a Tripartite Commission invitation, and re-allocation of unused quota. In 2016, four crossover qualifications (sharply increased from the one per year the last few Games) were used in the rapid fire pistol, 3 from the 10 metre air pistol and 1 from the 50 metre pistol.

== Competition format ==
The competition format continued to use the two-round (qualifying round and final) format, as in 1988 and since 1996, with the final format introduced in 2012. The 2005 rules changes required the pistols used to be sport pistols, banning .22 Short cartridges.

The qualifying round from 1988 onward was essentially the same as the full competition format from 1948–1984. Each shooter fired 60 shots. These were done in two courses of 30; each course consisted of two stages of 15; each stage consisted of three series of 5. In each stage, the time limit for each series was 8 seconds for the first, 6 seconds for the second, and 4 seconds for the third.

The 1988 tournament had added a two-series final for the top eight shooters; the 1992 competition broke that down to a four-series semifinal for the top eight and two-series final for the top four. In 1996 and 2000, the top eight once again advanced to the final. The 2004 version had reduced the number of finalists to six, where it stayed in 2008 and 2012.

Prior to 2008, the final involved two series of 5 shots at 4 seconds. In 2008, that was expanded to four series. The 2012 competition used an entirely different format, however, which remained in effect in 2016. The competition switched to a "hit-or-miss" system, where a 9.7 or better scores as a "hit" for 1 point and anything lower scores as a "miss" for 0 points. The final featured 8 series of 5 shots each (5 points maximum per series, 40 points maximum total). However, starting with the fourth series, the remaining shooter with the lowest total was eliminated after each series (5 shooters remaining in the fifth series, 4 in the sixth, 3 in the seventh, and only 2 in the eighth and final series).

The 1992 competition had introduced round targets rather than the silhouettes used from 1948 to 1988 as well as many pre-World War II versions of the event. Score, rather than hits, had been used as the primary ranking method since 1960.

== Records ==
Prior to this competition, the existing world and Olympic records were as follows.

Qualifying records
| World record | Christian Reitz (GER); Kim Jun-hong (KOR) | 593 | Osijek, Croatia; Beijing, China | 30 July 2013; 6 July 2014 |
| Olympic record | Alexei Klimov (RUS) | 592 | London, United Kingdom | 3 August 2012 |

Final records
| World record | Riccardo Mazzetti (ITA); Leonid Ekimov (RUS); Alexei Klimov (RUS) | 35 | Beijing, China; Gabala, Azerbaijan; Rio de Janeiro, Brazil | 6 July 2014; 24 October 2014; 23 April 2016 |
| Olympic record | Leuris Pupo (CUB) | 34 | London, United Kingdom | 3 August 2012 |

Christian Reitz matched the Olympic records in both the qualifying and final rounds.

== Schedule ==
| Date | Time | Round |
|---|---|---|
| Friday, 12 August 2016 | | Qualifying: Course 1 |
| Saturday, 13 August 2016 | 12:30 | Qualifying: Course 2 Final |

== Results ==
=== Qualifying ===
| Rank | Shooter | Nation | Course 1 | | | | Course 2 | | | | Total | Xs | Notes |
| Rank | Shooter | Nation | 8 seconds | 6 seconds | 4 seconds | Total | 8 seconds | 6 seconds | 4 seconds | Total | Total | Xs | Notes |
|---|---|---|---|---|---|---|---|---|---|---|---|---|---|
| 1 | Christian Reitz | Germany | 100 | 99 | 97 | 296 | 100 | 100 | 96 | 296 | 592 | 27 | Q, =OR |
| 2 | Zhang Fusheng | China | 99 | 99 | 94 | 292 | 100 | 99 | 99 | 298 | 590 | 27 | Q |
| 3 | Jean Quiquampoix | France | 99 | 98 | 96 | 293 | 99 | 99 | 95 | 293 | 586 | 19 | Q |
| 4 | Riccardo Mazzetti | Italy | 98 | 98 | 96 | 292 | 97 | 99 | 98 | 294 | 586 | 18 | Q |
| 5 | Li Yuehong | China | 97 | 97 | 96 | 290 | 97 | 99 | 98 | 294 | 584 | 23 | Q |
| 6 | Leuris Pupo | Cuba | 95 | 100 | 95 | 290 | 100 | 98 | 95 | 293 | 583 | 19 | Q |
| 7 | Gurpreet Singh | India | 100 | 99 | 90 | 289 | 97 | 98 | 97 | 292 | 581 | 24 | |
| 8 | Kim Jun-hong | South Korea | 98 | 97 | 92 | 287 | 99 | 98 | 97 | 294 | 581 | 19 | |
| 9 | Alexei Klimov | Russia | 98 | 97 | 94 | 289 | 98 | 96 | 98 | 292 | 581 | 16 | |
| 10 | Keith Sanderson | United States | 99 | 94 | 97 | 290 | 98 | 99 | 93 | 290 | 580 | 19 | |
| 11 | Roman Bondaruk | Ukraine | 97 | 96 | 93 | 286 | 100 | 98 | 95 | 293 | 579 | 18 | |
| 12 | Emil Milev | United States | 96 | 97 | 91 | 284 | 100 | 98 | 96 | 294 | 578 | 19 | |
| 13 | Emerson Duarte | Brazil | 98 | 97 | 90 | 285 | 99 | 100 | 94 | 293 | 578 | 19 | |
| 14 | Jorge Llames | Spain | 97 | 99 | 92 | 288 | 98 | 96 | 95 | 289 | 577 | 14 | |
| 15 | Ruslan Lunev | Azerbaijan | 94 | 97 | 97 | 288 | 97 | 96 | 94 | 287 | 575 | 17 | |
| 16 | Pavlo Korostylov | Ukraine | 96 | 99 | 98 | 293 | 99 | 96 | 86 | 281 | 574 | 18 | |
| 17 | Oliver Geis | Germany | 97 | 99 | 95 | 291 | 94 | 96 | 91 | 281 | 572 | 22 | |
| 18 | Ghulam Mustafa Bashir | Pakistan | 97 | 94 | 96 | 287 | 98 | 94 | 92 | 284 | 571 | 12 | |
| 19 | Eita Mori | Japan | 97 | 96 | 91 | 284 | 95 | 97 | 94 | 286 | 570 | 13 | |
| 20 | Piotr Daniluk | Poland | 97 | 97 | 94 | 288 | 97 | 95 | 87 | 279 | 567 | 12 | |
| 21 | Kang Min-su | South Korea | 97 | 94 | 85 | 276 | 98 | 95 | 95 | 288 | 564 | 19 | |
| 22 | Teruyoshi Akiyama | Japan | 98 | 96 | 94 | 288 | 95 | 93 | 88 | 276 | 564 | 18 | |
| 23 | Ahmed Shaban | Egypt | 96 | 92 | 90 | 278 | 96 | 95 | 93 | 284 | 562 | 6 | |
| 24 | Marko Carrillo | Peru | 94 | 95 | 83 | 272 | 96 | 97 | 92 | 285 | 557 | 14 | |
| 25 | Peeter Olesk | Estonia | 92 | 92 | 86 | 270 | 95 | 95 | 93 | 283 | 553 | 8 | |
| 26 | David Chapman | Australia | 98 | 95 | 76 | 269 | 95 | 96 | 91 | 282 | 551 | 18 | |

=== Final ===
| Rank | Athlete | Nation | 1 | 2 | 3 | 4 | Int | 5 | Int | 6 | Int | 7 | Int | 8 | Total | Notes |
|---|---|---|---|---|---|---|---|---|---|---|---|---|---|---|---|---|
| 1st place, gold medalist(s) | Christian Reitz | Germany | 5 | 4 | 4 | 4 | 17 | 4 | 21 | 4 | 25 | 4 | 29 | 5 | 34 | =OR |
| 2nd place, silver medalist(s) | Jean Quiquampoix | France | 2 | 4 | 5 | 3 | 14 | 5 | 19 | 5 | 24 | 3 | 27 | 3 | 30 | |
| 3rd place, bronze medalist(s) | Li Yuehong | China | 3 | 5 | 4 | 4 | 16 | 4 | 20 | 2 | 22 | 5 | 27 | —N/a | | |
| 4 | Zhang Fusheng | China | 5 | 4 | 5 | 4 | 18 | 2 | 20 | 1 | 21 | —N/a | | | | |
| 5 | Leuris Pupo | Cuba | 5 | 3 | 3 | 4 | 15 | 3 | 18 | —N/a | | | | | | |
| 6 | Riccardo Mazzetti | Italy | 2 | 2 | 4 | 2 | 10 | —N/a | | | | | | | | |
