= Shooting at the 2015 European Games – Men's 25 metre rapid fire pistol =

Men's 25 m rapid fire pistol at the 2015 European Games
- Venue: Baku Shooting Centre
- Date: 21 June
- Competitors: 21 from 14 nations

Medalists
gold medal	Christian Reitz	Germany
silver medal	Alexei Klimov	Russia
bronze medal	Oliver Geis	Germany

The men's 25 metre rapid fire pistol competition at the 2015 European Games in Baku, Azerbaijan was held on 21 June at the Baku Shooting Centre.

== Schedule ==
All times are local (UTC+5).

Date	Time	Event
Sunday, 21 June 2015	09:00	Qualification
Sunday, 21 June 2015	17:00	Final

== Results ==
=== Qualification ===
Rank	Athlete	Stage 1			Stage 2			Total	Xs	Notes
Rank	Athlete	8	6	4	8	6	4	Total	Xs	Notes
1	Oliver Geis (GER)	98	99	96	100	96	99	588	14	GR
2	Alexei Klimov (RUS)	99	100	96	98	98	94	585	15	
3	Christian Reitz (GER)	97	98	94	98	100	97	584	27	
4	Jorge Llames (ESP)	94	99	95	98	100	97	583	15	
5	Fabrice Daumal (FRA)	99	96	99	98	97	94	583	15	
6	Roman Bondaruk (UKR)	95	99	98	99	98	93	582	16	
7	Clément Bessaguet (FRA)	100	99	93	95	98	96	581	22	
8	Martin Podhráský (CZE)	99	97	98	98	93	95	580	19	
9	Riccardo Mazzetti (ITA)	97	97	95	99	100	91	579	22	
10	Leonid Ekimov (RUS)	98	98	92	96	97	97	578	18	
11	Pål Hembre (NOR)	97	97	91	99	98	93	575	17	
12	Ruslan Lunev (AZE)	99	97	94	95	96	94	575	13	
13	Martin Strnad (CZE)	96	94	97	94	99	94	574	11	
14	Denys Kushnirov (UKR)	97	97	92	98	97	91	572	16	
15	Andrea Spilotro (ITA)	96	97	92	97	97	89	568	10	
16	Konrad Bialek (POL)	93	98	89	97	95	95	567	13	
17	Alexei Kiriyevski (ISR)	94	94	90	98	98	89	563	11	
18	István Jambrik (HUN)	96	98	84	100	92	92	562	15	
19	Piotr Daniluk (POL)	97	93	93	95	95	88	561	12	
20	Peeter Olesk (EST)	98	96	89	94	97	85	559	10	
21	Sasa Spirelja (CRO)	94	92	94	96	94	89	559	6	

=== Final ===
Rank	Athlete	Stages								Notes
Rank	Athlete	1	2	3	4	5	6	7	8	Notes
1st place, gold medalist(s)	Christian Reitz (GER)	5	9	12	17	21	24	29	33	GR
2nd place, silver medalist(s)	Alexei Klimov (RUS)	3	6	11	15	18	23	27	29	
3rd place, bronze medalist(s)	Oliver Geis (GER)	3	7	10	14	18	23	27		
4	Jorge Llames (ESP)	4	5	9	13	16	20			
5	Roman Bondaruk (UKR)	3	3	6	8	11				
6	Fabrice Daumal (FRA)	0	3	4	7					
