= Shooting at the 2023 European Games – Men's team 25 metre rapid fire pistol =

Men's team 25 metre rapid fire pistol at the 2023 European Games
- Venue: Wrocław Shooting Centre
- Dates: 1 July
- Competitors: 18 from 6 nations
- Teams: 6

Medalists
gold medal	Clément Bessaguet; Yan Chesnel; Jean Quiquampoix	France
silver medal	Martin Podhráský; Matěj Rampula; Martin Strnad	Czech Republic
bronze medal	Riccardo Mazzetti; Andrea Morassut; Massimo Spinella	Italy

The men's team 25 metre rapid fire pistol event at the 2023 European Games took place on 1 July at the Wrocław Shooting Centre.

== Records ==
Prior to this competition, the existing world, European and Games records were as follows.

Qualification
World Record	—	—	—	—
European Record	Germany; Oliver Geis; Florian Peter; Christian Reitz	884	Osijek, Croatia	1 July 2021
Games Record	—	—	—	—

== Results ==
=== Qualification 1 ===
Rank	Country	Athlete	8s	6s	4s	Total	Team total	Notes
1	Ukraine	Maksym Horodynets	98	99	96	293-8x	870-21x	Q, GR
1	Ukraine	Pavlo Korostylov	100	96	95	291-7x	870-21x	Q, GR
1	Ukraine	Denys Kushnirov	98	99	89	286-6x	870-21x	Q, GR
2	Czech Republic	Martin Strnad	98	98	94	290-8x	865-26x	Q
2	Czech Republic	Martin Podhráský	99	97	94	290-8x	865-26x	Q
2	Czech Republic	Matěj Rampula	100	97	88	285-10x	865-26x	Q
3	Poland	Patryk Sakowski	98	95	97	290-9x	865-24x	Q
3	Poland	Oskar Miliwek	99	92	97	288-10x	865-24x	Q
3	Poland	Damian Klimek	97	97	93	287-5x	865-24x	Q
4	France	Jean Quiquampoix	100	100	95	295-9x	865-24x	Q
4	France	Yan Chesnel	96	98	94	288-4x	865-24x	Q
4	France	Clément Bessaguet	97	99	86	282-11x	865-24x	Q
5	Italy	Riccardo Mazzetti	97	98	94	289-7x	862-25x	Q
5	Italy	Massimo Spinella	97	98	93	288-10x	862-25x	Q
5	Italy	Andrea Morassut	91	96	98	285-8x	862-25x	Q
6	Estonia	Peeter Olesk	98	98	94	290-12x	842-25x	Q
6	Estonia	Nemo Tabur	95	92	93	280-7x	842-25x	Q
6	Estonia	Fred Raukas	95	89	88	272-6x	842-25x	Q

=== Qualification 2 ===
Rank	Country	Athlete	6s	4s	Total	Team total	Notes
1	France	Clément Bessaguet	96	97	193-5x	575-17x	QG
1	France	Yan Chesnel	95	97	192-4x	575-17x	QG
1	France	Jean Quiquampoix	95	95	190-8x	575-17x	QG
2	Czech Republic	Martin Strnad	96	94	190-4x	568-11x	QG
2	Czech Republic	Matěj Rampula	96	94	190-3x	568-11x	QG
2	Czech Republic	Martin Podhráský	94	94	188-4x	568-11x	QG
3	Ukraine	Pavlo Korostylov	96	95	191-7x	563-14x	QB
3	Ukraine	Maksym Horodynets	93	93	186-4x	563-14x	QB
3	Ukraine	Denys Kushnirov	93	93	186-3x	563-14x	QB
4	Italy	Andrea Morassut	95	96	191-2x	560-4x	QB
4	Italy	Massimo Spinella	91	96	187-0x	560-4x	QB
4	Italy	Riccardo Mazzetti	89	93	182-2x	560-4x	QB
5	Poland	Oskar Miliwek	96	92	188-2x	545-9x	
5	Poland	Damian Klimek	90	90	180-3x	545-9x	
5	Poland	Patryk Sakowski	85	92	177-4x	545-9x	
6	Estonia	Fred Raukas	89	92	181-2x	533-11x	
6	Estonia	Peeter Olesk	95	83	178-6x	533-11x	
6	Estonia	Nemo Tabur	85	89	174-3x	533-11x	

=== Finals ===
Rank	Country	Athletes	Total
Gold medal match
1st place, gold medalist(s)	France	Clément Bessaguet; Yan Chesnel; Jean Quiquampoix	16
2nd place, silver medalist(s)	Czech Republic	Martin Podhráský; Matěj Rampula; Martin Strnad	2
Bronze medal match
3rd place, bronze medalist(s)	Italy	Riccardo Mazzetti; Andrea Morassut; Massimo Spinella	16
4	Ukraine	Maksym Horodynets; Pavlo Korostylov; Denys Kushnirov	4
