= Italy at the 2023 European Games =

Italy at multi-sport event

- IOC code: ITA
- NOC: Italian National Olympic Committee
- Website: www.coni.it

in Kraków-Małopolska, Poland 21 June 2023 – 2 July 2023
- Flag bearers: Odette Giuffrida; Mauro Nespoli
- Medals Ranked 1st: Gold 35 Silver 26 Bronze 39 Total 100

European Games appearances (overview)
- 2015; 2019; 2023; 2027

Italy competed at the 2023 European Games, in Kraków-Małopolska, Poland from 21 June to 30 June 2023 resulting in the winner in the medal table.

== Medalists ==
| Medal | Name | Sport | Event |
|---|---|---|---|
| Gold | Federico Musolesi; Mauro Nespoli; Alessandro Paoli | Archery | Men's team recurve |
| Gold | Elisa Roner | Archery | Women's individual compound |
| Gold | Giorgio Minisini; Lucrezia Ruggiero | Artistic Swimming | Mixed duet technical routine |
| Gold | Italy | Athletics | First Division |
| Gold | Samuele Ceccarelli | Athletics | Men's 100 m |
| Gold | Alessandro Sibilio | Athletics | Men's 400 m hurdles |
| Gold | Gianmarco Tamberi | Athletics | Men's high jump |
| Gold | Tobia Bocchi | Athletics | Men's triple jump |
| Gold | Zane Weir | Athletics | Men's shot put |
| Gold | Sara Fantini | Athletics | Women's hammer throw |
| Gold | Aziz Abbes Mouhiidine | Boxing | Men's heavyweight (92 kg) |
| Gold | Carlo Tacchini; Gabriele Casadei | Canoe Sprint | Men's C-2 500 metres |
| Gold | Chiara Pellacani | Diving | Women's 3 metre springboard |
| Gold | Chiara Pellacani; Matteo Santoro | Diving | Mixed synchronized 3 metre springboard |
| Gold | Alessio Foconi; Daniele Garozzo; Filippo Macchi; Tommaso Marini | Fencing | Men's team foil |
| Gold | Martina Batini; Martina Favaretto; Francesca Palumbo; Alice Volpi | Fencing | Women's team foil |
| Gold | Gabriele Lanzilao | Kickboxing | Men's pointfighting -63 kg |
| Gold | Ivan Penzo | Kickboxing | Men's light contact -63 kg |
| Gold | Federica Trovalusci | Kickboxing | Women's pointfighting -50 kg |
| Gold | Francesca Ceci | Kickboxing | Women's pointfighting -60 kg |
| Gold | Domenica Angelino | Kickboxing | Women's pointfighting -70 kg |
| Gold | Luna Mendy | Kickboxing | Women's light contact -60 kg |
| Gold | Giorgio Malan | Modern pentathlon | Men's individual |
| Gold | Alice Sotero | Modern pentathlon | Women's individual |
| Gold | Carolina Orsi; Giorgia Marchetti | Padel | Women's doubles |
| Gold | Danilo Sollazzo | Shooting | Men's 10 metre air rifle |
| Gold | Mauro De Filippis | Shooting | Men's trap |
| Gold | Martina Bartolomei | Shooting | Women's skeet |
| Gold | Jessica Rossi | Shooting | Women's trap |
| Gold | Martina Bartolomei; Chiara Di Marziantonio; Simona Scocchetti | Shooting | Women's team skeet |
| Gold | Giulia Grassia; Jessica Rossi; Silvana Stanco | Shooting | Women's team trap |
| Gold | Paolo Monna; Sara Costantino | Shooting | Mixed team 10 metre air pistol |
| Gold | Gabriele Rossetti; Simona Scocchetti | Shooting | Mixed team skeet |
| Gold | Giovanni Pellielo; Jessica Rossi | Shooting | Mixed team trap |
| Gold | Dennis Baretta | Taekwondo | Men's 63 kg |
| Silver | Marco Bruno | Archery | Men's individual compound |
| Silver | Giorgio Minisini; Lucrezia Ruggiero | Artistic Swimming | Mixed duet free routine |
| Silver | Linda Cerruti; Marta Iacoacci; Sofia Mastroianni; Enrica Piccoli; Lucrezia Ruggiero; Isotta Sportelli; Giulia Vernice; Francesca Zunino; Carmen Rocchino; Giorgio Minisini | Artistic Swimming | Team technical routine |
| Silver | Linda Cerruti; Marta Iacoacci; Sofia Mastroianni; Giorgio Minisini; Enrica Piccoli; Lucrezia Ruggiero; Isotta Sportelli; Francesca Zunino; Carmen Rocchino; Giulia Vernice | Artistic Swimming | Team free routine |
| Silver | Lorenzo Patta; Samuele Ceccarelli; Marco Ricci; Filippo Tortu | Athletics | Men's 4 x 100 m |
| Silver | Mattia Furlani | Athletics | Men's long jump |
| Silver | Nadia Battocletti | Athletics | Women's 5000 m |
| Silver | Ayomide Folorunso | Athletics | Women's 400 m hurdles |
| Silver | Daisy Osakue | Athletics | Women's discus throw |
| Silver | Italy national beach soccer team: Sebastiano Paterniti; Alessandro Miceli; Gianmarco Genovali; Fabio Sciacca; Tommaso Fazzini; Emmanuele Zurlo; Marco Giordani; Luca Bertacca; Samuele Sassari; Alessandro Remedi; Ovidio Alla; Leandro Casapieri | Beach soccer | Men's tournament |
| Silver | Lorenzo Marsaglia; Giovanni Tocci | Diving | Men's synchronized 3 metre springboard |
| Silver | Riccardo Giovannini; Eduard Timbretti Gugiu | Diving | Men's synchronized 10 metre platform |
| Silver | Sarah Jodoin Di Maria; Lorenzo Marsaglia; Chiara Pellacani; Eduard Timbretti Gugiu | Diving | Team event |
| Silver | Luca Curatoli; Michele Gallo; Matteo Neri; Luigi Samele | Fencing | Men's team sabre |
| Silver | Martina Criscio; Rossella Gregorio; Chiara Mormile; Eloisa Passaro | Fencing | Women's team sabre |
| Silver | Daniele De Vivo | Karate | Men's kumite 75 kg |
| Silver | Erminia Perfetto | Karate | Women's kumite 50 kg |
| Silver | Clio Ferracuti | Karate | Women's kumite +68 kg |
| Silver | Damiano Tramontana | Kickboxing | Men's full contact -63.5 kg |
| Silver | Nicole Perona | Kickboxing | Women's full contact -52 kg |
| Silver | Enrico Pellegrino Pellegri | Muaythai | Men's 91 kg |
| Silver | Marco Cassetta; Giulia Sussarello | Padel | Mixed doubles |
| Silver | Tammaro Cassandro; Gabriele Rossetti; Elia Sdruccioli | Shooting | Men's team skeet |
| Silver | Giorgio Tomatis | Sport climbing | Men's lead |
| Silver | Giulia Medici | Sport climbing | Women's bouldering |
| Silver | Sofia Zampetti | Taekwondo | Women's 46 kg |
| Bronze | Chiara Rebagliati | Archery | Women's individual recurve |
| Bronze | Tatiana Andreoli; Lucilla Boari; Chiara Rebagliati | Archery | Women's team recurve |
| Bronze | Marco Bruno; Elisa Roner | Archery | Mixed team compound |
| Bronze | Linda Cerruti; Marta Iacoacci; Sofia Mastroianni; Giorgio Minisini; Enrica Piccoli; Carmen Rocchino; Isotta Sportelli; Francesca Zunino; Lucrezia Ruggiero; Giulia Vernice | Artistic Swimming | Team acrobatic routine |
| Bronze | Yemaneberhan Crippa | Athletics | Men's 5000 m |
| Bronze | Larissa Iapichino | Athletics | Women's long jump |
| Bronze | Ottavia Cestonaro | Athletics | Women's triple jump |
| Bronze | Federico Serra | Boxing | Men's flyweight (51 kg) |
| Bronze | Salvatore Cavallaro | Boxing | Men's light heavyweight (80 kg) |
| Bronze | Giordana Sorrentino | Boxing | Women's light flyweight (50 kg) |
| Bronze | Irma Testa | Boxing | Women's featherweight (57 kg) |
| Bronze | Stefanie Horn | Canoe Slalom | Women's kayak Cross |
| Bronze | Luca Braidot | Cycling | Men's cross-country |
| Bronze | Lorenzo Marsaglia | Diving | Men's 1 metre springboard |
| Bronze | Riccardo Giovannini | Diving | Men's 10 metre platform |
| Bronze | Sarah Jodoin Di Maria | Diving | Women's 10 metre platform |
| Bronze | Elena Bertocchi; Chiara Pellacani | Diving | Women's synchronized 3 metre springboard |
| Bronze | Sarah Jodoin Di Maria; Eduard Timbretti Gugiu | Diving | Mixed synchronized 10 metre platform |
| Bronze | Gabriele Cimini; Davide Di Veroli; Andrea Santarelli; Federico Vismara | Fencing | Men's team épée |
| Bronze | Rossella Fiamingo; Federica Isola; Mara Navarria; Alberta Santuccio | Fencing | Women's team épée |
| Bronze | Eloisa Passaro | Fencing | Women's sabre |
| Bronze | Kwadjo Anani; Cecilia Betemps; Thauany David Capanni Dias; Luigi Centracchio; Odette Giuffrida; Edoardo Mella; Nicholas Mungai; Christian Parlati; Irene Pedrotti; Gennaro Pirelli; Giorgia Stangherlin; Asya Tavano | Judo | Mixed team |
| Bronze | Mattia Busato | Karate | Men's individual kata |
| Bronze | Angelo Crescenzo | Karate | Men's kumite 60 kg |
| Bronze | Michele Martina | Karate | Men's kumite 84 kg |
| Bronze | Alessandra Mangiacapra | Karate | Women's kumite 61 kg |
| Bronze | Edoardo Bagarello | Kickboxing | Men's pointfighting -74 kg |
| Bronze | Riccardo Albanese | Kickboxing | Men's pointfighting -84 kg |
| Bronze | Matteo Cicinelli; Giorgio Malan; Roberto Micheli | Modern pentathlon | Men's team |
| Bronze | Chiara Pappacena; Giulia Sussarello | Padel | Women's doubles |
| Bronze | Paolo Monna | Shooting | Men's 10 metre air pistol |
| Bronze | Federico Nilo Maldini; Paolo Monna; Massimo Spinella | Shooting | Men's team 10 metre air pistol |
| Bronze | Riccardo Mazzetti; Andrea Morassut; Massimo Spinella | Shooting | Men's team 25 metre rapid fire pistol |
| Bronze | Sara Costantino; Chiara Giancamilli; Maria Varricchio | Shooting | Women's team 10 metre air pistol |
| Bronze | Dennis Sollazzo; Sofia Ceccarello | Shooting | Mixed team 10 metre air rifle |
| Bronze | Mauro De Filippis; Giulia Grassia | Shooting | Mixed team trap |
| Bronze | Beatrice Colli | Sport climbing | Women's speed |
| Bronze | Andrea Conti | Taekwondo | Men's 54 kg |
| Bronze | Natalia D'Angelo | Taekwondo | Women's 67 kg |

Multiple medalists
| Name | Sport | 1st place, gold medalist(s) | 2nd place, silver medalist(s) | 3rd place, bronze medalist(s) | Total |
| Jessica Rossi | Shooting | 3 | 0 | 0 | 3 |
| Chiara Pellacani | Diving | 2 | 1 | 1 | 4 |
| Martina Bartolomei | Shooting | 2 | 0 | 0 | 2 |
| Simona Scocchetti | Shooting | 2 | 0 | 0 | 2 |
| Giorgio Minisini | Artistic Swimming | 1 | 3 | 1 | 5 |
| Lucrezia Ruggiero | Artistic Swimming | 1 | 3 | 1 | 5 |
| Samuele Ceccarelli | Athletics | 1 | 1 | 0 | 2 |
| Gabriele Rossetti | Shooting | 1 | 1 | 0 | 2 |
| Paolo Monna | Shooting | 1 | 0 | 2 | 3 |
| Elisa Roner | Archery | 1 | 0 | 1 | 2 |
| Giorgio Malan | Modern pentathlon | 1 | 0 | 1 | 2 |
| Sara Costantino | Shooting | 1 | 0 | 1 | 2 |
| Danilo Sollazzo | Shooting | 1 | 0 | 1 | 2 |
| Giulia Grassia | Shooting | 1 | 0 | 1 | 2 |
| Mauro De Filippis | Shooting | 1 | 0 | 1 | 2 |
| Linda Cerruti | Artistic Swimming | 0 | 2 | 1 | 3 |
| Marta Iacoacci | Artistic Swimming | 0 | 2 | 1 | 3 |
| Sofia Mastroianni | Artistic Swimming | 0 | 2 | 1 | 3 |
| Enrica Piccoli | Artistic Swimming | 0 | 2 | 1 | 3 |
| Carmen Rocchino | Artistic Swimming | 0 | 2 | 1 | 3 |
| Isotta Sportelli | Artistic Swimming | 0 | 2 | 1 | 3 |
| Francesca Zunino | Artistic Swimming | 0 | 2 | 1 | 3 |
| Giulia Vernice | Artistic Swimming | 0 | 2 | 1 | 3 |
| Lorenzo Marsaglia | Diving | 0 | 2 | 1 | 3 |
| Eduard Timbretti Gugiu | Diving | 0 | 2 | 1 | 3 |
| Sarah Jodoin Di Maria | Diving | 0 | 1 | 2 | 3 |
| Marco Bruno | Archery | 0 | 1 | 1 | 2 |
| Eloisa Passaro | Fencing | 0 | 1 | 1 | 2 |
| Riccardo Giovannini | Diving | 0 | 1 | 1 | 2 |
| Giulia Sussarello | Padel | 0 | 1 | 1 | 2 |
| Chiara Rebagliati | Archery | 0 | 0 | 2 | 2 |
| Massimo Spinella | Shooting | 0 | 0 | 2 | 2 |

Medal by sport
| Sport | 1st place, gold medalist(s) | 2nd place, silver medalist(s) | 3rd place, bronze medalist(s) | Total | Rank |
| Archery | 2 | 1 | 3 | 6 | 1st |
| Artistic swimming | 1 | 3 | 1 | 5 | 3rd |
| Athletics | 7 | 5 | 3 | 15 | 1st |
| Beach soccer | 0 | 1 | 0 | 1 | 3rd |
| Boxing | 1 | 0 | 4 | 5 | 5th |
| Canoe slalom | 0 | 0 | 1 | 1 | 11th |
| Canoe sprint | 1 | 0 | 0 | 1 | 7th |
| Cycling | 0 | 0 | 1 | 1 | 9th |
| Diving | 2 | 3 | 5 | 10 | 4th |
| Fencing | 2 | 2 | 3 | 7 | 2nd |
| Judo | 0 | 0 | 1 | 1 | 3rd |
| Karate | 0 | 3 | 4 | 7 | 9th |
| Kickboxing | 6 | 2 | 2 | 10 | 1st |
| Modern pentathlon | 2 | 0 | 1 | 3 | 1st |
| Muaythai | 0 | 1 | 0 | 1 | 9th |
| Padel | 1 | 1 | 1 | 3 | 2nd |
| Shooting | 9 | 1 | 6 | 16 | 1st |
| Sport climbing | 0 | 2 | 1 | 3 | 4th |
| Taekwondo | 1 | 1 | 2 | 4 | 5th |

== Competitors ==
| Sport | Men | Women | Total |
|---|---|---|---|
| Archery | 4 | 4 | 8 |
| Artistic swimming | 1 | 9 | 10 |
| Athletics | 20 | 21 | 41 |
| Badminton | 4 | 4 | 8 |
| Basketball | 0 | 0 | 0 |
| Beach handball | 0 | 0 | 0 |
| Beach soccer | 12 | 0 | 12 |
| Boxing | 7 | 6 | 13 |
| Breaking | 1 | 2 | 3 |
| Canoe slalom | 8 | 6 | 14 |
| Canoe sprint | 8 | 4 | 12 |
| Cycling | 6 | 3 | 9 |
| Diving | 5 | 6 | 11 |
| Fencing | 14 | 13 | 27 |
| Judo | 6 | 6 | 12 |
| Karate | 4 | 5 | 9 |
| Kickboxing | 8 | 6 | 14 |
| Modern pentathlon | 4 | 4 | 8 |
| Muaythai | 3 | 2 | 5 |
| Padel | 4 | 4 | 8 |
| Rugby sevens | 13 | 13 | 26 |
| Shooting | 15 | 12 | 27 |
| Ski jumping | 0 | 0 | 0 |
| Sport climbing | 5 | 5 | 10 |
| Table tennis | 3 | 3 | 6 |
| Taekwondo | 5 | 7 | 12 |
| Teqball | 2 | 1 | 3 |
| Triathlon | 3 | 3 | 6 |
| Total | 165 | 149 | 314 |

== See also ==
- Italy at the 2019 European Games
