= Shooting at the 2023 European Games – Men's team 10 metre air pistol =

Men's team 10 metre air pistol at the 2023 European Games
- Venue: Wrocław Shooting Centre
- Dates: 24 June
- Competitors: 24 from 8 nations
- Teams: 8

Medalists
gold medal	Christian Reitz; Michael Schwald; Robin Walter	Germany
silver medal	Yusuf Dikeç; İsmail Keleş; Buğra Selimzade	Turkey
bronze medal	Federico Maldini; Paolo Monna; Massimo Spinella	Italy

The men's team 10 metre air pistol event at the 2023 European Games took place on 24 June at the Wrocław Shooting Centre.

== Records ==
Prior to this competition, the existing world, European and Games records were as follows.

Qualification
World Record	—	—	—	—
European Record	Ukraine; Viktor Bankin; Pavlo Korostylov; Oleh Omelchuk	877	Baku, Azerbaijan	31 May 2022
Games Record	—	—	—	—

== Results ==
=== Qualification 1 ===
Rank	Country	Athlete	Series			Total	Team total	Notes
Rank	Country	Athlete	1	2	3	Total	Team total	Notes
1	Germany	Robin Walter	98	96	99	293-13x	876-34x	Q, GR
1	Germany	Christian Reitz	97	99	96	292-11x	876-34x	Q, GR
1	Germany	Michael Schwald	98	97	96	291-10x	876-34x	Q, GR
2	Turkey	Buğra Selimzade	98	98	98	294-13x	870-34x	Q
2	Turkey	İsmail Keleş	98	95	95	288-13x	870-34x	Q
2	Turkey	Yusuf Dikeç	95	96	97	288-8x	870-34x	Q
3	Ukraine	Oleh Omelchuk	99	95	96	290-10x	866-32x	Q
3	Ukraine	Viktor Bankin	95	98	95	288-12x	866-32x	Q
3	Ukraine	Pavlo Korostylov	96	96	96	288-10x	866-32x	Q
4	Czech Republic	Pavel Schejbal	97	95	97	289-13x	864-23x	Q
4	Czech Republic	Jindřich Dubový	97	96	96	289-4x	864-23x	Q
4	Czech Republic	Matěj Rampula	96	94	96	286-6x	864-23x	Q
5	Italy	Paolo Monna	97	98	95	290-8x	858-18x	Q
5	Italy	Massimo Spinella	94	94	97	285-6x	858-18x	Q
5	Italy	Federico Maldini	94	94	95	283-4x	858-18x	Q
6	Latvia	Lauris Strautmanis	95	98	96	289-9x	857-26x	Q
6	Latvia	Emīls Vasermanis	95	96	97	288-11x	857-26x	Q
6	Latvia	Daniels Vilciņš	94	94	92	280-6x	857-26x	Q
7	Serbia	Damir Mikec	97	98	94	289-8x	857-21x	Q
7	Serbia	Dimitrije Grgić	95	97	95	287-9x	857-21x	Q
7	Serbia	Duško Petrov	94	94	93	281-4x	857-21x	Q
8	Georgia	Tsotne Machavariani	99	92	95	286-10x	850-27x	Q
8	Georgia	Kako Mosulishvili	97	98	90	285-8x	850-27x	Q
8	Georgia	Levan Kadagidze	94	96	89	279-9x	850-27x	Q

=== Qualification 2 ===
Rank	Country	Athlete	Series		Total	Team total	Notes
Rank	Country	Athlete	1	2	Total	Team total	Notes
1	Turkey	İsmail Keleş	99	99	198-12x	582-22x	QG
1	Turkey	Buğra Selimzade	97	99	196-6x	582-22x	QG
1	Turkey	Yusuf Dikeç	96	92	188-4x	582-22x	QG
2	Germany	Robin Walter	97	97	196-11x	577-24x	QG
2	Germany	Christian Reitz	96	97	193-7x	577-24x	QG
2	Germany	Michael Schwald	96	92	188-6x	577-24x	QG
3	Georgia	Tsotne Machavariani	99	94	193-7x	577-19x	QB
3	Georgia	Kako Mosulishvili	97	96	193-6x	577-19x	QB
3	Georgia	Levan Kadagidze	98	93	191-6x	577-19x	QB
4	Italy	Paolo Monna	97	97	194-7x	571-15x	QB
4	Italy	Federico Maldini	95	94	189-4x	571-15x	QB
4	Italy	Massimo Spinella	92	96	188-4x	571-15x	QB
5	Czech Republic	Jindřich Dubový	97	96	193-9x	569-19x	
5	Czech Republic	Pavel Schejbal	95	96	191-7x	569-19x	
5	Czech Republic	Matěj Rampula	95	90	185-3x	569-19x	
6	Serbia	Damir Mikec	97	99	196-8x	569-14x	
6	Serbia	Dimitrije Grgić	93	97	190-5x	569-14x	
6	Serbia	Duško Petrov	93	90	183-1x	569-14x	
7	Ukraine	Oleh Omelchuk	95	99	194-6x	569-13x	
7	Ukraine	Viktor Bankin	94	94	188-4x	569-13x	
7	Ukraine	Pavlo Korostylov	93	94	187-3x	569-13x	
8	Latvia	Lauris Strautmanis	96	95	191-4x	565-13x	
8	Latvia	Emīls Vasermanis	97	92	189-7x	565-13x	
8	Latvia	Daniels Vilciņš	93	92	185-2x	565-13x	

=== Finals ===
Rank	Country	Athletes	Total
Gold medal match
1st place, gold medalist(s)	Germany	Christian Reitz; Michael Schwald; Robin Walter	16
2nd place, silver medalist(s)	Turkey	Yusuf Dikeç; İsmail Keleş; Buğra Selimzade	14
Bronze medal match
3rd place, bronze medalist(s)	Italy	Federico Maldini; Paolo Monna; Massimo Spinella	17
4	Georgia	Levan Kadagidze; Tsotne Machavariani; Kako Mosulishvili	7
