= National Shooting Center (disambiguation) =

The National Shooting Center is a firing range in Deodoro, Rio de Janeiro, Brazil.

National Shooting Center may also refer to:

- National Shooting Centre, Bisley, United Kingdom
- National Shooting Centre (France)
