= Shooting at the 2023 European Games – Mixed team 25 metre rapid fire pistol =

Mixed team 25 metre rapid fire pistol at the 2023 European Games
- Venue: Wrocław Shooting Centre
- Dates: 27 June
- Competitors: 18 from 8 nations
- Teams: 9

Medalists
| gold medal | Yuliya Korostylova; Pavlo Korostylov | Ukraine |
| silver medal | Alžběta Dědová; Matěj Rampula | Czech Republic |
| bronze medal | Ann Helen Aune; Ole-Harald Aas | Norway |

The mixed team 25 metre rapid fire pistol event at the 2023 European Games took place on 27 June at the Wrocław Shooting Centre.

== Records ==
Prior to this competition, the existing world, European and Games records were as follows.

Qualification
| World Record | — | — | — | — |
| European Record | Russia; Svetlana Medvedeva; Leonid Yekimov | 574 | Osijek, Croatia | 30 June 2021 |
| Games Record | — | — | — | — |

== Results ==
=== Qualification 1 ===
| Rank | Country | Athlete | 8s | 6s | 4s | Total | Team total | Notes |
|---|---|---|---|---|---|---|---|---|
| 1 | Ukraine 2 | Anastasiia Nimets | 96 | 95 | 92 | 283-8x | 573-16x | Q, GR |
| 1 | Ukraine 2 | Maksym Horodynets | 99 | 97 | 94 | 290-8x | 573-16x | Q, GR |
| 2 | Ukraine 1 | Yuliya Korostylova | 94 | 94 | 93 | 281-7x | 572-16x | Q |
| 2 | Ukraine 1 | Pavlo Korostylov | 99 | 96 | 96 | 291-9x | 572-16x | Q |
| 3 | Czech Republic | Alžběta Dědová | 96 | 88 | 87 | 271-4x | 563-18x | Q |
| 3 | Czech Republic | Matěj Rampula | 99 | 99 | 94 | 292-14x | 563-18x | Q |
| 4 | Great Britain | Jessica Liddon | 91 | 89 | 87 | 267-5x | 555-11x | Q |
| 4 | Great Britain | Sam Gowin | 99 | 95 | 94 | 288-6x | 555-11x | Q |
| 5 | Poland | Julita Borek | 93 | 92 | 77 | 262-3x | 546-13x | Q |
| 5 | Poland | Oskar Miliwek | 97 | 97 | 90 | 284-10x | 546-13x | Q |
| 6 | Turkey | Şevval İlayda Tarhan | 96 | 92 | 73 | 261-6x | 538-10x | Q |
| 6 | Turkey | Yusuf Dikeç | 97 | 93 | 87 | 277-4x | 538-10x | Q |
| 7 | Norway | Ann Helen Aune | 91 | 90 | 68 | 249-2x | 536-8x | Q |
| 7 | Norway | Ole-Harald Aas | 95 | 97 | 95 | 287-6x | 536-8x | Q |
| 8 | Slovenia | Denis Bola Ujčič | 78 | 88 | 86 | 252-5x | 532-11x | Q |
| 8 | Slovenia | Jože Čeper | 95 | 98 | 87 | 280-6x | 532-11x | Q |
| 9 | Azerbaijan | Nigar Nasirova | 92 | 88 | 64 | 244-2x | 525-9x | |
| 9 | Azerbaijan | Ruslan Lunev | 97 | 93 | 91 | 281-7x | 525-9x | |

=== Qualification 2 ===
| Rank | Country | Athlete | 6s | 4s | Total | Team total | Notes |
|---|---|---|---|---|---|---|---|
| 1 | Ukraine 1 | Yuliya Korostylova | 90 | 93 | 183-2x | 377-8x | QG |
| 1 | Ukraine 1 | Pavlo Korostylov | 99 | 95 | 194-6x | 377-8x | QG |
| 2 | Czech Republic | Alžběta Dědová | 94 | 88 | 182-5x | 374-13x | QG |
| 2 | Czech Republic | Matěj Rampula | 99 | 93 | 192-8x | 374-13x | QG |
| 3 | Slovenia | Denis Bola Ujčič | 94 | 89 | 183-1x | 365-5x | QB |
| 3 | Slovenia | Jože Čeper | 96 | 86 | 182-4x | 365-5x | QB |
| 4 | Norway | Ann Helen Aune | 91 | 82 | 173-1x | 362-6x | QB |
| 4 | Norway | Ole-Harald Aas | 97 | 92 | 189-5x | 362-6x | QB |
| 5 | Ukraine 2 | Anastasiia Nimets | 94 | 77 | 171-2x | 360-9x | |
| 5 | Ukraine 2 | Maksym Horodynets | 96 | 93 | 189-7x | 360-9x | |
| 6 | Great Britain | Jessica Liddon | 95 | 78 | 173-3x | 359-5x | |
| 6 | Great Britain | Sam Gowin | 96 | 90 | 186-2x | 359-5x | |
| 7 | Turkey | Şevval İlayda Tarhan | 89 | 85 | 174-0x | 354-1x | |
| 7 | Turkey | Yusuf Dikeç | 93 | 87 | 180-1x | 354-1x | |
| 8 | Poland | Julita Borek | 76 | 78 | 154-0x | 350-5x | |
| 8 | Poland | Oskar Miliwek | 99 | 97 | 196-5x | 350-5x | |

=== Finals ===
| Rank | Country | Athletes | Total |
|---|---|---|---|
Gold medal match
| 1st place, gold medalist(s) | Ukraine 1 | Yuliya Korostylova; Pavlo Korostylov | 16 |
| 2nd place, silver medalist(s) | Czech Republic | Alžběta Dědová; Matěj Rampula | 6 |
Bronze medal match
| 3rd place, bronze medalist(s) | Norway | Ann Helen Aune; Ole-Harald Aas | 17 |
| 4 | Slovenia | Denis Bola Ujčič; Jože Čeper | 11 |
