= Padel at the 2023 European Games =

- Venue: Main Square, Kraków
- Dates: 21–25 June
- Competitors: 126 from 24 nations

Padel at the 2023 European Games takes place at the Main Square in Kraków. This will be the first staging of the sport in any major continental multi-sports event and marks a significant step in the evolution of the relatively young sport.

Padel is a racket sport sharing some similarities with real tennis, tennis, squash and paddleball. It is played solely in pairs.

The competition consists of three events; men's doubles, women's doubles and mixed doubles and is scheduled to take place between 21 and 25 June 2023.

== Qualification ==
The National Committees qualified for the final phase of the Padel World Championships will qualify two pairs in the respective gender while the National Committees that participated in the European qualification for these Championships will qualify only one pair in the respective sex. .

National Committees that have qualified for the World Championship Finals will qualify two pairs for the Mixed Doubles competitions. Only athletes registered in the men's and women's events can participate in the mixed event.

== Venue ==
The competition will be held at the Kraków main square on a specially built temporary court.

== Medal summary ==
=== Medal table ===
* Host nation (Poland)

Rank	Nation	Gold	Silver	Bronze	Total
1	Spain	2	2	1	5
2	Italy	1	1	1	3
3	Portugal	0	0	1	1
Totals (3 entries)		3	3	3	9

=== Medalists ===
Event	Gold	Silver	Bronze
Men's doubles	Spain (ESP); Daniel Santigosa; David Gala	Spain (ESP); Alonso Rodríguez; Pablo García	Portugal (POR); Afonso Fazendeiro; Miguel Oliveira
Women's doubles	Italy (ITA); Carolina Orsi; Giorgia Marchetti	Spain (ESP); Marta Barrera; Marta Caparrós	Italy (ITA); Chiara Pappacena; Giulia Sussarello
Mixed doubles	Spain (ESP); Noa Cánovas; Daniel Santigosa	Italy (ITA); Marco Cassetta; Giulia Sussarello	Spain (ESP); Araceli María Martínez; David Gala

== Participating nations ==
Twenty-four nations sent padel tennis players to compete in the events.

- Albania (2)
- Austria (8)
- Azerbaijan (2)
- Belgium (2)
- Bulgaria (2)
- Czech Republic (4)
- Denmark (4)
- Estonia (4)
- Finland (4)
- France (8)
- Germany (6)
- Hungary (4)
- Ireland (4)
- Italy (8)
- Lithuania (4)
- Monaco (2)
- Netherlands (8)
- Norway (4)
- Poland (8)
- Portugal (8)
- San Marino (2)
- Spain (8)
- Sweden (8)
- Switzerland (6)
