= Pakistan at the 2024 Summer Olympics =

- IOC code: PAK
- NOC: National Olympic Committee of Pakistan
- Website: www.nocpakistan.org

in Paris, France 26 July 2024 – 11 August 2024
- Competitors: 7 (4 men and 3 women) in 3 sports
- Flag bearers (opening): Arshad Nadeem & Jehanara Nabi
- Flag bearer (closing): Faiqa Riaz
- Medals Ranked 62nd: Gold 1 Silver 0 Bronze 0 Total 1

Summer Olympics appearances (overview)
- 1948; 1952; 1956; 1960; 1964; 1968; 1972; 1976; 1980; 1984; 1988; 1992; 1996; 2000; 2004; 2008; 2012; 2016; 2020; 2024

Other related appearances
- India (1900–pres.); Bangladesh (1984–pres.)

Pakistan competed at the 2024 Summer Olympics in Paris from 26 July to 11 August 2024. It was the nation's nineteenth appearance at the Summer Olympics.

Javelin thrower Arshad Nadeem captured Pakistan's first Olympic medal since 1992 and first gold medal since 1984, as well as the country's first ever gold medal in an individual sport. Nadeem broke the 16-year-old Olympic record of 90.57 metres, recording a throw of 92.97 metres.

== Medalists ==
Medal	Name	Sport	Event	Date
Gold	Arshad Nadeem	Athletics	Men's javelin throw	8 August

Medals by sport
Sport	Gold	Silver	Bronze	Total
Athletics	1	0	0	1
Total	1	0	0	1

== Competitors ==
The following is the list of number of competitors in the Games.

In a first for Pakistan, Arshad Nadeem and the three shooters, Ghulam Mustafa Bashir, Gulfam Joseph and Kishmala Talat qualified for their respective events after reaching the qualifications marks, while the rest of the athletes, Faiqa Riaz, Muhammad Ahmed Durrani and Jehanara Nabi were given wild cards (universality places). This was also the most gender balanced contingent sent by Pakistan to the Olympic games.

Sport	Men	Women	Total
Athletics	1	1	2
Shooting	2	1	3
Swimming	1	1	2
Total	4	3	7

== Athletics ==
Pakistani track and field athletes achieved the entry standards for Paris 2024, either by passing the direct qualifying mark (or time for track and road races) or by world ranking, in the following events (a maximum of 3 athletes each):

Key

- Note–Ranks given for track events are within the athlete's heat only
- Q = Qualified for the next round
- q = Qualified for the next round as a fastest loser or, in field events, by position without achieving the qualifying target
- NR = National record
- N/A = Round not applicable for the event
- Bye = Athlete not required to compete in round

Track & road events

Athlete	Event	Preliminary Round		Heat		Semifinal		Final	
Athlete	Event	Result	Rank	Result	Rank	Result	Rank	Result	Rank
Faiqa Riaz	Women's 100 m	12.49 PB	24	Did not advance					

Field events

Athlete	Event	Qualification		Final	
Athlete	Event	Distance	Position	Distance	Position
Arshad Nadeem	Men's javelin throw	86.59 SB	4 Q	92.97 OR	1st place, gold medalist(s)

== Shooting ==
Pakistani shooters achieved quota places for the following events based on their results at the 2022 and 2023 ISSF World Championships, 2023 and 2024 Asian Championships, and 2024 ISSF World Olympic Qualification Tournament.

Athlete	Event	Qualification		Final	
Athlete	Event	Points	Rank	Points	Rank
Gulfam Joseph	Men's 10 m air pistol	571	22	Did not advance	
Ghulam Mustafa Bashir	Men's 25 m rapid fire pistol	581	15	Did not advance	
Kishmala Talat	Women's 10 m air pistol	567	31	Did not advance	
Kishmala Talat	Women's 25 m pistol	579	22	Did not advance	
Gulfam Joseph; Kishmala Talat	Mixed 10 m air pistol team	571	14	Did not advance	

== Swimming ==
Pakistan sent two swimmers to compete at the 2024 Paris Olympics. They were given wildcards.

Athlete	Event	Heat		Semifinal		Final	
Athlete	Event	Time	Rank	Time	Rank	Time	Rank
Muhammad Ahmed Durrani	Men's 200 m freestyle	1:58.67	25	Did not advance			
Jehanara Nabi	Women's 200 m freestyle	2:10.69	26	Did not advance			

== See also ==
- Pakistan at the 2024 Summer Paralympics
