= Duško Petrov =

Serbian sport shooter

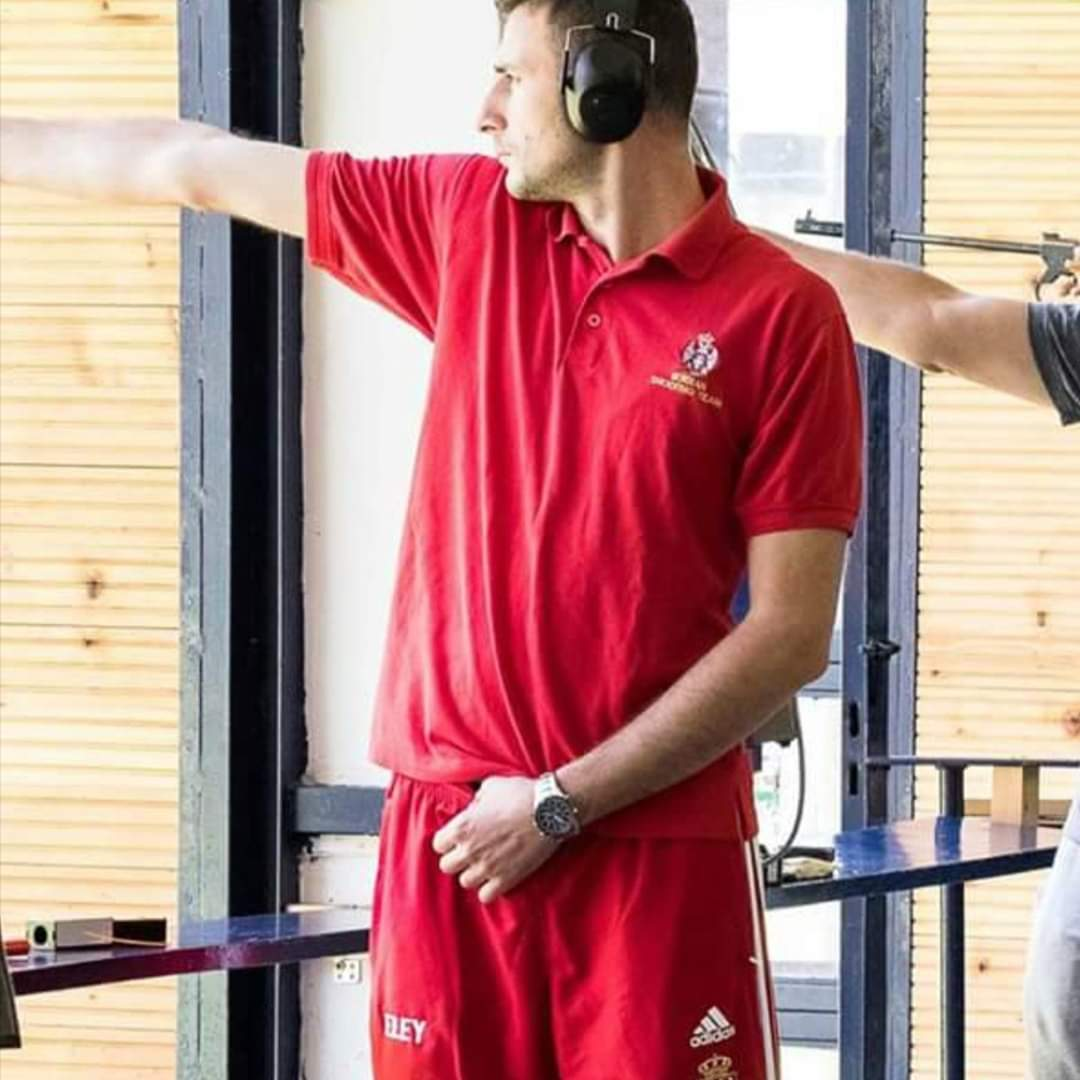
- Image of Duško Petrov

Personal information
- Nationality: Serbian
- Born: 13 May 1988 (age 38) Kikinda, SR Serbia, SFR Yugoslavia
- Height: 1.95 m (6 ft 5 in)
- Weight: 92 kg (203 lb)

Sport
- Country: Serbia
- Sport: Shooting
- Event: Air pistol
- Club: SK "Kikinda", Kikinda
Medal record
World Championships
| Silver medal – second place | 2018 Changwon | 50 m team pistol |

Duško Petrov (born 13 May 1988) is a Serbian sport shooter from Kikinda. As junior, Petrov was great talent with air pistol. Later, with his team (Damir Mikec and Dimitrije Grgic) won gold medal on european championship in Gabala (Azerbaijan) 2017. Petrov is also one of the best shooter in German Bundesliga and owner of Serbian national record with Free pistol 50m.

He participated at the 2018 ISSF World Shooting Championships.
