= Cho Yeong-jae =

South Korean sport shooter

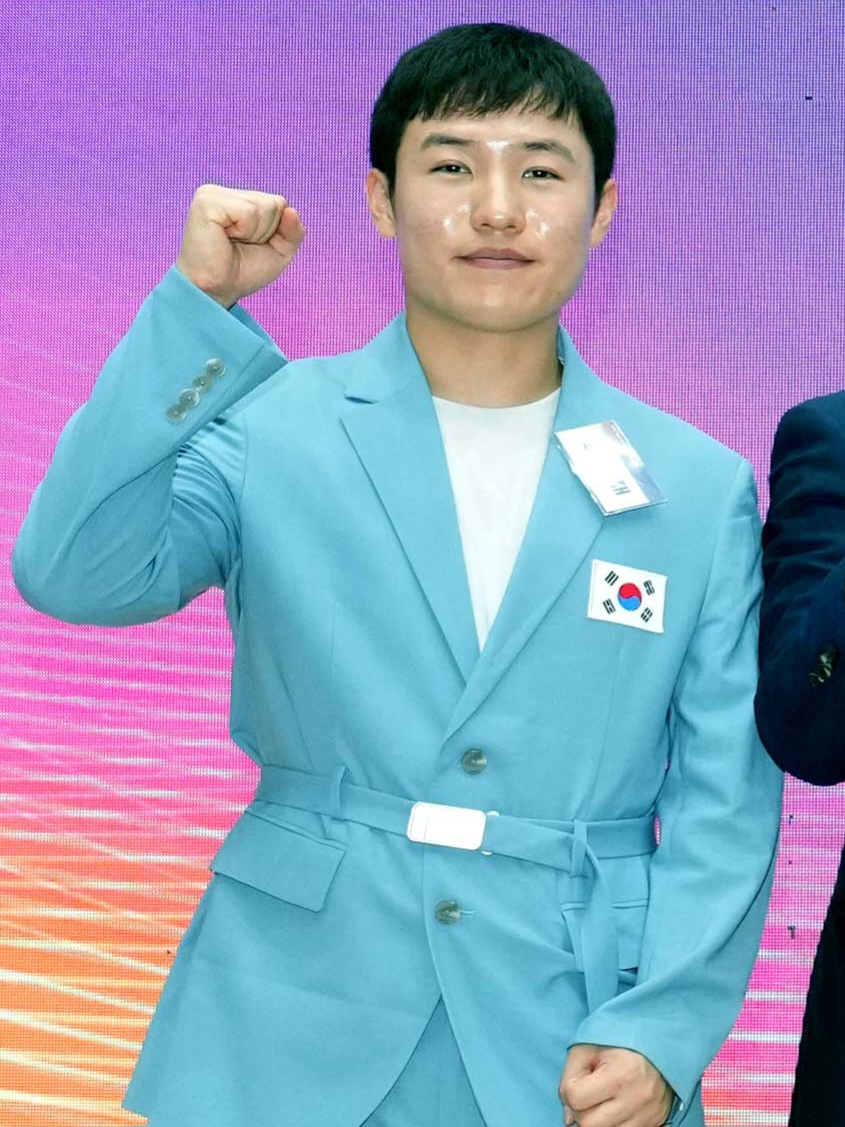
- Cho in 2024

Personal information
- Born: 15 January 1999 (age 27) Jangseong, South Korea

Sport
- Country: South Korea
- Sport: Sports shooting
Medal record
Men's shooting
Representing South Korea
Olympic Games
Silver medal – second place	2024 Paris	25 metre rapid fire pistol
World Championships
Gold medal – first place	2025 Cairo	25 m standard pistol team
Silver medal – second place	2025 Cairo	25 m standard pistol
Junior World Championships
Silver medal – second place	2017 Suhl	10m air pistol team
Silver medal – second place	2017 Suhl	25m pistol team
Bronze medal – third place	2017 Suhl	50m pistol team

Cho Yeong-jae (Korean: 조영재; born 15 January 1999) is a South Korean sport shooter. He competed at the 2024 Summer Olympics, winning the silver medal in the men's 25 metre rapid fire pistol event.
