= Robin Walter =

German sport shooter (born 1999)

Personal information
- Nationality: German
- Born: 9 July 1999 (age 27)

Sport
- Country: Germany
- Sport: Shooting
- Event: Air pistol
- Club: SGi Ebersbach; KKS Hambrücken
Medal record
Men's shooting
Representing Germany
World Championships
Bronze medal – third place	2025 Cairo	10 m air pistol team
European Games
Gold medal – first place	2023 Wrocław	10 m air pistol team
Bronze medal – third place	2023 Wrocław	10 m air pistol
European Championships
Gold medal – first place	2022 Hamar	10 m air pistol
Gold medal – first place	2022 Hamar	10 m air pistol team
Gold medal – first place	2024 Győr	10 m air pistol team
Silver medal – second place	2023 Tallinn	10 m air pistol team
Silver medal – second place	2026 Yerevan	10 m air pistol
Bronze medal – third place	2021 Osijek	10 m air pistol
Bronze medal – third place	2022 Hamar	10 m air pistol
Bronze medal – third place	2024 Győr	10 m air pistol
World Cup
Gold medal – first place	2022 Cairo	10 m air pistol team
Gold medal – first place	2022 Rio de Janeiro	10 m air pistol team
Gold medal – first place	2023 Doha	10 m air pistol
Silver medal – second place	2024 New Delhi	10 m air pistol
Bronze medal – third place	2022 Cairo	10 m air pistol mixed
Bronze medal – third place	2023 Cairo	10 m air pistol mixed
Bronze medal – third place	2023 Baku	10 m air pistol

Robin Walter (born 9 July 1999) is a German sport shooter. He is a three-time European champion with the air pistol.

== Professional career ==
Robin Walter got into shooting through his father. At the age of 18, he won the silver medal in the 10-meter pistol discipline at the 2017 Junior European Championships in Maribor. At the 2022 European Air Rifle Championships in Hamar, Norway, Walter became the most successful athlete on the German team: he won medals for the German national team in all three competitions: gold in the individual and mixed together with Sandra Reitz, as well as bronze with the men's team with Paul Fröhlich and David Probst. Walter won the individual final in the 10-meter air pistol discipline after a 17:15 final against Juraj Tužinský from Slovakia, fending off two “match points” from his opponent.

Walter became European champion again in 2024 when he won the 10-meter air pistol team competition at the European Championships in Győr together with his shooting colleagues Michael Schwald and Paul Fröhlich. Walter was the number one 10-meter air pistol shooter in the world in 2024.

At the 2024 Olympic Games in Paris, Walter entered the final with the air pistol in eighth place in the qualification, which he finished in sixth place. He finished ninth in the mixed competition with Doreen Vennekamp.
