= Federico Nilo Maldini =

Italian pistol shooter

Personal information
- Born: 28 March 2001 (age 25) Bologna, Italy

Sport
- Country: Italy
- Sport: Sports shooting
Medal record
Men's shooting
Representing Italy
Olympic Games
Silver medal – second place	2024 Paris	10 m air pistol
World Championships
Silver medal – second place	2025 Cairo	10 m air pistol team
European Games
Bronze medal – third place	2023 Kraków-Małopolska	10 m air pistol team
European Championships
Gold medal – first place	2019 Bologna	25 m pistol Junior team
Gold medal – first place	2026 Yerevan	10 m air pistol team
Silver medal – second place	2019 Bologna	25 m standard pistol Junior team
Silver medal – second place	2019 Bologna	25 m standard pistol Junior mixed team
Silver medal – second place	2025 Osijek	10 m air pistol team

Federico Nilo Maldini (born 28 March 2001) is an Italian sport shooter. He competed at the 2024 Summer Olympics, winning the silver medal in the men's 10 metre air pistol event.
