= Yuliya Korostylova =

Ukrainian sport shooter (born 1984)

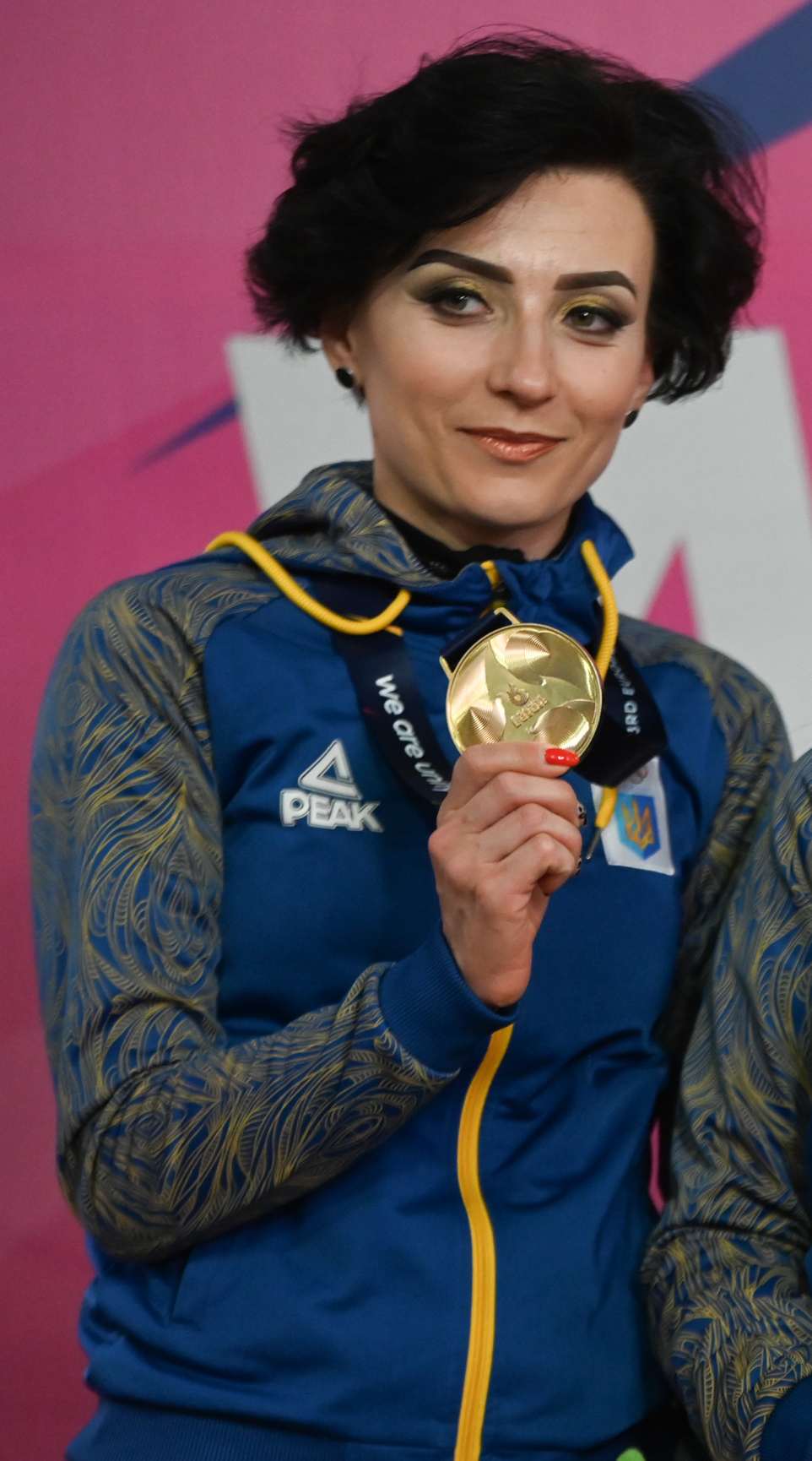
- Yuliya Korostylova at the 2023 European Games.

Personal information
- Full name: Yuliya Serhiïvna Korostylova
- Nationality: Ukraine
- Born: 8 February 1984 (age 42) Lviv, Ukrainian SSR, Soviet Union
- Height: 1.64 m (5 ft 4 1/2 in)
- Weight: 51 kg (112 lb)

Sport
- Sport: Shooting
- Event(s): 10 m air pistol (AP40); 25 m pistol (SP)
- Club: Army Sport Club Lviv
- Coached by: Valentina Korostylova; Serhiy Korostylov
Medal record
Women's shooting
Representing Ukraine
World Championships
| Gold medal – first place | 2022 Cairo | 25 m rapid fire pistol mixed team |
European Games
| Gold medal – first place | 2023 Kraków-Małopolska | 25 m pistol team |
| Gold medal – first place | 2023 Kraków-Małopolska | 25 m rapid fire pistol mixed team |
European Championships
| Gold medal – first place | 2021 Osijek | 10 m air pistol team |
| Gold medal – first place | 2021 Osijek | 25 m rapid fire pistol mixed team |
| Bronze medal – third place | 2022 Wrocław | 25 m rapid fire pistol mixed team |
Universiade
| Gold medal – first place | 2007 Banghkok | 10 m air pistol team |
| Bronze medal – third place | 2007 Banghkok | 25 m pistol team |
| Bronze medal – third place | 2011 Shenzhen | 10 m air pistol team |

Yuliya Serhiïvna Korostylova (Ukrainian: Юлія Сергіївна Корoстильова; born 8 February 1984 in Lviv) is a Ukrainian sport shooter.

== Career ==
She represented her nation Ukraine in pistol shooting at the 2004 Summer Olympics, and trained throughout her sporting career for the shooting team at Lviv Sports Club Academy under her coaching parents Valentina and Serhiy Korostylov. Coming from a sporting pedigree, Korostylova shares the same discipline with her younger brother Pavlo Korostylov, who later held the junior world record and won a gold medal in air pistol at the 2014 Summer Youth Olympics in Nanjing, China.

Korostylova qualified for the Ukrainian squad in pistol shooting at the 2004 Summer Olympics in Athens, by virtue of exchanging quota places won by Germany in the rifle three positions with her spot in the air pistol, having achieved a mandatory Olympic standard of 381. Korostylova started off her run by firing a score of 382 points to secure the tenth position in the women's 10 m air pistol prelims, tying her with four other shooters including 1988 Olympic bronze medalist Nino Salukvadze of neighboring Georgia. In her second event, the 25 m pistol, Korostylova came strong from her immediate failure in the air pistol to edge out her teammate and Olympic champion Olena Kostevych by a single point with a score of 570, but ended up only in twenty-sixth out of thirty-seven shooters in the prelims.
