= Paolo Monna =

Italian pistol shooter

Personal information
- Born: 19 April 1998 (age 28) Fasano, Italy

Sport
- Country: Italy
- Sport: Sports shooting
- Club: C.S. Carabinieri
Medal record
Men's Shooting
Representing Italy
Olympic Games
Bronze medal – third place	2024 Paris	10 m air pistol
World Championships
Silver medal – second place	2025 Cairo	10 m air pistol team
European Games
Gold medal – first place	2023 Kraków-Małopolska	10 m air pistol mixed team
Bronze medal – third place	2023 Kraków-Małopolska	10 m air pistol team
European Championships
Gold medal – first place	2024 Győr	10 m air pistol
Gold medal – first place	2026 Yerevan	10 m air pistol team
Silver medal – second place	2025 Osijek	10 m air pistol team

Paolo Monna (born 19 April 1998) is an Italian pistol shooter. He competed in the men's 10 metre air pistol event at the 2020 Summer Olympics. He won the bronze medal in the men's 10 metre air pistol event at the 2024 Summer Olympics.

== Biography ==
Monna was born in Fasano.
