= Maksym Horodynets =

Ukrainian sport shooter

Personal information
- Nationality: Ukraine
- Born: 11 October 1998 (age 28) Horishni Plavni, Ukraine
- Height: 1.75 m (5 ft 9 in)
- Weight: 69 kg (152 lb)

Sport
- Country: Ukraine
- Sport: Shooting
- Events: AP60, RFPM, RFP, STP, SPM, FP, RFPMIX, APTEAMM, RFPTEAMM
Medal record
Men's shooting
Representing Ukraine
World Championships
| Gold medal – first place | 2022 Cairo | 25m rapid fire pistol mixed team |
| Gold medal – first place | 2026 Doha | 25 m centre fire pistol team |
| Bronze medal – third place | 2025 Cairo | 25 m rapid fire pistol |
| Bronze medal – third place | 2026 Doha | 25 m standard pistol team |
European Championships
| Gold medal – first place | 2025 Châteauroux | 25 m standard pistol team |
| Gold medal – first place | 2025 Châteauroux | 25 m center fire pistol team |
European Junior Championships
| Silver medal – second place | 2017 Baku | 25 m rapid fire pistol |
| Bronze medal – third place | 2016 Tallinn | 25 m rapid fire pistol |

Maksym Horodynets (Ukrainian: Максим Городинець, born 11 October 1998) is a Ukrainian male sport shooter. He competes in pistol competitions.

== Career ==
Horodynets is a two-time European junior bronze medallist. During the 2022 season, Horodynets achieved a bronze podium rank in 25 metre rapid fire pistol mixed team event together with Anastasiia Nimets. Later in 2022, Horodynets and Yulia Korostylova became World champions in the 25 meters rapid fire pistol mixed team event.
