= Clément Bessaguet =

French sport shooter (born 1991)

Personal information
- Nationality: French
- Born: 29 May 1991 (age 35) Montpellier, France
- Height: 1.81 m (5 ft 11 in)
- Weight: 68 kg (150 lb)

Sport
- Country: France
- Sport: Shooting
- Event: Air pistol
- Club: Societe de tir de Montpellier
Medal record
Men's shooting
Representing France
World Championships
Gold medal – first place	2018 Changwon	25 m standard pistol team
Gold medal – first place	2025 Cairo	25 m rapid fire pistol
Gold medal – first place	2026 Doha	25 m rapid fire pistol team
Silver medal – second place	2018 Changwon	25 m center fire pistol team
Silver medal – second place	2022 Cairo	25 m rapid fire pistol
Silver medal – second place	2023 Baku	25 m rapid fire pistol
Silver medal – second place	2026 Doha	25 m rapid fire pistol
European Games
Gold medal – first place	2023 Kraków-Małopolska	25 m rapid fire pistol
Gold medal – first place	2023 Kraków-Małopolska	25 m rapid fire pistol team
Bronze medal – third place	2019 Minsk	25 m rapid fire pistol
European Championships
Gold medal – first place	2019 Bologna	25 m rapid fire pistol team
Gold medal – first place	2021 Osijek	25 m rapid fire pistol team
Gold medal – first place	2022 Wrocław	25 m rapid fire pistol
Gold medal – first place	2022 Wrocław	25 m rapid fire pistol team
Gold medal – first place	2025 Châteauroux	25 m Rapid Fire Pistol Team
Silver medal – second place	2015 Maribor	25 m standard pistol team
Silver medal – second place	2017 Baku	25 m standard pistol team
Silver medal – second place	2025 Châteauroux	25 m Rapid Fire Pistol
Bronze medal – third place	2015 Maribor	25 m rapid fire pistol team
Bronze medal – third place	2017 Baku	25 m center fire pistol team
Bronze medal – third place	2019 Bologna	25 m center fire pistol team
Bronze medal – third place	2021 Osijek	25 m rapid fire pistol
Summer Universiade
Bronze medal – third place	2013 Kazan,	25 m standard pistol

Clément Bessaguet (born 29 May 1991) is a French sport shooter.

He participated at the 2018 ISSF World Shooting Championships, winning a medal.
