= Jean Quiquampoix =

French sports shooter (born 1995)

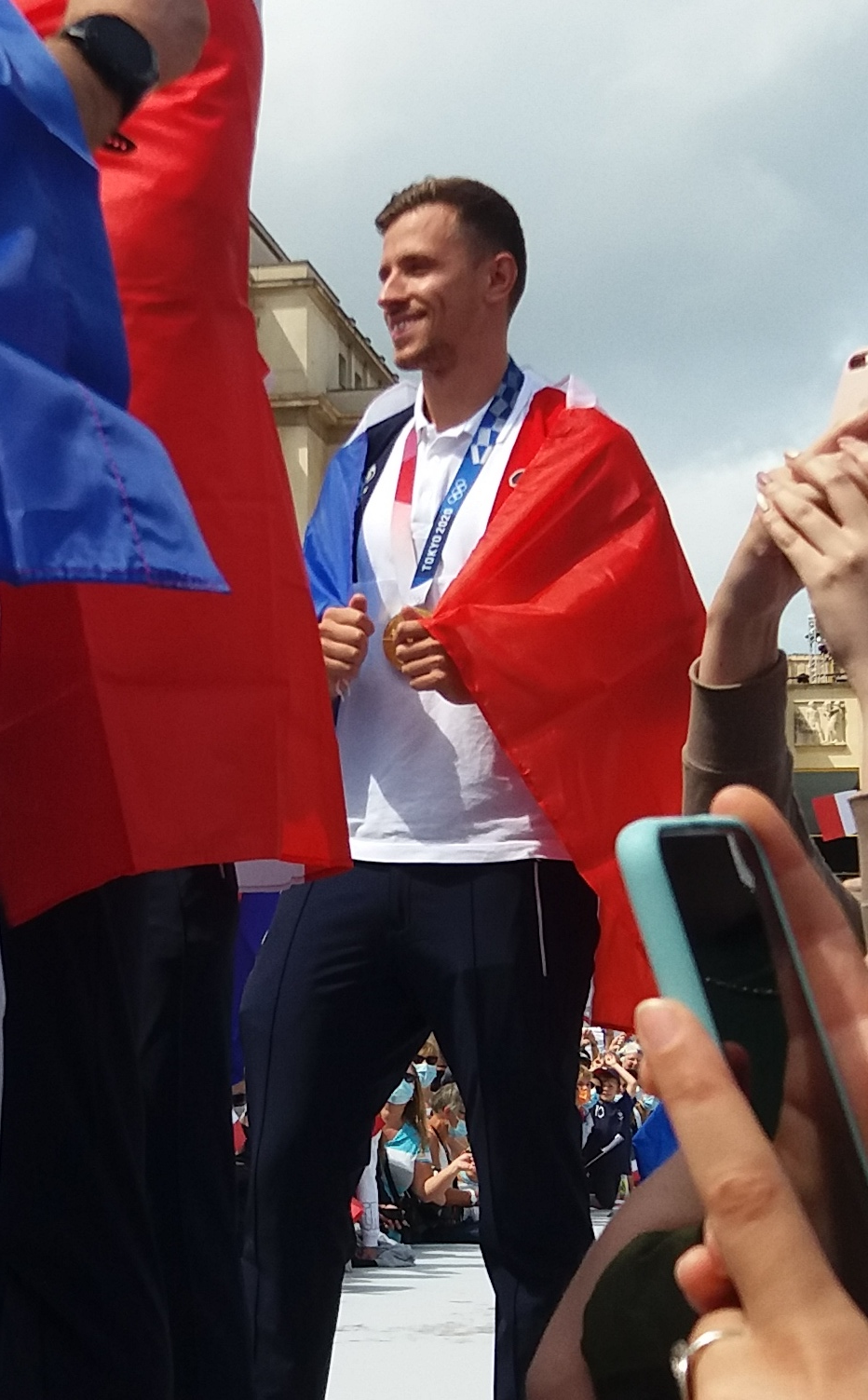
- Quiquampoix in 2021

Personal information
- Born: 3 November 1995 (age 31) Paris, France
- Height: 1.89 m (6 ft 2 in)
- Weight: 90 kg (198 lb)

Sport
- Country: France
- Sport: Shooting
- Event: Air pistol
- Club: TS Antibes
Medal record
Men's shooting
Representing France
Olympic Games
Gold medal – first place	2020 Tokyo	25 m rapid fire pistol
Silver medal – second place	2016 Rio de Janeiro	25 m rapid fire pistol
World Championships
Gold medal – first place	2026 Doha	25 m rapid fire pistol team
Bronze medal – third place	2018 Changwon	25 m rapid fire pistol
Bronze medal – third place	2026 Doha	25 m rapid fire pistol
European Games
Gold medal – first place	2023 Kraków-Małopolska	25 m rapid fire pistol team
Silver medal – second place	2019 Minsk	25 m rapid fire pistol
European Championships
Gold medal – first place	2019 Bologna	25 m rapid fire pistol team
Gold medal – first place	2021 Osijek	25 m rapid fire pistol
Gold medal – first place	2021 Osijek	25 m rapid fire pistol team
Gold medal – first place	2022 Wrocław	25 m rapid fire pistol team
Gold medal – first place	2025 Châteauroux	25 m Rapid Fire Pistol Team
Bronze medal – third place	2025 Châteauroux	25 m Rapid Fire Pistol

Jean Quiquampoix (born 3 November 1995) is a French sports shooter. He competed in the men's 25 metre rapid fire pistol event at the 2020 Summer Olympics where he won the gold medal. He also competed in the men's 25 metre rapid fire pistol event at the 2016 Summer Olympics where he won the silver medal.
