= National Shooting Center =

Firing range in Rio de Janeiro, Brazil

Coordinates: 22.8589°S 43.4112°W

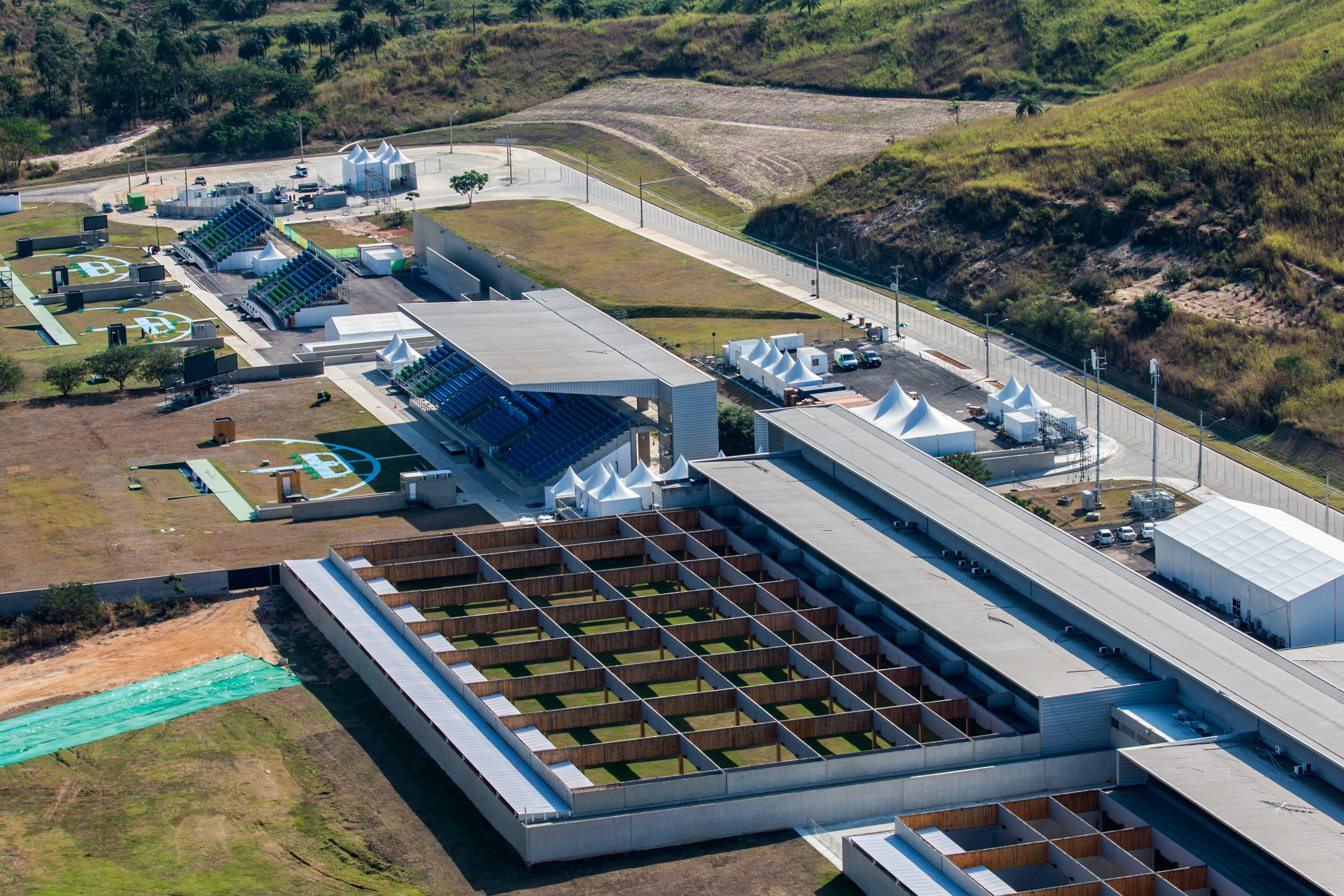
National Shooting Center

The National Shooting Center, known as the Olympic Shooting Centre during the 2016 Summer Olympics, is a firing range in Deodoro, Rio de Janeiro, Brazil. The range was opened in 2007 and was upgraded to host the sports shooting events for the 2016 Summer Olympics and the 2016 Summer Paralympics.
