= Martin Podhráský =

Czech sport shooter (born 1983)

Personal information
- Nationality: Czech Republic
- Born: 11 October 1983 (age 42) Prague, Czechoslovakia
- Height: 1.92 m (6 ft 3 1/2 in)
- Weight: 85 kg (187 lb)

Sport
- Sport: Shooting
- Event: 25 m rapid fire pistol (RFP)
- Club: ŠKP Rapid Plzeň
- Coached by: Vaclav Sasek
Medal record
World Championships
Silver medal – second place	2014 Granada	25 m rapid fire pistol team
European Games
Silver medal – second place	2023 Kraków-Małopolska	25 m rapid fire pistol team
Bronze medal – third place	2023 Kraków-Małopolska	25 m rapid fire pistol
European Championships
Bronze medal – third place	2021 Osijek	25 m rapid fire pistol team
Bronze medal – third place	2022 Wrocław	25 m rapid fire pistol team

Martin Podhráský (born 11 October 1983) is a Czech sport shooter and physician. He won two gold medals, and eventually set a new world record of 583 points in the men's rapid fire pistol (RFP) at the 2011 ISSF World Cup series in Sydney, Australia, and in Changwon, South Korea.

Podhrasky represented the Czech Republic at the 2008 Summer Olympics in Beijing, where he competed in the men's 25 m rapid fire pistol, along with his teammate Martin Strnad. He placed fourteenth out of nineteen shooters in the qualifying rounds of the event, with a total score of 565 points (276 on the first stage and 289 on the second).

At the 2012 Summer Olympics in London, Podhrasky finished only in seventh place, and thereby missed out of the final round in the men's 25 m rapid fire pistol by one point behind Germany's Christian Reitz from the second stage, for a total score of 583 targets.
