= Martin Strnad =

Czech sport shooter (born 1974)

Personal information
- Nationality: Czech Republic
- Born: 1 August 1974 (age 52) Brno, Czechoslovakia
- Height: 1.82 m (5 ft 11 1/2 in)
- Weight: 83 kg (183 lb)

Sport
- Sport: Shooting
- Event: 25 m rapid fire pistol (RFP)
- Club: ŠKP Rapid Plzeň
- Coached by: Bratislav Putna
Medal record
Men's shooting
Representing Czech Republic
European Games
Silver medal – second place	2023 Kraków-Małopolska	25 m rapid fire pistol team

Martin Strnad (born 1 August 1974 in Brno) is a Czech sport shooter. He won a silver medal in the men's rapid fire pistol at the 2009 ISSF World Cup series in Munich, Germany, with a total score of 780.2 points. He won a gold medal in the men's rapid fire pistol at the 2013 ISSF World Cup series in Bangkok, Thailand.

Strnad represented the Czech Republic at the 2008 Summer Olympics in Beijing, where he competed in the men's 25 m rapid fire pistol, along with his teammate Martin Podhráský. He placed sixteenth out of nineteen shooters in the qualifying rounds of the event, with a total score of 562 points (267 on the first stage, and 295 on the second).

At the 2012 Summer Olympics in London, Strnad improved his performance from the previous games by hitting a total of 580 targets (287 on the first stage and 293 on the second) in the men's 25 m rapid fire pistol, finishing only in ninth place by two points behind Russia's Leonid Ekimov.
