= Massimo Spinella =

Italian sport shooter

Personal information
- Born: 8 August 1999 (age 26) Reggio Calabria, Italy

Sport
- Country: Italy
- Sport: Sports shooting
Medal record
Men's shooting
Representing Italy
European Games
Bronze medal – third place	2023 Kraków-Małopolska	Team 10 metre air pistol
Bronze medal – third place	2023 Kraków-Małopolska	Team 25 metre rapid fire pistol
European Championships
Gold medal – first place	2019 Bologna	25m pistol Junior team
Silver medal – second place	2019 Bologna	25m pistol standard pistol Junior team
Silver medal – second place	2019 Bologna	50m pistol Junior

Massimo Spinella (born 8 August 1999) is an Italian sport shooter. He competed in the men's 25 metre rapid fire pistol event at the 2024 Summer Olympics.
