= Oliver Geis =

German sport shooter (born 1991)

Personal information
- Born: 20 June 1991 (age 35) Limburg, Germany
- Height: 1.79 m (5 ft 10 in)
- Weight: 81 kg (179 lb)

Sport
- Country: Germany
- Sport: Shooting
- Event: Air pistol
- Club: SV Kriftel
Medal record
Men's shooting
Representing Germany
World Championships
Gold medal – first place	2014 Granada	25 m rapid fire pistol team
Gold medal – first place	2023 Baku	25 m center fire pistol team
Gold medal – first place	2025 Cairo	25 m rapid fire pistol team
Silver medal – second place	2014 Granada	25 m rapid fire pistol
Silver medal – second place	2018 Changwon	25 m rapid fire pistol team
Silver medal – second place	2023 Baku	25 m rapid fire pistol team
Silver medal – second place	2023 Baku	25 m standard pistol team
Silver medal – second place	2026 Doha	25 m rapid fire pistol
European Games
Gold medal – first place	2019 Minsk	25 m rapid fire pistol
Gold medal – first place	2019 Minsk	25 m standard pistol mixed team
Bronze medal – third place	2015 Baku	25 m rapid fire pistol
European Championships
Gold medal – first place	2013 Osijek	25 m rapid fire pistol team
Gold medal – first place	2015 Maribor	25 m rapid fire pistol
Gold medal – first place	2015 Maribor	25 m rapid fire pistol team
Gold medal – first place	2017 Baku	25 m rapid fire pistol team
Gold medal – first place	2026 Osijek	25 m rapid fire pistol team
Silver medal – second place	2019 Bologna	25 m rapid fire pistol team
Silver medal – second place	2019 Bologna	25 m center fire pistol team
Silver medal – second place	2022 Wrocław	25 m rapid fire pistol
Bronze medal – third place	2019 Bologna	25 m standard pistol team

Oliver Geis (born 20 June 1991) is a German shooter. He represented his country at the 2016 Summer Olympics.
