= Christian Reitz =

German sport shooter (born 1987)

Personal information
- Nationality: German
- Born: 29 April 1987 (age 39) Löbau, East Germany
- Height: 1.85 m (6 ft 1 in)
- Weight: 85 kg (187 lb)

Sport
- Country: Germany
- Sport: Shooting
- Event: Air pistol
- Club: SV Kriftel
Medal record
Men's shooting
Representing Germany
Olympic Games
Gold medal – first place	2016 Rio de Janeiro	25 m rapid fire pistol
Bronze medal – third place	2008 Beijing	25 m rapid fire pistol
World Championships
Gold medal – first place	2022 Cairo	25 m standard pistol mixed team
Gold medal – first place	2022 Cairo	25 m center fire pistol
Gold medal – first place	2023 Baku	25 m center fire pistol
Gold medal – first place	2023 Baku	25 m center fire pistol team
Silver medal – second place	2018 Changwon	25 m center fire pistol
Silver medal – second place	2018 Changwon	25 m team rapid fire pistol
Silver medal – second place	2022 Cairo	25 m standard pistol
Silver medal – second place	2023 Baku	25 m rapid fire pistol team
Silver medal – second place	2023 Baku	25 m standard pistol team
Bronze medal – third place	2025 Cairo	10 m air pistol team
European Games
Gold medal – first place	2015 Baku	25 m rapid fire pistol
Gold medal – first place	2015 Baku	10 m air pistol mixed team
Gold medal – first place	2023 Kraków-Małopolska	10 m air pistol team
Silver medal – second place	2019 Minsk	25 m standard pistol mixed team
Silver medal – second place	2023 Kraków-Małopolska	25 m rapid fire pistol
Bronze medal – third place	2019 Minsk	10 m air pistol mixed team
European Championships
Gold medal – first place	2013 Osijek	25 m RF pistol team
Silver medal – second place	2013 Osijek	25 m center fire pistol
Silver medal – second place	2025 Châteauroux	25 m Rapid Fire Pistol Team
Bronze medal – third place	2013 Osijek	25 m rapid fire pistol

Christian Reitz (born 29 April 1987) is a German 25 metre rapid fire pistol shooter, the current world record holder.

== Career ==
He rose to fame during 2005, the first year with the new equipment rules, but was defeated in that year's European Junior Championships by teammate Philipp Wagenitz before finishing his junior career with victories in the 2006 ISSF World Shooting Championships and the 2007 European Championships.

In his first year as a senior, Reitz won two World Cup competitions and was the runner-up behind three-time Olympic champion Ralf Schumann at another, equalling the world record with a 591 score in Milan, and raising Schumann's final world record from 790.0 to 794.0. At the 2008 Olympics, he won the bronze medal behind Oleksandr Petriv and Schumann.

== Performance timeline ==
=== 25 metre rapid fire pistol ===
	2008	2009
Olympic Games	(bronze) Bronze; 579+200.3	Not held
World Championships	Not held	
European Championships	Not held	
World Cup 1	(gold) Gold; 588+197.6	4th 589+195.4
World Cup 2	—	—
World Cup 3	(silver) Silver; 585+201.4	(gold) Gold; 584+201.3
World Cup 4	(gold) Gold; 591+203.0	(bronze) Bronze; 582+198.0
World Cup Final	(silver) Silver; 590+197.9	Qualified

== Records ==
Current world records held in 25 metre rapid fire pistol
Men	Qualification	593	Christian Reitz (GER); Kim Jun-hong (KOR)	July 30, 2013; July 6, 2014	Osijek (CRO); Beijing (CHN)
