= Peeter Olesk (sport shooter) =

Estonian sport shooter (born 1993)

Personal information
- Nationality: Estonian
- Born: 22 April 1993 (age 33) Põlva, Estonia
- Height: 1.79 m (5 ft 10 in)
- Weight: 70 kg (154 lb)

Sport
- Country: Estonia
- Sport: Shooting
- Event: Air pistol
Medal record
Men's shooting
Representing Estonia
World Championships
Silver medal – second place	2023 Baku	25 m center fire pistol
Bronze medal – third place	2022 Cairo	25 m center fire pistol
European Championships
Gold medal – first place	2021 Osijek	25 m center fire pistol
Silver medal – second place	2017 Baku	25 m rapid fire pistol
Silver medal – second place	2025 Châteauroux	25 m Center Fire Pistol Team
Bronze medal – third place	2017 Baku	25 m center fire pistol
Bronze medal – third place	2022 Wrocław	25 m center fire pistol
European Junior Championships
Gold medal – first place	2013 Osijek	25 m standard pistol
Silver medal – second place	2013 Osijek	25 m standard pistol team
Bronze medal – third place	2013 Osijek	25 m rapid fire pistol
World Cup
Gold medal – first place	2021 New Delhi	25 m rapid fire pistol

Peeter Olesk (born 22 April 1993, in Põlva) is an Estonian sport shooter. In 2013 he won a gold in the 25m Standard Pistol, at the European Shooting Championships. He has also won the Estonian junior championship in shooting 13 times.

He competed at the 2016 Summer Olympics.

He has qualified for the 2020 Summer Olympics.

In 2022, Olesk won a bronze medal at the ISSF World Pistol / Rifle Championships in the ISSF 25 meter pistol event in Cairo.
