= Ruslan Lunev =

Azerbaijani sports shooter (born 1989)

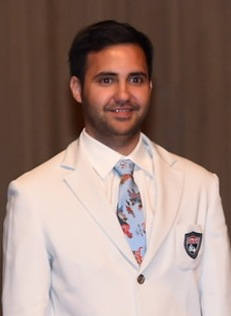
- Lunev in 2016

Personal information
- Born: 25 July 1989 (age 36) Baku, Azerbaijan

Sport
- Sport: Sports shooting
Medal record
Men's shooting
Representing Azerbaijan
Islamic Solidarity Games
Gold medal – first place	2017 Baku	10 m air pistol
Gold medal – first place	2017 Baku	25 m center fire pistol
Gold medal – first place	2017 Baku	25 m rapid fire pistol
Gold medal – first place	2017 Baku	25 m standard pistol
Gold medal – first place	2017 Baku	10 m air pistol mixed team
European Championships
Gold medal – first place	2019 Bologna	25 m center fire pistol
Gold medal – first place	2022 Wrocław	25 m standard pistol
Silver medal – second place	2022 Wrocław	25 m center fire pistol
Silver medal – second place	2025 Châteauroux	25 m Center Fire Pistol
Bronze medal – third place	2017 Maribor	10 m pistol mixed team
Bronze medal – third place	2021 Osijek	25 m center fire pistol

Ruslan Vladimirovich Lunev (Azerbaijani: Ruslan Lunyov, born 25 July 1989) is an Azerbaijani sports shooter. He is the son of Azerbaijani Olympic bronze medalist sports shooter Irada Ashumova and her husband and coach Vladimir Lunev. He competed in the men's 10 metre air pistol event at the 2016 Summer Olympics.

He qualified to represent Azerbaijan at the 2020 Summer Olympics in the men's 25 metre rapid fire pistol event.
