= Riccardo Mazzetti =

Italian sport shooter (born 1984)

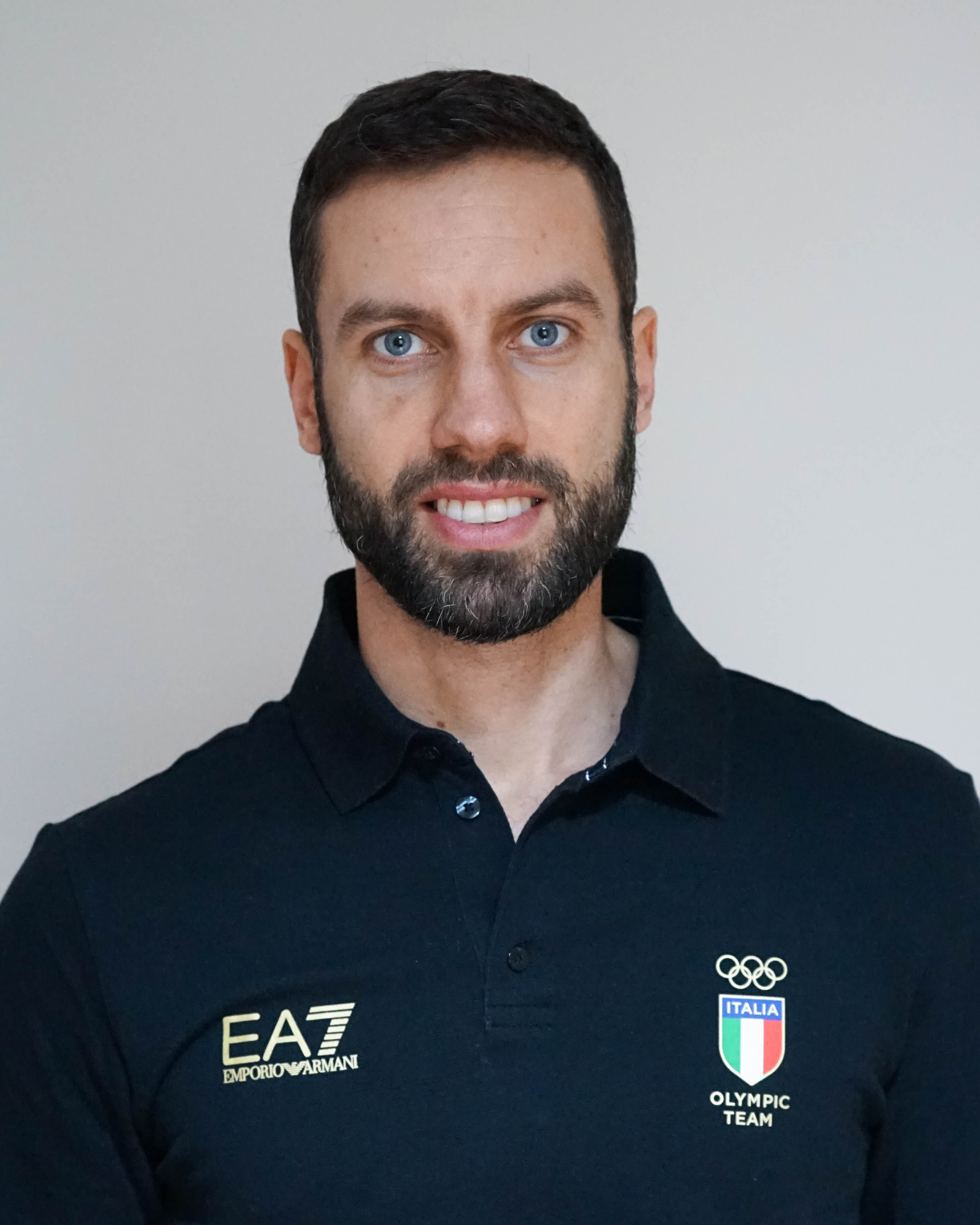
- Portrait of Riccardo Mazzetti

Personal information
- Nationality: Italian
- Born: 2 May 1984 (age 42)
- Height: 1.81 m (5 ft 11 in)
- Weight: 77 kg (170 lb)

Sport
- Country: Italy
- Sport: Shooting
Medal record
Men's shooting
Representing Italy
European Games
Bronze medal – third place	2023 Kraków-Małopolska	25 m rapid fire pistol team

Riccardo Mazzetti (born 2 May 1984) is an Italian shooter. He represented his country at the 2016 Summer Olympics.
