= Pavlo Korostylov =

Ukrainian sport shooter (born 1997)

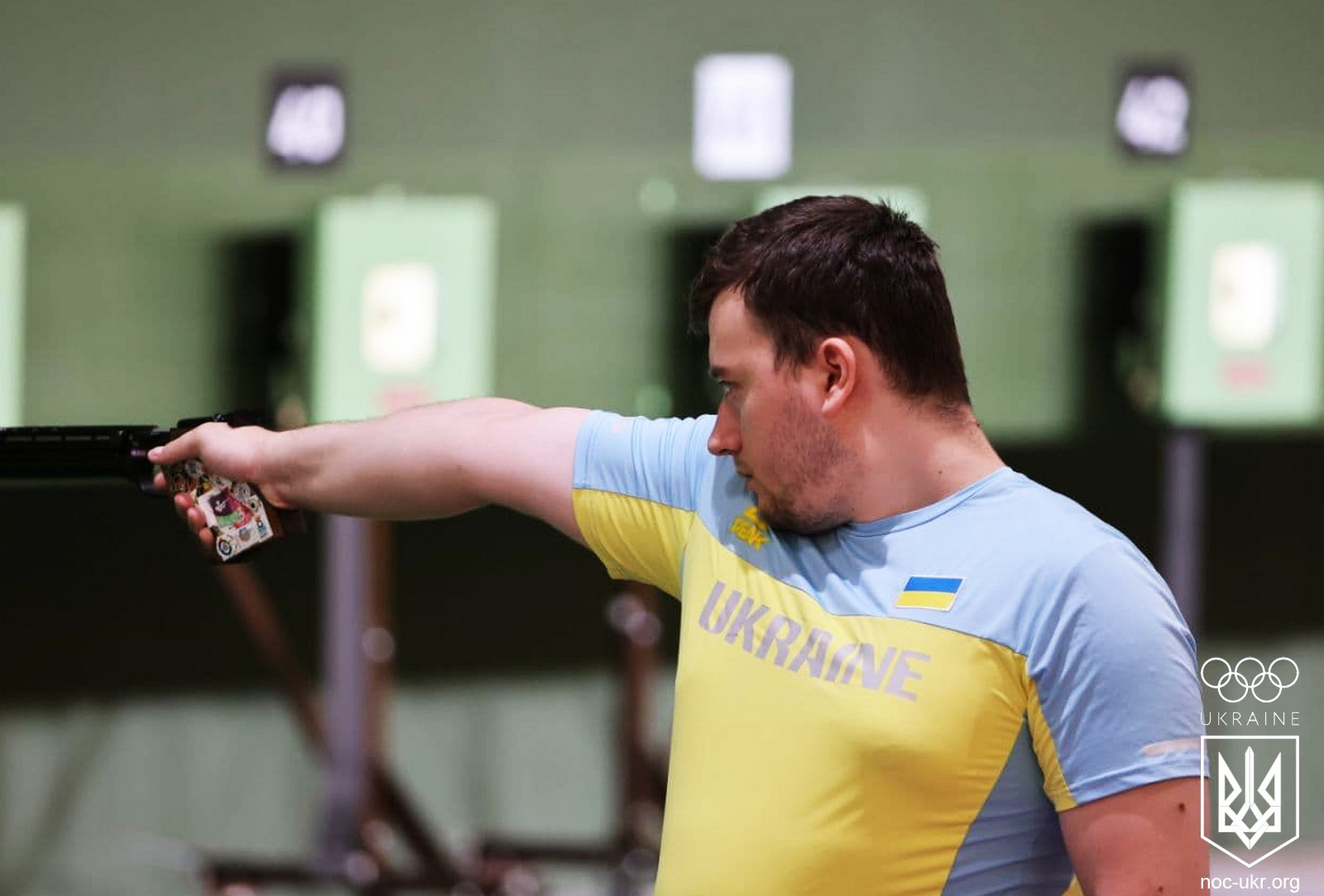
- Pavlo Korostylov at the 2020 Summer Olympics

Personal information
- Full name: Pavlo Serhiyovych Korostylov
- Nationality: Ukrainian
- Born: 5 November 1997 (age 29) Lviv, Ukraine
- Height: 1.86 m (6 ft 1 in)
- Weight: 85 kg (187 lb)

Sport
- Country: Ukraine
- Sport: Shooting
- Events: 10 m air pistol (AP60); 50 m pistol (FP)
- Club: Educational – Sports Base of Summer Sports Events
- Coached by: Valentina Korostylova; Serhiy Korostylov
Medal record
Men's shooting
Representing Ukraine
| Event | 1st | 2nd | 3rd |
|---|---|---|---|
| World Championships | 6 | 2 | 7 |
| European Games | 1 | 0 | 1 |
| European Championships | 9 | 9 | 5 |
| Military Games | 1 | 1 | 1 |
| Summer Youth Olympics | 1 | 0 | 0 |
World Championships
| Gold medal – first place | 2014 Granada | 25 m center fire pistol team |
| Gold medal – first place | 2014 Granada | 25 m standard pistol team |
| Gold medal – first place | 2018 Changwon | 25 m standard pistol |
| Gold medal – first place | 2022 Cairo | 25 m standard pistol |
| Gold medal – first place | 2025 Cairo | 25 m center fire pistol |
| Gold medal – first place | 2026 Doha | 25 m centre fire pistol team |
| Silver medal – second place | 2025 Cairo | 25 m center fire pistol team |
| Silver medal – second place | 2026 Doha | 25 m standard pistol |
| Bronze medal – third place | 2018 Changwon | 25 m center fire pistol |
| Bronze medal – third place | 2018 Changwon | 25 m standard pistol team |
| Bronze medal – third place | 2022 Cairo | 10 m air pistol |
| Bronze medal – third place | 2022 Cairo | 25 m standard pistol mixed team |
| Bronze medal – third place | 2025 Cairo | 25 m standard pistol |
| Bronze medal – third place | 2025 Cairo | 50 m meter pistol team |
| Bronze medal – third place | 2026 Doha | 25 m standard pistol team |
European Games
| Gold medal – first place | 2023 Kraków-Małopolska | 25 m rapid fire pistol mixed team |
| Bronze medal – third place | 2019 Minsk | 25 m pistol mixed team |
European Championships
| Gold medal – first place | 2017 Baku | 25 m pistol |
| Gold medal – first place | 2017 Baku | 25 m pistol team |
| Gold medal – first place | 2017 Baku | 25 m center fire pistol team |
| Gold medal – first place | 2017 Baku | 50 m pistol |
| Gold medal – first place | 2018 Győr | 10 m pistol team |
| Gold medal – first place | 2019 Osijek | 10 m pistol |
| Gold medal – first place | 2019 Bologna | 25 m standard pistol |
| Gold medal – first place | 2019 Bologna | 25 m center fire pistol team |
| Gold medal – first place | 2019 Bologna | 50 m pistol team |
| Gold medal – first place | 2025 Châteauroux | 25 m Standard Pistol Team |
| Gold medal – first place | 2025 Châteauroux | 25 m Center Fire Pistol |
| Gold medal – first place | 2025 Châteauroux | 25 m Center Fire Pistol Team |
| Gold medal – first place | 2025 Châteauroux | 50 m Pistol Team |
| Silver medal – second place | 2017 Maribor | 10 m pistol team |
| Silver medal – second place | 2017 Baku | 50 m pistol team |
| Silver medal – second place | 2019 Osijek | 10 m pistol team |
| Silver medal – second place | 2019 Bologna | 25 m standard pistol team |
| Silver medal – second place | 2019 Bologna | 25 m center fire pistol |
| Silver medal – second place | 2019 Bologna | 25 m standard pistol mixed team |
| Silver medal – second place | 2019 Bologna | 50 m pistol mixed team |
| Silver medal – second place | 2022 Wrocław | 25 m standard pistol open |
| Silver medal – second place | 2024 Győr | 10 m air pistol team |
| Silver medal – second place | 2025 Châteauroux | 25 m Standard Pistol |
| Bronze medal – third place | 2016 Győr | 10 m pistol |
| Bronze medal – third place | 2017 Baku | 25 m rapid fire pistol team |
| Bronze medal – third place | 2019 Bologna | 25 m rapid fire pistol team |
| Bronze medal – third place | 2022 Wrocław | 25 m rapid fire pistol |
| Bronze medal – third place | 2022 Wrocław | 25 m rapid fire pistol mixed team |
| Bronze medal – third place | 2025 Osijek | 10 m air pistol team |
| Bronze medal – third place | 2026 Osijek | 25 m Standard Pistol |
Military Games
| Gold medal – first place | 2019 Wuhan | 25 m centre fire pistol individual |
| Silver medal – second place | 2019 Wuhan | 25 m rapid fire pistol individual |
| Bronze medal – third place | 2019 Wuhan | 25 m center fire pistol team |
Summer Youth Olympics
| Gold medal – first place | 2014 Nanjing | AP60 |

Pavlo Serhiyovych Korostylov (Ukrainian: Павло Сергійович Корoстильов; born 5 November 1997) is a Ukrainian sport shooter. He is the 2016 European 10 m pistol bronze medalist.

== Career ==
He is a two-time European junior champion (2012 and 2013) and a gold medalist in the boys' 10 m air pistol at the 2014 Youth Olympic Games in Nanjing, China. Korostylov currently trains for the shooting team at Lviv Sports Club Academy, under his coaching parents Valentina and Serhiy Korostylov. Coming from a sporting pedigree, Korostylov also shares the same discipline with his older sister Yuliya Korostylova, who competed in pistol shooting for Ukraine at the 2004 Summer Olympics in Athens.

Korostylov flourished his early sporting success at the 2014 Summer Youth Olympics in Nanjing, China, where he fired a final junior world record at 203.4 to secure a gold medal victory in the boys' 10 m air pistol, surpassing then 14-year-old South Korean shooter Kim Cheong-yong by a solid 3.6-point lead.

On his senior debut at the inaugural 2015 European Games in Baku, Azerbaijan, Korostylov finished fifth in the men's 10 m air pistol final with an astonishing score of 138.2, beating his teammate Oleh Omelchuk by more than twenty-two points. With four other shooters ahead of him having already filled their Olympic quotas in the previous qualification tournaments, Korostylov was guaranteed a place on the Ukrainian squad, and competed for Ukraine at the 2016 Summer Olympics in Rio de Janeiro, finishing in qualifying in 35th place, missing the final round.
