= Poland at the European Games =

- IOC code: POL
- NOC: Polish Olympic Committee
- Website: www.olimpijski.pl
- Medals Ranked 12th: Gold 18 Silver 28 Bronze 38 Total 84

European Games appearances (overview)
- 2015; 2019; 2023; 2027

Poland participated at the European Games since the inaugural edition in 2015.

== Medal tables ==
=== Medals by Games ===
Host country

Games	Athletes	Gold	Silver	Bronze	Total	Rank
(Azerbaijan) 2015 Baku	213	2	8	10	20	19
(Belarus) 2019 Minsk	151	3	1	10	14	22
(Poland) 2023 Kraków–Małopolska	408	13	19	18	50	6
(Turkey) 2027 Istanbul	Future event					
Total		18	28	38	84	12

=== Medals by sports ===
Sport	Gold	Silver	Bronze	Total
Canoe sprint	5	1	6	12
Athletics	3	5	1	9
Fencing	3	2	0	5
Muaythai	1	2	2	5
Shooting	1	2	1	4
Boxing	1	1	7	9
Sport climbing	1	1	1	3
Kickboxing	1	0	4	5
Gymnastics	1	0	0	1
Ski jumping	1	0	0	1
Wrestling	0	3	3	6
Canoe slalom	0	3	0	3
Cycling	0	2	4	6
Taekwondo	0	2	0	2
Teqball	0	1	3	4
Swimming	0	1	2	3
Rugby sevens	0	1	0	1
Volleyball	0	1	0	1
Karate	0	0	2	2
3x3 basketball	0	0	1	1
Table tennis	0	0	1	1
Totals (21 entries)	18	28	38	84

== List of medallists ==
Medal	Name(s)	Games	Sport	Event
Gold	Marta Walczykiewicz	(Azerbaijan) 2015 Baku	Canoe sprint	K-1 200 m
Gold	Angelika Wątor	(Azerbaijan) 2015 Baku	Fencing	Women's sabre
Gold	Łukasz Jaworski; Artur Zakrzewski	(Belarus) 2019 Minsk	Gymnastics	Men's synchronized trampoline
Gold	Tomasz Kaczor	(Belarus) 2019 Minsk	Canoe sprint	Men's C-1 1000m
Gold	Karolina Koszewska	(Belarus) 2019 Minsk	Boxing	Women's 69 kg
Gold	Anna Puławska; Dominika Putto; Karolina Naja; Adrianna Kąkol	(Poland) 2023 Kraków–Małopolska	Canoe sprint	Women's K-4 500 m
Gold	Klaudia Breś	(Poland) 2023 Kraków–Małopolska	Shooting	Women's 10 metre air pistol
Gold	Natalia Kałucka	(Poland) 2023 Kraków–Małopolska	Sport climbing	Women's speed
Gold	Anna Puławska	(Poland) 2023 Kraków–Małopolska	Canoe sprint	Women's K-2 500 metres
Gold	Dorota Borowska	(Poland) 2023 Kraków–Małopolska	Canoe sprint	Women's C-1 200 metres
Gold	Ewa Swoboda	(Poland) 2023 Kraków–Małopolska	Athletics	Women's 100 metres
Gold	Wojciech Nowicki	(Poland) 2023 Kraków–Małopolska	Athletics	Men's hammer throw
Gold	Pia Skrzyszowska	(Poland) 2023 Kraków–Małopolska	Athletics	Women's 100 metres hurdles
Gold	Julia Walczyk-Klimaszyk	(Poland) 2023 Kraków–Małopolska	Fencing	Women's individual foil
Gold	Michał Siess	(Poland) 2023 Kraków–Małopolska	Fencing	Men's individual foil
Gold	Martyna Kierczyńska	(Poland) 2023 Kraków–Małopolska	Muaythai	Women's combat 54 kg
Gold	Dawid Kubacki	(Poland) 2023 Kraków–Małopolska	Ski jumping	Men's large hill individual
Gold	Robert Krasoń	(Poland) 2023 Kraków–Małopolska	Kickboxing	Men's full contact -86 kg
Silver	Katarzyna Krawczyk	(Azerbaijan) 2015 Baku	Wrestling	Women's Freestyle 55 kg
Silver	Roksana Zasina	(Azerbaijan) 2015 Baku	Wrestling	Women's Freestyle 53 kg
Silver	Karol Robak	(Azerbaijan) 2015 Baku	Taekwondo	Men's 68 kg
Silver	Magomedmurad Gadzhiev	(Azerbaijan) 2015 Baku	Wrestling	Men's Freestyle 70 kg
Silver	Katarzyna Niewiadoma	(Azerbaijan) 2015 Baku	Cycling	Women's road race
Silver	Paweł Sendyk	(Azerbaijan) 2015 Baku	Swimming	Men's 50 metre butterfly
Silver	Sandra Drabik	(Azerbaijan) 2015 Baku	Boxing	Women's 51 kg
Silver	Poland women's national volleyball team: Katarzyna Skowrońska-Dolata; Agnieszka Bednarek-Kasza; Izabela Bełcik; Sylwia Pycia; Anna Werblińska; Joanna Wołosz; Katarzyna Zaroślińska; Maja Tokarska; Anna Miros; Agnieszka Kąkolewska; Agata Sawicka; Agata Dujarczyk; Natalia Kurnikowska; Daria Paszek	(Azerbaijan) 2015 Baku	Volleyball	Women's tournament
Silver	Filip Prokopyszyn	(Belarus) 2019 Minsk	Cycling	Men's scratch
Silver	Aleksandra Mirosław	(Poland) 2023 Kraków–Małopolska	Sport climbing	Women's speed
Silver	Natalia Kaczmarek	(Poland) 2023 Kraków–Małopolska	Athletics	Women's 400 metres
Silver	Sylwia Szczerbińska; Aleksander Kitewski	(Poland) 2023 Kraków–Małopolska	Canoe sprint	Mixed C-2 200 metres
Silver	Ewa Swoboda; Marika Popowicz-Drapała; Monika Ramaszko; Magdalena Stefanowicz	(Poland) 2023 Kraków–Małopolska	Athletics	Women's 4 × 100 metres relay
Silver	Albert Komański	(Poland) 2023 Kraków–Małopolska	Athletics	Men's 200 metres
Silver	Anna Kiełbasińska; Natalia Kaczmarek; Maksymilian Szwed; Igor Bogaczyński	(Poland) 2023 Kraków–Małopolska	Athletics	Mixed 4 × 100 metres relay
Silver	Krzysztof Kaczkowski	(Poland) 2023 Kraków–Małopolska	Fencing	Men's individual sabre
Silver	none (Note: Athletics at the 2023 European Games were contested in the 2023 European Athletics Team Championships and therefore as in the latter competition, the team medals for overall standing in First Division were given to the nations as a team, but not the individual athletes.)	(Poland) 2023 Kraków–Małopolska	Athletics	First Division
Silver	Natalia Kochańska	(Poland) 2023 Kraków–Małopolska	Shooting	Women's 50 metre rifle three positions
Silver	Martyna Swatowska-Wenglarczyk	(Poland) 2023 Kraków–Małopolska	Fencing	Women's individual épée
Silver	Aleksandra Kowalczuk	(Poland) 2023 Kraków–Małopolska	Taekwondo	Women's +73 kg
Silver	Oskar Siegert	(Poland) 2023 Kraków–Małopolska	Muaythai	Men's combat 67 kg
Silver	Roksana Dargiel	(Poland) 2023 Kraków–Małopolska	Muaythai	Women's combat 51 kg
Silver	Poland women's national rugby sevens team: Patrycja Zawadzka; Julianna Schuster; Tamara Czumer-Iwin; Małgorzata Kołdej; Marta Morus; Katarzyna Paszczyk; Anna Klichowska; Hanna Maliszewska; Julia Druzgała; Natalia Pamięta; Sylwia Witkowska; Martyna Wardaszka	(Poland) 2023 Kraków–Małopolska	Rugby sevens	Women's
Silver	Joanna Wawrzonowska; Klaudia Breś; Julita Borek	(Poland) 2023 Kraków–Małopolska	Shooting	Women's team 25 metre rapid fire pistol
Silver	Dariusz Popiela; Mateusz Polaczyk; Michał Pasiut	(Poland) 2023 Kraków–Małopolska	Canoe slalom	Men's K-1 team
Silver	Adrian Duszak	(Poland) 2023 Kraków–Małopolska	Teqball	Men's singles
Silver	Klaudia Zwolińska	(Poland) 2023 Kraków–Małopolska	Canoe slalom	Women's K-1
Silver	Klaudia Zwolińska	(Poland) 2023 Kraków–Małopolska	Canoe slalom	Women's C-1
Bronze	Maja Włoszczowska	(Azerbaijan) 2015 Baku	Cycling	Women's cross country
Bronze	Ewelina Wojnarowska; Beata Mikołajczyk; Karolina Naja; Edyta Dzieniszewska-Kierkla	(Azerbaijan) 2015 Baku	Canoe sprint	K-4 500 m
Bronze	Iwona Matkowska	(Azerbaijan) 2015 Baku	Wrestling	Women's Freestyle 48 kg
Bronze	Ewelina Wojnarowska	(Azerbaijan) 2015 Baku	Canoe sprint	K-1 500 m
Bronze	Radosław Marcinkiewicz	(Azerbaijan) 2015 Baku	Wrestling	Men's Freestyle 86 kg
Bronze	Lidia Fidura	(Azerbaijan) 2015 Baku	Boxing	Women's 75 kg
Bronze	Aneta Rygielska	(Azerbaijan) 2015 Baku	Boxing	Women's 64 kg
Bronze	Mateusz Polski	(Azerbaijan) 2015 Baku	Boxing	Men's 60 kg
Bronze	Karol Zbutowicz	(Azerbaijan) 2015 Baku	Swimming	Men's 400 m individual medley
Bronze	Jakub Skierka; Jacek Arentewicz; Michał Chudy; Paweł Sendyk	(Azerbaijan) 2015 Baku	Swimming	Men's 4x100 m medley relay
Bronze	Katarzyna Kołodziejczyk; Anna Puławska; Karolina Naja; Helena Wiśniewska	(Belarus) 2019 Minsk	Canoe sprint	Women's K-4 500m
Bronze	Dorota Borowska	(Belarus) 2019 Minsk	Canoe sprint	Women's C1 200m
Bronze	Marta Walczykiewicz	(Belarus) 2019 Minsk	Canoe sprint	Women's K1 200m
Bronze	Sandra Drabik	(Belarus) 2019 Minsk	Boxing	Women's 51 kg
Bronze	Nikol Płosaj; Karolina Karasiewicz; Katarzyna Pawłowska; Justyna Kaczkowska	(Belarus) 2019 Minsk	Cycling	Women’s team pursuit
Bronze	Elżbieta Wójcik	(Belarus) 2019 Minsk	Boxing	Women's 75 kg
Bronze	Natalia Bajor; Li Qian; Natalia Partyka	(Belarus) 2019 Minsk	Table tennis	Women’s team
Bronze	Krzysztof Maksel	(Belarus) 2019 Minsk	Cycling	Men's 1 km time trial
Bronze	Arkadiusz Kułynycz	(Belarus) 2019 Minsk	Wrestling	Men's Greco-Roman 87 kg
Bronze	Daniel Staniszewski	(Belarus) 2019 Minsk	Cycling	Men's omnium
Bronze	Norman Zezula; Aleksander Kitewski	(Poland) 2023 Kraków–Małopolska	Canoe sprint	Men's C-2 500 meters
Bronze	Miłosz Sabiecki	(Poland) 2023 Kraków–Małopolska	Karate	Men's kumite 67 kg
Bronze	Marcin Dzieński	(Poland) 2023 Kraków–Małopolska	Sport climbing	Men's speed
Bronze	Michał Bąbos	(Poland) 2023 Kraków–Małopolska	Karate	Men's kumite 84 kg
Bronze	Aneta Stankiewicz; Julia Piotrowska; Natalia Kochańska	(Poland) 2023 Kraków–Małopolska	Shooting	Women's team 10 metre air rifle
Bronze	Poland men's national 3x3 team: Adrian Bogucki; Szymon Rduch; Mateusz Szlachetka; Przemysław Zamojski	(Poland) 2023 Kraków–Małopolska	3x3 basketball	Men's
Bronze	Norbert Kobielski	(Poland) 2023 Kraków–Małopolska	Athletics	Men's high jump
Bronze	Jakub Rajewski	(Poland) 2023 Kraków–Małopolska	Muaythai	Men's combat 71 kg
Bronze	Dominika Filec	(Poland) 2023 Kraków–Małopolska	Muaythai	Women's combat 60 kg
Bronze	Mateusz Bereźnicki	(Poland) 2023 Kraków–Małopolska	Boxing	Men's 92 kg
Bronze	Marek Pokwap; Alicja Bartnicka	(Poland) 2023 Kraków–Małopolska	Teqball	Mixed doubles
Bronze	Elżbieta Wójcik	(Poland) 2023 Kraków–Małopolska	Boxing	Women's 75 kg
Bronze	Oskar Sobański	(Poland) 2023 Kraków–Małopolska	Kickboxing	Men's full contact -63.5 kg
Bronze	Jakub Pokusa	(Poland) 2023 Kraków–Małopolska	Kickboxing	Men's full contact -75 kg
Bronze	Kinga Szlachcic	(Poland) 2023 Kraków–Małopolska	Kickboxing	Women's full contact -60 kg
Bronze	Karolina Juja	(Poland) 2023 Kraków–Małopolska	Kickboxing	Women's full contact -70 kg
Bronze	Alicja Bartnicka; Ewa Kamińska	(Poland) 2023 Kraków–Małopolska	Teqball	Women's doubles
Bronze	Adrian Duszak; Marek Pokwap	(Poland) 2023 Kraków–Małopolska	Teqball	Men's doubles

== See also ==
- Poland at the Olympics
