= Austria at the European Games =

- IOC code: AUT
- NOC: Austrian Olympic Committee
- Website: www.olympia.at
- Medals: Gold 10 Silver 15 Bronze 14 Total 39

European Games appearances (overview)
- 2015; 2019; 2023; 2027

Austria participated at the inaugural edition of the European Games in 2015.

== Medal tables ==
=== Medals by Games ===
Games	Athletes	Gold	Silver	Bronze	Total	Rank
(Azerbaijan) 2015 Baku	145	2	7	4	13	20
(Belarus) 2019 Minsk	57	1	2	4	7	31
(Poland) 2023 Kraków	170	7	6	6	19	12
(Turkey) 2027 Istanbul	Future event					
Total		10	15	14	39	19

=== Medals by sports ===
Sport	Gold	Silver	Bronze	Total
Ski jumping	3	2	1	6
Karate	2	2	0	4
Synchronised swimming	2	1	1	4
Swimming	2	1	0	3
Sport climbing	1	0	1	2
Shooting	0	2	3	5
Cycling	0	2	2	4
Athletics	0	1	1	2
Canoe slalom	0	1	0	1
Canoe sprint	0	1	0	1
Triathlon	0	1	0	1
Volleyball	0	1	0	1
Judo	0	0	3	3
Breakdancing	0	0	1	1
Table tennis	0	0	1	1
Totals (15 entries)	10	15	14	39

== List of medallists ==
Medal	Name(s)	Games	Sport	Event
Gold	Steffan Sebastian	(Azerbaijan) 2015 Baku	Swimming	Men's 200 metre individual medley
Gold	Caroline Pilhatsch	(Azerbaijan) 2015 Baku	Swimming	Women's 50 metre backstroke
Silver	Mixed team: Anita Baielr Ekemini Bassey Dominik Distelberger Elisabeth Eberl Michaela Egger Nikolaus Franzmair Markus Fuchs Mario Gebhard Benjamin Grill Kira Grunberg Christoph Haslauer Stefanie Huber Ina Huemer Dominik Hufnagl Thomas Kain Matthias Kaserer Julio Kellerer Paul Kilbertus Viola Kleiser Josip Kopic Anita Baielr Sarah Lagger Nina Luyer Pamela Manzerdorfen Gunther Matzinger Gerhard Mayer Verena Menapace Elisabeth Niedereder Valentin Pfeil Verena Preiner Brenton Rowe Roman Schmied Anita Baielr Carina Schrempf Beate Schrott Julia Schwarzinger Benjamin Siart Julia Siart Dominik Sedliaczek Christian Smetana Christian Steinhammer Alexandra Toth Andreas Vojta Susanne Walli Veronika Watzek Lukas Weißhaidinger Jennifer Wenth Eva-Maria Wimberger	(Azerbaijan) 2015 Baku	Athletics	Team Championships
Silver	Bettina Plank	(Azerbaijan) 2015 Baku	Karate	Women's 50 kg
Silver	Alisa Theresa Buchinger	(Azerbaijan) 2015 Baku	Karate	Women's 68 kg
Silver	Anna-Maria Alexandri; Eirini-Marina Alexandri	(Azerbaijan) 2015 Baku	Synchronised swimming	Women's duet
Silver	Yvonne Schuring	(Azerbaijan) 2015 Baku	Canoe sprint	Women's K-1 500 metres
Silver	Lena Maria Plesiutschnig; Katharina Schutzenhofer	(Azerbaijan) 2015 Baku	Volleyball	Women's beach
Silver	Caroline Pilhatsch	(Azerbaijan) 2015 Baku	Swimming	Women's 50 metre butterfly
Bronze	Robert Gardos; Stefan Fegerl; Daniel Habesohn	(Azerbaijan) 2015 Baku	Table tennis	Men's team
Bronze	Anna-Maria Alexandri	(Azerbaijan) 2015 Baku	Synchronised swimming	Solo
Bronze	Olivia Hofmann	(Azerbaijan) 2015 Baku	Shooting	Women's 50 metre rifle three positions
Bronze	Bernadette Graf	(Azerbaijan) 2015 Baku	Judo	Women's 70 kg
Gold	Bettina Plank	(Belarus) 2019 Minsk	Karate	Women's kumite 50 kg
Silver	Franziska Peer; Bernhard Pickl	(Belarus) 2019 Minsk	Shooting	Mixed team 50 metre rifle prone
Silver	Verena Eberhardt	(Belarus) 2019 Minsk	Cycling	Women's omnium
Bronze	Daniel Auer	(Belarus) 2019 Minsk	Cycling	Men's road race
Bronze	Andreas Graf; Andreas Müller	(Belarus) 2019 Minsk	Cycling	Men's madison
Bronze	Stephan Hegyi	(Belarus) 2019 Minsk	Judo	Men's + 100 kg
Bronze	Mixed team: Daniel Allerstorfer Shamil Borchashvili Marko Bubanja Sabrina Filzmoser Bernadette Graf Stephan Hegyi Magdalena Krssakova Michaela Polleres Lukas Reiter Katharina Tanzer	(Belarus) 2019 Minsk	Judo	Mixed team
Gold	Anna-Maria Alexandri; Eirini-Marina Alexandri	(Poland) 2023 Kraków	Artistic swimming	Women's duet technical
Gold	Bettina Plank	(Poland) 2023 Kraków	Karate	Women's kumite -50 kg
Gold	Lukas Knapp	(Poland) 2023 Kraków	Sport climbing	Men's speed
Gold	Anna-Maria Alexandri; Eirini-Marina Alexandri	(Poland) 2023 Kraków	Artistic swimming	Women's duet free
Gold	Jacqueline Seifriedsberger	(Poland) 2023 Kraków	Ski jumping	Women's normal hill individual
Gold	Daniel Tschofenig	(Poland) 2023 Kraków	Ski jumping	Men's normal hill individual
Gold	Mixed team: Marita Kramer Jan Hörl Jacqueline Seifriedsberger Daniel Tschofenig	(Poland) 2023 Kraków	Ski jumping	Mixed team
Silver	Mona Mitterwallner	(Poland) 2023 Kraków	Cycling	Women's mountainbike
Silver	Julia Hauser	(Poland) 2023 Kraków	Triathlon	Women's individual
Silver	Andreas Thum; Sheileen Waibel	(Poland) 2023 Kraków	Shooting	Mixed team 50m rifle 3 positions
Silver	Jan Hörl	(Poland) 2023 Kraków	Ski jumping	Men's normal hill individual
Silver	Jan Hörl	(Poland) 2023 Kraków	Ski jumping	Men's large hill individual
Silver	Felix Oschmautz	(Poland) 2023 Kraków	Canoe slalom	Men's kayak cross
Bronze	Alexander Schmirl; Martin Strempfl; Andreas Thum	(Poland) 2023 Kraków	Shooting	Men's team 10m air rifle
Bronze	Mathias Posch	(Poland) 2023 Kraków	Sport climbing	Men's lead
Bronze	Victoria Hudson	(Poland) 2023 Kraków	Athletics	Women's Javelin Throw
Bronze	Alexander Schmirl	(Poland) 2023 Kraków	Shooting	Men's 50m rifle 3 positions
Bronze	Lil Zoo	(Poland) 2023 Kraków	Breaking	B-Boys
Bronze	Marita Kramer	(Poland) 2023 Kraków	Ski jumping	Women's normal hill individual

== See also ==
- Austria at the Olympics
