= Austria at the 2023 European Games =

- IOC code: AUT
- NOC: Austrian Olympic Committee
- Website: www.olympia.at

in Kraków and Małopolska, Poland 20 June 2023 – 2 July 2023
- Competitors: 171 in 25 sports
- Medals Ranked 12th: Gold 7 Silver 6 Bronze 6 Total 19

European Games appearances (overview)
- 2015; 2019; 2023; 2027

Austria took part in the 2023 European Games, at Kraków and Małopolska, Poland, from 21 June to 2 July 2023.

== Medalists ==
Medal	Name	Sport	Event	Date
1st place, gold medalist(s)	Anna-Maria Alexandri; Eirini-Marina Alexandri	Artistic swimming	Women's duet technical	22 June
1st place, gold medalist(s)	Bettina Plank	Karate	Women's kumite -50 kg	22 June
1st place, gold medalist(s)	Lukas Knapp	Sport climbing	Men's speed	23 June
1st place, gold medalist(s)	Anna-Maria Alexandri; Eirini-Marina Alexandri	Artistic swimming	Women's duet free	24 June
1st place, gold medalist(s)	Jacqueline Seifriedsberger	Ski jumping	Women's normal hill individual	27 June
1st place, gold medalist(s)	Daniel Tschofenig	Ski jumping	Men's normal hill individual	29 June
1st place, gold medalist(s)	Marita Kramer; Jan Hörl; Jacqueline Seifriedsberger; Daniel Tschofenig	Ski jumping	Mixed team	29 June
2nd place, silver medalist(s)	Mona Mitterwallner	Cycling	Women's mountainbike	25 June
2nd place, silver medalist(s)	Julia Hauser	Triathlon	Women's individual	27 June
2nd place, silver medalist(s)	Andreas Thum; Sheileen Waibel	Shooting	Mixed team 50m rifle 3 positions	28 June
2nd place, silver medalist(s)	Jan Hörl	Ski jumping	Men's normal hill individual	29 June
2nd place, silver medalist(s)	Jan Hörl	Ski jumping	Men's large hill individual	1 July
2nd place, silver medalist(s)	Felix Oschmautz	Canoe slalom	Men's kayak cross	2 July
3rd place, bronze medalist(s)	Alexander Schmirl; Martin Strempfl; Andreas Thum	Shooting	Men's team 10m air rifle	24 June
3rd place, bronze medalist(s)	Mathias Posch	Sport climbing	Men's lead	24 June
3rd place, bronze medalist(s)	Victoria Hudson	Athletics	Women's Javelin Throw	25 June
3rd place, bronze medalist(s)	Alexander Schmirl	Shooting	Men's 50m rifle 3 positions	25 June
3rd place, bronze medalist(s)	Lil Zoo	Breaking	B-Boys	27 June
3rd place, bronze medalist(s)	Marita Kramer	Ski jumping	Women's normal hill individual	27 June

== Competitors ==
Sport	Men	Women	Total
Archery	1	1	2
Artistic swimming	0	2	2
Athletics	24	18	42
Badminton	2	3	5
Basketball	4	4	8
Boxing	2	0	2
Breaking	1	0	1
Canoe slalom	3	2	5
Canoe sprint	2	2	4
Cycling	3	3	6
Diving	4	1	5
Fencing	7	5	12
Judo	5	4	9
Karate	0	1	1
Kickboxing	2	3	5
Modern pentathlon	1	1	2
Muaythai	0	1	1
Padel	4	4	8
Shooting	5	4	9
Ski jumping	5	5	10
Sport climbing	9	4	13
Table tennis	2	4	6
Taekwondo	1	2	3
Teqball	2	2	4
Triathlon	3	3	6

== Archery ==
Athlete	Event	Ranking Round		Round of 64	Round of 32	Round of 16	Quarterfinal	Semifinal	Final/BM	
Athlete	Event	Score	Seed	Opposition Score	Opposition Score	Opposition Score	Opposition Score	Opposition Score	Opposition Score	Rank
Andreas Gstoettner	Men's individual recurve	625	44	Olaru (MDA); L 1-7	Did Not Advance					33
Elisabeth Straka	Women's individual recurve	647	20	Davis (IRL); W 6-0	Adiceom (FRA); L 2-6	Did Not Advance				17
Andreas Gstoettner; Elisabeth Straka	Mixed team recurve	1272	20	—	Staudt/Andersen (DEN); W 5-4	Alvarino Garcia/Canales (ESP); L 2-6	Did Not Advance			9

== Artistic swimming ==
Athlete	Event	Qualification		Final	
Athlete	Event	Points	Rank	Points	Rank
Anna-Maria Alexandri; Eirini-Marina Alexandri	Women's duet free	265.1459	1 Q	255.9501	1st place, gold medalist(s)
Anna-Maria Alexandri; Eirini-Marina Alexandri	Women's duet technical	—		266.4584	1st place, gold medalist(s)

== Athletics ==
Austria has competed in the third division of the 2023 European Athletics Team Championships which was held in Chorzów during the Games.

=== Team ===
Team	Event		Event points																			Total	Rank
Team	Event		100m	200m	400m	800m	1500m	5000m	110m h*	400m h	3000m SC	4 × 100 m	4 × 400 m**	SP	JT	HT	DT	PV	HJ	TJ	LJ	Total	Rank
Austria	Team Championships Third Division	Men	15	13	14	12	15	14	13	14	13	0	14	7	14	12	15	15	14	12	11	473.50	2
Austria	Team Championships Third Division	Women	15	15	13	13	12	12	14	15	12	15	14	11	15	13	14	14	11.5	10	12	473.50	2

key: h: hurdles; SC; Steeplechase: SP; Shot put: JT: Javelin: HT: Hammer: DT: Discus: PV: Pole vault: HJ: High jump: TJ: Triple Jump: LJ: Long Jump

- Women compete at 100 metre hurdles, rather than 110 metre hurdles.
- 4 x 400 metres is held as a single mixed sex event

=== Individual ===
As a participant in the team event, each nation automatically enters one athlete in each of the individual events.

Event	Male Athlete	Score	Division ranking	Overall ranking	Female athlete	Score	Division ranking	Overall ranking
100m	Markus Fuchs	10.36	1	13	Magdalena Lindner	11.57	1	21
200m	Markus Fuchs	20.99	3	16	Susanne Gogl-Walli	23.09	1	7
400m	Niklas Strohmayer-Dangl	46.64	2	22	Anna Mager	54.26	3	30
800m	Elias Lachkovics	1:52.00	4	34	Caroline Bredlinger	2:04.78	3	26
1500m	Raphael Pallitsch	3:42.52	1	15	Sandra Schauer	4:31.96	4	33
5000m	Andreas Vojta	14:17.02	2	26	Sandra Schauer	17:28.65	4	33
110m/100m h	Jan Mitsche	15.12	3	33	Karin Strametz	13.25	2	14
400m h	Leo Köhldorfer	50.70	2	17	Lena Pressler	57.02	1	15
3000m SC	Tobias Rattinger	8:53.59	3	19	Katharina Pesendorfer	10:33.55	4	28
4 × 100 m	Andreas Meyer-Lux; Lukas Pullnig; Stephan Pacher; Noel Waroschitz	Disqualified			Karin Strametz; Susanne Gogl-Walli; Isabel Posch; Magdalena Lindner	44.18	1	12
4 × 400 m (mixed)	—				Alessandro Greco; Lena Pressler; Leo Kohldorfer; Susanne Gogl-Walli	3:22.46	2	25
Shot Put	Will Dibo	14.30	9	41	Sarah Lagger	13.43	5	32
Javelin	Matthias Lasch	65.24	2	31	Victoria Hudson	60.27	1	3rd place, bronze medalist(s)
Hammer	Killian Moser	56.42	4	32	Bettina Weber	59.09	3	26
Discus	Lukas Weißhaidinger	62.12	1	7	Djeneba Toure	53.12	2	14
Pole Vault	Alexander Auer	5.10	1	20	Shanna Tureczek	3.60	2	26
High Jump	Lionel Afan Strasser	2.11	2	22	Sarah Lagger	1.70	4	34
Triple Jump	Endiorass Kingley	15.38	4	20	Jana Schnabel	12.42	6	34
Long Jump	Samuel Szihn	7.35	5	27	Ingeborg Grunwald	5.92	4	31

== Badminton ==
Austria qualified five badminton players across four events.

Athlete	Event	Group stage				Round of 16	Quarterfinal	Semifinal	Final	
Athlete	Event	Opposition Score	Opposition Score	Opposition Score	Rank	Opposition Score	Opposition Score	Opposition Score	Opposition Score	Rank
Luka Wraber	Men's singles	Carraggi (BEL); L 0-2	Louda (CZE); L 0-2	Schäfer (GER); L 1-2	4	Did Not Advance				
Katrin Neudolt	Women's singles	Blichfeldt (DEN); L 0-2	Schmidt (LUX); L 1-2	Polanc (SLO); L 0-2	4	Did Not Advance				
Serena Au Yeong; Katharina Hochmeir	Women's doubles	Jille/Seinen (NED); L 0-2	Azurmendi/Corrales (ESP); L 1-2	Az Zahra/Maftuha (AZE); L 1-2	4	—	Did Not Advance			
Philip Birker; Katharina Hochmeir	Mixed doubles	Lamsfuß/Lohau (GER); L 0-2	Ivančič/Polanc (SLO); W 2-0	Ellis/Smith (GBR); L 0-2	3	—	Did not advance			

== Basketball ==
Team	Event	Group Stage				Quarterfinals	Semifinals	Final	
Team	Event	Opposition Score	Opposition Score	Opposition Score	Rank	Opposition Score	Opposition Score	Opposition Score	Rank
Filip Krämer; Matthias Linortner; Nico Kaltenbrunner; Martin Trmal	Men's tournament	Switzerland; W 21-16	Lithuania; W 22-18	Romania; W 21-13	1 Q	Belgium; L 20-21	Did Not Advance		5
Camilla Neumann; Anja Fuchs; Alexia Allesch; Rebekka Kalaydjiev	Women's tournament	Romania; L 14-17	Greece; W 15-8	Germany; W 20-17	2 Q	Spain; L 16-19	Did Not Advance		5

== Boxing ==
Athlete	Event	Round of 64	Round of 32	Round of 16	Quarterfinal	Semifinal	Final	
Athlete	Event	Opposition Result	Opposition Result	Opposition Result	Opposition Result	Opposition Result	Opposition Result	Rank
Arsen Chabyan	Men's light welterweight	—	Clancy (IRL); L 0-5	Did Not Advance				17
Esad Avdic	Men's light middleweight	Bye	Trofimcuk (LTU); L 1-4	Did Not Advance				17

== Breaking ==
Athlete	Event	Group Stage				Quarterfinal	Semifinal	Final / BM	
Athlete	Event	Opposition Result	Opposition Result	Opposition Result	Rank	Opposition Result	Opposition Result	Opposition Result	Rank
Lil Zoo	B-Boys	Cis (BEL); W 2-0	Kuzya (UKR); W 2-0	Xak (ESP); D 1-1	1 Q	Lagaet (FRA); W 2-0	Menno (NED); L 0-3	Lee (NED); W 2-1	3rd place, bronze medalist(s)

== Canoe slalom ==
Athlete	Event	Preliminary				Quarterfinal		Semifinal		Final	
Athlete	Event	Run 1	Rank	Run 2	Rank	Time	Rank	Time	Rank	Time	Rank
Felix Oschmautz	Men's kayak	88.44	17 Q	—				90.65	4 Q	90.01	4
Felix Oschmautz	Men's kayak cross	64.48	13 Q	—			2 Q	—	2 Q	—	2nd place, silver medalist(s)
Mario Leitner	Men's kayak	90.50	28 Q	—				95.22	22	Did Not Advance	22
Mario Leitner	Men's kayak cross	63.84	8 Q	—			1 Q	FLT(7)	4	Did Not Advance	8
Paul Preisl	Men's kayak	94.74	40	94.02	13	—		Did Not Advance			43
Paul Preisl	Men's kayak cross	69.95	49	—		Did Not Advance					49
Corinna Kuhnle	Women's kayak	95.39	2 Q	—				103.55	6 Q	107.08	6
Corinna Kuhnle	Women's kayak cross	70.90	23	—		Did Not Advance					23
Viktoria Wolffhardt	Women's kayak	154.76	42	105.48	6 Q	—		119.44	26	Did Not Advance	26
Viktoria Wolffhardt	Women's canoe	109.91	17 Q	—				175.35	29	Did Not Advance	29
Viktoria Wolffhardt	Women's kayak cross	Did Not Start									
Mario Leitner; Felix Oschmautz; Paul Preisl	Men's kayak team	—								103.09	7

== Canoe sprint ==
Athlete	Event	Heats		Semifinal		Final	
Athlete	Event	Time	Rank	Time	Rank	Time	Rank
Manfred Pallinger	Men's C-1 200 metres	41.584	8 sf	44.010	9	Did Not Advance	
Manfred Pallinger	Men's C-1 500 metres	1:56.671	8 sf	1:53.985	7	Did Not Advance	
Timon Maurer	Men's K-1 500 metres	1:41.211	2 SF	1:39.922	2 FA	1:38.584	6
Adriana Lehaci; Ana Lehaci	Women's K-2 500 metres	1:46.964	6 SF	1:47.502	7	Did Not Advance	
Ana Lehaci; Timon Maurer	Mixed K-2 200 metres	36.357	6 SF	35.492	7 FB	36.434	6

== Cycling ==
Athlete	Event	Time	Rank
Max Foidl	Men's mountainbike	1:22:12	20
Gregor Raggl	Men's mountainbike	1:24:11	37
Karl Markt	Men's mountainbike	1:27:20	45
Mona Mitterwallner	Women's mountainbike	1:18:52	2nd place, silver medalist(s)
Laura Stigger	Women's mountainbike	1:20:37	8
Corina Druml	Women's mountainbike	1 Lap	48

== Diving ==
Athlete	Event	Preliminary		Final	
Athlete	Event	Points	Rank	Points	Rank
Dariush Lotfi	Men's 1m springboard	295.15	21	Did Not Advance	
Nikolaj Schaller	Men's 1m springboard	281.60	23	Did Not Advance	
Nikolaj Schaller	Men's 3m springboard	363.00	18	Did Not Advance	
Alexander Mario Hart	Men's 3m springboard	355.45	21	Did Not Advance	
Anton Knoll	Men's 10m platform	341.55	11 Q	379.40	6
Cara Albiez	Women's 3m springboard	218.85	20	Did Not Advance	
Alexander Mario Hart; Nikolaj Schaller	Men's synchronized 3m springboard	—		345.51	9

== Fencing ==
Athlete	Event	Preliminaries	Round of 128	Round of 64	Round of 32	Round of 16	Quarterfinal	Semifinal	Final	
Athlete	Event	W/B	Opposition Result	Opposition Result	Opposition Result	Opposition Result	Opposition Result	Opposition Result	Opposition Result	Rank
Moritz Lechner	Men's individual foil	4/6	—	Jans Kohneke (NED); W 15-10	Cuk (SRB); W 15-5	Yunes (UKR); L 9-15	Did Not Advance			15
Johannes Poscharnig	Men's individual foil	5/6	—	Yunes (UKR); L 8-15	Did Not Advance					33
Maximilian Ettelt	Men's individual foil	3/6	—	Komsic (CRO); L 7-15	Did Not Advance					46
Tobias Reichetzer	Men's individual foil	4/6	—	Van Egmond (NED); W 15-14	Llavador (ESP); W 15-8	Siess (POL); L 10-15	Did Not Advance			14
Jan Schuhmann	Men's individual épée	3/6	Bye	Heinamaa (FIN); L 9-15	Did Not Advance					53
Alexander Biro	Men's individual épée	4/6	Bye	Reizlin (UKR); L 5-15	Did Not Advance					45
Josef Mahringer	Men's individual épée	3/6	Bye	Jurka (CZE); W 15-14	Stankevych (UKR); L 3-15	Did Not Advance				31
Freya Cenker	Women's individual foil	1/6	—	Did Not Advance						39
Lilli Maria Brugger	Women's individual foil	2/6	—	Myroniuk (UKR); W 10-7	Stutchbury (GBR); L 8-12	Did Not Advance				31
Maria Kraenkl	Women's individual foil	2/6	—	Castro (ESP); L 6-15	Did Not Advance					33
Olivia Wohlgemuth	Women's individual foil	3/6	—	Bye	Schreiber (SWE); W 15-11	Pasztor (HUN); L 4-15	Did Not Advance			15
Leonore Praxmarer	Women's individual épée	2/6	—	Favre (SUI); L 4-15	Did Not Advance					52
Johannes Poscharnig; Moritz Lechner; Tobias Reichetzer; Maximilian Ettelt	Men's team foil	—				Hungary; L 31-45	Denmark; L 39-45	Netherlands; W 45-32	Spain; L 35-45	14
Josef Mahringer; Alexander Biro; Jan Schuhman	Men's team épée	—			Finland; W 45-43	Switzerland; L 38-45	Israel; L 36-45	Netherlands; L 39-45	Belgium; L 33-45	16
Freya Cenker; Olivia Wohlgemuth; Lilli Maria Brugger	Women's team foil	—				Great Britain; W 45-37	France; L 42-45	Poland; L 32-45	Spain; L 33-45	8

== Judo ==
Athlete	Category	Round of 32	Round of 16	Quarterfinals	Semifinals	Final	
Athlete	Category	Opposition Result	Opposition Result	Opposition Result	Opposition Result	Opposition Result	Rank
Movli Borchashvilli; Elena Anna Dengg; Aaron Fara; Samuel Gaßner; Verena Hiden; Maria Sophia Hoellwart; Michaela Polleres; Lukas Reiter; Thomas Scharfetter	Mixed Team	Spain; W 4-3	Germany; L 1-4	Did Not Advance			9

== Karate ==
Athlete	Event	Group Stage				Semifinal	Final	
Athlete	Event	Opposition Result	Opposition Result	Opposition Result	Rank	Opposition Result	Opposition Result	Rank
Bettina Plank	Women's kumite 50 kg	Depta (POL); W 5-1	Kryva (UKR); W 4-1	Kontou (CYP); W 1-0	1 Q	Ozcelik Arapoglu (TUR); W 5-3	Perfetto (ITA); W 1-0	1st place, gold medalist(s)

== Kickboxing ==
Athlete	Category	Quarterfinals	Semifinals	Final/BM	
Athlete	Category	Opposition Result	Opposition Result	Opposition Result	Rank
Marco Masser	Men's point fighting 74 kg	Mancari (SUI); L 14-17	Did Not Advance		5
Raphael Wassertheurer	Men's point fighting 84 kg	Albanese (ITA); L 2-11	Did Not Advance		5
Lisa Heim	Women's point fighting 50 kg	Barada (SLO); L 1-11	Did Not Advance		5
Nurhana Fazlic	Women's point fighting 60 kg	Ceci (ITA); L 5-16	Did Not Advance		5
Viktoria Hader	Women's point fighting 70 kg	Kondar (HUN); L 3-6	Did Not Advance		5

== Modern pentathlon ==
Athlete	Event	Qualification								Semifinal								Final									
Athlete	Event	Fencing		Swimming		Laser Run		Total points	Rank	Fencing		Swimming		Laser Run		Total points	Rank	Show Jumping		Fencing		Swimming		Laser Run		Total points	Rank
Athlete	Event	W/L	Points	Result	Points	Result	Points	Total points	Rank	W/L	Points	Result	Points	Result	Points	Total points	Rank	Result	Points	W/L	Points	Result	Points	Result	Points	Total points	Rank
Gustav Gustenau	Men's individual	15-14	215	1:59.01	312	11:13.80	627	1154	20 r	Did Not Advance																	
Lisa Sophie Axmann	Women's individual	6-23	152	2:24.65	261	13:36.40	484	897	30 r	Did Not Advance																	

== Muaythai ==
Athlete	Event	Quarterfinal	Semifinal	Final	Rank
Athlete	Event	Opposition Result	Opposition Result	Opposition Result	Rank
Rebecca Hoedl	Women's 51 kg	Dargiel (POL); L 27-30	Did Not Advance		5

== Padel ==
Athlete	Event	Round of 32	Round of 16	Quarterfinal	Semifinal	Final	Rank
Athlete	Event	Opposition Result	Opposition Result	Opposition Result	Opposition Result	Opposition Result	Rank
Dominik Bierent; Michal-Krzyszto Brzuszkiewicz	Men's doubles	Fazendeiro/Oliveira (POR); L 0-2	Did Not Advance				17
Rainhard Boisits; Hannes David Pilser	Men's doubles	Deus/Deus (POR); L 0-2	Did Not Advance				17
Barbara Prenner; Anna Schmid	Women's doubles	Lukasiak/Maciocha (POL); L 0-2	Did Not Advance				17
Rebeca Fernandez; Sabrina Urban	Women's doubles	Hechenberger/Meyer (SUI); L 0-2	Did Not Advance				17

== Shooting ==
Athlete	Event	Qualification				Final/BM	
Athlete	Event	Score	Rank	Score	Rank	Score	Rank
Richard Zechmeister	Men's 10m air pistol	577	12	—		Did Not Advance	
Richard Zechmeister	Men's 25m rapid fire pistol	283	21	565	21	Did Not Advance	
Daniel Kral	Men's 10m air pistol	562	36	—		Did Not Advance	
Daniel Kral	Men's 25m rapid fire pistol	288	14	575	13	Did Not Advance	
Martin Strempfl	Men's 10m air rifle	629.6	5 Q	—		259.8	4
Alexander Schmirl	Men's 10m air rifle	628.9	8 Q	—		206.7	6
Alexander Schmirl	Men's 50m rifle 3 positions	595	1 Q	—		406.8	3rd place, bronze medalist(s)
Andreas Thum	Men's 50m rifle 3 positions	586	17	—		Did Not Advance	
Sylvia Maria Steiner	Women's 10m air pistol	569	17	—		Did Not Advance	
Sylvia Maria Steiner	Women's 25 metre rapid fire pistol	288	14	580	6 Q	9	7
Marlene Pribitzer	Women's 10m air rifle	628.0	9	—		Did Not Advance	
Nadine Ungerank	Women's 50m rifle 3 positions	585	12	—		Did Not Advance	
Sheileen Waibel	Women's 50m rifle 3 positions	578	25	—		Did Not Advance	
Alexander Schmirl; Martin Strempfl; Andreas Thum	Men's team 10m air rifle	944.7	1 Q	627.5	3 QB	Ukraine; W 16-2	3rd place, bronze medalist(s)
Alexander Schmirl; Martin Strempfl; Andreas Thum	Men's team 50m rifle 3 positions	513	8	Did Not Advance			
Marlene Pribitzer; Nadine Ungerank; Sheileen Waibel	Women's team 10m air rifle	935.2	8 Q	624.9	6	Did Not Advance	
Marlene Pribitzer; Nadine Ungerank; Sheileen Waibel	Women's team 50m rifle 3 positions	1306	10	Did Not Advance			
Marlene Pribitzer; Alexander Schmirl	Mixed team 10m air rifle	627.6	10	—		Did Not Advance	
Sheileen Waibel; Martin Strempfl	Mixed team 10m air rifle	624.2	23	—		Did Not Advance	
Sylvia Maria Steiner; Richard Zechmeister	Mixed team 10m air pistol	575	8	—		Did Not Advance	
Andreas Thum; Sheileen Waibel	Mixed team 50m rifle 3 positions	888	1 Q	585	1 Q	Switzerland; L 10-16	2nd place, silver medalist(s)
Alexander Schmirl; Nadine Ungerank	Mixed team 50m rifle 3 positions	882	2 Q	579	6	Did Not Advance	

== Ski jumping ==
Athlete	Event	1st Round		Final Round		Total Points	
Athlete	Event	Result	Rank	Result	Rank	Result	Rank
Daniel Tschofenig	Men's normal hill individual	136.0	1 Q	134.3	1	270.3	1st place, gold medalist(s)
Daniel Tschofenig	Men's large hill individual	130.7	8 Q	136.2	2	266.9	4
Jan Hörl	Men's normal hill individual	128.4	3 Q	134.3	1	262.7	2nd place, silver medalist(s)
Jan Hörl	Men's large hill individual	140.5	1 Q	132.5	5	273.0	2nd place, silver medalist(s)
Markus Müller	Men's normal hill individual	115.8	18 Q	120.2	13	236.0	14
Markus Müller	Men's large hill individual	106.5	33	Did Not Advance			
Manuel Fettner	Men's normal hill individual	112.4	21 Q	118.5	16	230.9	18
Manuel Fettner	Men's large hill individual	122.2	16 Q	115.0	19	237.2	15
Hannah Wiegele	Women's normal hill individual	91.0	20 Q	106.3	15	197.3	17
Hannah Wiegele	Women's large hill individual	80.3	19 Q	75.1	24	155.4	21
Julia Mühlbacher	Women's normal hill individual	103.8	12 Q	107.8	12	211.6	13
Julia Mühlbacher	Women's large hill individual	93.8	13 Q	103.0	11	196.8	12
Jacqueline Seifriedsberger	Women's normal hill individual	133.7	1 Q	128.9	2	262.6	1st place, gold medalist(s)
Jacqueline Seifriedsberger	Women's large hill individual	113.5	5 Q	127.4	3	240.9	4
Marita Kramer	Women's normal hill individual	124.3	3 Q	118.3	6	242.6	3rd place, bronze medalist(s)
Marita Kramer	Women's large hill individual	111.9	7 Q	110.2	8	222.1	8
Chiara Kreuzer	Women's normal hill individual	112.2	9 Q	121.8	4	234.0	6
Chiara Kreuzer	Women's large hill individual	117.9	3 Q	119.7	5	237.6	5
Marita Kramer; Jan Hörl; Jacqueline Seifriedsberger; Daniel Tschofenig	Mixed team	468.3	1 Q	471.0	1	939.3	1st place, gold medalist(s)

== Sport climbing ==
Athlete	Event	Qualification			Elimination	Quarterfinal	Semifinal		Final	
Athlete	Event	Time	Time	Seed	Opponent Result	Opponent Result	Opponent Result	Rank	Opponent Result	Rank
Mathias Posch	Men's lead	—					Top	1 Q	38	3rd place, bronze medalist(s)
Timo Užnik	Men's lead	—					29+	14	Did Not Advance	
Ilja Auersperg	Men's boulder	—					1T1z (4 2)	8	Did Not Advance	
Julian Wimmer	Men's boulder	—					0T4z (0 21)	10	Did Not Advance	
Kevin Amon	Men's speed	7.161	5.677	5	Bader (GER); W 5.644 - 6.080	Garnier (FRA); L 6.373 - 5.765	Did Not Advance			
Lukas Knapp	Men's speed	5.755	7.139	7	Kříž (CZE); W 5.919 - 6.993	Stokes (GBR); W 6.601 - Fall	Dzieński (POL); W 5.732 - 5.895		Granier (FRA); W 5.892 - 6.404	1st place, gold medalist(s)
Mattea Pötzi	Women's lead	—					Top	1 Q	38+	4
Eva Hammelmüller	Women's lead	—					43+	8 Q	32	7
Lea Kempf	Women's boulder	—					0T1z (0 1)	13	Did Not Advance	
Anna Bolius	Women's boulder	—					0T0z (0 0)	15	Did Not Advance	

== Table tennis ==
Athlete	Event	Preliminary Round 1	Preliminary Round 2	Round of 32	Round of 16	Quarterfinal	Semifinal	Final	
Athlete	Event	Opponent Result	Opponent Result	Opponent Result	Opponent Result	Opponent Result	Opponent Result	Opponent Result	Rank
Daniel Habesohn	Men's singles	Bye	Sgouropoulos (GRE); W 4-1	Pitchford (GBR); W 4-3	Möregårdh (SWE); W 4-3	Gaćina (CRO); L 1-4	Did Not Advance		5
Robert Gardos	Men's singles	Bye		Oláh (FIN); W 4-1	Jorgić (SLO); L 2-4	Did Not Advance			9
Karoline Mischek	Women's singles	Avameri (EST); W 4-2	Malobabić (CRO); L 3-4	Did Not Advance					33
Sofia Polcanova	Women's singles	Bye		Toliou (GRE); W 4-0	Bajor (POL); L 1-4	Did Not Advance			9
Anastasia Sterner; Jia Liu; Sofia Polcanova	Women's team	—			Poland; L 1-3	Did Not Advance			9
Robert Gardos; Sofia Polcanova	Mixed doubles	—			Oyebode/Monfardini (ITA); W 3-0	Ionescu/Szőcs (ROU); L 1-3	Did Not Advance		5

== Taekwondo ==
Athlete	Events	Round of 16	Quarterfinal	Semifinal/Repechage	Final/BM	
Athlete	Events	Opponent Score	Opponent Score	Opponent Score	Opponent Score	Rank
Aleksandar Radojkovic	Men's 80 kg	Hrnic (DEN); L 1-2	Did Not Advance	Telikostoglou (GRE); L 0-2	Did Not Advance	7
Melanie Kindl	Women's 57 kg	Tvaronavičiūtė (LTU); L 1-2	Did Not Advance			9
Marlene Jahl	Women's +73 kg	Antoniou (CYP); W 2-0	Kowalczuk (POL); L 0-2	Podolian (UKR); W 2-0	Avoulete (FRA); L 1-2	5

== Teqball ==
Athlete	Event	Group stage				Quarterfinal	Semifinal	Final	
Athlete	Event	Opposition Score	Opposition Score	Opposition Score	Rank	Opposition Score	Opposition Score	Opposition Score	Rank
Benedikt H-Wellenhof	Men's singles	Sargsyan (ARM); L 0-2	Thomson (DEN); L 0-2	—	3	Did Not Advance			
Andrea Sommer	Women's singles	Lemajić (SRB); W 2-1	Janicsek (HUN); L 0-2	Vranić (CRO); W 2-0	2 Q	d'Alessandro (ITA); L 0-2	Did Not Advance		5
Benedikt H-Wellenhof; Daniel Neuhold	Men's doubles	Shevchuk/Usychenko (UKR); L 0-2	Duszak/Pokwap (POL); L 0-2	—	3	Did Not Advance			
Andrea Sommer; Nina Steinbauer	Women's doubles	Bartnicka/Kaminska (POL); L 0-2	Mereuta/Tonu (MDA); L 1-2	Lemajić/Umicevic (SRB); L 1-2	4	Did Not Advance			
Daniel Neuhold; Nina Steinbauer	Mixed doubles	Munteanu/Mereuta (MDA); W 2-1	d'Alessandro/Lombardi (ITA); W 2-0	Vasas/Katz (HUN); L 0-2	2 Q	Pokwap/Bartnicka (POL); L 0-2	Did Not Advance		5

== Triathlon ==
Athlete	Event	Swim		T1		Bike		T2		Total	
Athlete	Event	Time	Rank	Time	Rank	Time	Rank	Time	Rank	Time	Rank
Alois Knabl	Men's individual	18:20	5	19:13	6	1:16:55	40	1:17:24	40	1:49:59	30
Leon Pauger	Men's individual	18:40	28	19:31	25	1:15:57	6	1:16:22	7	1:49:13	25
Lukas Pertl	Men's individual	19:22	43	20:12	43	1:16:29	36	1:16:55	36	1:48:48	22
Julia Hauser	Women's individual	20:38	21	21:34	20	1:22:04	12	1:22:34	13	1:57:15	2nd place, silver medalist(s)
Sara Vilic	Women's individual	19:46	15	20:43	14	1:26:13	36	1:26:44	36	2:06:43	40
Lukas Pertl; Julia Hauser; Alois Knabl; Sara Vilic	Mixed relay	—								1:09:18	9
