= Ski jumping at the 2023 European Games – Mixed team =

Mixed team at the 2023 European Games
- Venue: Średnia Krokiew, Zakopane
- Date: 29 June
- Competitors: 40 from 10 nations
- Winning points: 939.3

Medalists
gold medal	Marita Kramer; Jan Hörl; Jacqueline Seifriedsberger; Daniel Tschofenig	Austria
silver medal	Anna Odine Strøm; Robert Johansson; Eirin Maria Kvandal; Marius Lindvik	Norway
bronze medal	Nika Prevc; Timi Zajc; Nika Križnar; Anže Lanišek	Slovenia

The mixed team competition of the 2023 European Games was held on 29 June at the Średnia Krokiew hill in Zakopane.

== Results ==
The final started at 17:30.

Rank	Bib	Country	Round 1			Final round			Total
Rank	Bib	Country	Distance (m)	Points	Rank	Distance (m)	Points	Rank	Points
1st place, gold medalist(s)	10; 10–1; 10–2; 10–3; 10–4	Austria; Marita Kramer; Jan Hörl; Jacqueline Seifriedsberger; Daniel Tschofenig	98.0; 102.5; 95.5; 98.0	468.3; 111.4; 121.8; 116.9; 118.2	1	96.5; 106.0; 99.5; 104.0	471.0; 105.7; 126.7; 113.5; 125.1	1	939.3; 217.1; 248.5; 230.4; 243.3
2nd place, silver medalist(s)	9; 9–1; 9–2; 9–3; 9–4	Norway; Anna Odine Strøm; Robert Johansson; Eirin Maria Kvandal; Marius Lindvik	94.0; 99.5; 97.5; 92.5	437.7; 102.0; 112.8; 116.1; 106.8	2	95.0; 98.0; 100.0; 94.5	439.0; 104.1; 107.1; 117.0; 110.8	3	876.7; 206.1; 219.9; 233.1; 217.6
3rd place, bronze medalist(s)	8; 8–1; 8–2; 8–3; 8–4	Slovenia; Nika Prevc; Timi Zajc; Nika Križnar; Anže Lanišek	99.5; 92.5; 98.5; 96.5	431.5; 112.6; 96.8; 115.7; 106.4	3	101.0; 97.5; 102.0; 90.0	440.5; 118.4; 104.0; 122.9; 95.2	2	872.0; 231.0; 200.8; 238.6; 201.6
4	7; 7–1; 7–2; 7–3; 7–4	Germany; Anna Rupprecht; Constantin Schmid; Selina Freitag; Philipp Raimund	94.0; 97.5; 93.5; 105.0	402.5; 97.6; 110.1; 103.0; 91.8	4	89.5; 99.5; 97.5; 93.0	415.8; 91.2; 111.9; 111.5; 101.2	4	818.3; 188.8; 222.0; 214.5; 193.0
5	6; 6–1; 6–2; 6–3; 6–4	Poland; Anna Twardosz; Dawid Kubacki; Nicole Konderla; Piotr Żyła	87.5; 101.5; 90.0; 105.5	400.5; 77.6; 119.1; 82.8; 121.0	5	81.0; 96.5; 77.5; 102.0	366.7; 72.7; 103.7; 71.0; 119.3	7	767.2; 150.3; 222.8; 153.8; 240.3
6	5; 5–1; 5–2; 5–3; 5–4	Switzerland; Emely Torazza; Killian Peier; Sina Arnet; Gregor Deschwanden	76.0; 93.5; 91.5; 106.5	378.5; 63.9; 100.3; 93.0; 121.3	6	81.5; 96.5; 90.0; 101.0	387.2; 66.7; 106.8; 96.3; 117.4	5	765.7; 130.6; 207.1; 189.3; 238.7
7	4; 4–1; 4–2; 4–3; 4–4	France; Julia Clair; Valentin Foubert; Joséphine Pagnier; Enzo Milesi	79.0; 88.5; 90.5; 97.5	352.2; 72.4; 91.7; 89.8; 98.3	7	93.0; 90.0; 83.5; 93.5	371.0; 90.7; 91.5; 86.3; 102.5	6	723.2; 163.1; 183.2; 176.1; 200.8
8	3; 3–1; 3–2; 3–3; 3–4	Romania; Alessia Mîțu-Coșca; Mihnea Spulber; Daniela Haralambie; Daniel Cacina	68.0; 89.0; 93.0; 90.5	303.4; 44.2; 84.3; 89.3; 85.6	8	66.0; 86.0; 76.0; 88.5	277.1; 40.3; 77.1; 73.3; 86.4	8	580.5; 84.5; 161.4; 162.6; 172.0
9	2; 2–1; 2–2; 2–3; 2–4	Czech Republic; Karolína Indráčková; David Rygl; Klára Ulrichová; Radek Rýdl	80.0; 83.5; 74.0; 90.0	276.4; 68.8; 74.7; 52,0; 80.9	9	did not advance			276.4; 68.8; 74.7; 52,0; 80.9
10	1; 1–1; 1–2; 1–3; 1–4	Ukraine; Zhanna Hlukhova; Yevhen Marusiak; Tetiana Pylypchuk; Vitaliy Kalinichenko	63.0; 92.5; 65.5; 86.5	242.9; 26.0; 96.6; 39.1; 81.2	10	did not advance			242.9; 26.0; 96.6; 39.1; 81.2
