= Shooting at the 2023 European Games – Women's team 10 metre air rifle =

Women's team 10 metre air rifle at the 2023 European Games
- Venue: Wrocław Shooting Centre
- Dates: 24 June
- Competitors: 36 from 12 nations
- Teams: 12

Medalists
gold medal	Nina Christen; Audrey Gogniat; Chiara Leone	Switzerland
silver medal	Jeanette Hegg Duestad; Milda Marina Haugen; Jenny Stene	Norway
bronze medal	Natalia Kochańska; Julia Piotrowska; Aneta Stankiewicz	Poland

The women's team 10 metre air rifle event at the 2023 European Games took place on 24 June at the Wrocław Shooting Centre.

== Records ==
Prior to this competition, the existing world, European and Games records were as follows.

Qualification
World Record	—	—	—	—
European Record	Norway; Jeanette Hegg Duestad; Mari Bårdseng Løvseth; Jenny Stene	951.0	Cairo, Egypt	2 March 2022
Games Record	—	—	—	—

== Results ==
=== Qualification 1 ===
Rank	Country	Athlete	Series			Total	Team total	Notes
Rank	Country	Athlete	1	2	3	Total	Team total	Notes
1	Norway	Jeanette Hegg Duestad	104.6	106.9	106.3	317.8	945.6	Q, GR
1	Norway	Jenny Stene	105.0	104.4	105.8	315.2	945.6	Q, GR
1	Norway	Milda Marina Haugen	104.3	103.7	104.6	312.6	945.6	Q, GR
2	Slovenia	Urška Hrašovec	105.6	105.4	103.3	314.3	941.1	Q
2	Slovenia	Živa Dvoršak	103.6	105.1	105.5	314.2	941.1	Q
2	Slovenia	Klavdija Jerovšek	104.5	103.8	104.3	312.6	941.1	Q
3	France	Océanne Muller	105.7	105.6	103.7	315.0	940.6	Q
3	France	Jade Bordet	102.9	104.8	105.5	313.2	940.6	Q
3	France	Judith Gomez	103.9	103.4	105.1	312.4	940.6	Q
4	Hungary	Eszter Dénes	106.4	104.3	105.8	316.5	940.4	Q
4	Hungary	Eszter Mészáros	104.6	104.6	103.5	312.7	940.4	Q
4	Hungary	Gitta Bajos	101.3	105.0	104.9	311.2	940.4	Q
5	Switzerland	Chiara Leone	104.6	104.9	105.0	314.5	940.1	Q
5	Switzerland	Audrey Gogniat	103.1	105.8	105.1	314.0	940.1	Q
5	Switzerland	Nina Christen	104.3	102.7	104.6	311.6	940.1	Q
6	Germany	Anna Janssen	105.1	105.3	105.8	316.2	939.6	Q
6	Germany	Lisa Müller	104.3	104.3	104.8	313.4	939.6	Q
6	Germany	Jolyn Beer	103.2	103.9	102.9	310.0	939.6	Q
7	Poland	Aneta Stankiewicz	103.6	104.8	104.7	313.1	937.8	Q
7	Poland	Natalia Kochańska	103.2	104.2	105.4	312.8	937.8	Q
7	Poland	Julia Piotrowska	104.3	102.7	104.9	311.9	937.8	Q
8	Austria	Marlene Pribitzer	105.1	104.5	104.8	314.4	935.2	Q
8	Austria	Sheileen Waibel	103.1	103.5	104.3	310.9	935.2	Q
8	Austria	Nadine Ungerank	104.6	101.3	104.0	309.9	935.2	Q
9	Czech Republic	Lucie Brázdová	104.3	103.4	104.7	312.4	934.3	
9	Czech Republic	Aneta Brabcová	103.8	105.0	102.5	311.3	934.3	
9	Czech Republic	Veronika Blažíčková	103.0	103.7	103.9	310.6	934.3	
10	Serbia	Teodora Vukojević	103.0	105.1	104.7	312.8	933.3	
10	Serbia	Ivana Maksimović	104.5	102.7	103.3	310.5	933.3	
10	Serbia	Andrea Arsović	102.2	103.9	103.9	310.0	933.3	
11	Denmark	Rikke Ibsen	104.0	105.4	105.1	314.5	929.9	
11	Denmark	Stephanie Grundsøe	103.3	104.3	104.4	312.0	929.9	
11	Denmark	Anna Nielsen	102.7	100.5	100.2	303.4	929.9	
12	Ukraine	Viktoriya Sukhorukova	104.7	105.0	103.5	313.2	929.7	
12	Ukraine	Daria Tykhova	104.0	104.1	103.5	311.6	929.7	
12	Ukraine	Natallia Kalnysh	100.5	101.2	103.2	304.9	929.7	

=== Qualification 2 ===
Rank	Country	Athlete	Series		Total	Team total	Notes
Rank	Country	Athlete	1	2	Total	Team total	Notes
1	Norway	Jeanette Hegg Duestad	105.7	105.8	211.5	629.7	QG
1	Norway	Milda Marina Haugen	105.0	104.8	209.8	629.7	QG
1	Norway	Jenny Stene	104.6	103.8	208.4	629.7	QG
2	Switzerland	Chiara Leone	105.3	104.3	209.6	628.5	QG
2	Switzerland	Nina Christen	103.9	105.6	209.5	628.5	QG
2	Switzerland	Audrey Gogniat	104.7	104.7	209.4	628.5	QG
3	Poland	Natalia Kochańska	104.2	105.2	209.4	626.6	QB
3	Poland	Aneta Stankiewicz	104.1	104.8	208.9	626.6	QB
3	Poland	Julia Piotrowska	104.5	103.8	208.3	626.6	QB
4	Hungary	Eszter Mészáros	104.4	104.9	209.3	626.5	QB
4	Hungary	Gitta Bajos	103.9	104.9	208.8	626.5	QB
4	Hungary	Eszter Dénes	105.1	103.3	208.4	626.5	QB
5	France	Océanne Muller	105.0	104.2	209.2	625.3	
5	France	Judith Gomez	104.6	104.3	208.9	625.3	
5	France	Jade Bordet	103.8	103.4	207.2	625.3	
6	Austria	Marlene Pribitzer	105.0	105.9	210.9	624.9	
6	Austria	Sheileen Waibel	104.2	104.2	208.4	624.9	
6	Austria	Nadine Ungerank	104.4	101.2	205.6	624.9	
7	Germany	Lisa Müller	105.6	105.1	210.7	624.3	
7	Germany	Anna Janssen	102.9	105.1	208.0	624.3	
7	Germany	Jolyn Beer	102.6	103.0	205.6	624.3	
8	Slovenia	Živa Dvoršak	104.4	104.8	209.2	624.1	
8	Slovenia	Urška Hrašovec	103.1	104.8	207.9	624.1	
8	Slovenia	Klavdija Jerovšek	102.5	104.5	207.0	624.1	

=== Finals ===
Rank	Country	Athletes	Total
Gold medal match
1st place, gold medalist(s)	Switzerland	Nina Christen; Audrey Gogniat; Chiara Leone	16
2nd place, silver medalist(s)	Norway	Jeanette Hegg Duestad; Milda Marina Haugen; Jenny Stene	14
Bronze medal match
3rd place, bronze medalist(s)	Poland	Natalia Kochańska; Julia Piotrowska; Aneta Stankiewicz	17
4	Hungary	Gitta Bajos; Eszter Dénes; Eszter Mészáros	5
