= Ski jumping at the 2023 European Games – Men's normal hill individual =

Men's normal hill individual at the 2023 European Games
- Venue: Średnia Krokiew, Zakopane
- Date: 29 June
- Competitors: 54 from 15 nations
- Winning points: 270.3

Medalists
gold medal	Daniel Tschofenig	Austria
silver medal	Jan Hörl	Austria
bronze medal	Gregor Deschwanden	Switzerland

The men's normal hill individual competition of the 2023 European Games, initially scheduled to 28 June, was held on 29 June, at the Średnia Krokiew hill in Zakopane.

== Competition format ==
The competition consists of two scored rounds. All entered athletes take part in the first round, the best thirty advances to the final round. The winner is the ski jumper with the most points total from both rounds.

== Results ==
The final was started at 9:30.

Rank	Bib	Name	Country	Round 1			Final round			Total
Rank	Bib	Name	Country	Distance (m)	Points	Rank	Distance (m)	Points	Rank	Points
1st place, gold medalist(s)	50	Daniel Tschofenig	Austria	104.0	136.0	1	104.5	134.3	1	270.3
2nd place, silver medalist(s)	48	Jan Hörl	Austria	101.0	128.4	3	104.5	134.3	1	262.7
3rd place, bronze medalist(s)	39	Gregor Deschwanden	Switzerland	107.0	130.6	2	101.5	127.4	8	258.0
4	37	Philipp Raimund	Germany	103.0	127.0	4	103.0	130.0	6	257.0
5	43	Marius Lindvik	Norway	100.0	124.4	5	101.5	130.3	5	254.7
6	42	Robert Johansson	Norway	101.0	122.0	7	105.0	128.8	7	250.8
7	52	Piotr Żyła	Poland	95.5	116.9	15	106.5	132.6	3	249.5
7	40	Constantin Schmid	Germany	99.0	119.0	9	102.5	130.5	4	249.5
9	51	Timi Zajc	Slovenia	98.5	121.9	8	100.5	122.0	12	243.9
10	53	Dawid Kubacki	Poland	95.5	116.9	15	101.0	124.9	9	241.8
11	29	Fatih Arda İpcioğlu	Turkey	101.0	123.0	6	97.5	116.8	19	239.8
12	46	Johann André Forfang	Norway	98.0	117.0	14	100.5	122.4	10	239.4
13	26	Felix Hoffmann	Germany	100.0	118.3	10	98.0	119.4	14	237.7
14	25	Markus Müller	Austria	99.0	115.8	18	99.0	120.2	13	236.0
15	33	Vladimir Zografski	Bulgaria	98.0	117.8	12	101.0	117.7	17	235.5
16	27	Vilho Palosaari	Finland	99.5	114.9	19	99.0	119.1	15	234.0
17	54	Anže Lanišek	Slovenia	94.5	109.7	23	98.0	122.3	11	232.0
18	49	Manuel Fettner	Austria	92.0	112.4	21	98.0	118.5	16	230.9
19	45	Žiga Jelar	Slovenia	96.0	116.0	17	97.0	114.1	21	230.1
20	24	Killian Peier	Switzerland	97.0	112.5	20	94.5	111.3	23	223.8
21	20	Luca Roth	Germany	100.5	118.0	11	93.5	105.1	27	223.1
22	47	Kamil Stoch	Poland	93.5	105.3	27	97.0	117.2	18	222.5
23	38	Kristoffer Eriksen Sundal	Norway	96.0	106.1	26	98.0	115.5	20	221.6
24	28	Eetu Nousiainen	Finland	97.0	110.5	22	95.0	108.8	24	221.3
25	32	Artti Aigro	Estonia	93.5	105.2	28	96.0	113.9	22	219.1
26	34	Niko Kytösaho	Finland	95.0	107.9	24	93.0	107.4	26	215.3
27	30	Kacper Juroszek	Poland	97.5	117.6	13	87.5	96.1	29	213.7
28	35	Bendik Jakobsen Heggli	Norway	90.5	105.2	28	92.5	108.2	25	213.4
29	41	Lovro Kos	Slovenia	95.0	106.2	25	92.0	103.6	28	209.8
30	17	Kasperi Valto	Finland	93.5	103.4	30	83.0	95.6	30	199.0
31	19	Muhammed Ali Bedir	Turkey	95.0	102.7	31	did not advance			
32	36	Aleksander Zniszczoł	Poland	93.0	102.2	32	did not advance			
33	31	Yevhen Marusiak	Ukraine	92.0	101.8	33	did not advance			
34	44	Domen Prevc	Slovenia	89.0	100.5	34	did not advance			
35	23	Daniel Cacina	Romania	92.5	99.9	35	did not advance			
36	7	Valentin Foubert	France	91.0	99.2	36	did not advance			
37	15	Hektor Kapustík	Slovakia	91.5	98.9	37	did not advance			
38	22	Radek Rýdl	Czech Republic	93.0	98.6	38	did not advance			
39	10	David Rygl	Czech Republic	90.0	95.4	39	did not advance			
40	14	Benedikt Holub	Czech Republic	89.5	92.7	40	did not advance			
41	1	Vitaliy Kalinichenko	Ukraine	86.5	90.9	41	did not advance			
42	4	Muhammet İrfan Çintımar	Turkey	85.0	90.1	42	did not advance			
43	18	Enzo Milesi	France	87.0	86.7	43	did not advance			
44	21	Kevin Maltsev	Estonia	89.0	86.1	44	did not advance			
45	9	Mihnea Spulber	Romania	84.0	83.4	45	did not advance			
46	11	Ari Reppelin	France	85.5	83.2	46	did not advance			
47	5	Jules Chervet	France	84.0	82.8	47	did not advance			
48	6	Andrei Feldorean	Romania	82.5	79.9	48	did not advance			
49	8	Kryštof Hauser	Czech Republic	81.0	72.0	49	did not advance			
50	16	Alessandro Batby	France	68.5	44.2	50	did not advance			
	2	Kaimar Vagul	Estonia	Not permitted to start						
	3	Sorin Mitrofan	Romania	Not permitted to start						
	12	Andero Kapp	Estonia	Not permitted to start						
	13	Daniel Škarka	Czech Republic	Not permitted to start						
