= Ski jumping at the 2023 European Games – Women's normal hill individual =

Women's normal hill individual at the 2023 European Games
- Venue: Średnia Krokiew, Zakopane
- Date: 27 June
- Competitors: 37 from 12 nations
- Winning points: 262.6

Medalists
| gold medal | Jacqueline Seifriedsberger | Austria |
| silver medal | Nika Prevc | Slovenia |
| bronze medal | Marita Kramer | Austria |

The Women's normal hill individual competition of the 2023 European Games was held on 27 June, at the Średnia Krokiew hill in Zakopane.

== Competition format ==
The competition consists of two scored rounds. All entered athletes take part in the first round, the best thirty advances to the final round. The winner is the ski jumper with the most points total from both rounds.

== Results ==
The final was started at 17:35.

| Rank | Bib | Name | Country | Round 1 | | | Final round | | | Total |
| Rank | Bib | Name | Country | Distance (m) | Points | Rank | Distance (m) | Points | Rank | Points |
|---|---|---|---|---|---|---|---|---|---|---|
| 1st place, gold medalist(s) | 27 | Jacqueline Seifriedsberger | Austria | 99.0 | 133.7 | 1 | 98.5 | 128.9 | 2 | 262.6 |
| 2nd place, silver medalist(s) | 28 | Nika Prevc | Slovenia | 97.5 | 133.2 | 2 | 100.5 | 129.1 | 1 | 262.3 |
| 3rd place, bronze medalist(s) | 31 | Marita Kramer | Austria | 100.0 | 124.3 | 3 | 93.5 | 118.3 | 6 | 242.6 |
| 4 | 33 | Nika Križnar | Slovenia | 93.0 | 115.1 | 7 | 98.0 | 123.5 | 3 | 238.6 |
| 5 | 18 | Katra Komar | Slovenia | 93.5 | 117.7 | 5 | 95.5 | 119.1 | 5 | 236.8 |
| 6 | 34 | Chiara Kreuzer | Austria | 91.0 | 112.2 | 9 | 97.0 | 121.8 | 4 | 234.0 |
| 7 | 24 | Eirin Maria Kvandal | Norway | 95.5 | 115.3 | 6 | 93.0 | 112.8 | 8 | 228.1 |
| 8 | 35 | Selina Freitag | Germany | 90.0 | 115.1 | 7 | 94.0 | 112.8 | 8 | 227.9 |
| 9 | 36 | Anna Odine Strøm | Norway | 92.5 | 118.8 | 4 | 85.0 | 107.8 | 12 | 226.6 |
| 10 | 32 | Thea Minyan Bjørseth | Norway | 92.0 | 102.6 | 13 | 91.0 | 118.2 | 7 | 220.8 |
| 11 | 30 | Joséphine Pagnier | France | 91.0 | 108.8 | 10 | 89.5 | 108.1 | 11 | 216.9 |
| 12 | 23 | Jenny Rautionaho | Finland | 86.0 | 106.1 | 11 | 92.0 | 107.2 | 14 | 213.3 |
| 13 | 22 | Julia Mühlbacher | Austria | 85.5 | 103.8 | 12 | 90.0 | 107.8 | 12 | 211.6 |
| 14 | 37 | Katharina Schmid | Germany | 85.5 | 96.1 | 15 | 94.0 | 111.5 | 10 | 207.6 |
| 15 | 19 | Maja Vtič | Slovenia | 84.5 | 99.2 | 14 | 89.0 | 103.7 | 17 | 202.9 |
| 16 | 29 | Anna Rupprecht | Germany | 83.0 | 91.9 | 18 | 86.0 | 105.7 | 16 | 197.6 |
| 17 | 17 | Hannah Wiegele | Austria | 79.5 | 91.0 | 20 | 91.0 | 106.3 | 15 | 197.3 |
| 18 | 26 | Julia Clair | France | 88.0 | 95.5 | 16 | 86.0 | 94.3 | 20 | 189.8 |
| 19 | 15 | Ajda Košnjek | Slovenia | 81.0 | 92.8 | 17 | 85.0 | 96.9 | 19 | 189.7 |
| 20 | 21 | Pauline Heßler | Germany | 81.0 | 84.4 | 24 | 86.0 | 98.0 | 18 | 182.4 |
| 21 | 20 | Daniela Haralambie | Romania | 84.0 | 91.3 | 19 | 80.5 | 88.8 | 21 | 180.1 |
| 22 | 25 | Luisa Görlich | Germany | 83.5 | 90.4 | 22 | 83.0 | 84.0 | 23 | 174.4 |
| 23 | 16 | Sina Arnet | Switzerland | 76.5 | 85.0 | 23 | 79.5 | 82.5 | 24 | 167.5 |
| 24 | 10 | Klára Ulrichová | Czech Republic | 86.0 | 90.8 | 21 | 76.5 | 76.5 | 25 | 167.3 |
| 25 | 6 | Anna Twardosz | Poland | 76.0 | 75.4 | 27 | 84.0 | 84.7 | 22 | 160.1 |
| 26 | 9 | Pola Bełtowska | Poland | 75.0 | 79.1 | 26 | 71.0 | 75.6 | 26 | 154.7 |
| 27 | 14 | Karolína Indráčková | Czech Republic | 73.0 | 82.3 | 25 | 70.0 | 59.2 | 30 | 141.5 |
| 28 | 7 | Anežka Indráčková | Czech Republic | 75.5 | 72.2 | 28 | 72.0 | 67.1 | 29 | 139.3 |
| 29 | 13 | Nicole Konderla | Poland | 72.0 | 67.6 | 29 | 72.0 | 71.5 | 27 | 139.1 |
| 30 | 8 | Emma Chervet | France | 72.0 | 67.5 | 30 | 72.5 | 68.0 | 28 | 135.5 |
| 31 | 11 | Paulina Cieślar | Poland | 72.5 | 66.6 | 31 | did not advance | | | |
| 32 | 1 | Tamara Mesíková | Slovakia | 67.5 | 61.5 | 32 | did not advance | | | |
| 33 | 4 | Wiktoria Przybyła | Poland | 69.0 | 56.4 | 33 | did not advance | | | |
| 34 | 3 | Tetiana Pylypchuk | Ukraine | 67.0 | 55.6 | 34 | did not advance | | | |
| 35 | 2 | Zhanna Hlukhova | Ukraine | 63.5 | 35.8 | 35 | did not advance | | | |
| 36 | 5 | Delia Folea | Romania | 59.0 | 28.6 | 36 | did not advance | | | |
| | 12 | Kjersti Græsli | Norway | Not permitted to start | | | did not advance | | | |
