= Ski jumping at the 2023 European Games – Women's large hill individual =

Women's large hill individual at the 2023 European Games
- Venue: Wielka Krokiew, Zakopane
- Date: 30 June
- Competitors: 38 from 12 nations
- Winning points: 277.4

Medalists
gold medal	Nika Križnar	Slovenia
silver medal	Nika Prevc	Slovenia
bronze medal	Selina Freitag	Germany

The Women's large hill individual competition of the 2023 European Games was held on 30 June, at the Wielka Krokiew hill in Zakopane.

== Competition format ==
The competition consists of two scored rounds. All entered athletes take part in the first round, the best thirty advances to the final round. The winner is the ski jumper with the most points total from both rounds.

== Results ==
The final was started at 17:35.

Rank	Bib	Name	Country	Round 1			Final round			Total
Rank	Bib	Name	Country	Distance (m)	Points	Rank	Distance (m)	Points	Rank	Points
1st place, gold medalist(s)	34	Nika Križnar	Slovenia	137.5	135.0	1	132.0	142.4	1	277.4
2nd place, silver medalist(s)	29	Nika Prevc	Slovenia	130.0	122.2	2	125.5	126.0	4	248.2
3rd place, bronze medalist(s)	36	Selina Freitag	Germany	126.5	115.6	4	130.5	130.2	2	245.8
4	28	Jacqueline Seifriedsberger	Austria	128.0	113.5	5	130.0	127.4	3	240.9
5	35	Chiara Kreuzer	Austria	128.5	117.9	3	123.5	119.7	5	237.6
6	25	Eirin Maria Kvandal	Norway	124.5	113.2	6	127.0	115.7	7	228.9
7	24	Jenny Rautionaho	Finland	123.5	108.4	8	126.0	118.6	6	227.0
8	32	Marita Kramer	Austria	129.0	111.9	7	124.0	110.2	8	222.1
9	38	Katharina Schmid	Germany	118.0	96.5	11	126.0	110.0	9	206.5
10	31	Joséphine Pagnier	France	117.5	94.5	12	124.5	105.6	10	200.1
11	30	Anna Rupprecht	Germany	119.0	97.5	10	117.0	100.0	14	197.5
12	23	Julia Mühlbacher	Austria	119.0	93.8	13	124.0	103.0	11	196.8
13	19	Katra Komar	Slovenia	124.0	105.5	9	112.0	88.5	18	194.4
14	33	Thea Minyan Bjørseth	Norway	112.5	84.9	15	122.0	101.0	13	185.9
15	37	Anna Odine Strøm	Norway	109.0	82.4	18	124.0	103.0	11	185.4
16	22	Pauline Heßler	Germany	115.5	83.1	17	122.0	99.5	15	182.6
17	16	Ajda Košnjek	Slovenia	114.5	88.2	14	119.0	91.0	17	179.2
18	20	Maja Vtič	Slovenia	113.5	83.3	16	114.5	86.6	20	169.9
19	14	Nicole Konderla	Poland	107.5	74.9	20	115.5	92.2	16	167.1
20	17	Sina Arnet	Switzerland	107.5	74.5	21	113.5	86.7	19	161.2
21	18	Hannah Wiegele	Austria	111.0	80.3	19	110.0	75.1	24	155.4
22	12	Kjersti Græsli	Norway	103.5	68.0	24	114.5	86.5	21	154.5
23	27	Julia Clair	France	106.0	69.9	23	112.0	83.7	22	153.6
24	21	Daniela Haralambie	Romania	107.5	67.3	25	109.0	76.7	23	144.0
25	10	Klára Ulrichová	Czech Republic	105.0	70.6	22	105.5	70.0	26	140.6
26	13	Emely Torazza	Switzerland	98.5	57.7	28	105.0	73.8	25	131.5
27	26	Luisa Görlich	Germany	101.0	61.0	26	104.0	69.3	27	130.3
28	15	Karolína Indráčková	Czech Republic	99.5	59.3	27	101.0	64.5	28	123.8
29	4	Anna Twardosz	Poland	94.5	55.2	29	98.0	63.3	29	118.5
30	7	Tamara Mesíková	Slovakia	94.5	55.0	30	93.5	52.6	30	107.6
31	2	Anežka Indráčková	Czech Republic	94.5	51.7	31	did not advance			
32	11	Paulina Cieślar	Poland	90.5	44.8	32	did not advance			
33	9	Pola Bełtowska	Poland	91.0	43.3	33	did not advance			
34	8	Emma Chervet	France	89.0	42.2	34	did not advance			
35	3	Wiktoria Przybyła	Poland	84.5	30.8	35	did not advance			
36	1	Alessia Mîțu-Coșca	Romania	82.5	23.6	36	did not advance			
37	5	Tetiana Pylypchuk	Ukraine	78.0	22.5	37	did not advance			
38	6	Delia Folea	Romania	77.5	15.8	38	did not advance			
