= Ski jumping at the 2023 European Games =

- Venue: Średnia Krokiew & Wielka Krokiew
- Dates: 27 June – 1 July
- Competitors: 94 from 15 nations

Ski jumping at the 2023 European Games took place between 27 June and 1 July 2023. A total of five events were held.

== Competition schedule ==
The following was the competition schedule for the five ski jumping events.

All times are local, CEST (UTC+2).

| Date | Time | Event |
|---|---|---|
| 27 June | 17:30 | Women's individual normal hill |
| 29 June | 09:30 | Men's individual normal hill |
| 29 June | 17:30 | Mixed team |
| 30 June | 17:30 | Women's individual large hill |
| 1 July | 17:30 | Men's individual large hill |

== Medal summary ==
=== Medal table ===
* Host nation (Poland)

| Rank | Nation | Gold | Silver | Bronze | Total |
|---|---|---|---|---|---|
| 1 | Austria | 3 | 2 | 1 | 6 |
| 2 | Slovenia | 1 | 2 | 1 | 4 |
| 3 | Poland* | 1 | 0 | 0 | 1 |
| 4 | Norway | 0 | 1 | 0 | 1 |
| 5 | Germany | 0 | 0 | 2 | 2 |
| 6 | Switzerland | 0 | 0 | 1 | 1 |
| Totals (6 entries) | | 5 | 5 | 5 | 15 |

=== Medalists ===
| Event | Gold | | Silver | | Bronze | |
|---|---|---|---|---|---|---|
| Men's normal hill individual | Daniel Tschofenig; Austria | 270.3 | Jan Hörl; Austria | 262.7 | Gregor Deschwanden; Switzerland | 258.0 |
| Men's large hill individual | Dawid Kubacki; Poland | 279.1 | Jan Hörl; Austria | 273.0 | Philipp Raimund; Germany | 271.8 |
| Women's normal hill individual | Jacqueline Seifriedsberger; Austria | 262.6 | Nika Prevc; Slovenia | 262.3 | Marita Kramer; Austria | 242.6 |
| Women's large hill individual | Nika Križnar; Slovenia | 277.4 | Nika Prevc; Slovenia | 248.2 | Selina Freitag; Germany | 245.8 |
| Mixed normal hill team | Austria; Marita Kramer; Jan Hörl; Jacqueline Seifriedsberger; Daniel Tschofenig | 939.3 | Norway; Anna Odine Strøm; Robert Johansson; Eirin Maria Kvandal; Marius Lindvik | 876.7 | Slovenia; Nika Prevc; Timi Zajc; Nika Križnar; Anže Lanišek | 872.0 |

== Participating nations ==
Each nation was represented by a maximum of five athletes in an individual event and by one team in the team event.

| NOC | Men | Women | Total |
|---|---|---|---|
| Austria | 4 | 5 | 9 |
| Bulgaria | 1 | | 1 |
| Czech Republic | 5 | 3 | 8 |
| Estonia | 4 | | 4 |
| Finland | 4 | 1 | 5 |
| France | 5 | 3 | 8 |
| Germany | 4 | 5 | 9 |
| Norway | 5 | 4 | 9 |
| Poland | 6 | 5 | 11 |
| Romania | 4 | 3 | 7 |
| Slovakia | 1 | 1 | 2 |
| Slovenia | 5 | 5 | 10 |
| Switzerland | 2 | 2 | 4 |
| Turkey | 3 | | 3 |
| Ukraine | 2 | 2 | 4 |
| Total: 15 NOCs | 55 | 39 | 94 |
