= Gülistan Turan =

Turkish Muay Thai practitioner (born 1997)

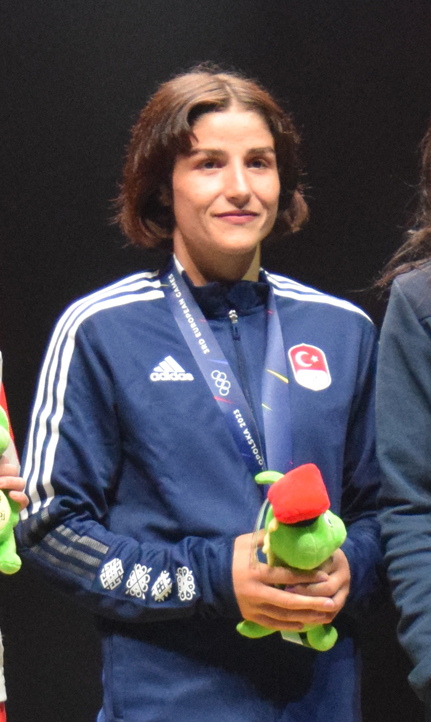
- Turan at the 2023 European Games
- Born: 14 January 1997 (age 29); Kayseri, Turkey
- Nationality: Turkish
- Division: 51 kg (formerly 48 kg)
- Style: Kickboxing, Muay Thai
- Stance: Orthodox
- Team: Güven Spor Kulübü
- Trainer: Yücel Haspolat

Kickboxing record
- Total: 4
- Wins: 4
- By knockout: 1
- Losses: 0

Gülistan Turan
Medal record

Representing Turkey

Women's Muay Thai

IFMA World Championships
Gold medal – first place	2024 Patras	51 kg
Gold medal – first place	2023 Bangkok	51 kg
Bronze medal – third place	2022 Abu Dhabi	51 kg
Bronze medal – third place	2019 Bangkok	48 kg

European Games
Gold medal – first place	2023 Myślenice	51 kg

European Championship
Gold medal – first place	2024 Pristina	51 kg

Gülistan Turan (born 14 January 1997) is a Turkish Muay Thai practitioner competing in the 51 kg division. She is a world and European Games champion.

== Personal life ==
Born on 14 January 1997, Gülistan Turan is a native of Kayseri, Turkey.

== Sport career ==
She was Turkish Seniors champion in the −48 kg in 2020 (3 wins), and Turkish Elite champion in the −51 kg in 2022 (3 wins). She won the bronze medal in the 48 kg class at the 2019 IFMA World Muaythai Championships in Bangkok, Thailand. In May 2023, she became champion in the 51 kg class of the IFMA World Championships in Bangkok, Thailand defeating her Spanish opponent by knockout in the 20th second of the first round.

Turan received the bronze medal in the Elite Senior 51 kg event at the 2022 IFMA World Muaythai Championships held in Abu Dhabi, United Arab Emirates.

At the 2023 European Games in Myślenice, Poland, she won the gold medal in the 51 kg (3 wins).

She captured the gold medal in the Elite Senior 51 kg event at the 2024 IFMA World Muaythai Championships in Patras, Greece. At the 2024 European Championships in Pristina, Kosovo, she won the gold medal in the 51 kg division.

== Fight record ==
Kickboxing record
4 Wins (1 (T)KO), 0 Losses, 1 Draw
Date	Result	Opponent	Event	Location	Method	Round	Time
2022-12-18	Win	(Iran) Atafeh Mohammadi	Golden Night	Mersin, Turkey	Decision (Unanimous)	5	3:00
2022-03-31	Win	(Turkey) Tuğbanur Kivrak	NFC Night Club	Aksaray, Turkey	TKO (Cut)	3	
Legend: Win Loss Draw/No contest Notes
