= Muaythai at the 2023 European Games – Women's 51 kg =

Muaythai competition

Women's 51 kg at the 2023 European Games
- Venue: Myślenice Arena
- Date: 25–28 June
- Competitors: 8 from 8 nations

Medalists
gold medal	Gülistan Turan	Turkey
silver medal	Roksana Dargiel	Poland
bronze medal	Myriame Djedidi	France
bronze medal	Anastasiia Mykhailenko	Ukraine

Women's 51 kg competition at the Muaythai at the 2023 European Games in Kraków, Poland, took place on 25–28 June at the Myślenice Arena.

== Results ==
Quarterfinals
Myriame Djedidi (FRA)	30
Claudia Perona Roca (ESP)	27
Gülistan Turan (TUR)	30
Monika Chochlíková (SVK)	27
Rebecca Hödl (AUT)	27
Roksana Dargiel (POL)	30
Jessica Meloni (ITA)	27
Anastasiia Mykhailenko (UKR)	30

Semifinals
Myriame Djedidi (FRA)	27
Gülistan Turan (TUR)	30
Roksana Dargiel (POL)	29
Anastasiia Mykhailenko (UKR)	28

Final
Gülistan Turan (TUR)	30
Roksana Dargiel (POL)	27
