= Teqball at the 2023 European Games =

- Venue: Main Square, Kraków
- Dates: 28 June – 1 July
- Competitors: 69 from 21 nations

Five teqball events at the 2023 European Games were held at the Main Square in Kraków, Poland, from 28 June to 1 July 2023. This was the first appearance of teqball at the European Games.

== Medal table ==
* Host nation (Poland)

Rank	Nation	Gold	Silver	Bronze	Total
1	Hungary	3	0	0	3
2	Romania	2	1	0	3
3	Serbia	0	2	0	2
4	Poland*	0	1	3	4
5	France	0	1	1	2
6	Denmark	0	0	1	1
Totals (6 entries)		5	5	5	15

== Medalists ==
Event	Gold	Silver	Bronze
Men's singles	Apor Györgydeák; Romania	Adrian Duszak; Poland	Hugo Rabeux; France
Women's singles	Kinga Barabási; Romania	Amélie Julian; France	Nanna Lind Kristensen; Denmark
Men's doubles	Hungary; Csaba Bányik; Balázs Katz	Serbia; Bogdan Marojević; Nikola Mitro	Poland; Adrian Duszak; Marek Pokwap
Women's doubles	Hungary; Zsanett Janicsek; Lea Vasas	Romania; Katalin Dako; Kinga Barabási	Poland; Alicja Bartnicka; Ewa Kamińska
Mixed doubles	Hungary; Balázs Katz; Lea Vasas	Serbia; Nikola Mitro; Maja Umićević	Poland; Marek Pokwap; Alicja Bartnicka

== Participating nations ==
NOC	Men's singles	Men's doubles	Women's singles	Women's doubles	Mixed doubles	Athletes
Albania	X					1
Armenia	X	X	X		X	3
Austria	X	X	X	X	X	4
Croatia	X	X	X	X	X	4
Czech Republic	X	X	X	X	X	4
Denmark	X	X	X	X	X	4
France	X	X	X	X	X	4
Germany	X	X	X	X	X	4
Hungary	X	X	X	X	X	4
Italy	X	X	X		X	3
Kosovo	X	X				2
Lithuania	X					1
Moldova	X	X	X	X	X	4
Montenegro	X	X				2
North Macedonia	X					1
Poland	X	X	X	X	X	4
Portugal	X	X	X	X	X	4
Romania	X	X	X	X	X	4
Serbia	X	X	X	X	X	4
Slovakia	X	X	X	X	X	4
Ukraine	X	X	X	X	X	4
Total: 21 NOCs	21	18	16	15	16	69
