= Ski jumping at the 2023 European Games – Men's large hill individual =

Men's large hill individual at the 2023 European Games
- Venue: Wielka Krokiew, Zakopane
- Date: 1 July
- Competitors: 54 from 15 nations
- Winning points: 279.1

Medalists
gold medal	Dawid Kubacki	Poland
silver medal	Jan Hörl	Austria
bronze medal	Philipp Raimund	Germany

The men's large hill individual competition of the 2023 European Games was held on 1 July, at the Wielka Krokiew hill in Zakopane.

== Competition format ==
The competition consists of two scored rounds. All entered athletes take part in the first round, the best thirty advances to the final round. The winner is the ski jumper with the most points total from both rounds.

== Results ==
The final was started at 17:30.

Rank	Bib	Name	Country	Round 1			Final round			Total
Rank	Bib	Name	Country	Distance (m)	Points	Rank	Distance (m)	Points	Rank	Points
1st place, gold medalist(s)	53	Dawid Kubacki	Poland	139.0	139.4	2	134.5	139.7	1	279.1
2nd place, silver medalist(s)	48	Jan Hörl	Austria	140.0	140.5	1	130.0	132.5	5	273.0
3rd place, bronze medalist(s)	37	Philipp Raimund	Germany	138.0	138.6	3	132.5	133.2	4	271.8
4	50	Daniel Tschofenig	Austria	130.5	130.7	8	134.0	136.2	2	269.9
5	43	Marius Lindvik	Norway	134.5	133.2	5	133.0	130.7	7	263.9
6	54	Anže Lanišek	Slovenia	133.0	127.9	10	136.0	135.3	3	263.2
7	52	Piotr Żyła	Poland	136.5	135.8	4	130.0	126.4	8	262.2
8	42	Robert Johansson	Norway	134.0	132.9	6	131.0	125.4	9	258.3
9	29	Fatih Arda İpcioğlu	Turkey	127.0	123.1	14	138.0	131.1	6	254.2
10	35	Aleksander Zniszczoł	Poland	136.0	132.9	6	127.5	115.7	17	248.6
11	39	Gregor Deschwanden	Switzerland	131.0	128.9	9	126.0	115.1	18	244.0
12	34	Bendik Jakobsen Heggli	Norway	132.0	123.6	13	130.0	114.9	20	238.5
13	30	Yevhen Marusiak	Ukraine	126.0	121.8	17	124.0	116.3	16	238.1
14	51	Timi Zajc	Slovenia	121.5	114.1	27	134.5	123.6	11	237.7
15	49	Manuel Fettner	Austria	127.0	122.2	16	123.0	115.0	19	237.2
15	36	Paweł Wąsek	Poland	130.0	125.1	12	127.0	112.1	23	237.2
17	26	Felix Hoffmann	Germany	123.5	114.0	28	133.5	122.3	12	236.3
18	28	Eetu Nousiainen	Finland	120.5	111.6	30	135.0	123.9	10	235.5
19	40	Constantin Schmid	Germany	130.5	125.2	11	126.5	109.6	26	234.8
20	24	Killian Peier	Switzerland	122.5	116.1	25	131.0	117.0	14	233.1
21	33	Niko Kytösaho	Finland	125.5	113.2	29	133.0	119.7	13	232.9
22	44	Domen Prevc	Slovenia	128.0	122.6	15	124.5	109.9	25	232.5
23	15	Hektor Kapustík	Slovakia	125.0	119.1	20	126.5	113.3	22	232.4
24	46	Johann André Forfang	Norway	126.0	117.9	23	126.5	113.7	21	231.6
25	45	Žiga Jelar	Slovenia	125.5	114.3	26	131.0	117.0	14	231.3
26	20	Luca Roth	Germany	126.5	121.2	18	121.0	109.1	27	230.3
27	31	Artti Aigro	Estonia	125.5	120.5	19	122.0	108.2	28	228.7
28	38	Kristoffer Eriksen Sundal	Norway	129.0	117.4	24	126.5	111.1	24	228.5
29	47	Kamil Stoch	Poland	127.0	118.4	22	122.5	106.9	29	225.3
30	27	Vilho Palosaari	Finland	124.5	118.5	21	121.5	104.1	30	222.6
31	41	Lovro Kos	Slovenia	124.0	111.3	31	did not advance			
32	19	Muhammed Ali Bedir	Turkey	120.0	107.5	32	did not advance			
33	25	Markus Müller	Austria	118.0	106.5	33	did not advance			
34	11	Vitaliy Kalinichenko	Ukraine	118.0	106.3	34	did not advance			
35	32	Vladimir Zografski	Bulgaria	120.5	106.1	35	did not advance			
36	17	Kasperi Valto	Finland	119.0	106.0	36	did not advance			
37	7	Valentin Foubert	France	122.5	101.9	37	did not advance			
38	22	Radek Rýdl	Czech Republic	115.0	100.4	38	did not advance			
39	23	Daniel Cacina	Romania	116.0	95.8	39	did not advance			
40	9	Kaimar Vagul	Estonia	115.5	94.5	40	did not advance			
41	2	David Rygl	Czech Republic	118.5	90.1	41	did not advance			
42	18	Enzo Milesi	France	111.5	88.9	42	did not advance			
43	3	Mihnea Spulber	Romania	120.0	88.4	43	did not advance			
44	12	Jules Chervet	France	108.5	84.4	44	did not advance			
45	6	Sorin Mitrofan	Romania	114.5	83.9	45	did not advance			
46	21	Kevin Maltsev	Estonia	107.5	82.3	46	did not advance			
46	13	Ari Reppelin	France	104.5	82.3	46	did not advance			
48	8	Muhammet İrfan Çintımar	Turkey	110.0	78.4	48	did not advance			
49	14	Benedikt Holub	Czech Republic	102.0	72.5	49	did not advance			
50	16	Alessandro Batby	France	103.0	69.8	50	did not advance			
51	5	Andero Kapp	Estonia	105.5	65.8	51	did not advance			
52	1	Andrei Feldorean	Romania	107.0	63.6	52	did not advance			
53	10	Daniel Škarka	Czech Republic	99.5	60.3	53	did not advance			
54	4	Kryštof Hauser	Czech Republic	101.5	59.8	54	did not advance			
