= Muaythai at the 2023 European Games – Men's 71 kg =

Muaythai competition

Men's 71 kg at the 2023 European Games
- Venue: Myślenice Arena
- Date: 25–28 June
- Competitors: 8 from 8 nations

Medalists
gold medal	Oleksandr Yefimenko	Ukraine
silver medal	Gonçalo Noite	Portugal
bronze medal	Messie Kubila	France
bronze medal	Jakub Rajewski	Poland

Men's 71 kg competition at the Muaythai at the 2023 European Games in Kraków, Poland, took place on 25–28 June at the Myślenice Arena.

== Results ==
Quarterfinals
Jakub Rajewski (POL)	29
Mahabbat Humbatov (AZE)	28
Gonçalo Noite (POR)	30
Rasmus Petri Eriksson (SWE)	27
Alein Iannone (ITA)	27
Oleksandr Yefimenko (UKR)	30
Armen Grigoryan (ARM)	27
Messie Kubila (FRA)	30

Semifinals
Jakub Rajewski (POL)	27
Gonçalo Noite (POR)	30
Oleksandr Yefimenko (UKR)	30
Messie Kubila (FRA)	28

Final
Gonçalo Noite (POR)	27
Oleksandr Yefimenko (UKR)	30
