= Julia Hauser =

Austrian triathlete (born 1994)

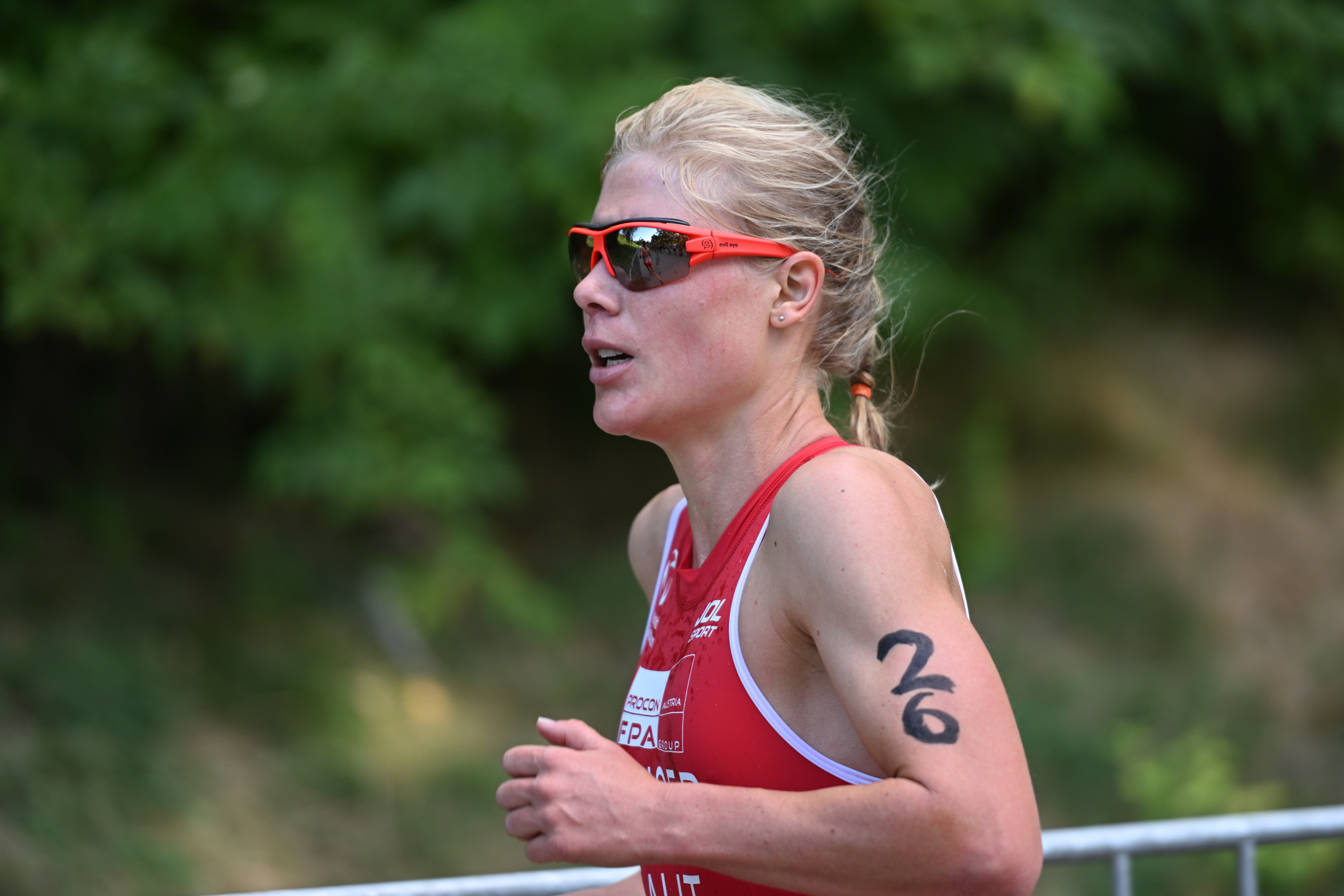

Personal information
- Born: 21 February 1994 (age 32) Vienna, Austria

Sport
- Sport: Triathlon
Medal record
Women's triathlon
Representing Austria
European Games
Silver medal – second place	2023 Kraków-Małopolska	Individual

Julia Hauser (born 21 February 1994) is an Austrian triathlete. She competed in the women's event at the 2016 Summer Olympics. In 2021, she competed in the women's event at the 2020 Summer Olympics held in Tokyo, Japan, but did not finish. She was also scheduled to compete in the mixed relay event but the Austrian team did not start. In June 2023 she finished second in the women's event at the European Games in Poland.

She competed in the women's triathlon at the 2024 Summer Olympics in Paris, France.
