= Marlene Pribitzer =

Austrian sport shooter (born 1997)

Personal information
- Citizenship: Austrian
- Born: Marlene Pribitzer; January 16, 1997 (age 28) Vienna, Austria
- Home town: Matzen, Austria
- Occupation: Sport Shooter
- Height: 174 cm (5 ft 9 in)
- Weight: 70 kg (154 lb)

Sport
- Country: Austria
- Sport: Shooting
- Event: 10 meter air rifle
- Club: OMV SG Prottes; USG Altach; SG Hohenems
- Coached by: Wolfram Waibel

Marlene Pribitzer (born 16 January 1997) is an Austrian sports shooter. She has represented Austria in ISSF Air Rifle at European and World Championship level. Pribitzer competes for Mertingen Schützen in the German Bundesliga.

== Early life ==
Pribitzer started shooting with her father at OMV SG Prottes club in Lower Austria. She started shooting from a sitting position at the age of three. By age 12 she progressed to standing in order to compete. She attended her first Austrian Championships in 2011, placing fourth in her category. By 2014 she was invited to compete in the Austrian Junior National Cup and was selected to represent Austria at the ISSF World Championships in Granada, placing 38th in the Junior Women's Air Rifle match.

In 2017, Pribitzer was selected for the ISSF Junior Championships in Suhl. She placed 31st in the 50m Prone Rifle and 56th in the 10m Air Rifle.

== Senior career ==
In 2016, Pribitzer joined the Austrian Armed Forces. This allowed her to train full time in Vorarlberg under national coach Wolfram Waibel.

In 2023, Pribitzer won her first national title in the inter-state team match competing for Vorarlberg with Sheileen Waibel and Yvonne Klocker.

Pribitzer competed for FSG Titting in the DSB Bundesliga in Germany, but moved to the Mertingen Schützen team in 2023.
