= Natalia Kochańska =

Polish sport shooter (born 1996)

Personal information
- Born: 18 August 1996 (age 29) Zielona Góra, Poland
- Height: 169 cm (5 ft 7 in)

Sport
- Club: Gwardia Zielona Góra
Medal record
Women's shooting
Representing Poland
European Games
Silver medal – second place	2023 Kraków-Małopolska	50 m rifle 3 position
FISU World University Games
Gold medal – first place	2019 Naples	10 m air rifle team

Natalia Kochańska (born 18 August 1996 in Zielona Góra) is a Polish sport shooter specializing in rifle shooting, bronze medalist at the European Championships, and Universiade champion.

== Biography ==
Initially, she practiced swimming but switched to shooting due to her anatomical build. She started shooting in primary school. After graduating from the I High School in Zielona Góra, she moved to Wrocław to study finance and accounting at the Wrocław University of Economics. In June 2016, she transferred to the University of Warsaw, continuing her studies in finance, accounting, and insurance.

In 2019, she became the Universiade champion in Naples in the team air rifle event, with teammates Katarzyna Komorowska and Aneta Stankiewicz. Individually, she placed 27th with a score of 622.1 points.

The following year, she won a bronze medal at the European Championships held in Wrocław in the team the 10m air rifle event, alongside Aneta Stankiewicz and Agnieszka Nagay. They defeated the French team 16–8 in the third-place match.
