= Philipp Raimund =

German ski jumper (born 2000)

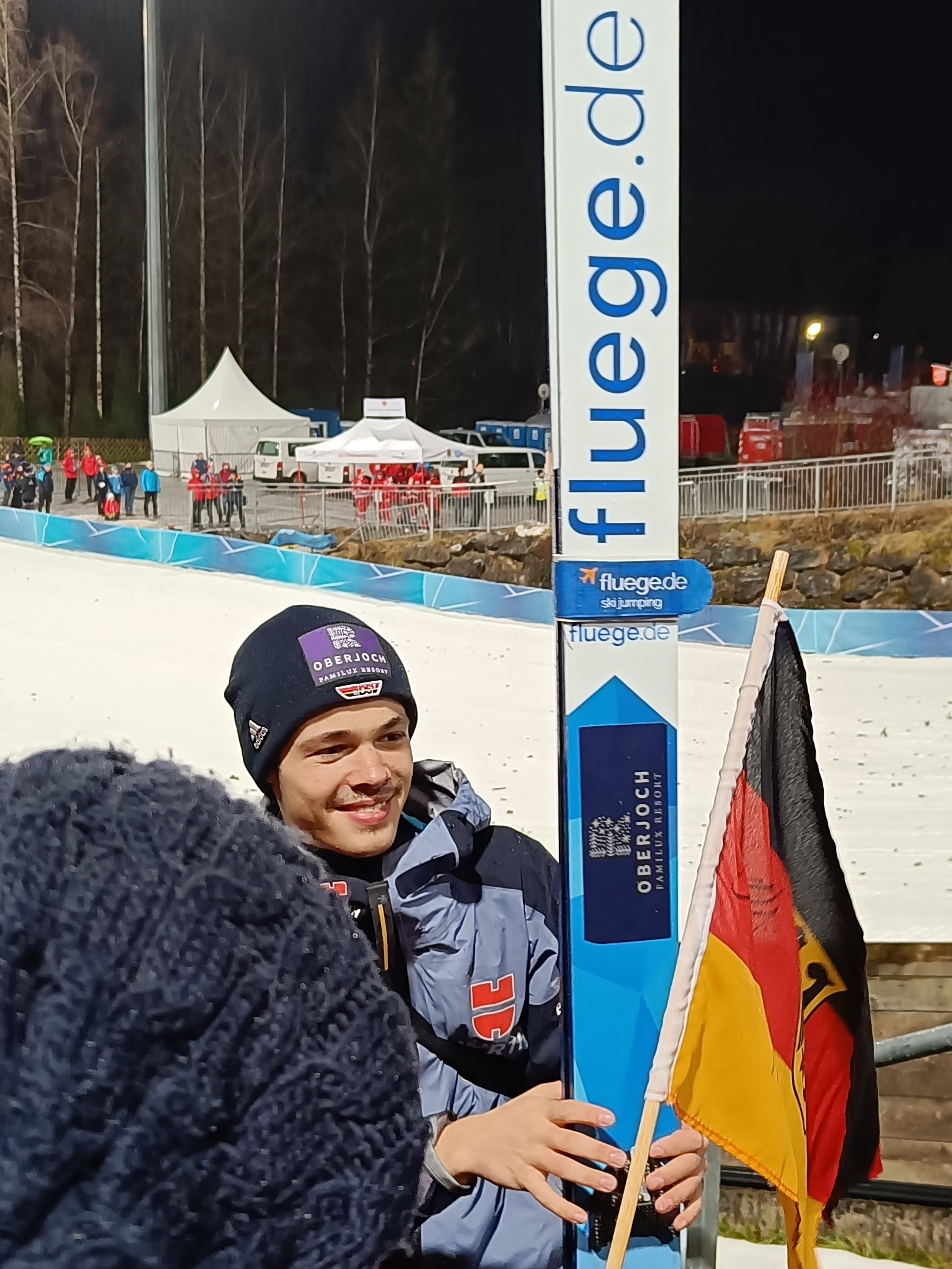
- Raimund in 2023

Personal information
- Nationality: German
- Born: 23 June 2000 (age 26) Göppingen, Germany

Sport
- Sport: Skiing
- Club: SC 1906 Oberstdorf

World Cup career
- Seasons: 2019–present
- Indiv. starts: 80
- Indiv. podiums: 4
- Team starts: 6
- Team podiums: 5
- Team wins: 1

Achievements and titles
- Personal bests: 225.5 m (740 ft); Vikersund, 21 March 2026
Medal record
Men's ski jumping
Representing Germany
Olympic Games
Gold medal – first place	2026 Milano Cortina	Individual NH
European Games
Bronze medal – third place	2023 Kraków–Małopolska	Individual LH
- Updated on 21 March 2026

Philipp Raimund (born 23 June 2000) is a German ski jumper and representative of the club SC 1906 Oberstdorf. He won a bronze medal in large hill competition at the 2023 European Games, and gold at the 2026 Winter Olympics in the normal hill event.

== Career ==
Raimund made his debut in the Alpen Cup competition in 2015. In January 2017, in his first start in the FIS Cup, he took 7th place in the large hill competition in Zakopane. He took part in the 2018 Nordic Junior World Ski Championships and won the gold medal in the team competition (with Justin Lisso, Cedrik Weigel and Constantin Schmid). During the competition on 4 March 2018, he scored his first points in the Continental Cup, taking 21st place. At the 2019 World Junior Championships, he again won the gold medal in the men's team (with Luca Roth, Kilian Märkl and Constantin Schmid).

On 29 December 2019, he made his debut in the World Cup, taking 34th place in the competition in Oberstdorf held as part of the 68th Four Hills Tournament. He finished the tournament in 50th place. At the 2020 World Junior Championships, he won a bronze medal in the men's team. In the individual competition he finished 7th, and in the mixed team he took 4th place.

On 22 January 2022, Raimund took 27th place in the World Cup competition in Titisee-Neustadt, thus gaining his first career points at the highest level. A day later he took 19th place. A day later, he improved his best result, taking 19th place.

On 11 December 2022, Raimund achieved his first victory in the Continental Cup in Vikersund. His second victory followed shortly afterwards on 18 December in Ruka. He received a place in the German squad for the 2022–23 Four Hills Tournament and finished the tournament in 13th place. Since then, Raimund regularly competes in World Cup competitions. The following week, Raimund reached third place with the German team in Zakopane on 14 January 2023, making it his first time on a World Cup podium. His best individual World Cup result to date was fifth place on 18 February 2023 in Râșnov.

In the 2023–24 season he was able to establish himself as a permanent member of the German World Cup squad. On 11 February 2024, he reached the podium in an individual competition for the first time with second place on the large hill in Lake Placid.

He won the 2025 Grand Prix, after winning only one competition (on 18 October 2025 in Hinzenbach).

== Record ==
=== FIS World Nordic Ski Championships ===
Event	Normal hill	Large hill	Team LH	Mixed Team
(Norway) 2025 Trondheim	15	7	4	

=== FIS Ski Flying World Championships ===
Event	Individual	Team
(Germany) 2026 Oberstdorf	13	4

== World Cup ==
=== Season standings ===
Season				Tour Standings			
Season	Overall	4H	SF	RA	W5	T5	P7
2019/20	—	50	—	—	—	44	N/A
2020/21	—	—	—	N/A	—	N/A	—
2021/22	62	—	—	—	N/A		—
2022/23	30	13	—	37	N/A		—
2023/24	19	11	18		N/A		

=== Wins ===
No.	Season	Date	Location	Hill	Size
1	2025/26	6 March 2026	(Finland) Lahti	Salpausselkä HS130	LH

== Personal life ==
Philipp is cousins with footballer Luca Raimund.
