= Sport climbing at the 2023 European Games =

Competition climbing at the 2023 European Games
- Venue: Tarnow Climbing Centre
- Location: Tarnów, Poland
- Dates: 22–25 June
- Competitors: 88 from 18 nations

Competition climbing at the 2023 European Games in Kraków took place from 22 June to 25 June 2023 at Tarnów Climbing Centre, and included mens' and women's events in competition lead climbing, competition bouldering, and competition speed climbing.

== Medal table ==
* Host nation (Poland)

Rank	Nation	Gold	Silver	Bronze	Total
1	France	4	2	0	6
2	Poland*	1	1	1	3
3	Austria	1	0	1	2
4	Italy	0	2	1	3
5	Latvia	0	1	0	1
6	Czech Republic	0	0	1	1
6	Slovenia	0	0	1	1
6	Switzerland	0	0	1	1
Totals (8 entries)		6	6	6	18

== Medal summary ==
Event	Gold	Silver	Bronze
Men's Lead	Diego Fourbet; France	Giorgio Tomatis; Italy	Mathias Posch; Austria
Men's Bouldering	Thomas Lemagner; France	Edvards Gruzītis; Latvia	Julien Clémence; Switzerland
Men's Speed	Lukas Knapp; Austria	Marceau Garnier; France	Marcin Dzieński; Poland
Women's Lead	Camille Pouget; France	Zélia Avezou; France	Tereza Širůčková; Czech Republic
Women's Bouldering	Zélia Avezou; France	Giulia Medici; Italy	Lucija Tarkuš; Slovenia
Women's Speed	Natalia Kałucka; Poland	Aleksandra Mirosław; Poland	Beatrice Colli; Italy

== Lead ==
=== Men ===
Rank	Bib	Name	Semifinal		Final	
Rank	Bib	Name	Score	Rank	Score	Rank
1st place, gold medalist(s)	5	Diego Fourbet (FRA)	40+	3	39	1
2nd place, silver medalist(s)	11	Giorgio Tomatis (ITA)	35	6	38+	2
3rd place, bronze medalist(s)	2	Mathias Posch (AUT)	Top	1	38	3
4	17	Jordi Poles (FRA)	39+	4	38	3
5	4	Yuval Shemla (ISR)	37+	5	38	3
6	16	Lovro Črep (SLO)	34+	7	34+	6
7	3	Milan Preskar (SLO)	34+	7	31+	7
8	13	Davide Colombo (ITA)	34+	7	17+	8
9	1	Jonas Utelli (SUI)	Top	1	8	9
10	10	Nimród Tusnády (HUN)	34+	7	8	9
11	6	Nino Grünenfelder (SUI)	33+	11	Did not advance	
12	8	Jakub Ziętek (POL)	32	12	Did not advance	
13	7	Šimon Potůček (CZE)	31+	13	Did not advance	
14	9	Timo Užnik (AUT)	29+	14	Did not advance	
14	18	Roman Vasko (UKR)	29+	14	Did not advance	
16	14	Leto Cavé (NED)	28+	16	Did not advance	
17	15	Matey Mitsev (BUL)	28	17	Did not advance	
18	12	Martin Matúšek (SVK)	27+	18	Did not advance	
Phase reports:

=== Women ===
Rank	Bib	Name	Semifinal		Final	
Rank	Bib	Name	Score	Rank	Score	Rank
1st place, gold medalist(s)	4	Camille Pouget (FRA)	Top	1	43+	1
2nd place, silver medalist(s)	13	Zélia Avezou (FRA)	44+	5	42+	2
3rd place, bronze medalist(s)	12	Tereza Širůčková (CZE)	43+	8	39	3
4	3	Mattea Pötzi (AUT)	Top	1	38+	4
5	6	Lynn van der Meer (NED)	45+	4	35+	5
6	10	Lucija Tarkuš (SLO)	46+	3	33+	6
7	9	Eva Hammelmüller (AUT)	43+	8	32	7
8	8	Tjaša Slemenšek (SLO)	44+	5	30+	8
9	5	Liv Egli (SUI)	44	7	25+	9
10	2	Ievgeniia Kazbekova (UKR)	39+	10	Did not advance	
11	7	Ilaria Scolaris (ITA)	39	11	Did not advance	
12	11	Emma Bernhard (GER)	37+	12	Did not advance	
13	18	Yuliya Keremidchieva (BUL)	33	13	Did not advance	
14	16	Lucy Garlick (GBR)	29+	14	Did not advance	
15	15	Lucie Delcoigne (BEL)	23+	15	Did not advance	
15	17	Maja Oleksy (POL)	23+	15	Did not advance	
15	14	Sára Šimeková (SVK)	23+	15	Did not advance	
Phase reports:

== Boulder ==
=== Men ===
Rank	Bib	Athlete	Semifinal						Final					
Rank	Bib	Athlete	Boulder				Result	Rank	Boulder				Result	Rank
Rank	Bib	Athlete	1	2	3	4	Result	Rank	1	2	3	4	Result	Rank
1st place, gold medalist(s)	18	Thomas Lemagner (FRA)	T4z4	z2	–	T1z1	2T3z 5 7	3	T4z2	z2	T2z2	z2	2T4z 6 8	1
2nd place, silver medalist(s)	2	Edvards Gruzītis (LAT)	T1z1	T2z2	–	z1	2T3z 3 4	2	T2z1	T1z1	z5	–	2T3z 3 7	2
3rd place, bronze medalist(s)	7	Julien Clémence (SUI)	T2z1	–	–	T1z1	2T2z 3 2	4	T1z1	–	T5z3	–	2T2z 6 4	3
4	8	Dayan Akhtar (GBR)	T4z3	z1	T4z4	z1	2T4z 8 9	1	T2z2	z3	z2	–	1T3z 2 7	4
5	3	Gregor Vezonik (SLO)	T4z4	z6	–	z1	1T3z 4 11	6	z1	–	T7z4	–	1T2z 7 5	5
6	9	Lasse von Freier (GER)	T1z1	z3	–	z3	1T3z1 1 7	5	z3	–	z5	–	0Tz2 0 8	6
7	13	Tim Würthner (GER)	T3z3	–	z3	–	1T2z 3 6	7	Did not advance					
8	1	Ilja Auersperg (AUT)	T4z2	–	–	–	1T1z 4 2	8	Did not advance					
9	6	Don van Laere (NED)	z1	z4	z3	z1	0T4z 0 9	9	Did not advance					
10	14	Julian Wimmer (AUT)	z3	z9	z7	z2	0T4z 0 21	10	Did not advance					
11	4	Ram Levin (ISR)	z2	z5	–	z3	0T3z 0 10	11	Did not advance					
12	5	Matic Kotar (SLO)	z8	z5	–	z2	0T3z 0 15	12	Did not advance					
13	15	Štěpán Potůček (CZE)	z1	–	–	–	0T1z 0 1	13	Did not advance					
13	12	Samuel Richard (FRA)	z1	–	–	–	0T1z 0 1	13	Did not advance					
13	16	Matey Mitsev (BUL)	z1	–	–	–	0T1z 0 1	13	Did not advance					
16	17	Samuel Butterworth (GBR)	–	z4	–	–	0T1z 0 4	16	Did not advance					
17	10	Jakub Ziętek (POL)	–	–	–	–	0T0z 0 0	17	Did not advance					
17	11	Pietro Vidi (ITA)	–	–	–	–	0T0z 0 0	17	Did not advance					
Phase reports:

=== Women ===
Rank	Bib	Athlete	Semifinal						Final					
Rank	Bib	Athlete	Boulder				Result	Rank	Boulder				Result	Rank
Rank	Bib	Athlete	1	2	3	4	Result	Rank	1	2	3	4	Result	Rank
1st place, gold medalist(s)	5	Zélia Avezou (FRA)	T1z1	T2z2	T2z1	–	3T3z 5 4	1	T1z1	T5z5	T2z2	T1z1	4T4z 9 9	1
2nd place, silver medalist(s)	8	Giulia Medici (ITA)	–	z3	T1z1	z3	1T3z 1 7	5	T1z1	z1	–	T1z1	2T3z 2 3	2
3rd place, bronze medalist(s)	10	Lucija Tarkuš (SLO)	T4z4	T4z4	–	–	2T2z 8 8	4	z1	T7z7	–	T2z2	2T3z 9 10	3
4	2	Ievgeniia Kazbekova (UKR)	T1z1	z1	T3z2	z3	2T4z 4 7	3	T2z2	–	–	T3z3	2T2z 5 5	4
5	3	Agathe Calliet (FRA)	T3z3	z5	z3	–	1T3z 3 11	6	z1	T5z5	z3	z1	1T4z 5 10	5
6	1	Sofya Yokoyama (SUI)	T3z3	T5z4	T4z1	–	3T3z 12 8	2	z1	–	T6z6	z8	1T3z 6 15	6
7	17	Jennifer Buckley (SLO)	z12	–	T4z4	z6	1T3z 4 22	7	Did not advance					
8	14	Francesca Matuella (ITA)	T1z1	–	z5	–	1T2z 1 6	8	Did not advance					
9	9	Ingrid Kindlihagen (NOR)	T6z6	z9	–	–	1T2z 6 15	9	Did not advance					
10	4	Afra Hönig (GER)	T2z1	–	–	–	1T1z 2 1	10	Did not advance					
11	16	Lucie Delcoigne (BEL)	z2	z3	–	–	0T2z 0 5	11	Did not advance					
12	11	Lisa Klem (NED)	z2	z6	–	–	0T2z 0 8	12	Did not advance					
13	13	Lea Kempf (AUT)	z1	–	–	–	0T1z 0 1	13	Did not advance					
14	7	Yael Taub (ISR)	–	–	–	z5	0T1z 0 5	14	Did not advance					
15	15	Ema Galeová (CZE)	–	–	–	–	0T0z 0 0	15	Did not advance					
15	18	Anna Bolius (AUT)	–	–	–	–	0T0z 0 0	15	Did not advance					
15	12	Bianka Janecka (POL)	–	–	–	–	0T0z 0 0	15	Did not advance					
15	6	Leonie Lochner (GER)	–	–	–	–	0T0z 0 0	15	Did not advance					
Phase reports:

== Speed ==
=== Men ===
Seeding heats

Rank	Bib	Athlete	Lane A	Lane B	Time
1	13	Ludovico Fossali (ITA)	5.310	7.498	5.310
2	6	Matteo Zurloni (ITA)	5.335	Fall	5.335
3	3	Marcin Dzieński (POL)	5.569	Fall	5.569
4	14	Pierre Rebreyend (FRA)	5.603	7.608	5.603
5	4	Kevin Amon (AUT)	7.161	5.677	5.677
6	12	Oskar Szalecki (POL)	7.465	5.735	5.735
7	9	Lukas Knapp (AUT)	5.755	7.139	5.755
8	11	Jan Kříž (CZE)	5.973	5.957	5.957
9	8	Rafe Stokes (GBR)	6.011	7.192	6.011
10	10	Linus Bader (GER)	6.166	6.109	6.109
11	2	Dorian Zedler (GER)	6.190	6.190	6.190
12	7	Danyil Boldyrev (UKR)	6.406	6.355	6.355
13	5	Matthew Fall (GBR)	10.229	Fall	10.229
14	1	Marceau Garnier (FRA)	6.091	FS	FS

Elimination heats

Heat	Lane	Bib	Athlete	Time	Fastest time	Notes
1	A	13	Ludovico Fossali (ITA)	Fall	5.310	q
1	B	1	Marceau Garnier (FRA)	6.397	6.397	Q
2	A	6	Matteo Zurloni (ITA)	6.662	5.335	
2	B	5	Matthew Fall (GBR)	6.561	6.561	Q
3	A	3	Marcin Dzieński (POL)	5.578	5.578	Q
3	B	7	Danyil Boldyrev (UKR)	7.976	6.355	
4	A	14	Pierre Rebreyend (FRA)	5.669	5.603	Q
4	B	2	Dorian Zedler (GER)	Fall	6.190	
5	A	4	Kevin Amon (AUT)	5.644	5.644	Q
5	B	10	Linus Bader (GER)	6.080	6.080	
6	A	12	Oskar Szalecki (POL)	6.566	5.735	
6	B	8	Rafe Stokes (GBR)	6.044	6.011	Q
7	A	9	Lukas Knapp (AUT)	5.919	5.755	Q
7	B	11	Jan Kříž (CZE)	6.993	5.957	

Final round

Quarter-finals
1 Marcin Dzieński (POL)	5.422
8 Ludovico Fossali (ITA)	Fall
4 Lukas Knapp (AUT)	6.601
5 Rafe Stokes (GBR)	Fall
2 Pierre Rebreyend (FRA)	5.663
7 Matthew Fall (GBR)	6.293
3 Kevin Amon (AUT)	6.373
6 Marceau Garnier (FRA)	5.765

Semi-finals
1 Marcin Dzieński (POL)	5.895
4 Lukas Knapp (AUT)	5.732
2 Pierre Rebreyend (FRA)	FS
6 Marceau Garnier (FRA)

Gold medal
4 Lukas Knapp (AUT)	5.892
6 Marceau Garnier (FRA)	6.404
Bronze medal
1 Marcin Dzieński (POL)	5.466
2 Pierre Rebreyend (FRA)	5.506

=== Women ===
Qualification

Rank	Bib	Athlete	Lane A	Lane B	Time
1	2	Aleksandra Mirosław (POL)	6.642	6.482	6.482
2	3	Natalia Kałucka (POL)	7.038	6.892	6.892
3	6	Capucine Viglione (FRA)	7.419	10.930	7.419
4	7	Beatrice Colli (ITA)	7.743	7.638	7.638
5	9	Giulia Randi (ITA)	8.224	7.662	7.662
6	4	Victoire Andrier (FRA)	7.847	8.454	7.847
7	1	Oksana Burova (UKR)	7.855	8.110	7.855
8	8	Alina Shchyharieva (UKR)	8.405	8.297	8.297
9	5	Nele Thomas (GER)	8.927	9.676	8.927

Final round

Quarter-finals
1 Aleksandra Mirosław (POL)	6.841
8 Alina Shchyharieva (UKR)	18.866
4 Beatrice Colli (ITA)	7.890
5 Giulia Randi (ITA)	8.593
2 Natalia Kałucka (POL)	6.905
7 Oksana Burova (UKR)	7.954
3 Capucine Viglione (FRA)	8.865
6 Victoire Andrier (FRA)	7.849

Semi-finals
1 Aleksandra Mirosław (POL)	6.634
4 Beatrice Colli (ITA)	Fall
2 Natalia Kałucka (POL)	6.800
6 Victoire Andrier (FRA)	7.536

Gold medal
1 Aleksandra Mirosław (POL)	6.635
2 Natalia Kałucka (POL)	6.573
Bronze medal
4 Beatrice Colli (ITA)	7.657
6 Victoire Andrier (FRA)	10.438

== Participating nations ==
NOC	Men	Women	Total
Austria	6	4	10
Belgium		1	1
Bulgaria	1	1	2
Czech Republic	3	2	5
France	6	5	11
Germany	4	4	8
Great Britain	4	1	5
Hungary	1		1
Israel	2	1	3
Italy	5	5	10
Latvia	1		1
Netherlands	2	2	4
Norway		1	1
Poland	3	4	7
Slovakia	1	1	2
Slovenia	4	3	7
Switzerland	3	2	5
Ukraine	2	3	5
Total: 18 NOCs	48	40	88
