= Nadine Ungerank =

Austrian sport shooter (born 1996)

Personal information
- Nationality: Austrian
- Born: 3 April 1996 (age 30) Hall in Tirol, Austria
- Height: 1.68 m (5 ft 6 in)
- Weight: 64 kg (141 lb)

Sport
- Country: Austria
- Sport: Shooting
- Events: 10 meter air rifle; 50 meter rifle prone; 50 metre rifle three positions; 300 m rifle prone; 300 m rifle three positions
- Club: SG Zell am Ziller
Medal record
World Championships
Silver medal – second place	2018 Changwon	300 m rifle 3 positions team
Bronze medal – third place	2023 Baku	50 m rifle prone team
World Cup
Silver medal – second place	2018 Gabala	50 m rifle 3 positions
European Championships
Gold medal – first place	2025 Châteauroux	50 m Rifle Prone Team
Bronze medal – third place	2017 Baku	50m rifle prone team

Nadine Ungerank (born 3 April 1996) is an Austrian sport shooter.

At the 2015 European Shooting Championships she finished 24th individually in the Junior Women's 50m Prone Rifle. With Verena Zaisberger and Sheileen Waibel she won a bronze medal Junior Women's 50m Prone Rifle team.

She participated at the 2018 ISSF World Shooting Championships, winning a medal.

At the 2023 ISSF World Championships in Baku, Ungerank won bronze in the women's 50m prone rifle team event alongside Sheileen Waibel and Rebecca Koeck.

At the Austrian National Championships in September 2023, Ungerank won the 100m rifle pairs competition with Andreas Thum.
