= Sheileen Waibel =

Austrian sport shooter (born 2001)

Personal information
- Citizenship: Austrian
- Born: Sheileen Waibel; January 3, 2001 (age 25) Hohenems, Austria
- Home town: Hohenems, Austria
- Occupation: Sport Shooter
- Height: 158 cm (5 ft 2 in)
- Weight: 48 kg (106 lb)

Sport
- Country: Austria
- Sport: Shooting
- Events: 10 meter air rifle; 50 meter prone rifle; 50 meter three position rifle
- Club: SG Hohenems; USG Altach
- Coached by: Wolfram Waibel; Christian Planer
Medal record
World Championships
Bronze medal – third place	2021 Lima	50 m rifle prone junior
Bronze medal – third place	2023 Baku	50 m rifle prone team
World Cup
Silver medal – second place	2018 Suhl	50 m rifle prone junior
Silver medal – second place	2021 Osijek	50 m rifle 3 positions team
European Games
Silver medal – second place	2023 Kraków–Małopolska	50 m rifle 3 positions mixed team
European Championships
Bronze medal – third place	2015 Suhl	50m rifle three position women junior team
Silver medal – second place	2021 Osijek	50m rifle three position mixed team
Bronze medal – third place	2021 Osijek	50m rifle three position women team
Gold medal – first place	2022 Wroclaw	50m rifle prone mixed team
Gold medal – first place	2025 Châteauroux	50 m Rifle Prone Team

Sheileen Waibel (born 3 January 2001) is an Austrian sports shooter. She has represented Austria in ISSF Air Rifle and 50M Rifle at European and World Championship level. Her father is Olympic medallist Wolfram Waibel Jr., and her grandfather is a five-time Olympian Wolfram Waibel Sr.

== Shooting career ==
Waibel started shooting at the age of 13, through her father Wolfram Waibel Jr., who won two medals at the 1996 Olympic Games in Atlanta before becoming a national coach.

Waibel's first international selection was to the 2015 European Shooting Championships where she finished 24th individually in the Junior Women's 50m Prone Rifle. With Nadine Ungerank and Verena Zaisberger she won a bronze medal in Junior Women's 50m Prone Rifle team.

Her first international individual medal came at the 2018 ISSF Junior World Cup in Suhl. She won silver in the 50m Prone Rifle, finished 7th in the final of the 50m Three-Position Rifle and placed 34th in the 10m Air Rifle.

At the 2019 ISSF Junior World Cup she won the bronze medal in the 50m Prone Rifle.

At the 2021 European Championships she won silver in the 50m rifle three-position mixed team with Gernot Rumpler, and bronze in the 50m rifle three-position women's team, alongside Franziska Peer and Olivia Hoffman.

At the 2022 European Championships, she won the 50m prone rifle mixed team with Thomas Mathis.

At the 2023 World Championships, Waibel won team bronze in the Women's 50m Prone Rifle team event. In 2023, Waibel won the national inter-state team match competing for Vorarlberg with Marlene Pribitzer and Yvonne Klocker.
