= Aneta Stankiewicz =

Polish sports shooter (born 1995)

Personal information
- Nationality: Polish
- Born: 10 February 1995 (age 31) Bydgoszcz, Poland

Sport
- Sport: Sports shooting
Medal record
Shooting
Representing Poland
European Games
Bronze medal – third place	2023 Kraków–Małopolska	10 m air rifle team
European Championships
Silver medal – second place	2024 Győr	10 m air rifle team

Aneta Stankiewicz (born 10 February 1995) is a Polish sports shooter. She competed in the women's 10 metre air rifle event at the 2020 Summer Olympics.
