= Anna Odine Strøm =

Norwegian ski jumper (born 1998)

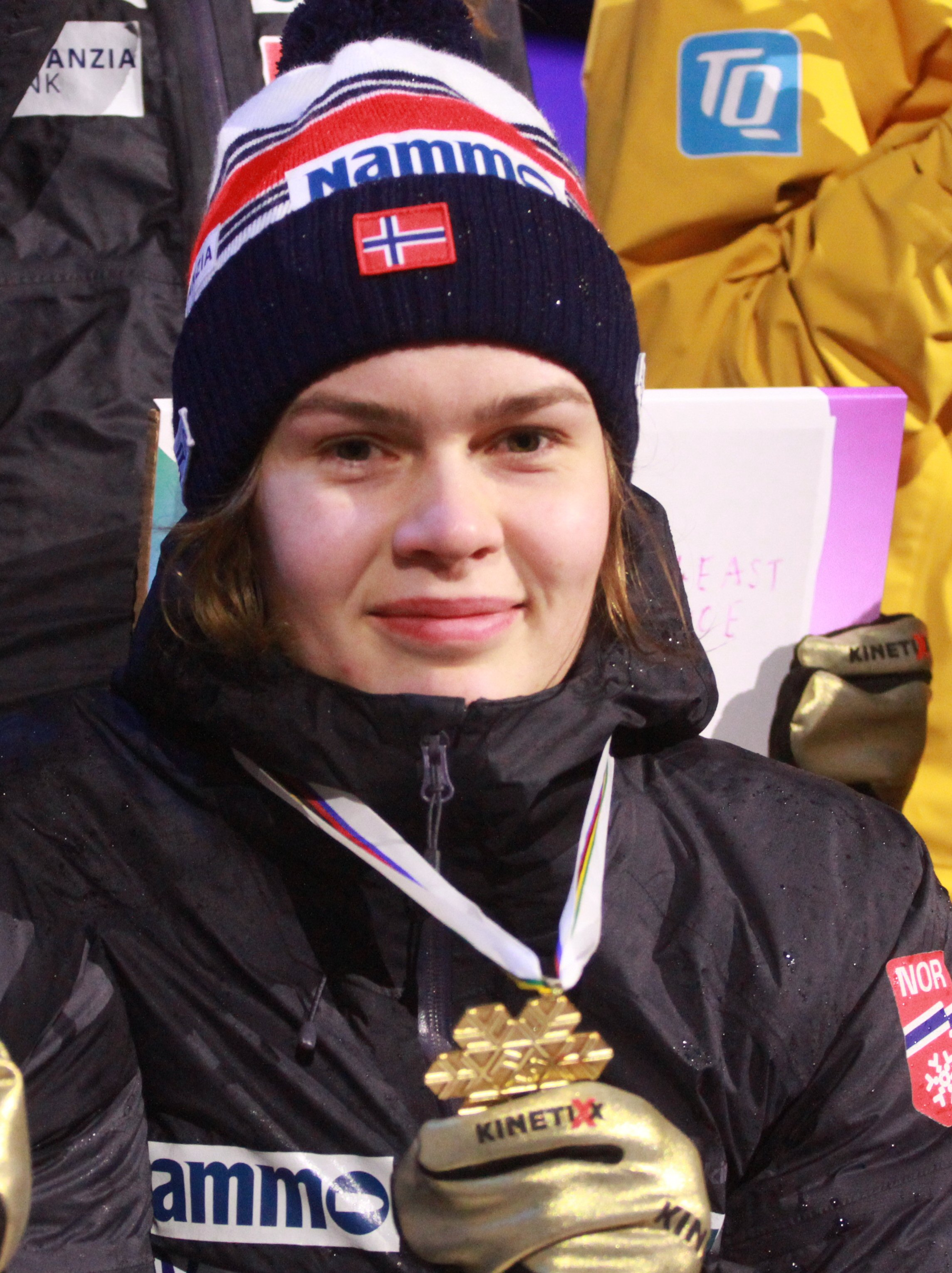
- Strøm in 2025

Personal information
- Nationality: Norway
- Born: 17 April 1998 (age 28) Alta, Norway
- Height: 171 cm (5 ft 7 in)

Sport
- Sport: Skiing
- Club: Alta IF

World Cup career
- Seasons: 2013–present
- Indiv. starts: 181
- Indiv. podiums: 28
- Indiv. wins: 4
- Team starts: 14
- Team podiums: 7
- Team wins: 1

Achievements and titles
- Personal bests: 235.5 m (773 ft); Vikersund, 21 March 2026
Medal record
Women's ski jumping
Representing Norway
Olympic Games
Gold medal – first place	2026 Milano Cortina	Individual NH
Gold medal – first place	2026 Milano Cortina	Individual LH
Silver medal – second place	2026 Milano Cortina	Mixed team
World Championships
Gold medal – first place	2025 Trondheim	Team NH
Gold medal – first place	2025 Trondheim	Mixed team LH
Silver medal – second place	2023 Planica	Mixed team NH
Bronze medal – third place	2019 Seefeld	Team NH
Bronze medal – third place	2019 Seefeld	Mixed team NH
Bronze medal – third place	2021 Oberstdorf	Team NH
Bronze medal – third place	2023 Planica	Individual NH
Bronze medal – third place	2023 Planica	Team NH
Bronze medal – third place	2025 Trondheim	Individual NH
European Games
Silver medal – second place	2023 Kraków–Małopolska	Mixed team NH
- Updated on 22 March 2026

Anna Odine Strøm (born 17 April 1998) is a Norwegian ski jumper. She won two gold medals and one silver medal at the 2026 Winter Olympics.

Her achievements include winning individual bronze medals in the world championships in 2023 and 2025, and winning team medals in 2019, 2021, 2023 and 2025.

== Career ==
Strøm was born in Alta on 17 April 1998. She has represented Norway at FIS Nordic World Ski Championships five times (in 2015, 2019, 2021, 2023 and 2025).

She won a bronze medal in the normal hill at the FIS Nordic World Ski Championships 2023. Competing at the 2023 European Games, she was part of the Norwegian team that placed second in the mixed team contest, along with Eirin Maria Kvandal, Robert Johansson, and Marius Lindvik.

She won a bronze medal in Individual NH at the FIS Nordic World Ski Championships 2025 in Trondheim. She further won a gold medal in women's team normal hill with the Norwegian team at the 2025 world championships.

She won 2 gold medals and 1 silver medal at the 2026 Winter Olympics. She is the first female ski jumper ever to win both individual normal hill and individual large hill events at the same Winter Olympic Games.

== World Cup ==
=== Standings ===
Season	Position	Points
2013–14	58	10
2015–16	48	8
2016–17	58	4
2017–18	17	234
2018–19	7	717
2019–20	17	237
2020–21	21	165
2021–22	17	292
2022–23	4	1278
2023–24	31	80
2024–25	8	801
2025–26	3	1578

=== Wins ===
No.	Season	Date	Location	Hill	Size
1	2022/23	31 December 2022	(Slovenia) Ljubno	Savina HS94	NH
2	2022/23	29 January 2023	(Germany) Hinterzarten	Adler Ski Stadium HS111	LH
3	2022/23	18 February 2023	(Romania) Râșnov	Trambulina HS97	NH
4	2025/26	4 December 2025	(Poland) Wisła	Malinka HS134	LH

== Olympic results ==
Year	Individual Normal Hill	Individual Large Hill	Mixed Team
(Italy) Milano-Cortina 2026	1st place, gold medalist(s)	1st place, gold medalist(s)	2nd place, silver medalist(s)
