= Radek Rýdl =

Czech freestyle skier

Personal information
- Nationality: Czech Republic
- Born: 15 July 2001 (age 23); Jilemnice, Czech Republic

Sport
- Sport: Ski jumping
- Club: TJ Dukla Liberec

Radek Rýdl (born 15 July 2001) is a Czech Ski jumper who competed in the 2022 Winter Olympics. He trains out of Harrachov.
