= Poland at the 2023 European Games =

- IOC code: POL
- NOC: Polish Olympic Committee
- Website: www.olimpijski.pl

in Kraków and Małopolska, Poland 21 June – 2 July 2023
- Medals Ranked 6th: Gold 13 Silver 19 Bronze 18 Total 50

European Games appearances (overview)
- 2015; 2019; 2023; 2027

Poland competed as the host nation at the 2023 European Games, in Kraków and Małopolska, Poland, from 21 June to 2 July 2023.

== Medalists ==
Medal	Name	Sport	Event	Date
Gold	Anna Puławska; Dominika Putto; Karolina Naja; Adrianna Kąkol	Canoe sprint	Women's K-4 500 meters	22 June
Gold	Klaudia Breś	Shooting	Women's 10 metre air pistol	22 June
Gold	Natalia Kałucka	Sport climbing	Women's speed	22 June
Gold	Anna Puławska; Karolina Naja	Canoe sprint	Women's K-2 500 metres	23 June
Gold	Dorota Borowska	Canoe sprint	Women's C-1 200 metres	23 June
Gold	Ewa Swoboda	Athletics	Women's 100 metres	23 June
Gold	Wojciech Nowicki	Athletics	Men's hammer throw	24 June
Gold	Pia Skrzyszowska	Athletics	Women's 100 metres hurdles	24 June
Gold	Julia Walczyk-Klimaszyk	Fencing	Women's individual foil	25 June
Gold	Michał Siess	Fencing	Men's individual foil	26 June
Gold	Martyna Kierczyńska	Muaythai	Women's combat 54 kg	27 June
Gold	Dawid Kubacki	Ski jumping	Men's large hill individual	1 July
Gold	Robert Krasoń	Kickboxing	Men's full contact -86 kg	2 July
Silver	Aleksandra Mirosław	Sport climbing	Women's speed	22 June
Silver	Natalia Kaczmarek	Athletics	Women's 400 metres	23 June
Silver	Sylwia Szczerbińska; Aleksander Kitewski	Canoe sprint	Mixed C-2 200 metres	24 June
Silver	Ewa Swoboda; Marika Popowicz-Drapała; Monika Ramaszko; Magdalena Stefanowicz	Athletics	Women's 4 × 100 metres relay	24 June
Silver	Albert Komański	Athletics	Men's 200 metres	25 June
Silver	Anna Kiełbasińska; Natalia Kaczmarek; Maks Szwed; Igor Bogaczyński	Athletics	Mixed 4 × 400 metres relay	25 June
Silver	Krzysztof Kaczkowski	Fencing	Men's individual sabre	25 June
Silver	none (Note: Athletics at the 2023 European Games were contested in the 2023 European Athletics Team Championships and therefore as in the latter competition, the team medals for overall standing in First Division were given to the nations as a team, but not the individual athletes.)	Athletics	First Division	25 June
Silver	Natalia Kochańska	Shooting	Women's 50 metre rifle three positions	26 June
Silver	Martyna Swatowska-Wenglarczyk	Fencing	Women's individual épée	26 June
Silver	Aleksandra Kowalczuk	Taekwondo	Women's +73 kg	26 June
Silver	Oskar Siegert	Muaythai	Men's combat 67 kg	27 June
Silver	Roksana Dargiel	Muaythai	Women's combat 51 kg	27 June
Silver	Poland women's national rugby sevens team: Patrycja Zawadzka; Julianna Schuster; Tamara Czumer-Iwin; Małgorzata Kołdej; Marta Morus; Katarzyna Paszczyk; Anna Klichowska; Hanna Maliszewska; Julia Druzgała; Natalia Pamięta; Sylwia Witkowska; Martyna Wardaszka	Rugby sevens	Women's	27 June
Silver	Joanna Wawrzonowska; Klaudia Breś; Julita Borek	Shooting	Women's team 25 metre rapid fire pistol	28 June
Silver	Dariusz Popiela; Mateusz Polaczyk; Michał Pasiut	Canoe slalom	Men's K-1 team	29 June
Silver	Adrian Duszak	Teqball	Men's singles	29 June
Silver	Klaudia Zwolińska	Canoe slalom	Women's K-1	1 July
Silver	Klaudia Zwolińska	Canoe slalom	Women's C-1	2 July
Bronze	Norman Zezula; Aleksander Kitewski	Canoe sprint	Men's C-2 500 meters	22 June
Bronze	Miłosz Sabiecki	Karate	Men's kumite 67 kg	22 June
Bronze	Marcin Dzieński	Sport climbing	Men's speed	23 June
Bronze	Michał Bąbos	Karate	Men's kumite 84 kg	23 June
Bronze	Aneta Stankiewicz; Julia Piotrowska; Natalia Kochańska	Shooting	Women's team 10 metre air rifle	24 June
Bronze	Poland men's national 3x3 team: Adrian Bogucki; Szymon Rduch; Mateusz Szlachetka; Przemysław Zamojski	3x3 basketball	Men's	24 June
Bronze	Norbert Kobielski	Athletics	Men's high jump	25 June
Bronze	Jakub Rajewski	Muaythai	Men's combat 71 kg	26 June
Bronze	Dominika Filec	Muaythai	Women's combat 60 kg	26 June
Bronze	Mateusz Bereźnicki	Boxing	Men's 92 kg	30 June
Bronze	Marek Pokwap; Alicja Bartnicka	Teqball	Mixed doubles	30 June
Bronze	Elżbieta Wójcik	Boxing	Women's 75 kg	30 June
Bronze	Oskar Sobański	Kickboxing	Men's full contact -63.5 kg	1 July
Bronze	Jakub Pokusa	Kickboxing	Men's full contact -75 kg	1 July
Bronze	Kinga Szlachcic	Kickboxing	Women's full contact -60 kg	1 July
Bronze	Karolina Juja	Kickboxing	Women's full contact -70 kg	1 July
Bronze	Alicja Bartnicka; Ewa Kamińska	Teqball	Women's doubles	1 July
Bronze	Adrian Duszak; Marek Pokwap	Teqball	Men's doubles	2 July

Medals by sport
Sport	1st place, gold medalist(s)	2nd place, silver medalist(s)	3rd place, bronze medalist(s)	Total
3x3 basketball	0	0	1	1
Athletics	3	5	1	9
Boxing	0	0	2	2
Canoe slalom	0	3	0	3
Canoe sprint	3	1	1	5
Fencing	2	2	0	4
Karate	0	0	2	2
Kickboxing	1	0	4	5
Muaythai	1	2	2	5
Rugby sevens	0	1	0	1
Shooting	1	2	1	4
Ski jumping	1	0	0	1
Sport climbing	1	1	1	3
Taekwondo	0	1	0	1
Teqball	0	1	3	4
Total	13	19	18	50

Medals by gender
Gender	1st place, gold medalist(s)	2nd place, silver medalist(s)	3rd place, bronze medalist(s)	Total	Percentage
Female	9	11	6	26	52%
Male	4	5	11	20	40%
Mixed	0	3	1	4	8%
Total	13	19	18	50	100%
