= Średnia Krokiew =

Ski jumping hill complex in Zakopane, Poland

Coordinates: 49.2796°N 19.9683°E

- Kompleks Średniej Krokwi im. Bronisława Czecha
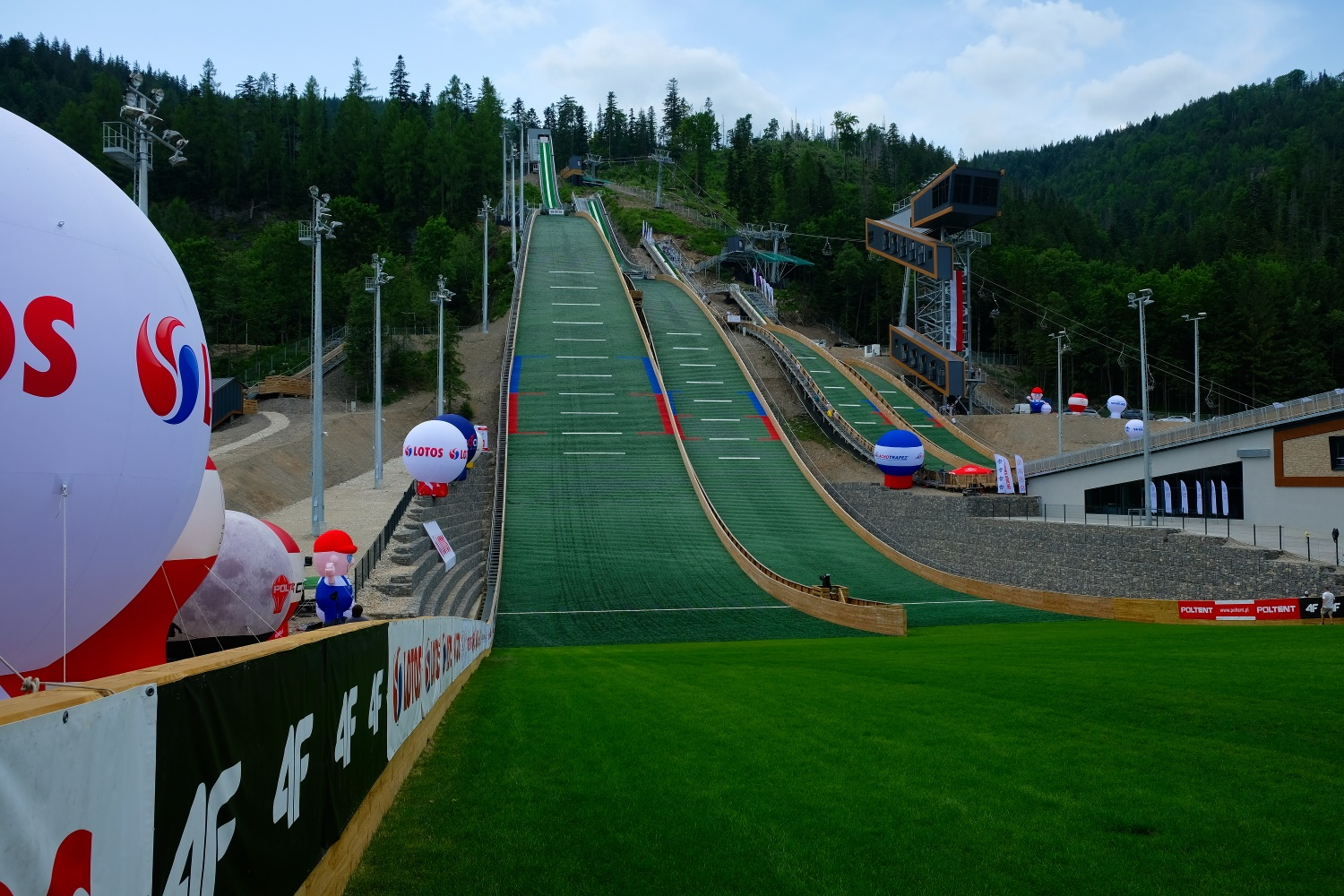
- Location: Zakopane; Poland
- Opened: 1950
- Renovated: 2021

Size
- K–point: K-95
- Hill size: HS 105
- Hill record: 105 m (354 ft) (Poland) Klemens Murańka (29 October 2021)

Top events
- World Championships: 1962

Kompleks Średniej Krokwi im. Bronisława Czecha (The Bronisław Czech Medium Krokiew Complex) is a ski jumping complex of normal, medium, and small hills, built on the slope of Krokiew mountain (1378 m) in Zakopane, Poland.

== History ==
The hill was opened in 1950. It hosted 1962 FIS Nordic World Ski Championships on normal hill and one FIS Ski jumping World Cup event in 1980.

The official opening of the remodeled complex was July 9, 2021. The complex has been equipped with plastic mattings, artificial lighting, snowmaking system, changing rooms and training hall, and the four largest facilities with artificially frozen inrun tracks.

Competitions are held on the track both in winter and in summer. So in 2022, in October, the summer ski jumping championship starts.
