= Shooting at the 2023 European Games – Mixed team 10 metre air rifle =

Mixed team 10 metre air rifle at the 2023 European Games
- Venue: Wrocław Shooting Centre
- Dates: 22 June
- Competitors: 64 from 20 nations
- Teams: 32

Medalists
gold medal	Eszter Mészáros; Zalán Pekler	Hungary
silver medal	Paula Grande; Jesús Oviedo	Spain
bronze medal	Sofia Ceccarello; Danilo Sollazzo	Italy

The mixed team 10 metre air rifle event at the 2023 European Games took place on 22 June at the Wrocław Shooting Centre.

== Records ==
Prior to this competition, the existing world, European and Games records were as follows.

Qualification
World Record	India; Narmada Raju; Rudrankksh Patil	635.8	Cairo, Egypt	20 February 2023
European Record	Hungary; Eszter Dénes; István Péni	633.9	New Delhi, India	22 March 2021
Games Record	Russia; Anastasiia Galashina; Vladimir Maslennikov	629.9	Minsk, Belarus	22 June 2019

== Results ==
=== Qualification ===
Rank	Country	Athlete	Series			Total	Team total	Notes
Rank	Country	Athlete	1	2	3	Total	Team total	Notes
1	Hungary 2	Eszter Mészáros	104.4	105.8	104.0	314.2	631.6	QG, GR
1	Hungary 2	Zalán Pekler	105.3	106.3	105.8	317.4	631.6	QG, GR
2	Spain	Paula Grande	104.7	106.0	105.3	316.0	631.4	QG
2	Spain	Jesús Oviedo	104.2	105.5	105.7	315.4	631.4	QG
3	Italy 1	Sofia Ceccarello	104.9	105.3	105.4	315.6	631.0	QB
3	Italy 1	Danilo Sollazzo	105.2	105.7	104.5	315.4	631.0	QB
4	Czech Republic 1	Aneta Brabcová	103.3	103.8	105.5	312.6	628.6	QB
4	Czech Republic 1	František Smetana	105.2	104.7	106.1	316.0	628.6	QB
5	Switzerland 1	Nina Christen	105.8	105.5	105.2	316.5	628.5	
5	Switzerland 1	Jan Lochbihler	103.7	103.9	104.4	312.0	628.5	
6	Czech Republic 2	Lucie Brázdová	103.1	103.8	105.8	312.7	628.1	
6	Czech Republic 2	Jiří Přívratský	104.0	105.8	105.6	315.4	628.1	
7	Norway 2	Jenny Stene	105.1	104.8	104.7	314.6	628.1	
7	Norway 2	Henrik Larsen	105.1	104.9	103.5	313.5	628.1	
8	Denmark	Rikke Ibsen	104.1	104.3	105.5	313.9	628.0	
8	Denmark	Nicklas Højfeldt Kildehøj	103.9	105.5	104.7	314.1	628.0	
9	Norway 1	Jeanette Hegg Duestad	102.9	104.9	106.1	313.9	627.6	
9	Norway 1	Jon-Hermann Hegg	103.5	105.8	104.4	313.7	627.6	
10	Austria 1	Marlene Pribitzer	104.9	105.6	104.8	315.3	627.6	
10	Austria 1	Alexander Schmirl	102.4	104.2	105.7	312.3	627.6	
11	Italy 2	Barbara Gambaro	104.0	105.4	104.7	314.1	627.2	
11	Italy 2	Riccardo Armiraglio	104.4	104.7	104.0	313.1	627.2	
12	Serbia 1	Teodora Vukojević	103.3	104.5	105.3	313.1	626.8	
12	Serbia 1	Lazar Kovačević	104.4	104.2	105.1	313.7	626.8	
13	Hungary 1	Eszter Dénes	103.6	104.8	104.1	312.5	626.8	
13	Hungary 1	István Péni	105.0	105.4	103.9	314.3	626.8	
14	France 1	Océanne Muller	104.7	105.9	105.4	316.0	626.3	
14	France 1	Alexis Raynaud	103.6	104.0	102.7	310.3	626.3	
15	France 2	Judith Gomez	105.6	104.8	104.9	315.3	626.1	
15	France 2	Brian Baudouin	102.9	103.8	104.1	310.8	626.1	
16	Ukraine 2	Daria Tykhova	104.8	104.5	103.1	312.4	625.7	
16	Ukraine 2	Oleh Tsarkov	104.4	105.5	103.4	313.3	625.7	
17	Great Britain	Seonaid McIntosh	104.9	104.4	105.4	314.7	625.6	
17	Great Britain	Michael Bargeron	103.4	102.7	104.8	310.9	625.6	
18	Serbia 2	Ivana Maksimović	104.6	105.7	103.9	314.2	625.6	
18	Serbia 2	Milutin Stefanović	103.0	102.7	105.7	311.4	625.6	
19	Poland 1	Aneta Stankiewicz	104.4	105.5	103.4	313.3	625.3	
19	Poland 1	Tomasz Bartnik	103.0	103.9	105.1	312.0	625.3	
20	Israel	Olga Tashtchiev	103.4	104.7	104.7	312.8	625.3	
20	Israel	Sergey Richter	105.4	104.4	102.7	312.5	625.3	
21	Poland 2	Julia Piotrowska	104.3	103.6	104.2	312.1	625.0	
21	Poland 2	Maciej Kowalewicz	104.3	103.2	105.4	312.9	625.0	
22	Slovakia 1	Kamila Novotná	103.7	104.7	104.4	312.8	624.9	
22	Slovakia 1	Patrik Jány	104.7	103.3	104.1	312.1	624.9	
23	Austria 2	Sheileen Waibel	103.2	101.2	102.7	307.1	624.2	
23	Austria 2	Martin Strempfl	106.0	105.3	105.8	317.1	624.2	
24	Ukraine 1	Viktoriya Sukhorukova	103.6	104.2	102.9	310.7	623.9	
24	Ukraine 1	Serhii Kulish	104.7	103.8	104.7	313.2	623.9	
25	Sweden	Isabelle Johansson	102.0	103.9	104.2	310.1	623.5	
25	Sweden	Marcus Madsen	104.5	104.9	104.0	313.4	623.5	
26	Finland	Emmi Hyrkäs	104.3	103.8	103.5	311.6	622.9	
26	Finland	Aleksi Leppä	103.9	103.0	104.4	311.3	622.9	
27	Switzerland 2	Chiara Leone	104.3	104.3	106.3	314.9	622.7	
27	Switzerland 2	Christoph Dürr	101.7	102.3	103.8	307.8	622.7	
28	Germany 2	Lisa Müller	103.0	104.1	104.6	311.7	622.6	
28	Germany 2	Maximilian Dallinger	103.3	103.7	103.9	310.9	622.6	
29	Slovakia 2	Daniela Pešková	104.3	103.3	103.5	311.1	621.5	
29	Slovakia 2	Štefan Šulek	104.1	102.5	103.8	310.4	621.5	
30	Bosnia and Herzegovina	Farah Onešćuk	104.0	104.4	104.9	313.3	618.4	
30	Bosnia and Herzegovina	Nedžad Džanković	104.1	100.6	100.4	305.1	618.4	
31	Germany 1	Anna Janssen	104.2	104.6	105.1	313.9	616.4	
31	Germany 1	Maximilian Ulbrich	102.9	104.5	95.1	302.5	616.4	
32	North Macedonia	Anastasija Mojsovska	101.0	101.7	102.3	305.0	615.2	
32	North Macedonia	Martin Angeleski	103.1	103.0	104.1	310.2	615.2	
	Croatia	Marta Zeljković	Did not start					
	Croatia	Miran Maričić	Did not start					

=== Finals ===
Rank	Country	Athletes	Total
Gold medal match
1st place, gold medalist(s)	Hungary 2	Eszter Mészáros; Zalán Pekler	17
2nd place, silver medalist(s)	Spain	Paula Grande; Jesús Oviedo	7
Bronze medal match
3rd place, bronze medalist(s)	Italy 1	Sofia Ceccarello; Danilo Sollazzo	16
4	Czech Republic 1	Aneta Brabcová; František Smetana	8
