= Shooting at the 2023 European Games – Men's 10 metre air rifle =

Men's 10 metre air rifle at the 2023 European Games
- Venue: Wrocław Shooting Centre
- Dates: 23 June
- Competitors: 38 from 24 nations

Medalists
gold medal	Danilo Sollazzo	Italy
silver medal	Maximilian Ulbrich	Germany
bronze medal	Jiří Přívratský	Czech Republic

The men's 10 metre air rifle event at the 2023 European Games took place on 23 June at the Wrocław Shooting Centre.

== Records ==
Prior to this competition, the existing world, European and Games records were as follows.

Qualification
World Record	Sheng Lihao (CHN)	637.9	Baku, Azerbaijan	12 May 2023
European Record	Zalán Pekler (HUN)	636.2	Baku, Azerbaijan	12 May 2023
Games Record	Sergey Kamenskiy (RUS)	631.1	Minsk, Belarus	24 June 2019

== Results ==
=== Qualification ===
Rank	Athlete	Country	1	2	3	4	5	6	Total	Notes
1	Jiří Přívratský	Czech Republic	104.6	103.6	105.6	106.1	104.9	106.2	631.0	Q
2	Brian Baudouin	France	104.9	105.2	105.2	105.3	105.9	104.5	631.0	Q
3	Maximilian Ulbrich	Germany	104.7	105.8	105.8	105.2	104.5	104.9	630.9	Q
4	Anton Rizov	Bulgaria	105.9	103.4	104.1	105.7	104.6	105.9	629.6	Q
5	Martin Strempfl	Austria	104.9	103.8	105.2	105.7	105.7	104.3	629.6	Q
6	Danilo Sollazzo	Italy	104.3	103.1	105.2	105.6	105.1	106.2	629.5	Q
7	Sergey Richter	Israel	105.0	104.6	105.7	104.7	104.4	104.9	629.3	Q
8	Alexander Schmirl	Austria	105.6	102.7	104.6	103.7	105.9	106.4	628.9	Q
9	Marcus Madsen	Sweden	103.0	104.6	103.6	106.0	105.8	105.5	628.5	
10	Serhii Kulish	Ukraine	105.3	104.6	105.0	103.2	105.6	104.8	628.5	
11	Henrik Larsen	Norway	104.3	104.4	105.0	104.3	105.7	104.7	628.4	
12	Zalán Pekler	Hungary	104.9	104.8	104.6	104.5	105.5	104.0	628.3	
13	Lazar Kovačević	Serbia	105.6	103.8	104.7	104.6	105.6	103.8	628.1	
14	Maximilian Dallinger	Germany	103.0	105.0	106.0	103.8	105.4	104.7	627.9	
15	István Péni	Hungary	103.9	104.7	104.2	106.1	105.5	103.5	627.9	
16	Jon-Hermann Hegg	Norway	104.1	104.9	103.8	104.7	104.3	106.0	627.8	
17	Patrik Jány	Slovakia	104.3	104.0	105.1	104.8	104.7	104.9	627.8	
18	František Smetana	Czech Republic	103.7	105.0	103.9	105.8	103.6	105.7	627.7	
19	Oleh Tsarkov	Ukraine	105.4	104.4	105.3	103.2	105.6	103.8	627.7	
20	Milutin Stefanović	Serbia	104.6	105.0	104.6	104.7	105.4	103.3	627.6	
21	Jesús Oviedo	Spain	105.1	104.3	104.7	104.4	104.3	104.4	627.2	
22	Nicklas Højfeldt Kildehøj	Denmark	104.0	104.7	105.7	104.6	104.0	104.0	627.0	
23	Mert Nalbant	Turkey	103.4	105.2	103.3	105.2	103.6	105.6	626.3	
24	Maciej Kowalewicz	Poland	103.8	103.9	105.2	104.7	104.9	103.8	626.3	
25	Alexis Raynaud	France	104.3	105.0	104.0	103.9	104.4	104.5	626.1	
26	Josip Sikavica	Croatia	105.2	103.7	105.6	103.2	104.6	103.6	625.9	
27	Štefan Šulek	Slovakia	104.4	104.5	103.8	103.9	105.2	104.0	625.8	
28	Jan Lochbihler	Switzerland	103.9	104.4	103.2	103.7	105.5	104.9	625.6	
29	Tomasz Bartnik	Poland	102.0	104.8	105.7	104.3	104.6	103.9	625.3	
30	Karolis Girulis	Lithuania	104.2	104.6	104.8	103.2	103.2	104.9	624.9	
31	Aleksi Leppä	Finland	103.4	105.4	105.4	104.2	102.3	102.9	623.6	
32	Ömer Akgün	Turkey	104.4	103.2	103.2	103.6	104.7	104.1	623.2	
33	Meelis Kiisk	Estonia	105.1	103.9	104.4	101.2	104.5	104.1	623.2	
34	Christoph Dürr	Switzerland	103.9	103.7	104.5	103.9	103.7	103.3	623.0	
35	Riccardo Armiraglio	Italy	104.1	102.4	104.5	104.4	102.0	104.7	622.1	
36	Borna Petanjek	Croatia	100.5	104.8	105.4	102.0	105.3	103.2	621.2	
37	Martin Angeleski	North Macedonia	101.7	103.2	103.5	102.5	104.1	100.8	615.8	
38	Nedžad Džanković	Bosnia and Herzegovina	100.4	102.2	102.5	102.5	102.6	103.1	613.3	

=== Ranking match ===
Rank	Athlete	Series					Total	Notes
Rank	Athlete	1	2	3	4	5	Total	Notes
1	Maximilian Ulbrich (GER)	51.9	52.0	52.7	52.1	52.8	261.5	QG
1	Maximilian Ulbrich (GER)	51.9	103.9	156.6	208.7	261.5	261.5	QG
2	Danilo Sollazzo (ITA)	52.2	52.0	52.8	52.3	51.9	261.2	QG
2	Danilo Sollazzo (ITA)	52.2	104.2	157.0	209.3	261.2	261.2	QG
3rd place, bronze medalist(s)	Jiří Přívratský (CZE)	52.0	51.4	53.6	52.6	51.0	260.6	
3rd place, bronze medalist(s)	Jiří Přívratský (CZE)	52.0	103.4	157.0	209.6	260.6	260.6	
4	Martin Strempfl (AUT)	51.6	51.8	51.9	52.4	52.1	259.8	
4	Martin Strempfl (AUT)	51.7	103.4	155.3	207.7	259.8	259.8	
5	Sergey Richter (ISR)	51.5	51.4	52.9	51.8		207.6	
5	Sergey Richter (ISR)	51.5	102.9	155.8	207.6		207.6	
6	Alexander Schmirl (AUT)	51.6	51.6	51.9	51.6		206.7	
6	Alexander Schmirl (AUT)	51.6	103.2	155.1	206.7		206.7	
7	Brian Baudouin (FRA)	49.3	52.7	52.0			154.0	
7	Brian Baudouin (FRA)	49.3	102.0	154.0			154.0	
8	Anton Rizov (BUL)	50.4	50.5	51.4			152.3	
8	Anton Rizov (BUL)	50.4	100.9	152.3			152.3	

=== Gold medal match ===
Rank	Athlete	Shot													Total
Rank	Athlete	1	2	3	4	5	6	7	8	9	10	11	12	13	Total
1st place, gold medalist(s)	Danilo Sollazzo (ITA)	10.4	10.1	10.5	10.6	10.3	10.5	10.7	10.6	10.6	10.5	10.6	10.6	10.6	17
2nd place, silver medalist(s)	Maximilian Ulbrich (GER)	9.8	10.5	10.6	10.5	10.5	10.4	9.3	10.3	10.5	10.6	10.6	10.4	10.3	9
