= Shooting at the 2024 Summer Olympics – Men's 10 metre air rifle =

Men's 10 metre air rifle at the Games of the XXXIII Olympiad
- Venue: National Shooting Centre, Châteauroux
- Dates: 28-29 July 2024
- Competitors: 49 from 32 nations

Medalists
1st place, gold medalist(s)		Sheng Lihao	China
2nd place, silver medalist(s)		Victor Lindgren	Sweden
3rd place, bronze medalist(s)		Miran Maričić	Croatia

The Men's 10 meter air rifle event at the 2024 Summer Olympics took place on 28–29 July 2024 at the National Shooting Centre, Châteauroux.

Sheng Lihao of China won the gold medal, his second at the Paris Olympics.

== Records ==
Prior to this competition, the existing world and Olympic records were as follows:

Qualification records
World record	Péter Sidi (HUN)	633.5	Munich, Germany	25 May 2013
Olympic record	Yang Haoran (CHN)	632.7	Tokyo, Japan	25 July 2021

Final records
World record	Yu Haonan (CHN)	252.8	Rio de Janeiro, Brazil	30 August 2019
Olympic record	William Shaner (USA)	251.6	Tokyo, Japan	25 July 2021

== Schedule ==
All times are Central European Summer Time (UTC+2)

Date	Time	Round
Sunday, 28 July 2024		Qualification
Monday, 29 July 2024		Final

== Results ==
=== Qualification ===
Rank	Shooter	Nation	1	2	3	4	5	6	Total	Notes
1	Sheng Lihao	China	106.0	105.5	105.3	104.9	105.6	104.4	631.7	Q
2	Julián Gutiérrez	Argentina	105.6	107.4	104.4	105.9	104.2	104.2	631.7	Q
3	Danilo Sollazzo	Italy	105.5	105.6	105.6	104.8	105.3	104.6	631.4	Q
4	Miran Maričić	Croatia	105.4	105.7	106.1	106.6	104.8	102.7	631.3	Q
5	Choe Dae-han	South Korea	106.1	105.6	104.8	105.9	104.5	103.9	630.8	Q
6	Victor Lindgren	Sweden	105.2	105.4	105.2	105.8	104.0	105.1	630.7	Q
7	Arjun Babuta	India	105.2	105.4	105.2	105.8	104.0	105.1	630.1	Q
8	Petar Gorša	Croatia	106.2	104.9	104.7	104.4	105.4	104.2	629.8	Q
9	Jon-Hermann Hegg	Norway	105.2	104.5	105.2	105.6	103.9	105.2	629.6	
10	Edoardo Bonazzi	Italy	103.4	104.7	106.3	104.7	105.9	104.5	629.5	
11	Lucas Kryzs	France	105.4	104.1	104.9	105.6	104.1	105.3	629.4	
12	Sandeep Singh	India	103.6	104.0	105.5	104.8	105.4	106.0	629.3	
13	Park Ha-jun	South Korea	104.1	106.1	103.2	105.6	104.2	106.0	629.2	
14	Maximilian Ulbrich	Germany	104.4	103.1	106.2	105.2	105.8	104.2	628.9	
15	Fathur Gustafian	Indonesia	104.1	104.0	105.1	104.1	104.8	106.6	628.7	
16	Jack Rossiter	Australia	104.6	104.0	104.3	106.3	105.1	104.2	628.5	
17	Zalán Pekler	Hungary	104.9	104.7	104.5	106.1	104.7	103.5	628.4	
18	István Péni	Hungary	102.9	105.0	105.8	103.9	105.3	105.4	628.3	
19	Edson Ramírez	Mexico	104.1	103.7	106.4	104.6	104.9	104.6	628.3	
20	Patrik Jány	Slovakia	104.6	105.6	104.2	104.5	104.8	104.3	628.0	
21	Islam Satpayev	Kazakhstan	105.6	103.9	104.2	105.4	104.9	104.0	628.0	
22	Aleksi Leppa	Finland	103.9	104.8	104.4	104.6	104.4	105.7	627.8	
23	Jiří Přívratský	Czech Republic	106.3	104.3	105.1	104.0	103.0	105.1	627.8	
24	Mohamed Hamdy Abdelkader	Egypt	104.0	104.5	105.6	104.6	104.9	104.2	627.8	
25	Maciej Kowalewicz	Poland	103.4	104.8	103.9	106.9	105.6	103.2	627.8	
26	Alexander Schmirl	Austria	104.8	104.0	104.5	104.8	104.6	105.0	627.7	
27	Serhiy Kulish	Ukraine	105.1	104.5	104.4	104.1	104.5	104.8	627.4	
28	Martin Strempfl	Austria	105.3	104.1	105.4	104.4	103.7	104.3	627.2	
29	Nyantain Bayaraa	Mongolia	105.1	105.6	104.8	104.6	103.5	103.4	627.0	
30	Dane Sampson	Australia	104.8	104.1	104.1	105.4	104.3	104.2	626.9	
31	Naoya Okada	Japan	104.9	105.4	104.9	104.4	104.5	102.7	626.8	
32	Konstantin Malinovskiy	Kazakhstan	103.9	105.6	104.8	105.3	104.1	102.9	626.6	
33	Sergey Richter	Israel	104.0	104.4	104.7	103.8	104.2	105.3	626.4	
34	Ivan Roe	United States	105.0	103.7	103.9	103.3	105.0	105.4	626.3	
35	Rylan Kissell	United States	103.4	103.9	104.6	106.0	104.7	103.7	626.3	
36	Tomasz Bartnik	Poland	104.5	103.8	103.6	105.2	105.9	103.1	626.1	
37	Lazar Kovačević	Serbia	103.8	103.4	104.1	104.3	105.0	104.8	625.5	
38	František Smetana	Czech Republic	102.9	105.4	103.7	103.7	105.0	104.8	625.5	
39	Ibrahim Korayiem	Egypt	103.7	104.7	103.7	106.1	103.5	103.4	625.3	
40	Marcus Madsen	Sweden	103.9	102.5	105.2	104.9	104.3	104.2	625.0	
41	Du Linshu	China	104.1	104.1	103.9	105.4	103.5	104.0	625.0	
42	Ole Martin Halvorsen	Norway	104.5	104.5	104.1	104.5	103.5	103.8	624.9	
43	Muhammad Robiul Islam	Bangladesh	105.5	103.2	103.5	103.4	104.7	103.9	624.2	
44	Carlos Quezada	Mexico	102.2	103.6	103.5	103.8	104.8	103.7	621.6	
45	Romain Aufrère	France	100.7	103.6	105.1	102.9	104.6	104.5	621.4	
46	Israel Gutierrez	El Salvador	101.3	103.4	103.8	103.9	103.1	105.6	621.1	
47	Michael Bargeron	Great Britain	104.3	103.1	102.6	103.5	102.7	104.5	620.7	
48	Tye Ikeda	Canada	101.1	101.2	103.5	104.2	103.7	103.7	617.4	
49	Koceila Adoul	Algeria	102.4	101.3	102.9	101.9	102.9	102.0	613.4	

=== Final ===
Rank	Shooter	Nation	1	2	3	4	5	6	7	8	9	Total	Notes
1st place, gold medalist(s)	Sheng Lihao	China	53.4	105.8	126.5	148.2	169.8	190.2	210.5	231.1	252.2	252.2	OR
2nd place, silver medalist(s)	Victor Lindgren	Sweden	52.5	104.6	125.6	146.4	167.6	188.7	209.3	230.5	251.4	251.4	
3rd place, bronze medalist(s)	Miran Maričić	Croatia	52.8	105.1	125.3	146.2	167.8	189.0	209.8	230.0	—N/a	230.0	
4	Arjun Babuta	India	52.4	105.0	126.4	146.9	167.8	188.4	208.4	—N/a		208.4	
5	Danilo Sollazzo	Italy	52.0	104.1	124.4	145.4	166.5	187.4	—N/a			187.4	
6	Petar Gorša	Croatia	51.8	104.8	125.8	145.7	165.6	—N/a				165.0	
7	Choe Dae-han	South Korea	51.7	103.3	124.1	145.2	—N/a					145.2	
8	Julián Gutiérrez	Argentina	51.4	102.7	122.8	—N/a						122.8	
