= 2026 ISSF World Shooting Championships – Men's 10 metre air rifle =

Men's 10 metre air rifle at the 2026 World Shooting Championships
- Venue: Lusail Shooting Complex, Doha
- Dates: 3 November 2026
- Competitors: 107 from 53 nations

Medalists
gold medal	Sheng Lihao	China
silver medal	Ma Sihan	China
bronze medal	Miran Maričić	Croatia

The men's 10 metre air rifle event at the 2026 World Shooting Championships will be held on 3 November 2026 at the Lusail Shooting Complex in Doha, Qatar. A total of 107 shooters will participate in the competition. Maximilian Dallinger of Germany is the defending champion.

== Results ==
=== Qualification round ===
Rank	Shooter	NOC	1	2	3	4	5	6	Total	Notes
1	Sheng Lihao	China	105.5	106.1	106.6	106.0	106.9	106.1	637.2	Q
2	Josip Sikavica	Croatia	103.9	106.2	106.7	105.2	106.3	106.4	634.7	Q
3	Miran Maričić	Croatia	106.4	106.0	105.5	106.3	105.0	104.5	633.7	Q
4	Jon-Hermann Hegg	Norway	104.4	104.8	106.5	105.7	106.5	105.5	633.4	Q
5	Patrik Jány	Slovakia	104.5	106.2	106.5	106.2	104.3	105.0	632.7	Q
6	Dimitri Dutendas	France	105.4	105.6	105.1	104.2	106.3	105.7	632.3	Q
7	Ma Sihan	China	105.2	105.4	104.8	105.1	105.5	106.2	632.2	Q
8	Zhang Changhong	China	105.0	106.4	105.3	105.6	105.4	104.5	632.2	Q
9	Muhammad Uzman	Pakistan	105.5	104.5	105.1	106.0	106.1	104.7	631.9	
10	Jens Oestli	Norway	106.2	104.3	105.6	105.0	105.5	105.2	631.8	
11	Jack Rossiter	Australia	105.1	106.7	106.1	105.1	104.5	104.2	631.7	
12	Maximilian Dallinger	Germany	105.7	104.6	106.0	104.6	104.4	106.3	631.6	
13	Marcus Madsen	Sweden	105.3	104.7	104.8	104.9	105.7	105.5	630.9	
14	Zalán Pekler	Hungary	105.3	105.8	104.8	105.3	104.3	105.3	630.8	
15	Amirmohammad Nekounam	Iran	104.7	106.0	105.1	105.0	104.6	104.9	630.3	
16	Parth Mane	India	104.7	105.4	105.6	104.7	105.2	104.7	630.3	
17	Aleksa Rakonjac	Serbia	103.7	105.8	106.0	105.0	104.9	104.8	630.2	
18	Lucas Kryzs	France	104.7	106.3	106.0	104.5	104.9	103.8	630.2	
19	István Péni	Hungary	106.5	104.9	103.4	104.3	104.5	106.2	629.8	
20	Artyom Grigoryan	Armenia	103.1	105.6	104.8	105.4	105.2	105.4	629.5	
21	Maximilian Ulbrich	Germany	104.3	103.7	106.7	105.4	105.4	103.9	629.4	
22	Petar Gorša	Croatia	104.6	105.6	105.0	103.5	105.0	105.5	629.2	
23	Naoki Hanakawa	Japan	104.9	105.9	104.0	104.6	104.3	105.5	629.2	
24	Masaya Endoh	Japan	104.9	103.6	105.6	104.9	104.9	105.3	629.2	
25	Ömer Akgün	Turkey	104.7	104.4	103.7	105.4	106.0	105.0	629.2	
26	Lee Jun-hwan	South Korea	103.5	104.5	105.6	105.7	104.3	105.4	629.0	
27	Brian Baudouin	France	104.9	105.6	103.7	105.0	104.8	105.0	629.0	
28	Marko Ivanović	Serbia	104.3	104.5	105.0	105.2	105.8	104.2	629.0	
29	Henrik Larsen	Norway	103.8	103.9	104.8	106.0	105.6	104.8	628.9	
30	Park Ha-jun	South Korea	103.2	104.9	105.4	104.2	105.5	105.5	628.7	
31	Filip Nepejchal	Czechia	104.0	103.3	105.7	105.3	105.0	105.4	628.7	
32	Edoardo Bonazzi	Italy	102.5	104.8	104.5	105.9	105.7	105.3	628.7	
33	Islam Satpayev	Kazakhstan	105.5	103.6	105.4	103.9	105.7	104.6	628.7	
34	Sergei Novoselov	AIN	103.9	105.3	105.0	104.7	105.8	104.0	628.7	
35	Naoya Okada	Japan	104.8	105.4	104.0	104.9	104.1	105.3	628.5	
36	Daniel Bühlmeyer	Germany	104.7	104.8	104.5	104.9	104.3	105.2	628.4	
37	Martin Strempfl	Austria	104.8	105.1	105.7	103.8	104.3	104.7	628.4	
38	Serhiy Kulish	Ukraine	104.3	105.6	105.4	104.6	104.1	104.4	628.4	
39	Rabbi Hasan Munna	Bangladesh	104.6	104.1	105.0	104.3	104.7	105.6	628.3	
40	Thomas Mathis	Austria	104.4	104.7	104.5	104.9	105.1	104.6	628.2	
41	Himanshu Dhillon	India	103.9	104.9	105.5	104.1	104.4	105.3	628.1	
42	Khalid Abdulrahman Sharshani	Qatar	104.0	103.9	104.0	104.4	105.9	105.5	627.7	
43	Javohir Sokhibov	Uzbekistan	106.9	103.9	105.2	103.7	103.9	103.8	627.4	
44	Victor Lindgren	Sweden	105.2	105.3	104.0	105.0	104.2	103.7	627.4	
45	Chanon Binmad	Thailand	103.5	105.6	105.7	103.7	104.7	104.0	627.2	
46	Amir Memisevic	Bosnia and Herzegovina	103.9	106.4	104.0	104.9	104.6	103.3	627.1	
47	Dean Bale	Great Britain	105.1	104.3	102.8	104.8	104.7	105.1	626.8	
48	Danilo Sollazzo	Italy	103.7	104.6	105.7	104.2	104.2	104.4	626.8	
49	Nguyễn Minh Quang	Vietnam	103.9	104.6	103.8	104.9	105.9	103.5	626.6	
50	Anton Rizov	Bulgaria	103.8	102.6	105.4	103.9	105.0	105.8	626.5	
51	Peter Sidi	Romania	103.4	104.8	104.1	105.8	104.2	104.2	626.5	
52	Anang Febrian	Indonesia	105.2	103.8	104.5	106.1	102.7	104.1	626.4	
53	Angelos Stylianos Sarantakis	Greece	101.3	105.1	105.1	106.0	105.6	103.3	626.4	
54	Maciej Kowalewicz	Poland	104.2	105.7	103.9	102.8	104.4	105.3	626.3	
55	Fabio Wyrsch	Switzerland	103.8	105.5	102.1	104.4	104.7	105.0	626.0	
56	Aleksi Leppä	Finland	104.1	103.9	105.0	103.6	104.9	104.5	626.0	
57	Jiří Přívratský	Czechia	104.3	102.9	104.6	104.3	105.4	104.4	625.9	
58	Dmitrii Pimenov	AIN	105.2	104.5	103.9	104.3	103.4	104.4	625.7	
59	Patrick Diem	Austria	102.5	104.9	104.7	105.2	103.7	104.6	625.6	
60	Petr Nymburský	Czechia	103.1	104.1	103.8	105.0	105.0	104.4	625.4	
61	Paarth Makhija	India	102.3	104.4	104.9	104.7	105.2	103.7	625.2	
62	Galip Berat Afal	Turkey	104.5	105.6	103.6	105.9	102.1	103.5	625.2	
63	Stefan Sulek	Slovakia	103.8	102.2	104.6	103.6	105.0	105.9	625.1	
64	Arnab Sharar	Bangladesh	104.9	103.8	102.2	103.2	104.7	106.2	625.0	
65	Lazar Kovačević	Serbia	103.6	103.5	102.9	104.7	104.9	105.4	625.0	
66	Sulaiman Khan	Pakistan	104.1	105.4	105.8	102.9	103.9	102.9	625.0	
67	Khalid Mohammed Al-Kalbani	Oman	102.9	104.4	105.0	102.6	104.8	105.2	624.9	
68	Konstantin Malinovsky	Kazakhstan	103.9	104.7	104.0	103.5	104.5	104.3	624.9	
69	Nguyễn Tâm Quang	Vietnam	103.8	103.8	104.2	104.5	105.0	103.6	624.9	
70	Péter Somogyi	Hungary	104.1	102.8	104.1	104.4	104.4	104.9	624.7	
71	Wiktor Sajdak	Poland	105.5	103.2	104.6	103.7	103.6	103.9	624.5	
72	Mohamed Mostafa Saad	Egypt	103.3	103.4	105.4	105.1	102.7	104.1	624.0	
73	Kang Jun-gi	South Korea	105.2	104.0	104.3	103.6	103.0	103.7	623.8	
74	Abdullah Zain Al-Sunaidi	Qatar	102.0	105.4	104.4	105.3	103.4	103.3	623.8	
75	Mert Nalbant	Turkey	103.2	102.5	104.4	104.7	104.0	104.8	623.6	
76	Mesfer Aboud Alammari	Saudi Arabia	103.9	103.1	104.5	104.2	103.9	103.3	622.9	
77	Nikita Shakhtorin	Kazakhstan	104.5	104.5	102.9	104.7	103.6	102.7	622.9	
78	Tomasz Bartnik	Poland	102.8	104.4	103.2	104.5	103.4	104.5	622.8	
79	Jan Lochbihler	Switzerland	102.9	102.0	104.2	104.7	103.1	105.3	622.2	
80	Erik Sahlin	Sweden	102.9	104.1	103.6	103.8	104.5	103.2	622.1	
81	Kanurian Al Ghozi	Indonesia	103.1	105.8	103.2	103.8	104.1	102.1	622.1	
82	Nikita Sokolov	Uzbekistan	102.1	103.2	103.6	103.5	104.9	104.6	621.9	
83	Lorenzo Bacci	Italy	102.2	104.1	104.3	103.0	103.4	104.7	621.7	
84	Pedro Afonso	Portugal	102.8	103.5	103.1	105.9	102.1	104.3	621.7	
85	Martin Angeleski	North Macedonia	102.7	102.1	103.9	102.8	104.2	105.3	621.0	
86	Sukhrobjon Mirzajonov	Uzbekistan	102.8	103.5	104.8	102.5	103.4	103.9	620.9	
87	Stephen Mitchell	Great Britain	103.0	103.6	103.4	104.0	102.3	104.5	620.8	
88	Daniel Vidal Molina	Chile	102.5	102.6	104.3	102.7	104.8	103.3	620.2	
89	Eduardo Sampaio Gonçalves	Brazil	102.4	103.1	102.8	103.4	103.7	104.3	619.7	
90	Kamil Nuriakhmetov	AIN	102.2	103.2	101.8	104.4	103.7	104.0	619.3	
91	Selim Shahat	Egypt	102.7	105.0	102.9	103.4	102.0	103.2	619.2	
92	Koceila Adoul	Algeria	103.0	102.0	102.3	103.2	104.9	103.5	618.9	
93	Cristóbal Robles Morales	Chile	103.1	103.1	102.3	102.6	103.6	103.8	618.5	
94	Cassio Rippel	Brazil	102.2	103.6	102.3	102.3	102.7	102.8	615.9	
95	Haritz Ikil Hessly Hafiz	Malaysia	102.2	104.2	105.0	100.4	99.9	104.1	615.8	
96	Bader Alotibi	Saudi Arabia	104.3	103.7	100.9	104.1	101.8	100.0	614.8	
97	Faez Safaq Alanazi	Saudi Arabia	103.0	101.7	101.2	102.0	102.6	102.8	613.3	
98	Ali Al-Mutairi	Kuwait	99.7	103.9	103.9	101.4	101.8	102.3	613.0	
99	Abdullah Al-Harbi	Kuwait	98.9	102.0	103.0	104.8	102.7	100.2	611.6	
100	Saud Al-Subaiei	Kuwait	102.2	102.0	102.9	101.0	102.9	100.4	611.4	
101	Salem Mohamed Alyammahi	United Arab Emirates	101.7	101.2	102.5	102.3	100.9	102.2	610.8	
102	Ali Al-Mohannadi	Qatar	100.4	101.5	102.9	101.1	103.0	101.1	610.0	
103	Ibrahim Ali	United Arab Emirates	101.5	103.3	99.9	101.4	102.2	101.5	609.8	
104	Ayman Salim Al-Riyami	Oman	101.7	103.0	100.2	103.7	97.0	100.8	606.4	
105	Mohamed Khalil Kaoulal	Algeria	101.0	102.3	99.4	101.9	98.1	100.3	603.0	
—N/a	Allan Márquez Rodríguez	Guatemala	Did not start in the competition							
—N/a	Donalson Muñoz Bermudes	Guatemala	Did not start in the competition							

=== Final ===
Rank	Athlete	First stage		Second stage – Elimination							Notes
Rank	Athlete	5	10	12	14	16	18	20	22	24	Notes
1st place, gold medalist(s)	Sheng Lihao (CHN)	53.1	105.7	126.3	148.0	169.3	190.2	211.4	232.7	254.1	
2nd place, silver medalist(s)	Ma Sihan (CHN)	52.6	105.7	126.9	147.9	169.2	189.9	210.8	231.8	253.1	
3rd place, bronze medalist(s)	Miran Maričić (CRO)	52.8	104.8	125.8	147.0	167.8	188.5	209.3	229.9	—N/a	
4	Zhang Changhong (CHN)	52.4	104.1	125.4	146.2	167.5	188.3	209.0	—N/a		
5	Josip Sikavica (CRO)	51.8	104.3	125.5	145.8	166.9	187.5	—N/a			
6	Patrik Jány (SVK)	51.5	103.8	125.0	145.0	166.1	—N/a				
7	Dimitri Dutendas (FRA)	53.1	104.3	124.2	144.9	—N/a					
8	Jon-Hermann Hegg (NOR)	52.0	103.4	124.2	—N/a						
