= Shooting at the 2023 European Games – Men's team 10 metre air rifle =

Men's team 10 metre air rifle at the 2023 European Games
- Venue: Wrocław Shooting Centre
- Dates: 24 June
- Competitors: 33 from 11 nations
- Teams: 11

Medalists
gold medal	Soma Hammerl; Zalán Pekler; István Péni	Hungary
silver medal	Petar Gorša; Miran Maričić; Josip Sikavica	Croatia
bronze medal	Alexander Schmirl; Martin Strempfl; Andreas Thum	Austria

The men's team 10 metre air rifle event at the 2023 European Games took place on 24 June at the Wrocław Shooting Centre.

== Records ==
Prior to this competition, the existing world, European and Games records were as follows.

Qualification
World Record	—	—	—	—
European Record	Norway; Simon Claussen; Jon-Hermann Hegg; Henrik Larsen	947.4	Rio de Janeiro, Brazil	13 April 2022
Games Record	—	—	—	—

== Results ==
=== Qualification 1 ===
Rank	Country	Athlete	Series			Total	Team total	Notes
Rank	Country	Athlete	1	2	3	Total	Team total	Notes
1	Austria	Martin Strempfl	105.6	105.8	105.6	317.0	944.7	Q, GR
1	Austria	Alexander Schmirl	103.5	105.8	104.7	314.0	944.7	Q, GR
1	Austria	Andreas Thum	104.0	104.9	104.8	313.7	944.7	Q, GR
2	Germany	Maximilian Ulbrich	106.3	105.0	105.4	316.7	943.8	Q
2	Germany	Maximilian Dallinger	104.7	105.3	105.3	315.3	943.8	Q
2	Germany	David Koenders	104.9	103.6	103.3	311.8	943.8	Q
3	Italy	Danilo Sollazzo	105.8	105.9	105.2	316.9	943.7	Q
3	Italy	Edoardo Bonazzi	106.0	104.1	105.4	315.5	943.7	Q
3	Italy	Riccardo Armiraglio	102.4	104.0	104.9	311.3	943.7	Q
4	Czech Republic	František Smetana	104.8	106.4	104.8	316.0	943.3	Q
4	Czech Republic	Petr Nymburský	104.0	104.4	105.3	313.7	943.3	Q
4	Czech Republic	Jiří Přívratský	103.9	105.7	104.0	313.6	943.3	Q
5	Norway	Jon-Hermann Hegg	106.0	104.2	105.8	316.0	940.8	Q
5	Norway	Henrik Larsen	105.7	104.2	105.0	314.9	940.8	Q
5	Norway	Ole Martin Halvorsen	104.1	103.5	102.3	309.9	940.8	Q
6	Hungary	Zalán Pekler	105.9	105.5	105.0	316.4	940.7	Q
6	Hungary	István Péni	104.0	105.0	105.3	314.3	940.7	Q
6	Hungary	Soma Hammerl	103.0	104.8	102.2	310.0	940.7	Q
7	Ukraine	Serhii Kulish	105.2	104.6	106.5	316.3	939.3	Q
7	Ukraine	Sviatoslav Hudzyi	102.6	104.2	105.0	311.8	939.3	Q
7	Ukraine	Oleh Tsarkov	103.9	102.2	105.1	311.2	939.3	Q
8	Croatia	Josip Sikavica	105.4	105.3	104.0	314.7	939.3	Q
8	Croatia	Petar Gorša	104.6	104.4	105.4	314.4	939.3	Q
8	Croatia	Miran Maričić	103.3	104.2	102.7	310.2	939.3	Q
9	Serbia	Lazar Kovačević	104.1	105.2	104.4	313.7	937.9	
9	Serbia	Milutin Stefanović	104.5	104.3	103.7	312.5	937.9	
9	Serbia	Milenko Sebic	104.4	104.3	103.0	311.7	937.9	
10	Poland	Tomasz Bartnik	104.3	104.1	104.3	312.7	933.8	
10	Poland	Maciej Kowalewicz	104.3	104.8	102.0	311.1	933.8	
10	Poland	Rafał Łukaszyk	103.4	102.8	103.8	310.0	933.8	
11	Turkey	Ömer Akgün	105.7	101.6	103.1	310.4	927.5	
11	Turkey	Mert Nalbant	103.7	103.4	103.1	310.2	927.5	
11	Turkey	Ahmet Bayrak	99.8	103.4	103.7	306.9	927.5	

=== Qualification 2 ===
Rank	Country	Athlete	Series		Total	Team total	Notes
Rank	Country	Athlete	1	2	Total	Team total	Notes
1	Hungary	Zalán Pekler	106.5	105.6	212.1	628.3	QG
1	Hungary	István Péni	104.3	105.3	209.6	628.3	QG
1	Hungary	Soma Hammerl	103.5	103.1	206.6	628.3	QG
2	Croatia	Josip Sikavica	104.0	105.9	209.9	627.8	QG
2	Croatia	Miran Maričić	104.9	104.2	209.1	627.8	QG
2	Croatia	Petar Gorša	103.3	105.5	208.8	627.8	QG
3	Austria	Martin Strempfl	104.6	105.8	210.4	627.5	QB
3	Austria	Alexander Schmirl	105.6	103.4	209.0	627.5	QB
3	Austria	Andreas Thum	104.6	103.5	208.1	627.5	QB
4	Ukraine	Sviatoslav Hudzyi	105.0	104.8	209.8	627.3	QB
4	Ukraine	Oleh Tsarkov	104.5	104.9	209.4	627.3	QB
4	Ukraine	Serhii Kulish	103.6	104.5	208.1	627.3	QB
5	Italy	Edoardo Bonazzi	105.2	104.6	209.8	626.7	
5	Italy	Riccardo Armiraglio	104.5	104.4	208.9	626.7	
5	Italy	Danilo Sollazzo	104.3	103.7	208.0	626.7	
6	Norway	Jon-Hermann Hegg	103.8	105.7	209.5	626.6	
6	Norway	Henrik Larsen	104.1	105.3	209.4	626.6	
6	Norway	Ole Martin Halvorsen	104.9	102.8	207.7	626.6	
7	Germany	Maximilian Ulbrich	105.4	103.8	209.2	623.1	
7	Germany	Maximilian Dallinger	103.9	104.9	208.8	623.1	
7	Germany	David Koenders	101.6	103.5	205.1	623.1	
8	Czech Republic	František Smetana	104.9	104.5	209.4	622.7	
8	Czech Republic	Jiří Přívratský	104.3	104.7	209.0	622.7	
8	Czech Republic	Petr Nymburský	101.7	102.6	204.3	622.7	

=== Finals ===
Rank	Country	Athletes	Total
Gold medal match
1st place, gold medalist(s)	Hungary	Soma Hammerl; Zalán Pekler; István Péni	16
2nd place, silver medalist(s)	Croatia	Petar Gorša; Miran Maričić; Josip Sikavica	2
Bronze medal match
3rd place, bronze medalist(s)	Austria	Alexander Schmirl; Martin Strempfl; Andreas Thum	16
4	Ukraine	Sviatoslav Hudzyi; Serhii Kulish; Oleh Tsarkov	2
