= Shooting at the 2023 European Games – Men's team 50 metre rifle three positions =

Men's team 50 metre rifle three positions at the 2023 European Games
- Venue: Wrocław Shooting Centre
- Dates: 29 June
- Competitors: 33 from 11 nations
- Teams: 11

Medalists
gold medal	Soma Hammerl; Zalán Pekler; István Péni	Hungary
silver medal	Petr Nymburský; František Smetana; Jiří Přívratský	Czech Republic
bronze medal	Lazar Kovačević; Milenko Sebić; Milutin Stefanović	Serbia

The men's team 50 metre rifle three positions event at the 2023 European Games took place on 29 June at the Wrocław Shooting Centre.

== Records ==
Prior to this competition, the existing world, European and Games records were as follows.

Qualification
World Record	—	—	—	—
European Record	Norway; Simon Claussen; Jon-Hermann Hegg; Henrik Larsen	1335	Osijek, Croatia	30 May 2021
Games Record	—	—	—	—

== Results ==
=== Qualification 1 ===
Rank	Country	Athlete	Kneeling	Prone	Standing	Total	Team total	Notes
1	Czech Republic	František Smetana	146	149	148	443-28x	1328-79x	Q, GR
1	Czech Republic	Petr Nymburský	148	147	148	443-25x	1328-79x	Q, GR
1	Czech Republic	Jiří Přívratský	149	148	145	442-26x	1328-79x	Q, GR
2	Norway	Simon Kolstad Claussen	150	149	143	442-26x	1321-73x	Q
2	Norway	Jon-Hermann Hegg	148	147	147	442-23x	1321-73x	Q
2	Norway	Ole Martin Halvorsen	150	148	139	437-24x	1321-73x	Q
3	Hungary	István Péni	149	149	146	444-27x	1320-69x	Q
3	Hungary	Soma Hammerl	147	148	144	439-21x	1320-69x	Q
3	Hungary	Zalán Pekler	148	147	142	437-21x	1320-69x	Q
4	Poland	Maciej Kowalewicz	148	150	149	447-27x	1318-61x	Q
4	Poland	Tomasz Bartnik	146	148	145	439-20x	1318-61x	Q
4	Poland	Rafał Łukaszyk	144	147	141	432-14x	1318-61x	Q
5	Serbia	Milutin Stefanović	150	149	143	442-22x	1315-69x	Q
5	Serbia	Milenko Sebić	146	150	142	438-22x	1315-69x	Q
5	Serbia	Lazar Kovačević	144	146	145	435-25x	1315-69x	Q
6	Slovakia	Patrik Jány	145	148	148	441-21x	1314-58x	Q
6	Slovakia	Štefan Šulek	147	148	146	441-20x	1314-58x	Q
6	Slovakia	Ondrej Holko	142	149	141	432-17x	1314-58x	Q
7	Croatia	Miran Maričić	149	147	144	440-22x	1313-69x	Q
7	Croatia	Petar Gorša	148	148	143	439-26x	1313-69x	Q
7	Croatia	Josip Sikavica	143	142	149	434-21x	1313-69x	Q
8	Germany	Maximilian Dallinger	148	148	144	440-19x	1313-51x	Q
8	Germany	Maximilian Ulbrich	147	147	145	439-17x	1313-51x	Q
8	Germany	David Koenders	144	148	142	434-15x	1313-51x	Q
9	Ukraine	Serhii Kulish	150	148	147	445-23x	1309-55x	
9	Ukraine	Oleh Tsarkov	145	146	145	436-19x	1309-55x	
9	Ukraine	Sviatoslav Hudzyi	141	143	144	428-13x	1309-55x	
10	Austria	Andreas Thum	148	148	148	444-28x	1308-63x	
10	Austria	Alexander Schmirl	148	148	147	443-26x	1308-63x	
10	Austria	Martin Strempfl	137	145	139	421-9x	1308-63x	
11	France	Lucas Kryzs	147	149	146	442-26x	1308-62x	
11	France	Brian Baudouin	142	148	143	433-18x	1308-62x	
11	France	Alexis Raynaud	144	146	143	433-18x	1308-62x	

=== Qualification 2 ===
Rank	Country	Athlete	Kneeling	Prone	Standing	Total	Team total	Notes
1	Czech Republic	Jiří Přívratský	100	97	99	296-16x	881-52x	QG
1	Czech Republic	Petr Nymburský	100	100	94	294-19x	881-52x	QG
1	Czech Republic	František Smetana	94	100	97	291-17x	881-52x	QG
2	Hungary	Zalán Pekler	98	99	98	295-12x	881-38x	QG
2	Hungary	István Péni	97	99	98	294-15x	881-38x	QG
2	Hungary	Soma Hammerl	97	99	96	292-11x	881-38x	QG
3	Norway	Simon Kolstad Claussen	100	100	96	296-21x	879-56x	QB
3	Norway	Jon-Hermann Hegg	98	100	95	293-16x	879-56x	QB
3	Norway	Ole Martin Halvorsen	100	97	93	290-19x	879-56x	QB
4	Serbia	Lazar Kovačević	98	100	99	297-20x	879-44x	QB
4	Serbia	Milenko Sebić	97	99	96	292-14x	879-44x	QB
4	Serbia	Milutin Stefanović	97	98	95	290-10x	879-44x	QB
5	Germany	Maximilian Dallinger	97	100	97	294-15x	879-38x	
5	Germany	Maximilian Ulbrich	98	100	96	294-10x	879-38x	
5	Germany	David Koenders	97	96	98	291-13x	879-38x	
6	Slovakia	Štefan Šulek	98	100	97	295-17x	876-51x	
6	Slovakia	Ondrej Holko	97	98	99	294-20x	876-51x	
6	Slovakia	Patrik Jány	95	98	94	287-14x	876-51x	
7	Poland	Maciej Kowalewicz	99	100	97	296-17x	873-50x	
7	Poland	Tomasz Bartnik	97	99	94	290-17x	873-50x	
7	Poland	Rafał Łukaszyk	94	98	95	287-16x	873-50x	
8	Croatia	Petar Gorša	99	99	98	296-13x	873-40x	
8	Croatia	Josip Sikavica	98	97	94	289-13x	873-40x	
8	Croatia	Miran Maričić	96	97	95	288-14x	873-40x	

=== Finals ===
Rank	Country	Athletes	Total
Gold medal match
1st place, gold medalist(s)	Hungary	Soma Hammerl; Zalán Pekler; István Péni	17
2nd place, silver medalist(s)	Czech Republic	Petr Nymburský; František Smetana; Jiří Přívratský	9
Bronze medal match
3rd place, bronze medalist(s)	Serbia	Lazar Kovačević; Milenko Sebić; Milutin Stefanović	16
4	Norway	Simon Kolstad Claussen; Ole Martin Halvorsen; Jon-Hermann Hegg	12
