= Shooting at the 2023 European Games – Men's 50 metre rifle three positions =

Men's 50 metre rifle three positions at the 2023 European Games
- Venue: Wrocław Shooting Centre
- Dates: 25 June
- Competitors: 33 from 21 nations

Medalists
gold medal	Zalán Pekler	Hungary
silver medal	Jiří Přívratský	Czech Republic
bronze medal	Alexander Schmirl	Austria

The men's 50 metre rifle three positions event at the 2023 European Games took place on 25 June at the Wrocław Shooting Centre.

== Records ==
Prior to this competition, the existing world, European and Games records were as follows.

Qualification
World Record	Jan Lochbihler (SUI)	596	Cairo, Egypt	3 March 2023
European Record	Jan Lochbihler (SUI)	596	Cairo, Egypt	3 March 2023
Games Record	—	—	—	—

== Results ==
=== Qualification ===
Rank	Athlete	Country	Kneeling		Prone		Standing		Total	Notes
Rank	Athlete	Country	1	2	1	2	1	2	Total	Notes
1	Alexander Schmirl	Austria	100	99	100	100	98	98	595-37x	Q, GR
2	Jon-Hermann Hegg	Norway	97	100	100	99	100	97	593-38x	Q
3	Zalán Pekler	Hungary	98	98	100	100	98	99	593-36x	Q
4	Marcus Madsen	Sweden	100	97	99	100	97	99	592-39x	Q
5	Simon Kolstad Claussen	Norway	100	99	99	98	98	97	591-36x	Q
6	Jiří Přívratský	Czech Republic	98	100	100	100	96	97	591-35x	Q
7	Petar Gorša	Croatia	99	97	100	100	99	96	591-34x	Q
8	Simon Weithaler	Italy	99	98	100	99	98	96	590-37x	Q
9	Aleksi Leppä	Finland	98	97	99	100	99	97	590-26x	
10	Miran Maričić	Croatia	98	97	100	100	97	97	589-32x	
11	Serhii Kulish	Ukraine	95	100	99	100	97	97	588-33x	
12	Petr Nymburský	Czech Republic	98	98	100	100	95	96	587-34x	
13	Anton Rizov	Bulgaria	97	96	98	99	98	99	587-32x	
14	Milenko Sebić	Serbia	99	99	97	100	97	95	587-27x	
15	Tomasz Bartnik	Poland	99	98	99	97	94	99	586-35x	
16	Lucas Kryzs	France	99	98	100	99	96	94	586-34x	
17	Andreas Thum	Austria	97	97	100	99	95	98	586-31x	
18	Maciej Kowalewicz	Poland	98	97	99	100	95	97	586-30x	
19	István Péni	Hungary	96	98	100	99	97	96	586-27x	
20	Maximilian Dallinger	Germany	97	99	98	99	97	95	585-29x	
21	David Koenders	Germany	97	98	99	97	95	99	585-26x	
22	Patrik Jány	Slovakia	97	97	97	99	98	97	585-26x	
23	Jan Lochbihler	Switzerland	96	99	100	100	97	92	584-34x	
24	Michael Bargeron	Great Britain	96	98	99	100	95	96	584-33x	
25	Christoph Dürr	Switzerland	96	100	100	100	95	92	583-35x	
26	Brian Baudouin	France	95	99	99	96	97	97	583-31x	
27	Milutin Stefanović	Serbia	96	97	98	100	96	96	583-27x	
28	Meelis Kiisk	Estonia	99	96	97	100	97	94	583-24x	
29	Ondrej Holko	Slovakia	96	97	98	99	95	97	582-29x	
30	Steffen Halfdan Olsen	Denmark	98	98	100	98	91	95	580-33x	
31	Oleh Tsarkov	Ukraine	94	97	98	100	97	94	580-29x	
32	Karolis Girulis	Lithuania	95	96	99	96	97	94	577-24x	
33	Robert Markoja	Slovenia	94	99	98	98	95	91	575-22x	

=== Ranking match ===
Rank	Athlete	Kneeling		Prone		Standing				Total	Notes
Rank	Athlete	1	2	1	2	1	2	3	4	Total	Notes
1	Jiří Přívratský (CZE)	51.2	51.3	50.5	52.8	51.7	50.9	50.2	51.0	409.6	QG
2	Zalán Pekler (HUN)	50.8	51.6	51.3	53.3	50.7	51.0	49.4	48.9	407.0	QG
3rd place, bronze medalist(s)	Alexander Schmirl (AUT)	51.0	51.1	51.5	53.1	49.7	50.1	50.6	49.7	406.8	
4	Simon Kolstad Claussen (NOR)	52.7	51.9	51.9	52.5	50.0	47.7	48.7	48.7	404.1	
5	Jon-Hermann Hegg (NOR)	51.0	52.3	52.1	51.7	48.9	48.4	50.8		355.2	
6	Marcus Madsen (SWE)	49.4	51.0	51.3	51.4	48.4	50.3	49.6		351.4	
7	Simon Weithaler (ITA)	51.2	50.3	50.6	51.9	47.0	50.4			301.4	
8	Petar Gorša (CRO)	51.7	50.5	48.8	51.4	49.1	49.8			301.3	

=== Gold medal match ===
Rank	Athlete	Shot													Total
Rank	Athlete	1	2	3	4	5	6	7	8	9	10	11	12	13	Total
1st place, gold medalist(s)	Zalán Pekler (HUN)	10.5	9.7	9.3	10.6	9.7	10.2	10.2	10.5	10.1	10.6	10.3	10.1	10.4	16
2nd place, silver medalist(s)	Jiří Přívratský (CZE)	10.4	10.2	9.7	9.7	10.4	10.0	9.5	10.1	10.7	10.3	9.1	10.6	9.7	10
