= Shooting at the 2020 Summer Olympics – Men's 50 metre rifle three positions =

Olympic shooting event

Men's 50 metre rifle three positions at the Games of the XXXII Olympiad
- Olympic shooting pictogram
- Venue: Asaka Shooting Range
- Dates: 2 August 2021
- Competitors: 39 from 27 nations
- Winning score: 466.0

Medalists
1st place, gold medalist(s)		Zhang Changhong	China
2nd place, silver medalist(s)		Sergey Kamenskiy	ROC
3rd place, bronze medalist(s)		Milenko Sebić	Serbia

The men's 50 metre rifle three positions event at the 2020 Summer Olympics took place on 2 August 2021 at the Asaka Shooting Range, near Tokyo in Japan.

== Records ==
Prior to this competition, the existing world and Olympic records were as follows.

Qualifying records
World record	Jan Lochbihler (SUI)	1188	Rio de Janeiro, Brazil	28 August 2019
Olympic record	Sergey Kamenskiy (RUS)	1184	Rio de Janeiro, Brazil	14 August 2016

Final records
World record	Yang Haoran (CHN)	465.3	Munich, Germany	25 May 2018
Olympic record	Niccolò Campriani (ITA)	458.8	Rio de Janeiro, Brazil	14 August 2016

== Schedule ==
All times are Japan Standard Time (UTC+9)

Date	Time	Round
Monday, 2 August 2021	11:30	Qualification
Monday, 2 August 2021	16:50	Final

== Results ==
=== Qualification ===
Rank	Athlete	Country	Kneeling	Prone	Standing	Total	Notes
1	Sergey Kamenskiy	ROC	394	398	391	1183-78x	Q
2	Zhang Changhong	China	392	398	393	1183-67x	Q
3	Jon-Hermann Hegg	Norway	395	397	389	1181-64x	Q
4	Milenko Sebić	Serbia	394	399	387	1180-64x	Q
5	Miran Maričić	Croatia	393	397	388	1178-66x	Q
6	Serhiy Kulish	Ukraine	393	398	387	1178-60x	Q
7	Petar Gorša	Croatia	392	397	387	1176-70x	Q
8	Yury Shcherbatsevich	Belarus	392	398	386	1176-55x	Q
9	Henrik Larsen	Norway	398	400	377	1175-70x	
10	István Péni	Hungary	391	397	385	1173-64x	
11	Zhao Zhonghao	China	392	397	384	1173-64x	
12	Patrick Sunderman	United States	393	398	381	1172-63x	
13	Patrik Jány	Slovakia	390	391	391	1172-61x	
14	Yuriy Yurkov	Kazakhstan	390	395	387	1172-60x	
15	Tomasz Bartnik	Poland	394	394	383	1171-56x	
16	Jiří Přívratský	Czech Republic	385	396	388	1169-68x	
17	Petr Nymburský	Czech Republic	385	399	385	1169-62x	
18	Zalán Pekler	Hungary	393	395	381	1169-56x	
19	Marco De Nicolo	Italy	396	393	379	1168-60x	
20	Mahyar Sedaghat	Iran	388	392	388	1168-56x	
21	Aishwary Pratap Singh Tomar	India	397	391	379	1167-63x	
22	Oleh Tsarkov	Ukraine	388	396	382	1166-51x	
23	Milutin Stefanović	Serbia	387	391	386	1164-57x	
24	Kim Sang-do	South Korea	384	390	390	1164-53x	
25	Karolis Girulis	Lithuania	385	393	385	1163-50x	
26	Nick Mowrer	United States	391	397	374	1162-63x	
27	Dane Sampson	Australia	383	397	382	1162-45x	
28	Steffen Olsen	Denmark	388	391	381	1160-53x	
29	Jack Rossiter	Australia	382	392	386	1160-40x	
30	Lorenzo Bacci	Italy	384	392	383	1159-49x	
31	Naoya Okada	Japan	388	390	380	1158-44x	
32	Sanjeev Rajput	India	387	393	377	1157-55x	
33	José Luis Sánchez	Mexico	387	391	376	1154-48x	
34	Alexis Eberhardt	Argentina	382	391	379	1152-50x	
35	Hamed Al-Khatri	Oman	382	392	374	1148-42x	
36	Ömer Akgün	Turkey	373	390	384	1147-40x	
37	Takayuki Matsumoto	Japan	373	391	381	1145-42x	
38	Osama El-Saeid	Egypt	367	392	380	1139-37x	
39	Julio Iemma	Venezuela	376	388	368	1132-41x	

=== Final ===
Rank	Athlete	Series													Total	Notes
Rank	Athlete	Kneeling			Prone			Standing							Total	Notes
Rank	Athlete	1	2	3	4	5	6	7	8	9s41	9s42	9s43	9s44	9s45	Total	Notes
1st place, gold medalist(s)	Zhang Changhong (CHN)	52.5	103.5	155.6	208.3	260.0	312.6	362.2	413.6	423.9	434.5	445.4	455.7	466.0	466.0	WR, OR
2nd place, silver medalist(s)	Sergey Kamenskiy (ROC)	49.2	101.0	154.0	206.6	259.6	311.8	363.1	412.9	423.2	433.5	443.6	454.1	464.2	464.2	
3rd place, bronze medalist(s)	Milenko Sebić (SRB)	51.9	102.8	153.1	204.7	257.2	308.9	359.0	408.7	419.2	428.7	438.7	448.2	—	448.2	
4	Jon-Hermann Hegg (NOR)	50.5	102.1	153.1	204.5	257.6	309.3	359.3	408.4	417.9	428.0	438.0	—		438.0	
5	Petar Gorša (CRO)	49.3	100.7	151.1	202.9	254.4	306.4	356.2	407.2	417.4	427.2	—			427.2	
6	Miran Maričić (CRO)	50.0	100.5	150.2	201.5	251.7	303.5	354.1	406.5	416.2	—				416.2	
7	Yury Shcherbatsevich (BLR)	51.6	103.9	155.5	207.1	259.4	311.5	358.3	406.3	—					406.3	
8	Serhiy Kulish (UKR)	50.0	102.1	154.7	207.5	258.8	310.6	351.3	402.2	—					402.2	
