= Serbia at the 2023 European Games =

- IOC code: SRB
- NOC: Olympic Committee of Serbia
- Website: www.oks.org.rs

in Kraków and Małopolska, Poland 21 June – 2 July 2023
- Competitors: 122 in 16 sports
- Flag bearers: Marko Novaković and Milica Novaković (opening)
- Medals Ranked 22nd: Gold 3 Silver 6 Bronze 7 Total 16

European Games appearances (overview)
- 2015; 2019; 2023; 2027

Serbia participated at the 2023 European Games, in Kraków, Poland from 21 June to 2 July 2023.

The Olympic Committee of Serbia sent a total of 122 athletes to the Games.

== Medalists ==
Medal	Name	Sport	Event	Date
Gold	Milica Gardašević	Athletics	Women's long jump	25 June
Gold	Aleksandra Perišić	Taekwondo	Women's 67 kg	25 June
Gold	Aleksandra Krstić	Kickboxing	Women's full contact -52 kg	2 July
Silver	Milica Novaković	Canoe sprint	Women's K-1 200 metres	23 June
Silver	Nadica Božanić	Taekwondo	Women's 73 kg	26 June
Silver	Nikola Mitro; Maja Umićević	Teqball	Mixed doubles	30 June
Silver	Natalia Shadrina	Boxing	Women's 60kg - lightweight	1 July
Silver	Nikola Mitro; Bogdan Marojević	Teqball	Men's doubles	2 July
Silver	Vahid Abasov	Boxing	Men's 71kg - welterweight	2 July
Bronze	Marko Dragosavljević; Ervin Holpert	Canoe sprint	Men's K-2 500 metres	22 June
Bronze	Anđelo Džombeta; Marko Novaković; Vladimir Torubarov; Stefan Vrdoljak	Canoe sprint	Men's K-4 500 m	23 June
Bronze	Marko Dragosavljević	Canoe sprint	Men's K-1 500 metres	24 June
Bronze	Milica Novaković	Canoe sprint	Women's K-1 500 metres	24 June
Bronze	Stefan Takov	Taekwondo	Men's 74 kg	25 June
Bronze	Lazar Kovačević; Milenko Sebić; Milutin Stefanović	Shooting	Men's team 50m air rifle three positions	29 June
Bronze	Aleksandar Konovalov	Kickboxing	Men's full contact -75 kg	1 July

Medals by sport
Sport	1st place, gold medalist(s)	2nd place, silver medalist(s)	3rd place, bronze medalist(s)	Total
Taekwondo	1	1	1	3
Kickboxing	1	0	1	2
Athletics	1	0	0	1
Boxing	0	2	0	2
Teqball	0	2	0	2
Canoe sprint	0	1	4	5
Shooting	0	0	1	1
Total	3	6	7	16

== Competitors ==
Sport	Men	Women	Total
3x3 Basketball	4	0	4
Artistic swimming	1	2	3
Athletics	19	22	41
Badminton	1	2	3
Boxing	5	6	11
Canoe slalom	3	0	3
Canoe sprint	7	4	11
Diving	1	0	1
Fencing	1	4	5
Judo	6	5	10
Kickboxing	1	2	3
Shooting	6	4	10
Table tennis	2	2	4
Taekwondo	2	5	7
Teqball	2	2	4
Triathlon	1	0	1
Total	62	60	122

== 3x3 Basketball ==
=== Men's tournament ===
- Vuk Borovčanin
- Nikola Kovačević
- Marko Milaković
- Đuro Dautović

Group play

Pos	Team	Pld	W	L	PF	Qualification
1	Poland (H)	3	2 (Note: Poland 1–1, Germany 1–1, Estonia 1–1, ranked by points scored.)	1	61	Quarterfinals
2	Germany	3	2	1	58	Quarterfinals
3	Estonia	3	2	1	54	
4	Serbia	3	0	3	50	

Source: EG2023
Rules for classification: 1) Wins; 2) Head-to-head record; 3) Points scored.
(H) Host
Notes:

21 June 2023
15:20

Boxscore

Serbia	16–17	Estonia
Pts: Milaković 9		Pts: Kivi, Metsalu 5

Cracovia Arena, Kraków

21 June 2023
17:10

Boxscore

Serbia	16–19	Germany
Pts: Milaković 8		Pts: Agyeman 9

Cracovia Arena, Kraków

23 June 2023
21:35

Boxscore

Poland	20–18 (OT)	Serbia
Pts: Bogucki 9		Pts: Milaković 7

Cracovia Arena, Kraków

== Artistic swimming ==
=== Mixed ===
Athlete	Event	Final	
Athlete	Event	Points	Rank
Ivan Martinović; Jelena Kontić	Duet technical	174.8467	5
Ivan Martinović; Jelena Kontić	Duet Free	144.1104	4

== Athletics ==
=== Men ===
==== Track events ====
Athlete	Event	Second division			Final standing
Athlete	Event	Result	Position	Match points	Final standing
Aleksa Kijanović	100 metres	10.41 SB	5	12	—N/a
Boško Kijanović	200 metres	21.01 SB	7	10	—N/a
Boško Kijanović	400 metres	45.97	5	12	—N/a
Aleksa Milanović	800 metres	1:50.76 PB	14	3	—N/a
Elzan Bibić	1500 metres	3:41.35	1	16	—N/a
Elzan Bibić	5000 metres	13:53.95 SB	1	16	—N/a
Miloš Milosavljević	3000 metres steeplechase	10:26.43	16	1	—N/a
Bogdan Vidojković	110 metres hurdles	13.98	5	12	—N/a
Nikola Kostić	400 metres hurdles	49.77	4	13	—N/a
Danilo Majstorović; Boško Kijanović; Stefan Kaljuš; Aleksa Kijanović	4 x 100 metres relay	39.99 SB	7	10	—N/a

==== Field events ====
Athlete	Event	Second division			Final standing
Athlete	Event	Result	Position	Match points	Final standing
Slavko Stević	High jump	2.24 PB	2	15	—N/a
Luka Tomić	Pole vault	3.40	14	3	—N/a
Strahinja Jovančević	Long jump	7.66	6	12	—N/a
Aleksa Ratinac	Triple jump	13.66	15	2	—N/a
Armin Sinančević	Shot put	20.42	3	14	—N/a
Petar Ilić	Discus throw	46.42	14	3	—N/a
Jovan Stranić	Hammer throw	66.55	10	7	—N/a
Vedran Samac	Javelin throw	67.70	13	4	—N/a

=== Women ===
==== Track events ====
Athlete	Event	Second division			Final standing
Athlete	Event	Result	Position	Match points	Final standing
Ivana Ilić	100 metres	11.47 SB	4	13	—N/a
Ivana Ilić	200 metres	23.53	7	10	—N/a
Maja Ćirić	400 metres	53.69 SB	9	8	—N/a
Marija Stambolić	800 metres	2:07.82 SB	12	5	—N/a
Saima Murić	1500 metres	4:29.35	13	4	—N/a
Mejra Mehmedović	5000 metres	18:15.32 SB	16	1	—N/a
Milica Tomašević	3000 metres steeplechase	10:50.25 PB	10	7	—N/a
Milica Emini	100 metres hurdles	13.28	6	11	—N/a
Dragana Macanović	400 metres hurdles	1:01.51	11	6	—N/a
Tamara Milutinović; Ivana Ilić; Katarina Vreta; Milana Tirnanić	4 x 100 metres relay	DQ			—N/a

==== Field events ====
Athlete	Event	Second division			Final standing
Athlete	Event	Result	Position	Match points	Final standing
Angelina Topić	High jump	1.91	3	14	—N/a
Olivera Kanazir	Pole vault	3.05 SB	12	5	—N/a
Milica Gardašević	Long jump	6.82	1	16	1st place, gold medalist(s)
Teodora Boberić	Triple jump	NM			—N/a
Mirjana Dasović	Shot put	13.64	11	6	—N/a
Milica Poznanović	Discus throw	52.39 PB	7	10	—N/a
Aleksandra Ivanović	Hammer throw	58.08	11	6	—N/a
Adriana Vilagoš	Javelin throw	58.93	4	13	—N/a

=== Mixed ===
==== Track events ====
Athlete	Event	Second division			Final standing
Athlete	Event	Result	Position	Match points	Final standing
Nikola Kostić; Aleksandra Pešić; Ivan Marković; Maja Ćirić	4 x 400 metres relay	3:21.27 SB	9	8	—N/a

== Badminton ==
=== Women ===
Athlete	Event	Group Stage				Elimination	Quarterfinal	Semifinal	Final / BM	
Athlete	Event	Opposition Score	Opposition Score	Opposition Score	Rank	Opposition Score	Opposition Score	Opposition Score	Opposition Score	Rank
Marija Sudimac	Singles	Qi (FRA); L 0–2	Darragh (IRL); L 1–2	Švábíková (CZE); L 0–2	4	Did not advance				24

=== Mixed ===
Athlete	Event	Group Stage				Quarterfinal	Semifinal	Final / BM	
Athlete	Event	Opposition Score	Opposition Score	Opposition Score	Rank	Opposition Score	Opposition Score	Opposition Score	Rank
Mihajlo Tomić; Anđela Vitman	Doubles	Kristensen / Hong (NOR); W 2–0	Christiansen / Bøje (DEN); L 0–2	Pham / Racloz (SUI); W 2–0	2 Q	Gicquel / Delrue (FRA); L 0–2	Did not advance		5

== Boxing ==
=== Men ===
Athlete	Event	Round of 32	Round of 16	Quarterfinals	Semifinals	Final	
Athlete	Event	Opposition Result	Opposition Result	Opposition Result	Opposition Result	Opposition Result	Rank
Omer Ametović	51kg - flyweight	Bye	Vranješ (BIH); W RSC-R2	MacDonald (GBR); L 0–5	Did not advance		5
Aleksej Šendrik	63.5kg - lightweight	Abou-Arab (DEN); W 5–0	Paraschiv (MDA); W 3–2	Kovács (HUN); L 0–5	Did not advance		5
Vahid Abasov	71kg - welterweight	Ishchenko (ISR); W 5–0	Kiwan (BUL); W 3–2	Madoyan (ARM); W 4–1	Traore (FRA); W 5–0	Terteryan (DEN); L 1–4	2nd place, silver medalist(s)
Vladimir Mironchikov	80kg - middleweight	Akilov (HUN); W 3–2	Hakobyan (ARM); L 2–3	Did not advance			9
Vladan Babić	+92kg - super heavyweight	Chaloyan (ARM); L 0–5	Did not advance				17

=== Women ===
Athlete	Event	Round of 32	Round of 16	Quarterfinals	Semifinals	Final	
Athlete	Event	Opposition Result	Opposition Result	Opposition Result	Opposition Result	Opposition Result	Rank
Nina Radovanović	50kg - flyweight	Bye	Mezei (HUN); W 5–0	Sorrentino (ITA); L 1–4	Did not advance		5
Sara Ćirković	54kg - bantamweight	Lehane (IRL); L 2–3	Did not advance				17
Anđela Branković	57kg - featherweight	Glynn (GBR); L 0–5	Did not advance				17
Natalia Shadrina	60kg - lightweight	Bye	Mesiano (ITA); W 5–0	Beram (CRO); W 5–0	Özer (TUR); W 4–1	Harrington (IRL); L 0–5	2nd place, silver medalist(s)
Milena Matović	66kg - welterweight	Broadhurst (IRL); L 0–5	Did not advance				17
Nikolina Gajić	75kg - middleweight	Bye	Holgersson (SWE); L 0–5	Did not advance			9

== Canoe slalom ==
=== Men ===
Athlete	Event	Preliminary						Semifinal		Final	
Athlete	Event	Run 1	Rank	Run 2	Rank	Best	Rank	Time	Rank	Time	Rank
Vuk Bazić	K-1	105.13	51	105.19	26	105.13	56	Did not advance			
Marko Đorđević	K-1	100.78	48	158.13	33	100.78	63	Did not advance			
Miloš Jevtić	K-1	111.71	54	101.88	23	101.88	53	Did not advance			
Vuk Bazić; Marko Đorđević; Miloš Jevtić	K-1 team	—N/a								135.12	12

== Canoe sprint ==
=== Men ===
Athlete	Event	Heats		Semifinals		Finals	
Athlete	Event	Time	Rank	Time	Rank	Time	Rank
Marko Dragosavljević	K1 200 m	34.494 GB	1 FA	bye		37.209	4
Marko Dragosavljević	K1 500 m	1:39.783	1 FA	bye		1:37.806	3rd place, bronze medalist(s)
Marko Dragosavljević; Ervin Holpert	K2 500 m	1:43.561	1 FA	bye		1:29.855	3rd place, bronze medalist(s)
Anđelo Džombeta; Marko Novaković; Vladimir Torubarov; Stefan Vrdoljak	K4 500 m	1:23.355	6 QS	1:22.498	2 FA	1:20.800	3rd place, bronze medalist(s)

=== Women ===
Athlete	Event	Heats		Semifinals		Finals	
Athlete	Event	Time	Rank	Time	Rank	Time	Rank
Tijana Arsić	C1 200 m	51.934	7 QS	52.020	7	Did not advance	
Milica Novaković	K1 200 m	40.685	4 QS	41.331	1 FA	41.006	2nd place, silver medalist(s)
Milica Novaković	K1 500 m	1:55.103	2 QS	1:53.535	2 FA	1:50.892	3rd place, bronze medalist(s)
Kristina Bedeč; Marija Dostanić	K2 500 m	1:43.561	5 QS	1:45.209	3 FA	1:45.688	8

=== Mixed ===
Athlete	Event	Heats		Semifinals		Finals	
Athlete	Event	Time	Rank	Time	Rank	Time	Rank
Marija Dostanić; Bojan Zdelar	K2 200 m	36.149	5 QS	35.659	4 FB	35.956	14

== Diving ==
=== Men ===
Athlete	Event	Preliminaries		Final	
Athlete	Event	Points	Rank	Points	Rank
Nikola Paraušić	1m springboard	221.70	31	Did not advance	
Nikola Paraušić	3m springboard	254.35	28	Did not advance	

== Fencing ==
=== Men ===
Athlete	Event	Individual Group			Round of 64	Round of 32	Round of 16	Quarterfinals	Semifinals	Final / BM	
Athlete	Event	W	L	Position	Opposition Result	Opposition Result	Opposition Result	Opposition Result	Opposition Result	Opposition Result	Rank
Veljko Ćuk	Foil	6	0	1st	Bye	Moritz (AUT); L 5–15	Did not advance				17

=== Women ===
Athlete	Event	Individual Group			Round of 64	Round of 32	Round of 16	Quarterfinals	Semifinals	Final / BM	
Athlete	Event	W	L	Position	Opposition Result	Opposition Result	Opposition Result	Opposition Result	Opposition Result	Opposition Result	Rank
Jana Grijak	Épée	1	5	6th	Did not advance						64
Marta Grijak	Épée	2	4	6th	Did not advance						57
Katarina Knežević	Épée	3	3	4th	Prosina (LAT); L 11–12	Did not advance					49
Anđela Miličić	Épée	3	3	3rd	Wimmer (HUN); L 9–15	Did not advance					43
Jana Grijak; Marta Grijak; Katarina Knežević; Anđela Miličić	Team épée	—N/a				Georgia; L 12–17	Did not advance				18

== Judo ==
=== Mixed ===
Athlete	Event	Round of 32	Round of 16	Quarterfinals	Semifinals	Repechage	Final / BM	
Athlete	Event	Opposition Score	Opposition Score	Opposition Score	Opposition Score	Opposition Score	Opposition Score	Rank
Filip Jovanović; Nemanja Majdov; Darko Brašnjović; Bojan Došen; Igor Vračar; Marica Perišić; Tea Tintor; Jovana Bunčić; Milica Žabić; Milica Cvijić; Strahinja Bunčić	Team	Romania; L 1–4	Did not advance					17

== Kickboxing ==
=== Men ===
Athlete	Event	Quarterfinals	Semifinals	Final	
Athlete	Event	Opposition Result	Opposition Result	Opposition Result	Rank
Aleksandar Konovalov	Full contact -75 kg	Carr (IRL); W 3–0	Brykov (UKR); L 0–3	Did not advance	3rd place, bronze medalist(s)

=== Women ===
Athlete	Event	Quarterfinals	Semifinals	Final	
Athlete	Event	Opposition Result	Opposition Result	Opposition Result	Rank
Jasmina Nađ	Full contact -52 kg	Dimitrova (BUL); L 0–3	Did not advance		5
Aleksandra Krstić	Full contact -70 kg	Chatzigeorgiou (GRE); W 3–0	Zec (CRO); W 3–0	Sodjinou (GER); W 2–1	1st place, gold medalist(s)

== Shooting ==
=== Men ===
Athlete	Event	Qualification 1		Qualification 2		Final / BM	
Athlete	Event	Points	Rank	Points	Rank	Points	Rank
Damir Mikec	10m air pistol	582	3 Q	—N/a		245.5	4
Dimitrije Grgić	10m air pistol	572	25	—N/a		Did not advance	
Lazar Kovačević	10m air rifle	628.1	13	—N/a		Did not advance	
Milutin Stefanović	10m air rifle	627.6	20	—N/a		Did not advance	
Milutin Stefanović	50m air rifle three positions	583	27	—N/a		Did not advance	
Milenko Sebić	50m air rifle three positions	587	14	—N/a		Did not advance	
Dimitrije Grgić; Dusko Petrov; Damir Mikec	Team 10m air pistol	857	7 Q	569	6	Did not advance	
Lazar Kovačević; Milenko Sebić; Milutin Stefanović	Team 10m air rifle	937.9	9	Did not advance			
Lazar Kovačević; Milenko Sebić; Milutin Stefanović	Team 50m air rifle three positions	1315	5 Q	879	4 Q	Norway; W 16–12	3rd place, bronze medalist(s)

=== Women ===
Athlete	Event	Qualification 1		Qualification 2		Final / BM	
Athlete	Event	Points	Rank	Points	Rank	Points	Rank
Zorana Arunović	10m air pistol	575	7 Q	—N/a		146.8	7
Teodora Vukojević	10m air rifle	626.1	22	—N/a		Did not advance	
Ivana Maksimović	10m air rifle	626.8	19	—N/a		Did not advance	
Andrea Arsović	50m air rifle three positions	581	20	—N/a		Did not advance	
Teodora Vukojević	50m air rifle three positions	594	1 Q	—N/a		356.3	6
Ivana Maksimović; Andrea Arsović; Teodora Vukojević	Team 10m air rifle	933.3	10	Did not advance			
Ivana Maksimović; Andrea Arsović; Teodora Vukojević	Team 50m air rifle three positions	1335	1 Q	872	5	Did not advance	

=== Mixed ===
Athlete	Event	Qualification 1		Qualification 2		Final / BM	
Athlete	Event	Points	Rank	Points	Rank	Opposition Result	Rank
Lazar Kovačević; Teodora Vukojević	Team 10m air rifle	626.8	12	—N/a		Did not advance	
Milutin Stefanović; Ivana Maksimović	Team 10m air rifle	625.6	18	—N/a		Did not advance	
Andrea Arsović; Milenko Sebić	Team 50m air rifle three positions	869	17	Did not advance			
Milutin Stefanović; Teodora Vukojević	Team 50m air rifle three positions	880	6 Q	571	8	Did not advance	
Damir Mikec; Zorana Arunović	Team 10m air pistol	574	9	—N/a		Did not advance	

== Table tennis ==
=== Men ===
Athlete	Event	Round 1	Round 2	Round 3	Round of 16	Quarterfinals	Semifinals	Final / BM	
Athlete	Event	Opposition Score	Opposition Score	Opposition Score	Opposition Score	Opposition Score	Opposition Score	Opposition Score	Rank
Dimitrije Levajac	Singles	Bye	Freitas (POR); L 0–4	Did not advance					33
Zsolt Peto	Singles	Mongiusti (SMR); W 4–1	Ionescu (ROM); L 0–4	Did not advance					33

=== Women ===
Athlete	Event	Round 1	Round 2	Round 3	Round of 16	Quarterfinals	Semifinals	Final / BM	
Athlete	Event	Opposition Score	Opposition Score	Opposition Score	Opposition Score	Opposition Score	Opposition Score	Opposition Score	Rank
Izabela Lupulesku	Singles	Bye	Toliou (GRE); L 1–4	Did not advance					33
Sabina Šurjan	Singles	Bye	Stražar (SLO); W 4–0	Bergström (SWE); L 1–4	Did not advance				17

=== Mixed ===
Athlete	Event	Round of 16	Quarterfinals	Semifinals	Final / BM	
Athlete	Event	Opposition Score	Opposition Score	Opposition Score	Opposition Score	Rank
Dimitrije Levajac; Izabela Lupulesku	Doubles	Polanský/Matelová (CZE); W 3–2	Robles/Xiao (ESP); L 2–3	Did not advance		5

== Taekwondo ==
=== Men ===
Athlete	Event	Round of 16	Quarterfinals	Semifinals	Repechage	Bronze medal	Final	
Athlete	Event	Opposition Result	Opposition Result	Opposition Result	Opposition Result	Opposition Result	Opposition Result	Rank
Novak Stanić	63 kg	Özkaya (GER); W 2–1	Brečić (CRO); L 0–2	Did not advance	Pilavakis (CYP); W 2–0	Jorquera (ESP); L 1–2	Did not advance	5
Stefan Takov	74 kg	Bouthouyak (FRA); W 2–0	Gafarov (AZE); W 2–0	Kintsurashvili (GEO); L 0–2	—N/a	Binev (BUL); W 2–1	Did not advance	3rd place, bronze medalist(s)

=== Women ===
Athlete	Event	Round of 16	Quarterfinals	Semifinals	Repechage	Bronze medal	Final	
Athlete	Event	Opposition Result	Opposition Result	Opposition Result	Opposition Result	Opposition Result	Opposition Result	Rank
Lana Komnenović	46 kg	Pouryounes (ROT); L 1–2	Did not advance					11
Tijana Bogdanović	53 kg	McKew (GBR); L 1–2	Did not advance					11
Nađa Savković	62 kg	Tarvida (LAT); L 1–2	Did not advance					11
Aleksandra Perišić	67 kg	Faber (LUX); W 2–0	Jirankova (CZE); W 2–0	Jelić (CRO); W 2–1	—N/a		Castro Burgos (ESP); W 2–0	1st place, gold medalist(s)
Nadica Božanić	73 kg	Bye	Smiraglia (ITA); W 2–1	Berišaj (MNE); W 2–0	—N/a		Uzunçavdar (TUR); L 0–2	2nd place, silver medalist(s)

== Teqball ==
=== Men ===
Athlete	Event	Group Stage			Quarterfinals	Semifinals	Final / BM	
Athlete	Event	Opposition Score	Opposition Score	Rank	Opposition Score	Opposition Score	Opposition Score	Rank
Bogdan Marojević	Singles	Shabani (ALB); W 2–0	Bubniak (CZE); W 2–1	1 Q	Bányik (HUN); L 1–2	Did not advance		5
Nikola Mitro; Bogdan Marojević	Doubles	Italy; W 2–0	Moldova; W 2–0	1 Q	Armenia; W 2–0	Romania; W 2–0	Hungary; L 1–2	2nd place, silver medalist(s)

=== Women ===
Athlete	Event	Group Stage				Quarterfinals	Semifinals	Final / BM	
Athlete	Event	Opposition Score	Opposition Score	Opposition Score	Rank	Opposition Score	Opposition Score	Opposition Score	Rank
Anastasija Lemajić	Singles	Sommer (AUT); L 1–2	Vranić (CRO); W 2–0	Janicsek (HUN); L 0–2	3	Did not advance			
Maja Umićević; Anastasija Lemajić	Doubles	Moldova; W 2–1	Poland; L 0–2	Austria; W 2–1	2 Q	Romania; L 0–2	Did not advance		5

=== Mixed ===
Athlete	Event	Group Stage				Quarterfinals	Semifinals	Final / BM	
Athlete	Event	Opposition Score	Opposition Score	Opposition Score	Rank	Opposition Score	Opposition Score	Opposition Score	Rank
Nikola Mitro; Maja Umićević	Doubles	Armenia; W 2–0	Ukraine; W 2–0	Croatia; W 2–0	1 Q	Portugal; W 2–0	Poland; W 2–0	Hungary; L 0–2	2nd place, silver medalist(s)

== Triathlon ==
=== Men ===
Athlete	Event	Swim (1.5 km)	Trans 1	Bike (40 km)	Trans 2	Run (10 km)	Total Time	Rank
Ognjen Stojanović	Individual	19:01	0:59	57:33	0:31	32:43	1:50:44	36
