= Bartnick =

Bartnick is a surname, a Germanized or Americanized form of the Polish surname Bartnik, meaning "bee keeper". Notable people with the surname include:

- Günther Bartnick (1949–2023), German retired biathlete
- Joe Bartnick, American comedian, actor, and writer

== See also ==
- Bartnik
- Bortnick
