= Bartnik =

Bartnik is a surname of Polish origin, meaning "bee keeper". Notable people with the surname include:

- Robert Bartnik (1956–2022), Australian mathematician
- Tomasz Bartnik (born 1990), Polish sport shooter
- Wojciech Bartnik (born 1967), Polish former southpaw boxer

== See also ==
- Bartnick
- Bortnik
