= Bortnik =

Bortnik (Belarusian: Бортнік, Russian: Бортник, Ukrainian: Бортник, Bortnyk) is an East Slavic-language surname. The historical meaning of the surname is beekeeper.

It is also a Polish surname, under Ukrainian influence (The native Polish word for the occupation is Bartnik).

Notable people with the surname include:

- Aída Bortnik (1938–2013), Argentine screenwriter
- Bogdan Bortnik (born 1992), Ukrainian footballer
- Ivan Bortnik (1939–2019), Russian actor
- Maksim Bortnik (born 1987), Ukrainian film director
- Mykola Bortnyk, Ukrainian chess player
- Olexandr Bortnyk, Ukrainian chess player
- Roman Bortnyk, Ukrainian Soviet military commander, Hero of the Soviet Union

== See also ==
- Bortnikov, a Russian surname of the same origin
- Bortnick, an Americanized version of Bortnik
- Bortnyik, Hungarian version of Bortnik
