= Bortnick =

Bortnick is a surname, being an Americanized form of Bortnik, which originated in Ukraine and Belarus as an occupational name for a beekeeper. Notable people with the surname include:

- Avi Bortnick (born 1963), American guitarist
- Ethan Bortnick (born 2000), American pianist, singer, songwriter, record producer, and musician

== See also ==
- Bartnick
