= Battleground Earth =

- Genre: Reality Television
- Country of origin: United States
- Original language: English
- No. of seasons: 1
- No. of episodes: 10 (list of episodes)

Production
- Production locations: Dallas, Texas, United States
- Production company: The Greif Company

Original release
- Network: Planet Green
- Release: August 3 – October 12, 2008

Battleground Earth was a 2008 television series on Planet Green hosted by rock star Tommy Lee and rapper Ludacris.

== Show premise ==
The series is set on the road in a 10-city tour across America, told in 10 episodes, in which Ludacris and Tommy Lee (and their respective teams) battle against each other to see who can keep their act “more green" focusing on environmental consciousness. Throughout the tour they also battle to get the word out about the state of the environment. The battle culminates in a “green” carpet benefit concert at the Greek Theatre in Los Angeles, California.

The winner of the 10-part battle gets to headline the concert while the loser faces shame as the opening act. The concert raised over $33,000 including a donation from Treeland, benefiting the renewal of Griffith Park which was devastated by recent wildfires. Musical acts featured in the benefit concert and final episode of the series include: Tommy Lee, Ludacris, Comedian Tommy Davidson, Train, Switchfoot, Billy Gibbons of ZZ Top with Slash and Duff McKagan, Ziggy Marley, The Blue Man Group, Robby Krieger of the Doors, Bowling for Soup, Dee Snider and Rock Star Supernova.

Ludacris's team is composed of

- Cousin SeSean Bridges
- Rapper Big Willie Box
- Rapper Tony “4 IZE” Hayes III

Tommy Lee's team is composed of

- Musician Johnny Colt
- MTV personality Dave “Diggity Dave” Aragon
- Musician Nina Bergman

The show also included several 30 second spots called “Pass it Ons”, featuring an eclectic group of celebrities who offer green tips to viewers. The “Pass it Ons” run during the shows throughout the 10-episode season. Some of the celebrities who recorded pass it ons include: Mike Rowe of the Discovery Channel show "Dirty Jobs", Maria Menounos of Access Hollywood, Hall of Fame basketball player Magic Johnson, comedian Wayne Brady, musician Travis Tritt, Gene Simmons and the other members of Kiss, musician Dee Snider and illusionist Criss Angel.

== Episode guide ==
Episode: 101 “Raise the Rood”
Challenge: Building solar structures
Guest Stars: Nikki Sixx, P. Diddy, Cedric the Entertainer, Members of Mötley Crüe, Questlove and The Roots, Isaiah Washington, Dr. John, Ivan Neville, Big Boi of Outkast and Paul Stanley of Kiss

Episode: 102 “Green Death”
Challenge: Greener Funerals
Guest Stars: Gene Simmons and members of Kiss, Mickey Hart & Bob Weir of the Grateful Dead, Jon Fishman of Phish, Summer Rayne Oakes, Paul Rodriguez, Craig Gass, Joe Bartnick, Joan Baez

Episode: 103 “Trash Talkin”
Challenge: Trash and Recycling, installing environmentally friendly artificial turf on a local sports field
Guest Stars: Daisy Fuentes, Too Short, Justin Fargas, Thomas Howard (American football), Kirk Morrison, Members of the Oakland Athletics

Episode: 104 “Fast Fuel”
Challenge: Make bio-fuel for the tour busses from using vegetable oil; visit a methane farm to turn cow manure into fuel to power a barbecue
Guest Stars: Michael Irvin, Meat Loaf, Flo Rida

Episode: 105 “You've Got Junk Mail”
Challenge: Collect junk mail for recycling
Guest Stars: Big Boi

Episode: 106 “Duel In The Desert”
Challenge:
Guest Stars:

Episode: 107 “Wet and Wild”
Challenge:
Guest Stars:

Episode: 108 “Heal the Bay”
Challenge:
Guest Stars:

Episode: 109 “Downtown Battleground”
Challenge:
Guest Stars:

Episode: 110 “Finale at the Greek”
Challenge:
Guest Stars:

== Production notes ==
Battleground Earth is produced for Planet Green by the production company, Greif Company.
