= Jung Ji-geun =

South Korean sport shooter

Jung Ji-guen (born January 10, 1990) is a South Korean sport shooter. He placed 43rd in the men's 10 metre air rifle event at the 2016 Summer Olympics.
