= Bortnikov =

Bortnikov (masculine, Russian: Бортников) or Bortnikova (feminine, Russian: Бортникова) is a Russian surname derived from the occupation of bortnik, 'beekeeper'. Notable people with the surname include:

- Alexander Bortnikov (born 1951), Russian official
- Gennadi Bortnikov (1939–2007), Russian and Soviet actor
- Igor Bortnikov (born 1989), Russian ice hockey player
- Svetlana Bortnikova (born 1997), Kazakh footballer

== Fictional characters ==
- From the Soviet film The Return of Vasili Bortnikov (1953)

== See also ==
- Bortnik
