= Joe Bartnick =

American comedian, actor, and writer

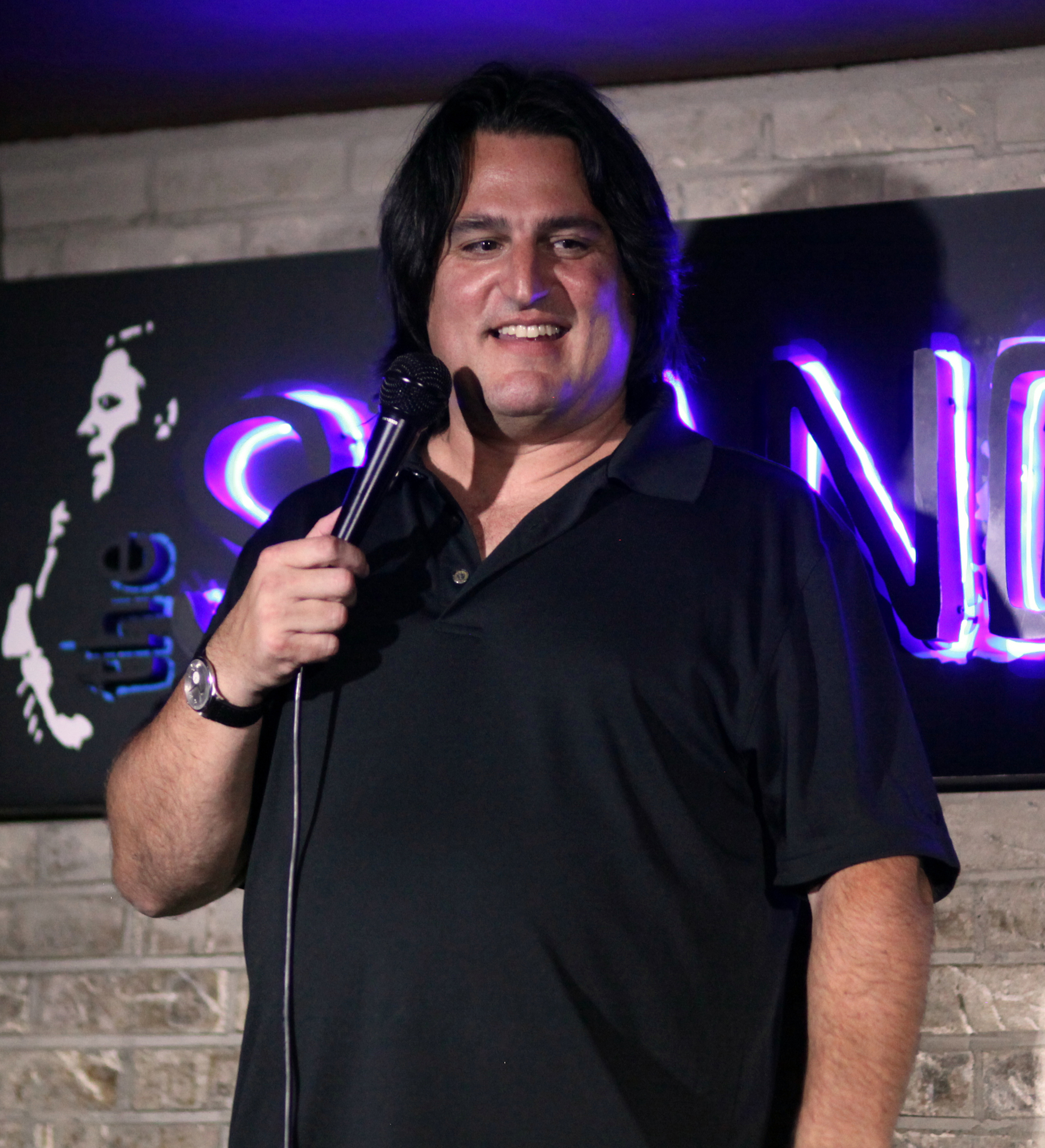
- Barnick performing in July 2016.
- Born: Pittsburgh, Pennsylvania, United States

Comedy career
- Years active: 1997–present
- Medium: Stand-up
- Website: joebartnick.com

Joe Bartnick is an American comedian, actor, and writer.

== Early life ==
Bartnick was born and raised in Pittsburgh, Pennsylvania. He lived in the South Hills and Bethel Park, and graduated from Seton-La Salle Catholic High School.

== Career ==
Bartnick moved to San Francisco and began his career as a stand-up comedian in 1997. He started performing in coffee shops and laundromats, and eventually went on to play venues such as Madison Square Garden, The Chicago Theater, The Warfield, the Punch Line, and the Palace of Fine Arts. During that time, he became a regular at The Punchline comedy club and shared the stage with comedians such as Dave Attell, Bill Burr, Dave Chappelle, and Robin Williams.

In 2006, Bartnick moved to Los Angeles and began writing and acting. He has written for many television projects including Dogg After Dark and Eddie Griffin: Going For Broke. As an actor, he starred in Dirty Jokes the Movie. He created and starred in the series King of Clubs. He roasted Tommy Lee on Lee's show Battleground Earth. In 2011, he published the best-selling E-book You Might Be a Douchebag. Since 2008, he has traveled the world opening for Lisa Lampanelli. In 2012, he began producing content for the National Hockey League Players' Association. Also in 2012, he released the CD Salute! Recorded in San Francisco. In 2013 he played a role in George Anton’s feature length motion picture Dead on Arrival starring Medicated Pete from the Howard Stern Show.

Joe Bartnick is the co-host and creator of the podcast PuckOff and can be heard weekly talking all things hockey.
