= Ole Martin Halvorsen =

Norwegian sport shooter (born 2000)

Personal information
- Born: 11 February 2000 (age 26) Bergen, Norway
- Home town: Kløfta, Norway

Sport
- Sport: Shooting
- Events: 50 m rifle prone; 50 m rifle three positions; 10 m air rifle
- Club: Kisen
Medal record
World Championships
Gold medal – first place	2023 Baku	50 m rifle prone team
Silver medal – second place	2025 Cairo	50 m rifle 3 positions team
Silver medal – second place	2026 Doha	50 m rifle 3 positions team
Bronze medal – third place	2023 Baku	50 m rifle 3 positions team
Bronze medal – third place	2025 Cairo	50 m rifle prone team
European Championships
Gold medal – first place	2025 Osijek	10 m air rifle team
Gold medal – first place	2025 Châteauroux	50 m Rifle 3 Positions Team
Gold medal – first place	2025 Châteauroux	50 m Rifle Prone Team
Gold medal – first place	2026 Yerevan	10 m air rifle team
Bronze medal – third place	2026 Yerevan	10 m air rifle
Bronze medal – third place	2026 Osijek	50 m rifle prone

Ole Martin Halvorsen (born 11 February 2000) is a Norwegian sport shooter. His achievements include winning team gold and bronze medals at the ISSF World Shooting Championships, and one individual victory in an ISSF World Cup event.

== Biography ==
Halvorsen was born on 11 February 2000. Hailing from Blomøy, he represents the club Kisen Miniatyrskytterlag.

=== 2023 ===
In June 2023 Halvorsen competed at the 2023 European Games, along with Simon Claussen and Jon-Hermann Hegg. The Norwegian team qualified for the finals in 50 metre rifle, where they placed fourth, defeated by Serbia in the bronze medal match.

Competing at the 2023 ISSF World Shooting Championships in Baku, Halvorsen won the team gold medal in 50 m rifle prone, along with Jon-Hermann Hegg and Henrik Larsen. He also won a bronze medal in 50 m rifle 3 positions team, along with Hegg and Larsen.

=== 2024 ===
At the European Championships in May 2024 Halvorsen won a team gold medal in 50m rifle match with the Norwegian team, along with Larsen and Hegg. At the 2024 ISSF World Cup event in Munich in June, he placed first in 50 m rifle match, ahead of István Péni and Jon-Hermann Hegg.

He was selected to compete at the 2024 Summer Olympics in Paris, along with five other Norwegian shooters. His first competition in the Olympics was in mixed air rifle team with teammate Synnøve Berg.

=== 2025 ===
In March 2025 Halvorsen won a team gold medal in 10m air rifle at the European Shooting Championships, along with Henrik Larsen and Jon-Hermann Hegg.
