= Maksim Bortnik =

Ukrainian director

- Born: Maksim E. Bortnik; July 3, 1987 (age 39); Kharkiv, Ukrainian SSR, Soviet Union
- Occupations: Film director, television director

Maksim Bоrtnik (born July 3, 1987), was born in Kharkiv in the Ukrainian SSR of the Soviet Union (in present-day Ukraine).

In 2009 he graduated from the Kharkiv State Academy of Culture. From 2007 to 2008 - animation designer at Kharkov TV OTV. Since 2008, he has been the television director of STB (Channel) in Kyiv. In 2009, he became principal director of historic program "У пошуках істини" ("In search of truth") STB (Channel). In 2010 - he was the head of humorous TV show "Смешные люди" ( "Funny People") STB (Channel).Since 2011, he has been the chief director of the Ukrainian TV show The Cube (analogue of the British show The Cube) STB (Channel).
