= Teodora Vukojević =

Serbian sport shooter

Personal information
- Nationality: Serbian
- Born: 3 April 2003 (age 23) Kragujevac

Sport
- Country: Serbia
- Sport: Sports shooting
- Events: 10 metre air rifle; 50 metre rifle three positions
Medal record
Women's shooting
Representing Serbia
European Championships
Gold medal – first place	2022 Hamar	10m air rifle
Silver medal – second place	2023 Tallinn	10m air rifle team
Mediterranean Games
Silver medal – second place	2022 Oran	10m air rifle

Teodora Vukojević (Serbian Cyrillic: Теодора Вукојевић; born 3 April 2003) is a Serbian sport shooter. She is a member of the Čika Mata Shooting Club from Kragujevac. At the age of eighteen, she won the gold medal in the 10m Air Rifle event at the 2022 European Senior Championships. At the 2022 Mediterranean Games in Oran, she won the silver medal, also in the 10m Air Rifle event. She finished 2022 as Serbia's top senior female rifle shooter. At the 2023 European Championships, as a member of the Serbian 10m Air Rifle team alongside Andrea Arsović and Ivana Andjušić Maksimović, she won the silver medal, while finishing fifth in the individual final. At the 2023 European Games, her best performance came in the 50m Rifle 3 Positions event, where she finished sixth in the final. In the qualification round, she broke the European junior record and equalled the world junior record.
