= Milenko Sebić =

Serbian sports shooter (born 1984)

Personal information
- Born: 30 December 1984 (age 41) Trstenik, SR Serbia, SFR Yugoslavia
- Height: 1.97 m (6 ft 6 in)
- Weight: 93 kg (205 lb)

Sport
- Country: Serbia
- Sport: Sports shooting
- Events: 10 metre air rifle; 50 metre rifle three positions
- Club: Crvena Zvezda
Medal record
Men's shooting
Representing Serbia
Olympic Games
Bronze medal – third place	2020 Tokyo	50m rifle 3 positions
World Championships
Bronze medal – third place	2014 Granada	50m rifle prone team
Bronze medal – third place	2022 Cairo	10 metre air rifle team
Bronze medal – third place	2026 Doha	50 m rifle prone team
European Games
Bronze medal – third place	2023 Kraków-Małopolska	50 m rifle 3 positions team
ISSF World Cup Final
Silver medal – second place	2019 Putian	50m rifle 3 positions
ISSF World Cup
Silver medal – second place	2016 Munich	50m rifle 3 positions
Bronze medal – third place	2021 Osijek	10m air rifle team
European Championships
Gold medal – first place	2009 Osijek	50m rifle prone team
Silver medal – second place	2021 Osijek	10m air rifle team
Silver medal – second place	2019 Osijek	10m air rifle team
Silver medal – second place	2017 Maribor	10m air rifle team
Bronze medal – third place	2007 Granada	50m rifle 3 positions team
Bronze medal – third place	2025 Châteauroux	50 m Rifle 3 Positions Team
Mediterranean Games
Gold medal – first place	2022 Oran	10 m air rifle
Universiade
Silver medal – second place	2007 Bangkok	50m rifle 3 positions

Milenko Sebić (Serbian Cyrillic: Миленко Себић; born 30 December 1984) is a Serbian sports shooter. He won a bronze medal in men's 50 metre rifle 3 positions at the 2020 Summer Olympics. He also competed in the men's 10 metre air rifle and men's 50 metre rifle 3 positions events at the 2016 Summer Olympics.

He has won three team bronze medals at the World Championships.

Sebić was part of the Serbian national team that won a gold medal in 50 metre rifle prone at the 2009 European Shooting Championships and a bronze medal in 50 metre rifle 3 positions event in 2007.

He won the gold medal in the air rifle event at the 2022 Mediterranean Games.

He won a silver medal at the 2007 Summer Universiade in Bangkok in 50m rifle 3 positions event.

== Personal life ==
In October 2014, Sebić married Russian sports shooter Alina Sebić (née Andreeva).
