= Alexis Raynaud =

French sport shooter (born 1994)

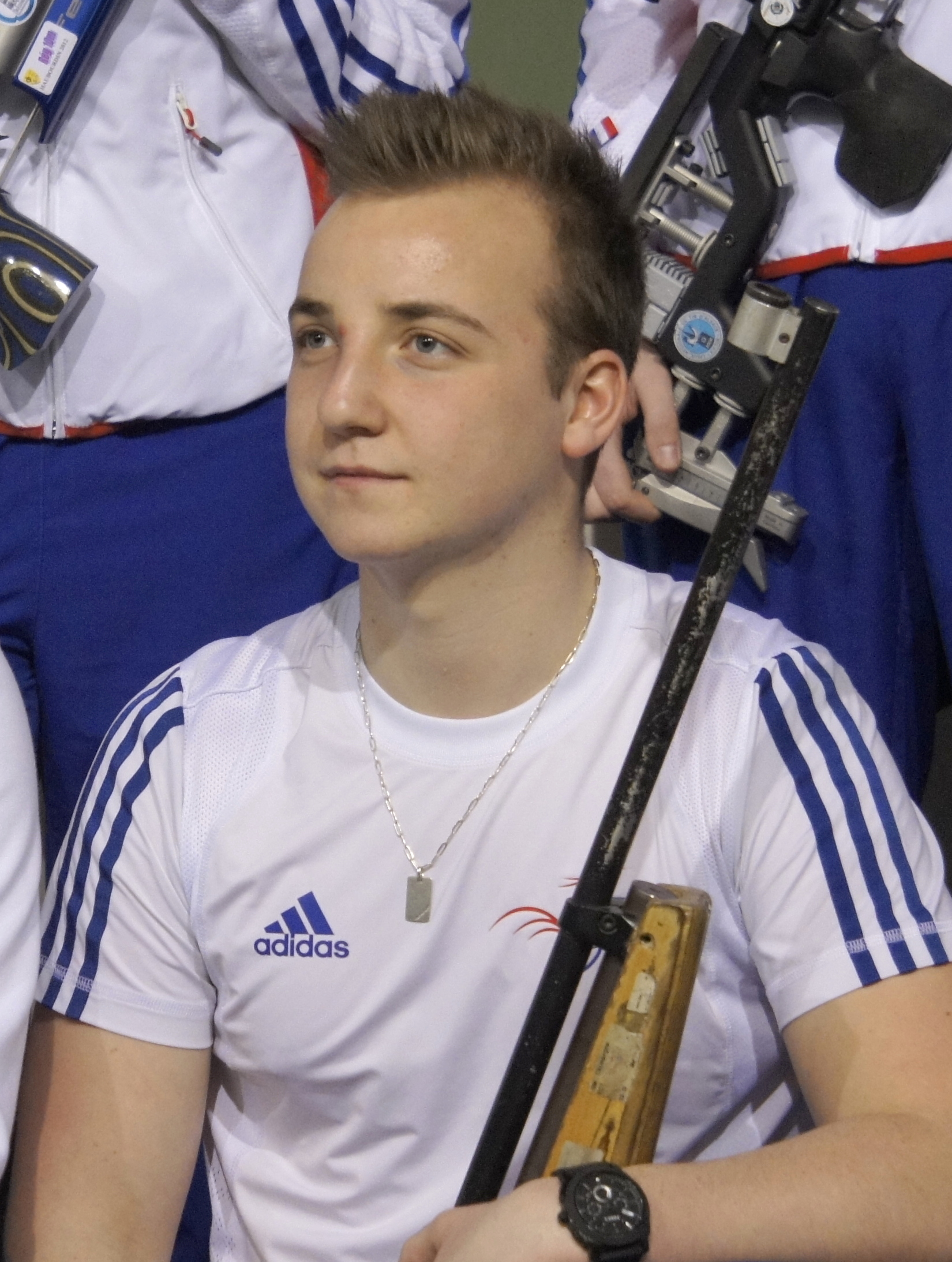
- Raynaud in 2013

Personal information
- Nationality: French
- Born: 19 August 1994 (age 32) Grasse, France
- Height: 172 cm (5 ft 8 in)
- Weight: 78 kg (172 lb)

Sport
- Country: France
- Sport: Shooting
- Event: 50 metre rifle three positions
- Club: Tir Sportif d'Antibes
- Coached by: Eric Viller (national)
Medal record
Men's shooting
Representing France
Olympic Games
Bronze medal – third place	2016 Rio de Janeiro	50 m rifle 3 positions
World Championships
Bronze medal – third place	2018 Changwon	300 m team rifle 3 positions
European Championships
Silver medal – second place	2015 Maribor	50 m rifle 3 positions

Alexis Raynaud (born 19 August 1994) is a French sport shooter. Competing in the 50 meter rifle three positions he won a silver medal at the 2015 European Championships and a bronze medal at the 2016 Olympics.
