= Danilo Sollazzo =

Italian sports shooter (born 2002)

Personal information
- Nationality: Italian
- Born: 5 December 2002 (age 23)

Sport
- Sport: Sports shooting
Medal record
Representing Italy
World Championships
Silver medal – second place	2022 Cairo	10 m air rifle
World Cup
Gold medal – first place	2025 Ningbo	10 m air rifle
Bronze medal – third place	2025 Ningbo	Mixed team
European Games
Gold medal – first place	2023 Kraków-Małopolska	10 m air rifle
Bronze medal – third place	2023 Kraków-Małopolska	10 m air rifle mixed team
European Championships
Gold medal – first place	2026 Yerevan	10 m air rifle
Mediterranean Games
Gold medal – first place	2026 Taranto	10 m air rifle
Silver medal – second place	2026 Taranto	10 m air rifle mixed team

Danilo Dennis Sollazzo (born 5 December 2002) is an Italian sports shooter. He won silver medal in 10 m air rifle event at the 2022 ISSF World Shooting Championships.
