= František Smetana =

Czech sport shooter (born 1997)

Personal information
- Nationality: Czech
- Born: 28 November 1997 (age 28) Uherské Hradiště, Czech Republic

Sport
- Sport: Sport shooting
Medal record
Representing Czech Republic
World Championships
Silver medal – second place	2023 Baku	10 m air rifle team
Bronze medal – third place	2023 Baku	10 m air rifle
European Games
Silver medal – second place	2023 Kraków-Małopolska	50 m rifle 3 positions team
European Championships
Gold medal – first place	2022 Hamar	10 m air rifle team
Gold medal – first place	2022 Wrocław	50 m rifle 3 positions team

František Smetana (born 28 November 1997) is a Czech sport shooter.

He won a bronze medal in 10 m air rifle event at the 2023 ISSF World Shooting Championships and went on to represent his country at the 2024 Summer Olympics.
