= Alexander Schmirl =

Austrian sports shooter (born 1989)

- Schmirl in 2026

Personal information
- Born: 19 September 1989 (age 37)

Sport
- Sport: Sports shooting
Medal record
Representing Austria
World Championships
Gold medal – first place	2023 Baku	50 m rifle 3 positions
Gold medal – first place	2025 Cairo	50 m rifle prone
Silver medal – second place	2023 Baku	50 m rifle 3 positions team
Silver medal – second place	2023 Baku	300 m rifle 3 positions team
Silver medal – second place	2025 Cairo	300 m rifle 3 positions team
Bronze medal – third place	2022 Cairo	300 m rifle prone
Bronze medal – third place	2022 Cairo	300 m rifle 3 positions team
European Games
Bronze medal – third place	2023 Kraków-Małopolska	50 m rifle 3 positions
Bronze medal – third place	2023 Kraków-Małopolska	10 m air rifle team
European Championships
Gold medal – first place	2022 Zagreb	300 m rifle 3 positions team
Silver medal – second place	2015 Maribor	50 m rifle prone team
Silver medal – second place	2017 Baku	300 m rifle standard team
Silver medal – second place	2023 Tallinn	10 m air rifle team
Silver medal – second place	2025 Châteauroux	50 m Rifle Prone
Silver medal – second place	2025 Châteauroux	300 m Rifle Prone
Silver medal – second place	2025 Châteauroux	300 m Rifle Prone Team
Bronze medal – third place	2017 Baku	50 m rifle 3 positions
Bronze medal – third place	2023 Tallinn	10 m air rifle
Bronze medal – third place	2025 Châteauroux	300 m Rifle 3 Positions

Alexander Schmirl (born 19 September 1989) is an Austrian sports shooter. He competed in the men's 10 metre air rifle event at the 2016 Summer Olympics.
