= Miran Maričić =

Croatian sport shooter (born 1997)

Personal information
- Nationality: Croatian
- Born: 17 June 1997 (age 29) Bjelovar, Croatia
- Height: 176 cm (5 ft 9 in)
- Weight: 68 kg (150 lb)

Sport
- Country: Croatia
- Sport: Shooting
- Event: Air rifle
- Club: SD Bjelovar 1874
Medal record
Men's Shooting
Representing Croatia
Olympic Games
Bronze medal – third place	2024 Paris	10m air rifle
World Championships
Silver medal – second place	2026 Doha	10 m air rifle team
Bronze medal – third place	2018 Changwon	10 m air rifle
Bronze medal – third place	2023 Baku	10 m air rifle team
Bronze medal – third place	2026 Doha	10 m air rifle
European Games
Silver medal – second place	2023 Kraków-Małopolska	10 m air rifle team
European Championships
Silver medal – second place	2018 Győr	10 m air rifle team
Silver medal – second place	2020 Wrocław	10 m air rifle team
Silver medal – second place	2024 Győr	10 m air rifle team
Silver medal – second place	2025 Osijek	10 m air rifle team
Bronze medal – third place	2020 Wrocław	10 m air rifle mix team
Bronze medal – third place	2025 Osijek	10 m air rifle
Bronze medal – third place	2026 Yerevan	10 m air rifle team
Mediterranean Games
Silver medal – second place	2022 Oran	10 m air rifle
Silver medal – second place	2026 Taranto	10 m air rifle
Junior World Shooting Championships
Gold medal – first place	2017 Suhl	10 m air rifle
Bronze medal – third place	2017 Suhl	10 m air rifle team

Miran Maričić (born 17 June 1997) is a Croatian sport shooter specialised in air rifle. He won bronze medal at the 2024 Summer Olympics, four medals at the World Championships and seven medals at the European Championships, as well as silver medals at the Mediterranean (2022, 2026) and European Games (2023). He was junior world champion in air rifle in 2017.

== Sports career ==
Maričić began his career with shooting team SD Bjelovar 1874 under his personal coach Damir Bošnjak. He studied information technology at Faculty of Organization and Informatics (FOI) in Varaždin.

He won the Junior World Champion title at ISSF Junior World Championship in Suhl, Germany 2017. At the 2018 ISSF World Shooting Championship held between 31 August and 15 September 2018 in Changwon, South Korea, won bronze medal in 10m Air Rifle Men and also a Tokyo 2020 Olympic Quota place for Croatia.

At the 2024 Summer Olympics, he earned a bronze medal in the men's 10 metre air rifle event.

By winning bronze medal in 10 metre air rifle at the 2026 World Championship in Doha, Qatar, he was first Croatian athlete to secure appearence at the 2028 Summer Olympics in Los Angeles.

== Awards ==
Maričić also won Dražen Petrović Award in 2017 for talented young athletes and teams for outstanding sporting results and sports development.
