= Zalán Pekler =

Hungarian sports shooter (born 2000)

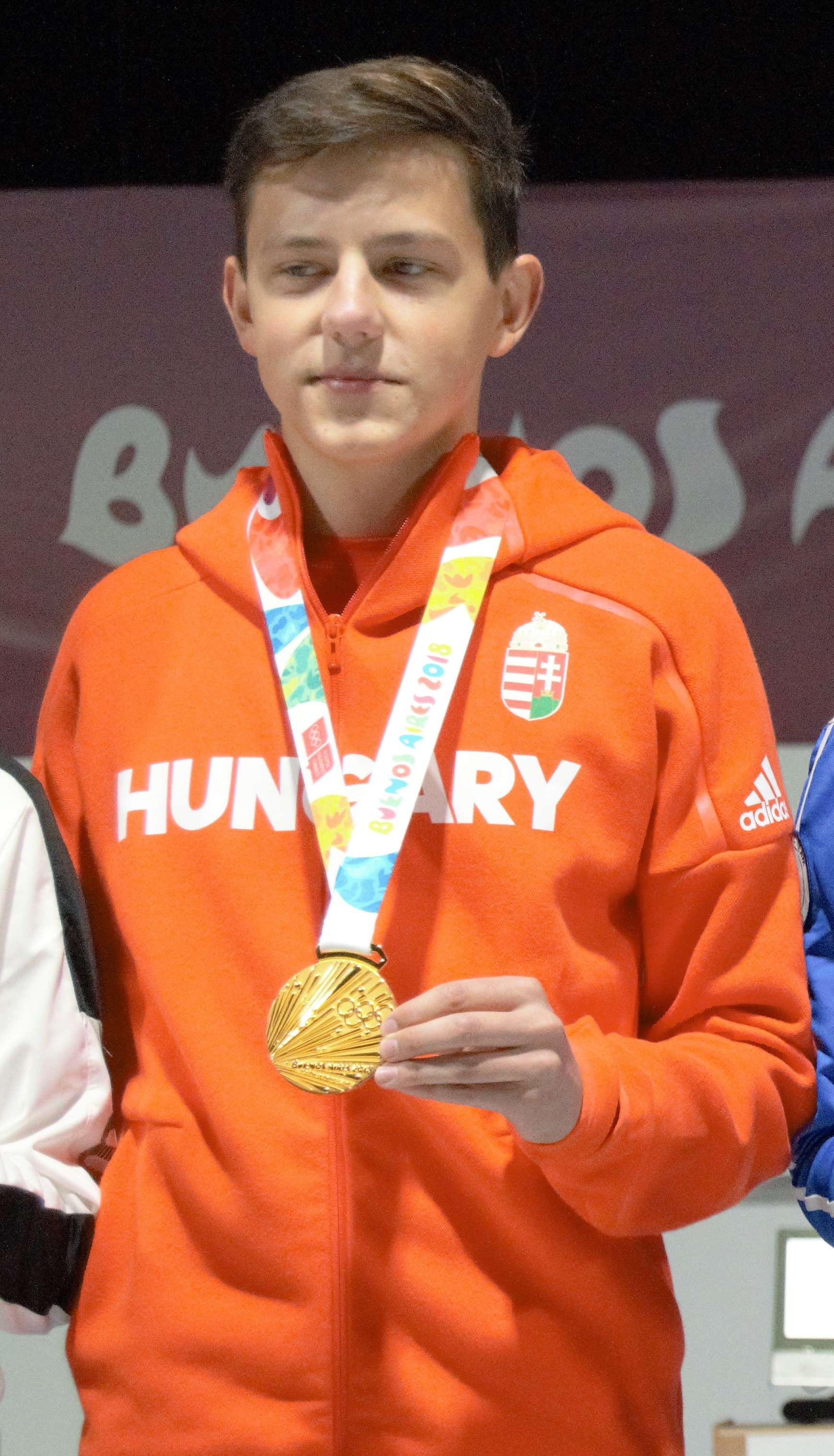
- Pekler at the 2018 Summer Youth Olympics

Personal information
- Nationality: Hungarian
- Born: 8 February 2000 (age 26) Komárom, Hungary

Sport
- Sport: Sports shooting
Medal record
Representing Hungary
World Championships
Bronze medal – third place	2025 Cairo	10m air rifle team
European Games
Gold medal – first place	2023 Kraków-Małopolska	50 m rifle 3 positions
Gold medal – first place	2023 Kraków-Małopolska	10 m air rifle team
Gold medal – first place	2023 Kraków-Małopolska	50 m rifle 3 positions team
Gold medal – first place	2023 Kraków-Małopolska	10 m air rifle mixed team
European Championships
Bronze medal – third place	2024 Győr	10 m air rifle team
Representing (International Olympic Committee) Mixed-NOCs
Youth Olympic Games
Gold medal – first place	2018 Buenos Aires	Mixed 10 metre air rifle

Zalán Pekler (born 8 February 2000) is a Hungarian sports shooter. He competed in the men's 10 metre air rifle event at the 2020 Summer Olympics.
