= Jiří Přívratský =

Czech sport shooter (born 2001)

Personal information
- Nationality: Czech
- Born: 13 March 2001 (age 25) Ostrava, Czech Republic

Sport
- Sport: Sport shooting
Medal record
World Championships
Gold medal – first place	2025 Cairo	300 m rifle prone team
Gold medal – first place	2026 Doha	50 m rifle 3 positions team
Silver medal – second place	2023 Baku	10 m air rifle team
Silver medal – second place	2025 Cairo	300 m standard rifle
Silver medal – second place	2026 Doha	50 m rifle prone team
European Games
Silver medal – second place	2023 Kraków-Małopolska	50 m rifle 3 positions
Silver medal – second place	2023 Kraków-Małopolska	50 m rifle 3 positions team
Bronze medal – third place	2023 Kraków-Małopolska	10 m air rifle
European Championships
Gold medal – first place	2022 Hamar	Rifle team
Gold medal – first place	2022 Wrocław	50 m rifle 3 positions team
Gold medal – first place	2025 Osijek	10 m air rifle team
Silver medal – second place	2025 Châteauroux	50 m Rifle 3 Positions Team
Bronze medal – third place	2022 Wrocław	50 m rifle 3 positions
Bronze medal – third place	2025 Châteauroux	300 m Rifle 3 Positions Team
World University Games
Bronze medal – third place	2021 Chengdu	50 m rifle 3 positions

Jiří Přívratský (born 13 March 2001) is a Czech sport shooter. He competed in the men's 10 metre air rifle event at the 2020 Summer Olympics.
