= Martin Strempfl =

Austrian sport shooter (born 1984)

Personal information
- Nationality: Austrian
- Born: 1 August 1984 (age 41) Graz, Austria

Sport
- Sport: Shooting
Medal record
Representing Austria
European Games
Bronze medal – third place	2023 Kraków-Małopolska	10 m air rifle team
European Championships
Bronze medal – third place	2024 Győr	10 m air rifle
Bronze medal – third place	2025 Osijek	10 m air rifle team

Martin Strempfl (born 1 August 1984) is an Austrian sport shooter. He qualified to represent Austria at the 2020 Summer Olympics in Tokyo 2021, competing in men's 10 metre air rifle and finishing 13th.
