= Aleksi Leppä =

Finnish sport shooter (born 1994)

Personal information
- Nationality: Finnish
- Born: 2 September 1994 (age 31) Hamina, Finland
- Height: 1.69 m (5 ft 7 in)
- Weight: 65 kg (143 lb)

Sport
- Country: Finland
- Sport: Shooting
- Events: 10m Air Rifle Men; 50m Rifle 3 Positions Men; 50m Rifle Prone Men; 300m Rifle 3 Positions Men; 300m Rifle Prone Men; 300m Standard Rifle Men
- Club: Haminan Ampumaseura
- Coached by: Marko Leppä; Juha Hirvi
Medal record
World Championships
Gold medal – first place	2018 Changwon	300 m standard rifle
Gold medal – first place	2018 Changwon	300 m rifle 3 positions
Silver medal – second place	2022 Cairo	300 m rifle 3 positions
Silver medal – second place	2022 Cairo	300 m rifle 3 positions mixed team
Silver medal – second place	2023 Baku	300 m rifle prone
European Championships
Bronze medal – third place	2021 Osijek	300 m rifle 3 positions mixed team
Bronze medal – third place	2025 Châteauroux	300 m Rifle Prone
World Military Games
Silver medal – second place	2019 Wuhan	300 m military rapid fire rifle team

Aleksi Leppä (born 2 September 1994) is a Finnish sport shooter.

He participated at the 2018 ISSF World Shooting Championships, winning two gold medals.

Leppä's coach was his father, Marko Leppä, who died on the flight to 2024 Summer Olympics where Leppä participated in his first Olympic competition.
