= Petar Gorša =

Croatian sports shooter (born 1988)

Personal information
- Nationality: Croatian
- Born: 11 January 1988 (age 38) Bjelovar, SR Croatia, SFR Yugoslavia
- Height: 1.82 m (6 ft 0 in)
- Weight: 82 kg (181 lb)

Sport
- Country: Croatia
- Sport: Shooting
- Event: Air rifle

Achievements and titles
- Olympic finals: 2008–2024
Medal record
Men's Shooting
Representing Croatia
World Championships
Silver medal – second place	2018 Changwon	10 m air rifle
Silver medal – second place	2018 Changwon	50 m rifle 3 positions
Silver medal – second place	2026 Doha	10 m air rifle team
Bronze medal – third place	2023 Baku	10 m air rifle team
European Games
Silver medal – second place	2015 Baku	50 m rifle 3 positions
Silver medal – second place	2023 Kraków-Małopolska	10 m air rifle team
European Championships
Silver medal – second place	2015 Arnhem	Mixed team 10 m air rifle
Silver medal – second place	2024 Győr	10 m air rifle team
Silver medal – second place	2025 Osijek	10 m air rifle team
Bronze medal – third place	2018 Győr	10 m air rifle
Bronze medal – third place	2026 Yerevan	10 m air rifle team

Petar Gorša (born 11 January 1988) is a Croatian sports shooter. He competed at the 2008, 2012, 2016, and 2024 Summer Olympics.

== Early and personal life ==
A native of Bjelovar, Gorša started his career at Shooting Club Bjelovar 1874 in 1996, inspired by his grandfather.

Before coming to Veliko Trgovišće, he lived on the island of Vir for six years and trained in Zadar. Gorša has been a member of the Bjelovar Shooting Society since 1997.

== Career ==
At the 2008 Olympics, Gorša competed in the 10 m air rifle, the 50 m rifle prone and the 50m rifle three positions, finishing in 37th, 49th and 44th position respectively. At the 2012 Olympics, he only competed in the 10 m air rifle, finishing in 43rd.

At the 2016 Summer Olympics, Gorša competed in the 50 m rifle prone, the 50 m rifle three positions and the 10 m air rifle. He reached the final of the 10 m air rifle finishing seventh place.
