= Milutin Stefanović =

Serbian sports shooter (born 1985)

Personal information
- Born: 23 January 1985 (age 41) Kragujevac, SR Serbia, Yugoslavia
- Height: 180 cm (5 ft 11 in)
- Weight: 74 kg (163 lb)

Sport
- Sport: Sports shooting
Medal record
Men's shooting
Representing Serbia
World Championships
Bronze medal – third place	2022 Cairo	10 metre air rifle team
ISSF World Cup Final
Silver medal – second place	2017 New Delhi	10m air rifle mixed team
Bronze medal – third place	2015 Munich	10m air rifle
ISSF World Cup
Gold medal – first place	2017 Gabala	10m air rifle
Gold medal – first place	2015 Fort Benning	10m air rifle
Silver medal – second place	2014 Fort Benning	10m air rifle
Bronze medal – third place	2021 Osijek	10m air rifle team
Bronze medal – third place	2014 Maribor	10m air rifle
European Games
Bronze medal – third place	2023 Kraków-Małopolska	50 m rifle 3 positions team
European Championships
Gold medal – first place	2017 Maribor	10m air rifle mixed team
Gold medal – first place	2016 Győr	10m air rifle mixed team
Gold medal – first place	2015 Arnhem	10m air rifle mixed team
Silver medal – second place	2021 Osijek	10m air rifle team
Silver medal – second place	2019 Osijek	10m air rifle team
Silver medal – second place	2018 Győr	10m air rifle mixed team
Silver medal – second place	2017 Maribor	10m air rifle team
Mediterranean Games
Gold medal – first place	2018 Tarragona	10m air rifle
Universiade
Bronze medal – third place	2013 Kazan	50m rifle TP team

Milutin Stefanović (Serbian Cyrillic: Милутин Стефановић; born 23 January 1985) is a Serbian sports shooter. He competed in the men's 10 metre air rifle event at the 2016 Summer Olympics., finishing in 12th place. At the Tokyo 2020 Olympic Games, he competed in three events, finishing 38th in the 10m air rifle, 23rd in the 50m rifle three positions, and 16th in the 10m air rifle mixed team event alongside Andrea Arsović.

He won a team bronze medal at the 2022 World Championships in the 10m air rifle event. He has also won three European Championship titles in the 10m air rifle mixed team event, partnering Andrea Arsović. He claimed his first Mediterranean Games title in the 10 meters air rifle event at the 2018 Games in Tarragona.
