= Lazar Kovačević =

Serbian sports shooter (born 1997)

Personal information
- Born: 4 November 1997 (age 29) Jagodina, Serbia, FR Yugoslavia
- Height: 1.80 m (5 ft 11 in)
- Weight: 70 kg (154 lb)

Sport
- Country: Serbia
- Sport: Sports shooting
- Events: 10 metre air rifle; 50 metre rifle three positions
- Club: Jagodina 92
- Coached by: Miomir Spasojević
Medal record
Men's shooting
Representing Serbia
World Championships
Bronze medal – third place	2022 Cairo	10 metre air rifle team
Bronze medal – third place	2026 Doha	50 m rifle prone team
European Games
Bronze medal – third place	2023 Kraków-Małopolska	50 m rifle 3 positions team
European Championships
Gold medal – first place	2023 Tallinn	10m air rifle team
Silver medal – second place	2019 Osijek	10m air rifle team
Silver medal – second place	2021 Osijek	10m air rifle team
Silver medal – second place	2022 Hamar	10m air rifle mix
Bronze medal – third place	2025 Châteauroux	50 m Rifle 3 Positions Team
Mediterranean Games
Silver medal – second place	2022 Oran	10 m air rifle mixed team
ISSF World Cup
Bronze medal – third place	2021 Osijek	10m air rifle team
European Junior Championships
Gold medal – first place	2015 Maribor	50m rifle TP team
Silver medal – second place	2017 Maribor	10m air rifle
Silver medal – second place	2017 Maribor	10m air rifle mixed team

Lazar Kovačević (Serbian Cyrillic: Лазар Ковачевић; born 4 November 1997) is a Serbian sports shooter.

He competed at the 2024 Paris Olympic Games, finishing eighth in the 50m rifle three positions event after reaching the final, and 37th in the 10m air rifle event.

He won European Junior Championships silver medal in 2017 in Maribor and finished in fourth place in 10m air rifle at the 2018 Mediterranean Games in Tarragona.

Kovačević won two silver medals as part of the Serbian team at 2019 European 10 m Events Championships and 2021 European Shooting Championships, respectively, as well as a bronze medal at the 2021 World Cup in Osijek.

Partnering Andrea Arsović, he won silver medals in the 10m air rifle mixed team event at the 2022 European Championships and Mediterranean Games.
