= Oleh Tsarkov =

Ukrainian sports shooter (born 1988)

Personal information
- Full name: Oleh Serhiyovych Tsarkov
- Born: 22 March 1988 (age 38)

Sport
- Sport: Sports shooting
Medal record
Men's shooting
Representing Ukraine
European Championships
Gold medal – first place	2024 Győr	10 m air rifle team
Bronze medal – third place	2018 Győr	Air rifle mixed team

Oleh Serhiyovych Tsarkov (Ukrainian: Олег Сергійович Царьков; born 22 March 1988) is a Ukrainian sports shooter. He competed in the men's 10 metre air rifle event at the 2016 Summer Olympics.
