= Maximilian Dallinger =

German sport shooter

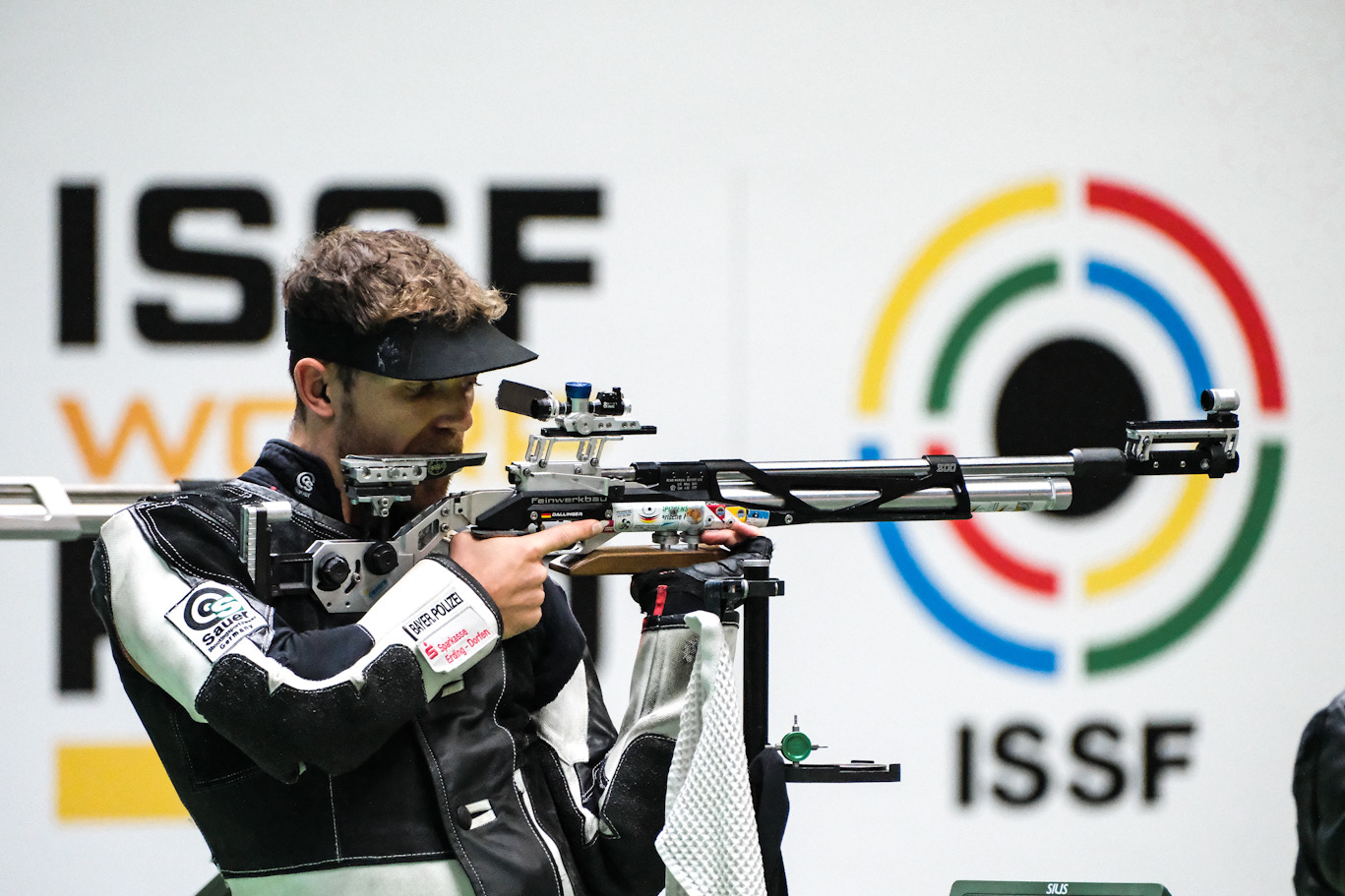
- World Cup Rio 10m air rifle

Personal information
- Nationality: German
- Born: 25 September 1996 (age 29) Erding, Bavaria, Germany
- Height: 1.82 m (6 ft 0 in)
- Weight: 78 kg (172 lb)

Sport
- Country: Germany
- Sport: Shooting
- Event: Rifle
- Club: SG Isental Lengdorf
Medal record
Men's shooting
Representing Germany
World Championships
Gold medal – first place	2018 Changwon	50 m rifle prone team
Gold medal – first place	2025 Cairo	10m air rifle
Silver medal – second place	2014 Granada	50 m 3position team Juniors
Silver medal – second place	2023 Baku	50 m rifle prone team
Silver medal – second place	2025 Cairo	10m air rifle team
Bronze medal – third place	2022 Cairo	50 m rifle prone mixed team
World Cup
Silver medal – second place	2023 Cairo	50m 3 position mixed team
Bronze medal – third place	2023 Cairo	10 m air rifle mixed team
Silver medal – second place	2023 Rio de Janeiro	10 m air rifle
Gold medal – first place	2024 Granada	10 m air rifle mixed team
European Championships
Gold medal – first place	2014 Moskow	10 m air rifle juniors
Gold medal – first place	2016 Györ	10 m air rifle juniors
Bronze medal – third place	2017 Maribor	10 m air rifle team
Bronze medal – third place	2017 Maribor	10 m air rifle mixed team
Bronze medal – third place	2017 Baku	50 m rifle 3 positions team
Bronze medal – third place	2023 Tallinn	10 m air rifle team

Maximilian Dallinger (born 25 September 1996) is a German sport shooter.

Part of the national team since 2014. Professional sport shooter since 2015. Completion of the apprenticeship to become police officer in 2020. He participated at the 2018 ISSF World Shooting Championships, winning a gold medal.
