= Maximilian Ulbrich =

German sport shooter (born 1999)

Personal information
- Nationality: German
- Born: 27 November 2000 (age 25)

Sport
- Country: Germany
- Sport: Shooting
- Event: Air rifle
- Club: SG Wilzhofen
Medal record
Men's shooting
Representing Germany
World Championships
Silver medal – second place	2025 Cairo	10m air rifle team
European Games
Silver medal – second place	2023 Wrocław	50 m rifle 3 positions team
European Championships
Gold medal – first place	2018 Győr	10 m air rifle
Gold medal – first place	2023 Tallinn	10 m air rifle mixed
Gold medal – first place	2024 Győr	10 m air rifle mixed
Silver medal – second place	2019 Osijek	10 m air rifle team
Silver medal – second place	2026 Yerevan	10 m air rifle team mixed
Bronze medal – third place	2023 Tallinn	10 m air rifle team
World Cup
Gold medal – first place	2023 Rio de Janeiro	10 m air rifle mixed
Silver medal – second place	2024 Cairo	10 m air rifle
Bronze medal – third place	2024 Cairo	10 m air rifle mixed
Junior World Cup
Silver medal – second place	2019 Suhl	10 m air rifle
Silver medal – second place	2019 Suhl	10 m air rifle Mixed

Maximilian Ulbrich (born 27 November 2000) is a German sport shooter. He is a three-time European champion with the air rifle.

== Professional career ==
Maximilian Ulbrich had several successes in his youth, such as 1st place at the German Youth Championships 10 m air rifle 2018 and 6th place at the 2018 Summer Youth Olympic Games in Buenos Aires. In 2019, he won a silver medal in both the 10 m air rifle and 10 m air rifle mixed disciplines at the ISSF Junior World Cup 2019 in Suhl.

After that, things quietened down somewhat for Ulbrich, who continued to train as a police officer with the Bavarian police's top sports support group. Ulbrich returned to success with his new coach Wolfram Waibel and became European air rifle champion in 2023, despite breaking his left wrist just a few days before the competition. This was followed in 2024 by a first place at the European Air Rifle Championships in Győr with his teammate Anna Janssen and a silver medal at the European Games in Wrocław.

At the Olympic Games, Ulbrich - also with Anna Janßen - qualified for the mixed bronze medal match. There they lost to the Kazakh duo Alexandra Le and Islam Sätbajew after 60 shots with 1.1 points 630.8 to 629.7 rings and thus took fourth place.
