= István Péni =

Hungarian sport shooter (born 1997)

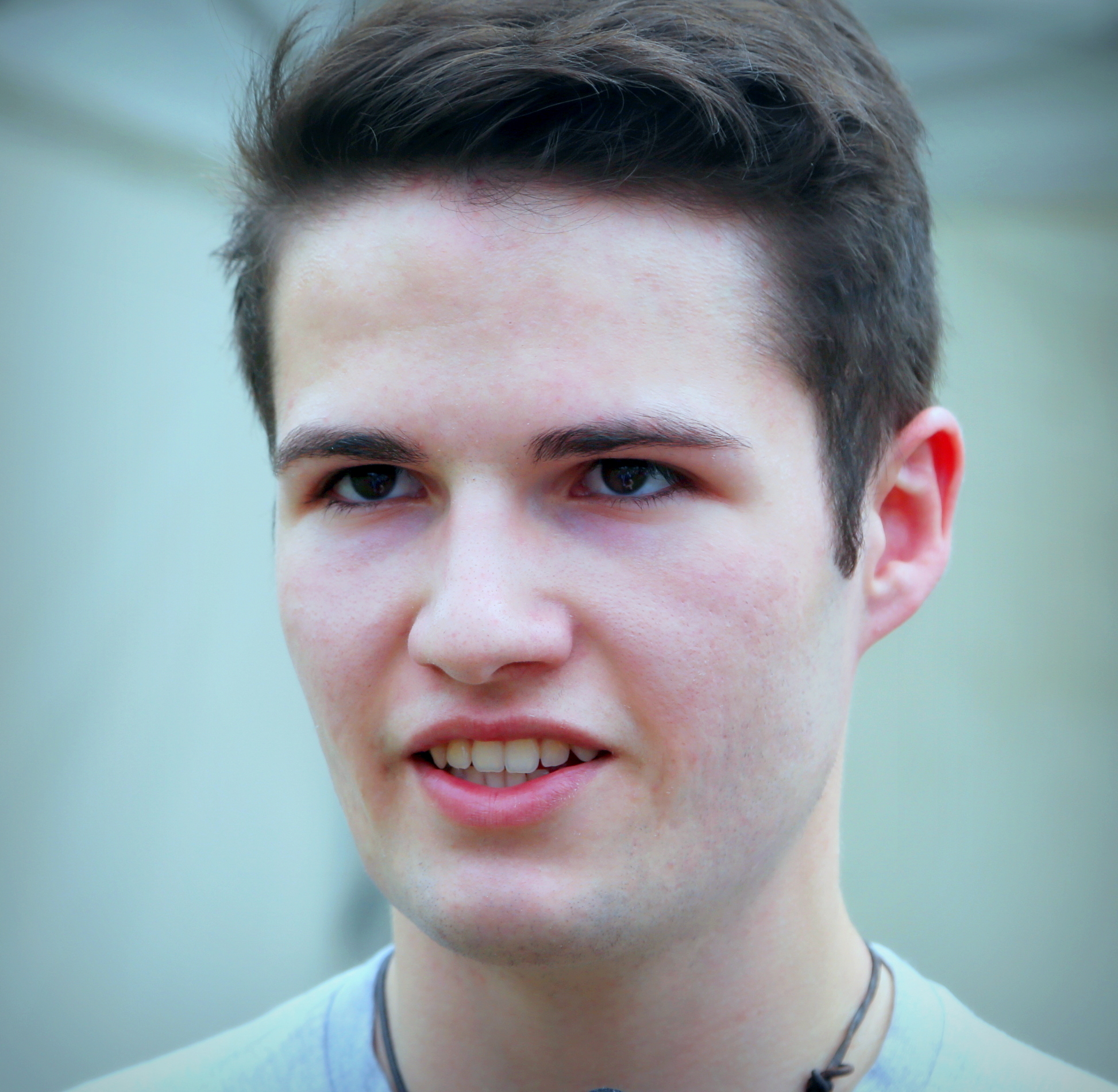
- Péni in 2016

Personal information
- Full name: István Péni
- Nationality: Hungarian
- Born: 14 February 1997 (age 29) Budapest, Hungary
- Height: 1.76 m (5 ft 9 in)
- Weight: 62 kg (137 lb)

Sport
- Country: Hungary
- Sport: Shooting
- Events: 10 m air rifle (AR60); 50 m rifle prone (FR60PR); 50 m rifle 3 positions (FR3X40)
- Club: Újpesti TE
- Coached by: József Tóth; Edit Kissné Oroszi
Medal record
Men's shooting
Representing Hungary
Event	1st	2nd	3rd
World Championships	1	1	2
World Cup	1	1	2
Youth Olympics	0	0	1
Junior European Championships (SC)	0	1	1
World Championships
Gold medal – first place	2023 Baku	300 m standard rifle open
Silver medal – second place	2018 Changwon	300 m rifle 3 positions
Silver medal – second place	2026 Doha	50 m rifle prone
Bronze medal – third place	2025 Cairo	10 m air rifle team
World Cup
Gold medal – first place	2025 Buenos Aires	50 m rifle 3 positions
Silver medal – second place	2025 Buenos Aires	10 m air rifle
Bronze medal – third place	2025 Lima	10 m air rifle
Bronze medal – third place	2025 Lima	50 m rifle 3 positions
European Games
Gold medal – first place	2023 Kraków-Małopolska	10 m air rifle team
Gold medal – first place	2023 Kraków-Małopolska	50 m rifle 3 positions team
Bronze medal – third place	2019 Minsk	50 m rifle 3 positions
European Championships
Gold medal – first place	2025 Châteauroux	50 m rifle 3 positions
Silver medal – second place	2024 Győr	10 m air rifle
Bronze medal – third place	2024 Győr	10 m air rifle team
Summer Youth Olympics
Bronze medal – third place	2014 Nanjing	10 m air rifle
Junior European Championships
Silver medal – second place	2015 Arnhem	10 m air rifle
Bronze medal – third place	2015 Maribor	50 m rifle prone
Representing (International Olympic Committee) Mixed-NOCs
Summer Youth Olympics
Gold medal – first place	2014 Nanjing	Mixed team

István Péni (born 14 February 1997) is a Hungarian sport shooter. He won a bronze medal in boys' 10 m air rifle shooting, and also shared a top prize with Egypt's Hadir Mekhimar in the mixed international rifle team at the 2014 Summer Youth Olympics in Nanjing, China. Péni is also a member of the shooting team at Újpesti Sports Club (Hungarian: Újpesti Torna Egylet) in Budapest under his personal coach József Tóth and Edit Kissné Oroszi.

Péni made his first Olympic team for Hungary as a 17-year-old at the 2014 Summer Youth Olympics in Nanjing, China, where he achieved a total of two medals in shooting: a gold and a bronze. In his first event, boys' 10 m air rifle, Péni shot a decent score of 183.5 to pick up the bronze medal in the final round, finishing more than twenty-five points behind eventual Youth Olympic champion Yang Haoran. Two days later, Péni and his international partner Hadir Mekhimad of Egypt triumphed the Latin American duo made up of Argentina's Fernanda Russo and Mexico's José Santos Valdés 10–2 for the gold in the mixed rifle team competition.
