= Patrik Jány =

Slovak sport shooter (born 1997)

Personal information
- Born: 29 July 1997 (age 29) Banská Štiavnica, Slovakia
- Height: 1.75 m (5 ft 9 in)
- Weight: 82 kg (181 lb)

Sport
- Country: Slovakia
- Sport: Shooting
- Events: 10 m air rifle AR60); 50 m rifle prone (FR60PR); 50 m rifle 3 positions (FR3X40)
- Club: Dukla Banská Bystrica
- Coached by: Zoltán Baláž
Medal record
Men's shooting
Representing Slovakia
World Championships
Gold medal – first place	2026 Doha	50 m rifle prone
European Championships
Gold medal – first place	2024 Győr	10 m air rifle
Bronze medal – third place	2025 Châteauroux	50 m Rifle Prone Team
Summer Universiade
Gold medal – first place	2019 Naples	10 m air rifle
Bronze medal – third place	2019 Naples	10 m air rifle team

Patrik Jány (born 29 July 1997) is a Slovak sport shooter who competes in the men's 10 metre air rifle. He competed for Slovakia at the 2019 Summer Universiade in Naples, Italy and 2019 European Games in Minsk, Belarus. He competed at the 2020 Summer Olympics in Tokyo, Japan.
