= Maciej Kowalewicz =

Polish sport shooter

Personal information
- Born: 4 November 1999 (age 26) Olsztyn, Poland
- Height: 177 cm (5 ft 10 in)

Sport
- Club: Gwardia Olsztyn
Medal record
Men's shooting
Representing Poland
World Championships
Bronze medal – third place	2025 Cairo	300 m rifle 3 positions team
Bronze medal – third place	2025 Cairo	300 m rifle prone team

Maciej Kowalewicz (born 4 November 1999 in Olsztyn) is a Polish sport shooter specializing in rifle shooting, and a bronze medalist at the Junior European Championships.

== Biography ==
Maciej was born in Olsztyn. He completed his education at the local Gymnasium No. 3 and XI High School. In 2018, he began studying tourism and recreation at the University of Warmia and Mazury in Olsztyn.

In 2019, he won a bronze medal at the European Championships in Bologna in the junior men's 50 m rifle three positions event. He was bested only by Germany's Max Braun and Russia's Grigoriy Shamakov.
