= Tomasz Bartnik =

Polish sport shooter (born 1990)

Personal information
- Nationality: Polish
- Born: 15 January 1990 (age 36) Warsaw, Poland
- Height: 1.73 m (5 ft 8 in)
- Weight: 66 kg (146 lb)

Sport
- Country: Poland
- Sport: Shooting
- Event: Air rifle
- Club: Legia Warsaw
Medal record
Men's shooting
Representing Poland
World Championships
Gold medal – first place	2018 Changwon	50 m rifle 3 positions
Gold medal – first place	2022 Cairo	300 m rifle 3 positions mixed team
Gold medal – first place	2025 Cairo	300 m rifle 3 positions
Silver medal – second place	2022 Cairo	50 m rifle 3 positions
Silver medal – second place	2022 Cairo	300 m rifle prone
Silver medal – second place	2023 Baku	300 m rifle prone team
Silver medal – second place	2023 Baku	300 m rifle 3 positions
Bronze medal – third place	2022 Cairo	300 m rifle prone team
Bronze medal – third place	2025 Cairo	300 m rifle 3 positions team
Bronze medal – third place	2025 Cairo	300 m rifle prone team
World Cup
Bronze medal – third place	2017 Gabala	50m 3 rifle 3 positions
Bronze medal – third place	2022 Baku	50m 3 rifle 3 positions Mixed Team
Bronze medal – third place	2023 Lima	10m air rifle Mixed Team
European Championships
Bronze medal – third place	2019 Blogona	50m rifle pron

Tomasz Bartnik (born 15 January 1990) is a Polish sport shooter.

He participated at the 2018 ISSF World Shooting Championships, winning a gold medal.
