= Ukraine at the 2023 European Games =

- IOC code: UKR
- NOC: National Olympic Committee of Ukraine
- Website: www.noc-ukr.org

in Kraków and Małopolska, Poland 21 June – 2 July 2023
- Competitors: 269 in 27 sports
- Flag bearers (opening): Anastasia Pavlova; Andrii Rybachok
- Flag bearer (closing): Tymur Brykov
- Medals Ranked 3rd: Gold 21 Silver 12 Bronze 8 Total 41

European Games appearances (overview)
- 2015; 2019; 2023; 2027

Ukraine competed at the 2023 European Games, in Kraków and Małopolska, Poland, from 21 June to 2 July 2023. Ukraine entered 269 athletes in 27 sports. Ukrainian athletes did not qualify to compete in beach handball, padel and rugby sevens.

== Medalists ==
Medal	Name	Sport	Event	Date
Gold	Liudmyla Luzan; Valeriia Tereta	Canoe sprint	Women's C-2 200 metres	22 June
Gold	Oleh Kukharyk; Ihor Trunov	Canoe sprint	Men's K-2 200 metres	22 June
Gold	Anzhelika Terliuga	Karate	Women's kumite 55 kg	22 June
Gold	Kseniia Bailo; Danylo Konovalov; Anna Pysmenska; Oleksii Sereda	Diving	Team event	22 June
Gold	Andrii Zaplitnyi	Karate	Men's kumite 75 kg	23 June
Gold	Liudmyla Luzan	Canoe sprint	Women's C-1 500 metres	24 June
Gold	Kirill Boliukh; Kseniya Baylo	Diving	Mixed synchronized 10 metre platform	24 June
Gold	Nataliya Krol	Athletics	Women's 800 m	24 June
Gold	Maryna Bekh-Romanchuk	Athletics	Women's triple jump	24 June
Gold	Kirill Boliukh; Oleksiy Sereda	Diving	Men's synchronized 10 metre platform	25 June
Gold	Yaroslava Mahuchikh	Athletics	Women's high jump	25 June
Gold	Dzhoan Feybi Bezhura	Fencing	Women's épée	26 June
Gold	Olha Kharlan	Fencing	Women's sabre	27 June
Gold	Pavlo Korostylov; Yuliya Korostylova	Shooting	Mixed team 25 metre rapid fire pistol	27 June
Gold	Ihor Liubchenko	Muaythai	Men's 67 kg	27 June
Gold	Oleksandr Yefimenko	Muaythai	Men's 71 kg	27 June
Gold	Oleh Pryimachov	Muaythai	Men's 91 kg	27 June
Gold	Olena Kostevych; Anastasiia Nimets; Yuliya Korostylova	Shooting	Women's team 25 metre rapid fire pistol	28 June
Gold	Oleh Kolodiy; Danylo Konovalov	Diving	Men's 3 metre synchro springboard	28 June
Gold	Oleksandr Khyzhniak	Boxing	Men's light heavyweight	1 July
Gold	Viktoriia Us	Canoe slalom	Women's kayak cross	2 July
Silver	Dmytro Danylenko; Oleh Kukharyk; Ivan Semykin; Ihor Trunov	Canoe sprint	Men's K-4 500 metres	23 June
Silver	Liudmyla Luzan	Canoe sprint	Women's C-1 200 metres	23 June
Silver	Anita Serogina	Karate	Women's kumite 61 kg	23 June
Silver	Vladyslava Aleksiyiva; Maryna Aleksiyiva; Veronika Hryshko; Marta Fiedina; Daria Moshynska; Anhelina Ovchynnikova; Valeriya Tyshchenko; Anastasiia Shmonina	Artistic swimming	Team acrobatic routine	24 June
Silver	Mykhaylo Kokhan	Athletics	Men's hammer throw	24 June
Silver	Vladyslava Aleksiyiva; Maryna Aleksiyiva	Artistic swimming	Duet free routine	24 June
Silver	Anastasia Pavlova; Ivan Kozhokar	Archery	Mixed team recurve	25 June
Silver	Yehor Skurikhin	Muaythai	Men's 81 kg	27 June
Silver	Kseniya Baylo; Sofia Esman	Diving	Women's synchronized 10 metre platform	27 June
Silver	Anna Ponomarenko	Breakdancing	B-Girls'	27 June
Silver	Ukraine women's national beach soccer team: Ania Davydenko; Iuliia Dekhtiar; Iryna Dubytska; Anastasiia Klipachenko; Iuliia Kostiuk; Viktoriia Kyslova; Anna Shulha; Anastasiia Terekh; Mariia Tykhonova; Iryna Vasyliuk; Snizhana Volovenko; Myroslava Vypasniak; Taisiia Babenko; Aliona Kyrylchuk	Beach soccer	Women's competition	1 July
Silver	Tymur Brykov	Kickboxing	Men's 75 kg Full Contact	2 July
Bronze	Olena Kostevych	Shooting	Women's 10 metre air pistol	22 June
Bronze	Mykyta Filipov	Karate	Men's kumite 60 kg	22 June
Bronze	Vladyslav Shepeliev	Athletics	Men's triple jump	23 June
Bronze	Artur Felfner	Athletics	Men's javelin throw	25 June
Bronze	Vladyslav Mykytas	Muaythai	Men's 60 kg	26 June
Bronze	Anastasiia Mykhailenko	Muaythai	Women's 51 kg	26 June
Bronze	Volodymyr Stankevych	Fencing	Men's épée	27 June
Bronze	Artem Melnyk	Kickboxing	Men's 86 kg Full Contact	1 July

== Competitors ==
Ukraine was represented by the maximum number of athletes in beach soccer, fencing, judo, and modern pentathlon.

Ukraine was not able to qualify for the rugby sevens competition since the teams withdrew from the 2022 Rugby Europe Sevens Trophy and 2022 Rugby Europe Women's Sevens Championship Series due to the Russian invasion of Ukraine.

Ukraine did not qualify for the beach handball competitions. The closest were men's team that finished 8th at the EHF Beach Handball EURO 2023 in Nazaré, Portugal, losing to Croatia in the 7th place game. To qualify, the team should have finished within the Top-7. The women's team ranked 10th.

Sport	Men	Women	Total
Archery	3	2	5
Artistic swimming	—	11	11
Athletics	23	21	44
Badminton	3	3	6
Basketball	—	4	4
Beach soccer	12	12	24
Boxing	7	6	13
Breakdancing	2	1	3
Canoe slalom	4	3	7
Canoe sprint	9	8	17
Cycling	4	3	7
Diving	7	3	10
Fencing	14	13	27
Judo	6	6	12
Karate	3	4	7
Kickboxing	3	1	4
Modern pentathlon	4	4	8
Muaythai	5	1	6
Shooting	9	10	19
Ski jumping	2	2	4
Sport climbing	2	3	5
Table tennis	3	4	7
Taekwondo	5	3	8
Teqball	2	2	4
Triathlon	1	3	4
Total	133	136	269

== Archery ==
In recurve achery, Ukraine qualified men's team, mixed team and one competitor for the women's event. Men's team returned to the Games after the absence from the 2019 Games. For the third consecutive time, Ukraine competed in the mixed team event. The country made a debut in compound archery after having qualified one female. Pavlova competed at her third European Games.

Recurve

Athlete	Event	Ranking round		Round of 64	Round of 32	Round of 16	Quarterfinals	Semifinals	Final / BM	
Athlete	Event	Score	Seed	Opposition Score	Opposition Score	Opposition Score	Opposition Score	Opposition Score	Opposition Score	Rank
Oleksii Hunbin	Men's individual	664	18	Ronan (IRL); W 7–3	Nespoli (ITA); L 2–6	Did not qualify				
Ivan Kozhokar	Men's individual	676	9	Bye	Duchoň (SVK); L 0–6	Did not qualify				
Artem Ovchynnikov	Men's individual	657	25	Napłoszek (POL); W 6–4	Alvariño (ESP); L 2–6	Did not qualify				
Oleksii Hunbin; Ivan Kozhokar; Artem Ovchynnikov	Men's team	1997	6	—N/a			Spain; L 1–5	Did not qualify		
Anastasia Pavlova	Women's individual	681 GR	1	Bye	Coşkun (TUR); W 6–5	Pitman (GBR); W 6–5	Degn (DEN); W 7–3	Canales (ESP); L 5–6	Rebagliati (ITA); L 4–6	4
Anastasia Pavlova; Ivan Kozhokar	Mixed team	1357	3	—N/a	Bye	Romania; W 5–4	France; W 5–3	Moldova; W 5–4	Spain; L 1–5	2nd place, silver medalist(s)

Compound

Athlete	Event	Ranking round		Round of 16	Quarterfinals	Semifinals	Final / BM	
Athlete	Event	Score	Seed	Opposition Score	Opposition Score	Opposition Score	Opposition Score	Rank
Olha Khomutovska	Women's individual	684	12	Burun (TUR); L 143–147	Did not qualify			

== Artistic swimming ==
The team consisted of 11 athletes, all female. The team therefore did not compete in the mixed doubles events. Ukraine also did not compete in team free routine combination. Hryshko was the only member of the team who had previously competed at the 2015 Games. Olesia Derevianchenko, Sofiia Matsiievska, and Mariia Khovanska were also included in the team roster.

Athlete	Event	Preliminary		Final	
Athlete	Event	Points	Rank	Points	Rank
Vladyslava Aleksiyiva; Maryna Aleksiyiva	Duet technical routine	—N/a		245.0501	4
Vladyslava Aleksiyiva; Maryna Aleksiyiva	Duet free routine	234.0022	2 Q	232.8438	2nd place, silver medalist(s)
Vladyslava Aleksiyiva; Maryna Aleksiyiva; Veronika Hryshko; Marta Fiedina; Daria Moshynska; Anhelina Ovchynnikova; Valeriya Tyshchenko; Anastasiia Shmonina	Team technical routine	—N/a		203.7697	5
Vladyslava Aleksiyiva; Maryna Aleksiyiva; Veronika Hryshko; Marta Fiedina; Daria Moshynska; Anhelina Ovchynnikova; Valeriya Tyshchenko; Anastasiia Shmonina	Team free routine	254.6542	3 Q	222.1939	4
Vladyslava Aleksiyiva; Maryna Aleksiyiva; Veronika Hryshko; Marta Fiedina; Daria Moshynska; Anhelina Ovchynnikova; Valeriya Tyshchenko; Anastasiia Shmonina	Team acrobatic routine	—N/a		208.9800	2nd place, silver medalist(s)

== Athletics ==
Ukraine competed in the second division of the 2023 European Athletics Team Championships which was held in Chorzów during the Games. Ukraine competed in athletics at the European Games for the second consecutive time. Plotitsyna, Ryzhykova, Danylenko, Lyakhova, Kachur, Bekh-Romanchuk, Hatsko — all participated at the 2019 Games.

=== Individual events ===
Track events
Men

Athlete	Event	Result	Rankings	
Athlete	Event	Result	Match rank	Games rank
Andrii Vasyliev	100 m	10.41	4	18
Stanislav Kovalenko	200 m	21.07 SB	8	18
Oleksandr Pohorilko	400 m	45.31 PB	2	7
Oleh Myronets	800 m	1:47.86 PB	3	14
Dmytro Nikolaichuk	1500 m	3:45.44	8	25
Bohdan-Ivan Horodyskyi	5000 m	14:06.00	6	15
Roman Rostykus	3000 metres steeplechase	8:59.73	8	27
Oleh Kukota	110 m hurdles	14.08 PB	8	22
Rostyslav Holubovych	400 m hurdles	52.01	8	24
Erik Kostrytsia; Andrii Vasyliev; Stanislav Kovalenko; Oleksandr Sokolov	4 × 100 m relay	39.03 SB	1	8

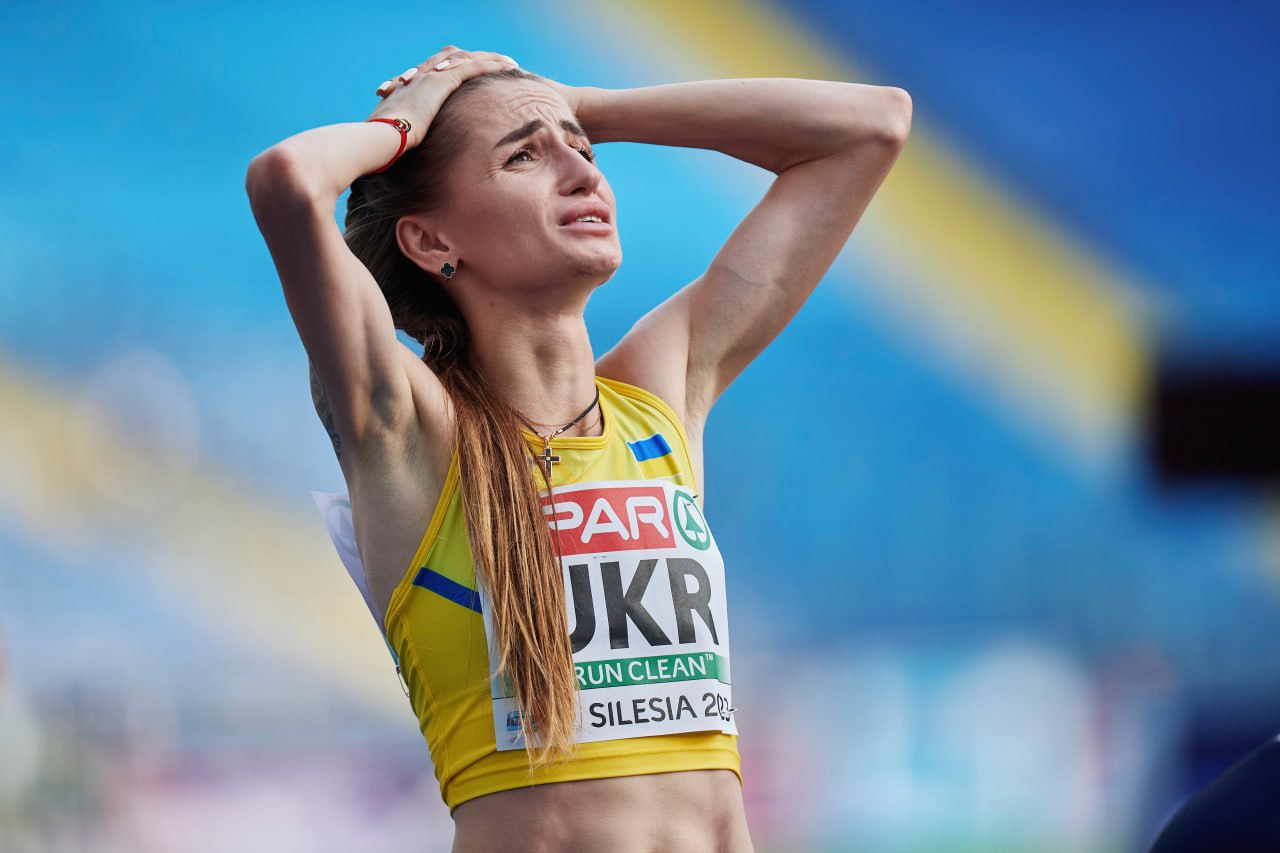
Krol at the Games.

Women

Athlete	Event	Result	Rankings	
Athlete	Event	Result	Match rank	Games rank
Diana Honcharenko	100 m	11.55 PB	6	20
Tetiana Kaisen	200 m	23.28 PB	4	15
Kateryna Karpiuk	400 m	52.45 SB	6	18
Nataliya Krol	800 m	1:59.77 SB	1	1st place, gold medalist(s)
Olha Lyakhova	1500 m	4:10.99 PB	4	4
Valeriia Zinenko	5000 m	15:36.98 PB	4	13
Nataliya Strebkova	3000 metres steeplechase	10:00.17	4	13
Anna Plotitsyna	110 m hurdles	13.18	5	10
Viktoriya Tkachuk	400 m hurdles	55.87	1	8
Olena Radiuk-Kuchuk; Diana Honcharenko; Yana Kachur; Tetiana Kaisen	4 × 100 m relay	DNF		

Mixed

Athlete	Event	Result	Rankings	
Athlete	Event	Result	Match rank	Games rank
Mykyta Barabanov; Kateryna Karpiuk; Oleksandr Pohorilko; Anna Ryzhykova	4 × 400 m relay	3:15.13 SB	3	12

Field events
Men

Athlete	Event	Result	Rankings	
Athlete	Event	Result	Match rank	Games rank
Oleh Doroshchuk	High jump	2.24	3	7
Vladyslav Malykhin	Pole vault	5.40	=1	=13
Serhiy Nykyforov	Long jump	7.56	7	19
Vladyslav Shepeliev	Triple jump	16.67 EU23L	1	3rd place, bronze medalist(s)
Roman Kokoshko	Shot put	20.46	2	6
Mykyta Nesterenko	Discus throw	62.42 SB	4	6
Artur Felfner	Javelin throw	82.24 EU23L	2	3rd place, bronze medalist(s)
Mykhaylo Kokhan	Hammer throw	77.03 SB	1	2nd place, silver medalist(s)

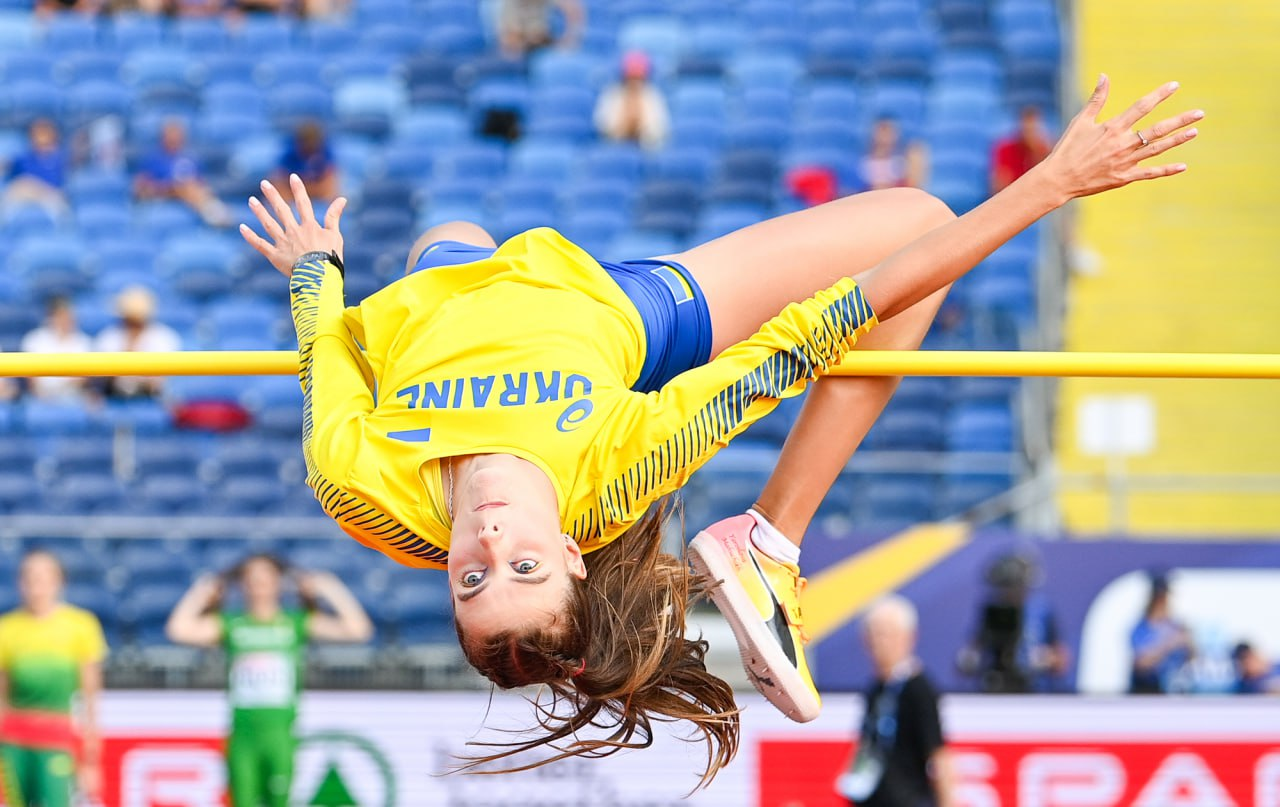
Mahuchikh warming up before the competition round.

Women

Athlete	Event	Result	Rankings	
Athlete	Event	Result	Match rank	Games rank
Yaroslava Mahuchikh	High jump	1.97	1	1st place, gold medalist(s)
Yana Hladiychuk	Pole vault	4.15	4	18
Maryna Bekh-Romanchuk	Long jump	NM		
Maryna Bekh-Romanchuk	Triple jump	14.58	1	1st place, gold medalist(s)
Mariia Larina	Shot put	13.30	13	34
Daria Kozachok	Discus throw	48.61 PB	9	26
Hanna Hatsko	Javelin throw	54.49	8	17
Valeriia Ivanenko-Kyrylina	Hammer throw	61.19	8	22

Reserve athletes

- Danylo Danylenko (mixed 4 × 100 m relay)
- Yevhenii Deulin (men's javelin throw)
- Iryna Herashchenko (women's high jump)
- Ihor Honchar (men's triple jump)
- Oleksandr Honskyi (men's 1500 m)
- Yaroslav Isachenkov (men's long jump)
- Viktoriia Kaliuzhna (women's 5000 m)
- Olena Khamaza (women's hammer throw)
- Danyiila Khavan (women's 4 × 100 m relay)
- Anna Krasutska (women's triple jump)
- Vladyslav Lavskyi (men's high jump)
- Erika Lukach (women's javelin throw)
- Tetiana Melnyk (mixed 4 × 100 m relay)
- Ihor Musiienko (men's shot put)
- Ruslan Naumov (men's 3000 m steeplechase)
- Iryna Nerubalshchuk (women's long jump)
- Oleksandr Onufriiev (men's pole vault)
- Hlib Piskunov (men's hammer throw)
- Illia Popov (men's 4 × 100 m relay)
- Kyrylo Pryhodko (men's 4 × 100 m relay)
- Dmytro Romaniuk (men's 400 m hurdles)
- Nazar Stepanov (men's 110 m hurdles)
- Ruslan Valitov (men's discus throw)
- Vladyslav Yemets (men's 4 × 100 m relay)
- Nataliia Yurchuk (women's 110 m hurdles)

=== Team event ===
(Division II)

Athlete	Points	
Athlete	Men's	Women's
100 m	13	11
200 m	9	13
400 m	15	11
800 m	14	16
1500 m	9	13
5000 m	11	13
3000 m steeplechase	9	13
110 m hurdles	9	12
400 m hurdles	9	16
4 × 100 m relay	16	0
4 × 400 m mixed relay	14	
High jump	14	16
Pole vault	15.5	13
Long jump	10	0
Triple jump	16	16
Shot put	15	4
Discus throw	13	8
Javelin throw	15	9
Hammer throw	16	9
Total points	435.5	
Division rank	2	

== Badminton ==
On 28 March 2023, Badminton Europe published the list of eligible players for the Games and Ukraine was granted quotas in all events with the exception of men's doubles.

Though Beketov and Makhnovskiy did not qualify for the Games directly, they were added later and competed for the second consecutive time at the European Games in men's doubles. Viacheslav Yakovlev and Polina Tkach were eligible for the mixed doubles competition at the Games but they were not included in the final list of participants. Zharka competed at her third European Games, and once again with a different partner in women's doubles. For the first time, Ukraine was not represented in all events.

Athletes	Event	Group stage				Round of 16	Quarterfinals	Semifinals	Final	Rank
Athletes	Event	Opposition Score	Opposition Score	Opposition Score	Rank	Opposition Score	Opposition Score	Opposition Score	Opposition Score	Rank
Danylo Bosniuk	Men's singles	Yanakiev (BUL); L 1–2 (6–21, 21–16, 19–21)	Peñalver (ESP); L 0–2 (19–21, 17–21)	Dwicahyo (AZE); L 0–2 (14–21, 19–21)	4	Did not qualify				
Polina Buhrova	Women's singles	Kjærsfeldt (DEN); L 1–2 (21–10, 10–21, 11–21)	Popovska (BUL); W 2–0 (21–17, 21–19)	Urell (SWE); W w/d	2 Q	Yiğit (TUR); L 0–2 (9–21, 16–21)	Did not qualify			
Glib Beketov; Mykhaylo Makhnovskiy	Men's doubles	Rusev / Stoynov (BUL); L 0–2 (9–21, 12–21)	Hansson / Z-Bexell (SWE); L 0–2 (10–21, 11–21)	Lamsfuß / Seidel (GER); L 0–2 (7–21, 9–21)	4	—N/a	Did not qualify			
Mariia Stoliarenko; Yelyzaveta Zharka	Women's doubles	MacPherson / Torrance (GBR); L 0–2 (17–21, 17–21)	Corsini / Mair (ITA); W 2–0 (21–14, 21–18)	Fruergaard / Thygesen (DEN); L 0–2 (9–21, 13–21)	3	—N/a	Did not qualify			

== Basketball 3x3 ==
Ukraine competed in the women's tournament. Ukraine did not qualify for the men's competition.

This was the third consecutive appearance of Ukraine women's team at the European Games but it was the worst performance. As in 2019, had Ukraine defeated Estonia, they would have qualified for the play-off round. Ukraine led 13–11 against Estonia 1 min 45 sec before the end, but the team eventually lost in a fierce competition 13–14. Veronika Kosmach played at her second consecutive European Games.

Women

- Veronika Kosmach
- Oksana Mollova
- Miriam Uro-Nile
- Krystyna Filevych

Team	Event	Group stage				Quarterfinals	Semifinals	Final / BM	
Team	Event	Opposition Score	Opposition Score	Opposition Score	Rank	Opposition Score	Opposition Score	Opposition Score	Rank
Ukraine	Women's tournament	Poland; W 19–16	Estonia; L 13–14	Lithuania; L 14–21	3	Did not advance			

== Beach soccer ==
Ukraine competed in both men's and women's tournaments. For the men's competition, Ukraine qualified through the 2022 Euro Beach Soccer League where the team finished 6th in the Superfinal. This was the third consecutive time Ukraine team participates at the European Games. For the women's tournament, Ukraine qualified through the 2022 Women's Euro Beach Soccer League where the team played fourth out of 6 teams. Ukraine was represented in both tournaments along with Italy, host Poland, Portugal, and Spain.

The draw for the tournament took place on 11 May 2023. Ukraine men's team was allocated for Group B to play against Switzerland, Italy, and Moldova, while Ukraine women's team was seeded into Group B to face Spain and Italy.

Men

- Andrii Borsuk (2015 and 2019)
- Ihor Borsuk (2015 and 2019)
- Ivan Hlutskyi (2019)
- Dmytro Medvid (2015 and 2019)
- Andrii Nerush (2019)
- Andrii Pashko
- Oleksandr Poslavskyi
- Iurii Shcherytsia
- Dmytro Voitenko (2015 and 2019)
- Maksym Voitiuk
- Yaroslav Zavorotnyi (2019)
- Oleh Zborovskyi (2015 and 2019)
- Oleh Budzko (reserve; 2015)
- Ihor Levchenko (reserve)
- Denys Sabatiuk (reserve)

Team	Event	Group stage				Semifinals / Pl	Final / BM / Pl	
Team	Event	Opposition Score	Opposition Score	Opposition Score	Rank	Opposition Score	Opposition Score	Rank
Ukraine	Men's tournament	Italy; W 6–5	Switzerland; L 2–4	Moldova; W 6–5	3	Azerbaijan; L 6–7	Poland; W 3–2	7

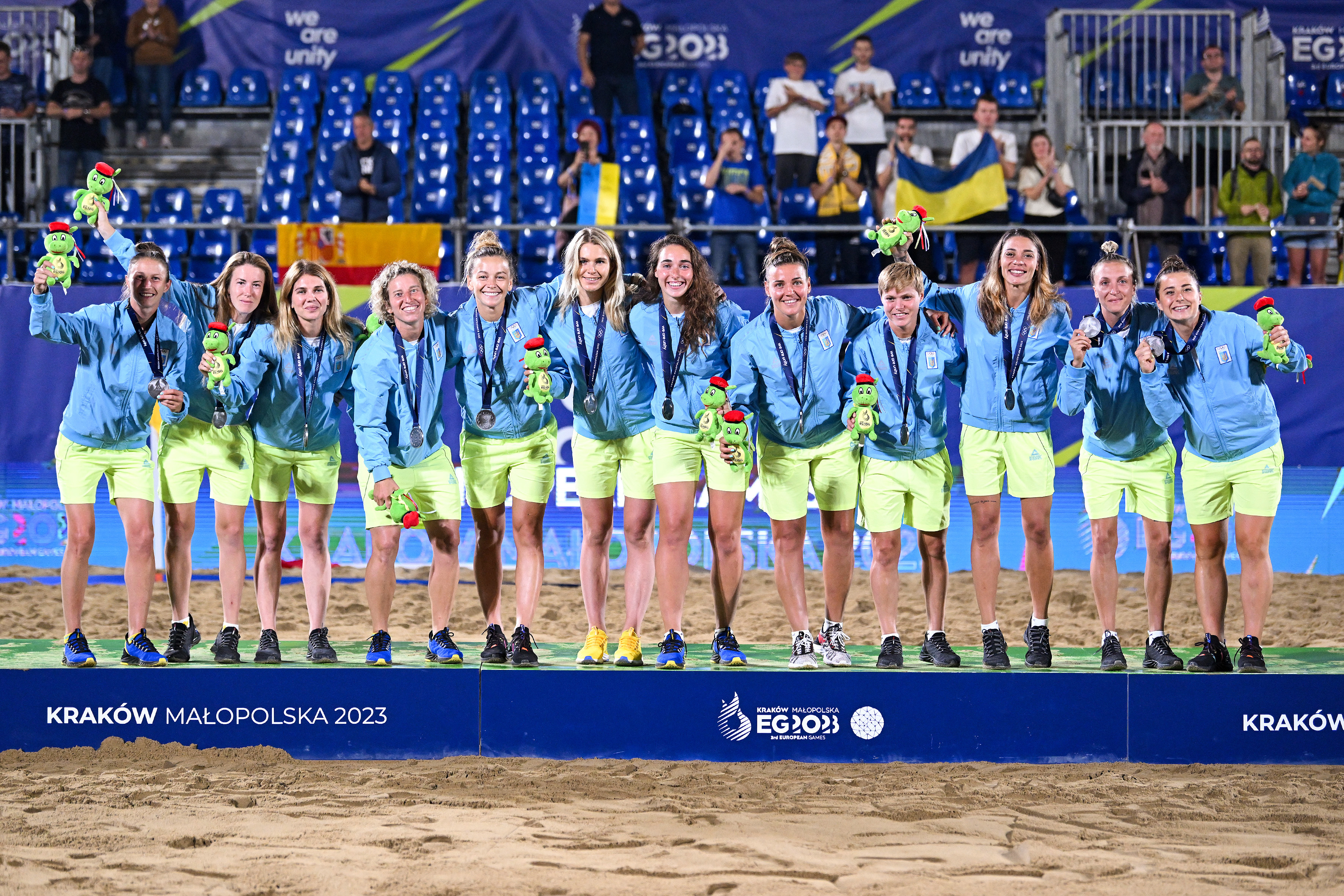
Women's team on podium

Women

- Ania Davydenko
- Iuliia Dekhtiar
- Iryna Dubytska
- Anastasiia Klipachenko
- Iuliia Kostiuk
- Viktoriia Kyslova
- Anna Shulha
- Anastasiia Terekh
- Mariia Tykhonova
- Iryna Vasyliuk
- Snizhana Volovenko
- Myroslava Vypasniak
- Taisiia Babenko (reserve)
- Aliona Kyrylchuk (reserve)

Team	Event	Group stage			Semifinals / Pl	Final / BM / Pl	
Team	Event	Opposition Score	Opposition Score	Rank	Opposition Score	Opposition Score	Rank
Ukraine	Women's tournament	(Spain) Spain; L 4–6	(Italy) Italy; W 2–1	2 Q	(Portugal) Portugal; W 3–1	(Spain) Spain; L 2–2 (pen. 3–5)	2nd place, silver medalist(s)

== Boxing ==
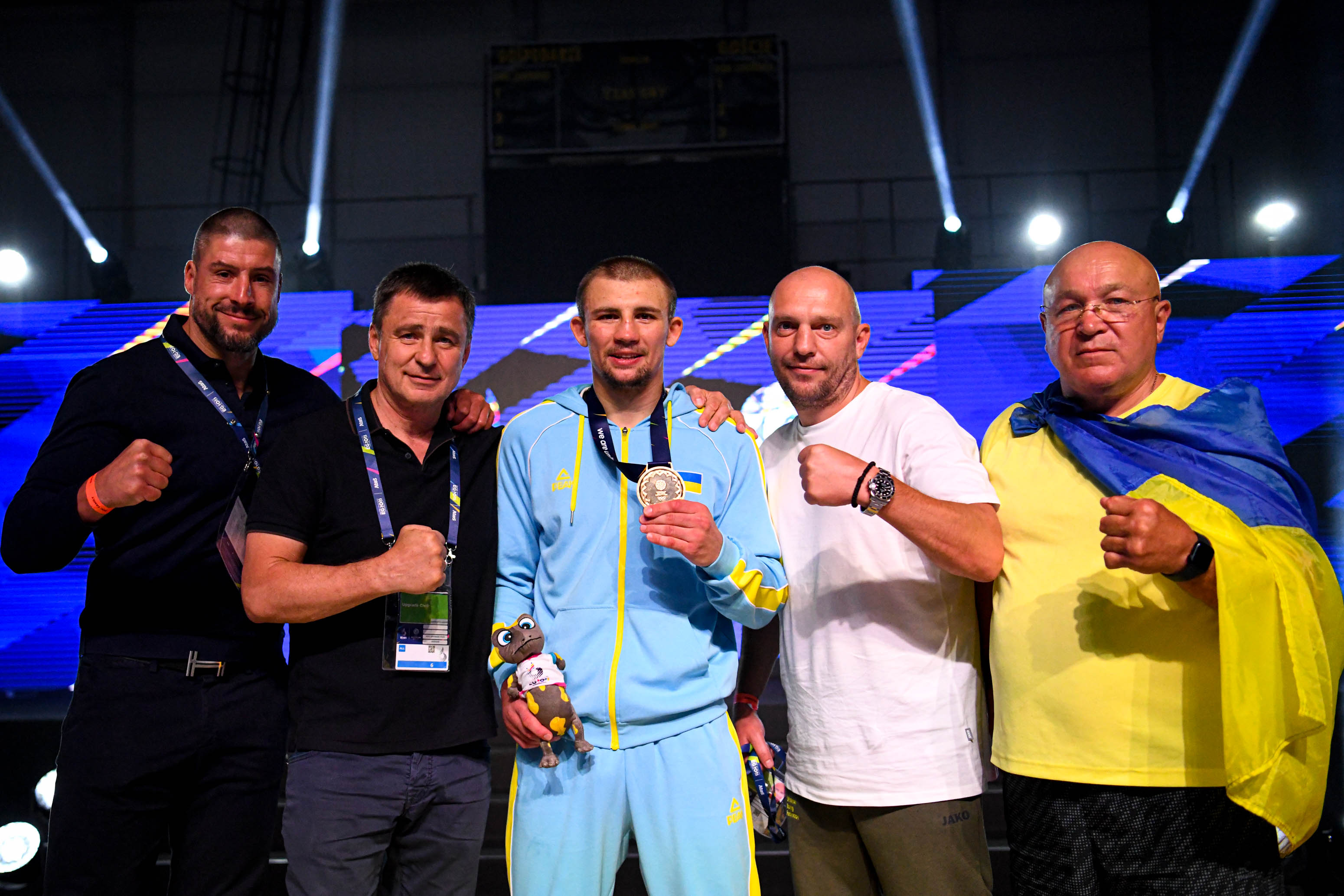
Khyzhniak and Ukrainian coaches after the award ceremony

According to the list published by IBA, 7 male and 6 female boxers were eligible for the Games. Though Robert Marton (92 kg), Yelmir Nabiiev (57 kg), Iurii Shestak (63,5 kg; participant of the 2015 and 2019 European Games), Amina Abramova (60 kg), Maryna Malovana (75 kg), Hanna Okhota (50 kg) and Valeriia Yeroshenko (57 kg) were eligible for the Games according to the IBA's list, they were not included in the final list. Oleh Chuliacheiev (57 kg) was reserve athlete. Zamotayev, Khyzhniak and Kob competed at their third European Games. Khartsyz competed for the second time after he participated in the 2019 Games.

Ukrainian athletes competed in all events. In terms of number of medals won, these were the least successful Games for the Ukrainian team.

Men

Athlete	Category	Round of 32	Round of 16	Quarterfinals	Semifinals	Final	
Athlete	Category	Opposition Result	Opposition Result	Opposition Result	Opposition Result	Opposition Result	Rank
Dmytro Zamotayev	Flyweight	Bye	Gümüş (TUR); L 1–3	Did not qualify			
Taras Bondarchuk	Featherweight	Rahimić (BIH); W 5–0	Ibáñez (BUL); L 0–5	Did not qualify			
Yaroslav Khartsyz	Light welterweight	Hansen (GER); L 1–4	Did not qualify				
Yurii Zakharieiev	Light middleweight	Durkacz (POL); W 3–2	Erdemir (TUR); L 2–3	Did not qualify			
Oleksandr Khyzhniak	Light heavyweight	Kushitashvili (GEO); W RSC-R3	Tsamalidis (GRE); W 5–0	Cassidy (IRL); W 3–0	Cavallaro (ITA); W 5–0	Veočić (CRO); W RSC-R2	1st place, gold medalist(s)
Arkadiy Kartsan	Heavyweight	Yordanyan (GEO); W 5–0	Mouhidiine (ITA); L 0–5	Did not qualify			
Dmytro Lovchynskyi	Super heavyweight	Bye	Ghadfa (ESP); L 0–5	Did not qualify			

Women

Athlete	Category	Round of 32	Round of 16	Quarterfinals	Semifinals	Final	
Athlete	Category	Opposition Result	Opposition Result	Opposition Result	Opposition Result	Opposition Result	Rank
Tetyana Kob	Light flyweight	Kaivo-Oja (FIN); W 4–1	Moorehouse (IRL); L 1–4	Did not qualify			
Anastasia Kovalchuk	Bantamweight	Oraščanin (BIH); W WO	Petrova (BUL); L 0–5	Did not qualify			
Marianna Basanets	Featherweight	Vojić (BIH); W RSC-R1	Fernández (ESP); L 0–5	Did not qualify			
Hanna Okhrei	Lightweight	Bohatjuk (BIH); W 5–0	Arroyo Rodriguez (ESP); W 4–1	Özer (TUR); L 0–5	Did not qualify		
Mariia Bova	Welterweight	Bye	Beeloo (NED); L 1–4	Did not qualify			
Anastasia Chernokolenko	Middleweight	Bye	Wójcik (POL); L 0–5	Did not qualify			

== Breakdancing ==
Athlete	Event	Group stage				Quarterfinals	Semifinals	Final	
Athlete	Event	Opposition Score	Opposition Score	Opposition Score	Rank	Opposition Score	Opposition Score	Opposition Score	Rank
Oleksandr Hatyn-Lozynskyi (Lussy Sky)	B-Boys'	Snap (ITA); W 2–0 (17–1)	Dany (FRA); D 1–1 (9–9)	Lagaet (FRA); L 0–2 (3–15)	3	Did not qualify			
Oleh Kuznietsov (Kuzya)	B-Boys'	Xak (ESP); W 2–0 (16–2)	Lil Zoo (AUT); L 0–2 (0–18)	Cis (BEL); W 2–0 (13–5)	2 Q	Dany (FRA); L 0–2 (4–14)	Did not qualify		
Anna Ponomarenko (Stefani)	B-Girls'	Vanessa (POR); W 2–0 (15–3)	Camine (BEL); W 2–0 (15–3)	Nadia (ISR); W 2–0 (18–0)	1 Q	Senorita Carlota (FRA); W 2–0 (13–5)	Nicka (LTU); W 2–1 (17–10)	India (NED); L 0–3 (2–25)	2nd place, silver medalist(s)

== Canoeing ==
=== Slalom ===
Ukraine did not compete in women's C1 team.

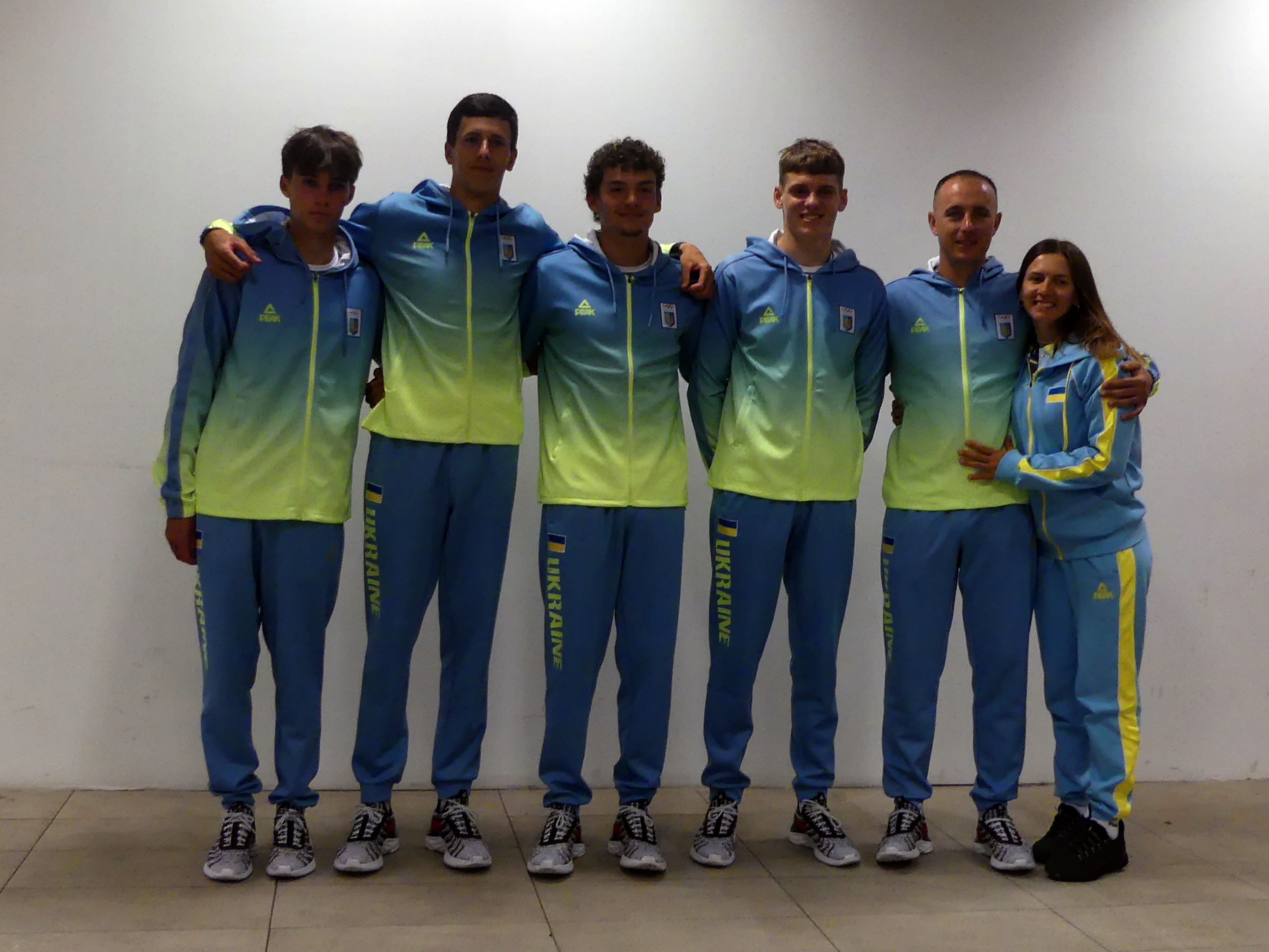
From left to right: Ivchenko, Fedorenko, Sovko, Korniychuk, Lychko.

Men

Athlete	Event	Qualification				Quarterfinal		Semifinal		Final	
Athlete	Event	Run 1	Rank	Run 2	Rank	Time	Rank	Time	Rank	Time	Rank
Serhiy Sovko	Men's K-1	94.45	39	98.63	16	—N/a		Did not qualify			
Serhiy Sovko	Men's C-1	128.87	39	117.29	18	—N/a		Did not qualify			
Serhiy Sovko	Men's K-1 cross	70.26	29	—N/a		Did not qualify					
Oleksandr Fedorenko	Men's K-1	98.80	45	93.26	11	—N/a		Did not qualify			
Oleksandr Fedorenko	Men's C-1	113.48	35	113.96	16	—N/a		Did not qualify			
Oleksandr Fedorenko	Men's K-1 cross	68.65	26	—N/a		Did not qualify					
Artem Ivchenko	Men's K-1	100.37	47	99.75	18	—N/a		Did not qualify			
Artem Ivchenko	Men's K-1 cross	73.16	33	—N/a		Did not qualify					
Maksym Korniychuk	Men's C-1	112.01	34	127.63	20	—N/a		Did not qualify			
Serhiy Sovko; Oleksandr Fedorenko; Artem Ivchenko	Men's K-1 team	—N/a								175.11	16
Serhiy Sovko; Oleksandr Fedorenko; Maksym Korniychuk	Men's C-1 team	—N/a								208.62	11

Women

Athlete	Event	Preliminary				Quarterfinal		Semifinal		Final	
Athlete	Event	Run 1	Rank	Run 2	Rank	Time	Rank	Time	Rank	Time	Rank
Viktoriia Us	Women's K-1	101.15	20 Q	Bye		—N/a		110.50	22	Did not qualify	
Viktoriia Us	Women's C-1	112.42	20 Q	Bye		—N/a		121.77	21	Did not qualify	
Viktoriia Us	Women's K-1 cross	69.35	9 Q	—N/a		2 Q		1 Q		1st place, gold medalist(s)	
Viktoria Dobrotvorska	Women's K-1	118.76	37	120.07	17	—N/a		Did not qualify			
Viktoria Dobrotvorska	Women's C-1	112.81	21	107.09	2 Q	—N/a		132.93	26	Did not qualify	
Viktoria Dobrotvorska	Women's K-1 cross	73.73	29	—N/a		Did not qualify					
Anna Lychko	Women's K-1	129.13	38	121.30	19	—N/a		Did not qualify			
Anna Lychko	Women's K-1 cross	82.70	39	—N/a		Did not qualify					
Viktoriia Us; Viktoria Dobrotvorska; Anna Lychko	Women's K-1 team	—N/a								134.48	10

=== Sprint ===
For Povkh and Hryshchun, these were third consecutive European Games. Mishchuk and Trunov previously competed at the 2015 Games. Rybachok, Danylenko, Kukharyk, Luzan and Dokiienko previously competed at the 2019 Games. Ukraine did not compete in men's K-1 500 m and women's K-2 500 m.

The Games were the most successful for the team in comparison to 2015 and 2019 in terms of both quality and quantity of medals. The team became the most successful in the sport at the Games.

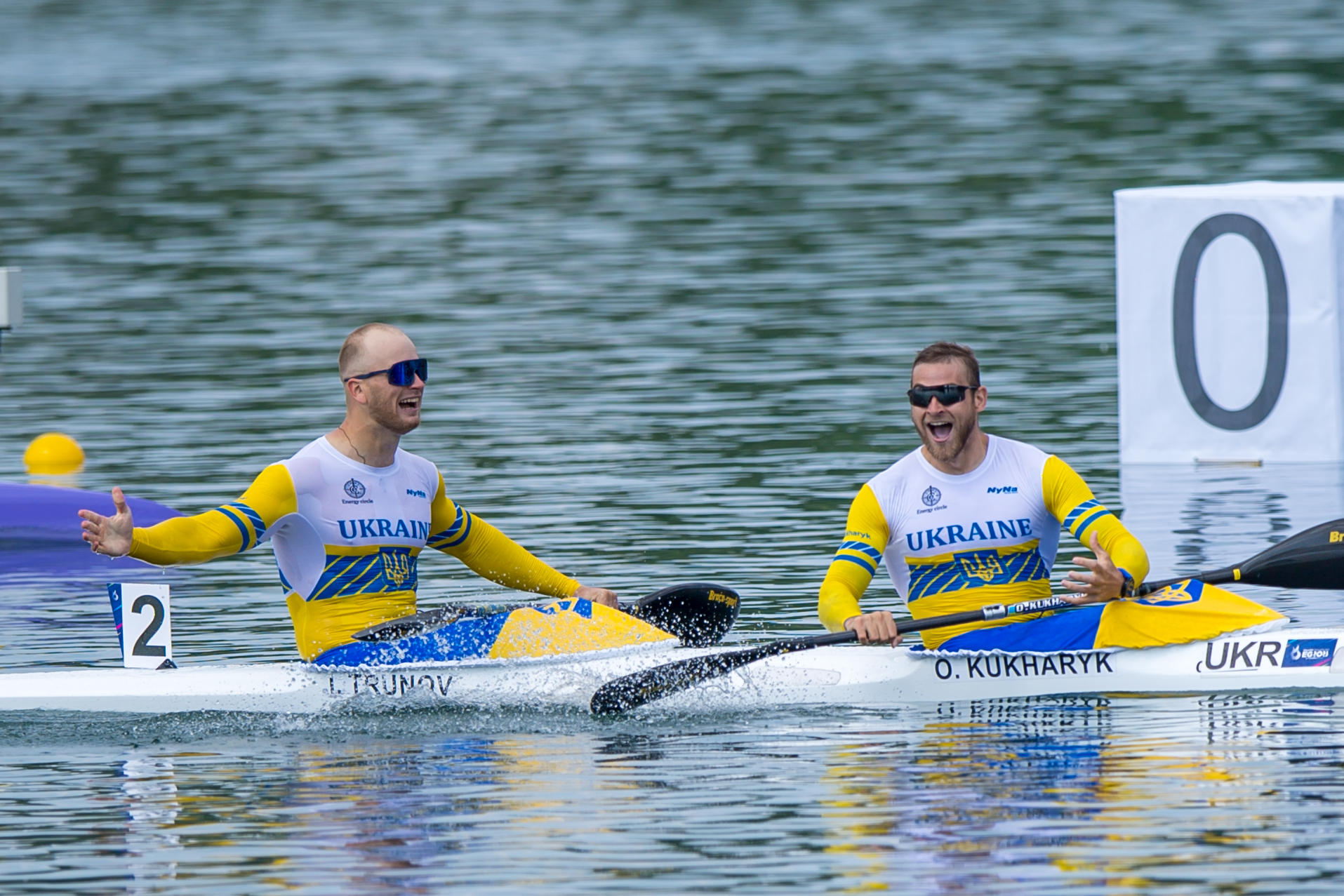
Oleh Kukharyk and Ihor Trunov after the final race.

Men

Athlete	Event	Heat		Semi-final		Final	
Athlete	Event	Time	Rank	Time	Rank	Time	Rank
Taras Mishchuk	C-1 200 m	40.016	5 SF	41.140	4	Did not qualify	
Taras Mazovskyi	C-1 500 m	1:51.430	4 SF	1:53.313	5	Did not qualify	
Vitaliy Vergeles; Andrii Rybachok	C-2 500 m	1:44.244	5 SF	1:44.300	3 F	1:41.903	8
Oleksandr Zaitsev	K-1 200 m	35.107	4 SF	35.809	1 F	37.535	7
Oleh Kukharyk; Ihor Trunov	K-2 500 m	1:31.047	4 SF	1:30.398	2 FA	1:28.928	1st place, gold medalist(s)
Dmytro Danylenko; Oleh Kukharyk; Ivan Semykin; Ihor Trunov	K-4 500 m	1:21:268	2 F	Bye		1:20.500	2nd place, silver medalist(s)

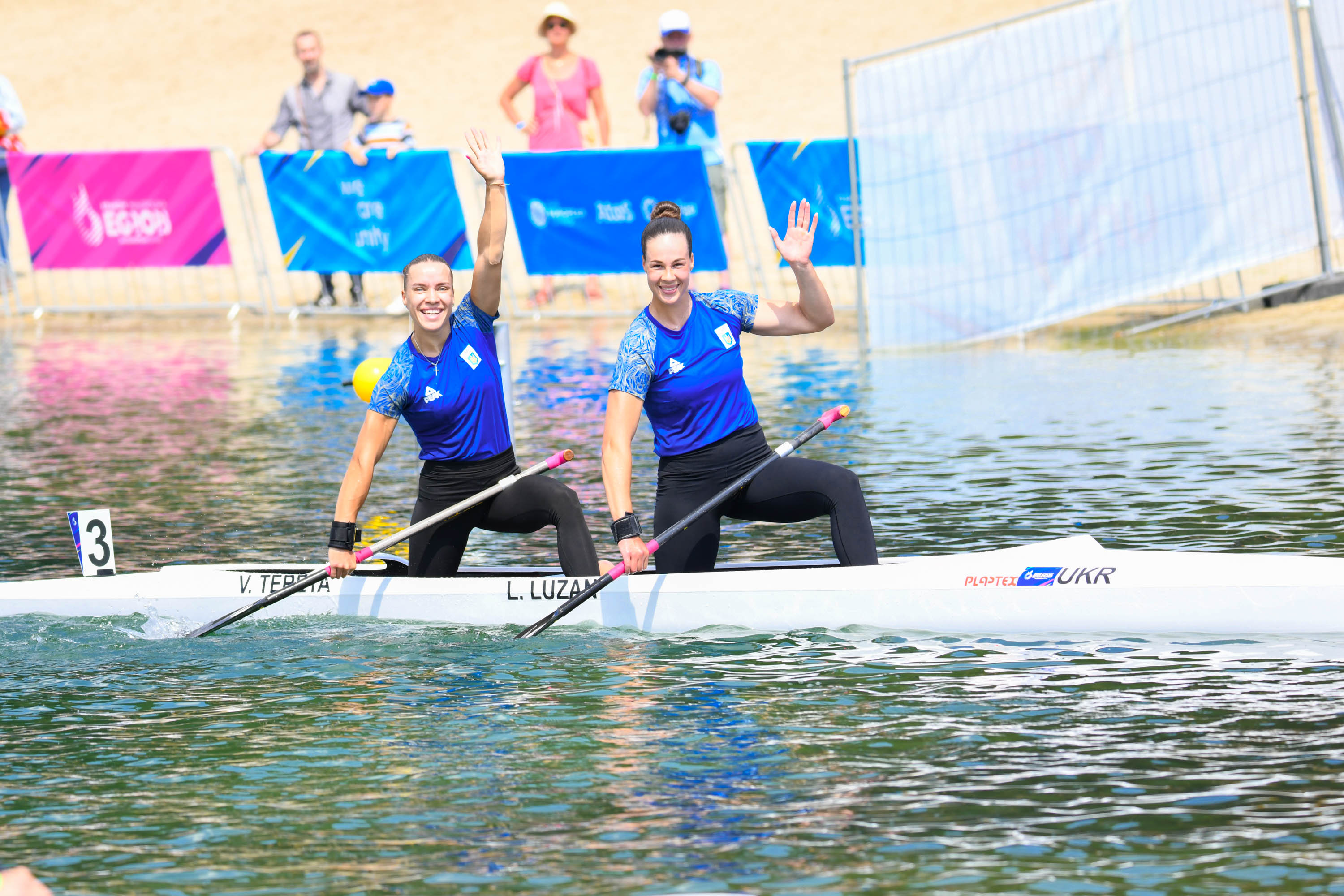
Liudmyla Luzan and Valeriia Tereta.

Women

Athlete	Event	Heat		Semi-final		Final	
Athlete	Event	Time	Rank	Time	Rank	Time	Rank
Liudmyla Luzan	C-1 200 m	46.218	1 F	Bye		46.937	2nd place, silver medalist(s)
Liudmyla Luzan	C-1 500 m	—N/a				2:02.920 EB	1st place, gold medalist(s)
Liudmyla Luzan; Valeriia Tereta	C-2 500 m	1:59.152	2 F	Bye		1:58.233	1st place, gold medalist(s)
Diana Rybak	K-1 200 m	41.565	5 SF	42.355	2 F	42.908	9
Mariya Povkh	K-1 500 m	1:54.246	2 SF	1:54.821	4 FB	1:52.302	9
Nataliia Dokiienko; Diana Tanko; Inna Hryshchun; Hanna Pavlova	K-4 500 m	1:34.699	4 SF	1:35.342	2 F	1:34.561	=5

Mixed

Athlete	Event	Heat		Semi-final		Final	
Athlete	Event	Time	Rank	Time	Rank	Time	Rank
Vitaliy Vergeles; Valeriia Tereta	C-2 200 m	42.620	4 SF	40.494	1 F	41.525	6
Nataliia Dokiienko; Oleksandr Zaitsev	K-2 200 m	35.074	1 FA	Bye		34.888	4

== Cycling ==
Ukraine did not compete in women's BMX. The country was, as in 2015, represented in men's BMX and in mountain bike. Rysenko and Belomoyna raced at their second European Games.

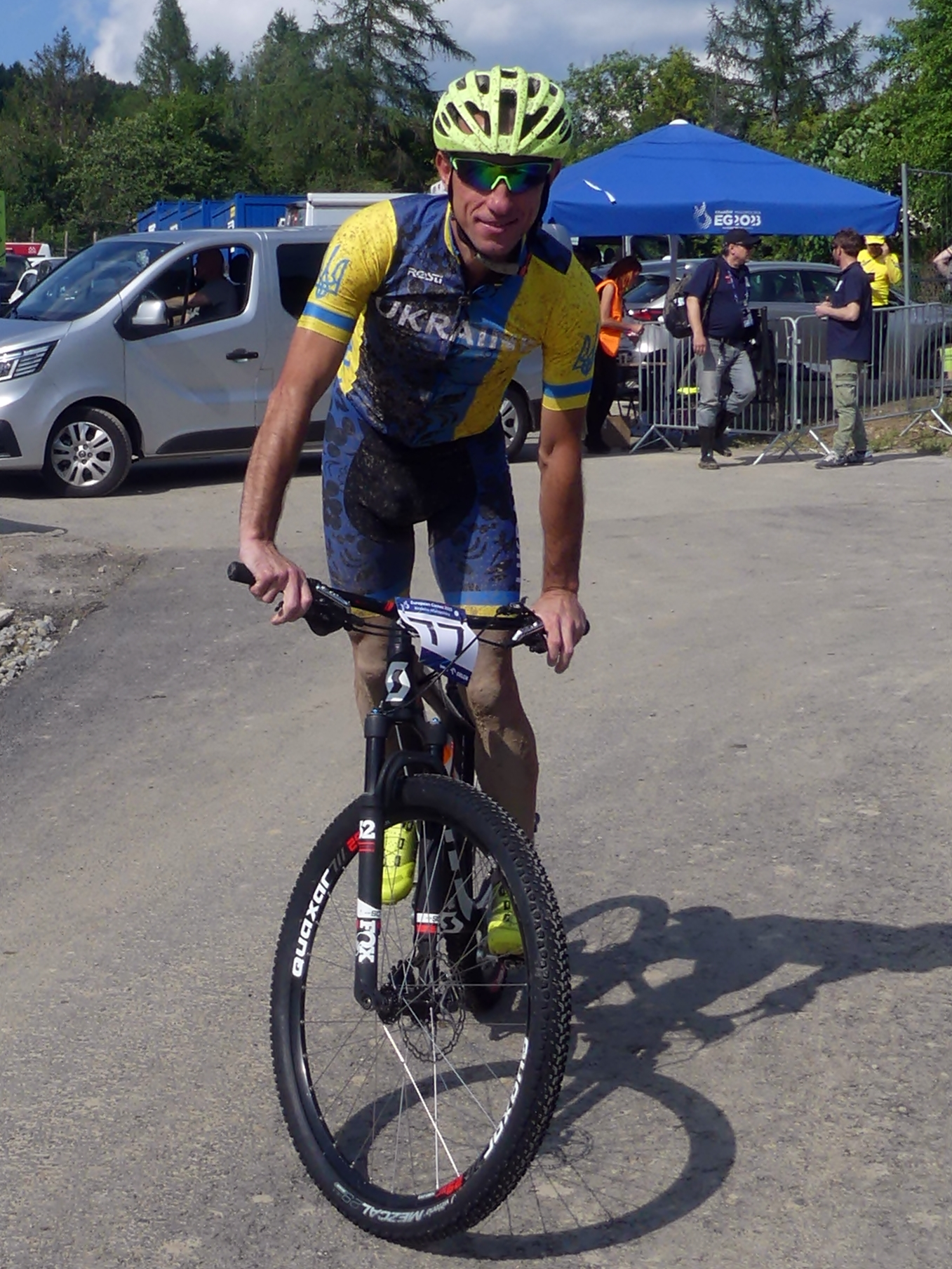
Rysenko at the Games.

=== Mountain bike ===
Athlete	Event	Time	Rank
Serhiy Rysenko	Men's cross country	1LAP	NR
Oleksandr Koniaiev	Men's cross country	2LAP	NR
Dmytro Titarenko	Men's cross country	1:28:44	51
Yana Belomoyna	Women's cross country	1:24:50	24
Iryna Popova	Women's cross country	1LAP	NR
Iryna Slobodian	Women's cross country	1LAP	NR

=== BMX (park) ===
Athlete	Event	Qualification				Final			
Athlete	Event	Run 1	Run 2	Average	Rank	Run 1	Run 2	Average	Rank
Yurii Illiushchenko	Men's BMX park	60.33 (22)	83.16 (2)	71.75	13	Did not qualify			

== Diving ==
Ukraine entered 10 athletes for the Games. Naumenko was the only Ukrainian diver who competed at both 2015 and 2023 European Games. Mark Hrytsenko and Sofiia Lyskun were reserve athletes. The team became the most successful in the sport at the Games.

Men

Athlete	Event	Qualification		Final	
Athlete	Event	Points	Rank	Points	Rank
Danylo Konovalov	Men's 1 metre springboard	355.50	7 Q	375.60	9
Stanislav Oliferchyk	Men's 1 metre springboard	326.00	13	Did not qualify	
Oleh Kolodiy	Men's 3 metre springboard	408.15	3 Q	402.20	5
Danylo Konovalov	Men's 3 metre springboard	383.25	11 Q	371.60	12
Yevhen Naumenko	Men's 10 metre platform	383.15	4 Q	324.80	12
Oleh Kolodiy; Danylo Konovalov	Men's synchronized 3 metre springboard	—N/a		410.16	1st place, gold medalist(s)
Kirill Boliukh; Oleksiy Sereda	Men's synchronized 10 metre platform	—N/a		398.70	1st place, gold medalist(s)

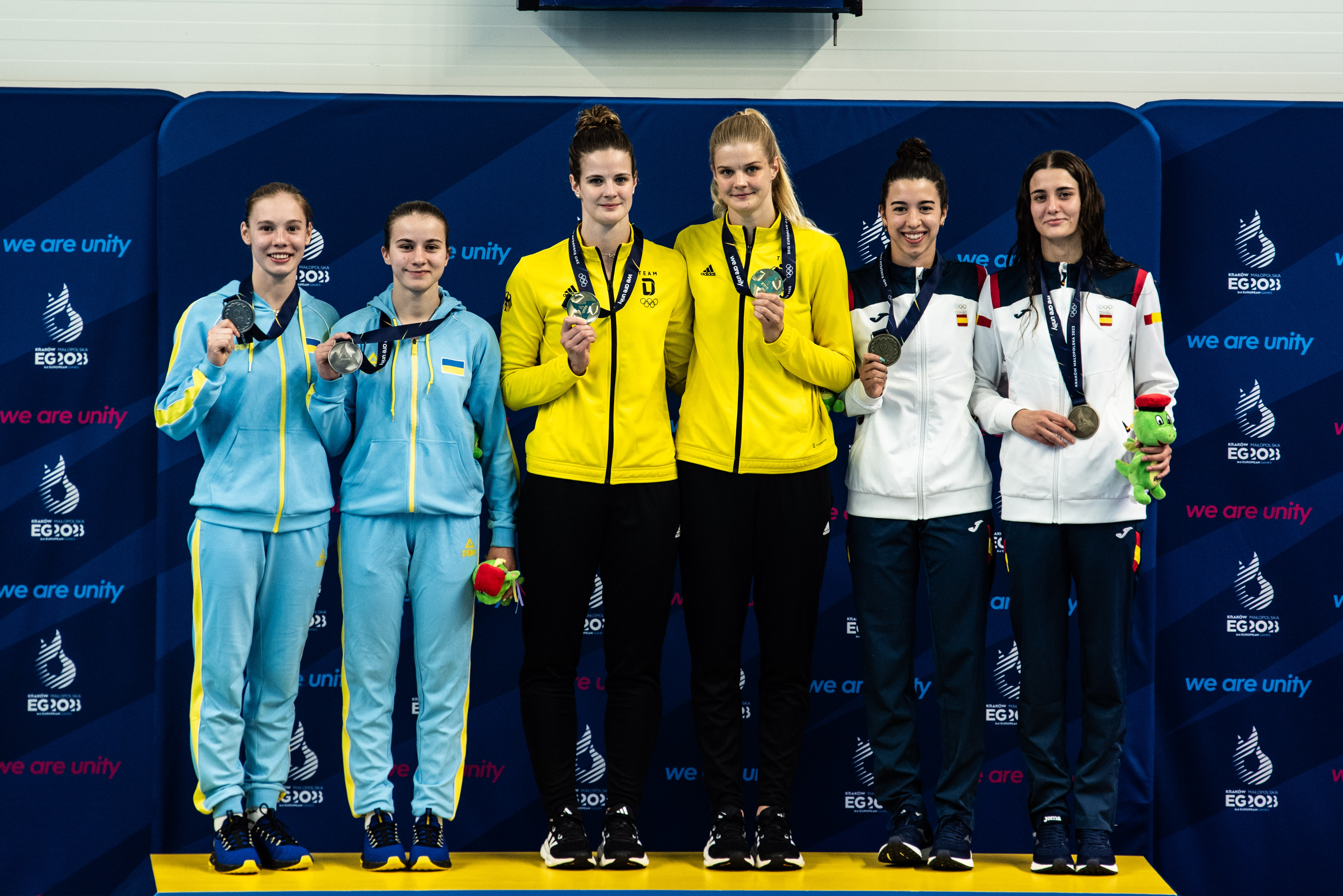
Women's 10 m synchro platform podium at the 2023 European Games.

Women

Athlete	Event	Qualification		Final	
Athlete	Event	Points	Rank	Points	Rank
Hanna Pysmenska	Women's 1 metre springboard	228.25	10 Q	236.80	9
Hanna Pysmenska	Women's 3 metre springboard	240.95	13	Did not qualify	
Kseniya Baylo; Sofia Esman	Women's synchronized 10 metre platform	—N/a		274.68	2nd place, silver medalist(s)

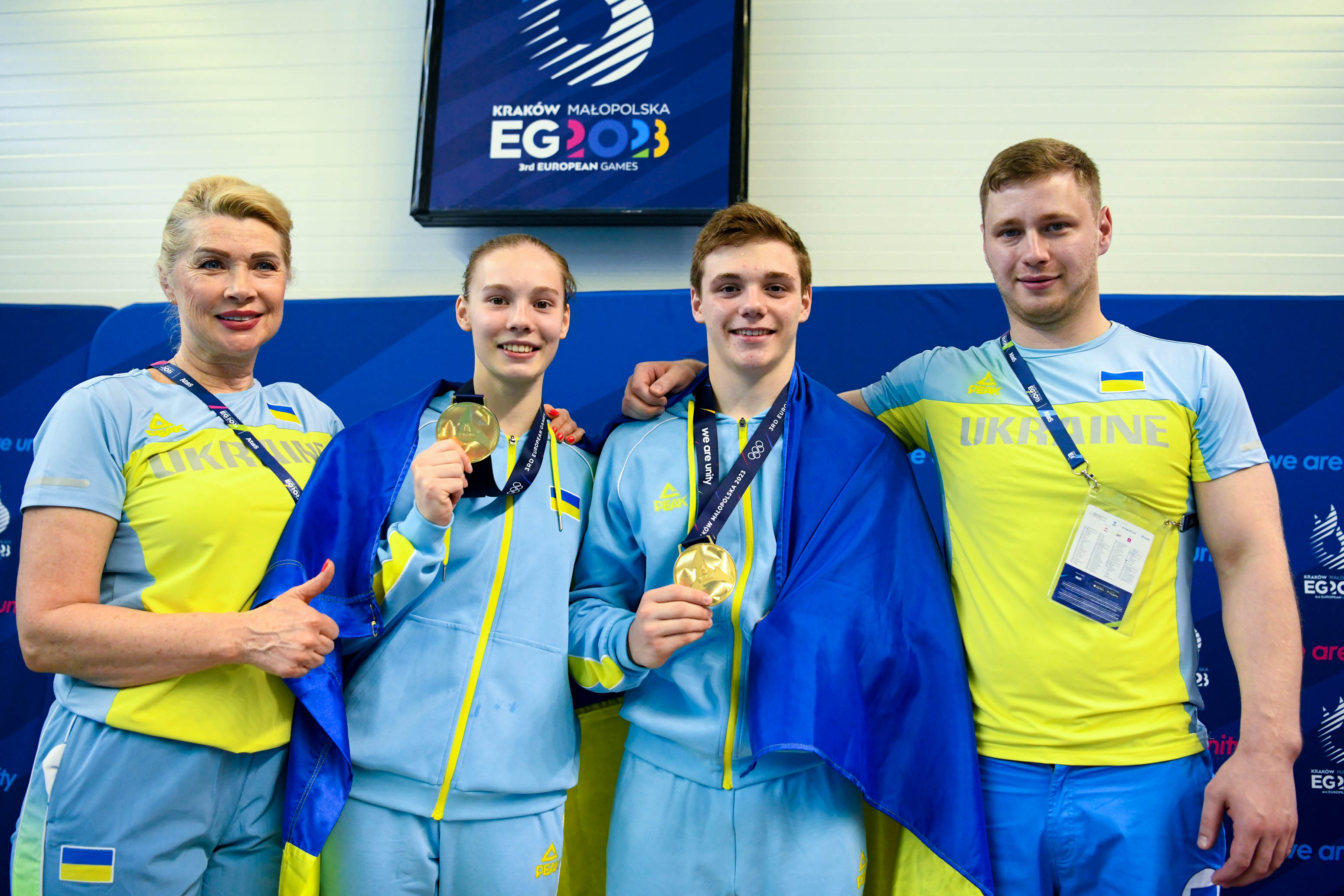
Baylo and Boliukh at the 2023 European Games.

Mixed

Athlete	Event	Final	
Athlete	Event	Points	Rank
Kyrylo Azarov; Hanna Pysmenska	Mixed synchronized 3 metre springboard	246.90	9
Kirill Boliukh; Kseniya Baylo	Mixed synchronized 10 metre platform	322.68	1st place, gold medalist(s)
Danylo Konovalov; Oleksiy Sereda; Kseniya Baylo; Hanna Pysmenska	Mixed team	438.30	1st place, gold medalist(s)

== Fencing ==
Ukraine was represented in all events by maximum number of athletes. Yunes, Yahodka, Komashchuk, Kravatska and Kharlan participated at their second European Games.

Men's

Athlete	Event	Round of 64	Round of 32	Round of 16	Quarterfinals	Semifinals	Final / BM	
Athlete	Event	Opposition Score	Opposition Score	Opposition Score	Opposition Score	Opposition Score	Opposition Score	Rank
Yevhen Makiienko	Épée	Javakhishvili (GEO); W 15–12	Romero (ESP); L 8–9	Did not qualify				
Ihor Reizlin	Épée	Biro (AUT); W 15–5	Unterhauser (GER); W 15–11	Ibanez (ESP); L 13–15	Did not qualify			
Yan Sych	Épée	Loyola (BEL); L 11–15	Did not qualify					
Volodymyr Stankevych	Épée	Bye	Jensen (DEN); W 15–8	Mahringer (AUT); W 15–3	Paavolainen (FIN); W 15–12	Rod (POR); W 15–8	Frazão (POR); L 14–15	3rd place, bronze medalist(s)
Yevhen Makiienko; Nikita Koshman; Volodymyr Stankevych; Yan Sych	Team épée	—N/a	Bye	Germany; W 44–37	Italy; L 28–43	Spain; W 45–42	Czech Republic; W 45–30	5
Danyil Hoida	Foil	Jurkiewicz (POL); L 12–15	Did not qualify					
Rostyslav Hertsyk	Foil	Horn Nielsen (DEN); W 15–13	Pohrebnyak (UKR); L 6–15	Did not qualify				
Andriy Pohrebnyak	Foil	Gaganidze (GEO); W 15–7	Hertsyk (UKR); W 15–6	Filippi (ITA); W 15–14	Winterberg-Poulsen (DEN); L 12–15	Did not qualify		
Klod Yunes	Foil	Poscharnig (AUT); W 15–8	Davis (GBR); W 15–10	Lechner (AUT); W 15–9	Rieger (GER); L 13–15	Did not qualify		
Danyil Hoida; Rostyslav Hertsyk; Andriy Pohrebnyak; Klod Yunes	Team foil	—N/a	Bye	Netherlands; W 45–40	Great Britain; L 37–45	Hungary; L 30–45	Belgium; L 39–45	8
Vasyl Humen	Sabre	Bye	Mandov (BUL); W 15–9	Yahodka (UKR); L 13–15	Did not qualify			
Oleksiy Statsenko	Sabre	Bye	Szatmári (HUN); L 10–15	Did not qualify				
Yuriy Tsap	Sabre	Dick (IRL); W 15–7	Dragomir (ROU); L 13–15	Did not qualify				
Andriy Yahodka	Sabre	Predaris (GRE); W 15–8	Curatoli (ITA); W 15–8	Humen (UKR); W 15–13	Bazadze (GEO); L 11–15	Did not qualify		
Bohdan Platonov; Oleksiy Statsenko; Yuriy Tsap; Andriy Yahodka	Team sabre	—N/a		Bulgaria; W 45–39	France; L 34–45	Georgia; W 45–36	Spain; L 44–45	6

Women's

Athlete	Event	Round of 64	Round of 32	Round of 16	Quarterfinals	Semifinals	Final / BM	
Athlete	Event	Opposition Score	Opposition Score	Opposition Score	Opposition Score	Opposition Score	Opposition Score	Rank
Dzhoan Feybi Bezhura	Épée	Saligerova (CZE); W 15–12	Prosina (LAT); W 15–4	Kirpu (EST); W 15–10	Fransson (SWE); W 15–11	Ehler (GER); W 15–12	Swatowska-Wenglarczyk (POL); W 15–12	1st place, gold medalist(s)
Darya Varfolomeyeva	Épée	Bye	Erturk (TUR); L 11–15	Did not qualify				
Inna Brovko	Épée	Sica (GBR); L 12–15	Did not qualify					
Vlada Kharkova	Épée	Multerer (GER); L 7–8	Did not qualify					
Dzhoan Feybi Bezhura; Inna Brovko; Olena Kryvytska; Vlada Kharkova	Team épée	—N/a	Bye	Czech Republic; W 45–19	Switzerland; L 42–45	Israel; W 45–34	Estonia; W 32–31	5
Kristina Petrova	Foil	Bye	Garyfallou (GRE); W 15–12	Mariño (ESP); W 15–14	Kuritzky (ISR); L 14–15	Did not qualify		
Olha Sopit	Foil	Bye	Dinca (ROU); W 15–1	Poloziuk (UKR); W 15–7	Călugăreanu (ROU); L 12–15	Did not qualify		
Alina Poloziuk	Foil	Bye	Corbu (ROU); W 15–9	Sopit (UKR); L 7–15	Did not qualify			
Dariia Myroniuk	Foil	Brugger (AUT); L 7–10	Did not qualify					
Dariia Myroniuk; Kristina Petrova; Alina Poloziuk; Olha Sopit	Team foil	—N/a		Romania; W 35–34	Italy; L 26–45	Spain; W 45–33	Poland; L 35–45	6
Olha Kharlan	Sabre	Bye	Erbil (TUR); W 15–10	Ilieva (BUL); W 15–13	Gregorio (ITA); W 15–13	Passaro (ITA); W 15–12	Pantis (ROU); W 15–3	1st place, gold medalist(s)
Yuliya Bakastova	Sabre	Perez Cuenca (ESP); W 15–8	Neikova (BUL); L 12–15	Did not qualify				
Alina Komashchuk	Sabre	Bye	Mormile (ITA); L 12–15	Did not qualify				
Olena Kravatska	Sabre	Bye	Ilieva (BUL); L 6–15	Did not qualify				
Yuliya Bakastova; Alina Komashchuk; Olena Kravatska; Olha Kharlan	Team sabre	—N/a		Greece; L 35–45	Did not qualify	Romania; W 45–30	Poland; W 45–42	9

== Judo ==
Iadov, Bilodid and Hrebenozhko competed at their second consecutive European Games.

Mixed team

Athlete	Category	Round of 32	Round of 16	Quarterfinals	Semifinals	Final	
Athlete	Category	Opposition Result	Opposition Result	Opposition Result	Opposition Result	Opposition Result	Rank
Yevhenii Balevskyi; Artem Bubyr; Stanislav Hunchenko; Bohdan Iadov; Vladyslav Kazimirov; Andriy Kolesnyk; Anastasiia Antipina; Daria Bilodid; Ruslana Bulavina; Anastasiia Chyzhevska; Yuliia Hrebenozhko; Yelyzaveta Lytvynenko	Mixed team	Hungary; L 1–4	Did not qualify				

- Ukraine vs. Hungary
  - Vladyslav Kazimirov 1-11 Dániel Szegedi
  - Yuliia Hrebenozhko OS1-10 Szabina Gercsák
  - Artem Bubyr 0-10 Roland Gőz
  - Yelyzaveta Lytvynenko 10-0 Nikolett Sági
  - Yevhenii Balevskyi OS2-10 Richárd Sipőcz
  - Daria Bilodid – Réka Pupp

== Karate ==
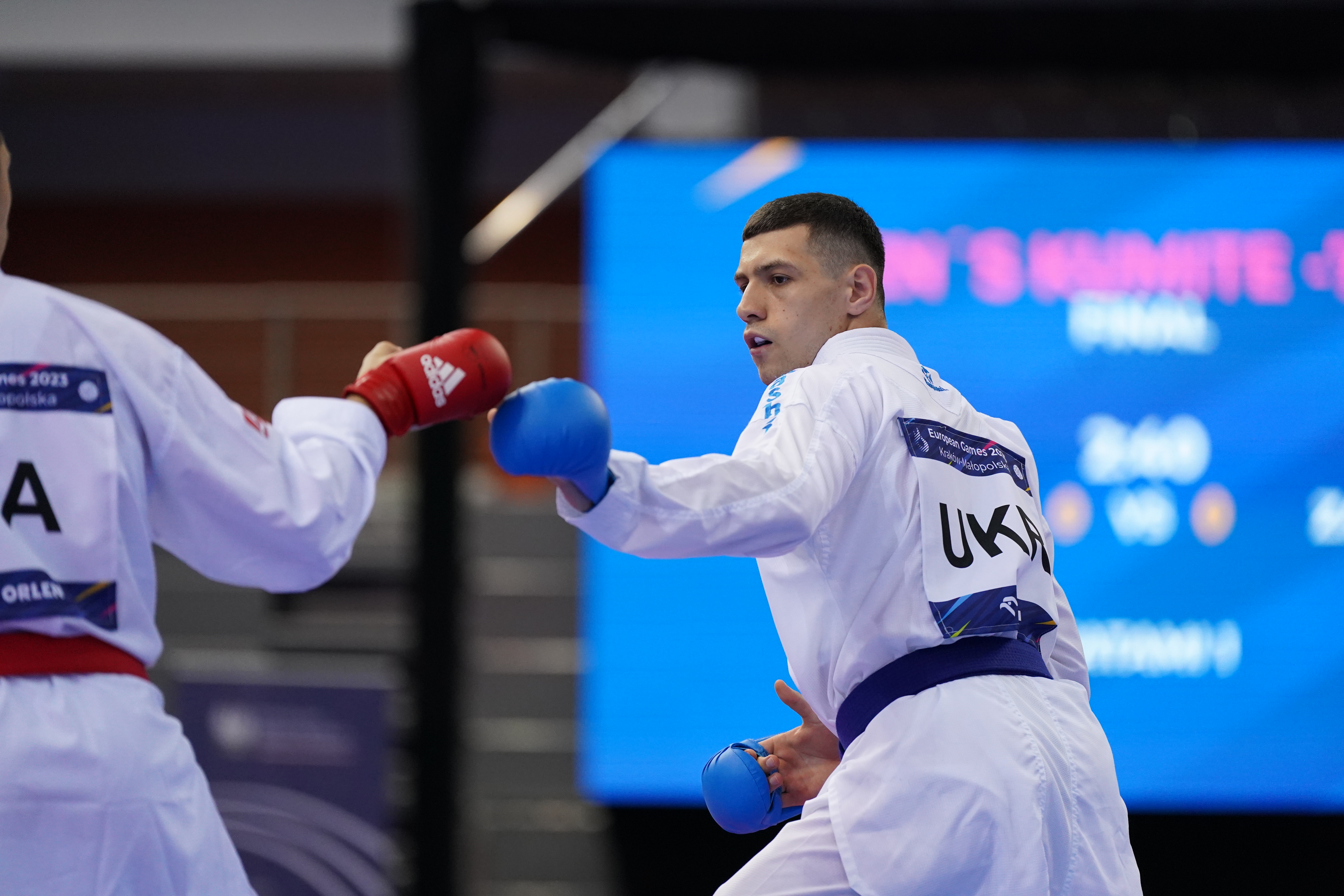
Zaplitnyi competing in the final bout.

Ukraine qualified 7 athletes for the Games. The country was not represented in kata competitions, men's 67 kg and +84 kg as well as women's +68 kg. Terliuga, Serogina, and Zaplitnyi qualified through the 2023 European Karate Championships, and the others qualified through rankings of the World Karate Federation. Kryva competed at her third European Games, while Chobotar, Terliuga, Serogina, and Melnyk competed for the second time.

Ukrainian team became the most successful team in karate competitions. Terliuga and Serogina won their second medals of the European Games.

Men

Athlete	Category	Group stage				Semifinals	Final	
Athlete	Category	Opposition Result	Opposition Result	Opposition Result	Rank	Opposition Result	Opposition Result	Rank
Mykyta Filipov	60 kg	Gehtbarg (ISR); W 1–0	Haas (GER); D 0–0	Crescenzo (ITA); W 2–1	1 Q	Xenos (GRE); L 0–1	Did not qualify	3rd place, bronze medalist(s)
Andrii Zaplitnyi	75 kg	Aghayev (AZE); W 2–1	Gonçalves dos Santos (POR); W 2–0	De Vivo (ITA); W 3–0	1 Q	Mahauden (BEL); W 5–4	De Vivo (ITA); W 3–3	1st place, gold medalist(s)
Valerii Chobotar	84 kg	Martina (ITA); W 5–3	Timmermans (NED); L 0–1	Kiparoidze (GEO); D 1–1	3	Did not qualify		

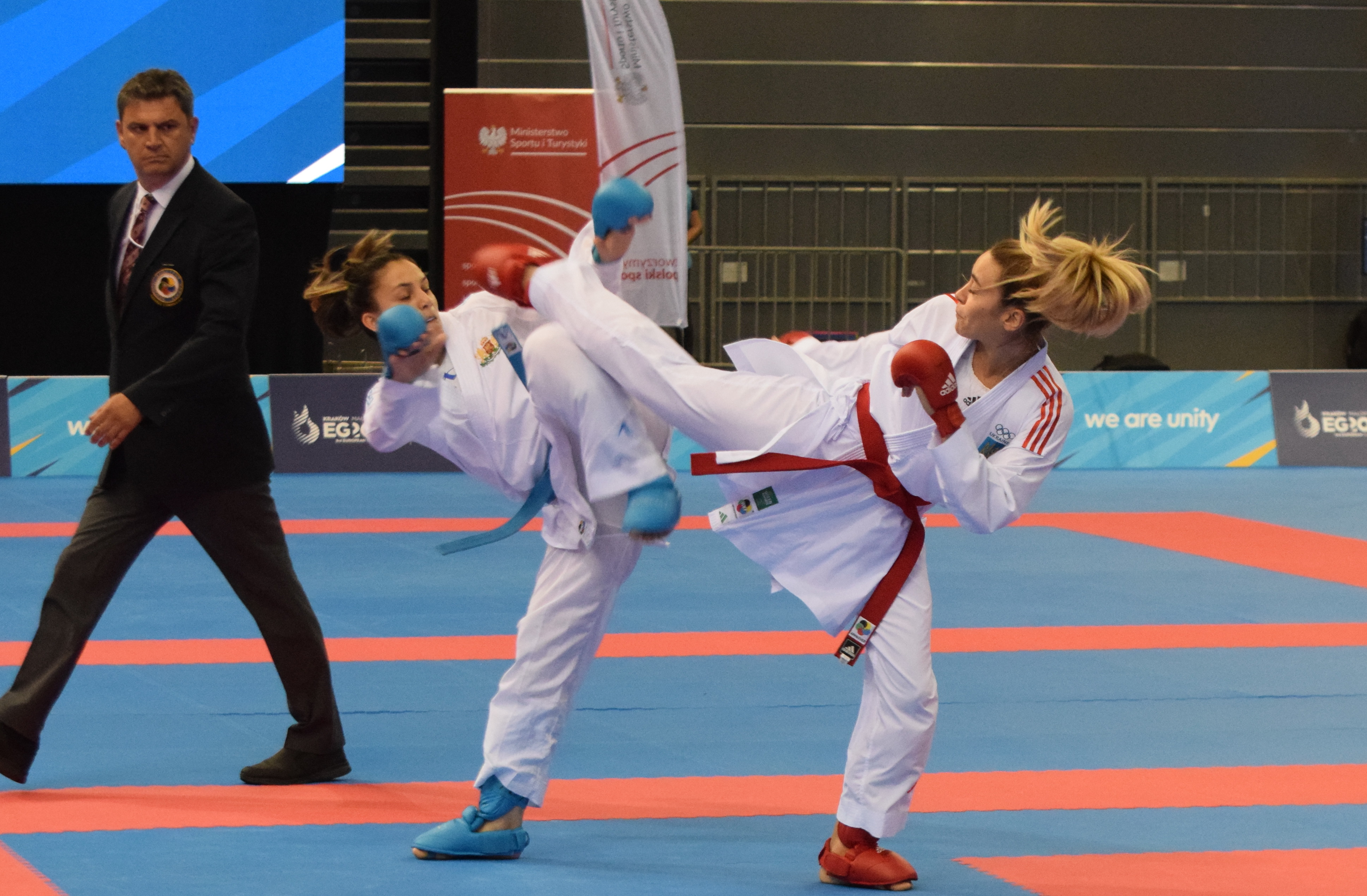
Final bout between Terliuga and Goranova at the 2023 European Games

Women

Athlete	Category	Group stage				Semifinals	Final	
Athlete	Category	Opposition Result	Opposition Result	Opposition Result	Rank	Opposition Result	Opposition Result	Rank
Kateryna Kryva	50 kg	Kontou (CYP); L 0–3	Plank (AUT); L 1–4	Depta (POL); W 1–0	3	Did not qualify		
Anzhelika Terliuga	55 kg	Yakan (TUR); W 4–2	Brunori (ITA); D 0–0	Bugur (GER); W 3–0	1 Q	Warling (LUX); W 2–0	Goranova (BUL); W 2–0	1st place, gold medalist(s)
Anita Serogina	61 kg	Nilsson (SWE); W 4–1	Bakos Suchánková (SVK); W 3–2	Mangiacarpa (ITA); W 5–1	1 Q	Gözütok (TUR); W 2–0	Khamis (GER); L 0–2	2nd place, silver medalist(s)
Halyna Melnyk	68 kg	Zaretska (AZE); L 0–5	Nieto Mejias (ESP); D 4–4	Makyan (ARM); L 0–3	4	Did not qualify		

== Kickboxing ==
Ukraine qualified through the 2022 European Championships 4 athletes (3 male and 1 female) for the Games.

Men

Athlete	Category	Quarterfinals	Semi-finals	Final/Bronze medal bout	
Athlete	Category	Opposition Result	Opposition Result	Opposition Result	Rank
Tymur Brykov	75 kg Full Contact	Haanpaa (FIN); W 3–0	Konovalov (SRB); W 3–0	Shoniya (GEO); L 0–3	2nd place, silver medalist(s)
Artem Melnyk	86 kg Full Contact	Shahbazov (AZE); W 3–0	Hamdi Hajji (ESP); L 1–2	Did not qualify	3rd place, bronze medalist(s)
Pavlo Zamiatin	79 kg Light Contact	Rmadan (GER); L 0–3	Did not qualify		

Women

Athlete	Category	Quarterfinals	Semi-finals	Final/Bronze medal bout	
Athlete	Category	Opposition Result	Opposition Result	Opposition Result	Rank
Mariia Bielkina	52 kg Full Contact	Berg Andersen (NOR); L 0–3	Did not qualify		

== Modern pentathlon ==
Ukraine was represented by the maximum number of athletes.

Qualification and semifinals

Athlete	Event	Qualification											Semifinal												
Athlete	Event	Group	Fencing		Swimming			Laser run			Total points	Final rank	Group	Fencing				Swimming			Laser run			Total points	Final rank
Athlete	Event	Group	RR	Points	Time	Rank	MP points	Times	Rank	MP points	Total points	Final rank	Group	RR	Points	BR	Points	Time	Rank	MP points	Times	Rank	MP points	Total points	Final rank
Pavlo Tymoshchenko	Men's individual	B	11	222	02:08.18	25	294	10:27.40	8	763	1189	10 Q	B	27	200		202	02:08.04	16	294	10:53.10	16	647	1143	17 r
Maksym Aharushev	Men's individual	A	9	215	02:04.84	15	301	10:20.50	9	680	1196	3 Q	A	36	170		172	02:07.57	14	295	10:22.40	8	678	1145	17 r
Yuriy Kovalchuk	Men's individual	B	8	229	02:00.49	8	310	10:51.90	18	649	1188	12 Q	B	31	190		192	02:00.99	4	309	10:12.00	4	688	1189	12 r
Oleksandr Tovkai	Men's individual	A	18	201	01:59.33	5	312	10:18.40	6	682	1195	10 Q	A	3	235		237	02:03.25	9	304	10:35.80	11	665	1206	1 Q
Olha Klunnikova	Women's individual	A	5	236	02:14.90	8	281	12:29.90	12	551	1068	11 Q	A	13	220		224	02:15.42	5	280	11:57.99	17	583	1087	16 r
Iryna Khokhlova	Women's individual	B	2	250	02:20.51	23	269	11:53.90	6	587	1106	5 Q	A	15	220		220	02:20.46	13	270	11:30.90	11	610	1100	10 r
Valeriya Permykina	Women's individual	B	5	236	02:18.54	16	273	11:45.00	8	595	1104	8 Q	B	33	185		185	02:19.59	12	271	11:41.30	15	599	1055	17 r
Anastasia Chyzhova	Women's individual	A	25	180	02:15.72	10	279	11:18.40	21	562	1021	20 r	Did not qualify												

Final

Athlete	Event	Fencing				Show jumping		Swimming			Laser run			Total points	Final rank
Athlete	Event	RR	Points	BR	Points	Rank	MP points	Time	Rank	MP points	Time	Rank	MP points	Total points	Final rank
Oleksandr Tovkai	Men's individual				237	272	17	02:02.17	9	306	10:24.50	11	767	1491	12
Iryna Khokhlova; Yuriy Kovalchuk	Mixed team	6	215		217	11	272	01:59.09	4	312	12:10.30	3	570	1371	6

Men's and Women's Team

Athlete	Event	Points	Rank
Oleksandr Tovkai; Maksym Aharushev; Yuriy Kovalchuk	Men's team	3825	8
Iryna Khokhlova; Olha Klunnikova; Valeriya Permykina	Women's team	3242	7

== Muaythai ==
Ukraine was represented in all men's categories. The team became the most successful in the sport among all national teams at the Games.

Men

Athlete	Category	Quarterfinals	Semi-finals	Final	
Athlete	Category	Opposition Result	Opposition Result	Opposition Result	Rank
Vladyslav Mykytas	60 kg	Nguyen (CZE); W 30–27	Koç (TUR); L 28–29	Did not qualify	3rd place, bronze medalist(s)
Ihor Liubchenko	67 kg	Asimakopoulos (GRE); W RSCS R3	Bylander (SWE); W 30–27	Siegert (POL); W 29–28	1st place, gold medalist(s)
Oleksandr Yefimenko	71 kg	Iannone (ITA); W 30–27	Kubila (FRA); W 30–28	Da Costa Dias Noite (POR); W 30–27	1st place, gold medalist(s)
Yehor Skurikhin	81 kg	Radosz (POL); W 30–27	Malina (CZE); W 30–27	Livadari (MDA); L 27–30	2nd place, silver medalist(s)
Oleh Pryimachov	91 kg	Catipovic (CRO); W 30–26	Bakirtzis (GRE); W 29–28	Pellegrino Pellegri (ITA); W 30–27	1st place, gold medalist(s)

Women

Athlete	Category	Quarterfinals	Semi-finals	Final	
Athlete	Category	Opposition Result	Opposition Result	Opposition Result	Rank
Anastasiia Mykhailenko	51 kg	Meloni (ITA); W 30–27	Dargiel (POL); L 28–29	Did not qualify	3rd place, bronze medalist(s)

== Shooting ==
Ukraine did not compete in women's 10 m air pistol team, men's individual and team trap, women's and mixed team trap, men's and women's skeet team.

Athlete	Event	Qualification		Qualification 2		Final	
Athlete	Event	Points	Rank	Points	Rank	Points	Rank
Pavlo Korostylov	Men's 10 metre air pistol	575	18	—N/a		Did not qualify	
Pavlo Korostylov	Men's 25 metre rapid fire pistol	580	9	—N/a		Did not qualify	
Viktor Bankin	Men's 10 metre air pistol	575	16	—N/a		Did not qualify	
Maksym Horodynets	Men's 25 metre rapid fire pistol	579	11	—N/a		Did not qualify	
Serhiy Kulish	Men's 10 metre air rifle	628.5	10	—N/a		Did not qualify	
Serhiy Kulish	Men's 50 metre rifle three positions	588	11	—N/a		Did not qualify	
Oleh Tsarkov	Men's 10 metre air rifle	627.7	19	—N/a		Did not qualify	
Oleh Tsarkov	Men's 50 metre rifle three positions	580	31	—N/a		Did not qualify	
Mykola Milchev	Men's skeet	73	9	122	13	Did not qualify	
Olena Kostevych	Women's 10 metre air pistol	577	4 Q	—N/a		252.0	3rd place, bronze medalist(s)
Olena Kostevych	Women's 25 metre pistol	582	4 Q	—N/a		9	=6
Polina Kolesnikova	Women's 10 metre air pistol	572	14	—N/a		Did not qualify	
Anastasiia Nimets	Women's 25 metre pistol	579	12	—N/a		Did not qualify	
Natallia Kalnysh	Women's 50 metre rifle three positions	578	24	—N/a		Did not qualify	
Viktoriia Sukhorukova	Women's 10 metre air rifle	626.8	18	—N/a		Did not qualify	
Daria Tykhova	Women's 50 metre rifle three positions	588	7 Q	—N/a		406.3	4
Iryna Malovichko	Women's skeet	71	10	118	11	Did not qualify	
Viktoriia Naumenko	Women's skeet	69	14	116	13	Did not qualify	
Olena Okhotska	Women's trap	105	28	Did not qualify			
Oleh Omelchuk; Pavlo Korostylov; Viktor Bankin	Men's team 10 metre air pistol	866	3 Q	569	7	Did not qualify	
Serhiy Kulish; Oleh Tsarkov; Sviatoslav Hudzyi	Men's team 10 metre air rifle	939.3	7 Q	627.3	4 QBF	Austria; L 2–16	4
Serhiy Kulish; Oleh Tsarkov; Sviatoslav Hudzyi	Men's team 50 metre rifle three positions	1309	9	Did not qualify			
Pavlo Korostylov; Maksym Horodynets; Denys Kushnirov	Men's team 25 metre rapid fire pistol	870	1 Q	563	3 QBF	Italy; L 4–16	4
Daria Tykhova; Viktoriia Sukhorukova; Natallia Kalnysh	Women's team 10 metre air rifle	929.7	12	Did not qualify			
Olena Kostevych; Anastasiia Nimets; Yuliya Korostylova	Women's team 25 metre pistol	877	1 Q	439	1 Q	Poland; W 16–10	1st place, gold medalist(s)
Daria Tykhova; Viktoriia Sukhorukova; Natallia Kalnysh	Women's team 50 metre rifle three positions	1309	8 Q	872	4 QBF	Germany; L 4–16	4
Pavlo Korostylov; Olena Kostevych	Mixed team 10 metre air pistol	575	7	—N/a		Did not qualify	
Viktor Bankin; Polina Kolesnikova	Mixed team 10 metre air pistol	570	19	—N/a		Did not qualify	
Serhiy Kulish; Viktoriia Sukhorukova	Mixed team 10 metre air rifle	623.9	24	—N/a		Did not qualify	
Oleh Tsarkov; Daria Tykhova	Mixed team 10 metre air rifle	625.7	16	—N/a		Did not qualify	
Yuliya Korostylova; Pavlo Korostylov	Mixed team 25 metre pistol	572	2 Q	377	1 Q	Czech Republic; W 16–6	1st place, gold medalist(s)
Anastasiia Nimets; Maksym Horodynets	Mixed team 25 metre pistol	573	1 Q	360	5	Did not qualify	
Serhiy Kulish; Daria Tykhova	Mixed team 50 metre rifle three positions	867	20	Did not qualify			
Oleh Tsarkov; Natallia Kalnysh	Mixed team 50 metre rifle three positions	871	12	Did not qualify			
Iryna Malovichko; Mykola Milchev	Mixed team skeet	147	4 QBF	—N/a		Great Britain; L 4–6	4

== Ski jumping ==
Ukraine competed in all events.

Men

Athlete	Event	First round			Final			Total	
Athlete	Event	Distance	Points	Rank	Distance	Points	Rank	Points	Rank
Vitaliy Kalinichenko	Large hill	118.0	106.3	34	Did not qualify				
Yevhen Marusiak	Large hill	126.0	121.8	17 Q	124.0	116.3	16	238.1	13
Vitaliy Kalinichenko	Normal hill	86.5	90.9	41	Did not qualify				
Yevhen Marusiak	Normal hill	92.0	101.8	33	Did not qualify				

Women

Athlete	Event	First round			Final			Total	
Athlete	Event	Distance	Points	Rank	Distance	Points	Rank	Points	Rank
Tetiana Pylypchuk	Large hill	78.0	22.5	37	Did not qualify				
Tetiana Pylypchuk	Normal hill	67.0	55.6	34	Did not qualify				
Zhanna Hlukhova	Normal hill	63.5	35.8	35	Did not qualify				

Mixed

Athlete	Event	First round			Final			Total	
Athlete	Event	Distance	Points	Rank	Distance	Points	Rank	Points	Rank
Tetiana Pylypchuk; Vitaliy Kalinichenko; Zhanna Hlukhova; Yevhen Marusiak	Mixed team	63.0; 92.5; 65.5; 86.5	26.0; 96.6; 39.1; 81.2	10	Did not qualify			242.9	10

== Sport climbing ==
Ukraine did not compete in men's boulder.

Speed

Athlete	Event	Qualification seeding		Qualification elimination	Quarterfinals	Semi-finals	Final/Bronze medal bout
Athlete	Event	Result	Rank	Opposition Result	Opposition Result	Opposition Result	Rank
Danyil Boldyrev	Men's	6.355	12 q	Dzieński (POL); L 7.976–5.578	Did not advance		
Oksana Burova	Women's	7.855 PB	7 Q	—N/a	Kałucka (POL); L 7.954–6.905	Did not advance	
Alina Shchyharieva	Women's	8.297 PB	8 Q	—N/a	Mirosław (POL); L 18.866–6.841	Did not advance	

Lead and boulder

Athlete	Event	Semifinal		Final	
Athlete	Event	Result	Rank	Result	Rank
Roman Vasko	Men's lead	29+	=14	Did not qualify	
Ievgeniia Kazbekova	Women's lead	39+	10	Did not qualify	
Ievgeniia Kazbekova	Women's boulder	2T4z 4 7	3 Q	2T2z 5 5	4

== Table tennis ==
Ukraine qualified women's team for the competition, which was the third consecutive appearance for the women's team at the European Games.

Individual

Athlete	Event	Round 1	Round 2	Round 3	Round 4	Quarterfinals	Semifinals	Final/Bronze medal game	
Athlete	Event	Opposition Result	Opposition Result	Opposition Result	Opposition Result	Opposition Result	Opposition Result	Opposition Result	Rank
Yaroslav Zhmudenko	Men's singles	Bye	Polanský (CZE); W 4–3	Lind (DEN); L 2–4	Did not qualify				
Yevhen Pryshchepa	Men's singles	Bye	Drinkhall (GBR); L 3–4	Did not qualify					
Margaryta Pesotska	Women's singles	Bye		Madarasz (HUN); L 2–4	Did not qualify				
Solomiya Brateyko	Women's singles	Bye	Carey (GBR); W 4–0	Kukuľková (SVK); W 4–1	Yuan (FRA); L 3–4	Did not qualify			
Anton Limonov; Solomiya Brateyko	Mixed doubles	—N/a			Martinez Robles / Xiao Yao (ESP); L 1–3	Did not qualify			

Team

Athlete	Event	First round	Quarterfinals	Semifinals	Final	
Athlete	Event	Opposition Result	Opposition Result	Opposition Result	Opposition Result	Rank
Hanna Haponova; Margaryta Pesotska; Solomiya Brateyko; Anastasiia Dmytrenko	Women's team	Luxembourg; W 3–2	Portugal; L 1–3	Did not qualify		

- First round

28 June 2023	Luxembourg	2 – 3	Ukraine

Tessy Gonderinger / Sarah De Nutte	0–3	Hanna Haponova / Solomiya Brateyko	10–12, 4–11, 8–11
Ni Xialian	3–1	Margaryta Pesotska	13–11, 11–6, 5–11, 11–8
Sarah De Nutte	1–3	Solomiya Brateyko	14–12, 9–11, 10–12, 10–12
Ni Xialian	3–0	Hanna Haponova	11–8, 11–4, 11–5
Tessy Gonderinger	1–3	Margaryta Pesotska	4–11, 11–8, 5–11, 8–11

- Quarterfinal

29 June 2023	Portugal	3 – 1	Ukraine

Ines Rodrigues de Matos / Fu Yu	3–2	Anastasiia Dmytrenko / Solomiya Brateyko	2–11, 11–4, 11–9, 5–11, 11–4
Shao Jieni	1–3	Margaryta Pesotska	3–11, 11–9, 7–11, 7–11
Fu Yu	3–1	Solomiya Brateyko	12–10, 2–11, 11–1, 11–5
Shao Jieni	3–0	Anastasiia Dmytrenko	11–7, 11–9, 11–5

== Taekwondo ==
Ukraine originally qualified 6 athletes for the Games but the team was able to field two more athletes (namely Chumachenko and Pypot).

Men

Athlete	Category	Round of 16	Quarterfinals/ Repechage 1	Semifinals/ Repechage 2	Final/ Bronze medal bout	
Athlete	Category	Opposition Result	Opposition Result	Opposition Result	Opposition Result	Rank
Volodymyr Bystrov	63 kg	Hyttel (DEN); W 2–0	Jorquera (ESP); L 1–2	Did not advance		
Andrii Chumachenko	68 kg	Sinden (GBR); L 0–2	Joergensen (DEN); L 0–2	Did not advance		
Kostiantyn Kostenevych	80 kg	Ferreira (POR); W 2–0	Piątkowski (POL); L 1–2	Did not advance		
Vladyslav Bondar	87 kg	Bailey (HUN); L 1–2	Did not advance			
Andrii Harbar	+87 kg	El Yazidi (FRA); W 2–0	Georgievski (MKD); L 1–2	Molin (ITA); W 2–0	Božić (CRO); L 0–2	5

Women

Athlete	Category	Round of 16	Quarterfinals/ Repechage 1	Semifinals/ Repechage 2	Final/ Bronze medal bout	
Athlete	Category	Opposition Result	Opposition Result	Opposition Result	Opposition Result	Rank
Viktoriia Nahurna	46 kg	Rehani (FRA); W 2–0	Kouttouki (CYP); L 1–2	Did not advance		
Iryna Pypot	73 kg	Koszel (POL); L 0–2	Did not advance			
Renata Podolian	+73 kg	Kowalczuk (POL); L 0–2	Did not advance	Jahl (AUT); L 0–2	Did not advance	

== Teqball ==
Ukraine competed in all events.

Athletes	Event	Group stage				Quarterfinals	Semifinals	Final	Rank
Athletes	Event	Opposition Score	Opposition Score	Opposition Score	Rank	Opposition Score	Opposition Score	Opposition Score	Rank
Oleh Usychenko	Men's singles	Batalo (CRO); W 2–0	Uka (KOS); L 1–2	—N/a	2 q	Gyoergydeak (ROU); L 0–2	Did not qualify		
Dmytro Shevchuk; Oleh Usychenko	Men's doubles	H-Wellenhof / Neuhold (AUT); W 2–0	Duszak / Pokwap (POL); L 0–2	—N/a	2 q	Banyik / Katz (HUN); L 0–2	Did not qualify		
Daria Zelenska	Women's singles	Mangasaryan (ARM); L 0–2	Hillmann (GER); L 1–2	Julian (FRA); L 0–2	4	Did not qualify			
Daria Zelenska; Kateryna Fesenko	Women's doubles	Parente / Couto (POR); L 0–2	Vasas / Janicsek (HUN); L 0–2	—N/a	3	Did not qualify			
Dmytro Shevchuk; Kateryna Fesenko	Mixed doubles	Pejic / Bungic (CRO); W 2–0	Umicevic / Mitro (SRB); L 0–2	Vardanyan / Mangasaryan (ARM); L 1–2	3	Did not qualify			

== Triathlon ==
Ukraine qualified 3 female (maximum for a singles' event) and 1 male. Since at least two male and two female athletes were required to be qualified for the mixed relay, Ukraine was not represented in this event. In comparison to the 2015 European Games, Ukrainian triathlon team for the 2023 event was two competitors smaller.

Athlete	Event	Time	Difference	Rank
Vitalii Vorontsov	Men	1:50:26	+3:36	33
Kseniia Levkovska	Women	LAP		
Sofiya Pryyma	Women	2:04:45	+7:40	35
Maryna Kyryk	Women	2:06:09	+9:04	39

== Olympic quotas ==
The Games served as qualification event in a number of sports for the 2024 Summer Olympics. Ukraine received following quotas for the results at the Games:

Name	Sport	Event	Date
Olena Kostevych	Shooting	Women's 10 metre air pistol	22 June
(no name)	Shooting	Mixed teams 10 metre air pistol	22 June
Oleksandr Khyzhniak	Boxing	Men's middleweight	28 June
Oleksandr Tovkai	Modern pentathlon	Men's	1 July

== Side events ==
European Amputee Football Federation launched in 2023 the biennial Amputee Football Nations League. The games of League A were scheduled to be played in Kraków before the Games and was advertised as a side event at the Games. Ukraine was included in League C and, therefore, did not play at the Games.

=== Chess ===
Ukraine qualified for the European Blitz Chess Championships which is set to take place during the European Games. The event will comprise one event, mixed pairs, and Ukraine is expected to be represented by Andrii Volokitin and Nataliia Buksa.
