= Shooting at the 2023 European Games – Women's 25 metre pistol =

Women's 25 metre pistol at the 2023 European Games
- Venue: Wrocław Shooting Centre
- Dates: 25–26 June
- Competitors: 35 from 25 nations

Medalists
gold medal	Anna Korakaki	Greece
silver medal	Antoaneta Kostadinova	Bulgaria
bronze medal	Doreen Vennekamp	Germany

The women's 25 metre pistol event at the 2023 European Games took place on 25 and 26 June at the Wrocław Shooting Centre.

== Records ==
Prior to this competition, the existing world, European and Games records were as follows.

Qualification
World Record	Rhythm Sangwan (IND)	595	Baku, Azerbaijan	13 May 2023
European Record	Diana Iorgova (BUL)	594	Milan, Italy	31 May 1994
Games Record	Monika Karsch (GER)	589	Minsk, Belarus	26 June 2019

== Results ==
=== Qualification ===
Rank	Athlete	Country	Precision				Rapid				Total	Notes
Rank	Athlete	Country	Series			ST1	Series			ST2	Total	Notes
Rank	Athlete	Country	1	2	3	ST1	1	2	3	ST2	Total	Notes
1	Veronika Major	Hungary	96	97	98	291	99	98	98	295	586-27x	Q
2	Doreen Vennekamp	Germany	97	94	97	288	100	99	98	297	585-29x	Q
3	Anna Korakaki	Greece	95	98	96	289	97	99	99	295	584-23x	Q
4	Olena Kostevych	Ukraine	95	99	98	292	95	96	99	290	582-18x	Q
5	Antoaneta Kostadinova	Bulgaria	94	96	95	285	97	100	98	295	580-20x	Q
6	Sylvia Steiner	Austria	96	95	97	288	97	98	97	292	580-17x	Q
7	Maria Varricchio	Italy	97	96	97	290	95	98	96	289	579-22x	Q
8	Nino Salukvadze	Georgia	96	98	94	288	98	96	97	291	579-18x	Q
9	Mathilde Lamolle	France	96	96	96	288	96	97	98	291	579-17x	
10	Camille Jedrzejewski	France	94	98	97	289	97	96	97	290	579-17x	
11	Renáta Sike	Hungary	94	95	94	283	99	98	99	296	579-15x	
12	Anastasiia Nimets	Ukraine	94	96	97	287	99	100	93	292	579-14x	
13	Joana Castelão	Portugal	95	97	97	289	97	96	96	289	578-18x	
14	Şevval İlayda Tarhan	Turkey	95	98	97	290	95	98	95	288	578-16x	
15	María Soto	Spain	95	93	95	283	99	99	96	294	577-14x	
16	Stina Lawner	Sweden	95	97	97	289	98	95	95	288	577-13x	
17	Agate Rašmane	Latvia	95	94	94	283	96	99	98	293	576-15x	
18	Klaudia Breś	Poland	96	96	99	291	100	98	85	283	574-21x	
19	Michelle Skeries	Germany	93	94	97	284	93	99	98	290	574-11x	
20	Alžběta Dědová	Czech Republic	92	93	97	282	99	96	96	291	573-13x	
21	Veronika Schejbalová	Czech Republic	100	93	93	286	96	93	97	286	572-14x	
22	Joanna Wawrzonowska	Poland	93	97	96	286	95	96	95	286	572-14x	
23	Carmen Ceballos	Spain	94	96	97	287	90	97	96	283	570-18x	
24	Lenka Gajanová	Slovakia	92	96	92	280	93	97	100	290	570-17x	
25	Nigar Nasirova	Azerbaijan	94	94	94	282	92	99	95	286	568-11x	
26	Denis Bola Ujčič	Slovenia	93	94	96	283	95	94	96	285	568-10x	
27	Chiara Giancamilli	Italy	93	94	90	277	94	96	100	290	567-8x	
28	Miroslava Mincheva	Bulgaria	96	93	95	284	98	98	86	282	566-14x	
29	Jekaterina Ždanova	Lithuania	92	96	95	283	94	95	94	283	566-13x	
30	Jagoda Tkalec	Slovenia	96	95	96	287	91	91	96	278	565-18x	
31	Ann Helen Aune	Norway	92	90	94	276	96	97	96	289	565-8x	
32	Eleanor Bezzina	Malta	96	99	98	293	90	88	93	271	564-10x	
33	Jessica Liddon	Great Britain	97	98	98	293	92	93	83	268	561-17x	
34	Kristina Kiisk	Estonia	93	94	92	279	93	91	96	280	559-10x	
35	Manjola Konini	Albania	91	91	89	271	97	93	93	283	554-6x	

=== Ranking matches ===
Rank	Athlete	Series				Total	Notes
Rank	Athlete	1	2	3	4	Total	Notes
1	Anna Korakaki (GRE)	2	4	5	4	15	Q
2	Antoaneta Kostadinova (BUL)	4	3	4	3	14	Q
3	Veronika Major (HUN)	1	4	3	3	11	
4	Maria Varricchio (ITA)	2	3	2	2	9	

Rank	Athlete	Series				Total	Notes
Rank	Athlete	1	2	3	4	Total	Notes
1	Doreen Vennekamp (GER)	3	3	4	3	13	Q
2	Nino Salukvadze (GEO)	3	2	3	3	11	Q
3	Sylvia Steiner (AUT)	2	3	1	3	9	
3	Olena Kostevych (UKR)	2	3	2	2	9	

=== Medal match ===
Rank	Athlete	Series								Total
Rank	Athlete	1	2	3	4	5	6	7	8	Total
1st place, gold medalist(s)	Anna Korakaki (GRE)	4	3	4	2	5	2	3	4	27
1st place, gold medalist(s)	Anna Korakaki (GRE)	4	7	11	13	18	20	23	27	27
2nd place, silver medalist(s)	Antoaneta Kostadinova (BUL)	3	3	3	3	5	4	2	3	26
2nd place, silver medalist(s)	Antoaneta Kostadinova (BUL)	3	6	9	12	17	21	23	26	26
3rd place, bronze medalist(s)	Doreen Vennekamp (GER)	3	2	4	2	4	3			18
3rd place, bronze medalist(s)	Doreen Vennekamp (GER)	3	5	9	11	15	18			18
4	Nino Salukvadze (GEO)	2	1	3	3					9
4	Nino Salukvadze (GEO)	2	3	6	9					9
