= Shooting at the 2023 European Games – Women's 50 metre rifle three positions =

Women's 50 metre rifle three positions at the 2023 European Games
- Venue: Wrocław Shooting Centre
- Dates: 26 June
- Competitors: 35 from 20 nations

Medalists
gold medal	Jenny Stene	Norway
silver medal	Natalia Kochańska	Poland
bronze medal	Seonaid McIntosh	Great Britain

The women's 50 metre rifle three positions event at the 2023 European Games took place on 26 June at the Wrocław Shooting Centre.

== Records ==
Prior to this competition, the existing world, European and Games records were as follows.

Qualification
World Record	Jenny Stene (NOR)	596	Wrocław, Poland	15 September 2022
European Record	Jenny Stene (NOR)	596	Wrocław, Poland	15 September 2022
Games Record	—	—	—	—

== Results ==
=== Qualification ===
Rank	Athlete	Country	Kneeling		Prone		Standing		Total	Notes
Rank	Athlete	Country	1	2	1	2	1	2	Total	Notes
1	Teodora Vukojević	Serbia	100	99	98	100	98	99	594-35x	Q, GR
2	Seonaid McIntosh	Great Britain	99	97	99	100	98	98	591-38x	Q
3	Jenny Stene	Norway	98	100	99	100	97	96	590-36x	Q
4	Jeanette Hegg Duestad	Norway	100	97	100	100	96	97	590-29x	Q
5	Natalia Kochańska	Poland	100	98	97	98	99	97	589-32x	Q
6	Jolyn Beer	Germany	98	99	100	100	96	95	588-33x	Q
7	Daria Tykhova	Ukraine	96	97	100	99	97	99	588-28x	Q
8	Marta Zeljković	Croatia	96	97	100	100	97	97	587-24x	Q
9	Nina Christen	Switzerland	99	97	100	97	97	96	586-32x	
10	Kamila Novotná	Slovakia	98	99	99	99	96	95	586-28x	
11	Eszter Mészáros	Hungary	96	98	99	100	96	97	586-27x	
12	Sheileen Waibel	Austria	96	99	98	99	97	96	585-33x	
13	Veronika Blažíčková	Czech Republic	96	97	98	100	96	97	584-30x	
14	Lisa Müller	Germany	98	99	99	97	98	93	584-29x	
15	Urška Kuharič	Slovenia	99	99	97	98	96	94	583-28x	
16	Eszter Dénes	Hungary	98	97	99	98	94	96	582-28x	
17	Aneta Brabcová	Czech Republic	97	97	100	100	95	93	582-24x	
18	Judith Gomez	France	99	97	97	98	97	94	582-19x	
19	Sofia Ceccarello	Italy	97	97	98	100	93	96	581-30x	
20	Andrea Arsović	Serbia	95	97	99	100	94	96	581-28x	
21	Tal Engler	Israel	96	98	99	99	92	96	580-28x	
22	Barbara Gambaro	Italy	95	97	98	96	97	97	580-26x	
23	Rikke Ibsen	Denmark	96	97	95	98	95	97	578-30x	
24	Nataliia Kalnysh	Ukraine	97	100	98	100	93	90	578-30x	
25	Nadine Ungerank	Austria	96	99	98	98	94	93	578-29x	
26	Sarina Hitz	Switzerland	94	95	100	98	96	95	578-27x	
27	Katie Gleeson	Great Britain	97	94	100	97	97	93	578-22x	
28	Jade Bordet	France	95	96	99	96	94	97	577-25x	
29	Aneta Stankiewicz	Poland	96	95	97	97	96	96	577-25x	
30	Roxana Sidi	Romania	99	95	94	98	96	95	577-20x	
31	Daniela Pešková	Slovakia	95	95	100	99	96	92	577-17x	
32	Stephanie Grundsøe	Denmark	98	94	98	100	90	96	576-27x	
33	Živa Dvoršak	Slovenia	92	99	96	95	98	95	575-21x	
34	Katrin Smirnova	Estonia	91	95	95	96	99	98	574-25x	
35	Jessie Kaps	Belgium	95	95	99	99	92	94	574-24x	

=== Ranking match ===
Rank	Athlete	Kneeling		Prone		Standing				Total	Notes
Rank	Athlete	1	2	1	2	1	2	3	4	Total	Notes
1	Natalia Kochańska (POL)	51.7	50.8	51.6	52.2	51.6	50.7	51.5	49.9	410.0	QG
2	Jenny Stene (NOR)	51.7	49.6	51.2	53.1	50.8	49.9	51.6	51.7	409.6	QG
3rd place, bronze medalist(s)	Seonaid McIntosh (GBR)	51.2	50.8	51.9	51.7	51.3	50.0	51.3	48.3	406.5	
4	Daria Tykhova (UKR)	50.5	49.8	53.2	51.9	50.8	52.9	47.7	49.5	406.3	
5	Jeanette Hegg Duestad (NOR)	49.4	52.4	52.3	51.7	50.1	51.3	49.5		356.7	
6	Teodora Vukojević (SRB)	51.7	51.6	51.1	50.2	49.7	52.7	49.3		356.3	
7	Jolyn Beer (GER)	52.3	51.4	51.9	51.6	49.1	48.2			304.5	
8	Marta Zeljković (CRO)	49.8	50.3	51.3	52.4	49.5	49.6			302.9	

=== Gold medal match ===
Rank	Athlete	Shot															Total
Rank	Athlete	1	2	3	4	5	6	7	8	9	10	11	12	13	14	15	Total
1st place, gold medalist(s)	Jenny Stene (NOR)	9.9	9.7	10.4	9.9	10.7	10.1	10.3	9.8	9.3	9.7	10.1	9.4	9.8	10.2	10.2	17
2nd place, silver medalist(s)	Natalia Kochańska (POL)	9.4	9.6	10.4	9.7	10.0	10.6	9.8	10.8	10.3	10.7	10.3	10.5	9.5	8.4	9.0	13
