= Doreen Vennekamp =

German sport shooter (born 1995)

Personal information
- Nationality: German
- Born: 5 April 1995 (age 31) Gelnhausen, Germany
- Height: 1.70 m (5 ft 7 in)

Sport
- Country: Germany
- Sport: Shooting
- Events: 10 meter air pistol; 25 meter pistol
- Club: SV Hubertus Hüttengesäß
Medal record
Women's shooting
Representing Germany
World Championships
Gold medal – first place	2022 Cairo	25 m standard pistol mixed team
Gold medal – first place	2023 Baku	25 m pistol
Bronze medal – third place	2018 Changwon	25 m pistol
Bronze medal – third place	2018 Changwon	25 m team pistol
Bronze medal – third place	2022 Cairo	25 m pistol
Bronze medal – third place	2022 Cairo	25 m team pistol
World Cup Final
Gold medal – first place	2021 Wroclaw	25 m pistol
Gold medal – first place	2022 Cairo	25 m pistol
Silver medal – second place	2023 Doha	25 m pistol
Bronze medal – third place	2021 Wroclaw	25m Rapid Fire Pistol Mixed Team
World Cup
Gold medal – first place	2023 Bhopal	25 m pistol
Gold medal – first place	2024 Cairo	25 m pistol
Gold medal – first place	2022 Rio De Janeiro	25 m pistol team
Silver medal – second place	2018 Guadalajara	25 m pistol
Silver medal – second place	2022 Rio De Janeiro	25 m pistol
Silver medal – second place	2023 Cairo	25 m pistol
Silver medal – second place	2023 Bhopal	10 m air pistol
Silver medal – second place	2024 Munich	25 m pistol
Bronze medal – third place	2023 Baku	25 m pistol
Bronze medal – third place	2021 Osijek	25m Rapid Fire Pistol Mixed Team
Bronze medal – third place	2021 Osijek	25 m pistol team
Bronze medal – third place	2022 Rio De Janeiro	10 m air pistol team
Bronze medal – third place	2022 Baku	10 m air pistol team
European Games
Gold medal – first place	2019 Minsk	25 m standard pistol mixed team
Gold medal – first place	2023 Kraków–Małopolska	10 m air pistol team
Bronze medal – third place	2023 Kraków–Małopolska	25 m pistol
Bronze medal – third place	2023 Kraków–Małopolska	25 m pistol team
European Championships
Gold medal – first place	2017 Baku	25 m pistol team
Gold medal – first place	2019 Osijek	10 m pistol team
Gold medal – first place	2019 Bologna	25 m pistol team
Gold medal – first place	2021 Osijek	25 m pistol team
Gold medal – first place	2022 Wrocław	25 m pistol
Gold medal – first place	2022 Wrocław	25 m pistol team
Silver medal – second place	2025 Osijek	10 m air pistol team
Bronze medal – third place	2024 Győr	10 m air pistol mixed team

Doreen Vennekamp (born 5 April 1995) is a German sport shooter and World Champion.

She participated at the 2018 ISSF World Shooting Championships, winning a medal. At the 2022 European Championships, she won the 25m Pistol Women's team title with Monika Karsch and Michelle Skeries. At the 2023 ISSF World Shooting Championships she became women's World Champion in the 25meter pistol event. She was voted ISSF Female Athlete of the Year for 2023.

== Records ==
Current world records held in 25 metre pistol
Women (CISM)	Individual	590	Li Duihong (CHN); Maria Grozdeva (BUL); Stephanie Thurmann (GER); Zhang Mengyuan (CHN); Doreen Vennekamp (GER)	1993; 1996; 2015; June 2, 2018; June 2, 2018	(NOR) (SWE) (KOR); Thun (SUI); Thun (SUI)
