= Shooting at the 2023 European Games – Women's team 25 metre pistol =

Women's team 25 metre pistol at the 2023 European Games
- Venue: Wrocław Shooting Centre
- Dates: 28 June
- Competitors: 24 from 8 nations
- Teams: 8

Medalists
gold medal	Yuliya Korostylova; Olena Kostevych; Anastasiia Nimets	Ukraine
silver medal	Julita Borek; Klaudia Breś; Joanna Wawrzonowska	Poland
bronze medal	Sandra Reitz; Michelle Skeries; Doreen Vennekamp	Germany

The women's team 25 metre pistol event at the 2023 European Games took place on 28 June at the Wrocław Shooting Centre.

== Records ==
Prior to this competition, the existing world, European and Games records were as follows.

Qualification
World Record	—	—	—	—
European Record	Germany; Monika Karsch; Sandra Reitz; Doreen Vennekamp	880	Rio de Janeiro, Brazil	16 April 2022
Games Record	—	—	—	—

== Results ==
=== Qualification 1 ===
Rank	Country	Athlete	Part	Series			Total	Team total	Notes
Rank	Country	Athlete	Part	1	2	3	Total	Team total	Notes
1	Ukraine	Olena Kostevych	Precision	49	49	50	295-11x	877-35x	Q, GR
1	Ukraine	Olena Kostevych	Rapid	49	50	48	295-11x	877-35x	Q, GR
1	Ukraine	Yuliya Korostylova	Precision	50	46	48	291-14x	877-35x	Q, GR
1	Ukraine	Yuliya Korostylova	Rapid	49	49	49	291-14x	877-35x	Q, GR
1	Ukraine	Anastasiia Nimets	Precision	46	48	50	291-10x	877-35x	Q, GR
1	Ukraine	Anastasiia Nimets	Rapid	49	49	49	291-10x	877-35x	Q, GR
2	Germany	Doreen Vennekamp	Precision	47	48	49	292-9x	873-32x	Q
2	Germany	Doreen Vennekamp	Rapid	50	49	49	292-9x	873-32x	Q
2	Germany	Michelle Skeries	Precision	48	48	48	291-14x	873-32x	Q
2	Germany	Michelle Skeries	Rapid	48	49	50	291-14x	873-32x	Q
2	Germany	Sandra Reitz	Precision	49	48	47	290-9x	873-32x	Q
2	Germany	Sandra Reitz	Rapid	48	49	49	290-9x	873-32x	Q
3	France	Camille Jedrzejewski	Precision	49	48	50	295-17x	867-33x	Q
3	France	Camille Jedrzejewski	Rapid	49	49	50	295-17x	867-33x	Q
3	France	Mathilde Lamolle	Precision	49	46	48	291-9x	867-33x	Q
3	France	Mathilde Lamolle	Rapid	50	48	50	291-9x	867-33x	Q
3	France	Héloïse Fourré	Precision	48	46	45	281-7x	867-33x	Q
3	France	Héloïse Fourré	Rapid	48	46	48	281-7x	867-33x	Q
4	Czech Republic	Veronika Schejbalová	Precision	47	50	48	291-10x	866-28x	Q
4	Czech Republic	Veronika Schejbalová	Rapid	47	50	49	291-10x	866-28x	Q
4	Czech Republic	Alžběta Dědová	Precision	50	47	45	289-10x	866-28x	Q
4	Czech Republic	Alžběta Dědová	Rapid	49	49	49	289-10x	866-28x	Q
4	Czech Republic	Anna Miřejovská	Precision	49	47	47	286-8x	866-28x	Q
4	Czech Republic	Anna Miřejovská	Rapid	46	48	49	286-8x	866-28x	Q
5	Italy	Maria Varricchio	Precision	48	47	49	291-10x	862-22x	Q
5	Italy	Maria Varricchio	Rapid	49	50	48	291-10x	862-22x	Q
5	Italy	Chiara Giancamilli	Precision	46	46	49	289-8x	862-22x	Q
5	Italy	Chiara Giancamilli	Rapid	49	49	50	289-8x	862-22x	Q
5	Italy	Sara Costantino	Precision	46	48	49	282-4x	862-22x	Q
5	Italy	Sara Costantino	Rapid	47	44	48	282-4x	862-22x	Q
6	Hungary	Renáta Sike	Precision	46	49	48	289-10x	861-29x	Q
6	Hungary	Renáta Sike	Rapid	48	50	48	289-10x	861-29x	Q
6	Hungary	Veronika Major	Precision	47	47	47	287-10x	861-29x	Q
6	Hungary	Veronika Major	Rapid	50	48	48	287-10x	861-29x	Q
6	Hungary	Miriam Jákó	Precision	48	46	48	285-9x	861-29x	Q
6	Hungary	Miriam Jákó	Rapid	46	49	48	285-9x	861-29x	Q
7	Poland	Joanna Wawrzonowska	Precision	49	44	50	292-10x	856-20x	Q
7	Poland	Joanna Wawrzonowska	Rapid	50	50	49	292-10x	856-20x	Q
7	Poland	Julita Borek	Precision	48	45	47	283-4x	856-20x	Q
7	Poland	Julita Borek	Rapid	47	49	47	283-4x	856-20x	Q
7	Poland	Klaudia Breś	Precision	49	49	48	281-6x	856-20x	Q
7	Poland	Klaudia Breś	Rapid	48	49	38	281-6x	856-20x	Q
8	Slovenia	Denis Bola Ujčič	Precision	49	47	46	288-8x	843-15x	Q
8	Slovenia	Denis Bola Ujčič	Rapid	49	49	48	288-8x	843-15x	Q
8	Slovenia	Jagoda Tkalec	Precision	49	45	49	288-6x	843-15x	Q
8	Slovenia	Jagoda Tkalec	Rapid	49	49	47	288-6x	843-15x	Q
8	Slovenia	Sonja Benčina	Precision	46	46	48	267-1x	843-15x	Q
8	Slovenia	Sonja Benčina	Rapid	33	45	49	267-1x	843-15x	Q

=== Qualification 2 ===
Rank	Country	Athlete	Series			Total	Team total	Notes
Rank	Country	Athlete	1	2	3	Total	Team total	Notes
1	Ukraine	Yuliya Korostylova	50	49	48	147-7x	439-18x	QG
1	Ukraine	Anastasiia Nimets	49	48	50	147-5x	439-18x	QG
1	Ukraine	Olena Kostevych	49	49	47	145-6x	439-18x	QG
2	Poland	Klaudia Breś	50	50	50	150-7x	438-13x	QG
2	Poland	Joanna Wawrzonowska	49	47	49	145-5x	438-13x	QG
2	Poland	Julita Borek	48	47	48	143-1x	438-13x	QG
3	Hungary	Veronika Major	50	50	49	149-10x	437-18x	QB
3	Hungary	Miriam Jákó	47	50	48	145-4x	437-18x	QB
3	Hungary	Renáta Sike	46	48	49	143-4x	437-18x	QB
4	Germany	Doreen Vennekamp	49	47	50	146-7x	435-14x	QB
4	Germany	Michelle Skeries	49	49	47	145-3x	435-14x	QB
4	Germany	Sandra Reitz	50	48	46	144-4x	435-14x	QB
5	France	Camille Jedrzejewski	50	48	49	147-7x	435-13x	
5	France	Mathilde Lamolle	49	49	46	144-4x	435-13x	
5	France	Héloïse Fourré	48	47	49	144-2x	435-13x	
6	Slovenia	Denis Bola Ujčič	50	48	49	147-4x	428-9x	
6	Slovenia	Jagoda Tkalec	48	47	46	141-3x	428-9x	
6	Slovenia	Sonja Benčina	49	47	44	140-2x	428-9x	
7	Czech Republic	Anna Miřejovská	48	49	48	145-3x	425-4x	
7	Czech Republic	Alžběta Dědová	46	46	49	141-1x	425-4x	
7	Czech Republic	Veronika Schejbalová	44	47	48	139-0x	425-4x	
8	Italy	Maria Varricchio	48	48	47	143-4x	419-8x	
8	Italy	Chiara Giancamilli	46	47	47	140-2x	419-8x	
8	Italy	Sara Costantino	47	41	48	136-2x	419-8x	

=== Finals ===
Rank	Country	Athletes	Total
Gold medal match
1st place, gold medalist(s)	Ukraine	Yuliya Korostylova; Olena Kostevych; Anastasiia Nimets	16
2nd place, silver medalist(s)	Poland	Julita Borek; Klaudia Breś; Joanna Wawrzonowska	10
Bronze medal match
3rd place, bronze medalist(s)	Germany	Sandra Reitz; Michelle Skeries; Doreen Vennekamp	16
4	Hungary	Miriam Jákó; Veronika Major; Renáta Sike	12
