= Muaythai at the 2023 European Games – Men's 91 kg =

Muaythai competition

Men's 91 kg at the 2023 European Games
- Venue: Myślenice Arena
- Date: 25–28 June
- Competitors: 8 from 8 nations

Medalists
gold medal	Oleh Pryimachov	Ukraine
silver medal	Enrico Pellegrino Pellegri	Italy
bronze medal	Jakub Klauda	Czech Republic
bronze medal	Kyriakos Bakirtzis	Greece

Men's 91 kg competition at the Muaythai at the 2023 European Games in Kraków, Poland, took place on 25–28 June at the Myślenice Arena.

== Results ==
Quarterfinals
Luiz Carlos Moraes Fortes (POR)
Enrico Pellegrino Pellegri (ITA)	KOH R3
Łukasz Radosz (POL)	27
Jakub Klauda (CZE)	30
Slava Margishvili (GEO)
Kyriakos Bakirtzis (GRE)	KOB R2
Toni Ćatipović (CRO)	26
Oleh Pryimachov (UKR)	30

Semifinals
Enrico Pellegrino Pellegri (ITA)	29
Jakub Klauda (CZE)	28
Kyriakos Bakirtzis (GRE)	28
Oleh Pryimachov (UKR)	29

Final
Enrico Pellegrino Pellegri (ITA)	27
Oleh Pryimachov (UKR)	30
