= Darya Varfolomeyeva =

Ukrainian fencer (born 1999)

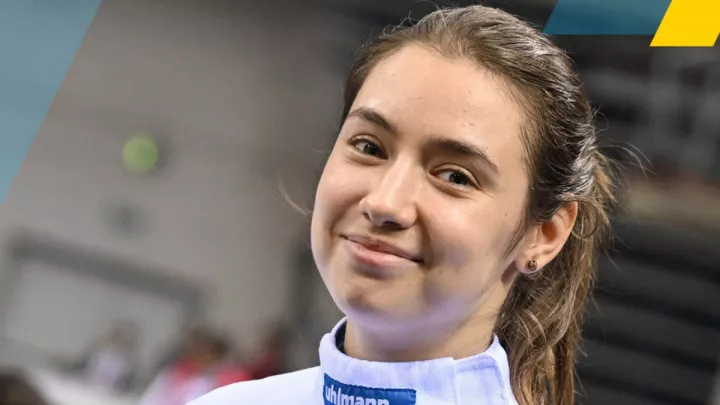

Personal information
- Born: 13 April 1999 (age 27) Kyiv, Ukraine

Fencing career
- Sport: Fencing
- Country: Ukraine
- Weapon: épée
- Hand: right
- National coach: D. Petrus, Natalia Konrad
- FIE ranking: ranking

Darya Varfolomeyeva (Ukrainian: Дар'я Варфоломеєва; born 13 April 1999 in Kyiv, Ukraine) is a Ukrainian épée fencer. She was selected to compete in the team event at the 2024 Summer Olympics.

== Sporting career ==
Varfolomeyeva competed at the 2023 European Games where she lost to Aleyna Erturk from Turkey in the round of 32.

== Personal life ==
Varfolomeyeva graduated from National University of Ukraine on Physical Education and Sport.
