= Michelle Skeries =

German sport shooter (born 1996)

Personal information
- Nationality: German
- Born: 2 April 1996 (age 30)
- Height: 1.64 m (5 ft 5 in)

Sport
- Country: Germany
- Sport: Shooting
- Event: Air pistol
- Club: SGi Frankfurt/Oder
Medal record
Women's shooting
Representing Germany
World Championships
Bronze medal – third place	2018 Changwon	25 m pistol team
European Games
Bronze medal – third place	2023 Kraków-Małopolska	25 m pistol team
European Championships
Gold medal – first place	2017 Baku	25 m pistol team
Gold medal – first place	2019 Bologna	25 m pistol team
Gold medal – first place	2022 Wrocław	25 m pistol team

Michelle Skeries (born 2 April 1996) is a German sport shooter.

She participated at the 2018 ISSF World Shooting Championships, winning a medal.

At the 2022 European Championships, she won the 25m Pistol Women's team title with Doreen Vennekamp and Monika Karsch.
