= Daria Tykhova =

Ukrainian sport shooter (born 1986)

Personal information
- Born: 15 February 1986 (age 40) Kherson, Ukrainian SSR, Soviet Union

Sport
- Sport: Sports shooting
Medal record
Women's shooting
Representing Ukraine
World Championships
Silver medal – second place	2022 Cairo	50 m rifle prone mixed team
European Championships
Bronze medal – third place	2011 Brescia	10 m rifle
Bronze medal – third place	2022 Wrocław	50 m rifle 3 positions

Daria Tykhova (born 15 February 1986) is a Ukrainian sports shooter. She competed at the 2008 and 2012 Summer Olympics. She is a two-time European Championships medallist. At the 2022 World Championships, she won together with Serhiy Kulish a silver medal in mixed team 50 m rifle prone.
