= Anastasiia Nimets =

Ukrainian sport shooter (born 1993)

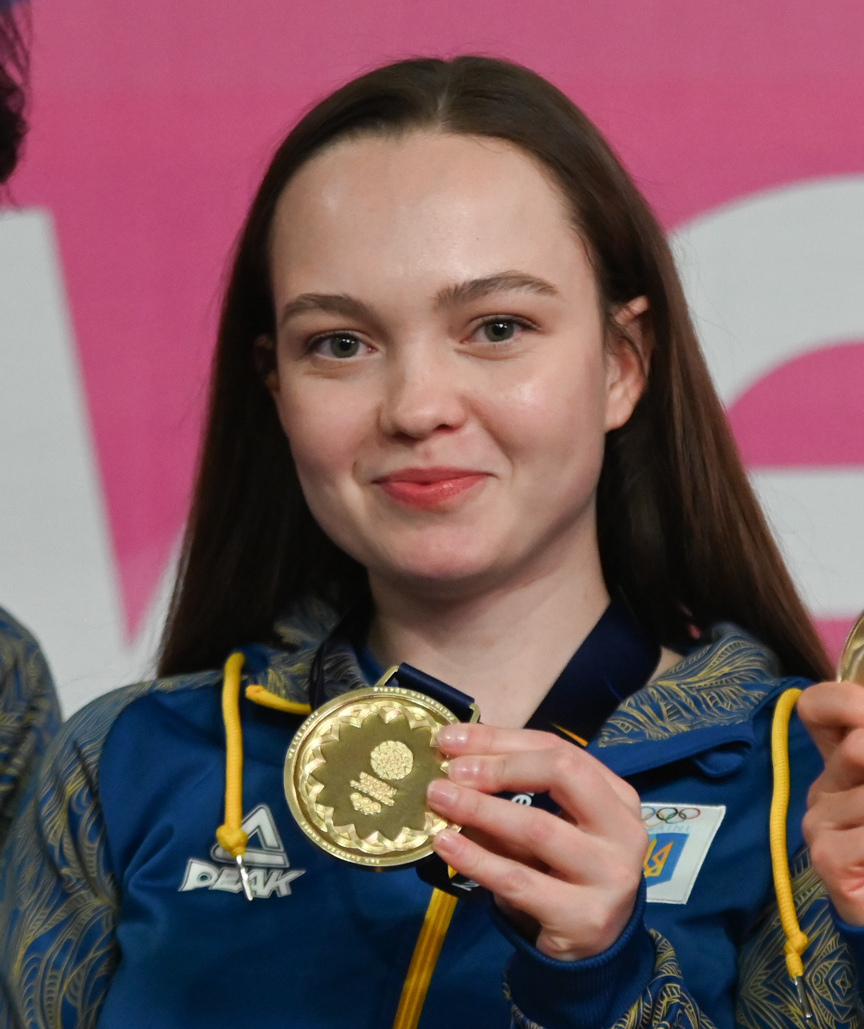
- Anastasiia Nimets at the 2023 European Games.

Personal information
- Nationality: Ukraine
- Born: 6 July 1993 (age 32) Lviv, Ukraine

Sport
- Sport: Shooting
- Event(s): 10 m air pistol (AP40); 25 m pistol (SP)
- Club: Dynamo Lviv
- Coached by: Roman Bondaruk
Medal record
Women's shooting
Representing Ukraine
European Games
Gold medal – first place	2023 Kraków-Małopolska	25 m pistol team
European Championships
Gold medal – first place	2022 Wrocław	25 m rapid fire pistol mixed team
Silver medal – second place	2021 Osijek	25 m rapid fire pistol mixed team
Silver medal – second place	2022 Wrocław	25 m pistol team
Silver medal – second place	2024 Osijek	25 m rapid fire pistol mixed duet

Anastasiia Nimets (Ukrainian: Анастасія Німець; born 6 July 1993 in Lviv) is a Ukrainian sport shooter.

== Career ==
Nimets reached leading positions in the national team in 2021. In a pair with Volodymyr Pasternak, she won her first international medal at the 2021 European Championships. Since then she regularly appeared in the roster of the Ukraine national team.

In 2022, Nimets reached her first World Cup podium when she finished third in the 25 m pistol event in Baku behind Antoaneta Kostadinova from Bulgaria and Veronika Major from Hungary. She had also some successes in team and mixed duet events. In 2023, Nimets reached silver position at the World Cup event in Lima behind China's Feng Sixuan.

== Personal life ==
Nimets graduated from Lviv State University of Physical Culture.
