= Shooting at the 2022 Asian Games – Women's 50 metre rifle three positions team =

Women's 50 metre rifle 3 positions team at the 2022 Asian Games
- Venue: Fuyang Yinhu Sports Centre
- Dates: 27 September 2023
- Competitors: 39 from 13 nations

Medalists
gold medal	China; Han Jiayu, Xia Siyu, Zhang Qiongyue
silver medal	India; Ashi Chouksey, Manini Kaushik, Sift Kaur Samra
bronze medal	South Korea; Bae Sang-hee, Lee Eun-seo, Lee Kye-rim

The women's 50 metre rifle three positions team competition at the 2022 Asian Games in Hangzhou, China was held on 27 September 2023 at the Fuyang Yinhu Sports Centre.

== Schedule ==
All times are China Standard Time (UTC+08:00)

Date	Time	Event
Wednesday, 27 September 2023	09:00	Final

== Records ==
Prior to this competition, the existing world, Asian and Games records were as follows.

World Record	United States	1774	Baku, Azerbaijan	21 August 2023
Asian Record	China	1773	Baku, Azerbaijan	21 August 2023
Games Record	—	—	—	—

== Results ==
Legend

- DNS — Did not start

Rank	Team	Kneeling		Prone		Standing		Total	Xs	Notes
Rank	Team	1	2	1	2	1	2	Total	Xs	Notes
1st place, gold medalist(s)	China (CHN)	298	295	299	298	293	290	1773	98	GR
	Han Jiayu	99	96	99	99	97	98	588	27	
	Xia Siyu	100	100	100	100	98	96	594	41	
	Zhang Qiongyue	99	99	100	99	98	96	591	30	
2nd place, silver medalist(s)	India (IND)	292	290	297	300	292	293	1764	83	
	Ashi Chouksey	98	97	99	100	99	97	590	27	
	Manini Kaushik	95	95	98	100	95	97	580	28	
	Sift Kaur Samra	99	98	100	100	98	99	594	28	
3rd place, bronze medalist(s)	South Korea (KOR)	294	293	297	295	291	286	1756	78	
	Bae Sang-hee	97	97	99	98	99	96	586	24	
	Lee Eun-seo	99	100	99	98	98	96	590	29	
	Lee Kye-rim	98	96	99	99	94	94	580	25	
4	Kazakhstan (KAZ)	291	296	295	293	289	286	1750	88	
	Arina Altukhova	97	100	99	99	96	92	583	31	
	Yelizaveta Bezrukova	99	99	98	97	95	97	585	28	
	Alexandra Le	95	97	98	97	98	97	582	29	
5	Japan (JPN)	287	289	295	295	286	290	1742	82	
	Shiori Hirata	99	100	100	98	98	95	590	33	
	Yasuyo Matsumoto	96	95	97	98	93	97	576	26	
	Haruka Nakaguchi	92	94	98	99	95	98	576	23	
6	Iran (IRI)	289	287	292	297	291	286	1742	75	
	Elaheh Ahmadi	94	96	96	99	98	92	575	23	
	Najmeh Khedmati	99	93	98	98	97	97	582	27	
	Armina Sadeghian	96	98	98	100	96	97	585	25	
7	Mongolia (MGL)	293	286	293	295	287	285	1739	70	
	Chuluunbadrakhyn Narantuyaa	97	93	98	98	94	93	573	18	
	Olzvoibaataryn Yanjinlkham	97	97	96	98	96	94	578	22	
	Oyuunbatyn Yesügen	99	96	99	99	97	98	588	30	
8	Singapore (SGP)	279	291	295	297	286	290	1738	68	
	Jasmine Ser	95	96	98	100	95	95	579	26	
	Adele Tan	92	98	98	98	95	96	577	18	
	Martina Veloso	92	97	99	99	96	99	582	24	
9	Indonesia (INA)	285	287	297	296	283	285	1733	74	
	Monica Daryanti	96	94	99	99	93	98	579	28	
	Audrey Zahra Dhiyaanisa	97	98	99	98	97	95	584	28	
	Vidya Rafika Toyyiba	92	95	99	99	93	92	570	18	
10	Thailand (THA)	288	291	292	289	278	289	1727	62	
	Sirijit Khongnil	96	98	95	96	93	95	573	19	
	Jayden Mohprasit	97	98	98	95	94	97	579	22	
	Ratchadaporn Plengsaengthong	95	95	99	98	91	97	575	21	
11	Bahrain (BRN)	283	283	286	294	279	278	1703	46	
	Safa Al-Doseri	98	94	97	99	91	93	572	19	
	Sara Al-Doseri	94	94	93	96	95	91	563	13	
	Fawzia Mohamed	91	95	96	99	93	94	568	14	
12	Bangladesh (BAN)	277	278	278	288	271	277	1669	34	
	Shaira Arefin	91	93	90	99	93	94	560	10	
	Kamrun Nahar Koly	96	95	94	94	94	94	567	17	
	Nusrat Jahan Shamsi	90	90	94	95	84	89	542	7	
—	Qatar (QAT)							DNS		
	Matara Al-Aseiri	92	95	96	96	91	92	562	14	
	Shahd Al-Darwish							DNS		
	Aisha Al-Mahmoud							DNS		
