= Shooting at the 2022 Asian Games – Women's 50 metre rifle three positions =

Women's 50 metre rifle 3 positions at the 2022 Asian Games
- Venue: Fuyang Yinhu Sports Centre
- Dates: 27 September 2023
- Competitors: 46 from 18 nations

Medalists
gold medal	Sift Kaur Samra	India
silver medal	Zhang Qiongyue	China
bronze medal	Ashi Chouksey	India

The women's 50 metre rifle three positions competition at the 2022 Asian Games in Hangzhou, China, was held on 27 September 2023 at Fuyang Yinhu Sports Centre. Sift Kaur Samra of India won the gold medal setting a new world record in the process.

== Schedule ==
All times are China Standard Time (UTC+08:00)

Date	Time	Event
Wednesday, 27 September 2023	09:00	Qualification
Wednesday, 27 September 2023	12:00	Final

== Records ==
Prior to this competition, the existing world, Asian and Games records were as follows.

Qualification
World Record	Jenny Stene (NOR)	596	Wrocław, Poland	15 September 2022
Asian Record	Zhang Qiongyue (CHN)	595	Baku, Azerbaijan	21 August 2023
Games Record	—	—	—	—
Final
World Record	Seonaid McIntosh (GBR)	467.0	Baku, Azerbaijan	14 May 2023
Asian Record	Chang Jing (CHN)	463.3	Fort Benning, United States	17 May 2015
Games Record	Gankhuyagiin Nandinzayaa (MGL)	458.8	Palembang, Indonesia	22 August 2018

== Results ==
Legend

- DNS — Did not start

=== Qualification ===
Rank	Athlete	Kneeling		Prone		Standing		Total	Xs	Notes
Rank	Athlete	1	2	1	2	1	2	Total	Xs	Notes
1	Xia Siyu (CHN)	100	100	100	100	98	96	594	41	GR
2	Sift Kaur Samra (IND)	99	98	100	100	98	99	594	28	GR
3	Zhang Qiongyue (CHN)	99	99	100	99	98	96	591	30	
4	Shiori Hirata (JPN)	99	100	100	98	98	95	590	33	
5	Lee Eun-seo (KOR)	99	100	99	98	98	96	590	29	
6	Ashi Chouksey (IND)	98	97	99	100	99	97	590	27	
7	Oyuunbatyn Yesügen (MGL)	99	96	99	99	97	98	588	30	
8	Han Jiayu (CHN)	99	96	99	99	97	98	588	27	
9	Bae Sang-hee (KOR)	97	97	99	98	99	96	586	24	
10	Yelizaveta Bezrukova (KAZ)	99	99	98	97	95	97	585	28	
11	Armina Sadeghian (IRI)	96	98	98	100	96	97	585	25	
12	Audrey Zahra Dhiyaanisa (INA)	97	98	99	98	97	95	584	28	
13	Arina Altukhova (KAZ)	97	100	99	99	96	92	583	31	
14	Alexandra Le (KAZ)	95	97	98	97	98	97	582	29	
15	Najmeh Khedmati (IRI)	99	93	98	98	97	97	582	27	
16	Martina Veloso (SGP)	92	97	99	99	96	99	582	24	
17	Alia Husna Budruddin (MAS)	96	98	100	98	96	93	581	26	
18	Manini Kaushik (IND)	95	95	98	100	95	97	580	28	
19	Lee Kye-rim (KOR)	98	96	99	99	94	94	580	25	
20	Monica Daryanti (INA)	96	94	99	99	93	98	579	28	
21	Jasmine Ser (SGP)	95	96	98	100	95	95	579	26	
22	Jayden Mohprasit (THA)	97	98	98	95	94	97	579	22	
23	Amparo Acuña (PHI)	97	96	98	99	93	95	578	25	
24	Olzvoibaataryn Yanjinlkham (MGL)	97	97	96	98	96	94	578	22	
25	Adele Tan (SGP)	92	98	98	98	95	96	577	18	
26	Yasuyo Matsumoto (JPN)	96	95	97	98	93	97	576	26	
27	Haruka Nakaguchi (JPN)	92	94	98	99	95	98	576	23	
28	Amina Al-Tarshi (OMA)	99	94	96	98	93	95	575	26	
29	Elaheh Ahmadi (IRI)	94	96	96	99	98	92	575	23	
30	Ratchadaporn Plengsaengthong (THA)	95	95	99	98	91	97	575	21	
31	Sirijit Khongnil (THA)	96	98	95	96	93	95	573	19	
32	Chuluunbadrakhyn Narantuyaa (MGL)	97	93	98	98	94	93	573	18	
33	Safa Al-Doseri (BRN)	98	94	97	99	91	93	572	19	
34	Nur Suryani Taibi (MAS)	96	96	97	98	90	95	572	16	
35	Vidya Rafika Toyyiba (INA)	92	95	99	99	93	92	570	18	
36	Siham Al-Hasani (OMA)	90	99	97	99	90	95	570	17	
37	Phí Thanh Thảo (VIE)	95	93	95	94	97	95	569	14	
38	Fawzia Mohamed (BRN)	91	95	96	99	93	94	568	14	
39	Kamrun Nahar Koly (BAN)	96	95	94	94	94	94	567	17	
40	Sara Al-Doseri (BRN)	94	94	93	96	95	91	563	13	
41	Sung Yu-ting (TPE)	92	94	97	94	92	94	563	9	
42	Matara Al-Aseiri (QAT)	92	95	96	96	91	92	562	14	
43	Shaira Arefin (BAN)	91	93	90	99	93	94	560	10	
44	Nusrat Jahan Shamsi (BAN)	90	90	94	95	84	89	542	7	
—	Shahd Al-Darwish (QAT)							DNS		
—	Aisha Al-Mahmoud (QAT)							DNS		

=== Final ===
Rank	Athlete	Kneeling			Prone			Standing – Elimination							S-off	Notes
Rank	Athlete	1	2	3	1	2	3	1	2	3	4	5	6	7	S-off	Notes
1st place, gold medalist(s)	Sift Kaur Samra (IND)	50.4	102.1	154.6	207.2	260.1	312.5	365.0	417.2	427.9	437.8	448.6	459.4	469.6		WR
2nd place, silver medalist(s)	Zhang Qiongyue (CHN)	49.9	101.9	154.5	206.9	259.0	309.7	360.5	412.5	422.4	431.5	441.9	452.4	462.3		
3rd place, bronze medalist(s)	Ashi Chouksey (IND)	50.6	100.2	152.5	205.5	258.5	311.6	362.2	412.3	422.2	432.7	443.0	451.9			
4	Lee Eun-seo (KOR)	50.6	102.3	153.6	206.2	256.6	308.9	359.8	410.7	420.8	430.6	440.8				
5	Oyuunbatyn Yesügen (MGL)	50.7	102.0	152.7	205.3	256.5	308.4	357.7	407.7	417.6	427.5					
6	Shiori Hirata (JPN)	51.3	102.2	153.9	204.8	255.8	306.9	356.2	405.5	415.6						
7	Xia Siyu (CHN)	50.3	102.0	152.4	203.7	254.5	305.9	354.7	405.0							
8	Bae Sang-hee (KOR)	46.0	94.6	144.2	197.1	248.4	300.7	350.9	400.7							
