= Shooting at the 2026 Asian Games – Women's 50 metre rifle three positions =

Women's 50 metre rifle 3 positions at the 2026 Asian Games
- Venue: Aichi Pref. General Shooting Gallery
- Dates: 26 September 2026
- Competitors: 45 from 16 nations

Medalists
gold medal	Han Jiayu	China
silver medal	Zhang Liyuan	China
bronze medal	Kim Ji-eun	South Korea

The women's 50 metre rifle three positions competition at the 2026 Asian Games in Aichi Prefecture, Japan, was held on 26 September 2026 at Aichi Pref. General Shooting Gallery. Han Jiayu of China won the gold medal with a score of 359.0, while Zhang Liyuan won silver and Kim Jieun won bronze.

== Schedule ==
All times are Japan Standard Time (UTC+09:00)

Date	Time	Event
Saturday, 26 September 2026	09:45	Qualification
Saturday, 26 September 2026	13:00	Final

== Records ==
Prior to this competition, the existing world, Asian and Games records were as follows.

Qualification
World Record	Jenny Stene (NOR)	596	Wrocław, Poland	15 September 2022
Asian Record	Xia Siyu (CHN)	594	Hangzhou, China	27 September 2023
Games Record	Xia Siyu (CHN)	594	Hangzhou, China	27 September 2023
Final
World Record	Nele Stark (GER)	363.3	Osijek, Croatia	8 May 2026
Asian Record	Sofiya Shulzhenko (KAZ)	358.2	New Delhi, India	10 February 2026
Games Record	—	—	—	—

== Results ==
Legend

- Q — Qualified for final
- DNS — Did not start
- QAsR — Qualification Asian Record
- QGR — Qualification Asian Games Record
- x — Inner tens

=== Qualification ===
Rank	Athlete	Kneeling		Prone		Standing		Total	Xs	Notes
Rank	Athlete	1	2	1	2	1	2	Total	Xs	Notes
1	Han Jiayu (CHN)	98	100	100	99	98	99	594	33	Q GR
2	Zhang Liyuan (CHN)	98	97	99	100	97	100	591	38	Q
3	Tilottama Sen (IND)	98	99	98	100	97	98	590	32	Q
4	Wang Zifei (CHN)	99	98	100	97	98	96	588	34	
5	Nobata Misaki (JPN)	99	96	99	100	97	97	588	32	Q
6	Vidarsa Vinod (IND)	97	96	100	99	98	98	588	29	Q
7	Kim Ji-eun (KOR)	96	100	99	99	96	98	588	28	Q
8	Gan Chen Jie (MAS)	99	99	99	97	96	97	587	37	Q
9	Arina Malinovskaya (KAZ)	99	97	100	99	95	97	587	32	Q
10	Najmeh Khedmati (IRI)	98	98	97	100	100	94	587	28	
11	Ratchadaporn Plengsaengthong (THA)	96	99	97	100	96	99	587	24	
12	Audrey Zahra Dhiyaanisa (INA)	95	99	99	99	98	97	587	18	
13	Oyuunbatyn Yesügen (MGL)	97	97	97	100	97	98	586	30	
14	Sofiya Shulzhenko (KAZ)	98	98	98	98	94	99	585	31	
15	Ashi Chouksey (IND)	98	98	100	99	93	97	585	29	
16	Le Thi Mong Tuyen (VIE)	97	98	99	98	98	95	585	20	
17	Aruuke Talantbekova (KGZ)	98	96	98	98	97	97	584	24	
18	Shermineh Chehel Amirani (IRI)	98	97	98	98	95	97	583	31	
19	Alia Husna Binti Budruddin (MAS)	96	97	98	98	96	98	583	27	
20	Vidya Rafika Rahmatan Toyyiba (INA)	93	98	98	100	97	97	583	24	
21	Taichi Hinata (JPN)	97	95	98	98	97	98	583	23	
22	Yelizaveta Bezrukova (KAZ)	98	97	97	99	95	96	582	26	
23	Duong Ha My (VIE)	94	98	100	99	95	96	582	23	
24	Chen Chi (TPE)	97	98	99	97	97	94	582	22	
25	Kim Bo-kyung (KOR)	98	97	99	98	96	93	581	30	
26	Gankhuyag Nandinzaya (MGL)	96	95	98	99	97	96	581	26	
27	Ai Horinouchi (JPN)	97	98	99	96	95	96	581	26	
28	Mukhtasar Tokhirova (UZB)	98	94	97	100	97	95	581	22	
29	Oh Se-hee (KOR)	94	96	97	99	97	97	580	25	
30	Fatemeh Amini Pozveh (IRI)	92	96	100	98	97	96	579	28	
31	Amparo Teresa Acuna (PHI)	97	97	99	100	94	92	579	25	
32	Thanyalak Chotphibunsin (THA)	96	95	96	100	93	96	576	25	
33	Nur Suryani Taibi (MAS)	96	96	98	100	93	93	576	22	
34	Jayden Jitrawee Mohprasit (THA)	99	98	97	97	95	89	575	24	
35	Malika Lagutenko (TJK)	95	95	100	98	94	93	575	16	
36	Sayeda Atkia Hasan (BAN)	97	93	97	97	94	96	574	22	
37	Olzvoibaataryn Yanjinlkham (MGL)	98	94	98	96	93	95	574	20	
38	Citra Dewi Resti (INA)	96	95	99	99	92	93	574	19	
39	Phí Thanh Thảo (VIE)	98	93	97	100	93	93	574	18	
40	Anora Lagutenko (TJK)	94	95	96	97	91	95	568	19	
41	Sung Yu-Ting (TPE)	94	92	96	93	97	95	567	23	
42	Al Anoud Abdullah Hamed Al Khalili (OMA)	93	90	94	97	98	95	567	14	
43	Amina Al Tarshi (OMA)	95	93	96	94	92	91	561	18	
44	Almaha Mishal A B Al-Ali (QAT)	96	92	98	92	91	92	561	17	
45	Sajida Haque (BAN)	94	93	93	96	93	92	561	12	

=== Final ===
Rank	Athlete	Kneeling			Prone			Standing – Elimination				S-off	Notes
Rank	Athlete	1	2	3	1	2	3	1	2	3	4	S-off	Notes
1st place, gold medalist(s)	Han Jiayu (CHN)	50.7	104.7	154.9	205.4	308.4	318.9	329.5	339.0	348.5	359.0		GR
2nd place, silver medalist(s)	Zhang Liyuan (CHN)	50.8	103.5	154.3	206.5	308.2	317.8	328.5	338.8	348.7	358.8		
3rd place, bronze medalist(s)	Kim Ji-eun (KOR)	50.0	103.3	154.3	206.3	307.6	318.1	327.6	338.1	348.4			
4	Tilottama Sen (IND)	51.7	102.4	153.5	205.9	307.8	317.5	327.9	337.3				
5	Vidarsa Vinod (IND)	50.7	102.1	153.1	205.3	307.0	317.4	327.4					
6	Arina Malinovskaya (KAZ)	50.2	103.4	153.0	206.2	306.6	316.7						
7	Nobata Misaki (JPN)	50.8	102.9	153.7	206.0	306.5							
8	Gan Chen Jie (MAS)	48.8	98.9	151.2	201.2	299.1							
