= Shooting at the 2026 Asian Games – Women's 10 metre air rifle =

Women's 10 metre air rifle at the 2026 Asian Games
- Venue: Aichi Prefectural Shooting Range
- Dates: 20 September 2026

Medalists
gold medal	Hinata Taichi	Japan
silver medal	Elavenil Valarivan	India
bronze medal	Ban Hyojin	South Korea

The women's 10 metre air rifle competition at the 2026 Asian Games in Nagoya, Japan was held on 20 September 2026 at the Aichi Prefectural Shooting Range. Hinata Taichi of Japan won the gold medal, setting a new Asian Games record in the final.

== Schedule ==
All times are Japan Standard Time (UTC+09:00)

Date	Time	Event
Sunday, 20 September 2026	09:45	Qualification
Sunday, 20 September 2026	14:30	Final

== Records ==
Prior to this competition, the existing world, Asian and Games records were as follows.

Qualification
World Record	Alison Weisz (USA)	635.3	Lima, Peru	8 November 2022
Asian Record	Han Jiayu (CHN)	634.1	Hangzhou, China	24 September 2023
Games Record	Han Jiayu (CHN)	634.1	Hangzhou, China	24 September 2023
Final
World Record	Han Jiayu (CHN)	254.0	Baku, Azerbaijan	12 May 2023
Asian Record	Han Jiayu (CHN)	254.0	Baku, Azerbaijan	12 May 2023
Games Record	Huang Yuting (CHN)	252.7	Hangzhou, China	20 September 2023

== Results ==
Legend

- DNS — Did not start
- DSQ — Disqualified

=== Qualification ===
Rank	Athlete	Series						Total	Notes
Rank	Athlete	1	2	3	4	5	6	Total	Notes
1	Wang Zifei (CHN)	106.2	106.1	106.0	106.9	105.7	105.9	636.8	Q, QGR, QAsR
2	Ban Hyo-jin (KOR)	105.6	105.3	106.1	106.1	105.6	106.2	634.9	Q
3	Sonam Uttam Maskar (IND)	105.6	105.6	106.6	105.3	105.4	105.6	634.1	Q
4	Hinata Taichi (JPN)	105.2	105.5	105.9	106.3	105.1	105.8	633.8	Q
5	Han Jiayu (CHN)	105.4	106.3	105.3	105.4	106.3	105.1	633.8	Q
6	Du Yuchen (CHN)^{a}	106.3	106.4	105.1	105.1	104.7	106.0	633.6	a
7	Elavenil Valarivan (IND)	105.4	106.3	106.6	104.7	105.1	105.4	633.5	Q
8	Kwon Yun-a (KOR)	104.8	105.4	105.9	105.4	105.5	106.3	633.3	Q
9	Misaki Nobata (JPN)	104.6	104.9	106.1	105.8	106.0	105.2	632.6	Q
10	Shiori Hirata (JPN)	105.4	105.7	104.1	105.2	104.8	105.5	630.7	
11	Dominique Rachmawati Karini (INA)	105.9	105.4	105.0	104.9	104.9	104.5	630.6	
12	Vidarsa Vinod Kochalumkal (IND)	105.9	104.9	104.7	106.2	104.3	104.4	630.4	
13	Duong Ha My (VIE)	105.6	104.1	105.0	103.5	105.8	105.5	629.5	
14	Phi Thanh Thao (VIE)	105.1	105.7	104.7	104.6	105.7	103.7	629.5	
15	Alexandra Le (KAZ)	104.4	102.8	104.5	105.1	105.7	106.0	628.5	
16	Gan Chen Jie (MAS)	104.4	105.1	104.4	104.4	105.9	103.9	628.1	
17	Shermineh Chehel Amirani (IRI)	104.0	102.9	104.5	106.3	105.1	105.2	628.0	
18	Aruuke Talantbekova (KGZ)	105.5	104.9	104.0	103.8	104.4	105.0	627.6	
19	Cho Eun-byeol (KOR)	103.1	106.7	105.1	104.0	104.2	104.5	627.6	
20	Gankhuyag Nandinzaya (MGL)	103.6	104.7	104.0	105.6	105.0	104.5	627.4	
21	Najmeh Khedmati (IRI)	104.4	104.9	103.7	104.2	104.7	104.9	626.8	
22	Yelizaveta Bezrukova (KAZ)	102.8	104.3	104.1	105.2	105.8	104.6	626.8	
23	Chou Ya-Hsuan (TPE)	104.3	105.4	103.9	104.2	104.3	104.5	626.6	
24	Sung Yu-Ting (TPE)	103.8	104.2	105.0	105.0	105.4	103.2	626.6	
25	Aijan Ergeshova (KGZ)	103.3	104.4	105.2	104.5	104.3	104.4	626.1	
26	Odonkhuu Munkhzul (MGL)	104.2	102.9	105.4	104.6	103.9	104.6	625.6	
27	Le Thi Mong Tuyen (VIE)	105.3	104.8	103.1	104.9	103.5	103.7	625.3	
28	Sofiya Shulzhenko (KAZ)	105.2	102.2	105.6	103.3	104.8	103.5	624.6	
29	Easha Shaheed (MDV)	102.6	104.6	104.3	104.7	103.1	104.8	624.1	
30	Malika Lagutenko (TJK)	104.4	103.7	104.9	104.8	103.2	102.9	623.9	
31	Yasmin Figlia Achadiat (INA)	102.6	103.5	103.4	104.3	104.5	105.3	623.6	
32	Chanittha Sastwej (THA)	102.8	101.7	104.5	104.6	105.2	104.6	623.4	
33	Oyunbat Yesugen (MGL)	103.2	104.8	102.6	104.3	104.4	104.1	623.4	
34	Fatemeh Amini Pozveh (IRI)	104.8	102.0	102.7	104.3	104.3	104.5	622.6	
35	Zhibek Temirovna Bektashova (KGZ)	102.9	105.0	103.4	102.6	104.5	104.2	622.6	
36	Audrey Zahra Dhiyaanisa (INA)	104.1	104.1	104.7	105.1	99.8	104.6	622.4	
37	Fatima Obaid Khalfan Abdan Alsuwaidi (UAE)	104.0	103.6	104.3	101.4	103.0	104.8	621.1	
38	Safa Bin Sahid (BAN)	102.7	105.0	104.0	102.2	103.5	103.6	621.0	
39	Retaj Abdulrahman A A Alyafei (QAT)	103.2	104.1	103.7	103.4	103.1	103.3	620.8	
40	Sajida Haque (BAN)	103.4	102.6	102.7	103.7	103.1	105.1	620.6	
41	Lin Ying-shin (TPE)	103.9	103.5	103.9	103.3	104.6	101.4	620.6	
42	Amparo Teresa Acuna (PHI)	103.8	103.9	102.2	103.5	102.9	104.2	620.5	
43	Al Anoud Abdullah Hamed Al Khalili (OMA)	102.2	103.4	102.2	102.9	103.9	104.7	619.3	
44	Alia Husna Binti Budruddin (MAS)	102.6	101.5	103.9	104.6	103.4	103.3	619.3	
45	Ratchadaporn Plengsaengthong (THA)	103.0	103.4	103.5	103.9	103.1	102.4	619.3	
46	Mst Mehenaz Sharmin Mim (BAN)	102.4	103.2	104.8	102.9	103.0	102.8	619.1	
47	Anora Lagutenko (TJK)	103.2	103.5	101.7	102.9	102.6	104.0	617.9	
48	Thanyalak Chotphibunsin (THA)	102.1	101.7	102.9	105.2	103.0	101.4	616.3	
49	Amina Al Tarshi (OMA)	101.1	101.9	102.6	102.7	104.0	102.6	614.9	
50	Yasmin Tahlak (UAE)	102.8	100.9	103.5	101.5	102.7	102.6	614.0	
51	Almaha Mishal A B Al-Ali (QAT)	104.0	102.1	102.0	101.2	101.2	103.0	613.5	
52	Nur Suryani Mohamed Taibi (MAS)	102.0	99.6	101.4	101.7	101.3	104.1	610.1	
53	Een Aslam (MDV)	99.9	102.7	103.2	101.8	100.8	101.5	609.9	
54	Ayna Shoua Akhthar Ibrahim (MDV)	101.9	102.2	104.2	101.6	97.0	92.6	599.5	
55	Muna Hassan Yousef Alhosani (UAE)	101.4	100.1	101.2	98.7	97.9	94.1	593.4	
—	Dalal Mohammed N A Al-Qebaisi (QAT)	Did not start						DNS	
—	Mukhtasar Tokhirova (UZB)	Disqualified						DSQ	

=== Notes ===
- ^{a} Du Yuchen did not advance to the final because Asian Games shooting regulations limit a maximum of two athletes per National Olympic Committee (NOC) to progress. Her teammates Wang Zifei (1st) and Han Jiayu (5th) had already claimed China's two final spots.

=== Final ===
Rank	Athlete	1st stage		2nd stage – Elimination							S-off	Notes
Rank	Athlete	1	2	1	2	3	4	5	6	7	S-off	Notes
1st place, gold medalist(s)	Hinata Taichi (JPN)	52.2	104.0	125.5	147.0	168.0	189.7	210.8	232.2	253.0		GR
2nd place, silver medalist(s)	Elavenil Valarivan (IND)	53.1	106.0	126.9	148.4	169.6	190.3	211.1	231.9	252.4		
3rd place, bronze medalist(s)	Ban Hyo-jin (KOR)	52.2	104.9	126.3	147.2	168.2	189.0	210.0	230.4			
4	Misaki Nobata (JPN)	52.5	105.3	126.5	147.1	167.9	188.4	209.4				
5	Wang Zifei (CHN)	52.4	104.6	125.2	146.0	167.1	188.2					
6	Sonam Uttam Maskar (IND)	52.1	104.2	125.5	146.6	167.0						
7	Han Jiayu (CHN)	52.4	104.2	124.0								
8	Kwon Yun-a (KOR)	51.8	103.0									SO
