= Shooting at the 2026 Asian Games – Women's 10 metre air rifle team =

Women's 10 metre air rifle team at the 2026 Asian Games
- Venue: Aichi Prefectural Shooting Range
- Dates: 20 September 2026

Medalists
gold medal	China (CHN); Wang Zifei, Han Jiayu, Du Yuchen
silver medal	India (IND); Elavenil Valarivan, Sonam Maskar, Vidarsa Vinod
bronze medal	Japan (JPN); Hinata Taichi, Misaki Nobata, Shiori Hirata

The women's 10 metre air rifle team competition at the 2026 Asian Games in Nagoya, Japan was held on 20 September 2026 at the Aichi Prefectural Shooting Range.

== Schedule ==
All times are Japan Standard Time (UTC+09:00)

Date	Time	Event
Sunday, 20 September 2026	09:45	Final

== Records ==
Prior to this competition, the prevailing world, Asian, and Games records were as follows. Prior to this competition, the existing world, Asian and Games records were as follows.

World Record	China (CHN) (Liu Yafei, Peng Xinlu, Zhang Liyuan)	1902.0	Shymkent, Kazakhstan	21 August 2025
Asian Record	China (CHN) (Liu Yafei, Peng Xinlu, Zhang Liyuan)	1902.0	Shymkent, Kazakhstan	21 August 2025
Games Record	China (CHN) (Han Jiayu, Huang Yuting, Wang Zhilin)	1896.6	Hangzhou, China	23 September 2023

== Results ==
Legend

- DNF — Did not finish
- DNS — Did not start

Rank	Team	Series						Total	Notes
Rank	Team	1	2	3	4	5	6	Total	Notes
1st place, gold medalist(s)	China (CHN)	317.9	318.8	316.4	317.4	316.7	317.0	1904.2	WR, GR
	Wang Zifei	106.2	106.1	106.0	106.9	105.7	105.9	636.8	
	Han Jiayu	105.4	106.3	105.3	105.4	106.3	105.1	633.8	
	Du Yuchen	106.3	106.4	105.1	105.1	104.7	106.0	633.6	
2nd place, silver medalist(s)	India (IND)	316.9	316.8	317.9	316.2	314.8	315.4	1898.0	
	Sonam Maskar	105.6	105.6	106.6	105.3	105.4	105.6	634.1	
	Elavenil Valarivan	105.4	106.3	106.6	104.7	105.1	105.4	633.5	
	Vidarsa Vinod	105.9	104.9	104.7	106.2	104.3	104.4	630.4	
3rd place, bronze medalist(s)	Japan (JPN)	315.2	316.1	316.1	317.3	315.9	316.5	1897.1	
	Hinata Taichi	105.2	105.5	105.9	106.3	105.1	105.8	633.8	
	Misaki Nobata	104.6	104.9	106.1	105.8	106.0	105.2	632.6	
	Shiori Hirata	105.4	105.7	104.1	105.2	104.8	105.5	630.7	
4	South Korea (KOR)	313.5	317.4	317.1	315.5	315.3	317.0	1895.8	
	Ban Hyo-jin	105.6	105.3	106.1	106.1	105.6	106.2	634.9	
	Kwon Yun-a	104.8	105.4	105.9	105.4	105.5	106.3	633.3	
	Cho Eunb-yeol	103.1	106.7	105.1	104.0	104.2	104.5	627.6	
5	Vietnam (VIE)	316.0	314.6	312.8	313.0	315.0	312.9	1884.3	
	Le Thi Mong Tuyen	105.3	104.8	103.1	104.9	103.5	103.7	625.3	
	Phi Thanh Thao	105.1	105.7	104.7	104.6	105.7	103.7	629.5	
	Duong Ha My	105.6	104.1	105.0	103.5	105.8	105.5	629.5	
6	Kazakhstan (KAZ)	312.4	309.3	314.2	313.6	316.3	314.1	1879.9	
	Sofiya Shulzhenko	105.2	102.2	105.6	103.3	104.8	103.5	624.6	
	Alexandra Le	104.4	102.8	104.5	105.1	105.7	106.0	628.5	
	Yelizaveta Bezrukova	102.8	104.3	104.1	105.2	105.8	104.6	626.8	
7	Iran (IRI)	313.2	309.8	310.9	314.8	314.1	314.6	1877.4	
	Fatemeh Amini Pozveh	104.8	102.0	102.7	104.3	104.3	104.5	622.6	
	Shermineh Chehel Amirani	104.0	102.9	104.5	106.3	105.1	105.2	628.0	
	Najmeh Khedmati	104.4	104.9	103.7	104.2	104.7	104.9	626.8	
8	Indonesia (INA)	312.6	313.0	313.1	314.3	309.2	314.4	1876.6	
	Dominique Rachmawati Karini	105.9	105.4	105.0	104.9	104.9	104.5	630.6	
	Audrey Zahra Dhiyaanisa	104.1	104.1	104.7	105.1	99.8	104.6	622.4	
	Yasmin Figlia Achadiat	102.6	103.5	103.4	104.3	104.5	105.3	623.6	
9	Mongolia (MGL)	311.0	312.4	312.0	314.5	313.3	313.2	1876.4	
	Gankhuyag Nandinzaya	103.6	104.7	104.0	105.6	105.0	104.5	627.4	
	Oyunbat Yesugen	103.2	104.8	102.6	104.3	104.4	104.1	623.4	
	Odonkhuu Munkhzul	104.2	102.9	105.4	104.6	103.9	104.6	625.6	
10	Kyrgyzstan (KGZ)	311.7	314.3	312.6	310.9	313.2	313.6	1876.3	
	Aruuke Talantbekova	105.5	104.9	104.0	103.8	104.4	105.0	627.6	
	Zhibek Temirovna Bektashova	102.9	105.0	103.4	102.6	104.5	104.2	622.6	
	Aijan Ergeshova	103.3	104.4	105.2	104.5	104.3	104.4	626.1	
11	Chinese Taipei (TPE)	312.0	313.1	312.8	312.5	314.3	309.1	1873.8	
	Sung Yu-Ting	103.8	104.2	105.0	105.0	105.4	103.2	626.6	
	Lin Ying-shin	103.9	103.5	103.9	103.3	104.6	101.4	620.6	
	Chou Ya-Hsuan	104.3	105.4	103.9	104.2	104.3	104.5	626.6	
12	Bangladesh (BAN)	308.5	310.8	311.5	308.8	309.6	311.5	1860.7	
	Safa Bin Sahid	102.7	105.0	104.0	102.2	103.5	103.6	621.0	
	Sajida Haque	103.4	102.6	102.7	103.7	103.1	105.1	620.6	
	Mst Mehenaz Sharmin Mim	102.4	103.2	104.8	102.9	103.0	102.8	619.1	
13	Thailand (THA)	307.9	306.8	310.9	313.7	311.3	308.4	1859.0	
	Ratchadaporn Plengsaengthong	103.0	103.4	103.5	103.9	103.1	102.4	619.3	
	Thanyalak Chotphibunsin	102.1	101.7	102.9	105.2	103.0	101.4	616.3	
	Chanittha Sastwej	102.8	101.7	104.5	104.6	105.2	104.6	623.4	
14	Malaysia (MAS)	309.0	306.2	309.7	310.7	310.6	311.3	1857.5	
	Gan Chen Jie	104.4	105.1	104.4	104.4	105.9	103.9	628.1	
	Alia Husna Binti Budruddin	102.6	101.5	103.9	104.6	103.4	103.3	619.3	
	Nur Suryani Mohamed Taibi	102.0	99.6	101.4	101.7	101.3	104.1	610.1	
15	Maldives (MDV)	304.4	309.5	311.7	308.1	300.9	298.9	1833.5	
	Ayna Shoua Akhthar Ibrahim	101.9	102.2	104.2	101.6	97.0	92.6	599.5	
	Een Aslam	99.9	102.7	103.2	101.8	100.8	101.5	609.9	
	Easha Shaheed	102.6	104.6	104.3	104.7	103.1	104.8	624.1	
16	United Arab Emirates (UAE)	308.2	304.6	309.0	301.6	303.6	301.5	1828.5	
	Fatima Obaid Khalfan Abdan Alsuwaidi	104.0	103.6	104.3	101.4	103.0	104.8	621.1	
	Muna Hassan Yousef Alhosani	101.4	100.1	101.2	98.7	97.9	94.1	593.4	
	Yasmin Tahlak	102.8	100.9	103.5	101.5	102.7	102.6	614.0	
—	Qatar (QAT)	207.2	206.2	205.7	204.6	204.3	206.3	1234.3	DNF
	Almaha Mishal A B Al-Ali	104.0	102.1	102.0	101.2	101.2	103.0	613.5	
	Dalal Mohammed N A Al-Qebaisi	—	—	—	—	—	—	DNS	
	Retaj Abdulrahman A A Alyafei	103.2	104.1	103.7	103.4	103.1	103.3	620.8	
