= Shooting at the 2022 Asian Games – Women's 10 metre air rifle team =

Women's 10 metre air rifle team at the 2022 Asian Games
- Venue: Fuyang Yinhu Sports Centre
- Dates: 24 September 2023
- Competitors: 45 from 15 nations

Medalists
gold medal	China; Han Jiayu, Huang Yuting, Wang Zhilin
silver medal	India; Ashi Chouksey, Mehuli Ghosh, Ramita Jindal
bronze medal	Mongolia; Gankhuyagiin Nandinzayaa, Chuluunbadrakhyn Narantuyaa, Oyuunbatyn Yesügen

The women's 10 metre air rifle team competition at the 2022 Asian Games in Hangzhou, China was held on 24 September 2023 at Fuyang Yinhu Sports Centre.

== Schedule ==
All times are China Standard Time (UTC+08:00)

Date	Time	Event
Sunday, 24 September 2023	08:30	Final

== Records ==
Prior to this competition, the existing world, Asian and Games records were as follows.

World Record	United States	1898.4	Lima, Peru	9 November 2022
Asian Record	China	1893.0	Kuwait City, Kuwait	4 November 2018
Games Record	—	—	—	—

== Results ==
Legend

- DNS — Did not start

Rank	Team	Series						Total	Notes
Rank	Team	1	2	3	4	5	6	Total	Notes
1st place, gold medalist(s)	China (CHN)	316.2	312.8	316.6	317.3	317.5	316.2	1896.6	AR
	Han Jiayu	105.8	104.3	106.0	106.2	105.7	106.1	634.1	
	Huang Yuting	105.8	104.7	104.1	105.5	106.5	105.0	631.6	
	Wang Zhilin	104.6	103.8	106.5	105.6	105.3	105.1	630.9	
2nd place, silver medalist(s)	India (IND)	312.1	316.9	314.7	314.2	312.8	315.3	1886.0	
	Ashi Chouksey	103.2	104.5	104.9	104.8	102.5	103.4	623.3	
	Mehuli Ghosh	104.6	105.7	104.6	105.1	104.9	105.9	630.8	
	Ramita Jindal	104.3	106.7	105.2	104.3	105.4	106.0	631.9	
3rd place, bronze medalist(s)	Mongolia (MGL)	314.0	313.2	311.3	315.6	313.1	312.8	1880.0	
	Gankhuyagiin Nandinzayaa	106.1	106.0	104.8	104.7	104.4	104.2	630.2	
	Chuluunbadrakhyn Narantuyaa	103.7	102.7	102.1	104.9	103.7	103.8	620.9	
	Oyuunbatyn Yesügen	104.2	104.5	104.4	106.0	105.0	104.8	628.9	
4	Singapore (SGP)	312.0	311.9	314.7	312.7	313.3	312.3	1876.9	
	Eunice Leow	102.9	103.1	104.1	103.6	104.5	103.9	622.1	
	Fernel Tan	104.9	105.0	105.2	104.4	105.4	103.9	628.8	
	Martina Veloso	104.2	103.8	105.4	104.7	103.4	104.5	626.0	
5	South Korea (KOR)	313.0	308.3	316.6	311.0	315.6	312.3	1876.8	
	Cho Eun-young	103.2	102.8	104.6	102.9	105.6	102.8	621.9	
	Jang Jeong-in	102.6	100.8	106.0	104.1	105.3	103.6	622.4	
	Lee Eun-seo	105.2	104.7	106.0	104.0	104.7	105.9	630.5	
6	Chinese Taipei (TPE)	311.9	313.1	314.2	312.5	312.8	312.3	1876.8	
	Chen Chi	104.0	105.2	105.6	104.6	104.3	105.4	629.1	
	Lin Ying-shin	105.3	105.2	104.1	103.6	104.5	103.5	626.2	
	Sung Yu-ting	102.6	102.7	104.5	104.3	104.0	103.4	621.5	
7	Vietnam (VIE)	310.4	313.6	312.7	314.5	313.3	311.8	1876.3	
	Lê Thị Mộng Tuyền	104.2	104.8	103.9	103.6	105.0	105.4	626.9	
	Nguyễn Thị Thảo	103.0	104.9	104.3	104.9	104.7	104.1	625.9	
	Phí Thanh Thảo	103.2	103.9	104.5	106.0	103.6	102.3	623.5	
8	Iran (IRI)	313.2	311.8	312.2	311.1	313.6	314.1	1876.0	
	Elaheh Ahmadi	105.0	105.2	102.5	103.9	105.2	105.1	626.9	
	Shermineh Chehel-Amirani	104.0	103.7	106.6	104.6	104.5	105.2	628.6	
	Najmeh Khedmati	104.2	102.9	103.1	102.6	103.9	103.8	620.5	
9	Bangladesh (BAN)	313.7	312.8	316.4	309.9	310.1	313.1	1876.0	
	Shaira Arefin	105.2	104.7	106.5	103.6	103.9	104.1	628.0	
	Kamrun Nahar Koly	104.4	103.4	104.7	103.3	102.9	104.6	623.3	
	Nafisha Tabasum	104.1	104.7	105.2	103.0	103.3	104.4	624.7	
10	Japan (JPN)	307.8	311.4	310.8	310.5	310.3	312.1	1862.9	
	Shiori Hirata	103.8	104.6	104.2	103.7	104.1	105.3	625.7	
	Yasuyo Matsumoto	101.1	102.9	104.0	102.4	102.1	102.8	615.3	
	Haruka Nakaguchi	102.9	103.9	102.6	104.4	104.1	104.0	621.9	
11	Indonesia (INA)	311.0	311.9	310.5	309.3	308.8	310.6	1862.1	
	Amelia Sifaul Citra	103.0	103.7	102.3	102.8	102.7	102.8	617.3	
	Audrey Zahra Dhiyaanisa	103.0	104.1	104.6	103.0	102.4	104.9	622.0	
	Masayyu Putri Fadillah	105.0	104.1	103.6	103.5	103.7	102.9	622.8	
12	Kyrgyzstan (KGZ)	306.6	311.2	310.8	310.9	308.0	311.1	1858.6	
	Tamiris Abdykerimova	99.2	104.8	102.0	104.2	101.1	102.7	614.0	
	Aijan Ergeshova	102.9	102.8	102.5	103.7	102.6	103.1	617.6	
	Aruuke Talantbekova	104.5	103.6	106.3	103.0	104.3	105.3	627.0	
13	Thailand (THA)	308.4	309.3	310.1	311.4	308.0	309.0	1856.2	
	Thanyalak Chotphibunsin	103.4	103.9	104.6	103.7	103.0	103.0	621.6	
	Jayden Mohprasit	101.1	102.3	100.9	101.8	100.6	102.8	609.5	
	Chanittha Sastwej	103.9	103.1	104.6	105.9	104.4	103.2	625.1	
14	Oman (OMA)	306.8	307.2	308.0	307.7	307.1	305.4	1842.2	
	Siham Al-Hasani	101.3	103.7	102.2	103.3	103.2	101.9	615.6	
	Al-Anoud Al-Khalili	102.4	102.1	102.3	102.2	104.1	101.8	614.9	
	Amina Al-Tarshi	103.1	101.4	103.5	102.2	99.8	101.7	611.7	
—	Qatar (QAT)							DNS	
	Matara Al-Aseiri	101.4	100.6	101.7	102.3	103.6	101.3	610.9	
	Shahd Al-Darwish							DNS	
	Aisha Al-Mahmoud							DNS	
