= Shooting at the 2024 Summer Olympics – Women's 50 metre rifle three positions =

Women's 50 metre rifle three positions at the Games of the XXXIII Olympiad
- Venue: National Shooting Center, Châteauroux
- Dates: 1 August 2024 (qualification); 2 August 2024 (final)
- Competitors: 32 from 22 nations

Medalists
1st place, gold medalist(s)		Chiara Leone	Switzerland
2nd place, silver medalist(s)		Sagen Maddalena	United States
3rd place, bronze medalist(s)		Zhang Qiongyue	China

The women's 50 metre rifle three positions event at the 2024 Summer Olympics took place on 1 and 2 August 2024 at the National Shooting Center, Châteauroux in France.

== Records ==
Prior to this competition, the existing world and Olympic records were as follows.

Qualifying records
World record	Jenny Stene (NOR)	596	Wrocław, Poland	15 September 2022
Olympic record	Not established			

Final records
World record	Petra Zublasing (ITA)	464.7	Baku, Azerbaijan	19 June 2015
Olympic record	Nina Christen (SUI)	463.9	Tokyo, Japan	31 July 2021

== Schedule ==
All times are Central European Summer Time (UTC+2)

Date	Time	Round
Thursday, 1 August 2024	12:00	Qualification
Friday, 2 August 2024	9:30	Final

== Results ==
=== Qualification ===
Rank	Athlete	Country	Kneeling	Prone	Standing	Total	Notes
1	Sagen Maddalena	United States	198	200	195	593-45x	Q, OR
2	Zhang Qiongyue	China	199	199	195	593-40x	Q, OR
3	Chiara Leone	Switzerland	196	199	197	592-29x	Q
4	Oyuunbatyn Yesügen	Mongolia	193	199	197	589-40x	Q
5	Jeanette Hegg Duestad	Norway	195	199	195	589-34x	Q
6	Natalia Kochańska	Poland	195	198	196	589-30x	Q
7	Nadine Ungerank	Austria	197	197	195	589-27x	Q
8	Stephanie Grundsøe	Denmark	196	199	194	589-26x	Q
9	Jolyn Beer	Germany	196	198	193	587-29x	
10	Alexandra Le	Kazakhstan	195	198	194	587-28x	
11	Anna Janßen	Germany	197	198	192	587-27x	
12	Seonaid McIntosh	Great Britain	199	198	189	586-38x	
13	Arina Altukhova	Kazakhstan	195	200	191	586-35x	
14	Rikke Maeng Ibsen	Denmark	196	193	197	586-26x	
15	Jenny Stene	Norway	194	198	193	585-37x	
16	Veronika Blažíčková	Czech Republic	195	198	191	584-32x	
17	Judith Gomez	France	196	194	192	584-28x	
18	Anjum Moudgil	India	196	194	194	584-26x	
19	Lee Eun-seo	South Korea	193	197	193	583-35x	
20	Aleksandra Pietruk	Poland	192	197	193	582-30x	
21	Nina Christen	Switzerland	193	197	192	582-23x	
22	Geovana Meyer	Brazil	194	197	190	581-31x	
23	Barbara Gambaro	Italy	193	197	192	580-26x	
24	Darya Chuprys	Individual Neutral Athletes	193	197	192	579-23x	
25	Mary Tucker	United States	192	195	192	579-20x	
26	Yarimar Mercado	Puerto Rico	192	197	189	578-29x	
27	Han Jiayu	China	195	197	186	578-26x	
28	Lisbet Hernández	Cuba	191	197	190	578-25x	
29	Eszter Mészáros	Hungary	196	198	193	577-29x	
30	Im Ha-na	South Korea	192	195	190	577-21x	
31	Sift Kaur Samra	India	193	195	187	575-22x	
32	Shannon Westlake	Canada	187	193	187	567-16x	

=== Final ===
Rank	Athlete	Country	Series													Total	Notes
Rank	Athlete	Country	Kneeling			Prone			Standing							Total	Notes
Rank	Athlete	Country	1	2	3	4	5	6	7	8	9s41	9s42	9s43	9s44	9s45	Total	Notes
1st place, gold medalist(s)	Chiara Leone	Switzerland	52.0	51.6	52.6	51.1	52.6	53.2	50.2	51.1	10.2	8.8	10.5	9.7	10.8	464.4	OR
2nd place, silver medalist(s)	Sagen Maddalena	United States	52.2	52.2	51.5	52.3	53.0	52.8	47.8	51.1	9.9	10.8	9.4	9.9	10.1	463.0	
3rd place, bronze medalist(s)	Zhang Qiongyue	China	50.5	52.8	52.7	52.1	52.3	52.9	51.4	51.1	8.5	8.8	10.1	9.7		452.9	
4	Jeanette Hegg Duestad	Norway	51.0	51.9	51.8	52.1	52.9	52.6	51.0	48.0	10.9	10.6	9.7			442.5	
5	Nadine Ungerank	Austria	51.9	52.1	52.2	50.6	52.0	53.2	50.3	50.9	9.9	9.0				432.1	
6	Natalia Kochańska	Poland	50.5	50.9	51.8	52.0	51.1	50.6	49.9	51.3	10.4					418.5	
7	Oyuunbatyn Yesügen	Mongolia	50.7	51.1	51.7	50.8	51.9	51.1	48.5	51.8						407.6	
8	Stephanie Grundsøe	Denmark	51.3	50.7	50.7	52.6	52.2	51.6	50.7	46.6						406.4	
