= Hinata Taichi =

Japanese sport shooter (born 2005)

Personal information
- Native name: 泰地 陽詩
- Nationality: Japanese
- Born: July 13, 2005 (age 21) Tokushima, Japan

Sport
- Country: Japan
- Sport: Shooting
- Events: 10 metre air rifle 50 metre rifle three positions
Medal record
Women's sport shooting
Representing Japan
World Championships
Bronze medal – third place	2026 Doha	10 m air rifle team
Asian Games
Gold medal – first place	2026 Aichi-Nagoya	10 m air rifle
Bronze medal – third place	2026 Aichi-Nagoya	10 m air rifle team
Asian Shooting Championships
Bronze medal – third place	2025 Shymkent	10 m rifle mixed team

Hinata Taichi (Japanese: 泰地 陽詩; born 13 July 2005) is a Japanese sport shooter who competes in rifle events. She represents Japan in the 10 metre air rifle and 50 metre rifle three positions events and is affiliated with Meiji University. She won the gold medal in the women's 10 metre air rifle at the 2026 Asian Games in Aichi and Nagoya, Japan, setting an Asian Games record of 253.0 points in the final.

== Early life and career ==
Taichi was born on 13 July 2005 and is from Tokushima Prefecture. She studies at Meiji University and represents the university in shooting competitions.

In 2023, Taichi competed internationally at the East Asia Youth Airgun Competition in Tochigi, Japan, where she finished third in the women's 10 metre air rifle event.

In September 2024, Taichi won a bronze medal for Japan in the 10 metre air rifle mixed team event at an International Shooting Sport Federation competition. She competed alongside Atsushi Shimada.

In August 2025, Taichi won the bronze medal in the 10 metre rifle mixed team event at the 2025 Asian Shooting Championships in Shymkent, Kazakhstan, partnering with Naoki Hanakawa. In June 2025, she also won the women's 10 metre air rifle standing 60-shot event at the Japan Student Selection Sports Shooting Competition.

At the 2026 Asian Games in Aichi and Nagoya, Taichi won the gold medal in the women's 10 metre air rifle. She scored 253.0 points in the final, defeating India's Elavenil Valarivan and South Korea's Ban Hyo-jin, and set a new Asian Games record. She also won the bronze medal in the women's 10 metre air rifle team event with Japan and finished fourth in the women's 50 metre rifle three positions team event.
