= 2023 ISSF World Cup =

Shooting competition

- Sport: Shooting
- Hosts: (Kazakhstan) Almaty (Azerbaijan) Baku (India) Bhopal (Egypt) Cairo (Qatar) Doha (Indonesia) Jakarta (Cyprus) Larnaca (Peru) Lima (Italy) Lonato (Morocco) Rabat (Brazil) Rio de Janeiro
- Duration: 11 January – 27 November

Seasons
- ← 2022 2024 →

The 2023 ISSF World Cup is the annual edition of the ISSF World Cup in the Olympic shooting events, governed by the International Shooting Sport Federation.

== Calendar ==
The calendar for the 2023 ISSF World Cup include 12 stages.

| Leg | Dates | Location | Type | Venue |
|---|---|---|---|---|
| 1 | 11–24 January | (Morocco) Rabat | Shotgun | Club Les Chênes Shooting Range |
| 2 | 27 January – 7 February | (Indonesia) Jakarta | Rifle/Pistol | Senayan Shooting Range |
| 3 | 17–24 February | (Egypt) Cairo | Rifle/Pistol | Egypt International Olympic City Shooting Range |
| 4 | 04–13 March | (Qatar) Doha | Shotgun | Lusail Shooting Range |
| 5 | 20–31 March | (India) Bhopal | Rifle/Pistol | Madhya Pradesh Shooting Academy |
| 6 | 25 March – 3 April | (Cyprus) Larnaca | Shotgun | Larnaca Olympic Shooting Range |
| 7 | 11–24 April | (Peru) Lima | Rifle/Pistol | Las Palmas Shooting Range |
| 8 | 25 April – 6 May | (Egypt) Cairo | Shotgun | Egypt International Olympic City Shooting Range |
| 9 | 08–15 May | (Azerbaijan) Baku | Rifle/Pistol | Baku Olympic Shooting Range |
| 10 | 20–29 May | (Kazakhstan) Almaty | Shotgun | Asanov Shooting Club |
| 11 | 06–17 July | (Italy) Lonato | Shotgun | Trap Concaverde |
| 12 | 08–19 September | (Brazil) Rio de Janeiro | Rifle/Pistol | Centro Militar de Tiro Esportivo |
| 13 | 18–27 November | (Qatar) Doha | (World Cup Final) Rifle/Pistol/Shotgun | Lusail Shooting Range |

== Rifle events ==
=== Men's individual ===
10m Air Rifle
| Stage | Venue | 1st place, gold medalist(s) | 2nd place, silver medalist(s) | 3rd place, bronze medalist(s) |
|---|---|---|---|---|
| 1 | (Indonesia) Jakarta | Naoya Okada (JPN) | Konstantin Malinovskiy (KAZ) | Marcus Madsen (SWE) |
| 2 | (Egypt) Cairo | Rudrankksh Patil (IND) | Maximilian Ulbrich (GER) | Miran Maričić (CRO) |
| 3 | (India) Bhopal | Sheng Lihao (CHN) | Du Linshu (CHN) | Rudrankksh Patil (IND) |
| 4 | (Peru) Lima | Zalán Pekler (HUN) | Naoya Okada (JPN) | Jiří Přívratský (CZE) |
| 5 | (Azerbaijan) Baku | Zalán Pekler (HUN) | Hriday Hazarika (IND) | Sheng Lihao (CHN) |
| 6 | (Brazil) Rio de Janeiro | Danilo Sollazzo (ITA) | Maximilian Dallinger (GER) | Jon-Hermann Hegg (NOR) |
| Final | (Qatar) Doha | Zalán Pekler (HUN) | Lazar Kovacevic (SRB) | Jiří Přívratský (CZE) |

50m Rifle 3 Positions
| Stage | Venue | 1st place, gold medalist(s) | 2nd place, silver medalist(s) | 3rd place, bronze medalist(s) |
|---|---|---|---|---|
| 1 | (Indonesia) Jakarta | Zalán Pekler (HUN) | István Péni (HUN) | Maciej Kowalewicz (POL) |
| 2 | (Egypt) Cairo | Aishwary Pratap Singh Tomar (IND) | Alexander Schmirl (AUT) | Andreas Thum (AUT) |
| 3 | (India) Bhopal | Du Linshu (CHN) | István Péni (HUN) | Jan Lochbihler (SUI) |
| 4 | (Peru) Lima | Jiří Přívratský (CZE) | István Péni (HUN) | Petr Nymburský (CZE) |
| 5 | (Azerbaijan) Baku | Jiří Přívratský (CZE) | Serhiy Kulish (UKR) | Petr Nymburský (CZE) |
| 6 | (Brazil) Rio de Janeiro | Liu Yukun (CHN) | Jon-Hermann Hegg (NOR) | István Péni (HUN) |
| Final | (Qatar) Doha | Lucas Bernard Denis Kryzs (FRA) | Liu Yukun (CHN) | Jon-Hermann Hegg (NOR) |

50m Rifle Prone
| Stage | Venue | 1st place, gold medalist(s) | 2nd place, silver medalist(s) | 3rd place, bronze medalist(s) |
|---|---|---|---|---|
| 1 | (Indonesia) Jakarta | Jan Lochbihler (SUI) | Cristoph Duerr (SUI) | Bernhard Pickl (AUT) |
| 2 | (Egypt) Cairo | No event | | |
| 3 | (India) Bhopal | No event | | |
| 4 | (Peru) Lima | No event | | |
| 5 | (Azerbaijan) Baku | No event | | |
| 6 | (Brazil) Rio de Janeiro | No event | | |

=== Men's team ===
Air Rifle
| Stage | Venue | 1st place, gold medalist(s) | 2nd place, silver medalist(s) | 3rd place, bronze medalist(s) |
|---|---|---|---|---|
| 1 | (Indonesia) Jakarta | Austria; Bernhard Pickl; Alexander Schmirl; Martin Strempfl | Kazakhstan; Konstantin Malinovskiy; Nikita Shakhtorin; Islam Satpaev | South Korea; Mo Daiseoung; You Jaejin; Kim Younjae |
| 2 | (Egypt) Cairo | No event | | |
| 3 | (India) Bhopal | No event | | |
| 4 | (Peru) Lima | No event | | |
| 5 | (Azerbaijan) Baku | No event | | |
| 6 | (Brazil) Rio de Janeiro | No event | | |

50m Rifle 3 Positions
| Stage | Venue | 1st place, gold medalist(s) | 2nd place, silver medalist(s) | 3rd place, bronze medalist(s) |
|---|---|---|---|---|
| 1 | (Indonesia) Jakarta | Indonesia; Mohammad Hasan Busri; Trisnarmanto; Fathur Gustafian | Kazakhstan; Islam Satpaev; Matvey Timofeyev; Konstantin Malinovskiy | Austria; Thomas Mathis; Bernhard Pickl; Andreas Thum |
| 2 | (Egypt) Cairo | No event | | |
| 3 | (India) Bhopal | No event | | |
| 4 | (Peru) Lima | No event | | |
| 5 | (Azerbaijan) Baku | No event | | |
| 6 | (Brazil) Rio de Janeiro | No event | | |

=== Women's individual ===
10m Air Rifle
| Stage | Venue | 1st place, gold medalist(s) | 2nd place, silver medalist(s) | 3rd place, bronze medalist(s) |
|---|---|---|---|---|
| 1 | (Indonesia) Jakarta | Eszter Mészáros (HUN) | Aneta Stankiewicz (POL) | Laura-Georgeta Ilie (ROU) |
| 2 | (Egypt) Cairo | Seonaid McIntosh (GBR) | Nina Christen (SUI) | Tilottama Sen (IND) |
| 3 | (India) Bhopal | Huang Yuting (CHN) | Mary Carolynn Tucker (USA) | Alexandra Le (KAZ) |
| 4 | (Peru) Lima | Zhilin Wang (CHN) | Eszter Mészáros (HUN) | Jeanette Hegg Duestad (NOR) |
| 5 | (Azerbaijan) Baku | Jiayu Han (CHN) | Nancy Nancy (IND) | Huang Yuting (CHN) |
| 6 | (Brazil) Rio de Janeiro | Elavenil Valarivan (IND) | Oceanne Muller (FRA) | Jiale Zhang (CHN) |
| Final | (Qatar) Doha | Aneta Stankiewicz (POL) | Zhilin Wang (CHN) | Jeanette Hegg Duestad (NOR) |

50m Rifle 3 Positions
| Stage | Venue | 1st place, gold medalist(s) | 2nd place, silver medalist(s) | 3rd place, bronze medalist(s) |
|---|---|---|---|---|
| 1 | (Indonesia) Jakarta | Arina Altukhova (KAZ) | Nina Christen (SUI) | Rikke Ibsen (DEN) |
| 2 | (Egypt) Cairo | Nina Christen (SUI) | Jeanette Hegg Duestad (NOR) | Jenny Stene (NOR) |
| 3 | (India) Bhopal | Zhang Qiongyue (CHN) | Aneta Brabcova (CZE) | Sift Kaur Samra (IND) |
| 4 | (Peru) Lima | Siyu Xia (CHN) | Mengyao Shi (CHN) | Jeanette Hegg Duestad (NOR) |
| 5 | (Azerbaijan) Baku | Seonaid McIntosh (GBR) | Jeanette Hegg Duestad (NOR) | Lisa Mueller (GER) |
| 6 | (Brazil) Rio de Janeiro | Jeanette Hegg Duestad (NOR) | Nischal Nischal (IND) | Stephanie Grundsoee (DEN) |
| Final | (Qatar) Doha | Jeanette Hegg Duestad (NOR) | Jenny Stene (NOR) | Lisa Mueller (GER) |

50m Rifle Prone
| Stage | Venue | 1st place, gold medalist(s) | 2nd place, silver medalist(s) | 3rd place, bronze medalist(s) |
|---|---|---|---|---|
| 1 | (Indonesia) Jakarta | Daniela Peskova (SVK) | Stephanie Grundsoee (DEN) | Sarina Hitz (SUI) |
| 2 | (Egypt) Cairo | No event | | |
| 3 | (India) Bhopal | No event | | |
| 4 | (Peru) Lima | No event | | |
| 5 | (Azerbaijan) Baku | No event | | |
| 6 | (Brazil) Rio de Janeiro | No event | | |

=== Women's team ===
Air Rifle
| Stage | Venue | 1st place, gold medalist(s) | 2nd place, silver medalist(s) | 3rd place, bronze medalist(s) |
|---|---|---|---|---|
| 1 | (Indonesia) Jakarta | Kazakhstan; Alexandra Le; Anastassiya Grigoryeva; Yelizaveta Bezrukova | Singapore; Natanya Huiyi Tan; Fernel Qian Ni Tan; Martina Lindsay Veloso | Indonesia; Audrey Zahra Dhiyaanisa; Khairunnisa Salsabela; Masayyu Putri Fadilah |
| 2 | (Egypt) Cairo | No event | | |
| 3 | (India) Bhopal | No event | | |
| 4 | (Peru) Lima | No event | | |
| 5 | (Azerbaijan) Baku | No event | | |
| 6 | (Brazil) Rio de Janeiro | No event | | |

50m Rifle 3 Positions
| Stage | Venue | 1st place, gold medalist(s) | 2nd place, silver medalist(s) | 3rd place, bronze medalist(s) |
|---|---|---|---|---|
| 1 | (Indonesia) Jakarta | Switzerland; Sarina Hitz; Franziska Stark; Chiara Leone | Kazakhstan; Arina Altukhova; Yelizaveta Bezrukova; Alexandra Le | Indonesia; Vidya Rafika Toyyiba; Diaz Kusumawardani; Audrey Zahra Dhiyaanisa |
| 2 | (Egypt) Cairo | No event | | |
| 3 | (India) Bhopal | No event | | |
| 4 | (Peru) Lima | No event | | |
| 5 | (Azerbaijan) Baku | No event | | |
| 6 | (Brazil) Rio de Janeiro | No event | | |

=== Mixed team ===
10m Air Rifle
| Stage | Venue | 1st place, gold medalist(s) | 2nd place, silver medalist(s) | 3rd place, bronze medalist(s) |
|---|---|---|---|---|
| 1 | (Indonesia) Jakarta | Hungary; Eszter Meszaros; Istvan Peni | Austria; Jasmin Kitzbichler; Martin Strempfl | Poland; Atena Stankiewicz; Maciej Kowalewicz; Sweden; Isabelle Johansson; Marcus Madsen |
| 2 | (Egypt) Cairo | India; Narmada Nitin Raju; Rudrankksh Patil | Hungary; Eszter Denies; Istvan Peni | Germany; Lisa Mueller; Maximilian Dallinger |
| 3 | (India) Bhopal | China; Huang Yuting; Sheng Lihao | Hungary; Eszter Denies; Istvan Peni | India; Narendra Nitin Raju; Rudrankksh Patil |
| 4 | (Peru) Lima | Hungary; Eszter Denies; Zalán Pekler | France; Oceanne Muller; Brian Baudouin | Poland; Atena Stankiewicz; Tomasz Bartnik |
| 5 | (Azerbaijan) Baku | China; Huang Yuting; Sheng Lihao | China; Zhilin Wang; Haoran Yang | Czech Republic; Aneta Brabcova; Frantisek Smetana |
| 6 | (Brazil) Rio de Janeiro | Germany; Anna Janssen; Maximilian Ulbrich | Hungary; Meszaros Eszter; Pekler Zalan | Israel; Tashtchiev Olga; Richter Sergey |

50m Rifle 3 Positions
| Stage | Venue | 1st place, gold medalist(s) | 2nd place, silver medalist(s) | 3rd place, bronze medalist(s) |
|---|---|---|---|---|
| 1 | (Indonesia) Jakarta | Switzerland; Franziska Stark; Jan Lochbihler | Switzerland; Christoph Duerr; Sarina Hitz | Kazakhstan; Yelizaveta Bezrukova; Islam Satpaev |
| 2 | (Egypt) Cairo | No event | | |
| 3 | (India) Bhopal | No event | | |
| 4 | (Peru) Lima | No event | | |
| 5 | (Azerbaijan) Baku | No event | | |
| 6 | (Brazil) Rio de Janeiro | No event | | |

==== Medal table ====
| Rank | Nation | Gold | Silver | Bronze | Total |
|---|---|---|---|---|---|
| 1 | China (CHN) | 10 | 5 | 3 | 18 |
| 2 | Hungary (HUN) | 7 | 7 | 1 | 15 |
| 3 | Switzerland (SUI) | 4 | 4 | 2 | 10 |
| 4 | India (IND) | 4 | 3 | 4 | 11 |
| 5 | Norway (NOR) | 2 | 4 | 6 | 12 |
| 6 | Kazakhstan (KAZ) | 2 | 4 | 2 | 8 |
| 7 | Czech Republic (CZE) | 2 | 1 | 5 | 8 |
| 8 | Great Britain (GBR) | 2 | 0 | 0 | 2 |
| 9 | Austria (AUT) | 1 | 2 | 3 | 6 |
| 9 | Germany (GER) | 1 | 2 | 3 | 6 |
| 11 | France (FRA) | 1 | 2 | 0 | 3 |
| 12 | Poland (POL) | 1 | 1 | 3 | 5 |
| 13 | Japan (JPN) | 1 | 1 | 0 | 2 |
| 14 | Indonesia (INA) | 1 | 0 | 2 | 3 |
| 15 | Italy (ITA) | 1 | 0 | 0 | 1 |
| 15 | Slovakia (SVK) | 1 | 0 | 0 | 1 |
| 17 | Denmark (DEN) | 0 | 1 | 2 | 3 |
| 18 | Serbia (SRB) | 0 | 1 | 0 | 1 |
| 18 | Singapore (SGP) | 0 | 1 | 0 | 1 |
| 18 | Ukraine (UKR) | 0 | 1 | 0 | 1 |
| 18 | United States (USA) | 0 | 1 | 0 | 1 |
| 22 | Sweden (SWE) | 0 | 0 | 2 | 2 |
| 23 | Croatia (CRO) | 0 | 0 | 1 | 1 |
| 23 | Israel (ISR) | 0 | 0 | 1 | 1 |
| 23 | Romania (ROU) | 0 | 0 | 1 | 1 |
| 23 | South Korea (KOR) | 0 | 0 | 1 | 1 |
| Totals (26 entries) | | 41 | 41 | 42 | 124 |

== Pistol events ==
=== Men's individual ===
10m Air Pistol
| Stage | Venue | 1st place, gold medalist(s) | 2nd place, silver medalist(s) | 3rd place, bronze medalist(s) |
|---|---|---|---|---|
| 1 | (Indonesia) Jakarta | Mukhammad Kamalov (UZB) | İsmail Keleş (TUR) | Muhamad Iqbal Prabowa (INA) |
| 2 | (Egypt) Cairo | Juraj Tužinský (SVK) | Paolo Monna (ITA) | Varun Tomar (IND) |
| 3 | (India) Bhopal | Sarabjot Singh (IND) | Ruslan Lunev (AZE) | Varun Tomar (IND) |
| 4 | (Peru) Lima | Damir Mikec (SRB) | Zhang Bowen (CHN) | İsmail Keleş (TUR) |
| 5 | (Azerbaijan) Baku | Sajjad Pourhosseini (IRI) | Oleh Omelchuk (UKR) | Robin Walter (GER) |
| 6 | (Brazil) Rio de Janeiro | Federico Nilo Maldini (ITA) | Emils Vasermanis (LAT) | Lauris Strautmanis (LAT) |
| Final | (Qatar) Doha | Robin Walter (GER) | Paolo Monna (ITA) | Juraj Tužinský (SVK) |

25m Rapid Fire Pistol
| Stage | Venue | 1st place, gold medalist(s) | 2nd place, silver medalist(s) | 3rd place, bronze medalist(s) |
|---|---|---|---|---|
| 1 | (Indonesia) Jakarta | Nikita Chiryukin (KAZ) | Sergei Evglevski (AUS) | Song Jong-ho (KOR) |
| 2 | (Egypt) Cairo | Massimo Spinella (ITA) | Clément Bessaguet (FRA) | Anish Bhanwala (IND) |
| 3 | (India) Bhopal | Zhang Jueming (CHN) | Clément Bessaguet (FRA) | Christian Reitz (GER) |
| 4 | (Peru) Lima | Clément Bessaguet (FRA) | Matěj Rampula (CZE) | Ruslan Lunev (AZE) |
| 5 | (Azerbaijan) Baku | Li Yuehong (CHN) | Clément Bessaguet (FRA) | Florian Peter (GER) |
| 6 | (Brazil) Rio de Janeiro | Jean Quiquampoix (FRA) | Lu Zhiming (CHN) | Oskar Miliwek (POL) |
| Final | (Qatar) Doha | Florian Peter (GER) | Li Yuehong (CHN) | Anish Bhanwala (IND) |

=== Men's team ===
Air Pistol
| Stage | Venue | 1st place, gold medalist(s) | 2nd place, silver medalist(s) | 3rd place, bronze medalist(s) |
|---|---|---|---|---|
| 1 | (Indonesia) Jakarta | Turkey; Buğra Tavşan; Ismail Keleş; Yusuf Dikeç | Kazakhstan; Nikita Chiryukin; Alexey Lotarev; Valeriy Rakhimzhan | South Korea; Kim Mo-se; Han Seung-woo; Kim Cheong-yong |
| 2 | (Egypt) Cairo | No event | | |
| 3 | (India) Bhopal | No event | | |
| 4 | (Peru) Lima | No event | | |
| 5 | (Azerbaijan) Baku | No event | | |
| 6 | (Brazil) Rio de Janeiro | No event | | |

=== Women's individual ===
10m Air Pistol
| Stage | Venue | 1st place, gold medalist(s) | 2nd place, silver medalist(s) | 3rd place, bronze medalist(s) |
|---|---|---|---|---|
| 1 | (Indonesia) Jakarta | Oh Ye-jin (KOR) | Sylvia Steiner (AUT) | Liu Heng Yu (TPE) |
| 2 | (Egypt) Cairo | Veronika Major (HUN) | Zorana Arunović (SRB) | Anna Korakaki (GRE) |
| 3 | (India) Bhopal | Li Xue (CHN) | Doreen Vennekamp (GER) | Qian Wei (CHN) |
| 4 | (Peru) Lima | Jiang Ranxin (CHN) | Klaudia Breś (POL) | Zhao Nan (CHN) |
| 5 | (Azerbaijan) Baku | Anna Korakaki (GRE) | Olena Kostevych (UKR) | Rhythm Sangwan (IND) |
| 6 | (Brazil) Rio de Janeiro | Elmira Karapetyan (ARM) | Wang Siyu (CHN) | Qian Wei (CHN) |
| Final | (Qatar) Doha | Li Xue (CHN) | Zhao Nan (CHN) | Jiang Ranxin (CHN) |

25m Pistol
| Stage | Venue | 1st place, gold medalist(s) | 2nd place, silver medalist(s) | 3rd place, bronze medalist(s) |
|---|---|---|---|---|
| 1 | (Indonesia) Jakarta | Sylvia Steiner (AUT) | Teh Xiu Hong (SGP) | Kwak Jung-hye (KOR) |
| 2 | (Egypt) Cairo | Veronika Major (HUN) | Doreen Vennekamp (GER) | Teh Giu Yi (SGP) |
| 3 | (India) Bhopal | Doreen Vennekamp (GER) | Du Ziyue (CHN) | Manu Bhaker (IND) |
| 4 | (Peru) Lima | Feng Sixuan (CHN) | Anastasiia Nimets (UKR) | Zhao Nan (CHN) |
| 5 | (Azerbaijan) Baku | Feng Sixuan (CHN) | Hanieh Rostamian (IRI) | Doreen Vennekamp (GER) |
| 6 | (Brazil) Rio de Janeiro | Veronika Major (HUN) | Shang Kaiyan (CHN) | Chen Yan (CHN) |
| Final | (Qatar) Doha | Feng Sixuan (CHN) | Doreen Vennekamp (GER) | Zhao Nan (CHN) |

=== Women's team ===
Air Pistol
| Stage | Venue | 1st place, gold medalist(s) | 2nd place, silver medalist(s) | 3rd place, bronze medalist(s) |
|---|---|---|---|---|
| 1 | (Indonesia) Jakarta | South Korea; Oh Ye Jin; Kim Juhee; YOh Min Kyung | Uzbekistan; Nigina Saidkulova; Sitora Erghashoeva; Alina Tarasova | Indonesia; Lily Sulistiadewi Tirthajaya; Rihadatul Asyifa; Arista Putri Darmoyo |
| 2 | (Egypt) Cairo | No event | | |
| 3 | (India) Bhopal | No event | | |
| 4 | (Peru) Lima | No event | | |
| 5 | (Azerbaijan) Baku | No event | | |
| 6 | (Brazil) Rio de Janeiro | No event | | |

25m Pistol
| Stage | Venue | 1st place, gold medalist(s) | 2nd place, silver medalist(s) | 3rd place, bronze medalist(s) |
|---|---|---|---|---|
| 1 | (Indonesia) Jakarta | Singapore; Teh Xiu Hong; Theo Shun Xie; Teh Xiu Yi | South Korea; Oh Min Kyung; Kwak Jung-hye; Hwang Seongeoun | Kazakhstan; Olga Axenova; Irina Yunusmetova; Saule Alimbek |
| 2 | (Egypt) Cairo | No event | | |
| 3 | (India) Bhopal | No event | | |
| 4 | (Peru) Lima | No event | | |
| 5 | (Azerbaijan) Baku | No event | | |
| 6 | (Brazil) Rio de Janeiro | No event | | |

=== Mixed team ===
10m Air Pistol
| Stage | Venue | 1st place, gold medalist(s) | 2nd place, silver medalist(s) | 3rd place, bronze medalist(s) |
|---|---|---|---|---|
| 1 | (Indonesia) Jakarta | Indonesia; Arista Putri Darmoyo; Muhamad Iqbal Prabowa | South Korea; Oh Min-kyung; Kim Mo-se | Austria; Sylvia Steiner; Richard Zechmeister; Kazakhstan; Irina Yunusmetova; Valeriy Rakhimzhan |
| 2 | (Egypt) Cairo | India; Rhythm Sangwan; Varun Tomar | Serbia; Zorana Arunović; Damir Mikec | Germany; Sandra Reitz; Robin Walter |
| 3 | (India) Bhopal | China; Wei Qian; Jinyao Liu | India; Varun Tomar; Rhythm Sangwan | China; Xue Li; Pengqi Hu |
| 4 | (Peru) Lima | Serbia; Zorana Arunović; Damir Mikec | China; Jiang Ranxin; Zhang Bowen | China; Zhao Nan; Hu Kai |
| 5 | (Azerbaijan) Baku | India; Sarabjot Singh; Divya Thadigol Subbaraju | Serbia; Zorana Arunović; Damir Mikec | Turkey; Şimal Yılmaz; Ismail Keleş |
| 6 | (Brazil) Rio de Janeiro | Serbia; Zorana Arunović; Damir Mikec | China; Wei Qian; Bu Shuaihang | Italy; Maria Varricchio; Paolo Monna |

==== Medal table ====
| Rank | Nation | Gold | Silver | Bronze | Total |
|---|---|---|---|---|---|
| 1 | China (CHN) | 9 | 9 | 9 | 27 |
| 2 | Germany (GER) | 3 | 3 | 5 | 11 |
| 3 | Serbia (SRB) | 3 | 2 | 0 | 5 |
| 4 | India (IND) | 3 | 1 | 6 | 10 |
| 5 | Hungary (HUN) | 3 | 0 | 0 | 3 |
| 6 | France (FRA) | 2 | 3 | 0 | 5 |
| 7 | South Korea (KOR) | 2 | 2 | 3 | 7 |
| 8 | Italy (ITA) | 2 | 2 | 1 | 5 |
| 9 | Turkey (TUR) | 1 | 2 | 2 | 5 |
| 10 | Kazakhstan (KAZ) | 1 | 1 | 2 | 4 |
| 11 | Austria (AUT) | 1 | 1 | 1 | 3 |
| 11 | Singapore (SGP) | 1 | 1 | 1 | 3 |
| 13 | Iran (IRI) | 1 | 1 | 0 | 2 |
| 13 | Uzbekistan (UZB) | 1 | 1 | 0 | 2 |
| 15 | Indonesia (INA) | 1 | 0 | 2 | 3 |
| 16 | Greece (GRE) | 1 | 0 | 1 | 2 |
| 16 | Slovakia (SVK) | 1 | 0 | 1 | 2 |
| 18 | Armenia (ARM) | 1 | 0 | 0 | 1 |
| 19 | Ukraine (UKR) | 0 | 3 | 0 | 3 |
| 20 | Azerbaijan (AZE) | 0 | 1 | 1 | 2 |
| 20 | Latvia (LAT) | 0 | 1 | 1 | 2 |
| 20 | Poland (POL) | 0 | 1 | 1 | 2 |
| 23 | Australia (AUS) | 0 | 1 | 0 | 1 |
| 23 | Czech Republic (CZE) | 0 | 1 | 0 | 1 |
| 25 | Chinese Taipei (TPE) | 0 | 0 | 1 | 1 |
| Totals (25 entries) | | 37 | 37 | 38 | 112 |

== Shotgun events ==
=== Men's individual ===
Trap
| Stage | Venue | 1st place, gold medalist(s) | 2nd place, silver medalist(s) | 3rd place, bronze medalist(s) |
|---|---|---|---|---|
| 1 | (Morocco) Rabat | Matthew Coward-Holley (GBR) | David Kostelecký (CZE) | Joao Azevedo (POR) |
| 2 | (Qatar) Doha | Oguzhan Tuzun (TUR) | Matthew Coward-Holley (GBR) | Prithviraj Tondaiman (IND) |
| 3 | (Cyprus) Larnaca | Anton Glasnović (CRO) | Andreas Makri (CYP) | Abdel Aziz Mehelba (EGY) |
| 4 | (Egypt) Cairo | Jiri Liptak (CZE) | Massimo Fabbrizi (ITA) | James Willett (AUS) |
| 5 | (Kazakhstan) Almaty | Massimo Fabbrizi (ITA) | James Willett (AUS) | Khaled Almudhaf (KWT) |
| 6 | (Italy) Lonato | Nathan Hales (GBR) | Ying Qi (CHN) | Prithviraj Tondaiman (IND) |
| Final | (Qatar) Doha | Abdel Aziz Mehelba (EGY) | Daniele Resca (ITA) | Nathan Hales (GBR) |

Skeet
| Stage | Venue | 1st place, gold medalist(s) | 2nd place, silver medalist(s) | 3rd place, bronze medalist(s) |
|---|---|---|---|---|
| 1 | (Morocco) Rabat | Nikolaos Mavrommatis (GRE) | Azmy Mehelba (EGY) | Valerio Palmucci (ITA) |
| 2 | (Qatar) Doha | Gabriele Rossetti (ITA) | Vincent Hancock (USA) | Luigi Lodde (ITA) |
| 3 | (Cyprus) Larnaca | Erik Pittini (ITA) | Eetu Kallioinen (FIN) | Sven Korte (GER) |
| 4 | (Egypt) Cairo | Gabriele Rossetti (ITA) | Elia Sdruccioli (ITA) | Jesper Hansen (DEN) |
| 5 | (Kazakhstan) Almaty | Efthimios Mitas (GRE) | Georgios Achilleos (CYP) | Giancarlo Tazza (ITA) |
| 6 | (Italy) Lonato | Jesper Hansen (DEN) | Tammaro Cassandro (ITA) | Eetu Kallioinen (FIN) |
| Final | (Qatar) Doha | Emil Kjelgaard Petersen (DEN) | Azmy Mehelba (EGY) | Elia Sdruccioli (ITA) |

=== Men's team ===
Trap
| Stage | Venue | 1st place, gold medalist(s) | 2nd place, silver medalist(s) | 3rd place, bronze medalist(s) |
|---|---|---|---|---|
| 1 | (Morocco) Rabat | Croatia; Giovanni Cernogoraz; Josip Glasnovic; Anton Glasnovic | Portugal; Joao Azevedo; Jose Manuel Bruno Faria; Armelim Filipe Rodrigues | United States; Derek Haldeman; William Hinton; Derrick Scott Mein |
| 2 | (Qatar) Doha | No event | | |
| 3 | (Cyprus) Larnaca | No event | | |
| 4 | (Egypt) Cairo | No event | | |
| 5 | (Kazakhstan) Almaty | No event | | |
| 6 | (Italy) Lonato | No event | | |

Skeet
| Stage | Venue | 1st place, gold medalist(s) | 2nd place, silver medalist(s) | 3rd place, bronze medalist(s) |
|---|---|---|---|---|
| 1 | (Morocco) Rabat | United States; Christian Elliott; Conner Lynn Prince; Dustan Taylor | Kuwait; Mohammad Aldaihani; Abdulazis Alsaad; Mansour Al Rashedi | Azerbaijan; Fuad Gurbanov; Javid Hasanov; Emin Jafarov |
| 2 | (Qatar) Doha | No event | | |
| 3 | (Cyprus) Larnaca | No event | | |
| 4 | (Egypt) Cairo | No event | | |
| 5 | (Kazakhstan) Almaty | No event | | |
| 6 | (Italy) Lonato | No event | | |

=== Women's individual ===
Trap
| Stage | Venue | 1st place, gold medalist(s) | 2nd place, silver medalist(s) | 3rd place, bronze medalist(s) |
|---|---|---|---|---|
| 1 | (Morocco) Rabat | Mar Molné Magriñà (SPA) | Safiye Temizdemir (TUR) | Rachel Tozier (USA) |
| 2 | (Qatar) Doha | Penny Smith (AUS) | Zuzana Rehák-Štefečeková (SVK) | Alicia Kathleen Gough (USA) |
| 3 | (Cyprus) Larnaca | Lucy Hall (GBR) | Wu Cuicui (CHN) | Penny Smith (AUS) |
| 4 | (Egypt) Cairo | Maria Coelho de Barros (POR) | Lin Yi-chun (TPE) | Wang Xiaojing (CHN) |
| 5 | (Kazakhstan) Almaty | Mar Molné Magriñà (SPA) | Fátima Gálvez (SPA) | Catherine Skinner (AUS) |
| 6 | (Italy) Lonato | Laetisha Scanlan (AUS) | Fátima Gálvez (SPA) | Rümeysa Pelin Kaya (TUR) |
| Final | (Qatar) Doha | Silvana Stanco (ITA) | Fátima Gálvez (SPA) | Jessica Rossi (ITA) |

Skeet
| Stage | Venue | 1st place, gold medalist(s) | 2nd place, silver medalist(s) | 3rd place, bronze medalist(s) |
|---|---|---|---|---|
| 1 | (Morocco) Rabat | Kimberly Rhode (USA) | Emmanouela Katzouraki (GRE) | Konstantia Nikolaou (CYP) |
| 2 | (Qatar) Doha | Kimberly Rhode (USA) | Samantha Simonton (USA) | Simona Scocchetti (ITA) |
| 3 | (Cyprus) Larnaca | Danka Barteková (SVK) | Gao Jinmei (CHN) | Francisca Crovetto (CHI) |
| 4 | (Egypt) Cairo | Jiang Yiting (CHN) | Simona Scocchetti (ITA) | Nadine Messerschmidt (GER) |
| 5 | (Kazakhstan) Almaty | Assem Orynbay (KAZ) | Ganemat Sekhon (IND) | Darshna Rathore (IND) |
| 6 | (Italy) Lonato | Dania Vizzi (USA) | Samantha Simonton (USA) | Jiang Yiting (CHN) |
| Final | (Qatar) Doha | Assem Orynbay (KAZ) | Chiara Di Marziantonio (ITA) | Dania Vizzi (USA) |

=== Women's Team ===
Trap
| Stage | Venue | 1st place, gold medalist(s) | 2nd place, silver medalist(s) | 3rd place, bronze medalist(s) |
|---|---|---|---|---|
| 1 | (Morocco) Rabat | United States; Julia Nicole Stallings; Aeriel Alease Skinner; Rachel Leighannee Tozier | Kazakhstan; Mariya Dmitriyenko; Aizhan Dosmagambetova; Anastassiya Prilepina | Kuwait; Hajar Abdulmalik; Sarah Alhawal; Shahad Alhawal |
| 2 | (Qatar) Doha | No event | | |
| 3 | (Cyprus) Larnaca | No event | | |
| 4 | (Egypt) Cairo | No event | | |
| 5 | (Kazakhstan) Almaty | No event | | |
| 6 | (Italy) Lonato | No event | | |

Skeet
| Stage | Venue | 1st place, gold medalist(s) | 2nd place, silver medalist(s) | 3rd place, bronze medalist(s) |
|---|---|---|---|---|
| 1 | (Morocco) Rabat | Kazakhstan; Zoya Kravchenko; Assem Orynbay; Adel Sadakbayeva | United States; Katharina Monika Jacob; Kimberly Rhode; Dania Joo Vizzi | Bahrain; Latifa Alnajem; Maryam Alasam; Maryam Hassani |
| 2 | (Qatar) Doha | No event | | |
| 3 | (Cyprus) Larnaca | No event | | |
| 4 | (Egypt) Cairo | No event | | |
| 5 | (Kazakhstan) Almaty | No event | | |
| 6 | (Italy) Lonato | No event | | |

=== Mixed Team ===
Trap
| Stage | Venue | 1st place, gold medalist(s) | 2nd place, silver medalist(s) | 3rd place, bronze medalist(s) |
|---|---|---|---|---|
| 1 | (Morocco) Rabat | United States; Rachel Tozier; Derrick Mein | Poland; Tomasz Pasierbski; Sandra Bernal | Portugal; Anna Rita Rodrigues; Armelim Filipe Rodrigues |
| 2 | (Qatar) Doha | United States; William Hinton; Alicia Kathleen Gough | Kuwait; Talal Al-Rashidi; Sarah Al-Hawal | Poland; Piotr Kowalczyk; Sandra Bernal |
| 3 | (Cyprus) Larnaca | Portugal; Joao Azevedo; Maria Ines Coelho De Barros | United States; Walton Eller; Alicia Kathleen Gough | Slovakia; Adrián Drobný; Zuzana Rehák-Štefečeková |
| 4 | (Egypt) Cairo | No event | | |
| 5 | (Kazakhstan) Almaty | Kazakhstan; Victor Khassyanov; Mariya Dmitriyenko | Turkey; Tolga Tuncer; Rümeysa Pelin Kaya | Iran; Mohammad Hossein Parvareshnia; Marziyeh Parvareshnia |
| 6 | (Italy) Lonato | No event | | |

Skeet
| Stage | Venue | 1st place, gold medalist(s) | 2nd place, silver medalist(s) | 3rd place, bronze medalist(s) |
|---|---|---|---|---|
| 1 | (Morocco) Rabat | United States; Katharina Monika Jacob; Conner Lynn Prince | United States; Dania Vizzi; Christian Elliott | Greece; Ioannis Gkogkolakis; Emmanouela Katzouraki |
| 2 | (Qatar) Doha | United States; Kimberly Rhode; Vincent Hancock | France; Lucie Anastassiou; Éric Delaunay | Italy; Diana Bacosi; Lodde Luigi |
| 3 | (Cyprus) Larnaca | Germany; Sven Korte; Nadine Messerschmidt | Cyprus; Petros Englezoudis; Anastasia Eleftheriou | Chile; Hector Flores; Francisca Crovetto |
| 4 | (Egypt) Cairo | India; Mairaj Ahmad Khan; Ganemat Sekhon | Mexico; Luis Raul Gallardo Oliveros; Gabriela Rodriguez | Italy; Simona Scocchetti; Gabriele Rossetti |
| 5 | (Kazakhstan) Almaty | Italy; Tammaro Cassandro; Chiara Cainero | Kazakhstan; Eduard Yechshenko; Assem Orynbay | Italy; Diana Bacosi; Gabriele Rossetti |
| 6 | (Italy) Lonato | United States; Austen Smith; Vincent Hancock | Chile; Hector Flores; Francisca Crovetto | Kazakhstan; Eduard Yechshenko; Assem Orynbay |

==== Medal table ====
| Rank | Nation | Gold | Silver | Bronze | Total |
|---|---|---|---|---|---|
| 1 | United States (USA) | 10 | 6 | 4 | 20 |
| 2 | Italy (ITA) | 6 | 6 | 9 | 21 |
| 3 | Kazakhstan (KAZ) | 4 | 2 | 1 | 7 |
| 4 | Great Britain (GBR) | 3 | 1 | 1 | 5 |
| 5 | Spain (SPA) | 2 | 3 | 0 | 5 |
| 6 | Australia (AUS) | 2 | 1 | 3 | 6 |
| 7 | Portugal (POR) | 2 | 1 | 2 | 5 |
| 8 | Greece (GRE) | 2 | 1 | 1 | 4 |
| 9 | Denmark (DEN) | 2 | 0 | 1 | 3 |
| 10 | Croatia (CRO) | 2 | 0 | 0 | 2 |
| 11 | China (CHN) | 1 | 3 | 2 | 6 |
| 12 | Egypt (EGY) | 1 | 2 | 1 | 4 |
| 12 | Turkey (TUR) | 1 | 2 | 1 | 4 |
| 14 | India (IND) | 1 | 1 | 3 | 5 |
| 15 | Slovakia (SVK) | 1 | 1 | 1 | 3 |
| 16 | Czech Republic (CZE) | 1 | 1 | 0 | 2 |
| 17 | Germany (GER) | 1 | 0 | 2 | 3 |
| 18 | Cyprus (CYP) | 0 | 3 | 1 | 4 |
| 19 | Kuwait (KUW) | 0 | 2 | 2 | 4 |
| 20 | Chile (CHI) | 0 | 1 | 2 | 3 |
| 21 | Finland (FIN) | 0 | 1 | 1 | 2 |
| 21 | Poland (POL) | 0 | 1 | 1 | 2 |
| 23 | Chinese Taipei (TPE) | 0 | 1 | 0 | 1 |
| 23 | France (FRA) | 0 | 1 | 0 | 1 |
| 23 | Mexico (MEX) | 0 | 1 | 0 | 1 |
| 26 | Azerbaijan (AZE) | 0 | 0 | 1 | 1 |
| 26 | Bahrain (BHR) | 0 | 0 | 1 | 1 |
| 26 | Iran (IRI) | 0 | 0 | 1 | 1 |
| Totals (28 entries) | | 42 | 42 | 42 | 126 |

== Overall Medal table ==
| Rank | Nation | Gold | Silver | Bronze | Total |
|---|---|---|---|---|---|
| 1 | China (CHN) | 20 | 17 | 14 | 51 |
| 2 | United States (USA) | 10 | 7 | 4 | 21 |
| 3 | Hungary (HUN) | 10 | 7 | 1 | 18 |
| 4 | Italy (ITA) | 9 | 8 | 10 | 27 |
| 5 | India (IND) | 8 | 5 | 13 | 26 |
| 6 | Kazakhstan (KAZ) | 7 | 7 | 5 | 19 |
| 7 | Germany (GER) | 5 | 5 | 10 | 20 |
| 8 | Great Britain (GBR) | 5 | 1 | 1 | 7 |
| 9 | Switzerland (SUI) | 4 | 4 | 2 | 10 |
| 10 | France (FRA) | 3 | 6 | 0 | 9 |
| 11 | Czech Republic (CZE) | 3 | 3 | 5 | 11 |
| 12 | Serbia (SRB) | 3 | 3 | 0 | 6 |
| 13 | Greece (GRE) | 3 | 1 | 2 | 6 |
| 13 | Slovakia (SVK) | 3 | 1 | 2 | 6 |
| 15 | Norway (NOR) | 2 | 4 | 6 | 12 |
| 16 | Turkey (TUR) | 2 | 4 | 3 | 9 |
| 17 | Austria (AUT) | 2 | 3 | 4 | 9 |
| 18 | Spain (SPA) | 2 | 3 | 0 | 5 |
| 19 | South Korea (KOR) | 2 | 2 | 4 | 8 |
| 20 | Australia (AUS) | 2 | 2 | 3 | 7 |
| 21 | Denmark (DEN) | 2 | 1 | 3 | 6 |
| 22 | Portugal (POR) | 2 | 1 | 2 | 5 |
| 23 | Indonesia (INA) | 2 | 0 | 4 | 6 |
| 24 | Croatia (CRO) | 2 | 0 | 1 | 3 |
| 25 | Poland (POL) | 1 | 3 | 5 | 9 |
| 26 | Egypt (EGY) | 1 | 2 | 1 | 4 |
| 26 | Singapore (SGP) | 1 | 2 | 1 | 4 |
| 28 | Iran (IRI) | 1 | 1 | 1 | 3 |
| 29 | Japan (JPN) | 1 | 1 | 0 | 2 |
| 29 | Uzbekistan (UZB) | 1 | 1 | 0 | 2 |
| 31 | Armenia (ARM) | 1 | 0 | 0 | 1 |
| 32 | Ukraine (UKR) | 0 | 4 | 0 | 4 |
| 33 | Cyprus (CYP) | 0 | 3 | 1 | 4 |
| 34 | Kuwait (KUW) | 0 | 2 | 2 | 4 |
| 35 | Azerbaijan (AZE) | 0 | 1 | 2 | 3 |
| 35 | Chile (CHI) | 0 | 1 | 2 | 3 |
| 37 | Chinese Taipei (TPE) | 0 | 1 | 1 | 2 |
| 37 | Finland (FIN) | 0 | 1 | 1 | 2 |
| 37 | Latvia (LAT) | 0 | 1 | 1 | 2 |
| 40 | Mexico (MEX) | 0 | 1 | 0 | 1 |
| 41 | Sweden (SWE) | 0 | 0 | 2 | 2 |
| 42 | Bahrain (BHR) | 0 | 0 | 1 | 1 |
| 42 | Israel (ISR) | 0 | 0 | 1 | 1 |
| 42 | Romania (ROU) | 0 | 0 | 1 | 1 |
| Totals (44 entries) | | 120 | 120 | 122 | 362 |
