= Shooting at the 2020 Summer Olympics – Women's 10 metre air rifle =

Olympic shooting event

Women's 10 metre air rifle at the Games of the XXXII Olympiad
- Olympic shooting pictogram
- Venue: Asaka Shooting Range
- Dates: 24 July 2021
- Competitors: 50 from 39 nations
- Winning score: 251.8

Medalists
1st place, gold medalist(s)		Yang Qian	China
2nd place, silver medalist(s)		Anastasiia Galashina	ROC
3rd place, bronze medalist(s)		Nina Christen	Switzerland

The women's 10 metre air rifle event at the 2020 Summer Olympics took place on 24 July 2021 at the Asaka Shooting Range.

== Records ==
Prior to this competition, the existing world and Olympic records were as follows.

Qualifying records
World record	Zhao Ruozhu (CHN)	634.0	New Delhi, India	23 February 2019
Olympic record	Not established	—	—	—

Final records
World record	Apurvi Chandela (IND)	252.9	New Delhi, India	23 February 2019
Olympic record	Not established	—	—	—

== Schedule ==
All times are Japan Standard Time (UTC+9)

Date	Time	Round
Saturday, 24 July 2021	10:45	Final

== Results ==
=== Qualification ===
Rank	Athlete	Country	1	2	3	4	5	6	Total	Notes
1	Jeanette Hegg Duestad	Norway	105.7	105.8	105.3	106.2	105.3	104.6	632.9	Q, OR
2	Park Hee-moon	South Korea	104.4	105.4	105.9	105.3	104.7	106.0	631.7	Q
3	Mary Tucker	United States	104.8	104.4	105.2	105.6	106.0	105.4	631.4	Q
4	Kwon Eun-ji	South Korea	105.8	105.3	104.7	104.3	105.5	105.3	630.9	Q
5	Océanne Muller	France	103.8	104.7	105.0	105.5	106.2	105.5	630.7	Q
6	Yang Qian	China	104.3	105.7	103.6	105.2	104.9	105.0	628.7	Q
7	Nina Christen	Switzerland	103.9	105.2	104.0	106.1	104.3	105.0	628.5	Q
8	Anastasiia Galashina	ROC	104.2	105.2	105.5	104.9	104.2	104.5	628.5	Q
9	Laura Ilie	Romania	104.8	103.3	105.0	105.1	104.1	105.7	628.0	
10	Sofia Ceccarello	Italy	104.5	104.9	105.2	104.8	106.4	101.5	627.3	
11	Živa Dvoršak	Slovenia	104.1	103.7	104.1	105.4	104.6	105.3	627.2	
12	Seonaid McIntosh	Great Britain	104.3	104.4	104.2	105.6	105.2	103.5	627.2	
13	Yulia Karimova	ROC	105.0	104.6	105.4	104.3	103.1	104.7	627.1	
14	Alison Weisz	United States	104.1	104.8	105.0	103.7	103.9	105.4	626.9	
15	Aneta Stankiewicz	Poland	104.1	105.6	104.2	105.7	104.5	102.7	626.8	
16	Elavenil Valarivan	India	104.3	104.0	106.0	104.2	103.5	104.5	626.5	
17	Jolyn Beer	Germany	104.6	103.4	103.8	104.4	104.3	105.3	625.8	
18	Wang Luyao	China	102.3	105.5	105.7	103.2	104.4	104.5	625.6	
19	Jenny Stene	Norway	104.9	103.8	104.4	104.4	104.2	103.8	625.5	
20	Eszter Mészáros	Hungary	102.5	103.5	104.9	105.5	104.2	104.7	625.3	
21	Adele Tan	Singapore	104.1	104.7	103.7	104.3	104.6	103.9	625.3	
22	Rikke Ibsen	Denmark	103.5	104.8	104.6	104.7	103.8	103.6	625.0	
23	Fatemeh Karamzadeh	Iran	102.7	103.8	105.7	104.0	104.5	104.2	624.9	
24	Maria Martynova	Belarus	104.2	102.8	103.1	105.5	104.0	104.7	624.3	
25	Oyuunbatyn Yesügen	Mongolia	103.0	103.8	104.9	103.3	103.9	105.1	624.0	
26	Lin Ying-shin	Chinese Taipei	104.8	103.8	103.0	104.3	102.9	104.6	623.4	
27	Jessie Kaps	Belgium	104.8	103.7	103.9	104.2	105.2	101.6	623.4	
28	Anna Nielsen	Denmark	104.1	104.8	103.3	104.1	103.1	103.9	623.3	
29	Andrea Arsović	Serbia	105.3	104.4	104.2	102.7	103.8	102.9	623.3	
30	Armina Sadeghian	Iran	104.9	103.8	104.3	102.0	102.5	105.1	622.6	
31	Snježana Pejčić	Croatia	104.6	102.5	103.3	103.2	104.7	104.3	622.6	
32	Haruka Nakaguchi	Japan	101.8	102.7	102.7	104.3	105.1	105.6	622.2	
33	Mukhtasar Tokhirova	Uzbekistan	103.4	104.6	102.6	102.8	104.6	104.2	622.2	
34	Shiori Hirata	Japan	104.4	103.7	102.9	103.1	102.5	105.5	622.1	
35	Vidya Rafika Toyyiba	Indonesia	104.3	103.6	104.6	102.5	103.7	103.3	622.0	
36	Apurvi Chandela	India	104.5	102.5	104.9	104.2	102.2	103.6	621.9	
37	Eglis Yaima Cruz	Cuba	104.5	102.4	103.2	103.6	103.8	103.0	620.5	
38	Alzahraa Shaban	Egypt	103.7	101.4	103.6	104.9	104.2	102.2	620.0	
39	Houda Chaabi	Algeria	103.7	103.2	101.6	103.6	103.9	103.5	619.5	
40	Fernanda Russo	Argentina	101.5	104.4	103.0	103.9	103.8	102.3	618.9	
41	Nikola Šarounová	Czech Republic	102.5	102.6	104.1	103.5	102.4	103.3	618.4	
42	Elise Collier	Australia	103.1	103.4	102.9	101.1	104.0	103.7	618.2	
43	Lenchu Kunzang	Bhutan	103.1	103.4	103.3	101.6	104.1	102.6	618.1	
44	Sanja Vukašinović	Serbia	103.3	103.2	103.8	103.7	101.7	102.1	617.8	
45	Katarina Kowplos	Australia	103.1	101.0	103.8	101.7	103.1	104.5	617.2	
46	Kalpana Pariyar	Nepal	102.2	105.4	101.0	104.1	103.4	100.7	616.8	
47	Tatjana Đekanović	Bosnia and Herzegovina	99.3	104.0	101.0	103.4	102.0	103.5	613.2	
48	Kanykei Kubanychebekova	Kyrgyzstan	103.4	101.0	103.0	102.5	101.1	101.8	612.8	
49	Tehani Egodawela	Sri Lanka	102.9	103.8	100.9	102.3	100.8	100.8	611.5	
50	Luna Solomon	Refugee Olympic Team	100.9	100.5	101.2	101.5	100.1	101.7	605.9	

=== Final ===
Rank	Athlete	Nation	5	10	12	14	16	18	20	22	24	Total	Notes
1st place, gold medalist(s)	Yang Qian	China	51.9	104.7	125.6	147.3	168.3	188.9	210.0	231.3	251.8	251.8	OR
2nd place, silver medalist(s)	Anastasia Galashina	ROC	52.5	104.4	126.0	146.2	167.6	189.1	210.5	231.4	251.1	251.1	
3rd place, bronze medalist(s)	Nina Christen	Switzerland	51.3	103.6	125.1	146.2	167.6	188.7	209.9	230.6	—	230.6	
4	Jeanette Hegg Duestad	Norway	52.1	104.4	125.6	146.6	167.1	188.5	209.3	—		209.3	
5	Océanne Muller	France	51.9	104.1	125.0	146.3	166.9	187.7	—			187.7	
6	Mary Tucker	United States	52.3	102.8	124.0	145.4*	166.0	—				166.0	
7	Kwon Eun-ji	South Korea	52.5	104.2	125.0	145.4*	—					145.4	
8	Park Hee-moon	South Korea	48.6	99.4	119.1	—						119.1	
