= Shooting at the 2026 Asian Games – Women's 50 metre rifle three positions team =

Women's 50 metre rifle 3 positions team at the 2026 Asian Games
- Venue: Aichi Pref. General Shooting Gallery
- Dates: 26 September 2026
- Competitors: 33 from 11 nations

Medalists
gold medal	China; Zhang Liyuan, Wang Zifei, Han Jiayu
silver medal	India; Tilottama Sen, Vidarsa Kochalumkal Vinod, Ashi Chouksey
bronze medal	Kazakhstan; Sofiya Shulzhenko, Arina Malinovskaya, Yelizaveta Bezrukova

The women's 50 metre rifle three positions team competition at the 2026 Asian Games in Aichi-Nagoya, Japan was held on 26 September 2026 at Aichi Pref. General Shooting Gallery. China won the gold medal, with India taking silver and Kazakhstan bronze.

== Schedule ==
All times are Japan Standard Time (UTC+09:00)

Date	Time	Event
Saturday, 26 September 2026	09:45	Final

== Records ==
Prior to this competition, the existing world, Asian and Games records were as follows.

World Record	United States	1774	Baku, Azerbaijan	21 August 2023
Asian Record	China	1773	Hangzhou, China	27 September 2023
Games Record	China	1773	Hangzhou, China	27 September 2023

== Results ==
Legend

- DNS — Did not start

Rank	Team	Kneeling		Prone		Standing		Total	Xs	Notes
Rank	Team	1	2	1	2	1	2	Total	Xs	Notes
1st place, gold medalist(s)	China (CHN)	295	295	299	296	293	295	1773	105	GR
	Zhang Liyuan	98	97	99	100	97	100	591	38	
	Wang Zifei	99	98	100	97	98	96	588	34	
	Han Jiayu	98	100	100	99	98	99	594	33	
2nd place, silver medalist(s)	India (IND)	293	293	298	298	288	293	1763	90	
	Tilottama Sen	98	99	98	100	97	98	590	32	
	Vidarsa Kochalumkal Vinod	97	96	100	99	98	98	588	29	
	Ashi Chouksey	98	98	100	99	93	97	585	29	
3rd place, bronze medalist(s)	Kazakhstan (KAZ)	295	292	295	296	284	292	1754	89	
	Sofiya Shulzhenko	98	98	98	98	94	99	585	31	
	Arina Malinovskaya	99	97	100	99	95	97	587	32	
	Yelizaveta Bezrukova	98	97	97	99	95	96	582	26	
4	Japan (JPN)	293	289	296	294	289	291	1752	81	
	Taichi Hinata	97	95	98	98	97	98	583	23	
	Nobata Misaki	99	96	99	100	97	97	588	32	
	Ai Horinouchi	97	98	99	96	95	96	581	26	
5	Iran (IRI)	288	291	295	296	292	287	1749	87	
	Najmeh Khedmati	98	98	97	100	100	94	587	28	
	Shermineh Chehel Amirani	98	97	98	98	95	97	583	31	
	Fatemeh Amini Pozveh	92	96	100	98	97	96	579	28	
6	South Korea (KOR)	288	293	295	296	289	288	1749	83	
	Oh Se-hee	94	96	97	99	97	97	580	25	
	Kim Ji-eun	96	100	99	99	96	98	588	28	
	Kim Bo-kyung	98	97	99	98	96	93	581	30	
7	Malaysia (MAS)	291	292	295	295	285	288	1746	86	
	Nur Suryani Taibi	96	96	98	100	93	93	576	22	
	Gan Chen Jie	99	99	99	97	96	97	587	37	
	Alia Husna Binti Budruddin	96	97	98	98	96	98	583	27	
8	Indonesia (INA)	284	292	296	298	287	287	1744	61	
	Vidya Rafika Rahmatan Toyyiba	93	98	98	100	97	97	583	24	
	Citra Dewi Resti	96	95	99	99	92	93	574	19	
	Audrey Zahra Dhiyaanisa	95	99	99	99	98	97	587	18	
9	Mongolia (MGL)	291	286	293	295	287	289	1741	76	
	Oyuunbatyn Yesügen	97	97	97	100	97	98	586	30	
	Olzvoibaataryn Yanjinlkham	98	94	98	96	93	95	574	20	
	Gankhuyag Nandinzaya	96	95	98	99	97	96	581	26	
10	Vietnam (VIE)	289	289	296	297	286	284	1741	61	
	Phí Thanh Thảo	98	93	97	100	93	93	574	18	
	Lê Thị Mộng Tuyền	97	98	99	98	98	95	585	20	
	Dương Hà My	94	98	100	99	95	96	582	23	
11	Thailand (THA)	291	292	290	297	284	284	1738	73	
	Ratchadaporn Plengsaengthong	96	99	97	100	96	99	587	24	
	Jayden Jitrawee Mohprasit	99	98	97	97	95	89	575	24	
	Thanyalak Chotphibunsin	96	95	96	100	93	96	576	25	
