= Varun Tomar =

Indian sport shooter

Personal information
- Born: 8 September 2003 (age 23) Baghpat, Uttar Pradesh, India
- Military career
- Branch: Indian Army
- Service years: 2023–present
- Rank: Naib Subedar

Sport
- Sport: Shooting
- Event: 10 m air pistol
Medal record
Men's 10 m air pistol shooting
Representing India
Event	1st	2nd	3rd
World Championships	1	0	1
Asian Championships	2	1	0
World Cup	1	1	2
Junior World Championships	1	0	1
Total	5	2	4
World Championships
Gold medal – first place	2025 Cairo	Team
Bronze medal – third place	2025 Cairo	Individual
Asian Championships
Gold medal – first place	2024 Jakarta	Individual
Gold medal – first place	2024 Jakarta	Team
Silver medal – second place	2026 New Delhi	Team
World Cup
Gold medal – first place	2023 Cairo	Mixed team
Silver medal – second place	2023 Bhopal	Mixed team
Bronze medal – third place	2023 Bhopal	Individual
Bronze medal – third place	2023 Cairo	Individual
Junior World Championships
Gold medal – first place	2022 Cairo	Team
Bronze medal – third place	2022 Cairo	Individual

Varun Tomar (born 8 September 2003) is an Indian sport shooter specializing in the 10 m air pistol event.

== Personal life ==
Tomar hails from Garhi Kangran village in Baghpat district, Uttar Pradesh. Inspired by his cousin Olympian Saurabh Chaudhary, he took up the sport in 2017 under coach Amit Sheoran at Benoli village. After his World Cup medals in 2023, he was selected for the National Centre of Excellence and trains at the Dr. Karni Singh Shooting Range in New Delhi. In 2023, he joined the Indian Army and was selected for the Army Marksmanship Unit. He is now trained under army coach Subedar Major Himmat Singh.

== Career ==
Tomar won a gold medal in the Air Pistol team and individual events at the Asian Olympic Qualifier in Jakarta. In 2022, he won a gold medal in the Air Pistol Junior men team event at the World Championship in Cairo. He also won a bronze in the Air Pistol Junior men event.

In 2023, he won one gold, one silver and two bronze in the 10m Air Pistol events at the Cairo and Bhopal World Cup events. He also took part in the Baku World Cup.

In 2024, he also took part in the World Cup events at Granada and Cairo in the 10m Air Pistol. In the same year, he also participated and won a gold at the Asian Championships at Jakarta. Later, he took part in the Asian Championships at Changwon. Olympic quota berth is earned for the country and the federation will decide the team after trials.
