= Wang Luyao =

Chinese sports shooter

Personal information
- Nationality: Chinese
- Born: 18 March 1998 (age 27); Wenzhou, China

Sport
- Sport: Sports shooting

Wang Luyao (Chinese: 王璐瑶; pinyin: Wáng Lùyáo; born 18 March 1998) is a Chinese sports shooter. She competed in the women's 10 metre air rifle event at the 2020 Summer Olympics.
