= Mar Molné =

Spanish sport shooter

Mar Molné Magriña (born 16 October 2001) is a Spanish athlete specializing in trap shooting. She is left-handed.

In 2023, Molné Magriña achieved significant success at the Shooting World Cup, securing victories in the individual trap events at both the Almaty and Rabat stages. She was part of the team that won the world championship in 2021 and earned the title of European champion in the individual event in 2019.

Molné qualified for the Paris 2024 Olympic Games through the Olympic ranking system. She went on to achieve a 4th place finish in the finals. She becomes the second Olympic shooter from Catalonia, following Eladi Vallduví from Reus, who competed in five consecutive Olympics from 1972 to 1988.
