= Zhang Qiongyue =

Chinese rifle shooter (born 2004)

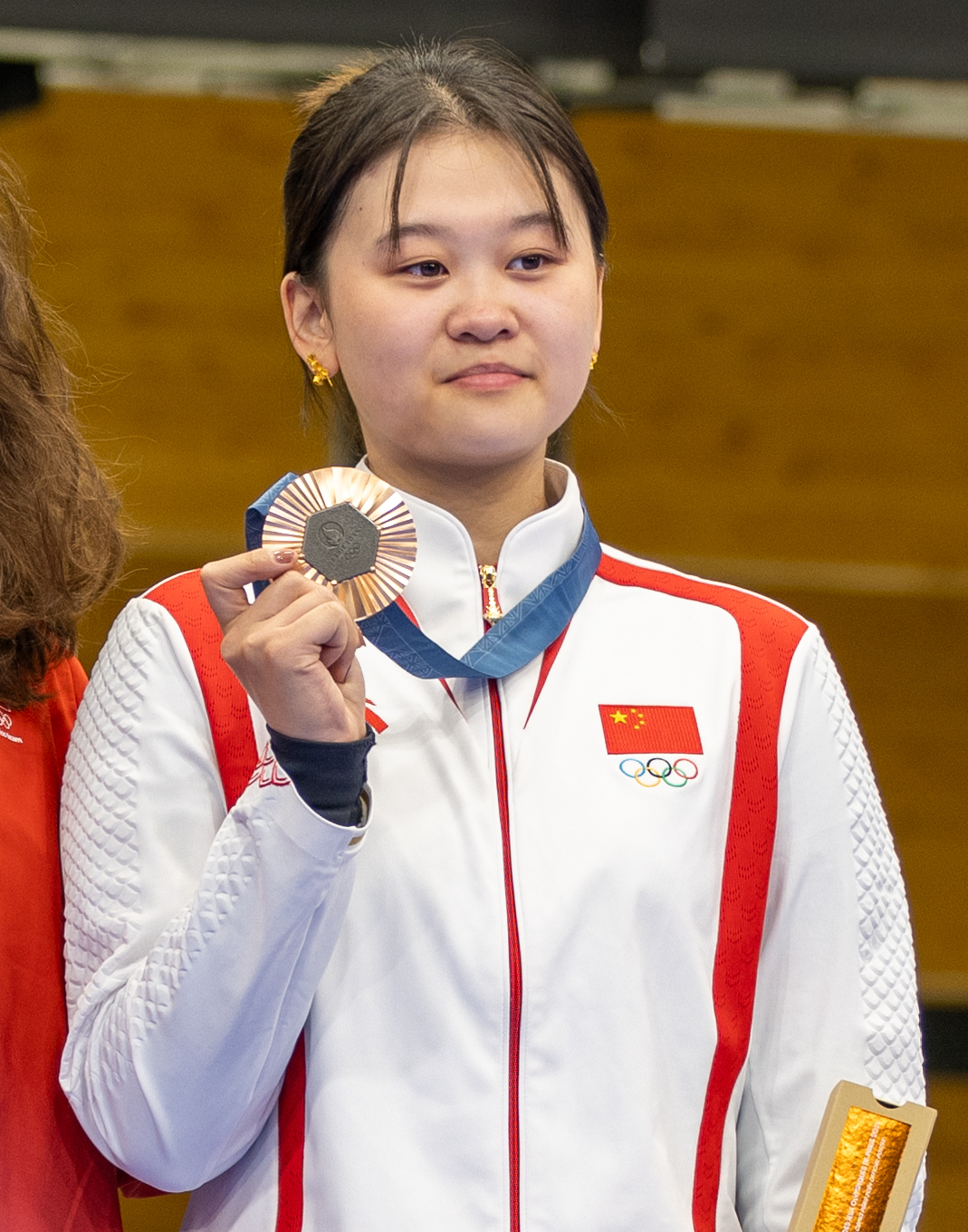
- Zhang with her bronze medal at the 2024 Summer Olympics

Personal information
- Native name: 张琼月
- Born: 12 March 2004 (age 22) Jilin City, China

Sport
- Country: China
- Sport: Sports shooting
Medal record
Women's shooting
Representing China
| Event | 1st | 2nd | 3rd |
|---|---|---|---|
| Olympic Games | 0 | 0 | 1 |
| World Championships | 1 | 0 | 1 |
| World Cup | 1 | 0 | 0 |
| Asian Games | 1 | 1 | 0 |
| Asian Championships | 0 | 1 | 0 |
| Total | 3 | 2 | 2 |
Olympic Games
| Bronze medal – third place | 2024 Paris | 50m rifle 3 positions |
World Championships
| Gold medal – first place | 2023 Baku | 50m rifle 3 positions |
| Bronze medal – third place | 2022 Cairo | 50m rifle 3 positions team |
World Cup
| Gold medal – first place | 2023 Bhopal | 50m rifle 3 positions |
Asian Games
| Gold medal – first place | 2022 Hangzhou | 50m rifle 3 positions team |
| Silver medal – second place | 2022 Hangzhou | 50m rifle 3 positions |
Asian Championships
| Silver medal – second place | 2023 Changwon | 50m rifle prone team |

Zhang Qiongyue (simplified Chinese: 张琼月; traditional Chinese: 張瓊月; pinyin: Zhāng Qióngyuè; born 12 March 2004) is a Chinese rifle shooter. She set a joint-Olympic record in qualifying with American Sagen Maddalena in the women's 50 metre rifle three positions event at the 2024 Summer Olympics, where she won a bronze medal. She also won a gold and a bronze medal at the World Shooting Championships and other medals at other international and continental games.

== Biography ==
Zhang was born in Jilin.
