= Park Hee-moon =

South Korean sport shooter

Personal information
- Nationality: South Korean
- Born: 4 January 2001 (age 25)

Sport
- Sport: Shooting

Park Hee-moon (Korean: 박희문; born 4 January 2001) is a South Korean sport shooter. She represented South Korea at the 2020 Summer Olympics in Tokyo 2021, competing in women's 10 metre air rifle.
