= Tilottama Sen =

Indian sport shooter

Personal information
- Born: 25 April 2008 (age 18) Bengaluru, India

Sport
- Country: India
- Sport: Shooting
- Event: 10 metre air rifle
Medal record
Women's shooting
Representing India
Asian Games
| Silver medal – second place | 2026 Aichi–Nagoya | 50 m rifle 3 positions team |
Asian Championships
| Silver medal – second place | 2023 Changwon | 10 m air rifle |
| Bronze medal – third place | 2023 Changwon | 10 m air rifle team |
World Cup
| Silver medal – second place | 2023 Cairo | 10m Air Rifle |
World Junior Championships
| Gold medal – first place | 2022 Cairo | 10m Air Rifle team |
| Bronze medal – third place | 2022 Cairo | 10m Air Rifle |

Tilottama Sen (born 25 April 2008) is an Indian sport shooter from Bangalore. In 2023, she won the silver medal in the women's 10m air rifle event at the Asian Shooting Championship at Changwon in South Korea, earning a quota place for the 2024 Summer Olympics in Paris.

She is the youngest Indian to win a quota for the Olympics. If selected to the Indian team, she would have been the third youngest Indian at Olympics in Paris but she finished fifth in the final selection trials on 17 May 2024 at Bhopal and failed to make it to the Olympics.

== Early life and education ==
Sen's family hails from Kolkata but are residents of Bengaluru. Her parents Sujit Sen and Nandita supported her to take up the sport. She is studying Class 9 at Bluebell Public School, Bangalore. She started with volleyball and karate but shifted to shooting later on inspired by Abhinav Bindra’s exploits at the Olympics. Initially, her father had to use his provident fund and retirement savings to buy her equipment. But soon she got support from the Reliance Foundation and TOPS programme. She practices at the Sports Authority of India (South Centre) at Kengeri in Bengaluru or at the Hawkeye Rifle Shooting Academy.

== Career ==
In 2024, she joined NCOE in Delhi and currently trains under Coach Manoj Kumar In the year 2020 To May 2023 she trained under Rakesh Manpat and was inspired by Apurvi Chandela. She was supported financially by Manpat for her first international tournament in Germany in 2022, when the government or state did not fund her international tournament later she shifted back to Hawkeye Sports Rifle and Pistol Shooting Academy & continuing her practice for 2024 Olympics in hawkeye .

She won gold medal at the World Championship in Cairo in the women's junior category in October 2022. In November 2022, she participated in the individual and team events at the Asian Airgun gold in Daegu, South Korea and won two gold medals.

In March 2023, she made her senior international debut winning a bronze in the ISSF World Cup at Cairo, Egypt, despite a technical issue with her rifle. But she missed the Asian Games selection trials.

At the 2023 Asian Shooting Championships in Changwon, Sen won silver in the 10m Air Rifle, earning India a quota place to the 2024 Summer Olympics in Paris. An Olympic berth is won for a country and the federation decides the final team after selection trials.

== Awards ==
- 2024: Sportstar Aces Awards 2024: Young Achiever of the Year (female).
