= Sift Kaur Samra =

Indian sport shooter

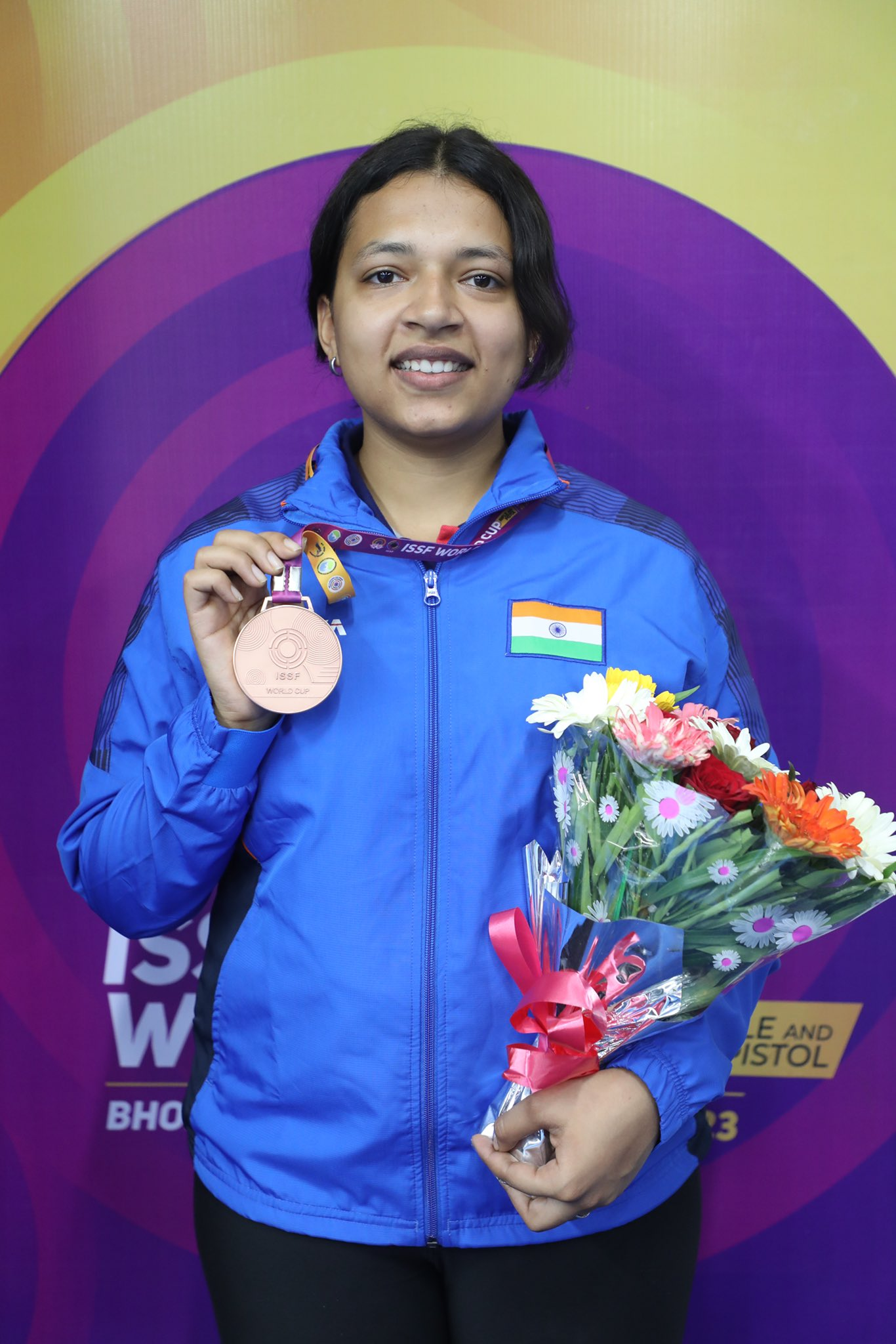
- Samra at the 2023 World Cup in Bhopal

Personal information
- Nationality: Indian
- Born: 9 September 2001 (age 25) Faridkot, Punjab, India
- Education: Bachelor of Physical Education; Guru Nanak Dev University

Sport
- Sport: Shooting
- Event: 50 m rifle 3 positions

Achievements and titles
- Highest world ranking: 5
- Personal bests: 469.6 WR AGR (2023); 594 AGR (2023)
Medal record
Women's 50 m rifle 3 positions
Representing India
Event	1st	2nd	3rd
World Cup	1	0	4
Asian Games	1	1	0
Asian Championships	3	1	0
World University Games	2	0
World University Championships	0	1	0
Junior World Cup	1	2	1
Total	8	5	5
World Cup
Gold medal – first place	2025 Buenos Aires	Individual
Bronze medal – third place	2022 Changwon	Team
Bronze medal – third place	2023 Bhopal	Individual
Bronze medal – third place	2024 Munich	Individual
Bronze medal – third place	2025 Munich	Individual
Asian Games
Gold medal – first place	2022 Hangzhou	Individual
Silver medal – second place	2022 Hangzhou	Team
Asian Championships
Gold medal – first place	2024 Jakarta	Team
Gold medal – first place	2025 Shymkent	Individual
Gold medal – first place	2025 Shymkent	Team
Gold medal – first place	2026 New Delhi	Team
Silver medal – second place	2024 Jakarta	Individual
Bronze medal – third place	2026 New Delhi	Individual Prone
World University Games
Gold medal – first place	2021 Chengdu	Individual
Gold medal – first place	2021 Chengdu	Team
World University Championships
Silver medal – second place	2024 New Delhi	Team
Junior World Cup
Gold medal – first place	2022 Suhl	Individual
Silver medal – second place	2022 Suhl	Mixed Team
Silver medal – second place	2022 Suhl	Prone Mixed Team
Bronze medal – third place	2022 Suhl	Team

Sift Kaur Samra (born 9 September 2001) is an Indian sports shooter. She holds the world record in the women's 50 m rifle three positions event, achieved while winning the gold medal in the event at the 2022 Asian Games. She has also represented India at the 2024 Paris Olympics in the women's 50 m rifle three positions event.

== Early life ==
Samra was born into an agricultural family engaged in the rice trade. She was first introduced to shooting by her cousin, Sekhon, who was a shotgun shooter. At the age of nine, she first had the taste of shooting at a shooting range in Punjab. She initially enrolled in the MBBS programme at Guru Gobind Singh Medical College, but later discontinued it to focus on shooting. She later pursued a Bachelor of Physical Education at Guru Nanak Dev University, alongside her sporting career.

== Career ==
2023: In September, Sift broke the world record held by Britain's Seonaid McIntosh, by a margin of 2.6 points.Samra scored a total of 469.6 points, 154.6 in kneeling, 157.9 in prone and 157.1 in standing elimination to beat Qiongyue Zhang of China.

During the 2022 Asian Games held in Hangzhou, China, she won the individual gold medal in the Women's 3P category while also breaking the world record. She also bagged the team silver medal along with teammates Ashi Chouksey and Manini Kaushik.

She bagged five medals at the Junior World Cup.

2022: She won a gold medal in the National Games.

She won a bronze on debut at the ISSF World Cup in the 50m rifle 3P.
