= Vidya Rafika Toyyiba =

Indonesian sport shooter (born 2001)

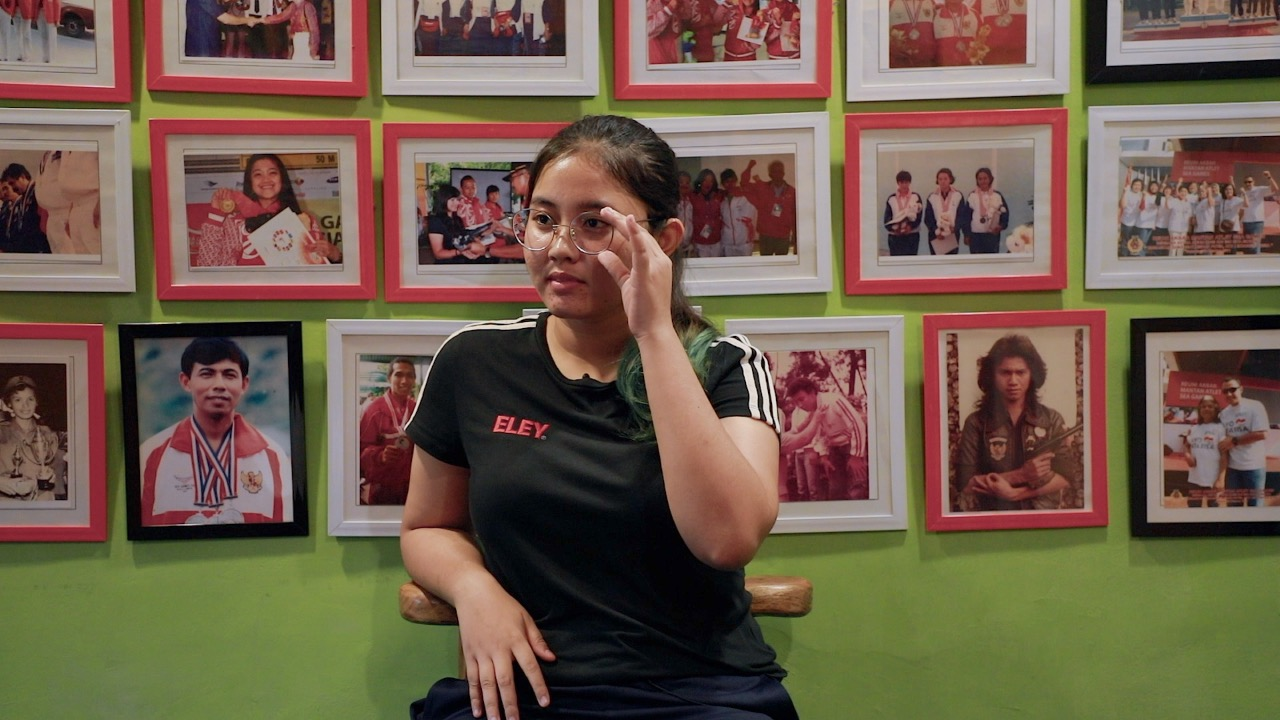

Personal information
- Full name: Vidya Rafika Rahmatan Toyyiba
- Born: 27 May 2001 (age 25) Depok, Indonesia

Sport
- Country: Indonesia
- Sport: Shooting
- Event: Rifle
Medal record
Women's shooting
Representing Indonesia
ISSF World Cup
Bronze medal – third place	2021 New Delhi	50 m rifle 3 positions team
Bronze medal – third place	2023 Jakarta	50 m rifle 3 positions team
Asian Airgun Championships
Gold medal – first place	2021 Shymkent	10 m air rifle team
SEA Games
Gold medal – first place	2019 Philippines	10 m air rifle
Gold medal – first place	2019 Philippines	10 m air rifle Mixed team
- Updated on 5 February 2023

Vidya Rafika Rahmatan Toyyiba (born 27 May 2001) is an Indonesian rifle shooter. She won two gold medal at the 2019 Southeast Asian Games in the Philippines. She was the first Indonesian shooter to qualify for the 2020 Summer Olympics in Tokyo, where she came in 37th out of 37 competitors in the Women's 50 metre rifle three positions.
