= Ashi Chouksey =

Indian sport shooter (born 2002)

Personal information
- Born: 7 March 2002 (age 24) Bhopal, Madhya Pradesh, India
- Education: Bachelor of Physical Education; Guru Nanak Dev University
- Height: 1.68 m (5 ft 6 in)

Sport
- Sport: Shooting
- Events: 50 m rifle 3 positions 10 m air rifle
Medal record
Women's shooting
Representing India
Event	1st	2nd	3rd
World Cup	1	0	1
Asian Games	0	1	2
Asian Championships	3	0	1
World University Games	1	1	0
Junior World Cup	0	0	2
Total	5	2	6
World Cup
Gold medal – first place	2022 Baku	50 m rifle 3 positions mixed team
Bronze medal – third place	2022 Changwon	50 m rifle 3 positions team
Asian Games
Silver medal – second place	2022 Hangzhou	10m air rifle team
Silver medal – second place	2026 Aichi–Nagoya	50 m rifle 3 positions team
Bronze medal – third place	2022 Hangzhou	50 m rifle 3 positions
Asian Championships
Gold medal – first place	2023 Changwon	50 m rifle 3 positions team
Gold medal – first place	2024 Jakarta	50 m rifle 3 positions team
Gold medal – first place	2025 Shymkent	50 m rifle 3 positions team
Bronze medal – third place	2024 Jakarta	50 m rifle 3 positions
World University Games
Gold medal – first place	2021 Chengdu	50 m rifle 3 positions team
Silver medal – second place	2021 Chengdu	50 m rifle 3 positions
Junior World Cup
Bronze medal – third place	2022 Suhl	50 m rifle 3 positions
Bronze medal – third place	2022 Suhl	50 m rifle 3 positions team

Ashi Chouksey (born 7 March 2002) is an Indian sport shooter, who competes in rifle events.

== Early life and education ==
Chouksey hails from Bhopal. She did her schooling at Carmel Convent, BHEL, Bhopal where she joined NCC in her Class 9. She learnt the basics of shooting at NCC. Later, she pursued a sports degree from the Guru Nanak Dev University. Her father Padam Kant Chouksey works in the Indian Railways. She started her formal training at the MP State Shooting Academy, Bhopal, under coaches Suma Shirur and Vaibhav Sharma.

== Career ==
In 2022, Chouksey won a gold medal in the mixed team event at the ISSF World Cup in Baku. In the same year, she also won a bronze in the team event in the ISSF World Cup in Changwon.

In the National shooting selections trials in 2024, she shot a world record score in the women’s 50-metre rifle 3-position event at the Madhya Pradesh Academy on 28 February 2024. She broke the world record of 596, jointly held by Jenny Stene of Norway and Sagen Maddalena of the USA, by scoring 597.

She is now an aspirant for the 2024 Paris Olympics
