= Wang Zhilin =

Chinese sports shooter

Personal information
- Nationality: Chinese
- Born: 16 January 2004 (age 22)

Sport
- Sport: Sports shooting
Medal record
Representing China
World Championships
Gold medal – first place	2022 Cairo	10 m air rifle team
Silver medal – second place	2023 Baku	10 m air rifle
Silver medal – second place	2023 Baku	10 m air rifle team
Asian Games
Gold medal – first place	2022 Hangzhou	10 m air rifle team
Asian Championships
Gold medal – first place	2023 Changwon	10 m air rifle team

Wang Zhilin (born 16 January 2004) is a Chinese sports shooter. She won a silver medal in 10 m air rifle at the 2023 ISSF World Shooting Championships, and then a gold medal in the 10 m air rifle team at the 2022 Asian Games.
