= Armina Sadeghian =

Iranian sport shooter

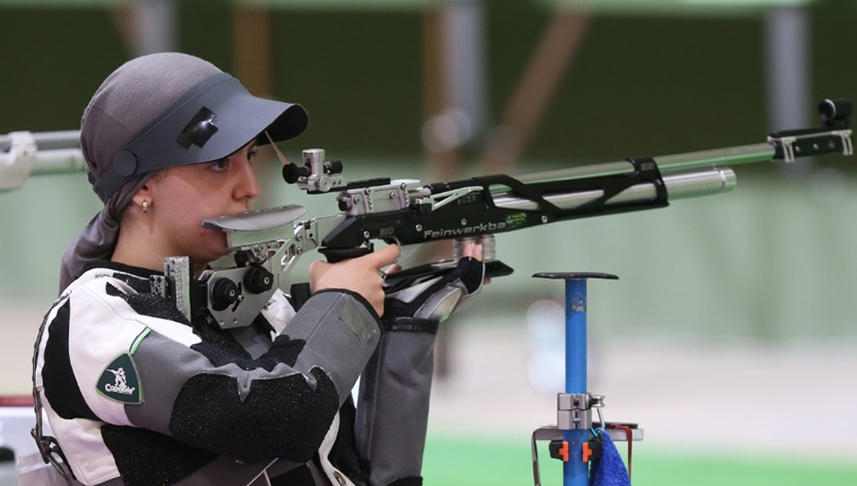
- Sadeghian at 2020 Summer Olympics in Tokyo

Personal information
- Full name: Armina Sadeghian
- Nationality: Iranian
- Born: 22 January 2002 (age 24) Ilam, Iran

Sport
- Sport: Shooting
- Coached by: Maryam Talebi (National Team)
Medal record
Representing Iran
World Cup
Bronze medal – third place	Munich 2017	10m air rifle individual
Gold medal – first place	Osijek 2021	10m air rifle team
World Championships
Bronze medal – third place	Cairo 2022	Rifle 3Position 50m individual Junior
Silver medal – second place	Changwon 2018	10m air rifle team Mix Junior
Junior World Cup
Gold medal – first place	Suhl 2019	10m air rifle team Mix
Asian Championships
Bronze medal – third place	Doha 2019	10m air rifle team Mix Junior
Bronze medal – third place	Doha 2019	10m air rifle team Junior
Silver medal – second place	Tehran 2016	10m air rifle individual Youth
Bronze medal – third place	Tehran 2016	10m air rifle team Youth
- Updated on 19 July 2022

Armina Sadeghian (Persian: آرمینا صادقیان; born 22 January 2002) is an Iranian sport shooter, born in Ilam. She represented Iran at the 2020 Summer Olympics in Tokyo 2021, competing in women's 10 metre air rifle.
