= Adele Tan =

Singaporean sports shooter

Personal information
- Native name: 陈芊秀
- Full name: Adele Tan Qian Xiu
- National team: Singapore Shooting Association
- Born: 31 March 1999 (age 27) Singapore
- Education: National University of Singapore
- Occupation: Shooter
- Years active: 14

Sport
- Sport: Sports shooting

Adele Tan
- Simplified Chinese: 陈芊秀
Transcriptions
Standard Mandarin
- Hanyu Pinyin: Chén Qiānxiù
- Wade–Giles: Chen^{2} Qian^{1} xiu^{4}

Adele Tan Qian Xiu OLY (born 31 March 1999) is a Singaporean Olympic shooter. She competed in the women's 10 metre air rifle event at the 2020 Summer Olympics.

== Sports career ==
Tan started practicing shooting at the age of 12 and was selected by the Singapore Sports School after she won a shooting competition.

In 2017, she finished fifth in the women's 10m air rifle at the Asian Shooting Championships in Wako, Japan. At the 2020 H&N Cup in Munich, she won a gold medal in women's 10m air rifle event scoring of 252.7 points and setting a new national record in the process.

In May 2021, the Singapore Shooting Federation announced that Tan would represent Singapore at the women's 10m air rifle at the 2020 Summer Olympics in Tokyo after an 18-month long Olympic Selection Trial where she emerged First. During the competition which was held on 24 July 2021 at the Asaka Shooting Range, she attained 21st position with a score of 625.3, making history by achieving Singapore's best finish in the Olympic Games.

In 2023, she graduated from the National University of Singapore.
