= Bae Sang-hee =

South Korean sport shooter (born 1992)

Personal information
- Nationality: South Korean
- Born: 1 February 1992 (age 34)
- Height: 1.60 m (5 ft 3 in)
- Weight: 50 kg (110 lb)

Sport
- Country: South Korea
- Sport: Shooting
- Event: Air rifle
Medal record
Women's shooting
Representing South Korea
World Championships
Silver medal – second place	2018 Changwon	300 m team rifle prone
Asian Games
Bronze medal – third place	2022 Hangzhou	50 m rifle 3 positions team
Asian Championships
Bronze medal – third place	2019 Doha	50 m rifle prone team
Bronze medal – third place	2023 Changwon	50 m rifle 3 positions team

Bae Sang-hee (born 1 February 1992) is a South Korean sport shooter.

She participated at the 2018 ISSF World Shooting Championships, winning a medal.
