= Ban Hyo-jin =

South Korean sport shooter (born 2007)

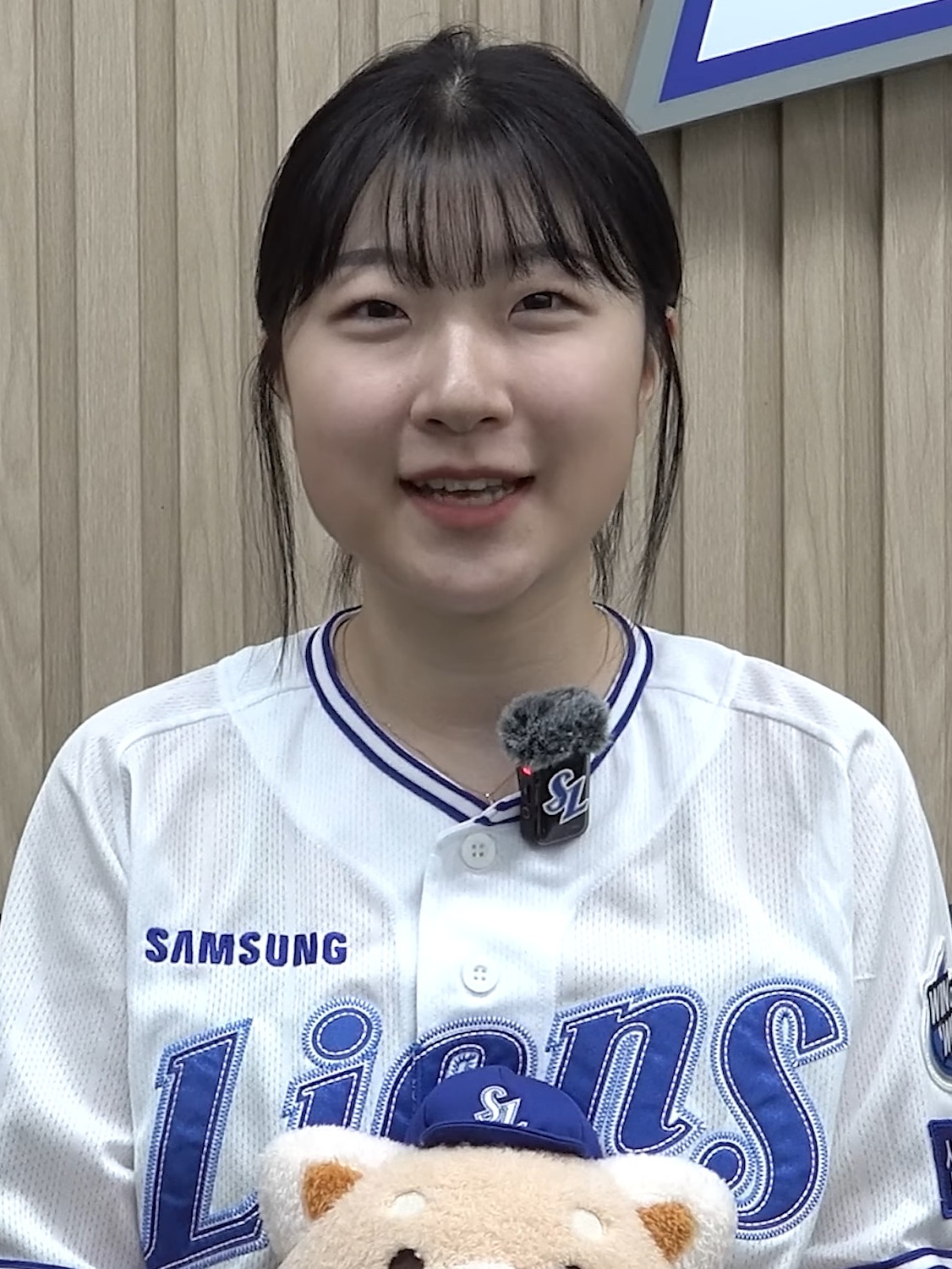
- Ban in 2024

Personal information
- Born: 20 September 2007 (age 19) Dong District, Daegu, South Korea
- Education: Daegu Physical Education High School
- Website: banhx1z__ on Instagram

Sport
- Sport: Sport shooting
- Event: 10 metre air rifle
Medal record
Women's Shooting
Representing South Korea
Olympic Games
Gold medal – first place	2024 Paris	10 metre air rifle
World Championships
Gold medal – first place	2025 Cairo	10 m air rifle
Gold medal – first place	2026 Doha	10 m air rifle
Silver medal – second place	2025 Cairo	10 m air rifle team
Bronze medal – third place	2026 Doha	10m Air Rifle Mixed
World Cup
Silver medal – second place	2024 Munich	10 metre air rifle
Asian Games
Silver medal – second place	2026 Aichi–Nagoya	10m air rifle mixed team
Bronze medal – third place	2026 Aichi-Nagoya	10 metre air rifle

Ban Hyo-jin (Korean: 반효진; born 20 September 2007) is a South Korean sport shooter. At the 2024 Summer Olympics, she set an Olympic record in the women's 10 metre air rifle qualification and won a gold medal.

== Early life ==
Ban was born in 2007. Growing up in Daegu, she attended Daegu Dongwon Middle School, but did not begin shooting until 2021, previously having participated in taekwondo. In July 2021, a friend suggested trying out for the school shooting team. She made the team and after two weeks, "realize[d] she did have some talent in shooting." She watched as the 2021 Tokyo Olympics took place, but according to YNA, "Not once did she think then she would be competing at an Olympic Games herself just three years later."

== Career ==
Two months after first trying out the sport, Ban won the gold medal at a tournament in Daegu. In April 2023, Ban, now attending Daegu Physical Education High School, won the silver medal at the national girls high school championships in the air rifle event. Later that year, she participated at the Asian Youth Shooting Championships and won silver in the team event. In 2024, Ban competed at the Korean Olympic trials, "just to gain some competition experience": according to YNA, "Her initial objective was to compete against some veteran shooters this year and then push for a spot on the national team for the 2025 season." However, she ended up winning the competition in a surprise, thus qualifying for the 2024 Summer Olympics in the mixed 10 metre air rifle and individual 10 metre air rifle events.

Ban became the youngest member of the 2024 South Korean Olympic team. Prior to the Olympics, she competed at the 2024 ISSF World Cup: although she finished 42nd in the Baku, Azerbaijan, tournament, she then participated in the Munich, Germany, tournament and won a silver medal in the individual 10 metre air rifle event. In the qualification round of the Olympics in the individual 10 m air rifle, Ban set the all-time Olympic record with a score of 634.5, securing her a place in the finals. In the final, she equaled the Olympic record and won a shoot-off to win gold.
