= Haruka Nakaguchi =

Japanese sports shooter

Personal information
- Native name: 中口 遥
- Nationality: Japanese
- Born: 13 January 1998 (age 28)

Sport
- Sport: Sports shooting

Haruka Nakaguchi (born 13 January 1998) is a Japanese sports shooter. She competed in the women's 10 metre air rifle event at the 2020 Summer Olympics.
