= Han Jiayu =

Chinese sport shooter (born 2001)

Personal information
- Nationality: Chinese
- Born: 24 December 2001 (age 24) Changxing County, Zhejiang, China

Sport
- Sport: Sports shooting
Medal record
Representing China
World Championships
Gold medal – first place	2023 Baku	10 m air rifle
Gold medal – first place	2025 Cairo	10 m air rifle team
Gold medal – first place	2025 Cairo	50 m rifle 3 positions team
Gold medal – first place	2026 Doha	10 m air rifle team
Silver medal – second place	2026 Doha	10 m air rifle
Asian Games
Gold medal – first place	2022 Hangzhou	10 m air rifle team
Gold medal – first place	2022 Hangzhou	50 m rifle 3 positions team
Silver medal – second place	2022 Hangzhou	10 m air rifle
Gold medal – first place	2026 Aichi–Nagoya	10m air rifle team
Gold medal – first place	2026 Aichi–Nagoya	50 m rifle 3 positions
Gold medal – first place	2026 Aichi–Nagoya	50 m rifle 3 positions team
Asian Championships
Gold medal – first place	2023 Changwon	10 m air rifle team
Gold medal – first place	2023 Changwon	10 m air rifle mixed team
Silver medal – second place	2023 Changwon	50 m rifle prone team
Silver medal – second place	2023 Changwon	50 m rifle 3 positions

Han Jiayu (born 24 December 2001) is a Chinese sports shooter. She won a gold medal in 10 m air rifle at the 2023 ISSF World Shooting Championships. Han clinched two golds and a silver medal at the 2022 Asian Games.
