= Shiori Hirata =

Japanese sports shooter

Personal information
- Nationality: Japanese
- Born: 6 November 1999 (age 26)

Sport
- Sport: Sports shooting
Medal record
Women's shooting
Representing Japan
Asian Games
Bronze medal – third place	2026 Aichi–Nagoya	10 m air rifle team
Asian Championships
Silver medal – second place	2025 Shymkent	50 m rifle 3 positions team
Bronze medal – third place	2019 Doha	50 m rifle 3 positions

Shiori Hirata (born 6 November 1999) is a Japanese sports shooter. She competed in the women's 10 metre air rifle event at the 2020 Summer Olympics.
