= Oyuunbatyn Yesügen =

Mongolian sports shooter (born 1999)

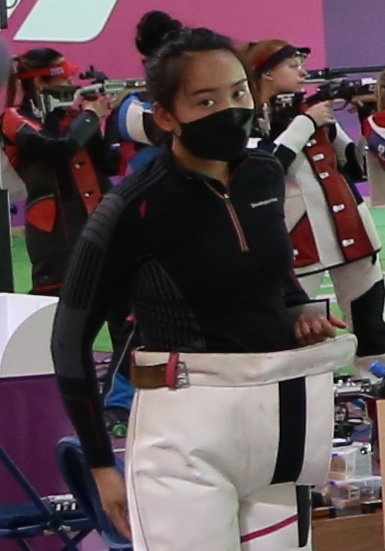
- Oyuunbatyn Yesügen at the 2020 Summer Olympics

Personal information
- Nationality: Mongolian
- Born: 20 June 1999 (age 27) Ulaanbaatar, Mongolia

Sport
- Sport: Sports shooting
Medal record
Women's shooting
Representing Mongolia
Asian Games
| Bronze medal – third place | 2022 Hangzhou | 10 m air rifle team |
Asian Championships
| Silver medal – second place | 2019 Doha | 50 m rifle 3 positions |

Oyuunbatyn Yesügen (Mongolian: Оюунбатын Есүгэн; born 20 June 1999) is a Mongolian sports shooter. She competed in the women's 10 metre air rifle event at the 2020 Summer Olympics.
