= 2024 European 25/50/300 m Events Championships =

- Dates: 20 May - 8 June
- Host city: Osijek, Croatia
- Level: Senior / Junior
- Participation: 1251 athletes from 51 nations

The 2024 European 25/50/300 m Events Championships was organised by the European Shooting Confederation and held in Croatian city of Osijek.

== Senior ==
=== Rifle events ===
==== Men's ====
Event	Gold	Silver	Bronze
Men's 50m Rifle 3 Positions	Jon-Hermann Hegg; Norway	Serhiy Kulish; Ukraine	Patrik Jány; Slovakia
Men's Team 50m Rifle 3 Positions	Norway; Jon-Hermann Hegg; Henrik Larsen; Ole Martin Halvorsen	France; Romain Aufrere; Lucas Kryzs; Michael d'Halluin	Austria; Andreas Thum; Alexander Schmirl; Patrick Diem
Men's Trio 50m Rifle 3 Positions	Czech Republic; Petr Nymburský; Filip Nepejchal; Jiří Přívratský	Slovakia; Štefan Šulek; Ondrej Holko; Patrik Jány	Serbia; Milenko Sebić; Milutin Stefanović; Marko Ivanović
Men's 50m Rifle Prone	Patrik Jány; Slovakia	Jon Thor Sigurdsson; Iceland	Jesper Johansson; Sweden
Men's Team 50m Rifle Prone	Slovakia; Patrik Jány; Štefan Šulek; Ondrej Holko	Czech Republic; Jiří Přívratský; Petr Nymburský; Filip Nepejchal	Norway; Jon-Hermann Hegg; Henrik Larsen; Ole Martin Halvorsen
Men's 300m Rifle 3 Positions	Péter Sidi; Romania	Bernhard Pickl; Austria	Gilles Dufaux; Switzerland
Men's Team 300m Rifle 3 Positions	Switzerland; Gilles Dufaux; Pascal Bachmann; Simon Maag	Austria; Bernhard Pickl; Patrick Diem; Tobias Mair	Finland; Sebastian Långström; Riku Koskela; Juho Autio
Men's Trio 300m Rifle 3 Positions	Switzerland; Pascal Bachmann; Gilles Dufaux; Simon Maag	Austria; Patrick Diem; Tobias Mair; Bernhard Pickl	Poland; Andrzej Burda; Rafał Łukaszyk; Daniel Romańczyk
Men's 300m Rifle Prone	Rajmond Debevec; Slovenia	Alexander Schmirl; Austria	Péter Sidi; Romania
Men's Team 300m Rifle Prone	Switzerland; Pascal Bachmann; Gilles Dufaux; Simon Maag	Austria; Alexander Schmirl; Bernhard Pickl; Patrick Diem	Sweden; Karl Olsson; Andreas Jansson; Johan Gustafsson

==== Women's ====
Event	Gold	Silver	Bronze
Women's 50m Rifle 3 Positions	Chiara Leone; Switzerland	Julia Piotrowska; Poland	Emely Jäggi; Switzerland
Women's Team 50m Rifle 3 Positions	Switzerland; Chiara Leone; Emely Jäggi; Nina Christen	Norway; Jeanette Hegg Duestad; Jenny Stene; Mari Bardseng Lovseth	Poland; Julia Piotrowska; Natalia Kochańska; Aleksandra Pietruk
Women's Trio 50m Rifle 3 Positions	Switzerland; Emely Jäggi; Nina Christen; Chiara Leone	Norway; Mari Bardseng Lovseth; Jenny Stene; Jeanette Hegg Duestad	Poland; Julia Piotrowska; Aleksandra Pietruk; Natalia Kochańska
Women's 50m Rifle Prone	Sára Karasová; Czech Republic	Darya Chuprys; Individual Neutral Athletes	Jenny Stene; Norway
Women's Team 50m Rifle Prone	Czech Republic; Sára Karasová; Veronika Blažíčková; Kateřina Štefánková	Norway; Jenny Stene; Jeanette Hegg Duestad; Mari Bardseng Lovseth	Switzerland; Chiara Leone; Anja Senti; Sarina Hitz
Women's 300m Rifle 3 Positions	Agathe Girard; France	Karolina Romańczyk; Poland	Katrine Lund; Norway
Women's Team 300m Rifle 3 Positions	Norway; Katrine Lund; Jenny Vatne; Oda Flikkerud	Switzerland; Silvia Guignard; Sarina Hitz; Anja Senti	Poland; Karolina Romańczyk; Sylwia Bogacka; Paula Wrońska
Women's Trio 300m Rifle 3 Positions	Norway; Oda Flikkerud; Katrine Lund; Jenny Vatne	Switzerland; Silvia Guignard; Sarina Hitz; Anja Senti	Estonia; Liudmila Kortshagina; Katrin Smirnova; Anzela Voronova
Women's 300m Rifle Prone	Charlotte Jakobsen; Denmark	Anzela Voronova; Estonia	Karina Kotkas; Estonia
Women's Team 300m Rifle Prone	Switzerland; Anja Senti; Sarina Hitz; Silvia Guignard	Estonia; Anzela Voronova; Karina Kotkas; Liudmila Kortshagina	Poland; Karolina Romańczyk; Paula Wrońska; Sylwia Bogacka

==== Mixed ====
Event	Gold	Silver	Bronze
Open 300m Standard Rifle	Bernhard Pickl; Austria	Silvia Guignard; Switzerland	Karl Olsson; Sweden
Duet 50m Rifle 3 Positions	Ukraine; Daria Dudka; Serhiy Kulish	Norway; Mari Bårdseng Løvseth; Henrik Larsen	Switzerland; Nina Christen; Christoph Dürr
Duet 50m Rifle Prone	Slovakia; Daniela Pešková; Ondrej Holko	Czech Republic; Veronika Blažíčková; Petr Nymburský	Slovakia; Miroslava Kyšeľová; Štefan Šulek
Duet 300m Rifle 3 Positions	Sweden; Elin Åhlin; Karl Olsson	Switzerland; Silvia Guignard; Pascal Bachmann	Austria; Jasmin Kitzbichler; Bernhard Pickl
Duet 300m Rifle Prone	Sweden; Elin Åhlin; Karl Olsson	Poland; Karolina Romańczyk; Daniel Romańczyk	Denmark; Charlotte Jakobsen; Carsten Brandt

=== Pistol events ===
==== Men's ====
Event	Gold	Silver	Bronze
Men's 25m Rapid Fire Pistol	Maksym Horodynets; Ukraine	Riccardo Mazzetti; Italy	Christian Reitz; Germany
Men's Team 25m Rapid Fire Pistol	Germany; Christian Reitz; Oliver Geis; Florian Peter	Ukraine; Maksym Horodynets; Volodymyr Pasternak; Pavlo Korostylov	Italy; Riccardo Mazzetti; Massimo Spinella; Andrea Morassut
Men's Trio 25m Rapid Fire Pistol	Germany; Oliver Geis; Florian Peter; Christian Reitz	Ukraine; Volodymyr Pasternak; Maksym Horodynets; Denys Kushnirov	Czech Republic; Matěj Rampula; Antonin Tupý; Tomáš Těhan

==== Women's ====
Event	Gold	Silver	Bronze
Women's 25m Pistol	Camille Jedrzejewski; France	Doreen Vennekamp; Germany	Aliaksandra Piatrova; Individual Neutral Athletes
Women's Team 25m Pistol	Germany; Josefin Eder; Doreen Vennekamp; Monika Karsch	France; Camille Jedrzejewski; Mathilde Lamolle; Héloïse Fourré	Hungary; Veronika Major; Miriam Jákó; Renáta Tobai-Sike
Women's Trio 25m Pistol	Germany; Josefin Eder; Doreen Vennekamp; Monika Karsch	Hungary; Veronika Major; Miriam Jákó; Renáta Tobai-Sike	Bulgaria; Antoaneta Kostadinova; Miroslava Mincheva; Lidia Nencheva

==== Mixed ====
Event	Gold	Silver	Bronze
Open 25m Center Fire Pistol	Martin Bolek; Slovakia	Ruslan Lunev; Azerbaijan	Tomáš Těhan; Czech Republic
Open 25m Standard Pistol	Kevin Chapon; France	Veronika Major; Hungary	Ruslan Lunev; Azerbaijan
Open 50m Pistol	Emīls Vasermanis; Latvia	Lauris Strautmanis; Latvia	Oleh Omelchuk; Ukraine
Duet 25m Rapid Fire Pistol	Ukraine; Yuliya Korostylova; Maksym Horodynets	Ukraine; Anastasiia Nimets; Volodymyr Pasternak	Bulgaria; Lidia Nencheva; Stoyan Pushkov

== Junior ==
=== Rifle events ===
==== Men's ====
Event	Gold	Silver	Bronze
Men's 50m Rifle 3 Positions	Michał Chojnowski; Poland	Wiktor Sajdak; Poland	Patrick Entner; Austria
Men's Team 50m Rifle 3 Positions	Poland; Wiktor Sajdak; Michal Chojnowski; Jakub Goliszek	Austria; Patrick Entner; Kevin Weiler; Kiano Waibel	Norway; Even Olai Enger Throndsen; Vebjørn Grimsrud; Jens Olsrud Östli
Men's Trio 50m Rifle 3 Positions	Norway; Jens Olsrud Östli; Even Olai Enger Throndsen; Vebjørn Grimsrud	Ukraine; Ivan Tkalenko; Oleksii Viatchin; Danylo Hrynyk	Germany; Alexander Karl; Justus Ott; Nils Palberg
Men's 50m Rifle Prone	Wiktor Sajdak; Poland	András Dénes; Hungary	Moritz Faltinat; Germany
Men's Team 50m Rifle Prone	Germany; Moritz Faltinat; Justus Ott; Alexander Karl	Hungary; András Dénes; Ferenc Török; Áron Rácz	Poland; Wiktor Sajdak; Jakub Goliszek; Michal Chojnowski

==== Women's ====
Event	Gold	Silver	Bronze
Women's 50m Rifle 3 Positions	Caroline Finnestad Lund; Norway	Hana Strakušek; Slovenia	Maja Magdalena Gawenda; Poland
Women's Team 50m Rifle 3 Positions	Germany; Hannah Wehren; Nele Stark; Anna Marie Beutler	Serbia; Emilija Ponjavić; Anja Knežević; Aleksandra Havran	Norway; Pernille Nor-Woll; Caroline Finnestad Lund; Martine Sve
Women's Trio 50m Rifle 3 Positions	Serbia; Aleksandra Havran; Anja Knežević; Emilija Ponjavić	Germany; Hannah Wehren; Nele Stark; Anna Marie Beutler	Norway; Pernille Nor-Woll; Caroline Finnestad Lund; Martine Sve
Women's 50m Rifle Prone	Hannah Wehren; Germany	Caroline Finnestad Lund; Norway	Martine Sve; Norway
Women's Team 50m Rifle Prone	Norway; Caroline Finnestad Lund; Martine Sve; Pernille Nor-Woll	Germany; Hannah Wehren; Nele Stark; Franziska Driessen	Estonia; Marleen Riisaar; Anastassia Olewicz; Susanna Sule

==== Mixed ====
Event	Gold	Silver	Bronze
Duet 50m Rifle 3 Positions	Germany; Hannah Wehren; Nils Palberg	Germany; Anna Marie Beutler; Justus Ott	Serbia; Aleksandra Havran; Aleksa Rakonjac
Duet 50m Rifle Prone	Norway; Pernille Nor-Woll; Jens Olsrud Östli	Poland; Wilhelmina Wośkowiak; Jakub Goliszek	Poland; Maja Magdalena Gawenda; Wiktor Sajdak

=== Pistol events ===
==== Men's ====
Event	Gold	Silver	Bronze
Men's 25m Rapid Fire Pistol	Matteo Mastrovalerio; Italy	Hervé-Louis Le Guellaff Dumas; France	Yan Chesnel; France
Men's Team 25m Rapid Fire Pistol	France; Yan Chesnel; Theo Moczko; Arnaud Gamaleri	Poland; Tomasz Jedraszczyk; Ivan Rakitski; Stanisław Franciszeh Nowosadko	Germany; Fiete Kühn; Leonhard Ernst Wolfgang Kunzlmann; Tim Krauzpaul
Men's Trio 25m Rapid Fire Pistol	Poland; Stanisław Franciszeh Nowosadko; Ivan Rakitski; Tomasz Jedraszczyk	Germany; Fiete Kühn; Leonhard Ernst Wolfgang Kunzlmann; Tim Krauzpaul	Ukraine; Vladyslav Medushevskyi; Oleksii Tsion; Timur Pidhornyi
Men's 25m Pistol	Wiktor Lukasz Kopiwoda; Poland	Matteo Mastrovalerio; Italy	Theo Moczko; France
Men's Team 25m Pistol	Poland; Wiktor Lukasz Kopiwoda; Tomasz Jedraszczyk; Ivan Rakitski	Czech Republic; Martin Cunda; Vaclav Škorpil; Filip Cupka	Italy; Matteo Mastrovalerio; Martino Gentilini; Luca Arrighi

==== Women's ====
Event	Gold	Silver	Bronze
Women's 25m Pistol	Alise Dvarišķe; Latvia	Alice Rocco; Italy	Alice Marie Ambrosini; Switzerland
Women's Team 25m Pistol	Croatia; Lana Špirelja; Anna Ćukušić; Marija Maglica	Ukraine; Viliena Bevz; Yuliia Didenko; Polina Zaichenko	Germany; Lydia Vetter; Franziska Thürmer; Ronja Gmeinder
Women's Trio 25m Pistol	Ukraine; Viliena Bevz; Yuliia Didenko; Polina Zaichenko	Croatia; Anna Ćukušić; Marija Maglica; Lana Špirelja	Norway; Ane Bjørkås Torgersen; Tiril Fredrikke Schüller; Emmeline Ekrem Bryhn

==== Mixed ====
Event	Gold	Silver	Bronze
Duet 25m Pistol	Ukraine; Viliena Bevz; Vladyslav Medushevskyi	Norway; Ane Bjørkås Torgersen; Hans Wang Nøstvold	Ukraine; Yuliia Didenko; Oleksii Tsion
Open 25m Standard Pistol	Theo Moczko; France	Martin Cunda; Czech Republic	Matteo Mastrovalerio; Italy
Open 50m Pistol	Matteo Mastrovalerio; Italy	Christian Sternbrink; Sweden	Maksym Kamminskyy; Ukraine

== Medal table ==
=== Total ===
* Host nation (Croatia)

Rank	Nation	Gold	Silver	Bronze	Total
1	Norway	8	6	8	22
2	Germany	8	5	5	18
3	Switzerland	7	4	5	16
4	Poland	6	6	8	20
5	Ukraine	5	6	4	15
6	France	5	3	2	10
7	Slovakia	4	1	2	7
8	Czech Republic	3	4	2	9
9	Italy	2	3	3	8
10	Sweden	2	1	3	6
11	Latvia	2	1	0	3
12	Austria	1	6	3	10
13	Serbia	1	1	2	4
14	Croatia*	1	1	0	2
14	Slovenia	1	1	0	2
16	Denmark	1	0	1	2
16	Romania	1	0	1	2
18	Hungary	0	4	1	5
19	Estonia	0	2	3	5
20	Azerbaijan	0	1	1	2
20	Individual Neutral Athletes	0	1	1	2
22	Iceland	0	1	0	1
23	Bulgaria	0	0	2	2
24	Finland	0	0	1	1
Totals (24 entries)		58	58	58	174

=== Seniors ===
* Host nation (Croatia)

Rank	Nation	Gold	Silver	Bronze	Total
1	Switzerland	7	4	4	15
2	Norway	4	4	3	11
3	Slovakia	4	1	2	7
4	Germany	4	1	1	6
5	Ukraine	3	4	1	8
6	Czech Republic	3	2	2	7
7	France	3	2	0	5
8	Sweden	2	0	3	5
9	Austria	1	5	2	8
10	Latvia	1	1	0	2
11	Denmark	1	0	1	2
11	Romania	1	0	1	2
13	Slovenia	1	0	0	1
14	Poland	0	3	5	8
15	Estonia	0	2	2	4
16	Hungary	0	2	1	3
17	Azerbaijan	0	1	1	2
17	Individual Neutral Athletes	0	1	1	2
17	Italy	0	1	1	2
20	Iceland	0	1	0	1
21	Bulgaria	0	0	2	2
22	Finland	0	0	1	1
22	Serbia	0	0	1	1
Totals (23 entries)		35	35	35	105

=== Juniors ===
* Host nation (Croatia)

Rank	Nation	Gold	Silver	Bronze	Total
1	Poland	6	3	3	12
2	Germany	4	4	4	12
3	Norway	4	2	5	11
4	Ukraine	2	2	3	7
5	Italy	2	2	2	6
6	France	2	1	2	5
7	Serbia	1	1	1	3
8	Croatia*	1	1	0	2
9	Latvia	1	0	0	1
10	Czech Republic	0	2	0	2
10	Hungary	0	2	0	2
12	Austria	0	1	1	2
13	Slovenia	0	1	0	1
13	Sweden	0	1	0	1
15	Estonia	0	0	1	1
15	Switzerland	0	0	1	1
Totals (16 entries)		23	23	23	69

== See also ==
- 2024 European 10 m Events Championships
- 2024 European Running Target Championships
- 2024 European Shotgun Championships
