= 2017 European Shooting Championships =

International sport shooting competition

- Dates: 21 July – 4 August
- Host city: Baku, Azerbaijan
- Level: Senior
- Events: 14 men + 8 women (individual); 14 men + 8 women + 3 mixed (team)

The 2017 European Shooting Championships was held in Baku, Azerbaijan from 21 July – 4 August 2017. 932 athletes from 43 countries contested 79 sets of medals in 25m, 50m, 300m, rifle and pistol, Shotgun and RT events. Qualification for the 2018 Youth Olympic Games also took place and included 10m events. The Championship was organised by the Azerbaijan Shooting Federation and the Youth and Sports Ministry.

== Events ==
- 83 (79 + 4) Events consist of (73 Medal Events) :
- Senior Events : 28 M (14 Individual + 14 Team) + 16 W (8 Individual + 8 Team) + 3 Mixed Team = 47 (Women's Double Trap and Women's Double Trap Team not counted in medal table) so 45 Medal Events.
- Junior Events : 22 M (11 Individual + 11 Team) + 10 W (5 Individual + 5 Team) = 32 (Men's Double Trap, Men's Double Trap Team, Men's 50m Running Target Team and Men's 50m Running Target Mixed Team not counted in medal table) so 28 Medal Events.
- 47 + 32 = 79 Events / 45 + 28 = 73 Medal Events
- Youth Events : 2 M + 2 W = 4 (not counted in medal table) 4 Youth Events not counted in medal table.
- 10 Events not counted in medal table (because of shortage of athletes or Youth Events).

In result, 47 Senior Events (45) + 32 Junior Events (28) + 4 Youth Events = 83 Events (73 in medal table)

== Results ==
=== Men's Senior events (28) ===
==== Pistol ====
Event	Gold	Silver	Bronze
25m Standard Pistol	Pavlo Korostylov (UKR)	Christian Reitz (GER)	Alexei Klimov (RUS)
25m Standard Pistol Team	Ukraine; Pavlo Korostylov; Volodymyr Pasternak; Roman Bondaruk	France; Clément Bessaguet; Franck Kiefer; Boris Artaud	Russia; Alexei Klimov; Nikita Sukhanov; Alexander Alifirenko
25m Rapid Fire Pistol	Nikita Sukhanov (RUS)	Peeter Olesk (EST)	Christian Reitz (GER)
25m Rapid Fire Pistol Team	Germany; Christian Reitz; Aaron Sauter; Oliver Geis	Russia; Nikita Sukhanov; Alexei Klimov; Alexander Alifirenko	Ukraine; Pavlo Korostylov; Volodymyr Pasternak; Denys Kushnirov
25m Center Fire Pistol	Yusuf Dikeç (TUR)	Christian Reitz (GER)	Peeter Olesk (EST)
25m Center Fire Pistol Team	Ukraine; Pavlo Korostylov; Roman Bondaruk; Volodymyr Pasternak	Germany; Christian Reitz; Pierre Michel; Michael Schleuter	France; Boris Artaud; Clément Bessaguet; Franck Kiefer
50m Pistol	Pavlo Korostylov (UKR)	Damir Mikec (SRB)	Lauris Strautmanis (LAT)
50m Pistol Team	Serbia; Dimitrije Grgić; Damir Mikec; Dusko Petrov	Ukraine; Pavlo Korostylov; Oleh Omelchuk; Viktor Bankin	Russia; Denis Koulakov; Nikolai Kilin; Vladimir Gontcharov

==== Rifle ====
Event	Gold	Silver	Bronze
50m Rifle Prone	Yury Shcherbatsevich (BLR)	Thomas Mathis (AUT)	Sergey Kamenskiy (RUS)
50m Rifle Prone Team	Belarus; Yury Shcherbatsevich; Vitali Bubnovich; Illia Charheika	Austria; Stefan Rumpler; Thomas Mathis; Alexander Schmirl	France; Valérian Sauveplane; Alexis Raynaud; Remi Moreno Flores
50m Rifle 3 Positions	Yury Shcherbatsevich (BLR)	Serhiy Kulish (UKR)	Alexander Schmirl (AUT)
50m Rifle 3 Positions Team	Belarus; Yury Shcherbatsevich; Vitali Bubnovich; Illia Charheika	Norway; Odd Arne Brekne; Øyvind Flatla; Simon Claussen	Germany; Michael Janker; Andre Link; Maximilian Dallinger

==== 300 m rifle ====
Event	Gold	Silver	Bronze
300m Standard Rifle	Bernhard Pickl (AUT)	Juho Kurki (FIN)	Karl Olsson (SWE)
300m Standard Rifle Team	Switzerland; Gilles Vincent Dufaux; Jan Lochbihler; Andrea Rossi	Austria; Bernhard Pickl; Gernot Rumpler; Alexander Schmirl	France; Valérian Sauveplane; Cyril Graff; Alexis Raynaud
300m Rifle Prone	Jan Lochbihler (SUI)	Frank Fleischmann (GER)	Rajmond Debevec (SLO)
300m Rifle Prone Team	France; Remi Moreno Flores; Cyril Graff; Valérian Sauveplane	Slovenia; Rajmond Debevec; Robert Markoja; Dusan Zisko	Germany; Frank Fleischmann; Matthias Raiber; Joerg Niehueser
300m Rifle 3 Positions	Alexis Raynaud (FRA)	Istvan Peni (HUN)	Péter Sidi (HUN)
300m Rifle 3 Positions Team	France; Alexis Raynaud; Valérian Sauveplane; Cyril Graff	Switzerland; Jan Lochbihler; Gilles Vincent Dufaux; Andrea Rossi	Austria; Gernot Rumpler; Bernhard Pickl; Stefan Rumpler

==== Shotgun ====
Event	Gold	Silver	Bronze
Skeet	Milos Slavicek (CZE)	Gabriele Rossetti (ITA)	Stefan Nilsson (SWE)
Skeet Team	Russia; Anton Astakhov; Alexander Zemlin; Nikolay Teplyy	Italy; Gabriele Rossetti; Riccardo Filippelli; Tammaro Cassandro	Sweden; Stefan Nilsson; Marcus Svensson; Henrik Jansson
Trap	David Kostelecký (CZE)	Josip Glasnović (CRO)	Giovanni Cernogoraz (CRO)
Trap Team	Portugal; João Azevedo; José Manuel Faria; José Silva	Croatia; Josip Glasnović; Giovanni Cernogoraz; Marko Germin	Czech Republic; David Kostelecký; Jiri Liptak; Vladimir Stepan
Double Trap	Vitaly Fokeev (RUS)	Hubert Andrzej Olejnik (SVK)	Vasily Mosin (RUS)
Double Trap Team	Italy; Daniele Di Spigno; Antonino Barillà; Marco Innocenti	Russia; Vitaly Fokeev; Vasily Mosin; Artem Nekrasov	Malta; William Chetcuti; Nathan Lee Xuereb; Matthew Grech

==== Running target ====
Event	Gold	Silver	Bronze
50m Running Target	Jesper Nyberg (SWE)	Emil Martinsson (SWE)	BEdrich Jonas (CZE)
50m Running Target Team	Sweden; Jesper Nyberg; Emil Martinsson; Rickard Johansson	Russia; Mikhail Azarenko; Maxim Stepanov; Dmitry Romanov	Finland; Topi Hulkkonen; Heikki Lahdekorpi; Tomi-Pekka Heikkila
50m Running Target Mixed	Emil Martinsson (SWE)	Mikhail Azarenko (RUS)	Topi Hulkkonen (FIN)
50m Running Target Mixed Team	Russia; Mikhail Azarenko; Maxim Stepanov; Dmitry Romanov	Sweden; Jesper Nyberg; Emil Martinsson; Rickard Johansson	Finland; Topi Hulkkonen; Heikki Lahdekorpi; Tomi-Pekka Heikkila

=== Women's Senior events (16) ===
==== Pistol ====
Event	Gold	Silver	Bronze
25m Pistol	Monika Karsch (GER)	Klaudia Bres (POL)	Maria Grozdeva (BUL)
25m Pistol Team	Germany; Monika Karsch; Michelle Skeries; Doreen Vennekamp	Bulgaria; Maria Grozdeva; Antoaneta Boneva; Monika Kostova	France; Mathilde Lamolle; Stéphanie Tirode; Sandrine Goberville

==== Rifle ====
Event	Gold	Silver	Bronze
50m Rifle Prone	Jennifer McIntosh (GBR)	Dariya Sharipova (UKR)	Marie Enqvist (SWE)
50m Rifle Prone Team	Ukraine; Dariya Sharipova; Natallia Kalnysh; Lessia Leskiv	Germany; Silvia Rachl; Beate Köstel; Jolyn Beer	Austria; Nadine Ungerank; Olivia Hofmann; Franziska Peer
50m Rifle 3 Positions	Seonaid McIntosh (GBR)	Franziska Peer (AUT)	Jolyn Beer (GER)
50m Rifle 3 Positions Team	Great Britain; Seonaid McIntosh; Jennifer McIntosh; Katie Gleeson	Ukraine; Natallia Kalnysh; Lessia Leskiv; Dariya Sharipova	France; Romane Matte; Laurence Brize; Marie Fayolle

==== 300 m rifle ====
Event	Gold	Silver	Bronze
300m Rifle Prone	Elin Åhlin (SWE)	Olivia Hofmann (AUT)	Anna Normann (SWE)
300m Rifle Prone Team	Sweden; Elin Åhlin; Anna Normann; Marie Enqvist	Germany; Eva Rösken; Lisa Müller; Sandra Georg	Estonia; Anzela Voronova; Liudmila Kortshagina; Tuuli Kübarsepp
300m Rifle 3 Positions	Franziska Peer (AUT)	Lisa Müller (GER)	Sina Oleane Busk (NOR)
300m Rifle 3 Positions Team	Switzerland; Silvia Guignard Schnyder; Myriam Brühwiler; Andrea Brühlmann	Poland; Sylwia Bogacka; Karolina Kowalczyk; Paula Wrońska	Ukraine; Lessia Leskiv; Natallia Kalnysh; Svitlana Boykova

==== Shotgun ====
Event	Gold	Silver	Bronze
Skeet	Lucie Anastassiou (FRA)	Andri Eleftheriou (CYP)	Christine Wenzel (GER)
Skeet Team	Germany; Christine Wenzel; Nele Wissmer; Katrin Wieslhuber	Italy; Diana Bacosi; Katiuscia Spada; Simona Scocchetti	Cyprus; Panagiota Andreou; Andri Eleftheriou; Konstantia Nikolaou
Trap	Arianna Perilli (SMR)	Ekaterina Rabaya (RUS)	Satu Makela-Nummela (FIN)
Trap Team	Russia; Ekaterina Rabaya; Tatiana Barsuk; Yulia Tugolukova	France; Marina Sauzet; Delphine Réau; Melanie Couzy	Slovakia; Zuzana Rehak Stefecekova; Jana Spotakova; Nina Slamkova
Double Trap (not counted in medal table) Only 4 Athletes	Sofia Maglio (ITA)	Claudia De Luca (ITA)	Monica Girotto (ITA)
Double Trap Team (not counted in medal table) Only 1 Team	Italy; Sofia Maglio; Claudia De Luca; Monica Girotto (not awarded)	not awarded	not awarded

=== Mixed Senior events (3) ===
Event	Gold	Silver	Bronze
300m Rifle Mixed Team	Switzerland 1	Sweden	Austria 2
Trap Mixed Team	Italy 1 Giovanni Pellielo; Jessica Rossi	Slovenia; Tomaz Blazinsek; Jasmina Macek	Russia 2 Maksim Smykov; Tatiana Barsuk
Skeet Mixed Team	France 1 Anthony Terras; Lucie Anastassiou	Cyprus 2 Dimitris Konstantinou; Andri Eleftheriou	Italy 1 Gabriele Rossetti; Diana Bacosi

=== Men's Junior events (22) ===
Event	Gold	Silver	Bronze
25m Pistol	Ernests Erbs (LAT)	Edouard Dortomb (FRA)	Daniil Shikhov (RUS)
25m Pistol Team	Russia; Daniil Shikhov; Egor Ismakov; Alexander Petrov	Ukraine; Yuriy Kolesnyk; Pavlo Krepostniak; Maksym Horodynets	France; Edouard Dortomb; Clement Greffier; Laurent Cussigh
25m Standard Pistol	Pavlo Krepostniak (UKR)	Daniil Shikhov (RUS)	Ernests Erbs (LAT)
25m Standard Pistol Team	Russia; Daniil Shikhov; Egor Ismakov; Alexander Petrov	Ukraine; Yuriy Kolesnyk; Pavlo Krepostniak; Maksym Horodynets	Germany; Christoph Lutz; Florian Peter; Philip Heyer
25m Rapid Fire Pistol	Matej Rampula (CZE)	Maksym Horodynets (UKR)	Pavlo Krepostniak (UKR)
25m Rapid Fire Pistol Team	Ukraine; Maksym Horodynets; Pavlo Krepostniak; Denys Vorona	Germany; Florian Peter; Christoph Lutz; Philip Heyer	Russia; Egor Ismakov; Daniil Shikov; Alexander Petrov
50m Pistol	Robin Walter (GER)	Anton Aristarkhov (RUS)	Alessio Torracchi (ITA)
50m Pistol Team	Italy; Alessio Torracchi; Paolo Monna; Franco Caputo	Poland; Oskar Miliwek; Patryk Sakowski; Kacper Jurasz	Russia; Anton Aristarkhov; Alexander Petrov; Mikhail Isakov
50m Rifle Prone	Zalan Pekler (HUN)	Borna Petanjek (CRO)	Cameron Pirouet (GBR)
50m Rifle Prone Team	Germany; David Könders; Luc Fabian Dingerdissen; Kai Dembeck	Norway; Henrik Larsen; Jon-Hermann Hegg; Benjamin Tingsrud Karlsen	Hungary; Zalan Pekler; Peter Vas; Csaba Kovacs
50m Rifle 3 Positions	Filip Nepejchal (CZE)	Zalan Pekler (HUN)	Andrei Golovkov (RUS)
50m Rifle 3 Positions Team	Russia; Andrei Golovkov; Evgeniy Ishchenko; Artem Filippov	Czech Republic; Filip Nepejchal; Frantisek Smetana; Jiri Privratsky	Finland; Cristian Friman; Matias Kiuru; Sebastian Langstrom
Skeet	Johan Birklykke (DEN)	Elia Sdruccioli (ITA)	Emil Kjelgaard Petersen (DEN)
Skeet Team	Italy; Elia Sdruccioli; Valerio Palmucci; Erik Pittini	Denmark; Johan Birklykke; Emil Kjelgaard Petersen; Alexander Karlsen	Cyprus; Nicolas Vasiliou; Christodoulos Kokkinou; Petros Englezoudis
Trap	Vili Kopra (FIN)	Teo Petroni (ITA)	Emanuele Buccolieri (ITA)
Trap Team	Italy; Emanuele Buccolieri; Teo Petroni; Matteo Marongiu	Finland; Vili Kopra; Matias Koivu; Niko Kopra	France; Clement Bourgue; Jason Picaud; Nathan Thuillier
Double Trap (not counted in medal table)	James Dedman (GBR)	Jacopo de Foresta (ITA)	Gianluca Chetcuti (MLT)
Double Trap Team (not counted in medal table)	Great Britain; James Dedman; Thomas Edward Scott; Jake Janes	Italy; Jacopo de Foresta; Eraldo Apolloni; Nicolo Liceti	not awarded
50m Running Target	Ihor Kizyma (UKR)	Valerii Davydov (RUS)	Maksym Babushok (UKR)
50m Running Target Team (not counted in medal table)	Ukraine; Ihor Kizyma; Maksym Babushok; Roman Tovstopiat	Russia; Valerii Davydov; Iaroslav Klepikov; Aleksandr Beltiukov	not awarded
50m Running Target Mixed	Ihor Kizyma (UKR)	Andreas Bergstroem (SWE)	Valerii Davydov (RUS)
50m Running Target Mixed Team (not counted in medal table)	Ukraine; Ihor Kizyma; Maksym Babushok; Roman Tovstopiat	Russia; Valerii Davydov; Iaroslav Klepikov; Aleksandr Beltiukov	not awarded

=== Women's Junior events (10) ===
Event	Gold	Silver	Bronze
25m Pistol	Miroslava Mincheva (BUL)	Anna Dedova (CZE)	Veronika Major (HUN)
25m Pistol Team	Italy; Rebecca Lesti; Giulia Campostrini; Maria Varricchio	Hungary; Veronika Major; Boglarka Forrasi; Viktoria Egri	Ukraine; Polina Konarieva; Mariia-Solomiia Vozniak; Alona Shevchenko
50m Rifle Prone	Sara Karasova (CZE)	Selina Zimmermann (GBR)	Marianne Palo (FIN)
50m Rifle Prone Team	Czech Republic; Sara Karasova; Nikola Foistova; Katerina Kolarikova	Norway; Regine Nesheim; Jenny Stene; Karina Stette	Germany; Selina Zimmermann; Leah Faust; Johanna Theresa Tripp
50m Rifle 3 Positions	Anna Ilina (UKR)	Jenny Stene (NOR)	Milica Babic (SRB)
50m Rifle 3 Positions Team	Norway; Jenny Stene; Regine Nesheim; Jeanette Hegg Duestad	Russia; Tatiana Kharkova; Daria Boldinova; Maria Ivanova	Austria; Sheileen Waibel; Verena Zaisberger; Rebecca Koeck
Skeet	Artemis Kefalidou (GRE)	Elena Bukhonova (RUS)	Francesca del Prete (ITA)
Skeet Team	Italy; Francesca del Prete; Giada Longhi; Giulia Basso	Russia; Elena Bukhonova; Alina Fazylzyanova; MaArgarita Gevorkian	Germany; Maria Kalix; Eva-Tamara Reichert; Valentina Umhöfer
Trap	Marie-Louis Meyer (GER)	Bettina Valdorf (GER)	Greta Luppo (ITA)
Trap Team	Germany; Marie-Louis Meyer; Bettina Valdorf; KAthrin Murche	Italy; Greta Luppi; Diana Ghilarducci; Giulia Grassia	Russia; Polina Kniazeva; Iuliia Saveleva; Angelina Rudneva

== Youth Events ==
Qualification for the 2018 Youth Olympic Games (not counted in medal table).

=== Men's Youth events ===
Event	Gold	Silver	Bronze
10m Air Pistol	Nils Strubel (GER)	Kiril Kirov (BUL)	Abdul-Aziz Kurdzi (BLR)
10m Air Rifle	Grigorii Shamakov (RUS)	Alexander Vasilyev (RUS)	Denis Goncharenko (RUS)

=== Women's Youth events ===
Event	Gold	Silver	Bronze
10m Air Pistol	Nadezhda Koloda (RUS)	Camille Jedrzejewski (FRA)	Giulia Campostrini (ITA)
10m Air Rifle	Johanna Theresa Tripp (GER)	Anna Janssen (GER)	Viivi Natalia Kemppi (FIN)

== Medal table ==
- After 73 of 73 Events (36 Individual + 37 Team) (originally 79 events)
- 45 Senior Events + 28 Junior Events = 73 (2 Senior and 4 Junior Events not counted in medal table). also Youth Events Not counted in table. because of Youth Olympic Qualification.
- http://www.esc-shooting.org/documents/results/

Rank	Nation	Gold	Silver	Bronze	Total
1	Ukraine (UKR)	10	8	4	22
2	Russia (RUS)	8	11	13	32
3	Italy (ITA)	8	5	5	18
4	Germany (GER)	7	10	8	25
5	Czech Republic (CZE)	6	2	2	10
6	Sweden (SWE)	5	4	5	14
7	France (FRA)	5	3	7	15
8	Switzerland (SUI)	4	1	0	5
9	Belarus (BLR)	4	0	0	4
10	Great Britain (GBR)	3	0	1	4
11	Austria (AUT)	2	5	5	12
12	Norway (NOR)	1	4	1	6
13	Hungary (HUN)	1	3	3	7
14	Finland (FIN)	1	2	6	9
15	Bulgaria (BUL)	1	1	1	3
15	Denmark (DEN)	1	1	1	3
15	Serbia (SRB)	1	1	1	3
18	Latvia (LAT)	1	0	2	3
19	Greece (GRE)	1	0	0	1
19	Portugal (POR)	1	0	0	1
19	San Marino (SMR)	1	0	0	1
19	Turkey (TUR)	1	0	0	1
23	Croatia (CRO)	0	3	1	4
24	Poland (POL)	0	3	0	3
25	Cyprus (CYP)	0	2	2	4
26	Slovenia (SLO)	0	2	1	3
27	Estonia (EST)	0	1	2	3
28	Slovakia (SVK)	0	1	1	2
29	Malta (MLT)	0	0	1	1
Totals (29 entries)		73	73	73	219

== Results Link ==
- Results
- Results Book
