= 2022 European 300 m Rifle Championships =

International sport shooting competition

Tournament information
- Location: Zagreb, Croatia
- Dates: July 25–July 30

The 2022 European 300 m Rifle Championships was the 12th edition of the 300 m rifle competition, European 300 m Rifle Championships, organised by the International Shooting Sport Federation as a stand-alone championships.

== Results ==
=== Men ===
| Event | Gold | Silver | Bronze |
|---|---|---|---|
| Men's 300 m Rifle 3 Positions | István Péni; Hungary | Tomasz Bartnik; Poland | Dimitri Dutendas; France |
| Men's Team 300 m Rifle 3 Positions | Austria; Gernot Rumpler; Alexander Schmirl; Bernhard Pickl | Switzerland; Pascal Bachmann; Gilles Dufaux; Sandro Greuter | Poland; Robert Kraskowski; Maciej Kowalewicz; Tomasz Bartnik |
| Men's 300 m Rifle Prone | Steffen Olsen; Denmark | Remi Moreno Flores; France | Pascal Bachmann; Switzerland |

=== Women ===
| Event | Gold | Silver | Bronze |
|---|---|---|---|
| Women's 300 m Rifle 3 Positions | Lisa Müller; Germany | Elin Ahlin; Sweden | Henna Viljanen; Finland |
| Women's Team 300 m Rifle 3 Positions | Switzerland; Anja Senti; Michèle Bertschi; Silvia Guignard | Germany; Veronika Münster; Anna-Lena Geuther; Lisa Müller | Poland; Paula Wrońska; Karolina Kowalczyk; Sylwia Bogacka |
| Women's 300 m Rifle Prone | Anja Senti; Switzerland | Karolina Kowalczyk; Poland | Elin Ahlin; Sweden |

=== Open ===
| Event | Gold | Silver | Bronze |
|---|---|---|---|
| Open 300 m Standard Rifle | Tomasz Bartnik; Poland | Bernhard Pickl; Austria | Silvia Guignard; Switzerland |

=== Mixed ===
| Event | Gold | Silver | Bronze |
|---|---|---|---|
| Mixed Team 300 m Rifle 3 Positions | Switzerland; Gilles Dufaux; Silvia Guignard | Sweden; Karl Olsson; Elin Ahlin | Switzerland; Pascal Bachmann; Anja Senti |
| Mixed Team 300 m Rifle Prone | Poland; Karolina Kowalczyk; Daniel Romańczyk | Switzerland; Silvia Guignard; Gilles Dufaux | Germany; Veronika Münster; Christian Dressel |

== Medal table ==
* Host nation (Croatia)

| Rank | Nation | Gold | Silver | Bronze | Total |
|---|---|---|---|---|---|
| 1 | Switzerland | 3 | 2 | 3 | 8 |
| 2 | Poland | 2 | 2 | 2 | 6 |
| 3 | Germany | 1 | 1 | 1 | 3 |
| 4 | Austria | 1 | 1 | 0 | 2 |
| 5 | Denmark | 1 | 0 | 0 | 1 |
| 5 | Hungary | 1 | 0 | 0 | 1 |
| 7 | Sweden | 0 | 2 | 1 | 3 |
| 8 | France | 0 | 1 | 1 | 2 |
| 9 | Finland | 0 | 0 | 1 | 1 |
| Totals (9 entries) | | 9 | 9 | 9 | 27 |
