= 2021 European Shooting Championships =

International sport shooting competition

2021 European Championships
- Location: Osijek, Croatia
- Dates: 22 May – 5 June 2021

The 2021 European Shooting Championships were held from 22 May to 5 June 2021 in Osijek, Croatia. 1,473 athletes from 52 countries competed.

The championship was originally scheduled to only include events for shotgun, cartridge rifle and pistol. Lohja in Finland was scheduled to host the European 10metre event championships for air rifle, air pistol and running target in February. However, travel restrictions related to the COVID-19 pandemic prevented this event from taking place. The 10m events were hosted in Osijek.

== Schedule ==
●	Finals

May / June	22	23	24	25	26	27	28	29	30	31	1	2	3	4	5	Total
Rifle	2	3	2	3	3	2	1	2	2	2		2	2	2	3	31
Pistol	2	3	3	2	1	1	2	1	5		1	1	1	1	3	27
Shotgun					2	4	2	2			2	4	2	2	4	24
Total	4	6	5	5	6	7	5	5	7	2	3	7	5	5	10	82
Cumulative Total	4	10	15	20	26	33	38	43	50	52	55	62	67	72	82	82

== Events ==
82 medal events:

Age: 46 events in seniors and 36 events in juniors.

Number: 43 individual events and 39 team events.

Due to the low number of entries, some events was a Grand Prix and didn't count as an event for the European Championship and not counted in medal table.

Number	Gun	Events	Details
1	Rifle	31	20 S + 11 J / 18 I + 15 T
2	Pistol	27	14 S + 13 J / 15 I + 12 T
3	Shotgun	24	12 S + 12 J / 12 I + 12 T
Total	Shooting	82	46 S + 36 J / 45 I + 39 T

Key: S=Senior, J=Junior / I=Individual, T=Team

=== Olympic Qualification ===
16 Tokyo olympic quota places in following events (Shooting at the 2020 Summer Olympics):

1. 10m Air Rifle Women and Men (2+2)
2. 10m Air Pistol Women and Men (1+1)
3. 25m Rapid Fire Pistol Men (1)
4. 25m Sport Pistol Women (1)
5. 50m Rifle 3x40 Women and Men (1+1)
6. Trap Women and Men (1+1)
7. Skeet Women and Men (2+2)

== Athletes ==
10 m events: 52 countries, 577 athletes, 1194 starts.

25m, 50m, 300m and shotgun events: 49 countries, 896 athletes, 1929 starts.

Total: 52 countries, 1473 athletes, 3123 starts.

== Medal table ==
73 events counted on medal table consist of 37 Individual and 36 Team events. Results Book:

* Host nation (Croatia)

Rank	Nation	Gold	Silver	Bronze	Total
1	Russia	18	15	13	46
2	Italy	16	12	7	35
3	France	5	0	4	9
4	Switzerland	4	2	2	8
5	Austria	3	5	2	10
6	Ukraine	3	4	1	8
7	Hungary	3	3	6	12
8	Germany	3	1	1	5
9	Spain	2	3	4	9
10	Norway	2	3	2	7
11	Belarus	2	2	3	7
12	Great Britain	2	1	3	6
13	Slovakia	2	0	2	4
14	Estonia	2	0	0	2
15	Poland	1	4	1	6
16	Cyprus	1	3	1	5
17	Czech Republic	1	2	5	8
18	Croatia*	1	1	3	5
19	Denmark	1	1	0	2
19	Sweden	1	1	0	2
21	Serbia	0	4	1	5
22	Slovenia	0	1	3	4
23	Portugal	0	1	1	2
23	Turkey	0	1	1	2
25	Belgium	0	1	0	1
25	Bulgaria	0	1	0	1
25	Israel	0	1	0	1
28	Finland	0	0	3	3
29	Romania	0	0	2	2
30	Azerbaijan	0	0	1	1
30	Latvia	0	0	1	1
Totals (31 entries)		73	73	73	219

== Results ==
=== Men's Senior events ===
Event	Gold	Silver	Bronze
10 m Air Pistol	Juraj Tužinský; Slovakia	Vadim Mukhametyanov; Russia	Robin Walter; Germany
10 m Air Pistol Team	Russia; Artem Chernousov; Vadim Mukhametyanov; Anton Aristarkhov	Italy; Paolo Monna; Giuseppe Giordano; Alessio Torracchi	Turkey; Serdar Demirel; İsmail Keleş; Yusuf Dikeç
25 m Rapid Fire Pistol	Jean Quiquampoix; France	Leonid Yekimov; Russia	Clément Bessaguet; France
25 m Rapid Fire Pistol Team	France; Jean Quiquampoix; Clément Bessaguet; Yan Chesnel	Ukraine; Maksym Horodynets; Volodymyr Pasternak; Oleksandr Petriv	Czech Republic; Martin Podhráský; Martin Strnad; Tomáš Těhan
10 m Air Rifle	István Péni; Hungary	Sergy Rikhter; Israel	Vladimir Maslennikov; Russia
10 m Air Rifle Team	Russia; Vladimir Maslennikov; Sergey Kamenskiy; Evgeny Panchenko	Serbia; Lazar Kovačević; Milenko Sebić; Milutin Stefanović	Croatia; Brona Petanjek; Petar Gorša; Miran Maričić
50 m Rifle 3 Positions	Jon-Hermann Hegg; Norway	Henrik Larsen; Norway	Yury Shcherbatsevich; Belarus
50 m Rifle 3 Positions Team	Austria; Gernot Rumpler; Thomas Mathis; Patrick Diem	Norway; Simon Claussen; Henrik Larsen; Jon-Hermann Hegg	Switzerland; Jan Lochbihler; Christoph Dürr; Fabio Wyrsch
300 m Rifle Prone	Gernot Rumpler; Austria	Steffen Olsen; Denmark	Rajmond Debevec; Slovenia
300m Rifle 3 Positions	Steffen Olsen; Denmark	Gernot Rumpler; Austria	Andreas Thum; Austria
300m Rifle 3 Positions Team	Switzerland; Jan Lochbihler; Gilles Dufaux; Sandro Greuter	Austria; Gernot Rumpler; Andreas Thum; Bernhard Pickl	Slovenia; Robert Markoja; Rajmond Debevec; Erik Kandare
Trap	Matthew Coward-Holley; Great Britain	Jiří Lipták; Czech Republic	Mauro De Filippis; Italy
Trap Team	Slovakia; Erik Varga; Marián Kovačócy; Adrián Drobný	Italy; Daniele Resca; Valerio Grazini; Mauro De Filippis	Croatia; Anton Glasnović; Giovanni Cernogoraz; Josip Glasnović
Skeet	Gabriele Rossetti; Italy	Georgios Achilleos; Cyprus	Eetu Kallioinen; Finland
Skeet Team	Cyprus; Menelaos Michaelides; Nicolas Vasiliou; Georgios Achilleos	Russia; Sergey Demin; Nikolay Pilshchikov; Alexander Zemlin	Italy; Tammaro Cassandro; Luigi Lodde; Gabriele Rossetti

=== Women's Senior events ===
Event	Gold	Silver	Bronze
10 m Air Pistol	Carina Wimmer; Germany	Vitalina Batsarashkina; Russia	Céline Goberville; France
10 m Air Pistol Team	Ukraine; Olena Kostevych; Polina Kolesnikova; Yuliya Korostylova	Russia; Vitalina Batsarashkina; Margarita Chernousova; Daria Sirtokina	Serbia; Zorana Arunović; Brankica Zarić; Jasmina Milovanović
25 m Pistol	Mathilde Lamolle; France	Monika Karsch; Germany	Vitalina Batsarashkina; Russia
25 m Pistol Team	Germany; Doreen Vennekamp; Monika Karsch; Carina Wimmer	Bulgaria; Maria Grozdeva; Miroslava Mincheva; Antoaneta Kostadinova	Hungary; Renáta Tobai-Sike; Veronika Major; Zsófia Csonka
10 m Air Rifle	Océanne Muller; France	Jessie Kaps; Belgium	Sofia Ceccarello; Italy
10 m Air Rifle Team	Russia; Yulia Zykova; Anastasiia Galashina; Yulia Karimova	Slovenia; Urška Kuharič; Živa Dvoršak; Klavdija Jerovšek	Romania; Laura Ilie; Roxana Sidi; Eliza Molnar
50 m Rifle 3 Positions	Sofia Ceccarello; Italy	Yulia Zykova; Russia	Jeanette Hegg Duestad; Norway
50 m Rifle 3 Positions Team	Russia; Yulia Zykova; Polina Khorosheva; Yulia Karimova	Norway; Katrine Lund; Jenny Stene; Jeanette Hegg Duestad	Austria; Franziska Peer; Sheileen Waibel; Olivia Hofmann
300 m Rifle Prone	Muriel Züger; Switzerland	Paula Wrońska; Poland	Anja Senti; Switzerland
300 m Rifle 3 Positions	Silvia Guignard; Switzerland	Elin Ahlin; Sweden	Urška Kuharič; Slovenia
300 m Rifle 3 Positions Team	Poland; Karolina Kowalczyk; Paula Wrońska; Sylwia Bogacka	Switzerland; Silvia Guignard; Muriel Züger; Anja Senti	not awarded
Trap	Daria Semianova; Russia	Jessica Rossi; Italy	Carole Cormenier; France
Trap Team	Russia; Daria Semianova; Ekaterina Subbotina; Iuliia Saveleva	Italy; Fiammetta Rossi; Silvana Stanco; Jessica Rossi	France; Mélanie Couzy; Loémy Recasens; Carole Cormenier
Skeet	Chiara Cainero; Italy	Zilia Batyrshina; Russia	Amber Hill; Great Britain
Skeet Team	Germany; Nadine Messerschmidt; Katrin Butterer; Christine Wenzel	Italy; Diana Bacosi; Martina Bartolomei; Chiara Cainero	Russia; Alina Fazylzyanova; Nadezda Konovalova; Zilia Batyrshina

=== Senior Open events ===
Event	Gold	Silver	Bronze
25 m Standard Pistol	Matěj Rampula; Czech Republic	Oskar Miliwek; Poland	Artem Chernousov; Russia
25 m Center Fire Pistol	Peeter Olesk; Estonia	Oskar Miliwek; Poland	Ruslan Lunev; Azerbaijan
50 m Rifle Prone	Henrik Larsen; Norway	Rebecca Köck; Austria	Aliaksandra Dmitrieva; Belarus
300 m Standard Rifle	Gernot Rumpler; Austria	Bernhard Pickl; Austria	Tomasz Bartnik; Poland
50 m Pistol	Oleh Omelchuk; Ukraine	Damir Mikec; Serbia	Viktor Bankin; Ukraine
Double Trap	Anton Glasnović; Croatia	Andrea Vescovi; Italy	Alessandro Chianese; Italy

=== Mixed Senior events ===
Event	Gold	Silver	Bronze
10 m Air Pistol Mixed Team	Russia; Vitalina Batsarashkina; Artem Chernousov	Serbia; Zorana Arunović; Damir Mikec	Portugal; Joana Castelão; João Costa
25 m Rapid Fire Pistol Mixed Team	Ukraine; Yuliya Korostylova; Oleksandr Petriv	Ukraine; Anastasiia Nimets; Volodymyr Pasternak	Russia; Nadezhda Koloda; Leonid Yekimov
10 m Air Rifle Mixed Team	France; Océanne Muller; Brian Baudouin	Russia; Anastasiia Galashina; Vladimir Maslennikov	Russia; Yulia Karimova; Sergey Kamenskiy
50 m Air Rifle 3 Positions Mixed Team	Russia; Yulia Zykova; Sergey Kamenskiy	Austria; Gernot Rumpler; Sheileen Waibel	Norway; Simon Claussen; Jenny Stene
300 m Rifle 3 Positions Mixed Team	Switzerland; Jan Lochbihler; Silvia Guignard	Switzerland; Gilles Dufaux; Anja Senti	Finland; Aleksi Leppä; Henna Viljanen
Trap Mixed Team	Italy; Jessica Rossi; Valerio Grazini	United Kingdom; Matthew Coward-Holley; Charlotte Hollands	Spain; Alberto Fernández; Fátima Gálvez
Skeet Mixed Team	Sweden; Stefan Nilsson; Victoria Larsson	Czech Republic; Jakub Tomeček; Barbora Šumová	Italy; Martina Bartolomei; Gabriele Rossetti

=== Men's Junior events ===
Event	Gold	Silver	Bronze
10 m Air Pistol	Federico Maldini; Italy	Ivan Kazak; Belarus	Martín Freije; Spain
10 m Air Pistol Team	Belarus; Ivan Kazak; Uladzislau Dzemesh; Mikita Kavalionak	Ukraine; Maksym Klimas; Danylo Miklukho; Roman Kopiika	Slovakia; Lukáš Filip; Marek Copák; Jerguš Vengríni
25 m Pistol	Federico Maldini; Italy	Nikita Mann; Russia	Daniels Vilciņš; Latvia
25 m Rapid Fire Pistol	Nikita Mann; Russia	Dmitrii Maliukov; Russia	Michele Palella; Italy
10 m Air Rifle	Danilo Sollazzo; Italy	Marko Ivanović; Serbia	Jesús Oviedo; Spain
10 m Air Rifle Team	Russia; Evgenii Potapov; Igor Skuratov; Matvei Potapov	Spain; Jesús Oviedo; Jorge Estévez; Juan Cecilia	Italy; Danilo Sollazzo; Agustin Martin Petrini; Michele Bernardi
50 m Rifle 3 Positions	Soma Hammerl; Hungary	Matvei Potapov; Russia	Nikita Turanov; Russia
50 m Rifle 3 Positions Team	Russia; Matvei Potapov; Igor Skuratov; Nikita Turanov	Hungary; Viktor Kiss; Ferenc Török; Soma Hammerl	Croatia; Luka Jambreuš; Josip Sikavica; Tvrtko Vrčić
Trap	Kirill Bagrov; Russia	Lorenzo Franquillo; Italy	Andrés García; Spain
Trap Team	Spain; Javier Martínez Fuster; Andrés García; Juan Antonio García	Italy; Lorenzo Franquillo; Alberto Facci; Edoardo Antonioli	Finland; Juho Mäkelä; Kaarlo Hoppu; Juho Montonen
Skeet	Cristian Ghilli; Italy	Kleanthis Varnavides; Cyprus	Petros Englezoudis; Cyprus
Skeet Team	Italy; Cristian Ghilli; Francesco Bernardini; Giammarco Tuzi	Cyprus; Kleanthis Varnavides; Sotiris Andreou; Petros Englezoudis	Great Britain; Mitchell Brooker-Smith; Arran Eccleston; Oliver Harrison

=== Women's Junior events ===
Event	Gold	Silver	Bronze
10 m Air Pistol	Margherita Veccaro; Italy	Vasilisa Naumava; Belarus	Anna Asomchik; Russia
10 m Air Pistol Team	Italy; Brunella Aria; Alessandra Fair; Margherita Veccaro	Turkey; Şimal Yılmaz; Yasemin Beyza Yılmaz; Ilayda Nur Çürük	Hungary; Sára Ráhel Fábián; Viktória Berde; Réka Ozsváth
25 m Pistol	Margherita Veccaro; Italy	Albina Bevz; Russia	Miriam Jako; Hungary
25 m Pistol Team	Russia; Albina Bevz; Ekaterina Chikanova; Daria Litau	Ukraine; Viliena Bevz; Yana Chuchmarova; Nadiia Shamanova	Hungary; Sára Ráhel Fábián; Miriam Jako; Tuende Szakacs
10 m Air Rifle	Julia Piotrowska; Poland	Eszter Mészáros; Hungary	Alina Khizbullina; Russia
10 m Air Rifle Team	Russia; Aigul Khabibullina; Violetta Odinaeva; Alina Khizbullina	Spain; Helena Arias; Zahra González; Inés Martinón	Hungary; Eszter Mészáros; Gitta Bajos; Anna Tóth
50 m Rifle 3 Positions	Eszter Mészáros; Hungary	Helena Arias; Spain	Alina Khizbullina; Russia
50 m Rifle 3 Positions Team	Italy; Paola Paravati; Virginia Lepri; Sofia Benetti	Switzerland; Jennifer Kocher; Marta Szabo Bouza; Sandra Arnold	Czech Republic; Katerina Štefanková; Sara Karasová; Veronika Blažíčková
Trap	Lucy Hall; Great Britain	Maria Inês Coelho de Barros; Portugal	Zina Hrdličková; Czech Republic
Trap Team	Russia; Serafima Tarasenko; Alina Akhatova; Polina Kniazeva	Italy; Giorgia Lenticchia; Sofia Littame; Gaia Ragazzini	Czech Republic; Zina Hrdličková; Tereza Závišková; Lea Kučerová
Skeet	Sara Bongini; Italy	Arina Kuznetsova; Russia	Daria Lekomtseva; Russia
Skeet Team	Russia; Anna Zhadnova; Arina Kuznetsova; Daria Lekomtseva	Italy; Giada Longhi; Damiana Paolacci; Sara Bongini	Slovakia; Dominika Buzášová; Miroslava Hocková; Adela Supeková

=== Junior Open events ===
Event	Gold	Silver	Bronze
25 m Standard Pistol	Nikita Mann; Russia	Aleksei Iarichin; Russia	Dmitrii Maliukov; Russia
50 m Rifle Prone	Katrin Smirnova; Estonia	Michał Chojnowski; Poland	Veronika Blažíčková; Czech Republic

=== Mixed Junior events ===
Event	Gold	Silver	Bronze
10 m Air Pistol Mixed Team	Belarus; Aliaksandra Piatrova; Uladzislau Dzemesh	Italy; Margherita Veccaro; Federico Maldini	Belarus; Vasilisa Naumava; Ivan Kazak
25 m Rapid Fire Pistol Mixed Team	Russia; Nikita Mann; Ekaterina Chikanova	Russia; Aleksei Iarichin; Albina Bevz	not awarded
10 m Air Rifle Mixed Team	Spain; Helena Arias; Jesús Oviedo	Italy; Virginia Lepri; Agustin Martin Petrini	Russia; Aigul Khabibullina; Evgenii Potapov
50 m Rifle 3 Positions Mixed Team	Russia; Igor Skuratov; Alina Khizbullina	Hungary; Eszter Dénes; Soma Hammerl	Hungary; Eszter Mészáros; Viktor Kiss
Trap Mixed Team	Italy; Giorgia Lenticchia; Lorenzo Franquillo	Croatia; Natali Banko; Matej Vucoić	Great Britain; Lucy Hall; Thomas Betts
Skeet Mixed Team	Italy; Sara Bongini; Cristian Ghilli	Russia; Artem Glotov; Arina Kuznetsova	Romania; Etienne Islai; Raveca Islai

== See also ==
- Shooting at the 2020 Summer Olympics
- 2021 ISSF World Cup
