= Shooting at the 2023 European Games – Women's team 50 metre rifle three positions =

Women's team 50 metre rifle three positions at the 2023 European Games
- Venue: Wrocław Shooting Centre
- Dates: 29 June
- Competitors: 36 from 12 nations
- Teams: 12

Medalists
gold medal	Jeanette Hegg Duestad; Mari Bårdseng Løvseth; Jenny Stene	Norway
silver medal	Nina Christen; Sarina Hitz; Chiara Leone	Switzerland
bronze medal	Jolyn Beer; Anna Janssen; Lisa Müller	Germany

The women's team 50 metre rifle three positions event at the 2023 European Games took place on 29 June at the Wrocław Shooting Centre.

== Records ==
Prior to this competition, the existing world, European and Games records were as follows.

Qualification
World Record	—	—	—	—
European Record	Germany; Jolyn Beer; Anna Janssen; Lisa Müller	1329	Cairo, Egypt	22 October 2022
Games Record	—	—	—	—

== Results ==
=== Qualification 1 ===
Rank	Country	Athlete	Kneeling	Prone	Standing	Total	Team total	Notes
1	Serbia	Ivana Maksimović	150	150	147	447-28x	1335-75x	Q, ER, GR
1	Serbia	Andrea Arsović	149	149	146	444-24x	1335-75x	Q, ER, GR
1	Serbia	Teodora Vukojević	147	148	149	444-23x	1335-75x	Q, ER, GR
2	Germany	Anna Janssen	147	150	148	445-30x	1327-74x	Q
2	Germany	Jolyn Beer	147	150	144	441-22x	1327-74x	Q
2	Germany	Lisa Müller	149	148	144	441-22x	1327-74x	Q
3	Norway	Jeanette Hegg Duestad	147	149	149	445-31x	1321-78x	Q
3	Norway	Jenny Stene	149	147	145	441-28x	1321-78x	Q
3	Norway	Mari Bårdseng Løvseth	145	148	142	435-19x	1321-78x	Q
4	Hungary	Eszter Mészáros	149	146	145	440-20x	1311-63x	Q
4	Hungary	Eszter Dénes	143	147	146	436-24x	1311-63x	Q
4	Hungary	Dorina Lovász	143	146	146	435-19x	1311-63x	Q
5	Czech Republic	Lucie Brázdová	146	149	147	442-23x	1311-63x	Q
5	Czech Republic	Veronika Blažíčková	149	149	139	437-23x	1311-63x	Q
5	Czech Republic	Aneta Brabcová	140	150	142	432-17x	1311-63x	Q
6	Switzerland	Nina Christen	146	150	145	441-28x	1310-63x	Q
6	Switzerland	Chiara Leone	147	150	141	438-20x	1310-63x	Q
6	Switzerland	Sarina Hitz	145	148	138	431-15x	1310-63x	Q
7	Denmark	Rikke Ibsen	147	147	143	437-24x	1309-60x	Q
7	Denmark	Stephanie Grundsøe	145	149	143	437-21x	1309-60x	Q
7	Denmark	Anna Nielsen	143	147	145	435-15x	1309-60x	Q
8	Ukraine	Daria Tykhova	146	149	149	444-27x	1309-60x	Q
8	Ukraine	Natallia Kalnysh	146	147	142	435-22x	1309-60x	Q
8	Ukraine	Viktoriya Sukhorukova	146	148	136	430-11x	1309-60x	Q
9	Italy	Barbara Gambaro	145	149	146	440-23x	1308-58x	
9	Italy	Sofia Ceccarello	145	148	145	438-22x	1308-58x	
9	Italy	Sofia Benetti	144	146	140	430-13x	1308-58x	
10	Austria	Sheileen Waibel	148	147	144	439-20x	1306-56x	
10	Austria	Nadine Ungerank	141	149	147	437-20x	1306-56x	
10	Austria	Marlene Pribitzer	142	146	142	430-16x	1306-56x	
11	Slovenia	Živa Dvoršak	148	146	144	438-18x	1304-54x	
11	Slovenia	Urška Kuharič	145	149	140	434-17x	1304-54x	
11	Slovenia	Klavdija Jerovšek	143	146	143	432-19x	1304-54x	
12	Poland	Aneta Stankiewicz	145	148	143	436-20x	1299-48x	
12	Poland	Natalia Kochańska	142	148	144	434-15x	1299-48x	
12	Poland	Julia Piotrowska	139	147	143	429-13x	1299-48x	

=== Qualification 2 ===
Rank	Country	Athlete	Kneeling	Prone	Standing	Total	Team total	Notes
1	Switzerland	Nina Christen	99	100	97	296-20x	884-52x	QG
1	Switzerland	Chiara Leone	98	99	98	295-19x	884-52x	QG
1	Switzerland	Sarina Hitz	95	99	99	293-13x	884-52x	QG
2	Norway	Mari Bårdseng Løvseth	99	98	97	294-13x	880-35x	QG
2	Norway	Jenny Stene	97	99	97	293-13x	880-35x	QG
2	Norway	Jeanette Hegg Duestad	97	98	98	293-9x	880-35x	QG
3	Germany	Jolyn Beer	99	99	96	294-16x	876-41x	QB
3	Germany	Lisa Müller	99	98	94	291-13x	876-41x	QB
3	Germany	Anna Janssen	98	97	96	291-12x	876-41x	QB
4	Ukraine	Daria Tykhova	98	98	98	294-18x	872-47x	QB
4	Ukraine	Natallia Kalnysh	98	99	93	290-14x	872-47x	QB
4	Ukraine	Viktoriya Sukhorukova	96	100	92	288-15x	872-47x	QB
5	Serbia	Teodora Vukojević	98	99	98	295-17x	872-44x	
5	Serbia	Andrea Arsović	96	99	95	290-14x	872-44x	
5	Serbia	Ivana Maksimović	93	98	96	287-13x	872-44x	
6	Hungary	Eszter Dénes	94	100	97	291-14x	870-41x	
6	Hungary	Eszter Mészáros	94	97	99	290-15x	870-41x	
6	Hungary	Dorina Lovász	97	98	94	289-12x	870-41x	
7	Czech Republic	Lucie Brázdová	98	100	95	293-13x	870-36x	
7	Czech Republic	Veronika Blažíčková	98	100	95	293-13x	870-36x	
7	Czech Republic	Aneta Brabcová	98	96	90	284-10x	870-36x	
8	Denmark	Stephanie Grundsøe	100	99	95	294-15x	867-37x	
8	Denmark	Rikke Ibsen	98	97	93	288-12x	867-37x	
8	Denmark	Anna Nielsen	92	98	95	285-10x	867-37x	

=== Finals ===
Rank	Country	Athletes	Total
Gold medal match
1st place, gold medalist(s)	Norway	Jeanette Hegg Duestad; Mari Bårdseng Løvseth; Jenny Stene	17
2nd place, silver medalist(s)	Switzerland	Nina Christen; Sarina Hitz; Chiara Leone	1
Bronze medal match
3rd place, bronze medalist(s)	Germany	Jolyn Beer; Anna Janssen; Lisa Müller	16
4	Ukraine	Natallia Kalnysh; Viktoriya Sukhorukova; Daria Tykhova	4
