= 2024 European Shooting Championship =

2024 European Shooting Championship may refer to:

- 2024 European 25/50/300 m Events Championships
- 2024 European 10 m Events Championships
- 2024 European Running Target Championships
- 2024 European Shotgun Championships
