= 2022 ISSF World Shooting Championships =

Shooting event in Egypt

2022 ISSF World Rifle/Pistol Shooting Championships
- Location: Cairo, Egypt
- Dates: 12–27 October
- Competitors: 1088 from 88 nations

The 1st ISSF Rifle/Pistol World Shooting Championships were held in New Administrative Capital, Egypt from 12 to 27 October 2022 in 78 events. This also served as qualification event for 2024 Summer Olympics.

== Medals ==
=== Senior ===
* Host nation (Egypt)

Rank	Nation	Gold	Silver	Bronze	Total
1	China (CHN)	12	6	8	26
2	Norway (NOR)	7	1	2	10
3	Germany (GER)	4	1	6	11
4	Ukraine (UKR)	3	2	3	8
5	Switzerland (SUI)	2	9	0	11
6	India (IND)	2	4	3	9
7	South Korea (KOR)	2	3	4	9
8	France (FRA)	2	2	0	4
9	United States (USA)	2	1	1	4
10	Poland (POL)	1	2	3	6
11	Austria (AUT)	1	1	4	6
12	Denmark (DEN)	1	1	0	2
13	Serbia (SRB)	1	0	2	3
14	Finland (FIN)	0	2	0	2
15	Iran (IRI)	0	1	2	3
16	Azerbaijan (AZE)	0	1	1	2
17	Greece (GRE)	0	1	0	1
17	Italy (ITA)	0	1	0	1
17	Mongolia (MGL)	0	1	0	1
20	Estonia (EST)	0	0	1	1
20	Hungary (HUN)	0	0	1	1
20	Pakistan (PAK)	0	0	1	1
20	Sweden (SWE)	0	0	1	1
Totals (23 entries)		40	40	43	123

== Medal summary ==
=== Senior ===
==== Men ====
Event	Gold		Silver		Bronze	
10 m air pistol	Liu Jinyao; China		Zhang Yifan; China		Pavlo Korostylov; Ukraine	
10 m air pistol team	China; Liu Jinyao; Zhang Bowen; Zhang Yifan		Iran; Mohammad Rasoul Effati; Javad Foroughi; Sajjad Pourhosseini		Korea; Lee Woon-ho; Lee Dae-myung; Park Dae-hun	
25 m center fire pistol	Christian Reitz; Germany	588	Ruslan Lunev; Azerbaijan	584; 24x	Peeter Olesk; Estonia	584; 21x
25 m rapid fire pistol	Lee Gun-hyeok; South Korea		Clément Bessaguet; France		Ghulam Mustafa Bashir; Pakistan	
25 m rapid fire pistol team	China; Li Yuehong; Lu Zhiming; Zhang Jueming		Ukraine; Maksym Horodynets; Pavlo Korostylov; Denys Kushnirov		Korea; Kim Seo-jun; Lee Jae-kyoon; Lee Gun-hyeok	
25 m standard pistol	Pavlo Korostylov; Ukraine	582	Christian Reitz; Germany	575	Vijayveer Sidhu; India	574
10 m air rifle	Rudrankksh Patil; India		Danilo Sollazzo; Italy		Sheng Lihao; China	
10 m air rifle team	India; Arjun Babuta; Kiran Ankush Jadhav; Rudrankksh Patil		China; Sheng Lihao; Song Buhan; Yang Haoran		Serbia; Milenko Sebić; Milutin Stefanović; Lazar Kovačević	
50 m pistol	Damir Mikec; Serbia	567	Zhang Bowen; China	564	Viktor Bankin; Ukraine	560
50 m rifle prone	Jan Lochbihler; Switzerland	631.0	Liu Yukun; China	630.6	Zhao Zhonghao; China	629.3
50 m rifle 3 positions	Serhiy Kulish; Ukraine		Tomasz Bartnik; Poland		Jon-Hermann Hegg; Norway	
50 m rifle 3 positions team	Norway; Simon Claussen; Jon-Hermann Hegg; Henrik Larsen		France; Brian Baudouin; Michael d'Halluin; Lucas Kryzs		India; Niraj Kumar; Swapnil Kusale; Aishwary Pratap Singh Tomar	
300 m rifle prone	Simon Claussen; Norway	599	Tomasz Bartnik; Poland	598	Alexander Schmirl; Austria	597
300 m rifle prone team	Denmark; Carsten Brandt; Jens-Ulrik Ladekjaer-Mikkelsen; Steffen Olsen		Switzerland; Pascal Bachmann; Gilles Dufaux; Sandro Greuter		Poland; Tomasz Bartnik; Maciej Kowalewicz; Daniel Romańczyk	
300 m rifle 3 positions	Emilien Chassat; France	592	Aleksi Leppä; Finland	590	István Péni; Hungary	589
300 m rifle 3 positions team	France; Emilien Chassat; Michael d'Halluin; Dimitri Dutendas		Switzerland; Pascal Bachmann; Gilles Dufaux; Sandro Greuter		Austria; Patrick Diem; Bernhard Pickl; Alexander Schmirl	

==== Women ====
Event	Gold		Silver		Bronze	
10 m air pistol	Lu Kaiman; China		Anna Korakaki; Greece		Zorana Arunović; Serbia	
10 m air pistol team	China; Jiang Ranxin; Li Xue Yan; Lu Kaiman		India; Palak Palak; Rhythm Sangwan; Yuvika Tomar		Iran; Mina Ghorbani; Hanieh Rostamian; Golnoush Sebghatollahi	
25 m pistol	Kim Jang-mi; South Korea		Chen Yan; China		Doreen Vennekamp; Germany	
25 m pistol team	China; Chen Yan; Liu Rui; Xiao Jiaruixuan		India; Manu Bhaker; Abhidnya Ashok Patil; Rhythm Sangwan		Germany; Monika Karsch; Michelle Skeries; Doreen Vennekamp	
25 m standard pistol	Xiao Jiaruixuan; China	575	Rhythm Sangwan; India	573	Chen Yan; China	572
10 m air rifle	Alison Marie Weisz; United States		Huang Yuting; China		Zhang Yu; China	
10 m air rifle team	China; Huang Yuting; Wang Zhilin; Zhang Yu		United States; Sagen Maddalena; Mary Carolynn Tucker; Alison Marie Weisz		India; Mehuli Ghosh; Meghana Sajjanar; Elavenil Valarivan	
50 m pistol	Jiang Ranxin; China		Sylvia Steiner; Austria		Nigar Nasirova; Azerbaijan	
50 m rifle prone	Jolyn Beer; Germany	627.0	Sarina Hitz; Switzerland	626.7	Mary Carolynn Tucker; United States	625.7
50 m rifle 3 positions	Miao Wanru; China		Jenny Stene; Norway		Jeanette Hegg Duestad; Norway	
50 m rifle 3 positions team	Germany; Jolyn Beer; Anna Janssen; Lisa Müller		Switzerland; Nina Christen; Sarina Hitz; Franziska Stark		China; Miao Wanru; Shi Mengyao; Zhang Qiongyue	
300 m rifle prone	Anja Senti; Switzerland	599	Silvia Guignard; Switzerland	597	Olivia Hofmann; Austria	595
300 m rifle prone team	Norway; Jeanette Hegg Duestad; Katrine Lund; Jenny Vatne		Switzerland; Silvia Guignard; Sarina Hitz; Anja Senti		Germany; Anna-Lena Geuther; Lisa Müller; Veronique Münster	
300 m rifle 3 positions	Jeanette Hegg Duestad; Norway	588	Sarina Hitz; Switzerland	586; 22x	Elin Ahlin; Sweden	586; 20x
300 m rifle 3 positions team	Norway; Jeanette Hegg Duestad; Katrine Lund; Jenny Vatne		Switzerland; Silvia Guignard; Sarina Hitz; Anja Senti		Germany; Anna-Lena Geuther; Lisa Müller; Veronique Münster	

==== Mixed ====
Event	Gold	Silver	Bronze
10 m air rifle	China; Huang Yuting; Yang Haoran	Korea; Gwon Da-yeong; Kim Sang-do	Korea; Cho Eun-young; Park Ha-jun China; Zhang Yu; Sheng Lihao
10 m air pistol	Austria; Sylvia Steiner; Richard Zechmeister	Korea; Yoo Hyun-young; Park Dae-hun	Iran; Hanieh Rostamian; Javad Foroughi China; Jiang Ranxin; Zhang Bowen
25 m rapid fire pistol	Ukraine; Yulia Korostylova; Maksym Horodynets	India; Simranpreet Kaur Brar; Anish Bhanwala	Korea; Kim Jang-mi; Kim Seo-jun
25 m standard pistol	Germany; Doreen Vennekamp; Christian Reitz	Korea; Kim Jang-mi; Kim Seo-jun	Ukraine; Olena Kostevych; Pavlo Korostylov
50 m pistol	China; Jiang Ranxin; Zhang Bowen	Mongolia; Tsogbadrakhyn Mönkhzul; Enkhtaivany Davaakhüü	Poland; Katarzyna Klepacz; Szymon Wojtyna China; Li Xue; Liu Jinyao
50 m rifle prone	United States; Sagen Maddalena; Ivan Roe	Ukraine; Daria Tykhova; Serhiy Kulish	Germany; Jolyn Beer; Maximilian Dallinger
50 m rifle 3 positions	Norway; Jenny Stene; Simon Claussen	Denmark; Stephanie Grundsøe; Steffen Olsen	Germany; David Koenders; Anna Janssen
300 m rifle 3 positions	Poland; Karolina Kowalczyk; Tomasz Bartnik	Finland; Henna Viljanen; Aleksi Leppä	Austria; Olivia Hofmann; Bernhard Pickl
300 m rifle prone	Norway; Jeanette Hegg Duestad; Simon Claussen	Switzerland; Anja Senti; Pascal Bachmann	Poland; Karolina Kowalczyk; Daniel Romanczyk

=== Junior ===
* Host nation (Egypt)

Rank	Nation	Gold	Silver	Bronze	Total
1	China (CHN)	16	9	7	32
2	India (IND)	10	6	10	26
3	South Korea (KOR)	1	2	2	5
4	United States (USA)	1	0	4	5
5	Serbia (SRB)	0	2	0	2
6	Germany (GER)	0	1	2	3
7	Finland (FIN)	0	1	1	2
7	Switzerland (SUI)	0	1	1	2
9	Czech Republic (CZE)	0	1	0	1
9	France (FRA)	0	1	0	1
9	Italy (ITA)	0	1	0	1
9	Norway (NOR)	0	1	0	1
9	Ukraine (UKR)	0	1	0	1
9	Uzbekistan (UZB)	0	1	0	1
15	Hungary (HUN)	0	0	2	2
16	Iran (IRI)	0	0	1	1
Totals (16 entries)		28	28	30	86

==== Men ====
Event	Gold		Silver		Bronze	
10 m air pistol	Gao Jinkang; China		Sagar Dangi; India		Varun Tomar; India	
10 m air pistol team	India; Sagar Dangi; Samrat Rana; Varun Tomar		Uzbekistan; Mukhammad Kamalov; Veniamin Nikitin; Ilkhombek Obidjonov		China; Gao Jinkang; Liu Yanchang; Liu Junhui	
25 m Pistol	Udhayveer Sidhu; India		Matteo Mastrovalerio; Italy		Liu Yangpan; China	
25 m rapid fire pistol	Wang Shiwen; China		Sameer Sameer; India		Liu Yangpan; China	
25 m rapid fire pistol team	China; Yang Liu; Wang Shiwen; Liu Yangpan		Korea; Lee Seung-hoon; Yoon Seo-yeong; Hong Suk-jin		India; Sameer Sameer; Udhayveer Sidhu; Adarsh Singh	
25 m standard pistol	Udhayveer Sidhu; India	568	Liu Yangpan; China	567; 16x	Sameer Sameer; India	567; 11x
10 m air rifle	Zhu Mingshuai; China		Du Linshu; China		Lei Haohan; China	
10 m air rifle team	India; Sri Karthik Sabari Raj; Divyansh Singh Panwar; Jain Vidit		China; Du Linshu; Zhu Mingshuai; Lei Haohan		United States; Rylan William Kissell; Scott Rockett; Benjamin Salas	
50 m pistol	Song Seung-ho; South Korea	546; 9x	Abhinav Choudhary; India	546; 6x	Lee Seung-jun; South Korea	543
50 m rifle prone	Du Linshu; China	623.0; WRJ	Julien Gallot; France	619.4	Ferenc Toeroek; Hungary	618.0
50 m rifle 3 positions	Du Linshu; China		Marko Ivanović; Serbia		Griffin Lake; United States	
50 m rifle 3 positions team	United States; Rylan William Kissell; Braden Wayne Peiser; Gavin Raymond Leigh Barnick		Ukraine; Ivan Tkalenko; Danylo Hrynyk; Oleksii Viatchin		India; Surya Pratap Singh; Pankaj Mukheja; Sartaj Singh Tiwana	

==== Women ====
Event	Gold		Silver		Bronze	
10 m air pistol	Wang Siyu; China		Zhao Nan; China		Shen Yiyao; China	
10 m air pistol team	India; Shikha Narwal; Esha Singh; Varsha Singh		China; Shen Yiyao; Wang Siyu; Zhao Nan		Korea; Kim Minseo; Kim Yeseul; Yang Jiin	
25 m pistol	Esha Singh; India		Feng Sixuan; China		Miriam Jako; Hungary	
25 m pistol team	China; Luo Zizhao; Feng Sixuan; Yao Qianxun		Korea; Kim Minseo; Kim Yeseul; Yang Jiin		India; Naamya Kapoor; Vibhuti Bhatia; Esha Singh	
25 m standard pistol	Feng Sixuan; China	580	Zhao Nan; China	566	Tejaswani Tejaswani; India	557
10 m air rifle	Ramita Ramita; India		Shen Ying; China		Tilottama Sen; India	
10 m air rifle team	India; Tilottama Sen; Nancy Nancy; Ramita Ramita		China; Liu Yafei; Shen Ying; Yang Lanlan		Finland; Essi Heiskanen; Viivi Kemppi; Alexandra Rosenlew	
50 m pistol	Divanshi Divanshi; India	547	Varsha Singh; India	539	Tiyana Tiyana; India	523
50 m rifle prone	Hou Min; China	624.0; WRJ	Nele Stark; Germany	622.1	Gina Daniela Gyger; Switzerland	620.5
50 m rifle 3 positions	Pang Yuqian; China		Alexandra Rosenlew; Finland		Armina Sadeghian; Iran	
50 m rifle 3 positions team	China; Li Rui; Hou Min; Pang Yuqian		Switzerland; Marta Szabo Bouza; Gina Daniela Gyger; Jennifer Kocher		Germany; Hannah Wehren; Nele Stark; Larissa Weindorf	

==== Mixed ====
Event	Gold	Silver	Bronze
10 m air rifle	China; Shen Ying; Du Linshu	Serbia; Alexsandra Havran; Marko Ivanović	China; Liu Yafei; Zhu Mingshuai India; Nancy Nancy; Sri Karthik Sabari Raj Ravishankar
10 m air pistol	India; Esha Singh; Samrat Rana	India; Shikha Narwal; Sagar Dangi	China; Shen Yiyao; Liu Junhui Germany; Celina Becker; Andreas Köppl
25 m standard pistol	China; Feng Sixuan; Liu Yangpan	India; Manvi Jain; Sameer Sameer	India; Payal Kuldeep Khatri; Sahil Vijay Dudhane
50 m rifle prone	China; Pang Yuqian; Du Linshu	Czech Republic; Adela Zrustová; Vojtech Zaborec	United States; Katie Lorraine Zaun; Rylan William Kissell
50 m rifle 3 positions	China; Pang Yuqian; Du Linshu	Norway; Martine Sve; Jens Olsrud Oestli	United States; Katie Lorraine Zaun; Rylan William Kissell

=== Total (Senior and Junior) ===
* Host nation (Egypt)

Rank	Nation	Gold	Silver	Bronze	Total
1	China (CHN)	28	15	15	58
2	India (IND)	12	10	13	35
3	Norway (NOR)	5	2	2	9
4	Germany (GER)	4	2	7	13
5	South Korea (KOR)	3	5	6	14
6	Ukraine (UKR)	3	3	3	9
7	United States (USA)	3	1	5	9
8	Switzerland (SUI)	2	7	1	10
9	France (FRA)	2	3	0	5
10	Serbia (SRB)	1	2	2	5
11	Poland (POL)	1	2	1	4
12	Austria (AUT)	1	1	4	6
13	Finland (FIN)	0	3	1	4
14	Italy (ITA)	0	2	0	2
15	Iran (IRI)	0	1	3	4
16	Azerbaijan (AZE)	0	1	1	2
17	Czech Republic (CZE)	0	1	0	1
17	Denmark (DEN)	0	1	0	1
17	Greece (GRE)	0	1	0	1
17	Mongolia (MGL)	0	1	0	1
17	Uzbekistan (UZB)	0	1	0	1
22	Hungary (HUN)	0	0	3	3
23	Estonia (EST)	0	0	1	1
23	Pakistan (PAK)	0	0	1	1
23	Sweden (SWE)	0	0	1	1
Totals (25 entries)		65	65	70	200

== Olympic quotas ==
Nation	Men's				Women's				Total
Nation	FR 3x40	AR 60	RFP	AP 60	R 3x40	AR 60W	SP	AP 60W	Total
Armenia								1	1
Bulgaria							1		1
Czech Republic		1							1
China	1	1	1	1	1	1	1	1	8
Greece								1	1
Germany			1						1
India	1	1							2
Iran							1		1
Italy		1							1
Norway					1				1
Pakistan			1	1					2
Poland	1					1			2
Serbia								1	1
South Korea			1	1	1	1	1		5
Ukraine	1			1					2
United States					1	1			2
Total: 16 countries	4	4	4	4	4	4	4	4	32

== See also ==
- 2022 World Running Target Championships
- 2022 World Shotgun Championships
