= Buğra Selimzade =

Turkish sport shooter (born 1988)

Personal information
- Full name: Buğra Selimzade
- Nationality: Turkish
- Born: 9 November 1988 (age 37) Trabzon, Turkey
- Years active: 2018-

Sport
- Country: Turkey
- Sport: Air pistol
- Events: 10 m air pistol, 50 m pistol
- Club: Parla Akademi S.C.
Medal record
Shooting
Representing Turkey
European Games
Silver medal – second place	2023 Wrocław	10 m air pistol team
European Championships
Gold medal – first place	2023 Tallinn	10 m air pistol team
Gold medal – first place	2024 Győr	10 m air pistol trio
Gold medal – first place	2025 Osijek	10 m air pistol trio
Gold medal – first place	2025 Châteauroux	50 m pistol
Gold medal – first place	2026 Yerevan	10 m air pistol trio
Silver medal – second place	2024 Győr	10 m air pistol team
Silver medal – second place	2025 Châteauroux	50 m pistol team
Silver medal – second place	2026 Yerevan	10 m air pistol team
Bronze medal – third place	2025 Châteauroux	25 m std pistol team
Mediterranean Games
Silver medal – second place	2026 Taranto	10 m air pistol mixed team
Bronze medal – third place	2026 Taranto	10 m air pistol
ISSF World Cup
Gold medal – first place	2023 Jakarta	10 m air pistol team
Bronze medal – third place	2024 Granada	10 m air pistol

Buğra Selimzade (born 9 November 1988 in Trabzon), is a Turkish sport shooter who competes in the pistol event. He is a member of the national team.

== Personal life ==
Buğra Selimzade, was born in Trabzon, Turkey on 9 November 1988. He lives in Trabzon.

He studied Economy in the university.

== Early years ==
Selimzade developed a passion for shooting with shotgun while he was still in primary school in Trabzon. During his high school years, he tried pistol and rifle shooting. Then, he got interested in air pistol shooting, and bought himself an air pistol financed by a bank credit of his father. His sport shooting career started in 2018. After one year of exercise with his coach Murat Örgün, he successfully took part at national championships. He became eligible to be selected for the national team when he scored 574 points in 60 shots at the Turkish championship in March 2019. As the shooting range, he used to attend, closed during the COVID-19 pandemic, he installed a shooting range at home to continue with exercising. He was a member of Nişantaşı Shooting Club before he transferred to Parla Akademi Sport Club and the Hunting Club of Trabzon.

== International career ==
Selimzade mostly competes in 10m air pistol team events. He exercises shooting seven days a week, at home if he cannot go to the shooting range.

=== 2022 ===
He was admitted to the national team in 2022.

In October 2022, he competed with his teammates, Yusuf Dikeç and İsmail Keleş, in the 10m air pistol team event at the ISSF World Shooting Championships held in Cairo, Egypt. The Turkish team lost the bronze medal match and ranked fourth. In the individual event, he ranked seventh.

=== 2023 ===
Selimzade won the gold medal with his teammates, Dikeç and Keleş, in the 10m air pistol team event at the second leg of the 2023 ISSF World Cup in Jakarta, Indonesia.

He and his teammates, Dikeç and Keleş, captured the gold medal at the 2023 European 10 m Events Championships in Tallinn, Estonia.

Selimzade won the silver medal in the 10m air pistol team event with his teammates, Dikeç and Keleş, at the 2023 European Games in Wrocław, Poland.

=== 2024 ===
At the third leg of the 2024 ISSF World Cup in Granada, Spain, he took the bronze medal in the 10m air pistol event.

Selimzade and his teammates, Dikeç and Keleş, won the silver medal at the 2024 European 10 m Events Championships in Győr, Hungary.

=== 2025 ===
He won the gold medal with his teammates, Yusuf Dikeç and İsmail Keleş, in the 10m air pistol trio event at the 2025 European 10 m Events Championships in Osijek, Croatia.
