= Jolyn Beer =

German sport shooter (born 1994)

Personal information
- Nationality: German
- Born: 26 May 1994 (age 32)

Sport
- Country: Germany
- Sport: Shooting
- Event: Air rifle
- Club: SV Lochtum
Medal record
Women's shooting
Representing Germany
World Championships
Gold medal – first place	2018 Changwon	50 m rifle 3 positions team
Gold medal – first place	2018 Changwon	300 m rifle prone team
Gold medal – first place	2018 Changwon	300 m rifle 3 positions team
Gold medal – first place	2022 Cairo	50 m rifle prone
Silver medal – second place	2018 Changwon	300 m rifle 3 positions
Bronze medal – third place	2022 Cairo	50 m rifle prone mixed team
Bronze medal – third place	2023 Baku	50 m rifle prone
European Games
Bronze medal – third place	2023 Kraków-Małopolska	50 m rifle 3 positions team
European Championships
Gold medal – first place	2015 Maribor	50 m rifle prone team
Gold medal – first place	2019 Bologna	300 m rifle 3 positions
Gold medal – first place	2019 Bologna	300 m rifle 3 positions team
Gold medal – first place	2022 Wrocław	50 m rifle 3 positions team
Silver medal – second place	2015 Maribor	50 m rifle 3 positions team
Silver medal – second place	2017 Baku	50 m rifle prone team
Silver medal – second place	2019 Bologna	300 m rifle prone team
Bronze medal – third place	2017 Baku	50 m rifle 3 positions
Bronze medal – third place	2019 Bologna	50 m rifle prone team
Bronze medal – third place	2019 Bologna	50 m rifle 3 positions team

Jolyn Beer (born 26 May 1994) is a German sport shooter.

She participated at the 2018 ISSF World Shooting Championships, winning a medal. She is openly lesbian.
