= Franziska Stark (sport shooter) =

Swiss sport shooter

Personal information
- National team: Switzerland
- Citizenship: Swiss
- Born: Franziska Stark; 18 February 1999 (age 27)
- Occupation: Sport Shooter

Sport
- Country: Switzerland
- Sport: Shooting
- Events: 10 meter air rifle; 50 meter rifle prone; 50 meter rifle three positions
- Coached by: Enrico Friedemann
Medal record
Women's shooting
Representing Switzerland
World Championships
Silver medal – second place	2022 Cairo	50m Rifle 3-Position - Women's Team
World Cup
Gold medal – first place	2023 Jakarta	50m Rifle 3-Positions - Women's Team
Gold medal – first place	2023 Jakarta	50m Rifle 3-Positions - Mixed Team
Bronze medal – third place	2022 Rio de Janeiro	50m Rifle 3-Positions - Women's Team
Bronze medal – third place	2022 Cairo	50m Rifle 3-Positions - Women's Team
European Championships
Silver medal – second place	2025 Châteauroux	50 m Rifle Prone
Silver medal – second place	2025 Châteauroux	50 m Rifle Prone Team
Bronze medal – third place	2025 Châteauroux	50 m Rifle 3 Positions Team

Franziska Stark (born 18 February 1999) is a Swiss sports shooter. She won a silver medal at the 2022 ISSF World Shooting Championships, and has won four medals at ISSF World Cups.

== Sporting career ==
Stark began shooting in 2009, and started competing internationally in 2016. She received her first international selection in 2016, shooting at the 2016 European Junior Shooting Championships in Tallinn.

In 2022 Stark won two bronze medals in World Cup team events for 50m 3-position rifle.

She was selected for the Swiss team to the 2022 ISSF World Championships in Cairo, where she won a silver medal with the Women's Team in the 50m rifle 3-position event.

In 2023 Stark won two gold medals at the Jakarta World Cup in the 50m rifle 3-position women's team and mixed team events.

In September 2023, she became the Swiss national champion in the 50m rifle 3-position event, setting a new national record of 460.2 in the final.

At the 2025 European Championships, Stark won silver medals in the individual and team prone rifle events, and bronze in the three-position rifle team.
