= 2025 European Shooting Championships =

Shooting tournament held in Croatia

2025 European 25m/50m/300m/Shotgun/RT Events Championships
- Location: Châteauroux, France
- Dates: 23 July – 7 August
- Competitors: 975 from 49 nations

The 2025 European Shooting Championships (2025 European 25m/50m/300m/Shotgun/RT Championships) was organised by the European Shooting Confederation (ESC) and held in French city of Châteauroux.

== Events ==
975 athletes from 49 countries will participate in the 25m/50m/300m/Shotgun/RT events.

== Medal table ==
- ISSF Events (83): 54 Senior + 29 Junior
- ESC Challenge Events (30): 15 Senior + 15 Junior (With 8 Shared Bronze)
- As with all official competitions held under the auspices of the World Federation, in events where the number of participants or teams is less than the specified number, the medals for that event will not be counted in the table. This happens in most running target (moving target) competitions and standard fire pistol, center fire pistol, rapid fire pistol and so on especially junior events and senior team events.

* Host nation (France)

Rank	Nation	Gold	Silver	Bronze	Total
1	France*	11	7	8	26
2	Norway	11	4	3	18
3	Ukraine	10	16	12	38
4	Switzerland	9	10	3	22
5	Italy	8	3	4	15
6	Individual Neutral Athletes	7	4	3	14
7	Armenia	6	7	4	17
8	Great Britain	6	3	4	13
9	Germany	5	9	8	22
10	Finland	5	3	10	18
11	Poland	4	7	5	16
12	Turkey	4	3	3	10
13	Czech Republic	3	11	15	29
14	Sweden	3	4	2	9
15	Cyprus	3	1	0	4
15	Romania	3	1	0	4
17	Spain	2	4	2	8
18	Hungary	2	3	7	12
19	Slovakia	2	2	6	10
20	Bulgaria	2	2	3	7
20	Croatia	2	2	3	7
22	Austria	1	4	2	7
23	Latvia	1	1	1	3
24	Greece	1	0	3	4
25	Denmark	1	0	1	2
26	Iceland	1	0	0	1
27	Azerbaijan	0	1	2	3
27	Estonia	0	1	2	3
29	Serbia	0	0	4	4
30	Ireland	0	0	1	1
Totals (30 entries)		113	113	121	347

== Senior ==
=== Rifle events ===
==== Men ====
Event	Gold		Silver		Bronze	
50 m Rifle 3 Positions	István Péni; Hungary	467.1	Lucas Kryzs; France	464.9	Marko Ivanović; Serbia	453.3
50 m Rifle 3 Positions Team	Jon-Hermann Hegg; Ole Martin Halvorsen; Henrik Larsen; Norway	1774-106x	Filip Nepejchal; Jiri Privratsky; David Hrckulak; Czech Republic	1772-99x	Marko Ivanović; Milenko Sebić; Lazar Kovačević; Serbia	1769-99x
50 m Rifle Prone	Jon-Hermann Hegg; Norway	624.3	Alexander Schmirl; Austria	624.0	Fabio Paul Wyrsch; Switzerland	623.3
50 m Rifle Prone Team	Jon-Hermann Hegg; Ole Martin Halvorsen; Henrik Larsen; Norway	1863.9	Fabio Paul Wyrsch; Jan Lochbihler; Christoph Dürr; Switzerland	1862.2	Patrik Jány; Ondrej Holko; Štefan Šulek; Slovakia	1859.4
300 m Rifle 3 Positions	Péter Sidi; Romania	594	Pascal Bachmann; Switzerland	592	Alexander Schmirl; Austria	591
300 m Rifle 3 Positions Team	Pascal Bachmann; Gilles Dufaux; Sandro Greuter; Switzerland	1770-81x	Max Ohlenburger; Markus Abt; David Koenders; Germany	1757-57x	Aleš Entrichel; Jiří Přívratský; Petr Nymburský; Czech Republic	1750-69x
300 m Rifle Prone	Jón Sigurðsson; Iceland	599	Alexander Schmirl; Austria	599	Aleksi Leppä; Finland	599
300 m Rifle Prone Team	Pascal Bachmann; Gilles Dufaux; Sandro Greuter; Switzerland	1786-104x	Alexander Schmirl; Dominic Einwaller; Patrick Diem; Austria	1782-90x	David Koenders; Max Ohlenburger; Markus Abt; Germany	1781-84x

==== Women ====
Event	Gold		Silver		Bronze	
50 m Rifle 3 Positions	Rikke Maeng Ibsen; Denmark	462.6	Jeanette Hegg Duestad; Norway	461.1	Agathe Girard; France	448.1
50 m Rifle 3 Positions Team	Nele Stark; Larissa Wegner; Hannah Steffen; Germany	1759-82x	Adéla Zrůstová; Veronika Blažíčková; Kateřina Štefánková; Czech Republic	1758-89x	Chiara Leone; Franziska Stark; Annina Tomaschett; Switzerland	1755-89x
50 m Rifle Prone	Marianne Palo; Finland	625.1	Franziska Stark; Switzerland	624.4	Diana Beníková; Slovakia	623.9
50 m Rifle Prone Team	Sheileen Waibel; Nadine Ungerank; Olivia Hofmann; Austria	1856.6	Franziska Stark; Anja Senti; Chiara Leone; Switzerland	1856.1	Veronika Blažíčková; Sára Karasová; Kateřina Štefánková; Czech Republic	1855.1
300 m Rifle 3 Positions	Jeanette Hegg Duestad; Norway	591	Lisa Grub; Germany	590	Agathe Girard; France	588
300 m Rifle 3 Positions Team	Jeanette Hegg Duestad; Jenny Vatne; Oda Flikkerud; Norway	1759-64x	Marta Szabo Bouza; Anja Senti; Sarina Hitz; Switzerland	1752-67x	Lisa Grub; Anna-Lena Geuther; Veronique Münster; Germany	1747-67x
300 m Rifle Prone	Anja Senti; Switzerland	596	Marta Szabo Bouza; Switzerland	595	Jenny Vatne; Norway	594
300 m Rifle Prone Team	Marta Szabo Bouza; Anja Senti; Sarina Hitz; Switzerland	1784-95x	Lisa Grub; Veronique Münster; Anna-Lena Geuther; Germany	1779-66x	Karina Kotkas; Anzela Voronova; Ljudmila Kortsagina; Estonia	1769-71x

=== Pistol events ===
==== Men ====
Event	Gold		Silver		Bronze	
25 m Standard Pistol	Lauris Strautmanis; Latvia	583	Pavlo Korostylov; Ukraine	577	Sampo Voutilainen; Finland	575
25 m Standard Pistol Team	Pavlo Korostylov; Volodymyr Pasternak; Maksym Horodynets; Ukraine	1703-46x	Lauris Strautmanis; Ernests Erbs; Emīls Vasermanis; Latvia	1693-46x	Buğra Selimzade; Aydın Güçlü; İsmail Keleş; Turkey	1685-38x
25 m Rapid Fire Pistol	Florian Peter; Germany	35	Clément Bessaguet; France	34	Jean Quiquampoix; France	29
25 m Rapid Fire Pistol Trio	Maksym Horodynets; Volodymyr Pasternak; Pavlo Korostylov; Ukraine		Antonín Tupý; Matěj Rampula; Tomáš Těhan; Czech Republic		Peeter Olesk; Nemo Tabur; Fred Raukas; Estonia	
25 m Rapid Fire Pistol Team	Clément Bessaguet; Jean Quiquampoix; Yan Chesnel; France	1754-70x	Florian Peter; Emanuel Müller; Christian Reitz; Germany	1754-62x	Matěj Rampula; Tomáš Těhan; Antonín Tupý; Czech Republic	1725-52x
25 m Center Fire Pistol	Pavlo Korostylov; Ukraine	583-26	Ruslan Lunev; Azerbaijan	583-26	Théo Moczko; France	583-21
25 m Center Fire Pistol Team	Pavlo Korostylov; Volodymyr Pasternak; Maksym Horodynets; Ukraine	1738-630x	Peeter Olesk; Nemo Tabur; Fred Raukas; Estonia	1728-43x	Théo Moczko; Yann Fridrici; Kevin Chapon; France	1726-51x
50 m Pistol	Buğra Selimzade; Turkey	559	Oleh Omelchuk; Ukraine	558	Viktor Bankin; Ukraine	556
50 m Pistol Team	Oleh Omelchuk; Viktor Bankin; Pavlo Korostylov; Ukraine	1654-17x	Buğra Selimzade; İsmail Keleş; Aydın Güçlü; Turkey	1647-24x	Uroš Kačavenda; Željko Posavec; Ivan Petričević; Croatia	1625-23x

==== Women ====
Event	Gold		Silver		Bronze	
25 m Pistol	Miroslava Mincheva; Bulgaria	36	Sylvia Steiner; Austria	34	Antoaneta Kostadinova; Bulgaria	31
25 m Pistol Team	Mathilde Lamolle; Héloïse Fourré; Camille Jedrzejewski; France	1748-65x	Antoaneta Kostadinova; Miroslava Mincheva; Lidia Nencheva; Bulgaria	1744-50x	Veronika Major; Sára Ráhel Fábián; Renáta Sike; Hungary	1730-56x
25 m Standard Pistol	Sára Ráhel Fábián; Hungary	567	Veronika Major; Hungary	564	Khanna Aliyeva; Azerbaijan	560

=== Shotgun events ===
==== Men ====
Event	Gold		Silver		Bronze	
Skeet	Ben Llewellin; Great Britain	56	Tammaro Cassandro; Italy	55	Mikola Milchev; Ukraine	46
Skeet Team	Tammaro Cassandro; Erik Pittini; Gabriele Rossetti; Italy	365	Eric Delaunay; Rémi Cloitre; Édouard Poumaillou; France	363	Ben Llewellin; Mitchell Brooker-Smith; Arran Eccleston; Great Britain	362
Trap	Massimo Fabbrizi; Italy	48	Matthew Coward-Holley; Great Britain	47	Mauro De Filippis; Italy	37
Trap Team	Massimo Fabbrizi; Mauro De Filippis; Giovanni Pellielo; Italy	366	Anton Glasnović; Giovanni Cernogoraz; Josip Glasnović; Croatia	360	Murat İlbilgi; Tolga Tunçer; Yavuz İlnam; Turkey	359

==== Women ====
Event	Gold		Silver		Bronze	
Skeet	Lucie Anastassiou; France	55	Amber Jo Rutter; Great Britain	54	Valentina Umhoefer; Germany	42
Skeet Team	Simona Scocchetti; Chiara Di Marziantonio; Martina Bartolomei; Italy	354	Hana Adámková; Barbora Šumová; Anna Šindelářová; Czech Republic	353	Danka Hrbeková; Vanesa Hocková; Monika Štibravá; Slovakia	347
Trap	Kathrin Murche; Germany	43	Zuzana Rehák-Štefečeková; Slovakia	41	Fátima Gálvez; Spain	32
Trap Team	Silvana Maria Stanco; Erica Sessa; Alessia Iezzi; Italy	353	Fátima Gálvez; Mar Molné; Beatriz Martínez; Spain	350	Sara Nummela; Satu Mäkelä-Nummela; Noora Antikainen; Finland	340

=== Running Target events ===
==== Men ====
Event	Gold		Silver		Bronze	
10 m Running Target	Emil Martinsson; Sweden	6	Aaro Vuorimaa; Finland	4	Łukasz Czapla; Poland	6 (BMM)
10 m Running Target Team	Gor Khachatryan; Hovhannes Margaryan; Hayk Minasyan; Armenia	1696-43x	Emil Martinsson; Jesper Nyberg; Pontus Thuresson; Sweden	1690-31x	József Sike; Tamás Tasi; László Boros; Hungary	1673-38x
10 m Running Target Mixed\	Gor Khachatryan; Armenia	385	Hayk Minasyan; Armenia	383	Aaro Vuorimaa; Finland	383
10 m Running Target Mixed Team	Gor Khachatryan; Hayk Minasyan; Hovhannes Margaryan; Armenia	1145-25x	Roman Berezitskyi; Denys Babliuk; Danylo Danilenko; Ukraine	1124-24x	Aaro Vuorimaa; Henri Karlsson; William Erik Wilkman; Finland	1114-24x
50 m Running Target	Hovhannes Margaryan; Armenia	591	Jesper Nyberg; Sweden	589	Tamás Tasi; Hungary	589
50 m Running Target Team	Jesper Nyberg; Emil Martinsson; Pontus Thuresson; Sweden	1740	Aaro Vuorimaa; Henri Karlsson; William Erik Wilkman; Finland	1739	Hovhannes Margaryan; Gor Khachatryan; Hayk Minasyan; Armenia	1738

==== Women ====
Event	Gold		Silver		Bronze	
10 m Running Target	Viktoriia Rybovalova; Ukraine	6	Ida Heikkilä; Finland	3	Arusyak Grigoryan; Armenia	8 (BMM)
10 m Running Target Team	Viktoriia Rybovalova; Halina Avramenko; Valentyna Honcharova; Ukraine	1656-35x	Arusyak Grigoryan; Gohar Harutyunyan; Lilit Mkrtchyan; Armenia	1656-33x	Daniela Vogelbacher; Nicola Müller-Faßbender; Eva Östreicher; Germany	1627-29x
10 m Running Target Mixed	Nicola Müller-Faßbender; Germany	378	Viktoriia Rybovalova; Ukraine	377	Ida Heikkilä; Finland	373
10 m Running Target Mixed Team	Lilit Mkrtchyan; Arusyak Grigoryan; Gohar Harutyunyan; Armenia	1103-9x	Nicola Müller-Faßbender; Daniela Vogelbacher; Eva Östreicher; Germany	1091-20x	Viktoriia Rybovalova; Halina Avramenko; Valentyna Honcharova; Ukraine	1080-19x
50 m Running Target	Ida Heikkilä; Finland	581	Halina Avramenko; Ukraine	573	Lilit Mkrtchyan; Armenia	572
50 m Running Target Team	Halina Avramenko; Viktoriia Rybovalova; Valentyna Honcharova; Ukraine	1696	Lilit Mkrtchyan; Gohar Harutyunyan; Arusyak Grigoryan; Armenia	1685	Ida Heikkilä; Aino Vaittinen; Jenni Seikkula; Finland	1666

== Junior ==
=== Pistol events ===
==== Men's ====
Event	Gold		Silver		Bronze	
25 m Standard Pistol	Thomas Clement Chinours; France	568	Ákos Károly Nagy; Hungary	563	Ivan Rakitski; Poland	561
25 m Standard Pistol Team	Thomas Clement Chinours; Hervé-Louis Le Guellaff Dumas; Thibaut Hagen; France	1683-31x	Ivan Rakitski; Tomasz Jedraszczyk; Wiktor Lukasz Kopiwoda; Poland	1659-33x	Daniels Vilcins; Arturs Martinsons; Dmitrijs Ivanovs; Latvia	1624-24x
25 m Rapid Fire Pistol	Arnaud Gamaleri; France	24	Thomas Clement Chinours; France	23	Vladyslav Medushevskyi; Ukraine	16
25 m Rapid Fire Pistol Team	Thomas Clement Chinours; Arnaud Gamaleri; Hervé-Louis Le Guellaff Dumas; France	1726-51x	Tomasz Jedraszczyk; Ivan Rakitski; Wiktor Lukasz Kopiwoda; Poland	1705-46x	Colin Hilk; Arne Schallus; Fiete Kühn; Germany	1705-32x
25 m Pistol	Georgii Tarasov; Individual Neutral Athletes	584-15x	Oleksii Tsion; Ukraine	579-19x	Viktor Todorov Bonev; Bulgaria	578-17x
25 m Pistol Team	Hervé-Louis Le Guellaff Dumas; Thomas Clement Chinours; Thibaut Hagen; France	1722-45x	Oleksii Tsion; Vladyslav Medushevskyi; Ivan Martynov; Ukraine	1720-43x	Viktor Todorov Bonev; Kaloyan Petkov; Gabriel Dryankov; Bulgaria	1719-41x
50 m Pistol	Luca Joldea; Romania	551	Adnan Efe Uçar; Turkey	542	Ivan Martynov; Ukraine	541

==== Women's ====
Event	Gold		Silver		Bronze	
25 m Pistol	Aliaksandra Piatrova; Individual Neutral Athletes	32	Aileen Pitschke; Germany	28	Katsiaryna Ivanova; Individual Neutral Athletes	24
25 m Pistol Team	Klara Tichackova; Viktorie Sindlerova; Anna Mirejovska; Czech Republic	1709-41x	Aileen Pitschke; Maxi Vogt; Svenja Gruschka; Germany	1694-37x	Nada Martinovic; Marta Novovic; Kristina Pejovic; Serbia	1691-36x
25 m Standard Pistol	Anna Pelmeneva; Individual Neutral Athletes	565	Olívia Ditta Domsits; Hungary	557	Viktoriia Kholodnaia; Individual Neutral Athletes	554

=== Shotgun events ===
==== Men's ====
Event	Gold		Silver		Bronze	
Skeet	Andreas Pontikis; Cyprus	55	Markos Kontopoulos; Cyprus	53	Efraim Nikolantonakis; Greece	41
Skeet Team	Andreas Pontikis; Markos Kontopoulos; Kleanthis Kleanthous; Cyprus	359	Matteo Bragalli; Marco Coco; Antonio Bellu; Italy	354	Magnus Erdmann; Vladislav Poddubskiy; Maximilian Alexander Seibel; Germany	352
Trap	Francesco Tanfoglio; Italy	45	Thomas Agez; France	43	Fabrizio Fisichella; Italy	32
Trap Team	Fabrizio Fisichella; Francesco Tanfoglio; Luca Gerri; Italy	358	Thomas Agez; Paul Bayard; Enzo Dury; France	354	Isaac Hernandez; Eduard Salichs; Daniel Fernandez De Vicente; Spain	348

==== Women's ====
Event	Gold		Silver		Bronze	
Skeet	Madeleine Zarina Russell; Great Britain	54	Varvara Zaitseva; Individual Neutral Athletes	53	Phoebe Bodley-Scott; Great Britain	42
Skeet Team	Madeleine Zarina Russell; Phoebe Bodley-Scott; Bethany Lilian Norton; Great Britain	350	Eleonora Ruta; Arianna Nember; Dalia Buselli; Italy	347	Tereza Mlikova; Eliska Luskova; Valerie Moravcova; Czech Republic	335
Trap	Noelia Pontes Villarrubia; Spain	40	Irene Del Rey Ruiz; Spain	39	Martina Montani; Italy	29
Trap Team	Maria Maccioni; Sofia Gori; Martina Montani; Italy	348	Irene Del Rey Ruiz; Dana Navarro Puga; Noelia Pontes Villarrubia; Spain	338	Chloe Dutang; Jeanne Auriche; Olga Niellen-Dezecache; France	330

=== Running Target events ===
==== Men ====
Event	Gold	Silver	Bronze
50 m Running Target Mixed			

==== Women ====
Event	Gold		Silver		Bronze	
10 m Running Target	Aida Azatyan; Armenia	7	Lilit Mkrtchyan; Armenia	5	Oleksandra Martyniuk; Ukraine	6 (BMM)
10 m Running Target Team	Aida Azatyan; Lilit Mkrtchyan; Anahit Sargsyan; Armenia	1583-16x	Oleksandra Martyniuk; Diana Poplavska; Alina Tkalyk; Ukraine	1579-22x	Not awarded	
10 m Running Target Mixed	Oleksandra Martyniuk; Ukraine	371	Aida Azatyan; Armenia	369	Aino Amanda Vaittinen; Finland	355
10 m Running Target Mixed Team	Aida Azatyan; Lilit Mkrtchyan; Anahit Sargsyan; Armenia	1074-17x	Oleksandra Martyniuk; Alina Tkalyk; Diana Poplavska; Ukraine	1070-17x	Not awarded	
50 m Running Target Mixed						

== See also ==
- 2025 European 10 m Events Championships
