= Miao Wanru =

Chinese sport shooter

Personal information
- Nationality: Chinese
- Born: 16 May 2000 (age 26)

Sport
- Sport: Sports shooting
Medal record
Representing China
World Championships
Gold medal – first place	2022 Cairo	50 m rifle 3 positions
Gold medal – first place	2025 Cairo	50 m rifle 3 positions team
Bronze medal – third place	2022 Cairo	50 m rifle 3 positions team

Miao Wanru (born 16 May 2000) is a Chinese sports shooter. She won two medals in air rifle events at the 2022 ISSF World Shooting Championships.
