= Dariya Sharipova =

Ukrainian sport shooter

Personal information
- Nationality: Ukrainian
- Born: Шаріпова Дар'я Сергіївна; 4 June 1990 (age 36) Cherkasy, Ukrainian SSR, Soviet Union

Sport
- Sport: Sports shooting
Medal record
Women's shooting
Representing Ukraine
European Championships
Gold medal – first place	2017 Baku	50m rifle prone team
Silver medal – second place	2017 Baku	50m rifle prone

Dariya Sharipova (born 4 June 1990) is a Ukrainian sports shooter. She competed at the 2008 and 2012 Summer Olympics, and won a silver medal at the 2017 European Championships in the 50m rifle prone event.
