= Filip Nepejchal =

Czech sport shooter (born 1999)

Personal information
- Born: 8 July 1999 (age 27) Kolín, Czech Republic
- Height: 1.77 m (5 ft 10 in)
- Weight: 70 kg (150 lb)

Sport
- Country: Czech Republic
- Sport: Sport shooting
- Club: SKP Rapid Plzeň
Medal record
World Championships
Gold medal – first place	2026 Doha	50 m rifle 3 positions team
Silver medal – second place	2026 Doha	50 m rifle prone team
European Games
Bronze medal – third place	2019 Minsk	10 m air rifle
Bronze medal – third place	2019 Minsk	10 m air rifle mixed team
European Championships
Gold medal – first place	2024 Osijek	50 m rifle 3 positions team
Gold medal – first place	2025 Osijek	10 m air rifle team
Silver medal – second place	2019 Bologna	50 m rifle 3 positions
Silver medal – second place	2019 Bologna	50 m rifle 3 positions team
Silver medal – second place	2024 Osijek	50 m rifle prone team
Silver medal – second place	2025 Châteauroux	50 m rifle 3 positions team
World Junior Championships
Silver medal – second place	2017 Suhl	50 m rifle 3 positions
European Junior Championships
Gold medal – first place	2017 Baku	50 m rifle 3 positions
Silver medal – second place	2017 Baku	50 m rifle 3 positions team
Silver medal – second place	2018 Győr	10 m rifle

Filip Nepejchal (born 8 July 1999) is a Czech sport shooter. He competed in the men's 10 metre air rifle event at the 2016 Summer Olympics.

Awards
Preceded by Michaela Hrubá	Czech Junior Athlete of the Year; 2017 (with Michaela Hrubá)	Succeeded by Barbora Seemanová
