= Sarina Hitz =

Swiss sport shooter (born 2000)

Personal information
- National team: Switzerland
- Citizenship: Swiss
- Born: Sarina Hitz; 5 September 2000 (age 25) Mauren, Switzerland
- Home town: Mauren, Switzerland
- Occupation(s): Carpenter, Sport Shooter

Sport
- Country: Switzerland
- Sport: Shooting
- Events: 10 meter air rifle; 50 meter rifle prone; 50 meter rifle three positions; 300 metre rifle prone; 300 metre rifle three positions
- Club: SG Mauren-Berg
Medal record
Women's shooting
Representing Switzerland
World Championships
Silver medal – second place	2022 Cairo	50m Rifle Prone
Silver medal – second place	2022 Cairo	50m Rifle Prone - Women's Team
Silver medal – second place	2022 Cairo	300m Rifle Prone - Women's Team
Silver medal – second place	2022 Cairo	300m Rifle 3-Position
Silver medal – second place	2022 Cairo	300m Rifle 3-Position - Women's Team
Gold medal – first place	2023 Baku	50m Rifle Prone - Women's Team
Silver medal – second place	2023 Baku	50m Rifle Prone - Mixed Team
World Cup
Gold medal – first place	2023 Jakarta	50m Rifle 3-Positions - Women's Team
Silver medal – second place	2023 Jakarta	50m Rifle 3-Positions - Mixed Team
Bronze medal – third place	2023 Jakarta	50m Rifle Prone
European Championships
Gold medal – first place	2025 Châteauroux	300 m Rifle Prone Team
Silver medal – second place	2025 Châteauroux	300 m Rifle 3 Positions Team
European Games
Silver medal – second place	2023 Wrocław	50m Rifle 3-Positions - Women's Team

Sarina Hitz (born 5 September 2000) is a Swiss sports shooter. As of October 2023, she has won two individual medals and five team medals at ISSF World Championships, as well as three medals at ISSF World Cups.

== Sporting career ==
Sarina began shooting 2010, and started competing internationally in 2017.

In 2022, Hitz won five silver medals at the ISSF World Championships in Cairo. She placed second in the women's 50m prone rifle, and the 300m 3-position rifle. Her individual performances helped the Swiss women's team take silver in the same events, as well as the 300m prone rifle.

In 2023 her training focused on 50metre shooting, as 300metre rifle has not been contested at the Olympics since 1972. Hitz won three World Cup medals at the 2023 Jakarta World Cup.

In June at the 2023 European Games in Wrocław, Hitz won a Silver medal in the 50m 3-position team event.

In August at the 2023 ISSF World Championships in Baku, Hitz won a gold medal in the 50m Prone Rifle women's team, and a silver medal in the 50m Prone rifle mixed team with Christoph Dürr.

At the 2025 European Shooting Championships, Hitz won the 300m Rifle Prone Team event with teammates Marta Szabo and Anja Senti.
