= Stefan Rumpler =

Austrian sport shooter

Personal information
- Nationality: Austrian
- Born: 17 September 1992 (age 33) Mittersill, Austria
- Height: 1.88 m (6 ft 2 in)
- Weight: 88 kg (194 lb)

Sport
- Country: Austria
- Sport: Shooting
- Event: Air rifle
- Club: K.U.K. Priv. SV Mittersill
Medal record
World Championships
Gold medal – first place	2018 Changwon	300 m team rifle 3 positions

Stefan Rumpler (born 17 September 1992) is an Austrian sport shooter.

He participated at the 2018 ISSF World Shooting Championships, winning a medal.
