= Chiara Leone =

Swiss sport shooter (born 1998)

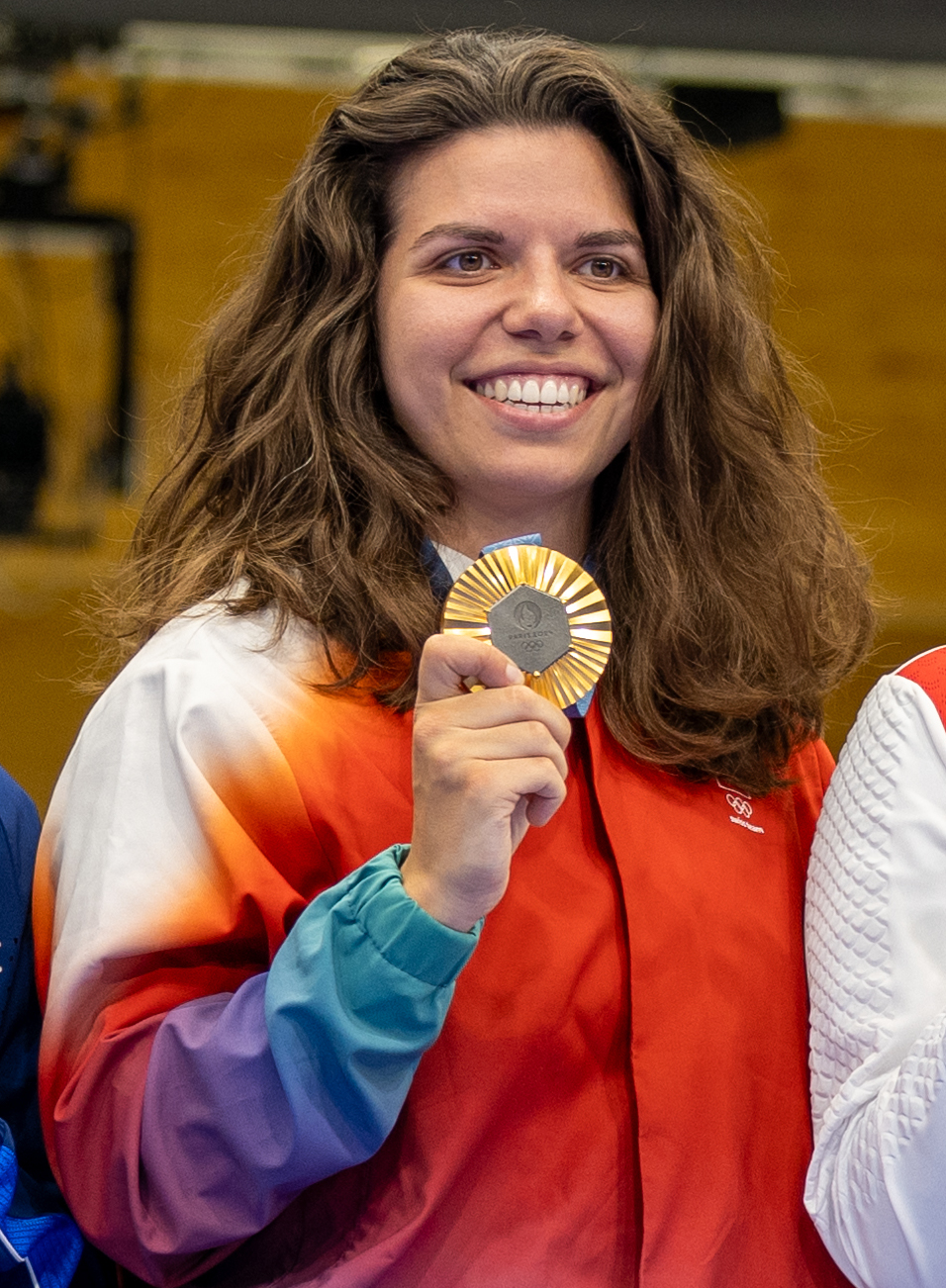
- Leone holding her gold medal at the 2024 Summer Olympics

Personal information
- National team: Switzerland
- Citizenship: Swiss
- Born: Chiara Leone; June 15, 1998 (age 28)
- Home town: Frick, Switzerland
- Occupation: Sport Shooter
- Website: www.chiaraleone.ch

Sport
- Country: Switzerland
- Sport: Shooting
- Events: 10 meter air rifle; 50 meter rifle prone; 50 meter rifle three positions
- Club: SPS Frick
- Coached by: Enrico Friedemann
Medal record
Women's shooting
Representing Switzerland
Olympic Games
Gold medal – first place	2024 Paris	50 m rifle 3 positions
World Championships
Gold medal – first place	2023 Baku	50 m rifle prone team
Gold medal – first place	2023 Baku	50 m rifle prone mixed team
Gold medal – first place	2026 Doha	50 m rifle prone team
Silver medal – second place	2026 Doha	50 m rifle 3 positions team
World Cup
Bronze medal – third place	2022 Cairo	50 m rifle 3 positions team
Bronze medal – third place	2022 Rio de Janeiro	50 m rifle 3 positions team
Gold medal – first place	2023 Jakarta	50 m rifle 3 positions team
Silver medal – second place	2024 Cairo	50 m rifle 3 positions
European Games
Gold medal – first place	2023 Kraków-Małopolska	10 m air rifle team
Silver medal – second place	2023 Kraków-Małopolska	50 m rifle 3 positions team
European Championships
Bronze medal – third place	2022 Hamar	10 m air rifle mixed team
Bronze medal – third place	2022 Wrocław	50 m rifle prone mixed team
Gold medal – first place	2024 Osijek	50 m rifle 3 positions
Gold medal – first place	2024 Osijek	50 m rifle 3 positions team
Silver medal – second place	2024 Osijek	50 m rifle prone team
Silver medal – second place	2025 Châteauroux	50 m rifle prone team
Bronze medal – third place	2025 Châteauroux	50 m rifle 3 positions team

Chiara Leone (born 15 June 1998) is a Swiss sports shooter and Olympic champion. At the 2024 Paris Olympic Games, she won the Women's 50m Three Position Rifle event. She has won two team medals at ISSF World Championships, as well as three medals at ISSF World Cups. She became European Champion in the 50m Rifle Three-Position event at the 2024 European Championships in Osijek.

== Sporting career ==
Leone began shooting in 2007.

In 2022, Leone won World Cup medals at the Cairo and Rio de Janeiro ISSF World Cups. She won a bronze medal at the 2022 European Championships in the 10m Air Rifle Mixed Team event with Jan Lochbihler.

At the 2023 European Games in Wrocław, she won a silver medal in the 50m 3-position team event.

At the 2023 ISSF World Championships in Baku, Leone won a gold medal in the 50m Prone Rifle women's team, and a gold medal in the 50m Prone rifle mixed team with Jan Lochbihler.

In January 2024, Leone won her first individual World Cup medal, winning silver in the Women's 50m Three Position Rifle at the Cairo World Cup

In May 2024, Leone became European Champion in the 50m Three Position Rifle at the ESC 25/50/300M Championships in Osijek.

At the 2024 Olympic Games in Paris, Leone won the women's 50 metre 3 position rifle.
