= Agathe Girard =

French sport shooter (born 2001)

Personal information
- National team: France
- Citizenship: French
- Born: Agathe Cecile Camille Girard; February 23, 2001 (age 25)
- Home town: Blois
- Occupations: Sport Shooter, Student

Sport
- Country: France
- Sport: Shooting
- Events: 10 meter air rifle; 50 meter rifle prone; 50 meter rifle three positions; 300 metre rifle prone; 300 metre rifle three positions
- Club: ADA Blois
Medal record
Women's shooting
Representing France
World Championships
| Bronze medal – third place | 2021 Lima | 10m Air Rifle - Women's Team |
| Bronze medal – third place | 2023 Baku | 300m Rifle Prone |
European Championships
| Bronze medal – third place | 2025 Châteauroux | 50 m Rifle 3 Positions |
| Bronze medal – third place | 2025 Châteauroux | 300 m Rifle 3 Positions |

Agathe Cecile Camille Girard (born 23 February 2001) is a target shooter from France. She has won bronze at two ISSF World Championships.

== Personal life ==
Girard studied sport science in Lille, and is a student of Life Sciences at Sorbonne University in Paris.

== Sporting career ==
Agathe has been active in international shooting since 2018. She was selected to represent France at the ISSF Junior World Cups in Suhl in 2018 and 2019.

In 2021 she was selected for the ISSF Junior World Championships in Lima, where she won a Bronze medal in the 10m Air Rifle Team event.

In 2022 she won silver in the 50m Three Position Rifle event at the French 50 metre Championships. She went on to become French Champion in 300m Prone Rifle.

This performance earned her selection for the 2023 ISSF World Shooting Championships, winning an individual Bronze medal in the 300m Prone Rifle.
