= Anja Bachmann-Senti =

Swiss sport shooter (born 1996)

Personal information
- National team: Switzerland
- Citizenship: Swiss
- Born: Anja Senti; September 28, 1996 (age 29)
- Occupation: Sport Shooter
- Website: anjasenti.ch

Sport
- Country: Switzerland
- Sport: Shooting
- Events: 50 meter rifle prone; 50 meter rifle three positions; 300 metre rifle prone; 300 metre rifle three positions
- Coached by: Jan Hollenweger
Medal record
Women's shooting
Representing Switzerland
World Championships
| Gold medal – first place | 2022 Cairo | 300m Rifle Prone |
| Silver medal – second place | 2022 Cairo | 300m Rifle Prone - Women's Team |
| Silver medal – second place | 2022 Cairo | 300m Rifle 3-Position - Women's Team |
| Gold medal – first place | 2023 Baku | 50m Rifle Prone |
| Gold medal – first place | 2023 Baku | 50m Rifle Prone - Women's Team |
| Gold medal – first place | 2023 Baku | 300m Rifle Prone - Women's Team |
| Silver medal – second place | 2023 Baku | 300m Rifle 3-Position - Women's Team |
| Gold medal – first place | 2025 Cairo | 300 m rifle prone |
European Championships
| Gold medal – first place | 2026 Osijek | 300 m Rifle Prone |
| Gold medal – first place | 2025 Châteauroux | 300 m Rifle Prone |
| Gold medal – first place | 2025 Châteauroux | 300 m Rifle Prone Team |
| Silver medal – second place | 2021 Osijek | 300m Rifle 3-Positions - Women's Team |
| Silver medal – second place | 2021 Osijek | 300m Rifle 3-Positions - Mixed Team |
| Silver medal – second place | 2025 Châteauroux | 50 m Rifle Prone Team |
| Silver medal – second place | 2025 Châteauroux | 300 m Rifle 3 Positions Team |
| Bronze medal – third place | 2021 Osijek | 300m Rifle Prone |

Anja Bachmann-Senti (née Senti; born 28 September 1996) is a target shooter from Switzerland. She has won individual titles at two ISSF World Championships. In April 2026 she married teammate Pascal Bachmann.

== Personal life ==
Anja has a diploma in Architecture. In April 2026, she married Swiss shooter Pascal Bachmann.

== Sporting career ==
Anja began shooting in 2006.

In 2021, she won two silver medals in team events at the European Shooting Championships in Osijek. She won an individual bronze medal in the women's 300m prone rifle.

At the 2022 World Championships, she won the women's 300m prone rifle event. With Sarina Hitz and Silvia Guignard, she won silver in the women's team events for 300m prone rifle and 300m 3-Position Rifle.

At the 2023 Lapua European Cup in Eskilstuna, Senti won the Women's 300metre prone match with a score of 597, ahead of Seonaid McIntosh.

At the 2023 ISSF World Championships in Baku, Senti became world champion in the women's 50m prone rifle event, also winning the team event alongside Sarina Hitz and Chiara Leone. Alongside Guignard Schnyder and Michele Bertschi she won the women's 300m prone rifle team event and earned silver in the women's 300m 3-Position Rifle team event.

At the 2025 European Shooting Championships, Senti won the 300m Rifle Prone Individual and Team events with teammates Marta Szabo and Sarina Hitz. She went on to win silver medals in the 300m Rifle 3-Position Team and 50m rifle prone team events.

At the 2025 ISSF World Shooting Championships Senti became World Champion for the second time in the 300m prone rifle event.

At the 2026 European 300 m Rifle Championships Senti retained her European title.
