= Rikke Ibsen =

Danish sport shooter (born 1990)

Personal information
- Full name: Rikke Mæng Ibsen
- Nationality: Danish
- Born: 30 November 1990 (age 35) Herning, Denmark
- Height: 1.66 m (5 ft 5 in)

Sport
- Country: Denmark
- Sport: Shooting
- Event: Air rifle
- Club: Trehoje
Medal record
Women's shooting
Representing Denmark
World Championships
Silver medal – second place	2018 Changwon	50 m team rifle prone
Silver medal – second place	2018 Changwon	50 m team rifle 3 positions
Silver medal – second place	2025 Cairo	50 m rifle prone team
Bronze medal – third place	2026 Doha	50m Rifle Prone - Women's Team
World Cup Final
Silver medal – second place	2021 Wroclaw	10 m air rifle mixed team
Bronze medal – third place	2022 Cairo	50 m rifle 3 positions
World Cup
Gold medal – first place	2022 Baku	50 m rifle 3 positions
Gold medal – first place	2021 New Delhi	10 m air rifle team
Silver medal – second place	2022 Baku	10 m air rifle team
Bronze medal – third place	2018 Munich	10 m air rifle
Bronze medal – third place	2023 Jakarta	50 m rifle 3 positions
European Championships
Gold medal – first place	2022 Wrocław	50 m rifle 3 positions
Gold medal – first place	2025 Châteauroux	50 m Rifle 3 Positions
Silver medal – second place	2018 Győr	10 m rifle team

Rikke Mæng Ibsen (born 30 November 1990) is a Danish sport shooter.

She participated at the 2018 ISSF World Shooting Championships, winning a medal.
