= Lisa Müller =

German sport shooter (born 1992)

Personal information
- Nationality: German
- Born: 20 September 1992 (age 33) Weingarten, Germany
- Height: 1.75 m (5 ft 9 in)

Sport
- Country: Germany
- Sport: Shooting
- Event(s): Air rifle Rifle
- Club: SV Berg
Medal record
World Championships
Gold medal – first place	2014 Granada	10 m air rifle team
Gold medal – first place	2018 Changwon	300 m rifle 3 positions
Gold medal – first place	2018 Changwon	300 m rifle 3 positions team
Gold medal – first place	2018 Changwon	300 m rifle prone team
Gold medal – first place	2022 Cairo	50 m rifle 3 positions team
Bronze medal – third place	2023 Cairo	300 m rifle prone team
Bronze medal – third place	2023 Cairo	300 m rifle 3 positions team
Bronze medal – third place	2023 Baku	10 m air rifle team
Bronze medal – third place	2023 Baku	300 m rifle prone team
Bronze medal – third place	2023 Baku	300 m rifle 3 positions team
European Games
Bronze medal – third place	2023 Kraków-Małopolska	50 m rifle 3 positions team
European Championships
Gold medal – first place	2015 Maribor	300 m rifle 3 positions
Gold medal – first place	2015 Maribor	300 m rifle 3 positions team
Gold medal – first place	2015 Maribor	300 m rifle prone
Gold medal – first place	2019 Bologna	300 m rifle 3 positions
Gold medal – first place	2022 Wrocław	50 m rifle 3 positions team
Silver medal – second place	2015 Maribor	300 m rifle prone team
Silver medal – second place	2017 Baku	300 m rifle prone team
Silver medal – second place	2017 Baku	300 m rifle 3 positions
Silver medal – second place	2019 Bologna	300 m rifle prone team
World Cups
Gold medal – first place	2022 Rio de Janeiro	10 m air rifle team
Gold medal – first place	2022 Changwon	50 m rifle 3 positions team
Bronze medal – third place	2023 Cairo	10 m air rifle mixed
Bronze medal – third place	2023 Baku	50 m rifle 3 positions
Bronze medal – third place	2023 Doha	50 m rifle 3 positions

Lisa Müller (born 20 September 1992) is a German sport shooter and five times world champion.

== Career ==
Lisa Müller was introduced to shooting sports by her parents and gained experience with air rifle, small bore, and large bore at an early age. She started shooting at the age of ten, with her father as her coach and her mother as her mental mentor. In 2014, Müller won her first world championship title in the 10-metre air rifle team discipline with Sonja Pfeilschifter and Barbara Engleder at the World Shooting Championships in Granada. One year later, she achieved three gold medals at Maribor's 2015 European Shooting Championships. Now a sports soldier, she went on to win three gold medals at the 2018 World Shooting Championships in Changwon in the disciplines of 300 m free rifle three-position competition, 300 m free rifle three-position competition team, and 300 m free rifle prone team.

At the 2023 Shooting World Championships in Baku, Müller achieved third place three times, but finished ninth in the small-bore three-position competition and missed out on the final, in which only the best eight female shooters took part. In retrospect, however, she found out that she had won the Olympic quota place and thus qualified for the Olympic Games in Paris. There, she missed the final after 60 shots with 626.5 rings with the air rifle and finished 25th.
