= Dimitris Konstantinou =

Greek footballer

Personal information
- Date of birth: 6 January 1989 (age 37)
- Place of birth: Athens, Greece
- Height: 1.79 m (5 ft 10 1/2 in)
- Position: Defensive midfielder

Team information
- Current team: Ethnikos Piraeus

Youth career
- Atromitos

Senior career*
Years	Team	Apps	(Gls)
2008–2013	Apollon Smyrnis	98	(2)
2013	A.O Pefki	9	(0)
2013–2015	Malchower SV	42	(3)
2015–2016	Pierikos	24	(0)
2016–2017	Rodos	22	(0)
2017–	Ethnikos Piraeus	0	(0)
- * Club domestic league appearances and goals

Dimitris Konstantinou (Greek: Δημήτρης Κωνσταντίνου; born 6 January 1989) is a Greek footballer, who currently plays for Ethnikos Piraeus in the Football League 2 as a defensive midfielder.

He started his career in the academies of Atromitos, before he got his transfer to Apollon Smyrnis. After 5 years, he got a transfer to A.O Pefki, but after 6 months, he left the club and joined the German team Malchower SV. He stayed there for 2.5 years before he returned to Greece for 2016–17 season with Rodos. In July 2017, he was transferred to Ethnikos Piraeus.
