= Volodymyr Pasternak =

Ukrainian sport shooter

Personal information
- Nationality: Ukrainian
- Born: 6 November 1989 (age 37)
- Height: 1.76 m (5 ft 9 in)
- Weight: 80 kg (176 lb)

Sport
- Country: Ukraine
- Sport: Shooting
- Event: Air pistol
- Club: Dynamo
Medal record
World Championships
Gold medal – first place	2026 Doha	25 m centre fire pistol team
Bronze medal – third place	2018 Changwon	25 m standard pistol team
Bronze medal – third place	2026 Doha	25 m standard pistol team
European Championships
Gold medal – first place	2017 Baku	25 m standard pistol team
Gold medal – first place	2017 Baku	25 m center fire pistol team
Gold medal – first place	2019 Bologna	25 m center fire pistol team
Gold medal – first place	2022 Wrocław	25 m rapid fire pistol mixed team
Gold medal – first place	2025 Châteauroux	25 m Standard Pistol Team
Gold medal – first place	2025 Châteauroux	25 m Center Fire Pistol Team
Gold medal – first place	2026 Osijek	25 m Standard Pistol
Silver medal – second place	2015 Maribor	25 m rapid fire pistol team
Silver medal – second place	2019 Bologna	25 m standard pistol team
Silver medal – second place	2021 Osijek	25 m rapid fire pistol team
Silver medal – second place	2021 Osijek	25 m rapid fire pistol mixed team
Bronze medal – third place	2017 Baku	25 m rapid fire pistol team
Bronze medal – third place	2019 Bologna	25 m rapid fire pistol team

Volodymyr Pasternak (born 6 November 1989) is a Ukrainian sport shooter.

He participated at the 2018 ISSF World Shooting Championships, winning a medal.
