= Daniel Romańczyk =

Polish sport shooter

Personal information
- Nationality: Polish
- Born: 28 April 1985 (age 41)

Sport
- Country: Poland
- Sport: Shooting
- Event: Air rifle
Medal record
World Championships
| Silver medal – second place | 2018 Changwon | 300 m rifle prone |
| Silver medal – second place | 2023 Baku | 300 m rifle prone team |
| Bronze medal – third place | 2022 Cairo | 300 m rifle prone team |
| Bronze medal – third place | 2022 Cairo | 300 m rifle prone mixed team |

Daniel Romańczyk (born 28 April 1985) is a Polish sport shooter.

He participated at the 2018 ISSF World Shooting Championships, winning a medal.
