= Remi Moreno Flores =

French sport shooter

Personal information
- Nationality: French
- Born: 13 November 1988 (age 37) Créteil, France
- Height: 1.85 m (6 ft 1 in)
- Weight: 73 kg (161 lb)

Sport
- Country: France
- Sport: Shooting
- Event: 50m rifle prone, 300m rifle prone
- Club: ST Petite Rosselle
Medal record
World Championships
Gold medal – first place	2018 Changwon	300 m team rifle prone

Remi Moreno Flores (born 13 November 1988) is a French sport shooter.

He participated at the 2018 ISSF World Shooting Championships, winning a gold medal.
