= Florian Peter =

German sports shooter

Personal information
- Nationality: German
- Born: 27 January 2000 (age 26)

Sport
- Sport: Sports shooting
- Club: SV St. Hubertus e.V. Klein-Welzheim
Medal record
Men's shooting
Representing Germany
World Championships
Gold medal – first place	2023 Baku	25 m center fire pistol team
Gold medal – first place	2025 Cairo	25 m rapid fire pistol team
Gold medal – first place	2026 Doha	25 m rapid fire pistol
Silver medal – second place	2023 Baku	25 m rapid fire pistol team
Silver medal – second place	2023 Baku	25 m standard pistol team
Silver medal – second place	2026 Doha	25 m rapid fire pistol team
	2023 Baku	25 m rapid fire pistol
Bronze medal – third place	2023 Baku	25 m center fire pistol
European Championships
Gold medal – first place	2025 Châteauroux	25 m Rapid Fire Pistol
Silver medal – second place	2025 Châteauroux	25 m Rapid Fire Pistol Team

Florian Peter (born 27 January 2000) is a German sports shooter. He won a bronze medal in 25 m rapid fire pistol at the 2023 ISSF World Shooting Championships.

He won the 2023 ISSF World Cup final.
