= Michael d'Halluin =

French sport shooter

Personal information
- Nationality: French
- Born: 17 September 1990 (age 35) Lesquin, France
- Height: 1.70 m (5 ft 7 in)
- Weight: 62 kg (137 lb)

Sport
- Country: France
- Sport: Shooting
- Event: Air rifle
- Club: Haubourdin
Medal record
World Championships
Gold medal – first place	2018 Changwon	300 m team rifle prone
Bronze medal – third place	2018 Changwon	300 m team rifle 3 positions

Michael d'Halluin (born 17 September 1990) is a French sport shooter.

He participated at the 2018 ISSF World Shooting Championships, winning a medal.
