= Eszter Mészáros =

Hungarian sports shooter (born 2002)

Personal information
- Nationality: Hungarian
- Born: 29 June 2002 (age 23)

Sport
- Sport: Sports shooting
Medal record
Representing Hungary
European Games
Gold medal – first place	2023 Kraków-Małopolska	10 m air rifle mixed team
European Championships
Silver medal – second place	2025 Osijek	10 m air rifle team
Bronze medal – third place	2024 Győr	10 m air rifle team

Eszter Mészáros (born 29 June 2002) is a Hungarian sports shooter. She competed in the women's 10 metre air rifle event at the 2020 Summer Olympics.
