= Mélanie Couzy =

French sports shooter

Personal information
- Nationality: French
- Born: 19 February 1990 (age 36) Romorantin, France

Sport
- Sport: Sports shooting

Mélanie Couzy (born 19 February 1990) is a French sports shooter. She competed in the women's trap event at the 2020 Summer Olympics.
