= Karl Olsson =

Swedish sports shooter

Personal information
- Nationality: Swedish
- Born: 19 November 1981 (age 44) Torsås
- Height: 1.79 m (5 ft 10 in)
- Weight: 73 kg (161 lb)

Sport
- Country: Sweden
- Sport: Shooting
- Event(s): 300 m Standard Rifle, 300 m 3x40, 300 m 60 prone, 50 m 3x40, 50 m 60 prone, 10 m air rifle
- Club: Bromma-Solna
Medal record
World Championships
Silver medal – second place	2018 Changwon	300 m standard rifle

Karl Olsson (born 19 November 1981) is a Swedish sport shooter.

He participated at the 2018 ISSF World Shooting Championships, winning a medal.
