= Gilles Dufaux =

Swiss sport shooter

Personal information
- Full name: Gilles Vincent Dufaux
- Nationality: Swiss
- Born: 13 December 1994 (age 31)
- Height: 174 cm (5 ft 9 in)
- Weight: 65 kg (143 lb)

Sport
- Country: Switzerland
- Sport: Shooting
- Event: Rifle
- Club: Fribourg
Medal record
World Championships
Gold medal – first place	2023 Baku	300 m rifle 3 positions team
Gold medal – first place	2025 Cairo	300 m rifle 3 positions team
Silver medal – second place	2018 Changwon	300 m rifle prone team
Silver medal – second place	2018 Changwon	300 m rifle 3 positions team
Silver medal – second place	2022 Cario	300 m rifle prone team
Silver medal – second place	2022 Cario	300 m rifle 3 positions team
Silver medal – second place	2023 Baku	300 m standard rifle open team
Silver medal – second place	2025 Cairo	300 m rifle prone team
Bronze medal – third place	2018 Changwon	300 m standard rifle team
Bronze medal – third place	2018 Changwon	300 m rifle 3 positions
Bronze medal – third place	2023 Baku	300 m rifle prone team
European Championships
Gold medal – first place	2025 Châteauroux	300 m Rifle 3 Positions Team
Gold medal – first place	2025 Châteauroux	300 m Rifle Prone Team

Gilles Vincent Dufaux (born 13 December 1994) is a Swiss sport shooter.

He participated at the 2018 ISSF World Shooting Championships, winning a medal. He also participated in the 2017 European Shooting Championships in Baku, Azerbaijan, winning a medal.

At the 55th World Military Shooting Championships in Norway, Dufaux set a new CISM record in the 300m Military Rifle Rapid Fire team event where Switzerland won silver. The next day he took silver in the individual match. In the 300M Standard Rifle 3-Position event he won individual bronze, earning him the overall title of Best Male Rifle Shooter. This performance saw Dufaux named CISM Male Athlete of the Year 2025.

At the 2025 European Shooting Championships, Dufux won two team gold medals in the 300m events alongside Pascal Bachmann and Sandro Greuter.

Dufaux went on to win two gold medals at the 300m European Cup in Zagreb.
