= Paula Wrońska =

Polish sports shooter

Personal information
- Born: 1 December 1991 (age 34) Lębork, Poland

Sport
- Sport: Sports shooting

Paula Wrońska (born 1 December 1991) is a Polish sports shooter. She competed in the Women's 10 metre air rifle event at the 2012 Summer Olympics.

== Olympic results ==
Event	2012
10 metre air rifle	47th 390
