= Bernhard Pickl =

Austrian sport shooter (born 1991)

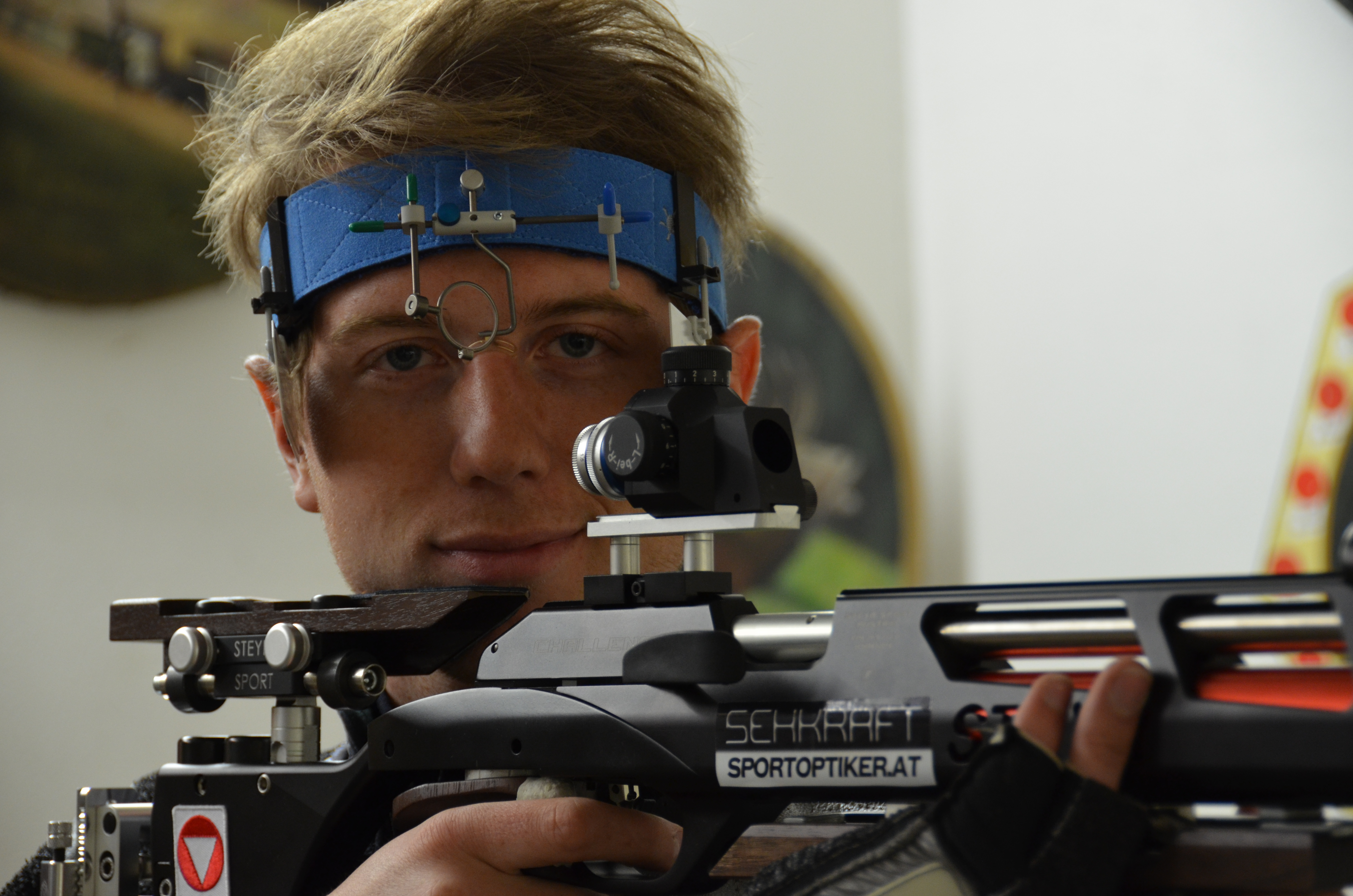

Personal information
- Nationality: Austrian
- Born: 3 March 1991 (age 35) Scheibbs, Austria
- Height: 1.84 m (6 ft 0 in)
- Weight: 82 kg (181 lb)

Sport
- Country: Austria
- Sport: Shooting
- Event: Air rifle
- Club: SV Gaming
Medal record
World Championships
Gold medal – first place	2018 Changwon	300 m team rifle 3 positions
Gold medal – first place	2023 Baku	300 m standard rifle open team
Silver medal – second place	2023 Baku	300 m rifle 3 positions team
Silver medal – second place	2025 Cairo	300 m rifle 3 positions team
Bronze medal – third place	2022 Cairo	300 m rifle 3 positions team
Bronze medal – third place	2022 Cairo	300 m rifle 3 positions mixed team
Bronze medal – third place	2025 Cairo	300 m standard rifle

Bernhard Pickl (born 3 March 1991) is an Austrian sport shooter.

He participated at the 2018 ISSF World Shooting Championships, winning a medal.

Current world records held in 300 m Standard Rifle
Men	Individual	591	Bernhard Pickl (AUT)	September 25, 2019	Tolmezzo (ITA)
