= Elin Åhlin =

Swedish sport shooter (born 1990)

Elin Ahlin
Personal information
- Nationality: Swedish
- Born: 15 December 1990 (age 35)

Sport
- Country: Sweden
- Sport: Shooting
- Event: Air rifle
Medal record
World Championships
Bronze medal – third place	2018 Changwon	300 m rifle 3 positions

Elin Ahlin (born 15 December 1990) is a Swedish sport shooter.

She participated at the 2018 ISSF World Shooting Championships, winning a medal.
