= 2019 European Shooting Championships =

International sport shooting competition

- Dates: 12 – 27 September
- Host city: Bologna/Tolmezzo, Italy
- Level: Senior
- Events: 53; 10 men + 5 women (individual); 10 men + 5 women + 3 mixed (team)

The 2019 European Shooting Championships were held in Bologna and Tolmezzo, Italy from 12 to 23 September 2019.

Pistol and rifle competitions were held in Bologna from 11 September to 23 September, and 300 m rifle competitions were held in Tolmezzo from 22 to 27 September. Previously in Lonato del Garda from 3 to 17 September the 2019 European Shotgun Championships had taken place with regard to shotgun competitions (trap, skeet and double trap).

== Medal table ==
* Host nation (Italy)

Rank	Nation	Gold	Silver	Bronze	Total
1	Germany	10	9	8	27
2	Russia	9	6	5	20
3	Norway	7	1	5	13
4	Switzerland	5	3	6	14
5	France	4	6	3	13
6	Ukraine	3	4	7	14
7	Italy*	2	9	1	12
8	Czech Republic	2	6	0	8
9	Poland	2	0	2	4
10	Hungary	1	3	6	10
11	Sweden	1	2	4	7
12	Austria	1	1	2	4
13	Turkey	1	1	0	2
14	Bulgaria	1	0	1	2
14	Great Britain	1	0	1	2
14	Latvia	1	0	1	2
17	Azerbaijan	1	0	0	1
18	Belarus	0	1	0	1
Totals (18 entries)		52	52	52	156

== Men's events ==
=== Pistol ===
Event	Gold	Silver	Bronze
25m Standard Pistol	Pavlo Korostylov (UKR)	Yusuf Dikeç (TUR)	Christian Reitz (GER)
25m Standard Pistol Team	Turkey; Yusuf Dikeç; Murat Kilic; Yavuz Keskin	Ukraine; Pavlo Korostylov; Volodymyr Pasternak; Maksym Horodynets	Germany; Christian Reitz; Mathias Putzmann; Oliver Geis
25m Rapid Fire Pistol	Ricardo Mazzetti (ITA)	Christian Reitz (GER)	Nikita Sukhanov (RUS)
25m Rapid Fire Pistol Team	France; Clement Bessaguet; Jean Quiquampoix; Boris Artaud	Germany; Christian Reitz; Oliver Geis; Mathian Putzmann	Ukraine; Pavlo Korostylov; Oleksandr Petriv; Volodymyr Pasternak
25m Center Fire Pistol	Ruslan Lunev (AZE)	Pavlo Korostylov (UKR)	Christian Reitz (GER)
25m Center Fire Pistol Team	Ukraine; Pavlo Korostylov; Oleksandr Petriv; Volodymyr Pasternak	Germany; Christian Reitz; Mathian Putzmann; Oliver Geis	France; Boris Artaud; Clement Bessaguet; Alban Lucien Pierson
50m Pistol	Samuil Donkov (BUL)	Mikhail Isakov (RUS)	Viktor Bankin (UKR)
50m Pistol Team	Ukraine; Pavlo Korostylov; Oleh Omelchuk; Viktor Bankin	Italy; Giuseppe Giordano; Alessio Torracchi; Dario Di Martino	Russia; Mikhail Isakov; Nikolai Kilin; Anton Aristarkhov

=== Rifle ===
Event	Gold	Silver	Bronze
50m Rifle Prone	Marcin Majka (POL)	Maxililian Dallinger (GER)	Tomasz Bartnik (POL)
50m Rifle Prone Team	Poland; Marcin Majka; Tomasz Bartnik; Daniel Romanczyk	Italy; Marco De Nicolo; Lorenzo Bacci; Marco Suppini	Switzerland; Jan Lochbihler; Christoph Dürr; Lars Faerber
50m Rifle 3 Positions	Petr Nymbursky (CZE)	Filip Nepejchal (CZE)	Jon-Hermann Hegg (NOR)
50m Rifle 3 Positions Team	Norway; Simon Claussen; Henrik Larsen; Jon-Hermann Hegg	Czech Republic; Petr Nymbursky; Filip Nepejchal; David Hrckulak	Hungary; Istvan Peni; Péter Sidi; Zalan Pekler

=== 300 m rifle ===
Event	Gold	Silver	Bronze
300m Standard Rifle	Bernhard Pickl (AUT)	Karl Olsson (SWE)	Simon Claussen (NOR)
300m Standard Rifle Team	Norway; Hans Kristian Wear; Kin Andre Lund; Simon Claussen	Switzerland; Gilles Vincent Dufaux; Rafael Bereuter; Jan Lochbihler	France; Michael D'Halluin; Emilien Chassat; Alexis Raynaud
300m Rifle Prone	Simon Claussen (NOR)	Remi Moreno Flores (FRA)	Jan Lochbihler (SUI)
300m Rifle Prone Team	Sweden; Per Sandberg; Johan Gustafsson; Karl Olsson	Hungary; Norbert Szabian; Péter Sidi; Istvan Peni	Switzerland; Gilles Vincent Dufaux; Sandro Greuter; Jan Lochbihler
300m Rifle 3 Positions	Simon Claussen (NOR)	Bernhard Pickl (AUT)	Péter Sidi (HUN)
300m Rifle 3 Positions Team	Norway; Simon Claussen; Hans Kristian Wear; Kim Andre Lund	France; Michael D'Halluin; Alexis Raynaud; Emilien Chassat	Switzerland; Gilles Vincent Dufaux; Sandro Greuter; Jan Lochbihler

== Women's events ==
=== Pistol ===
Event	Gold	Silver	Bronze
25m Pistol	Monika Karsch (GER)	Veronika Major (HUN)	Mathilde Lamolle (FRA)
25m Pistol Team	Germany; Doreen Vennekamp; Monika Karsch; Michelle Skeries	France; Céline Goberville; Mathilde Lamolle; Sandrine Goberville	Hungary; Veronika Major; Zsófia Csonka; Viktória Egri

=== Rifle ===
Event	Gold	Silver	Bronze
50m Rifle Prone	Yulia Zykova (RUS)	Eva Rösken (GER)	Gitta Bajos (HUN)
50m Rifle Prone Team	Russia; Yulia Zykova; Maria Ivanova; Polina Khorosheva	Norway; Katrine Lund; Jenny Stene; Jeanette Hegg Duestad	Germany; Eva Rösken; Jolyn Beer; Denise Palberg
50m Rifle 3 Positions	Nina Christen (SUI)	Maria Martynova (BLR)	Jenny Stene (NOR)
50m Rifle 3 Positions Team	Norway; Jenny Stene; Jeanette Hegg Duestad; Katrine Lund	Russia; Polina Khorosheva; Maria Ivanova; Yulia Zykova	Germany; Jolyn Beer; Eva Rösken; Denise Palberg

=== 300 m rifle ===
Event	Gold	Silver	Bronze
300m Rifle Prone	Seonaid McIntosh (GBR)	Eva Rösken (GER)	Linda Olofsson (SWE)
300m Rifle Prone Team	Switzerland; Silvia Guignard; Andrea Brühlmann; Marina Schnider	Germany; Jolyn Beer; Eva Rösken; Lisa Müller	Sweden; Anna Normann; Elin Ahlin; Linda Olofsson
300m Rifle 3 Positions	Jolyn Beer (GER)	Andrea Brühlmann (SUI)	Silvia Guignard (SUI)
300m Rifle 3 Positions Team	Germany; Jolyn Beer; Lisa Müller; Eva Rösken	Switzerland; Andrea Brühlmann; Silvia Guignard; Marina Schnider	Sweden; Elin Ahlin; Anna Normann; Linda Olofsson

== Mixed events ==
=== Pistol ===
Event	Gold	Silver	Bronze
25m Standard Pistol Mixed Team	Germany; Monika Karsch; Christian Reitz	Ukraine; Olena Kostevych; Pavlo Korostylov	Sweden; Josefine Thörnqvist; Per-Anders Lander
50m Pistol Mixed Team	Russia; Margarita Lomova; Mikhail Isakov	Ukraine; Oksana Kovalchuk; Pavlo Korostylov	Ukraine; Olena Kostevych; Oleh Omelchuk

=== Rifle ===
Event	Gold	Silver	Bronze
50m Rifle Prone Mixed Team	Norway; Jeanette Hegg Duestad; Simon Claussen	Russia; Polina Khorosheva; Kirill Grigoryan	Great Britain; Seonaid McIntosh; Kenneth Parr

=== 300 m Rifle ===
Event	Gold	Silver	Bronze
300m Rifle Standing Mixed Team	Switzerland; Jan Lochbihler; Silvia Guignard	Sweden; Elin Ahlin; Karl Olsson	Norway; Simon Claussen; Jenny Vatne

== Men's Junior events ==
=== Pistol ===
Event	Gold	Silver	Bronze
25m Pistol	Ernests Erbs (LAT)	Florian Peter (GER)	Yuriy Kolesnyk (UKR)
25m Pistol Team	Italy; Massimo Spinella; Andrea Morassut; Federico Nilo Maldini	Germany; Florian Peter; Stefan Max Holl; Christoph Lutz	Latvia; Ernests Erbs; Rihards Zorge; Daniels Vilciņš
25m Rapid Fire Pistol	Egor Ismakov (RUS)	Antonin Tupý (CZE)	Dmitrii Maliukov (RUS)
25m Rapid Fire Pistol Team	Germany; Florian Peter; Stefan Max Holl; Christoph Lutz	Russia; Egor Ismakov; Dmitrii Maliukov; Daniil Shikhov	Ukraine; Yuriy Kolesnyk; Roman Pleskun; Nazarii-Orest Kozii
25m Standard Pistol	Laurent Pierre Andre Cussigh (FRA)	Matěj Rampula (CZE)	Florian Peter (GER)
25m Standard Pistol Team	Czech Republic; Matěj Rampula; Antonin Tupý; Jan Vildomec	Italy; Massimo Spinella; Federico Nilo Maldini; Andrea Morassut	Russia; Egor Ismakov; Daniil Shikhov; Dmitrii Maliukov
50m Pistol	Andrei Chilikov (RUS)	Massimo Spinella (ITA)	Kiril Kirov (BUL)

=== Rifle ===
Event	Gold	Silver	Bronze
50m Rifle Prone	Grigorii Shamakov (RUS)	Lucas Bernard Denis Kryzs (FRA)	Soma Richard Hammerl (HUN)
50m Rifle Prone Team	Russia; Grigorii Shamakov; Alexander Vasilyev; Savelii Triapitsyn	France; Lucas Bernard Denis Kryzs; Nicolas Mompach; Dimitri Dutendas	Austria; Stefan Wadlegger; Andreas Thum; Tobias Mair
50m Rifle 3 Positions	Max Braun (GER)	Grigorii Shamakov (RUS)	Maciej Kowalewicz (POL)
50m Rifle 3 Positions Team	Russia; Grigorii Shamakov; Savelii Triapitsyn; Alexander Vasilyev	Hungary; Soma Richard Hammerl; Marton Istvan Klenczner; Viktor Kiss	Norway; Vegard Nordhagen; Aleksander Teisrud; Lars Tobias Ulnes Bernhoft-Osa

== Women's Junior events ==
=== Pistol ===
Event	Gold	Silver	Bronze
25m Pistol	Camille Jedrzejewski (FRA)	Annabelle Christiane Pioch (FRA)	Margherita Brigida Veccaro (ITA)
25m Pistol Team	France; Camille Jedrzejewski; Annabelle Christiane Pioch; Kateline Nicolas	Italy; Margherita Brigida Veccaro; Brunella Aria; Chiara Giancamilli	Russia; Nadezhda Koloda; Olga Shchemelinina; Albina Bevz

=== Rifle ===
Event	Gold	Silver	Bronze
50m Rifle Prone	Valentina Caluori (SUI)	Sofia Ceccarello (ITA)	Melissa Ruschel (GER)
50m Rifle Prone Team	Switzerland; Valentina Caluori; Sarina Hitz; Franziska Stark	Italy; Sofia Ceccarello; Nicole Gabrielli; Sofia Benetti	Austria; Rebecca Köck; Sheileen Waibel; Lisa Hafner
50m Rifle 3 Positions	Anna Janssen (GER)	Sofia Ceccarello (ITA)	Melissa Ruschel (GER)
50m Rifle 3 Positions Team	Germany; Johanna Theresa Tripp; Anna Janssen; Melissa Ruschel	Czech Republic; Sara Karasová; Katerina Štefanková; Karolína Brabcová	Hungary; Eszter Dénes; Lalita Gaspar; Dorina Eszter Lovász

== Mixed Junior events ==
=== Pistol ===
Event	Gold	Silver	Bronze
25m Standard Pistol Mixed Team	Germany; Vanessa Seeger; Florian Peter	Italy; Margherita Brigida Veccaro; Federico Nilo Maldini	Ukraine; Mariia-Solomiia Vozniak; Yuriy Kolesnyk
50m Pistol Mixed Team	Russia; Nadezhda Koloda; Andrei Chilikov	Russia; Albina Bevz; Egor Vyskrebtsev	Ukraine; Nadiia Shmanova; Ihor Solovei

=== Rifle ===
Event	Gold	Silver	Bronze
50m Rifle Prone Mixed Team	Hungary; Eszter Dénes; Soma Richard Hammerl	Czech Republic; Sara Karasová; Jiří Přívratský	Switzerland; Valentina Caluori; Lukas Oliver Roth

== See also ==
- 2019 European Shotgun Championships
- 2019 European Running Target Championships
- European Shooting Confederation
