= Shooting at the 2023 European Games – Mixed team 50 metre rifle three positions =

Mixed team 50 metre rifle three positions at the 2023 European Games
- Venue: Wrocław Shooting Centre
- Dates: 28 June
- Competitors: 52 from 15 nations
- Teams: 26

Medalists
gold medal	Nina Christen; Jan Lochbihler	Switzerland
silver medal	Sheileen Waibel; Andreas Thum	Austria
bronze medal	Jenny Stene; Simon Kolstad Claussen	Norway

The mixed team 50 metre rifle three positions event at the 2023 European Games took place on 28 June at the Wrocław Shooting Centre.

== Records ==
Prior to this competition, the existing world, European and Games records were as follows.

Qualification
World Record	Austria; Sheileen Waibel; Gernot Rumpler	889	Osijek, Croatia	31 May 2021
European Record	Austria; Sheileen Waibel; Gernot Rumpler	889	Osijek, Croatia	31 May 2021
Games Record	—	—	—	—

== Results ==
=== Qualification 1 ===
Rank	Country	Athlete	Kneeling	Prone	Standing	Total	Team total	Notes
1	Austria 2	Sheileen Waibel	149	149	146	444-25x	888-49x	Q, GR
1	Austria 2	Andreas Thum	148	148	148	444-24x	888-49x	Q, GR
2	Austria 1	Nadine Ungerank	145	149	143	437-19x	882-49x	Q
2	Austria 1	Alexander Schmirl	146	150	149	445-30x	882-49x	Q
3	Switzerland 2	Nina Christen	149	149	146	444-27x	881-52x	Q
3	Switzerland 2	Jan Lochbihler	149	148	140	437-25x	881-52x	Q
4	Norway 2	Jenny Stene	147	149	147	443-26x	881-47x	Q
4	Norway 2	Simon Kolstad Claussen	145	148	145	438-21x	881-47x	Q
5	Hungary 2	Eszter Mészáros	147	149	144	440-23x	881-41x	Q
5	Hungary 2	Zalán Pekler	146	149	146	441-18x	881-41x	Q
6	Serbia 2	Teodora Vukojević	149	145	143	437-15x	880-41x	Q
6	Serbia 2	Milutin Stefanović	147	149	147	443-26x	880-41x	Q
7	Poland 2	Natalia Kochańska	144	144	147	435-19x	878-43x	Q
7	Poland 2	Maciej Kowalewicz	148	148	147	443-24x	878-43x	Q
8	Denmark	Stephanie Grundsøe	143	147	146	436-18x	877-41x	Q
8	Denmark	Steffen Halfdan Olsen	146	149	146	441-23x	877-41x	Q
9	Czech Republic 2	Aneta Brabcová	145	149	141	435-18x	876-44x	
9	Czech Republic 2	Jiří Přívratský	147	149	145	441-26x	876-44x	
10	Norway 1	Jeanette Hegg Duestad	144	148	144	436-18x	876-40x	
10	Norway 1	Jon-Hermann Hegg	143	150	147	440-22x	876-40x	
11	Italy 1	Barbara Gambaro	142	146	147	435-23x	873-42x	
11	Italy 1	Simon Weithaler	147	149	142	438-19x	873-42x	
12	Ukraine 2	Nataliia Kalnysh	149	147	138	434-20x	871-41x	
12	Ukraine 2	Oleh Tsarkov	146	149	142	437-21x	871-41x	
13	Slovakia 1	Daniela Pešková	143	146	141	430-15x	871-40x	
13	Slovakia 1	Patrik Jány	147	149	145	441-25x	871-40x	
14	Slovenia	Urška Kuharič	146	149	140	435-20x	871-39x	
14	Slovenia	Robert Markoja	147	148	141	436-19x	871-39x	
15	Croatia	Marta Zeljković	146	148	139	433-12x	871-34x	
15	Croatia	Petar Gorša	146	145	147	438-22x	871-34x	
16	Great Britain	Katie Gleeson	145	143	141	429-13x	869-38x	
16	Great Britain	Michael Bargeron	150	149	141	440-25x	869-38x	
17	Serbia 1	Andrea Arsović	144	148	145	437-18x	869-37x	
17	Serbia 1	Milenko Sebić	143	147	142	432-19x	869-37x	
18	Germany 2	Lisa Müller	145	149	143	437-16x	869-27x	
18	Germany 2	David Koenders	145	146	141	432-11x	869-27x	
19	Germany 1	Jolyn Beer	143	148	142	433-16x	868-31x	
19	Germany 1	Maximilian Dallinger	146	146	143	435-15x	868-31x	
20	Ukraine 1	Daria Tykhova	143	147	144	434-19x	867-40x	
20	Ukraine 1	Serhii Kulish	142	146	145	433-21x	867-40x	
21	Switzerland 1	Chiara Leone	145	147	143	435-19x	865-37x	
21	Switzerland 1	Christoph Dürr	144	149	137	430-18x	865-37x	
22	Italy 2	Sofia Ceccarello	144	147	141	432-18x	865-36x	
22	Italy 2	Riccardo Armiraglio	143	147	143	433-18x	865-36x	
23	Slovakia 2	Kamila Novotná	148	147	145	440-25x	864-39x	
23	Slovakia 2	Štefan Šulek	143	144	137	424-14x	864-39x	
24	Poland 1	Aneta Stankiewicz	148	145	142	435-13x	864-25x	
24	Poland 1	Tomasz Bartnik	144	144	141	429-12x	864-25x	
25	Hungary 1	Eszter Dénes	140	145	143	428-16x	862-38x	
25	Hungary 1	István Péni	146	148	140	434-22x	862-38x	
26	Czech Republic 1	Veronika Blažíčková	143	144	133	420-9x	855-33x	
26	Czech Republic 1	Petr Nymburský	145	148	142	435-24x	855-33x	

=== Qualification 2 ===
Rank	Country	Athlete	Kneeling	Prone	Standing	Total	Team total	Notes
1	Austria 2	Sheileen Waibel	96	100	96	292-14x	585-28x	QG
1	Austria 2	Andreas Thum	96	99	98	293-14x	585-28x	QG
2	Switzerland 2	Nina Christen	98	99	96	293-19x	583-33x	QG
2	Switzerland 2	Jan Lochbihler	96	100	94	290-14x	583-33x	QG
3	Norway 2	Jenny Stene	99	97	98	294-17x	583-26x	QB
3	Norway 2	Simon Kolstad Claussen	96	98	95	289-9x	583-26x	QB
4	Denmark	Stephanie Grundsøe	99	98	91	288-11x	579-27x	QB
4	Denmark	Steffen Halfdan Olsen	99	99	93	291-16x	579-27x	QB
5	Hungary 2	Eszter Mészáros	98	97	96	291-12x	579-22x	
5	Hungary 2	Zalán Pekler	93	100	95	288-10x	579-22x	
6	Austria 1	Nadine Ungerank	96	99	94	289-8x	579-21x	
6	Austria 1	Alexander Schmirl	96	100	94	290-13x	579-21x	
7	Poland 2	Natalia Kochańska	92	99	96	287-6x	579-19x	
7	Poland 2	Maciej Kowalewicz	96	98	98	292-13x	579-19x	
8	Serbia 2	Teodora Vukojević	95	99	92	286-12x	571-24x	
8	Serbia 2	Milutin Stefanović	96	97	92	285-12x	571-24x	

=== Finals ===
Rank	Country	Athletes	Total
Gold medal match
1st place, gold medalist(s)	Switzerland 2	Nina Christen; Jan Lochbihler	16
2nd place, silver medalist(s)	Austria 2	Sheileen Waibel; Andreas Thum	10
Bronze medal match
3rd place, bronze medalist(s)	Norway 2	Jenny Stene; Simon Kolstad Claussen	16
4	Denmark	Stephanie Grundsøe; Steffen Halfdan Olsen	14
