= 2023 European 10 m Events Championships =

- Venue: Ring Sport (finals); Unibet Arena (qualifications)
- Location: Tallinn, Estonia
- Dates: 5–13 March
- Competitors: 521 from 40 nations

The 2023 European 10 m Events Championships was held from 5 to 13 March 2023 in Tallinn, Estonia. There are 8 places awarded at the 2024 Summer Olympics and 48 places at the 2023 European Games.

== Schedule ==
Finals schedule

Date	Event
7 March	Air Pistol Mix Junior
7 March	Air Rifle Women Junior
7 March	Air Rifle Men Junior
8 March	Air Rifle Mix Junior
8 March	Air Pistol Women Junior
8 March	Air Pistol Men Junior
9 March	Team Air Pistol Men Junior
9 March	Team Air Pistol Women Junior
9 March	Team Air Rifle Men Junior
9 March	Team Air Rifle Women Junior

Date	Event
10 March	Air Rifle Mix
10 March	Air Pistol Women
10 March	Air Pistol Men
11 March	Air Pistol Mix
11 March	Air Rifle Women
11 March	Air Rifle Men
12 March	Team Air Pistol Men
12 March	Team Air Pistol Women
12 March	Team Air Rifle Men
12 March	Team Air Rifle Women

== Medalists ==
=== Medal table ===
* Host nation (Estonia)

Rank	Nation	Gold	Silver	Bronze	Total
1	Norway	3	3	2	8
2	Italy	3	2	3	8
2	Serbia	3	2	3	8
4	Poland	3	0	2	5
5	Czech Republic	1	2	1	4
6	Germany	1	1	4	6
7	Hungary	1	1	3	5
8	Sweden	1	0	3	4
9	Turkey	1	0	1	2
10	Croatia	1	0	0	1
10	Denmark	1	0	0	1
10	Greece	1	0	0	1
13	Austria	0	1	1	2
13	France	0	1	1	2
13	Ukraine	0	1	1	2
16	Azerbaijan	0	1	0	1
16	Great Britain	0	1	0	1
16	Israel	0	1	0	1
16	Romania	0	1	0	1
16	Slovakia	0	1	0	1
16	Switzerland	0	1	0	1
22	Georgia	0	0	4	4
23	Armenia	0	0	1	1
23	Bulgaria	0	0	1	1
Totals (24 entries)		20	20	31	71

=== Seniors ===
Event	Gold	Silver	Bronze
Men
Air Pistol Men	Damir Mikec; Serbia	Ruslan Lunev; Azerbaijan	Paolo Monna; Italy
Air Rifle Men	Maximilian Ulbrich; Germany	Patrik Jány; Slovakia	Alexander Schmirl; Austria
Team Air Pistol Men	Turkey; İsmail Keleş; Yusuf Dikeç; Buğra Selimzade	Germany; Robin Walter; Paul Frölich; Michael Schwald	Ukraine; Viktor Bankin; Oleh Omelchuk; Pavlo Korostylov Serbia; Duško Petrov; Damir Mikec; Dimitrije Grgić
Team Air Rifle Men	Serbia; Milutin Stefanović; Milenko Sebić; Lazar Kovačević	Austria; Alexander Schmirl; Tobias Mair; Martin Strempfl	Germany; David Könders; Maximilian Dallinger; Maximilian Ulbrich Sweden; Ludwig Wassman; Erik Sahlin; Marcus Madsen
Women
Air Pistol Women	Anna Korakaki; Greece	Camille Jedrzejewski; France	Elmira Karapetyan; Armenia
Air Rifle Women	Jeanette Hegg Duestad; Norway	Seonaid McIntosh; Great Britain	Anna Janssen; Germany
Team Air Pistol Women	Poland; Klaudia Breś; Julita Borek; Agnieszka Korejwo	Serbia; Zorana Arunović; Brankica Zarić; Jovana Todorović	Hungary; Veronika Major; Miriam Jákó; Zsófia Csonka
Team Air Rifle Women	Norway; Katrine Lund; Jenny Stene; Jeanette Hegg Duestad	Serbia; Teodora Vukojević; Ivana Maksimović; Andrea Arsović	Poland; Julia Piotrowska; Natalia Kochańska; Aneta Stankiewicz Germany; Larissa Weindorf; Vanessa Gleißner; Anna Janssen
Mixed
Air Pistol Mix	Serbia; Zorana Arunović; Damir Mikec	Italy; Chiara Giancamilli; Federico Nilo Maldini	Turkey; Şevval İlayda Tarhan; Yusuf Dikeç France; Camille Jedrzejewski; Florian Fouquet
Air Rifle Mix	Norway; Jeanette Hegg Duestad; Jon-Hermann Hegg	Israel; Olga Tashtchiev; Sergey Richter	Italy; Sofia Ceccarello; Danilo Sollazzo Norway; Jenny Stene; Henrik Larsen

=== Juniors ===
Event	Gold	Silver	Bronze
Men
Air Pistol Men	Matteo Mastrovalerio; Italy	Luca Joldea; Romania	Gabriele Aldo Villani; Italy
Air Rifle Men	Victor Lindgren; Sweden	Ferenc Török; Hungary	Jesper Johansson; Sweden
Team Air Pistol Men	Italy; Matteo Mastrovalerio; Liang Xi Savorani; Gabriele Aldo Villani	Norway; Tobias Skaarstad; Sondre Risan Haltvik; Hans Wang Nöstvold	Bulgaria; Dimitar Todorov; Petar Vladimirov Ivanov; Kirill Ushanli Poland; Maciej Zygmuntowski; Wiktor Blada; Wiktor Kopiwoda
Team Air Rifle Men	Poland; Michał Chojnowski; Jakub Kowalski; Wiktor Sajdak	Norway; Vebjörn Grimsrud; Jens Olsrud Östli; Even Olai Enger Throndsen	Serbia; Petar Erdei; Marko Ivanović; Aleksa Rakonjac Sweden; Jesper Johansson; Pontus Kallin; Victor Lindgren
Women
Air Pistol Women	Anna Ćukušić; Croatia	Anna Miřejovská; Czech Republic	Salome Prodiashvili; Georgia
Air Rifle Women	Anne Bakke Nielsen; Denmark	Audrey Gogniat; Switzerland	Veronika Blažíčková; Czech Republic
Team Air Pistol Women	Czech Republic; Anna Miřejovská; Nicol Simetová; Klara Tichaková	Italy; Francesca Cardiero; Alessandra Fait; Federica Quattrocchi	Georgia; Mariam Abramishvili; Salome Prodiashvili; Mariami Prodiashvili Germany; Johanna Blenck; Lydia Vetter; Maxi Vogt
Team Air Rifle Women	Poland; Maja Gawenda; Julia Mikołowska; Wilhelmina Wośkowiak	Norway; Synnöve Berg; Thiril Brendryen; Pernille Nor-Woll	Serbia; Ljiljana Cvetković; Alexsandra Havran; Emilija Ponjavić Hungary; Csilla Ferik; Anne Toth; Regina Vintze
Mixed
Air Pistol Mix	Italy; Alessandra Fait; Matteo Mastrovalerio	Ukraine; Viliena Bevz; Maksym Himon	Georgia; Mariami Prodiashvili; Ioane Khvareshia Georgia; Mariam Abramishvili; Giorgi Mumladze
Air Rifle Mix	Hungary; Anne Toth; Ferenc Török	Czech Republic; Veronika Blažíčková; Ondřej Kupec	Hungary; Csilla Ferik; Bálint Kálmán Norway; Pernille Nor-Woll; Jens Olsrud Östli

== Olympic quotas ==
Nation	Men's		Women's		Total
Nation	Pistol	Rifle	Pistol	Rifle	Total
Azerbaijan	1				1
France			1		1
Germany		1			1
Great Britain				1	1
Greece			1		1
Norway				1	1
Serbia	1				1
Slovakia		1			1
Total: 8 countries	2	2	2	2	8

== Participating nations ==
- Albania (4)
- Armenia (7)
- Austria (25)
- Azerbaijan (20)
- Belgium (4)
- Bosnia and Herzegovina (5)
- Bulgaria (11)
- Croatia (17)
- Czech Republic (26)
- Denmark (7)
- Estonia (40)
- Finland (10)
- France (7)
- Georgia (10)
- Germany (25)
- Great Britain (6)
- Greece (3)
- Hungary (31)
- Israel (4)
- Italy (26)
- Kosovo (2)
- Latvia (14)
- Lithuania (12)
- Malta (1)
- Moldova (2)
- Montenegro (6)
- Netherlands (4)
- North Macedonia (3)
- Norway (23)
- Poland (22)
- Portugal (9)
- Romania (7)
- Serbia (22)
- Slovakia (7)
- Slovenia (11)
- Spain (15)
- Sweden (18)
- Switzerland (13)
- Turkey (18)
- Ukraine (24)
