= Løvseth =

Løvseth is a Norwegian surname. Notable people with the surname include:

- Kristin Tøsse Løvseth (born 1973), Norwegian curler
- Mari Bårdseng Løvseth (born 2000), Norwegian sport shooter
- Solveig Løvseth (born 1999), Norwegian triathlete

== See also ==
- Sondre Rossbach (full name Sondre Løvseth Rossbach; born 1996), Norwegian football player
