= 2022 European 25/50 m Events Championships =

- Dates: 5 - 18 September
- Host city: Wrocław, Poland
- Level: Senior
- Participation: 451 athletes from 35 nations

The 2022 European 25/50 m Events Championships was organised by the European Shooting Confederation and held in Polish city of Wrocław.

The championships also served as qualification event for 2024 Summer Olympics and 2023 European Games.

== Senior ==
=== Rifle events ===
Event	Gold	Silver	Bronze
Men's 50m Rifle 3 Positions	Petr Nymburský; Czech Republic	Jon-Hermann Hegg; Norway	Jiří Přívratský; Czech Republic
Men's Team 50m Rifle 3 Positions	Czech Republic; Jiří Přívratský; Frantisek Smetana; Petr Nymburský	Norway; Henrik Larsen; Simon Claussen; Jon-Hermann Hegg	Switzerland; Jan Lochbihler; Christoph Dürr; Lukas Oliver Roth
Men's 50m Rifle Prone	Jan Lochbihler; Switzerland	Anton Rizov; Bulgaria	Simon Claussen; Norway
Women's 50m Rifle 3 Positions	Rikke Maeng Ibsen; Denmark	Veronika Blažíčková; Czech Republic	Daria Tykhova; Ukraine
Women's Team 50m Rifle 3 Positions	Germany; Jolyn Beer; Anna Janssen; Lisa Müller	Czech Republic; Lucie Brázdová; Veronika Blažíčková; Aneta Brabcová	Norway; Jenny Stene; Mari Bardseng Lovseth; Jeanette Hegg Duestad
Women's 50m Rifle Prone	Anna Janssen; Germany	Jenny Stene; Norway	Jeanette Hegg Duestad; Norway
Mixed Team 50m Rifle 3 Positions	Norway; Jeanette Hegg Duestad; Jon-Hermann Hegg	Norway; Jenny Stene; Simon Claussen	Denmark; Stephanie Grundsøe; Steffen Olsen
Mixed Team 50m Rifle Prone	Austria; Sheileen Waibel; Thomas Mathis	Norway; Jenny Stene; Henrik Larsen	Switzerland; Chiara Leone; Jan Lochbihler

=== Pistol events ===
Event	Gold	Silver	Bronze
Men's 25m Rapid Fire Pistol	Clément Bessaguet; France	Oliver Geis; Germany	Pavlo Korostylov; Ukraine
Men's Team 25m Rapid Fire Pistol	France; Jean Quiquampoix; Clément Bessaguet; Laurent Cussigh	Poland; Oskar Miliwek; Patryk Sakowski; Damian Klimek	Czech Republic; Matěj Rampula; Martin Podhráský; Tomas Tehan
Women's 25m Pistol	Doreen Vennekamp; Germany	Klaudia Breś; Poland	Renáta Tobai-Sike; Hungary
Women's Team 25m Pistol	Germany; Doreen Vennekamp; Michelle Skeries; Monika Karsch	Ukraine; Olena Kostevych; Anastasiia Nimets; Oksana Kovalchuk	Poland; Joanna Iwona Wawrzonowska; Julita Borek; Klaudia Breś
Open 25m Center Fire Pistol	Adrian Schaub; Switzerland	Ruslan Lunev; Azerbaijan	Peeter Olesk; Estonia
Open 25m Standard Pistol	Ruslan Lunev; Azerbaijan	Pavlo Korostylov; Ukraine	Matěj Rampula; Czech Republic
Open 50m Pistol	João Costa; Portugal	Lauris Strautmanis; Latvia	Damir Mikec; Serbia
Mixed Teams 25m Rapid Fire Pistol	Ukraine; Anastasiia Nimets; Volodymyr Pasternak	Czech Republic; Alžběta Dědová; Matěj Rampula	Ukraine; Yuliya Korostylova; Pavlo Korostylov

== Junior ==
=== Rifle events ===
Event	Gold	Silver	Bronze
Men's 50m Rifle 3 Positions	Nathan Bailly; France	Edoardo Bonazzi; Italy	Romain Aufrere; France
Men's Team 50m Rifle 3 Positions	France; Florent Pomar; Romain Aufrere; Nathan Bailly	Poland; Wiktor Sajdak; Michal Chojnowski; Maciej Ogórek	Hungary; Ferenc Török; András Dénes; Péter Antal Wittmann
Men's 50m Rifle Prone	Leon Thieser; Germany	Kiano Waibel; Austria	András Dénes; Hungary
Women's 50m Rifle 3 Positions	Julie Johannessen; Norway	Larissa Weindorf; Germany	Finja Rentmeister; Germany
Women's Team 50m Rifle 3 Positions	Germany; Hannah Wehren; Nele Stark; Larissa Weindorf	Switzerland; Marta Szabo Bouza; Gina Daniela Gyger; Jennifer Kocher	Norway; Caroline Finnestad Lund; Hanna Synnøve Huser; Julie Johannessen
Women's 50m Rifle Prone	Caroline Finnestad Lund; Norway	Gina Daniela Gyger; Switzerland	Maja Magdalena Gawenda; Poland
Mixed Team 50m Rifle 3 Positions	Finland; Alexandra Rosenlew; Lauri-Eemil Syrja	Czech Republic; Adéla Zrůstová; Vojtěch Záborec	Italy; Anna Schiavon; Danilo Sollazzo
Mixed Team 50m Rifle Prone	Germany; Nele Stark; Nils Friedmann	Norway; Julie Johannessen; Even Olai Enger Throndsen	Norway; Caroline Finnestad Lund; Lars Gulbrandsen Lilleng

=== Pistol events ===
Event	Gold	Silver	Bronze
Men's 25m Pistol	Matteo Mastrovalerio; Italy	Daniels Vilciņš; Latvia	Hans Wang Nøstvold; Norway
Men's 25m Rapid Fire Pistol	Yan Chesnel; France	Michele Palella; Italy	Tobias Gsöll; Germany
Men's Team 25m Rapid Fire Pistol	France; Romain Zunino; Yan Chesnel; Theo Moczko	Italy; Luca Arrighi; Matteo Mastrovalerio; Michele Palella	Hungary; Dávid Ákos Laczik; Ákos Károly Nagy; Máté Rédecsi
Women's 25m Pistol	Miriam Jákó; Hungary	Heloise Fourre; France	Viliena Bevz; Ukraine
Women's Team 25m Pistol	Czech Republic; Anna Miřejovská; Kateřina Středová; Klára Ticháčková	Ukraine; Nadiia Shamanova; Yuliia Didenko; Viliena Bevz	Hungary; Sára Ráhel Fábián; Miriam Jákó; Olivia Ditta Domsits
Open's 25m Standard Pistol	Matteo Mastrovalerio; Italy	Adnan Efe Uçar; Turkey	Michele Palella; Italy

== Medal table ==
=== Seniors ===
* Host nation (Poland)

Rank	Nation	Gold	Silver	Bronze	Total
1	Germany	4	1	0	5
2	Czech Republic	2	3	3	8
3	Switzerland	2	0	2	4
4	France	2	0	0	2
5	Norway	1	5	3	9
6	Ukraine	1	2	3	6
7	Azerbaijan	1	1	0	2
8	Denmark	1	0	1	2
9	Austria	1	0	0	1
9	Portugal	1	0	0	1
11	Poland*	0	2	1	3
12	Bulgaria	0	1	0	1
12	Latvia	0	1	0	1
14	Estonia	0	0	1	1
14	Hungary	0	0	1	1
14	Serbia	0	0	1	1
Totals (16 entries)		16	16	16	48

=== Juniors ===
* Host nation (Poland)

Rank	Nation	Gold	Silver	Bronze	Total
1	France	4	1	1	6
2	Germany	3	1	2	6
3	Italy	2	3	2	7
4	Norway	2	1	3	6
5	Czech Republic	1	1	0	2
6	Hungary	1	0	4	5
7	Finland	1	0	0	1
8	Switzerland	0	2	0	2
9	Poland*	0	1	1	2
9	Ukraine	0	1	1	2
11	Austria	0	1	0	1
11	Latvia	0	1	0	1
11	Turkey	0	1	0	1
Totals (13 entries)		14	14	14	42

== Olympic quotas ==
Nation	Men's		Women's		Total
Nation	FR 3x40	RFP	R 3x40	SP	Total
Czech Republic	1		1		2
Denmark			1		1
France		1			1
Germany		1		1	2
Norway	1				1
Poland				1	1
Total: 6 countries	2	2	2	2	8
