= Linda Olofsson =

Linda Olofsson may refer to:

- Linda Olofsson (TV journalist) (born 1973), Swedish TV journalist
- Linda Olofsson (swimmer) (born 1972), Swedish Olympic freestyle swimmer
- Linda Olofsson (sport shooter) (born 1982), Swedish sport shooter
