= Jenny Stene =

Norwegian sport shooter (born 1998)

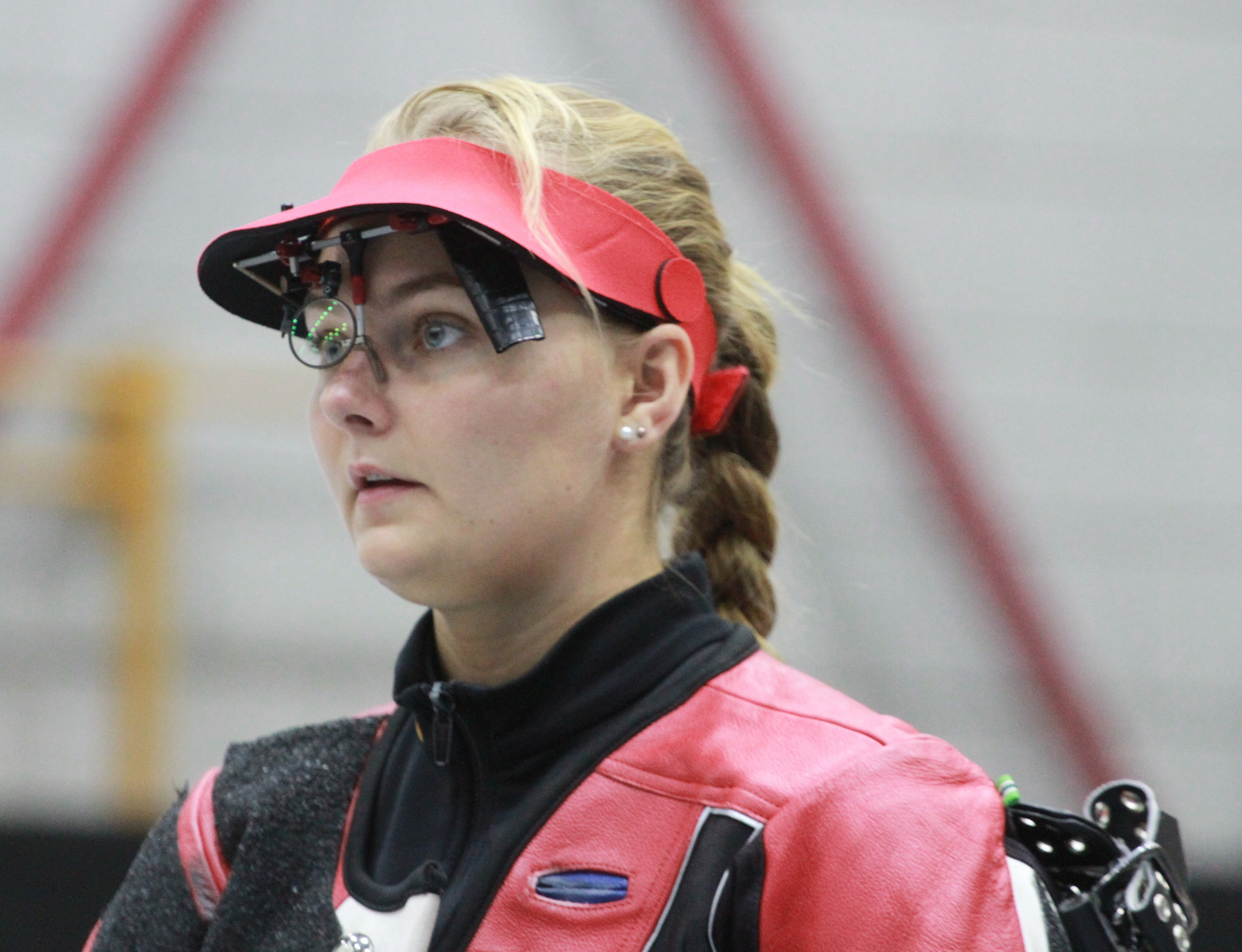

Personal information
- Full name: Jenny Østre Stene
- Nationality: Norwegian
- Born: 8 March 1998 (age 28) Lørenskog, Norway
- Height: 173 cm (5 ft 8 in)

Sport
- Sport: Shooting
- Club: Kisen
Medal record
World Championships
Gold medal – first place	2022 Cairo	50 m rifle 3 positions mixed team
Silver medal – second place	2022 Cairo	50 m rifle 3 positions
Silver medal – second place	2023 Baku	50 m rifle prone team
Bronze medal – third place	2023 Baku	50 m rifle 3 positions team
European Games
Gold medal – first place	2023 Kraków–Małopolska	50 m rifle 3 positions
Gold medal – first place	2023 Kraków–Małopolska	50 m rifle 3 positions team
Silver medal – second place	2023 Kraków–Małopolska	10 m air rifle team
Bronze medal – third place	2023 Kraków–Małopolska	50 m rifle 3 positions mixed team
European Championships
Gold medal – first place	2019 Bologna	50 m rifle 3 positions team
Gold medal – first place	2023 Tallinn	10 m air rifle team
Silver medal – second place	2019 Bologna	50 m rifle prone team
Silver medal – second place	2020 Wrocław	10 m rifle team
Silver medal – second place	2021 Osijek	50 m rifle 3 positions team
Silver medal – second place	2022 Wrocław	50 m rifle prone
Silver medal – second place	2022 Wrocław	50 m rifle 3 positions mixed team
Silver medal – second place	2022 Wrocław	50 m rifle prone mixed team
Bronze medal – third place	2019 Bologna	50 m rifle 3 positions
Bronze medal – third place	2021 Osijek	50 m rifle 3 positions mixed team
Bronze medal – third place	2022 Wrocław	50 m rifle 3 positions team
Bronze medal – third place	2023 Tallinn	10 m air rifle mixed team

Jenny Østre Stene (born 8 March 1998) is a Norwegian sport shooter. Her achievements include winning an individual silver medal and team gold medal in rifle shooting at the ISSF World Shooting Championships, as well as winning both individual gold medal and team gold medal at the 2023 European Games.

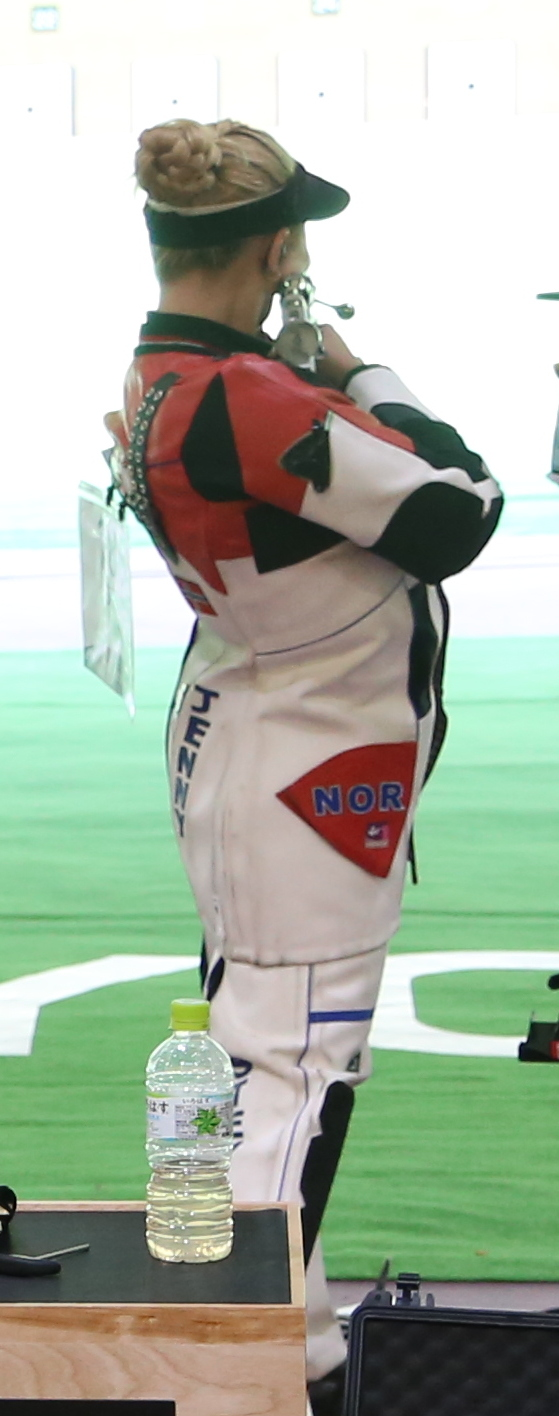
Stene at the 2020 Summer Olympics

== Biography ==
Stene was born in Lørenskog on 8 March 1998.

=== 2021 ===
At the 2021 European Shooting Championships she won a silver medal in 50 m rifle 3 positions team, along with Katrine Lund and Jeanette Hegg Duestad. She won a bronze medal in 50 m rifle 3 positions mixed team, along with Simon Claussen.

She represented Norway at the 2020 Summer Olympics in Tokyo 2021, competing in women's 10 metre air rifle and in 50 metre rifle three positions.

=== 2022 ===
Competing at the 2022 ISSF World Shooting Championships in Cairo, she won a silver medal in 50 m rifle 3 positions, behind winner Miao Wanru, and ahead of bronze winner Jeanette Hegg Duestad. This result also earned Norway a quota place for the 2024 Summer Olympics. Stene won a gold medal in 50 m rifle 3 positions mixed team, together with Simon Claussen. They defeated Denmark in the final.

=== 2023 ===
At the 2023 European 10 m Events Championships in Tallinn, she won a gold medal in 10 m air rifle team, with Jeanette Hegg Duestad and Katrine Lund. She also won a bronze final against Sweden in 10 m air rifle mixed team, teamed with Henrik Larsen, and placed 6th in the individual 10 m air rifle.

She won a gold medal in 50 m rifle (match) at the 2023 European Games, ahead of Natalia Kochańska. She was also part of the Norwegian winning team in 50 m rifle (team match) at the games, along with Mari Bårdseng Løvseth and Jeanette Hegg Duestad. At the same European Games she also won a silver medal in 10 m air rifle team, along with Jeanette Hegg Duestad and Milda Marina Haugen, after being defeated by Switzerland in the gold medal match. She also won a bronze medal at the games in mixed team, along with Simon Claussen.

At the 2023 ISSF World Shooting Championships in Baku, she won a silver medal in 50 m rifle prone team, along with Mari Bårdseng Løvseth and Jeanette Hegg Duestad, close behind the winning Swiss team. She won a bronze medal in 50 m rifle 3 positions team, along with Jeanette Hegg Duestad and Mari Bårdseng Løvseth. She placed 7th in 50 m rifle 3 positions, in the individual contest.

=== 2024 ===
In May 2024 she won a team silver medal for Norway (behind Switzerland) in 50 metre rifle match at the 2024 European Championships 25m & 50m events in Osijek, along with team mates Jeanette Hegg Duestad and Mari Bårdseng Løvseth.

She was selected to represent Norway at the 2024 Summer Olympics in Paris. She competed in Women's 50 metre rifle three positions, not qualifying for the final.
