= Jan Lochbihler =

Swiss sports shooter (born 1992)

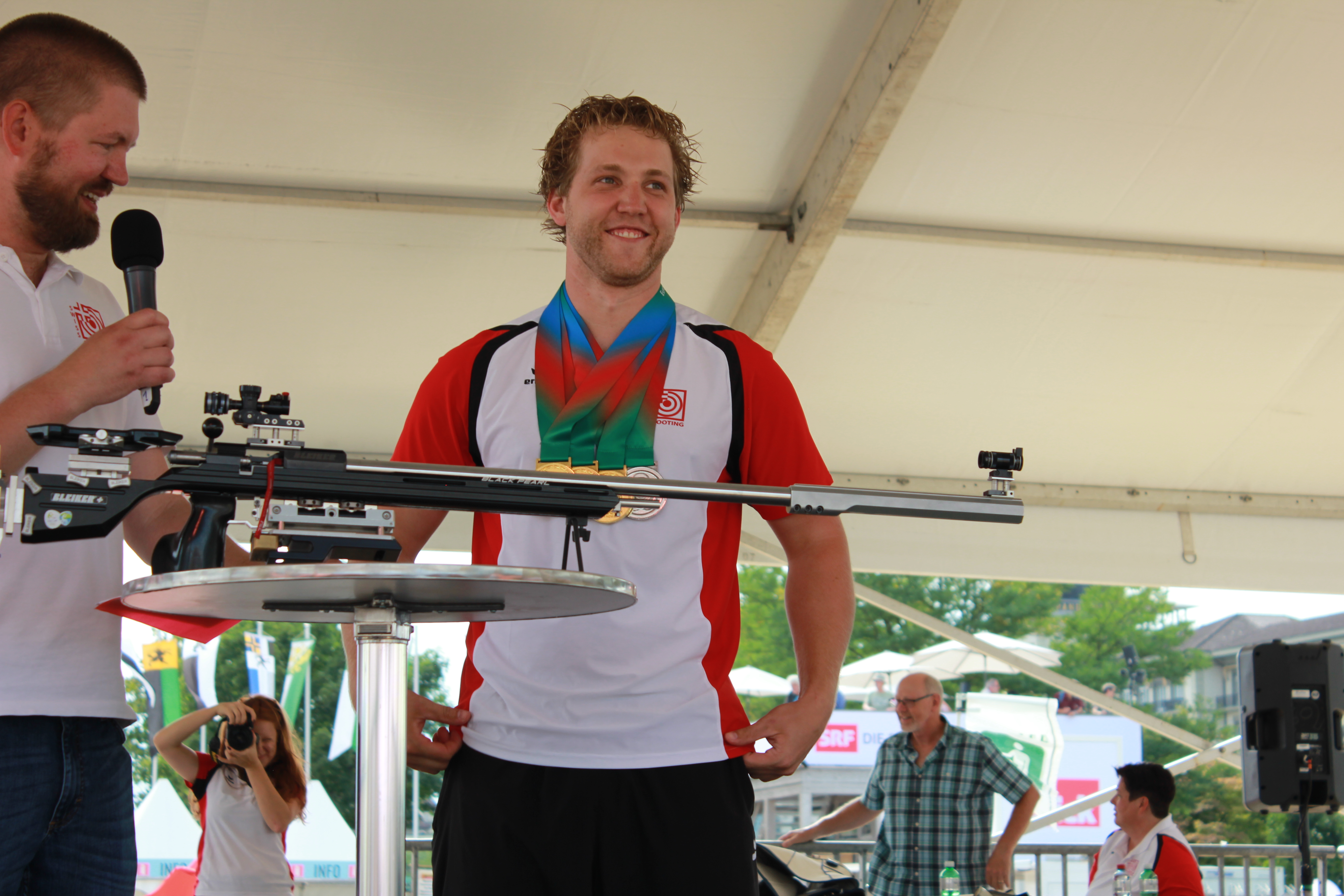

Personal information
- Nationality: Swiss
- Born: 3 March 1992 (age 34) Niederbipp, Switzerland
- Height: 1.88 m (6 ft 2 in)
- Weight: 96 kg (212 lb)

Sport
- Country: Switzerland
- Sport: Shooting
- Event: Air rifle
- Club: Balsthal
Medal record
Men's shooting
Representing Switzerland
World Championships
| Gold medal – first place | 2022 Cairo | 50 m rifle prone |
| Gold medal – first place | 2023 Baku | 50 m rifle prone mixed team |
| Gold medal – first place | 2026 Doha | 50 m rifle prone team |
| Silver medal – second place | 2018 Changwon | 300 m rifle prone team |
| Silver medal – second place | 2018 Changwon | 300 m rifle 3 positions team |
| Silver medal – second place | 2025 Cairo | 50 m rifle prone |
| Silver medal – second place | 2025 Cairo | 50 m rifle prone team |
| Bronze medal – third place | 2018 Changwon | 300 m standard rifle team |
| Bronze medal – third place | 2023 Baku | 50 m rifle prone |
| Bronze medal – third place | 2025 Cairo | 50 m rifle 3 positions team |
European Games
| Gold medal – first place | 2019 Minsk | 50 m rifle prone mixed team |
| Gold medal – first place | 2023 Kraków-Małopolska | 50 m rifle 3 positions mixed team |
European Championships
| Gold medal – first place | 2017 Baku | 300 m standard rifle team |
| Gold medal – first place | 2017 Baku | 300 m rifle prone |
| Gold medal – first place | 2019 Bologna | 300 m rifle mixed team |
| Gold medal – first place | 2021 Osijek | 300 m rifle 3 positions team |
| Gold medal – first place | 2021 Osijek | 300 m rifle 3 positions mixed team |
| Gold medal – first place | 2022 Wrocław | 50 m rifle prone |
| Gold medal – first place | 2025 Osijek | 10 m air rifle mixed team |
| Silver medal – second place | 2017 Baku | 300 m rifle 3 positions team |
| Silver medal – second place | 2019 Bologna | 300 m standard rifle team |
| Silver medal – second place | 2025 Châteauroux | 50 m Rifle Prone Team |
| Bronze medal – third place | 2019 Bologna | 50 m rifle prone team |
| Bronze medal – third place | 2019 Bologna | 300 m rifle prone |
| Bronze medal – third place | 2019 Bologna | 300 m rifle prone team |
| Bronze medal – third place | 2019 Bologna | 300 m rifle 3 positions team |
| Bronze medal – third place | 2021 Osijek | 50 m rifle 3 positions team |
| Bronze medal – third place | 2022 Hamar | 10 m rifle mixed team |
| Bronze medal – third place | 2022 Wrocław | 50 m rifle prone mixed team |
| Bronze medal – third place | 2022 Wrocław | 50 m rifle 3 positions team |

Jan Lochbihler (born 3 March 1992) is a Swiss sports shooter. He competed in the men's 50 metre rifle three positions event at the 2016 Summer Olympics.
