= Du Linshu =

Chinese sport shooter (born 2003)

Personal information
- Native name: 杜林澍
- Nationality: Chinese
- Born: 5 April 2003 (age 23) Hebei Province
- Height: 1.81 m (5 ft 11 in)

Sport
- Sport: Shooting
- Event(s): 10m air rifle 50m rifle 3 positions
Medal record
Men's shooting
Representing China
World Championships
Gold medal – first place	2022 Cairo	50m rifle 3 positions junior
Gold medal – first place	2022 Cairo	50m rifle prone junior
Gold medal – first place	2022 Cairo	50m rifle 3 positions junior mixed team
Gold medal – first place	2022 Cairo	10m air rifle junior mixed team
Gold medal – first place	2022 Cairo	50m rifle prone junior mixed team
Gold medal – first place	2023 Baku	10m air rifle team
Silver medal – second place	2022 Cairo	10m air rifle junior
Silver medal – second place	2022 Cairo	air rifle junior team
Silver medal – second place	2023 Baku	50m rifle prone
Bronze medal – third place	2023 Baku	50m rifle prone team
Bronze medal – third place	2023 Baku	50m rifle prone mixed team
Asian Games
Gold medal – first place	2022 Hangzhou	50m rifle 3 positions
Silver medal – second place	2022 Hangzhou	50m rifle 3 positions team
Bronze medal – third place	2022 Hangzhou	10m air rifle team
Asian Championships
Gold medal – first place	2023 Changwon	50 m rifle 3 positions team
Silver medal – second place	2023 Changwon	50 m rifle prone team
Bronze medal – third place	2023 Changwon	50 m rifle prone
Bronze medal – third place	2023 Changwon	50 m rifle 3 positions

Du Linshu (Chinese: 杜林澍; Pinyin: Dù Línshù; born 5 April 2003) is a Chinese sports shooter. He won a gold medal in the men's 50m rifle 3 positions event at the 2023 ISSF Bhopal World Cup.

== Career ==
Du added an individual silver medal to his career at the 2023 ISSF World Shooting Championships in the men's 50m rifle prone event with a score of 625.2 points.

When China hosted the 2022 Asian Games in Hangzhou, Du demonstrated remarkable resilience under pressure and clinched the gold medal in the men's 50m rifle 3 positions event, setting a new Asian Games record of 460.6 points. He also secured the silver medal in the men's 50m rifle 3 positions team event, with his fellow shooters Tian Jiaming and Yu Hao.
