= Henrik Larsen (sport shooter) =

Norwegian sport shooter (born 1997)

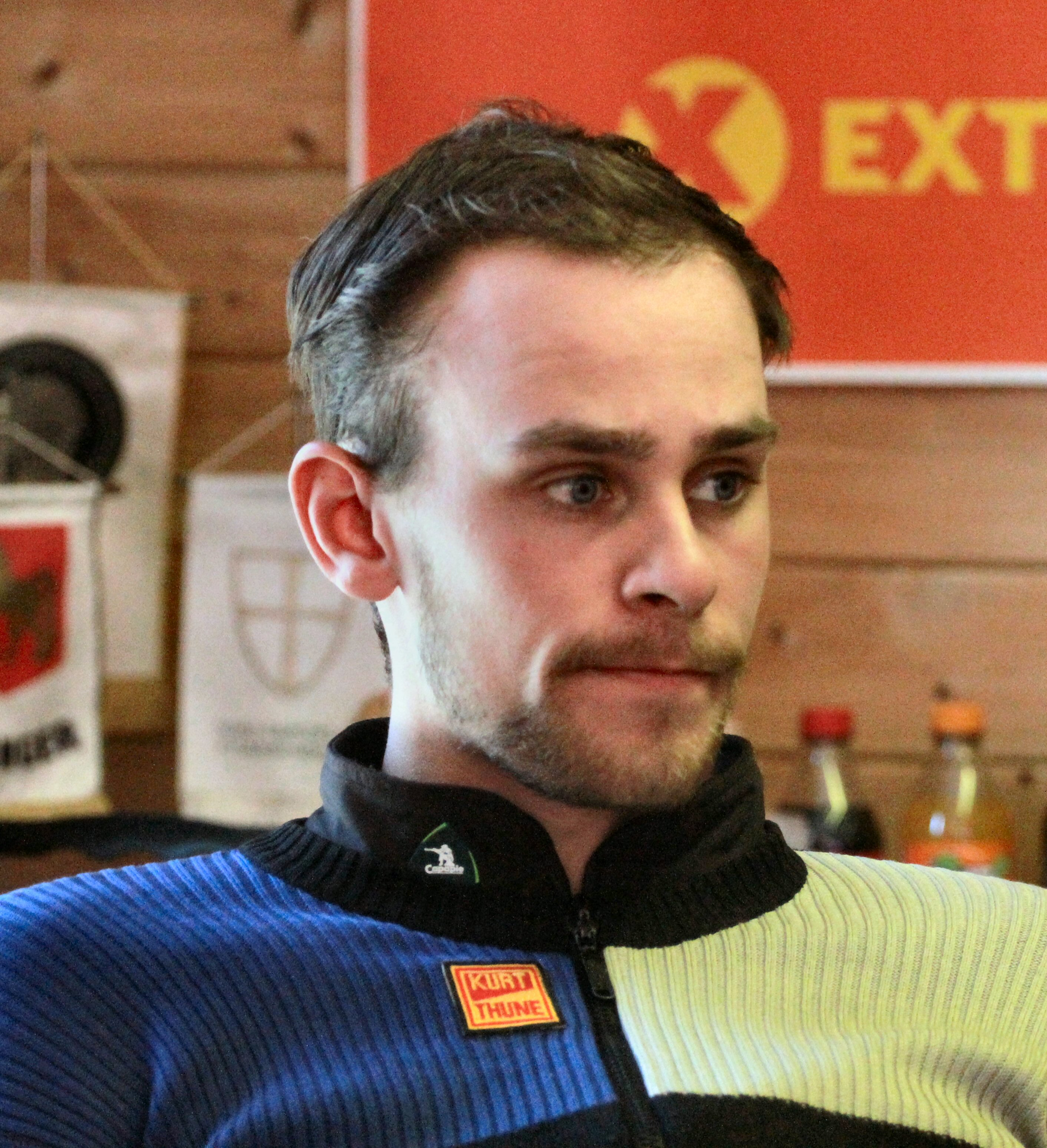

Personal information
- Nationality: Norwegian
- Born: 8 September 1997 (age 29) Fredrikstad, Norway

Sport
- Sport: Shooting
- Club: Krapfoss
Medal record
Men's shooting
Representing Norway
World Championships
| Gold medal – first place | 2022 Cairo | 50 m rifle 3 positions team |
| Gold medal – first place | 2023 Baku | 50 m rifle prone team |
| Silver medal – second place | 2026 Doha | 50 m rifle 3 positions team |
| Bronze medal – third place | 2023 Baku | 50 m rifle 3 positions team |
| Bronze medal – third place | 2026 Doha | 10 m air rifle team |
European Championships
| Gold medal – first place | 2019 Bologna | 50 m rifle 3 positions team |
| Gold medal – first place | 2021 Osijek | 50 m rifle prone |
| Gold medal – first place | 2025 Croatia | 10 m air rifle team |
| Gold medal – first place | 2025 Châteauroux | 50 m Rifle 3 Positions Team |
| Gold medal – first place | 2025 Châteauroux | 50 m Rifle Prone Team |
| Gold medal – first place | 2026 Yerevan | 10 m air rifle team |
| Silver medal – second place | 2021 Osijek | 50 m rifle 3 positions |
| Silver medal – second place | 2021 Osijek | 50 m rifle 3 positions team |
| Silver medal – second place | 2022 Hamar | 10 m rifle |
| Silver medal – second place | 2022 Wrocław | 50 m rifle prone mixed team |
| Silver medal – second place | 2022 Wrocław | 50 m rifle 3 positions team |
| Bronze medal – third place | 2023 Tallinn | 10 m air rifle mixed team |

Henrik Larsen (born 8 September 1997) is a Norwegian sport shooter. His achievements include individual gold and silver medals at the European championships, and team gold medals both in World and European championships. He holds a team world record in 50 metre rifle three positions since 2021.

== Biography ==
Larsen was born in Fredrikstad on 8 September 1997.

He enrolled at the University of Kentucky (UK) in 2017, but only spent the 2017–18 school year there. During his year at UK, he competed for the school's rifle team, leading the Wildcats to an NCAA team title, winning the individual NCAA title in air rifle, and being named a first-team All-American in all three possible disciplines (air rifle, smallbore, aggregate).

=== 2021 ===
Competing at the 2021 European Shooting Championships in Croatia, Larsen won an individual gold medal in 50 m rifle prone. This was Larsen's first international medal in senior championships. He won a silver medal in 50 m rifle 3 positions, behind winner Jon-Hermann Hegg. Together with Simon Claussen, who placed 7th in the final, these three set a new world record for teams in the qualifications, with 3549 points, all three qualifying for the final. He won a silver medal in 50 m rifle 3 positions team, along with Jon-Hermann Hegg and Simon Claussen.

He represented Norway at the 2020 Summer Olympics in Tokyo 2021, competing in men's 10 m air rifle and in 50 metre rifle three positions.

=== 2022 ===
At the 2022 ISSF World Shooting Championships in Cairo he won a gold medal in 50 m rifle 3 positions team, along with Simon Claussen and Jon-Hermann Hegg, after defeating a French team in the final match.

=== 2023 ===
At the 2023 European 10 m Events Championships in Tallinn, he won the bronze final against Sweden in 10 m air rifle mixed team, teamed with Jenny Stene.

Competing at the 2023 ISSF World Shooting Championships in Baku, he won the team gold medal in 50 m rifle prone, along with Ole Martin Halvorsen and Jon-Hermann Hegg. He won a bronze medal in 50 m rifle 3 positions team, along with Ole Martin Halvorsen and Jon-Hermann Hegg.

=== 2024 ===
In May 2024 Larsen won a team gold medal in 50 metre rifle match at the European Championships with the Norwegian team, along with Jon-Hermann Hegg and Ole Martin Halvorsen. He placed seventh in the final in the individual contest.

=== 2025 ===
In March 2025 Larsen won a team gold medal in 10m air rifle at the European championships, along with Jon-Hermann Hegg and Ole Martin Halvorsen.

== Records ==
World record held in 50 metre rifle three positions (2021–)
| Men's | Teams | 3549 | Norway (Claussen, Larsen, Hegg) | 29 May 2021 | Osijek (CRO) |
