= Katrine Lund =

Norwegian sport shooter (born 1994)

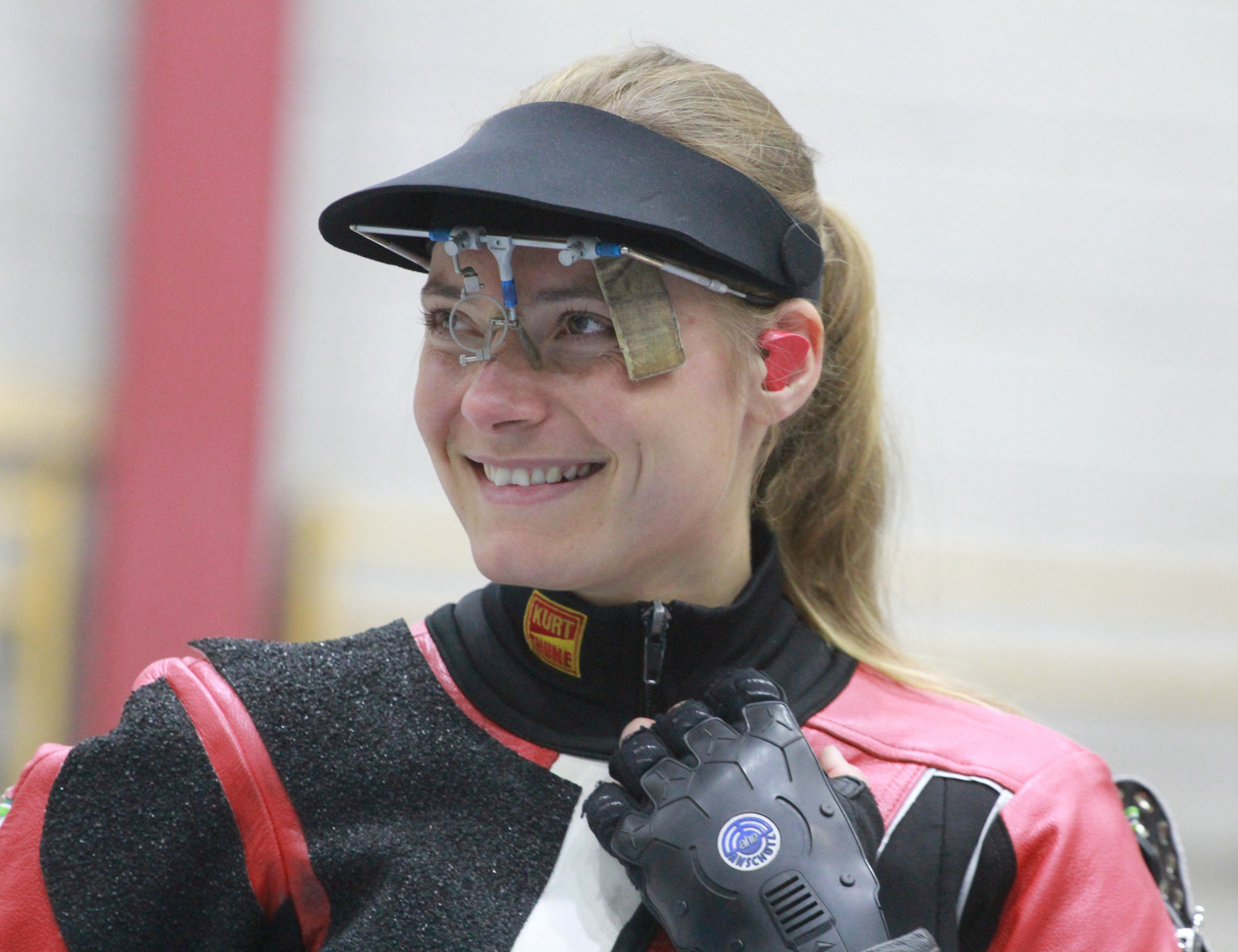

Personal information
- Full name: Katrine Aanestad Lund
- Born: 9 November 1994 (age 31) Kongsberg, Norway

Sport
- Sport: Shooting
- Club: Elverum Rifle Klubb
- Coached by: Espen Berg-Knutsen
Medal record
World Championships
Gold medal – first place	2022 Cairo	300 m rifle 3 positions team
Gold medal – first place	2022 Cairo	300 m rifle prone team
Gold medal – first place	2023 Baku	300 m rifle 3 positions
Gold medal – first place	2023 Baku	300 m rifle 3 positions team
Gold medal – first place	2025 Cairo	300 m rifle 3 positions
Gold medal – first place	2025 Cairo	300 m standard rifle
Gold medal – first place	2025 Cairo	300 m standard rifle
Silver medal – second place	2023 Baku	300 m rifle prone team
Bronze medal – third place	2025 Cairo	300 m rifle prone
European Championships
Gold medal – first place	2023 Tallinn	10 m air rifle team
Silver medal – second place	2021 Osijek	50 m rifle 3 positions team
Silver medal – second place	2022 Hamar	10 m air rifle team

Katrine Aannestad Lund (born 9 November 1994) is a Norwegian sport shooter. Her achievements include winning individual gold medals in rifle shooting at the 2023 and 2025 ISSF World Shooting Championships, and several team medals at the world championships.

== Personal life ==
Lund was born in Kongsberg in 1994. She grew up in Jondalen and is a sister of sport shooter Kim-André Lund.

== Career ==
=== 2021 ===
At the 2021 European Shooting Championships, she won a silver medal in 50 m rifle 3 positions team, along with Jeanette Hegg Duestad and Jenny Stene. She also competed in 10 m air rifle team, along with Jeanette Hegg Duestad and Jenny Stene, and they reached the bronze final where they were defeated by Romania.

=== 2022 ===
Competing at the 2022 ISSF World Shooting Championships, Lund won a gold medal in 300 m rifle 3 positions team, with team mates Jeanette Hegg Duestad and Jenny Vatne, defeating the Swiss team in the final. With Duestad and Vatne, she also won gold medal in 300 m rifle prone team.

=== 2023 ===
Competing at the 2023 European 10 m Events Championships in Tallinn, she won a gold medal in 10 m air rifle team, with Jeanette Hegg Duestad and Jenny Stene. She placed 13th in the individual 10 m air rifle, having missed the final by a small margin.

At the 2023 ISSF World Shooting Championships in Baku, she won a gold medal in 300 m rifle 3 positions, ahead of Karolina Romanczyk and Silvia Guignard. This was Lund's very first individual victory in an international championship. She also won a gold medal with the Norwegian team, along with Jeanette Hegg Duestad and Jenny Vatne. Further, she won a silver medal in 300 m rifle prone team, along with Duestad and Vatne, at the 2023 world championships.

=== 2024 ===
In May 2024 Lund won a gold medal in 300 metre rifle match at the European Championships, as well as a team gold medal with the Norwegian team, along with Jenny Vatne and Oda Flekkerud.

=== 2025 ===
She won a gold medal in 300 metre rifle three positions at the 2025 ISSF World Shooting Championships in Cairo. She won another gold medal in 300 m standard rifle open class, ahead of Jiří Přívratský.
