= Amalie Evensen =

Norwegian sport shooter (born 2000)

Personal information
- Nationality: Norwegian
- Born: 8 June 2000 (age 26)

Sport
- Sport: Shooting
- Events: 10 metre air rifle; 50 metre rifle three positions
- Club: Kisen SSK
- Coached by: Kim André Aannestad Lund
Medal record
European Championships
Gold medal – first place	2025 Osijek	10 m air rifle team

Amalie Evensen (born 8 June 2000) is a Norwegian sport shooter. She was the 2024 Norwegian Champion in 10m Air Rifle.

In March 2025 at the European 10 m Events Championships in Osijek, Evensen won a gold medal in team air rifle, along with Mari Bårdseng Løvseth and Jeanette Hegg Duestad, setting a new European Record of 1896.9.

In the 2025-26 season of the German Bundesliga, Evensen competed as an international athlete for Wissener SV.
