= 2023 ISSF World Shooting Championships =

Shooting competition

- Location: Baku, Azerbaijan
- Dates: 14 August - 1 September
- Competitors: 1249 from 101 nations

The 53rd ISSF World Shooting Championships were held in Baku, Azerbaijan from 14 August to 1 September 2023. They also served as a qualification event for the 2024 Summer Olympics.

== Medal table ==
* Host nation (Azerbaijan)

| Rank | Nation | Gold | Silver | Bronze | Total |
|---|---|---|---|---|---|
| 1 | China (CHN) | 15 | 7 | 6 | 28 |
| 2 | Ukraine (UKR) | 6 | 4 | 2 | 12 |
| 3 | India (IND) | 6 | 0 | 8 | 14 |
| 4 | Switzerland (SUI) | 5 | 4 | 4 | 13 |
| 5 | United States (USA) | 5 | 2 | 3 | 10 |
| 6 | Norway (NOR) | 4 | 3 | 4 | 11 |
| 7 | Germany (GER) | 3 | 5 | 8 | 16 |
| 8 | Poland (POL) | 3 | 3 | 0 | 6 |
| 9 | Austria (AUT) | 3 | 2 | 2 | 7 |
| 10 | Sweden (SWE) | 2 | 4 | 1 | 7 |
| 11 | Kazakhstan (KAZ) | 2 | 2 | 1 | 5 |
| 12 | Greece (GRE) | 1 | 3 | 1 | 5 |
| 12 | Italy (ITA) | 1 | 3 | 1 | 5 |
| 14 | Czech Republic (CZE) | 1 | 2 | 2 | 5 |
| 15 | Azerbaijan (AZE)* | 1 | 2 | 0 | 3 |
| 16 | Slovakia (SVK) | 1 | 1 | 1 | 3 |
| 17 | Chinese Taipei (TPE) | 1 | 1 | 0 | 2 |
| 17 | Hungary (HUN) | 1 | 1 | 0 | 2 |
| 19 | Croatia (CRO) | 1 | 0 | 1 | 2 |
| 20 | Portugal (POR) | 1 | 0 | 0 | 1 |
| 20 | Slovenia (SLO) | 1 | 0 | 0 | 1 |
| 22 | Finland (FIN) | 0 | 4 | 4 | 8 |
| 23 | South Korea (KOR) | 0 | 3 | 4 | 7 |
| 24 | France (FRA) | 0 | 1 | 3 | 4 |
| 25 | Mongolia (MGL) | 0 | 1 | 2 | 3 |
| 26 | Iran (IRI) | 0 | 1 | 1 | 2 |
| 26 | Latvia (LAT) | 0 | 1 | 1 | 2 |
| 28 | Australia (AUS) | 0 | 1 | 0 | 1 |
| 28 | Estonia (EST) | 0 | 1 | 0 | 1 |
| 28 | Serbia (SRB) | 0 | 1 | 0 | 1 |
| 28 | Turkey (TUR) | 0 | 1 | 0 | 1 |
| 32 | Bulgaria (BUL) | 0 | 0 | 1 | 1 |
| 32 | Egypt (EGY) | 0 | 0 | 1 | 1 |
| 32 | Great Britain (GBR) | 0 | 0 | 1 | 1 |
| 32 | Kuwait (KUW) | 0 | 0 | 1 | 1 |
| Totals (35 entries) | | 64 | 64 | 64 | 192 |

Source: Standings

== Medal summary ==
=== Men ===
Non-Olympic event

| Event | Gold | | Silver | | Bronze | |
|---|---|---|---|---|---|---|
| 10 m air pistol | Zhang Bowen; China | 244.3 | Damir Mikec; Serbia | 240.8 | Kiril Kirov; Bulgaria | 215.7 |
| 10 m air pistol team | China (CHN); Zhang Bowen; Liu Junhui; Xie Yu | 1749 | Germany (GER); Robin Walter; Michael Schwald; Paul Fröhlich | 1743 | India (IND); Shiva Narwal; Sarabjot Singh; Arjun Singh Cheema | 1734 |
| 25 m center fire pistol | Christian Reitz; Germany | 584-23x | Peeter Olesk; Estonia | 584-17x | Florian Peter; Germany | 583 |
| 25 m center fire pistol team | Germany (GER); Christian Reitz; Florian Peter; Oliver Geis | 1743 | South Korea (KOR); Jang Dae-kyu; Song Jong-ho; Choe Bo-ram | 1731 | India (IND); Rajendra Bagul; Akshay Jain; Gaurav Chaudhary | 1718 |
| 25 m rapid fire pistol | Li Yuehong; China | 39 WR | Clément Bessaguet; France | 30 | Florian Peter; Germany | 24 |
| 25 m rapid fire pistol team | China (CHN); Wang Xinjie; Li Yuehong; Liu Yangpan | 1756 EWR | Germany (GER); Florian Peter; Oliver Geis; Christian Reitz | 1740 | South Korea (KOR); Song Jong-ho; Lee Gun-hyeok; Kim Seo-jun | 1739 |
| 25 m standard pistol | Amanpreet Singh; India | 577 | Lee Gun-hyeok; South Korea | 574-17x | Kevin Chapon; France | 574-11x |
| 25 m standard pistol team | China (CHN); Wang Xinjie; Liu Yangpan; Li Yuehong | 1707 | Germany (GER); Florian Peter; Christian Reitz; Oliver Geis | 1700 | South Korea (KOR); Lee Gun-hyeok; Song Jong-ho; Jang Dae-kyu | 1697 |
| 50 m pistol | Xie Yu; China | 558 | Lauris Strautmanis; Latvia | 557 | Ravinder Singh; India | 556 |
| 50 m pistol team | China (CHN); Xie Yu; Zhang Bowen; Liu Junhui | 1655 | South Korea (KOR); Han Seung-woo; Choe Bo-ram; Kim Cheong-yong | 1654 | India (IND); Ravinder Singh; Kamaljeet; Vikram Jagannath Shinde | 1646 |
| 10 m air rifle | Victor Lindgren; Sweden | 251.3 | Yang Haoran; China | 250.6 | František Smetana; Czech Republic | 227.5 |
| 10 m air rifle team | China (CHN); Yang Haoran; Du Linshu; Yu Haonan | 1893.3 WR | Czech Republic (CZE); František Smetana; Jiří Přívratský; David Hrčkulák | 1884.3 | Croatia (CRO); Petar Gorša; Miran Maričić; Josip Sikavica | 1883.5 |
| 50 m rifle prone | Petr Nymburský; Czech Republic | 626.5 | Du Linshu; China | 625.2 | Jan Lochbihler; Switzerland | 625.0 |
| 50 m rifle prone team | Norway (NOR); Henrik Larsen; Jon-Hermann Hegg; Ole Martin Halvorsen | 1866.0 | Germany (GER); Max Braun; Maximilian Dallinger; David Könders | 1864.5 | China (CHN); Du Linshu; Tian Jiaming; Yu Hao | 1863.4 |
| 50 m rifle 3 positions | Alexander Schmirl; Austria | 462.6 | Petr Nymburský; Czech Republic | 459.2 | Akhil Sheoran; India | 450.0 |
| 50 m rifle 3 positions team | India (IND); Aishwary Pratap Singh Tomar; Niraj Kumar; Akhil Sheoran | 1750 | Austria (AUT); Alexander Schmirl; Andreas Thum; Patrick Diem | 1749 | Norway (NOR); Henrik Larsen; Ole Martin Halvorsen; Jon-Hermann Hegg | 1748 |
| 300 m rifle prone | Rajmond Debevec; Slovenia | 600 EWR | Aleksi Leppä; Finland | 599-40x | Timothy Sherry; United States | 599-36x |
| 300 m rifle prone team | Norway (NOR); Simon Claussen; Kim Andre Lund; Odd Arne Brekne | 1789 | Poland (POL); Daniel Romańczyk; Tomasz Bartnik; Maciej Kowalewicz | 1778 | Switzerland (SUI); Gilles Dufaux; Pascal Bachmann; Sandro Greuter | 1777 |
| 300 m rifle 3 positions | Maciej Kowalewicz; Poland | 587 | Tomasz Bartnik; Poland | 586-20x | Pascal Bachmann; Switzerland | 586-18x |
| 300 m rifle 3 positions team | Switzerland (SUI); Pascal Bachmann; Gilles Dufaux; Sandro Greuter | 1750 | Austria (AUT); Bernhard Pickl; Andreas Thum; Alexander Schmirl | 1746 | Norway (NOR); Simon Claussen; Kim Andre Lund; Odd Arne Brekne | 1743 |
| 10 m running target | Ihor Kizyma; Ukraine | | Kris Großheim; Germany | | Jeong You-jin; South Korea | |
| 10 m running target team | Ukraine (UKR); Ihor Kizyma; Denys Babliuk; Danylo Danilenko | 1703 | Sweden (SWE); Jesper Nyberg; Emil Martinsson; Mats Eliasson | 1685 | Finland (FIN); Niklas Hyvärinen; Aaro Juhani Vuorimaa; Krister Holmberg | 1684 |
| 10 m running target mixed | Denys Babliuk; Ukraine | 384 | Ihor Kizyma; Ukraine | 381-16x | Kris Großheim; Germany | 381-12x |
| 10 m running target mixed team | Ukraine (UKR); Denys Babliuk; Ihor Kizyma; Danylo Danilenko | 1131 | Finland (FIN); Aaro Juhani Vuorimaa; Krister Holmberg; Niklas Hyvärinen | 1122 | South Korea (KOR); Jeong You-jin; Ha Kwang-chul; Kwak Yong-bin | 1118 |
| Skeet | Efthimios Mitas; Greece | 56 | Eetu Kallioinen; Finland | 55 | Azmy Mehelba; Egypt | 46 |
| Skeet team | United States (USA); Vincent Hancock; Christian Elliott; Dustan Taylor | 369 | Greece (GRE); Efthimios Mitas; Charalambos Chalkiadakis; Nikolaos Mavrommatis | 366 | Italy (ITA); Gabriele Rossetti; Tammaro Cassandro; Erik Pittini | 365 |
| Trap | Giovanni Cernogoraz; Croatia | 44 | Marián Kovačócy; Slovakia | 41 | Khaled Al-Mudhaf; Kuwait | 31 |
| Trap team | United States (USA); William Hinton; Derrick Mein; Derek Haldeman | 368 | Italy (ITA); Giovanni Pellielo; Massimo Fabbrizi; Daniele Resca | 367 | Czech Republic (CZE); Jiří Lipták; Pavel Vaněk; David Kostelecký | 365 |

=== Women ===
Non-Olympic event

| Event | Gold | | Silver | | Bronze | |
|---|---|---|---|---|---|---|
| 10 m air pistol | Jiang Ranxin; China | 239.8 | Anna Korakaki; Greece | 238.3 | Li Xue; China | 218.9 |
| 10 m air pistol team | China (CHN); Jiang Ranxin; Li Xue; Qian Wei | 1728 | Hungary (HUN); Sára Fábián; Veronika Major; Miriam Jákó | 1726 | Iran (IRI); Golnoush Sebghatollahi; Hanieh Rostamian; Mina Ghorbani | 1724 |
| 25 m center fire pistol | Nigar Nasirova; Azerbaijan | 554-12x | Narmina Samadova; Azerbaijan | 554-10x | Khishigdelger Enkhbat; Mongolia | 538 |
| 25 m pistol | Doreen Vennekamp; Germany | 40 EWR | Olena Kostevych; Ukraine | 31 | Agate Rašmane; Latvia | 25 |
| 25 m pistol team | India (IND); Rhythm Sangwan; Esha Singh; Manu Bhaker | 1744 | Chinese Taipei (TPE); Tien Chia-chen; Tu Yi Yi-tzu; Wu Chia-ying | 1743 | China (CHN); Feng Sixuan; Zhao Nan; Liu Rui | 1743 |
| 25 m standard pistol | Feng Sixuan; China | 572 | Anna Korakaki; Greece | 565 | Sylvia Steiner; Austria | 561 |
| 25 m standard pistol team | China (CHN); Feng Sixuan; Zhao Nan; Liu Rui | 1690 | Azerbaijan (AZE); Zeynab Sultanova; Nigar Nasirova; Narmina Samadova | 1629 | India (IND); Tiyana Tiyana; Yashita Shokeen; Kritika Sharma | 1601 |
| 50 m pistol | Sylvia Steiner; Austria | 540 | Bayartsetseg Tumurchudur; Mongolia | 534 | Tiyana Tiyana; India | 533 |
| 50 m pistol team | India (IND); Tiyana Tiyana; Sakshi Anil Suryavanshi; Kirandeep Kaur | 1573 | China (CHN); Jiang Ranxin; Li Xue; Qian Wei | 1567 | Mongolia (MGL); Bayartsetseg Tumurchudur; Khishigdelger Enkhbat; Tsolmonbaataryn Anudari | 1566 |
| 10 m air rifle | Han Jiayu; China | 251.4 | Wang Zhilin; China | 250.2 | Mehuli Ghosh; India | 229.8 |
| 10 m air rifle team | India (IND); Mehuli Ghosh; Tilottama Sen; Ramita Ramita | 1895.9 | China (CHN); Han Jiayu; Wang Zhilin; Zhang Qiongyue | 1893.7 | Germany (GER); Larissa Weindorf; Anna Janssen; Lisa Müller | 1887.5 |
| 50 m rifle prone | Anja Senti; Switzerland | 627.7 | Marianne Palo; Finland | 626.1 | Jolyn Beer; Germany | 625.4 |
| 50 m rifle prone team | Switzerland (SUI); Anja Senti; Chiara Leone; Sarina Hitz | 1870.4 | Norway (NOR); Jeanette Hegg Duestad; Jenny Stene; Mari Bårdseng Løvseth | 1870.2 | Austria (AUT); Sheileen Waibel; Nadine Ungerank; Rebecca Köck | 1863.3 |
| 50 m rifle 3 positions | Zhang Qiongyue; China | 465.3 | Han Jiayu; China | 463.5 | Sagen Maddalena; United States | 451.9 |
| 50 m rifle 3 positions team | United States (USA); Sagen Maddalena; Mary Carolynn Tucker; Sarah Beard | 1774-102x WR | China (CHN); Zhang Qiongyue; Xia Siyu; Han Jiayu | 1773-111x | Norway (NOR); Jeanette Hegg Duestad; Jenny Stene; Mari Bårdseng Løvseth | 1767-99x |
| 300 m rifle prone | Karolina Romańczyk; Poland | 593 | Silvia Guignard; Switzerland | 592-31x | Agathe Girard; France | 592-30 |
| 300 m rifle prone team | Switzerland (SUI); Silvia Guignard; Anja Senti; Michèle Bertschi | 1769 | Norway (NOR); Jenny Vatne; Katrine Lund; Jeanette Hegg Duestad | 1768 | Germany (GER); Lisa Müller; Anna-Lena Geuther; Veronique Münster | 1756 |
| 300 m rifle 3 positions | Katrine Lund; Norway | 581 | Karolina Romanczyk; Poland | 579-19x | Silvia Guignard; Switzerland | 579-17x |
| 300 m rifle 3 positions team | Norway (NOR); Katrine Lund; Jeanette Hegg Duestad; Jenny Vatne | 1728 | Switzerland (SUI); Silvia Guignard; Anja Senti; Michele Bertschi | 1716 | Germany (GER); Lisa Müller; Anna-Lena Geuther; Veronique Münster | 1690 |
| 10 m running target | Zukhra Irnazarova; Kazakhstan | | Alexandra Saduakassova; Kazakhstan | | Halyna Avramenko; Ukraine | |
| 10 m running target team | Ukraine (UKR); Halyna Avramenko; Viktoriya Rybovalova; Valentyna Honcharova | 1664 | Kazakhstan (KAZ); Zukhra Irnazarova; Alexandra Saduakassova; Fatima Irnazarova | 1658 | Not awarded | |
| 10 m running target mixed | Alexandra Saduakassova; Kazakhstan | 378-9x | Zukhra Irnazarova; Kazakhstan | 378-11x | Valentyna Honcharova; Ukraine | 370 |
| 10 m running target mixed team | Kazakhstan (KAZ); Alexandra Saduakassova; Zukhra Irnazarova; Fatima Irnazarova | 1121 | Ukraine (UKR); Valentyna Honcharova; Halyna Avramenko; Viktoriya Rybovalova | 1107 | Not awarded | |
| Skeet | Danka Barteková; Slovakia | 54 +11 | Dania Jo Vizzi; United States | 54 +10 | Emmanouela Katzouraki; Greece | 43 |
| Skeet team | United States (USA); Austen Smith; Dania Jo Vizzi; Samantha Simonton | 365 | Italy (ITA); Martina Bartolomei; Diana Bacosi; Simona Scocchetti | 360 | Slovakia (SVK); Danka Barteková; Vanesa Hocková; Monika Štibravá | 359 |
| Trap | Lin Yi-chun; Chinese Taipei | 40 | Jessica Rossi; Italy | 39 | Kathrin Murche; Germany | 28 |
| Trap team | Italy (ITA); Jessica Rossi; Silvana Stanco; Maria Lucia Palmitessa | 354 EWR | Australia (AUS); Penny Smith; Laetisha Scanlan; Catherine Skinner | 353 | China (CHN); Wu Cuicui; Li Qingnian; Zhang Xinqiu | 349 |

=== Mixed ===
Non-Olympic event

| Event | Gold | Silver | Bronze |
|---|---|---|---|
| 10 m air rifle team | China (CHN); Huang Yuting; Sheng Lihao | Iran (IRI); Shermineh Chehel Amirani; Amir Mohammad Nekounam | France (FRA); Océanne Muller; Romain Aufrere |
| 10 m air pistol team | India (IND); Esha Singh; Shiva Narwal | Turkey (TUR); Şevval İlayda Tarhan; Yusuf Dikeç | China (CHN); Jiang Ranxin; Zhang Bowen |
| 50 m rifle prone team | Switzerland (SUI); Chiara Leone; Jan Lochbihler | Switzerland (SUI); Sarina Hitz; Christoph Dürr | China (CHN); Xia Siyu; Du Linshu |
| Skeet team | United States (USA); Vincent Hancock; Austen Smith | Ukraine (UKR); Mikola Milchev; Iryna Malovichko | Great Britain (GBR); Ben Llewellin; Amber Rutter |
| Trap team | Portugal (POR); Maria Ines Coelho De Barros; João Azevedo | United States (USA); Rachel Tozier; Derrick Mein | Kazakhstan (KAZ); Mariya Dmitriyenko; Daniel Pochivalov |
| 300 m standard rifle open | István Péni; Hungary | Kim Andre Lund; Norway | Timothy Sherry; United States |
| 300 m standard rifle open team | Austria (AUT); Bernhard Pickl; Patrick Diem; Andreas Thum | Switzerland (SUI); Sandro Greuter; Gilles Vincent Dufaux; Pascal Bachmann | Norway (NOR); Simon Claussen; Kim Andre Lund; Odd Arne Brekne |
| 50 m running target open | Łukasz Czapla; Poland | Ihor Kizyma; Ukraine | Emil Martinsson; Sweden |
| 50 m running target open team | Ukraine (UKR); Ihor Kizyma; Danylo Danilenko; Denys Babliuk | Sweden (SWE); Emil Martinsson; Andreas Bergström; Jesper Nyberg | Finland (FIN); Aaro Vuorimaa; Krister Holmberg; Niklas Hyvärinen |
| 50 m running target mixed open | Jesper Nyberg; Sweden | Emil Martinsson; Sweden | Krister Holmberg; Finland |
| 50 m running target mixed open team | Ukraine (UKR); Denys Babliuk; Danylo Danilenko; Ihor Kizyma | Sweden (SWE); Emil Martinsson; Andreas Bergström; Jesper Nyberg | Finland (FIN); Krister Holmberg; Aaro Vuorimaa; Niklas Hyvärinen |

== Nations ==
101 nations, 1,249 athletes and 2,378 starts:

1. Afghanistan (1)
2. Albania (6)
3. Algeria (9)
4. Argentina (5)
5. Armenia (6)
6. Australia (14)
7. Austria (22)
8. Azerbaijan (29) (Host)
9. Bahrain (17)
10. Bangladesh (10)
11. Barbados (2)
12. Belgium (5)
13. Bosnia and Herzegovina (2)
14. Brazil (13)
15. Bulgaria (15)
16. Canada (13)
17. Chile (4)
18. China (36)
19. Chinese Taipei (19)
20. Colombia (4)
21. Croatia (13)
22. Cuba (7)
23. Cyprus (10)
24. Czech Republic (29)
25. Denmark (9)
26. Dominican Republic (6)
27. Ecuador (4)
28. Egypt (24)
29. El Salvador (2)
30. Estonia (17)
31. Finland (23)
32. France (25)
33. Georgia (9)
34. Germany (44)
35. Great Britain (20)
36. Greece (9)
37. Guatemala (7)
38. Hong Kong (3)
39. Hungary (19)
40. Iceland (2)
41. Indonesia (6)
42. India (53)
43. Iran (22)
44. Ireland (5)
45. Israel (3)
46. Italy (28)
47. Japan (30)
48. Jordan (1)
49. Kazakhstan (38)
50. Kosovo (4)
51. Kuwait (18)
52. Kyrgyzstan (7)
53. Latvia (11)
54. Lebanon (3)
55. Libya (4)
56. Lithuania (4)
57. Luxembourg (1)
58. Malaysia (6)
59. Maldives (1)
60. Malta (8)
61. Moldova (1)
62. Mexico (11)
63. Mongolia (15)
64. Montenegro (3)
65. Morocco (7)
66. Namibia (3)
67. Netherlands (3)
68. New Zealand (4)
69. Nigeria (6)
70. North Macedonia (2)
71. Norway (23)
72. Oman (17)
73. Pakistan (10)
74. Panama (1)
75. Peru (11)
76. Philippines (5)
77. Poland (21)
78. Portugal (11)
79. Puerto Rico (1)
80. Qatar (25)
81. Refugee Team (1)
82. Romania (2)
83. San Marino (3)
84. Saudi Arabia (9)
85. Serbia (12)
86. Singapore (7)
87. Slovakia (18)
88. Slovenia (7)
89. South Korea (39)
90. Spain (26)
91. Sweden (26)
92. Switzerland (14)
93. Syria (1)
94. Tajikistan (2)
95. Thailand (16)
96. Turkey (25)
97. Ukraine (26)
98. United Arab Emirates (8)
99. United States (40)
100. Uzbekistan (2)
101. Vietnam (10)

== Incidents ==
=== Armenia's participation ===
Due to ongoing tension between Azerbaijan and Armenia it was feared that this might affect Armenia's participation in the world championships. On 11 July 2023 Head of the Public Relations Department of the Ministry of Youth and Sports of Azerbaijan Qabil Mehdiyev stated that Azerbaijan will ensure the safety of athletes and members of delegations of all participating countries, including representatives from Armenia. This was followed by Armenian Shooting Federation secretary general Arek Saribekyan's statement that Armenia wants to participate in the championships and hopes that the team does not face any obstacles.
