= Odd Arne Brekne =

Norwegian sport shooter (born 1984)

Personal information
- Nationality: Norwegian
- Born: 1 September 1984 (age 41) Farsund, Norway
- Height: 1.82 m (6 ft 0 in)

Sport
- Country: Norway
- Sport: Shooting
- Event: Air rifle
Medal record
World Championships
Gold medal – first place	2018 Changwon	300 m standard rifle team
Gold medal – first place	2023 Baku	300 m rifle prone team
Bronze medal – third place	2018 Changwon	300 m standard rifle
Bronze medal – third place	2018 Changwon	300 m rifle prone team
Bronze medal – third place	2023 Baku	300 m rifle 3 positions team

Odd Arne Brekne (born 1 September 1984) is a Norwegian sport shooter.

== Biography ==
Brekne was born in Farsund on 1 September 1984. He qualified to compete at the 2012 Summer Olympics in London in the men's 50 m rifle prone, where he finished in 13th place.

At the 2023 ISSF World Shooting Championships in Baku, he won a gold medal in 300 m rifle prone team, along with Kim-André Lund and Simon Claussen.

Brekne has won several national titles, and won the King's Cup trophy in 2010 and 2011.
