= Petr Nymburský =

Czech sport shooter (born 1995)

Personal information
- Nationality: Czech
- Born: 1 June 1995 (age 31) Tabor, Czech Republic

Sport
- Sport: Sport shooting
Medal record
World Championships
Gold medal – first place	2023 Baku	50 m rifle prone
Gold medal – first place	2025 Cairo	300 m rifle prone
Gold medal – first place	2025 Cairo	300 m rifle prone team
Gold medal – first place	2026 Doha	50 m rifle 3 positions team
Silver medal – second place	2023 Baku	50 m rifle 3 positions
Silver medal – second place	2026 Doha	50 m rifle prone team
European Games
Silver medal – second place	2023 Kraków-Małopolska	50 m rifle 3 positions team
European Championships
Gold medal – first place	2019 Bologna	50 m rifle 3 positions
Gold medal – first place	2022 Wrocław	50 m rifle 3 positions
Gold medal – first place	2022 Wrocław	50 m rifle 3 positions team
Silver medal – second place	2019 Bologna	50 m rifle 3 positions team
Bronze medal – third place	2025 Châteauroux	300 m Rifle 3 Positions Team

Petr Nymburský (born 1 June 1995) is a Czech sport shooter.
