= Andrea Brühlmann =

Swiss sport shooter

Personal information
- Nationality: Swiss
- Born: 18 January 1984 (age 42) Arbon, Switzerland
- Height: 1.70 m (5 ft 7 in)
- Weight: 64 kg (141 lb)

Sport
- Country: Switzerland
- Sport: Shooting
- Event: Air rifle
- Club: Gossau
Medal record
World Championships
Bronze medal – third place	2018 Changwon	300 m team rifle prone
Bronze medal – third place	2018 Changwon	300 m team rifle 3 positions

Andrea Brühlmann (born 18 January 1984) is a Swiss sport shooter.

She participated at the 2018 ISSF World Shooting Championships, winning a medal.
