= Eva Rösken =

German sports shooter (born 1984)

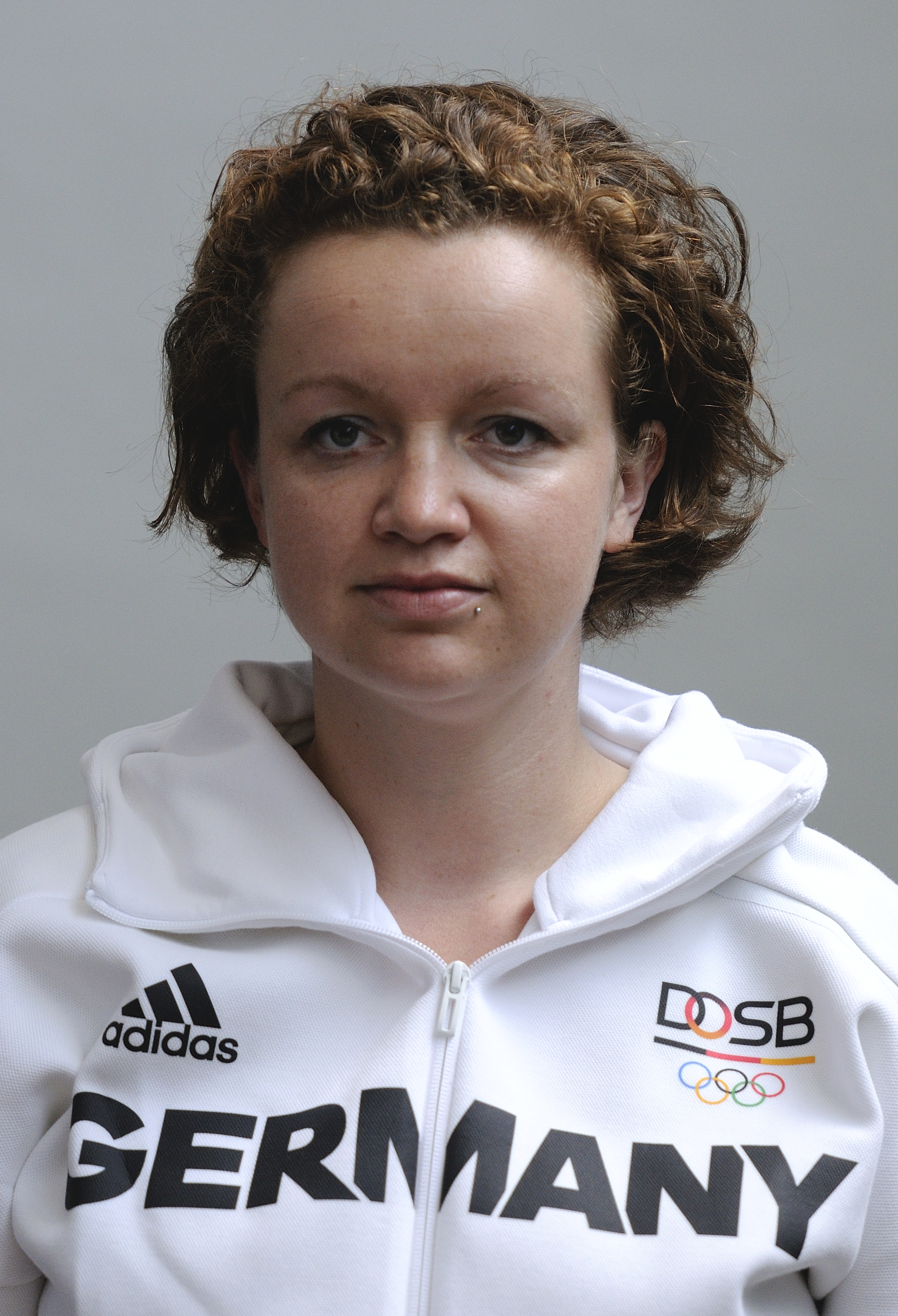
- Rösken in 2016

Personal information
- Nationality: German
- Born: 5 July 1984 (age 41) Eberbach, West Germany
- Height: 1.65 m (5 ft 5 in)
- Weight: 62 kg (137 lb)

Sport
- Country: Germany
- Sport: Shooting
- Event: Air rifle
- Club: SV Schlossau
Medal record
World Championships
Gold medal – first place	2018 Changwon	300 m team rifle prone
Gold medal – first place	2018 Changwon	300 m team rifle 3 positions
Silver medal – second place	2018 Changwon	300 m rifle prone

Eva Rösken (also spelled Roesken, born 5 July 1984) is a German sports shooter. She competed in the women's 50 metre rifle three positions event at the 2016 Summer Olympics.
