= Jeanette Hegg Duestad =

Norwegian sport shooter (born 1999)

Jeanette Duestad
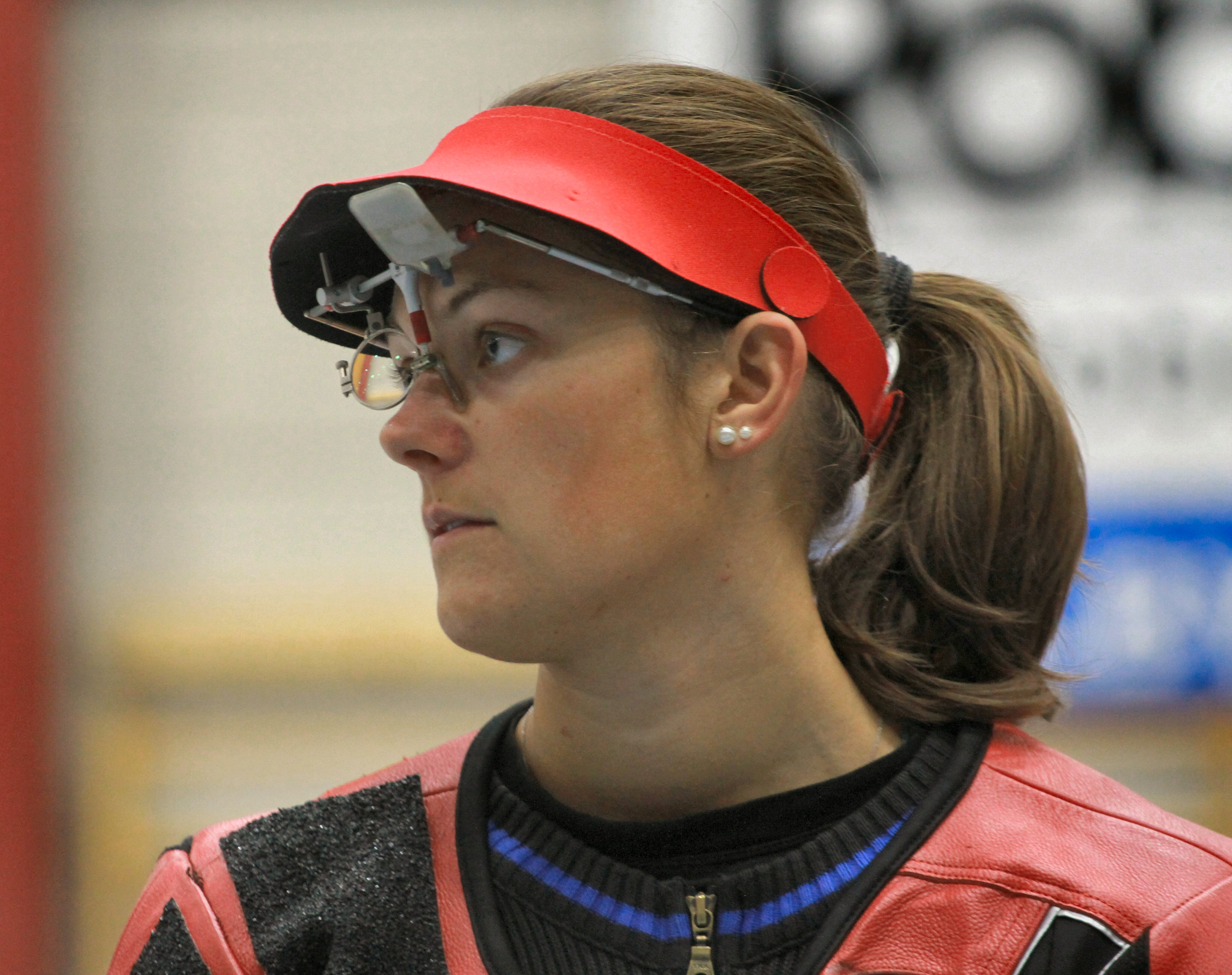
- Duestad in 2023

Personal information
- Full name: Jeanette Hegg Duestad
- Born: 11 January 1999 (age 27) Tønsberg, Norway

Sport
- Sport: Shooting
- Club: Nøtterø
Medal record
Women's shooting
Representing Norway
World Championships
Gold medal – first place	2022 Cairo	300 m rifle 3 positions
Gold medal – first place	2022 Cairo	300 m rifle prone team
Gold medal – first place	2022 Cairo	300 m rifle 3 positions team
Gold medal – first place	2022 Cairo	300 m rifle prone mixed team
Gold medal – first place	2023 Baku	300 m rifle 3 positions team
Gold medal – first place	2025 Cairo	50 m rifle 3 positions
Gold medal – first place	2026 Doha	50 m rifle 3 positions team
Silver medal – second place	2023 Baku	50 m rifle prone team
Silver medal – second place	2023 Baku	300 m rifle prone team
Silver medal – second place	2025 Cairo	300 m rifle 3 positions
Silver medal – second place	2026 Doha	50 m rifle prone team
Bronze medal – third place	2022 Cairo	50 m rifle 3 positions
Bronze medal – third place	2023 Baku	50 m rifle 3 positions team
Bronze medal – third place	2025 Cairo	50 m rifle prone team
European Games
Gold medal – first place	2023 Kraków–Małopolska	50 m rifle 3 positions team
Silver medal – second place	2023 Kraków–Małopolska	10 m air rifle team
European Championships
Gold medal – first place	2019 Bologna	50 m rifle 3 positions team
Gold medal – first place	2019 Bologna	50 m rifle prone mixed team
Gold medal – first place	2022 Wrocław	50 m rifle 3 positions mixed team
Gold medal – first place	2023 Tallinn	10 m air rifle
Gold medal – first place	2023 Tallinn	10 m air rifle team
Gold medal – first place	2023 Tallinn	10 m air rifle mixed team
Gold medal – first place	2025 Osijek	10 m air rifle team
Gold medal – first place	2025 Osijek	10 m air rifle trio
Gold medal – first place	2025 Osijek	10 m air rifle solo
Gold medal – first place	2025 Châteauroux	300 m Rifle 3 Positions
Gold medal – first place	2025 Châteauroux	300 m Rifle 3 Positions Team
Gold medal – first place	2026 Yerevan	10 m air rifle team
Gold medal – first place	2026 Yerevan	10 m air rifle team mixed
Silver medal – second place	2019 Bologna	50m rifle prone team
Silver medal – second place	2020 Wrocław	10 m rifle team
Silver medal – second place	2021 Osijek	50 m rifle 3 positions team
Silver medal – second place	2022 Hamar	10 m rifle team
Silver medal – second place	2025 Châteauroux	50 m Rifle 3 Positions
Silver medal – second place	2026 Osijek	50 m Rifle 3 Positions
Silver medal – second place	2026 Osijek	50 m Rifle prone
Bronze medal – third place	2021 Osijek	50 m rifle 3 positions
Bronze medal – third place	2022 Wrocław	50 m rifle prone
Bronze medal – third place	2022 Wrocław	50 m rifle 3 positions team
Bronze medal – third place	2025 Osijek	10 m air rifle mixed team

Jeanette Hegg Duestad (born 11 January 1999) is a Norwegian sport shooter. Her achievements include winning individual gold medal in rifle shooting at both the 2022 and 2025 ISSF World Shooting Championships, as well as team gold medals in 2022 and 2023.

== Biography ==
Duestad was born in Tønsberg on 11 January 1999.

=== 2021 ===
At the 2021 European Shooting Championships she won an individual bronze medal in 50 m rifle 3 positions. Further, she won a silver medal in 50 m rifle 3 positions team, along with Katrine Lund and Jenny Stene.

She represented Norway at the 2020 Summer Olympics in Tokyo 2021, where she placed fourth in women's 10 metre air rifle.

=== 2022 ===
At the 2022 European 25/50 m Events Championships, she won a gold medal in 50m rifle 3 positions mixed team, together with Jon-Hermann Hegg.

She won an individual gold medal in 300 m rifle 3 positions at the 2022 ISSF World Shooting Championships, ahead of Sarina Hitz and Elin Ahlin. She placed fourth in 300 m rifle prone, missing the bronze by a narrow margin. She won a gold medal in 300 m rifle 3 positions team, with team mates Katrine Lund and Jenny Vatne, defeating the Swiss team in the final. With the same team, she also won gold medal in 300 m rifle prone team. She won a bronze medal in 50 m rifle 3 positions, behind winner Miao Wanru and silver medalist Jenny Stene. On the final day of the championships she won her fourth gold medal, in 300 m rifle prone mixed team, together with Simon Claussen.

=== 2023 ===
At the 2023 European 10 m Events Championships in Tallinn, her gold medal in 10 m air rifle was Norway's first in 10 meter since Anne Grethe Jeppesen's victory in 1981. She also won the gold medal in 10 m air rifle team, with Jenny Stene and Katrine Lund, in addition to winning the 10 m air rifle mixed team, teamed with Jon-Hermann Hegg.

She was part of the Norwegian winning team in 50 m rifle (team match) at the 2023 European Games, along with Mari Bårdseng Løvseth and Jenny Stene. She also competed in 50 m rifle (match) at the games, placing fifth. At the same European Games she also won a silver medal in 10 m air rifle team, along with Milda Marina Haugen and Jenny Stene, after being defeated by Switzerland in the gold medal match.

At the 2023 ISSF World Shooting Championships in Baku, she won a silver medal in 50 m rifle prone team, along with Mari Bårdseng Løvseth and Jenny Stene, closely behind the Swiss winning team. She also won a silver medal in 300 m rifle prone team, along with Katrine Lund and Jenny Vatne. She won a bronze medal in 50 m rifle 3 positions team, along with Jenny Stene and Mari Bårdseng Løvseth. In the very last competition at the 2023 championships she won a gold medal in 300 m rifle 3 positions team, along with Katrine Lund and Jenny Vatne.

Competing in the 2023 ISSF World Cup, she placed third in 10 meter air rifle at the world cup final in Doha in November.

=== 2024 ===
In May 2024 Duestad placed fourth in 50 metre rifle match at the 2024 European Championships 25m & 50m events in Osijek, and won a team silver medal with the Norwegian team (behind Switzerland), with team mates Jenny Stene and Mari Bårdseng Løvseth.

She was selected to represent Norway at the 2024 Summer Olympics in Paris. Her first competition in the Olympics was in mixed air rifle team with Jon-Hermann Hegg, where they placed fifth, missing the final by a hair (0.1 points). She qualified for the final in Women's 50 metre rifle three positions, and placed fourth in the final.

=== 2025 ===
In March 2025 at the European 10 m Events Championships in Osijek, Duestad became European champion in the 10m air rifle event, defeating Damla Kose in the final. Duestad also won a team bronze medal in 10m air rifle mixed pairs with Jon-Hermann Hegg. She won a gold medal in team air rifle, along with Mari Bårdseng Løvseth and Amalie Evensen, setting a new European Record of 1896.9.

She won a silver medal in 50m rifle 3 positions at the 2025 European Shooting Championships. In the 300m rifle 3 positions she won an individual gold medal, as well as the team gold medal for Norway, jointly with Jenny Vatne and Oda Flikkerud.

She won a gold medal in 50 metre rifle three positions at the 2025 ISSF World Shooting Championships in Cairo. Defeating Emely Jaeggi of Switzerland by 0.5 points, this was Duestad's first world title in the event. She won a silver medal in 300 metre rifle three positions at the Cairo world championsips, one point behind gold winner Katrine Lund.

On the 2025 ISSF World Cup circuit, Duestad won four individual medals and three team medals. At the World Cup Final in Doha, she won the 50m Rifle 3 Positions, guaranteeing a spot at the 2026 World Cup Finals as the title defender.

=== 2026 ===
On the ISSF World Cup circuit, Duestad won five medals, including a Gold in the Women's 50M 3-Position Rifle at Munich.
