= Mari Bårdseng Løvseth =

Norwegian sport shooter (born 2000)

Personal information
- Nationality: Norwegian
- Born: 3 June 2000 (age 26)

Sport
- Sport: Shooting
Medal record
World Championships
Silver medal – second place	2023 Baku	50 m rifle prone team
Bronze medal – third place	2023 Baku	50 m rifle 3 positions team
Bronze medal – third place	2025 Cairo	50 m rifle prone team
European Games
Gold medal – first place	2023 Kraków–Małopolska	50 m rifle 3 positions team
European Championships
Bronze medal – third place	2022 Wrocław	50 m rifle 3 positions team
Silver medal – second place	2024 Osijek	50 m rifle 3 positions team
Silver medal – second place	2024 Osijek	50 m rifle 3 positions trio
Silver medal – second place	2024 Osijek	50 m rifle prone team
Silver medal – second place	2024 Osijek	50 m rifle 3 position mixed duet
Gold medal – first place	2025 Osijek	10 m air rifle team
Gold medal – first place	2025 Osijek	10 m air rifle team

Mari Bårdseng Løvseth (born 3 June 2000) is a Norwegian sport shooter. Her achievements include winning a team gold medal at the 2023 European Games. She was also part of the Norwegian teams who won a gold medal at the 2022 ISSF World Cup in Baku, and a bronze medal at the 2022 European 25/50 m Events Championships in Wrocław.

At the 2023 ISSF World Shooting Championships in Baku, she won a silver medal in 50 m rifle prone team, along with Jenny Stene and Jeanette Hegg Duestad, closely behind the Swiss winning team.

In May 2024 she won four team silver medals for Norway in 50 metre prone and 3-position events at the European Championships in Osijek, along with teammates Jeanette Hegg Duestad, Jenny Stene and Henrik Larsen.

In March 2025 at the European 10 m Events Championships in Osijek, Løvseth won a gold medal in team air rifle, along with Amalie Evensen and Jeanette Hegg Duestad, setting a new European Record of 1896.9.
