= Veronika Major =

Hungarian sports shooter (born 1997)

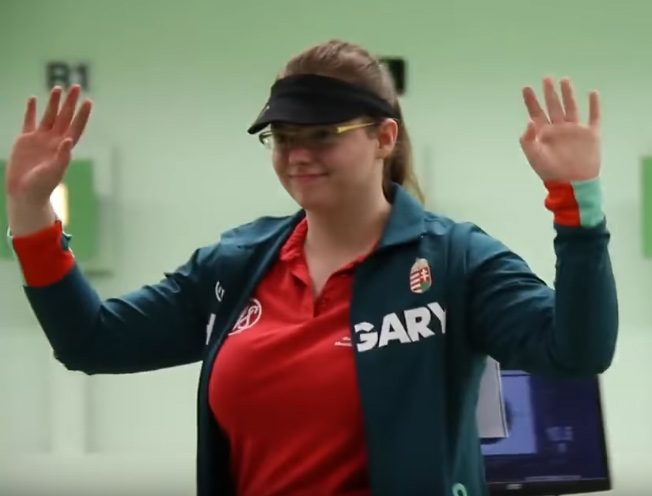
- Major in 2018 FISU World Shooting Sport Championship

Personal information
- Born: 19 March 1997 (age 29) Keszthely, Hungary

Sport
- Sport: Sport shooting
- Events: 10m Air Pistol; 25m Pistol; 10m Running Target

Achievements and titles
- Olympic finals: 2020 Summer Olympics; 2024 Summer Olympics
Medal record
Representing Hungary
Pistol shooting
Olympic Games
Bronze medal – third place	2024 Paris	25 m pistol
World Championships
Silver medal – second place	2023 Baku	10 m air pistol team
Silver medal – second place	2025 Cairo	25 m standard pistol team
Silver medal – second place	2026 Doha	25 m standard pistol
Bronze medal – third place	2025 Cairo	25 m standard pistol
Bronze medal – third place	2026 Doha	10 m air pistol
Bronze medal – third place	2026 Doha	25 m standard pistol team
European Shooting Championships
Gold medal – first place	2024 Győr	10 m air pistol team
Gold medal – first place	2026 Yerevan	10 m air pistol
Gold medal – first place	2026 Yerevan	10 m air pistol team
Gold medal – first place	2026 Yerevan	10 m air pistol team mixed
Silver medal – second place	2019 Bologna	25 m pistol
Silver medal – second place	2025 Châteauroux	25 m standard pistol
Bronze medal – third place	2019 Osijek	10 m air pistol
Bronze medal – third place	2021 Osijek	25 m pistol team
Bronze medal – third place	2025 Châteauroux	25 m pistol team
ISSF World Cup
Gold medal – first place	2019 Rio de Janeiro	25 m pistol
Gold medal – first place	2019 New Delhi	25 m pistol
Gold medal – first place	2019 New Delhi	10 m air pistol
Silver medal – second place	2019 Beijing	25 m pistol
Bronze medal – third place	2019 Beijing	10 m air pistol
Silver medal – second place	2022 Baku	25 m pistol
Silver medal – second place	2022 Cairo	25 m pistol
Bronze medal – third place	2022 Changwon	10 m air pistol
Gold medal – first place	2023 Rio de Janeiro	25 m pistol
Gold medal – first place	2023 Cairo	25 m pistol
Gold medal – first place	2023 Cairo	10 m air pistol
Bronze medal – third place	2025 Ningbo	Mixed team

Veronika Major (born 19 March 1997) is a Hungarian sports shooter. She competed in the women's 10 metre air pistol event at the 2020 Summer Olympics, and won bronze medal in the women's 25 metre pistol event at the 2024 Summer Olympics.

== Career ==
As a Junior, Major was successful in Running Target Air Rifle shooting, winning medals at three world championships and becoming Junior Women's World Champion in 2014 and 2016.

In 2019 she became European Champion in 50m Running Target mixed.

As Running Target is not an Olympic discipline, she switched to Olympic pistol events as a senior, winning gold medals in both 10m Air Pistol and 25m Sport Pistol during the 2019 ISSF World Cup series.

In 2022 she again performed strongly, winning silver medals in 25m Sport Pistol at the 2022 ISSF World Cup matches in Baku and Cairo.

This run of performance continued into 2023 with three gold medals in Rio de Janeiro and Cairo for both 25m pistol and 10m air pistol.

In September 2023, Major won the Hungarian national championship in 25 metre pistol.
