= Stephanie Grundsøe =

Danish sport shooter (born 2000)

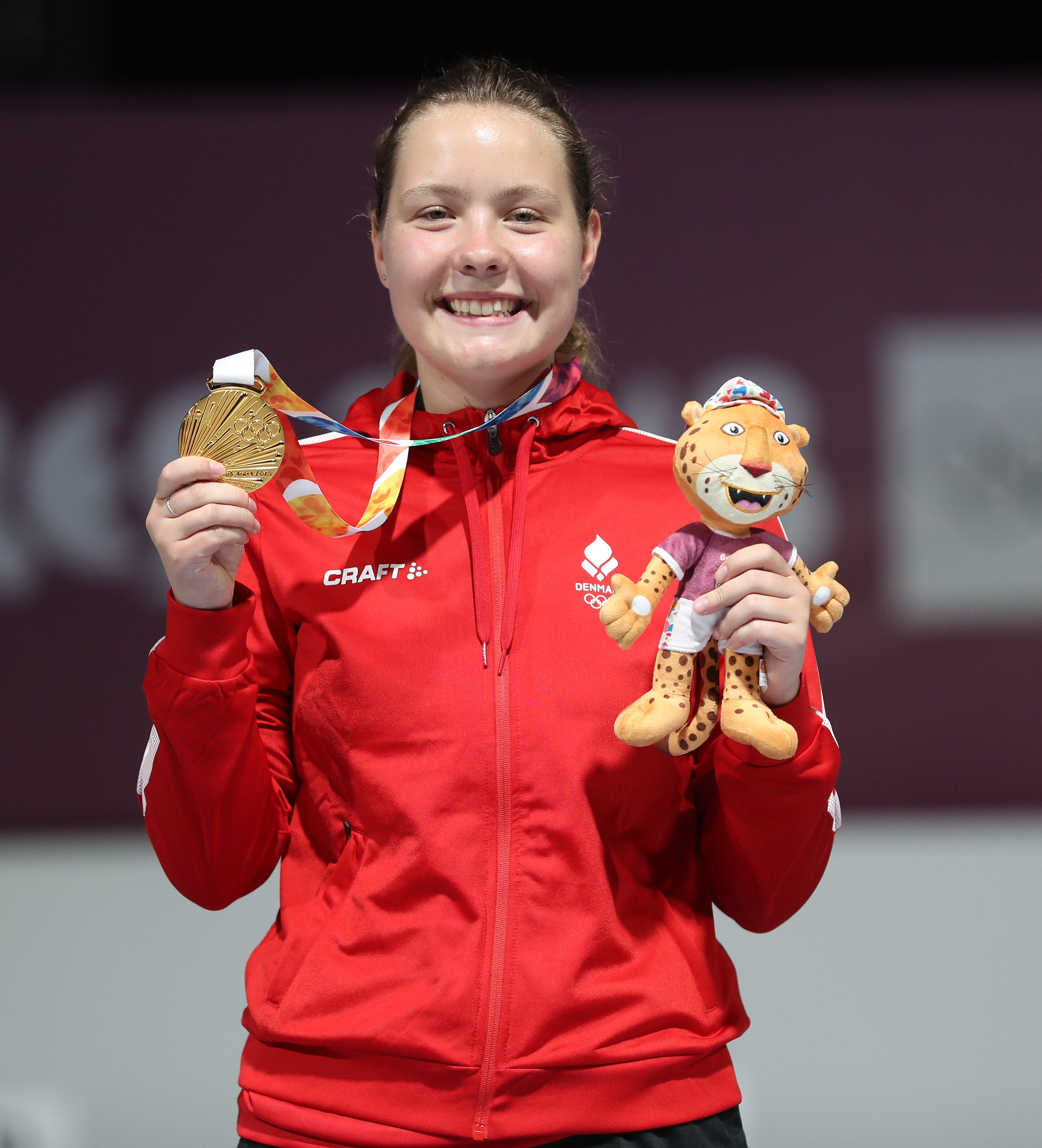

Personal information
- Full name: Stephanie Laura Scurrah Grundsøe
- Nationality: Danish
- Born: 27 January 2000 (age 26)

Sport
- Country: Denmark
- Sport: Shooting
- Event: Air rifle
Medal record
World Championships
Silver medal – second place	2018 Changwon	50 m rifle prone team
Silver medal – second place	2018 Changwon	50 m rifle 3 positions team
Silver medal – second place	2026 Doha	50 m rifle prone
Bronze medal – third place	2026 Doha	50 m rifle prone team
European Championships
Bronze medal – third place	2022 Wrocław	50m rifle 3 positions mixed team

Stephanie Laura Scurrah Grundsøe (born 27 January 2000) is a Danish sport shooter.

She participated at the 2018 ISSF World Shooting Championships, winning a medal. She won the gold medal at the girls' 10 metre air rifle at the 2018 Summer Youth Olympics.

From 2016 to 2019 Grundsøe studied at the Norwegian College of Elite Sports in Kongsvinger, Norway.
