= Linda Olofsson (sport shooter) =

Swedish sport shooter

Personal information
- Born: 4 December 1982 (age 43)

Sport
- Country: Sweden
- Sport: Shooting
- Events: 10 metre air rifle; 50 metre rifle three positions; 50 metre rifle prone; 300 metre rifle prone
- Coached by: Mats Eriksson
Medal record
Women's shooting
Representing Sweden
World Military Shooting Championship
| Gold medal – first place | 2008 Rio de Janeiro | 50m Rifle Prone |
| Gold medal – first place | 2008 Boden | 50m Rifle 3 Position |
| Silver medal – second place | 2008 Boden | 300m Rifle Prone |
European Championships
| Bronze medal – third place | 2019 Bologna | 300m Rifle Prone |
| Bronze medal – third place | 2019 Bologna | 300m Rifle Prone Team |

Linda Olofsson (born 4 December 1982) is a Swedish sports shooter who won two medals at the 2019 European Shooting Championships. She has won two World Championship titles at the CISM World Military Shooting Championships.

== Career ==
As a member of the Swedish Armed Forces, Olofsson started her international career representing Sweden at the CISM World Military Shooting Championships. At the 2008 Championships in Boden, Sweden, Olofsson won a gold medal in the women's 50metre rifle 3-position event. She won a silver medal in the women's rifle team.

At the 2010 World Military Shooting Championships in Rio de Janeiro, Olofsson won the 50m prone rifle with a new Military World Record of 598/600. This exceeded the ISSF World Record but was not admissible as it was set at a competition with restricted entry (military personnel only).

She has represented Sweden at the ISSF World Championships in 2010, 2014 and 2018, with a top finish of 16th.

At the 2019 European Shooting Championships she won bronze medals in the 300m prone rifle individual and team events.
