= Kim-André Lund =

Norwegian sport shooter (born 1990)

Personal information
- Nationality: Norwegian
- Born: 11 September 1990 (age 35)
- Height: 1.83 m (6 ft 0 in)
- Weight: 73 kg (161 lb)

Sport
- Country: Norway
- Sport: Shooting
- Event: Air rifle
- Club: Numedal Sportskytterlag
Medal record
World Championships
Gold medal – first place	2018 Changwon	300 m standard rifle team
Gold medal – first place	2023 Baku	300 m rifle prone team
Silver medal – second place	2023 Baku	300 m standard rifle open
Bronze medal – third place	2023 Baku	300 m rifle 3 positions team

Kim-André Lund (born 11 September 1990) is a Norwegian sport shooter.

He participated at the 2018 ISSF World Shooting Championships, winning a medal.

At the 2023 ISSF World Shooting Championships in Baku, he won a gold medal in 300 m rifle prone team, along with Odd Arne Brekne and Simon Claussen.

His sister Katrine Lund is also a sport shooter and she too has won laurels for Norway in international competitions.
