= Jon-Hermann Hegg =

Norwegian sport shooter (born 1999)

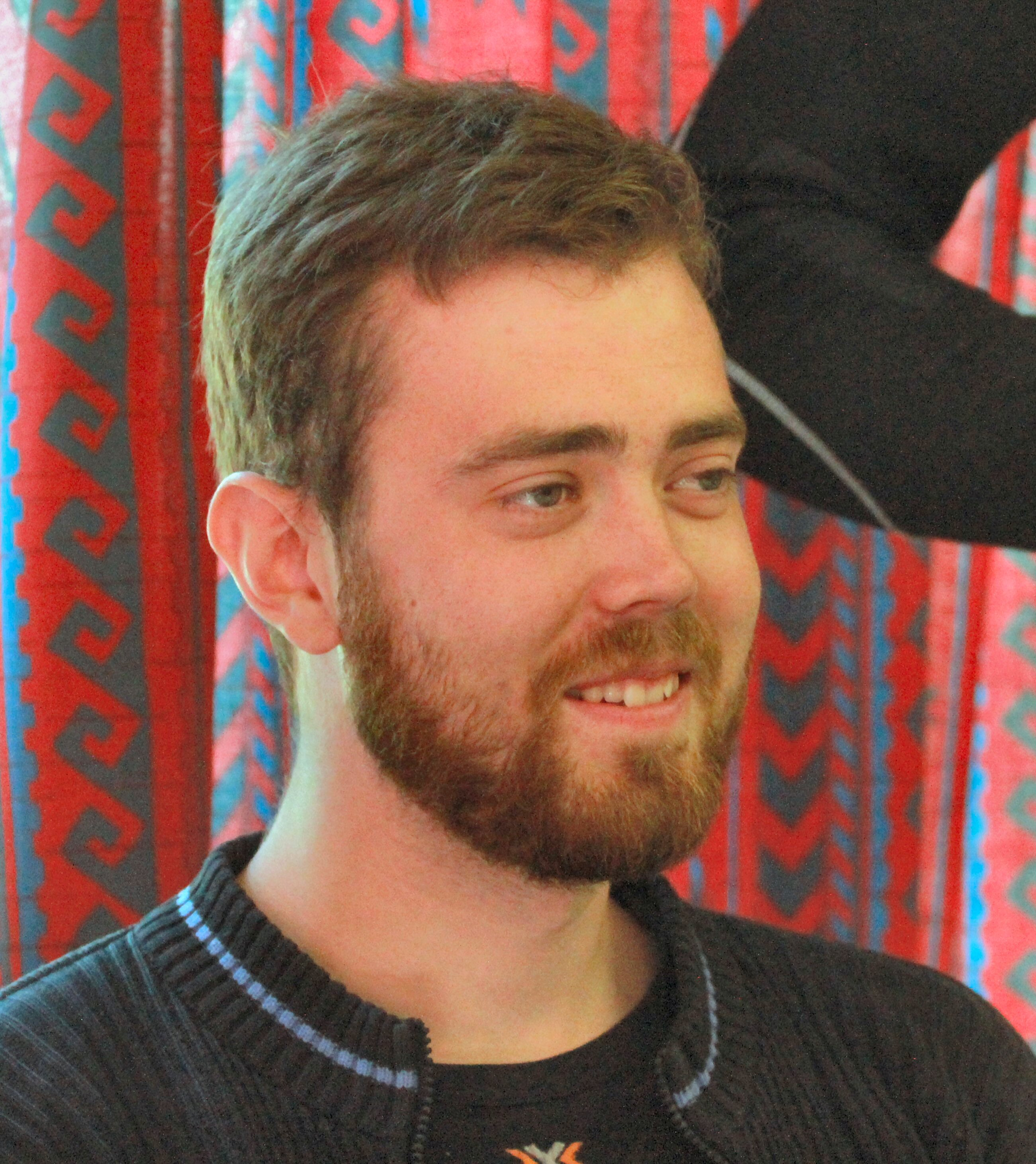
- Hegg in 2023

Personal information
- Nationality: Norwegian
- Born: 26 March 1999 (age 27) Dingle, Ireland
- Height: 195 cm (6 ft 5 in)

Sport
- Sport: Shooting
- Club: Kisen
Medal record
Men's shooting
Representing Norway
World Championships
Gold medal – first place	2022 Cairo	50 m rifle 3 positions team
Gold medal – first place	2023 Baku	50 m rifle prone team
Silver medal – second place	2025 Cairo	50 m rifle 3 positions team
Silver medal – second place	2026 Doha	50 m rifle 3 positions team
Bronze medal – third place	2022 Cairo	50 m rifle 3 positions
Bronze medal – third place	2023 Baku	50 m rifle 3 positions team
Bronze medal – third place	2025 Cairo	50 m rifle prone team
Bronze medal – third place	2026 Doha	10 m air rifle team
World Cup Final
Bronze medal – third place	2023 Doha	50 m rifle 3 positions
World Cup
Gold medal – first place	2022 Cairo	10 m air rifle mixed team
Gold medal – first place	2022 Cairo	50 m rifle 3 positions mixed team
Gold medal – first place	2022 Rio De Janeiro	50 m rifle 3 positions mixed team
Silver medal – second place	2023 Rio De Janeiro	50 m rifle 3 positions
Silver medal – second place	2022 Rio De Janeiro	10 m air rifle mixed team
Silver medal – second place	2024 Munich	10m Air Rifle Mixed Team
Silver medal – second place	2022 Rio De Janeiro	50 m rifle 3 positions mixed team
Bronze medal – third place	2022 Rio De Janeiro	50 m rifle 3 positions
Bronze medal – third place	2023 Rio De Janeiro	10 m air rifle
Bronze medal – third place	2024 Munich	50 m rifle 3 positions
Bronze medal – third place	2022 Rio De Janeiro	10 m air rifle team
Bronze medal – third place	2022 Cairo	50 m rifle 3 positions team
European Championships
Gold medal – first place	2019 Bologna	50 m rifle 3 positions team
Gold medal – first place	2021 Osijek	50 m rifle 3 positions
Gold medal – first place	2022 Wrocław	50m rifle 3 positions mixed team
Gold medal – first place	2023 Tallinn	10 m air rifle mixed team
Gold medal – first place	2025 Croatia	10 m air rifle team
Gold medal – first place	2025 Châteauroux	50 m Rifle 3 Positions Team
Gold medal – first place	2025 Châteauroux	50 m Rifle Prone
Gold medal – first place	2025 Châteauroux	50 m Rifle Prone Team
Gold medal – first place	2026 Yerevan	10 m air rifle team
Gold medal – first place	2026 Yerevan	10 m air rifle team mixed
Silver medal – second place	2021 Osijek	50 m rifle 3 positions team
Silver medal – second place	2022 Wrocław	50 m rifle 3 positions
Silver medal – second place	2022 Wrocław	50 m rifle 3 positions team
Silver medal – second place	2026 Osijek	50 m Rifle 3 Positions
Bronze medal – third place	2019 Bologna	50 m rifle 3 positions
Bronze medal – third place	2025 Osijek	10 m air rifle mixed team

Jon-Hermann Hegg (born 26 March 1999) is a Norwegian sport shooter. His achievements include winning individual gold medal at the European Championships and individual bronze at the World Championships, as well as team gold medals both in World and European championships. He holds a team world record in 50 metre rifle three positions since 2021.

== Biography ==
Hegg was born in Dingle, Ireland, on 26 March 1999.

=== 2021 ===
Competing at the 2021 European Shooting Championships in Croatia, Hegg won a gold medal in 50 m rifle 3 positions, ahead of silver medalist Henrik Larsen. Together with Simon Claussen, who placed 7th in the final, these three set a new world record for teams in the qualifications with a total of 3549 points, all three qualifying for the final. He won a silver medal in 50 m rifle 3 positions team, along with Simon Claussen and Henrik Larsen.

He represented Norway at the 2020 Summer Olympics in Tokyo 2021, competing in men's 10 m air rifle and in 50 metre rifle three positions.

=== 2022 ===
With a height of 196 cm and a longer neck than average, the rule change regarding the size of certain weapon details, effective from 1 January 2022, made the shooting process more comfortable for Hegg, who previously suffered from balance problems and neck pain due to unnatural headbending during shooting.

At the 2022 European 25/50 m Events Championships, he won a gold medal in 50m rifle 3 positions mixed team, together with Jeanette Hegg Duestad.

At the 2022 ISSF World Shooting Championships in Cairo he won a gold medal in 50 m rifle 3 positions team, along with Simon Claussen and Henrik Larsen, after defeating a French team in the final match.

=== 2023 ===
At the 2023 European 10 m Events Championships in Tallinn, together with Jeanette Hegg Duestad he won the 10 m air rifle mixed team, defeating a team from Israel in the final.

Competing at the 2023 ISSF World Shooting Championships in Baku, he won the team gold medal in 50 m rifle prone, along with Ole Martin Halvorsen and Henrik Larsen. He won a bronze medal in 50 m rifle 3 positions team, along with Ole Martin Halvorsen and Henrik Larsen.

=== 2024 ===
In May 2024 Hegg won a gold medal in 50 metre rifle match at the 2024 European Championships 25m & 50m events in Osijek, ahead of Serhiy Kulish and Patrik Jány. He also won the team gold medal in 50m rifle match with the Norwegian team, along with Henrik Larsen and Ole Martin Halvorsen.

He was selected to represent Norway at the 2024 Summer Olympics in Paris. His first competition in the Olympics was in mixed air rifle team with Jeanette Hegg Duestad, where they placed fifth, missing the final by a hair (0.1 points).

=== 2025 ===
In March 2025 Hegg won a team gold medal in 10m air rifle at the 2025 European 10 m Events Championships in Osijek, along with Henrik Larsen and Ole Martin Halvorsen. He also won a team bronze medal in 10m air rifle mix, together with Jeanette Hegg Duestad.

== Records ==
Current world records held in 50 metre rifle three positions
Men's	Teams	3549	Norway (Claussen, Larsen, Hegg)	May 29, 2021	Osijek (CRO)
