= Silvia Guignard =

Swiss sport shooter (born 1974)

Personal information
- Full name: Silvia Guignard Schnyder
- Nationality: Swiss
- Born: 6 August 1974 (age 51) Lachen, Switzerland
- Height: 1.62 m (5 ft 4 in)
- Weight: 61 kg (134 lb)

Sport
- Country: Switzerland
- Sport: Shooting
- Events: 10m Air Rifle; 300m Rifle Prone; 300m Rifle Three Position
- Club: Stadtschuetzengesellschaft Zürich
Medal record
World Championships
| Gold medal – first place | 2023 Baku | 300 m rifle prone team |
| Silver medal – second place | 2022 Cairo | 300 m rifle prone |
| Silver medal – second place | 2022 Cairo | 300 m rifle prone team |
| Silver medal – second place | 2022 Cairo | 300 m rifle 3 positions team |
| Silver medal – second place | 2023 Baku | 300 m rifle prone |
| Silver medal – second place | 2023 Baku | 300 m rifle 3 positions team |
| Bronze medal – third place | 2018 Changwon | 300 m rifle prone |
| Bronze medal – third place | 2018 Changwon | 300 m rifle prone team |
| Bronze medal – third place | 2018 Changwon | 300 m rifle 3 positions team |
| Bronze medal – third place | 2023 Baku | 300 m rifle 3 positions |

Silvia Guignard Schnyder (born 6 August 1974) is a Swiss sport shooter.

She has participated at three ISSF World Shooting Championships, winning ten medals.

She won a bronze medal in the 300 m rifle three positions event at the 2023 Lapua European Cup.
