= Simon Claussen =

Norwegian sport shooter (born 1991)

Simon Kolstad Claussen
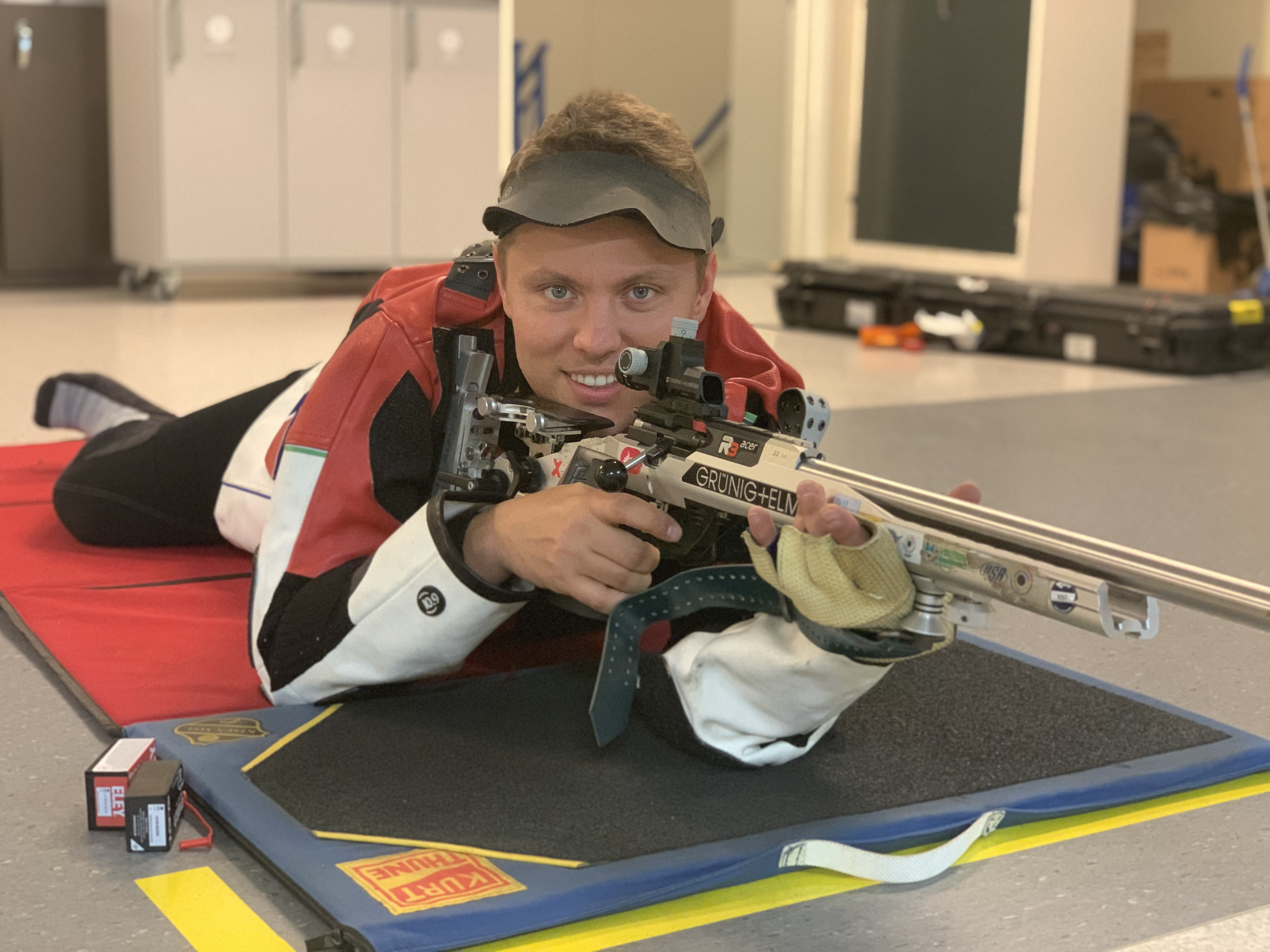

Personal information
- Nationality: Norwegian
- Born: 21 June 1991 (age 35) Setskog, Norway

Sport
- Sport: Shooting
- Club: Høland/Bjørkelangen; Kisen
Medal record
World Championships
Gold medal – first place	2022 Cairo	300 m rifle prone
Gold medal – first place	2022 Cairo	50 m rifle 3 positions team
Gold medal – first place	2022 Cairo	50 m rifle 3 positions mixed team
Gold medal – first place	2023 Baku	300 m rifle prone team
Silver medal – second place	2022 Cairo	300 m standard rifle open
Bronze medal – third place	2023 Baku	300 m rifle 3 positions team
European Games
Bronze medal – third place	2023 Kraków–Małopolska	50 m rifle 3 positions mixed team
European Championships
Silver medal – second place	2021 Osijek	50 m rifle 3 positions team
Bronze medal – third place	2021 Osijek	50 m rifle 3 positions mixed team

Simon Kolstad Claussen (born 21 June 1991) is a Norwegian sport shooter. His achievements include winning both individual and team medals in rifle shooting at the 2022 world championships. He co-holds a team world record in 50 metre rifle three positions since 2021.

== Biography ==
Born in Setskog on 21 June 1991, Claussen represents the clubs Høland/Bjørkelangen skytterlag and Kisen MSL. He has won several national titles in rifle shooting, and represented Norway internationally.

=== 2021 ===
Competing at the 2021 European Shooting Championships in Croatia, Claussen won a silver medal in 50 m rifle 3 positions team, along with Jon-Hermann Hegg and Henrik Larsen. He won a bronze medal in 50 m rifle 3 positions mixed team, along with Jenny Stene. He also competed in 50 m rifle 3 positions, placing seventh. Together with Jon-Hermann Hegg and Henrik Larsen, who won individual gold and silver medals, respectively, he set a new world record for teams in the qualifications with a total of 3549 points.

=== 2022 ===
He won a silver medal in 300 m rifle at the 2022 ISSF World Shooting Championships. He won a gold medal in 50 m rifle 3 positions team, along with Larsen and Hegg, after defeating a French team in the final match. Further, he won a gold medal in 300 m rifle prone mixed team, along with Jeanette Hegg Duestad, as well as gold medal in 50 m rifle 3 positions mixed team, at the 2022 World Championships.

=== 2023 ===
In June 2023 Claussen competed at the 2023 European Games, where he won a bronze medal in mixed team, along with Jenny Stene. Along with Ole Martin Halvorsen and Jon-Hermann Hegg, he qualified for the finals in 50 metre rifle team, where they placed fourth, defeated by Serbia in the bronze medal match.

At the 2023 ISSF World Shooting Championships in Baku, he won a gold medal in 300 m rifle prone team, along with Kim-André Lund and Odd Arne Brekne. He placed fourth in the individual contest.
