= Sofia Ceccarello =

Italian sports shooter (born 2002)

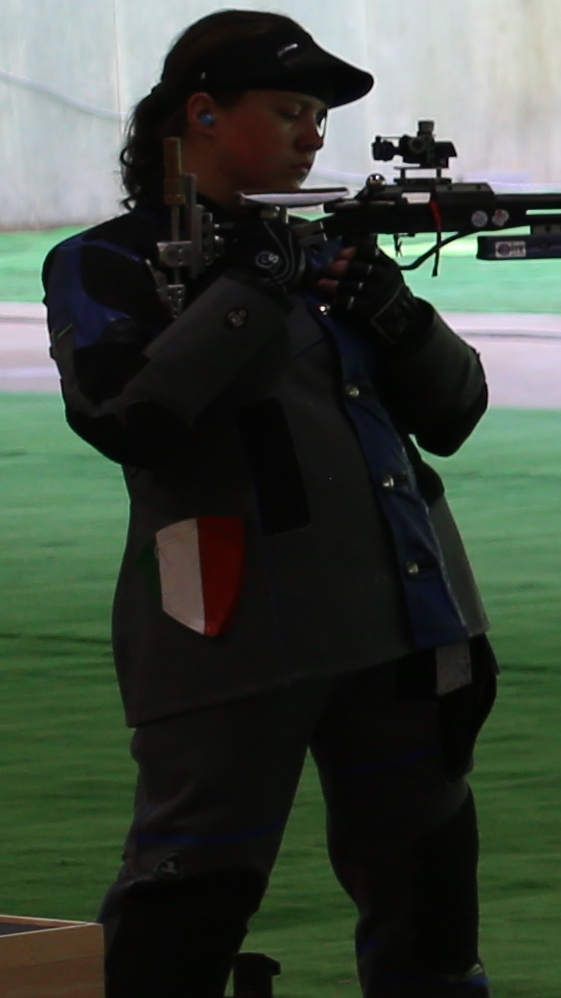
- Sofia Ceccarello at the 2020 Summer Olympics

Personal information
- Nationality: Italian
- Born: 2 December 2002 (age 23) Lugo, Italy

Sport
- Sport: Sports shooting
Medal record
Representing Italy
European Games
| Bronze medal – third place | 2023 Kraków-Małopolska | 10 m air rifle mixed team |

Sofia Ceccarello (born 2 December 2002) is an Italian sports shooter. She competed in the women's 10 metre air rifle event at the 2020 Summer Olympics.
