= 2022 ISSF World Cup =

Shooting competition

- Sport: Shooting
- Hosts: (Egypt) Cairo (Cyprus) Nicosia (Peru) Lima (Brazil) Rio De Janeiro (Italy) Lonato (Azerbaijan) Baku (South Korea) Changwon
- Duration: 26 February – TBA

Seasons
- ← 2021 2023 →

The 2022 ISSF World Cup is the annual edition of the ISSF World Cup in the Olympic shooting events, governed by the International Shooting Sport Federation.

== Calendar ==
The calendar for the 2022 World Cup include 7 stages.

Leg	Dates	Location	Type
1	26 February – 8 March	(Egypt) Cairo	Rifle/Pistol
2	8 – 19 March	(Cyprus) Nicosia	Shotgun
3	27 March – 7 April	(Peru) Lima	Shotgun
4	9 – 19 April	(Brazil) Rio de Janeiro	Rifle/Pistol
5	19 – 30 April	(Italy) Lonato del Garda	Shotgun
6	27 May – 7 June	(Azerbaijan) Baku	Rifle/Pistol/Shotgun
7	9 – 22 July	(South Korea) Changwon	Rifle/Pistol/Shotgun

== Men's results ==
=== Rifle events ===
50 metre rifle three positions		10 metre air rifle	
(Egypt) Cairo		(Egypt) Cairo	
1st place, gold medalist(s)	Patrik Jány (SVK)	1st place, gold medalist(s)	Danilo Sollazzo (ITA)
2nd place, silver medalist(s)	Zalán Pekler (HUN)	2nd place, silver medalist(s)	Patrik Jány (SVK)
3rd place, bronze medalist(s)	Petar Gorša (CRO)	3rd place, bronze medalist(s)	Jiří Přívratský (CZE)
(Brazil) Rio de Janeiro		(Brazil) Rio de Janeiro	
1st place, gold medalist(s)	Jiří Přívratský (CZE)	1st place, gold medalist(s)	Petar Gorša (CRO)
2nd place, silver medalist(s)	Simon Claussen (NOR)	2nd place, silver medalist(s)	Sergey Richter (ISR)
3rd place, bronze medalist(s)	Jon-Hermann Hegg (NOR)	3rd place, bronze medalist(s)	Miran Maričić (CRO)
(Azerbaijan) Baku		(Azerbaijan) Baku	
1st place, gold medalist(s)	Serhiy Kulish (UKR)	1st place, gold medalist(s)	Lazar Kovačević (SRB)
2nd place, silver medalist(s)	Swapnil Kusale (IND)	2nd place, silver medalist(s)	Miran Maričić (CRO)
3rd place, bronze medalist(s)	Aleksi Leppä (FIN)	3rd place, bronze medalist(s)	Islam Usseinov (KAZ)
(South Korea) Changwon		(South Korea) Changwon	
1st place, gold medalist(s)	Aishwary Pratap Singh Tomar (IND)	1st place, gold medalist(s)	Arjun Babuta (IND)
2nd place, silver medalist(s)	Zalán Pekler (HUN)	2nd place, silver medalist(s)	Lucas Kozeniesky (USA)
3rd place, bronze medalist(s)	István Péni (HUN)	3rd place, bronze medalist(s)	Sergy Rikhter (ISR)

=== Pistol events ===
25 metre rapid fire pistol		10 metre air pistol	
(Egypt) Cairo		(Egypt) Cairo	
1st place, gold medalist(s)	Jean Quiquampoix (FRA)	1st place, gold medalist(s)	Saurabh Chaudhary (IND)
2nd place, silver medalist(s)	Ruslan Lunev (AZE)	2nd place, silver medalist(s)	Michael Schwald (GER)
3rd place, bronze medalist(s)	Martin Strnad (CZE)	3rd place, bronze medalist(s)	Artem Chernousov
(Brazil) Rio de Janeiro		(Brazil) Rio de Janeiro	
1st place, gold medalist(s)	Christian Reitz (GER)	1st place, gold medalist(s)	Juraj Tužinský (SVK)
2nd place, silver medalist(s)	Jean Quiquampoix (FRA)	2nd place, silver medalist(s)	Robin Walter (GER)
3rd place, bronze medalist(s)	Henry Turner Leverett (USA)	3rd place, bronze medalist(s)	Christian Reitz (GER)
(Azerbaijan) Baku		(Azerbaijan) Baku	
1st place, gold medalist(s)	Jean Quiquampoix (FRA)	1st place, gold medalist(s)	Damir Mikec (SRB)
2nd place, silver medalist(s)	Christian Reitz (GER)	2nd place, silver medalist(s)	Kaloyan Stamenov (BUL)
3rd place, bronze medalist(s)	Clément Bessaguet (FRA)	3rd place, bronze medalist(s)	Michael Schwald (GER)
(South Korea) Changwon		(South Korea) Changwon	
1st place, gold medalist(s)	Dai Yoshioka (JPN)	1st place, gold medalist(s)	Damir Mikec (SRB)
2nd place, silver medalist(s)	Jean Quiquampoix (FRA)	2nd place, silver medalist(s)	Luca Tesconi (ITA)
3rd place, bronze medalist(s)	Lee Jae-kyoon (KOR)	3rd place, bronze medalist(s)	Paolo Monna (ITA)

=== Shotgun events ===
Trap			Skeet		
(Cyprus) Nicosia			(Cyprus) Nicosia		
1st place, gold medalist(s)	Oğuzhan Tüzün (TUR)	31	1st place, gold medalist(s)	Azmy Mehelba (EGY)	36
2nd place, silver medalist(s)	Giovanni Cernogoraz (CRO)	29	2nd place, silver medalist(s)	Tammaro Cassandro (ITA)	35
3rd place, bronze medalist(s)	Talal Al-Rashidi (KUW)	20	3rd place, bronze medalist(s)	Éric Delaunay (FRA)	23
(Peru) Lima			(Peru) Lima		
1st place, gold medalist(s)	Alberto Fernández (ESP)	30+2	1st place, gold medalist(s)	Nicolás Pacheco (PER)	37+4
2nd place, silver medalist(s)	Erminio Frasca (ITA)	30+1	2nd place, silver medalist(s)	Federico Gil (ARG)	37+3
3rd place, bronze medalist(s)	Derrick Scott Mein (USA)	20	3rd place, bronze medalist(s)	Hayden Stewart (USA)	27
(Italy) Lonato del Garda			(Italy) Lonato del Garda		
1st place, gold medalist(s)	Erik Varga (SVK)	31-1	1st place, gold medalist(s)	Luigi Lodde (ITA)	40
2nd place, silver medalist(s)	Josip Glasnović (CRO)	31-0	2nd place, silver medalist(s)	Vincent Hancock (USA)	38
3rd place, bronze medalist(s)	Adriá Martínez (ESP)	21	3rd place, bronze medalist(s)	Gabriele Rossetti (ITA)	28
(Azerbaijan) Baku			(Azerbaijan) Baku		
1st place, gold medalist(s)	Jiří Lipták (CZE)	35	1st place, gold medalist(s)	Vincent Hancock (USA)	34
2nd place, silver medalist(s)	Talal Al-Rashidi (KUW)	33	2nd place, silver medalist(s)	Nicolas Lejeune (FRA)	29
3rd place, bronze medalist(s)	Daniele Resca (ITA)	23	3rd place, bronze medalist(s)	Jesper Hansen (DEN)	25
(South Korea) Changwon			(South Korea) Changwon		
1st place, gold medalist(s)	Qi Ying (CHN)	29	1st place, gold medalist(s)	Mairaj Ahmad Khan (IND)	37
2nd place, silver medalist(s)	Lorenzo Ferrari (ITA)	27	2nd place, silver medalist(s)	Kim Min-su (KOR)	36
3rd place, bronze medalist(s)	Daniele Resca (ITA)	21	3rd place, bronze medalist(s)	Ben Llewellin (GBR)	26

=== Team results ===
	10 metre air pistol		10 metre air rifle		25 metre rapid fire pistol		50 metre rifle three positions		Skeet		Trap	
(Egypt) Cairo	1st place, gold medalist(s)	Michael Schwald; Robin Walter; Philipp Grimm (GER)	1st place, gold medalist(s)	Miran Maričić; Petar Gorša; Borna Petanjek (CRO)	1st place, gold medalist(s)	Christian Reitz; Oliver Geis; Florian Peter (GER)	1st place, gold medalist(s)	Thomas Mathis; Gernot Rumpler; Andreas Thum (AUT)	No shotgun events			
(Egypt) Cairo	2nd place, silver medalist(s)	İsmail Keleş; Yusuf Dikeç; Serdar Demirel (TUR)	2nd place, silver medalist(s)	Danilo Sollazzo; Lorenzo Bacci; Riccardo Armiraglio (ITA)	2nd place, silver medalist(s)	Anish Anish; Gurpreet Singh; Bhavesh Shekhawat (IND)	2nd place, silver medalist(s)	Jiří Přívratský; Petr Nymburský; Filip Nepejchal (CZE)	No shotgun events			
(Egypt) Cairo	3rd place, bronze medalist(s)	Luca Tesconi; Alessio Torracchi; Paolo Monna (ITA)	3rd place, bronze medalist(s)	Filip Nepejchal; Aleš Entrichel; Jiří Přívratský (CZE)	3rd place, bronze medalist(s)	Martin Strnad; Martin Podhráský; Tomáš Těhan (CZE)	3rd place, bronze medalist(s)	Ole Martin Halvorsen; Henrik Larsen; Jon-Hermann Hegg (NOR)	No shotgun events			
(Cyprus) Nicosia	No pistol/rifle events								1st place, gold medalist(s)	Tammaro Cassandro; Elia Sdruccioli; Gabriele Rossetti (ITA)	1st place, gold medalist(s)	Naser Al-Meqlad; Talal Al-Rashidi; Abdulrahman Al-Faihan (KUW)
(Cyprus) Nicosia	No pistol/rifle events								2nd place, silver medalist(s)	Phillip Russell Jungman; Adam Mc Bee; Hayden Stewart (USA)	2nd place, silver medalist(s)	Prithviraj Tondaiman; Vivaan Kapoor; Zoravar Singh Sandhu (IND)
(Cyprus) Nicosia	No pistol/rifle events								3rd place, bronze medalist(s)	Sven Korte; Vincent Haaga; Felix Haase (GER)	3rd place, bronze medalist(s)	Tomasz Pasierbski; Piotr Kowalczyk; Daniel Mrózek (POL)
(Peru) Lima	No pistol/rifle events								1st place, gold medalist(s)	Cristian Ciccotti; Domenico Simeone; Marco Sablone (ITA)	1st place, gold medalist(s)	William Hinton; Derrick Mein; Casey Wallace (USA)
(Peru) Lima	No pistol/rifle events								2nd place, silver medalist(s)	Miguel Pizarro; Jesus Medero; Luis Bermudez (PUR)	2nd place, silver medalist(s)	Alberto Fernández; Adrià Martínez Torres; Manuel Murcia (ESP)
(Peru) Lima	No pistol/rifle events								3rd place, bronze medalist(s)	Nicolás Pacheco; Flavio Artoni; Nicolás Giha (PER)	3rd place, bronze medalist(s)	Shapath Bharadwaj; Kynan Chenai; Manavaditya Singh Rathore (IND)
(Brazil) Rio de Janeiro	1st place, gold medalist(s)	Paul Fröhlich; Robin Walter; David Probst (GER)	1st place, gold medalist(s)	Lucas Kozeniesky; Rylan Kissell; William Shaner (USA)	1st place, gold medalist(s)	Christian Reitz; Oliver Geis; Florian Peter (GER)	1st place, gold medalist(s)	Jiří Přívratský; František Smetana; Petr Nymburský (CZE)	No shotgun events			
(Brazil) Rio de Janeiro	2nd place, silver medalist(s)	Vahid Golkhandan; Sajjad Pourhosseini; Javad Foroughi (IRI)	2nd place, silver medalist(s)	Petr Nymburský; Jiří Přívratský; František Smetana (CZE)	2nd place, silver medalist(s)	Emerson Duarte; Vladimir Silveira; Felipe Wu (BRA)	2nd place, silver medalist(s)	Henrik Larsen; Simon Claussen; Jon-Hermann Hegg (NOR)	No shotgun events			
(Brazil) Rio de Janeiro	3rd place, bronze medalist(s)	Philipe Neves; Felipe Wu; Roberto Gomes (BRA)	3rd place, bronze medalist(s)	Henrik Larsen; Jon-Hermann Hegg; Simon Claussen (NOR)	3rd place, bronze medalist(s)	Schwakon Triniphakorn; Ram Khamhaeng; Noppadon Sutiviruch (THA)	3rd place, bronze medalist(s)	Ivan Roe; Lucas Kozeniesky; Timothy Sherry (USA)	No shotgun events			
(Italy) Lonato del Garda	No pistol/rifle events								1st place, gold medalist(s)	Jan Zamecnik; Jakub Tomeček; Tomáš Nýdrle (CZE)	1st place, gold medalist(s)	Giovanni Cernogoraz; Josip Glasnovic; Anton Glasnovic (CRO)
(Italy) Lonato del Garda	No pistol/rifle events								2nd place, silver medalist(s)	Giancarlo Tazza; Niccolò Sodi; Gabriele Rossetti (ITA)	2nd place, silver medalist(s)	Vivaan Kapoor; Kynan Chenai; Prithviraj Tondaiman (IND)
(Italy) Lonato del Garda	No pistol/rifle events								3rd place, bronze medalist(s)	Nikolaos Mavrommatis; Charalambos Chalkiadakis; Efthimios Mitas (GRE)	3rd place, bronze medalist(s)	Massimo Fabbrizi; Giovanni Pellielo; Lorenzo Ferrari (ITA)
(Azerbaijan) Baku	1st place, gold medalist(s)	Mohammad Rasool Efati; Sajjad Pourhosseini; Javad Foroughi (IRI)	1st place, gold medalist(s)	Park Ha-jun; Kim Sang-do; Bang Seung-ho (KOR)	1st place, gold medalist(s)	Han Dae-yoon; Lee Jae-kyoon; Song Jong-ho (KOR)	1st place, gold medalist(s)	Josip Sikavica; Miran Maričić; Andrija Mikuljan (CRO)	1st place, gold medalist(s)	Vincent Hancock; Phillip Jungman; Adam McBee (USA)	1st place, gold medalist(s)	Naser Al-Meqlad; Abdulrahman Al-Faihan; Talal Al-Rashidi (KUW)
(Azerbaijan) Baku	2nd place, silver medalist(s)	Paolo Monna; Luca Tesconi; Federico Nilo Maldini (ITA)	2nd place, silver medalist(s)	Jack Rossiter; Dane Sampson; Michael Davis (AUS)	2nd place, silver medalist(s)	Maksym Horodynets; Volodymyr Pasternak; Pavlo Korostylov (UKR)	2nd place, silver medalist(s)	Goldi Gurjar; Swapnil Kusale; Deepak Kumar (IND)	2nd place, silver medalist(s)	Nikolaos Mavrommatis; Charalambos Chalkiadakis; Efthimios Mitas (GRE)	2nd place, silver medalist(s)	Derrick Mein; William Hinton; Casey Wallace (USA)
(Azerbaijan) Baku	3rd place, bronze medalist(s)	Michael Schwald; David Probst; Christian Reitz (GER)	3rd place, bronze medalist(s)	Josip Sikavica; Miran Maričić; Andrija Mikuljan (CRO)	3rd place, bronze medalist(s)	Tommaso Chelli; Riccardo Mazzetti; Massimo Spinella (ITA)	3rd place, bronze medalist(s)	Oleh Tsarkov; Oleksandr Halkin; Serhiy Kulish (UKR)	3rd place, bronze medalist(s)	Mansour Al-Rashidi; Abdullah Al-Rashidi; Abdulaziz Al-Saad (KUW)	3rd place, bronze medalist(s)	Giovanni Cernogoraz; Josip Glasnovic; Anton Glasnovic (CRO)
(South Korea) Changwon	1st place, gold medalist(s)	Paolo Monna; Luca Tesconi; Alessio Torracchi (ITA)	1st place, gold medalist(s)	Arjun Babuta; Shahu Tushar Mane; Paarth Makhija (IND)	1st place, gold medalist(s)	Matěj Rampula; Martin Podhráský; Tomáš Těhan (CZE)	1st place, gold medalist(s)	Jiří Přívratský; Petr Nymburský; Filip Nepejchal (CZE)	1st place, gold medalist(s)	Giancarlo Tazza; Niccolò Sodi; Erik Pittini (ITA)	1st place, gold medalist(s)	Adrián Drobný; Michal Slamka; Hubert Olejnik (SVK)
(South Korea) Changwon	2nd place, silver medalist(s)	Shiva Narwal; Naveen Naveen; Sagar Dangi (IND)	2nd place, silver medalist(s)	Park Ha-jun; Kim Sang-do; Bang Seung-ho (KOR)	2nd place, silver medalist(s)	Anish Anish; Sameer Sameer; Vijayveer Sidhu (IND)	2nd place, silver medalist(s)	Chain Singh; Aishwary Pratap Singh Tomar; Sanjeev Rajput (IND)	2nd place, silver medalist(s)	Dun Yueheng; Lyu Jianlin; Yu Lingfeng (CHN)	2nd place, silver medalist(s)	Prithviraj Tondaiman; Bhowneesh Mendiratta; Vivaan Kapoor (IND)
(South Korea) Changwon	3rd place, bronze medalist(s)	Vladimir Svechnikov; Mukhammad Kamalov; Veniamin Nikitin (UZB)	3rd place, bronze medalist(s)	Petr Nymburský; Jiří Přívratský; Aleš Entrichel (CZE)	3rd place, bronze medalist(s)	Han Dae-yoon; Lee Jae-kyoon; Song Jong-ho (KOR)	3rd place, bronze medalist(s)	Dane Sampson; Jack Rossiter; Michael Edward Davis (AUS)	3rd place, bronze medalist(s)	Karl Frederick Killander; Ben Llewellin; Gareth McAuley (GBR)	3rd place, bronze medalist(s)	Chen Liang; Yu Haicheng; Qi Ying (CHN)

== Women's results ==
=== Rifle events ===
50 metre rifle three positions		10 metre air rifle	
(Egypt) Cairo		(Egypt) Cairo	
1st place, gold medalist(s)	Jeanette Hegg Duestad (NOR)	1st place, gold medalist(s)	Océanne Muller (FRA)
2nd place, silver medalist(s)	Sofia Ceccarello (ITA)	2nd place, silver medalist(s)	Anastasiia Galashina
3rd place, bronze medalist(s)	Jenny Stene (NOR)	3rd place, bronze medalist(s)	Alison Weisz (USA)
(Brazil) Rio de Janeiro		(Brazil) Rio de Janeiro	
1st place, gold medalist(s)	Jeanette Hegg Duestad (NOR)	1st place, gold medalist(s)	Anna Janssen (GER)
2nd place, silver medalist(s)	Anna Janssen (GER)	2nd place, silver medalist(s)	Océanne Muller (FRA)
3rd place, bronze medalist(s)	Sagen Maddalena (USA)	3rd place, bronze medalist(s)	Laura Ilie (ROU)
(Azerbaijan) Baku		(Azerbaijan) Baku	
1st place, gold medalist(s)	Rikke Ibsen (DEN)	1st place, gold medalist(s)	Océanne Muller (FRA)
2nd place, silver medalist(s)	Anjum Moudgil (IND)	2nd place, silver medalist(s)	Aneta Stankiewicz (POL)
3rd place, bronze medalist(s)	Lee Eun-Seo (KOR)	3rd place, bronze medalist(s)	Laura Ilie (ROU)
(South Korea) Changwon		(South Korea) Changwon	
1st place, gold medalist(s)	Anna Janssen (GER)	1st place, gold medalist(s)	Lucie Brázdová (CZE)
2nd place, silver medalist(s)	Barbara Gambaro (ITA)	2nd place, silver medalist(s)	Roxana Sidi (ROU)
3rd place, bronze medalist(s)	Anjum Moudgil (IND)	3rd place, bronze medalist(s)	Eszter Mészáros (HUN)

=== Pistol events ===
25 metre pistol		10 metre air pistol	
(Egypt) Cairo		(Egypt) Cairo	
1st place, gold medalist(s)	Mathilde Lamolle (FRA)	1st place, gold medalist(s)	Anna Korakaki (GRE)
2nd place, silver medalist(s)	Veronika Major (HUN)	2nd place, silver medalist(s)	Esha Singh (IND)
3rd place, bronze medalist(s)	Anna Korakaki (GRE)	3rd place, bronze medalist(s)	Antoaneta Kostadinova (BUL)
(Brazil) Rio de Janeiro		(Brazil) Rio de Janeiro	
1st place, gold medalist(s)	Camille Jedrzejewski (FRA)	1st place, gold medalist(s)	Zorana Arunović (SRB)
2nd place, silver medalist(s)	Doreen Vennekamp (GER)	2nd place, silver medalist(s)	Anna Korakaki (GRE)
3rd place, bronze medalist(s)	Sylvia Steiner (AUT)	3rd place, bronze medalist(s)	Camille Jedrzejewski (FRA)
(Azerbaijan) Baku		(Azerbaijan) Baku	
1st place, gold medalist(s)	Antoaneta Kostadinova (BUL)	1st place, gold medalist(s)	Klaudia Breś (POL)
2nd place, silver medalist(s)	Veronika Major (HUN)	2nd place, silver medalist(s)	Camille Jedrzejewski (FRA)
3rd place, bronze medalist(s)	Anastasiia Nimets (UKR)	3rd place, bronze medalist(s)	Antoaneta Kostadinova (BUL)
(South Korea) Changwon		(South Korea) Changwon	
1st place, gold medalist(s)	Teh Xiu Hong (SGP)	1st place, gold medalist(s)	Zorana Arunović (SRB)
2nd place, silver medalist(s)	Mathilde Lamolle (FRA)	2nd place, silver medalist(s)	Yu Ai-wen (TPE)
3rd place, bronze medalist(s)	Teo Shun Xie (SGP)	3rd place, bronze medalist(s)	Veronika Major (HUN)

=== Shotgun events ===
Trap			Skeet		
(Cyprus) Nicosia			(Cyprus) Nicosia		
1st place, gold medalist(s)	Zuzana Rehák-Štefečeková (SVK)	31	1st place, gold medalist(s)	Amber Hill (GBR)	34
2nd place, silver medalist(s)	Silvana Stanco (ITA)	28	2nd place, silver medalist(s)	Danka Barteková (SVK)	28
3rd place, bronze medalist(s)	Rachel Tozier (USA)	19	3rd place, bronze medalist(s)	Austen Smith (USA)	23
(Peru) Lima			(Peru) Lima		
1st place, gold medalist(s)	Gaia Ragazzini (ITA)	30	1st place, gold medalist(s)	Dania Jo Vizzi (USA)	36
2nd place, silver medalist(s)	Kayle Browning (USA)	27	2nd place, silver medalist(s)	Austen Smith (USA)	35
3rd place, bronze medalist(s)	Alessandra Della Valle (ITA)	20	3rd place, bronze medalist(s)	Lucie Anastassiou (FRA)	25
(Italy) Lonato del Garda			(Italy) Lonato del Garda		
1st place, gold medalist(s)	Kirsty Hegarty (GBR)	31	1st place, gold medalist(s)	Caitlin Connor (USA)	37
2nd place, silver medalist(s)	Augusta Campos (PUR)	28	2nd place, silver medalist(s)	Amber Hill (GBR)	36
3rd place, bronze medalist(s)	Ray Bassil (LBN)	21	3rd place, bronze medalist(s)	Nadine Messerschmidt (GER)	26
(Azerbaijan) Baku			(Azerbaijan) Baku		
1st place, gold medalist(s)	Noora Antikainen (FIN)	31	1st place, gold medalist(s)	Lucie Anastassiou (FRA)	36
2nd place, silver medalist(s)	Fátima Gálvez (ESP)	29	2nd place, silver medalist(s)	Caitlin Connor (USA)	31
3rd place, bronze medalist(s)	Laetisha Scanlan (AUS)	22	3rd place, bronze medalist(s)	Austen Smith (USA)	24
(South Korea) Changwon			(South Korea) Changwon		
1st place, gold medalist(s)	Wu Cuicui (CHN)	31	1st place, gold medalist(s)	Lucie Anastassiou (FRA)	34+11
2nd place, silver medalist(s)	Penny Smith (AUS)	30	2nd place, silver medalist(s)	Amber Hill (GBR)	34+10
3rd place, bronze medalist(s)	Lucy Charlotte Hall (GBR)	19	3rd place, bronze medalist(s)	Chiara Di Marziantonio (ITA)	23

=== Team results ===
	10 metre air pistol		10 metre air rifle		25 metre pistol		50 metre rifle three positions		Skeet		Trap	
(Egypt) Cairo	1st place, gold medalist(s)	Esha Singh; Ruchita Vinerkar; Shri Nivetha Paramanantham (IND)	1st place, gold medalist(s)	Eszter Mészáros; Eszter Dénes; Gitta Bajos (HUN)	1st place, gold medalist(s)	Rahi Sarnobat; Rhythm Sangwan; Esha Singh (IND)	1st place, gold medalist(s)	Urška Kuharič; Živa Dvoršak; Klavdija Jerovšek (SLO)	No shotgun events			
(Egypt) Cairo	2nd place, silver medalist(s)	Sandra Reitz; Andrea Katharina Heckner; Carina Wimmer (GER)	2nd place, silver medalist(s)	Jeanette Hegg Duestad; Jenny Stene; Mari Bardseng Lovseth (NOR)	2nd place, silver medalist(s)	Teo Shun Xie; Teh Xiu Hong; Tan Ling Chiao Nicole (SGP)	2nd place, silver medalist(s)	Mary Tucker; Katie Zaun; Sagen Maddalena (USA)	No shotgun events			
(Egypt) Cairo	3rd place, bronze medalist(s)	Wu Chia-ying; Tien Chia-chen; Yu Ai-wen (TPE)	3rd place, bronze medalist(s)	Ho Xiu Yi; Tan Qian Xiu Adele; Tan Fernel Qian Ni (SGP)	3rd place, bronze medalist(s)	Wu Chia-ying; Yu Ai-wen; Tien Chia-chen (TPE)	3rd place, bronze medalist(s)	Franziska Stark; Chiara Leone; Nina Christen (SUI)	No shotgun events			
(Cyprus) Nicosia	No pistol/rifle events								1st place, gold medalist(s)	Chiara Cainero; Martina Bartolomei; Diana Bacosi (ITA)	1st place, gold medalist(s)	Penny Smith; Laetisha Scanlan; Catherine Skinner (AUS)
(Cyprus) Nicosia	No pistol/rifle events								2nd place, silver medalist(s)	Austen Smith; Dania Jo Vizzi; Caitlin Connor (USA)	2nd place, silver medalist(s)	Aeriel Skinner; Rachel Tozier; Ida Faye Brown (USA)
(Cyprus) Nicosia	No pistol/rifle events								3rd place, bronze medalist(s)	Danka Bartekova; Lucia Kopcanova; Vanesa Hockova (SVK)	3rd place, bronze medalist(s)	Sarsenkul Rysbekova; Mariya Dmitriyenko; Aizhan Dosmagambetova (KAZ)
(Peru) Lima	No pistol/rifle events								1st place, gold medalist(s)	Caitlin Connor; Austen Smith; Dania Jo Vizzi (USA)	1st place, gold medalist(s)	Kayle Browning; Aeriel Skinner; Rachel Tozier (USA)
(Peru) Lima	No pistol/rifle events								2nd place, silver medalist(s)	Katiuscia Spada; Francesca Del Prete; Simona Scocchetti (ITA)	2nd place, silver medalist(s)	Adriana Ruano; Stefanie Goetzke; Waleska Soto (GUA)
(Peru) Lima	No pistol/rifle events								3rd place, bronze medalist(s)	not awarded	3rd place, bronze medalist(s)	Ariadna Acevedo; Augusta Campos-Martyn; Ana Latorre (PUR)
(Brazil) Rio de Janeiro	1st place, gold medalist(s)	Golnoush Sebghatollahi; Hanieh Rostamian; Elham Harijani (IRI)	1st place, gold medalist(s)	Anna Janssen; Lisa Müller; Anita Mangold (GER)	1st place, gold medalist(s)	Doreen Vennekamp; Sandra Reitz; Monika Karsch (GER)	1st place, gold medalist(s)	Jeanette Hegg Duestad; Kathrine Lund; Jenny Stene (NOR)	No shotgun events			
(Brazil) Rio de Janeiro	2nd place, silver medalist(s)	Chidchanok Hirunphoem; Tanyaporn Prucksakorn; Kanyakorn Hirunphoem (THA)	2nd place, silver medalist(s)	Jeanette Hegg Duestad; Kathrine Lund; Jenny Stene (NOR)	2nd place, silver medalist(s)	Kanyakorn Hirunphoem; Tanyaporn Prucksakorn; Chidchanok Hirunphoem (THA)	2nd place, silver medalist(s)	Morgan Kreb; Mary Tucker; Sagen Maddalena (USA)	No shotgun events			
(Brazil) Rio de Janeiro	3rd place, bronze medalist(s)	Andrea Heckner; Sandra Reitz; Doreen Vennekamp (GER)	3rd place, bronze medalist(s)	Najmeh Khedmati; Fatemeh Karamzadeh; Fatemeh Amini (IRI)	3rd place, bronze medalist(s)	Thais Carvalho Moura; Ana Luiza Souza Lima; Paula Yado (BRA)	3rd place, bronze medalist(s)	Chiara Leone; Franziska Stark; Nina Christen (SUI)	No shotgun events			
(Italy) Lonato del Garda	No pistol/rifle events								1st place, gold medalist(s)	Dania Jo Vizzi; Amber English; Caitlin Connor (USA)	1st place, gold medalist(s)	Penny Smith; Laetisha Scanlan; Catherine Skinner (AUS)
(Italy) Lonato del Garda	No pistol/rifle events								2nd place, silver medalist(s)	Katiuscia Spada; Martina Maruzzo; Diana Bacosi (ITA)	2nd place, silver medalist(s)	Giulia Grassia; Maria Lucia Palmitessa; Silvana Stanco (ITA)
(Italy) Lonato del Garda	No pistol/rifle events								3rd place, bronze medalist(s)	Nadine Messerschmidt; Eva-Tamara Reichert; Valentina Umhöfer (GER)	3rd place, bronze medalist(s)	Beatriz Martínez; Francisca Muñoz; Fátima Gálvez (ESP)
(Azerbaijan) Baku	1st place, gold medalist(s)	Yoo Hyun-young; Kim Min-jung; Kim Bo-Mi (KOR)	1st place, gold medalist(s)	Shreya Aggarwal; Elavenil Valarvian; Ramita Ramita (IND)	1st place, gold medalist(s)	Oksana Kovalchuk; Olena Kostevych; Anastasiia Nimets (UKR)	1st place, gold medalist(s)	Karina Stette; Mari Bårdseng Løvseth; Johanna Reksten (NOR)	1st place, gold medalist(s)	Nadine Messerschmidt; Nele Wissmer; Christine Wenzel (GER)	1st place, gold medalist(s)	Kayle Browning; Aeriel Skinner; Rachel Tozier (USA)
(Azerbaijan) Baku	2nd place, silver medalist(s)	Chidchanok Hirunphoem; Tanyaporn Prucksakorn; Chawisa Paduka (THA)	2nd place, silver medalist(s)	Anna Nielsen; Emma Nørholm Koch; Rikke Ibsen (DEN)	2nd place, silver medalist(s)	Chidchanok Hirunphoem; Tanyaporn Prucksakorn; Chawisa Paduka (THA)	2nd place, silver medalist(s)	Yelizaveta Korol; Yelizaveta Bezrukova; Arina Altukhova (KAZ)	2nd place, silver medalist(s)	Austen Smith; Dania Jo Vizzi; Caitlin Connor (USA)	2nd place, silver medalist(s)	Charlie Hudson-Czerniecki; Laetisha Scanlan; Catherine Skinner (AUS)
(Azerbaijan) Baku	3rd place, bronze medalist(s)	Svenja Berge; Sandra Reitz; Doreen Vennekamp (GER)	3rd place, bronze medalist(s)	Julia Piotrowska; Aneta Stankiewicz; Natalia Kochańska (POL)	3rd place, bronze medalist(s)	Yoo Hyun-young; Han Ji-young; Kim Lan-a (KOR)	3rd place, bronze medalist(s)	Julia Piotrowska; Aneta Stankiewicz; Natalia Kochańska (POL)	3rd place, bronze medalist(s)	Zoya Kravchenko; Rinata Nassyrova; Assem Orynbay (KAZ)	3rd place, bronze medalist(s)	Satu Mäkelä-Nummela; Noora Antikainen; Mopsi Veromaa (FIN)
(South Korea) Changwon	1st place, gold medalist(s)	Yoo Hyun-young; Kim Min-jung; Kim Bo-Mi (KOR)	1st place, gold medalist(s)	Keum Ji-hyeon; Lee Eun-seo; Gwon Da-yeong (KOR)	1st place, gold medalist(s)	Teo Shun Xie; Teh Xiu Hong; Teh Xiu Yi (SGP)	1st place, gold medalist(s)	Jolyn Beer; Lisa Müller; Anna Janssen (GER)	1st place, gold medalist(s)	Wei Meng; Wei Ning; Huang Sixue (CHN)	1st place, gold medalist(s)	Kang Gee-eun; Lee Bo-na; Cho Seo-nah (KOR)
(South Korea) Changwon	2nd place, silver medalist(s)	Palak Palak; Rhythm Sangwan; Yuvika Tomar (IND)	2nd place, silver medalist(s)	Ghosh Mehuli; Elavenil Valarvian; Ramita Ramita (IND)	2nd place, silver medalist(s)	Pim-on Klaisuban; Tanyaporn Prucksakorn; Chawisa Paduka (THA)	2nd place, silver medalist(s)	Park Hae-mi; Song Chae-won; Lee Eun-seo (KOR)	2nd place, silver medalist(s)	Isarapa Imprasertsuk; Sutiya Jiewchaloemmit; Nutchaya Sutarporn (THA)	2nd place, silver medalist(s)	Zhang Ting; Wang Xiaojing; Wu Cuicui (CHN)
(South Korea) Changwon	3rd place, bronze medalist(s)	Teo Shun Xie; Teh Xiu Hong; Teh Xiu Yi (SGP)	3rd place, bronze medalist(s)	Eszter Mészáros; Eszter Dénes; Gitta Bajos (HUN)	3rd place, bronze medalist(s)	Yoo Hyun-young; Han Ji-young; Kim Lan-a (KOR)	3rd place, bronze medalist(s)	Anjum Moudgil; Ashi Chouksey; Sift Kaur Samra (IND)	3rd place, bronze medalist(s)	Danka Bartekova; Monika Stibrava; Vanesa Hockova (SVK)	3rd place, bronze medalist(s)	not awarded

== Mixed team results ==
	10 metre air pistol		10 metre air rifle		25 metre rapid fire pistol		50 metre rifle three positions		Skeet		Trap	
(Egypt) Cairo	1st place, gold medalist(s)	Zorana Arunović; Damir Mikec (SRB)	1st place, gold medalist(s)	Jeanette Hegg Duestad; Jon-Hermann Hegg (NOR)	1st place, gold medalist(s)	Rhythm Sangwan; Anish Anish (IND)	1st place, gold medalist(s)	Jenny Stene; Jon-Hermann Hegg (NOR)	No shotgun events			
(Egypt) Cairo	2nd place, silver medalist(s)	Yasemin Beyza Yılmaz; İsmail Keleş (TUR)	2nd place, silver medalist(s)	Sofia Ceccarello; Danilo Sollazzo (ITA)	2nd place, silver medalist(s)	Chawisa Paduka; Ram Khamhaeng (THA)	2nd place, silver medalist(s)	Jolyn Beer; Maximilian Dallinger (GER)	No shotgun events			
(Egypt) Cairo	3rd place, bronze medalist(s)	Andrea Katharina Heckner; Robin Walter (GER)	3rd place, bronze medalist(s)	Valentina Gustin; Petar Gorša (CRO)	3rd place, bronze medalist(s)	Teo Shun Xie; Lim Swee Hon (SGP)	3rd place, bronze medalist(s)	Sriyanka Sarangi; Akhil Sheoran (IND)	No shotgun events			
(Egypt) Cairo	3rd place, bronze medalist(s)	Anna Kokaraki; Dionysios Kokarakis (GRE)	3rd place, bronze medalist(s)	Teodora Vukojević; Milutin Stefanović (SRB)	3rd place, bronze medalist(s)	Teo Shun Xie; Lim Swee Hon (SGP)	3rd place, bronze medalist(s)	Sriyanka Sarangi; Akhil Sheoran (IND)	No shotgun events			
(Cyprus) Nicosia	No pistol/rifle events								1st place, gold medalist(s)	Tammaro Cassandro; Diana Bacosi (ITA)	1st place, gold medalist(s)	Murat İlbilgi; Rümeysa Pelin Kaya (TUR)
(Cyprus) Nicosia	No pistol/rifle events								2nd place, silver medalist(s)	Caitlin Connor; Adam McBee (USA)	2nd place, silver medalist(s)	James Willett; Laetisha Scanlan (AUS)
(Cyprus) Nicosia	No pistol/rifle events								3rd place, bronze medalist(s)	Gabriele Rossetti; Chiara Cainero (ITA)	3rd place, bronze medalist(s)	Mitchell Iles-Crevatin; Penny Smith (AUS)
(Cyprus) Nicosia	No pistol/rifle events								3rd place, bronze medalist(s)	Austen Smith; Phillip Jungman (USA)	3rd place, bronze medalist(s)	Zuzana Rehák-Štefečeková; Marián Kovačócy (SVK)
(Peru) Lima	No pistol/rifle events								1st place, gold medalist(s)	Domenico Simeone; Simona Scocchetti (ITA)	1st place, gold medalist(s)	Alberto Fernández; Fátima Gálvez (ESP)
(Peru) Lima	No pistol/rifle events								2nd place, silver medalist(s)	Austen Smith; Dustan Taylor (USA)	2nd place, silver medalist(s)	Jorge Orozco; Alejandra Ramírez (MEX)
(Peru) Lima	No pistol/rifle events								3rd place, bronze medalist(s)	Hayden Stewart; Caitlin Connor (USA)	3rd place, bronze medalist(s)	Andrés García; Cristina Beltrán (ESP)
(Peru) Lima	No pistol/rifle events								3rd place, bronze medalist(s)	Éric Delaunay; Lucie Anastassiou (FRA)	3rd place, bronze medalist(s)	Kayle Browning; Derek Haldeman (USA)
(Brazil) Rio de Janeiro	1st place, gold medalist(s)	Sandra Reitz; Christian Reitz (GER)	1st place, gold medalist(s)	Lucie Brázdová; Jiří Přívratský (CZE)	not contested		1st place, gold medalist(s)	Lucie Brázdová; Jiří Přívratský (CZE)	No shotgun events			
(Brazil) Rio de Janeiro	2nd place, silver medalist(s)	Tanyaporn Prucksakorn; Noppadon Sutiviruch (THA)	2nd place, silver medalist(s)	Jeanette Hegg Duestad; Jon-Hermann Hegg (NOR)	not contested		2nd place, silver medalist(s)	Jeanette Hegg Duestad; Jon-Hermann Hegg (NOR)	No shotgun events			
(Brazil) Rio de Janeiro	3rd place, bronze medalist(s)	Golnoush Sebghatollahi; Javad Foroughi (IRI)	3rd place, bronze medalist(s)	Alison Weisz; William Shaner (USA)	not contested		3rd place, bronze medalist(s)	Jenny Stene; Simon Claussen (NOR)	No shotgun events			
(Brazil) Rio de Janeiro	3rd place, bronze medalist(s)	Camille Jedrzejewski; Florian Fouquet (FRA)	3rd place, bronze medalist(s)	Gitta Bajos; István Péni (HUN)	not contested		3rd place, bronze medalist(s)	Jenny Stene; Simon Claussen (NOR)	No shotgun events			
(Italy) Lonato del Garda	No pistol/rifle events								1st place, gold medalist(s)	Caitlin Connor; Vincent Hancock (USA)	1st place, gold medalist(s)	Alberto Fernández; Fátima Gálvez (ESP)
(Italy) Lonato del Garda	No pistol/rifle events								2nd place, silver medalist(s)	Nicolas Lejeune; Lucie Anastassiou (FRA)	2nd place, silver medalist(s)	Adriá Martínez; Mar Magrina (ESP)
(Italy) Lonato del Garda	No pistol/rifle events								3rd place, bronze medalist(s)	Emily Jane Hibbs; Karl Killander (GBR)	3rd place, bronze medalist(s)	Zuzana Rehák-Štefečeková; Adrian Drobný (SVK)
(Italy) Lonato del Garda	No pistol/rifle events								3rd place, bronze medalist(s)	Gabriele Rossetti; Diana Bacosi (ITA)	3rd place, bronze medalist(s)	James Willett; Catherine Skinner (AUS)
(Azerbaijan) Baku	1st place, gold medalist(s)	Anna Kokaraki; Dionysios Kokarakis (GRE)	1st place, gold medalist(s)	Keum Ji-hyeon; Park Ha-jun (KOR)	1st place, gold medalist(s)	Kim Lan-a; Song Jong-ho (KOR)	1st place, gold medalist(s)	Ashi Chouksey; Swapnil Kusale (IND)	1st place, gold medalist(s)	Austen Smith; Vincent Hancock (USA)	1st place, gold medalist(s)	James Willett; Laetisha Scanlan (AUS)
(Azerbaijan) Baku	2nd place, silver medalist(s)	Olena Kostevych; Oleh Omelchuk (UKR)	2nd place, silver medalist(s)	Andrea Arsović; Lazar Kovačević (SRB)	2nd place, silver medalist(s)	Yulia Korostylova; Pavlo Korostylov (UKR)	2nd place, silver medalist(s)	Daria Tykhova; Serhiy Kulish (UKR)	2nd place, silver medalist(s)	Christine Wenzel; Tilo Schreier (GER)	2nd place, silver medalist(s)	Maria Inês Coelho; João Azevedo (POR)
(Azerbaijan) Baku	3rd place, bronze medalist(s)	Zorana Arunović; Damir Mikec (SRB)	3rd place, bronze medalist(s)	Gwon Da-yeong; Kim Sang-do (KOR)	3rd place, bronze medalist(s)	Anastasiia Nimets; Maksym Horodynets (UKR)	3rd place, bronze medalist(s)	Aneta Stankiewicz; Tomasz Bartnik (POL)	3rd place, bronze medalist(s)	Barbora Šumová; Jakub Tomeček (CZE)	3rd place, bronze medalist(s)	Tolga Tunçer; Rümeysa Pelin Kaya (TUR)
(Azerbaijan) Baku	3rd place, bronze medalist(s)	Şevval İlayda Tarhan; Yusuf Dikeç (TUR)	3rd place, bronze medalist(s)	Julia Piotrowska; Maciej Kowalewicz (POL)	3rd place, bronze medalist(s)	Anastasiia Nimets; Maksym Horodynets (UKR)	3rd place, bronze medalist(s)	Aneta Stankiewicz; Tomasz Bartnik (POL)	3rd place, bronze medalist(s)	Gabriele Rossetti; Chiara Cainero (ITA)	3rd place, bronze medalist(s)	Mariya Dmitriyenko; Victor Khassyanov (KAZ)
(South Korea) Changwon	1st place, gold medalist(s)	Zorana Arunović; Damir Mikec (SRB)	1st place, gold medalist(s)	Mehuli Ghosh; Shahu Tushar Mane (IND)	1st place, gold medalist(s)	Han Dae-yoon; Kim Jang-mi (KOR)	1st place, gold medalist(s)	Lucie Brázdová; Jiří Přívratský (CZE)	1st place, gold medalist(s)	Ben Llewellin; Amber Hill (GBR)	1st place, gold medalist(s)	James Willett; Penny Smith (AUS)
(South Korea) Changwon	2nd place, silver medalist(s)	Anna Kokaraki; Dionysios Kokarakis (GRE)	2nd place, silver medalist(s)	Eszter Mészáros; István Péni (HUN)	2nd place, silver medalist(s)	Kim Lan-a; Song Jong-ho (KOR)	2nd place, silver medalist(s)	Kim Jong-hyun; Song Chae-won (KOR)	2nd place, silver medalist(s)	Chiara Di Marziantonio; Niccolò Sodi (ITA)	2nd place, silver medalist(s)	Thomas Grice; Catherine Skinner (AUS)
(South Korea) Changwon	3rd place, bronze medalist(s)	Maria Varricchio; Federico Nilo Maldini (ITA)	3rd place, bronze medalist(s)	Lucie Brázdová; Jiří Přívratský (CZE)	3rd place, bronze medalist(s)	Rhythm Sangwan; Anish Anish (IND)	3rd place, bronze medalist(s)	Dennis Welsch; Anna Janssen (GER)	3rd place, bronze medalist(s)	Simona Scocchetti; Giancarlo Tazza (ITA)	3rd place, bronze medalist(s)	Andreas Löw; Kathrin Murche (GER)
(South Korea) Changwon	3rd place, bronze medalist(s)	Palak Palak; Shiva Narwal (IND)	3rd place, bronze medalist(s)	Olga Tashtchiev; Sergy Rikhter (ISR)	3rd place, bronze medalist(s)	Rhythm Sangwan; Anish Anish (IND)	3rd place, bronze medalist(s)	Dennis Welsch; Anna Janssen (GER)	3rd place, bronze medalist(s)	Lucie Anastassiou; Nicolas Lejeune (FRA)	3rd place, bronze medalist(s)	Yu Haicheng; Wang Xiaojing (CHN)

== Medal table ==
Rank	Nation	Gold	Silver	Bronze	Total
1	India (IND)	17	21	9	47
2	United States (USA)	12	14	13	39
3	Germany (GER)	12	8	11	31
4	Italy (ITA)	10	15	14	39
5	Czech Republic (CZE)	10	2	7	19
6	South Korea (KOR)	9	5	6	20
7	France (FRA)	8	7	7	22
8	Serbia (SRB)	7	1	2	10
9	Norway (NOR)	6	6	5	17
10	Slovakia (SVK)	5	2	4	11
11	Australia (AUS)	4	5	4	13
12	Croatia (CRO)	4	3	5	12
13	Spain (ESP)	3	3	3	9
14	Great Britain (GBR)	3	2	4	9
15	China (CHN)	3	2	2	7
16	Ukraine (UKR)	2	4	3	9
17	Greece (GRE)	2	3	3	8
18	Turkey (TUR)	2	2	2	6
19	Singapore (SGP)	2	1	4	7
20	Iran (IRI)	2	1	2	5
20	Kuwait (KUW)	2	1	2	5
22	Hungary (HUN)	1	5	5	11
23	Poland (POL)	1	1	5	7
24	Bulgaria (BUL)	1	1	2	4
25	Denmark (DEN)	1	1	1	3
26	Finland (FIN)	1	0	2	3
27	Austria (AUT)	1	0	1	2
27	Peru (PER)	1	0	1	2
29	Japan (JPN)	1	0	0	1
29	Slovenia (SLO)	1	0	0	1
31	Thailand (THA)	0	8	1	9
32	Puerto Rico (PUR)	0	2	1	3
33	Kazakhstan (KAZ)	0	1	4	5
34	Brazil (BRA)	0	1	2	3
34	Chinese Taipei (TPE)	0	1	2	3
34	Israel (ISR)	0	1	2	3
34	Romania (ROU)	0	1	2	3
38	Neutral athletes	0	1	1	2
39	Argentina (ARG)	0	1	0	1
39	Azerbaijan (AZE)	0	1	0	1
39	Guatemala (GUA)	0	1	0	1
39	Mexico (MEX)	0	1	0	1
39	Portugal (POR)	0	1	0	1
44	Switzerland (SUI)	0	0	2	2
45	Lebanon (LBN)	0	0	1	1
45	Uzbekistan (UZB)	0	0	1	1
Totals (46 entries)		134	137	148	419
