= Shooting at the 2018 Commonwealth Games – Women's trap =

Women's trap at the 2018 Commonwealth Games
- Venue: Belmont Shooting Centre, Brisbane
- Dates: 13 April
- Competitors: 14 from 10 nations

Medalists
gold medal	Laetisha Scanlan	Australia
silver medal	Kirsty Barr	Northern Ireland
bronze medal	Sarah Wixey	Wales

The Women's trap event at the 2018 Commonwealth Games was held on 13 April at the Belmont Shooting Centre, Brisbane.

== Results ==
=== Qualification ===
For the qualification stage, each athlete shoots at 75 targets. The top six shooters advanced to the final, with shoot-offs held to break ties if required.

Rank	Name	1	2	ex 50	3	Total	Notes
1	Sarah Wixey (WAL)	22	23	45	24	69; QS-off: +2	Q
2	Abbey Ling (ENG)	24	22	46	23	69; QS-off: +1	Q
3	Kirsty Barr (NIR)	25	21	46	23	69; QS-off: +0	Q
4	Shreyasi Singh (IND)	23	24	47	20	67; QS-off: +3	Q
5	Sharon Niven (SCO)	23	21	44	23	67; QS-off: +2	Q
6	Laetisha Scanlan (AUS)	23	22	45	21	66; QS-off: +8	Q
7	Natalie Rooney (NZL)	20	22	42	24	66; QS-off: +7	
8	Catherine Skinner (AUS)	23	21	44	20	64	
9	Ellie Seward (ENG)	21	22	43	20	63	
10	Georgia Konstantinidou (CYP)	22	21	43	20	63	
11	Seema Tomar (IND)	21	22	43	18	61	
12	Siti Mastura Rahim (SGP)	21	18	39	21	60	
13	Talotose Sioneholo (NIU)	9	11	20	12	32	
14	Kirsty Togiavalu (NIU)	7	13	20	6	26	

=== Final ===
The lowest-ranked shooters were eliminated after 25 / 30 / 35 / 40 shots, with qualification rankings used to break ties if required. The last two shooters were permitted 10 further shots each, plus a shoot-off in the event of a gold-medal tie.

Rank	Name	Series										Notes
Rank	Name	Stage 1 & ex 25	Stage 2	ex 30	Stage 3	ex 35	Stage 4	ex 40	Stage 5	ex 50	Total	Notes
1st place, gold medalist(s)	Laetisha Scanlan (AUS)	21	4	25	4	29	3	32	6	38	38	FGR
2nd place, silver medalist(s)	Kirsty Barr (NIR)	17	5	22	4	26	4	30	7	37	37	
3rd place, bronze medalist(s)	Sarah Wixey (WAL)	19	4	23	1	24	4	28	-	-	28	
4	Abbey Ling (ENG)	17	2	19	5	24	-	-	-	-	24	
5	Shreyasi Singh (IND)	17	2	19	-	-	-	-	-	-	19	
6	Sharon Niven (SCO)	14	-	-	-	-	-	-	-	-	14	
