= Shooting at the 2014 Commonwealth Games – Women's trap =

Shooting – Women's trap at the 2014 Commonwealth Games
- Venue: Barry Buddon Shooting Centre
- Dates: 28 July 2014
- Competitors: 17 from 11 nations
- Winning score: 13

Medalists
gold medal	Laetisha Scanlan	Australia
silver medal	Georgia Konstantinidou	Cyprus
bronze medal	Caroline Povey	England

The Women's trap event took place on 28 July 2014 at the Barry Buddon Shooting Centre. There was a qualification to determine the final participants.

== Results ==
=== Qualification ===
Rank	Name	1	2	3	Points	Notes
1	Catherine Skinner (AUS)	24	25	22	71	Q
2	Georgia Konstantinidou (CYP)	21	23	25	69	Q
3	Kirsty Barr (NIR)	23	23	23	69	Q
4	Natalie Rooney (NZL)	22	22	23	67	Q
5	Caroline Povey (ENG)	23	21	23	67	Q
6	Laetisha Scanlan (AUS)	20	23	23	66	Q
7	Shreyasi Singh (IND)	22	23	21	66	
8	Seema Tomar (IND)	21	22	22	65	
9	Susan Nattrass (CAN)	23	23	19	65	
10	Charlotte Kerwood (ENG)	22	20	22	64	
11	Sarah Wixey (WAL)	21	18	24	63	
12	Gaby Ahrens (NAM)	20	22	21	63	
13	Shona Marshall (SCO)	18	20	22	60	
14	Cynthia Meyer (CAN)	21	21	15	57	
15	Katie Cowell (WAL)	22	17	14	53	
16	Clemencia Sioneholo (NIU)	11	9	11	31	
17	Kirsty Togiavalu (NIU)	10	6	8	24	

=== Semifinals ===
Rank	Name	Points	Notes
1	Laetisha Scanlan (AUS)	14	QG
2	Georgia Konstantinidou (CYP)	12	QG
3	Caroline Povey (ENG)	11	QB
4	Natalie Rooney (NZL)	9	QB
5	Catherine Skinner (AUS)	9	
6	Kirsty Barr (NIR)	9	

QB: Qualified to Bronze

QG: Qualified to Gold

=== Finals ===
Rank	Name	Points	Notes
1st place, gold medalist(s)	Laetisha Scanlan (AUS)	13	
2nd place, silver medalist(s)	Georgia Konstantinidou (CYP)	12	
3rd place, bronze medalist(s)	Caroline Povey (ENG)	12	
4	Natalie Rooney (NZL)	12	
