= Shooting at the 2016 Summer Olympics – Women's trap =

Women's trap at the Games of the XXXI Olympiad
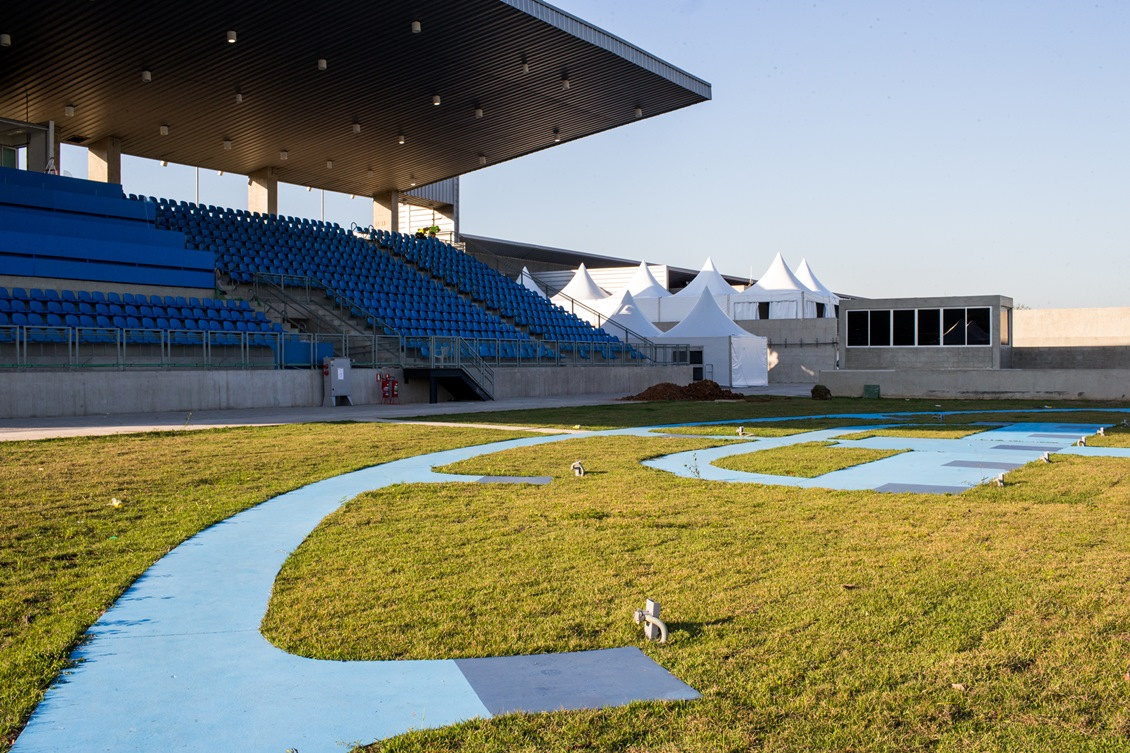
- View of the outdoor field at the National Shooting Center, where the Women's trap took place.
- Venue: National Shooting Center
- Date: 7 August 2016
- Competitors: 21 from 17 nations
- Winning score: 12/15 (in the gold medal match)

Medalists
1st place, gold medalist(s)		Catherine Skinner	Australia
2nd place, silver medalist(s)		Natalie Rooney	New Zealand
3rd place, bronze medalist(s)		Corey Cogdell	United States

The women's trap event at the 2016 Olympic Games took place on 7 August 2016 at the National Shooting Center.

== Competition format ==
The event consisted of two rounds: a qualifier and a final. In the qualifier, each shooter fired 3 sets of 25 targets in trap shooting, with 10 targets being thrown to the left, 10 to the right, and 5 straight-away in each set. The shooters could take two shots at each target.

The top 6 shooters in the qualifying round moved on to the semifinal round. There, they fired one round of 15 targets, where only one shot could be taken at each target. Best 2 in the semifinal round advance to gold medal match, while 3rd and 4th advance to bronze medal match. The medal match is an additional round of 15 targets.

Ties are broken using a shoot-off; additional shots are fired one at a time until there is no longer a tie.

The medals were presented by Sam Ramsamy, IOC member, South Africa and Medhat Wahdan, Honorary Member and Technical Delegates of the International Shooting Sport Federation.

== Records ==
Prior to this competition, the existing world and Olympic records were as follows.

Qualification records
World record	Jessica Rossi (ITA); Corey Cogdell (USA)	75	London, United Kingdom; Granada, Spain	4 August 2012; 5 July 2013
Olympic record	Jessica Rossi (ITA)	75	London, United Kingdom	4 August 2012

== Qualification round ==
Rank	Athlete	Country	1	2	3	Shoot-off	Total	Notes
1	Laetisha Scanlan	Australia	22	25	23		70	Q
2	Jessica Rossi	Italy	24	21	24		69	Q
3	Fátima Gálvez	Spain	24	22	23		69	Q
4	Natalie Rooney	New Zealand	24	23	21		68	Q
5	Corey Cogdell	United States	22	23	22		68	Q
6	Catherine Skinner	Australia	22	21	24	+2	67	Q
7	Cynthia Meyer	Canada	21	23	23	+1	67	
8	Mariya Dmitriyenko	Kazakhstan	24	20	22		66	
9	Gaby Ahrens	Namibia	23	22	21		66	
10	Satu Mäkelä-Nummela	Finland	22	24	20		66	
11	Ekaterina Rabaya	Russia	22	20	23		65	
12	Pak Yong-hui	North Korea	23	20	22		65	
13	Arianna Perilli	San Marino	21	23	21		65	
14	Ray Bassil	Lebanon	23	22	20		65	
15	Chen Fang	China	23	21	20		64	
16	Alessandra Perilli	San Marino	22	22	19		63	
17	Lin Yi-chun	Chinese Taipei	22	20	20		62	
18	Tatiana Barsuk	Russia	21	22	19		62	
19	Jana Beckmann	Germany	20	20	21		61	
20	Yukie Nakayama	Japan	19	22	20		61	
21	Janice Teixeira	Brazil	22	21	17		60	

== Semifinal ==
Rank	Athlete	Country	Total	Shoot-off	Notes
1	Catherine Skinner	Australia	14		Gold Medal Match
2	Natalie Rooney	New Zealand	13	+1	Gold Medal Match
3	Corey Cogdell	United States	13	+0	Bronze Medal Match
4	Fátima Gálvez	Spain	12		Bronze Medal Match
5	Laetisha Scanlan	Australia	10		
6	Jessica Rossi	Italy	10		

== Final (medal matches) ==
Rank	Athlete	Country	Total	Shoot-off	Notes
1st place, gold medalist(s)	Catherine Skinner	Australia	12		
2nd place, silver medalist(s)	Natalie Rooney	New Zealand	11		
3rd place, bronze medalist(s)	Corey Cogdell	United States	13	+1	
4	Fátima Gálvez	Spain	13	+0	
