= Bhowneesh Mendiratta =

Indian sport shooter

Personal information
- Born: June 30, 1999 (age 26) Faridabad, Haryana, India
- Education: Delhi University
- Height: 1.78 m (5 ft 10 in)

Sport
- Sport: Shooting
- Event: Trap
Medal record
Men's trap shooting
Representing India
World Cup
Silver medal – second place	2022 Changwon	Trap team
Asian Championships
Silver medal – second place	2025 Shymkent	Trap
Junior Asian Championships
Silver medal – second place	2019 Doha	Trap

Bhowneesh Mendiratta (born 30 June 1999) is an Indian trap shooter.

== Early life and education ==
He graduated from the Delhi Public School, Faridabad in 2017. He went on to study at the Delhi University.

== Career ==
He started with double trap shooting, but gave it in favour of trap after double trap was dropped as an Olympic event.

He was part of the team that won a silver medal at the trap competition at the 2022 ISSF World Cup.

By finishing fourth at the 2022 World Shotgun Championships in the men's trap competition, he won the first Indian quota for the Paris Olympics.
