= Ekaterina Rabaya =

Russian sports shooter

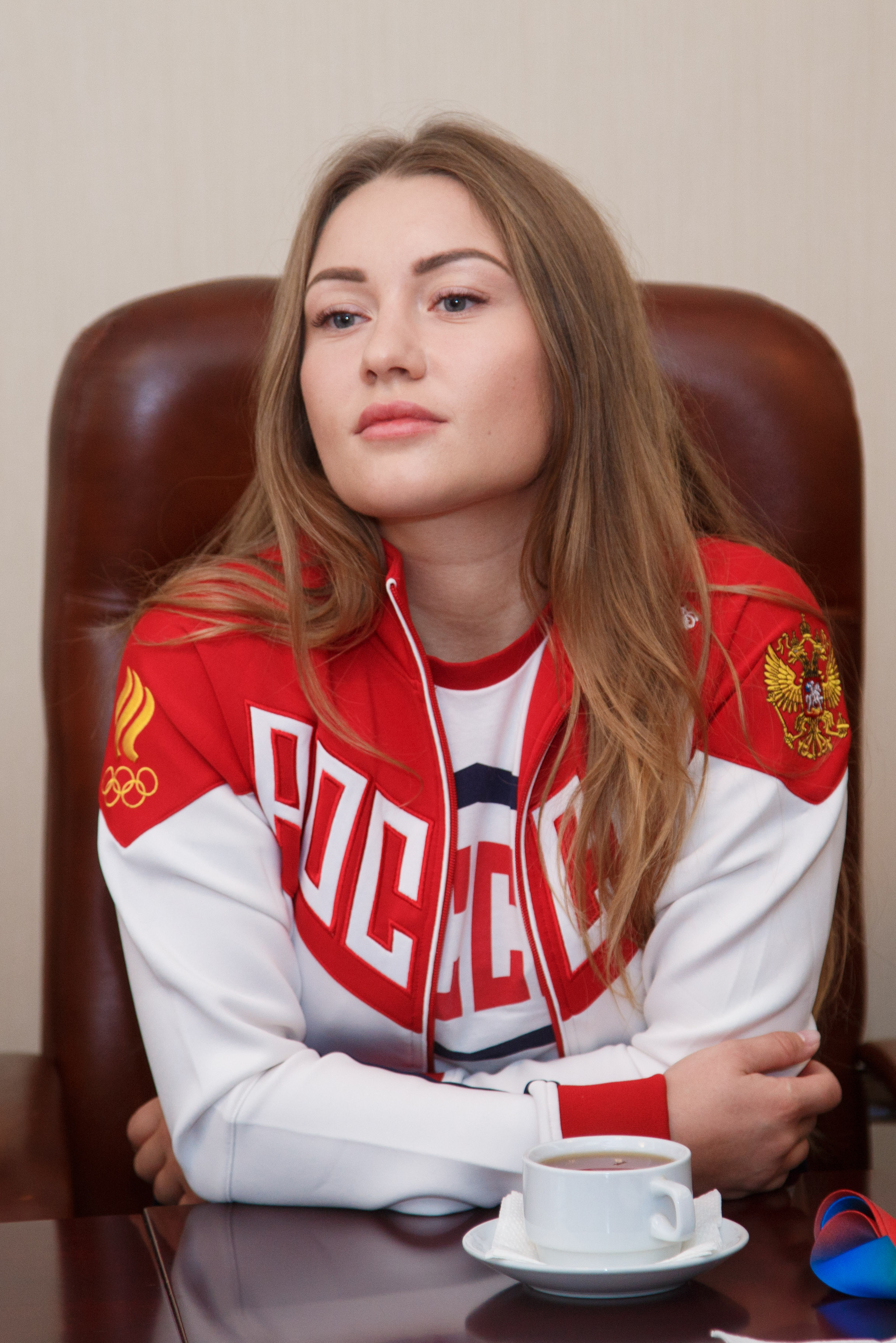
- Rabaya in 2017

Personal information
- Nationality: Russian
- Born: 6 November 1993 (age 32) Tula, Russia
- Height: 1.60 m (5 ft 3 in)
- Weight: 49 kg (108 lb)

Sport
- Country: Russia
- Sport: Sports shooting
- Event: Trap shooting
- Club: Sviyaga
Medal record
World Championships
| Silver medal – second place | 2018 Changwon | Trap mixed team |

Ekaterina Rabaya (born 6 November 1993) is a Russian sports shooter. She competed in the women's trap event at the 2016 Summer Olympics.
