= Shooting at the 2022 Asian Games – Men's 50 metre rifle three positions team =

Men's 50 metre rifle 3 positions team at the 2022 Asian Games
- Venue: Fuyang Yinhu Sports Centre
- Dates: 29 September 2023
- Competitors: 42 from 14 nations

Medalists
| gold medal | India; Swapnil Kusale, Akhil Sheoran, Aishwary Pratap Singh Tomar |
| silver medal | China; Du Linshu, Tian Jiaming, Yu Hao |
| bronze medal | South Korea; Kim Jong-hyun, Kim Sang-do, Mo Dai-seong |

The men's 50 metre rifle three positions team competition at the 2022 Asian Games in Hangzhou, China was held on 29 September 2023 at Fuyang Yinhu Sports Centre.

== Schedule ==
All times are China Standard Time (UTC+08:00)

| Date | Time | Event |
|---|---|---|
| Friday, 29 September 2023 | 09:00 | Final |

== Records ==
Prior to this competition, the existing world, Asian and Games records were as follows.

| World Record | United States | 1761 | Lima, Peru | 12 November 2022 |
| Asian Record | India | 1750 | Baku, Azerbaijan | 20 August 2023 |
| Games Record | — | — | — | — |

== Results ==
| Rank | Team | Kneeling | | Prone | | Standing | | Total | Xs | Notes |
| Rank | Team | 1 | 2 | 1 | 2 | 1 | 2 | Total | Xs | Notes |
|---|---|---|---|---|---|---|---|---|---|---|
| 1st place, gold medalist(s) | India (IND) | 292 | 297 | 296 | 297 | 295 | 292 | 1769 | 90 | WR |
| | Swapnil Kusale | 98 | 98 | 100 | 99 | 99 | 97 | 591 | 33 | |
| | Akhil Sheoran | 95 | 99 | 98 | 99 | 98 | 98 | 587 | 30 | |
| | Aishwary Pratap Singh Tomar | 99 | 100 | 98 | 99 | 98 | 97 | 591 | 27 | |
| 2nd place, silver medalist(s) | China (CHN) | 290 | 296 | 299 | 299 | 291 | 288 | 1763 | 104 | |
| | Du Linshu | 98 | 100 | 100 | 99 | 96 | 97 | 590 | 34 | |
| | Tian Jiaming | 97 | 98 | 99 | 100 | 99 | 96 | 589 | 40 | |
| | Yu Hao | 95 | 98 | 100 | 100 | 96 | 95 | 584 | 30 | |
| 3rd place, bronze medalist(s) | South Korea (KOR) | 290 | 294 | 293 | 296 | 288 | 287 | 1748 | 83 | |
| | Kim Jong-hyun | 98 | 98 | 98 | 99 | 97 | 97 | 587 | 27 | |
| | Kim Sang-do | 97 | 99 | 98 | 99 | 97 | 95 | 585 | 28 | |
| | Mo Dai-seong | 95 | 97 | 97 | 98 | 94 | 95 | 576 | 28 | |
| 4 | Kazakhstan (KAZ) | 290 | 295 | 296 | 296 | 286 | 282 | 1745 | 82 | |
| | Konstantin Malinovskiy | 97 | 98 | 98 | 98 | 98 | 95 | 584 | 28 | |
| | Islam Satpayev | 93 | 100 | 99 | 100 | 94 | 94 | 580 | 29 | |
| | Yuriy Yurkov | 100 | 97 | 99 | 98 | 94 | 93 | 581 | 25 | |
| 5 | Iran (IRI) | 287 | 287 | 297 | 293 | 287 | 289 | 1740 | 78 | |
| | Amir Mohammad Nekounam | 91 | 94 | 97 | 98 | 99 | 95 | 574 | 26 | |
| | Pouria Norouzian | 99 | 96 | 100 | 98 | 94 | 97 | 584 | 32 | |
| | Mahyar Sedaghat | 97 | 97 | 100 | 97 | 94 | 97 | 582 | 20 | |
| 6 | Thailand (THA) | 290 | 284 | 291 | 293 | 284 | 287 | 1729 | 71 | |
| | Patsugree Sriwichai | 96 | 96 | 96 | 95 | 93 | 93 | 569 | 20 | |
| | Napis Tortungpanich | 97 | 96 | 98 | 100 | 94 | 98 | 583 | 28 | |
| | Thongphaphum Vongsukdee | 97 | 92 | 97 | 98 | 97 | 96 | 577 | 23 | |
| 7 | Japan (JPN) | 284 | 280 | 291 | 295 | 289 | 285 | 1724 | 71 | |
| | Masaya Endo | 96 | 94 | 100 | 97 | 96 | 97 | 580 | 31 | |
| | Atsushi Shimada | 96 | 95 | 96 | 100 | 95 | 93 | 575 | 21 | |
| | Akihito Shimizu | 92 | 91 | 95 | 98 | 98 | 95 | 569 | 19 | |
| 8 | Indonesia (INA) | 286 | 287 | 293 | 296 | 280 | 281 | 1723 | 68 | |
| | Fathur Gustafian | 94 | 95 | 97 | 96 | 97 | 95 | 574 | 25 | |
| | Trisnarmanto | 95 | 95 | 96 | 100 | 94 | 91 | 571 | 23 | |
| | Davin Rosyiid Wibowo | 97 | 97 | 100 | 100 | 89 | 95 | 578 | 20 | |
| 9 | Oman (OMA) | 285 | 290 | 292 | 293 | 274 | 283 | 1717 | 72 | |
| | Issam Al-Balushi | 94 | 96 | 97 | 98 | 95 | 94 | 574 | 24 | |
| | Hamed Al-Khatri | 96 | 98 | 99 | 97 | 91 | 93 | 574 | 25 | |
| | Ibrahim Al-Muqbali | 95 | 96 | 96 | 98 | 88 | 96 | 569 | 23 | |
| 10 | Pakistan (PAK) | 283 | 289 | 291 | 292 | 279 | 281 | 1715 | 57 | |
| | Ghufran Adil | 96 | 96 | 99 | 98 | 93 | 94 | 576 | 18 | |
| | Zeeshan Farid | 89 | 97 | 95 | 96 | 94 | 92 | 563 | 19 | |
| | Aqib Latif | 98 | 96 | 97 | 98 | 92 | 95 | 576 | 20 | |
| 11 | Mongolia (MGL) | 286 | 280 | 293 | 298 | 282 | 275 | 1714 | 68 | |
| | Nyantain Bayaraa | 98 | 91 | 99 | 100 | 97 | 96 | 581 | 30 | |
| | Batbayaryn Erkhembayar | 95 | 97 | 98 | 100 | 93 | 93 | 576 | 21 | |
| | Tsedevdorjiin Mönkh-Erdene | 93 | 92 | 96 | 98 | 92 | 86 | 557 | 17 | |
| 12 | Bahrain (BRN) | 282 | 286 | 288 | 292 | 285 | 278 | 1711 | 54 | |
| | Husain Abduljabbar | 95 | 95 | 93 | 99 | 92 | 92 | 566 | 13 | |
| | Khaled Mohamed Al-Doseri | 92 | 94 | 96 | 95 | 99 | 96 | 572 | 25 | |
| | Mahmood Haji | 95 | 97 | 99 | 98 | 94 | 90 | 573 | 16 | |
| 13 | Kuwait (KUW) | 288 | 290 | 288 | 296 | 269 | 277 | 1708 | 54 | |
| | Abdullah Al-Harbi | 95 | 95 | 96 | 97 | 90 | 93 | 566 | 14 | |
| | Khaled Al-Majed | 95 | 98 | 97 | 100 | 90 | 91 | 571 | 23 | |
| | Turki Al-Shemari | 98 | 97 | 95 | 99 | 89 | 93 | 571 | 17 | |
| 14 | Bangladesh (BAN) | 283 | 285 | 292 | 292 | 278 | 275 | 1705 | 51 | |
| | Abdullah Hel Baki | 95 | 95 | 98 | 99 | 93 | 90 | 570 | 19 | |
| | Shovon Chowdhury | 95 | 94 | 98 | 96 | 91 | 90 | 564 | 15 | |
| | Robiul Islam | 93 | 96 | 96 | 97 | 94 | 95 | 571 | 17 | |
