= Natalie Rooney =

New Zealand sport shooter

Personal information
- Full name: Natalie Ellen Rooney
- Born: 1 June 1988 (age 38) Timaru, New Zealand
- Height: 1.81 m (5 ft 11 in)

Sport
- Sport: Sport shooting
Medal record
Women's shooting
Representing New Zealand
Olympic Games
| Silver medal – second place | 2016 Rio de Janeiro | Trap |
Commonwealth Championships
| Bronze medal – third place | 2017 Brisbane | Trap |

Natalie Ellen Rooney (born 1 June 1988) is a New Zealand sport shooter, competing primarily in trap shooting events.

Rooney is from Waimate in South Canterbury. Her father is Gary Rooney, a prominent businessman involved in earthmoving and irrigation. Her mother, Adrienne Rooney, died in 2013. Rooney attended Waituna Creek School and Waimate High School, before boarding at Craighead Diocesan School in Timaru. Sport runs in her family: her father has represented New Zealand in shooting, her younger brothers Cameron and William represented the country in junior shooting competitions, her older brother Sam was the first who started clay shooting, and her mother was a junior basketball representative.

The New Zealand Shooting Federation nominated her for the country's sole quota spot at the 2012 Summer Olympics, but Ryan Taylor appealed the decision to the New Zealand Sports Tribunal and was sent instead. She competed in the women's trap event at the 2016 Summer Olympics and won the silver medal, with gold going to Australia's Catherine Skinner. She was only the second New Zealand sports shooter to win an Olympic medal, the first being Ian Ballinger who won bronze in the small-bore rifle at the 1968 Summer Olympics.

== International competitions ==
| Year | Competition | Venue | Position | Event | Notes |
|---|---|---|---|---|---|
| 2010 | Commonwealth Games | Delhi, India | 5th | Trap singles | |
| 2014 | Commonwealth Games | Glasgow, Scotland | 4th | Trap | |
| 2016 | Olympic Games | Rio de Janeiro, Brazil | 2nd | Trap | |
