= Swapnil Kusale =

Indian sport shooter (born 1987)

Swapnil Kusale OLY
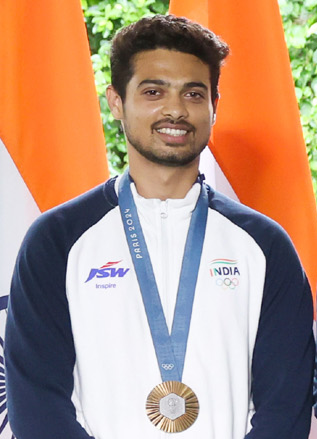
- Kusale in 2024

Personal information
- Nationality: Indian
- Born: 6 August 1995 (age 31) Kambalwadi, Kolhapur, Maharashtra, India
- Years active: 2012–present
- Employer: Indian Railways

Sport
- Sport: Shooting
- Event: 50 meter rifle three positions
- Coached by: Deepali Deshpande

Achievements and titles
- Olympic finals: (bronze) x1
- World finals: (gold) x2 (silver) x2 (bronze) x1
- Regional finals: (gold) x2 (silver) x1
- Personal bests: 591 AGR (2023)
Medal record
Men's shooting
Representing India
Event	1st	2nd	3rd
Olympic Games	0	0	1
World Championships	0	0	1
World Cup	2	2	0
Asian Games	1	0	0
Asian Championships	1	1	0
Commonwealth Championships	0	0	1
Total	4	3	3
Olympic Games
Bronze medal – third place	2024 Paris	50 m rifle 3 positions
World Championships
Bronze medal – third place	2022 Cairo	50 m rifle 3 positions team
World Cup
Gold medal – first place	2021 New Delhi	50 m rifle 3 positions team
Gold medal – first place	2022 Baku	50 m rifle 3 positions mixed team
Silver medal – second place	2022 Baku	50 m rifle 3 positions team
Silver medal – second place	2022 Baku	50 m rifle 3 positions
Asian Games
Gold medal – first place	2022 Hangzhou	50 m rifle 3 positions team
Asian Championships
Gold medal – first place	2024 Jakarta	50 m rifle 3 positions team
Silver medal – second place	2023 Changwon	50 m rifle 3 positions team
Commonwealth Championships
Bronze medal – third place	2017 Brisbane	50 m rifle prone

Swapnil Kusale (born 6 August 1995) is an Indian sport shooter. He won the bronze medal at the 2024 Summer Olympics in the men's 50 metre rifle three positions event.

== Early life ==
Kusale was born on 6 August 1995, in Kambalwadi village in Kolhapur district. In 2009, his father enrolled him into Maharashtra government's Krida Prabhodini sports programme. After one year of intense physical training, Kusale had to choose one sport and ended up choosing shooting. In 2015, he became a ticket collector for the Indian Railways in Pune, which helped him buy his first rifle.

== Shooting career ==
In 2015, he won gold in 50m rifle prone 3 in the junior category in 2015 Asian Shooting Championships in Kuwait. In the same year, he also won the 59th National Shooting Championship held in Tughlakabad ahead of Gagan Narang and Chain Singh in 50m rifle prone event. In 2017, he repeated the same performance in 61st National Championship in Thiruvananthapuram by winning a gold in 50m rifle 3 position.

In October 2022, he earned an Olympic quota berth for India in the men's 50-metre rifle 3 position event with a fourth-place finish at the 2022 ISSF World Shooting Championships in Cairo. In May 2024, he was selected in the Indian Olympic team in the 50m rifle 3 positions event after the trials in Delhi and Bhopal. Despite finishing 5th in the final trial, Kusale was selected in the team as the second shooter based on his scores in the first three trials.

At the 2024 Olympics, Kusale became the first Indian to qualify for the final of the men's 50 metre rifle three positions event, and won the bronze medal with a score of 451.4 in the final.

== Career outside shooting ==
He joined Central Railway in 2015 as a Travelling Ticket Examiner. He was requesting for a promotion for years. Post his bronze medal-winning achievement, he was given a double promotion and has been promoted to the post of Officer on Special Duty, Sports Cell in Mumbai.

== Awards and nominations ==
Year	Award	Category	Result	Ref.
2024	Indian Sports Honours	Sportsman of the Year	Nominated	
2025	Times of India Sports Awards	Shooter of the Year Male	Won	
