= Caroline Povey =

British sport shooter (born 1980)

Personal information
- Nationality: United Kingdom
- Born: 1 June 1980 (age 46) Chesterfield, England
- Height: 5 ft 4 in (163 cm)
- Weight: 67 kg (148 lb)

Sport
- Country: England
- Sport: Sport shooter
Medal record
Representing England
Women's shooting
Commonwealth Games
Bronze medal – third place	2014 Glasgow	Women's trap
- Updated on 7 September 2014

Caroline Povey (born 1 June 1980) is a British sport shooter. She competed for England in the women's trap event at the 2014 Commonwealth Games where she won a bronze medal.
