= Georgia Konstantinidou =

Cypriot sport shooter (born 1984)

Personal information
- Nationality: Cypriot
- Born: 29 January 1984 (age 42) Limassol, Cyprus

Sport
- Country: Cyprus
- Sport: Sport shooter
Medal record
Representing Cyprus
Women's shooting
Commonwealth Games
| Silver medal – second place | 2014 Glasgow | Women's trap |
Games of the Small States of Europe
| Bronze medal – third place | 2025 Andorra la Vella | Women's Trap |
- Updated on 4 October 2014

Georgia Konstantinidou (Greek: Γεωργία Κωνσταντινίδου; born 29 January 1984) is a Cypriot sport shooter. She competed in the women's trap event at the 2014 Commonwealth Games where she won a silver medal.
