= Phillip Jungman =

American sport shooter

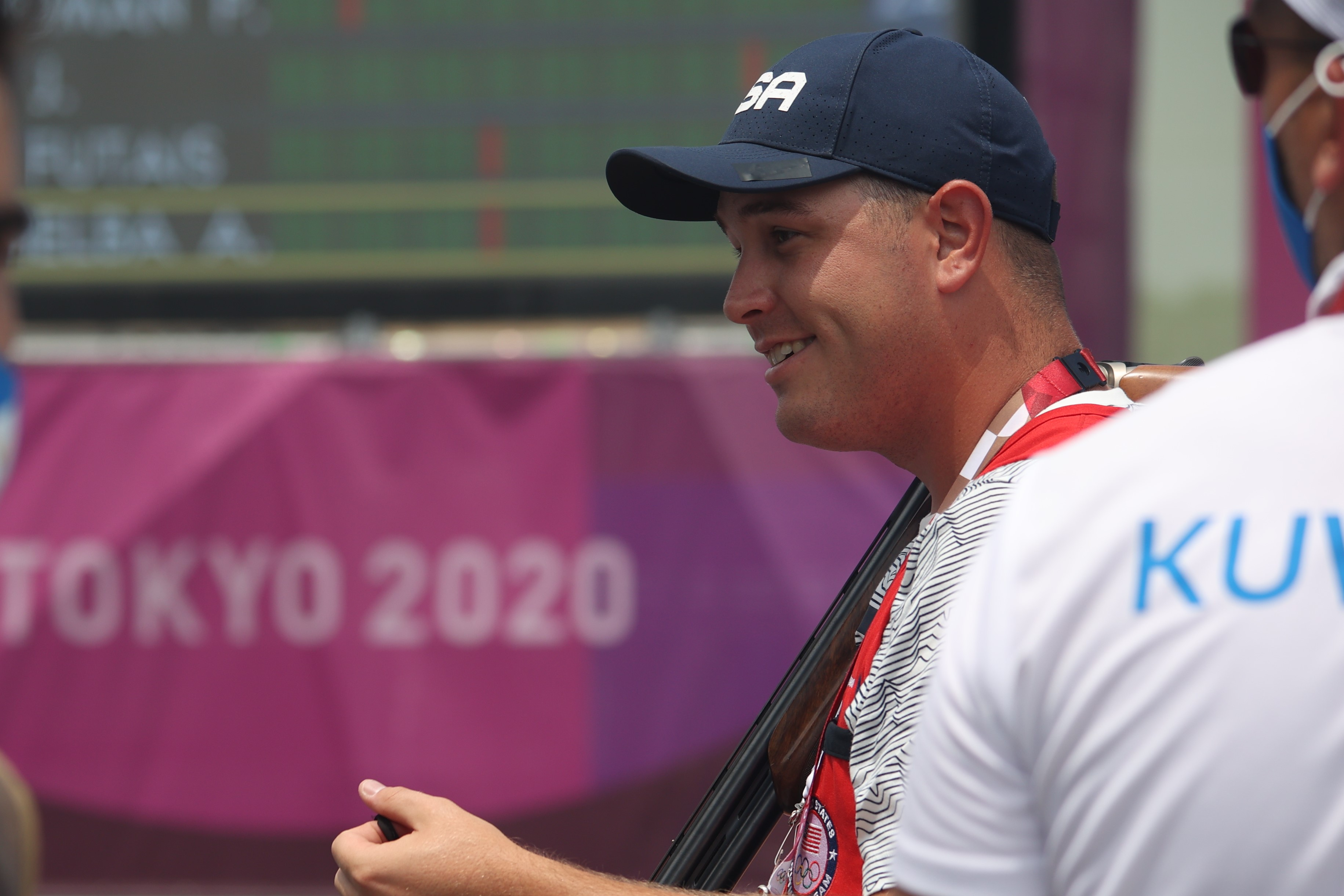
- Phillip Jungman competing in men’s skeet at the 2020 Summer Olympic Games

Personal information
- Nationality: American
- Born: June 11, 1995 (age 31) Bryan, Texas, US
- Spouse: Rebecca Lewis Jungman (2018)

Sport
- Sport: Shooting

Phillip Russell Jungman (born June 11, 1995) is an American sport shooter. He represented the United States at the 2020 Summer Olympics in Tokyo where he placed 15th with a score of 120 targets out of a possible 125. His notable accomplishments include: National Champion in 2016, Rio de Janeiro Olympic Alternate, Fourth place finish at 2019 Pan American Games.

Jungman is a staff sergeant in the United States Army. He is a competitive shooter/instructor for the shotgun team of the Army Marksmanship Unit.
