= Kirsty Barr =

Northern Irish trap shooter

Personal information
- Nationality: British
- Born: Kirsty Barr; 12 September 1988 (age 38) Craigavon, Northern Ireland
- Occupation: Aerospace engineer

Sport
- Sport: Clay pigeon shooting
- Event: Trap shooting
- Club: Thatch Clay Target Club
Medal record
Women's shooting
Representing Great Britain
World Championships
Bronze medal – third place	2018 Changwon	Mixed trap pairs
European Championships
Silver medal – second place	2018 Leobersdorf	Trap
Representing Northern Ireland
Commonwealth Games
Silver medal – second place	2018 Gold Coast	Trap

Kirsty Hegarty (née Barr; born 12 September 1988) is a British trap shooter from Northern Ireland.

== Early life ==
Kirsty Barr was born in Craigavon, County Armagh in 1988, the daughter of shooters Clifford and Sandra Barr.

Kirsty attended Ballymena Academy, County Antrim and is an alumna of Queens University, Belfast, where she studied Aerospace Engineering.

== Career ==
At the Commonwealth Shooting Championships (CSF) 2010, a test event for the Commonwealth Games, Kirsty secured her first international gold medal.

At the 2010 Commonwealth Games Barr finished 17th in trap, and 4th in the pairs trap. At the 2010 ISSF World Shooting Championships she finished 34th.

At the 2014 Commonwealth Games Barr finished 6th in the trap. At the 2014 ISSF World Shooting Championships she was 22nd. At the 2015 World Shotgun Championships she was 11th and at the 2017 World Shotgun Championships she was 13th.

As part of the Great Britain Shooting team, British Shooting Kirsty Barr alongside teammates Abbey Burton and Charlotte Kerwood won team Gold at the 2015 World Shotgun Championships, Lonato.

In 2016 Barr qualified for her first ISSF final in Baku, scoring 71ex75 in qualification. Barr finished 6th in the final.

Barr won a silver medal at the 2018 Commonwealth Games in the women's trap event.

Also in 2018, Barr continued her success to win Silver in the European Championships in the women's trap. And in the team event was part of the GB ladies team that finished 4th losing out to Finland who secured the bronze medal.

In the 2018 ISSF World Shooting Championships in South Korea, Kirsty along with shooting partner Aaron Heading, fought their way to a bronze medal in the Mixed Team Trap event losing Silver to Russia on back number and missing out on a quota place for the 2020 Olympics in Tokyo.

In 2019 Barr, along with Matthew Coward-Holley, won a Bronze in the Mixed Team Trap event in Acapulco, Mexico.

Barr's form continued into the Al Ain stage of the 2019 ISSF World Cup where she secured silver medal and an Olympic Quota Place for Team GB for the 2020 Olympics. On 13 January 2021 Team GB announced Hegarty would be competing in the delayed Tokyo 2020 Olympic Games. Hegarty was the first confirmed Northern Ireland Olympian for the 2020 games.

While not on the range Kirsty is an Aerospace Engineer for Bombardier Aerospace, Shorts based in Belfast.

== Personal life ==
Kirsty Barr is an aerospace engineer.

In September 2016 Kirsty married Stephen Hegarty from Donegal Town.
