= Aeriel Skinner =

American sport shooter

Personal information
- Full name: Aeriel Alease Skinner
- Born: December 20, 1994 (age 31) Lodi, United States
- Height: 1.67 m (5 ft 6 in)
- Weight: 77 kg (170 lb)

Sport
- Country: United States
- Sport: Shooting
- Event: Trap
Medal record
World Championships
Bronze medal – third place	2018 Changwon	Trap team

Aeriel Alease Skinner (born December 20, 1994) is an American sport shooter.

She participated at the 2018 ISSF World Shooting Championships, winning a medal.
