= Luis Bermudez =

American ceramicist and sculptor

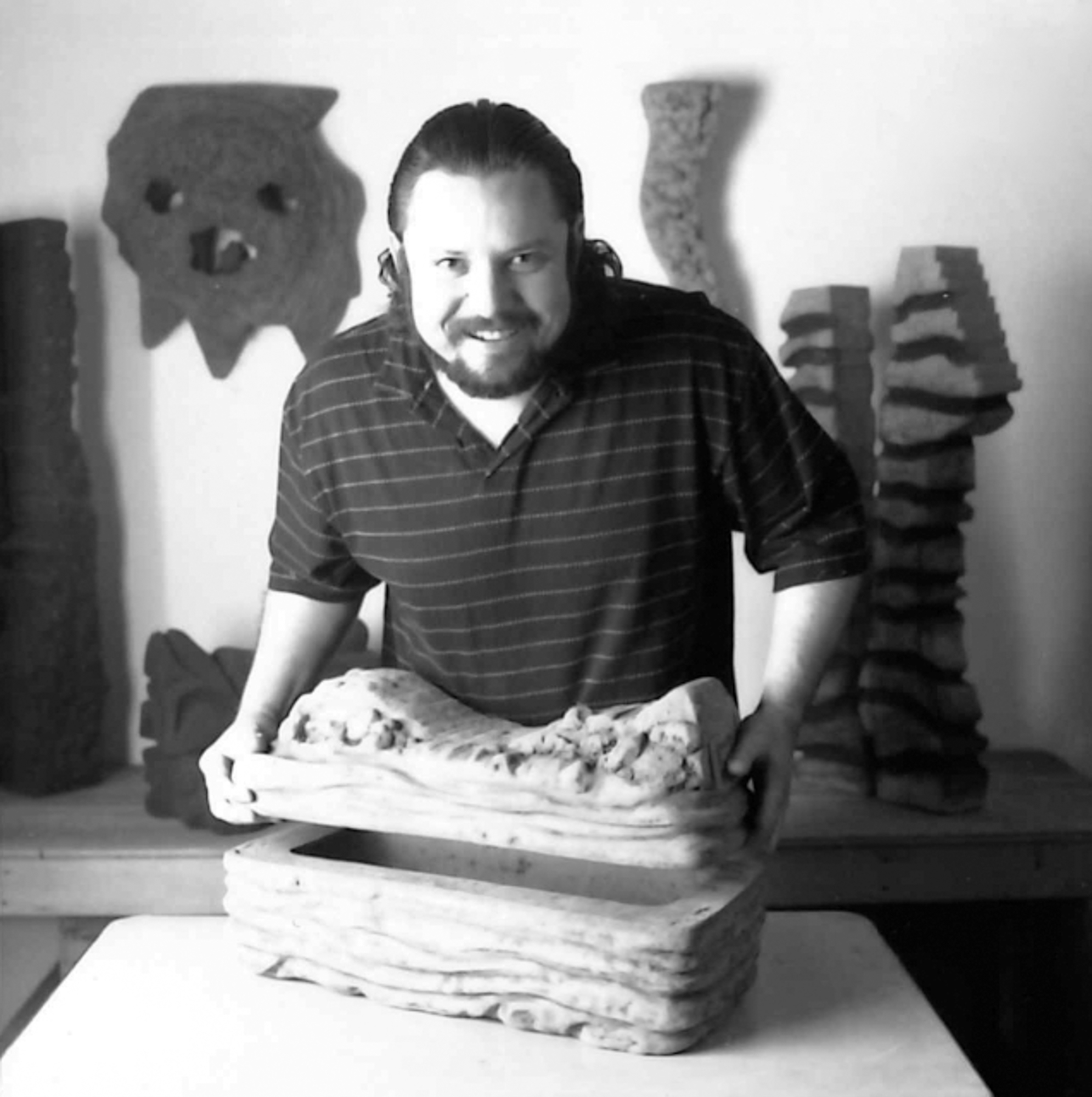
- Luis Bermudez in his Los Angeles studio.
- Born: Los Angeles, California, U.S.
- Died: 2021; Los Angeles, California
- Education: Bachelor of Arts at California State University, Northridge (1976), Master of Arts (1978) Master of Fine Arts at University of California, Los Angeles (1980)
- Known for: Sculpture, ceramics
- Partner: Karyn Craven
- Awards: National Endowment for the Arts Visual Artists Fellowship (1988) Chancellor’s Patent Fund Grant, University of California, Los Angeles (1980)
- Website: https://www.luisbermudez.com/

Luis Apolinario Bermudez (d. 2021) was a Los Angeles-based ceramicist, sculptor, and arts educator of Mexican descent. He created his own glazes and a formula for castable refractory and invented mold-making techniques, which he passed on to the students he mentored at UCLA, Otis College of Art and Design, Cal State Northridge and Cal State Los Angeles. Bermudez's work reflects pre-Columbian iconography and symbolism. His works are included in numerous public collections, including the Hammer Museum in Los Angeles and the Los Angeles County Museum of Art.

== Early life and education ==
Luis Bermudez was born and raised in Los Angeles, California. His parents immigrated from Mexico to the United States of America. Bermudez made frequent visits to his family owned ranch called El Piño in Guadalajara, Jalisco, Mexico during his youth which inspired pre-Columbian iconography shown in his work. Bermudez spent much of his time with the foreman's children and it was during this time he searched for a sense of belonging. Feeling as though he did not belong to just Los Angeles or Mexico but to both, Bermudez stated "It is from this sense of not belonging yet being connected to it all that I operate both as a human being and an artist."

Bermudez attended California State University, Northridge where he received his B.A. in 1976 and then his M.A in 1978. He received his M.F.A. from the University of California, Los Angeles in 1980. Bermudez was a professor of ceramic art, sculpture, and visual arts at California State University, Los Angeles for 20 years.

== Works ==
Bermudez's work was inspired by nature and his travels to "sacred places" around the world such Iceland, French Polynesia, and Peru where people made offerings to deities. Bermudez's work reflects what he described as the "essence" of his personal experience at these locations and is reflected in his imagery of juxtaposing and chaotic geologic/landscape surface textures such as cenotes, glaciers, and marae.

Included in his work are "architectonic references of stairs that are usually too hard to climb". Bermudez used this representation as a direct reference to the pyramids in Teotihuacán, Mexico invoking thoughts of climbing or seeking. In his work, Bermudez also referenced windows, portals, or doorways in association with death and "the metaphorical expression" of reflection and the thought changing processes.

As a ceramicist, he worked within the context of the California Clay Movement. He exhibited alongside ceramic artists including Richard De Vore, Peter Shire, Dora De Larios, Paul Soldner, Ken Price, John Mason, and Peter Voulkos.

== Sobre La Vida ==
Sobre La Vida which translates to "About Life" was a celebration and tribute to Luis Bermudez and his artwork. The exhibit featured artworks created between 1986 and 2014. Themes of the show included the interconnected nature of the place, identity, materiality, and the relation between the physical and the spiritual.

== Included works ==
- La Caja Series- Bermudez combined positive and negative elements in an effort to invoke tension and failed desires.
- Vulnerable Offerings and Ultimate Offering is a series of unglazed porcelain bowls atop winding reptilian bodies similar to pre-Columbian iconography and religious objects used in rituals.
- Sacred Places and Runes Series Finding inspiration in both the natural world and his Mesoamerican heritage, Bermudez used his artwork as metaphors for non linear time and narrative, drawing inspiration from non-western philosophical traditions.

== Made in L.A. 2023: Acts of Living ==
Made in L.A. 2023: Acts of Living was an art exhibition held by the Hammer Museum showcasing artists work from across Los Angeles. Bermudez's estate entered works "spanning over four decades." Bermudez utilizes pre-Columbian iconography such as "snakes, lightning bolts, and certain vessel types."

== Recognition ==
Bermudez was recognized for his cultural projects, notably the UCLA Ceramics Invitational of 1992, and worked with the Consultante General of Mexico to present NEPANTLA Dreams: Cal-Mex States L.A. (2004–2005).

== Exhibitions ==
=== Solo exhibitions ===
- 2024: Luis Bermudez: Sobre la Vida, L.A. Louver, Venice, CA
- 2010-11: Luis Bermudez: Myth, Place and Identity, Beatrice Wood Center for the Arts, Ojai, CA
- 1986 Luis Bermudez, Garth Clark Gallery, Los Angeles, CA

=== Group exhibitions ===
- 2023: Made in LA 2023: Acts of Living, Hammer Museum, Los Angeles, CA
- 2016: Lineage: Mentorship and Learning, American Museum of Ceramic Art, Pomona, CA
- 2012; kilnopening.edu 2012: American Museum of Ceramic Art, Ojai, CA
- 2009: Cerámica de la Tierra- Pre-Columbian Tradition, American Museum of Ceramic Art, Pomona, CA
- 2006: Scripps College 62nd Ceramic Annual 2006, Ruth Chandler Williamson Gallery, Claremont, CA
- 1994: Four Sculptors, Jose Drudis-Biada Art Gallery, Mount St. Mary's College, Los Angeles, CA
- 1994: The World of Cups, The Armory Center for the Arts, Pasadena, CA
- 1993: Bridging the Differences: Nine Artists / Three Cultures, Korean Cultural Center, Los Angeles, CA
- 1993: Clay Currents: Contemporary Ceramic Sculpture from the Greater Los Angeles Area, Southwestern College Art Gallery
- 1993: Fiction, Function, Figuration: The 29th Ceramic National, Everson Museum of Art
- 1993: UCLA Onramps, Offramps: Exchange & Diversity, Lyceum Theatre Gallery
- 1992: Choice Encounters, Long Beach Museum of Art
- 1992: Sueños from California, University of Texas at El Paso, TX
- 1992: Transformed From Clay: 14 Southern California Artist, Armory Center for the Arts, Pasadena, CA
- 1991: Ceramic Sculpture, Pierce College Art Gallery, Woodland Hills, CA
- 1991: Ceramics, Couturier Gallery, Los Angeles, CA
- 1991: Recent Ceramics, Pepperdine University
- 1990: Common Ground: Distinct Journeys, Century Gallery, Sylmar, CA
- 1988: 5 In Clay, Los Angeles Municipal Art Gallery, Los Angeles, CA
- 1988: Up From L.A.: A Crafts Survey, Palo Alto Cultural Center, Palo Alto, CA
- 1986: Ceramic Annual, 1986 Galleries of the Claremont Colleges, Claremont, CA
- 1986: The City Terrace Sculpture Invitational, City Terrace Apartments, Los Angeles, CA
- 1986: Kindred Spirits, Los Angeles Municipal Art Gallery, Los Angeles, CA
- 1986: Magic: Eventual Transformation, Reflections Gallery, La Mesa, CA
- 1986: Reaching the Summit: Mountain Landscapes in Southern California 1900-1986, Laguna Art Museum, Laguna Beach, CA
- 1986: Teaching Artists: The UCLA Faculty of Art & Design, UCLA Wight Art Gallery, Los Angeles, CA
- 1985: Pacific Connections, Los Angeles Institute of Contemporary Art
- 1985: Perspectives 1985, CSU Northridge Art Gallery, Northridge, CA
- 1985:Luis Bermudez, Joseph Mannino, Steve Rogers: An Exhibition of Architectural Ceramic Sculpture, The USC Atelier, Santa Monica, CA
- 1984: Art in Clay: 1950’s to 1980’s in Southern California, Los Angeles Municipal Art Gallery,
- 1984: Clay Structures/Environmental Sources, CSU Dominguez Hills University Art Gallery, Carson, CA
- 1978: Young Americans: Clay/Glass, Tucson Museum of Art, Tucson, AZ; Museum of Contemporary Crafts, New York, NY
- 1977 CALIFORNIA CRAFTS X, E.B. Crocker Art Gallery, Sacramento, California

=== Exhibitions curated ===
- 1993: UCLA Onramps, Offramps: Exchange & Diversity, Lyceum Theatre Gallery
- 1991: UCLA Ceramics Invitational: 1971–1991, Century Gallery

== Awards ==
- 1988: National Endowment for the Arts Visual Artists Fellowship Grant
- 1980: Chancellor's Patent Fund Grant, University of California, Los Angeles
