= Sarah Wixey =

Welsh sport shooter

Personal information
- Nationality: Welsh
- Born: 10 June 1970 (age 56)

Sport
- Sport: Shooting
Medal record
Shooting
Representing Wales
Commonwealth Games
Bronze medal – third place	2018 Gold Coast	Women's trap

Sarah Wixey (born 10 June 1970) is a Welsh sport shooter. She competed in the women's trap event at the 2018 Commonwealth Games, winning the bronze medal.
