= Caitlin Connor =

American sport shooter

Personal information
- Born: October 27, 1990 (age 35) Louisiana, United States
- Education: Louisiana State University
- Height: 1.75 m (5 ft 9 in)

Sport
- Country: United States
- Sport: Shooting
- Event: Skeet
Medal record
World Championships
Gold medal – first place	2018 Changwon	Skeet
Silver medal – second place	2015 Lonato	Skeet
Gold medal – first place	2018 Changwon	Skeet Team
Gold medal – first place	2017 Moscow	Skeet Team
Gold medal – first place	2015 Lonato	Skeet Team
ISSF World Cup
Silver medal – second place	2018 Tucson	Skeet
Silver medal – second place	2018 Guadalajara	Skeet
Silver medal – second place	2017 Acapulco	Skeet
Silver medal – second place	2015 Acapulco	Skeet
Silver medal – second place	2011 Sydney	Skeet
Silver medal – second place	2009 Minsk	Skeet
USA National Championships
Gold medal – first place	2015 USA National Championships	Skeet

Caitlin Connor (born October 27, 1990) is an American sport shooter.

She participated at the 2018 ISSF World Shooting Championships, winning the gold medal.
