= Laetisha Scanlan =

Australian sport shooter (born 1990)

Personal information
- Nickname: Teash
- Nationality: Australia
- Born: 13 April 1990 (age 36) Melbourne, Australia
- Height: 1.63 m (5 ft 4 in)
- Weight: 53 kg (117 lb)

Sport
- Country: Australia
- Sport: Sport shooter
- Event: Women's Trap (Olympic)
- Coached by: Adam Vella
Medal record
Women's shooting
Representing Australia
World Championships
Gold medal – first place	2019 Lonato del Garda	Mixed trap pairs
Silver medal – second place	2023 Baku	Trap team
Bronze medal – third place	2013 Lima	Trap team
Bronze medal – third place	2022 Osijek	Trap team
Bronze medal – third place	2022 Osijek	Mixed trap pairs
Commonwealth Games
Gold medal – first place	2010 Delhi	Trap pairs
Gold medal – first place	2014 Glasgow	Trap
Gold medal – first place	2018 Gold Coast	Trap
Commonwealth Championships
Gold medal – first place	2017 Brisbane	Trap
Silver medal – second place	2010 Delhi	Trap pairs
Oceanian Championships
Gold medal – first place	2011 Sydney	Trap
Gold medal – first place	2017 Brisbane	Trap
Silver medal – second place	2013 Sydney	Trap
- Updated on 15 July 2019

Laetisha Scanlan (born 13 April 1990) is an Australian sport shooter. She competed in the women's trap event at the 2014 Commonwealth Games where she won a gold medal, she later went on to win gold in the same event at the 2018 Commonwealth Games in the Gold Coast.

Scanlan competed in the women's trap event and also the team event with James Willett at the 2020 Summer Olympics. She missed securing a first Olympic medal by finishing in fourth place of the women's trap event. Detailed results.

Laetisha started shooting in 2005 at Frankston Australia Gun Club in Victoria, Australia. She has been a part of the Australian team since 2007 and competed in her first overseas competition that same year, in Nicosia.

She attended secondary school at St Margaret's School, Melbourne and later Haileybury.
