= Abbey Burton =

British sports shooter

Abbey Ling
Personal information
- Born: Abbey Burton; 30 March 1987 (age 39) High Wycombe
- Height: 174 cm (5 ft 9 in)
- Spouse: Edward Ling (m. 2014)
- Children: 2
Medal record
Women's shooting
Representing England
Commonwealth Games
Silver medal – second place	2010 Delhi	Trap pairs

Abbey Ling (née Burton; born 30 March 1987 in High Wycombe) is a British sports shooter from Nynehead, Somerset. She married fellow Team GB sports shooter Edward Ling in 2014 and has two daughters with him. She works as the head female coach at Ling Shooting School. She represented England at the 2018 Commonwealth Games. She is a five time World Champion, World Cup, and Commonwealth medalist.

== Medals ==
- Total of 6 individual medals at the World and European championships: 2 Bronze, 4 Silver.
- Total of 5 team medals at World, European and Commonwealth Championships: 1 Bronze, 2 Silver, 2 Gold.
- Beat the World Record of 75ex75 plus 22 single barrel final (total 97ex100)
- 4 times British Ladies champion - first woman to win three years in a row.
