= Catherine Skinner =

Australian sport shooter

Catherine Skinner OAM
Personal information
- Nationality: Australia
- Born: 11 February 1990 (age 36) Mansfield, Victoria, Australia
- Height: 172 cm (5 ft 8 in)
- Weight: 80 kg (176 lb)

Sport
- Country: Australia
- Sport: Sport shooter
- Event: Trap shooting
Medal record
Women's shooting
Representing Australia
Olympic Games
Gold medal – first place	2016 Rio de Janeiro	Trap
World Championships
Silver medal – second place	2017 Moscow	Trap
Silver medal – second place	2023 Baku	Trap team
Bronze medal – third place	2013 Lima	Trap team
Bronze medal – third place	2014 Granada	Trap
Bronze medal – third place	2022 Osijek	Trap team
Oceania Championships
Silver medal – second place	2017 Gold Coast	Trap
Bronze medal – third place	2011 Sydney	Trap
Bronze medal – third place	2015 Sydney	Trap
Universiade
Gold medal – first place	2013 Kazan	Trap
Silver medal – second place	2011 Shenzhen	Trap
Bronze medal – third place	2015 Gwangju	Trap
- Updated on 8 August 2016

Catherine Ann Skinner OAM (born 11 February 1990) is an Australian sport shooter. In 2016, she became an Olympic gold medalist.

== Early life ==
Skinner was born to Ken and Anne Skinner. She has two brothers, Andrew and Craig.

== Career ==
Skinner won Australia's only shooting medal at the 2013 Summer Universiade when she won gold in the trap event. She competed in the women's trap event at the 2014 Commonwealth Games where she reached the semifinals. She competed in the women's trap event at the 2016 Summer Olympics and won a gold medal. Skinner missed out on the finals in the women's trap at the 2018 Commonwealth Games, finishing in 8th place.

== Personal life ==
Skinner graduated from RMIT in 2015, with a degree in chemical engineering. She found her studies challenging, taking a total of eight years to complete due to the fact that she was travelling to compete. She worked at Dow Chemical for three months in 2017.

== Recognition ==
Skinner was awarded the Medal of the Order of Australia (OAM) in the 2017 Australia Day Honours for "service to sport as a gold medallist at the Rio 2016 Olympic Games."
