= United States at the 2016 Summer Olympics =

- Flag of the United States
- IOC code: USA
- NOC: United States Olympic Committee

in Rio de Janeiro August 5, 2016 – August 21, 2016
- Competitors: 554 (263 men and 291 women) in 33 sports
- Flag bearers: Michael Phelps (opening); Simone Biles (closing)
- Medals Ranked 1st: Gold 46 Silver 37 Bronze 38 Total 121

Summer Olympics appearances (overview)
- 1896; 1900; 1904; 1908; 1912; 1920; 1924; 1928; 1932; 1936; 1948; 1952; 1956; 1960; 1964; 1968; 1972; 1976; 1980; 1984; 1988; 1992; 1996; 2000; 2004; 2008; 2012; 2016; 2020; 2024; 2028

Other related appearances
- 1906 Intercalated Games

The United States of America (USA), represented by the United States Olympic Committee (USOC), competed at the 2016 Summer Olympics in Rio de Janeiro, from August 5 to 21, 2016. U.S. athletes have appeared in every Summer Olympic Games of the modern era, with the exception of the 1980 Summer Olympics in Moscow, which they boycotted in protest of the Soviet invasion of Afghanistan. For the second consecutive time in the Summer Olympics, the United States was represented by more female than male athletes (264 men and 291 women).

The 2016 Olympics were the third most successful for the United States in terms of overall medal count (121) and the most successful not held in the United States: U.S. athletes won 231 total medals at St. Louis in 1904 and 174 at Los Angeles in 1984. These Games also witnessed the thousandth Summer Olympic gold medal for the Americans.

== Medalists ==
The following U.S. competitors won medals at the games. In the by discipline sections below, medalists' names are bolded.

Medal	Name	Sport	Event	Date
Gold	Virginia Thrasher	Shooting	Women's 10 m air rifle	August 6
Gold	Nathan Adrian; Caeleb Dressel; Anthony Ervin^{[a]} Jimmy Feigen^{[a]} Ryan Held; Michael Phelps; Blake Pieroni^{[a]}	Swimming	Men's 4 × 100 m freestyle relay	August 7
Gold	Katie Ledecky	Swimming	Women's 400 m freestyle	August 7
Gold	Ryan Murphy	Swimming	Men's 100 m backstroke	August 8
Gold	Lilly King	Swimming	Women's 100 m breaststroke	August 8
Gold	Simone Biles; Gabby Douglas; Laurie Hernandez; Madison Kocian; Aly Raisman	Gymnastics	Women's artistic team all-around	August 9
Gold	Michael Phelps	Swimming	Men's 200 m butterfly	August 9
Gold	Gunnar Bentz^{[a]} Jack Conger^{[a]} Conor Dwyer; Townley Haas; Ryan Lochte; Michael Phelps; Clark Smith^{[a]}	Swimming	Men's 4 × 200 m freestyle relay	August 9
Gold	Katie Ledecky	Swimming	Women's 200 m freestyle	August 9
Gold	Kristin Armstrong	Cycling	Women's time trial	August 10
Gold	Maya DiRado; Missy Franklin^{[a]} Katie Ledecky; Melanie Margalis^{[a]} Cierra Runge^{[a]} Allison Schmitt; Leah Smith	Swimming	Women's 4 × 200 m freestyle relay	August 10
Gold	Simone Biles	Gymnastics	Women's artistic individual all-around	August 11
Gold	Kayla Harrison	Judo	Women's 78 kg	August 11
Gold	Ryan Murphy	Swimming	Men's 200 m backstroke	August 11
Gold	Michael Phelps	Swimming	Men's 200 m individual medley	August 11
Gold	Simone Manuel	Swimming	Women's 100 m freestyle	August 11
Gold	Michelle Carter	Athletics	Women's shot put	August 12
Gold	Anthony Ervin	Swimming	Men's 50 m freestyle	August 12
Gold	Katie Ledecky	Swimming	Women's 800 m freestyle	August 12
Gold	Maya DiRado	Swimming	Women's 200 m backstroke	August 12
Gold	Jeff Henderson	Athletics	Men's long jump	August 13
Gold	Amanda Elmore; Tessa Gobbo; Elle Logan; Meghan Musnicki; Amanda Polk; Emily Regan; Lauren Schmetterling; Kerry Simmonds; Katelin Snyder	Rowing	Women's eight	August 13
Gold	Nathan Adrian; Kevin Cordes^{[a]} Caeleb Dressel^{[a]} Cody Miller; Ryan Murphy; Michael Phelps; David Plummer^{[a]} Tom Shields^{[a]}	Swimming	Men's 4 × 100 m medley relay	August 13
Gold	Kathleen Baker; Lilly King; Simone Manuel; Katie Meili^{[a]} Olivia Smoliga^{[a]} Dana Vollmer; Abbey Weitzeil^{[a]} Kelsi Worrell^{[a]}	Swimming	Women's 4 × 100 m medley relay	August 13
Gold	Simone Biles	Gymnastics	Women's vault	August 14
Gold	Bethanie Mattek-Sands; Jack Sock	Tennis	Mixed doubles	August 14
Gold	Christian Taylor	Athletics	Men's triple jump	August 16
Gold	Simone Biles	Gymnastics	Women's floor	August 16
Gold	Brianna Rollins	Athletics	Women's 100 m hurdles	August 17
Gold	Tianna Bartoletta	Athletics	Women's long jump	August 17
Gold	Kerron Clement	Athletics	Men's 400 m hurdles	August 18
Gold	Ryan Crouser	Athletics	Men's shot put	August 18
Gold	Ashton Eaton	Athletics	Men's decathlon	August 18
Gold	Dalilah Muhammad	Athletics	Women's 400 m hurdles	August 18
Gold	Helen Maroulis	Wrestling	Women's freestyle 53 kg	August 18
Gold	Morolake Akinosun^{[a]} Tianna Bartoletta; Tori Bowie; Allyson Felix; English Gardner	Athletics	Women's 4 × 100 m relay	August 19
Gold	Connor Fields	Cycling	Men's BMX	August 19
Gold	United States women's national water polo team: Caroline Clark; Kami Craig; Rachel Fattal; Aria Fischer; Makenzie Fischer; Kaleigh Gilchrist; Samantha Hill; Ashleigh Johnson; Courtney Mathewson; Madeline Musselmann; Kiley Neushul; Melissa Seidemann; Maggie Steffens	Water polo	Women's tournament	August 19
Gold	Matthew Centrowitz Jr.	Athletics	Men's 1500 m	August 20
Gold	Kyle Clemons^{[a]} Arman Hall; Tony McQuay; LaShawn Merritt; Gil Roberts; David Verburg^{[a]}	Athletics	Men's 4 × 400 m relay	August 20
Gold	Taylor Ellis-Watson^{[a]} Allyson Felix; Phyllis Francis; Natasha Hastings; Francena McCorory^{[a]} Courtney Okolo	Athletics	Women's 4 × 400 m relay	August 20
Gold	United States women's national basketball team: Seimone Augustus; Sue Bird; Tamika Catchings; Tina Charles; Elena Delle Donne; Sylvia Fowles; Brittney Griner; Angel McCoughtry; Maya Moore; Breanna Stewart; Diana Taurasi; Lindsay Whalen	Basketball	Women's tournament	August 20
Gold	Gwen Jorgensen	Triathlon	Women's	August 20
Gold	United States men's national basketball team: Carmelo Anthony; Harrison Barnes; Jimmy Butler; DeMarcus Cousins; DeMar DeRozan; Kevin Durant; Paul George; Draymond Green; Kyrie Irving; DeAndre Jordan; Kyle Lowry; Klay Thompson	Basketball	Men's tournament	August 21
Gold	Claressa Shields	Boxing	Women's middleweight	August 21
Gold	Kyle Snyder	Wrestling	Men's freestyle 97 kg	August 21
Silver	Brady Ellison; Zach Garrett; Jake Kaminski	Archery	Men's team	August 6
Silver	Chase Kalisz	Swimming	Men's 400 m individual medley	August 6
Silver	Maya DiRado	Swimming	Women's 400 m individual medley	August 6
Silver	Katie Ledecky; Simone Manuel; Lia Neal^{[a]} Allison Schmitt^{[a]} Dana Vollmer; Amanda Weir^{[a]} Abbey Weitzeil	Swimming	Women's 4 × 100 m freestyle relay	August 6
Silver	Alexander Massialas	Fencing	Men's foil	August 7
Silver	David Boudia; Steele Johnson	Diving	Men's synchronized 10 m platform	August 8
Silver	Kathleen Baker	Swimming	Women's 100 m backstroke	August 8
Silver	Travis Stevens	Judo	Men's 81 kg	August 9
Silver	Sam Dorman; Michael Hixon	Diving	Men's 3 m synchronized springboard	August 10
Silver	Daryl Homer	Fencing	Men's sabre	August 10
Silver	Josh Prenot	Swimming	Men's 200 m breaststroke	August 10
Silver	Aly Raisman	Gymnastics	Women's artistic individual all-around	August 11
Silver	Michael Phelps	Swimming	Men's 100 m butterfly	August 12
Silver	Tori Bowie	Athletics	Women's 100 m	August 13
Silver	Kelly Catlin; Chloé Dygert; Sarah Hammer; Jennifer Valente	Cycling	Women's team pursuit	August 13
Silver	Gevvie Stone	Rowing	Women's single sculls	August 13
Silver	Connor Jaeger	Swimming	Men's 1500 m freestyle	August 13
Silver	Simone Manuel	Swimming	Women's 50 m freestyle	August 13
Silver	Justin Gatlin	Athletics	Men's 100 m	August 14
Silver	Madison Kocian	Gymnastics	Women's uneven bars	August 14
Silver	Rajeev Ram; Venus Williams	Tennis	Mixed doubles	August 14
Silver	Allyson Felix	Athletics	Women's 400 m	August 15
Silver	Laurie Hernandez	Gymnastics	Women's balance beam	August 15
Silver	Will Claye	Athletics	Men's triple jump	August 16
Silver	Sarah Hammer	Cycling	Women's omnium	August 16
Silver	Danell Leyva	Gymnastics	Men's parallel bars	August 16
Silver	Danell Leyva	Gymnastics	Men's horizontal bar	August 16
Silver	Aly Raisman	Gymnastics	Women's floor	August 16
Silver	Evan Jager	Athletics	Men's 3000 m steeplechase	August 17
Silver	Nia Ali	Athletics	Women's 100 m hurdles	August 17
Silver	Brittney Reese	Athletics	Women's long jump	August 17
Silver	Lucy Davis; Kent Farrington; Beezie Madden; McLain Ward	Equestrian	Team jumping	August 17
Silver	Joe Kovacs	Athletics	Men's shot put	August 18
Silver	Sandi Morris	Athletics	Women's pole vault	August 19
Silver	Alise Willoughby	Cycling	Women's BMX	August 19
Silver	Paul Chelimo	Athletics	Men's 5000 m	August 20
Silver	Shakur Stevenson	Boxing	Men's bantamweight	August 20
Bronze	Corey Cogdell	Shooting	Women's trap	August 7
Bronze	Cody Miller	Swimming	Men's 100 m breaststroke	August 7
Bronze	Leah Smith	Swimming	Women's 400 m freestyle	August 7
Bronze	Dana Vollmer	Swimming	Women's 100 m butterfly	August 7
Bronze	Conor Dwyer	Swimming	Men's 200 m freestyle	August 8
Bronze	David Plummer	Swimming	Men's 100 m backstroke	August 8
Bronze	Katie Meili	Swimming	Women's 100 m breaststroke	August 8
Bronze	Phillip Dutton	Equestrian	Individual eventing	August 9
Bronze	Maya DiRado	Swimming	Women's 200 m individual medley	August 9
Bronze	Nathan Adrian	Swimming	Men's 100 m freestyle	August 10
Bronze	Brady Ellison	Archery	Men's individual	August 12
Bronze	Nico Hernández	Boxing	Men's light flyweight	August 12
Bronze	Allison Brock; Laura Graves; Kasey Perry-Glass; Steffen Peters	Equestrian	Team dressage	August 12
Bronze	Miles Chamley-Watson; Race Imboden; Alexander Massialas; Gerek Meinhardt	Fencing	Men's team foil	August 12
Bronze	Kim Rhode	Shooting	Women's skeet	August 12
Bronze	Nathan Adrian	Swimming	Men's 50 m freestyle	August 12
Bronze	Steve Johnson; Jack Sock	Tennis	Men's doubles	August 12
Bronze	Monica Aksamit; Ibtihaj Muhammad; Dagmara Wozniak; Mariel Zagunis	Fencing	Women's team sabre	August 13
Bronze	LaShawn Merritt	Athletics	Men's 400 m	August 14
Bronze	Matt Kuchar	Golf	Men's	August 14
Bronze	Alexander Naddour	Gymnastics	Men's pommel horse	August 14
Bronze	Sarah Robles	Weightlifting	Women's +75 kg	August 14
Bronze	Clayton Murphy	Athletics	Men's 800 m	August 15
Bronze	Sam Kendricks	Athletics	Men's pole vault	August 15
Bronze	Emma Coburn	Athletics	Women's 3000 m steeplechase	August 15
Bronze	Simone Biles	Gymnastics	Women's balance beam	August 15
Bronze	Jennifer Simpson	Athletics	Women's 1500 m	August 16
Bronze	Caleb Paine	Sailing	Men's Finn	August 16
Bronze	Tori Bowie	Athletics	Women's 200 m	August 17
Bronze	Kristi Castlin	Athletics	Women's 100 m hurdles	August 17
Bronze	April Ross; Kerri Walsh Jennings	Volleyball	Women's beach	August 17
Bronze	Ashley Spencer	Athletics	Women's 400 m hurdles	August 18
Bronze	David Boudia	Diving	Men's 10 m platform	August 20
Bronze	Jackie Galloway	Taekwondo	Women's +67 kg	August 20
Bronze	United States women's national volleyball team: Rachael Adams; Foluke Akinradewo; Kayla Banwarth; Alisha Glass; Christa Harmotto; Kimberly Hill; Jordan Larson; Carli Lloyd; Karsta Lowe; Kelly Murphy; Kelsey Robinson; Courtney Thompson	Volleyball	Women's indoor tournament	August 20
Bronze	J'den Cox	Wrestling	Men's freestyle 86 kg	August 20
Bronze	Galen Rupp	Athletics	Men's marathon	August 21
Bronze	United States men's national volleyball team: Matthew Anderson; Micah Christenson; Maxwell Holt; Thomas Jaeschke; Davie Lee; William Priddy; Aaron Russell; Taylor Sander; Erik Shoji; Kawika Shoji; David Smith; Murphy Troy	Volleyball	Men's indoor tournament	August 21

Medals by sport
Sport	1st place, gold medalist(s)	2nd place, silver medalist(s)	3rd place, bronze medalist(s)	Total
Swimming	16	8	9	**33**
Athletics	13	10	9	**32**
Gymnastics	4	6	2	**12**
Cycling	2	3	0	**5**
Wrestling	2	0	1	**3**
Basketball	2	0	0	**2**
Boxing	1	1	1	**3**
Tennis	1	1	1	**3**
Judo	1	1	0	**2**
Rowing	1	1	0	**2**
Shooting	1	0	2	**3**
Triathlon	1	0	0	**1**
Water polo	1	0	0	**1**
Fencing	0	2	2	**4**
Diving	0	2	1	**3**
Equestrian	0	1	2	**3**
Archery	0	1	1	**2**
Volleyball	0	0	3	**3**
Golf	0	0	1	**1**
Sailing	0	0	1	**1**
Taekwondo	0	0	1	**1**
Weightlifting	0	0	1	**1**
Total	46	37	38	121

Medals by day
Day	Date	1st place, gold medalist(s)	2nd place, silver medalist(s)	3rd place, bronze medalist(s)	Total
1	August 6	1	4	0	**5**
2	August 7	2	1	4	**7**
3	August 8	2	2	3	**7**
4	August 9	4	1	2	**7**
5	August 10	2	3	1	**6**
6	August 11	5	1	0	**6**
7	August 12	4	1	7	**12**
8	August 13	4	5	1	**10**
9	August 14	2	3	4	**9**
10	August 15	0	2	4	**6**
11	August 16	2	5	2	**9**
12	August 17	2	4	3	**9**
13	August 18	5	1	1	**7**
14	August 19	3	2	0	**5**
15	August 20	5	2	4	**11**
16	August 21	3	0	2	**5**
Total		46	37	38	121

Medals by gender
Gender	1st place, gold medalist(s)	2nd place, silver medalist(s)	3rd place, bronze medalist(s)	Total	Percentage
Female	27	17	17	**61**	50.4%
Male	18	18	20	**56**	46.3%
Mixed	1	2	1	**4**	3.3%
Total	46	37	38	121	100%

Multiple medalists
Name	Sport	1st place, gold medalist(s)	2nd place, silver medalist(s)	3rd place, bronze medalist(s)	Total
Michael Phelps	Swimming	5	1	0	**6**
Katie Ledecky	Swimming	4	1	0	**5**
Simone Biles	Gymnastics	4	0	1	**5**
Simone Manuel	Swimming	2	2	0	**4**
Maya DiRado	Swimming	2	1	1	**4**
Nathan Adrian	Swimming	2	0	2	**4**
Ryan Murphy	Swimming	3	0	0	**3**
Allyson Felix	Athletics	2	1	0	**3**
Aly Raisman	Gymnastics	1	2	0	**3**
Tori Bowie	Athletics	1	1	1	**3**
Dana Vollmer	Swimming	1	1	1	**3**
Tianna Bartoletta	Athletics	2	0	0	**2**
Anthony Ervin	Swimming	2	0	0	**2**
Caeleb Dressel	Swimming	2	0	0	**2**
Kathleen Baker	Swimming	1	1	0	**2**
Laurie Hernandez	Gymnastics	1	1	0	**2**
Madison Kocian	Gymnastics	1	1	0	**2**
Allison Schmitt	Swimming	1	1	0	**2**
Abbey Weitzeil	Swimming	1	1	0	**2**
Conor Dwyer	Swimming	1	0	1	**2**
Katie Meili	Swimming	1	0	1	**2**
LaShawn Merritt	Athletics	1	0	1	**2**
Cody Miller	Swimming	1	0	1	**2**
David Plummer	Swimming	1	0	1	**2**
Jack Sock	Tennis	1	0	1	**2**
Leah Smith	Swimming	1	0	1	**2**
Sarah Hammer	Cycling	0	2	0	**2**
Danell Leyva	Gymnastics	0	2	0	**2**
David Boudia	Diving	0	1	1	**2**
Brady Ellison	Archery	0	1	1	**2**
Alexander Massialas	Fencing	0	1	1	**2**

^{a} Athletes who participated in preliminary rounds but not the final round.

== Competitors ==
The following is the list of number of competitors in the Games. Note that reserves in field hockey, football, and handball are not counted:

Sport	Men	Women	Total
Archery	3	1	4
Athletics (track & field)	64	64	128
Badminton	3	4	7
Basketball	12	12	24
Boxing	6	2	8
Canoeing	3	2	5
Cycling	8	12	20
Diving	5	5	10
Equestrian	6	6	12
Fencing	7	9	16
Field hockey	0	16	16
Football (soccer)	0	18	18
Golf	4	3	7
Gymnastics	6	12	18
Judo	3	3	6
Modern pentathlon	1	2	3
Rowing	21	20	41
Rugby sevens	12	12	24
Sailing	8	7	15
Shooting	13	7	20
Swimming	25	22	47
Synchronized swimming	—	2	2
Table tennis	3	3	6
Taekwondo	2	2	4
Tennis	5	6	11
Triathlon	3	3	6
Volleyball	16	16	32
Water polo	13	13	26
Weightlifting	1	3	4
Wrestling	10	4	14
Total	263	291	554

== Archery ==
Three U.S. archers qualified for the men's events after having secured a top eight finish in the men's team recurve at the 2015 World Archery Championships in Copenhagen, Denmark. Another U.S. archer also qualified for the women's individual recurve by obtaining one of the eight Olympic places available from the same tournament.

Athlete	Event	Ranking round		Round of 64	Round of 32	Round of 16	Quarterfinals	Semifinals	Final / BM	
Athlete	Event	Score	Seed	Opposition Score	Opposition Score	Opposition Score	Opposition Score	Opposition Score	Opposition Score	Rank
Brady Ellison	Men's individual	690	2	El Ghrari (LBA); W 6–0	Kaminski (USA); W 6–2	Garrett (USA); W 6–4	Furukawa (JPN); W 6–2	Ku (KOR); L 5–6	van den Berg (NED); W 6–2	3rd place, bronze medalist(s)
Zach Garrett	Men's individual	674	15	Kamaruddin (MAS); W 6–0	Duenas (CAN); W 7–3	Ellison (USA); L 4–6	did not advance			
Jake Kaminski	Men's individual	660	31	D'Almeida (BRA); W 6–4	Ellison (USA); L 2–6	did not advance				
Brady Ellison; Zach Garrett; Jake Kaminski	Men's team	2024	2	—N/a		Bye	Indonesia; W 6–2	China; W 6–0	South Korea; L 0–6	2nd place, silver medalist(s)
Mackenzie Brown	Women's individual	641	19	Mandia (ITA); W 6–4	Htwe (MYA); L 3–7	did not advance				

== Athletics (track and field) ==
U.S. athletes achieved qualifying standards in the following athletics events (up to a maximum of 3 athletes in each event). The team was selected based on the results of the 2016 United States Olympic Trials (July 1 to 10).

Six marathon runners (three per gender) were the first set of U.S. track and field athletes selected for the Games by virtue of their top three finish at the Olympic Team Trials in Los Angeles on February 13, 2016. One week later in Santee, California, three-time Olympian John Nunn joined them on the team by winning the men's 50 km (31 mi) walk trials under the entry standard (4:06:00).

Two female race walkers (Michta-Coffey and Melville) were added to the U.S. track and field team by finishing among the top two within the qualifying standard (1:36:00) in the 20 km (12 mi) walk at the first day of the Olympic Team Trials in Salem, Oregon. Meanwhile, Nunn won the men's race (1:25:37), but failed to achieve the entry standard of 1:24:00.

Following the completion of the Olympic Trials, a total of 126 athletes (61 men and 65 women) were named to the U.S. track and field team for the Games, with Bernard Lagat running in the long-distance at his fifth Olympics and hurdler Sydney McLaughlin establishing herself as the youngest (aged 16) in four decades. Apart from Lagat and McLaughlin, the U.S. team also featured six Olympic champions: sprinters Justin Gatlin (2004), LaShawn Merritt (2008), and Allyson Felix (2012), long jumper Brittney Reese, decathlete and world record holder Ashton Eaton, and triple jumper Christian Taylor. Hammer throwers Kibwe Johnson, Conor McCullough, and Rudy Winkler were added to the team on July 14, after the IAAF extended invitations to fill out the event.

On August 16, with about 2000 meters to go in a qualifying heat for the women's 5000 meter race at the 2016 Summer Olympics, Abbey D'Agostino tripped over Nikki Hamblin who had fallen in front of her. Instead of immediately continuing the race, she first helped Hamblin up, encouraging her not to quit. D'Agostino herself, however, had torn her ACL and meniscus. Despite her obvious pain, she nevertheless finished the race, after which she and Hamblin embraced. D'Agostino, Hamblin and Jennifer Wenth were advanced to the final because of the incident, but D'Agostino wasn't able to compete because of her injuries. On August 20, for their actions at the Rio Olympics, D'Agostino and Hamblin received Fair Play awards from The International Fair Play Committee (CIFP), with the support of the International Olympic Committee (IOC).

Key

- Note–Ranks given for track events are within the athlete's heat only
- Q = Qualified for the next round
- q = Qualified for the next round as a fastest loser or, in field events, by position without achieving the qualifying target
- NR = National record
- N/A = Round not applicable for the event
- Bye = Athlete not required to compete in round

Track & road events
Men

Athlete	Event	Heat		Quarterfinal		Semifinal		Final	
Athlete	Event	Result	Rank	Result	Rank	Result	Rank	Result	Rank
Marvin Bracy	100 m	Bye		10.16	3 q	10.08	6	Did not advance	
Trayvon Bromell	100 m	Bye		10.13	2 Q	10.01	3 q	10.06	8
Justin Gatlin	100 m	Bye		10.01	1 Q	9.94	1 Q	9.89	2nd place, silver medalist(s)
Justin Gatlin	200 m	20.42	1 Q	—N/a		20.13	3	Did not advance	
LaShawn Merritt	200 m	20.13	1 Q	—N/a		19.94	1 Q	20.19	6
Ameer Webb	200 m	20.31	3 q	—N/a		20.43	6	Did not advance	
LaShawn Merritt	400 m	45.28	1 Q	—N/a		44.21	2 Q	43.85	3rd place, bronze medalist(s)
Gil Roberts	400 m	45.27	2 Q	—N/a		44.65	4	Did not advance	
David Verburg	400 m	45.48	4 q	—N/a		45.61	5	Did not advance	
Boris Berian	800 m	1:45.87	3 Q	—N/a		1:44.56	2 Q	1:46.15	8
Charles Jock	800 m	1:47.06	6	—N/a		Did not advance			
Clayton Murphy	800 m	1:46.18	4 q	—N/a		1:44.30	2 Q	1:42.93	3rd place, bronze medalist(s)
Robby Andrews	1500 m	3:46.97	3 Q	—N/a		DSQ		Did not advance	
Ben Blankenship	1500 m	3:38.92	9 q	—N/a		3:39.99	4 Q	3:51.09	8
Matthew Centrowitz Jr.	1500 m	3:39.31	5 Q	—N/a		3:39.61	3 Q	3:50.00	1st place, gold medalist(s)
Paul Chelimo	5000 m	13:19.54	1 Q	—N/a				13:03.90	2nd place, silver medalist(s)
Bernard Lagat	5000 m	13:26.02	5 Q	—N/a				13:06.78	5
Hassan Mead	5000 m	13:34.27	13	—N/a				13:09.81	11
Shadrack Kipchirchir	10000 m	—N/a						27:58.32	19
Leonard Korir	10000 m	—N/a						27:35.65	14
Galen Rupp	10000 m	—N/a						27:08.92	5
Devon Allen	110 m hurdles	13.41	2 Q	—N/a		13.36	3 q	13.31	5
Ronnie Ash	110 m hurdles	13.31	1 Q	—N/a		13.36	2 Q	13.45	8
Jeffrey Porter	110 m hurdles	13.50	2 Q	—N/a		13.45	3	Did not advance	
Kerron Clement	400 m hurdles	49.17	3 Q	—N/a		48.26	1 Q	47.73	1st place, gold medalist(s)
Byron Robinson	400 m hurdles	48.98	3 Q	—N/a		48.65	3	Did not advance	
Michael Tinsley	400 m hurdles	50.18	6	—N/a		Did not advance			
Hillary Bor	3000 m steeplechase	8:25.01	1 Q	—N/a				8:22.74	9
Donald Cabral	3000 m steeplechase	8:21.96	3 Q	—N/a				8:25.81	10
Evan Jager	3000 m steeplechase	8:25.86	1 Q	—N/a				8:04.28	2nd place, silver medalist(s)
Trayvon Bromell; Christian Coleman^{[b]} Justin Gatlin; Tyson Gay; Jarrion Lawson^{[b]} Mike Rodgers	4 × 100 m relay	37.65	1 Q	—N/a				DSQ	
Kyle Clemons^{[b]} Arman Hall; Tony McQuay; LaShawn Merritt; Gil Roberts; David Verburg^{[b]}	4 × 400 m relay	2:58.38	2 Q	—N/a				2:57.30	1st place, gold medalist(s)
Meb Keflezighi	Marathon	—N/a						2:16:46	33
Galen Rupp	Marathon	—N/a						2:10:05	3rd place, bronze medalist(s)
Jared Ward	Marathon	—N/a						2:11:30	6
John Nunn	50 km walk	—N/a						4:16:12	43

Women

Athlete	Event	Heat		Quarterfinal		Semifinal		Final	
Athlete	Event	Result	Rank	Result	Rank	Result	Rank	Result	Rank
Tianna Bartoletta	100 m	Bye		11.23	1 Q	11.00	4	Did not advance	
Tori Bowie	100 m	Bye		11.13	1 Q	10.90	=1 Q	10.83	2nd place, silver medalist(s)
English Gardner	100 m	Bye		11.09	1 Q	10.90	2 Q	10.94	6
Tori Bowie	200 m	22.47	1 Q	—N/a		22.13	1 Q	22.15	3rd place, bronze medalist(s)
Jenna Prandini	200 m	22.62	1 Q	—N/a		22.55	4	Did not advance	
Deajah Stevens	200 m	22.45	1 Q	—N/a		22.38	3 q	22.65	7
Allyson Felix	400 m	51.24	1 Q	—N/a		49.67	1 Q	49.51	2nd place, silver medalist(s)
Phyllis Francis	400 m	50.58	1 Q	—N/a		50.31	1 Q	50.41	5
Natasha Hastings	400 m	51.31	1 Q	—N/a		49.90	2 Q	50.34	4
Kate Grace	800 m	1:59.96	3 q	—N/a		1:58.79	3 q	1:59.57	8
Chrishuna Williams	800 m	2:01.19	6	—N/a		Did not advance			
Ajeé Wilson	800 m	1:59.44	2 Q	—N/a		1:59.75	3	Did not advance	
Brenda Martinez	1500 m	4:11.74	3 Q	—N/a		4:10.41	12	Did not advance	
Shannon Rowbury	1500 m	4:06.47	2 Q	—N/a		4:04.46	3 Q	4:11.05	4
Jennifer Simpson	1500 m	4:06.99	4 Q	—N/a		4:05.07	4 Q	4:10.53	3rd place, bronze medalist(s)
Kim Conley	5000 m	15:36.00	12	—N/a				Did not advance	
Abbey D'Agostino	5000 m	17:10.02	16 q	—N/a				DNS	
Shelby Houlihan	5000 m	15:19.76	4 Q	—N/a				15:08.89	11
Marielle Hall	10000 m	—N/a						32:39.32	33
Molly Huddle	10000 m	—N/a						30:13.17 NA	6
Emily Infeld	10000 m	—N/a						31:26.94	11
Nia Ali	100 m hurdles	12.76	1 Q	—N/a		12.65	1 Q	12.59	2nd place, silver medalist(s)
Kristi Castlin	100 m hurdles	12.68	1 Q	—N/a		12.63	1 Q	12.61	3rd place, bronze medalist(s)
Brianna Rollins	100 m hurdles	12.54	1 Q	—N/a		12.47	1 Q	12.48	1st place, gold medalist(s)
Sydney McLaughlin	400 m hurdles	56.32	5 q	—N/a		56.22	5	Did not advance	
Dalilah Muhammad	400 m hurdles	55.33	1 Q	—N/a		53.89	1 Q	53.13	1st place, gold medalist(s)
Ashley Spencer	400 m hurdles	55.12	1 Q	—N/a		54.87	1 Q	53.72	3rd place, bronze medalist(s)
Emma Coburn	3000 m steeplechase	9:18.12	2 Q	—N/a				9:07.63 NA	3rd place, bronze medalist(s)
Courtney Frerichs	3000 m steeplechase	9:27.02	3 Q	—N/a				9:22.87	11
Colleen Quigley	3000 m steeplechase	9:21.82	4 q	—N/a				9:21.10	8
Morolake Akinosun^{[b]} Tianna Bartoletta; Tori Bowie; Allyson Felix; English Gardner	4 × 100 m relay	41.77	1 q^{[c]}	—N/a				41.01	1st place, gold medalist(s)
Taylor Ellis-Watson^{[b]} Allyson Felix; Phyllis Francis; Natasha Hastings; Francena McCorory^{[b]} Courtney Okolo	4 × 400 m relay	3:21.42	1 Q	—N/a				3:19.06	1st place, gold medalist(s)
Amy Cragg	Marathon	—N/a						2:28:25	9
Shalane Flanagan	Marathon	—N/a						2:25:26	6
Desiree Linden	Marathon	—N/a						2:26:08	7
Miranda Melville	20 km walk	—N/a						1:35:48	34
Maria Michta-Coffey	20 km walk	—N/a						1:33:36	22

^{b} Athletes that participated in the heats only.
^{c} During the second heat the United States missed their second handover which was caused by Franciela Krasucki of the Brazilian team bumping Allyson Felix as she approached the handoff to English Gardner. The American appeal was upheld, and they were given a second chance to qualify for the final, which the United States team accomplished with the number one qualifying time of 41.77.

Field events
Men

Athlete	Event	Qualification		Final	
Athlete	Event	Distance	Position	Distance	Position
Mike Hartfield	Long jump	7.66	25	Did not advance	
Jeff Henderson	Long jump	8.20	2 Q	8.38	1st place, gold medalist(s)
Jarrion Lawson	Long jump	7.99	7 q	8.25	4
Chris Benard	Triple jump	16.55	16	Did not advance	
Will Claye	Triple jump	17.05	3 Q	17.76	2nd place, silver medalist(s)
Christian Taylor	Triple jump	17.24	1 Q	17.86	1st place, gold medalist(s)
Bradley Adkins	High jump	2.26	21	Did not advance	
Erik Kynard	High jump	2.29	=5 q	2.36	6
Ricky Robertson	High jump	2.26	17	Did not advance	
Logan Cunningham	Pole vault	5.30	=28	Did not advance	
Sam Kendricks	Pole vault	5.70	1 q	5.85	3rd place, bronze medalist(s)
Cale Simmons	Pole vault	5.30	=28	Did not advance	
Ryan Crouser	Shot put	21.59	1 Q	22.52 OR	1st place, gold medalist(s)
Darrell Hill	Shot put	19.56	23	Did not advance	
Joe Kovacs	Shot put	20.73	5 Q	21.78	2nd place, silver medalist(s)
Tavis Bailey	Discus throw	59.81	26	Did not advance	
Andrew Evans	Discus throw	61.87	16	Did not advance	
Mason Finley	Discus throw	63.68	6 q	62.05	11
Sam Crouser	Javelin throw	73.78	34	Did not advance	
Sean Furey	Javelin throw	72.61	35	Did not advance	
Cyrus Hostetler	Javelin throw	79.76	20	Did not advance	
Kibwe Johnson	Hammer throw	NM	—	Did not advance	
Conor McCullough	Hammer throw	72.88	16	Did not advance	
Rudy Winkler	Hammer throw	71.89	18	Did not advance	

Women

Athlete	Event	Qualification		Final	
Athlete	Event	Distance	Position	Distance	Position
Tianna Bartoletta	Long jump	6.70	5 q	7.17	1st place, gold medalist(s)
Janay DeLoach	Long jump	6.50	13	Did not advance	
Brittney Reese	Long jump	6.78	3 Q	7.15	2nd place, silver medalist(s)
Christina Epps	Triple jump	14.01	15	Did not advance	
Andrea Geubelle	Triple jump	13.93	21	Did not advance	
Keturah Orji	Triple jump	14.08	12 q	14.71 NR	4
Vashti Cunningham	High jump	1.94	14 Q	1.88	13
Chaunté Lowe	High jump	1.94	=1 Q	1.97	4
Inika McPherson	High jump	1.94	=1 Q	1.93	10
Sandi Morris	Pole vault	4.55	=8 q	4.85	2nd place, silver medalist(s)
Jennifer Suhr	Pole vault	4.60	=2 Q	4.60	=7
Alexis Weeks	Pole vault	4.45	=19	Did not advance	
Michelle Carter	Shot put	19.01	3 Q	20.63	1st place, gold medalist(s)
Felisha Johnson	Shot put	17.69	14	Did not advance	
Raven Saunders	Shot put	18.83	4 Q	19.35	5
Whitney Ashley	Discus throw	NM	—	Did not advance	
Kelsey Card	Discus throw	56.41	25	Did not advance	
Shelbi Vaughan	Discus throw	53.33	29	Did not advance	
Brittany Borman	Javelin throw	56.04	27	Did not advance	
Maggie Malone	Javelin throw	56.47	25	Did not advance	
Kara Winger	Javelin throw	61.02	13	Did not advance	
Gwen Berry	Hammer throw	69.90	14	Did not advance	
Amber Campbell	Hammer throw	71.09	8 q	72.74	6
DeAnna Price	Hammer throw	70.79	9 q	70.95	8

Combined events – Men's decathlon

Athlete	Event	100 m	LJ	SP	HJ	400 m	110H	DT	PV	JT	1500 m	Final	Rank
Ashton Eaton	Result	10.46	7.94	14.73	2.01	46.07	13.80	45.49	5.20	59.77	4:23.33	8893 OR	1st place, gold medalist(s)
Ashton Eaton	Points	985	1045	773	813	1005	1000	777	972	734	789	8893 OR	1st place, gold medalist(s)
Jeremy Taiwo	Result	11.01	7.45	14.92	2.19	48.78	14.57	39.91	5.00	51.29	4:21.96	8300	11
Jeremy Taiwo	Points	858	922	785	982	872	902	663	910	608	798	8300	11
Zach Ziemek	Result	10.71	7.49	13.44	2.10	49.83	14.77	49.42	5.20	60.92	4:42.97	8392	7
Zach Ziemek	Points	926	932	694	896	822	878	858	972	752	662	8392	7

Combined events – Women's heptathlon

Athlete	Event	100H	HJ	SP	200 m	LJ	JT	800 m	Final	Rank
Heather Miller-Koch	Result	13.56	1.80	12.91	24.97	6.16	40.25	2:06.82	6213	18
Heather Miller-Koch	Points	1041	978	721	890	899	672	1012	6213	18
Barbara Nwaba	Result	13.81	1.83	14.81	24.77	5.81	46.85	2:11.61	6309	12
Barbara Nwaba	Points	1005	1016	848	908	792	799	941	6309	12
Kendell Williams	Result	13.04	1.83	11.21	24.09	6.31	40.93	2:16.24	6211	17
Kendell Williams	Points	1118	1016	609	972	946	685	875	6211	17

== Badminton ==
The United States qualified a total of seven badminton players for each of the following events into the Olympic tournament. Howard Shu and Iris Wang were selected among the top 34 individual shuttlers each in the men's and women's singles, while the men's, women's, and mixed doubles players picked up the continental spot each as the highest-ranked pairs coming from the America zone in the BWF World Rankings as of May 5, 2016.

Athlete	Event	Group Stage				Elimination	Quarterfinal	Semifinal	Final / BM	
Athlete	Event	Opposition Score	Opposition Score	Opposition Score	Rank	Opposition Score	Opposition Score	Opposition Score	Opposition Score	Rank
Howard Shu	Men's singles	Sugiarto (INA); L 14–21, 10–21	Guerrero (CUB); L 16–21, 15–21	—N/a	3	Did not advance				
Phillip Chew; Sattawat Pongnairat	Men's doubles	Fu / Zhang (CHN); L 6–21, 7–21	Goh / Tan (MAS); L 12–21, 10–21	Fuchs / Schöttler (GER); L 14–21, 14–21	4	—N/a	Did not advance			
Iris Wang	Women's singles	Tan (BEL); W 21–17, 20–22, 21–14	Santos (POR); W 18–21, 21–10, 21–12	Li (CHN); L 16–21, 12–21	2	Did not advance				
Eva Lee; Paula Lynn Obañana	Women's doubles	Jung / Shin (KOR); L 14–21, 12–21	Juhl / Pedersen (DEN); L 9–21, 6–21	Luo Y / Luo Yu (CHN); L 14–21, 15–21	4	—N/a	Did not advance			
Phillip Chew; Jamie Subandhi	Mixed doubles	Ko / Kim (KOR); L 10–21, 12–21	Kazuno / Kurihara (JPN); L 6–21, 12–21	Arends / Piek (NED); L 15–21, 19–21	4	—N/a	Did not advance			

== Basketball ==
Summary

Team	Event	Group Stage						Quarterfinal	Semifinal	Final / BM	
Team	Event	Opposition Score	Opposition Score	Opposition Score	Opposition Score	Opposition Score	Rank	Opposition Score	Opposition Score	Opposition Score	Rank
United States men's	Men's tournament	China; W 119–62	Venezuela; W 113–69	Australia; W 98–88	Serbia; W 94–91	France; W 100–97	1 Q	Argentina; W 105–78	Spain; W 82–76	Serbia; W 96–66	1st place, gold medalist(s)
United States women's	Women's tournament	Senegal; W 121–56	Spain; W 103–63	Serbia; W 110–84	Canada; W 81–51	China; W 105–62	1 Q	Japan; W 110–64	France; W 86–67	Spain; W 101–72	1st place, gold medalist(s)

=== Men's tournament ===
The U.S. men's basketball team qualified for the Olympics by winning the 2014 FIBA Basketball World Cup.

Team roster The following is the United States roster in the men's basketball tournament of the 2016 Summer Olympics.

United States men's national basketball team – 2016 Summer Olympics roster
Players
Coaches

Pos.	No.	Name	Age – Date of birth	Height	Club	Ctr.
G	4	Jimmy Butler	26 – September 14, 1989	6 ft 7 in (2.01 m)	Chicago Bulls	(United States)
F	5	Kevin Durant	27 – September 29, 1988	6 ft 10 in (2.08 m)	Golden State Warriors	(United States)
C	6	DeAndre Jordan	28 – July 21, 1988	6 ft 11 in (2.11 m)	Los Angeles Clippers	(United States)
G	7	Kyle Lowry	30 – March 25, 1986	6 ft 0 in (1.83 m)	Toronto Raptors	(Canada)
F	8	Harrison Barnes	24 – May 30, 1992	6 ft 8 in (2.03 m)	Dallas Mavericks	(United States)
G	9	DeMar DeRozan	26 – August 7, 1989	6 ft 7 in (2.01 m)	Toronto Raptors	(Canada)
G	10	Kyrie Irving	24 – March 23, 1992	6 ft 3 in (1.91 m)	Cleveland Cavaliers	(United States)
G	11	Klay Thompson	26 – February 8, 1990	6 ft 7 in (2.01 m)	Golden State Warriors	(United States)
C	12	DeMarcus Cousins	25 – August 13, 1990	6 ft 10 in (2.08 m)	Sacramento Kings	(United States)
F	13	Paul George	26 – May 2, 1990	6 ft 9 in (2.06 m)	Indiana Pacers	(United States)
F	14	Draymond Green	26 – March 4, 1990	6 ft 6 in (1.98 m)	Golden State Warriors	(United States)
F	15	Carmelo Anthony	32 – May 29, 1984	6 ft 7 in (2.01 m)	New York Knicks	(United States)

Head coach

- Mike Krzyzewski

Assistant coach(es)

- Jim Boeheim
- Tom Thibodeau
- Monty Williams
- Jerry Colangelo (executive director)

Legend

- Club – describes last
  club before the tournament
- Age – describes age
  on August 6, 2016

Group play

Pos	Team	Pld	W	L	PF	PA	PD	Pts	Qualification
1	United States	5	5	0	524	407	+117	10	Quarterfinals
2	Australia	5	4	1	444	368	+76	9	Quarterfinals
3	France	5	3	2	423	378	+45	8	Quarterfinals
4	Serbia	5	2	3	426	387	+39	7	Quarterfinals
5	Venezuela	5	1	4	315	444	−129	6	
6	China	5	0	5	318	466	−148	5	

Source: FIBA
Rules for classification: 1) points; 2) head-to-head points; 3) head-to-head points difference; 4) head-to-head number of points scored.

6 August 2016
19:00

Boxscore

China	62–119	United States
Scoring by quarter: 10–30, 20–29, 17–32, 15–28
Pts: Yi 25; Rebs: Yi, Zhao 6 Asts: Zhao 5		Pts: Durant 25; Rebs: Anthony, Jordan 7 Asts: Durant 6

Carioca Arena 1, Rio de Janeiro
Attendance: 10,622
Referees: Stephen Seibel (CAN), Oļegs Latiševs (LAT), Sreten Radović (CRO)

8 August 2016
19:00

Boxscore

United States	113–69	Venezuela
Scoring by quarter: 18–18, 30–8, 27–25, 38–18
Pts: George 20; Rebs: Jordan 9 Asts: Lowry 9		Pts: Cox 19; Rebs: Echenique 7 Asts: Vargas 5

Carioca Arena 1, Rio de Janeiro
Attendance: 10,572
Referees: Eddie Viator (FRA), Damir Javor (SLO), Scott Beker (AUS)

10 August 2016
19:00

Boxscore

Australia	88–98	United States
Scoring by quarter: 29–29, 25–20, 13–21, 21–28
Pts: Mills 30; Rebs: Dellavedova 6 Asts: Dellavedova 11		Pts: Anthony 31; Rebs: Anthony, Cousins 8 Asts: Irving 5

Carioca Arena 1, Rio de Janeiro
Attendance: 10,957
Referees: Christos Christodoulou (GRE), Juan Carlos García (ESP), Robert Lottermoser (GER)

12 August 2016
19:00

Boxscore

United States	94–91	Serbia
Scoring by quarter: 27–15, 23–26, 22–21, 22–29
Pts: Irving 15; Rebs: George 9 Asts: Irving, Cousins 5		Pts: Jokić 25; Rebs: Jokić 6 Asts: Teodosić 6

Carioca Arena 1, Rio de Janeiro
Attendance: 11,413
Referees: Stephen Seibel (CAN), Guilherme Locatelli (BRA), Piotr Pastusiak (POL)

14 August 2016
14:15

Boxscore

United States	100–97	France
Scoring by quarter: 30–24, 25–22, 26–23, 19–28
Pts: Thompson 30; Rebs: Durant 6 Asts: Irving 12		Pts: de Colo, Heurtel 18; Rebs: Heurtel 8 Asts: Heurtel 9

Carioca Arena 1, Rio de Janeiro
Attendance: 11,302
Referees: Borys Ryzhyk (UKR), José Reyes (MEX), Damir Javor (SLO)

Quarterfinal

17 August 2016
18:45

Boxscore

United States	105–78	Argentina
Scoring by quarter: 25–21, 31–19, 31–21, 18–17
Pts: Durant 27; Rebs: George 8 Asts: Durant 6		Pts: Scola 15; Rebs: Scola 10; Asts: Campazzo 9

Carioca Arena 1, Rio de Janeiro
Attendance: 11,700
Referees: Ilija Belošević (SRB), Guilherme Locatelli (BRA), Robert Lottermoser (GER)

Semifinal

19 August 2016
15:30

Boxscore

Spain	76–82	United States
Scoring by quarter: 17–26, 22–19, 18–21, 19–16
Pts: Gasol 23; Rebs: Gasol 8 Asts: Rodríguez 5		Pts: Thompson 22; Rebs: Jordan 16; Asts: Lowry, Thompson 3

Carioca Arena 1, Rio de Janeiro
Attendance: 10,455
Referees: Christos Christodoulou (GRE), José Reyes (MEX), Guilherme Locatelli (BRA)

Gold medal match

21 August 2016
15:45

Boxscore

Serbia	66–96	United States
Scoring by quarter: 15–19, 14–33, 14–27, 23–17
Pts: Nedović 14; Rebs: Jokić 4 Asts: three players 3		Pts: Durant 30; Rebs: Cousins 15; Asts: Lowry 5

Carioca Arena 1, Rio de Janeiro
Attendance: 10,658
Referees: José Reyes (MEX), Borys Ryzhyk (UKR), Juan García (SPA)

=== Women's tournament ===
The U.S. women's basketball team qualified for the Olympics by winning the 2014 FIBA World Championships.

Team roster
The following was the United States roster for the women's basketball tournament of the 2016 Summer Olympics.

United States women's national basketball team – 2016 Summer Olympics roster
Players
Coaches

Pos.	No.	Name	Age – Date of birth	Height	Club	Ctr.
G	4	Lindsay Whalen	34 – May 9, 1982	5 ft 9 in (1.75 m)	Minnesota Lynx	(United States)
F	5	Seimone Augustus	32 – April 30, 1984	6 ft 0 in (1.83 m)	Minnesota Lynx	(United States)
G	6	Sue Bird	35 – October 16, 1980	5 ft 9 in (1.75 m)	Seattle Storm	(United States)
F	7	Maya Moore	27 – June 11, 1989	6 ft 0 in (1.83 m)	Minnesota Lynx	(United States)
F	8	Angel McCoughtry	29 – September 10, 1986	6 ft 1 in (1.85 m)	Atlanta Dream	(United States)
F/C	9	Breanna Stewart	21 – August 27, 1994	6 ft 4 in (1.93 m)	Seattle Storm	(United States)
F	10	Tamika Catchings	37 – July 21, 1979	6 ft 1 in (1.85 m)	Indiana Fever	(United States)
G/F	11	Elena Delle Donne	26 – September 5, 1989	6 ft 5 in (1.96 m)	Chicago Sky	(United States)
G	12	Diana Taurasi	34 – June 11, 1982	6 ft 0 in (1.83 m)	Phoenix Mercury	(United States)
C	13	Sylvia Fowles	30 – October 6, 1985	6 ft 6 in (1.98 m)	Minnesota Lynx	(United States)
C	14	Tina Charles	27 – December 5, 1988	6 ft 4 in (1.93 m)	New York Liberty	(United States)
C	15	Brittney Griner	25 – October 18, 1990	6 ft 8 in (2.03 m)	Phoenix Mercury	(United States)

Head coach

- Geno Auriemma

Assistant coach(es)

- Doug Bruno
- Cheryl Reeve
- Dawn Staley
- Jerry Colangelo (executive director)

Legend

- Club – describes last
  club before the tournament
- Age – describes age
  on August 6, 2016

Group play

Pos	Team	Pld	W	L	PF	PA	PD	Pts	Qualification
1	United States	5	5	0	520	316	+204	10	Quarter-finals
2	Spain	5	4	1	387	333	+54	9	Quarter-finals
3	Canada	5	3	2	340	347	−7	8	Quarter-finals
4	Serbia	5	2	3	385	406	−21	7	Quarter-finals
5	China	5	1	4	371	428	−57	6	
6	Senegal	5	0	5	309	482	−173	5	

Source: FIBA
Rules for classification: 1) points; 2) head-to-head points; 3) head-to-head points difference; 4) head-to-head number of points scored.

7 August 2016
12:00

Boxscore

United States	121–56	Senegal
Scoring by quarter: 35–9, 29–12, 30–17, 27–18
Pts: three players 15; Rebs: Fowles, Griner 7 Asts: Bird 8		Pts: Dieng 10; Rebs: Diarra, Ay. Traoré 5 Asts: Dieng 4

Youth Arena, Rio de Janeiro
Attendance: 2,219
Referees: Cristiano Maranho (BRA), Ahmed Al-Bulushi (OMA), Nadege Zouzou (CIV)

8 August 2016
12:00

Boxscore

Spain	63–103	United States
Scoring by quarter: 14–29, 23–25, 14–20, 12–29
Pts: Torrens 20; Rebs: Ndour 8 Asts: Domínguez 3		Pts: Taurasi 13; Rebs: Charles 6 Asts: Bird, Charles 5

Youth Arena, Rio de Janeiro
Attendance: 2,073
Referees: Christos Christodoulou (GRE), Sreten Radović (CRO), Ahmed Al-Bulushi (OMA)

10 August 2016
15:30

Boxscore

United States	110–84	Serbia
Scoring by quarter: 31–21, 25–13, 28–27, 26–23
Pts: Taurasi 25; Rebs: Charles 8 Asts: Taurasi 6		Pts: three players 15; Rebs: A. Dabović 5 Asts: A. Dabović, M. Dabović 4

Youth Arena, Rio de Janeiro
Attendance: 2,490
Referees: Piotr Pastusiak (POL), Scott Beker (AUS), Nadege Zouzou (CIV)

12 August 2016
15:30

Boxscore

Canada	51–81	United States
Scoring by quarter: 16–18, 6–18, 14–24, 15–21
Pts: Ayim 8 Rebs: Raincock-Ekunwe 8 Asts: Langlois, Tatham 3		Pts: Moore, Taurasi 12; Rebs: Moore 8 Asts: Bird 9

Youth Arena, Rio de Janeiro
Attendance: 3,138
Referees: Eddie Viator (FRA), Vaughan Mayberry (AUS), Ahmed Al-Bulushi (OMA)

14 August 2016
12:15

Boxscore

China	62–105	United States
Scoring by quarter: 9–32, 17–28, 14–18, 22–27
Pts: Sun Mengr. 16; Rebs: Chen X. 6 Asts: Chen X. 6		Pts: Charles, Griner 18; Rebs: Griner 13; Asts: Moore 8

Youth Arena, Rio de Janeiro
Attendance: 2,957
Referees: Ferdinand Pascual (PHI), Robert Lottermoser (GER), Chahinaz Boussetta (MAR)

Quarterfinal

16 August 2016
18:45

Boxscore

United States	110–64	Japan
Scoring by quarter: 30–23, 26–23, 25–13, 29–5
Pts: Moore, Taurasi 19; Rebs: Griner 7 Asts: Charles 5		Pts: Tokashiki 14; Rebs: four players 3 Asts: Yoshida 8

Carioca Arena 1, Rio de Janeiro
Attendance: 7,471
Referees: Carlos Peruga (ESP), Duan Zhu (CHN), Carlos Júlio (ANG)

Semifinal

18 August 2016
19:00

Boxscore

France	67–86	United States
Scoring by quarter: 15–19, 21–21, 8–25, 23–21
Pts: Yacoubou 14; Rebs: Gruda 6 Asts: Michel 3		Pts: Taurasi 18; Rebs: Fowles 9 Asts: Taurasi 4

Carioca Arena 1, Rio de Janeiro
Attendance: 8,431
Referees: Ferdinand Pascual (PHI), Karen Lasuik (CAN), Duan Zhu (CHN)

Gold medal game

20 August 2016
15:30

Boxscore

(gold) United States	101–72	Spain (silver)
Scoring by quarter: 21–17, 28–15, 32–17, 20–23
Pts: Whalen, Taurasi 17; Rebs: Charles, Griner 7 Asts: Whalen 6		Pts: Torrens 18; Rebs: Torrens, Ndour 5 Asts: Torrens, Cruz 4

Carioca Arena 1, Rio de Janeiro
Attendance: 9,586
Referees: Eddie Viator (FRA), Piotr Pastusiak (POL), Hwang In-tae (KOR)

== Boxing ==
Eight U.S. boxers were entered to compete in each of the following weight classes into the Olympic tournament. Carlos Balderas was the only U.S. boxer finishing among the top two of his respective division in the World Series of Boxing. Meanwhile, four U.S. boxers (Hernandez, Stevenson, Conwell, and Mayer) claimed their Olympic spots at the 2016 American Qualification Tournament in Buenos Aires, Argentina.

London 2012 middleweight champion Claressa Shields was the only U.S. female boxer to receive her Olympic spot with a quarterfinal victory at the World Championships in Astana, Kazakhstan. Antonio Vargas and Gary Antuanne Russell were the only Americans to secure additional places on the boxing team at the 2016 AIBA World Qualifying Tournament in Baku, Azerbaijan.

Boxers also had to compete at the Olympic Trials in Reno, Nevada to assure their selection to the U.S. team for the Games.

Men

Athlete	Event	Round of 32	Round of 16	Quarterfinals	Semifinals	Final	
Athlete	Event	Opposition Result	Opposition Result	Opposition Result	Opposition Result	Opposition Result	Rank
Nico Hernández	Light flyweight	Cappai (ITA); W 3–0	Yegorov (RUS); W 3–0	Quipo (ECU); W 3–0	Dusmatov (UZB); L 0–3	Did not advance	3rd place, bronze medalist(s)
Antonio Vargas	Flyweight	Neto (BRA); W 2–0	Zoirov (UZB); L 0–3	Did not advance			
Shakur Stevenson	Bantamweight	Bye	de Jesus (BRA); W 3–0	Tsendbaatar (MGL); W 3–0	Nikitin (RUS); W WO	Ramírez (CUB); L 1–2	2nd place, silver medalist(s)
Carlos Balderas	Lightweight	Abdrakhamanov (KAZ); W 3–0	Narimatsu (JPN); W 3–0	Álvarez (CUB); L 0–3	Did not advance		
Gary Antuanne Russell	Light welterweight	Hitchens (HAI); W 3–0	Masuk (THA); W 2–1	Gaibnazarov (UZB); L 1–2	Did not advance		
Charles Conwell	Middleweight	Yadav (IND); L 0–3	Did not advance				

Women

Athlete	Event	Round of 16	Quarterfinals	Semifinals	Final	
Athlete	Event	Opposition Result	Opposition Result	Opposition Result	Opposition Result	Rank
Mikaela Mayer	Lightweight	Chieng (FSM); W 3–0	Belyakova (RUS); L 0–2	Did not advance		
Claressa Shields	Middleweight	Bye	Yakushina (RUS); W 3–0	Shakimova (KAZ); W 3–0	Fontijn (NED); W 3–0	1st place, gold medalist(s)

== Canoeing ==
=== Slalom ===
U.S. canoeists qualified boats for the following events based on their performances from the 2015 Pan American Games and the World Championships. Apart from the Worlds, they also had to compete in each of the following distances at two selection stages of the Olympic Trials to assure their selection to the U.S. team for Rio 2016.

Athlete	Event	Preliminary						Semifinal		Final	
Athlete	Event	Run 1	Rank	Run 2	Rank	Best	Rank	Time	Rank	Time	Rank
Casey Eichfeld	Men's C-1	100.02	8	101.23	10	100.02	12 Q	101.23	10 Q	99.69	7
Casey Eichfeld; Devin McEwan	Men's C-2	112.33	8	117.19	9	112.33	10 Q	116.26	10 Q	117.85	10
Michal Smolen	Men's K-1	92.96	11	90.13	6	90.13	10 Q	97.87	12	Did not advance	
Ashley Nee	Women's K-1	113.15	14	105.60	6	105.60	9 Q	116.59	14	Did not advance	

=== Sprint ===
The United States qualified a single boat in the women's K-1 500 m for the Games at the 2016 Pan American Sprint Qualifier in Gainesville, Georgia, as the quota spot had been passed to the highest finisher not yet qualified.

Athlete	Event	Heats		Semifinals		Final	
Athlete	Event	Time	Rank	Time	Rank	Time	Rank
Maggie Hogan	Women's K-1 200 m	44.668	7	Did not advance			
Maggie Hogan	Women's K-1 500 m	1:58.970	6	Did not advance			

Qualification Legend: FA = Qualify to final (medal); FB = Qualify to final B (non-medal)

== Cycling ==
=== Road ===
U.S. riders qualified for the following quota places in the men's and women's Olympic road races by virtue of their top 5 final national ranking in the 2015 UCI America Tour (for men) and top 22 in the 2016 UCI World Ranking (for women). As no men qualified automatically through a podium finish at a UCI World Tour event or a top-15 ranking in the UCI World Ranking, USA Cycling filled the quota spots via selection committee on June 23, 2016. The selection committee also nominated all four women athletes to the Games directly after all opportunities for automatic qualification had passed.

Men

Athlete	Event	Time	Rank
Brent Bookwalter	Road race	6:13:36	16
Taylor Phinney	Road race	Did not finish	
Brent Bookwalter	Time trial	1:17:57.61	23
Taylor Phinney	Time trial	1:17:25.31	22

Women

Athlete	Event	Time	Rank
Mara Abbott	Road race	3:51:31	4
Kristin Armstrong	Road race	Did not finish	
Megan Guarnier	Road race	3:52:41	11
Evelyn Stevens	Road race	3:52:43	12
Kristin Armstrong	Time trial	44:26.42	1st place, gold medalist(s)
Evelyn Stevens	Time trial	46:00.08	10

=== Track ===
Following the completion of the 2016 UCI Track Cycling World Championships, U.S. riders had accumulated spots in the women's team pursuit, as well as both the men's and women's omnium. Although the United States failed to earn a place in either men's or women's team sprint, they managed to secure an outright berth in the men's keirin, by virtue of their final individual UCI Olympic ranking in that event.

Two-time Olympic silver medalist Sarah Hammer automatically earned a selection to the U.S. track cycling team in the women's omnium with a superb runner-up finish at the 2016 UCI World Championships in London. The full U.S. Olympic track cycling squad was named on March 18, 2016.

Pursuit

Athlete	Event	Qualification		Semifinals		Final	
Athlete	Event	Time	Rank	Opponent Results	Rank	Opponent Results	Rank
Kelly Catlin; Chloé Dygert; Sarah Hammer; Jennifer Valente	Women's team pursuit	4:14.286	2 Q	Australia; 4:12.282 WR	1 Q	Great Britain; 4:12.454	2nd place, silver medalist(s)

Keirin

Athlete	Event	1st Round	Repechage	2nd Round	Final
Athlete	Event	Rank	Rank	Rank	Rank
Matthew Baranoski	Men's keirin	5 R	3	Did not advance	

Omnium

Athlete	Event	Scratch race		Individual pursuit			Elimination race		Time trial			Flying lap			Points race		Total points	Rank
Athlete	Event	Rank	Points	Time	Rank	Points	Rank	Points	Time	Rank	Points	Time	Rank	Points	Points	Rank	Total points	Rank
Bobby Lea	Men's omnium	17	8	4:23.942	8	26	11	20	1:05.339	14	14	13.416	12	18	−40	DNF	46	17
Sarah Hammer	Women's omnium	4	34	3:26.988	2	38	3	36	35.366	5	32	14.081	5	32	34	6	206	2nd place, silver medalist(s)

=== Mountain biking ===
U.S. mountain bikers qualified for one men's and two women's quota places into the Olympic cross-country race, as a result of the nation's fifteenth-place finish for men and fifth for women, respectively, in the UCI Olympic Ranking List of May 25, 2016. The qualification period for mountain biking ended June 20, 2016, and as no bikers qualified automatically through top finishes at UCI Elite World Cup Cross-Country events or through the UCI World Ranking system, USA Cycling made official nominations via selection committee on June 23, 2016.

Athlete	Event	Time	Rank
Howard Grotts	Men's cross-country	LAP (1 lap)	38
Lea Davison	Women's cross-country	1:33:27	7
Chloe Woodruff	Women's cross-country	1:36:17	14

=== BMX ===
U.S. riders received three men's and two women's quota spots for BMX at the 2016 Summer Olympics. Two cyclists qualified by finishing in the top three at the 2016 UCI BMX World Championships. USA Cycling held an Olympic trial on June 11, 2016, to decide the second men's berth. The final two bikers were nominated via selection committee and announced on June 23, 2016.

Athlete	Event	Seeding		Quarterfinal		Semifinal		Final	
Athlete	Event	Result	Rank	Points	Rank	Points	Rank	Result	Rank
Connor Fields	Men's BMX	34.768	4	8	2 Q	6	2 Q	34.642	1st place, gold medalist(s)
Nicholas Long	Men's BMX	35.088	9	9	3 Q	12	4 Q	35.522	4
Corben Sharrah	Men's BMX	34.893	5	9	3 Q	12	5	Did not advance	
Brooke Crain	Women's BMX	35.345	7	—N/a		7	2 Q	35.520	4
Alise Post	Women's BMX	35.509	8	—N/a		8	2 Q	34.435	2nd place, silver medalist(s)

== Diving ==
U.S. divers qualified for seven individual spots and three synchronized teams at the Olympics through the 2015 FINA World Championships, and the 2016 FINA World Cup series. Divers had to attain a top two finish in the individual events and accumulate the highest score as a pair in each of the synchronized events at the 2016 U.S. Olympic Trials, held in Indianapolis, Indiana (June 18 to 26), to assure their coveted selection to the Olympic team.

Men

Athlete	Event	Preliminaries		Semifinals		Final	
Athlete	Event	Points	Rank	Points	Rank	Points	Rank
Michael Hixon	3 m springboard	421.60	10 Q	467.25	4 Q	431.65	10
Kristian Ipsen	3 m springboard	461.35	3 Q	437.70	7 Q	475.80	5
David Boudia	10 m platform	496.55	4 Q	458.35	10 Q	525.25	3rd place, bronze medalist(s)
Steele Johnson	10 m platform	403.75	18 Q	447.85	13	Did not advance	
Sam Dorman; Michael Hixon	3 m synchronized springboard	—N/a				450.21	2nd place, silver medalist(s)
David Boudia; Steele Johnson	10 m synchronized platform	—N/a				457.11	2nd place, silver medalist(s)

Women

Athlete	Event	Preliminaries		Semifinals		Final	
Athlete	Event	Points	Rank	Points	Rank	Points	Rank
Kassidy Cook	3 m springboard	327.75	8 Q	304.35	13	Did not advance	
Abby Johnston	3 m springboard	333.60	6 Q	324.75	=5 Q	302.85	12
Jessica Parratto	10 m platform	346.80	3 Q	367.00	2 Q	344.60	10
Katrina Young	10 m platform	313.85	12 Q	301.45	13	Did not advance	
Amy Cozad; Jessica Parratto	10 m synchronized platform	—N/a				301.02	7

== Equestrian ==
U.S. equestrians qualified a full squad in the team dressage, eventing, and jumping competitions through the 2014 FEI World Equestrian Games and the 2015 Pan American Games.

Dressage
The long list for the dressage team was published on May 3. The final team was named in late June, after several observation trials in Compiègne, Roosendaal and Rotterdam. The final U.S. dressage team was named on June 27, 2016.

Athlete	Horse	Event	Grand Prix		Grand Prix Special		Grand Prix Freestyle		Overall	
Athlete	Horse	Event	Score	Rank	Score	Rank	Technical	Artistic	Score	Rank
Allison Brock	Rosevelt	Individual	72.686	25 Q	73.824	19 Q	74.464	77.857	76.160	15
Laura Graves	Verdades	Individual	78.071	5 Q	80.644	5 Q	81.964	85.196	88.429	4
Kasey Perry-Glass	Dublet	Individual	75.229	17 Q	73.235	22	Did not advance			
Steffen Peters	Legolas	Individual	77.614	6 Q	74.622	14 Q	76.500	82.286	79.393	12
Allison Brock; Laura Graves; Kasey Perry-Glass; Steffen Peters	See above	Team	76.971	3 Q	76.363	3	—N/a		76.667	3rd place, bronze medalist(s)

Eventing
The U.S. eventing team was named on June 20, 2016, with Phillip Dutton going to his sixth Olympics.

Athlete	Horse	Event	Dressage		Cross-country			Jumping						Total	
Athlete	Horse	Event	Dressage		Cross-country			Qualifier			Final			Total	
Athlete	Horse	Event	Penalties	Rank	Penalties	Total	Rank	Penalties	Total	Rank	Penalties	Total	Rank	Penalties	Rank
Phillip Dutton	Mighty Nice	Individual	43.60	15	3.20	46.80	5	1.00	47.80	4 Q	4.00	51.80	3	51.80	3rd place, bronze medalist(s)
Lauren Kieffer	Veronica	Individual	47.30	33	Eliminated			Did not advance							
Boyd Martin	Blackfoot Mystery	Individual	~~47.70~~	35	3.20	50.90	6	8.00	58.90	7 Q	12.00	70.90	16	70.90	16
Clark Montgomery	Loughan Glen	Individual	46.60	24	Withdrew			Did not advance							
Phillip Dutton; Lauren Kieffer; Boyd Martin; Clark Montgomery	See above	Team	137.50	6	Eliminated			Did not advance			—N/a			Did not advance	

Jumping
The U.S. jumping team was named on June 29, 2016, with double gold medalists Beezie Madden and McLain Ward going to their fourth straight Olympics.

Athlete	Horse	Event	Qualification								Final					Total	
Athlete	Horse	Event	Round 1		Round 2			Round 3			Round A		Round B			Total	
Athlete	Horse	Event	Penalties	Rank	Penalties	Total	Rank	Penalties	Total	Rank	Penalties	Rank	Penalties	Total	Rank	Penalties	Rank
Lucy Davis	Barron	Individual	4	=27 Q	0	4	=15 Q	4	8	=18 Q	12	=32	Did not advance			12	=32
Kent Farrington	Voyeur	Individual	0	=1 Q	0	0	=1 Q	1	1	=2 Q	0	=1 Q	0	0	=1 JO^{[d]}	8	5
Beezie Madden	Cortes 'C'	Individual	~~4~~	=27 Q	~~8~~	12	=46	Did not advance									
McLain Ward	Azur	Individual	4	=27 Q	0	4	=15 Q	0	4	=7 Q	4	=16 Q	0	4	=9	4	=9
Lucy Davis; Kent Farrington; Beezie Madden; McLain Ward	See above	Team	8	=8	0	—N/a	=1 Q	5	5	2	—N/a					5	2nd place, silver medalist(s)

^{d} Multiple riders finished with 0 penalties at the end of the finals round B and a jump-off was held to determine medals.

== Fencing ==
U.S. fencers qualified a full squad each in the men's team foil and women's team sabre by virtue of their top four national finish in the FIE Olympic Team Rankings, while the women's épée team claimed the spot as the highest ranking team from America outside the world's top four.

In February 2016, Mariel Zagunis, a double Olympic champion (2004 and 2008), and Ibtihaj Muhammad, the first U.S. athlete to compete at the Games in a hijab, were the first two fencers to earn selection to the U.S. Olympic team by finishing in the top two of the national women's sabre team rankings. They were eventually joined by men's foil (Massialas, Meinhardt, and Chamley-Watson) and women's épée (Holmes and Hurley sisters) a few weeks later. Sabre fencers Eli Dershwitz and Daryl Homer, along with London 2012 Olympians Lee Kiefer and Nzingha Prescod, both in women's foil, claimed their spots on the U.S. team by finishing among the top 14 in the FIE Adjusted Official Rankings, while Jason Pryor did so as the top-ranked men's épée fencer from the America zone.

The full U.S. Olympic team was announced on April 11, 2016, at the USA Fencing Division I National Championships in Richmond, Virginia.

Men

Athlete	Event	Round of 64	Round of 32	Round of 16	Quarterfinal	Semifinal	Final / BM	
Athlete	Event	Opposition Score	Opposition Score	Opposition Score	Opposition Score	Opposition Score	Opposition Score	Rank
Jason Pryor	Épée	Bye	Steffen (SUI); L 14–15	Did not advance				
Miles Chamley-Watson	Foil	Bye	Akhmatkhuzin (RUS); L 13–15	Did not advance				
Alexander Massialas	Foil	Bye	Essam (EGY); W 15–7	Akhmatkhuzin (RUS); W 15–9	Avola (ITA); W 15–14	Kruse (GBR); W 15–9	Garozzo (ITA); L 11–15	2nd place, silver medalist(s)
Gerek Meinhardt	Foil	Bye	van Haaster (CAN); W 15–4	Le Péchoux (FRA); W 15–14	Kruse (GBR); L 13–15	Did not advance		
Miles Chamley-Watson; Race Imboden; Alexander Massialas; Gerek Meinhardt	Team foil	—N/a			Egypt; W 45–37	Russia; L 41–45	Italy; W 45–31	3rd place, bronze medalist(s)
Eli Dershwitz	Sabre	—N/a	van Holsbeke (BEL); L 12–15	Did not advance				
Daryl Homer	Sabre	—N/a	Mokretsov (KAZ); W 15–11	Hartung (GER); W 15–12	Szabo (GER); W 15–12	Abedini (IRI); W 15–14	Szilágyi (HUN); L 8–15	2nd place, silver medalist(s)

Women

Athlete	Event	Round of 64	Round of 32	Round of 16	Quarterfinal	Semifinal	Final / BM	
Athlete	Event	Opposition Score	Opposition Score	Opposition Score	Opposition Score	Opposition Score	Opposition Score	Rank
Katharine Holmes	Épée	Bye	Kirpu (EST); L 4–5	Did not advance				
Courtney Hurley	Épée	Bye	Shemyakina (UKR); L 13–14	Did not advance				
Kelley Hurley	Épée	Bye	Moellhausen (BRA); L 12–15	Did not advance				
Katharine Holmes; Courtney Hurley; Kelley Hurley	Team épée	—N/a		Bye	Romania; L 23–24	Classification semifinal France; W 32–28	5th place final South Korea; W 22–18	5
Lee Kiefer	Foil	Bye	Shaito (LIB); W 15–3	Liu (CHN); L 9–15	Did not advance			
Nzingha Prescod	Foil	Bye	Michel (MEX); W 15–9	Guyart (FRA); L 11–14	Did not advance			
Ibtihaj Muhammad	Sabre	Bye	Kravatska (UKR); W 15–13	Berder (FRA); L 12–15	Did not advance			
Dagmara Wozniak	Sabre	Bye	Vougiouka (GRE); L 8–15	Did not advance				
Mariel Zagunis	Sabre	Bye	Grench (PAN); W 15–4	Dyachenko (RUS); L 12–15	Did not advance			
Monica Aksamit; Ibtihaj Muhammad; Dagmara Wozniak; Mariel Zagunis	Team sabre	—N/a			Poland; W 45–43	Russia; L 42–45	Italy; W 45–30	3rd place, bronze medalist(s)

== Field hockey ==
Summary

Key:
- FT – After full time.
- P – Match decided by penalty-shootout.

Team	Event	Group Stage						Quarterfinal	Semifinal	Final / BM	
Team	Event	Opposition Score	Opposition Score	Opposition Score	Opposition Score	Opposition Score	Rank	Opposition Score	Opposition Score	Opposition Score	Rank
United States women's	Women's tournament	Argentina; W 2–1	Australia; W 2–1	Japan; W 6–1	India; W 3–0	Great Britain; L 1–2	2	Germany; L 1–2	Did not advance		5

=== Women's tournament ===
U.S. women's field hockey team qualified for the Olympics by winning the 2015 Pan American Games.

Team roster
The following is the United States roster in the women's field hockey tournament of the 2016 Summer Olympics.

Head coach: Craig Parnham

2. Stefanie Fee
5. Melissa González
7. Kelsey Kolojejchick
8. Rachel Dawson
9. Michelle Vittese
10. Jill Witmer
12. Julia Reinprecht
14. Katie Reinprecht
16. Katie O'Donnell
18. Michelle Kasold
23. Katelyn Falgowski
24. Kathleen Sharkey
27. Lauren Crandall
28. Caitlin Van Snickle
29. Alyssa Manley
31. Jaclyn Briggs (GK)

Reserves:

21. Paige Selenski
6. Alesha Widdall (GK)

Group play

Pos	Team	Pld	W	D	L	GF	GA	GD	Pts	Qualification
1	Great Britain	5	5	0	0	12	4	+8	15	Quarter-finals
2	United States	5	4	0	1	14	5	+9	12	Quarter-finals
3	Australia	5	3	0	2	11	5	+6	9	Quarter-finals
4	Argentina	5	2	0	3	12	6	+6	6	Quarter-finals
5	Japan	5	0	1	4	3	16	−13	1	
6	India	5	0	1	4	3	19	−16	1	

Source: Rio2016
Rules for classification: 1) Points; 2) Matches won; 3) Goal difference; 4) Goals for; 5) Head-to-head result.

6 August 2016
17:00

Argentina	1–2	United States
Merino 56'	Report	K. Reinprecht 35'; Kasold 50'

Umpires:
Michelle Joubert (RSA)
Michelle Meister (GER)

8 August 2016
10:00

Australia	1–2	United States
Slattery 43'	Report	Vittese 25'; Van Sickle 41'

Umpires:
Elena Eskina (RUS)
Carolina de la Fuente (ARG)

10 August 2016
17:00

United States	6–1	Japan
González 1'; Bam 5', 52', 60'; Reinprecht 29'; Witmer 37'	Report	Nakashima 47'

Umpires:
Amber Church (NZL)
Fanneke Alkemade (NED)

11 August 2016
19:30

United States	3–0	India
Bam 14', 42'; González 52'	Report

Umpires:
Melissa Trivic (AUS)
Chieko Soma (JPN)

13 August 2016
18:00

Great Britain	2–1	United States
Bray 53'; Danson 56'	Report	Vittese 39'

Umpires:
Amber Church (NZL)
Irene Presenqui (ARG)

Quarterfinal

15 August 2016
12:30

United States	1–2	Germany
Falgowski 57'	Report	Mävers 8'; Hahn 14'

Umpires:
Carolina de la Fuente (ARG)
Miao Lin (CHN)

== Football (soccer) ==
Summary

Team	Event	Group Stage				Quarterfinal	Semifinal	Final / BM	
Team	Event	Opposition Score	Opposition Score	Opposition Score	Rank	Opposition Score	Opposition Score	Opposition Score	Rank
United States women's	Women's tournament	New Zealand; W 2–0	France; W 1–0	Colombia; D 2–2	1 Q	Sweden; L 1–1 (3–4)	Did not advance		5

=== Women's tournament ===
The U.S. women's soccer team qualified for the Olympics by virtue of a top two finish at and by progressing to the gold medal match of the 2016 CONCACAF Olympic Qualifying Championship in Houston, Texas.

Team roster
Head coach: Jill Ellis

The United States named a squad of 18 players and 4 alternates for the tournament, which was announced on 12 July 2016.

No.	Pos.	Player	Date of birth (age)	Caps	Goals	Club
1	GK	Hope Solo	30 July 1981 (aged 35)	201	0	(United States Soccer Federation) Seattle Reign FC
2	FW	Mallory Pugh	29 April 1998 (aged 18)	16	4	(United States Soccer Federation) Real Colorado
3	MF	Allie Long	13 August 1987 (aged 28)	13	2	(United States Soccer Federation) Portland Thorns FC
4	DF	Becky Sauerbrunn	6 June 1985 (aged 31)	112	0	(United States Soccer Federation) FC Kansas City
5	DF	Kelley O'Hara	4 August 1988 (aged 27)	85	2	(United States Soccer Federation) Sky Blue FC
6	DF	Whitney Engen	28 November 1987 (aged 28)	39	4	(United States Soccer Federation) Boston Breakers
7	DF	Meghan Klingenberg	2 August 1988 (aged 28)	67	3	(United States Soccer Federation) Portland Thorns FC
8	DF	Julie Johnston	6 April 1992 (aged 24)	40	8	(United States Soccer Federation) Chicago Red Stars
9	MF	Lindsey Horan	26 May 1994 (aged 22)	23	3	(United States Soccer Federation) Portland Thorns FC
10	MF	Carli Lloyd (captain)	16 July 1982 (aged 34)	227	90	(United States Soccer Federation) Houston Dash
11	DF	Ali Krieger	28 July 1984 (aged 32)	93	1	(United States Soccer Federation) Washington Spirit
12	FW	Christen Press	29 December 1988 (aged 27)	73	34	(United States Soccer Federation) Chicago Red Stars
13	FW	Alex Morgan	2 July 1989 (aged 27)	115	68	(United States Soccer Federation) Orlando Pride
14	MF	Morgan Brian	26 February 1993 (aged 23)	57	4	(United States Soccer Federation) Houston Dash
15	MF	Megan Rapinoe	5 July 1985 (aged 31)	114	31	(United States Soccer Federation) Seattle Reign FC
16	FW	Crystal Dunn	3 July 1992 (aged 24)	38	15	(United States Soccer Federation) Washington Spirit
17	MF	Tobin Heath	29 May 1988 (aged 28)	121	15	(United States Soccer Federation) Portland Thorns FC
18	GK	Alyssa Naeher	20 April 1988 (aged 28)	7	0	(United States Soccer Federation) Chicago Red Stars

Alternates: Ashlyn Harris, Emily Sonnett, Heather O'Reilly, Samantha Mewis

Group play

Pos	Team	Pld	W	D	L	GF	GA	GD	Pts	Qualification
1	United States	3	2	1	0	5	2	+3	7	Quarter-finals
2	France	3	2	0	1	7	1	+6	6	Quarter-finals
3	New Zealand	3	1	0	2	1	5	−4	3	
4	Colombia	3	0	1	2	2	7	−5	1	

Source: Rio2016 & FIFA
Rules for classification: Tiebreakers
3 August 2016
19:00

United States	2–0	New Zealand
Lloyd 9'; Morgan 46'	Report (Rio2016); Report (FIFA)

Mineirão, Belo Horizonte
Attendance: 10,059
Referee: Kateryna Monzul (Ukraine)

6 August 2016
17:00

United States	1–0	France
Lloyd 64'	Report (Rio2016); Report (FIFA)

Mineirão, Belo Horizonte
Attendance: 11,782
Referee: Claudia Umpierrez (Uruguay)

9 August 2016
19:00 (18:00 UTC–4)

Colombia	2–2	United States
Usme 26', 90'	Report (Rio2016); Report (FIFA)	Dunn 41'; Pugh 59'

Arena da Amazônia, Manaus
Attendance: 30,557
Referee: Teodora Albon (Romania)

Quarterfinal

12 August 2016
13:00

United States	1–1 (a.e.t.)	Sweden
Morgan 77'	Report (Rio2016); Report (FIFA); Report	Blackstenius 61'
Penalties
Morgan (penalty missed); Horan (penalty scored); Lloyd (penalty scored); Brian (penalty scored); Press (penalty missed)	3–4	(penalty scored) Schelin; (penalty scored) Asllani; (penalty missed) Sembrant; (penalty scored) Seger; (penalty scored) Dahlkvist

Estádio Nacional Mané Garrincha, Brasília
Attendance: 13,892
Referee: Anna-Marie Keighley (New Zealand)

== Golf ==
The United States entered a total of seven golfers (four men and three women) into the first Olympic tournament since 1904. Rickie Fowler, Matt Kuchar, Patrick Reed, and Bubba Watson qualified directly among the top 15 players for the men's event, while Stacy Lewis, Gerina Piller, and Lexi Thompson did so for the women's based on the IGF World Rankings as of July 11, 2016.

Men

Athlete	Event	Round 1	Round 2	Round 3	Round 4	Total		
Athlete	Event	Score	Score	Score	Score	Score	Par	Rank
Rickie Fowler	Men's	75	71	64	74	284	E	=37
Matt Kuchar	Men's	69	70	69	63	271	−13	3rd place, bronze medalist(s)
Patrick Reed	Men's	72	69	73	64	278	−6	=11
Bubba Watson	Men's	73	67	67	70	277	−7	=8

Women

Athlete	Event	Round 1	Round 2	Round 3	Round 4	Total		
Athlete	Event	Score	Score	Score	Score	Score	Par	Rank
Stacy Lewis	Women's	70	63	76	66	275	−9	=4
Gerina Piller	Women's	69	67	68	74	278	−6	=11
Lexi Thompson	Women's	68	71	76	66	281	−3	=19

== Gymnastics ==
These Olympic Games marked the first time the United States directly qualified a whole gymnastics team in all three modalities.

=== Artistic ===
The United States fielded a full squad of five gymnasts in both the men's and women's artistic gymnastics events through a top eight finish each in the team all-around at the 2015 World Artistic Gymnastics Championships in Glasgow. The U.S. Olympic Team Trials for men's artistic gymnasts were held on June 23 to 25, 2016 in concurrence with the P&G Gymnastics Championship for women. Meanwhile, the women's Olympic trials were held on July 8 to 10, 2016. John Orozco was originally named to the team, but announced that he suffered a torn anterior cruciate ligament and meniscus in his left knee on July 15 after dismounting from the horizontal bar at a training camp. He was replaced by Danell Leyva.

Men
Team

Athlete	Event	Qualification								Final							
Athlete	Event	Apparatus						Total	Rank	Apparatus						Total	Rank
Athlete	Event	F	PH	R	V	PB	HB	Total	Rank	F	PH	R	V	PB	HB	Total	Rank
Chris Brooks	Team	14.533	12.766	14.566	14.400	15.300	14.766	86.331	19 Q	—N/a		14.666	—N/a	15.100	15.108	—N/a	
Jake Dalton	Team	15.600 Q	—N/a	14.900	15.133	15.166	14.333	—N/a		15.325	—N/a	14.833	15.466	—N/a		—N/a	
Danell Leyva	Team	—N/a	14.533	—N/a		15.600 Q	15.333 Q	—N/a		—N/a	14.333	—N/a		15.533	14.333	—N/a	
Sam Mikulak	Team	15.800 Q	13.100	14.533	15.100	15.375	15.133 Q	89.041	7 Q	14.866	14.733	—N/a	15.366	15.700	15.000	—N/a	
Alexander Naddour	Team	14.700	15.366 Q	15.000	15.100	—N/a				13.566	14.633	14.966	15.033	—N/a		—N/a	
Total	Team	46.100	42.999	44.466	45.333	46.275	45.232	270.405	2 Q	43.757	43.699	44.465	45.865	46.333	44.441	268.560	5

Individual finals

Athlete	Event	Apparatus						Total	Rank
Athlete	Event	F	PH	R	V	PB	HB	Total	Rank
Chris Brooks	All-around	14.600	13.200	14.633	14.933	15.066	15.200	87.632	14
Sam Mikulak	All-around	15.200	14.600	14.366	14.566	15.766	15.133	89.631	7
Jake Dalton	Floor	15.133	—N/a					15.133	6
Sam Mikulak	Floor	14.133	—N/a					14.133	8
Alexander Naddour	Pommel horse	—N/a	15.700	—N/a				15.700	3rd place, bronze medalist(s)
Danell Leyva	Parallel bars	—N/a				15.900	—N/a	15.900	2nd place, silver medalist(s)
Danell Leyva	Horizontal bar	—N/a					15.500	15.500	2nd place, silver medalist(s)
Sam Mikulak	Horizontal bar	—N/a					15.400	15.400	4

Women
Team

Athlete	Event	Qualification						Final					
Athlete	Event	Apparatus				Total	Rank	Apparatus				Total	Rank
Athlete	Event	V	UB	BB	F	Total	Rank	V	UB	BB	F	Total	Rank
Simone Biles	Team	16.050 Q	15.000	15.633 Q	15.733 Q	62.266	1 Q	15.933	14.800	15.300	15.800	—N/a	
Gabby Douglas	Team	15.166	15.766 Q	14.833	14.366	60.131	3	—N/a	15.766	—N/a		—N/a	
Laurie Hernandez	Team	15.200	—N/a	15.366 Q	14.800	—N/a		15.100	—N/a	15.233	14.833	—N/a	
Madison Kocian	Team	—N/a	15.866 Q	—N/a				—N/a	15.933	—N/a		—N/a	
Aly Raisman	Team	15.766	14.733	14.833	15.275 Q	60.607	2 Q	15.833	—N/a	15.000	15.366	—N/a	
Total	Team	46.966	46.632	45.832	45.808	185.238	1 Q	46.866	46.499	45.533	45.999	184.897	1st place, gold medalist(s)

Individual finals

Athlete	Event	Apparatus				Total	Rank
Athlete	Event	V	UB	BB	F	Total	Rank
Simone Biles	All-around	15.866	14.966	15.433	15.933	62.198	1st place, gold medalist(s)
Aly Raisman	All-around	15.633	14.166	14.866	15.433	60.098	2nd place, silver medalist(s)
Simone Biles	Vault	15.966	—N/a			15.966	1st place, gold medalist(s)
Gabby Douglas	Uneven bars	—N/a	15.066	—N/a		15.066	7
Madison Kocian	Uneven bars	—N/a	15.833	—N/a		15.833	2nd place, silver medalist(s)
Simone Biles	Balance beam	—N/a		14.733	—N/a	14.733	3rd place, bronze medalist(s)
Laurie Hernandez	Balance beam	—N/a		15.333	—N/a	15.333	2nd place, silver medalist(s)
Simone Biles	Floor	—N/a			15.966	15.966	1st place, gold medalist(s)
Aly Raisman	Floor	—N/a			15.500	15.500	2nd place, silver medalist(s)

=== Rhythmic ===
A squad of U.S. rhythmic gymnasts qualified for the individual and group all-around by finishing in the top 15 (for individual) and top 10 (for group) at the 2015 World Championships in Stuttgart, Germany. The 2016 USA Gymnastics Championship from June 8–13, 2016 served as the Olympic selection event for the rhythmic gymnastics team.

Individual

Athlete	Event	Qualification						Final					
Athlete	Event	Hoop	Ball	Clubs	Ribbon	Total	Rank	Hoop	Ball	Clubs	Ribbon	Total	Rank
Laura Zeng	Individual	17.650	17.666	17.700	16.825	69.841	11	Did not advance					

Group

Athlete	Event	Qualification				Final			
Athlete	Event	5 ribbons	3 clubs 2 hoops	Total	Rank	5 ribbons	3 clubs 2 hoops	Total	Rank
Kiana Eide; Alisa Kano; Natalie McGiffert; Monica Rokhman; Kristen Shaldybin	Team	13.980	16.316	30.296	14	Did not advance			

=== Trampoline ===
The United States qualified one gymnast each in the men's and women's trampoline by virtue of a top eight finish at the 2016 Olympic Test Event in Rio de Janeiro. The 2016 USA Gymnastics Championships from June 8–13, 2016 served as the Olympic selection event for both men's and women's trampoline.

Athlete	Event	Qualification		Final	
Athlete	Event	Score	Rank	Score	Rank
Logan Dooley	Men's	106.055	11	Did not advance	
Nicole Ahsinger	Women's	95.455	15	Did not advance	

== Judo ==
Six U.S. judokas qualified for each of the following weight classes at the Games. Five of them (three men and two women), led by reigning Olympic champion Kayla Harrison and London 2012 bronze medalist Marti Malloy, were ranked among the top 22 eligible judokas for men and top 14 for women in the IJF World Ranking List of May 30, 2016, while Angelica Delgado at women's half-lightweight (52 kg) earned a continental quota spot from the Pan American region, as the highest-ranked U.S. judoka outside of direct qualifying position. The judo team was formally named to the Olympic roster on June 1, 2016.

Men

Athlete	Event	Round of 64	Round of 32	Round of 16	Quarterfinals	Semifinals	Repechage	Final / BM	
Athlete	Event	Opposition Result	Opposition Result	Opposition Result	Opposition Result	Opposition Result	Opposition Result	Opposition Result	Rank
Nick Delpopolo	−73 kg	Bye	Goumar (NIG); W 100–000	Ganbaatar (MGL); W 010–000	Muki (ISR); L 000–100	Did not advance	Ungvári (HUN); L 000–000 S	Did not advance	7
Travis Stevens	−81 kg	Bye	R Pacek (SWE); W 001–000	Sabirov (UZB); W 101–000	Ivanov (BUL); W 100–000	Tchrikishvili (GEO); W 100–000	Bye	Khalmurzaev (RUS); L 000–100	2nd place, silver medalist(s)
Colton Brown	−90 kg	Bye	Suliman (SUD); W 100–000	Iddir (FRA); L 000–010	Did not advance				

Women

Athlete	Event	Round of 64	Round of 32	Round of 16	Quarterfinals	Semifinals	Repechage	Final / BM	
Athlete	Event	Opposition Result	Opposition Result	Opposition Result	Opposition Result	Opposition Result	Opposition Result	Opposition Result	Rank
Angelica Delgado	−52 kg	—N/a	Tsolmon (MGL); L 003–010	Did not advance					
Marti Malloy	−57 kg	—N/a	Bye	Lien (TPE); L 000–000 S	Did not advance				
Kayla Harrison	−78 kg	—N/a	Bye	Zhang (CHN); W 100–000	Joó (HUN); W 100–000	Velenšek (SLO); W 100–000	Bye	Tcheuméo (FRA); W 100–000	1st place, gold medalist(s)

== Modern pentathlon ==
U.S. modern pentathletes qualified for the following spots to compete in modern pentathlon. 2010 Youth Olympian Nathan Schrimsher secured a selection in the men's event and became the first athlete to qualify for the U.S. Olympic team after obtaining a top three finish and one of the Olympic slots from the Pan American Games. Meanwhile, London 2012 Olympian Margaux Isaksen qualified for the women's modern pentathlon as one of eleven top-ranked individuals in the UIPM World Rankings as of June 1, 2016. Isaksen was joined by her younger sister Isabella in the same event, as UIPM announced the re-allocation of the remaining spots for the Games.

Athlete	Event	Fencing (épée one touch)				Swimming (200 m freestyle)			Riding (show jumping)			Combined: shooting/running (10 m air pistol)/(3200 m)			Total points	Final rank
Athlete	Event	RR	BR	Rank	MP points	Time	Rank	MP points	Penalties	Rank	MP points	Time	Rank	MP Points	Total points	Final rank
Nathan Schrimsher	Men's	20–15	0	10	220	2:00.87	7	338	18	18	282	12:01.76	17	610	1450	10
Isabella Isaksen	Women's	20–15	1	8	221	2:20.20	24	280	15	18	285	14:52.96	33	469	1255	25
Margaux Isaksen	Women's	18–17	1	14	209	2:19.91	23	281	7	10	293	14:27.90	27	497	1280	20

== Rowing ==
U.S. rowers qualified 11 out of 14 boats in each of the following classes into the Olympic regatta. Ten rowing crews confirmed Olympic places for their boats at the 2015 FISA World Championships in Lac d'Aiguebelette, France. Meanwhile, the men's eight was further added to the U.S. roster with a top two finish at the 2016 European & Final Qualification Regatta in Lucerne, Switzerland.

To secure their nomination to the U.S. team, the winners of the single, double, and lightweight double sculls (per gender) were determined at the Olympic Trials in Sarasota, Florida (April 17 to 24). Coxless pair rowers had to finish in the top four at the Lucerne leg of the FISA World Cup (May 27 to 29), or win at the second selection phase of the Olympic Trials (June 20 to 22), while those competing in the larger boats were named at a selection camp on June 20, 2016.

Men

Athlete	Event	Heats		Repechage		Semifinals		Final	
Athlete	Event	Time	Rank	Time	Rank	Time	Rank	Time	Rank
Nareg Guregian; Anders Weiss	Pair	6:49.97	4 R	6:36.60	3 SA/B	6:33.95	5 FB	7:10.60	11
Andrew Campbell; Josh Konieczny	Lightweight double sculls	6:26.56	2 SA/B	Bye		6:35.19	2 FA	6:35.07	5
Charlie Cole; Henrik Rummel; Matt Miller; Seth Weil	Four	5:58.31	3 SA/B	Bye		6:19.08	4 FB	5:59.20	7
Anthony Fahden; Edward King; Tyler Nase; Robin Prendes	Lightweight four	6:05.61	2 SA/B	Bye		6:26.82	4 FB	6:36.96	10
Michael di Santo; Sam Dommer; Austin Hack; Alexander Karwoski; Stephen Kasprzyk; Rob Munn; Glenn Ochal; Hans Struzyna; Samuel Ojserkis (cox)	Eight	5:40.16	2 R	5:51.13	1 FA	—N/a		5:43.23	4

Women

Athlete	Event	Heats		Repechage		Quarterfinals		Semifinals		Final	
Athlete	Event	Time	Rank	Time	Rank	Time	Rank	Time	Rank	Time	Rank
Genevra Stone	Single sculls	8:29.67	1 QF	Bye		7:27.04	1 SA/B	7:44.56	2 FA	7:22.92	2nd place, silver medalist(s)
Grace Luczak; Felice Mueller	Pair	7:05.14	1 SA/B	Bye		—N/a		7:20.93	2 FA	7:24.77	4
Meghan O'Leary; Ellen Tomek	Double sculls	7:46.92	4 R	7:00.60	2 SA/B	—N/a		6:52.92	3 FA	8:06.18	6
Kate Bertko; Devery Karz	Lightweight double sculls	7:07.37	3 R	7:58.90	1 SA/B	—N/a		7:22.78	5 FB	7:29.96	10
Tracy Eisser; Megan Kalmoe; Grace Latz; Adrienne Martelli	Quadruple sculls	6:40.78	3 R	6:28.54	4 FA	—N/a				6:57.67	5
Amanda Elmore; Tessa Gobbo; Elle Logan; Meghan Musnicki; Amanda Polk; Emily Regan; Lauren Schmetterling; Kerry Simmonds; Katelin Snyder (cox)	Eight	6:06.34	1 FA	Bye		—N/a				6:01.49	1st place, gold medalist(s)

Qualification Legend: FA=Final A (medal); FB=Final B (non-medal); FC=Final C (non-medal); FD=Final D (non-medal); FE=Final E (non-medal); FF=Final F (non-medal); SA/B=Semifinals A/B; SC/D=Semifinals C/D; SE/F=Semifinals E/F; QF=Quarterfinals; R=Repechage

== Rugby sevens ==
Summary

Team	Event	Group Stage				Quarterfinal	Semifinal / Pl.	Final / BM / Pl.	
Team	Event	Opposition Score	Opposition Score	Opposition Score	Rank	Opposition Score	Opposition Score	Opposition Score	Rank
United States men's	Men's tournament	Argentina; L 14–17	Brazil; W 26–0	Fiji; L 19–24	3	Did not advance	Brazil; W 24–12	Spain; W 24–12	9
United States women's	Women's tournament	Fiji; L 7–12	Colombia; W 48–0	Australia; D 12–12	3 Q	New Zealand; L 0–5	Fiji; W 12–7	France; W 19–5	5

=== Men's tournament ===
The United States men's rugby sevens team qualified for the Olympics by winning the 2015 NACRA Sevens.

Team roster The following is the American roster in the men's rugby sevens tournament of the 2016 Summer Olympics.

Head coach: Mike Friday

No.	Pos.	Player	Date of birth (age)	Events	Points	Union
1	BK	Carlin Isles	21 November 1989 (aged 26)	29	390	Unattached
2	FW	Ben Pinkelman	13 June 1994 (aged 22)	7	40	(United States) Denver Barbarians
3	FW	Danny Barrett	23 March 1990 (aged 26)	23	167	Unattached
4	FW	Garrett Bender	2 December 1991 (aged 24)	24	55	Unattached
5	FW	Zack Test	13 October 1989 (aged 26)	62	721	Unattached
6	FW	Andrew Durutalo	25 October 1987 (aged 28)	30	132	(Japan) Sunwolves
7	BK	Folau Niua	27 January 1985 (aged 31)	40	390	Unattached
8	BK	Maka Unufe	28 September 1991 (aged 24)	23	200	Unattached
9	BK	Chris Wyles	12 September 1983 (aged 32)	13	270	(England) Saracens
10	BK	Madison Hughes (c)	26 October 1992 (aged 23)	23	725	Unattached
11	BK	Perry Baker	29 June 1986 (aged 30)	19	380	Unattached
12	FW	Nate Ebner	14 December 1988 (aged 27)	3	10	(United States) New England Patriots

Group play

Pos	Team	Pld	W	D	L	PF	PA	PD	Pts	Qualification
1	Fiji	3	3	0	0	85	45	+40	9	Quarter-finals
2	Argentina	3	2	0	1	62	35	+27	7	Quarter-finals
3	United States	3	1	0	2	59	41	+18	5	
4	Brazil	3	0	0	3	12	97	−85	3	

Source: World Rugby
Rules for classification: 1) Points; 2) Head-to-head result; 3) Point difference; 4) Points scored.

9 August 2016
13:00

United States	14–17	Argentina
Try: Penalty try 11' c Barrett 12' c Con: Hughes (2/2)	Report (Rio 2016); Report (World Rugby)	Try: Müller 4' c Luna 8' m Moroni 14' m Con: Revol (1/3)

Deodoro Stadium, Rio de Janeiro
Referee: Craig Joubert (South Africa)

9 August 2016
18:00

United States	26–0	Brazil
Try: Niua 3' c Ebner 7' c Isles 13' m Unufe 14' c Con: Hughes (3/4)	Report

Deodoro Stadium, Rio de Janeiro
Referee: Matthew O'Brien (Australia)

10 August 2016
13:30

Fiji	24–19	United States
Try: Kolinisau 6' c Ravouvou 7' m Mata 9' c Kunatani 12' m Con: Kolinisau (2/3); Ravouvou (0/1)	Report	Try: Barrett 4' c Baker 8' c Ebner 13' m Con: Hughes (2/3)

Deodoro Stadium, Rio de Janeiro
Referee: Richard Kelly (New Zealand)

Classification semifinal (9–12)

10 August 2016
16:00

United States	24–12	Brazil
Try: Isles (3) 4' m, 7' m, 10' c Barrett 6' c Con: Hughes (2/4)	Report (Rio 2016); Report (World Rugby)	Try: D. Sancery 3' m Bourda-Couhet 11' c Con: Duque (1/2)

Deodoro Stadium, Rio de Janeiro
Referee: Ben Crouse (South Africa)

Ninth place match

11 August 2016
13:00

United States	24–12	Spain
Try: Barrett 4' c Isles (2) 7' m, 14' m Unufe 12' c Con: Hughes (1/2); Wyles (1/2)	Report (Rio 2016); Report (World Rugby)	Try: Fontes 2' m López 10' c Con: Genua (0/1); Hernández (1/1)

Deodoro Stadium, Rio de Janeiro
Referee: Rasta Rasivhenge (South Africa)

=== Women's tournament ===
The United States women's rugby sevens team qualified for the Olympics by winning the 2015 NACRA Women's Sevens.

Team roster The following is the United States roster in the women's rugby sevens tournament of the 2016 Summer Olympics.

Head coach: Richie Walker

Backs		Forwards
4	Alev Kelter	1	Jillion Potter
5	Bui Baravilala	2	Kelly Griffin (c)
6	Lauren Doyle	3	Kathryn Johnson
7	Victoria Folayan	8	Carmen Farmer
10	Richelle Stephens	9	Joanne Fa'avesi
11	Ryan Carlyle
12	Jessica Javelet

Group play

Pos	Team	Pld	W	D	L	PF	PA	PD	Pts	Qualification
1	Australia	3	2	1	0	101	12	+89	8	Quarter-finals
2	Fiji	3	2	0	1	48	43	+5	7	Quarter-finals
3	United States	3	1	1	1	67	24	+43	6	Quarter-finals
4	Colombia	3	0	0	3	0	137	−137	3	

Source: World Rugby
Rules for classification: 1) Points; 2) Head-to-head result; 3) Point difference; 4) Points scored.

6 August 2016
13:00

United States	7–12	Fiji
Try: Kelter 10' c Con: Baravilala (1/1)	Report (Rio 2016); Report (World Rugby)	Try: Tisolo 4' c Ravisa 8' m Con: Tisolo (1/2)

Deodoro Stadium, Rio de Janeiro
Referee: Rasta Rasivhenge (South Africa)

6 August 2016
18:00

United States	48–0	Colombia
Try: Kelter (2) 1' c, 6' c Doyle 6' m Johnson (2) 7' m, 13' m Javelet 8' c Carlyle 11' c Fa'avesi 14' m Con: Kelter (2/3); Baravilala (2/3); Stephens (0/2)	Report (Rio 2016); Report (World Rugby)

Deodoro Stadium, Rio de Janeiro
Referee: Beatrice Benvenuti (Italy)

7 August 2016
13:30

Australia	12–12	United States
Try: Tonegato (2) 4' m, 14' c Con: Dalton (1/2)	Report (Rio 2016); Report (World Rugby)	Try: Javelet (2) 9' c, 11' m Con: Baravilala (1/2)

Deodoro Stadium, Rio de Janeiro
Referee: Alhambra Nievas (Spain)

Quarterfinal

7 August 2016
18:30

New Zealand	5–0	United States
Try: Woodman 7' m Con: Nathan-Wong (0/1)	Report (Rio 2016); Report (World Rugby)

Deodoro Stadium, Rio de Janeiro
Referee: Rasta Rasivhenge (South Africa)

Classification semifinal (5–8)

8 August 2016
14:00

Fiji	7–12	United States
Try: Tavo 4' c Con: Tinai (1/1)	Report (Rio 2016); Report (World Rugby)	Try: Kelter 10' c Stephens 12' m Con: Kelter (1/1); Baravilala (0/1)

Deodoro Stadium, Rio de Janeiro
Referee: Jess Beard (New Zealand)

Fifth place match

8 August 2016
18:00

France	5–19	United States
Try: Grassineau 6' m Con: Le Pesq (0/1)	Report (Rio 2016); Report (World Rugby)	Try: Kelter 8' c Javelet 9' m Fa'avesi 11' c Con: Kelter (1/2); Stephens (1/1)

Deodoro Stadium, Rio de Janeiro
Referee: Sara Cox (Great Britain)

== Sailing ==
U.S. sailors qualified one boat in each of the following classes through the 2014 ISAF Sailing World Championships, the individual fleet Worlds, and other qualifying regattas. The U.S. Olympic team was determined based on the sailors' finishing positions, that is, their lowest series score from their respective class in selected major international regattas.

On February 15, 2016, U.S. Sailing Olympic team announced their selection for the 49er, 49erFX, and Nacra 17 to represent the country at the Rio regatta, based on the results at the ISAF World Cup meet and World Championships, both held in Florida. Meanwhile, the remaining single-handed sailors (Pascual, Buckingham, Paine, Lepert, and Railey), along with the 470 crews, claimed their Olympic spots at the European Championships and Princess Sofia Trophy Regatta.

Men

Athlete	Event	Race													Net points	Final rank
Athlete	Event	1	2	3	4	5	6	7	8	9	10	11	12	M*	Net points	Final rank
Pedro Pascual	RS:X	25	26	28	28	~~DNF~~	28	22	26	28	23	20	32	EL	286	28
Charlie Buckingham	Laser	20	7	10	22	8	~~26~~	15	10	10	6	—N/a		EL	108	11
Caleb Paine	Finn	7	10	~~21~~	3	14	2	17	7	10	4	—N/a		2	76	3rd place, bronze medalist(s)
David Hughes; Stuart McNay	470	10	7	8	13	4	7	6	1	11	~~14~~	—N/a		4	71	4
Thomas Barrows III; Joseph Morris	49er	18	19	14	14	~~DSQ~~	11	16	16	11	6	13	17	EL	155	19

Women

Athlete	Event	Race													Net points	Final rank
Athlete	Event	1	2	3	4	5	6	7	8	9	10	11	12	M*	Net points	Final rank
Marion Lepert	RS:X	10	3	10	13	RDG	23	6	23	15	~~UFD~~	19	22	EL	156.9	16
Paige Railey	Laser Radial	15	2	9	21	2	7	~~25~~	24	25	4	—N/a		DPI	131	10
Annie Haeger; Briana Provancha	470	7	3	~~10~~	2	5	5	2	8	8	9	—N/a		20	69	7
Paris Henken; Helena Scutt	49erFX	13	~~16~~	14	5	1	4	11	8	8	12	12	6	18	112	10

Mixed

Athlete	Event	Race													Net points	Final rank
Athlete	Event	1	2	3	4	5	6	7	8	9	10	11	12	M*	Net points	Final rank
Bora Gulari; Louisa Chafee	Nacra 17	13	9	~~RET~~	12	21	4	9	2	8	8	9	3	8	106	8

M = Medal race; EL = Eliminated – did not advance into the medal race

== Shooting ==
U.S. shooters qualified for the Games by virtue of their finishes at the 2014 and 2015 ISSF World Championships, 2015 ISSF World Cup series, and designated selection competitions through the Olympic Point System, an opportunity to earn at least one medal in a given tournament and accumulate points within the threshold score (25 for rifle & pistol and 30 for shotgun). The remaining shooters were determined by the Olympic Team Selection trials to secure their spots in each event, as long as they obtained a minimum qualifying score (MQS) by March 31, 2016.

On September 17, 2015, Team USA announced the first six shooters to compete at the Games, including three-time Olympic medalist Matthew Emmons (2004) in rifle shooting, five-time Olympian Glenn Eller (2008) in men's double trap, and defending Olympic champion Vincent Hancock (2008 and 2012) in men's skeet. The remaining shooters were named to the U.S. team at three separate meets of the Olympic Team Trials: small-bore (April 1 to 8), shotgun (May 16 to 25), and air gun (June 3 to 5).

Men

Athlete	Event	Qualification		Semifinal		Final / BM	
Athlete	Event	Points	Rank	Points	Rank	Points	Rank
Lucas Kozeniesky	10 m air rifle	622.3	21	—N/a		Did not advance	
Daniel Lowe	10 m air rifle	620.0	34	—N/a		Did not advance	
David Higgins	50 m rifle prone	617.7	40	—N/a		Did not advance	
Michael McPhail	50 m rifle prone	622.0	19	—N/a		Did not advance	
Matthew Emmons	50 m rifle 3 positions	1169	19	—N/a		Did not advance	
Daniel Lowe	50 m rifle 3 positions	1168	28	—N/a		Did not advance	
Will Brown	10 m air pistol	577	12	—N/a		Did not advance	
Jay Shi	10 m air pistol	577	18	—N/a		Did not advance	
Emil Milev	25 m rapid fire pistol	578	12	—N/a		Did not advance	
Keith Sanderson	25 m rapid fire pistol	580	10	—N/a		Did not advance	
Will Brown	50 m pistol	555	10	—N/a		Did not advance	
Jay Shi	50 m pistol	553	14	—N/a		Did not advance	
Walton Eller	Double trap	131	14	Did not advance			
Joshua Richmond	Double trap	135 (+11)	7	Did not advance			
Vincent Hancock	Skeet	119	15	Did not advance			
Frank Thompson	Skeet	117	21	Did not advance			

Women

Athlete	Event	Qualification		Semifinal		Final / BM	
Athlete	Event	Points	Rank	Points	Rank	Points	Rank
Sarah Scherer	10 m air rifle	416.8	5 Q	—N/a		78.6	8
Virginia Thrasher	10 m air rifle	416.3	6 Q	—N/a		208.0 OR	1st place, gold medalist(s)
Sarah Scherer	50 m rifle 3 positions	570	33	—N/a		Did not advance	
Virginia Thrasher	50 m rifle 3 positions	581	11	—N/a		Did not advance	
Lydia Paterson	10 m air pistol	378	29	—N/a		Did not advance	
Enkelejda Shehu	10 m air pistol	372	40	—N/a		Did not advance	
Enkelejda Shehu	25 m pistol	567	33	Did not advance			
Corey Cogdell	Trap	68	7 Q	13 (+0)	3 q	13 (+1)	3rd place, bronze medalist(s)
Morgan Craft	Skeet	69 (+2)	6 Q	14 (+3)	5	Did not advance	
Kim Rhode	Skeet	72	2 Q	14 (+4)	4 q	15 (+7)	3rd place, bronze medalist(s)

Qualification Legend: Q = Qualify for the next round; q = Qualify for the bronze medal (shotgun)

== Swimming ==
U.S. swimmers achieved qualifying standards in the following events (up to a maximum of 2 swimmers in each event at the Olympic Qualifying Time (OQT), and potentially 1 at the Olympic Selection Time (OST)). To assure their selection to the U.S. team, swimmers had to attain a top two finish in each individual pool event under the Olympic qualifying time at the 2016 Olympic Trials (June 26 to July 3) in Omaha, Nebraska.

A total of 47 swimmers (25 men and 22 women) were named to the U.S. Olympic team at the end of the trials, with the most decorated Olympian Michael Phelps emerging as the first ever male American to compete at his fifth Games, long-distance ace Jordan Wilimovsky becoming the first to double in pool and open water, and Anthony Ervin making history as the oldest male to swim in an individual event since 1904. Notable swimmers also included 11-time medalist Ryan Lochte, world record holder Katie Ledecky, and reigning Olympic champions Missy Franklin, Dana Vollmer, and Allison Schmitt.

On August 11, 2016, Phelps set another historic record as the first ever swimmer to earn four consecutive gold medals in the men's 200 m individual medley. Ledecky's final medal total (four golds, one silver) is the most decorated single-Olympics performance by a U.S. female athlete in terms of gold medals, topping Missy Franklin (2012; four golds, 1 bronze), Simone Biles (2016; four golds, 1 bronze), and Amy Van Dyken (1996; four golds).

Men

Athlete	Event	Heat		Semifinal		Final	
Athlete	Event	Time	Rank	Time	Rank	Time	Rank
Nathan Adrian	50 m freestyle	21.61	2 Q	21.47	4 Q	21.49	3rd place, bronze medalist(s)
Anthony Ervin	50 m freestyle	21.63	3 Q	21.46	2 Q	21.40	1st place, gold medalist(s)
Nathan Adrian	100 m freestyle	48.58	16 Q	47.83	1 Q	47.85	3rd place, bronze medalist(s)
Caeleb Dressel	100 m freestyle	47.91	2 Q	47.97	5 Q	48.02	6
Conor Dwyer	200 m freestyle	1:45.95	4 Q	1:45.55	3 Q	1:45.23	3rd place, bronze medalist(s)
Townley Haas	200 m freestyle	1:46.13	5 Q	1:45.92	6 Q	1:45.58	5
Conor Dwyer	400 m freestyle	3:43:42	1 Q	—N/a		3:44.01	4
Connor Jaeger	400 m freestyle	3:45:37	7 Q	—N/a		3:44.16	5
Connor Jaeger	1500 m freestyle	14:45.74	2 Q	—N/a		14:39.48 AM	2nd place, silver medalist(s)
Jordan Wilimovsky	1500 m freestyle	14:48.23	3 Q	—N/a		14:45.03	4
Ryan Murphy	100 m backstroke	53.06	4 Q	52.49	1 Q	51.97 OR	1st place, gold medalist(s)
David Plummer	100 m backstroke	53.19	5 Q	52.50	2 Q	52.40	3rd place, bronze medalist(s)
Ryan Murphy	200 m backstroke	1:56.29	4 Q	1:55.15	4 Q	1:53.62	1st place, gold medalist(s)
Jacob Pebley	200 m backstroke	1:56.44	5 Q	1:54.92	3 Q	1:55.52	5
Kevin Cordes	100 m breaststroke	59.13	4 Q	59.33	5 Q	59.22	4
Cody Miller	100 m breaststroke	59.17	5 Q	59.05	2 Q	58.84 AM	3rd place, bronze medalist(s)
Kevin Cordes	200 m breaststroke	2:09.30	7 Q	2:07.99	5 Q	2:08.34	8
Josh Prenot	200 m breaststroke	2:09.91	10 Q	2:07.78	3 Q	2:07.53	2nd place, silver medalist(s)
Michael Phelps	100 m butterfly	51.60	4 Q	51.58	5 Q	51.14	2nd place, silver medalist(s)
Tom Shields	100 m butterfly	51.58	3 Q	51.61	6 Q	51.73	7
Michael Phelps	200 m butterfly	1:55.73	5 Q	1:54.12	2 Q	1:53.36	1st place, gold medalist(s)
Tom Shields	200 m butterfly	1:56.93	20	Did not advance			
Ryan Lochte	200 m individual medley	1:57.38	1 Q	1:56.28	2 Q	1:57.47	5
Michael Phelps	200 m individual medley	1:58.41	3 Q	1:55.78	1 Q	1:54.66	1st place, gold medalist(s)
Chase Kalisz	400 m individual medley	4:08:12	1 Q	—N/a		4:06.75	2nd place, silver medalist(s)
Jay Litherland	400 m individual medley	4:11:10	4 Q	—N/a		4:11.68	5
Nathan Adrian; Caeleb Dressel; Anthony Ervin^{[e]} Jimmy Feigen^{[e]} Ryan Held; Michael Phelps; Blake Pieroni^{[e]}	4 × 100 m freestyle relay	3:12.38	2 Q	—N/a		3:09.92	1st place, gold medalist(s)
Gunnar Bentz^{[e]} Jack Conger^{[e]} Conor Dwyer; Townley Haas; Ryan Lochte; Michael Phelps; Clark Smith^{[e]}	4 × 200 m freestyle relay	7:06.74	2 Q	—N/a		7:00.66	1st place, gold medalist(s)
Nathan Adrian; Kevin Cordes^{[e]} Caeleb Dressel^{[e]} Cody Miller; Ryan Murphy; Michael Phelps; David Plummer^{[e]} Tom Shields^{[e]}	4 × 100 m medley relay	3:31.83	2 Q	—N/a		3:27.95 OR	1st place, gold medalist(s)
Sean Ryan	10 km open water	—N/a				1:53:15.5	14
Jordan Wilimovsky	10 km open water	—N/a				1:53:03.2	5

Women

Athlete	Event	Heat		Semifinal		Final	
Athlete	Event	Time	Rank	Time	Rank	Time	Rank
Simone Manuel	50 m freestyle	24.71	11 Q	24.44	6 Q	24.09	2nd place, silver medalist(s)
Abbey Weitzeil	50 m freestyle	24.48	5 Q	24.67	12	did not advance	
Simone Manuel	100 m freestyle	53.32	2 Q	53.11	3 Q	52.70 OR	1st place, gold medalist(s)
Abbey Weitzeil	100 m freestyle	53.54	7 Q	53.53	8 Q	53.30	7
Missy Franklin	200 m freestyle	1:57.12	12 Q	1:57.56	13	did not advance	
Katie Ledecky	200 m freestyle	1:55.01	1 Q	1:54.81	2 Q	1:53.73	1st place, gold medalist(s)
Katie Ledecky	400 m freestyle	3:58.71 OR	1 Q	—N/a		3:56.46 WR	1st place, gold medalist(s)
Leah Smith	400 m freestyle	4:03.39	3 Q	—N/a		4:01.92	3rd place, bronze medalist(s)
Katie Ledecky	800 m freestyle	8:12.86 OR	1 Q	—N/a		8:04.79 WR	1st place, gold medalist(s)
Leah Smith	800 m freestyle	8:21.43	4 Q	—N/a		8:20.95	6
Kathleen Baker	100 m backstroke	58.84	1 Q	58.84	1 Q	58.75	2nd place, silver medalist(s)
Olivia Smoliga	100 m backstroke	59.60	6 Q	59.35	8 Q	58.95	6
Maya DiRado	200 m backstroke	2:08.60	3 Q	2:07.53	3 Q	2:05.99	1st place, gold medalist(s)
Missy Franklin	200 m backstroke	2:09.36	11 Q	2:09.74	14	did not advance	
Lilly King	100 m breaststroke	1:05.78	1 Q	1:05.70	1 Q	1:04.93 OR	1st place, gold medalist(s)
Katie Meili	100 m breaststroke	1:06.00	3 Q	1:06.52	6 Q	1:05.69	3rd place, bronze medalist(s)
Molly Hannis	200 m breaststroke	2:24.74	12 Q	2:26.80	16	did not advance	
Lilly King	200 m breaststroke	2:25.89	15 Q	2:24.59	12	did not advance	
Dana Vollmer	100 m butterfly	56.56	2 Q	57.06	4 Q	56.63	3rd place, bronze medalist(s)
Kelsi Worrell	100 m butterfly	56.97	4 Q	57.54	9	did not advance	
Cammile Adams	200 m butterfly	2:06.67	2 Q	2:07.22	8 Q	2:05.90	4
Hali Flickinger	200 m butterfly	2:06.67	2 Q	2:07.02	6 Q	2:07.71	7
Maya DiRado	200 m individual medley	2:10.24	4 Q	2:08.91	3 Q	2:08.79	3rd place, bronze medalist(s)
Melanie Margalis	200 m individual medley	2:09.62	3 Q	2:10.10	5 Q	2:09.21	4
Elizabeth Beisel	400 m individual medley	4:34.38	6 Q	—N/a		4:34.98	6
Maya DiRado	400 m individual medley	4:33.50	3 Q	—N/a		4:31.15	2nd place, silver medalist(s)
Katie Ledecky; Simone Manuel; Lia Neal^{[e]} Allison Schmitt^{[e]} Dana Vollmer; Amanda Weir^{[e]} Abbey Weitzeil	4 × 100 m freestyle relay	3:33.59	2 Q	—N/a		3:31.89 AM	2nd place, silver medalist(s)
Maya DiRado; Missy Franklin^{[e]} Katie Ledecky; Melanie Margalis^{[e]} Cierra Runge^{[e]} Allison Schmitt; Leah Smith	4 × 200 m freestyle relay	7:47.77	1 Q	—N/a		7:43.03	1st place, gold medalist(s)
Kathleen Baker; Lilly King; Simone Manuel; Katie Meili^{[e]} Olivia Smoliga^{[e]} Dana Vollmer; Abbey Weitzeil; Kelsi Worrell^{[e]}	4 × 100 m medley relay	3:54.67	1 Q	—N/a		3:53.13	1st place, gold medalist(s)
Haley Anderson	10 km open water	—N/a				1:57:20.2	5

Qualifiers for the latter rounds (Q) of all events were decided on a time only basis, therefore positions shown are overall results versus competitors in all heats.
^{e} Swimmer that participated in the preliminaries but not in the final race.

== Synchronized swimming ==
Two U.S. synchronized swimmers claimed spots on the Olympic team in the women's duet by virtue of their seventh-place finish at the FINA Olympic test event in Rio de Janeiro.

Athlete	Event	Free routine (preliminary)		Technical routine			Free routine (final)		
Athlete	Event	Points	Rank	Points	Total (free + technical)	Rank	Points	Total (technical + free)	Rank
Anita Alvarez; Mariya Koroleva	Duet	86.4333	9	86.4612	172.8945	9 Q	85.7333	173.9945	9

== Table tennis ==
Six U.S. table tennis players were entered into the Olympic competition. Jennifer Wu secured the American spot in the women's singles with a gold medal victory at the 2015 Pan American Games. Feng Yijun, Kanak Jha, and 2014 Youth Olympic bronze medalist Lily Zhang took the remaining Olympic berths on the U.S. team at the North American Qualification Tournament in Toronto, Canada. Jha was the first U.S. Olympian born in the 21st century.

London 2012 Olympian Timothy Wang and U.S. champion Zheng Jiaqi were each awarded the third spot to build the men's and women's teams for the Games as the top North American nation in the ITTF Olympic Rankings.

Men

Athlete	Event	Preliminary	Round 1	Round 2	Round 3	Round of 16	Quarterfinals	Semifinals	Final / BM	
Athlete	Event	Opposition Result	Opposition Result	Opposition Result	Opposition Result	Opposition Result	Opposition Result	Opposition Result	Opposition Result	Rank
Feng Yijun	Singles	Bye	He (ESP); L 2–4	did not advance						
Kanak Jha	Singles	Ni Alamian (IRI); L 1–4	did not advance							
Feng Yijun; Kanak Jha; Timothy Wang	Team	—N/a				Sweden; L 0–3	did not advance			

Women

Athlete	Event	Preliminary	Round 1	Round 2	Round 3	Round of 16	Quarterfinals	Semifinals	Final / BM	
Athlete	Event	Opposition Result	Opposition Result	Opposition Result	Opposition Result	Opposition Result	Opposition Result	Opposition Result	Opposition Result	Rank
Jennifer Wu	Singles	Bye	Ódorová (SVK); W 4–1	Ekholm (SWE); L 2–4	did not advance					
Lily Zhang	Singles	Bye	Arvelo (VEN); W 4–0	Shao (POR); W 4–0	Seo (KOR); L 1–4	did not advance				
Jennifer Wu; Lily Zhang; Zheng Jiaqi	Team	—N/a				Germany; L 0–3	did not advance			

== Taekwondo ==
Four U.S. athletes were entered into the taekwondo competition at the Olympics. Jackie Galloway qualified automatically for the women's heavyweight category (+67 kg) by finishing in the top 6 WTF Olympic rankings. Five-time Olympian and three-time Olympic medalist Steven López, 2011 Pan American Games bronze medalist Stephen Lambdin, and London 2012 bronze medalist Paige McPherson secured the remaining spots on the U.S. team by virtue of their top two finish in the men's welterweight (80 kg), men's heavyweight (+80 kg), and women's welterweight (67 kg) categories respectively at the 2016 Pan American Qualification Tournament in Aguascalientes, Mexico.

Athlete	Event	Round of 16	Quarterfinals	Semifinals	Repechage	Final / BM	
Athlete	Event	Opposition Result	Opposition Result	Opposition Result	Opposition Result	Opposition Result	Rank
Steven López	Men's −80 kg	Gaun (RUS); W 7–4	Muhammad (GBR); L 2–9	Did not advance	Shkara (AUS); W 0–0 SUP	Oueslati (TUN); L 5–14 PTG	5
Stephen Lambdin	Men's +80 kg	Siqueira (BRA); L 7–9	did not advance				
Paige McPherson	Women's −67 kg	Azizova (AZE); L 5–6	did not advance				
Jackie Galloway	Women's +67 kg	Weekes (PUR); W 5–0	Oogink (NED); W 1–1 SUP	Espinoza (MEX); L 0–0 SUP	Bye	Épangue (FRA); W 2–1	3rd place, bronze medalist(s)

== Tennis ==
Ten U.S. tennis players (four men, six women) were entered into the Olympic tournament, with the Williams sisters Venus (world no. 9) heading to her historic fifth Olympics and Serena (world no. 1) looking to defend her singles and doubles titles at her fourth. Alongside the Williams sisters, Madison Keys (world no. 16) and Sloane Stephens (world no. 20) qualified directly for the women's singles, as four of the top 56 eligible players in the WTA World Rankings. Meanwhile, rookies Brian Baker (world no. 596), Steve Johnson (world no. 39), Denis Kudla (world no. 56), and Jack Sock (world no. 27) did so for the men's singles based on their ATP World Rankings as of June 6, 2016. Baker used his protected ranking.

Twin brothers Bob and Mike Bryan led the Americans in the men's doubles, while Bethanie Mattek-Sands and CoCo Vandeweghe joined the Williams sisters in the women's doubles by virtue of their top ten ATP and WTA ranking, respectively. Four of the twelve Olympians comprised two mixed doubles teams. The pairings were decided in late July.

On July 30, 2016, the Bryan brothers announced that both of them withdrew from the Games due to concerns around a family health problem, missing an opportunity to defend their Olympic title. They were replaced in the men's doubles by Baker and Rajeev Ram.

Men

Athlete	Event	Round of 64	Round of 32	Round of 16	Quarterfinals	Semifinals	Final / BM	
Athlete	Event	Opposition Score	Opposition Score	Opposition Score	Opposition Score	Opposition Score	Opposition Score	Rank
Brian Baker	Singles	Sugita (JPN); L 7–5, 5–7, 4–6	did not advance					
Steve Johnson	Singles	King (BAR); W 6–3, 6–2	Elias (POR); W 6–3, 6–4	Donskoy (RUS); W 6–1, 6–1	Murray (GBR); L 0–6, 6–4, 6–7^{(2–7)}	did not advance		
Denis Kudla	Singles	Martin (SVK); L 0–6, 3–6	did not advance					
Jack Sock	Singles	Daniel (JPN); L 4–6, 4–6	did not advance					
Brian Baker; Rajeev Ram	Doubles	—N/a	Monfils / Tsonga (FRA); W 6–1, 6–4	Marach / Peya (AUT); L 4–6, 7–6^{(7–2)}, 3–6	did not advance			
Steve Johnson; Jack Sock	Doubles	—N/a	Peralta / Podlipnik Castillo (CHI); W 6–2, 6–2	Cabal / Farah (COL); W 6–4, 7–6^{(7–1)}	Bautista Agut / Ferrer (ESP); W 6–4, 6–2	Mergea / Tecău (ROU); L 3–6, 5–7	Nestor / Pospisil (CAN); W 6–2, 6–4	3rd place, bronze medalist(s)

Women

Athlete	Event	Round of 64	Round of 32	Round of 16	Quarterfinals	Semifinals	Final / BM	
Athlete	Event	Opposition Score	Opposition Score	Opposition Score	Opposition Score	Opposition Score	Opposition Score	Rank
Madison Keys	Singles	Kovinić (MNE); W 6–3, 6–3	Mladenovic (FRA); W 7–5, 6–7^{(4–7)}, 7–6^{(7–5)}	Suárez Navarro (ESP); W 6–3, 3–6, 6–3	Kasatkina (RUS); W 6–3, 6–1	Kerber (GER); L 3–6, 5–7	Kvitová (CZE); L 5–7, 6–2, 2–6	4
Sloane Stephens	Singles	Bouchard (CAN); L 3–6, 3–6	did not advance					
Serena Williams	Singles	Gavrilova (AUS); W 6–4, 6–2	Cornet (FRA); W 7–6^{(7–5)}, 6–2	Svitolina (UKR); L 4–6, 3–6	did not advance			
Venus Williams	Singles	Flipkens (BEL); L 6–4, 3–6, 6–7^{(5–7)}	did not advance					
Bethanie Mattek-Sands; CoCo Vandeweghe	Doubles	—N/a	Medina Garrigues / Parra Santonja (ESP); W 6–1, 6–1	Bacsinszky / Hingis (SUI); L 4–6, 4–6	did not advance			
Serena Williams; Venus Williams	Doubles	—N/a	Šafářová / Strýcová (CZE); L 3–6, 4–6	did not advance				

Mixed

Athlete	Event	Round of 16	Quarterfinals	Semifinals	Final / BM	
Athlete	Event	Opposition Score	Opposition Score	Opposition Score	Opposition Score	Rank
Bethanie Mattek-Sands; Jack Sock	Doubles	Konta / J Murray (GBR); W 6–4, 6–3	Pereira / Melo (BRA); W 6–4, 6–4	Hradecká / Štěpánek (CZE); W 6–4, 7–6^{(7–3)}	Williams / Ram (USA); W 6–7^{(3–7)}, 6–1, [10–7]	1st place, gold medalist(s)
Venus Williams; Rajeev Ram	Doubles	Bertens / Rojer (NED); W 6–7^{(4–7)}, 7–6^{(7–3)}, [10–8]	Vinci / Fognini (ITA); W 6–3, 7–5	Mirza / Bopanna (IND); W 6–2, 2–6, [10–3]	Mattek-Sands / Sock (USA); L 7–6^{(7–3)}, 1–6, [7–10]	2nd place, silver medalist(s)

== Triathlon ==
The United States qualified a total of six triathletes for the following events at the Olympics. Gwen Jorgensen secured a place in the women's triathlon as a result of her top three finish at the ITU World Qualification Event in Rio de Janeiro, while Sarah True earned her spot by finishing fourth at the same event. Meanwhile, Joe Maloy, Greg Billington, and Ben Kanute were ranked among the top 40 eligible triathletes in the men's event based on the ITU Olympic Qualification List as of May 15, 2016. Katie Zaferes was the last triathlete being chosen to the U.S. Olympic roster on May 24, 2016.

Men

Athlete	Event	Swim (1.5 km)	Trans 1	Bike (40 km)	Trans 2	Run (10 km)	Total Time	Rank
Greg Billington	Men's	18:15	0:49	59:33	0:42	32:45	1:52:04	37
Ben Kanute	Men's	17:29	0:46	55:03	0:40	35:01	1:48:59	29
Joe Maloy	Men's	18:03	0:50	56:25	0:35	32:37	1:48:30	23

Women

Athlete	Event	Swim (1.5 km)	Trans 1	Bike (40 km)	Trans 2	Run (10 km)	Total Time	Rank
Gwen Jorgensen	Women's	19:12	0:56	1:01:21	0:38	34:09	1:56:16	1st place, gold medalist(s)
Sarah True	Women's	19:10	0:54	Lapped				
Katie Zaferes	Women's	19:03	1:01	1:01:26	0:41	38:44	2:00:55	18

== Volleyball ==
=== Beach ===
Four U.S. beach volleyball teams (two pairs per gender) qualified directly for the Olympics by virtue of their nation's top 15 placement in the FIVB Olympic Rankings as of June 13, 2016. Among the beach volleyball players were 2008 Olympic champion Phil Dalhausser, along with his rookie partner Nick Lucena, and newly formed Olympic duo of three-time gold medalist Kerri Walsh Jennings and London 2012 runner-up April Ross.

Athlete	Event	Preliminary round				Round of 16	Quarterfinal	Semifinal	Final / BM	
Athlete	Event	Opposition Score	Opposition Score	Opposition Score	Rank	Opposition Score	Opposition Score	Opposition Score	Opposition Score	Rank
Phil Dalhausser; Nick Lucena	Men's	Naceur – Salah (TUN); W 2 – 0 (21–7, 21–13)	Ontiveros – Virgen (MEX); W 2 – 0 (21–14, 21–17)	Lupo – Nicolai (ITA); W 2 – 1 (21–13, 17–21, 24–22)	1 Q	Huber – Seidl (AUT); W 2 – 0 (21–14, 21–15)	Alison – Bruno Schmidt (BRA); L 1 – 2 (14–21, 21–12, 9–15)	did not advance		
Jake Gibb; Casey Patterson	Men's	Jefferson – Cherif (QAT); W 2 – 0 (21–16, 21–16)	Huber – Seidl (AUT); L 0 – 2 (18–21, 18–21)	Gavira – Herrera (ESP); L 1 – 2 (19–21, 21–16, 7–15)	4	did not advance				
Lauren Fendrick; Brooke Sweat	Women's	Brzostek – Kołosińska (POL); L 1 – 2 (21–14, 13–21, 7–15)	Antunes – França (BRA); L 0 – 2 (16–21, 13–21)	Birlova – Ukolova (RUS); L 1 – 2 (18–21, 26–24, 13–15)	4	did not advance				
April Ross; Kerri Walsh Jennings	Women's	Artacho – Laird (AUS); W 2 – 0 (21–14, 21–13)	Wang – Yue (CHN); W 2 – 0 (21–16, 21–9)	Forrer – Vergé-Dépré (SUI); W 2 – 1 (21–13, 22–24, 15–12)	1 Q	Menegatti – Giombini (ITA); W 2 – 0 (21–10, 21–16)	Bawden – Clancy (AUS); W 2 – 0 (21–14, 21–16)	Ágatha – Bárbara (BRA); L 0 – 2 (20–22, 18–21)	Larissa – Talita (BRA); W 2 – 1 (17–21, 21–17, 15–9)	3rd place, bronze medalist(s)

=== Indoor ===
Summary

Team	Event	Group Stage						Quarterfinal	Semifinal	Final / BM	
Team	Event	Opposition Score	Opposition Score	Opposition Score	Opposition Score	Opposition Score	Rank	Opposition Score	Opposition Score	Opposition Score	Rank
United States men's	Men's tournament	Canada; L 0–3	Italy; L 1–3	Brazil; W 3–1	France; W 3–1	Mexico; W 3–0	3 Q	Poland; W 3–0	Italy; L 2–3	Russia; W 3–2	3rd place, bronze medalist(s)
United States women's	Women's tournament	Puerto Rico; W 3–0	Netherlands; W 3–2	Serbia; W 3–1	Italy; W 3–1	China; W 3–1	1 Q	Japan; W 3–0	Serbia; L 2–3	Netherlands; W 3–1	3rd place, bronze medalist(s)

==== Men's tournament ====
The U.S. men's volleyball team qualified for the Olympics by attaining a top two finish at the 2015 FIVB World Cup in Japan.

Team roster The following is the United States roster in the men's volleyball tournament of the 2016 Summer Olympics.

Head coach: John Speraw

No.	Name	Date of birth	Height	Weight	Spike	Block	2015–16 club
1	Matthew Anderson	18 April 1987	2.02 m (6 ft 8 in)	100 kg (220 lb)	360 cm (140 in)	332 cm (131 in)	(Russia) Zenit Kazan
2	Aaron Russell	4 June 1993	2.05 m (6 ft 9 in)	98 kg (216 lb)	360 cm (140 in)	339 cm (133 in)	(Italy) Sir Safety Conad Perugia
3	Taylor Sander	17 March 1992	1.96 m (6 ft 5 in)	80 kg (180 lb)	358 cm (141 in)	335 cm (132 in)	(Italy) Calzedonia Verona
4	David Lee (c)	8 March 1982	2.03 m (6 ft 8 in)	105 kg (231 lb)	350 cm (140 in)	325 cm (128 in)	(Greece) P.A.O.K. Thessaloniki
7	Kawika Shoji	11 November 1987	1.90 m (6 ft 3 in)	79 kg (174 lb)	331 cm (130 in)	315 cm (124 in)	(Turkey) Arkas İzmir
8	William Priddy	1 October 1977	1.94 m (6 ft 4 in)	89 kg (196 lb)	353 cm (139 in)	330 cm (130 in)	(Italy) Cucine Lube Civitanova
9	Murphy Troy	31 May 1989	2.02 m (6 ft 8 in)	99 kg (218 lb)	360 cm (140 in)	350 cm (140 in)	(Poland) Lotos Trefl Gdańsk
10	Thomas Jaeschke	4 September 1993	1.98 m (6 ft 6 in)	84 kg (185 lb)	348 cm (137 in)	330 cm (130 in)	(Poland) Asseco Resovia Rzeszów
11	Micah Christenson	8 May 1993	1.98 m (6 ft 6 in)	88 kg (194 lb)	349 cm (137 in)	340 cm (130 in)	(Italy) Cucine Lube Civitanova
17	Maxwell Holt	12 March 1987	2.05 m (6 ft 9 in)	90 kg (200 lb)	351 cm (138 in)	333 cm (131 in)	(Russia) Dynamo Moscow
20	David Smith	15 May 1985	2.01 m (6 ft 7 in)	86 kg (190 lb)	360 cm (140 in)	345 cm (136 in)	(France) Tours VB
22	Erik Shoji (L)	24 August 1989	1.84 m (6 ft 0 in)	75 kg (165 lb)	317 cm (125 in)	305 cm (120 in)	(Germany) Berlin Recycling Volleys

Group play

Pos	Team	Pld	W	L	Pts	SW	SL	SR	SPW	SPL	SPR	Qualification
1	Italy	5	4	1	12	13	5	2.600	432	375	1.152	Quarterfinals
2	Canada	5	3	2	9	10	7	1.429	378	378	1.000	Quarterfinals
3	United States	5	3	2	9	10	8	1.250	419	405	1.035	Quarterfinals
4	Brazil (H)	5	3	2	9	11	9	1.222	467	442	1.057	Quarterfinals
5	France	5	2	3	6	8	9	0.889	386	367	1.052	
6	Mexico	5	0	5	0	1	15	0.067	283	398	0.711	

Source: FIVB
Rules for classification: Tiebreakers
(H) Host

7 August 2016; 17:05	United States	0–3	Canada	Ginásio do Maracanãzinho, Rio de Janeiro; Attendance: 6,875; Referees: Andrey Zenovich (RUS), Mohammad Shahmiri (IRI)
7 August 2016; 17:05	(23–25, 17–25, 23–25); Results Statistics			Ginásio do Maracanãzinho, Rio de Janeiro; Attendance: 6,875; Referees: Andrey Zenovich (RUS), Mohammad Shahmiri (IRI)

9 August 2016; 15:00	Italy	3–1	United States	Ginásio do Maracanãzinho, Rio de Janeiro; Attendance: 6,494; Referees: Vladimir Simonović (SRB), Andrey Zenovich (RUS)
9 August 2016; 15:00	(28–26, 20–25, 25–23, 25–23); Results Statistics			Ginásio do Maracanãzinho, Rio de Janeiro; Attendance: 6,494; Referees: Vladimir Simonović (SRB), Andrey Zenovich (RUS)

11 August 2016; 22:35	Brazil	1–3	United States	Ginásio do Maracanãzinho, Rio de Janeiro; Attendance: 8,779; Referees: Liu Jiang (CHN), Vladimir Simonović (SRB)
11 August 2016; 22:35	(20–25, 23–25, 25–20, 20–25); Results Statistics			Ginásio do Maracanãzinho, Rio de Janeiro; Attendance: 8,779; Referees: Liu Jiang (CHN), Vladimir Simonović (SRB)

13 August 2016; 17:25	United States	3–1	France	Ginásio do Maracanãzinho, Rio de Janeiro; Attendance: 7,877; Referees: Arturo Di Giacomo (BEL), Luis Macias (MEX)
13 August 2016; 17:25	(25–22, 25–22, 14–25, 25–22); Results Statistics			Ginásio do Maracanãzinho, Rio de Janeiro; Attendance: 7,877; Referees: Arturo Di Giacomo (BEL), Luis Macias (MEX)

15 August 2016; 11:35	United States	3–0	Mexico	Ginásio do Maracanãzinho, Rio de Janeiro; Attendance: 7,963; Referees: Mohammad Shahmiri (IRI), Piotr Dudek (POL)
15 August 2016; 11:35	(25–23, 25–11, 25–19); Results Statistics			Ginásio do Maracanãzinho, Rio de Janeiro; Attendance: 7,963; Referees: Mohammad Shahmiri (IRI), Piotr Dudek (POL)

Quarterfinal

17 August 2016; 14:00	United States	3–0	Poland	Ginásio do Maracanãzinho, Rio de Janeiro; Attendance: 8,278; Referees: Fabrizio Pasquali (ITA), Andrey Zenovich (RUS)
17 August 2016; 14:00	(25–23, 25–22, 25–20); Results Statistics			Ginásio do Maracanãzinho, Rio de Janeiro; Attendance: 8,278; Referees: Fabrizio Pasquali (ITA), Andrey Zenovich (RUS)

Semifinal

19 August 2016; 13:00	Italy	3–2	United States	Ginásio do Maracanãzinho, Rio de Janeiro; Attendance: 8,153; Referees: Arturo Di Giacomo (BEL), Hernán Casamiquela (ARG)
19 August 2016; 13:00	(30–28, 26–28, 9–25, 25–22, 15–9); Results Statistics			Ginásio do Maracanãzinho, Rio de Janeiro; Attendance: 8,153; Referees: Arturo Di Giacomo (BEL), Hernán Casamiquela (ARG)

Bronze medal match

21 August 2016; 09:30	United States	3–2	Russia	Ginásio do Maracanãzinho, Rio de Janeiro; Attendance: 6,976; Referees: Fabrizio Pasquali (ITA), Liu Jiang (CHN)
21 August 2016; 09:30	(23–25, 21–25, 25–19, 25–19, 15–13); Results Statistics			Ginásio do Maracanãzinho, Rio de Janeiro; Attendance: 6,976; Referees: Fabrizio Pasquali (ITA), Liu Jiang (CHN)

==== Women's tournament ====
The U.S. women's volleyball team qualified for the Olympics by attaining a top finish and securing a lone outright berth at the North American Qualifier in Lincoln, Nebraska.

Team roster The following is the American roster in the women's volleyball tournament of the 2016 Summer Olympics.

Head coach: Karch Kiraly

No.	Name	Date of birth	Height	Weight	Spike	Block	2015–16 club
1	Alisha Glass	5 April 1988	1.81 m (5 ft 11 in)	72 kg (159 lb)	305 cm (120 in)	300 cm (120 in)	(Italy) Imoco Volley
2	Kayla Banwarth (L)	21 January 1989	1.75 m (5 ft 9 in)	75 kg (165 lb)	295 cm (116 in)	283 cm (111 in)	(United States) USA Volleyball
3	Courtney Thompson	4 November 1984	1.70 m (5 ft 7 in)	66 kg (146 lb)	276 cm (109 in)	263 cm (104 in)	(Brazil) Rio de Janeiro VC
5	Rachael Adams	3 June 1990	1.86 m (6 ft 1 in)	81 kg (179 lb)	318 cm (125 in)	307 cm (121 in)	(Italy) Imoco Volley
6	Carli Lloyd	6 August 1989	1.78 m (5 ft 10 in)	75 kg (165 lb)	313 cm (123 in)	295 cm (116 in)	(Italy) VBC Pallavollo Rosa
10	Jordan Larson	16 October 1986	1.87 m (6 ft 2 in)	75 kg (165 lb)	302 cm (119 in)	295 cm (116 in)	(Turkey) Eczacıbaşı VitrA
12	Kelly Murphy	20 October 1989	1.88 m (6 ft 2 in)	79 kg (174 lb)	315 cm (124 in)	307 cm (121 in)	(Japan) Ageo Medics
13	Christa Harmotto (c)	12 October 1986	1.87 m (6 ft 2 in)	79 kg (174 lb)	322 cm (127 in)	300 cm (120 in)	(Turkey) Fenerbahçe
15	Kimberly Hill	30 November 1989	1.93 m (6 ft 4 in)	72 kg (159 lb)	320 cm (130 in)	310 cm (120 in)	(Turkey) Vakıfbank Istanbul
16	Foluke Akinradewo	5 October 1987	1.89 m (6 ft 2 in)	79 kg (174 lb)	331 cm (130 in)	300 cm (120 in)	(Switzerland) Voléro Zürich
23	Kelsey Robinson	25 June 1992	1.84 m (6 ft 0 in)	75 kg (165 lb)	306 cm (120 in)	300 cm (120 in)	(Italy) Imoco Volley
25	Karsta Lowe	2 February 1993	1.93 m (6 ft 4 in)	82 kg (181 lb)	315 cm (124 in)	305 cm (120 in)	(Italy) Futura Volley

Group play

Pos	Team	Pld	W	L	Pts	SW	SL	SR	SPW	SPL	SPR	Qualification
1	United States	5	5	0	14	15	5	3.000	470	400	1.175	Quarter-finals
2	Netherlands	5	4	1	11	14	7	2.000	455	425	1.071	Quarter-finals
3	Serbia	5	3	2	10	12	6	2.000	410	394	1.041	Quarter-finals
4	China	5	2	3	7	9	9	1.000	398	389	1.023	Quarter-finals
5	Italy	5	1	4	3	4	12	0.333	351	374	0.939	
6	Puerto Rico	5	0	5	0	0	15	0.000	277	379	0.731	

Source: FIVB
Rules for classification: Tiebreakers

6 August 2016; 17:05	United States	3–0	Puerto Rico	Ginásio do Maracanãzinho, Rio de Janeiro; Attendance: 6,832; Referees: Taoufik Boudaya (TUN), Kang Joo-hee (KOR)
6 August 2016; 17:05	(25–17, 25–22, 25–17); Result Statistics			Ginásio do Maracanãzinho, Rio de Janeiro; Attendance: 6,832; Referees: Taoufik Boudaya (TUN), Kang Joo-hee (KOR)

8 August 2016; 15:00	United States	3–2	Netherlands	Ginásio do Maracanãzinho, Rio de Janeiro; Attendance: 5,455; Referees: Mohammad Shahmiri (IRI), Juraj Mokrý (SVK)
8 August 2016; 15:00	(18–25, 25–18, 21–25, 25–20, 15–8); Result Statistics			Ginásio do Maracanãzinho, Rio de Janeiro; Attendance: 5,455; Referees: Mohammad Shahmiri (IRI), Juraj Mokrý (SVK)

10 August 2016; 15:00	United States	3–1	Serbia	Ginásio do Maracanãzinho, Rio de Janeiro; Attendance: 7,134; Referees: Hernán Casamiquela (ARG), Rogerio Espicalsky (BRA)
10 August 2016; 15:00	(25–17, 21–25, 25–18, 25–19); Result Statistics			Ginásio do Maracanãzinho, Rio de Janeiro; Attendance: 7,134; Referees: Hernán Casamiquela (ARG), Rogerio Espicalsky (BRA)

12 August 2016; 15:00	United States	3–1	Italy	Ginásio do Maracanãzinho, Rio de Janeiro; Attendance: 7,243; Referees: Rogerio Espicalsky (BRA), Denny Cespedes (DOM)
12 August 2016; 15:00	(25–22, 25–22, 23–25, 25–20); Result Statistics			Ginásio do Maracanãzinho, Rio de Janeiro; Attendance: 7,243; Referees: Rogerio Espicalsky (BRA), Denny Cespedes (DOM)

14 August 2016; 17:05	United States	3–1	China	Ginásio do Maracanãzinho, Rio de Janeiro; Attendance: 6,897; Referees: Heike Kraft (GER), Juraj Mokrý (SVK)
14 August 2016; 17:05	(22–25, 25–17, 25–19, 25–19); Result Statistics			Ginásio do Maracanãzinho, Rio de Janeiro; Attendance: 6,897; Referees: Heike Kraft (GER), Juraj Mokrý (SVK)

Quarterfinal

16 August 2016; 14:00	Japan	0–3	United States	Ginásio do Maracanãzinho, Rio de Janeiro; Attendance: 7,226; Referees: Paulo Turci (BRA), Heike Kraft (GER)
16 August 2016; 14:00	(16–25, 23–25, 22–25); Result Statistics			Ginásio do Maracanãzinho, Rio de Janeiro; Attendance: 7,226; Referees: Paulo Turci (BRA), Heike Kraft (GER)

Semifinal

18 August 2016; 13:00	Serbia	3–2	United States	Ginásio do Maracanãzinho, Rio de Janeiro; Attendance: 5,837; Referees: Andrey Zenovich (RUS), Nasr Shaaban (EGY)
18 August 2016; 13:00	(20–25, 25–17, 25–21, 16–25, 15–13); Result Statistics			Ginásio do Maracanãzinho, Rio de Janeiro; Attendance: 5,837; Referees: Andrey Zenovich (RUS), Nasr Shaaban (EGY)

Bronze medal match

20 August 2016; 13:00	Netherlands	1–3	United States	Ginásio do Maracanãzinho, Rio de Janeiro; Attendance: 7,897; Referees: Paulo Turci (BRA), Piotr Dudek (POL)
20 August 2016; 13:00	(23–25, 27–25, 22–25, 19–25); Result Statistics			Ginásio do Maracanãzinho, Rio de Janeiro; Attendance: 7,897; Referees: Paulo Turci (BRA), Piotr Dudek (POL)

== Water polo ==
Summary

Key:
- FT – After full time.
- P – Match decided by penalty-shootout.

Team	Event	Group Stage						Quarterfinal	Semifinal	Final / BM	
Team	Event	Opposition Score	Opposition Score	Opposition Score	Opposition Score	Opposition Score	Rank	Opposition Score	Opposition Score	Opposition Score	Rank
United States men's	Men's tournament	Croatia; L 5–7	Spain; L 9–10	France; W 6–3	Montenegro; L 5–8	Italy; W 10–7	5	did not advance			10
United States women's	Women's tournament	Spain; W 11–4	China; W 12–4	Hungary; W 11–6	—N/a		1	Brazil; W 13–3	Hungary; W 14–10	Italy; W 12–5	1st place, gold medalist(s)

=== Men's tournament ===
The U.S. men's water polo team qualified for the Olympics, after securing a spot in the gold medal match and having attained an automatic berth by virtue of Olympic host nation Brazil's win in the other semifinal at the 2015 Pan American Games in Toronto, Canada.

Team roster The following is the American roster in the men's water polo tournament of the 2016 Summer Olympics.

Head coach: (Serbia) Dejan Udovičić

№	Name	Pos.	Height	Weight	Date of birth	2016 club
1	Merrill Moses	GK	1.91 m (6 ft 3 in)	93 kg (205 lb)	13 August 1977	(United States) New York Athletic Club
2	Thomas Dunstan	D	1.92 m (6 ft 4 in)	91 kg (201 lb)	29 September 1997	(United States) Regency WP Club
3	Ben Hallock	CF	1.96 m (6 ft 5 in)	95 kg (209 lb)	22 November 1997	(United States) Los Angeles WP Club
4	Alex Obert	CB	1.98 m (6 ft 6 in)	102 kg (225 lb)	18 December 1991	(United States) New York Athletic Club
5	Alex Roelse	CB	2.00 m (6 ft 7 in)	104 kg (229 lb)	10 January 1995	(United States) UCLA Bruins
6	Luca Cupido	D	1.93 m (6 ft 4 in)	95 kg (209 lb)	9 November 1995	(United States) Newport WP Foundation
7	Josh Samuels	D	1.93 m (6 ft 4 in)	93 kg (205 lb)	8 July 1991	(United States) New York Athletic Club
8	Tony Azevedo (c)	D	1.85 m (6 ft 1 in)	89 kg (196 lb)	21 November 1981	(United States) New York Athletic Club
9	Alex Bowen	D	1.96 m (6 ft 5 in)	100 kg (220 lb)	14 September 1993	(United States) New York Athletic Club
10	Bret Bonanni	D	1.93 m (6 ft 4 in)	93 kg (205 lb)	20 January 1994	(United States) New York Athletic Club
11	Jesse Smith	CB	1.93 m (6 ft 4 in)	109 kg (240 lb)	27 April 1983	(United States) New York Athletic Club
12	John Mann	CF	1.98 m (6 ft 6 in)	113 kg (249 lb)	27 June 1985	(United States) New York Athletic Club
13	McQuin Baron	GK	2.03 m (6 ft 8 in)	104 kg (229 lb)	27 October 1995	(United States) Regency WP Club

Group play

Pos	Team	Pld	W	D	L	GF	GA	GD	Pts	Qualification
1	Spain	5	3	1	1	46	35	+11	7	Quarter-finals
2	Croatia	5	3	0	2	37	37	0	6	Quarter-finals
3	Italy	5	3	0	2	40	41	−1	6	Quarter-finals
4	Montenegro	5	2	1	2	36	32	+4	5	Quarter-finals
5	United States	5	2	0	3	35	35	0	4	
6	France	5	1	0	4	28	42	−14	2	

Source: Rio2016
Rules for classification: 1) Points; 2) Head-to-head points; 3) Head-to-head goal difference; 4) Head-to-head goals scored; 5) Goal difference.

6 August 2016; 10:20	Report	United States	5–7	Croatia	Maria Lenk Aquatic Center, Rio de Janeiro; Referees: Boris Margeta (SLO), Daniel Flahive (AUS)
6 August 2016; 10:20	Report	Score by quarters: 2–2, 1–1, 1–2, 1–2			Maria Lenk Aquatic Center, Rio de Janeiro; Referees: Boris Margeta (SLO), Daniel Flahive (AUS)
6 August 2016; 10:20	Report	Azevedo 2	Goals	Joković, Šetka 2	Maria Lenk Aquatic Center, Rio de Janeiro; Referees: Boris Margeta (SLO), Daniel Flahive (AUS)

8 August 2016; 11:40	Report	United States	9–10	Spain	Maria Lenk Aquatic Center, Rio de Janeiro; Referees: Adrian Alexandrescu (ROU), Péter Molnár (HUN)
8 August 2016; 11:40	Report	Score by quarters: 2–4, 3–1, 2–3, 2–2			Maria Lenk Aquatic Center, Rio de Janeiro; Referees: Adrian Alexandrescu (ROU), Péter Molnár (HUN)
8 August 2016; 11:40	Report	Bonanni 4	Goals	Echenique 3	Maria Lenk Aquatic Center, Rio de Janeiro; Referees: Adrian Alexandrescu (ROU), Péter Molnár (HUN)

10 August 2016; 11:40	Report	France	3–6	United States	Maria Lenk Aquatic Center, Rio de Janeiro; Referees: German Moller (ARG), Adrian Alexandrescu (ROU)
10 August 2016; 11:40	Report	Score by quarters: 1–1, 0–4, 0–0, 2–1			Maria Lenk Aquatic Center, Rio de Janeiro; Referees: German Moller (ARG), Adrian Alexandrescu (ROU)
10 August 2016; 11:40	Report	three players 1	Goals	Samuels 3	Maria Lenk Aquatic Center, Rio de Janeiro; Referees: German Moller (ARG), Adrian Alexandrescu (ROU)

12 August 2016; 11:40	Report	United States	5–8	Montenegro	Maria Lenk Aquatic Center, Rio de Janeiro; Referees: Radosław Koryzna (POL), Georgios Stavridis (GRE)
12 August 2016; 11:40	Report	Score by quarters: 1–2, 0–0, 2–2, 2–4			Maria Lenk Aquatic Center, Rio de Janeiro; Referees: Radosław Koryzna (POL), Georgios Stavridis (GRE)
12 August 2016; 11:40	Report	Samuels 2	Goals	Da. Brguljan 2	Maria Lenk Aquatic Center, Rio de Janeiro; Referees: Radosław Koryzna (POL), Georgios Stavridis (GRE)

14 August 2016; 15:30	Report	United States	10–7	Italy	Olympic Aquatics Stadium, Rio de Janeiro; Referees: Boris Margeta (SLO), Vojin Putniković (SRB)
14 August 2016; 15:30	Report	Score by quarters: 2–4, 3–2, 3–1, 2–0			Olympic Aquatics Stadium, Rio de Janeiro; Referees: Boris Margeta (SLO), Vojin Putniković (SRB)
14 August 2016; 15:30	Report	four players 2	Goals	Di Fulvio, Figlioli 2	Olympic Aquatics Stadium, Rio de Janeiro; Referees: Boris Margeta (SLO), Vojin Putniković (SRB)

=== Women's tournament ===
The U.S. women's water polo team qualified for the Olympics by virtue of a top four finish at the Olympic Qualification Tournament in Gouda.

Team roster The following is the American roster in the women's water polo tournament of the 2016 Summer Olympics.

Head coach: Adam Krikorian

№	Name	Pos.	Height	Weight	Date of birth	2016 club
1	Samantha Hill	GK	1.80 m (5 ft 11 in)	89 kg (196 lb)	8 June 1992	(United States) Santa Barbara WP Foundation
2	Madeline Musselmann	D	1.80 m (5 ft 11 in)	61 kg (134 lb)	16 June 1998	(United States) Corona del Mar Aquatics
3	Melissa Seidemann	CB	1.83 m (6 ft 0 in)	104 kg (229 lb)	26 June 1990	(United States) New York Athletic Club
4	Rachel Fattal	D	1.72 m (5 ft 8 in)	66 kg (146 lb)	10 December 1993	(United States) SoCal
5	Caroline Clark	CB	1.88 m (6 ft 2 in)	73 kg (161 lb)	28 June 1990	(United States) New York Athletic Club
6	Maggie Steffens (c)	CB	1.75 m (5 ft 9 in)	70 kg (154 lb)	4 June 1993	(United States) New York Athletic Club
7	Courtney Mathewson	D	1.70 m (5 ft 7 in)	71 kg (157 lb)	14 September 1986	(United States) New York Athletic Club
8	Kiley Neushul	D	1.72 m (5 ft 8 in)	66 kg (146 lb)	5 March 1993	(United States) Santa Barbara WP Foundation
9	Aria Fischer	CF	1.83 m (6 ft 0 in)	65 kg (143 lb)	2 March 1999	(United States) SET Water Polo
10	Kaleigh Gilchrist	D	1.75 m (5 ft 9 in)	77 kg (170 lb)	16 May 1992	(United States) New York Athletic Club
11	Makenzie Fischer	CB	1.85 m (6 ft 1 in)	75 kg (165 lb)	29 March 1997	(United States) SET Water Polo
12	Kami Craig	CF	1.80 m (5 ft 11 in)	88 kg (194 lb)	21 July 1987	(United States) New York Athletic Club
13	Ashleigh Johnson	GK	1.85 m (6 ft 1 in)	86 kg (190 lb)	12 September 1994	(United States) New York Athletic Club

Group play

Pos	Team	Pld	W	D	L	GF	GA	GD	Pts	Qualification
1	United States	3	3	0	0	34	14	+20	6	Quarter-finals
2	Spain	3	2	0	1	27	29	−2	4	Quarter-finals
3	Hungary	3	1	0	2	29	33	−4	2	Quarter-finals
4	China	3	0	0	3	23	37	−14	0	Quarter-finals

Source: Rio2016
Rules for classification: 1) Points; 2) Head-to-head points; 3) Head-to-head goal difference; 4) Head-to-head goals scored; 5) Goal difference.

9 August 2016; 11:40	Report	Spain	4–11	United States	Maria Lenk Aquatic Center, Rio de Janeiro; Referees: Daniel Flahive (AUS), Filippo Gomez (ITA)
9 August 2016; 11:40	Report	Score by quarters: 1–4, 1–3, 2–2, 0–2			Maria Lenk Aquatic Center, Rio de Janeiro; Referees: Daniel Flahive (AUS), Filippo Gomez (ITA)
9 August 2016; 11:40	Report	García 2	Goals	three players 2	Maria Lenk Aquatic Center, Rio de Janeiro; Referees: Daniel Flahive (AUS), Filippo Gomez (ITA)

11 August 2016; 11:40	Report	China	4–12	United States	Maria Lenk Aquatic Center, Rio de Janeiro; Referees: Radosław Koryzna (POL), Filippo Gomez (ITA)
11 August 2016; 11:40	Report	Score by quarters: 1–4, 0–3, 2–3, 1–2			Maria Lenk Aquatic Center, Rio de Janeiro; Referees: Radosław Koryzna (POL), Filippo Gomez (ITA)
11 August 2016; 11:40	Report	four players 1	Goals	Musselman, Steffens 4	Maria Lenk Aquatic Center, Rio de Janeiro; Referees: Radosław Koryzna (POL), Filippo Gomez (ITA)

13 August 2016; 13:00	Report	Hungary	6–11	United States	Maria Lenk Aquatic Center, Rio de Janeiro; Referees: Marie-Claude Deslières (CAN), Diana Dutilh-Dumas (NED)
13 August 2016; 13:00	Report	Score by quarters: 2–2, 1–5, 1–1, 2–3			Maria Lenk Aquatic Center, Rio de Janeiro; Referees: Marie-Claude Deslières (CAN), Diana Dutilh-Dumas (NED)
13 August 2016; 13:00	Report	Szűcs 2	Goals	Steffens 4	Maria Lenk Aquatic Center, Rio de Janeiro; Referees: Marie-Claude Deslières (CAN), Diana Dutilh-Dumas (NED)

Quarterfinal

15 August 2016; 14:10	Report	Brazil	3–13	United States	Olympic Aquatics Stadium, Rio de Janeiro; Referees: Diana Dutilh-Dumas (NED), Tadao Tahara (JPN)
15 August 2016; 14:10	Report	Score by quarters: 0–5, 0–3, 0–5, 3–0			Olympic Aquatics Stadium, Rio de Janeiro; Referees: Diana Dutilh-Dumas (NED), Tadao Tahara (JPN)
15 August 2016; 14:10	Report	three players 1	Goals	four players 2	Olympic Aquatics Stadium, Rio de Janeiro; Referees: Diana Dutilh-Dumas (NED), Tadao Tahara (JPN)

Semifinal

17 August 2016; 16:30	Report	Hungary	10–14	United States	Olympic Aquatics Stadium, Rio de Janeiro; Referees: Daniel Flahive (AUS), Georgios Stavridis (GRE)
17 August 2016; 16:30	Report	Score by quarters: 2–3, 3–5, 3–4, 2–2			Olympic Aquatics Stadium, Rio de Janeiro; Referees: Daniel Flahive (AUS), Georgios Stavridis (GRE)
17 August 2016; 16:30	Report	Keszthelyi 4	Goals	Steffens 4	Olympic Aquatics Stadium, Rio de Janeiro; Referees: Daniel Flahive (AUS), Georgios Stavridis (GRE)

Gold medal match

19 August 2016; 15:30	Report	United States	12–5	Italy	Olympic Aquatics Stadium, Rio de Janeiro; Referees: Adrian Alexandrescu (ROU), Francesc Buch (ESP)
19 August 2016; 15:30	Report	Score by quarters: 4–1, 1–2, 4–1, 3–1			Olympic Aquatics Stadium, Rio de Janeiro; Referees: Adrian Alexandrescu (ROU), Francesc Buch (ESP)
19 August 2016; 15:30	Report	Neushul 3	Goals	Radicchi 2	Olympic Aquatics Stadium, Rio de Janeiro; Referees: Adrian Alexandrescu (ROU), Francesc Buch (ESP)

== Weightlifting ==
U.S. weightlifters qualified three women's quota places for the Rio Olympics based on their combined team standing by points at the 2014 and 2015 IWF World Championships. One qualified automatically by virtue of top performances at these events. The others were selected following an Olympic trial on May 8, 2016. A single men's Olympic spot was added to the U.S. roster by virtue of a top seven national finish at the 2016 Pan American Championships. The team had to allocate these places to individual athletes by June 20, 2016.

Athlete	Event	Snatch		Clean & Jerk		Total	Rank
Athlete	Event	Result	Rank	Result	Rank	Total	Rank
Kendrick Farris	Men's −94 kg	160	11	197	11	357	11
Morghan King	Women's −48 kg	83	5	100	6	183	6
Jenny Arthur	Women's −75 kg	107	=6	135	=5	242	6
Sarah Robles	Women's +75 kg	126	3	160	4	286	3rd place, bronze medalist(s)

== Wrestling ==
The United States qualified a total of 14 wrestlers for the Olympics, the fewest since 1952. Five of them finished among the top six to book Olympic spots each in men's freestyle 74 & 97 kg, men's Greco-Roman 75 & 130 kg, and women's freestyle 75 kg at the 2015 World Championships, while four more licenses were awarded to U.S. wrestlers, who progressed to the top two finals at the 2016 Pan American Qualification Tournament. Four further wrestlers claimed the Olympic slots to round out the U.S. roster in separate World Qualification Tournaments; three of them each in men's freestyle 85 kg and women's freestyle 48 & 53 kg at the initial meet in Ulaanbaatar, and one more in men's Greco-Roman 59 kg at the final meet in Istanbul.

To assure their selection to the U.S. Olympic team, wrestlers had to claim a top spot of each division at the 2016 Olympic Trials (April 8 to 10) in Iowa City, Iowa. Among them were London 2012 gold medalist Jordan Burroughs and World champions Helen Maroulis, Kyle Snyder, and Adeline Gray. On May 11, 2016, Frank Molinaro, who finished third in men's freestyle 65 kg at the final meet in Istanbul, was awarded a final Olympic spot on the U.S. wrestling team after an original qualifier withdrew.

Key:
- VT – Victory by fall.
- PP – Decision by points – the loser with technical points.
- PO – Decision by points – the loser without technical points.
- SP – Technical superiority – the loser with technical points and a margin of victory of at least 9 (Greco-Roman) or 10 (freestyle) points.
- ST – Great superiority – the loser without technical points and a margin of victory of at least 8 (Greco-Roman) or 10 (freestyle) points.
- VA – Decision by withdrawal

Men

Athlete	Event	Qualification	Round of 16	Quarterfinal	Semifinal	Repechage 1	Repechage 2	Final / BM	
Athlete	Event	Opposition Result	Opposition Result	Opposition Result	Opposition Result	Opposition Result	Opposition Result	Opposition Result	Rank
Daniel Dennis	Freestyle −57 kg	Bye	Dubov (BUL); L 0–4 ^{ST}	did not advance					19
Frank Molinaro	Freestyle −65 kg	Bye	Gadzhiev (POL); W 3–1 ^{PP}	Asgarov (AZE); L 0–4 ^{ST}	Did not advance	Bye	Kvyatkovskyy (UKR); W 3–1 ^{PP}	Chamizo (ITA); L 1–3 ^{PP}	5
Jordan Burroughs	Freestyle −74 kg	Bye	Midana (GBS); W 3–1 ^{PP}	Geduev (RUS); L 1–3 ^{PP}	Did not advance	Bye	Abdurakhmonov (UZB); L 1–4 ^{SP}	Did not advance	9
J'den Cox	Freestyle −86 kg	Bye	Mahamedau (BLR); W 3–1 ^{PP}	Karimi (IRI); W 3–1 ^{PP}	Yaşar (TUR); L 1–3 ^{PP}	Bye		Salas (CUB); W 5–0 ^{VA}	3rd place, bronze medalist(s)
Kyle Snyder	Freestyle −97 kg	Bye	Cortina (CUB); W 3–1 ^{PP}	Saritov (ROU); W 3–0 ^{PO}	Odikadze (GEO); W 3–1 ^{PP}	Bye		Gazyumov (AZE); W 3–1 ^{PP}	1st place, gold medalist(s)
Tervel Dlagnev	Freestyle −125 kg	Bye	Magomedov (AZE); W 3–1 ^{PP}	Baran (POL); W 3–1 ^{PP}	Ghasemi (IRI); L 0–4 ^{ST}	Bye		Petriashvili (GEO); L 0–4 ^{ST}	5
Jesse Thielke	Greco-Roman −59 kg	Bye	Messaoudi (MAR); W 4–0 ^{ST}	Bayramov (AZE); L 0–4 ^{ST}	did not advance				9
Andy Bisek	Greco-Roman −75 kg	Bye	Hernández (CUB); W 3–0 ^{PO}	Starčević (CRO); L 0–3 ^{PO}	did not advance				12
Ben Provisor	Greco-Roman −85 kg	Bye	Assakalov (UZB); L 1–3 ^{PP}	did not advance					12
Robby Smith	Greco-Roman −130 kg	Bye	Shariati (AZE); L 1–3 ^{PP}	did not advance					12

Women

Athlete	Event	Qualification	Round of 16	Quarterfinal	Semifinal	Repechage 1	Repechage 2	Final / BM	
Athlete	Event	Opposition Result	Opposition Result	Opposition Result	Opposition Result	Opposition Result	Opposition Result	Opposition Result	Rank
Haley Augello	−48 kg	Bye	Blaszka (NED); W 3–0 ^{PO}	Tosaka (JPN); L 1–3 ^{PP}	Did not advance	Bye	Eshimova (KAZ); L 1–3 ^{PP}	Did not advance	9
Helen Maroulis	−53 kg	Khalvadzhy (UKR); W 3–1 ^{PP}	Zhong (CHN); W 4–0 ^{ST}	Jong (PRK); W 3–1 ^{PP}	Mattsson (SWE); W 5–0 ^{VT}	Bye		Yoshida (JPN); W 3–1 ^{PP}	1st place, gold medalist(s)
Elena Pirozhkova	−63 kg	Bye	Yusein (BUL); W 3–1 ^{PP}	Soronzonbold (MGL); W 3–1 ^{PP}	Mamashuk (BLR); L 1–3 ^{PP}	Bye		Larionova (KAZ); L 0–5 ^{VT}	5
Adeline Gray	−75 kg	Bye	Olaya (COL); W 5–0 ^{VT}	Marzaliuk (BLR); L 1–3 ^{PP}	did not advance				7

== See also ==
- United States at the 2015 Pan American Games
- United States at the 2016 Winter Youth Olympics
- United States at the 2016 Summer Paralympics
