= Shooting at the 2016 Summer Olympics – Qualification =

This article details the qualifying phase for shooting at the 2016 Summer Olympics. 366 quota places for the Games are entitled to the shooters coming from their respective NOCs, based on the results at designated ISSF supervised Championships subjected to the ISSF rules from August 1, 2014, to March 31, 2016, while the remaining twenty-four are available to the eligible NOCs under the Tripartite Commission Invitation to get a total quota of 390. Host nation Brazil has been guaranteed nine quota places with one in each of the following events: 50 m rifle prone, 25 m rapid fire pistol, 10 m air pistol (both men and women), 10 m air rifle (women), trap (both men and women), and skeet (both men and women).

Quota places can be obtained at the 2014 and 2015 ISSF World Championships, the 2015 ISSF World Cup series, and the designated Continental Championships or Games during the qualifying period.

== Summary ==
Nation	Men									Women						Total	
Nation	FR 3x40	FR 60PR	AR 60	FP	RFP	AP 60	TR 125	DT 150	SK 125	STR 3x20	AR 40	SP	AP 40	TR 75	SK 75	Quotas	Athletes
Algeria			1													1	1
Andorra											1					1	1
Angola							1									1	1
Argentina							1		1	1	1				1	5	5
Armenia			1													1	1
Australia	1	2	1	1	1	1	2	1	2		1	1	1	2	1	18	18
Austria	1	1	1						1		1					5	5
Azerbaijan					1											1	1
Bahrain			1													1	1
Bangladesh			1													1	1
Barbados									1							1	1
Belarus		1	2										1			4	4
Belgium							1									1	1
Bhutan											1					1	1
Bolivia						1					1					2	2
Bosnia and Herzegovina											1					1	1
Brazil		1			1	2	1		1		1			1	1	9	9
Bulgaria			1			1						1				3	3
Canada												1	1	1		3	2
Chile															1	1	1
China	2	1	2	2	2	2		2		2	2	2	2	1	2	24	22
Colombia							1									1	1
Croatia			1				2			1	2		1			7	7
Cuba	1	1		1	1				1	1	1					7	7
Cyprus									1						1	2	2
Czech Republic		1					1			2					1	5	5
Denmark		1							1		1					3	3
Dominican Republic							1									1	1
Ecuador												1				1	1
Egypt	1	1		1	1	1	2		2	1	2		1			13	12
El Salvador													1			1	1
Estonia					1											1	1
Fiji							1									1	1
Finland							1							1		2	2
France	2	1	1		1				2	1		2	1			11	11
Georgia						1						1				2	2
Germany	2	2	2		2			1	1	2	2	1		1	1	17	15
Great Britain							1	2		1					2	6	6
Greece									1				1			2	2
Guatemala								2								2	2
Hungary		1	2			1					1	2	1			8	8
India	2	1	1	2		1	2		1		2		1			13	12
Iran			1							1	2		1			5	5
Israel			1													1	1
Italy	1	1		1	1		2	2	2		1			1	2	14	14
Japan	1		1	1	2							1		1	1	8	8
Kazakhstan	1					2				1				1		5	5
Kosovo											1					1	1
Kuwait							2	2	2							6	6
Latvia									1							1	1
Lebanon														1		1	1
Lithuania									1							1	1
Macedonia											1					1	1
Malaysia						1										1	1
Malta							1						1			2	2
Mexico											1		1			2	2
Mongolia											1	2				3	3
Morocco								1								1	1
Myanmar						1										1	1
Namibia														1		1	1
New Zealand		1												1	1	3	3
Nicaragua						1										1	1
North Korea				2								1		1		4	4
Norway	2		1							1						4	4
Oman	1												1			2	2
Pakistan						1					1					2	2
Panama						1										1	1
Paraguay								1								1	1
Peru				1			1									2	2
Poland						1				2			1		1	5	5
Portugal						1										1	1
Puerto Rico										1						1	1
Qatar									2							2	2
Romania			1													1	1
Russia	1	2	2	1	1	2	1	2	1		1	2	2	2	1	21	19
San Marino							1							2		3	3
Saudi Arabia						1										1	1
Serbia	1		2	1		1					2		2			9	9
Singapore										1		1				2	2
Slovakia				1		1	2								1	5	5
Slovenia							1				1					2	2
South Korea	1	2	1	2	2	2				2	2	2	2			18	17
Spain			1	1	1		1						1	1		6	6
Sri Lanka		1														1	1
Sweden								1	2							3	3
Switzerland	1									1	2	1				5	4
Chinese Taipei							1						2	1		4	4
Thailand	1	1										1	1		1	5	5
Tunisia												1				1	1
Turkey						2	2									4	4
Ukraine	1		1		1	2			1	1			1			8	8
United Arab Emirates								1	2							3	3
United States	1	2	2	1	2	1		2	2	1	1	1	1	1	2	20	20
Uzbekistan			1													1	1
Venezuela			1													1	1
Vietnam				1		1										2	
Zimbabwe								1								1	1
Total: 97 NOCs	25	26	33	22	22	30	31	22	32	24	38	24	29	21	21	400	390

== Qualification timeline ==
Event	Date	Venue
2014 ISSF World Shooting Championships	September 8–19, 2014	(Spain) Granada
2014 American Continental Championships	October 11–20, 2014	(Mexico) Guadalajara
2015 ISSF World Cup # 1	March 2–9, 2015	(Mexico) Acapulco
2015 ISSF World Cup # 2	March 21–28, 2015	(United Arab Emirates) Al Ain
2015 ISSF World Cup # 3	April 10–15, 2015	(South Korea) Changwon
2015 ISSF World Cup # 4	April 26 – May 3, 2015	(Cyprus) Larnaca
2015 ISSF World Cup # 5	May 13–18, 2015	(United States) Fort Benning
2015 ISSF World Cup # 6	May 28 – June 1, 2015	(Germany) Munich
2015 European Games	June 16–21, 2015	(Azerbaijan) Baku
2015 Pan American Games	July 12–19, 2015	(Canada) Toronto
2015 European Shooting Championships	July 21–31, 2015	(Slovenia) Maribor
2015 ISSF World Cup # 7	August 8–15, 2015	(Azerbaijan) Gabala
2015 ISSF World Shotgun Championships	September 11–17, 2015	(Italy) Lonato
2015 Oceania Continental Championships	November 27 – December 2, 2015	(Australia) Sydney
2015 African Continental Championships	November 30 – December 6, 2015	(Egypt) Cairo
2016 Asian Olympic Qualifying Tournament*	January 25 – February 3, 2016	(India) New Delhi
2016 European Championships 10m events	February 24–27, 2016	(Hungary) Győr
Re-allocation of unused quota places	July 18, 2016	

* The Asian Championships were scheduled to take place on November 1 to 12, 2015 in Kuwait City, Kuwait, and served as a final Olympic qualifier for the aforementioned continent, but the IOC had stripped the nation of its rights and revoked the Olympic qualifying status of the competition, following the Kuwait NOC's suspension for government interference and the denial of visa for the ISSF technical delegate from Israel.

== 50 m rifle three positions men ==
Event	Quota places	Qualified athlete	Announced competitor
2014 World Championships	China	Zhu Qinan	Zhu Qinan
2014 World Championships	Ukraine	Serhiy Kulish	Serhiy Kulish
2014 World Championships	South Korea	Han Jin-seop	Kim Hyeon-jun
2014 World Championships	Norway	Are Hansen	Odd Arne Brekne
2014 World Championships	Italy	Niccolò Campriani	Niccolò Campriani
2014 American Continental Championships	Cuba	Alexander Molerio	Alexander Molerio
2015 ISSF World Cup # 3	China	Hui Zicheng	Hui Zicheng
2015 ISSF World Cup # 3	Norway	Ole Kristian Bryhn	Ole Kristian Bryhn
2015 ISSF World Cup # 5	Japan	Toshikazu Yamashita	Toshikazu Yamashita
2015 ISSF World Cup # 5	Kazakhstan	Yuriy Yurkov	Yuriy Yurkov
2015 ISSF World Cup # 6	Germany	Andre Link	Andre Link
2015 ISSF World Cup # 6	France	Alexis Raynaud	Alexis Raynaud
2015 European Games	France	Valérian Sauveplane	Valérian Sauveplane
2015 Pan American Games	United States	George Norton	Matthew Emmons
2015 European Championships	Serbia	Milenko Sebić	Stevan Pletikosić
2015 European Championships	Germany	Michael Janker	Daniel Brodmeier
2015 European Championships	Austria	Gernot Rumpler	Gernot Rumpler
2015 ISSF World Cup # 7	Russia	Fedor Vlasov	Fedor Vlasov
2015 ISSF World Cup # 7	India	Chain Singh	Chain Singh
2015 Oceania Championships	Australia	Dane Sampson	William Godward
2015 African Championships	Egypt	Hamada Talat	Hamada Talat
2016 Asian Olympic Qualifying Tournament	India	Sanjeev Rajput^{[a]}	—
2016 Asian Olympic Qualifying Tournament	Qatar	Vitaliy Dovgun^{[f]}	—
2016 Asian Olympic Qualifying Tournament	Thailand	Napis Tortungpanich	Napis Tortungpanich
Exchange of quota places	Switzerland	—N/a	Jan Lochbichler^{[i]}
Tripartite Commission Invitation	Oman	—N/a	Hamed Said Al-Khatri
Athletes qualified in other events	Australia	—N/a	Dane Sampson
Athletes qualified in other events	Austria	—N/a	Alexander Schmirl
Athletes qualified in other events	Belarus	—N/a	Illia Charheika
Athletes qualified in other events	Belarus	—N/a	Yury Shcherbatsevich
Athletes qualified in other events	Brazil	—N/a	Cassio Rippel
Athletes qualified in other events	Bulgaria	—N/a	Anton Rizov
Athletes qualified in other events	Croatia	—N/a	Petar Gorša
Athletes qualified in other events	Cuba	—N/a	Reinier Estpinan
Athletes qualified in other events	Czech Republic	—N/a	Filip Nepejchal
Athletes qualified in other events	Hungary	—N/a	István Péni
Athletes qualified in other events	Hungary	—N/a	Péter Sidi
Athletes qualified in other events	India	—N/a	Gagan Narang^{[a]}
Athletes qualified in other events	Iran	—N/a	Pouria Norouzian
Athletes qualified in other events	Italy	—N/a	Marco de Nicolo
Athletes qualified in other events	South Korea	—N/a	Kim Jong-hyun
Athletes qualified in other events	Russia	—N/a	Sergey Kamenskiy
Athletes qualified in other events	Serbia	—N/a	Milenko Sebić
Athletes qualified in other events	Ukraine	—N/a	Oleh Tsarkov
Athletes qualified in other events	United States	—N/a	Daniel Lowe
Athletes qualified in other events	Venezuela	—N/a	Julio Iemma
Total			44

== 50 m rifle prone men ==
Event	Quota places	Qualified athlete	Announced competitor
2014 World Championships	Australia	Warren Potent	Warren Potent
2014 World Championships	Germany	Daniel Brodmeier	Daniel Brodmeier
2014 World Championships	Belarus	Yury Shcherbatsevich	Yury Shcherbatsevich
2014 World Championships	Russia	Sergey Kamenskiy	Sergey Kamenskiy
2014 World Championships	Italy	Marco de Nicolo	Marco de Nicolo
2014 American Continental Championships	Cuba	Reinier Estpinan	Reinier Estpinan
2015 ISSF World Cup # 3	United States	Matthew Emmons	David Higgins
2015 ISSF World Cup # 3	South Korea	Kim Hak-man	Kwon Jun-cheol
2015 ISSF World Cup # 5	United States	Michael McPhail	Michael McPhail
2015 ISSF World Cup # 5	India	Gagan Narang	Gagan Narang
2015 ISSF World Cup # 6	France	Cyril Graff	Cyril Graff
2015 ISSF World Cup # 6	Austria	Stefan Raser	Thomas Mathis
2015 European Games	Germany	Henri Junghänel	Henri Junghänel
2015 Pan American Games	Brazil	Cassio Rippel	Cassio Rippel
2015 European Championships	Russia	Sergei Kovalenko	Kirill Grigoryan
2015 European Championships	Hungary	Norbert Szabián	Norbert Szabián
2015 ISSF World Cup # 7	Denmark	Torben Grimmel	Torben Grimmel
2015 ISSF World Cup # 7	Czech Republic	Tomáš Jeřábek	Filip Nepejchal
2015 Oceania Championships	New Zealand	Ryan Taylor	Ryan Taylor
2015 Oceania Championships	Australia	Frederyk Woodhouse	Dane Sampson
2015 African Championships	Egypt	Ahmed Darwish	Ahmed Darwish
2016 Asian Olympic Qualifying Tournament	South Korea	Kim Jong-hyun	Kim Jong-hyun
2016 Asian Olympic Qualifying Tournament	Thailand	Attapon Uea-aree	Attapon Uea-aree
Exchange of quota places	China	—N/a	Zhao Shengbo^{[b]}
Tripartite Commission Invitation	Sri Lanka	—N/a	Mangala Samarakoon
Re-allocation of unused quota	Bahrain	—N/a	Mahmood Haji
Athletes qualified in other events	Austria	—N/a	Alexander Schmirl
Athletes qualified in other events	Belarus	—N/a	Vitali Bubnovich
Athletes qualified in other events	Bulgaria	—N/a	Anton Rizov
Athletes qualified in other events	China	—N/a	Cao Yifei
Athletes qualified in other events	Croatia	—N/a	Petar Gorša
Athletes qualified in other events	France	—N/a	Jérémy Monnier
Athletes qualified in other events	Hungary	—N/a	Péter Sidi
Athletes qualified in other events	India	—N/a	Chain Singh
Athletes qualified in other events	Israel	—N/a	Sergey Richter
Athletes qualified in other events	Italy	—N/a	Niccolò Campriani
Athletes qualified in other events	Japan	—N/a	Toshikazu Yamashita
Athletes qualified in other events	Kazakhstan	—N/a	Yuriy Yurkov
Athletes qualified in other events	Norway	—N/a	Odd Arne Brekne
Athletes qualified in other events	Norway	—N/a	Ole Kristian Bryhn
Athletes qualified in other events	Serbia	—N/a	Stevan Pletikosic
Athletes qualified in other events	Serbia	—N/a	Milenko Sebić
Athletes qualified in other events	Switzerland	—N/a	Jan Lochbihler
Athletes qualified in other events	Thailand	—N/a	Napis Tortungpanich
Athletes qualified in other events	Ukraine	—N/a	Serhiy Kulish
Athletes qualified in other events	Ukraine	—N/a	Oleh Tsarkov
Athletes qualified in other events	Venezuela	—N/a	Julio Iemma
Total			47

== 10 m air rifle men ==
Event	Quota places	Qualified athlete	Announced competitor
2014 World Championships	China	Yang Haoran	Yang Haoran
2014 World Championships	Russia	Nazar Louginets	Sergey Kamenskiy
2014 World Championships	Belarus	Vitali Bubnovich	Vitali Bubnovich
2014 World Championships	Russia	Sergei Kruglov	Vladimir Maslennikov
2014 World Championships	China	Cao Yifei	Cao Yifei
2014 World Championships	France	Jérémy Monnier	Jérémy Monnier
2014 American Continental Championships	United States	Dempster Christenson	Daniel Lowe
2015 ISSF World Cup # 3	Hungary	Péter Sidi	Péter Sidi
2015 ISSF World Cup # 3	South Korea	Kim Sang-do	Jung Ji-geun
2015 ISSF World Cup # 3	Germany	Nicolas Schallenberger	Michael Janker
2015 ISSF World Cup # 5	Serbia	Milutin Stefanović	Milutin Stefanović
2015 ISSF World Cup # 5	Bulgaria	Anton Rizov	Anton Rizov
2015 ISSF World Cup # 5	Austria	Alexander Schmirl	Alexander Schmirl
2015 ISSF World Cup # 6	India	Abhinav Bindra	Abhinav Bindra
2015 ISSF World Cup # 6	Serbia	Stevan Pletikosić	Milenko Sebić
2015 ISSF World Cup # 6	Ukraine	Oleh Tsarkov	Oleh Tsarkov
2015 European Games	Israel	Sergey Richter	Sergey Richter
2015 Pan American Games	United States	Connor Davis	Lucas Kozeniesky
2015 Pan American Games	Venezuela	Julio Iemma	Julio Iemma
2015 ISSF World Cup # 7	Croatia	Petar Gorša	Petar Gorša
2015 ISSF World Cup # 7	Belarus	Illia Charheika	Illia Charheika
2015 ISSF World Cup # 7	Hungary	István Péni	István Péni
2015 Oceania Championships	Australia	Jack Rossiter	Jack Rossiter
2015 African Championships	Algeria	Chafik Bouaoud	Chafik Bouaoud
2016 Asian Olympic Qualifying Tournament	Japan	Naoya Okada	Naoya Okada
2016 Asian Olympic Qualifying Tournament	Iran	Pouria Norouzian	Pouria Norouzian
2016 European Championships 10m events	Norway	Ole Magnus Bakken	Are Hansen
2016 European Championships 10m events	Germany	Julian Justus	Julian Justus
2016 European Championships 10m events	Spain	Jorge Díaz	Jorge Díaz
Tripartite Commission Invitation	Bangladesh	—N/a	Abdullah Hel Baki
Re-allocation of unused quota	Armenia	—N/a	Hrachik Babayan
Re-allocation of unused quota	Romania	—N/a	Alin Moldoveanu
Re-allocation of unused quota	Uzbekistan	—N/a	Vadim Skorovarov
Athletes qualified in other events	Australia	—N/a	Dane Sampson
Athletes qualified in other events	Austria	—N/a	Gernot Rumpler
Athletes qualified in other events	Cuba	—N/a	Reinier Estpinan
Athletes qualified in other events	Cuba	—N/a	Alexander Molerio
Athletes qualified in other events	Czech Republic	—N/a	Filip Nepejchal
Athletes qualified in other events	Egypt	—N/a	Hamada Talat
Athletes qualified in other events	France	—N/a	Valérian Sauveplane
Athletes qualified in other events	India	—N/a	Gagan Narang
Athletes qualified in other events	Italy	—N/a	Niccolò Campriani
Athletes qualified in other events	Italy	—N/a	Marco de Nicolo
Athletes qualified in other events	Japan	—N/a	Toshikazu Yamashita
Athletes qualified in other events	Kazakhstan	—N/a	Yuriy Yurkov
Athletes qualified in other events	South Korea	—N/a	Kim Hyeon-jun
Athletes qualified in other events	Norway	—N/a	Ole Kristian Bryhn
Athletes qualified in other events	Sri Lanka	—N/a	Mangala Samarakoon
Athletes qualified in other events	Thailand	—N/a	Napis Tortungpanich
Athletes qualified in other events	Ukraine	—N/a	Serhiy Kulish
Total			50

== 50 m pistol men ==
Event	Quota places	Qualified athlete	Announced competitor
2014 World Championships	South Korea	Jin Jong-oh	Jin Jong-oh
2014 World Championships	India	Jitu Rai	Jitu Rai
2014 World Championships	China	Pang Wei	Pang Wei
2014 World Championships	Vietnam	Hoàng Xuân Vinh	Hoàng Xuân Vinh
2014 American Continental Championships	Cuba	Jorge Grau	Jorge Grau
2015 ISSF World Cup # 3	China	Zhang Bowen	Wang Zhiwei
2015 ISSF World Cup # 3	South Korea	Park Dae-hun	Han Seung-woo
2015 ISSF World Cup # 5	Serbia	Damir Mikec	Damir Mikec
2015 ISSF World Cup # 5	United States	James Henderson	Jay Shi
2015 ISSF World Cup # 6	Italy	Giuseppe Giordano	Giuseppe Giordano
2015 ISSF World Cup # 6	Japan	Tomoyuki Matsuda	Tomoyuki Matsuda
2015 European Games	Slovakia	Pavol Kopp	Pavol Kopp
2015 Pan American Games	Peru	Marko Carrillo	Marko Carrillo
2015 European Championships	Italy	Francesco Bruno^{[k]}	—
2015 European Championships	Russia	Sergey Chervyakovskiy	Denis Kulakov
2015 ISSF World Cup # 7	Spain	Pablo Carrera	Pablo Carrera
2015 ISSF World Cup # 7	India	Prakash Nanjappa	Prakash Nanjappa
2015 Oceania Championships	Australia	Daniel Repacholi	Daniel Repacholi
2015 African Championships	Egypt	Samy Abdel Razek	Samy Abdel Razek
2016 Asian Olympic Qualifying Tournament	North Korea	Kim Song-guk	Kim Song-guk
2016 Asian Olympic Qualifying Tournament	North Korea	Kim Jong-su	Kim Jong-su
Exchange of quota places	Brazil	—N/a	Júlio Almeida^{[c]}
Tripartite Commission Invitation	Bolivia	—N/a	Rudolf Knijnenburg
Athletes qualified in other events	Brazil	—N/a	Felipe Almeida Wu
Athletes qualified in other events	Bulgaria	—N/a	Samuil Donkov
Athletes qualified in other events	Georgia	—N/a	Tsotne Machavariani
Athletes qualified in other events	Hungary	—N/a	Miklós Tátrai
Athletes qualified in other events	Kazakhstan	—N/a	Vladimir Issachenko
Athletes qualified in other events	Kazakhstan	—N/a	Rashid Yunusmetov
Athletes qualified in other events	Malaysia	—N/a	Johnathan Wong
Athletes qualified in other events	Myanmar	—N/a	Ye Tun Naung
Athletes qualified in other events	Panama	—N/a	David Muñoz
Athletes qualified in other events	Portugal	—N/a	João Costa
Athletes qualified in other events	Russia	—N/a	Vladimir Gontcharov
Athletes qualified in other events	Saudi Arabia	—N/a	Atallah Al-Anazi
Athletes qualified in other events	Serbia	—N/a	Dimitrije Grgić
Athletes qualified in other events	Slovakia	—N/a	Juraj Tužinský
Athletes qualified in other events	Turkey	—N/a	Yusuf Dikeç
Athletes qualified in other events	Turkey	—N/a	İsmail Keleş
Athletes qualified in other events	Ukraine	—N/a	Oleh Omelchuk
Athletes qualified in other events	United States	—N/a	Will Brown
Athletes qualified in other events	Vietnam	—N/a	Trần Quốc Cường
Total			41

== 25 m rapid fire pistol men ==
Event	Quota places	Qualified athlete	Announced competitor
Host nation	Brazil	—N/a	Emerson Duarte
2014 World Championships	South Korea	Kim Jun-hong	Kim Jun-hong
2014 World Championships	Germany	Oliver Geis	Oliver Geis
2015 ISSF World Cup # 3	France	Jean Quiquampoix	Jean Quiquampoix
2015 ISSF World Cup # 3	South Korea	Song Jong-ho	Kang Min-su
2015 ISSF World Cup # 5	Cuba	Leuris Pupo	Leuris Pupo
2015 ISSF World Cup # 5	Germany	Christian Reitz	Christian Reitz
2015 ISSF World Cup # 6	Russia	Alexei Klimov	Alexei Klimov
2015 ISSF World Cup # 6	United States	Keith Sanderson	Keith Sanderson
2015 European Games	Spain	Jorge Llames	Jorge Llames
2015 Pan American Games	United States	Brad Balsley	Emil Milev
2015 European Championships	Ukraine	Roman Bondaruk	Roman Bondaruk
2015 ISSF World Cup # 7	China	Hu Haozhe	Li Yuehong
2015 ISSF World Cup # 7	China	Lao Jiajie	Zhang Fusheng
2015 Oceania Championships	Australia	David Chapman	David Chapman
2015 African Championships	Egypt	Ahmed Shaban	Ahmed Shaban
2016 Asian Olympic Qualifying Tournament	Japan	Teruyoshi Akiyama	Teruyoshi Akiyama
2016 Asian Olympic Qualifying Tournament	Japan	Eita Mori	Eita Mori
Exchange of quota places	Italy	—N/a	Riccardo Mazzetti^{[k]}
Tripartite Commission Invitation	Pakistan	—N/a	Ghulam Mustafa Bashir
Re-allocation of unused quota	Azerbaijan	—N/a	Ruslan Lunev
Re-allocation of unused quota	Estonia	—N/a	Peeter Olesk
Athletes qualified in other events	India	—N/a	Gurpreet Singh
Athletes qualified in other events	Peru	—N/a	Marko Carrillo
Athletes qualified in other events	Poland	—N/a	Piotr Daniluk
Athletes qualified in other events	Ukraine	—N/a	Pavlo Korostylov
Total			26

== 10 m air pistol men ==
Event	Quota places	Qualified athlete	Announced competitor
2014 World Championships	Turkey	Yusuf Dikeç	Yusuf Dikeç
2014 World Championships	Russia	Vladimir Gontcharov	Vladimir Gontcharov
2014 World Championships	China	Pu Qifeng	Pu Qifeng
2014 World Championships	Vietnam	Trần Quốc Cường	Trần Quốc Cường
2014 World Championships	Slovakia	Juraj Tužinský	Juraj Tužinský
2014 World Championships	Bulgaria	Samuil Donkov	Samuil Donkov
2014 American Continental Championships	United States	Will Brown	Will Brown
2015 ISSF World Cup # 3	Myanmar	Ye Tun Naung	Ye Tun Naung
2015 ISSF World Cup # 3	Serbia	Dimitrije Grgić	Dimitrije Grgić
2015 ISSF World Cup # 3	Russia	Leonid Ekimov	Vladimir Isakov
2015 ISSF World Cup # 5	Portugal	João Costa	João Costa
2015 ISSF World Cup # 5	Ukraine	Oleh Omelchuk	Oleh Omelchuk
2015 ISSF World Cup # 5	Turkey	İsmail Keleş	İsmail Keleş
2015 ISSF World Cup # 6	China	Sun Yang	Pang Wei
2015 ISSF World Cup # 6	India	Gurpreet Singh	Gurpreet Singh
2015 ISSF World Cup # 6	South Korea	Lee Dae-myung	Lee Dae-myung
2015 European Games	Ukraine	Pavlo Korostylov	Pavlo Korostylov
2015 Pan American Games	Brazil	Felipe Almeida Wu	Felipe Almeida Wu
2015 ISSF World Cup # 7	Kazakhstan	Rashid Yunusmetov	Rashid Yunusmetov
2015 ISSF World Cup # 7	Kazakhstan	Vladimir Issachenko	Vladimir Issachenko
2015 ISSF World Cup # 7	South Korea	Kim Cheong-yong^{[l]}	—
2015 Oceania Championships	Australia	Chris Summerell	Blake Blackburn
2015 African Championships	Egypt	Ahmed Mohamed	Ahmed Mohamed
2016 Asian Olympic Qualifying Tournament	Malaysia	Johnathan Wong	Johnathan Wong
2016 Asian Olympic Qualifying Tournament	Saudi Arabia	Atallah Al-Anazi	Atallah Al-Anazi
2016 European Championships 10m events	Poland	Wojciech Knapik	Piotr Daniluk
2016 European Championships 10m events	Georgia	Tsotne Machavariani	Tsotne Machavariani
2016 European Championships 10m events	Hungary	Miklós Tátrai	Miklós Tátrai
Tripartite Commission Invitation	Nicaragua	—N/a	Rafael Lacayo
Tripartite Commission Invitation	Panama	—N/a	David Muñoz
Athletes qualified in other events	Australia	—N/a	Daniel Repacholi
Athletes qualified in other events	Azerbaijan	—N/a	Ruslan Lunev
Athletes qualified in other events	Brazil	—N/a	Júlio Almeida
Athletes qualified in other events	Cuba	—N/a	Jorge Grau
Athletes qualified in other events	Egypt	—N/a	Samy Abdel Razek
Athletes qualified in other events	Spain	—N/a	Pablo Carrera
Athletes qualified in other events	India	—N/a	Jitu Rai
Athletes qualified in other events	Italy	—N/a	Giuseppe Giordano
Athletes qualified in other events	Japan	—N/a	Tomoyuki Matsuda
Athletes qualified in other events	North Korea	—N/a	Kim Song-guk
Athletes qualified in other events	North Korea	—N/a	Kim Jong-su
Athletes qualified in other events	Peru	—N/a	Marko Carrillo
Athletes qualified in other events	Serbia	—N/a	Damir Mikec
Athletes qualified in other events	Slovakia	—N/a	Pavol Kopp
Athletes qualified in other events	South Korea	—N/a	Jin Jong-oh^{[l]}
Athletes qualified in other events	United States	—N/a	Jay Shi
Athletes qualified in other events	Vietnam	—N/a	Hoàng Xuân Vinh
Total			46

== Trap men ==
Event	Quota places	Qualified athlete	Announced competitor
Host nation	Brazil	—N/a	Roberto Schmits
2014 World Championships	Slovakia	Erik Varga	Erik Varga
2014 World Championships	Great Britain	Edward Ling	Edward Ling
2014 World Championships	Italy	Giovanni Pellielo	Giovanni Pellielo
2014 American Continental Championships	Dominican Republic	Eduardo Lorenzo	Eduardo Lorenzo
2015 ISSF World Cup # 1	Australia	Michael Diamond	Mitchell Iles
2015 ISSF World Cup # 1	Italy	Massimo Fabbrizi	Massimo Fabbrizi
2015 ISSF World Cup # 2	Croatia	Josip Glasnović	Josip Glasnović
2015 ISSF World Cup # 2	Czech Republic	David Kostelecký	David Kostelecký
2015 ISSF World Cup # 4	Turkey	Yavuz İlnam	Yavuz İlnam
2015 ISSF World Cup # 4	Finland	Vesa Törnroos	Vesa Törnroos
2015 European Games	Russia	Alexey Alipov	Alexey Alipov
2015 Pan American Games	Peru	Francisco Boza	Francisco Boza
2015 Pan American Games	Argentina	Fernando Borello	Fernando Borello
2015 European Championships	Spain	Alberto Fernández	Alberto Fernández
2015 European Championships	Slovenia	Boštjan Maček	Boštjan Maček
2015 European Championships	San Marino	Stefano Selva	Stefano Selva
2015 ISSF World Cup # 7	Croatia	Giovanni Cernogoraz	Giovanni Cernogoraz
2015 ISSF World Cup # 7	Turkey	Erdinç Kebapçı	Erdinç Kebapçı
2015 World Shotgun Championships	Kuwait	Khaled Al-Mudhaf	Khaled Al-Mudhaf
2015 World Shotgun Championships	Belgium	Maxime Mottet	Maxime Mottet
2015 Oceania Championships	Fiji	Glenn Kable	Glenn Kable
2015 Oceania Championships	Australia	Adam Vella	Adam Vella
2015 African Championships	Egypt	Abdel Aziz Mehelba	Abdel Aziz Mehelba
2016 Asian Olympic Qualifying Tournament	Kuwait	Abdulrahman Al-Faihan	Abdulrahman Al-Faihan
2016 Asian Olympic Qualifying Tournament	Chinese Taipei	Yang Kun-pi	Yang Kun-pi
2016 Asian Olympic Qualifying Tournament	India	Kynan Chenai	Kynan Chenai
2016 Asian Olympic Qualifying Tournament	Kazakhstan	Andrey Mogilevskiy^{[m]}	—
Exchange of quota places	Egypt	—N/a	Ahmed Kamar^{[n]}
Exchange of quota places	India	—N/a	Manavjit Singh Sandhu^{[a]}
Exchange of quota places	Slovakia	—N/a	Marián Kovačócy^{[d]}
Tripartite Commission Invitation	Angola	—N/a	João Paulo de Silva
Re-allocation of unused quota	Colombia	—N/a	Danilo Caro
Athletes qualified in other events	Morocco	—N/a	Mohamed Ramah
Total			33

== Double trap men ==
Event	Quota Places	Qualified athlete	Announced competitor
2014 World Championships	United States	Joshua Richmond	Joshua Richmond
2014 World Championships	Italy	Antonino Barillà	Antonino Barillà
2015 ISSF World Cup # 1	United States	Jeffrey Holguin	Walton Eller
2015 ISSF World Cup # 1	China	Hu Binyuan	Hu Binyuan
2015 ISSF World Cup # 2	Italy	Marco Innocenti	Marco Innocenti
2015 ISSF World Cup # 2	Russia	Vasily Mosin	Vasily Mosin
2015 ISSF World Cup # 4	Guatemala	Enrique Brol	Enrique Brol
2015 ISSF World Cup # 4	China	Pan Qiang	Pan Qiang
2015 European Games	Russia	Vitaly Fokeev	Vitaly Fokeev
2015 Pan American Games	Guatemala	Hebert Brol	Hebert Brol
2015 ISSF World Cup # 7	Germany	Michael Goldbrunner	Andreas Löw
2015 ISSF World Cup # 7	Great Britain	Steven Scott	Steven Scott
2015 World Shotgun Championships	Great Britain	Tim Kneale	Tim Kneale
2015 World Shotgun Championships	Kuwait	Ahmad Al-Afasi	Ahmad Al-Afasi
2015 Oceania Championships	Australia	James Willett	James Willett
2015 African Championships	Zimbabwe	Sean Nicholson	Sean Nicholson
2016 Asian Olympic Qualifying Tournament	United Arab Emirates	Khaled Al-Kaabi	Khaled Al-Kaabi
2016 Asian Olympic Qualifying Tournament	Kuwait	Fehaid Al-Deehani	Fehaid Al-Deehani
Exchange of quota places	Sweden	—N/a	Håkan Dahlby^{[e]}
Tripartite Commission Invitation	Malta	—N/a	William Chetcuti
Tripartite Commission Invitation	Paraguay	—N/a	Paulo Reichardt
Re-allocation of unused quota	Morocco	—N/a	Mohamed Ramah
Total			22

== Skeet men ==
Event	Quota places	Qualified athlete	Announced competitor
Host nation	Brazil	—N/a	Renato Portella
2014 World Championships	Russia	Alexander Zemlin	Anton Astakhov
2014 World Championships	France	Anthony Terras	Anthony Terras
2014 World Championships	Egypt	Azmy Mehelba	Azmy Mehelba
2014 American Continental Championships	United States	Vincent Hancock	Vincent Hancock
2015 ISSF World Cup # 1	Italy	Valerio Luchini	Luigi Lodde
2015 ISSF World Cup # 1	Italy	Riccardo Filippelli	Gabriele Rossetti
2015 ISSF World Cup # 2	Cyprus	Andreas Chasikos	Andreas Chasikos
2015 ISSF World Cup # 2	Denmark	Jesper Hansen	Jesper Hansen
2015 ISSF World Cup # 4	Sweden	Marcus Svensson	Marcus Svensson
2015 ISSF World Cup # 4	United Arab Emirates	Saif bin Futtais	Saif bin Futtais
2015 European Games	Sweden	Stefan Nilsson	Stefan Nilsson
2015 Pan American Games	United States	Thomas Bayer	Frank Thompson
2015 Pan American Games	Cuba	Juan Miguel Rodríguez	Juan Miguel Rodríguez
2015 European Championships	Greece	Efthimios Mitas	Efthimios Mitas
2015 European Championships	France	Éric Delaunay	Éric Delaunay
2015 European Championships	Ukraine	Mykola Milchev	Mykola Milchev
2015 ISSF World Cup # 7	Argentina	Federico Gil	Federico Gil
2015 ISSF World Cup # 7	Austria	Sebastian Kuntschik	Sebastian Kuntschik
2015 World Shotgun Championships	India	Mairaj Ahmad Khan	Mairaj Ahmad Khan
2015 World Shotgun Championships	Germany	Ralf Buchheim	Ralf Buchheim
2015 Oceania Championships	Australia	Keith Ferguson	Keith Ferguson
2015 Oceania Championships	Australia	James Bolding	Paul Adams
2015 African Championships	Egypt	Franco Donato	Franco Donato
2016 Asian Olympic Qualifying Tournament	Kuwait	Saud Habib	Saud Habib
2016 Asian Olympic Qualifying Tournament	United Arab Emirates	Saeed Al-Maktoum	Saeed Al-Maktoum
2016 Asian Olympic Qualifying Tournament	Qatar	Rashid Saleh Hamad	Rashid Saleh Hamad
2016 Asian Olympic Qualifying Tournament	Kuwait	Abdullah Al-Rashidi	Abdullah Al-Rashidi
Exchange of quota places	Qatar	—N/a	Nasser Al-Attiyah^{[f]}
Tripartite Commission Invitation	Barbados	—N/a	Michael Maskell
Re-allocation of unused quota	Latvia	—N/a	Dainis Upelnieks
Re-allocation of unused quota	Lithuania	—N/a	Ronaldas Račinskas
Total			32

== 50 m rifle three positions women ==
Event	Quota places	Qualified athlete	Announced competitor
2014 World Championships	Germany	Beate Gauß	Barbara Engleder
2014 World Championships	Croatia	Snježana Pejčić	Tanja Perec
2014 World Championships	Norway	Malin Westerheim	Malin Westerheim
2014 World Championships	China	Chen Dongqi	Du Li
2014 World Championships	Czech Republic	Nikola Mazurová	Nikola Mazurová
2014 American Continental Championships	Cuba	Dianelys Pérez	Dianelys Pérez
2015 ISSF World Cup # 3	Germany	Selina Gschwandtner	Eva Rösken
2015 ISSF World Cup # 3	China	Zhao Huixin	Zhang Binbin
2015 ISSF World Cup # 5	United States	Amy Sowash	Virginia Thrasher
2015 ISSF World Cup # 5	Kazakhstan	Yelizaveta Korol	Yelizaveta Korol
2015 ISSF World Cup # 6	South Korea	Yoo Seo-young	Jang Geum-young
2015 ISSF World Cup # 6	Ukraine	Natallia Kalnysh	Natallia Kalnysh
2015 European Games	France	Laurence Brize	Laurence Brize
2015 Pan American Games	Argentina	Amelia Fournel	Amelia Fournel
2015 Pan American Games	Puerto Rico	Yarimar Mercado	Yarimar Mercado
2015 European Championships	Great Britain	Jennifer McIntosh	Jennifer McIntosh
2015 European Championships	Poland	Agnieszka Nagay	Agnieszka Nagay
2015 European Championships	Czech Republic	Lucie Švecová	Adéla Sýkorová
2015 ISSF World Cup # 7	Poland	Sylwia Bogacka	Sylwia Bogacka
2015 ISSF World Cup # 7	Switzerland	Jasmin Michler	Nina Christen
2015 Oceania Championships	Australia	Emma Woodroofe^{[g]}	—
2015 African Championships	Egypt	Nourhan Amer^{[n]}	—
2016 Asian Olympic Qualifying Tournament	Singapore	Jasmine Ser Xiang Wei	Jasmine Ser Xiang Wei
2016 Asian Olympic Qualifying Tournament	Iran	Mahlagha Jambozorg	Mahlagha Jambozorg
2016 Asian Olympic Qualifying Tournament	South Korea	Lee Kye-rim	Lee Kye-rim
Athletes qualified in other events	Austria	—N/a	Olivia Hofmann
Athletes qualified in other events	Brazil	—N/a	Rosane Ewald
Athletes qualified in other events	Croatia	—N/a	Snježana Pejčić
Athletes qualified in other events	Cuba	—N/a	Eglis Yaima Cruz
Athletes qualified in other events	Denmark	—N/a	Stine Nielsen
Athletes qualified in other events	Hungary	—N/a	Julianna Miskolczi
Athletes qualified in other events	Iran	—N/a	Najmeh Khedmati
Athletes qualified in other events	Italy	—N/a	Petra Zublasing
Athletes qualified in other events	Mongolia	—N/a	Gankhuyagiin Nandinzayaa
Athletes qualified in other events	Russia	—N/a	Daria Vdovina
Athletes qualified in other events	Serbia	—N/a	Andrea Arsović
Athletes qualified in other events	Serbia	—N/a	Ivana Maksimović
Athletes qualified in other events	Slovenia	—N/a	Živa Dvoršak
Athletes qualified in other events	United States	—N/a	Sarah Scherer
Total			37

== 10 m air rifle women ==
Event	Quota places	Qualified athlete	Announced competitor
Host nation	Brazil	—N/a	Rosane Ewald
2014 World Championships	Italy	Petra Zublasing	Petra Zublasing
2014 World Championships	China	Yi Siling	Yi Siling
2014 World Championships	Germany	Sonja Pfeilschifter^{[j]}	—
2014 World Championships	China	Zhang Binbin	Du Li
2014 World Championships	Serbia	Andrea Arsović	Andrea Arsović
2014 World Championships	Denmark	Stine Nielsen	Stine Nielsen
2014 American Continental Championships	Cuba	Eglis Yaima Cruz	Eglis Yaima Cruz
2015 ISSF World Cup # 3	Serbia	Ivana Maksimović	Ivana Maksimović
2015 ISSF World Cup # 3	India	Apurvi Chandela	Apurvi Chandela
2015 ISSF World Cup # 3	Sweden	Michaela Arvidsson^{[e]}	—
2015 ISSF World Cup # 5	Mongolia	Gankhuyagiin Nandinzayaa	Gankhuyagiin Nandinzayaa
2015 ISSF World Cup # 5	United States	Sarah Beard	Sarah Scherer
2015 ISSF World Cup # 5	Egypt	Shimaa Hashad	Shimaa Hashad
2015 ISSF World Cup # 6	Croatia	Valentina Gustin	Valentina Gustin
2015 ISSF World Cup # 6	Austria	Olivia Hofmann	Olivia Hofmann
2015 ISSF World Cup # 6	Germany	Nina Laura Kreutzer	Selina Gschwandtner
2015 European Games	Switzerland	Sarah Hornung	Sarah Hornung
2015 Pan American Games	Mexico	Goretti Zumaya	Goretti Zumaya
2015 Pan American Games	Argentina	Fernanda Russo	Fernanda Russo
2015 ISSF World Cup # 7	Iran	Elaheh Ahmadi	Elaheh Ahmadi
2015 ISSF World Cup # 7	Iran	Najmeh Khedmati	Najmeh Khedmati
2015 ISSF World Cup # 7	Russia	Anna Zhukova	Daria Vdovina
2015 Oceania Championships	Australia	Jennifer Hens	Jennifer Hens
2015 African Championships	Egypt	Hadir Mekhimar	Hadir Mekhimar
2016 Asian Olympic Qualifying Tournament	India	Ayonika Paul	Ayonika Paul
2016 Asian Olympic Qualifying Tournament	South Korea	Lee Eun-seo	Kim Eun-hye
2016 European Championships 10m events	Switzerland	Petra Lustenberger^{[i]}	—
2016 European Championships 10m events	Croatia	Tanja Perec	Snježana Pejčić
2016 European Championships 10m events	Hungary	Julianna Miskolczi	Julianna Miskolczi
Exchange of quota places	Slovenia	—N/a	Živa Dvoršak^{[h]}
Exchange of quota places	South Korea	—N/a	Park Hae-mi^{[l]}
Tripartite Commission Invitation	Andorra	—N/a	Esther Barrugués
Tripartite Commission Invitation	Bhutan	—N/a	Kunzang Lenchu
Tripartite Commission Invitation	Bolivia	—N/a	Carina García
Tripartite Commission Invitation	Bosnia and Herzegovina	—N/a	Tatjana Đekanović
Tripartite Commission Invitation	Kosovo	—N/a	Urata Rama
Tripartite Commission Invitation	Macedonia	—N/a	Nina Balaban
Tripartite Commission Invitation	Pakistan	—N/a	Minhal Sohail
Athletes qualified in other events	Argentina	—N/a	Amelia Fournel
Athletes qualified in other events	Cuba	—N/a	Dianelys Pérez
Athletes qualified in other events	Czech Republic	—N/a	Nikola Mazurová
Athletes qualified in other events	Czech Republic	—N/a	Adéla Sýkorová
Athletes qualified in other events	Germany	—N/a	Barbara Engleder^{[j]}
Athletes qualified in other events	Great Britain	—N/a	Jennifer McIntosh
Athletes qualified in other events	Kazakhstan	—N/a	Yelizaveta Korol
Athletes qualified in other events	Norway	—N/a	Malin Westerheim
Athletes qualified in other events	Poland	—N/a	Sylwia Bogacka
Athletes qualified in other events	Poland	—N/a	Agnieszka Nagay
Athletes qualified in other events	Puerto Rico	—N/a	Yarimar Mercado
Athletes qualified in other events	Singapore	—N/a	Jasmine Ser
Athletes qualified in other events	Switzerland	—N/a	Nina Christen^{[i]}
Athletes qualified in other events	Ukraine	—N/a	Natallia Kalnysh
Athletes qualified in other events	United States	—N/a	Virginia Thrasher
Total			51

== 25 m pistol women ==
Event	Quota places	Qualified athlete	Announced competitor
2014 World Championships	China	Zhang Jingjing	Zhang Jingjing
2014 World Championships	South Korea	Kim Jang-mi	Kim Jang-mi
2014 World Championships	Hungary	Renáta Tobai-Sike	Renáta Tobai-Sike
2014 World Championships	North Korea	Jo Yong-suk	Jo Yong-suk
2014 World Championships	France	Stéphanie Tirode	Stéphanie Tirode
2014 American Continental Championships	Ecuador	Andrea Pérez Peña	Andrea Pérez Peña
2015 ISSF World Cup # 3	Mongolia	Otryadyn Gündegmaa	Otryadyn Gündegmaa
2015 ISSF World Cup # 3	China	Lin Yuemei	Chen Ying
2015 ISSF World Cup # 5	France	Mathilde Lamolle	Mathilde Lamolle
2015 ISSF World Cup # 5	Bulgaria	Antoaneta Boneva	Antoaneta Boneva
2015 ISSF World Cup # 6	Thailand	Tanyaporn Prucksakorn	Tanyaporn Prucksakorn
2015 ISSF World Cup # 6	Russia	Yuliya Alipava	Ekaterina Korshunova
2015 European Games	Switzerland	Heidi Diethelm Gerber	Heidi Diethelm Gerber
2015 Pan American Games	United States	Sandra Uptagrafft	Enkelejda Shehu
2015 European Championships	Hungary	Zsófia Csonka	Zsófia Csonka
2015 European Championships	Georgia	Nino Salukvadze	Nino Salukvadze
2015 ISSF World Cup # 7	Russia	Vitalina Batsarashkina	Vitalina Batsarashkina
2015 ISSF World Cup # 7	Mongolia	Tsogbadrakhyn Mönkhzul	Tsogbadrakhyn Mönkhzul
2015 Oceania Championships	Australia	Elena Galiabovitch	Elena Galiabovitch
2015 African Championships	Tunisia	Olfa Charni	Olfa Charni
2016 Asian Olympic Qualifying Tournament	South Korea	Koh Eun	Hwang Seong-eun
2016 Asian Olympic Qualifying Tournament	Japan	Akiko Sato	Akiko Sato
2016 Asian Olympic Qualifying Tournament	Singapore	Teo Shun Xie	Teo Shun Xie
Exchange of quota places	Germany	—N/a	Monika Karsch^{[j]}
Athletes qualified in other events	Australia	—N/a	Lalita Yauhleuskaya
Athletes qualified in other events	Belarus	—N/a	Viktoria Chaika
Athletes qualified in other events	Canada	—N/a	Lynda Kiejko
Athletes qualified in other events	Egypt	—N/a	Afaf El-Hodhod
Athletes qualified in other events	Spain	—N/a	Sonia Franquet
Athletes qualified in other events	Greece	—N/a	Anna Korakaki
Athletes qualified in other events	India	—N/a	Heena Sidhu
Athletes qualified in other events	Iran	—N/a	Golnoush Sebghatollahi
Athletes qualified in other events	Malta	—N/a	Eleanor Bezzina
Athletes qualified in other events	Poland	—N/a	Klaudia Breś
Athletes qualified in other events	Serbia	—N/a	Zorana Arunović
Athletes qualified in other events	Serbia	—N/a	Bobana Veličković
Athletes qualified in other events	Chinese Taipei	—N/a	Wu Chia-ying
Athletes qualified in other events	Chinese Taipei	—N/a	Yu Ai-wen
Athletes qualified in other events	Thailand	—N/a	Pim-on Klaisuban
Athletes qualified in other events	Ukraine	—N/a	Olena Kostevych
Total			40

== 10 m air pistol women ==
Event	Quota places	Qualified athlete	Announced competitor
2014 World Championships	South Korea	Jung Jee-hae	Kim Min-jung
2014 World Championships	Ukraine	Olena Kostevych	Olena Kostevych
2014 World Championships	Chinese Taipei	Wu Chia-ying	Wu Chia-ying
2014 World Championships	Slovenia	Petra Dobravec^{[h]}	—
2014 World Championships	Spain	Sonia Franquet	Sonia Franquet
2014 World Championships	Serbia	Jasna Šekarić	Zorana Arunović
2014 American Continental Championships	El Salvador	Lilian Castro	Lilian Castro
2015 ISSF World Cup # 3	Russia	Liubov Yaskevich	Ekaterina Korshunova
2015 ISSF World Cup # 3	China	Zhang Mengxue	Zhang Mengxue
2015 ISSF World Cup # 3	South Korea	Kwak Jung-hye	Kwak Jung-hye
2015 ISSF World Cup # 5	Greece	Anna Korakaki	Anna Korakaki
2015 ISSF World Cup # 5	Mexico	Alejandra Zavala	Alejandra Zavala
2015 ISSF World Cup # 5	Chinese Taipei	Yu Ai-wen	Yu Ai-wen
2015 ISSF World Cup # 6	China	Guo Wenjun	Guo Wenjun
2015 ISSF World Cup # 6	Serbia	Bobana Veličković	Bobana Veličković
2015 ISSF World Cup # 6	United States	Lydia Paterson	Lydia Paterson
2015 European Games	Belarus	Viktoria Chaika	Viktoria Chaika
2015 Pan American Games	Canada	Lynda Kiejko	Lynda Kiejko
2015 ISSF World Cup # 7	Russia	Olga Kuznetsova	Vitalina Batsarashkina
2015 ISSF World Cup # 7	France	Céline Goberville	Céline Goberville
2015 ISSF World Cup # 7	Thailand	Pim-on Klaisuban	Pim-on Klaisuban
2015 Oceania Championships	Australia	Lalita Yauhleuskaya	Lalita Yauhleuskaya
2015 African Championships	Egypt	Afaf El-Hodhod	Afaf El-Hodhod
2016 Asian Olympic Qualifying Tournament	India	Heena Sidhu	Heena Sidhu
2016 Asian Olympic Qualifying Tournament	Iran	Golnoush Sebghatollahi	Golnoush Sebghatollahi
2016 European Championships 10m events	Hungary	Viktória Egri	Viktória Egri
2016 European Championships 10m events	Croatia	Marija Marović	Marija Marović
2016 European Championships 10m events	Poland	Beata Bartków-Kwiatkowska	Klaudia Breś
Tripartite Commission Invitation	Malta	—N/a	Eleanor Bezzina
Tripartite Commission Invitation	Oman	—N/a	Wadha Al-Balushi
Athletes qualified in other events	Australia	—N/a	Elena Galiabovitch
Athletes qualified in other events	Bulgaria	—N/a	Antoaneta Boneva
Athletes qualified in other events	France	—N/a	Stéphanie Tirode
Athletes qualified in other events	Georgia	—N/a	Nino Salukvadze
Athletes qualified in other events	Germany	—N/a	Monika Karsch
Athletes qualified in other events	Hungary	—N/a	Renáta Tobai-Sike
Athletes qualified in other events	Japan	—N/a	Akiko Sato
Athletes qualified in other events	Mongolia	—N/a	Otryadyn Gündegmaa
Athletes qualified in other events	Mongolia	—N/a	Tsogbadrakhyn Mönkhzul
Athletes qualified in other events	North Korea	—N/a	Jo Yong-suk
Athletes qualified in other events	Singapore	—N/a	Teo Shun Xie
Athletes qualified in other events	Switzerland	—N/a	Heidi Diethelm Gerber
Athletes qualified in other events	Thailand	—N/a	Tanyaporn Prucksakorn
Athletes qualified in other events	Tunisia	—N/a	Olfa Charni
Athletes qualified in other events	United States	—N/a	Enkelejda Shehu
Total			44

== Trap women ==
Event	Quota places	Qualified athlete	Announced competitor
Host nation	Brazil	—N/a	Janice Teixeira
2014 World Championships	Germany	Katrin Quooß	Jana Beckmann
2014 World Championships	Spain	Fátima Gálvez	Fátima Gálvez
2014 World Championships	Australia	Catherine Skinner	Catherine Skinner
2015 ISSF World Cup # 1	United States	Corey Cogdell	Corey Cogdell
2015 ISSF World Cup # 1	Australia	Laetisha Scanlan	Laetisha Scanlan
2015 ISSF World Cup # 2	Italy	Silvana Stanco	Jessica Rossi
2015 ISSF World Cup # 2	San Marino	Alessandra Perilli	Alessandra Perilli
2015 ISSF World Cup # 4	Finland	Satu Mäkelä-Nummela	Satu Mäkelä-Nummela
2015 ISSF World Cup # 4	Russia	Tatiana Barsuk	Tatiana Barsuk
2015 European Games	San Marino	Arianna Perilli	Arianna Perilli
2015 Pan American Games	Canada	Amanda Chudoba	Cynthia Meyer
2015 European Championships	Slovakia	Zuzana Štefečeková^{[d]}	—
2015 ISSF World Cup # 7	Japan	Yukie Nakayama	Yukie Nakayama
2015 ISSF World Cup # 7	Chinese Taipei	Lin Yi-chun	Lin Yi-chun
2015 World Shotgun Championships	Russia	Elena Tkach	Ekaterina Rabaya
2015 World Shotgun Championships	North Korea	Pak Yong-hui	Pak Yong-hui
2015 Oceania Championships	New Zealand	Natalie Rooney	Natalie Rooney
2015 African Championships	Namibia	Gaby Ahrens	Gaby Ahrens
2016 Asian Olympic Qualifying Tournament	China	Li Qingnian	Chen Fang
Exchange of quota places	Kazakhstan	—N/a	Mariya Dmitriyenko^{[m]}
Tripartite Commission Invitation	Lebanon	—N/a	Ray Bassil
Total			21

== Skeet women ==
Event	Quota places	Qualified athlete	Announced competitor
Host nation	Brazil	—N/a	Daniela Carraro
2014 World Championships	United States	Brandy Drozd	Morgan Craft
2014 World Championships	Great Britain	Elena Allen	Elena Allen
2014 World Championships	Slovakia	Danka Barteková	Danka Barteková
2015 ISSF World Cup # 1	United States	Kimberly Rhode	Kimberly Rhode
2015 ISSF World Cup # 1	China	Wei Meng	Wei Meng
2015 ISSF World Cup # 2	Italy	Diana Bacosi	Diana Bacosi
2015 ISSF World Cup # 2	Italy	Chiara Cainero	Chiara Cainero
2015 ISSF World Cup # 4	China	Yu Xiumin	Wei Ning
2015 ISSF World Cup # 4	Thailand	Sutiya Jiewchaloemmit	Sutiya Jiewchaloemmit
2015 European Games	Great Britain	Amber Hill	Amber Hill
2015 Pan American Games	Argentina	Melisa Gil	Melisa Gil
2015 European Championships	Germany	Christine Wenzel	Christine Wenzel
2015 ISSF World Cup # 7	Poland	Aleksandra Jarmolińska	Aleksandra Jarmolińska
2015 ISSF World Cup # 7	Chile	Francisca Crovetto	Francisca Crovetto
2015 World Shotgun Championships	Cyprus	Andri Eleftheriou	Andri Eleftheriou
2015 World Shotgun Championships	Czech Republic	Libuše Jahodová	Libuše Jahodová
2015 Oceania Championships	New Zealand	Chloe Tipple	Chloe Tipple
2016 Asian Olympic Qualifying Tournament	Japan	Naoko Ishihara	Naoko Ishihara
Exchange of quota places	Australia	—N/a	Aislin Jones^{[g]}
Exchange of quota places	Russia	—N/a	Albina Shakirova
Total			21

== Notes ==
- ^{a} Sanjeev Rajput secured a second quota place for India in the men's 50 m rifle positions, but the slot was occupied by Gagan Narang as a double starter based on his cumulative scores at the national selection trials. As a result, the NRAI decided to exchange it with an additional men's trap spot, which was awarded to Manavjit Singh Sandhu.
- ^{b} A total of eighteen shooters were provisionally named to the Chinese team, including two double starters, at the end of Olympic trials for rifle and shooting. As per ISSF rules, China had decided to exchange one of them with the men's 50 m rifle prone spot, which was awarded to Zhao Shengbo. Hence, the remaining berth was returned to ISSF for reallocation.
- ^{c} Host nation Brazil had been awarded a minimum of nine quota places in select events with only six shooters using the vacancies for the Games. Almeida Wu and Rippel attained a direct nomination to the Olympic team to leave the vacancies unused for reallocation. With a lack of shooters in women's 10 m air pistol, the Brazilian Shooting Federation decided to exchange it with the men's 50 m pistol, which was awarded to Júlio Almeida.
- ^{d} Slovakia secured a quota place in the women's trap at the 2015 European Shooting Championships, but Zuzana Štefečeková withdrew from the Games due to her pregnancy. Instead, Slovak Olympic Committee chose to exchange it with an additional spot in its counterpart based on performances throughout the qualifying period. The slot was occupied by Marián Kovačócy.
- ^{e} Sweden secured a quota place in the women's 10 m air rifle at the 2015 ISSF World Cup meet in Changwon, but the Swedish Olympic Committee chose to exchange it with the men's double trap instead based on performances throughout the qualifying period. The slot was occupied by London 2012 silver medalist Håkan Dahlby.
- ^{f} Qatar secured a quota place in the men's 50 m rifle 3 positions at the 2016 Asian Olympic Qualifying Tournament in Delhi, but the Qatar Olympic Committee chose to exchange it with an additional spot in the men's skeet instead based on performances throughout the qualifying period. The slot was occupied by five-time Olympian and London 2012 bronze medalist Nasser Al-Attiyah.
- ^{g} Australia secured a quota place in the women's 50 m rifle 3 positions at the 2016 Oceania Championships in Sydney, but Shooting Australia, in conjunction with the Australian Olympic Committee, chose to exchange it with the women's skeet instead based on performances throughout the qualifying period and selection trials. The slot was occupied by Aislin Jones.
- ^{h} Slovenia secured a quota place in the women's 10 m air pistol at the 2014 ISSF World Championships in Granada, Spain, but the Slovenian Olympic Committee chose to exchange it with the women's rifle events instead based on performances throughout the qualifying period. The slot was occupied by London 2012 Olympian Živa Dvoršak.
- ^{i} Two shooters secured quota places (won by Petra Lustenberger and Jasmin Michler) for Switzerland in the women's rifle events, but both of these places were occupied by Nina Christen as a double starter. Therefore, the Swiss Olympic Association decided to exchange one of them with the men's 50 m rifle three positions, which was awarded to Jan Lochbichler.
- ^{j} Two shooters secured quota places (won by Beate Gauss and Sonja Pfeilschifter) for Germany in the women's rifle events, but both of these places were occupied by Barbara Engleder as a double starter. Therefore, the German Shooting Federation had decided to exchange one of them with the women's 25 m pistol which was awarded to Monika Karsch.
- ^{k} Italy secured an additional quota place in the men's 50 m pistol at the 2015 European Shooting Championships, but the Italian Olympic Committee and the Italian Sport Shooting Federation (UITS) chose to exchange it with the men's 25 m rapid fire pistol instead based on performances throughout the qualifying period. The slot was occupied by Riccardo Mazzetti.
- ^{l} Kim Cheong-yong secured a second quota place for Korea in the men's 10 m air pistol, but the slot was occupied by Jin Jong-oh as a double starter based on his cumulative scores at the national selection trials. As a result, the Korean Shooting Federation decided to exchange it with an additional women's 10 m air rifle spot, which was awarded to Park Hae-mi.
- ^{m} Kazakhstan secured a quota place in the men's trap at the 2015 Asia Olympic Qualifying Competition and exchanged it for a women's trap quota place. The slot was occupied by Mariya Dmitriyenko.
- ^{n} Nourhan Amer secured a quota place for Egypt in the women's 50 m rifle three positions, but her quota place was exchanged for a second place in the men's trap, which was awarded to Ahmed Kamar.
