= Shooting at the 2016 Summer Olympics =

Shooting at the Games of the XXXI Olympiad
- Venue: National Shooting Center
- Dates: 6–14 August 2016
- No. of events: 15
- Competitors: 390

Shooting competitions at the 2016 Summer Olympics in Rio de Janeiro took place from 6 to 14 August at the National Shooting Center in Deodoro. A maximum of 390 athletes were able to compete in the fifteen events across these Games. The event format was similar to 2012, although there were significant changes to the rules and guidelines of the competition.

== Format changes ==
On 23 November 2012, the International Shooting Sport Federation instituted new rules to the competition format designed to enhance the sport's appeal to youth, to make it more spectator and media friendly, and to keep the competitions fair and transparent. The most significant change to the rules was the new final format for all Olympic events, where all finalists must start from scratch. Furthermore, all finals featured an elimination stage, until the competition ended up with duels between the two shooters to decide the gold and silver medals. Other ratified changes included decimal scoring for both air rifle and rifle prone, separate sighting and match firing periods, limited use of performance-enhancing rifle clothing and equipment, target throwing distance in skeet shooting, and adjustment of targets in the double trap.

== Qualification ==
The qualification system was similar to that used for previous Games, with a fixed number of quota places divided among the nations whose shooters place well at top-level global and continental championships. As per the guidelines from the International Shooting Sport Federation, qualification commenced with the 2014 ISSF World Shooting Championships in Granada, Spain, which concluded on 19 September 2014, two years before the Olympics. Throughout the process, quota places were generally awarded when a shooter earns a gold medal in an ISSF World Cup series or posts a top finish at the ISSF World Championships or the continental championships (Africa, Europe, Asia, Oceania, and the Americas).

Brazil did not qualify through the World Championships, rather its nine places were guaranteed due to it being the host nation.

== Schedule ==
Legend
Q	Qualification	F	Final

Event↓/Date →	Sat 6		Sun 7		Mon 8		Tue 9		Wed 10		Thu 11		Fri 12		Sat 13	Sun 14	
Rifle
Men's 10 m air rifle					Q	F											
Men's 50 m rifle prone													Q	F			
Men's 50 m rifle 3 positions																Q	F
Women's 10 m air rifle	Q	F															
Women's 50 m rifle 3 positions											Q	F					
Pistol
Men's 10 m air pistol	Q	F															
Men's 25 m rapid fire pistol													Q		F		
Men's 50 m pistol									Q	F							
Women's 10 m air pistol			Q	F													
Women's 25 m pistol							Q	F									
Shotgun
Men's trap			Q			F											
Men's double trap									Q	F							
Men's skeet													Q		F		
Women's trap			Q	F													
Women's skeet													Q	F			

== Participation ==
=== Participating nations ===
- Algeria (1)
- Andorra (1)
- Angola (1)
- Argentina (5)
- Armenia (1)
- Australia (18)
- Austria (5)
- Azerbaijan (1)
- Bahrain (1)
- Bangladesh (1)
- Barbados (1)
- Belarus (4)
- Belgium (1)
- Bhutan (1)
- Bolivia (2)
- Bosnia and Herzegovina (1)
- Brazil (9)
- Bulgaria (3)
- Canada (2)
- Chile (1)
- China (22)
- Colombia (1)
- Croatia (7)
- Cuba (7)
- Cyprus (2)
- Czech Republic (5)
- Denmark (3)
- Dominican Republic (1)
- Ecuador (1)
- Egypt (12)
- El Salvador (1)
- Estonia (1)
- Fiji (1)
- Finland (2)
- France (11)
- Georgia (2)
- Germany (15)
- Great Britain (6)
- Greece (2)
- Guatemala (2)
- Hungary (8)
- India (12)
- Iran (5)
- Israel (1)
- Italy (14)
- Japan (8)
- Kazakhstan (5)
- Kosovo (1)
- Independent Olympic Athletes (6)
- Latvia (1)
- Lebanon (1)
- Lithuania (1)
- Macedonia (1)
- Malaysia (1)
- Malta (2)
- Mexico (2)
- Mongolia (3)
- Morocco (1)
- Myanmar (1)
- Namibia (1)
- New Zealand (3)
- Nicaragua (1)
- North Korea (4)
- Norway (4)
- Oman (2)
- Pakistan (2)
- Panama (1)
- Paraguay (1)
- Peru (2)
- Poland (5)
- Portugal (1)
- Puerto Rico (1)
- Qatar (2)
- Romania (1)
- Russia (18)
- San Marino (3)
- Saudi Arabia (1)
- Serbia (9)
- Singapore (2)
- Slovakia (5)
- Slovenia (2)
- South Korea (17)
- Spain (6)
- Sri Lanka (1)
- Sweden (3)
- Switzerland (4)
- Chinese Taipei (4)
- Thailand (5)
- Tunisia (1)
- Turkey (4)
- Ukraine (8)
- United Arab Emirates (3)
- United States (20)
- Uzbekistan (1)
- Venezuela (1)
- Vietnam (2)
- Zimbabwe (1)

== Medal summary ==
=== Medal table ===
* Host nation (Brazil)

Rank	Nation	Gold	Silver	Bronze	Total
1	Italy	4	3	0	7
2	Germany	3	1	0	4
3	China	1	2	4	7
4	South Korea	1	1	0	2
4	Vietnam	1	1	0	2
6	United States	1	0	2	3
7	Greece	1	0	1	2
7	Independent Olympic Athletes	1	0	1	2
9	Australia	1	0	0	1
9	Croatia	1	0	0	1
11	Russia	0	2	2	4
12	France	0	1	1	2
13	Brazil*	0	1	0	1
13	New Zealand	0	1	0	1
13	Sweden	0	1	0	1
13	Ukraine	0	1	0	1
17	Great Britain	0	0	2	2
18	North Korea	0	0	1	1
18	Switzerland	0	0	1	1
Totals (19 entries)		15	15	15	45

=== Men's events ===
Games	Gold	Silver	Bronze
10 meter air pistol	Hoàng Xuân Vinh; Vietnam OR	Felipe Almeida Wu; Brazil	Pang Wei; China
25 meter rapid fire pistol	Christian Reitz; Germany	Jean Quiquampoix; France	Li Yuehong; China
50 meter pistol	Jin Jong-oh; South Korea OR	Hoàng Xuân Vinh; Vietnam	Kim Song-guk; North Korea
10 meter air rifle	Niccolò Campriani; Italy OR	Serhiy Kulish; Ukraine	Vladimir Maslennikov; Russia
50 meter rifle prone	Henri Junghänel; Germany OR	Kim Jong-hyun; South Korea	Kirill Grigoryan; Russia
50 meter rifle three positions	Niccolò Campriani; Italy OR	Sergey Kamenskiy; Russia	Alexis Raynaud; France
Skeet	Gabriele Rossetti; Italy	Marcus Svensson; Sweden	Abdullah Al-Rashidi; Independent Olympic Athletes
Trap	Josip Glasnović; Croatia	Giovanni Pellielo; Italy	Edward Ling; Great Britain
Double trap	Fehaid Al-Deehani; Independent Olympic Athletes	Marco Innocenti; Italy	Steven Scott; Great Britain

=== Women's events ===
Games	Gold	Silver	Bronze
10 meter air pistol	Zhang Mengxue; China OR	Vitalina Batsarashkina; Russia	Anna Korakaki; Greece
25 meter pistol	Anna Korakaki; Greece	Monika Karsch; Germany	Heidi Diethelm Gerber; Switzerland
10 meter air rifle	Virginia Thrasher; United States OR	Du Li; China	Yi Siling; China
50 meter rifle three positions	Barbara Engleder; Germany	Zhang Binbin; China	Du Li; China
Skeet	Diana Bacosi; Italy	Chiara Cainero; Italy	Kim Rhode; United States
Trap	Catherine Skinner; Australia	Natalie Rooney; New Zealand	Corey Cogdell; United States

== See also ==
- Shooting at the 2016 Summer Paralympics
