= David Higgins =

David Higgins may refer to:

- David Higgins (golfer) (born 1972), Irish professional golfer
- David Higgins (archer) (born 1968), Australian Paralympic archer
- David Anthony Higgins (born 1961), American comedic actor
- David Higgins (businessman) (born 1954), chairman of United Utilities
- David Higgins (merchant) (died 1783), ship's captain, merchant, early settler and political figure on St John's Island (later Prince Edward Island)
- David Higgins (rally driver) (born 1972), British rally driver
- David Higgins (rower) (born 1947), American Olympic rower
- David Higgins (sport shooter) (born 1994), American sport shooter
- David Williams Higgins (1834–1917), Canadian journalist, politician, and author
- David Higgins (Ohio politician) (1789–1873), politician and judge from the U.S. State of Ohio
- David Higgins (event promoter) (born 1979), Boxing Promoter from New Zealand
- David Higgins (Mississippi politician) (c. 1823 – ?), Mississippi politician
