= 2016 in shooting =

This article lists the main target shooting events and their results for 2016.

== World Events ==
=== Olympic & Paralympic Games ===
The 2016 Olympic Games & 2016 Paralympic Games were held in Rio de Janeiro.

- Shooting at the 2016 Summer Olympics – Qualification
- Shooting at the 2016 Summer Olympics
- Shooting at the 2016 Summer Paralympics – Qualification
- Shooting at the 2016 Summer Paralympics

=== International Shooting Sport Federation ===
- July 14–23: 2016 World Running Target Championships held in Suhl, Germany

==== ISSF World Cup ====
- 2016 ISSF World Cup
- 2016 ISSF Junior World Cup

=== FITASC ===
2016 Results

== Regional Events ==
=== Asia ===
==== 2016 Asian Olympic Shooting Qualifying Tournament ====
- January 27 - February 3: 2016 Asian Olympic Shooting Qualifying Tournament held in New Delhi, India. The tournament was arranged to distribute Olympic Quota places for the Summer Olympics in Rio de Janeiro after the 2015 Asian Shooting Championships were stripped of their quota-awarding status following the IOC suspension of the Kuwait National Olympic Committee.

==== Asian Shooting Championships ====
- December 3–9: 2016 Asian Airgun Championships held at the Azadi Sport Complex in Tehran, Iran
- November 1–9: 2016 Asian Shotgun Championships in Abu Dhabi, United Arab Emirates

==== South Asian Games ====
- February 10–15: Shooting at the 2016 South Asian Games in Guwahati, India

=== Europe ===
==== European Shooting Confederation ====
- February 22–28: 2016 European 10 m Events Championships held at the Audi Aréna in Győr, Hungary
- June 12–19: 2016 European Junior Shooting Championships held at the Männiku Shooting Range in Tallinn, Estonia
- July 4–12: 2016 European Shotgun Championships in Lonato del Garda, Italy

==== "B Matches" ====
- February 4–6: InterShoot in Den Haag, Netherlands
- December 14–17: RIAC held in Strassen, Luxembourg

== National Events ==
=== United Kingdom ===
==== NRA Imperial Meeting ====
- July, held at the National Shooting Centre, Bisley
  - Queen's Prize winner: David Calvert (NIR)
  - Grand Aggregate winner: J Corbett
  - Ashburton Shield winners: Wellington College
  - Kolapore Winners: Great Britain (GBR)
  - National Trophy Winners: Wales (WAL)
  - Elcho Shield winners: England (ENG)
  - Vizianagram winners: Tied

==== NSRA National Meeting ====
- August, held at the National Shooting Centre, Bisley
  - Earl Roberts British Prone Champion: Richard Wilson (GBR)

=== USA ===
- 2016 NCAA Rifle Championships, won by West Virginia Mountaineers
