= Shooting at the 2016 Summer Olympics – Men's 50 metre rifle prone =

Men's 50 metre rifle prone at the Games of the XXXI Olympiad
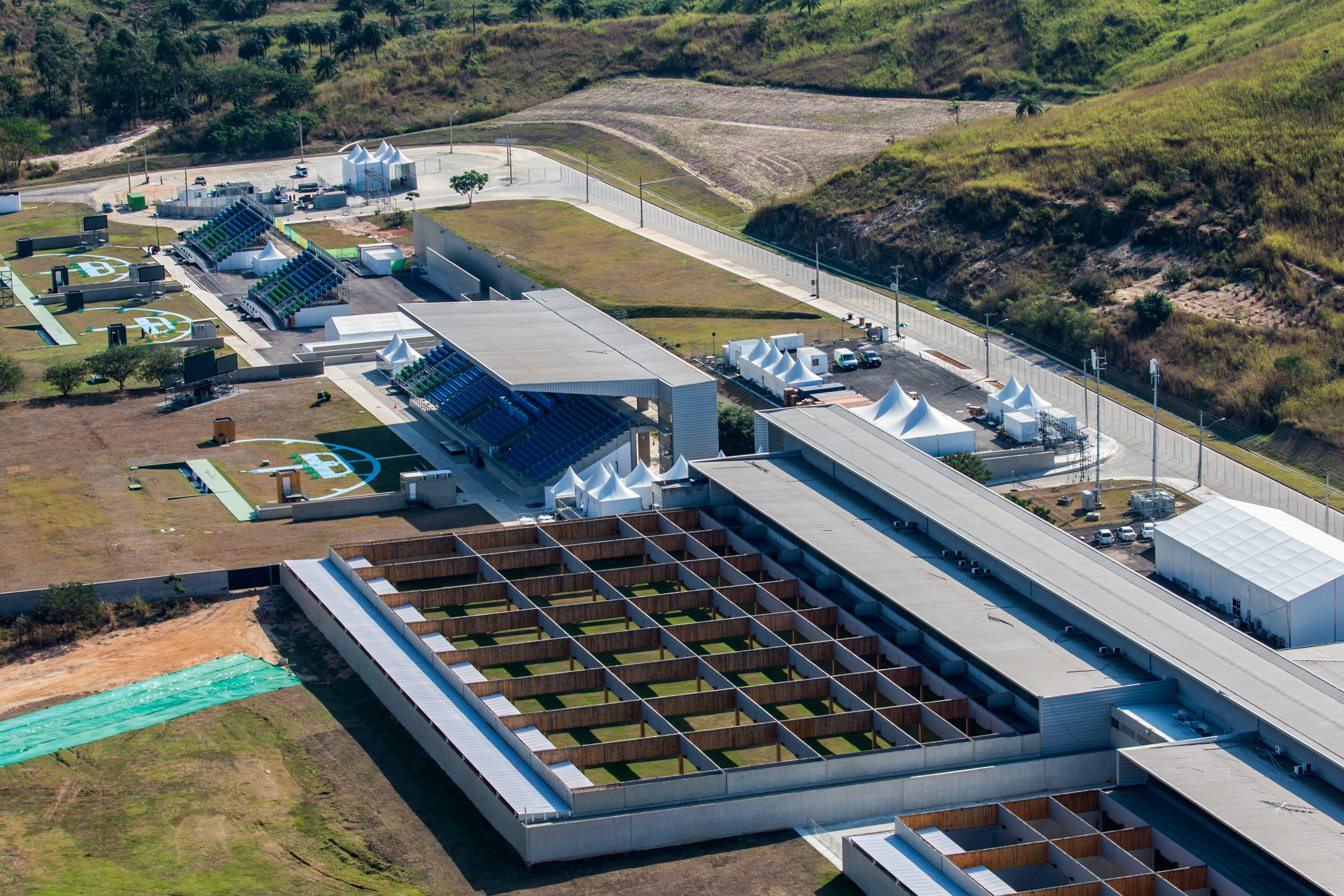
- Aerial view of the National Shooting Center in Deodoro, where the men's 50 metre rifle prone event took place.
- Venue: National Shooting Center
- Date: 12 August 2016
- Competitors: 47 from 31 nations
- Winning score: 209.5 OR

Medalists
1st place, gold medalist(s)		Henri Junghänel	Germany
2nd place, silver medalist(s)		Kim Jong-hyun	South Korea
3rd place, bronze medalist(s)		Kirill Grigoryan	Russia

The men's 50 metre rifle prone event at the 2016 Olympic Games took place on 12 August 2016 at the National Shooting Center.

The event consisted of two rounds: a qualifier and a final. In the qualifier, each shooter fired 60 shots with a .22 long rifle at 50 metres distance from the prone position. Scores for each shot were in increments of 1, with a maximum score of 10.

The top 8 shooters in the qualifying round moved on to the final round. There, they fired an additional 10 shots. These shots were scored in increments of .1, with a maximum score of 10.9. The total score from all 70 shots were used to determine final ranking.

The medals were presented by Syed Shahid Ali, IOC member, Pakistan and Yair Davidovich, Council Member of the International Shooting Sport Federation.

== Records ==
Prior to this competition, the existing world and Olympic records were as follows.

Qualification records
World record	Sergey Kamenskiy (RUS)	633.0	Maribor, Slovenia	21 July 2015
Olympic record	ISSF Rule changed on January 1, 2013	—	—	—

Final records
World record	Henri Junghänel (GER)	211.2	Munich, Germany	11 November 2013
Olympic record	ISSF Rule changed on January 1, 2013	—	—	—

== Qualification round ==
Rank	Athlete	Country	1	2	3	4	5	6	Total	Inner 10s	Notes
1	Sergey Kamenskiy	Russia	103.9	105.1	106.0	104.7	105.2	104.1	629.0		Q, OR
2	Kirill Grigoryan	Russia	105.2	104.8	105.2	104.1	104.9	104.7	628.9		Q
3	Kim Jong-hyun	South Korea	103.1	105.6	103.9	104.9	105.2	105.4	628.1		Q
4	Vitali Bubnovich	Belarus	103.5	104.6	103.5	105.9	104.7	104.0	626.2		Q
5	Marco De Nicolo	Italy	104.2	102.6	104.1	104.8	105.1	105.2	626.0		Q
6	Niccolò Campriani	Italy	103.7	103.8	104.3	103.9	104.2	105.4	625.3		Q
7	Attapon Uea-aree	Thailand	104.5	103.9	104.2	104.8	105.6	102.3	625.3		Q
8	Henri Junghänel	Germany	104.1	105.1	103.6	105.2	103.8	103.0	624.8		Q
9	Cyril Graff	France	105.3	103.3	102.8	103.7	104.3	104.9	624.3		
10	Péter Sidi	Hungary	102.8	104.7	103.0	103.8	104.1	104.9	623.3		
11	Kwon Jun-cheol	South Korea	103.0	103.8	103.6	104.0	104.3	104.5	623.2		
12	Oleh Tsarkov	Ukraine	103.3	105.0	103.7	104.4	103.5	103.2	623.1		
13	Gagan Narang	India	104.7	104.4	104.6	103.0	104.0	102.4	623.1		
14	Jan Lochbichler	Switzerland	104.3	103.0	105.5	104.0	102.8	103.4	623.0		
15	Sergey Richter	Israel	102.0	102.1	105.6	104.2	105.1	103.6	622.6		
16	Ryan Taylor	New Zealand	102.6	102.7	103.5	103.2	104.8	105.6	622.4		
17	Thomas Mathis	Austria	103.3	102.9	104.5	103.2	104.2	104.3	622.4		
18	Yury Shcherbatsevich	Belarus	103.9	102.8	105.1	103.6	103.3	103.4	622.1		
19	Michael McPhail	United States	103.9	103.4	104.8	103.7	103.5	102.7	622.0		
20	Petar Gorša	Croatia	103.5	103.9	100.9	104.7	104.6	104.3	621.9		
21	Stevan Pletikosić	Serbia	101.5	102.5	103.8	104.2	105.9	103.7	621.6		
22	Julio Iemma	Venezuela	103.7	103.7	102.0	104.1	104.6	103.4	621.5		
23	Torben Grimmel	Denmark	103.7	104.6	102.8	103.0	103.9	103.7	621.4		
24	Alexander Schmirl	Austria	103.1	103.5	104.5	106.0	101.3	103.0	621.4		
25	Yuriy Yurkov	Kazakhstan	104.6	104.7	102.7	102.8	104.4	104.2	621.4		
26	Cassio Rippel	Brazil	105.3	104.2	103.2	103.5	102.4	102.7	621.3		
27	Anton Rizov	Bulgaria	104.6	104.2	103.2	102.5	102.2	104.5	621.2		
28	Odd Arne Brekne	Norway	103.3	103.5	101.4	103.8	103.4	105.5	620.9		
29	Napis Tortungpanich	Thailand	103.3	104.3	104.2	101.6	102.9	104.6	620.9		
30	Cao Yifei	China	102.6	104.6	103.6	104.5	103.5	102.0	620.8		
31	Dane Sampson	Australia	103.3	102.3	103.3	103.9	104.0	103.8	620.6		
32	Serhiy Kulish	Ukraine	104.9	101.6	104.3	102.0	103.5	104.2	620.5		
33	Filip Nepejchal	Czech Republic	102.9	103.0	104.3	102.5	104.5	103.3	620.5		
34	Milenko Sebić	Serbia	104.7	102.2	104.3	103.3	103.3	102.6	620.4		
35	Warren Potent	Australia	104.5	103.4	104.2	104.1	104.1	99.7	620.0		
36	Chain Singh	India	104.1	101.0	104.4	102.4	103.9	103.8	619.6		
37	Daniel Brodmeier	Germany	103.2	102.3	104.0	103.4	104.0	102.3	619.2		
38	Zhao Shengbo	China	101.9	100.6	105.3	105.6	103.3	102.0	618.7		
39	Jérémy Monnier	France	103.1	102.2	103.9	102.0	103.1	104.3	618.6		
40	David Higgins	United States	102.0	103.3	104.4	101.7	103.8	102.5	617.7		
41	Toshikazu Yamashita	Japan	102.6	102.5	102.8	103.1	103.7	102.7	617.4		
42	Norbert Szabián	Hungary	103.5	103.9	102.7	101.7	103.5	102.0	617.3		
43	Ole Kristian Bryhn	Norway	102.6	101.9	101.7	104.5	104.4	101.6	616.7		
44	Ahmed Darwish	Egypt	101.7	102.5	103.9	102.4	101.9	102.6	615.0		
45	Reinier Estpinan	Cuba	100.7	103.0	102.4	103.3	102.4	101.8	613.6		
46	Mahmood Haji	Bahrain	101.5	102.4	101.0	102.9	100.9	103.9	612.6		
47	Mangala Samarakoon	Sri Lanka	98.9	100.1	100.4	100.0	101.9	100.5	601.8		

== Final ==
The final was changed according to the ISSF regulations. Athletes must fire 6 shots in 2×3 series before the lowest-ranked was eliminated in every other shot.

Rk	Athlete	1	2	3	4	5	6	7	8	9	Final	Notes
1st place, gold medalist(s)	Henri Junghänel (GER)	31.4	32.0	21.5	20.7	21.3	19.9	21.2	20.4	21.1	209.5	
2nd place, silver medalist(s)	Kim Jong-hyun (KOR)	31.8	31.1	21.1	20.3	20.4	20.8	21.1	20.7	20.9	208.2	
3rd place, bronze medalist(s)	Kirill Grigoryan (RUS)	31.6	31.4	21.0	20.6	21.1	21.2	20.6	19.8		187.3	
4	Sergey Kamenskiy (RUS)	30.2	30.8	21.0	21.3	20.9	20.7	20.9			165.8	
5	Vitali Bubnovich (BLR)	30.9	30.3	21.2	20.8	20.7	20.3				144.2	
6	Marco De Nicolo (ITA)	31.1	31.0	20.4	20.6	20.5					123.6	
7	Niccolò Campriani (ITA)	30.3	30.2	21.0	21.3						102.8	
8	Attapon Uea-aree (THA)	30.9	29.1	20.8							80.8	
