= Miskolczi =

Miskolczi is a Hungarian surname.

Notable people with this surname include:

- Julianna Miskolczi (born 1983), Hungarian sports shooter
- Katalin Miskolczi (born 1976), Hungarian tennis player
- László Miskolczi (born 1986), Hungarian football player
