= Shooting at the 2015 Pan American Games – Men's 50 metre rifle three positions =

Shooting – Men's 50 metre rifle three positions at the 2015 Pan American Games
- Venue: Pan Am Shooting Centre
- Dates: July 19
- Competitors: 23 from 13 nations
- Winning score: 450.4

Medalists
Gold medal	Reinier Estpinan	Cuba
Silver medal	George Norton	United States
Bronze medal	Ryan Anderson	United States

The Men's 50 metre rifle three positions shooting event at the 2015 Pan American Games will be held on July 19 at the Pan Am Shooting Centre in Innisfil.

The event consisted of two rounds: a qualifier and a final. In the qualifier, each shooter fired 120 shots with a .22 Long Rifle at 50 metres distance. 40 shots were fired each from the standing, kneeling, and prone positions. Scores for each shot were in increments of 1, with a maximum score of 10.

The top 8 shooters in the qualifying round moved on to the final round. There, they fired an additional 10 shots, all from the standing position. These shots scored in increments of .1, with a maximum score of 10.9. The total score from all 130 shots was used to determine the final ranking.

The winners of all fifteen events, along with the runner up in the men's air rifle, skeet, trap and both women's rifle events will qualify for the 2016 Summer Olympics in Rio de Janeiro, Brazil (granted the athlete has not yet earned a quota for their country).

== Schedule ==
All times are Central Standard Time (UTC-6).

Date	Time	Round
July 19, 2015	9:15	Qualification
July 19, 2015	13:00	Final

== Results ==
=== Qualification round ===
Rank	Athlete	Country	Kneeling	Prone	Standing	Total	Notes
1	José Luis Sánchez	Mexico	391	398	381	1170-55x	Q, PR
2	Ryan Anderson	United States	387	394	386	1167-54x	Q
3	Bruno Heck	Brazil	390	396	372	1158-54x	Q
4	Luis Morales	Mexico	384	395	376	1155-42x	Q
5	George Norton	United States	372	398	384	1154-52x	Q, A2
6	Reinier Estpinan	Cuba	387	396	368	1151-46x	Q
7	Julio Iemma	Venezuela	381	389	381	1151-44x	Q
8	Cristian Santacruz	Ecuador	382	396	369	1147-43x	Q
9	Grzegorz Sych	Canada	386	395	362	1143-44x	
10	Octavio Sandoval	Guatemala	377	389	376	1142-38x	
11	Elias San Martin	Chile	383	389	369	1141-30x	
12	Alexander Molerio	Cuba	374	388	377	1139-34x	
13	Leonardo Moreira	Brazil	376	394	368	1138-40x	
14	Ángel Velarte	Argentina	377	395	364	1136-35x	
15	Pablo Álvarez	Argentina	380	390	365	1135-48x	
16	Raul Vargas	Venezuela	371	385	371	1127-29x	
17	Daniel Vizcarra	Peru	376	391	351	1118-40x	
18	Oliser Zelaya	El Salvador	375	379	364	1118-31x	
19	Israel Gutierrez	El Salvador	371	380	362	1113-29x	A2
20	Anyelo Parada	Chile	370	386	352	1108-25x	
21	Michal Dugovic	Canada	369	387	351	1107-28x	
22	Hosman Duran	Dominican Republic	369	391	327	1087-27x	
	Allan Chinchilla	Guatemala				DSQ	

=== Final ===
Rank	Athlete	Country	Kneeling	Prone	Standing	1	2	3	4	5	Total	Notes
1st place, gold medalist(s)	Reinier Estpinan	Cuba	154.3; 52.4; 50.5; 51.4	307.4; 50.7; 50.8; 51.6	401.4; 44.9; 49.1	411.4; 10.0	421.4; 10.0	431.9; 10.5	441.3; 9.4	450.4; 9.1	450.4	FPR
2nd place, silver medalist(s)	George Norton	United States	148.5; 50.9; 48.6; 49.0	299.6; 50.5; 51.5; 49.1	399.2; 49.2; 50.4	407.1; 7.9	417.0; 9.9	427.6; 10.6	437.9; 10.3	447.9; 10.0	447.9	
3rd place, bronze medalist(s)	Ryan Anderson	United States	143.7; 50.4; 47.0; 46.3	297.7; 50.6; 51.5; 52.1	397.5; 51.3; 48.3	407.6; 10.1	418.5; 10.9	427.8; 9.3	437.3; 9.5		437.3	
4	Luis Morales	Mexico	150.2; 50.1; 51.2; 48.9	303.5; 50.5; 50.8; 52.0	399.2; 48.0; 47.7	409.1; 9.9	418.0; 8.9	427.4; 9.4			427.4	
5	Bruno Heck	Brazil	150.9; 51.5; 49.0; 50.5	300.2; 49.8; 49.2; 50.3	393.9; 48.8; 44.9	404.7; 10.8	412.2; 7.5				412.2	
6	José Luis Sánchez	Mexico	148.3; 48.5; 49.5; 50.3	301.4; 51.8; 50.4; 50.9	392.0; 43.4; 47.2	402.3; 10.3					402.3	
7	Julio Iemma	Venezuela	144.3; 44.8; 49.8; 49.7	291.0; 48.1; 48.4; 50.2	385.3; 46.2; 48.1						385.3	
8	Cristian Santacruz	Ecuador	140.1; 45.8; 44.1; 50.2	289.7; 51.2; 49.1; 49.3	381.3; 43.3; 48.3						381.3	
