= Shooting at the 2016 Summer Olympics – Men's trap =

Olympic sport shooting event

Men's trap at the Games of the XXXI Olympiad
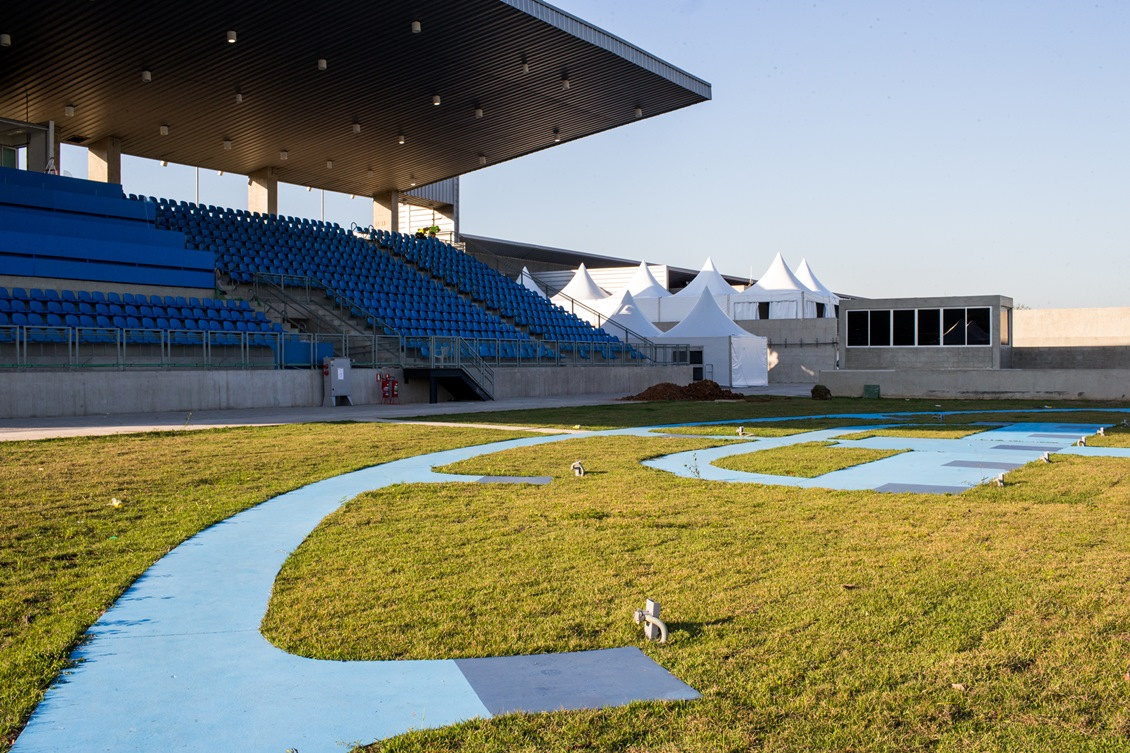
- View of the outdoor field at the National Shooting Center, where the men's trap took place.
- Venue: National Shooting Center
- Dates: 7–8 August 2016
- Competitors: 33 from 24 nations
- Winning score: 13/15 (in the gold medal match)

Medalists
1st place, gold medalist(s)		Josip Glasnović	Croatia
2nd place, silver medalist(s)		Giovanni Pellielo	Italy
3rd place, bronze medalist(s)		Edward Ling	Great Britain

The men's trap at the 2016 Summer Olympics took place on 7–8 August 2016 at the National Shooting Center. There were 33 competitors from 24 nations.

The event was won by Croatian Josip Glasnović. It was the second consecutive victory for Croatia, with Giovanni Cernogoraz taking gold in 2012 (he finished 9th this time). Italy received its fourth consecutive silver medal in the men's trap; Giovanni Pellielo was already the only man to have won three medals in the event and now became the only one to have won four. Italy's podium streak reached five Games; three times for Pellielo from 2000 to 2008 and once for Massimo Fabbrizi in 2012 before this competition. Edward Ling's bronze put Great Britain back on the podium in the event for the first time since 2000.

The medals were presented by Danka Barteková, IOC member, Slovakia and Olegario Vázquez Raña, President of the International Shooting Sport Federation.

== Background ==
This was the 22nd appearance of the men's ISSF Olympic trap event. The event was held at every Summer Olympics from 1896 to 1924 (except 1904, when no shooting events were held) and from 1952 to 2016; it was open to women from 1968 to 1992.

Two of the 6 finalists from the 2012 Games returned: gold medalist Giovanni Cernogoraz of Croatia and silver medalist Massimo Fabbrizi of Italy. Sixth-place finisher Anton Glasnović's brother, Josip, replaced him on the Croatian team. Giovanni Pellielo of Italy, a three-time medalist, also returned after an eighth-place finish in 2012 kept him out of the final. Pellielo had followed that with a 2013 World Championship, 2014 third-place finish, and 2015 second-place finish. The two-time reigning (2014 and 2015) World Champion, Erik Varga of Slovakia, was also competing in Rio de Janeiro.

Morocco made its debut in the event. Kuwaiti shooters competed as Independent Olympic Athletes. Great Britain made its 20th appearance, most among nations.

== Qualification ==
Each National Olympic Committee (NOC) could enter up to two shooters if the NOC earned enough quota sports or had enough crossover-qualified shooters. To compete, a shooter needed a quota spot and to achieve a Minimum Qualification Score (MQS). Once a shooter was using a quota spot in any shooting event, they could enter any other shooting event for which they had achieved the MQS as well (a crossover qualification). There were 32 quota spots available for the trap event: 1 for the host nation, 3 at the 2014 World Championships, 1 at the 2014 American continental championships, 8 at the 2015 World Cup events, 1 at the 2015 African championships, 3 at the 2015 European championships, 2 at the 2015 World Championships, 2 at the 2015 Pan American Games, 2 at the 2015 Oceania championships, 4 at the 2016 Asian qualifying tournament, 1 invitational place, and 4 reallocated/exchanged quota. There was also 1 cross-over spot, used by Mohamed Ramah (qualified in double trap).

== Competition format ==
The competition used a new format. The qualifying round remained the same. In the qualifier, each shooter fired 5 sets of 25 targets in trap shooting, with 10 targets being thrown to the left, 10 to the right, and 5 straight-away in each set. The shooters could take two shots at each target. Six shooters advanced.

Instead of a 6-person final round, however, the "semifinal" was introduced. The six shooters each faced 15 targets. The top two advanced to a head-to-head gold medal final, the next two went to a head-to-head bronze medal match, and the last two were ranked 5th and 6th. The finals again consisted of 15 targets. Only one shot could be taken at each target in the semifinal and finals.

Ties were broken using a shoot-off; additional shots are fired one at a time until there is no longer a tie.

== Records ==
Prior to this competition, the existing world and Olympic records were as follows.

Qualifying round
World record	Giovanni Pellielo (ITA)	125	Nicosia, Cyprus	1 April 1994
Olympic record	Michael Diamond (AUS)	125	London, United Kingdom	6 August 2012

== Schedule ==
All times are Brasilia Time (UTC-3)

Date	Time	Round
Sunday, 7 August 2016		Qualifying; Semifinal
Monday, 8 August 2016	15:30	Finals

== Results ==
=== Qualifying round ===
Rank	Shooter	Nation	1	2	3	Day 1	4	5	Total	Notes
1	Giovanni Pellielo	Italy	24	25	24	73	24	25	122	Q
2	Edward Ling	Great Britain	24	24	25	73	23	24	120	Q
3	Josip Glasnović	Croatia	25	22	25	72	25	23	120	Q
4	Ahmed Kamar	Egypt	23	23	24	70	24	25	119	Q
5	David Kostelecký	Czech Republic	23	25	24	72	23	23	118	Q
6	Massimo Fabbrizi	Italy	25	25	25	75	21	22	118	Q
7	Alexey Alipov	Russia	21	22	25	68	24	25	117	
8	Khaled Al-Mudhaf	Independent Olympic Athletes	24	24	22	70	22	25	117	
9	Giovanni Cernogoraz	Croatia	23	21	23	67	25	24	116	
10	Maxime Mottet	Belgium	23	22	23	68	24	24	116	
11	Vesa Törnroos	Finland	22	23	24	69	24	23	116	
12	Adam Vella	Australia	24	22	23	69	21	25	115	
13	Yavuz İlnam	Turkey	24	23	24	71	20	24	115	
14	Abdulrahman Al-Faihan	Independent Olympic Athletes	24	23	20	67	25	23	115	
15	Roberto Schmits	Brazil	24	24	23	71	21	23	115	
16	Manavjit Singh Sandhu	India	23	23	22	68	25	22	115	
17	Alberto Fernández	Spain	24	23	22	69	25	21	115	
18	Marián Kovačócy	Slovakia	24	21	22	67	23	24	114	
19	Kynan Chenai	India	22	23	22	67	24	23	114	
20	Eduardo Lorenzo	Dominican Republic	22	22	24	68	24	22	114	
21	Erik Varga	Slovakia	23	23	23	69	24	21	114	
22	Boštjan Maček	Slovenia	22	22	22	66	24	23	113	
23	Glenn Kable	Fiji	23	22	22	67	22	23	112	
24	Abdel-Aziz Mehelba	Egypt	23	20	23	66	24	22	112	
25	Yang Kun-pi	Chinese Taipei	23	21	20	64	22	24	110	
26	Mitchell Iles	Australia	20	23	22	65	22	23	110	
27	Danilo Caro	Colombia	25	21	21	67	21	22	110	
28	Francisco Boza	Peru	22	20	20	62	24	23	109	
29	Erdinç Kebapçı	Turkey	24	18	24	66	22	20	108	
30	Mohamed Ramah	Morocco	22	18	24	64	21	21	106	
31	Fernando Borello	Argentina	21	22	18	61	21	23	105	
32	Stefano Selva	San Marino	23	20	14	57	22	23	102	
33	João Paulo de Silva	Angola	21	18	22	61	18	19	98	

=== Semifinal ===
Rank	Shooter	Nation	Total	Shoot-off	Notes
1	Josip Glasnović	Croatia	15	—	Q
2	Giovanni Pellielo	Italy	14	—	Q
3	David Kostelecký	Czech Republic	13	—	B
4	Edward Ling	Great Britain	12	3	B
5	Ahmed Kamar	Egypt	12	2	
6	Massimo Fabbrizi	Italy	11	—	

=== Finals ===
==== Bronze medal match ====
Rank	Shooter	Nation	Total
3rd place, bronze medalist(s)	Edward Ling	Great Britain	13
4	David Kostelecký	Czech Republic	9

==== Gold medal match ====
Rank	Shooter	Nation	Total	Shoot-off
1st place, gold medalist(s)	Josip Glasnović	Croatia	13	4
2nd place, silver medalist(s)	Giovanni Pellielo	Italy	13	3
