= Shooting at the 2016 Summer Olympics – Women's 50 metre rifle three positions =

Women's 50 metre rifle three positions at the Games of the XXXI Olympiad
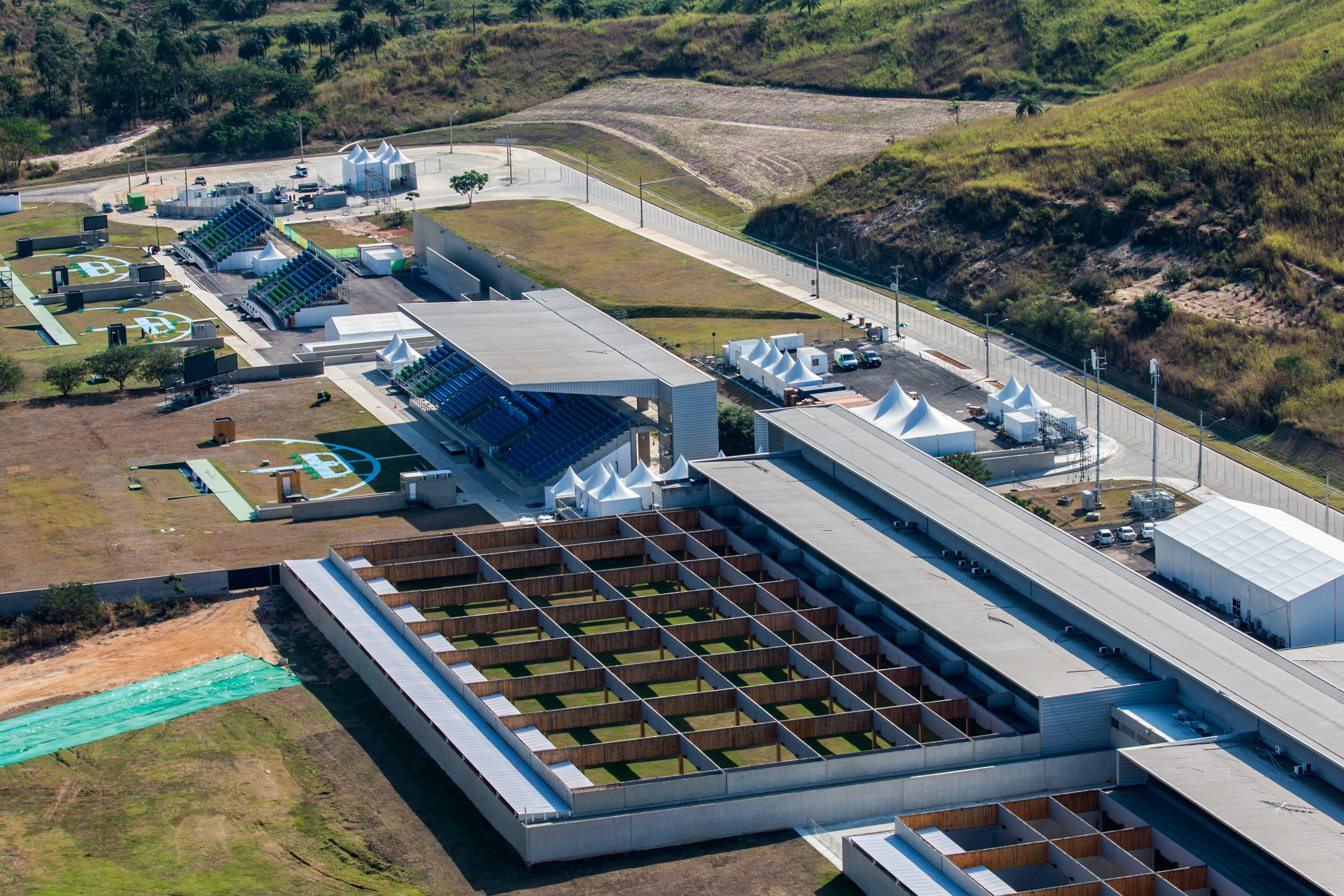
- Aerial view of the National Shooting Center in Deodoro, where the women's 50 metre rifle three positions event took place.
- Venue: National Shooting Center
- Date: 11 August 2016
- Competitors: 37 from 27 nations
- Winning score: 458.6 OR

Medalists
1st place, gold medalist(s)		Barbara Engleder	Germany
2nd place, silver medalist(s)		Zhang Binbin	China
3rd place, bronze medalist(s)		Du Li	China

The Women's 50 metre rifle three positions event at the 2016 Olympic Games took place on 11 August 2016 at the National Shooting Center.

The event consisted of two rounds: a qualifier and a final. In the qualifier, each shooter fired 60 shots with a .22 Long Rifle at 50 metres distance. 20 shots were fired each from the standing, kneeling, and prone positions. Scores for each shot were in increments of 1, with a maximum score of 10.

The top 8 shooters in the qualifying round moved on to the final round. There, they fired an additional 45 shots, 15 from each position. These shots scored in increments of .1, with a maximum score of 10.9. Eliminations occurred beginning after the 40th shot.

== Records ==
Prior to this competition, the existing world and Olympic records were as follows.

Qualification records
World record	Snježana Pejčić (CRO)	594	Rio de Janeiro, Brazil	22 April 2016
Olympic record	ISSF Rule changed on January 1, 2013	—	—	—

Final records
World record	Petra Zublasing (ITA)	464.7	Baku, Azerbaijan	19 June 2015
Olympic record	ISSF Rule changed on January 1, 2013	—	—	—

== Qualification round ==
Rank	Athlete	Country	1	2	KN	3	4	PR	5	6	ST	Total	Inner 10s	Shoot Off	Notes
1	Petra Zublasing	Italy	99	100	199	100	97	197	97	96	193	589			Q, OR
2	Nina Christen	Switzerland	97	98	195	98	98	196	97	98	195	586			Q
3	Olivia Hofmann	Austria	100	99	199	99	99	198	94	95	189	586			Q
4	Du Li	China	99	97	196	100	99	199	95	96	191	586			Q
5	Barbara Engleder	Germany	95	100	195	99	96	195	96	97	193	583			Q
6	Najmeh Khedmati	Iran	99	96	195	99	97	196	99	93	192	583			Q
7	Zhang Binbin	China	98	96	194	98	99	197	96	95	191	582			Q
8	Adéla Bruns	Czech Republic	98	98	196	100	98	198	93	95	188	582			Q
9	Gankhuyagiin Nandinzayaa	Mongolia	95	99	194	98	96	194	97	97	194	582			
10	Eglis Yaima Cruz	Cuba	98	97	195	98	100	198	96	92	188	581			
11	Virginia Thrasher	United States	94	99	193	100	99	199	94	95	189	581			
12	Snježana Pejčić	Croatia	96	98	194	100	99	199	94	93	187	580			
13	Stine Nielsen	Denmark	95	95	190	100	98	198	95	96	191	579			
14	Eva Rösken	Germany	98	95	193	100	96	196	95	95	190	579			
15	Daria Vdovina	Russia	97	98	195	99	98	197	95	92	187	579			
16	Agnieszka Nagay	Poland	98	96	194	98	96	194	95	95	190	578			
17	Malin Westerheim	Norway	99	99	198	97	98	195	93	92	185	578			
18	Jennifer McIntosh	Great Britain	98	96	194	99	96	195	94	95	189	578			
19	Ivana Maksimović	Serbia	96	96	192	98	99	197	93	96	189	578			
20	Laurence Brize	France	99	95	194	96	98	194	93	96	189	577			
21	Natallia Kalnysh	Ukraine	97	97	194	99	98	197	91	95	186	577			
22	Julianna Miskolczi	Hungary	98	95	193	99	96	195	93	96	189	577			
23	Sylwia Bogacka	Poland	98	93	191	100	99	199	94	93	187	577			
24	Yarimar Mercado	Puerto Rico	96	99	195	99	98	197	91	93	184	576			
25	Nikola Mazurová	Czech Republic	97	96	193	98	98	196	94	92	186	575			
26	Yelizaveta Korol	Kazakhstan	94	99	193	99	99	198	91	93	184	575			
27	Mahlagha Jambozorg	Iran	96	98	194	99	98	197	95	88	183	574			
28	Andrea Arsović	Serbia	96	97	193	96	98	194	91	95	186	573			
29	Tanja Perec	Croatia	94	94	188	99	99	198	91	95	186	572			
30	Živa Dvoršak	Slovenia	98	98	196	96	95	191	93	92	185	572			
31	Amelia Fournel	Argentina	95	96	191	95	97	192	93	95	188	571			
32	Lee Kye-rim	South Korea	97	95	192	97	98	195	92	91	183	570			
33	Sarah Scherer	United States	94	97	191	98	99	197	85	97	182	570			
34	Jasmine Ser	Singapore	97	93	190	95	95	190	91	97	188	568			
35	Jang Geum-young	South Korea	91	97	188	99	99	198	91	91	182	568			
36	Dianelys Pérez	Cuba	93	93	186	97	94	191	98	93	191	568			
37	Rosane Ewald	Brazil	89	82	171	98	96	194	90	95	185	550			

== Final ==
Rank	Athlete	1-5	6-10	11-15	16-20	21-25	26-30	31-35	36-40	41	42	43	44	45	Final	Notes
1st place, gold medalist(s)	Barbara Engleder (GER)	52.0	50.5	50.7	52.6	52.2	52.2	47.3	51.3	10.5	10.2	10.2	9.9	9.0	458.6	OR
2nd place, silver medalist(s)	Zhang Binbin (CHN)	51.1	51.5	49.6	52.3	51.0	51.1	50.5	50.2	10.2	10.3	10.6	9.6	10.4	458.4	
3rd place, bronze medalist(s)	Du Li (CHN)	49.9	50.4	52.2	53.0	52.1	50.3	50.3	50.9	9.8	9.4	10.5	8.6	—	447.4	
4	Petra Zublasing (ITA)	48.7	51.5	50.5	52.7	51.8	51.8	51.3	50.7	8.7	10.8	9.2	—		437.7	
5	Olivia Hofmann (AUT)	52.5	51.6	49.7	51.3	52.3	52.0	48.6	47.5	9.5	9.5	—			424.5	
6	Nina Christen (SUI)	50.6	52.1	51.2	50.8	51.1	51.9	48.9	49.0	9.2	—				414.8	
7	Adéla Bruns (CZE)	45.6	49.8	50.8	52.8	51.8	52.7	50.3	50.5	—					404.3	
8	Najmeh Khedmati (IRI)	48.9	50.5	50.9	50.5	51.1	51.7	48.8	49.9	—					402.3	
