= Shooting at the 2016 Summer Olympics – Men's 10 metre air rifle =

Men's 10 metre air rifle at the Games of the XXXI Olympiad
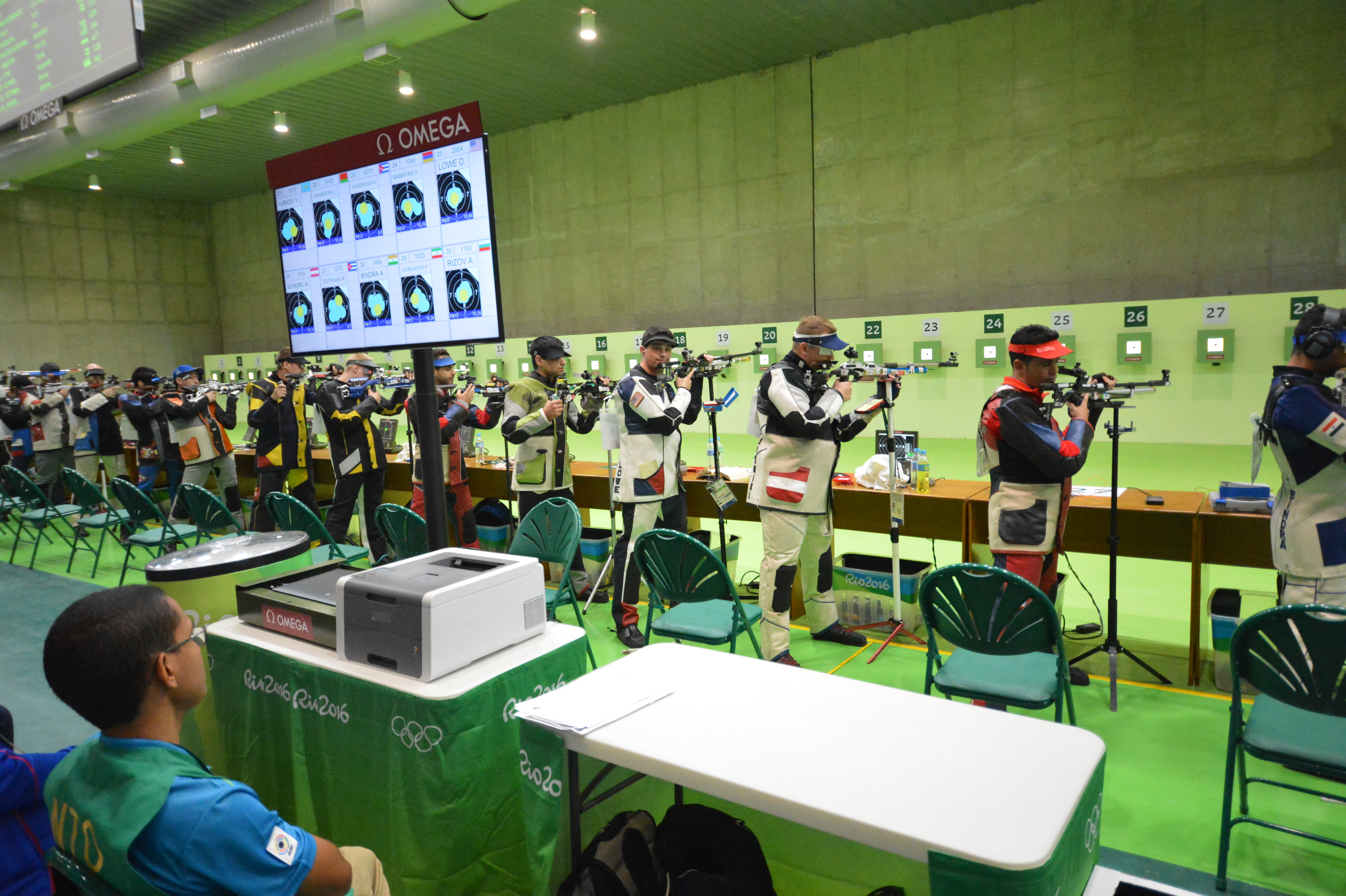
- Competitors stand at the firing range at the National Shooting Center, during the men's 10 metre air rifle
- Venue: National Shooting Center
- Date: 8 August 2016
- Winning score: 206.1 OR

Medalists
1st place, gold medalist(s)		Niccolò Campriani	Italy
2nd place, silver medalist(s)		Serhiy Kulish	Ukraine
3rd place, bronze medalist(s)		Vladimir Maslennikov	Russia

The men's 10 metre air rifle event at the 2016 Olympic Games took place on 8 August 2016.

The event consisted of two rounds: a qualifier and a final. In the qualifier, each shooter fired 60 shots with an air rifle at 10 metres' distance from the standing position. Scores for each shot were in increments of 0.1, with a maximum score of 10.9.

The top 8 shooters in the qualifying round moved on to the final round. There, they fired an additional 20 shots. These shots scored in increments of one point, with an additional point in the center ring that is scored in increments of 0.1. Therefore, the maximum score is 10.9 per shot. The maximum score that can be achieved during qualification is 654.0.

Niccolò Campriani of Italy won the gold medal, Ukraine's Serhiy Kulish won the silver medal while Russia's Vladimir Maslennikov won the bronze medal.

== Records ==
Prior to this competition, the existing world and Olympic records were as follows.

Qualification records
World record	Péter Sidi (HUN)	633.5	Munich, Germany	25 May 2013
Olympic record	ISSF Rule changed on 01.01.2013	–	–	–

Final records
World record	Qian Xuechao (CHN)	210.6	Munich, Germany	21 May 2016
Olympic record	ISSF Rule changed on 01.01.2013	–	–	–

== Qualification round ==
Rank	Athlete	Country	1	2	3	4	5	6	Total	Inner 10s	Notes
1	Niccolò Campriani	Italy	104.1	105.2	104.5	105.4	105.8	105.2	630.2		Q, OR
2	Vladimir Maslennikov	Russia	105.3	103.7	105.4	105.2	103.9	105.5	629.0		Q
3	Petar Gorša	Croatia	104.7	105.0	104.8	104.7	104.7	104.1	628.0		Q
4	Serhiy Kulish	Ukraine	103.4	104.7	103.5	106.4	104.0	105.0	627.0		Q
5	Oleh Tsarkov	Ukraine	102.9	105.5	103.9	105.1	104.0	104.8	626.2		Q
6	Péter Sidi	Hungary	103.8	104.5	104.5	105.4	102.1	105.6	625.9		Q
7	Abhinav Bindra	India	104.3	104.4	105.9	103.8	102.1	105.2	625.7		Q
8	Illia Charheika	Belarus	105.2	104.5	104.9	103.2	103.1	104.6	625.5		Q
9	Cao Yifei	China	104.1	104.4	104.7	104.3	104.4	103.6	625.5		
10	Are Hansen	Norway	101.5	104.5	103.8	103.9	105.1	105.6	624.4		
11	Kim Hyeon-jun	South Korea	103.1	104.0	104.9	106.0	104.4	102.0	624.4		
12	Milutin Stefanović	Serbia	104.1	104.8	103.2	103.7	104.0	104.5	624.3		
13	István Péni	Hungary	104.5	104.5	103.1	106.0	102.0	103.9	624.0		
14	Sergey Richter	Israel	103.8	102.4	105.1	103.7	104.7	104.1	623.8		
15	Alexander Schmirl	Austria	104.5	104.9	104.1	104.1	103.8	102.3	623.7		
16	Sergey Kamenskiy	Russia	103.7	104.2	104.5	104.0	104.4	102.4	623.2		
17	Vitali Bubnovich	Belarus	101.9	104.2	102.6	103.9	106.1	104.2	622.9		
18	Julian Justus	Germany	103.1	104.5	103.8	103.3	103.4	104.7	622.8		
19	Alin Moldoveanu	Romania	102.3	103.3	104.6	104.1	105.0	103.4	622.7		
20	Naoya Okada	Japan	104.7	105.2	100.7	104.0	103.8	104.2	622.6		
21	Lucas Kozeniesky	United States	104.1	103.9	103.3	104.1	103.3	103.6	622.3		
22	Pouria Norouzian	Iran	102.8	103.5	104.1	103.6	103.9	104.3	622.2		
23	Gagan Narang	India	105.3	104.5	102.1	103.4	101.6	104.8	621.7		
24	Hrachik Babayan	Armenia	103.7	102.1	104.0	105.5	104.3	101.9	621.5		
25	Abdullah Hel Baki	Bangladesh	103.8	104.0	105.4	103.6	100.6	103.8	621.2		
26	Valérian Sauveplane	France	102.6	104.2	104.2	102.4	103.6	104.1	621.1		
27	Jorge Díaz	Spain	103.3	102.4	103.2	104.3	104.3	103.4	620.9		
28	Vadim Skorovarov	Uzbekistan	102.9	102.6	105.3	102.4	104.5	103.2	620.9		
29	Michael Janker	Germany	101.0	103.7	104.5	104.4	104.0	103.2	620.8		
30	Marco De Nicolo	Italy	105.0	103.0	102.9	102.9	102.1	104.6	620.5		
31	Yang Haoran	China	101.6	103.3	103.9	104.0	103.9	103.8	620.5		
32	Gernot Rumpler	Austria	103.7	102.6	101.2	104.6	103.8	104.5	620.4		
33	Milenko Sebić	Serbia	102.7	104.3	104.6	103.3	101.5	103.6	620.0		
34	Daniel Lowe	United States	102.5	105.0	104.0	104.4	102.0	102.1	620.0		
35	Filip Nepejchal	Czech Republic	104.0	104.9	104.3	103.1	101.4	102.2	619.9		
36	Toshikazu Yamashita	Japan	103.8	104.6	102.7	104.7	100.1	103.6	619.5		
37	Dane Sampson	Australia	101.2	103.9	103.4	103.1	104.2	103.5	619.3		
38	Jérémy Monnier	France	103.5	103.5	102.7	102.0	103.3	103.5	618.5		
39	Hamada Talat	Egypt	102.4	103.7	102.7	103.4	103.0	103.0	618.2		
40	Ole-Kristian Bryhn	Norway	103.1	103.3	103.4	102.9	103.0	102.2	617.9		
41	Napis Tortungpanich	Thailand	103.7	102.0	102.0	103.3	104.4	102.0	617.4		
42	Anton Rizov	Bulgaria	103.0	102.0	103.9	102.2	101.3	104.9	617.3		
43	Jung Ji-geun	South Korea	104.3	104.2	102.8	97.2	104.4	103.8	616.7		
44	Yuriy Yurkov	Kazakhstan	101.3	102.4	104.1	101.6	102.9	103.0	615.3		
45	Julio Iemma	Venezuela	101.7	102.5	101.3	99.9	104.2	103.1	612.7		
46	Jack Rossiter	Australia	100.2	99.9	103.1	102.4	103.8	103.0	612.4		
47	Chafik Bouaoud	Algeria	100.4	101.2	103.0	101.6	104.2	101.7	612.1		
48	Reinier Estpinan	Cuba	101.9	101.2	100.6	102.4	101.2	102.7	610.0		
49	Alexander Molerio	Cuba	99.2	101.3	102.6	99.2	101.8	103.1	607.2		
50	Mangala Samarakoon	Sri Lanka	97.1	100.9	97.7	99.1	98.1	96.7	589.6		

== Final ==
The final was shot according to the ISSF regulations. The athletes shot 6 shots in 2×3 series before the lowest-ranked was eliminated every other shot.

Rk	Athlete	1	2	3	4	5	6	7	8	9	Final	Notes
1st place, gold medalist(s)	Niccolò Campriani; Italy	30.3	31.0	20.7	20.7	20.0	20.8	21.0	20.3	21.3	206.1	OR
2nd place, silver medalist(s)	Serhiy Kulish; Ukraine	30.8	30.0	21.3	21.0	21.2	19.6	19.9	20.6	20.2	204.6	
3rd place, bronze medalist(s)	Vladimir Maslennikov; Russia	29.9	31.7	20.4	20.9	20.7	20.5	20.0	20.1	—	184.2	
4	Abhinav Bindra; India	29.9	30.2	21.1	21.5	20.8	20.2	20.1	—		163.8	
5	Péter Sidi; Hungary	30.8	30.9	18.8	20.9	20.7	20.6	—			142.7	
6	Illia Charheika; Belarus	29.6	30.8	20.2	20.5	20.5	—				121.6	
7	Petar Gorša; Croatia	30.3	30.7	19.7	20.3	—					101.0	
8	Oleh Tsarkov; Ukraine	27.5	32.0	20.2	—						79.7	
