= Kirill Grigoryan =

Russian sport shooter (born 1992)

Personal information
- Nationality: Russian
- Born: 2 April 1992 (age 34) Saint Peterburg, Russia
- Height: 1.79 m (5 ft 10 in)
- Weight: 88 kg (194 lb)

Sport
- Country: Russia
- Sport: Shooting
Medal record
Olympic Games
| Bronze medal – third place | 2016 Rio de Janeiro | 50 m rifle prone |
European Games
| Bronze medal – third place | 2019 Minsk | 50 metre rifle prone mixed |

Kirill Akopovich Grigoryan (Russian: Кирилл Акопович Григорьян; born 2 April 1992) is a Russian shooter. He represented his country at the 2016 Summer Olympics, where he won the bronze medal in the 50 metre rifle prone event.
