= Maxime Mottet =

Belgian sport shooter (born 1991)

Maxime Mottet (born 17 May 1991) is a Belgian trap shooter. He competed in the Men's trap competition at the 2016 Summer Olympics on 7 and 8 August 2016.

== Biography ==
Maxime Mottet was born in Libramont and started shooting when he was 15. At the 2008 Junior European Championships, he won the silver medal. He won the bronze medal at the 2015 World Shotgun Championships.

== Olympic qualification ==
By finishing third at the 2015 World Championships, Mottet had secured a qualification spot for Belgium at the Rio Olympics. However, with this spot not being nominative, the Belgian Shooting Federation had to choose which candidate they thought the best to represent the country there. The final choice was between Mottet and Yannick Peeters (son of former Belgian Olympic shooter Frans Peeters, and Mottet was chosen in June 2016.

== Olympic Games ==
At the Rio Olympics, he ended 10th. After the first day of qualifications, he was placed 16th of the 33 competitors. He climbed 6 positions on the second day, ending with 116 points (for a maximum of 125). Only the first 6 shooters qualified for the semi-finals; the 6th scored 118 points in the qualifications.
