= Akiko Sato =

Japanese sports shooter

Personal information
- Born: 9 February 1984 (age 42)

Sport
- Sport: Sports shooting

Akiko Sato (佐藤 明子, Satō Akiko; born 9 February 1984) is a Japanese sports shooter. She competed in the women's 10 metre air pistol event at the 2016 Summer Olympics.
