= Zhao Shengbo =

Chinese sports shooter (born 1982)

Personal information
- Born: 14 April 1982 (age 44)
- Height: 175 cm (5 ft 9 in)
- Weight: 81 kg (179 lb)

Sport
- Sport: Sports shooting
Medal record
Men's shooting
Representing China
Asian Championships
Silver medal – second place	2015 Kuwait City	50 m rifle prone team

Zhao Shengbo (Simplified Chinese:赵 声波, born 14 April 1982) is a Chinese sports shooter from Zhaotong. He competed in the men's 50 metre rifle prone event at the 2016 Summer Olympics.
