= Chafik Bouaoud =

Algerian sports shooter

Personal information
- Born: 12 February 1999 (age 27)

Sport
- Sport: Sports shooting

Chafik Bouaoud (born 12 February 1999) is an Algerian sports shooter. He competed in the men's 10 metre air rifle event at the 2016 Summer Olympics.
