= Valentina Gustin =

Croatian sports shooter

Personal information
- Born: 20 November 1996 (age 29)

Sport
- Sport: Sports shooting
Medal record
Women's Shooting
Representing Croatia
European Championships
Silver medal – second place	2017 Maribor	Team 10 m air rifle

Valentina Gustin (born 20 November 1996) is a Croatian sports shooter. She competed in the women's 10 metre air rifle event at the 2016 Summer Olympics.
