= Daniel Lowe =

American sports shooter

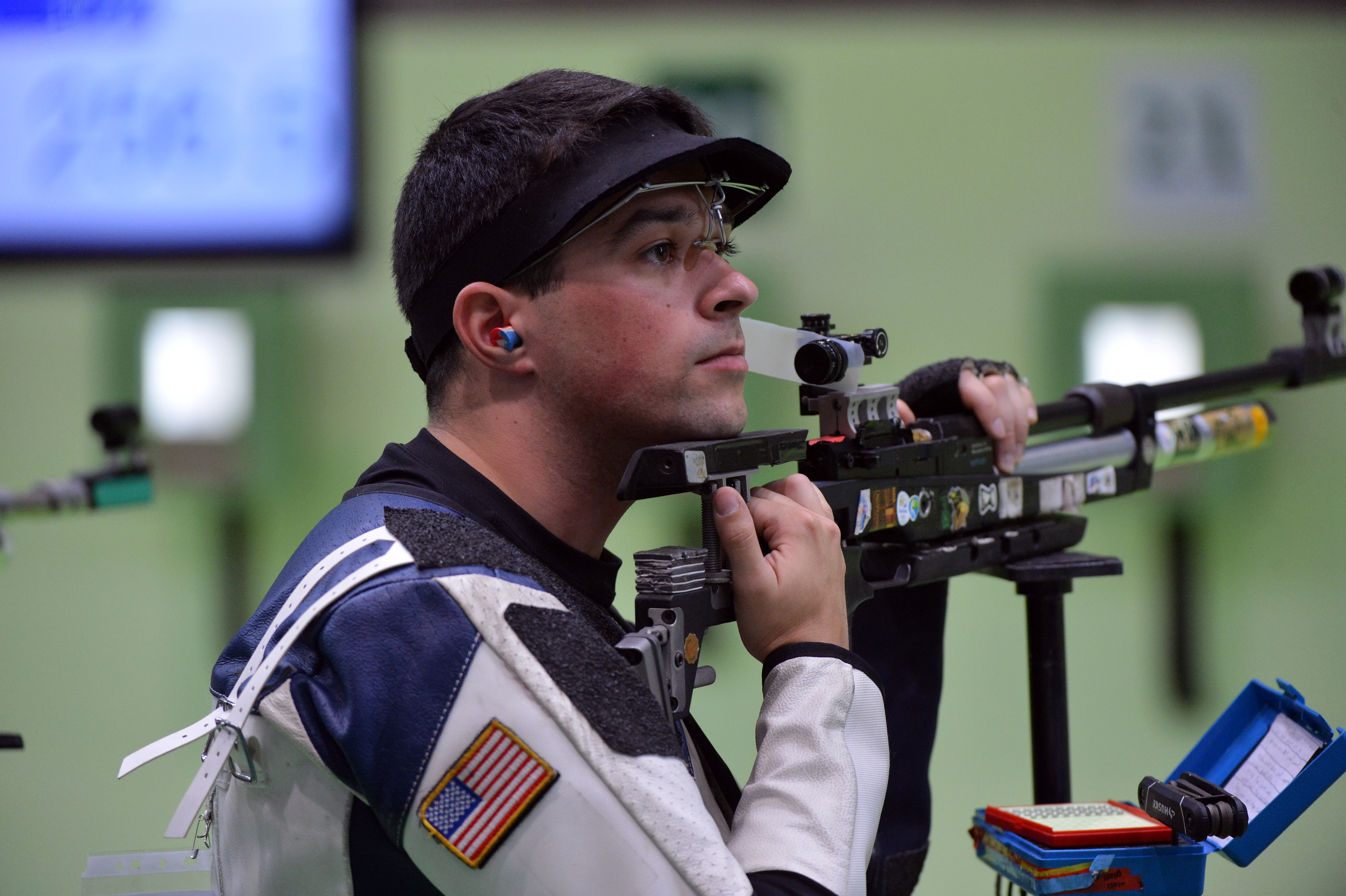
- Daniel Lowe at the Rio Olympic Games 10-meter air rifle event

Personal information
- Born: November 18, 1992 (age 33)

Sport
- Sport: Sports shooting

Daniel Lowe (born November 18, 1992) is an American sports shooter. He competed in the men's 10 metre air rifle and 50 metre rifle three positions events at the 2016 Summer Olympics.
