= Mahmood Haji =

Bahraini sports shooter

Personal information
- Born: 11 March 1991 (age 35)

Sport
- Sport: Sports shooting
Medal record
Men's shooting
Representing Bahrain
Asian Airgun Championships
Bronze medal – third place	2021 Shymkent	10 m air rifle

Mahmood Haji (born 11 March 1991) is a Bahraini sports shooter. He competed in the men's 50 metre rifle prone event at the 2016 Summer Olympics.
