= Jay Shi =

American sports shooter

Personal information
- Born: February 23, 1979 (age 47) Tianjin, China
- Home town: Phoenix, Arizona, United States

Sport
- Sport: Sports shooting
Medal record
Representing United States
Pan American Games
Silver medal – second place	2015 Toronto	10m air pistol

Jay Shi (born February 23, 1979) is an American sports shooter. He competed in the men's 10 metre air pistol event at the 2016 Summer Olympics.

Shi, a descendant of the Shi family in Tianjin, emigrated to the United States with his family to receive medical care for an eye injury he sustained at the age of eleven
