= Will Brown (sport shooter) =

American sportsperson

Personal information
- Born: December 31, 1991 (age 34) Twin Falls, Idaho, United States

Sport
- Sport: Sports shooting

Will Brown (born December 31, 1991) is an American sports shooter. He competed in the men's 10 metre air pistol event at the 2016 Summer Olympics.
