= Samy Abdel Razek =

Egyptian sport shooter

Personal information
- Nationality: Egypt
- Born: 10 April 1980 (age 46)

Sport
- Sport: Shooting
- Event(s): 10 m air pistol (AP60); 50 m pistol (FP)

Samy Abdel Razek (Arabic: سامي عبد الرازق; born 10 April 1980) is an Egyptian sport shooter. Abdel Razek represented Egypt at the 2008 Summer Olympics in Beijing, where he competed in the men's 50 m pistol. He finished only in thirty-second place by four points ahead of Portugal's João Costa from the final attempt, for a total score of 549 targets.

He competed at the 2020 Summer Olympics in the men's 10 m air pistol event and the 10 m air pistol mixed team event.
