= Stefano Selva =

Sammarinese sport shooter

Stefano Selva (born August 24, 1969) is a Sammarinese sport shooter. He placed 32nd in the men's trap event at the 2016 Summer Olympics.
