= Lee Kye-rim =

South Korean sports shooter (born 1990)

Personal information
- Born: 31 August 1990 (age 35)

Korean name
- Hangul: 이계림
- RR: I Gyerim
- MR: I Kyerim

Sport
- Sport: Sports shooting
Medal record
Women's shooting
Representing South Korea
Asian Games
Gold medal – first place	2025 Cairo	50 m rifle prone team
Bronze medal – third place	2022 Hangzhou	50 m rifle 3 positions team

Lee Kye-rim (Korean: 이계림; born 31 August 1990) is a South Korean sports shooter. She competed in the women's 50 metre rifle three positions event at the 2016 Summer Olympics.
