= Lydia Paterson =

American sport shooter

Personal information
- Nationality: American
- Born: October 17, 1996 (age 28)
- Height: 1.63 m (5 ft 4 in)
- Weight: 69 kg (152 lb)

Sport
- Country: United States of America
- Sport: Shooting

Lydia Paterson (born October 17, 1996) is an American shooter. She represented her country at the 2016 Summer Olympics in Rio de Janeiro.
