= Vesa Törnroos =

Finnish sports shooter (1982–2020)

Personal information
- Born: 2 September 1982; Pertunmaa, Finland
- Died: 15 April 2020 (aged 37); Pertunmaa, Finland

Sport
- Sport: Sports shooting

Vesa Petteri Törnroos (2 September 1982 – 15 April 2020) was a Finnish sports shooter. He competed in the men's trap event at the 2016 Summer Olympics, ranking 11th.

He died of cancer at the age of 37.
