= Marija Marović =

Croatian sports shooter

Personal information
- Born: 16 September 1983 (age 42)

Sport
- Sport: Sports shooting

Marija Marović (born 16 September 1983) is a Croatian sports shooter. She competed in the women's 10 metre air pistol event at the 2016 Summer Olympics.
