= Hamada Talat =

Egyptian sports shooter

Personal information
- Born: 1 March 1981 (age 45)

Sport
- Sport: Sports shooting

Hamada Talat (born 1 March 1981) is an Egyptian sports shooter. He competed in the men's 10 metre air rifle event at the 2016 Summer Olympics.
