= Jérémy Monnier =

French sports shooter

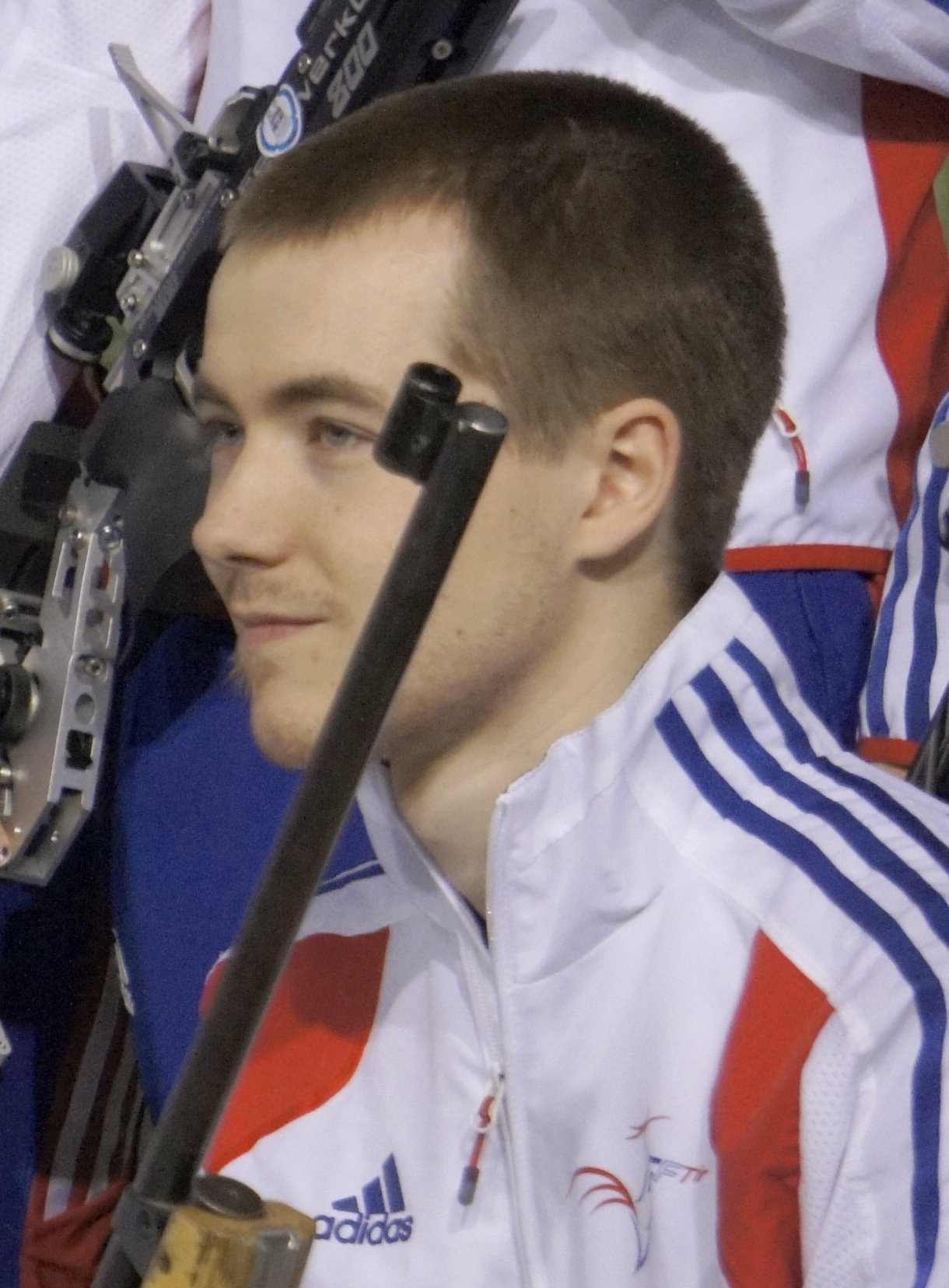
- Monnier in 2013

Personal information
- Nationality: French
- Born: 5 May 1989 (age 37) Pontarlier, France
- Height: 175 cm (5 ft 9 in)
- Weight: 65 kg (143 lb)

Sport
- Sport: Sports shooting
- Club: Societe de Tir Pontarlier
- Coached by: Pascal Bessy (national); Eric Viller (national)

Jérémy Monnier (born 5 May 1989) is a French sports shooter. He placed 26th in the 10 metre air rifle event at the 2012 Summer Olympics. At the 2016 Rio Games he finished 39th and 38th in the 50 m rifle prone and 10 m air rifle events respectively.

Monnier took up shooting in 1997, and in 2004 was included to the national team.
