= Roberto Schmits =

Brazilian sports shooter

Personal information
- Born: 4 February 1969 (age 57) Novo Hamburgo, Brazil

Sport
- Sport: Sports shooting
Medal record
Men's shooting
Representing Brazil
Pan American Games
Bronze medal – third place	2011 Guadalajara	Trap
Bronze medal – third place	2019 Lima	Trap

Roberto Schmits (born 4 February 1969) is a Brazilian sports shooter. He competed in the men's trap event at the 2016 Summer Olympics.
