= Han Seung-woo (sport shooter) =

South Korean sport shooter

Personal information
- Nationality: South Korean
- Born: 3 July 1983 (age 42) Daegu, South Korea
- Height: 1.73 m (5 ft 8 in)
- Weight: 82 kg (181 lb)

Korean name
- Hangul: 한승우
- RR: Han Seungu
- MR: Han Sŭngu

Sport
- Country: South Korea
- Sport: Shooting
- Event: Air pistol
Medal record
World Championships
Gold medal – first place	2018 Changwon	50 m team pistol
Gold medal – first place	2018 Changwon	10 m team air pistol
Silver medal – second place	2023 Baku	50 m pistol team

Seungwoo Han (born 3 July 1983) is a South Korean shooter. He represented his country at the 2016 Summer Olympics.

Han attended Kyungnam University. While a student, he represented South Korea in the junior division at the 2002 ISSF World Shooting Championships, where he and teammates Park Ji-su and Park Jin-gu won South Korea's first gold medal in the junior men's 10m team air pistol event.
