= Ahmed Darwish (sport shooter) =

Egyptian sports shooter

Personal information
- Full name: Ahmed Murad Darwish
- Born: 2 June 1981 (age 45)

Sport
- Sport: Sports shooting

Ahmed Darwish (born 2 June 1981) is an Egyptian sports shooter. He competed in the men's 50 metre rifle prone event at the 2016 Summer Olympics.
