= David Higgins (Mississippi politician) =

American politician

David Higgins (c. 1823 – ?) was an African American preacher and state legislator in Mississippi between 1870 and 1872. He was a Republican.

== Biography ==
Higgins was born around 1823 in South Carolina and was African American. He worked as a preacher. In the 1880 census, he is recorded as being married to a woman named Maria and having sons.

He represented Oktibbeha County in the Mississippi House of Representatives from 1870 to 1872. He was elected alongside George H. Holland, both of them members of the Mississippi Republican Party. Higgins received 1,581 votes. In 1873, he represented Oktibbeha County at the state's Republican convention.

== See also ==
- African American officeholders from the end of the Civil War until before 1900
