= Jang Geum-young =

South Korean sports shooter

Personal information
- Born: 4 May 1980 (age 46)

Korean name
- Hangul: 장금영
- RR: Jang Geumyeong
- MR: Chang Kŭmyŏng

Sport
- Sport: Sports shooting

Jang Geum-young (Korean: 장금영; born 4 May 1980) is a South Korean sports shooter. She competed in the women's 50 metre rifle three positions event at the 2016 Summer Olympics.
