= Tanja Perec =

Croatian sports shooter (born 1992)

Personal information
- Born: 8 June 1992 (age 34)

Sport
- Sport: Sports shooting

Tanja Perec (born 8 June 1992) is a Croatian sports shooter. She competed in the women's 50 metre rifle three positions event at the 2016 Summer Olympics.
