= Dimitrije Grgić =

Serbian sports shooter (born 1984)

Personal information
- Nationality: Serbian
- Born: 22 June 1984 (age 42) Belgrade, Serbia, Yugoslavia
- Height: 1.91 m (6 ft 3 in)
- Weight: 85 kg (187 lb)

Sport
- Country: Serbia
- Sport: Sports shooting
- Event: Air pistol
- Club: SK Akademac
Medal record
Men's shooting
Representing Serbia
World Championships
Silver medal – second place	2018 Changwon	50 m team pistol
European Championships
Bronze medal – third place	2017 Maribor	Team pistol

Dimitrije Grgić (Serbian Cyrillic: Димитрије Гргић, born 22 June 1984) is a Serbian sports shooter. He competed in the men's 10 metre air pistol and 50 metres pistol events at the 2016 Summer Olympics. He finished ninth in the 10m air pistol event and sixteenth in the 50m pistol event.
