= Miklós Tátrai =

Hungarian sport shooter (born 1986)

Personal information
- Born: 19 September 1986 (age 39)

Sport
- Sport: Sports shooting
Medal record
Men's Shooting
Representing Hungary
European Championships
Bronze medal – third place	2024 Győr	10 m air pistol team

Miklós Tátrai (born 19 September 1986) is a Hungarian sports shooter. He competed in the men's 10 metre air pistol event at the 2016 Summer Olympics.
