= Ahmed Shaban =

Egyptian sports shooter

Personal information
- Nationality: Egypt
- Born: 8 March 1979 (age 47)

Sport
- Sport: Sports shooting

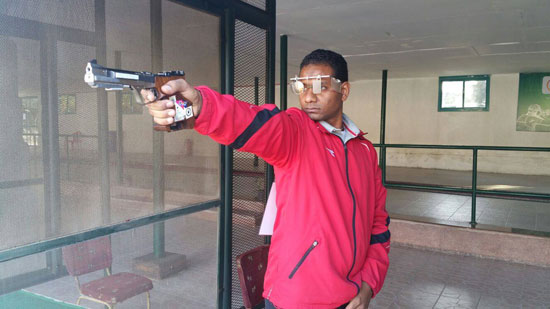
shooting RFP

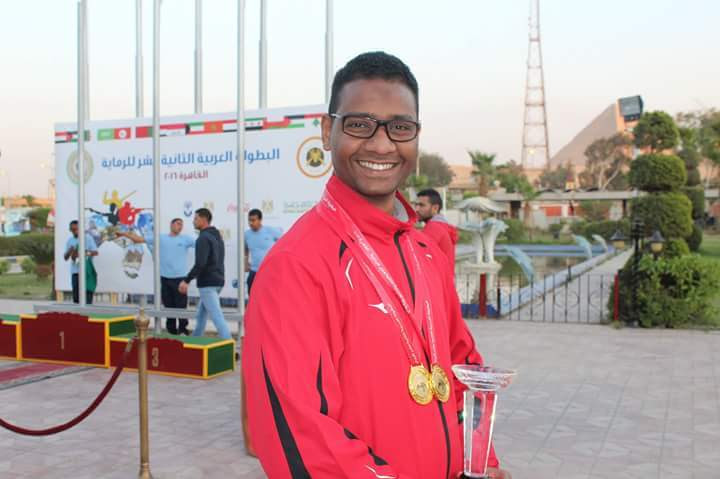
Arab champion

Ahmed Shaban (born 8 March 1979) is an Egyptian sports shooter. He competed in the men's 25 metre rapid fire pistol event at the 2016 Summer Olympics.

Ahmed Shaban (Arabic: أحمد شعبان; born March 8, 1979, in El Haram, Giza, Egypt) is an Egyptian Olympic sports shooter, international shooting coach, and the founder of the Shooting Art Academy. He represented Egypt in the 25 metre rapid fire pistol event at the 2016 Summer Olympics in Rio de Janeiro.

He is also a former officer in the Egyptian Airborne Special Forces and has over two decades of experience as a competitor, coach, and shooting range administrator. Shaban is known for his contributions to modernizing shooting education in the Arab world.

== Sporting career ==
• Competed at the 2016 Rio Summer Olympics in the 25m Rapid Fire Pistol event. • Held 1 African record and 4 Egyptian national records in pistol shooting. • Won over 100 medals in national and international competitions. • Represented Egypt in ISSF World Cups and regional championships between 2006 and 2021. • Traveled for training and competitions to over 12 countries including Germany, Brazil, China, Sweden, Italy, and Switzerland.

== Coaching career ==
• Founder & Head Coach, Shooting Art Academy (2024–present), offering Arabic-language shooting education via YouTube and a dedicated e-learning platform. • Trained military and civilian teams across Egypt with a focus on pistol disciplines, mental training, and performance analytics. • Vice Director, ACA Shooting Range (2021–2023) – Managed shooting programs, security, and coaching operations. • Delivered coaching that led to 4 gold and 2 silver medals won by his trainees.

== Education & Certifications ==
• ISSF Coach License C – ISSF Academy, 2025 • ISSF Coach License D – ISSF Academy, 2024 • Trainer Certification (Shooting) – Egyptian Olympic Academy, 2023 • Anti-Doping Certificate – WADA, 2024 • Psychology and Governance Courses – Emirates Sport Sciences Center, 2023 • Electronic Target Systems Training – Sius Ascor, Switzerland, 2020 • Bachelor of Military Sciences, Egyptian Military Academy (1997–2000)

== Shooting Art Academy ==
In 2024, Shaban founded the Shooting Art Academy, the first dedicated Arabic-language shooting education platform. It includes: • A YouTube channel for free public training videos. • A website offering online courses, coaching programs, and resources aligned with ISSF standards. • Aimed at supporting athletes, coaches, and shooting enthusiasts in the MENA region.

== Media Presence ==
• Frequently shares expert content on Olympic shooting techniques, ISSF rule updates, and coaching methods. • Recognized as a key figure in spreading modern shooting education in Arabic.
