= David Higgins (sport shooter) =

American sports shooter

Personal information
- Born: June 27, 1994 (age 32)

Sport
- Sport: Sports shooting

Achievements and titles
- Olympic finals: Rio de Janeiro 2016

David Higgins (born June 27, 1994) is an American sports shooter. He competed in the men's 50 metre rifle prone event at the 2016 Summer Olympics.
