= Zhang Binbin =

Chinese sport shooter

Personal information
- Nationality: Chinese
- Born: 23 February 1989 (age 37) Xiang'an District, Xiamen, Fujian
- Height: 1.64 m (5 ft 5 in)
- Weight: 55 kg (121 lb)

Sport
- Country: China
- Sport: Shooting
Medal record
Women's shooting
Representing China
Olympic Games
Silver medal – second place	2016 Rio de Janeiro	50 m rifle 3 positions
Asian Championships
Gold medal – first place	2015 Kuwait City	10 m air rifle team
Gold medal – first place	2015 Kuwait City	50 m rifle 3 positions team
Bronze medal – third place	2015 Kuwait City	50 m rifle prone team

Zhang Binbin (simplified Chinese: 张彬彬; traditional Chinese: 張彬彬; pinyin: Zhāng Bīnbīn; born 23 February 1989 in Xiang'an, Xiamen) is a Chinese shooter. She represented her country at the 2016 Summer Olympics, where she won the silver medal in the 50 metre rifle three positions event.
