= Erdinç Kebapçı =

Turkish sport shooter

Personal information
- Nationality: Turkish
- Born: 27 June 1993 (age 33) Manisa, Turkey

Sport
- Country: Turkey
- Sport: Shooting sport
- Club: Kocaeli BB Kağıt SK
Medal record
Trap shooting
Representing Turkey

Erdinç Kebapçı (born 27 June 1993) is a Turkish trap shooter. He is a member of Kocaeli BB Kağıt SK.

Kebapçı won the gold medal in the men's team trap event at the 2015 Summer Universiade in Gwangju, South Korea.

He earned a quota spot for the 2016 Summer Olympics.
