= Norbert Szabián =

Hungarian sport shooter

Personal information
- Nationality: Hungarian
- Born: 24 September 1982 (age 43) Kecel
- Height: 1.82 m (6 ft 0 in)
- Weight: 97 kg (214 lb)

Sport
- Country: Hungary

Norbert Szabián (born 24 September 1982) is a Hungarian Olympic shooter. He represented his country at the 2016 Summer Olympics. His result in the Rio Summer Olympics was #42 in the sport shooting event of men's Small-Bore Rifle, Prone, 50 meters competition.
