= Julio Iemma =

Venezuelan shooter (born 1984)

Personal information
- Born: 31 July 1984 (age 41) Buenos Aires, Argentina

Sport
- Sport: Sports shooting
- Event(s): Air rifle, prone 60 and 3 positions
Medal record
Representing Venezuela
Pan American Games
| Silver medal – second place | 2015 Toronto | 10m air rifle |

Julio César Iemma Hernández (born 31 July 1984) is a Venezuelan sports shooter. He competed in the men's 10 metre air rifle event at the 2016 Summer Olympics.
