= Julianna Miskolczi =

Hungarian sport shooter (born 1983)

Personal information
- Born: 22 November 1983 (age 41)

Sport
- Sport: Sports shooting

Julianna Miskolczi (born 22 November 1983) is a Hungarian sports shooter. She competed in the women's 10 metre air rifle event at the 2016 Summer Olympics.
