= Reinier Estpinan =

Cuban sports shooter (born 1982)

Personal information
- Full name: Reinier Estpinan Gómez
- Nationality: Cuba
- Born: 5 December 1982 (age 43) Havana, Cuba
- Height: 1.70 m (5 ft 7 in)
- Weight: 60 kg (132 lb)

Sport
- Sport: Shooting
- Event: 50 m rifle prone (FR60PR)
- Club: Ciudad de Habana
- Coached by: Alejandro Guerra
Medal record
Men's shooting
Representing Cuba
Pan American Games
Gold medal – first place	2015 Toronto	50m rifle 3 positions
Silver medal – second place	2003 Santo Domingo	50m rifle 3 positions

Reinier Estpinan Gómez (born December 5, 1982, in Havana) is a Cuban sport shooter. He earned a silver medal in the men's rifle prone at the 2003 Pan American Games in Santo Domingo, Dominican Republic, and also represented his nation Cuba at the 2004 Summer Olympics.

Estpinan reached at the summit of his sporting career at the 2003 Pan American Games in Santo Domingo, Dominican Republic, where he picked up a silver medal in the men's 50 m rifle prone with a total score of 696.5, finishing behind U.S. sport shooter Tom Tamas by almost a full point.

At the 2004 Summer Olympics in Athens, Estpinan qualified for the Cuban squad in the men's 50 m rifle prone by placing second from the Pan American Games. He scored 581 points to obtain a last spot out of forty-six shooters in the prelim stage, failing to advance further into the final.

Estpinan also sought to compete for two more editions of the Olympic Games, but finished farther from the standings to achieve a qualifying place on the Cuban team. At the 2014 Championship of the Americas Tournament (CAT) in Guadalajara, Mexico, Estpinan unleashed an astonishing target of 208.1 points to win a gold medal and secure an Olympic quota place for Cuba in men's rifle prone, hoping for his second Olympic bid after a twelve-year absence.
