= Shooting at the 2015 European Games – Women's 10 metre air rifle =

Women's 10 m air rifle at the 2015 European Games
- Venue: Baku Shooting Centre
- Date: 16 June
- Competitors: 39 from 25 nations

Medalists
| gold medal | Andrea Arsović | Serbia |
| silver medal | Sarah Hornung | Switzerland |
| bronze medal | Barbara Engleder | Germany |

The Women's 10 metre air rifle competition at the 2015 European Games in Baku, Azerbaijan was held on 16 June at the Baku Shooting Centre.

== Schedule ==
All times are local (UTC+5).

| Date | Time | Event |
|---|---|---|
| Tuesday, 16 June 2015 | 12:10 | Qualification |
| Tuesday, 16 June 2015 | 14:00 | Final |

== Results ==
=== Qualification ===
| Rank | Athlete | Series | | | | Total |
| Rank | Athlete | 1 | 2 | 3 | 4 | Total |
|---|---|---|---|---|---|---|
| 1 | Kata Zwickl-Veres (HUN) | 104.1 | 105.3 | 104.6 | 102.7 | 416.7 |
| 2 | Daria Vdovina (RUS) | 105.2 | 104.5 | 103.8 | 103.0 | 416.5 |
| 3 | Barbara Engleder (GER) | 102.9 | 105.0 | 103.6 | 104.6 | 416.1 |
| 4 | Andrea Arsović (SRB) | 104.3 | 103.7 | 101.8 | 106.1 | 415.9 |
| 5 | Snjezana Pejcic (CRO) | 104.9 | 103.1 | 103.1 | 104.7 | 415.8 |
| 6 | Ivana Maksimović (SRB) | 100.2 | 105.2 | 104.5 | 105.8 | 415.7 |
| 7 | Nikola Mazurová (CZE) | 103.9 | 104.4 | 103.2 | 104.2 | 415.7 |
| 8 | Sarah Hornung (SUI) | 104.1 | 102.9 | 104.7 | 104.0 | 415.7 |
| 9 | Jennifer McIntosh (GBR) | 102.7 | 105.6 | 103.2 | 103.5 | 415.0 |
| 10 | Stine Nielsen (DEN) | 103.5 | 104.1 | 104.8 | 102.5 | 414.9 |
| 11 | Seonaid McIntosh (GBR) | 103.4 | 103.3 | 104.7 | 102.8 | 414.2 |
| 12 | Rikke Ibsen (DEN) | 103.9 | 102.5 | 104.6 | 102.7 | 413.7 |
| 13 | Natallia Kalnysh (UKR) | 101.3 | 104.3 | 103.6 | 104.0 | 413.2 |
| 14 | Martina Pica (ITA) | 103.6 | 103.4 | 102.5 | 103.6 | 413.1 |
| 15 | Gabriela Vognarová (CZE) | 102.5 | 101.6 | 104.8 | 104.1 | 413.0 |
| 16 | Daniela Pešková (SVK) | 103.1 | 103.2 | 102.8 | 103.9 | 413.0 |
| 17 | Urška Kuharič (SLO) | 102.8 | 102.7 | 103.4 | 103.7 | 412.6 |
| 18 | Olivia Hofmann (AUT) | 103.6 | 102.1 | 103.4 | 103.5 | 412.6 |
| 19 | Judith Gomez (FRA) | 102.9 | 103.0 | 101.5 | 105.0 | 412.4 |
| 20 | Jasmin Mischler (SUI) | 102.8 | 104.7 | 102.6 | 102.3 | 412.4 |
| 21 | Agnieszka Nagay (POL) | 102.5 | 102.0 | 103.3 | 104.4 | 412.2 |
| 22 | Maša Berić (CRO) | 104.4 | 102.1 | 103.2 | 102.1 | 411.8 |
| 23 | Anna Zhukova (RUS) | 104.2 | 102.4 | 102.4 | 102.6 | 411.6 |
| 24 | Lisa Müller (GER) | 103.7 | 102.6 | 101.0 | 104.0 | 411.3 |
| 25 | Malin Westerheim (NOR) | 101.7 | 103.7 | 101.5 | 104.2 | 411.1 |
| 26 | Živa Dvoršak (SLO) | 102.2 | 102.9 | 101.3 | 104.6 | 411.0 |
| 27 | Julianna Miskolczi (HUN) | 100.7 | 103.1 | 103.6 | 103.2 | 410.6 |
| 28 | Sabrina Sena (ITA) | 103.0 | 101.4 | 102.9 | 103.2 | 410.5 |
| 29 | Stephanie Obermoser (AUT) | 102.8 | 103.0 | 101.9 | 102.8 | 410.5 |
| 30 | Olga Golubchenko (UKR) | 101.7 | 103.9 | 102.7 | 102.0 | 410.3 |
| 31 | Jana Hyblerová (SVK) | 102.4 | 102.1 | 103.0 | 102.6 | 410.1 |
| 32 | Carole Calmes (LUX) | 100.6 | 102.6 | 104.0 | 102.6 | 409.8 |
| 33 | Nina Balaban (MKD) | 101.4 | 102.3 | 102.3 | 102.2 | 408.2 |
| 34 | Anzela Voronova (EST) | 100.9 | 101.9 | 102.7 | 102.6 | 408.1 |
| 35 | Tatjana Đekanović (BIH) | 103.2 | 100.7 | 100.8 | 102.0 | 406.7 |
| 36 | Paula Wrońska (POL) | 100.5 | 100.3 | 101.7 | 103.0 | 405.5 |
| 37 | Stephanie Vercrusse (BEL) | 100.6 | 101.2 | 101.6 | 100.3 | 403.7 |
| 38 | Esther Barrugués (AND) | 102.5 | 98.9 | 96.2 | 98.5 | 396.1 |
| 39 | Urata Rama (KOS) | 96.1 | 99.3 | 97.5 | 96.2 | 389.1 |

=== Final ===
| Rank | Athlete | Series | | | | | | | | | Notes |
| Rank | Athlete | 1 | 2 | 3 | 4 | 5 | 6 | 7 | 8 | 9 | Notes |
|---|---|---|---|---|---|---|---|---|---|---|---|
| 1st place, gold medalist(s) | Andrea Arsović (SRB) | 32.2 | 63.3 | 83.6 | 104.6 | 125.5 | 146.3 | 167.4 | 187.1 | 207.8 | GR |
| 2nd place, silver medalist(s) | Sarah Hornung (SUI) | 30.9 | 62.0 | 83.0 | 104.0 | 125.3 | 145.1 | 165.4 | 186.6 | 207.7 | |
| 3rd place, bronze medalist(s) | Barbara Engleder (GER) | 31.4 | 62.6 | 82.7 | 103.8 | 124.6 | 145.6 | 166.3 | 186.0 | | |
| 4 | Snjezana Pejcic (CRO) | 30.6 | 61.8 | 82.5 | 103.6 | 125.0 | 145.7 | 164.1 | | | |
| 5 | Daria Vdovina (RUS) | 30.3 | 61.5 | 82.7 | 103.6 | 124.8 | 144.9 | | | | |
| 6 | Ivana Maksimović (SRB) | 31.2 | 62.1 | 82.6 | 103.0 | 123.1 | | | | | |
| 7 | Nikola Mazurová (CZE) | 30.4 | 60.7 | 81.2 | 101.3 | | | | | | |
| 8 | Kata Zwickl-Veres (HUN) | 29.7 | 60.0 | 80.4 | | | | | | | |
