= 2017 in shooting =

This article lists the main target shooting events and their results for 2017.

== World events ==
=== International Shooting Sport Federation ===
- August 30 – September 11: 2017 ISSF Junior World Championships held in Suhl and Moscow.
- August 30 – September 11: 2017 World Shotgun Championships held in Moscow, Russia

==== ISSF World Cup ====
- 2017 ISSF World Cup
- 2017 ISSF Junior World Cup

=== International Confederation of Fullbore Rifle Associations ===
2017 ICFRA World F-Class Championships - Connaught, Canada
Event	Gold	Silver	Bronze
F-Open Team (Farquharson Trophy)	Australia	Canada	United States
F-Open Individual	R Davies (AUS)	P Sandie (GBR)	A Pohl (AUS)
F-TR Team (Richardson Cup)	United States	Australia	South Africa
F-TR Individual	D Rodgers (USA)	K Chou (CAN)	B Litz (USA)

=== International Practical Shooting Confederation ===
- June 4–11: 2017 IPSC Rifle World Shoot in Kubinka, Russia
- August 27 – September 3: 2017 IPSC Handgun World Shoot at the Centre National de Tir in Châteauroux, France

=== FITASC ===
2017 Results

=== Commonwealth Shooting Championships ===
- October 28 – November 8: 2017 Commonwealth Shooting Championships at the Belmont Shooting Complex in Brisbane, Australia. This was a test event ahead of the Shooting at the 2018 Commonwealth Games.

=== Island Games ===
- June 24–30: Shooting at the 2017 Island Games in Gotland, Sweden

=== 2017 Islamic Solidarity Games ===
- May 13–17: Shooting at the 2017 Islamic Solidarity Games in Baku, Azerbaijan

== Regional Events ==
=== Asia ===
==== Asian Shooting Championships ====
- December 6–12: 2017 Asian Airgun Championships in Wakō, Saitama, Japan
- August 3–14: 2017 Asian Shotgun Championships in Astana Kazakhstan

==== Southeast Asian Games ====
- August 21–26: Shooting at the 2017 Southeast Asian Games in Subang, Malaysia

=== Europe ===
==== European Shooting Confederation ====
- March 6–12: 2017 European 10 m Events Championships in Maribor, Slovenia
- July 21 – August 4: 2017 European Shooting Championships in Baku, Azerbaijan

==== 2017 Games of the Small States of Europe ====
- May 30 – June 2: Shooting at the 2017 Games of the Small States of Europe held in San Marino

==== "B Matches" ====
- February 2–4: InterShoot in Den Haag, Netherlands
- December 13–16: RIAC held in Strassen, Luxembourg

== National Events ==
=== United Kingdom ===
==== NRA Imperial Meeting ====
- July, held at the National Shooting Centre, Bisley
  - Queen's Prize winner: Parag Patel (GBR)
  - Grand Aggregate winner: CJ Watson
  - Ashburton Shield winners: Wellington College, Berkshire
  - Kolapore Winners: Great Britain (GBR)
  - National Trophy Winners: England (ENG)
  - Elcho Shield winners: England (ENG)
  - Vizianagram winners: House of Commons

==== NSRA National Meeting ====
- August, held at the National Shooting Centre, Bisley
  - Earl Roberts British Prone Champion: Lina Jones (GBR)

=== USA ===
- 2017 NCAA Rifle Championships, won by West Virginia Mountaineers
