= 2013 in shooting =

This article lists the main target shooting events and their results for 2013.

== World Events ==
=== International Shooting Sport Federation ===
- 16–24 September: 2013 World Shotgun Championships held in Lima, Peru.

==== ISSF World Cup ====
- 2013 ISSF World Cup

=== International Confederation of Fullbore Rifle Associations ===
- 2013 ICFRA F-Class World Championships held at the NRA Whittington Center in Raton, New Mexico, United States.
  - F-Open Team winners (Farquharson Trophy): Australia (AUS)
  - F-TR Team winners (Richardson Cup): United States (USA)
  - F-Open World Champion: Kenny Adams (USA), wins Milcun Shield
  - F-TR World Champion: Nikolas Taylor (USA), wins Brian Boru Trophy

=== FITASC ===
2013 Results.

=== Island Games ===
- 14–19 July: Shooting at the 2013 Island Games in Bermuda.

=== Summer Universiade ===
- 12–17 July: Shooting at the 2013 Summer Universiade held in Kazan, Russia.

== Regional Events ==
=== Americas ===
==== Bolivarian Games ====
- 17–23 November: Shooting at the 2013 Bolivarian Games in Trujillo, Peru.

=== Asia ===
==== Asian Shooting Championships ====
- 18–26 October: 2013 Asian Airgun Championships held at the Azadi Sport Complex in Tehran, Iran.
- 1–10 October: 2013 Asian Shotgun Championships in Almaty, Kazakhstan.

==== Asian Youth Games ====
- 18–21 August: Shooting at the 2013 Asian Youth Games in Nanjing, China.

==== Southeast Asian Games ====
- 11–17 December: Shooting at the 2013 Southeast Asian Games in Yangon, Myanmar.

=== Europe ===
==== European Shooting Confederation ====
- 25 February – 3 March: 2013 European 10 m Events Championships in Odense, Denmark.
- 21 July – 4 August: 2013 European Shooting Championships in Osijek, Croatia.
- 28 July – 8 August: 2013 European Shotgun Championships in Suhl, Germany.

==== Games of the Small States of Europe ====
- 28–31 May: Shooting at the 2013 Games of the Small States of Europe held in Luxembourg.

==== Mediterranean Games ====
- 23–28 June: Shooting at the 2013 Mediterranean Games in Mersin, Turkey.

==== "B Matches" ====
- 31 January – 2 February: InterShoot in Den Haag, Netherlands.
- RIAC held in Strassen, Luxembourg.

== National Events ==
=== United Kingdom ===
==== NRA Imperial Meeting ====
- July, held at the National Shooting Centre, Bisley.
  - Queen's Prize winner: J. Corbett (GBR)
  - Grand Aggregate winner: DC Luckman (GBR)
  - Ashburton Shield winners: Dollar Academy
  - Kolapore Winners: Great Britain (GBR)
  - National Trophy Winners: England (ENG)
  - Elcho Shield winners: England (ENG)
  - Vizianagram winners: House of Commons

==== NSRA National Meeting ====
- August, held at the National Shooting Centre, Bisley
  - Earl Roberts British Prone Champion: W.P.Baird (SCO)

=== USA ===
- 2013 NCAA Rifle Championships, won by West Virginia Mountaineers.
