= Eleanor Bezzina =

Maltese sports shooter (born 1977)

Personal information
- Born: 25 March 1977 (age 49) Malta

Sport
- Sport: Sports shooting
Medal record
Women's Shooting
Representing Malta
Games of the Small States of Europe
| Gold medal – first place | 2013 Luxembourg | 10 m air pistol |
| Gold medal – first place | 2019 Montenegro | 10 m air pistol |
| Silver medal – second place | 2017 San Marino | 10 m air pistol |

Eleanor Bezzina (born 25 March 1977) is a Maltese sports shooter who has represented Malta at the 2016 and 2020 Summer Olympics.

== Early and personal life ==
Eleanor Bezzina is the second child of Josephine and Victor Bezzina. She grew up in Tarxien, where she enjoyed visiting her father's bakery, playing outside, and helping her grandfather care for his animals. In the summer, she visited Birzebbuga and Delimara to swim, and visited her maternal grandmother in Lija.

As a child, Bezzina played tennis and rode horses beginning at age six.

Bezzina attended primary school in Tarxien, and then Carlo Diacono School in Zejtun and G.F. Abela Junior College in Msida. Bezzina attended the University of Malta, where she competed a degree in management.

== Career ==
Bezzina previously played water polo and netball; she was a member of the RMF Birzebbuga Netball Team for 19 years, and of the San Giljan Waterpolo Club for three years. She was introduced to sports shooting during a clay pigeon shooting event at Bidnija Ranges. She began practicing sports shooting in October 2009.

Bezzina enjoys listening to music while training, with favorites including local bands and 1970s rock, such as Pink Floyd and Led Zeppelin.

=== Competitions ===
She competed at the 2010 Commonwealth Games and at the 2011 GSSE in Liechtenstein, where she finished in fifth place in her event. She won the 2012 Welsh Open Championship and 2013 Scottish Open Championship in her event. In 2013, Bezzina also won gold at the Games of the Small States of Europe (GSSE), held in Luxembourg. She competed in the 2014 World Championships.

She competed in the women's 10 metre air pistol event at the 2016 Summer Olympics.

She won a silver medal at 2017 GSSE in San Marino. She competed in the 2018 Commonwealth Games in Gold Coast, finishing in fourth place in the finals of the 10m air pistol and 25m pistol events. She also competed in the 2018 World Championships.

In 2019, won a gold at 2019 GSSE in Montenegro. That year, Bezzina qualified in the three finals of InterShoot, an air pistol and air rifle competition, in The Hague, Netherlands, although she did not win any of the events. She also received the Lawrence Darmanin Challenge Cup from the Malta Air Rifle and Pistol Shooting Club (MARPSC) for her performance in air pistol for the 2018–2019 season.

She competed at the 2020 Summer Olympics, in Women's 10 m air pistol and Women's 25 m pistol. In 2021, she competed in the 2021 European Championships.

=== Honours ===
Bezzina was the Maltese flagbearer in the 2013 Mediterranean Games in Turkey and one of Malta's two flag bearers during the opening ceremony of the 2020 Summer Olympics. She was the Team Captain of the Maltese delegation for 2023 GSSE.

In 2018, she was also named Malta's Sportswoman of the Year.
