= Luxembourg Shooting Federation =

Governing body

- Sport: ISSF Shooting Sports
- Jurisdiction: Luxembourg
- Founded: 6 November 1953
- Affiliation: ISSF
- Regional affiliation: ESC
- Headquarters: Strassen
- President: Claudia Dall'Agnol
- Vice president(s): Romain Gross
- Secretary: Marianne Meiers

Official website
- www.fltas.lu
- (Luxembourg)

The Luxembourg Shooting Federation (French: Fédération Luxembourgeoise de Tir aux Armes Sportives (FLTAS)) is the national governing body for International Shooting Sport Federation (ISSF) events within the Grand Duchy of Luxembourg. The Federation is recognised by the Luxembourg Olympic and Sporting Committee. It is a member of the ISSF and the European Shooting Confederation. The Federation organises the annual RIAC competition for 10metre air rifle and air pistol every December.

== History ==
The Federation was founded on 6 November 1953 as the Fédération Luxembourgeoise des Armes Sportives de Chasse (FLTASC). It received recognition from the Luxembourg Olympic and Sporting Committee (COSL) on 31 March 1954.

Luxembourg was a founding member of the Games of the Small States of Europe in 1984, and has won a number of medals in the shooting events.

== Events ==
=== RIAC International Competition ===
The Federation has organised the RIAC airgun competition for several decades, building an international following. RIAC is one of a number of unsanctioned "B" competitions in Europe including InterShoot, the Intarso Reflex Shooting Cup (IRS Cup) and International Shooting Competition of Hanover (ISCH), which are not supervised by the ISSF or ESC but are generally recognised by coaches and national governing bodies as high quality events, particularly for development athletes.

RIAC was a founding member of AirOShoot in 2019.

== World Class Performance ==
As of 2023, Luxembourg's best result in the Olympic shooting events was Jean-Claude Kremer's 27th-place finish at the 1992 Olympic Games in the Men's 10metre Air Rifle.

== See also ==
- RIAC
- AirOShoot
