= 2015 in shooting =

This article lists the main target shooting events and their results for 2015.

== World Events ==
=== International Shooting Sport Federation ===
- June 20 - July 11 2015 World Shotgun Championships, held in Lonato del Garda, Italy

==== ISSF World Cup ====
- 2015 ISSF World Cup
- 2015 ISSF Junior World Cup

=== International Confederation of Fullbore Rifle Associations ===
2015 ICFRA World Long Range Championships - Camp Perry, USA
Event	Gold	Silver	Bronze
Palma Trophy	Australia	Great Britain	South Africa
Individual	B Emms (AUS)	N Ball (GBR)	M Pozzebon (AUS)
Under-21 Champion	W Burbach (USA)		
Under-25 Champion	Jack Alexander (GBR)		
Veterans Champion	David Tubb (USA)		

=== International Practical Shooting Confederation ===
- September 13–19: 2015 IPSC Shotgun World Shoot in Agna, Italy

=== FITASC ===
2015 Results

=== Island Games ===
- June 27 - July 3: Shooting at the 2015 Island Games in Jersey

=== Military World Games ===
- October 2–11: Shooting at the 2015 Military World Games in Mungyeong, South Korea

=== Summer Universiade ===
- July 5–10: Shooting at the 2015 Summer Universiade in Naju, South Korea

== Regional Events ==
=== Africa ===
==== African Shooting Championships ====
- November 29 - December 6: 2015 African Shooting Championships in Cairo, Egypt

=== Americas ===
==== Pan American Games ====
- July 12–19: Shooting at the 2015 Pan American Games held at the Pan Am Shooting Centre in Toronto, Canada

=== Asia ===
==== Asian Shooting Championships ====
- September 25 - October 1: 2015 Asian Airgun Championships held on the Dr. Karni Singh Shooting Range in Delhi, India.
- November 1–12: 2015 Asian Shooting Championships in Kuwait City.

==== Pacific Games ====
- July 6–11: Shooting at the 2015 Pacific Games in Port Moresby, Papua New Guinea

==== Southeast Asian Games ====
- June 6–12: Shooting at the 2015 Southeast Asian Games in Singapore

=== Europe ===
==== European Games ====
- June 13–19: Shooting at the 2015 European Games in Baku, Azerbaijan

==== European Shooting Confederation ====
- March 3–7: 2015 European 10 m Events Championships in Arnhem, Netherlands
- July 19–31: 2015 European Shooting Championships in Maribor, Slovenia

==== Games of the Small States of Europe ====
- June 2–4: Shooting at the 2015 Games of the Small States of Europe

== National Events ==
=== United Kingdom ===
==== NRA Imperial Meeting ====
- July, held at the National Shooting Centre, Bisley
  - Queen's Prize winner: David Calvert (NIR)
  - Grand Aggregate winner: Dr GCD Barnett
  - Ashburton Shield winners: Ellesmere College
  - Kolapore Winners: Great Britain (GBR)
  - National Trophy Winners: England (ENG)
  - Elcho Shield winners: England (ENG)
  - Vizianagram winners: House of Commons

==== NSRA National Meeting ====
- August, held at the National Shooting Centre, Bisley
  - Earl Roberts British Prone Champion: Michelle Smith (GBR)

=== USA ===
- 2015 NCAA Rifle Championships, won by West Virginia Mountaineers
