= Ásgeir Sigurgeirsson =

Icelandic sport shooter (born 1985)

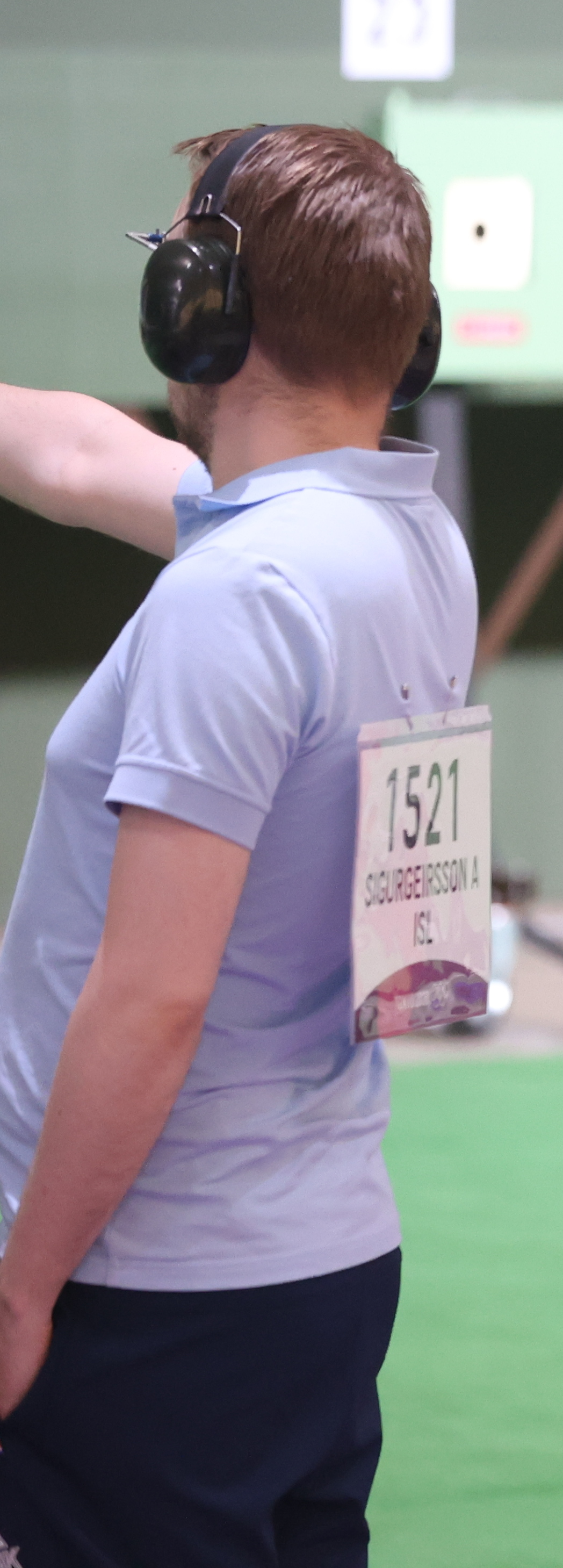
- Ásgeir Sigurgeirsson at the 2020 Summer Olympics

Personal information
- Born: 2 September 1985 (age 40) Reykjavík, Iceland
Medal record
Men's shooting
Representing Iceland
Games of the Small States of Europe
Gold medal – first place	2011 Liechtenstein	10 m air pistol
Gold medal – first place	2017 San Marino	10 m air pistol
Gold medal – first place	2019 Montenegro	10 m air pistol
Silver medal – second place	2013 Luxembourg	10 m air pistol

Ásgeir Sigurgeirsson (born 2 September 1985 in) is an Icelandic sport shooter who competes in the men's 10 metre air pistol. At the 2012 Summer Olympics, he finished 14th in the qualifying round, failing to make the cut for the final. He also took part in the 50 metre pistol, finishing in 32nd place.
