= Kosovo at the 2015 European Games =

- IOC code: KOS
- NOC: Olympic Committee of Kosovo
- Website: www.noc-kosovo.org

in Baku, Azerbaijan 12 – 28 June 2015
- Competitors: 19 in 9 sports
- Flag bearer: Majlinda Kelmendi
- Medals Ranked 40th: Gold 0 Silver 0 Bronze 1 Total 1

European Games appearances (overview)
- 2015; 2019; 2023; 2027

Kosovo competed at the 2015 European Games, in Baku, Azerbaijan from 12 to 28 June 2015.

== Medalists ==
Medal	Name	Sport	Event	Date
Bronze	Nora Gjakova	Judo	Women's 57 kg	25 June

== Sports ==
As Kosovo's independence was disputed by Serbia it was only eligible to participate in Aquatics (Diving, Swimming, Synchronised swimming and Water polo), Cycling (BMX, Mountain biking and Road), Gymnastics (Acrobatic, Aerobic, Artistic, Rhythmic and Trampoline), Karate and Wrestling.

== Archery ==
Kosovo entered one male and one female archer, thereby entitling it also to compete in the mixed team event.

Athlete	Event	Ranking round		Round of 64	Round of 32	Round of 16	Quarterfinals	Semifinals	Final / BM	
Athlete	Event	Score	Seed	Opposition Score	Opposition Score	Opposition Score	Opposition Score	Opposition Score	Opposition Score	Rank
Hazir Asllani	Men's individual	554	64	Nespoli (ITA); L 0–6	Did not advance					33
Lirije Sahiti	Women's individual	446	62	Valeeva (ITA); L w/o	Did not advance					33
Lirije Sahiti; Hazir Asllani	Mixed team	1000	29	—		Did not advance				17

== Boxing ==
Athlete	Event	Round of 32	Round of 16	Quarterfinals	Semifinals	Final	
Athlete	Event	Opposition Result	Opposition Result	Opposition Result	Opposition Result	Opposition Result	Rank
Naser Shala	Men's 64 kg	Amzile (France); L 0–3	Did not advance				
Armend Xhoxhaj	Men's 81 kg	Harcsa (Hungary); W 3–0	Khyzhniak (Ukraine); L 1–2	Did not advance			

== Shooting ==
=== Women ===
Athlete	Event	Qualification		Final	
Athlete	Event	Points	Rank	Points	Rank
Lumturie Rama	10 m air pistol	351	36	Did not advance	
Urata Rama	10 m air rifle	389.1	39	Did not advance	

== Karate ==
Men

Athlete	Event	Group stage			Semifinal	Final / BM	
Athlete	Event	Opposition Score	Opposition Score	Opposition Score	Opposition Score	Opposition Score	Rank
Alvin Karaqi	Men's 84 kg	(Turkey) Aktaş (TUR); W 3-1	(Italy) Maestri (ITA); W 3-0	(Poland) Warda (POL); W 4–1	(Azerbaijan) Mamayev (AZE); L 1–6	(Turkey) Karaqi (TUR); L 3-4	4th
