= Jeff Henckels =

Luxembourgish archer (born 1984)

Medal record

Men's archery

Representing Luxembourg

Games of the Small States of Europe
Gold medal – first place	2017 San Marino	Individual
Gold medal – first place	2017 San Marino	Team
Silver medal – second place	2017 San Marino	Mixed team

Jeff Henckels (born 30 August 1984 in Luxembourg City) is an athlete from Luxembourg that competes in archery.

Henckels competed at the 2004 Summer Olympics in men's individual archery. He was defeated in the first elimination round by Chen Szu-Yuan, placing 56th overall. At the 2012 Summer Olympics, he was again knocked out in the first round, losing 6–2 to Rick van der Ven.
