= Andreas Charalambous =

Cypriot sports shooter (born 2001)

Personal information
- Nationality: Cypriot
- Born: 26 July 2001 (age 24) Limassol, Cyprus
- Height: 1.75 m (5 ft 9 in)
- Weight: 68 kg (150 lb; 10 st 10 lb)

Sport
- Sport: Sports shooting
Medal record
Men's Shooting
Representing Cyprus
Games of the Small States of Europe
Silver medal – second place	2019 Montenegro	10m air rifle

Andreas Charalambous (born 26 July 2001) is a Cypriot sports shooter. He competed in the 10m Air Rifle event at the 2019 Games of the Small States of Europe, where he took the silver medal.
