= Elena Mousikou =

Cypriot archer (born 1988)

Medal record

Women's Archery

Representing Cyprus

Games of the Small States of Europe
Gold medal – first place	2017 San Marino	Individual
Gold medal – first place	2017 San Marino	Mixed team

Elena Mousikou (born 7 November 1988) is an athlete from Cyprus who competes in archery.

At the 2008 Summer Olympics in Beijing Mousikou finished her ranking round with a total of 589 points. This gave her the 56th seed for the final competition bracket in which she faced Nami Hayakawa in the first round. The archer from Japan was too strong and eliminated Mousikou straight away with a 112-103 score.
