= Nordgren =

Nordgren, Nordgreen, Nordgrén is a Swedish surname, a 'soldier name' from Uppland. It may refer to:

== People ==
- Adam Nordgren, midfielder for Assi IF
- Alexander Nordgren, member of Christoffer Sundgren's team
- Andie Nordgren, coiner of relationship anarchy and producer for Eve Online
- Anna Nordgren, painter
- Annika Nordgren Christensen operator at TV4 Newsmill
- Becky Nordgren (born 1961), American politician
- Brian Nordgren, rugbyist
- Erik Nordgren, musician
- Gösta "Snoddas" Nordgren, entertainer
- Hampus Nordgren Hemlin former member of Kate Boy
- Hannes Nordgren, member of Olofströms IK
- Ingemar Nordgren, historian researcher of the Ring of Pietroassa
- Joseph Nordgren, physicist
- Leif Nordgren, biathlete
- Loran Nordgren, co-proposer of unconscious thought theory
- Mats Nordgren, Swedish international footballer
- Matt Nordgren, cast member in Most Eligible Dallas and quarter back in the 2005 Texas Longhorns football team
- Niklas Nordgren, hockey forward born in 1979
- Niklas Nordgren (born 2000), competed in Finland at the 2016 Winter Youth Olympics
- Olivia Nordgren, typographer
- Olov Nordgren, coach of Assi IF
- Otto Nordgren, member of Olofströms IK
- Pehr Henrik Nordgren, composer
- Per Nordgren, member of Grotesque (band)
- Peter Nordgren, gold medalist in shooting at the 2013 Island Games
- Pontus Nordgren, gold medalist in shooting at the 2013 Island Games
- Sharon Nordgren, politician
- Sune Nordgren, former director of the National Museum of Art, Architecture and Design
- Tyler Nordgren, astronomer who worked on the MarsDial design team, researched Chi Cassiopeiae

== Characters ==
- George Nordgren from Arthur

== See also ==
- Nordegren (disambiguation)
