= Shooting at the 2016 Summer Olympics – Women's 10 metre air rifle =

Women's 10 metre air rifle at the Games of the XXXI Olympiad
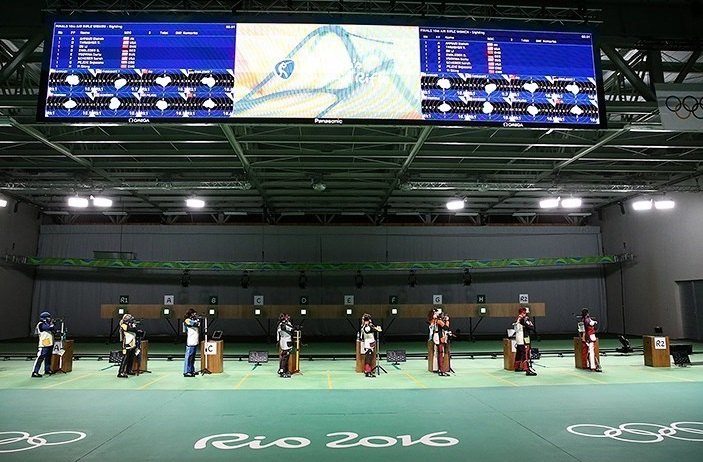
- View down the shooting range at the National Shooting Center, during the Women's 10 metre air rifle.
- Venue: National Shooting Center
- Date: 6 August 2016
- Competitors: 51 from 37 nations
- Winning score: 208.0 OR

Medalists
1st place, gold medalist(s)		Virginia Thrasher	United States
2nd place, silver medalist(s)		Du Li	China
3rd place, bronze medalist(s)		Yi Siling	China

The women's 10 metre air rifle event at the 2016 Summer Olympics took place on 6 August 2016 at the National Shooting Center.

The event consisted of two rounds: a qualifier and a final. In the qualifier, each shooter fired 40 shots with an air rifle at 10 metres distance from the standing position. Scores for each shot were in increments of . 1, with a maximum score of 10.9.

The top 8 shooters in the qualifying round moved on to the final round. There, they fired an additional 20 shots. These shots scored in increments of .1, with a maximum score of 10.9.

19 year-old shooter Virginia Thrasher won the event with the score of 208.0, breaking the Olympic record and became the first gold-medalist of 2016 Summer Olympics

The medals were presented by Thomas Bach, IOC President and Olegario Vázquez Raña, President of the International Shooting Sport Federation.

== Records ==
Prior to this competition, the existing world and Olympic records were as follows.

Qualification records
World record	Chen Dongqi (CHN)	422.9	Munich, Germany	28 May 2015
Olympic record	ISSF Rule changed on 1 January 2013	—	—	—

Final records
World record	Yi Siling (CHN)	211.0	Beijing, China	3 July 2014
Olympic record	ISSF Rule changed on 1 January 2013	—	—	—

The following records were established during the competition:

Date	Event	Name	Nation	Mark	Record
6 August	Qualification	Du Li	China	420.7	OR
6 August	Final	Virginia Thrasher	United States	208.0	OR

== Qualification round ==
Rank	Athlete	Country	1	2	3	4	Total	Inner 10s	Shoot Off	Notes
1	Du Li	China	104.5	106.0	104.8	105.4	420.7			Q, OR
2	Barbara Engleder	Germany	105.2	104.1	105.7	105.3	420.3			Q
3	Elaheh Ahmadi	Iran	104.5	103.5	104.0	105.8	417.8			Q
4	Daria Vdovina	Russia	103.9	104.7	104.7	104.1	417.4			Q
5	Sarah Scherer	United States	105.2	103.6	103.8	104.2	416.8			Q
6	Virginia Thrasher	United States	103.4	104.5	105.2	103.2	416.3			Q
7	Snježana Pejčić	Croatia	104.3	102.9	103.5	105.3	416.0			Q
8	Yi Siling	China	103.5	104.7	105.4	102.3	415.9			Q
9	Natallia Kalnysh	Ukraine	103.7	104.0	104.0	104.1	415.8			
10	Olivia Hofmann	Austria	103.4	102.7	104.9	104.7	415.7			
11	Najmeh Khedmati	Iran	102.7	104.1	104.5	104.4	415.7			
12	Ivana Maksimović	Serbia	104.2	105.0	102.4	103.8	415.4			
13	Selina Gschwandtner	Germany	102.5	104.5	103.8	104.0	414.8			
14	Gankhuyagiin Nandinzayaa	Mongolia	104.1	104.4	102.9	103.4	414.8			
15	Jennifer McIntosh	Great Britain	103.4	102.9	103.4	105.0	414.7			
16	Nina Christen	Switzerland	104.0	102.7	103.8	104.2	414.7			
17	Živa Dvoršak	Slovenia	103.5	105.3	102.1	103.8	414.7			
18	Nikola Mazurová	Czech Republic	104.4	102.0	103.4	104.6	414.4			
19	Park Hae-mi	South Korea	103.4	102.9	104.2	103.9	414.4			
20	Fernanda Russo	Argentina	103.5	103.4	104.1	103.4	414.4			
21	Sarah Hornung	Switzerland	102.8	104.6	103.9	103.0	414.3			
22	Julianna Miskolczi	Hungary	102.9	104.6	103.7	102.8	414.0			
23	Valentina Gustin	Croatia	105.4	101.2	103.1	104.2	413.9			
24	Goretti Zumaya	Mexico	103.0	104.9	102.8	103.2	413.9			
25	Jasmine Ser Xiang Wei	Singapore	102.6	103.9	102.8	104.2	413.5			
26	Andrea Arsović	Serbia	104.3	103.4	102.9	102.9	413.5			
27	Shaimaa Abdel-Latif-Hashad	Egypt	102.0	103.9	103.6	103.7	413.2			
28	Minhal Sohail	Pakistan	102.5	104.1	104.5	102.1	413.2			
29	Agnieszka Nagay	Poland	104.8	102.3	102.4	103.3	412.8			
30	Malin Westerheim	Norway	102.2	103.0	103.5	103.5	412.2			
31	Eglis Yaima Cruz	Cuba	102.1	104.2	101.7	104.1	412.1			
32	Adéla Bruns	Czech Republic	103.0	103.2	102.3	103.3	411.8			
33	Petra Zublasing	Italy	101.0	103.3	104.2	103.1	411.6			
34	Apurvi Chandela	India	104.2	102.7	103.3	101.4	411.6			
35	Tatjana Đekanović	Bosnia and Herzegovina	101.9	102.3	102.9	103.7	410.8			
36	Kim Eun-hye	South Korea	102.2	103.0	103.3	102.3	410.8			
37	Yelizaveta Korol	Kazakhstan	100.3	103.9	103.4	103.0	410.6			
38	Stine Nielsen	Denmark	102.3	102.4	102.3	103.1	410.1			
39	Jennifer Hens	Australia	104.4	103.5	102.3	99.9	410.1			
40	Sylwia Bogacka	Poland	103.6	102.5	101.5	101.5	409.1			
41	Amelia Fournel	Argentina	103.2	103.0	100.8	100.9	407.9			
42	Nina Balaban	Macedonia	102.5	102.9	102.1	100.2	407.7			
43	Yarimar Mercado	Puerto Rico	104.7	102.6	99.8	99.5	406.6			
44	Carina García	Bolivia	99.3	101.2	102.7	102.4	405.6			
45	Kunzang Lenchu	Bhutan	102.4	100.9	100.5	101.1	404.9			
46	Dianelys Pérez	Cuba	100.9	103.4	99.9	99.3	403.5			
47	Ayonika Paul	India	102.0	104.5	102.5	94.0	403.0			
48	Urata Rama	Kosovo	98.9	100.9	101.3	101.2	402.3			
49	Hadir Mekhimar	Egypt	99.9	98.5	101.4	101.5	401.3			
50	Rosane Ewald	Brazil	100.0	95.6	100.9	100.4	396.9			
51	Esther Barrugués	Andorra	99.7	97.2	101.6	98.4	396.9			

== Final ==
Rk	Athlete	1	2	3	4	5	6	7	8	9	10	11	12	13	14	15	16	17	18	19	20	Final	Notes
1st place, gold medalist(s)	Virginia Thrasher; United States	10.9	9.7	10.5	10.0	10.8	10.5	10.5	10.0	10.6	10.1	10.2	10.7	10.6	10.5	10.0	10.3	10.7	10.5	10.5	10.4	208.0	OR
2nd place, silver medalist(s)	Du Li; China	10.5	9.9	10.3	10.9	10.4	10.0	10.5	10.3	9.7	10.5	9.6	10.8	10.5	10.4	10.3	10.8	10.2	10.8	10.5	10.1	207.0	
3rd place, bronze medalist(s)	Yi Siling; China	10.5	10.2	10.6	10.5	10.6	10.7	9.9	10.3	9.6	10.7	9.5	10.1	10.6	10.4	10.6	10.5	10.3	9.8	—N/a		185.4	
4	Barbara Engleder; Germany	9.8	10.4	10.3	10.5	10.6	10.1	10.4	10.7	9.9	10.6	9.9	10.6	10.0	10.3	10.7	10.2	—N/a				165.0	
5	Daria Vdovina; Russia	10.0	10.3	10.5	10.3	9.9	10.3	10.6	10.4	10.7	10.7	10.0	10.3	9.2	10.3	—N/a						143.5	
6	Elaheh Ahmadi; Iran	10.3	9.9	10.6	10.1	10.5	9.9	9.5	10.4	10.4	10.7	10.5	9.7	—N/a								122.5	
7	Snježana Pejčić; Croatia	10.1	10.7	10.5	9.5	10.0	10.0	10.7	10.0	10.6	9.9	—N/a										102.0	
8	Sarah Scherer; United States	10.4	9.6	10.1	9.1	10.1	10.1	9.0	10.2	—N/a												78.6	
