= Xiaoxin Yang =

Monégasque table tennis player (born 1988)

Personal information
- Native name: 杨晓欣
- Nationality: Chinese (before 2017); Monégasque (after 2017)
- Born: Yang Xiaoxin (Note: In this Chinese name, the family name is Yang.); 8 January 1988 (age 38) Beijing, China
- Height: 155 cm (5 ft 1 in)
- Weight: 48 kg (106 lb)

Sport
- Sport: Table tennis
- Club: CP Lys-lez-Lannoy Lille Métropole (France)
- Playing style: Right-handed shakehand grip
- Highest ranking: 10 (5 July 2022)
- Current ranking: 23 (5 November 2024)
Medal record
Women's table tennis
Representing Monaco
European Games
Silver medal – second place	2023 Kraków–Małopolska	Singles
Mediterranean Games
Gold medal – first place	2022 Oran	Singles
Silver medal – second place	2018 Tarragona	Singles
Silver medal – second place	2026 Taranto	Singles
Games of the Small States of Europe
Gold medal – first place	2015 Reykjavík	Singles
Gold medal – first place	2019 Tivat	Singles
Gold medal – first place	2019 Tivat	Doubles
Gold medal – first place	2023 Msida	Singles
Silver medal – second place	2015 Reykjavík	Doubles
Silver medal – second place	2023 Msida	Team
Bronze medal – third place	2019 Tivat	Team
Bronze medal – third place	2023 Msida	Doubles

Xiaoxin Yang
- Traditional Chinese: 楊曉欣
- Simplified Chinese: 杨晓欣
Transcriptions
Standard Mandarin
- Hanyu Pinyin: Yáng Xiǎoxīn

Xiaoxin Yang (Chinese: 杨晓欣; born 8 January 1988) is a table tennis player. Born in China, she has represented Monaco internationally since 2013 and became a Monegasque citizen in 2017. She has represented Monaco at the Olympics twice - in 2021, where she reached finished T17 in the women's singles and served as the nation's flag bearer at the opening ceremony, and 2024, where she lost in the first round of the women's singles.

== Finals ==
Result	Year	Tournament	Opponent	Score	Ref
Winner	2013	Swiss Open	(Hungary) Georgina Póta	4–1	
Winner	2014	ITTF World Tour, Croatia Open	(Japan) Misako Wakamiya	4–1	
Winner	2015	Games of the Small States of Europe	(Luxembourg) Sarah De Nutte	3–0	
Winner	2016	Swiss Open	(Hungary) Georgina Póta	4–1	
Winner	2016	ITTF World Tour, Czech Open	(Japan) Maki Shiomi	4–0	
Runner-up	2018	Mediterranean Games	(Egypt) Dina Meshref	1–4	
Winner	2018	Luxembourg Open	(Russia) Anna Blazhko	4–0	
Winner	2019	Games of the Small States of Europe	(Cyprus) Louiza Kourea	3–0	
Runner-up	2020	ITTF Challenge, Spanish Open	(Japan) Honoka Hashimoto	1–4	
Winner	2021	WTT Contender Budapest	(Russia) Elizabet Abraamian	4–0	
Winner	2021	ITTF Czech International Open	(Russia) Mariia Tailakova	4–0	
Runner-up	2021	WTT Contender Tunis	(Czech Republic) Hana Matelová	3–4	
Winner	2022	Mediterranean Games	(Portugal) Shao Jieni	4–0	
Runner-up	2022	WTT Contender Nova Gorica	(South Korea) Shin Yu-bin	3–4	
Winner	2023	Games of the Small States of Europe	(Malta) Camella Iacob	3–0	
Runner-up	2023	European Games	(Romania) Bernadette Szőcs	3–4	

== Notes ==
Olympic Games
Preceded by Brice Etès	Flagbearer for Monaco; Tokyo 2020	Succeeded by Incumbent
