= Carole Calmes =

Luxembourgish sports shooter

Personal information
- Born: 10 September 1978 (age 47) Luxembourg City, Luxembourg
- Height: 1.58 m (5 ft 2 in)
- Weight: 60 kg (130 lb)

Sport
- Sport: Sports shooting
Medal record
Games of the Small States of Europe
Gold medal – first place	2003 Malta	10 m air rifle
Gold medal – first place	2011 Liechtenstein	10 m air rifle
Gold medal – first place	2017 San Marino	10 m air rifle
Silver medal – second place	2015 Iceland	10 m air rifle
Bronze medal – third place	2005 Andorra	10 m air rifle
Bronze medal – third place	2013 Luxembourg	10 m air rifle

Carole Calmes (born 10 September 1978) is a Luxembourgish sports shooter. She competed in the Women's 10 metre air rifle event at the 2012 Summer Olympics.
