= Park Hae-mi (sport shooter) =

South Korean sports shooter

Personal information
- Born: 31 January 1990 (age 36)

Sport
- Sport: Sports shooting

Park Hae-mi (born 31 January 1990) is a South Korean sports shooter. She competed in the women's 10 metre air rifle event at the 2016 Summer Olympics. She finished with a score of 414.4 and was placed 19th.
