= Nordegren =

Nordegren is a Swedish surname and it may refer to:

- Elin Nordegren, Swedish model and ex-wife of professional golfer Tiger Woods
- Thomas Nordegren, Swedish journalist and writer

== See also ==
- Nordgren
