= Table tennis at the 2015 Games of the Small States of Europe =

The table tennis competition at the 2015 Games of the Small States of Europe took place from 2–6 June 2015 at the TBR Badminton Hall in Reykjavík.

== Medal summary ==
=== Medal table ===
Rank	Nation	Gold	Silver	Bronze	Total
1	Monaco	2	1	0	3
2	Luxembourg	1	2	1	4
3	Montenegro	1	1	2	4
4	Cyprus	0	0	2	2
4	Malta	0	0	2	2
6	San Marino	0	0	1	1
Totals (6 entries)		4	4	8	16

=== Medalists ===
Event	Gold	Silver	Bronze
Men's singles	Damien Provost (MON)	Irfan Cekic (MNE)	Marios Yiangou (CYP)
Men's singles	Damien Provost (MON)	Irfan Cekic (MNE)	Luka Bakic (MNE)
Men's doubles	Montenegro; Luka Bakic; Irfan Cekic	Luxembourg; Eric Glod; Gilles Michely	Cyprus; Marios Yiangou; Yiangos Yiangou
Men's doubles	Montenegro; Luka Bakic; Irfan Cekic	Luxembourg; Eric Glod; Gilles Michely	San Marino; Marco Vannucci; Lorenzo Ragni
Women's singles	Yang Xiaoxin (MON)	Sarah De Nutte (LUX)	Victoria Lucenkova (MLT)
Women's singles	Yang Xiaoxin (MON)	Sarah De Nutte (LUX)	Egle Tamasauskaite (LUX)
Women's doubles	Luxembourg; Sarah De Nutte; Ni Xialian	Monaco; Lauren Riley; Yang Xiaoxin	Montenegro; Sonja Jankovic; Neda Milacic Bogdanovic
Women's doubles	Luxembourg; Sarah De Nutte; Ni Xialian	Monaco; Lauren Riley; Yang Xiaoxin	Malta; Victoria Lucenkova; Jessica Pace
