= Shooting at the 2019 Games of the Small States of Europe =

- Location: (Montenegro) Budva
- Dates: 29–31 May

Sport shooting at the 2019 Games of the Small States of Europe was held at the SC Rea and Shooting Range in Budva from 29 to 31 May 2019.

== Medal table ==
* Host nation (Montenegro)

| Rank | Nation | Gold | Silver | Bronze | Total |
|---|---|---|---|---|---|
| 1 | Malta | 2 | 2 | 0 | 4 |
| 2 | Cyprus | 1 | 2 | 1 | 4 |
| 3 | Montenegro* | 1 | 1 | 2 | 4 |
| 4 | Luxembourg | 1 | 0 | 1 | 2 |
| 5 | Iceland | 1 | 0 | 0 | 1 |
| 6 | Monaco | 0 | 1 | 0 | 1 |
| 7 | Liechtenstein | 0 | 0 | 1 | 1 |
| 7 | San Marino | 0 | 0 | 1 | 1 |
| Totals (8 entries) | | 6 | 6 | 6 | 18 |

== Medalists ==
=== Men ===
| Event | Gold | Silver | Bronze |
|---|---|---|---|
| 10 m air pistol | Ásgeir Sigurgeirsson; Iceland | Boris Jeremenko; Monaco | Jean Marie Cirelli; Luxembourg |
| 10 m air rifle | Miloš Božović; Montenegro | Andreas Charalambous; Cyprus | Nemanja Obradović; Montenegro |
| Trap | Nikolas Kyriakou; Cyprus | William Chetcuti; Malta | Andrea Makri; Cyprus |
| Double trap | Gianluca Chetcuti; Malta | William Chetcuti; Malta | Gian Marco Berti; San Marino |

=== Women ===
| Event | Gold | Silver | Bronze |
|---|---|---|---|
| 10 m air pistol | Eleanor Bezzina; Malta | Jelena Pantović; Montenegro | Nevena Šaranović; Montenegro |
| 10 m air rifle | Sylvie Nockels; Luxembourg | Marilena Constantinou; Cyprus | Leonie Mautz; Liechtenstein |
