= Boules at the 2019 Games of the Small States of Europe =

- Venue: Olympic Park
- Location: (Montenegro) Budva
- Dates: 28–30 May

The boules competition at the 2019 Games of the Small States of Europe was held from 28 to 30 May 2019 at the Olympic Park in Budva.

== Medal summary ==
=== Medal table ===
* Host nation (Montenegro)

Rank	Nation	Gold	Silver	Bronze	Total
1	Luxembourg	3	1	1	5
2	Montenegro	1	1	0	2
3	Andorra	0	2	0	2
4	Monaco	0	0	3	3
Totals (4 entries)		4	4	4	12

=== Medalists ===
Event	Gold	Silver	Bronze
Men's lyonnaise singles	Miroslav Petković; Montenegro	Tomislav Ranković; Montenegro	Gianni Bresciano; Monaco
Men's pétanque singles	Claudio Contardi; Luxembourg	Philippe Santmann; Andorra	Massimo Santioni; Luxembourg
Men's pétanque doubles	Luxembourg; Claudio Contardi; Massimo Santioni	Andorra; Bruno Santmann; Philippe Santmann	Monaco; Jean-Luc Fuentes; Cincinnato Martire
Women's pétanque singles	Nathalie Demange; Luxembourg	Indira Ongaro; Luxembourg	Laurence Crovetto Viale; Monaco
