= Volleyball at the 2017 Games of the Small States of Europe =

The volleyball competition at the 2017 Games of the Small States of Europe was held at the Palestra A. Casadei, Serravalle from 30 May to 3 June 2017. The beach volleyball competition was held at special stage inside the Stadio di Baseball di Serravalle from 30 May to 2 June 2017.

== Medalists ==
Event	Gold	Silver	Bronze
Men's indoor	Luxembourg	Cyprus	San Marino
Women's indoor	Cyprus	San Marino	Luxembourg
Men's beach	Andorra; Genildo Cassiano Prado da Silva; Xavier Folguera Estruga	Liechtenstein; Manuel Gahr; Maximilian von Deichman	Monaco; Michael Chamy; Franck Gopcevic
Women's beach	San Marino; Silvia Bulgarelli; Debora Pini	Cyprus; Mariota Angelopoulou; Manolina Konstantinou	Monaco; Magali Muratore; Caroline Revel Chion

== Men ==
=== Indoor ===
Pos	Team	Pld	W	L	Pts	SW	SL	SR	SPW	SPL	SPR
1st place, gold medalist(s)	Luxembourg	4	4	0	11	12	2	6.000	340	277	1.227
2nd place, silver medalist(s)	Cyprus	4	3	1	10	11	5	2.200	377	328	1.149
3rd place, bronze medalist(s)	San Marino	4	2	2	5	6	9	0.667	323	341	0.947
4	Monaco	4	1	3	4	6	10	0.600	343	356	0.963
5	Iceland	4	0	4	0	3	12	0.250	289	370	0.781

Date	Time		Score		Set 1	Set 2	Set 3	Set 4	Set 5	Total	Report
30 May	12:30	Iceland	1–3	Cyprus	24–26	11–25	25–21	17–25		77–97	Report
30 May	17:30	San Marino	3–2	Monaco	23–25	25–20	16–25	30–28	15–13	109–111	Report
31 May	10:00	Luxembourg	3–0	Iceland	25–21	25–19	25–15			75–55	Report
31 May	17:30	San Marino	0–3	Cyprus	19–25	20–25	17–25			56–75	Report
1 June	12:30	Monaco	3–1	Iceland	22–25	25–21	25–16	25–15		97–77	Report
1 June	17:30	Cyprus	2–3	Luxembourg	25–18	25–22	21–25	16–25	23–25	110–115	Report
2 June	10:00	Luxembourg	3–0	Monaco	25–16	25–19	25–20			75–55	Report
2 June	20:45	San Marino	3–1	Iceland	22–25	29–27	25–12	25–16		101–80	Report
3 June	09:00	Cyprus	3–1	Monaco	25–15	20–25	25–21	25–19		95–80	Report
3 June	17:00	San Marino	0–3	Luxembourg	21–25	19–25	17–25			57–75	Report

=== Beach ===
==== Pool A ====
Pos	Team	Pld	W	L	Pts	SPW	SPL	SPR	SW	SL	SR	Qualification
1	(Andorra) Prado da Silva–Folguera Estruga	3	3	0	6	126	79	1.595	6	0	MAX	Semifinals
2	(Luxembourg) Lazzarin–Meres	3	2	1	5	134	133	1.008	4	4	1.000	Semifinals
3	(San Marino) Giorgetti–Paganelli	3	1	2	4	122	126	0.968	3	4	0.750	5th place match
4	(Montenegro) Bagarić–Bojić	3	0	3	3	94	138	0.681	1	6	0.167	7th place match

Date	Time		Score		Set 1	Set 2	Set 3	Total	Report
30 May	15:00	Da Silva–Folguera Estruga (Andorra)	2–0	(Luxembourg) Lazzarin–Meres	21–15	21–11		42–26	Report
30 May	20:00	Giorgetti–Paganelli (San Marino)	2–0	(Montenegro) Bagarić–Bojić	21–12	21–18		42–30	Report
31 May	15:00	Da Silva–Folguera Estruga (Andorra)	2–0	(Montenegro) Bagarić–Bojić	21–13	21–12		42–25	Report
31 May	20:00	Lazzarin–Meres (Luxembourg)	2–1	(San Marino) Giorgetti–Paganelli	18–21	21–19	15–12	54–52	Report
1 June	17:00	Lazzarin–Meres (Luxembourg)	2–1	(Montenegro) Bagarić–Bojić	21–16	18–21	15–2	54–39	Report
1 June	19:00	Da Silva–Folguera Estruga (Andorra)	2–0	(San Marino) Giorgetti–Paganelli	21–9	21–19		42–28	Report

==== Pool B ====
Pos	Team	Pld	W	L	Pts	SPW	SPL	SPR	SW	SL	SR	Qualification
1	(Liechtenstein) Gahr–Von Deichman	4	4	0	8	184	120	1.533	8	1	8.000	Semifinals
2	(Monaco) Chamy–Gopcevic	4	2	2	6	173	151	1.146	5	5	1.000	Semifinals
3	(Cyprus) Agathokleous–Efstathiou	4	2	2	6	158	145	1.090	5	4	1.250	5th place match
4	(Malta) Balzan–Raffa	4	2	2	6	165	171	0.965	5	5	1.000	7th place match
5	(Iceland) Valgeirsson–Valtýsson	4	0	4	4	75	168	0.446	0	8	0.000	

Date	Time		Score		Set 1	Set 2	Set 3	Total	Report
30 May	11:00	Gahr–Von Deichman (Liechtenstein)	2–0	(Iceland) Valgeirsson–Valtýsson	21–4	21–13		42–17	Report
30 May	12:00	Agathokleous–Efstathiou (Cyprus)	2–0	(Malta) Balzan–Raffa	21–12	21–19		42–31	Report
30 May	16:00	Gahr–Von Deichman (Liechtenstein)	2–0	(Cyprus) Agathokleous–Efstathiou	21–15	21–14		42–29	Report
30 May	17:00	Chamy–Gopcevic (Monaco)	2–0	(Iceland) Valgeirsson–Valtýsson	21–7	21–7		42–14	Report
31 May	11:00	Agathokleous–Efstathiou (Cyprus)	2–0	(Iceland) Valgeirsson–Valtýsson	21–11	21–11		42–22	Report
31 May	12:00	Chamy–Gopcevic (Monaco)	1–2	(Malta) Balzan–Raffa	21–14	16–21	12–15	49–50	Report
31 May	16:00	Agathokleous–Efstathiou (Cyprus)	1–2	(Monaco) Chamy–Gopcevic	21–14	16–21	8–15	45–50	Report
31 May	17:00	Gahr–Von Deichman (Liechtenstein)	2–1	(Malta) Balzan–Raffa	21–14	22–24	15–4	58–42	Report
1 June	15:00	Gahr–Von Deichman (Liechtenstein)	2–0	(Monaco) Chamy–Gopcevic	21–16	21–16		42–32	Report
1 June	16:00	Valgeirsson–Valtýsson (Iceland)	0–2	(Malta) Balzan–Raffa	10–21	12–21		22–42	Report

==== 7th place match ====
Date	Time		Score		Set 1	Set 2	Set 3	Total	Report
2 June	15:00	Bagarić–Bojić (Montenegro)	1–2	(Malta) Balzan–Raffa	21–17	11–21	7–15	39–53	Report

==== 5th place match ====
Date	Time		Score		Set 1	Set 2	Set 3	Total	Report
2 June	16:00	Giorgetti–Paganelli (San Marino)	2–0	(Cyprus) Agathokleous–Efstathiou	21–0	21–0		42–0	Report

==== Semifinals ====
Date	Time		Score		Set 1	Set 2	Set 3	Total	Report
2 June	13:00	Da Silva–Folguera Estruga (Andorra)	2–0	(Monaco) Chamy–Gopcevic	21–15	21–11		42–26	Report
2 June	14:00	Gahr–Von Deichman (Liechtenstein)	2–0	(Luxembourg) Lazzarin–Meres	21–12	21–16		42–28	Report

==== Bronze medal match ====
Date	Time		Score		Set 1	Set 2	Set 3	Total	Report
2 June	19:00	Chamy–Gopcevic (Monaco)	2–1	(Luxembourg) Lazzarin–Meres	14–21	21–13	15–13	50–47	Report

==== Gold medal match ====
Date	Time		Score		Set 1	Set 2	Set 3	Total	Report
2 June	20:00	Da Silva–Folguera Estruga (Andorra)	2–1	(Liechtenstein) Gahr–Von Deichman	17–21	21–15	15–11	53–47	Report

== Women ==
=== Indoor ===
Pos	Team	Pld	W	L	Pts	SW	SL	SR	SPW	SPL	SPR
1st place, gold medalist(s)	Cyprus	5	4	1	12	14	6	2.333	459	366	1.254
2nd place, silver medalist(s)	San Marino	5	4	1	11	14	7	2.000	456	400	1.140
3rd place, bronze medalist(s)	Luxembourg	5	3	2	10	13	8	1.625	453	425	1.066
4	Iceland	5	3	2	8	12	10	1.200	470	460	1.022
5	Malta	5	1	4	3	3	13	0.231	299	384	0.779
6	Liechtenstein	5	0	5	1	3	15	0.200	325	427	0.761

Date	Time		Score		Set 1	Set 2	Set 3	Set 4	Set 5	Total	Report
30 May	10:00	Luxembourg	3–0	Liechtenstein	25–23	25–18	25–14			75–55	Report
30 May	15:00	Iceland	1–3	Cyprus	22–25	25–22	22–25	14–25		83–97	Report
30 May	20:45	San Marino	3–0	Malta	25–12	25–16	25–11			75–39	Report
31 May	12:30	Cyprus	3–2	Luxembourg	25–19	21–25	22–25	25–11	15–13	108–93	Report
31 May	15:00	Malta	3–1	Liechtenstein	25–15	22–25	25–23	25–21		97–84	Report
31 May	20:45	San Marino	2–3	Iceland	21–25	25–20	25–20	16–25	7–15	94–105	Report
1 June	10:00	Liechtenstein	0–3	Cyprus	8–25	16–25	13–25			37–75	Report
1 June	15:00	Iceland	3–0	Malta	25–20	25–22	25–20			75–62	Report
1 June	20:45	San Marino	3–2	Luxembourg	25–15	20–25	19–25	25–22	15–8	104–95	Report
2 June	12:30	Cyprus	3–0	Malta	25–7	25–19	25–19			75–45	Report
2 June	15:00	Iceland	2–3	Luxembourg	25–23	25–23	15–25	27–29	10–15	102–115	Report
2 June	17:30	San Marino	3–0	Liechtenstein	25–22	25–18	25–17			75–57	Report
3 June	11:00	Luxembourg	3–0	Malta	25–13	25–23	25–20			75–56	Report
3 June	13:00	Liechtenstein	2–3	Iceland	11–25	25–23	20–25	25–17	11–15	92–105	Report
3 June	15:00	San Marino	3–2	Cyprus	20–25	25–22	25–20	23–25	15–12	108–104	Report

=== Beach ===
Pos	Team	Pld	W	L	Pts	SPW	SPL	SPR	SW	SL	SR
1st place, gold medalist(s)	(San Marino) Bulgarelli–Pini	5	5	0	10	210	121	1.736	10	0	MAX
2nd place, silver medalist(s)	(Cyprus) Angelopoulou–Konstantinou	5	4	1	9	199	132	1.508	8	2	4.000
3rd place, bronze medalist(s)	(Monaco) Muratore–Revel Chion	5	3	2	8	188	133	1.414	6	4	1.500
4	(Malta) Caruana Bonnici–Zarb	5	2	3	7	158	202	0.782	4	7	0.571
5	(Luxembourg) Grethen–Klerf	5	1	4	6	131	201	0.652	2	8	0.250
6	(Iceland) Gunnarsdóttir–Einarsdóttir	5	0	5	5	119	216	0.551	1	10	0.100

Date	Time		Score		Set 1	Set 2	Set 3	Total	Report
30 May	13:00	Muratore–Revel Chion (Monaco)	2–0	(Luxembourg) Grethen–Klerf	21–10	21–15		42–25	Report
30 May	14:00	Caruana Bonnici–Zarb (Malta)	2–1	(Iceland) Gunnarsdóttir–Einarsdóttir	21–16	12–21	15–11	48–48	Report
30 May	18:00	Grethen–Klerf (Luxembourg)	0–2	(Malta) Caruana Bonnici–Zarb	16–21	12–21		28–42	Report
30 May	19:00	Angelopoulou–Konstantinou (Cyprus)	0–2	(San Marino) Bulgarelli–Pini	19–21	12–21		31–42	Report
31 May	10:00	Gunnarsdóttir–Einarsdóttir (Iceland)	0–2	(Cyprus) Angelopoulou–Konstantinou	10–21	8–21		18–42	Report
31 May	13:00	Bulgarelli–Pini (San Marino)	2–0	(Monaco) Muratore–Revel Chion	21–12	21–19		42–31	Report
31 May	14:00	Angelopoulou–Konstantinou (Cyprus)	2–0	(Malta) Caruana Bonnici–Zarb	21–11	21–11		42–22	Report
31 May	18:00	Muratore–Revel Chion (Monaco)	2–0	(Iceland) Gunnarsdóttir–Einarsdóttir	21–4	21–5		42–9	Report
31 May	19:00	Bulgarelli–Pini (San Marino)	2–0	(Luxembourg) Grethen–Klerf	21–7	21–10		42–17	Report
1 June	13:00	Caruana Bonnici–Zarb' (Malta)	0–2	(Monaco) Muratore–Revel Chion	5–21	10–21		15–42	Report
1 June	14:00	Angelopoulou–Konstantinou (Cyprus)	2–0	(Luxembourg) Grethen–Klerf	21–11	21–8		42–19	Report
1 June	18:00	Muratore–Revel Chion (Monaco)	0–2	(Cyprus) Angelopoulou–Konstantinou	13–21	18–21		31–42	Report
1 June	20:00	Bulgarelli–Pini (San Marino)	2–0	(Iceland) Gunnarsdóttir–Einarsdóttir	21–4	21–7		42–11	Report
2 June	17:00	Grethen–Klerf (Luxembourg)	2–0	(Iceland) Gunnarsdóttir–Einarsdóttir	21–17	21–16		42–33	Report
2 June	18:00	Bulgarelli–Pini (San Marino)	2–0	(Malta) Caruana Bonnici–Zarb	21–15	21–16		42–31	Report
