= Table tennis at the 2019 Games of the Small States of Europe =

- Venue: Dvorana Župa Tivat
- Location: (Montenegro) Tivat
- Dates: 28 May –1 June

The table tennis competition at the 2019 Games of the Small States of Europe was held from 28 May to 1 June 2019 at the Dvorana Župa Tivat in Tivat.

== Medal summary ==
=== Medal table ===
* Host nation (Montenegro)

Rank	Nation	Gold	Silver	Bronze	Total
1	Monaco	3	1	3	7
2	Cyprus	2	2	1	5
3	Luxembourg	1	2	2	5
4	San Marino	0	1	2	3
5	Montenegro*	0	0	4	4
Totals (5 entries)		6	6	12	24

=== Medalists ===
Event	Gold	Silver	Bronze
Men's singles	Marios Yiangou; Cyprus	Anthony Geminiani; Monaco	Anthony Peretti; Monaco
Men's singles	Marios Yiangou; Cyprus	Anthony Geminiani; Monaco	Filip Radović; Montenegro
Women's singles	Yang Xiaoxin; Monaco	Louiza Kourea; Cyprus	Tessy Gonderinger; Luxembourg
Women's singles	Yang Xiaoxin; Monaco	Louiza Kourea; Cyprus	Yan Chimei; San Marino
Men's doubles	Monaco; Anthony Geminiani; Anthony Peretti	Cyprus; Hristo Hristonov; Marios Yiangou	Montenegro; Filip Radović; Filip Radulović
Men's doubles	Monaco; Anthony Geminiani; Anthony Peretti	Cyprus; Hristo Hristonov; Marios Yiangou	Luxembourg; Eric Glod; Gilles Michely
Women's doubles	Monaco; Ulrika Quist; Yang Xiaoxin	Luxembourg; Tessy Gonderinger; Egle Tamasauskaité	Cyprus; Louiza Kourea; Konstantina Meletie
Women's doubles	Monaco; Ulrika Quist; Yang Xiaoxin	Luxembourg; Tessy Gonderinger; Egle Tamasauskaité	San Marino; Chiara Morri; Yan Chimei
Men's team	Cyprus; Hristo Hristonov; Marios Yiangou	Luxembourg; Traian Ciociu; Eric Glod; Gilles Michely	Montenegro; Alan Jašarović; Filip Radović; Filip Radulović
Men's team	Cyprus; Hristo Hristonov; Marios Yiangou	Luxembourg; Traian Ciociu; Eric Glod; Gilles Michely	Monaco; Anthony Geminiani; Anthony Peretti; Martin Tiso
Women's team	Luxembourg; Tessy Gonderinger; Danielle Konsbrück; Egle Tamasauskaité	San Marino; Letizia Giardi; Chiara Morri; Yan Chimei	Montenegro; Snežana Ćulafić; Neda Milačić-Bogdanović; Ivona Petrić
Women's team	Luxembourg; Tessy Gonderinger; Danielle Konsbrück; Egle Tamasauskaité	San Marino; Letizia Giardi; Chiara Morri; Yan Chimei	Monaco; Ulrika Quist; Yang Xiaoxin
