= Table tennis at the 2017 Games of the Small States of Europe =

The table tennis competition at the 2017 Games of the Small States of Europe took place from 30 May to 3 June 2017 at the Kursaal Congress Center in the City of San Marino. Compared to previous competition at Games of the Small States of Europe, two new events were added, men's and women's team events, bringing total number to 6 events.

== Medal summary ==
=== Medal table ===
Rank	Nation	Gold	Silver	Bronze	Total
1	Luxembourg	4	3	0	7
2	Monaco	2	0	3	5
3	Montenegro	0	2	4	6
4	Malta	0	1	0	1
5	San Marino*	0	0	4	4
6	Cyprus	0	0	1	1
Totals (6 entries)		6	6	12	24

=== Medalists ===
Event	Gold	Silver	Bronze
Men's singles	Anthony Peretti (MON)	Gilles Michely (LUX)	Damien Provost (MON)
Men's singles	Anthony Peretti (MON)	Gilles Michely (LUX)	Filip Radović (MNE)
Men's doubles	Luxembourg; Traian Ciociu; Dragos-dan Olteanu	Montenegro; Luka Bakić; Filip Radović	Monaco; Damien Provost; Anthony Geminiani
Men's doubles	Luxembourg; Traian Ciociu; Dragos-dan Olteanu	Montenegro; Luka Bakić; Filip Radović	San Marino; Marco Vannucci; Lorenzo Ragni
Men's team	Monaco; Anthony Geminiani; Anthony Peretti; Damien Provost	Luxembourg; Traian Ciociu; Gilles Michely; Dragos-dan Olteanu	Montenegro; Luka Bakić; Filip Radović
Men's team	Monaco; Anthony Geminiani; Anthony Peretti; Damien Provost	Luxembourg; Traian Ciociu; Gilles Michely; Dragos-dan Olteanu	San Marino; Federico Giardi; Lorenzo Ragni; Marco Vannucci
Women's singles	Danielle Konsbruck (LUX)	Tessy Gonderinger (LUX)	Ivona Petrić (MNE)
Women's singles	Danielle Konsbruck (LUX)	Tessy Gonderinger (LUX)	Ulrika Quist (MON)
Women's doubles	Luxembourg; Tessy Gonderinger; Egle Tamasauskaite	Montenegro; Snežana Ćulafić; Ivona Petrić	Cyprus; Georgia Avraam; Konstantina Meletie
Women's doubles	Luxembourg; Tessy Gonderinger; Egle Tamasauskaite	Montenegro; Snežana Ćulafić; Ivona Petrić	San Marino; Letizia Giardi; Chiara Morri
Women's team	Luxembourg; Tessy Gonderinger; Danielle Konsbruck; Egle Tamasauskaite	Malta; Viktoria Lucenkova; Jessica Pace	Montenegro; Snežana Ćulafić; Ivona Petrić
Women's team	Luxembourg; Tessy Gonderinger; Danielle Konsbruck; Egle Tamasauskaite	Malta; Viktoria Lucenkova; Jessica Pace	San Marino; Letizia Giardi; Chiara Morri
