= Boules at the 2017 Games of the Small States of Europe =

The boules competition at the 2017 Games of the Small States of Europe took place on 30 and 31 May 2017 at the Bocciodromo in Borgo Maggiore. It was the first time boules were featured at Games of the Small States of Europe

== Medal summary ==
=== Medal table ===
Rank	Nation	Gold	Silver	Bronze	Total
1	Luxembourg	2	1	1	4
2	San Marino*	2	1	0	3
3	Montenegro	2	0	1	3
4	Monaco	1	3	2	6
5	Andorra	0	1	1	2
5	Malta	0	1	1	2
7	Liechtenstein	0	0	1	1
Totals (7 entries)		7	7	7	21

=== Medalists ===
Event	Gold	Silver	Bronze
Men's Lyonnaise Singles	Miroslav Petković (MNE)	Florian Valeri (MON)	Uro Milanović (MNE)
Men's Lyonnaise Doubles	Montenegro; Uro Milanović; Miroslav Petković; Tomislav Ranković; Dejan Stjepčević	Monaco; Giani Bresciano; Florian Valeri	Luxembourg; Gary Barone; Jerome Munhoven
Men's Raffle Singles	Enrico Dall'Olmo (SMR)	Jacopo Frisoni (SMR)	David Farrugia (MLT)
Men's Raffle Doubles	San Marino; Enrico Dall'Olmo; Jacopo Frisoni	Malta; David Farrugia; Reno Nazzareno Farrugia; Stefan Farrugia; Giuseppe Gemelli	Liechtenstein; Nicola Caroccia; Vinvenco Raffaele
Men's Petanque Singles	Cincinnato Martire (MON)	Claudio Contardi (LUX)	Frederic Breton Martin (AND)
Men's Petanque Doubles	Luxembourg; Claudio Contardi; Alain Laterza	Andorra; Frederic Breton Martin; Bruno Santmann Gabarron	Monaco; Jean-Luc Fuentes; Cincinnato Martire
Women's Petanque Singles	Nadia Fiorentini (LUX)	Marie-Laure Sanna (MON)	Aline Monge (MON)
