= Shooting at the 2011 Games of the Small States of Europe =

Shooting at the 2011 Games of the Small States of Europe was held from 31 May – 3 June 2011.

== Medal summary ==
=== Men ===
Event	Gold	Silver	Bronze
Air Rifle	Marc-André Kessler (LIE)	Kostis Antreas Pitsilloudis (CYP)	Michael Mattle (LIE)
Air Pistol	Asgeir Sigurgeirsson (ISL)	Mirko Bugli (SMR)	Thomas Videro (ISL)
Rifle 50 m Prone	Helgi Gudmundur Christensen (ISL)	Eric Lanza (MON)	Jon Thor Sigurgeirsson (ISL)

=== Women ===
Event	Gold	Silver	Bronze
Air Rifle	Carole Calmes (LUX)	Marilena Constantinou (CYP)	Esther Barrugués (AND)
Air Pistol	Erini Panteli (CYP)	Jorunn Hardardottir (ISL)	Magali Pierre Robaldo (MON)

=== Medal table ===
Rank	Nation	Gold	Silver	Bronze	Total
1	Iceland	2	2	1	5
2	Cyprus	1	2	0	3
3	Liechtenstein	1	0	1	2
4	Luxembourg	1	0	0	1
5	San Marino	0	1	0	1
6	Monaco	0	0	2	2
7	Andorra	0	0	1	1
Totals (7 entries)		5	5	5	15
