= Shooting at the 2017 Island Games =

- Dates: June 24 – 30
- Host city: Gotland, Sweden
- Venue: Svajde range, Visby
- Level: Senior

Shooting, for the 2017 Island Games, held at four locations in Gotland, Sweden in June 2017:

- Snögrinde, Klinte
- Svajde shooting range, Visby
- Skyttehall indoor range, Visby
- Hejdeby shooting range Visby

== General ==
The last two shooting events at the Island Games have been dominated by Jersey and Gotland, although at the last games in Jersey, 13 countries managed to get at least one gold medal.

All visiting competitors have to comply with Swedish customs for the temporary import of weapons and ammunition for the event.

== Medal table ==
* Host nation (Gotland)

Rank	Nation	Gold	Silver	Bronze	Total
1	Gotland (Gotland)*	15	9	7	31
2	Isle of Wight (IOW)	5	8	1	14
3	Jersey (JER)	5	4	8	17
4	Gibraltar (GIB)	4	6	7	17
5	Saaremaa	3	1	0	4
6	Guernsey (GGY)	2	3	1	6
7	Saint Helena	2	1	2	5
7	Åland (ALA)	2	1	2	5
9	Hitra Municipality	1	0	2	3
10	Faroe Islands (FRO)	1	0	1	2
11	Shetland	1	0	0	1
12	Cayman Islands (CAY)	0	4	2	6
13	Menorca	0	2	2	4
14	Isle of Man (IOM)	0	1	0	1
15	Orkney	0	0	3	3
16	Sark	0	0	1	1
Totals (16 entries)		41	40	39	120

== Results ==
=== Men ===
Event	Gold		Silver		Bronze	
ISSF 10m Air Pistol	Nemo Tabur (Saaremaa)	235.1	Matthew Reed (IOW)	228.9	Daniel Louis Payas (GIB)	210.6
ISSF 10m Air Pistol Team	Isle of Wight; Perron Phipps; Matthew Reed	1117	Gibraltar; Jonathan David Patron; Daniel Louis Payas	1116	Gotland; Pontus Nordgren; Mattias Steffenburg	1100
ISSF 10m Air Rifle	Oscar Eriksson (Gotland)	232.7	Paul Guillou (GGY)	230.7	David Turner (JEY)	209.8
ISSF 50m Free Pistol	Jonathan David Patron (GIB)	526	Matthew Reed (IOW)	525	Daniel Louis Payas (GIB)	524
ISSF 50m Free Pistol Team	Gotland; Pontus Nordgren; Mattias Steffenburg	1045	Isle of Wight; Perron Phipps; Matthew Reed	1009	Jersey; Gregory Guida; Michael Quenault	999
ISSF 25m Standard Pistol	Nemo Tabur (Saaremaa)	563	Jonathan David Patron (GIB)	534	Olof Widing (Gotland)	533
ISSF 25m Standard Pistol Team	Gotland; Bengt Hyytiäinen; Peter Nordgren	1084	Gibraltar; Jonathan David Patron; Daniel Louis Payas	1033	Hitra Municipality; Roy Aune; Jørgen Olsen	1022
ISSF 25m Centrefire	Fredrik Stenström (Gotland)	565	Nemo Tabur (Saaremaa)	564	Pedro Portella Salord (Menorca)	543
ISSF 25m Centrefire Team	Åland Islands; Fredrik Blomqvist; Harry Pettersson	1089	Isle of Man; Martin Cowley; Roger Winskill	1074	Jersey; Gregory Guida; Michael Quenault	1065
ISSF 50m Prone Smallbore Rifle	Andrew Chapman (JEY)	242.4	Björn Ahlby (Gotland)	239.9	Pedro Portella Salord (Menorca)	218.4
ISSF 50m Prone Smallbore Rifle Team	Gibraltar; Enrique Luis Bonifacio; Wayne John Piri	1210.4	Jersey; Stephen Bouchard; Andrew Chapman	1209.6	Orkney; Donald Sinclair; Robert Spence	1207
ISSF 25m Rapid Fire	Nemo Tabur (Saaremaa)	556	Fredrik Stenström (Gotland)	526	Jørgen Olsen (Hitra)	501
ISSF 25m Rapid Fire Team	Hitra Municipality; Roy Aune; Jørgen Olsen	1033	Gotland; Peter Nordgren; Olof Widing	998	Åland Islands; Mikael Johansson; Harry Pettersson	961
ISSF 50m 3 Position Smallbore Rifle	Simon Henry (Saint Helena)	430	Björn Ahlby (Gotland)	426.1	Robert Spence (Orkney)	412.4
ISSF 50m 3 Position Smallbore Rifle Team	Gotland; Björn Ahlby; Lars-Olof Larsson	1116				
NSRA 100 Yards Prone Rifle	Simon Henry (Saint Helena)	573	Lars-Olof Larsson (Gotland)	572	Dominic Cowen (IOW)	572
NSRA 100 Yards Prone Rifle Team	Guernsey; Matthew Guille; Lee Roussel	1153	Gibraltar; Enrique Luis Bonifacio; Wayne John Piri	1144	Orkney; Donald Sinclair; Robert Spence	1139

=== Women ===
Event	Gold		Silver		Bronze	
ISSF 10m Air Pistol	Cecilia Lund (ALA)	222.2	Shelley Moss (IOW)	217.8	Sasha Alexdottir (GIB)	203
ISSF 10m Air Pistol Team	Isle of Wight; Imogen Moss; Shelley Moss	714	Gibraltar; Sasha Alexdottir; Bettina Manner	700	Guernsey; Rebecca Margetts; Nikki Trebert	690
ISSF 10am Air Rifle	Frida Eriksson (Gotland)	245.1	Amanda Glansholm (Gotland)	244.1	Elin Liewendahl (ALA)	220.2
ISSF 25m Sport Pistol	Imogen Moss (IOW)	556	Shelley Moss (IOW)	551	Mary Norman (JEY)	540
ISSF 25m Sport Pistol Team	Isle of Wight; Imogen Moss; Shelley Moss	1103	Guernsey; Rebecca Margetts; Nikki Trebert	1077	Gibraltar; Sasha Alexdottir; Bettina Manner	1069
ISSF 50m Prone Smallbore Rifle	Sarah Campion (JEY)	598.4	Susan De Gruchy (JEY)	588.6	Frida Eriksson (Gotland)	584.3
ISSF 50m Prone Smallbore Rifle Team	Jersey; Sarah Campion; Susan De Gruchy	1202	Gotland; Frida Eriksson; Amanda Glansholm	1183	Saint Helena; Madolyn Andrews; Jodie Scipio-Constantine	1180
ISSF 50m 3 Position Smallbore Rifle	Frida Eriksson (Gotland)	424.4	Madolyn Andrews (Saint Helena)	414.3		
NSRA 100m Yards Prone Rifle	Sarah Campion (JEY)	569	Susan De Gruchy (JEY)	563	Natalie Jade Piri (GIB)	560
NSRA 100 Yards Prone Rifle Team	Jersey; Sarah Campion; Susan De Gruchy	1158	Gotland; Jehnny Gardelin; Amanda Glansholm	1111	Saint Helena; Madolyn Andrews; Jodie Scipio-Constantine	1108
ISSF 25m Standard Pistol	Nikki Trebert (GGY)	531	Shelley Moss (IOW)	527	Mary Norman (JEY)	508
ISSF 25m Standard Pistol Team	Isle of Wight; Imogen Moss; Shelley Moss	1013	Guernsey; Rebecca Margetts; Nikki Trebert	993	Gotland; Katarina Rosengren; Eva Widing	985

=== Open ===
Event	Gold		Silver		Bronze	
ISSF 10m Air Rifle Team	Gotland; Frida Eriksson; Erica Karlsson	1205.4	Jersey; Jonathan Bouchard; David Turner	1185.5	Gibraltar; Stephanie Piri; Mairead Lourdes Anne Sheriff	1184.1
Olympic Skeet Individual	John Magnus Laurenson (Shetland)	43	Fredrik Melin (Gotland)	43	Tórur Fløtt (FRO)	29
Olympic Skeet Team	Faroe Islands; Sámal Eyðstein Debes; Tórur Fløtt	170	Cayman Islands; Edison McLean; Andrew Schim	158	Gotland; Carl-Göran Hederstedt; Jonny Lindstedt	155
Automatic Ball Trap Individual	James Sawyer (GIB)	131	Juan Manuel Bagur Bosch (Menorca)	131	Christopher Jackson (CAY)	130
Automatic Ball Trap Team	Gibraltar; Harry Murphy; James Sawyer	166	Menorca; Juan Manuel Bagur Bosch; Sebastià Bosch Moll	164	Sark; Nicholas John Dewe; Stefan Roberts	157

=== Other ===
Event	Gold		Silver		Bronze	
25m Black Powder Revolver	Stefan Nyberg (Gotland)	91	Fredrik Blomqvist (ALA)	86	Magnus Wolff (Gotland)	86
IPSC Standard Division	Kent Westerlund (Gotland)	530.4077	William Campney (CAY)	473.5935	James Daly (JEY)	418.9165
IPSC Standard Division Team	Gotland; John Johansson; Kent Wsterlund	938.9877	Cayman Islands; William Campney; Ales Cevela	876.9999	Jersey; Tobias Cabaret; James Daly	770.8083
IPSC Open Division	Ivan Lundgren (Gotland)	533.6345	Stephen Borge (GIB)	402.1684	William Campney (CAY)	367.5943
IPSC Open Division Team	Gotland; Ivan Lundgren; Håkan Othberg	864.0481	Cayman Islands; William Campney; Ales Cevela	712.6076	Gibraltar; Mario Apap; Stephen Borge	643.7331
ISSF 300m Centre Fire Prone Rifle	Björn Ahlby (Gotland)	587	Dominic Cowen (IOW)	581	Lars-Olof Larsson (Gotland)	576
ISSF 300m Centre Fire Prone Rifle Team	Gotland; Lars-Olof Larsson; Håkan Pettersson	1160	Isle of Wight; Dominic Cowen; Michael Jenvey	1131	Jersey; Bruce Horwood; Deborah Thompson	1127
