= Archery at the 2017 Games of the Small States of Europe =

Archery at the 2017 Games of the Small States of Europe was held in Montecchio Stadium in San Marino from 30 May to 2 June 2017.

== Medal table ==
Rank	Nation	Gold	Silver	Bronze	Total
1	Luxembourg (LUX)	4	4	1	9
2	Cyprus (CYP)	3	3	2	8
3	Iceland (ISL)	1	0	3	4
4	San Marino (SMR)*	0	1	0	1
5	Liechtenstein (LIE)	0	0	1	1
5	Montenegro (MNE)	0	0	1	1
Totals (6 entries)		8	8	8	24

== Medal summary ==
=== Recurve ===
Event	Gold	Silver	Bronze
Men's individual	Luxembourg; Jeff Henckels	Luxembourg; Joe Klein	Luxembourg; Pit Klein
Women's individual	Cyprus; Elena Mousikou	Cyprus; Anna Kallenou	Cyprus; Mikaella Kourouna
Men's team	Luxembourg; Jeff Henckels; Joe Klein; Pit Klein	Cyprus; Mimis El Helali; Fotios Fotiou; Constantinos Panagi	Iceland; Guðmundur Örn Guðjónsson; Haraldur Gústafsson; Sigurjón Atli Sigurðsson
Mixed team	Cyprus; Elena Mousikou; Constantinos Panagi	Luxembourg; Carmen Beaudeux; Jeff Henckels	Montenegro; Mina Sibalic; Milan Borović

=== Compound ===
Event	Gold	Silver	Bronze
Men's individual	Cyprus; Diomidis Dimitradis	Luxembourg; Gilles Seywert	Liechtenstein; Stefan Zacharias
Women's individual	Iceland; Helga Kolbrún Magnúsdóttir	Luxembourg; Isabel Dias	Iceland; Margrét Einarsdóttir
Men's team	Luxembourg; Timo Bega; Eric Frantz; Gilles Seywert	San Marino; Fabrizio Belloni; Giovanni Paolo Bonelli; Leonardo Giorgi	Cyprus; Constantinos Christodoulou; Diomidis Dimitriadis; Dimitrios Kargados
Mixed team	Luxembourg; Isabel Dias; Timo Bega	Cyprus; Sophia Tsangari; Diomidis Dimitriadis	Iceland; Helga Kolbrún Magnúsdóttir; Carsten Tarnow
