= Esther Barrugués =

Andorran sport shooter

Personal information
- Nationality: Andorran
- Born: 16 May 1980 (age 46)
- Height: 164 cm (5 ft 5 in)
- Weight: 60 kg (132 lb)

Sport
- Sport: Sports shooting
Medal record
Women's Shooting
Representing Andorra
Games of the Small States of Europe
Bronze medal – third place	2011 Liechtenstein	10 m air rifle

Esther Barrugués Alviñá (born 16 May 1980) is an Andorran sports shooter. She competed in the women's 10 metre air rifle event at the 2016 Summer Olympics where she finished in 51st place.
