= Mark Littleton =

American racing driver

- Born: August 8, 1970 (age 56); Arenzville, Illinois, U.S.

ARCA Menards Series career
- 16 races run over 9 years
- Best finish: 65th (2014)
- First race: 2007 Allen Crowe 100 (Springfield)
- Last race: 2015 Southern Illinois 100 (DuQuoin)
Wins	Top tens	Poles
0	0	0
- Statistics up to date as of January 22, 2025.

Mark Littleton (born August 8, 1970) is an American professional former stock car racing driver who has previously competed in the ARCA Racing Series from 2007 to 2015.

== Motorsports results ==
=== ARCA Racing Series ===
(key) (Bold – Pole position awarded by qualifying time. Italics – Pole position earned by points standings or practice time. * – Most laps led.)

ARCA Racing Series results
Year	Team	No.	Make	1	2	3	4	5	6	7	8	9	10	11	12	13	14	15	16	17	18	19	20	21	22	23	ARSC	Pts	Ref
2007	Middleton Racing	44	Chevy	DAY	USA	NSH	SLM	KAN	WIN	KEN	TOL	IOW	POC	MCH	BLN	KEN	POC	NSH	ISF; 28	MIL	GTW	DSF; 19	CHI	SLM	TAL	TOL	97th	225	
2008	Middleton Racing	96	Chevy	DAY	SLM	IOW	KAN	CAR	KEN	TOL	POC	MCH	CAY	KEN	BLN	POC	NSH	ISF; 19	DSF; 40	CHI	SLM	NJE	TAL	TOL			111th	160	
2009	Middleton Racing	5	Chevy	DAY	SLM	CAR	TAL	KEN	TOL	POC	MCH	MFD	IOW	KEN	BLN	POC	ISF; 18	CHI	TOL	DSF; 20	NJE	SLM	KAN	CAR			86th	270	
2010	Middleton Racing	5	Chevy	DAY	PBE	SLM	TEX	TAL	TOL	POC	MCH	IOW	MFD	POC	BLN	NJE	ISF; 17	CHI	DSF; 21	TOL	SLM	KAN	CAR				71st	270	
2011	Middleton Racing	5	Chevy	DAY	TAL	SLM	TOL	NJE	CHI	POC	MCH	WIN	BLN	IOW	IRP	POC	ISF; 15	MAD	DSF; 20	SLM	KAN	TOL					74th	285	
2012	Middleton Racing	5	Chevy	DAY	MOB	SLM	TAL	TOL	ELK	POC	MCH	WIN	NJE	IOW	CHI	IRP	POC	BLN	ISF; 17	MAD	SLM	DSF	KAN				111th	145	
2013	Middleton Racing	7	Chevy	DAY	MOB	SLM	TAL	TOL	ELK	POC	MCH	ROA	WIN	CHI	NJM	POC	BLN	ISF; 27	MAD								93rd	230	
2013	Middleton Racing	5	Chevy																	DSF; 17	IOW	SLM	KEN	KAN			93rd	230	
2014	Middleton Racing	5	Chevy	DAY	MOB	SLM	TAL	TOL	NJE	POC	MCH	ELK	WIN	CHI	IRP	POC	BLN	ISF; 17	MAD	DSF; 24	SLM	KEN	KAN				65th	255	
2015	Middleton Racing	5	Chevy	DAY	MOB	NSH	SLM	TAL	TOL	NJE	POC	MCH	CHI	WIN	IOW	IRP	POC	BLN	ISF; 14	DSF; 24	SLM	KEN	KAN				83rd	270	
