= Olivia Hofmann =

Austrian sports shooter (born 1992)

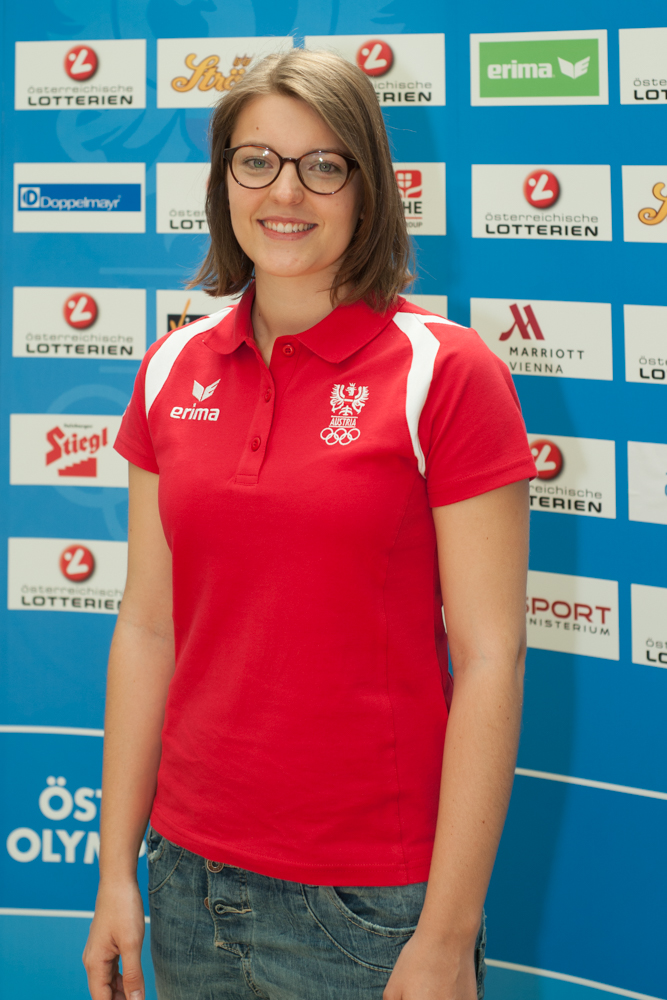
- Hofmann in 2016

Personal information
- Nationality: Austrian
- Born: 8 August 1992 (age 33) Innsbruck, Austria
- Height: 1.63 m (5 ft 4 in)
- Weight: 57 kg (126 lb)

Sport
- Country: Austria
- Sport: Sports shooting
- Event: Air rifle
- Club: SG-Hoetting
Medal record
World Championships
Silver medal – second place	2018 Changwon	300 m team rifle 3 positions
European Championships
Gold medal – first place	2025 Châteauroux	50 m Rifle Prone Team
Bronze medal – third place	2017 Baku	50m rifle prone team

Olivia Hofmann (born 8 August 1992) is an Austrian sports shooter. She competed in the women's 10 metre air rifle event at the 2016 Summer Olympics.
