= Shooting at the 2015 Games of the Small States of Europe =

Sports

Shooting at the 2015 Games of the Small States of Europe was held from 2–4 June 2015.

== Medal table ==
* Host nation (Iceland)

Rank	Nation	Gold	Silver	Bronze	Total
1	Monaco (MON)	2	0	1	3
2	Iceland (ISL)*	1	4	2	7
3	Liechtenstein (LIE)	1	1	0	2
3	Luxembourg (LUX)	1	1	0	2
5	Cyprus (CYP)	1	0	2	3
6	Malta (MLT)	0	0	1	1
Totals (6 entries)		6	6	6	18

== Men ==
Event	Gold		Silver		Bronze	
Air Pistol	Boris Jeremenko (MON)	193.6	Ívar Ragnarsson (ISL)	190.7	Thomas Viderö (ISL)	171.7
Air Rifle	Marc-Andre Kessler (LIE)	198.8	Michael Mattle (LIE)	197.9	William Vella (MLT)	174.2
Prone Rifle	Eric Lanza (MON)	205.0	Jón Þór Sigurðsson (ISL)	203.5	Guðmundur Helgi Christensen (ISL)	182.4
Skeet	Georgios Kazakos (CYP)		Örn Valdimarsson (ISL)		Stefanos Nikolaidis (CYP)	

== Women ==
Event	Gold		Silver		Bronze	
Air Pistol	Sylvie Schmit (LUX)	191.8	Jórunn Harðardóttir (ISL)	188.5	Carine Canestrelli (MON)	168.7
Air Rifle	Iris Eva Einarsdóttir (ISL)	200.1	Carole Calmes (LUX)	196.7	Marilena Constantinou (CYP)	176.8
