= Nina Balaban =

Macedonian sports shooter

Personal information
- Born: 2 November 1995 (age 30) Ohrid, Macedonia

Sport
- Sport: Sports shooting

Nina Balaban (Macedonian: Нина Балабан; born 2 November 1995) is a Macedonian sports shooter. She competed in the women's 10 metre air rifle event at the 2016 Summer Olympics.
