= Shooting at the 2017 Games of the Small States of Europe =

Sport shooting at the 2017 Games of the Small States of Europe was held at the Tiro a Volo San Marino Via dei Cerri and Shooting Area Via Genghe di Atto 143 in San Marino on 30 May and 2 June 2017.

== Medal table ==
Rank	Nation	Gold	Silver	Bronze	Total
1	Cyprus	3	2	2	7
2	Luxembourg	1	2	1	4
2	Malta	1	2	1	4
4	San Marino*	1	1	1	3
5	Iceland	1	0	0	1
6	Monaco	0	0	1	1
6	Montenegro	0	0	1	1
Totals (7 entries)		7	7	7	21

== Medalists ==
=== Men ===
Event	Gold	Silver	Bronze
10m Air Pistol	Asgeir Sigurgeirsson; Iceland	Joe Dondelinger; Luxembourg	Boris Jeremenko; Monaco
10m Air Rifle	Alexandros Christoforou; Cyprus	Michel Kantzenmeier; Luxembourg	Andreas Constatinou; Cyprus
Trap	Manuel Mancini; San Marino	Francis Pace; Malta	Gian Marco Berti; San Marino
Double Trap	Gianluca Chetcuti; Malta	Leontios Leontiou; Cyprus	Djovanis Savvides; Cyprus
Skeet	Andreas Chasikos; Cyprus	Christian Costa; San Marino	Bozhidar Vasilev Dimitrov; Malta

=== Women ===
Event	Gold	Silver	Bronze
10m Air Pistol	Panagiota Charalampous; Cyprus	Eleanor Bezzina; Malta	Catheline Dessoy; Luxembourg
10m Air Rifle	Carole Calmes; Luxembourg	Marilena Constatinou; Cyprus	Andela Milikovic; Montenegro
