= Tatjana Đekanović =

Bosnian sports shooter

Personal information
- Born: 25 February 1997 (age 29) Banja Luka, Bosnia and Herzegovina

Sport
- Sport: Shooting
- Event: Air rifle

Tatjana Đekanović (born 25 February 1997) is a Bosnian sports shooter. She competed in the women's 10 metre air rifle event at the 2016 Summer Olympics and the women's 10 metre air rifle event at the 2020 Summer Olympics. She came 35th out of 51 competitors in the 10m competition.

She started shooting in the sixth grade of elementary school, and is a member of the Geofon Shooting Club in Teslić. Interviewed before the Rio Olympics she said that she hoped that the government's attitude to sports would change so that sports were better supported. Her participation in the World Cup at Baku ahead of the Olympics was funded by Teslić municipality and a local company, "M:tel", because there was no state funding.

== Personal life ==
Đekanović was born in Banja Luka, and grew up in the town of Teslic. She graduated from high school in 2016.

== Athletic career ==
Đekanović began practicing shooting in 2009, and began competing in 2011.

In 2015, she won Teslic's Athlete of the Year Award for her 2014 performances.

In January 2015, Đekanović competed in Kuwait as part of Bosnia and Herzegovina's national shooting team.

In May 2015, Đekanović was confirmed to be on Bosnia and Herzegovina's 2016 Olympic team. In 2016, Đekanović was the youngest athlete to represent Bosnia and Herzegovina at the Summer Olympics in Rio. At the time, she was considered the 110th best shooter in the world. She came in 35th in the women's 10 metre air rifle event, scoring 410.8 points in total.

In 2018, announced she would not be competing at the 2019 ISSF World Cup in India, due to lack of funds. However, she was able to attend the portion of the 2019 ISSF World Cup held in Munich, where sheset a new record for Bosnia and Herzegovina of 625.4 points. She came in 58th place out of a total 149 competitors.

The announcement that Đekanović would represent at the 2020 Summer Olympics caused some controversy, as fellow Bosnian shooter Segmedina Bjelošević was not picked, despite having higher scores at recent competitions. At the 2020 Summer Olympics in Tokyo, came in 47nd place in the women's 10 metre air rifle event, having scored 613.2 points. She was the first of Bosnia and Herzegovina's athletes to compete.

Đekanović is coached by Neven Rašić.
