= AirOShoot =

Invitational shooting competition in Europe

- Status: Active
- Genre: Shooting Sports
- Frequency: Annually
- Venue: Ivo Van Damme Sportshal, Herent, Belgium
- Years active: 7
- Established: 2019
- Most recent: 2019
- Area: Europe
- Major events: 10 metre air rifle; 10 metre air pistol
- Organiser: Stichting AirOShoot
- Website: www.airoshoot.eu
- 2023

AirOShoot is an invitational shooting competition held in Europe, but open to athletes of any nationality. Competitors qualify through a top-two finish at a participating European competition, or else by accumulating enough ranking points over the season to earn a quota spot.

== History ==
AirOShoot was founded as a partnership between four 10 metre air competitions in Europe. The founding aims of this partnership were to cooperate in raising the profile of the European "B" airgun competitions, and to fill the gap between National and major International (ISSF and ESC) competitions. In the longer term, it was also intended to provide resources and expertise for start-up competitions.

The first Super Final was held in 2019. No finals were held in 2020, 2021 or 2022 due to travel restrictions and limited participation. Some events did not run in 2022 as it was not clear in 2021 when restrictions would be lifted. For the 2023 cycle the number of participating competitions grew to six, with the Super Final announced for November 2023.

== Qualification ==
Qualification is through one of two mechanisms:

- Direct - Finish in the top two at a participating competition
- Earn enough ranking points to finish in the top-4 ranked athletes who have not earned a place directly

The current participating competitions include:

- Gundsølille MEGAlink Open (Denmark)
- InterShoot (the Netherlands)
- Scottish Target Shooting (Scotland)
- IRS Cup (Belgium)
- Welsh Airgun Open (Wales)
- RIAC (Luxembourg)

== Results ==
Super Final Champions
| Year | Event | Senior Men | Senior women | Junior Men | Junior Women |
|---|---|---|---|---|---|
| 2019 | Rifle | Christian Brenneisen (GER) | Sharon Mekking (HOL) | Jacob Hill (GBR) | Tiphaine Blondeau (BEL) |
| 2019 | Pistol | Waldek Mickiewicz (GBR) | Lieselotte Janssen (BEL) | James Millar (WAL) | Emilia Faulkner (SCO) |
| 2023 | Rifle | (25x17px) | (25x17px) | (25x17px) | (25x17px) |
| 2023 | Pistol | (25x17px) | (25x17px) | (25x17px) | (25x17px) |
