= Shooting at the 2013 Games of the Small States of Europe =

Shooting at the 2013 Games of the Small States of Europe was held from 28–31 May 2013 at Differdange and Limpertsberg, Luxembourg.

== Medal summary ==
=== Medal table ===
* Host nation (Luxembourg)

Rank	Nation	Gold	Silver	Bronze	Total
1	Cyprus	2	1	0	3
2	Iceland	1	2	1	4
3	Liechtenstein	1	1	0	2
4	Malta	1	0	0	1
5	Monaco	0	1	0	1
6	Luxembourg*	0	0	3	3
7	San Marino	0	0	1	1
Totals (7 entries)		5	5	5	15

=== Men ===
Event	Gold		Silver		Bronze	
Air Pistol	Tomas Videro (ISL)	201.7	Ásgeir Sigurgeirsson (ISL)	197.4	Paolo Cecchini (SMR)	172.7
Air Rifle	Marc-Andre Kessler (LIE)	201.3	Eric Lanza (MON)	195.9	Gudmundur Christensen (ISL)	172.5
Trap	Adonis Mylonas (CYP)		Marios Sophocleous (CYP)		Lyndon Sosa (LUX)	

=== Women ===
Event	Gold		Silver		Bronze	
Air Pistol	Eleanor Bezzina (MLT)	191.2	Jorunn Hardardóttir (ISL)	187.6	Nancy Jans (LUX)	165.7
Air Rifle	Artemis Panteli (CYP)	203.3	Julia Berginz (LIE)	199.7	Carole Calmes (LUX)	178.1
