= Shooting at the 2015 Island Games =

Shooting, for the 2015 Island Games, takes place at the Crabbe Fullbore, Les Landes, Lecq ABT and Lecq Skeet ranges in Jersey. Competition took place from 27 June to 3 July 2015.

== Medal table ==
* Host nation (Jersey)

Rank	Nation	Gold	Silver	Bronze	Total
1	Jersey (JEY)*	20	15	4	39
2	Gotland (Gotland)	11	5	6	22
3	Isle of Man (IOM)	7	6	10	23
4	Isle of Wight (IOW)	5	8	7	20
5	Guernsey (GGY)	5	5	10	20
6	Gibraltar (GIB)	3	3	3	9
7	Hitra Municipality	2	3	4	9
8	Cayman Islands (CAY)	2	3	3	8
9	Menorca	2	3	0	5
10	Faroe Islands (FRO)	2	0	0	2
11	Åland (ALA)	1	6	3	10
12	Sark	1	1	2	4
13	Saaremaa	1	0	0	1
14	Bermuda (BER)	0	1	0	1
14	Falkland Islands	0	1	0	1
16	Orkney	0	0	2	2
16	Shetland	0	0	2	2
18	Saint Helena	0	0	1	1
18	Western Isles (WES)	0	0	1	1
Totals (19 entries)		62	60	58	180

Source: Jersey 2015 Shooting Medal Tally

== Medal summary ==
=== Men's events ===
Event	Gold		Silver		Bronze	
ISSF 10m Air Pistol	Pontus Nordgren (Gotland)	188.7	Jonathan Patron (GIB)	181.9	Nathan Holden (IOM)	160.6
ISSF 10m Air Pistol Team	Gotland; Peter Nordgren; Pontus Nordgren	1125	Isle of Wight; Perron Phipps; Matthew Reed	1094	Åland Islands; Fredrik Blomqvist; Tomas Mörn	1091
ISSF 10m Air Rifle	Paul Guillou (GGY)	197.5	David Turner (JEY)	197.1	Björn Ahlby (Gotland)	177.1
ISSF 10m Air Rifle Team	Åland Islands; Tom Mattsson; Mathias Nordberg	1195.3	Jersey; Peter Le Marinel; David Turner	1190.2	Guernsey; Paul Guillou; Lee Roussel	1186.2
ISSF 50m Free Pistol	Matthew Reed (IOW)	526	Jacek Hanca (GGY)	513	Pontus Nordgren (Gotland)	512
ISSF 50m Free Pistol Team	Gotland; Peter Nordgen; Pontus Nordgren	1036	Åland Islands; Fredrik Blomqvist; Tomas Mörn	1021	Guernsey; Eric De Saumarez; Jacek Hanca	1019
ISSF 25m Centrefire	Jacek Hanca (GGY)	556	Lorenzo Marques Llorens (Menorca)	554	Roy Aune (Hitra)	541
ISSF 25m Centrefire Team	Gotland; Bengt Hyytiäinen; Olof Widing	1120	Hitra Municipality; Roy Aune; Jorgen Olsen	1075	Guernsey; Eric De Saumarez; Jacek Hanca	1069
ISSF 50m Prone Smallbore Rifle	Mike Duncalf (IOM)	199.3	Wayne Piri (GIB)	198	Dominic Cowen (IOW)	176.7
ISSF 50m Prone Smallbore Rifle Team	Isle of Man; Mike Duncalf; Andy Potter	1222.8	Isle of Wight; Dominic Cowen; Richard Wilson	1221.7	Orkney; Donald Sinclair; Robert Spence	1217.9
ISSF 25m Rapid Fire	George Winstanley (JEY)	530	Jorgen Olsen (Hitra)	520	Harry Pettersson (ALA)	510
ISSF 25m Rapid Fire Team	Jersey; Michael Quenault; George Winstanley	1026	Gotland; Peter Nordgren; Olof Widing	108	Hitra Municipality; Roy Aune; Jorgen Olsen	978
ISSF 50m 3 Position Smallbore Rifle	Meelis Saar (Saaremaa)	423.1	Björn Ahlby (Gotland)	419	Mathias Norderg (ALA)	405.2
ISSF 50m 3 Position Smallbore Rifle Team	Gotland; Björn Ahlby; Lars-Olof Larsson	2178	Åland Islands; Max Matsson; Mathias Nordberg	2133	Isle of Wight; Dominic Cowen; Richard Wilson	2099
NSRA 100 Yards Prone Rifle	Andrew Chapman (JEY)	579	Wayne Piri (GIB)	579	Björn Ahlby (Gotland)	577
NSRA 100 Yards Prone Rifle Team	Gibraltar; Albert Buhagiar; Wayne Piri	1144	Isle of Man; Mike Duncalf; Andy Potter	1136	Orkney; Donald Sinclair; Robert Spence	1130
English Sport Individual	Jonathan De La Haye (JEY)	86	Mark Andres]] (JEY)	86	Mark Kneen (IOM)	85
English Sport Team	Jersey; Mark Andrews; Andrew De La Haye; Jonathan De La Haye	177	Isle of Wight; Dan Bishop; Mark Downer; Lee Pitman	173	Guernsey; Andrew Ashplant; James Ashplant; John Wild	172
Sport Trap Individual	Jonathan De La Haye (JEY)	90	Dan Bishop (IOW)	89	Andrew Ashplant (GGY)	87
Sport Trap Team	Jersey; Iain Barette; Jonathan De La Haye	173	Isle of Wight; Dan Bishop; Mark Downer; Lee Pitman	171	Isle of Man; Jack Kneen; Martin Kneen; Paul Mihailovits	157

=== Women's events ===
Event	Gold		Silver		Bronze	
ISSF 10m Air Pistol	Nicola Holmes (JEY)	183.9	Mary Norman (JEY)	180.1	Rachel Exon (IOM)	161.8
ISSF 10m Air Pistol Team	Jersey; Nicola Holmes; Mary Norman	732	Guernsey; Rebecca Margetts; Nikki Trebert	701	Isle of Wight; Imogen Moss; Shelley Moss	696
ISSF 10m Air Rifle	Frida Eriksson (Gotland)	202.4	Jemma Toms (IOW)	200.9	Stephanie Piri (GIB)	176.7
ISSF 10m Air Rifle Team	Gotland; Frida Eriksson; Jehnny Gardelin	791.4	Åland Islands; Elin Liewendahl; Maria Liewendahl	788.2	Isle of Man; Rachel Glover; Tracey Skelton	762.9
ISSF 25m Sport Pistol	Nicola Holmes (JEY)		Michaela Pultr (CAY)		Nikki Trebert (GGY)	
ISSF 25m Sport Pistol Team	Jersey; Nicola Holmes; Mary Norman	1099	Guernsey; Rebecca Margetts; Nikki Trebert	1054	Gibraltar; Sasha Alexdottir; Arianna Cerisola	968
ISSF 50m Prone Smallbore Rifle	Jehnny Gardelin (Gotland)	596.2	Adrienne Smatt (Bermuda)	595.3	Jemma Toms (IOW)	595.1
ISSF 50m Prone Smallbore Rifle Team	Isle of Man; Rachel Glover; Tracey Skelton	1203	Jersey; Sarah Campion; Susan De Gruchy	1196.1	Saint Helena; Madolyn Andrews; Chelsea Benjamin	1192.6
ISSF 50m 3 Position Smallbore Rifle	Jemma Toms (IOW)	426.7	Rachel Glover (IOM)	417.4	Jehnny Gardelin (Gotland)	404.7
ISSF 50m 3 Position Smallbore Rifle Team	Gotland; Frida Eriksson; Jehnny Gardelin	1035				
NSRA 100 Yards Prone Rifle	Natalie Piri (GIB)	558	Rachel Glover (IOM)	558	Tracey Skelton (IOM)	556
NSRA 100 Yards Prone Rifle Team	Isle of Man; Rachel Glover; Tracey Skelton	1129	Jersey; Sarah Campion; Susan De Gruchy	1114	Gotland; Frida Eriksson; Jehnny Gardelin	1103
English Sporting Individual	Caroline De La Haye (JEY)	74	Katherine Bright (IOW)	66	Sharon Morris (IOW)	66
English Sporting Team	Isle of Wight; Katherine Bright; Jennie Cartwright; Sharon Morris	155				
Sport Trap Individual	Katherine Bright (IOW)	85	Jennie Cartwright (IOW)	78	Caroline De La Haye (JEY)	77
Sport Trap Team	Isle of Wight; Katherine Bright; Jennie Cartwright; Sharon Morris	132				

=== Open events ===
Event	Gold		Silver		Bronze	
ISSF 25m Standard Pistol	Jonathon Patron (GIB)	541	Olof Widing (Gotland)	539	Matthew Reed (IOW)	524
ISSF 25m Standard Pistol Team	Gotland; Bengt Hyytiäinen; Peter Nordgren	1066	Hitra Municipality; Roy Aune; Jorgen Olsen	1060	Gibraltar; Jonathon Patron; Daniel Payas	1024
Police Pistol 1	Jorgen Olsen (Hitra)	295	Mark Littleton (JEY)	293	Andy Torode (GGY)	293
Police Pistol 1 Team	Guernsey; James Straughan; Andy Torode	578	Falkland Islands; Graham Didlick; David Peck	577	Hitra Municipality; Roy Aune; Jorgen Olsen	575
Police Pistol 2	Mark Littleton (JEY)	564	Geoff Mitchell (IOM)	560	Andy Torode (GGY)	558
Police Pistol 2 Team	Guernsey; James Straughan; Andy Torode	1142	Jersey; Michael Flynn; Mark Littleton	1125	Isle of Man; Geoff Mitchell; Richard Weir	1112
Service Pistol B	Andy Torode (GGY)	111	Mark Littleton (JEY)	106	Jorgen Olsen (Hitra)	105
Service Pistol B Team	Hitra Municipality; Roy Aune; Jorgen Olsen	199	Jersey; Francis Devonald; Mark Littleton	198	Guernsey; James Straughan; Andy Torode	195
NRA 1500 PPC	Mark Littleton (JEY)	1463	Olof Widing (Gotland)	1430	Francis Devonald (JEY)	1425
NRA 1500 PPC Team	Jersey; Francis Devonald; Mark Littleton	2868	Guernsey; James Straughan; Andy Torode	2856	Isle of Man; Geoff Mitchell; Richard Weir	2759
Universal Trap Individual	Christopher Jackson (CAY)	136	Juan Manuel Bagur (Menorca)	136	Stefan Roberts (Sark)	135
Universal Trap Team	Sark; Nicholas Dewe; Stefan Roberts	183	Menorca; Juan Manuel Bagur Bosch; Sebastià Bosch Moll	177	Guernsey; Darren Burtenshaw; Alex Williams	171
English Skeet Individual	Mark Andrews (JEY)	144	Iain Barette (JEY)	144	Jeff Corkill (IOM)	144
English Skeet Team	Jersey; Mark Andrews; Iain Barette	192	Isle of Man; Jeff Corkill; Stan Cross	191	Isle of Wight; Gareth Joseph; Benjamin Morris	186
Olympic Skeet Individual	Marius F. Joensen (FRO)		Lennart Åkerblom (ALA)		John Magnus Laurenson (Shetland)	
Olympic Skeet Team	Faroe Islands; Sámal Eyðstein Debes; Marius F. Joensen	174	Åland Islands; Lennart Åkerblom; Lars Helsing	167	Shetland; John Magnus Laurenson; Bryan Sutherland	164
Automatic Ball Trap Individual	Juan Manuel Bagur Bosch (Menorca)	135	Nicholas Dewe (Sark)	131	Christopher Jackson (CAY)	130
Automatic Ball Trap Team	Menorca; Juan Manuel Bagur Bosch; Sebastià Bosch Moll	166	Cayman Islands; Christopher Jackson; Kevin Schirn	162	Sark; Nicholas Dewe; Stefan Roberts	160

=== Other events ===
Event	Gold		Silver		Bronze	
25m Black Powder Revolver	Phil Newman (IOM)	92	Peter Nordgren (Gotland)	92	Michael Radcliffe (JEY)	90
25m Black Powder Revolver Team	Gotland; Peter Nordgren; Stefan Nyberg	182	Åland Islands; Fredrik Blomqvist; Tomas Mörn; Jersey; Mark Littleton; Michael Radcliffe	178		
IPSC Standard Division	Andrew McBean (CAY)	689.6919	Tobias Cabaret (JEY)	650.3311	Hugo Yates (IOM)	619.3758
IPSC Standard Division Team	Jersey; Tobias Cabaret; James Daly	1253.3593	Isle of Man; Alastair Baldwin; Hugo Yates	1152.708	Cayman Islands; Chanda Glidden; Andrew McBean	1138.619
IPSC Open Division	Geoff Mitchell (IOM)	688.9548	Andrew McBean (CAY)	665.7629	Alain Cabaret (JEY)	581.4444
IPSC Open Division Team	Isle of Man; Vernon Donnelly; Geoff Mitchell	1199.4438	Jersey; Alain Cabaret; Michael Nolan	1062.3701	Cayman Islands; Chanda Glidden; Andrew McBean	1037.1071
Fullbore Queens	Andrew Le Cheminant (JEY)	387-41v	Barry Le Cheminant (JEY)	385-41v	Lars-Olof Larsson (Gotland)	377-31v
Fullbore Queens Team	Jersey; Fabien Amy; Bruce Horwood	764-71v	Guernsey; Nicholas Branch; Rob Waters	760-67v		
