= Sarah Hornung =

Swiss sport shooter (born 1996)

Personal information
- Full name: Sarah Hornung
- Nationality: Switzerland
- Born: 18 April 1996 (age 30) Büren an der Aare, Switzerland
- Height: 1.51 m (4 ft 11 1/2 in)
- Weight: 43 kg (95 lb)

Sport
- Sport: Shooting
- Event: 10 m air rifle (AR40)
- Club: SC Bueren an der Aare
- Coached by: Roger Chassat
Medal record
Women's shooting
Representing Switzerland
Summer Youth Olympics
Gold medal – first place	2014 Nanjing	AR40
European Games
Silver medal – second place	2015 Baku	AR40

Sarah Hornung (born April 14, 1996 in Büren an der Aare) is a Swiss sport shooter. She won a gold medal in the girls' 10 m air rifle at the 2014 Youth Olympic Games in Nanjing, China, and then collected a silver on her senior debut at the 2015 European Games in Baku, Azerbaijan, securing her a place on the Swiss shooting squad for the 2016 Summer Olympics in Rio de Janeiro. Hornung trains for the shooting team at the sport club Bueren an der Aare in her native Denges under her personal coach Roger Chassat.

Hornung started off her competitive shooting career at the 2014 Summer Youth Olympics in Nanjing, China, where she took home the gold medal in the girls' 10 m air rifle with an impressive score of 207.8, beating Singapore's Martina Veloso by a slight 0.6-point margin.

On her senior debut at the inaugural 2015 European Games in Baku, Azerbaijan, Hornung battled against the Serbian shooter and 2012 Olympian Andrea Arsović for the gold medal in the women's 10 m air rifle final, but narrowly missed a hit by a slimmest 0.1-point margin, ending up with a silver at a European junior record of 207.7. With Arsović having previously booked her Olympic place from the World Cup series, Hornung earned a spot for the Swiss squad and is expected to compete for the 2016 Summer Olympics in Rio de Janeiro.
