= Urata Rama =

Kosovan sports shooter

Personal information
- Born: 20 December 1986 (age 39)

Sport
- Sport: Sports shooting

Urata Rama (born 20 December 1986) is a Kosovar sports shooter and physical educator, who belongs to the Jeton Ramaj Shooting Club in Vitina and has participated at the Olympic level since 2003. In 2012, she was one of six athletes nominated by the Olympic Committee of Kosovo, but she was rejected for the 2012 Summer Olympics by the International Olympic Committee, which only accepted judoka Majlinda Kelmendi though as a representative of Albania. Rama, whose cousin Lumturie Rama also shoots competitively, competed at the 2015 European Games in Baku in the ISSF 10 meter air rifle, and went on to compete in the women's 10 metre air rifle event at the 2016 Summer Olympics.
