= Shooting at the 2013 Island Games =

Shooting, for the 2013 Island Games, took place at the Warwick Camp, the Finger, and Cooper's Island, Bermuda. Competition took place from 14 to 19 July 2013.

== Medal table ==
* Host nation (Bermuda)

Rank	Nation	Gold	Silver	Bronze	Total
1	Gotland	14	4	2	20
2	Jersey	3	5	6	14
3	Gibraltar	2	4	3	9
4	Guernsey	2	1	2	5
5	Faroe Islands	2	0	1	3
5	Menorca	2	0	1	3
7	Saint Helena	1	2	0	3
8	Bermuda*	1	1	1	3
9	Cayman Islands	0	3	1	4
10	Åland	0	1	3	4
11	Isle of Wight	0	1	0	1
12	Hitra Municipality	0	0	1	1
Totals (12 entries)		27	22	21	70

Source: Bermuda 2013 Shooting Medal Tally

== Medal summary ==
=== Men's events ===
Event	Gold		Silver		Bronze	
10 metre air pistol (ISSF)	Pontus Nordgren (Gotland)	552 (9)	Michael Quenault (Jersey)	552 (7)	Jonathan David Patron (GIB)	551
10 metre air rifle (ISSF)	Simon Paul Henry (Saint Helena)	567	Robin Leksäther (Gotland)	565	David Turner (Jersey)	558
25 metre centre fire (ISSF)	Bengt Hyytiäinen (Gotland)	562	Jonathan David Patron (GIB)	556	Louis Phillip Baglietto (GIB)	548
25 metre standard pistol (ISSF)	Pontus Nordgren (Gotland)	553	Daniel Payas (GIB)	526	Bengt Hyytiäinen (Gotland)	525 (6)
25 metre rapid fire (ISSF)	Peter Nordgren (Gotland)	562	George Winstanley (Jersey)	549 (10)	Michael Quenault (Jersey)	549 (5)
50 metre free pistol (ISSF)	Pontus Nordgren (Gotland)	518	Michael Quenault (Jersey)	499	Jørgen Olsen (Hitra)	494
50 metre prone smallbore rifle (ISSF)	Andrew Chapman (Jersey)	584	Dominic Cowen (Isle of Wight)	579	Ross Roberts (BER)	578
Individual automatic ball trap	Juan Manuel Bagur Bosch (Menorca)	123	Christopher Jackson (CAY)	121	Niklas Rehn (ALA)	108
Individual skeet (Olympic)	Marius F. Joensen (FRO)	130	Edison McLean (CAY)	129	Lennart Åkerblom (ALA)	128
10 metre air pistol team (ISSF)	Gibraltar; Louis Phillip Baglietto; Jonathan David Patron	1100	Gotland; Peter Nordgren; Pontus Nordgren	1097	Jersey; Michael Quenault; George Winstanley	1084
10 metre air rifle team (ISSF)	Gotland; Johnny Jonasson; Robin Leksäther	1121	Not awarded		Not awarded	
25 metre centre fire team (ISSF)	Gotland; Bengt Hyytiäinen; Olof Widing	1106	Gibraltar; Louis Phillip Baglietto; Jonathan David Patron	1061	Jersey; Christopher le Moeligou; Michael Quenault	1054
25 metre rapid fire team (ISSF)	Gotland; Peter Nordgren; Olof Widing	1095	Jersey; Michael Quenault; George Winstanley	1070	Gibraltar; Jonathan David Patron; Daniel Payas	1052
50 metre free pistol team (ISSF)	Gotland; Peter Nordgren; Pontus Nordgren	1002	Jersey; Michael Quenault; Mick Radcliffe	906	Åland Islands; Rune Karlsson; Jan Malmberg	859
50 metre prone smallbore rifle team (ISSF)	Gotland; Birger Johansson; Dick Weström	1130	Bermuda; Carl Reid; Ross Roberts	1130	Menorca; Tobias Pantke; Pedro Portella	1128
Team automatic ball trap	Menorca; Juan Manuel Bagur Bosch; Sebastian Bosch	157	Cayman Islands; Christopher Jackson; Kevin Schirn	150	Faroe Islands; Esmar Andreasen; Ragnar við Streym	137
Team skeet (Olympic)	Faroe Islands; Sámal Debes; Marius F. Joensen	167	Åland Islands; Lennart Åkerblom; Bengt-Olof Lindgren	158	Cayman Islands; Edison McLean; Kevin Schirn	146

=== Women's events ===
Event	Gold		Silver		Bronze	
10 metre air pistol (ISSF)	Nicola Holmes (Jersey)	358	Rebecca Margetts (GGY)	349	Eva Widing (Gotland)	349
10 metre air rifle (ISSF)	Heloise Manasco (GIB)	381	Not awarded		Not awarded	
25 metre sport pistol (ISSF)	Nicola Holmes (Jersey)	546	Eva Widing (Gotland)	535	Nikki Trebert (GGY)	527
50 metre prone smallbore rifle (ISSF)	Maurisa Smith (BER)	556	Eva Widing (Gotland)	552	Not awarded	
10 metre air pistol team (ISSF)	Guernsey; Rebecca Margetts; Nikki Trebert	1059	Not awarded		Not awarded	
25 metre sport pistol team (ISSF)	Guernsey; Rebecca Margetts; Nikki Trebert	1064	Not awarded		Not awarded	
50 metre prone smallbore rifle team (ISSF)	Gotland; Jehnny Gardelin; Eva Widing	1126	Not awarded		Not awarded	

=== Open events ===
Event	Gold		Silver		Bronze	
25 metre standard pistol team (ISSF)	Gotland; Bengt Hyytiäinen; Peter Nordgren	1083	Gibraltar; Jonathan David Patron; Daniel Payas	1013	Jersey; Christopher le Moeligou; Mick Radcliffe	958
50 metre 3 position smallbore rifle (ISSF)	Björn Ahlby (Gotland)	564	Simon Paul Henry (Saint Helena)	535	Lee Roussel (GGY)	531
50 metre 3 position smallbore rifle team (ISSF)	Gotland; Björn Ahlby; Lars-Olof Larsson	1089	Saint Helena; Simon Paul Henry; Carlos James Yon	1022	Jersey; Richard Bouchard; Andrew Chapman	1001
