= RIAC =

International airgun shooting competition in Luxembourg

- Status: Active
- Genre: Shooting Sports
- Frequency: Annually
- Venue: Centre National de Tir à l’Arc
- Country: Luxembourg
- Years active: 42
- Established: 1984
- Most recent: 2022
- Next event: 2023
- Area: Europe
- Major events: 10 metre air rifle; 10 metre air pistol
- Organiser: Fédération Luxembourgeoise de Tir aux Armes Sportives (FLTAS)
- Website: www.fltas.lu/riac/

RIAC is an annual international airgun shooting competition that has been hosted by the Fédération Luxembourgeoise de Tir aux Armes Sportives (FLTAS) since 1984. Events are contested for the 10 metre air rifle and 10 metre air pistol disciplines. It is run to ISSF standards but on a less formal basis than major sanctioned events, providing an opportunity for development athletes to build match experience in an international setting. RIAC is one third of the Benelux circuit of international matches, along with InterShoot in Den Haag and the IRS Cup in Belgium. RIAC was a founding member of the AirOShoot circuit.

== History ==
RIAC is one of a number of unsanctioned "B" competitions including InterShoot, the Intarso Reflex Shooting Cup (IRS Cup) and International Shooting Competition of Hanover (ISCH), which are not supervised by the ISSF but are generally recognised by coaches and national governing bodies as high quality events. Consequently they attract teams and athletes from across Europe, and occasionally further. The 2022 meeting was attended by 220 athletes from 15 countries.

RIAC was a founding member of AirOShoot in 2019. AirOShoot is an invitational competition in which the top finalists from a number of "B" airgun competitions across Europe (including RIAC) qualify for an annual "Super Final" at the end of each AirOShoot cycle. Athletes also earn points, which form a ranking.

Due to its timing in December, RIAC only missed one year (2020) due to COVID-19, and was able to resume at the end of 2021.

=== Programme ===
RIAC includes matches for ISSF 10 metre air rifle and 10 metre air pistol. Events are broken into Men's and Women's matches, with Junior and Senior competitions for a total of eight events.

RIAC takes place over four days, with the first day given to arrival and free training. On the other three days, each athlete fires a standard ISSF match every day, with an Olympic Final for the top 8. Unlike most international competitions, where one match is contested per discipline, the match-per-day format provides athletes with a lot of competition relative to their travel expense, making it popular with NGBs as a competition for development athletes to build match experience.

- Day 1 ("RIAC 1") - Individual matches, with scores counting for concurrent team competitions.
- Day 2 ("RIAC 2") - Individual matches.
- Day 3 ("IBIS Cup") - Individual matches, but the winners in each class are awarded the IBIS Cup.

== See also ==
- AirOShoot
- International Shooting Sport Federation
