= InterShoot =

International airgun shooting competition in the Netherlands

- Status: Active
- Genre: Shooting Sports
- Frequency: Annually
- Venue: Ockenburg Sports Hall
- Location: Den Haag
- Country: Netherlands
- Years active: 49
- Established: 1977
- Founder: Stek Geerts
- Most recent: 2023
- Next event: 2024
- Participants: 200-250
- Area: Europe
- Major events: 10 metre air rifle; 10 metre air pistol
- Organiser: Stichting InterShoot
- Website: intershoot.nl

InterShoot is an annual international airgun shooting competition hosted in Den Haag in the Netherlands. It is run to ISSF standards but on a less formal basis than major sanctioned events, providing an opportunity for junior and development athletes to build match experience in an international setting. Events are contested for the 10 metre air rifle and 10 metre air pistol disciplines.

== History ==
InterShoot was founded by Stek Geerts, with assistance from shooting figures across Europe. Geerts was looking for an opportunity for his athletes to compete at an international level and develop experience at a well run match. The event was envisaged as a place where juniors and development athletes in particular could compete, with matches run to ISSF standards but in a less formal atmosphere. This filled a gap between club and domestic competitions, and international competitions such as European Championships which were only open to athletes selected by their National Governing Body.

The first edition in 1977 was hosted at the SV Zoetermeer shooting club, but rapidly outgrew this venue. It moved to the "de Houtzagerij" sports centre in the centre of Den Haag until a refurbishment programme saw the event move to its current venue at the Ockenburg Sport Centre.

The competition has been held every year since 1977 with three exceptions. In 1982 the team was too busy running the European 10metre Championships, which were hosted in The Hague that year. In 2021 and 2022, the event was cancelled due to COVID-19.

The competition is one of a number of unsanctioned "B" competitions including RIAC and ISCH, which are not supervised by the ISSF but are generally recognised by coaches and national governing bodies as high quality events, and consequently attract teams and athletes from across Europe, and occasionally further. Teams from India are not uncommon. Since 2015, the event has routinely attracted more than 250 athletes across rifle and pistol. In 2019, InterShoot was a founding member of AirOShoot, an invitational competition in which the top finalists from a number of "B" competitions across Europe qualify for an annual "SuperFinal" at the end of the competition season. Athletes also earn points, which form a ranking.

== Programme ==
InterShoot includes matches for ISSF 10 metre air rifle and 10 metre air pistol. Events are broken into Men's and Women's matches, with Junior and Senior competitions for a total of eight events. Team prizes have also been awarded based on aggregated scores.

InterShoot takes place over four days, with the first day given to arrival and free training. On the other three days, each athlete fires a standard ISSF match every day, with an Olympic Final for the top 8. Unlike most international competitions, where one match is contested per discipline, the match-per-day format provides athletes with a lot of competition relative to their travel expense, in keeping with the organiser's ambitions for the event to provide athletes with a robust match-training opportunity.

== See also ==
- AirOShoot
- International Shooting Sport Federation
