= 2019 Games of the Small States of Europe =

Sports event held in Budva, Montenegro

XVIII Games of the Small States of Europe XVIII Igre malih zemalja Evrope XVIII Игре малих земаља Европе
- Host city: Budva
- Country: Montenegro
- Motto: How Big We Are; Be fair by nature (as part of the UNDP Green Games Programme)
- Nations: 9
- Athletes: 835
- Events: 113 in 10 sports
- Opening: 27 May 2019
- Closing: 1 June 2019
- Opened by: Milo Đukanović
- Website: www.montenegro2019.me

The 2019 Games of the Small States of Europe, also known as the XVIII Games of the Small States of Europe, took place in Budva, Montenegro, from 27 May to 1 June 2019.

== Development and preparation ==
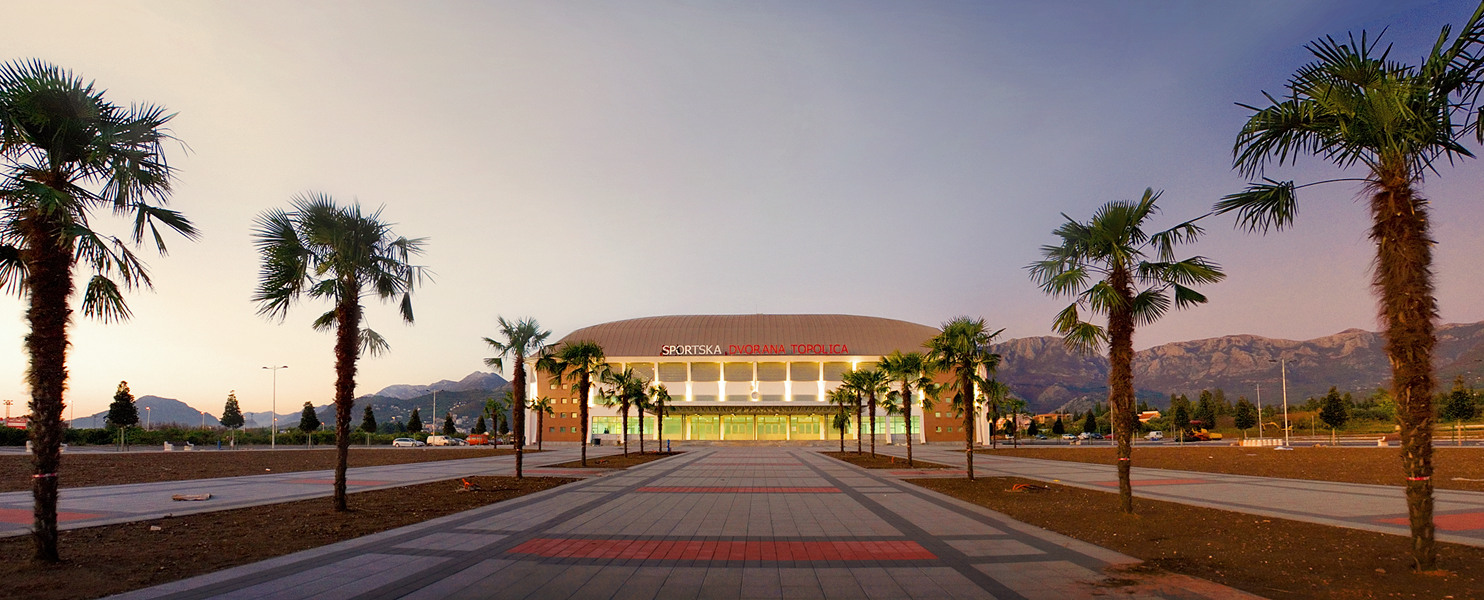
Topolica Sport Hall for the athletics and basketball

After the Games, The Malta Independent reported that many of the facilities were "not up to standard" and that the athletics track had been finished just 24 hours before events were due to start.

=== Venues ===
Sport/Event	Venues	City/Locality
Athletics	Topolica Sport Hall	Bar
Basketball	Topolica Sport Hall	Bar
Boules	Olympic Park	Budva
Judo	SC Cetinje	Cetinje
Shooting	SC Rea	Budva
Shooting	Markovići Shooting Range	Budva
Swimming	Morača Sports Center	Podgorica
Table tennis	Župa Hall	Tivat
Tennis	Slovenska Plaža Center	Slovenska
Volleyball	Morača Sports Center	Podgorica

== Games ==
The 2019 Games were the first time Montenegro has hosted the event since its inception into the GSSE in 2009.

The Games opened on the 27 May 2019 with around 2000 people attending the ceremony.

=== Participating teams ===
- Andorra (details) (27)
- Cyprus (details) (142)
- Iceland (details) (120)
- Liechtenstein (details) (33)
- Luxembourg (details) (140)
- Malta (details) (80)
- Monaco (details) (116)
- Montenegro (host nation) (details) (130)
- San Marino (details) (58)

Both the Faroe Islands and the Vatican City expressed an interest in participating in the Games but neither have an official Olympic Committee, one of the requirements of participation in the GSSE.

=== Sports ===
There were competitions in ten different disciplines:

- Athletics
- Basketball
- Boules
- Judo
- Shooting
- Swimming
- Table tennis
- Tennis
- Volleyball
  - Volleyball
  - Beach volleyball

=== Calendar ===
OC	Opening ceremony	●	Event competitions	1	Event finals	CC	Closing ceremony

May / June	27 Mon	28 Tue	29 Wed	30 Thu	31 Fri	1 Sat	Total
Ceremonies	OC					CC	
Athletics			11	11	15		37
Basketball		●	●	●	●	2	2
Beach volleyball		●	●	●	2		2
Boules		●	1	3			4
Judo		9		2			11
Shooting			●	3	3		6
Swimming		12	12	14			38
Table tennis		●	2	2	●	2	6
Tennis		●	●	●	●	5	5
Volleyball		●	●	●	●	2	2
Total events		21	26	35	20	11	113
May / June	27 Mon	28 Tue	29 Wed	30 Thu	31 Fri	1 Sat	Total

== Medal table ==
Luxembourg topped the medal table, winning 77 medals including 26 golds.

* Host nation (Montenegro)

Rank	Nation	Gold	Silver	Bronze	Total
1	Luxembourg (LUX)	26	27	24	77
2	Cyprus (CYP)	21	27	16	64
3	Iceland (ISL)	19	13	23	55
4	Monaco (MON)	15	13	20	48
5	Montenegro (MNE)*	15	6	14	35
6	Liechtenstein (LIE)	9	5	6	20
7	Malta (MLT)	6	12	9	27
8	Andorra (AND)	3	4	11	18
9	San Marino (SMR)	1	4	7	12
Totals (9 entries)		115	111	130	356
