= 2017 Games of the Small States of Europe =

International multi-sport event

XVII Games of the Small States of Europe XVII Giochi dei piccoli stati d'Europa
- Country: San Marino
- Nations: 9
- Events: 131 in 11 sports
- Opening: 29 May 2017
- Closing: 3 June 2017
- Opened by: Mimma Zavoli and Vanessa D'Ambrosio
- Website: www.sanmarino2017.sm

The 2017 Games of the Small States of Europe, also known as the XVII Games of the Small States of Europe, took place in San Marino from 29 May to 3 June 2017.

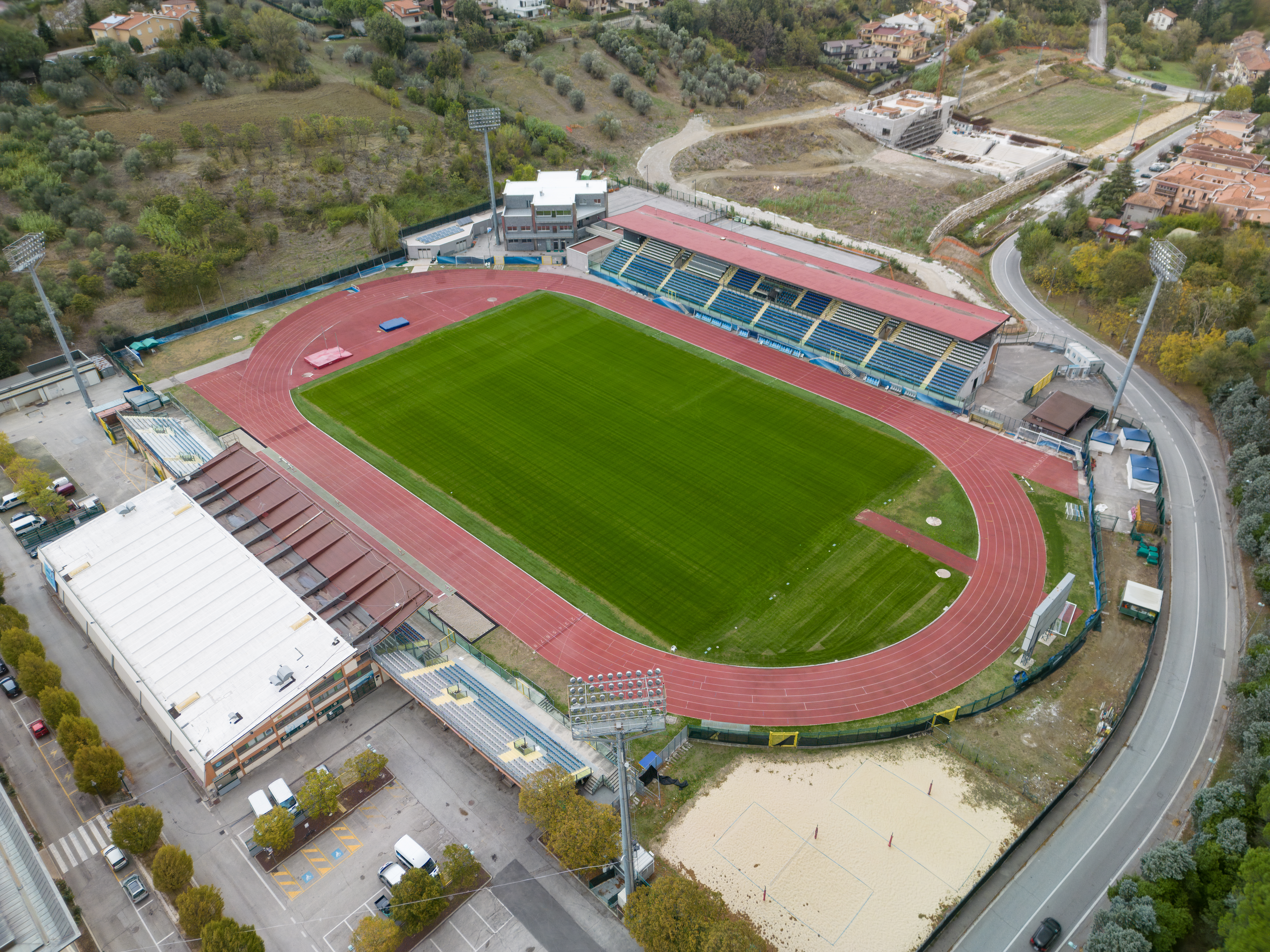
Stadio Olimpico di Serravalle (San Marino Stadium) was used for the opening and closing ceremonies and the athletics competitions

== Development and preparation ==
=== Venues ===
Sport/Event	Venues	City/Locality
Archery	Montecchio Stadium	San Marino
Athletics	San Marino Stadium	Serravalle
Basketball	Multieventi Sport Domus	Serravalle
Beach volleyball	Beach Volley Arena	Serravalle
Boules	Bocciodromo San Marino	Borgo Maggiore
Judo	Acquaviva School Gym	Acquaviva
Shooting (air)	Shooting Area	Acquaviva
Shooting (clay)	Tiro a Volo	San Marino
Swimming	Multieventi Piscina	Serravalle
Table tennis	Kursaal Congress Center	San Marino
Tennis	Montecchio Tennis Center	San Marino
Volleyball	Palestra A. Casadei	Serravalle
Opening and closing ceremonies	San Marino Stadium	Serravalle

== Games ==
=== Participating teams ===
- Andorra (49)
- Cyprus (143)
- Iceland (136)
- Liechtenstein (43)
- Luxembourg (150)
- Malta (86)
- Monaco (99)
- Montenegro (46)
- San Marino (host nation) (125)

=== Sports ===
- Archery (8)
- Athletics (37)
- Basketball (2)
- Boules (7)
- Cycling (9)
- Judo (14)
- Shooting (7)
- Swimming (32)
- Table tennis (6)
- Tennis (5)
- Volleyball
  - Volleyball (2)
  - Beach volleyball (2)

=== Calendar ===
OC	Opening ceremony	●	Event competitions	1	Event finals	CC	Closing ceremony

May/June	29th Mon	30th Tue	31st Wed	1st Thur	2nd Fri	3rd Sat	Total
Ceremonies	OC					CC	
Archery		●	●	●	8		8
Athletics		10		12		15	37
Basketball		●	●	●	1	1	2
Beach volleyball		●	●	●	2		2
Boules		3	4				7
Cycling (mountain biking)					3		3
Cycling (road)		4				2	6
Judo			12		2		14
Shooting (air)			2	2			4
Shooting (clay)		●	1		1	1	3
Swimming		8	10	8	6		32
Table tennis		●	2	2	●	2	6
Tennis		●	●	●	3	2	5
Volleyball		●	●	●	●	2	2
Total gold medals		25	31	24	26	25	131
May/June	29th Mon	30th Tue	31st Wed	1st Thur	2nd Fri	3rd Sat	Total

== Medal table ==
Key:

Host country

Rank	Nation	Gold	Silver	Bronze	Total
1	Luxembourg (LUX)	38	36	24	98
2	Cyprus (CYP)	30	35	19	84
3	Iceland (ISL)	27	14	19	60
4	Montenegro (MNE)	13	6	12	31
5	Monaco (MON)	8	10	16	34
6	San Marino (SMR)*	6	10	14	30
7	Malta (MLT)	4	9	16	29
8	Liechtenstein (LIE)	4	5	9	18
9	Andorra (AND)	1	6	10	17
Totals (9 entries)		131	131	139	401
