= Germany at the 2016 Summer Olympics =

- IOC code: GER
- NOC: German Olympic Sports Confederation
- Website: www.dosb.de (in German, English, and French)

in Rio de Janeiro
- Competitors: 422 in 27 sports
- Flag bearers: Timo Boll (opening); Sebastian Brendel (closing)
- Medals Ranked 5th: Gold 17 Silver 10 Bronze 15 Total 42

Summer Olympics appearances (overview)
- 1896; 1900; 1904; 1908; 1912; 1920–1924; 1928; 1932; 1936; 1948; 1952; 1956–1988; 1992; 1996; 2000; 2004; 2008; 2012; 2016; 2020; 2024; 2028

Other related appearances
- 1906 Intercalated Games –––– Saar (1952); United Team of Germany (1956–1964); East Germany (1968–1988); West Germany (1968–1988)

Germany competed at the 2016 Summer Olympics in Rio de Janeiro, from 3 to 21 August 2016. This was the nation's seventh consecutive appearance at the Summer Olympics after its reunification in 1990.

== Medalists ==
The following German competitors won medals at the Games.

Medal	Name	Sport	Event	Date
Gold	Michael Jung	Equestrian	Individual eventing	9 August
Gold	Philipp Wende; Lauritz Schoof; Karl Schulze; Hans Gruhne	Rowing	Men's quadruple sculls	11 August
Gold	Annekatrin Thiele; Carina Bär; Julia Lier; Lisa Schmidla	Rowing	Women's quadruple sculls	11 August
Gold	Barbara Engleder	Shooting	Women's 50 m rifle three positions	11 August
Gold	Henri Junghänel	Shooting	Men's 50 m rifle prone	12 August
Gold	Kristina Bröring-Sprehe; Sönke Rothenberger; Dorothee Schneider; Isabell Werth	Equestrian	Team dressage	12 August
Gold	Christoph Harting	Athletics	Men's discus throw	13 August
Gold	Christian Reitz	Shooting	Men's 25 m rapid fire pistol	13 August
Gold	Sebastian Brendel	Canoeing	Men's C-1 1000 m	16 August
Gold	Fabian Hambüchen	Gymnastics	Men's horizontal bar	16 August
Gold	Kristina Vogel	Cycling	Women's sprint	16 August
Gold	Laura Ludwig; Kira Walkenhorst	Volleyball	Women's beach volleyball	17 August
Gold	Max Rendschmidt; Marcus Gross	Canoeing	Men's K-2 1000 m	18 August
Gold	Germany women's national football team: Almuth Schult; Josephine Henning; Saskia Bartusiak; Leonie Maier; Annike Krahn; Simone Laudehr; Melanie Behringer; Lena Goeßling; Alexandra Popp; Dzsenifer Marozsán; Anja Mittag; Tabea Kemme; Sara Däbritz; Babett Peter; Mandy Islacker; Melanie Leupolz; Isabel Kerschowski; Laura Benkarth; Svenja Huth	Football	Women's tournament	19 August
Gold	Sebastian Brendel; Jan Vandrey	Canoeing	Men's C-2 1000 metres	20 August
Gold	Max Rendschmidt; Tom Liebscher; Max Hoff; Marcus Gross	Canoeing	Men's K-4 1000 metres	20 August
Gold	Thomas Röhler	Athletics	Men's javelin throw	20 August
Silver	Sandra Auffarth; Michael Jung; Ingrid Klimke; Julia Krajewski	Equestrian	Team eventing	9 August
Silver	Monika Karsch	Shooting	Women's 25 m pistol	9 August
Silver	Lisa Unruh	Archery	Women's individual	11 August
Silver	Felix Drahotta; Malte Jakschik; Eric Johannesen; Andreas Kuffner; Maximilian Munski; Hannes Ocik; Maximilian Reinelt; Richard Schmidt; Martin Sauer (cox)	Rowing	Men's eight	13 August
Silver	Angelique Kerber	Tennis	Women's singles	13 August
Silver	Isabell Werth	Equestrian	Individual dressage	15 August
Silver	Franziska Weber; Tina Dietze	Canoeing	Women's K-2 500 metres	16 August
Silver	Han Ying; Petrissa Solja; Shan Xiaona	Table tennis	Women's team	16 August
Silver	Sabrina Hering; Franziska Weber; Steffi Kriegerstein; Tina Dietze	Canoeing	Women's K-4 500 metres	20 August
Silver	Germany Olympic football team: Timo Horn; Jeremy Toljan; Lukas Klostermann; Matthias Ginter; Niklas Süle; Sven Bender; Max Meyer; Lars Bender; Davie Selke; Leon Goretzka; Julian Brandt; Jannik Huth; Philipp Max; Robert Bauer; Max Christiansen; Grischa Prömel; Serge Gnabry; Nils Petersen	Football	Men's tournament	20 August
Bronze	Laura Vargas Koch	Judo	Women's 70 kg	10 August
Bronze	Kristina Vogel; Miriam Welte	Cycling	Women's team sprint	12 August
Bronze	Daniel Jasinski	Athletics	Men's discus throw	13 August
Bronze	Sophie Scheder	Gymnastics	Women's uneven bars	14 August
Bronze	Kristina Bröring-Sprehe	Equestrian	Individual dressage	15 August
Bronze	Denis Kudla	Wrestling	Men's Greco-Roman 85 kg	15 August
Bronze	Patrick Hausding	Diving	Men's 3 metre springboard	16 August
Bronze	Christian Ahlmann; Meredith Michaels-Beerbaum; Daniel Deusser; Ludger Beerbaum	Equestrian	Team jumping	17 August
Bronze	Dimitrij Ovtcharov; Timo Boll; Bastian Steger	Table tennis	Men's team	17 August
Bronze	Germany men's national field hockey team: Linus Butt; Moritz Fürste; Florian Fuchs; Mats Grambusch; Tom Grambusch; Martin Häner; Tobias Hauke; Timm Herzbruch; Nicolas Jacobi; Mathias Müller; Timur Oruz; Christopher Rühr; Moritz Trompertz; Niklas Wellen; Christopher Wesley; Martin Zwicker	Field hockey	Men's tournament	18 August
Bronze	Erik Heil; Thomas Plößel	Sailing	49er	18 August
Bronze	Germany women's national field hockey team: Lisa Hahn; Franzisca Hauke; Hannah Krüger; Nike Lorenz; Marie Mävers; Julia Müller; Janne Müller-Wieland; Pia-Sophie Oldhafer; Selin Oruz; Katharina Otte; Cécile Pieper; Kristina Reynolds; Anne Schröder; Lisa Schütze; Annika Sprink; Charlotte Stapenhorst; Jana Teschke	Field hockey	Women's tournament	19 August
Bronze	Artem Harutyunyan	Boxing	Men's light welterweight	19 August
Bronze	Ronald Rauhe	Canoeing	Men's K-1 200 m	20 August
Bronze	Germany men's national handball team: Christian Dissinger; Paul Drux; Uwe Gensheimer; Patrick Groetzki; Kai Häfner; Silvio Heinevetter; Julius Kühn; Finn Lemke; Hendrik Pekeler; Tobias Reichmann; Martin Strobel; Steffen Weinhold; Fabian Wiede; Patrick Wiencek; Andreas Wolff	Handball	Men's tournament	21 August

Medals by sport
Sport	1st place, gold medalist(s)	2nd place, silver medalist(s)	3rd place, bronze medalist(s)	Total
Canoeing	4	2	1	7
Shooting	3	1	0	4
Equestrian	2	2	2	6
Rowing	2	1	0	3
Athletics	2	0	1	3
Football	1	1	0	2
Cycling	1	0	1	2
Gymnastics	1	0	1	2
Volleyball	1	0	0	1
Table tennis	0	1	1	2
Archery	0	1	0	1
Tennis	0	1	0	1
Field hockey	0	0	2	2
Boxing	0	0	1	1
Diving	0	0	1	1
Handball	0	0	1	1
Judo	0	0	1	1
Sailing	0	0	1	1
Wrestling	0	0	1	1
Total	17	10	15	42

Medals by date
Day	Date	1st place, gold medalist(s)	2nd place, silver medalist(s)	3rd place, bronze medalist(s)	Total
Day 1	6 August	0	0	0	0
Day 2	7 August	0	0	0	0
Day 3	8 August	0	0	0	0
Day 4	9 August	1	2	0	3
Day 5	10 August	0	0	1	1
Day 6	11 August	3	1	0	4
Day 7	12 August	2	0	1	3
Day 8	13 August	2	2	1	5
Day 9	14 August	0	0	1	1
Day 10	15 August	0	1	3	4
Day 11	16 August	3	2	1	6
Day 12	17 August	1	0	2	3
Day 13	18 August	1	0	2	3
Day 14	19 August	1	0	2	3
Day 15	20 August	3	2	1	6
Day 16	21 August	0	0	1	1
Total		17	10	15	42

Medals by gender
Gender	1st place, gold medalist(s)	2nd place, silver medalist(s)	3rd place, bronze medalist(s)	Total
Male	10	2	9	21
Female	5	6	5	15
Mixed	2	2	2	6
Total	17	10	15	42

Multiple medalists
Name	Sport	1st place, gold medalist(s)	2nd place, silver medalist(s)	3rd place, bronze medalist(s)	Total
Sebastian Brendel	Canoeing	2	0	0	2
Marcus Groß	Canoeing	2	0	0	2
Max Rendschmidt	Canoeing	2	0	0	2
Tina Dietze	Canoeing	0	2	2	2
Franziska Weber	Canoeing	0	2	0	2
Kristina Vogel	Cycling	1	0	1	2
Isabell Werth	Equestrian	1	1	0	2
Kristina Bröring-Sprehe	Equestrian	1	0	1	2
Michael Jung	Equestrian	1	1	0	2

== Competitors ==
The following is the list of number of competitors participating in the Games. Note that reserves in fencing, field hockey, football, and handball are not counted as athletes:

Sport	Men	Women	Total
Archery	1	1	2
Athletics	37	48	85
Badminton	3	4	7
Boxing	6	0	6
Canoeing	12	9	21
Cycling	15	14	29
Diving	4	4	8
Equestrian	7	5	12
Fencing	3	1	4
Field hockey	16	16	32
Football	18	19	37
Golf	2	2	4
Gymnastics	5	12	17
Handball	14	0	14
Judo	7	6	13
Modern pentathlon	2	2	4
Rowing	25	10	35
Sailing	7	5	12
Shooting	9	6	15
Swimming	17	12	29
Table tennis	3	3	6
Taekwondo	2	1	3
Tennis	3	5	8
Triathlon	0	2	2
Volleyball	2	4	6
Weightlifting	4	1	5
Wrestling	3	4	7
Total	227	196	423

== Archery ==
Two German archers qualified for both the men's and women's individual recurve by obtaining one of the eight Olympic places available from the 2015 World Archery Championships in Copenhagen, Denmark. Following the completion of internal selections, Florian Floto and Lisa Unruh were named to the German archery team on 23 June 2016.

Athlete	Event	Ranking round		Round of 64	Round of 32	Round of 16	Quarterfinals	Semifinals	Final / BM	
Athlete	Event	Score	Seed	Opposition Score	Opposition Score	Opposition Score	Opposition Score	Opposition Score	Opposition Score	Rank
Florian Floto	Men's individual	677	11	Piippo (FIN); W 6–0	Mohamad (MAS); W 6–4	Ku B-c (KOR); L 4–6	Did not advance			
Lisa Unruh	Women's individual	640	21	Brito (VEN); W 6–4	Bayardo (MEX); W 6–4	Cao H (CHN); W 6–2	Tan Y-t (TPE); W 6–5	Valencia (MEX); W 6–2	Chang H-j (KOR); L 2–6	2nd place, silver medalist(s)

== Athletics ==
German athletes have so far achieved qualifying standards in the following athletics events (up to a maximum of 3 athletes in each event): The team will select its athletes with a specific qualifying standard based on the results at the 2015 IAAF World Championships, the 2016 European Championships, Olympic trials, and other events approved by the German Athletics Association.

On 31 May 2016, six marathon runners (three per gender), highlighted by London 2012 Olympian Arne Gabius, were the first batch of German track and field athletes to be selected to the Olympic roster. On 28 July 2016, Arne Gabius declared his withdrawal from the Games due to a hip injury.

Following the end of the qualifying period, a total of 86 athletes (38 men and 48 women) were named to the track and field team for the Games; 28 of them managed to achieve their results at the German Championships (19 to 26 June), while the remainder were added through a discretionary selection criteria by the German Athletics Association. Notable German athletes featured reigning Olympic discus throw champion Robert Harting and his younger brother Christoph, shot put runner-up David Storl, hammer thrower Betty Heidler, pole vaulter Raphael Holzdeppe, Worlds medalists Rico Freimuth, Gesa Felicitas Krause and Christina Schwanitz, and javelin thrower and current world leader Thomas Röhler.

Key

- Note–Ranks given for track events are within the athlete's heat only
- Q = Qualified for the next round
- q = Qualified for the next round as a fastest loser or, in field events, by position without achieving the qualifying target
- NR = National record
- N/A = Round not applicable for the event
- Bye = Athlete not required to compete in round

Men
Track & road events

Athlete	Event	Heat		Quarterfinal		Semifinal		Final	
Athlete	Event	Result	Rank	Result	Rank	Result	Rank	Result	Rank
Nils Brembach	20 km walk	—N/a						1:23:46	38
Matthias Bühler	110 m hurdles	13.90	4	—N/a		Did not advance			
Carl Dohmann	50 km walk	—N/a						DNF	
Robin Erewa	200 m	20.61	5	—N/a		Did not advance			
Julian Flügel	Marathon	—N/a						2:20:47	71
Lucas Jakubczyk	100 m	Bye		10.29	5	Did not advance			
Alexander John	110 m hurdles	14.13	5	—N/a		Did not advance			
Christopher Linke	20 km walk	—N/a						1:20:00	5
Aleixo-Platini Menga	200 m	20.80	5	—N/a		Did not advance			
Florian Orth	5000 m	13:28.88	14	—N/a				Did not advance	
Hagen Pohle	20 km walk	—N/a						1:21:44	18
Hagen Pohle	50 km walk	—N/a						DNF	
Philipp Pflieger	Marathon	—N/a						2:18:56	55
Julian Reus	100 m	Bye		10.34	7	Did not advance			
Julian Reus	200 m	20.39 SB	3	—N/a		Did not advance			
Richard Ringer	5000 m	14:05.01	20	—N/a				Did not advance	
Homiyu Tesfaye	1500 m	3:47:44	7	—N/a		Did not advance			
Gregor Traber	110 m hurdles	13.50	3 Q	—N/a		13.43	5	Did not advance	
Robin Erewa; Robert Hering; Sven Knipphals; Lucas Jakubczyk; Julian Reus; Alexander Kosenkow; Roy Schmidt	4 × 100 m relay	38.26	6	—N/a				Did not advance	

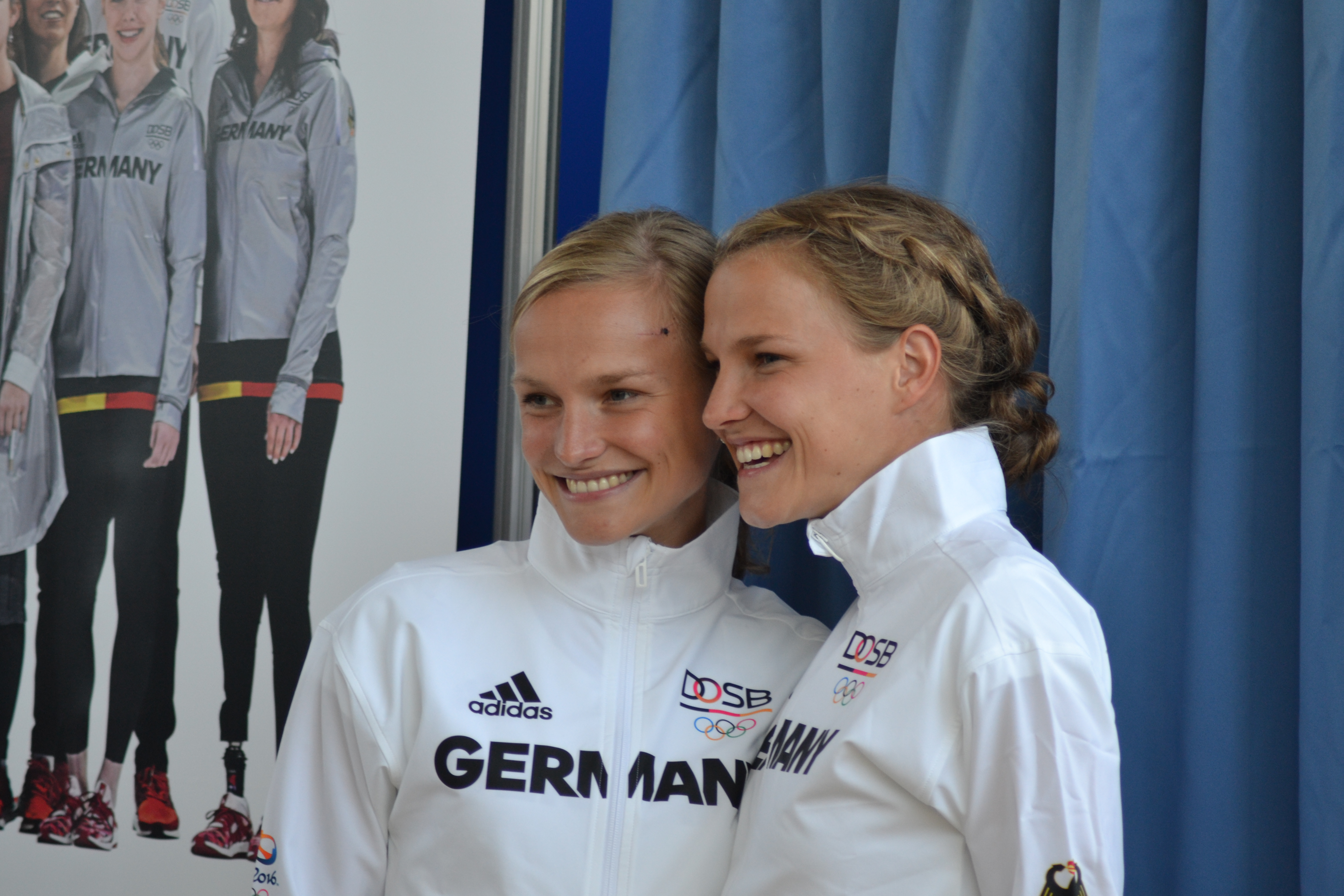
The Hahner twins at the unveiling of the German Olympic team uniform.

Women

Athlete	Event	Heat		Quarterfinal		Semifinal		Final	
Athlete	Event	Result	Rank	Result	Rank	Result	Rank	Result	Rank
Jackie Baumann	400 m hurdles	59.04	6	—N/a		Did not advance			
Pamela Dutkiewicz	100 m hurdles	12.90	3 Q	—N/a		12.92	4	Did not advance	
Nadine Gonska	200 m	23.03	4	—N/a		Did not advance			
Rebekka Haase	100 m	Bye		11.41	5	Did not advance			
Anna Hahner	Marathon	—N/a						2:45:32	81
Lisa Hahner	Marathon	—N/a						2:45:33	82
Christina Hering	800 m	2:01.04	7	—N/a		Did not advance			
Nadine Hildebrand	100 m hurdles	12.84	2 Q	—N/a		12.95	4	Did not advance	
Konstanze Klosterhalfen	1500 m	4:11.76	6 Q	—N/a		4:07.26	10	Did not advance	
Fabienne Kohlmann	800 m	2:05.36	7	—N/a		Did not advance			
Sanaa Koubaa	3000 m steeplechase	9:35.15 PB	9	—N/a				Did not advance	
Gesa Felicitas Krause	3000 m steeplechase	9:19.70	3 Q	—N/a				9:18.41	6
Gina Lückenkemper	200 m	22.80	3 q	—N/a		22.73	5	Did not advance	
Lisa Mayer	200 m	22.86	2 Q	—N/a		22.90	7	Did not advance	
Tatjana Pinto	100 m	Bye		11.31	2 Q	11.32	7	Did not advance	
Maya Rehberg	3000 m steeplechase	9:51.73	15	—N/a				Did not advance	
Cindy Roleder	100 m hurdles	12.86	1 Q	—N/a		12.69	3 q	12.74	5
Anja Scherl	Marathon	—N/a						2:37:23	44
Ruth Spelmeyer	400 m	51.43 PB	3 q	—N/a		51.61	6	Did not advance	
Diana Sujew	1500 m	4:09.07	10 q	—N/a		4:10.15	9	Did not advance	
Alexandra Burghardt; Rebekka Haase; Yasmin Kwadwo; Tatjana Pinto	4 × 100 m relay	42.18	1 Q	—N/a				42.10	4
Lara Hoffmann; Friederike Möhlenkamp; Laura Müller; Ruth Spelmeyer	4 × 400 m relay	3:26.02	5	—N/a				Did not advance	

Field events
Men

Athlete	Event	Qualification		Final	
Athlete	Event	Distance	Position	Distance	Position
Alyn Camara	Long jump	5.16	30	Did not advance	
Tobias Dahm	Shot put	19.62	22	Did not advance	
Karsten Dilla	Pole vault	5.30	28	Did not advance	
Christoph Harting	Discus throw	65.41	3 Q	68.37 PB	1st place, gold medalist(s)
Robert Harting	Discus throw	62.21	15	Did not advance	
Fabian Heinle	Long jump	7.79	18	Did not advance	
Max Heß	Triple jump	16.56	15	Did not advance	
Raphael Holzdeppe	Pole vault	5.45	25	Did not advance	
Daniel Jasinski	Discus throw	62.83	11 Q	67.08	3rd place, bronze medalist(s)
Eike Onnen	High jump	2.26	24	Did not advance	
Mateusz Przybylko	High jump	2.22	28	Did not advance	
Thomas Röhler	Javelin throw	83.01	9 Q	90.30	1st place, gold medalist(s)
Tobias Scherbarth	Pole vault	5.45	26	Did not advance	
David Storl	Shot put	20.47	10 q	20.64	7
Johannes Vetter	Javelin throw	85.96	2 Q	85.32	4
Julian Weber	Javelin throw	84.46	3 Q	81.36	9

Women

Athlete	Event	Qualification		Final	
Athlete	Event	Distance	Position	Distance	Position
Shanice Craft	Discus throw	60.23	12 q	59.83	11
Jenny Elbe	Triple jump	14.02	13	Did not advance	
Julia Fischer	Discus throw	61.83	9 q	62.67	9
Sara Gambetta	Shot put	17.24	20	Did not advance	
Kristin Gierisch	Triple jump	14.26	4 q	13.96	11
Betty Heidler	Hammer throw	71.17	6 q	73.71	4
Christin Hussong	Javelin throw	62.17	11 q	57.70	12
Marie-Laurence Jungfleisch	High jump	1.94	12 Q	1.93	=7
Kathrin Klaas	Hammer throw	67.92	18	Did not advance	
Malaika Mihambo	Long jump	6.82	2 Q	6.95 PB	4
Sosthene Moguenara	Long jump	6.55	11 q	6.61	10
Nadine Müller	Discus throw	63.67	5 Q	63.13	6
Christina Obergföll	Javelin throw	62.18	10 q	62.92	8
Annika Roloff	Pole vault	4.45	21	Did not advance	
Lisa Ryzih	Pole vault	4.60	2 Q	4.50	10
Christina Schwanitz	Shot put	19.18	2 Q	19.03	6
Linda Stahl	Javelin throw	63.95	4 Q	59.71	11
Martina Strutz	Pole vault	4.60	7 Q	4.60	9
Lena Urbaniak	Shot put	16.62	29	Did not advance	
Alexandra Wester	Long jump	5.98	34	Did not advance	
Charlene Woitha	Hammer throw	62.50	29	Did not advance	

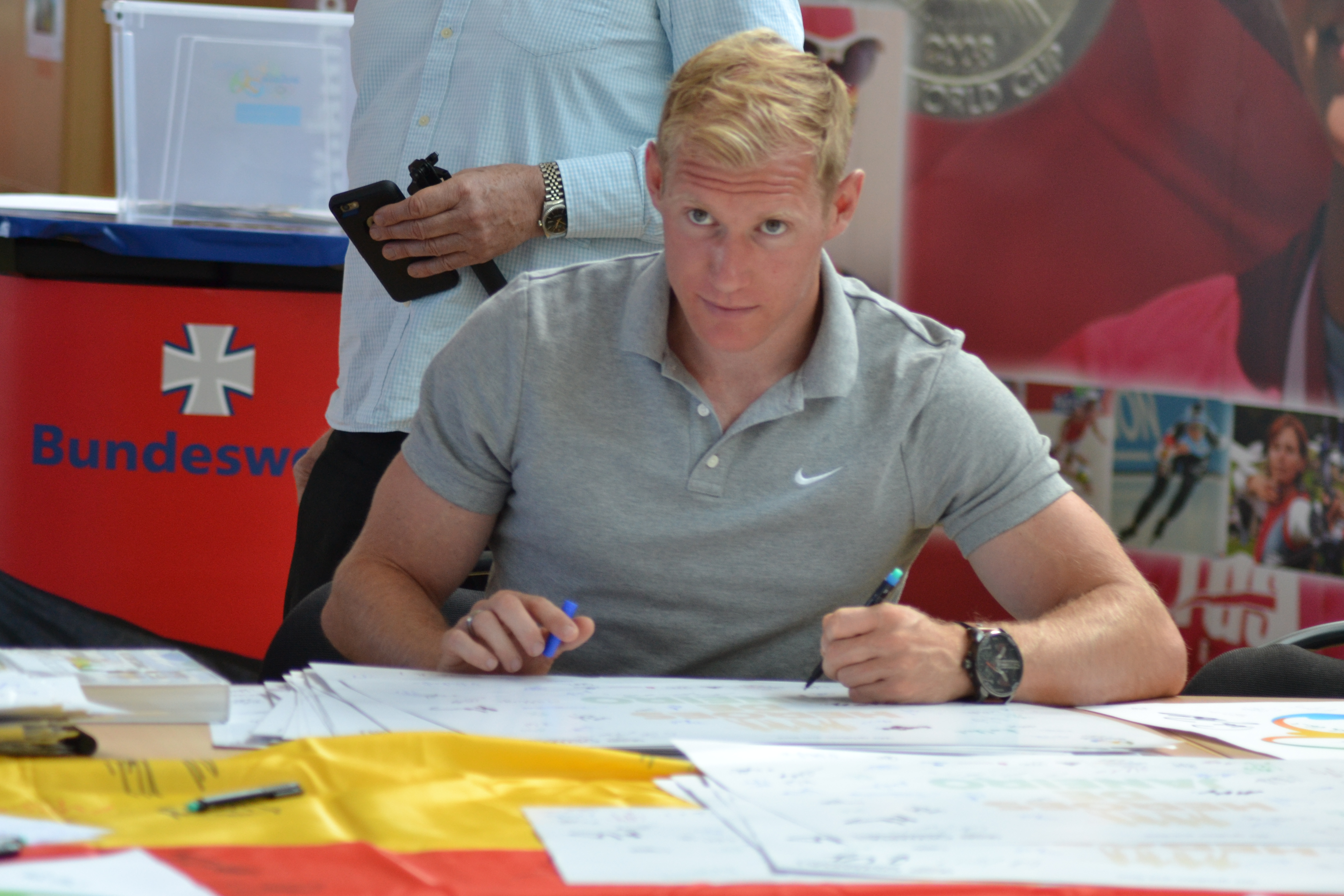
Arthur Abele writing autographs at the unveiling of the German Olympic team uniform.

Combined events – Men's decathlon

Athlete	Event	100 m	LJ	SP	HJ	400 m	110H	DT	PV	JT	1500 m	Final	Rank
Arthur Abele	Result	10.87	6.97	15.03	1.98	49.02	14.12	44.66	4.50	64.13	4:53.07	8013	15
Arthur Abele	Points	890	807	792	785	860	959	760	760	800	600	8013	15
Rico Freimuth	Result	10.73	7.17 SB	13.27	DNS	—	—	—	—	—	—	DNF	
Rico Freimuth	Points	922	854	684	0	—	—	—	—	—	—	DNF	
Kai Kazmirek	Result	10.78	7.69 PB	14.20	2.10	46.75	14.62	43.25	5.00	64.60	4:31.25	8580	4
Kai Kazmirek	Points	910	982	741	896	971	896	731	910	807	736	8580	4

Combined events – Women's heptathlon

Athlete	Event	100H	HJ	SP	200 m	LJ	JT	800 m	Final	Rank
Jennifer Oeser	Result	13.69	1.86 PB	14.28 SB	24.99	6.19 SB	47.22	2:13.82 SB	6401 SB	9
Jennifer Oeser	Points	1023	1054	813	888	908	806	909	6401 SB	9
Claudia Rath	Result	13.63	1.74	12.83	24.48	6.55	39.39	2:07.22 SB	6270	14
Claudia Rath	Points	1031	903	716	935	1023	656	1006	6270	14
Carolin Schäfer	Result	13.12 PB	1.83 SB	14.57 PB	23.99	6.20	47.99	2:16.52 SB	6540	5
Carolin Schäfer	Points	1106	1016	832	982	912	821	871	6540	5

== Badminton ==
Germany has qualified a total of seven badminton players for each of the following events into the Olympic tournament based on the BWF World Rankings as of 5 May 2016: one entry each in the men's and women's singles, and a pair in the men's, women's, and mixed doubles. The badminton team was officially named as part of the first batch of nominated athletes to the Olympic roster on 31 May 2016.

Men

Athlete	Event	Group stage				Elimination	Quarterfinal	Semifinal	Final / BM	
Athlete	Event	Opposition Score	Opposition Score	Opposition Score	Rank	Opposition Score	Opposition Score	Opposition Score	Opposition Score	Rank
Marc Zwiebler	Singles	Evans (IRL); L (21–9, 17–21, 7–21)	de Oliveira (BRA); W (21–12, 21–12)	—N/a	2	Did not advance				
Michael Fuchs; Johannes Schöttler	Doubles	Goh V S / Tan W K (MAS); L (14–21, 17–21)	Fu Hf / Zhang N (CHN); L (11–21, 16–21)	Chew / Pongnairat (USA); W (21–14, 21–14)	3	—N/a	Did not advance			

Women

Athlete	Event	Group stage				Elimination	Quarterfinal	Semifinal	Final / BM	
Athlete	Event	Opposition Score	Opposition Score	Opposition Score	Rank	Opposition Score	Opposition Score	Opposition Score	Opposition Score	Rank
Karin Schnaase	Singles	Magee (IRL); W (21–14, 21–19)	Wang Yh (CHN); L (11–21, 16–21)	—N/a	2	Did not advance				
Johanna Goliszewski; Carla Nelte	Doubles	Tang Yt / Yu Y (CHN); L (10–21, 11–21)	Chang Y-n / Lee S-h (KOR); L (18–21, 21–18, 17–21)	G Stoeva / S Stoeva (BUL); L (14–21, 19–21)	4	—N/a	Did not advance			

Mixed

Athlete	Event	Group stage				Quarterfinal	Semifinal	Final / BM	
Athlete	Event	Opposition Score	Opposition Score	Opposition Score	Rank	Opposition Score	Opposition Score	Opposition Score	Rank
Michael Fuchs; Birgit Michels	Doubles	Zhang N / Zhao Yl (CHN); L (19–21, 16–21)	Jordan / Susanto (INA); L (16–21, 15–21)	Lee C H / Chau H W (HKG); L (17–21, 14–21)	4	Did not advance			

== Boxing ==
Germany has entered six boxers to compete in the following weight classes into the Olympic boxing tournament. Artem Harutyunyan and Erik Pfeifer were the only Germans finishing among the top two of their respective division in the AIBA Pro Boxing series, whereas David Graf did so in the World Series of Boxing. Light heavyweight boxer Serge Michel had claimed an Olympic spot with his quarterfinal triumph at the 2016 AIBA World Qualifying Tournament in Baku, Azerbaijan.

Hamza Touba and Arajik Marutjan rounded out the German roster by virtue of their top two finish at the 2016 APB and WSB Olympic Qualifier in Vargas, Venezuela.

Athlete	Event	Round of 32	Round of 16	Quarterfinals	Semifinals	Final	
Athlete	Event	Opposition Result	Opposition Result	Opposition Result	Opposition Result	Opposition Result	Rank
Hamza Touba	Men's flyweight	Konki (FRA); L 0–3	Did not advance				
Artem Harutyunyan	Men's light welterweight	Bye	Biyarslanov (CAN); W 2–0	Gözgeç (TUR); W 3–0	Sotomayor (AZE); L 0–3	Did not advance	3rd place, bronze medalist(s)
Arajik Marutjan	Men's welterweight	Maestre (VEN); L 1–2	Did not advance				
Serge Michel	Men's light heavyweight	Mina (ECU); L 0–3	Did not advance				
David Graf	Men's heavyweight	Bye	Peralta (ARG); L 1–2	Did not advance			
Erik Pfeifer	Men's super heavyweight	Laurent (ISV); L 1–2	Did not advance				

== Canoeing ==
=== Slalom ===
German canoeists have qualified a maximum of one boat in each of the following classes through the 2015 ICF Canoe Slalom World Championships. The roster of German slalom canoeists, led by London 2012 medalists Hannes Aigner and Sideris Tasiadis, was announced on 17 April 2016 as a result of their top performances at two selection meets of the Olympic Trials, both held in Augsburg (8 to 10 April) and Markkleeberg (15 to 17 April).

Athlete	Event	Preliminary						Semifinal		Final	
Athlete	Event	Run 1	Rank	Run 2	Rank	Best	Rank	Time	Rank	Time	Rank
Sideris Tasiadis	Men's C-1	100.47	8	92.23	1	92.23	1 Q	95.63	1 Q	97.90	5
Franz Anton; Jan Benzien	Men's C-2	103.43	4	114.35	8	103.43	5 Q	107.93	1 Q	103.58	4
Hannes Aigner	Men's K-1	90.33	7	87.31	2	87.31	3 Q	91.87	6 Q	89.02	4
Melanie Pfeifer	Women's K-1	115.60	15	107.30	12	107.30	14 Q	108.58	10 Q	106.89	7

=== Sprint ===
German canoeists have qualified a total of six boats in each of the following distances for the Games through the 2015 ICF Canoe Sprint World Championships. Meanwhile, two additional boats (women's K-1 200 m and women's K-1 500 m) were awarded to the German squad by virtue of a top two national finish at the 2016 European Qualification Regatta in Duisburg, Germany.

A total of 11 sprint canoeists (six men and five women), highlighted by London 2012 champions Sebastian Brendel (men's C-1 1000 m) and women's kayak duo Tina Dietze and Franziska Weber, were named as part of the second batch of nominated athletes to the German roster for the Games on 28 June 2016.

Men

Athlete	Event	Heats		Semifinals		Final	
Athlete	Event	Time	Rank	Time	Rank	Time	Rank
Sebastian Brendel	C-1 1000 m	3:58.44	1 FA	Bye		3:56.926	1st place, gold medalist(s)
Max Hoff	K-1 1000 m	3:33.585	2 Q	3:36.136	2 FA	3:37.581	7
Stefan Kiraj	C-1 200 m	41.198	5 Q	43.171	6	Did not advance	
Ronald Rauhe	K-1 200 m	34.350	1 Q	34.180	2 FA	35.662	3rd place, bronze medalist(s)
Sebastian Brendel; Jan Vandrey	C-2 1000 m	3:33.482	1 FA	Bye		3:43.912	1st place, gold medalist(s)
Marcus Groß; Max Rendschmidt	K-2 1000 m	3:19.258	1 FA	Bye		3:10.781	1st place, gold medalist(s)
Tom Liebscher; Ronald Rauhe	K-2 200 m	31.572	4 Q	32.061	2 FA	32.488	5
Marcus Groß; Max Hoff; Tom Liebscher; Max Rendschmidt	K-4 1000 m	2:52.836	1 FA	Bye		3:02.143	1st place, gold medalist(s)

Women

Athlete	Event	Heats		Semifinals		Final	
Athlete	Event	Time	Rank	Time	Rank	Time	Rank
Conny Waßmuth	K-1 200 m	41.972	5 Q	41.725	6	Did not advance	
Franziska Weber	K-1 500 m	1:56.601	4 Q	1:56.515	1 FA	1:54.553	5
Tina Dietze; Franziska Weber	K-2 500 m	1:42.184	1 FA	Bye		1:43.738	2nd place, silver medalist(s)
Tina Dietze; Sabrina Hering; Steffi Kriegerstein; Franziska Weber	K-4 500 m	1:33.185	3 Q	1:34.710	1 FA	1:15.094	2nd place, silver medalist(s)

Qualification Legend: FA = Qualify to final (medal); FB = Qualify to final B (non-medal)

== Cycling ==
=== Road ===
German riders qualified for the following quota places in the men's and women's Olympic road race by virtue of their top 15 final national ranking in the 2015 UCI World Tour (for men) and top 22 in the UCI World Ranking (for women). The road cycling team, highlighted by London 2012 time trial runner-up Tony Martin, was named to the Olympic roster on 25 June 2016.

Men

Athlete	Event	Time	Rank
Emanuel Buchmann	Road race	6:13:03	14
Simon Geschke	Road race	Did not finish	
Simon Geschke	Time trial	1:15:49.88	13
Maximilian Levy	Road race	Did not finish	
Tony Martin	Road race	Did not finish	
Tony Martin	Time trial	1:15:33.75	12

Women

Athlete	Event	Time	Rank
Lisa Brennauer	Road race	3:56:34	19
Lisa Brennauer	Time trial	45:22.62	8
Romy Kasper	Road race	4:02:07	44
Claudia Lichtenberg	Road race	3:58:03	31
Trixi Worrack	Road race	4:01:33	43
Trixi Worrack	Time trial	46:52.77	16

=== Track ===
Following the completion of the 2016 UCI Track Cycling World Championships, German riders have accumulated spots in both men's and women's team pursuit, and men's and women's team sprint, as well as both the men's and women's omnium. As a result of their place in the men's and women's team sprint, Germany has won the right to enter two riders in both men's and women's sprint and men's and women's keirin.

Deutscher Olympischer Sportbund (DOSB) announced the full track cycling squad, as part of the first batch of nominated German athletes, on 31 May 2016. Among these cyclists featured defending Olympic champions Kristina Vogel and Miriam Welte in women's team sprint. Henning Bommel (men's team pursuit) and Anna Knauer (women's Omnium) rounded out the lineup on 28 June 2016.

Sprint

Athlete	Event	Qualification		Round 1	Repechage 1	Round 2	Repechage 2	Quarterfinals	Semifinals	Final	
Athlete	Event	Time Speed (km/h)	Rank	Opposition Time Speed (km/h)	Opposition Time Speed (km/h)	Opposition Time Speed (km/h)	Opposition Time Speed (km/h)	Opposition Time Speed (km/h)	Opposition Time Speed (km/h)	Opposition Time Speed (km/h)	Rank
Joachim Eilers	Men's sprint	9.908; 72.668	12 Q	Zieliński (POL); W 10.428; 69.044	Bye	Xu C (CHN); W 10.449; 68.906	Bye	Glaetzer (AUS); L, L	Did not advance	5th place final Constable (AUS); Xu C (CHN); Baugé (FRA); W 10.525	5
Maximilian Levy	Men's sprint	10.035; 71.748	18 Q	Kenny (GBR); L	Phillip (TRI); Dawkins (NZL); W 10.536; 69.524	Glaetzer (AUS); L	Constable (AUS); Hoogland (NED); L	Did not advance		9th place final Hoogland (NED); Webster (NZL); Puerta (COL); W 10.275	9
Kristina Vogel	Women's sprint	10.865; 66.267	6 Q	van Riessen (NED); W 11.279; 63.835	Bye	Hansen (NZL); W 11.197; 64.302	Bye	Lee W S (HKG); W 11.230, W 11.373	Marchant (GBR); W 11.302, W 11.153	James (GBR); W 11.237, W 11.312	1st place, gold medalist(s)
Miriam Welte	Women's sprint	11.038; 65.229	14 Q	Zhong Ts (CHN); L	O'Brien (CAN); Sullivan (CAN); W 11.466; 62.794	Marchant (GBR); L	Zhong Ts (CHN); Meares (AUS); L	Did not advance		9th place final Meares (AUS); Cueff (FRA); Hansen (NZL); L	11

Team sprint

Athlete	Event	Qualification		Semifinals		Final	
Athlete	Event	Time Speed (km/h)	Rank	Opposition Time Speed (km/h)	Rank	Opposition Time Speed (km/h)	Rank
Joachim Eilers; René Enders; Maximilian Levy	Men's team sprint	43.711; 61.769	7 Q	New Zealand; L 43.455; 62.133	5	Did not advance	
Kristina Vogel; Miriam Welte	Women's team sprint	32.673; 55.091	3 Q	France; W 32.806; 54.868	4 Q	Australia; W 32.636; 55.153	3rd place, bronze medalist(s)

Pursuit

Athlete	Event	Qualification		Semifinals		Final	
Athlete	Event	Time	Rank	Opponent Results	Rank	Opponent Results	Rank
Henning Bommel; Nils Schomber; Kersten Thiele; Domenic Weinstein	Men's team pursuit	4:00.911	6 Q	Switzerland; 3:56.903	6	Italy; 3:59.485	5
Charlotte Becker; Mieke Kröger; Stephanie Pohl; Gudrun Stock	Women's team pursuit	4:30.068	9	Did not advance			

Keirin

Athlete	Event	1st Round	Repechage	2nd Round	Final
Athlete	Event	Rank	Rank	Rank	Rank
Joachim Eilers	Men's keirin	2 Q	Bye	1 Q	4
Maximilian Levy	Men's keirin	3 R	4	Did not advance	
Kristina Vogel	Women's keirin	1 Q	Bye	1 Q	6
Miriam Welte	Women's keirin	7 R	5	Did not advance	

Omnium

Athlete	Event	Scratch race		Individual pursuit			Elimination race		Time trial			Flying lap			Points race		Total points	Rank
Athlete	Event	Rank	Points	Time	Rank	Points	Rank	Points	Time	Rank	Points	Time	Rank	Points	Points	Rank	Total points	Rank
Roger Kluge	Men's omnium	2	38	4:18.907	4	34	12	18	1:03.797	9	24	13.332	11	20	33	3	167	6
Anna Knauer	Women's omnium	16	10	3:42.987	13	16	8	26	36.370	10	22	14.447	10	22	3	11	99	13

=== Mountain biking ===
German mountain bikers qualified for two men's and two women's quota places into the Olympic cross-country race, as a result of the nation's sixth-place finish for men and second for women in the UCI Olympic Ranking List of 25 May 2016. The mountain biking team was named to the Olympic roster on 13 June 2016, with three-time medalist Sabine Spitz riding in the cross-country race at her fifth straight Games.

Athlete	Event	Time	Rank
Manuel Fumic	Men's cross-country	1:37:39	13
Moritz Milatz	Men's cross-country	1:43:14	28
Helen Grobert	Women's cross-country	1:34:08	12
Sabine Spitz	Women's cross-country	1:39:16	19

=== BMX ===
German riders qualified for one men's and one women's quota place in BMX at the Olympics, as a result of the nation's top three finish for men in the UCI BMX Individual Ranking List of 31 May 2016 and top two for women, not yet qualified, at the 2016 UCI BMX World Championships. London 2012 Olympian Luis Brethauer and BMX rookie Nadja Pries were named to the German cycling team.

Athlete	Event	Seeding		Quarterfinal		Semifinal		Final	
Athlete	Event	Result	Rank	Points	Rank	Points	Rank	Result	Rank
Luis Brethauer	Men's BMX	35.379	15	7	2 Q	23	8	Did not advance	
Nadja Pries	Women's BMX	37.152	14	—N/a		19	7	Did not advance	

== Diving ==
German divers qualified for five individual spots and three synchronized teams at the Olympics through the 2015 FINA World Championships and the 2016 FINA World Cup series. A total of eight divers (four per gender), highlighted by Beijing 2008 silver medalists Patrick Hausding and Sascha Klein in men's synchronized platform, were named as part of the second batch of nominated German athletes to the Olympic roster on 28 June 2016.

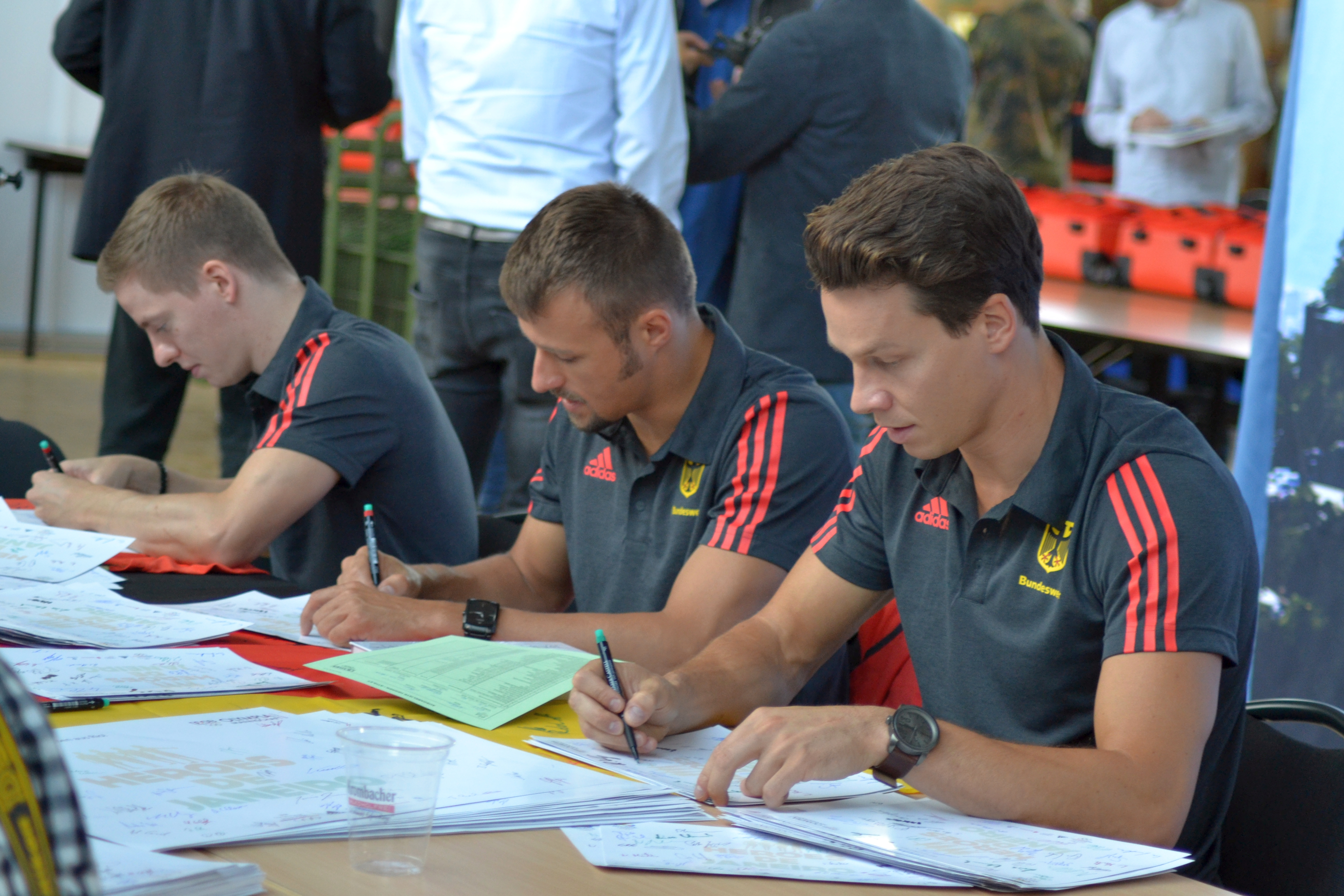
Martin Wolfram, Sascha Klein and Patrick Hausding (from left) at the Clothing of the German Olympic team.

Men

Athlete	Event	Preliminaries		Semifinals		Final	
Athlete	Event	Points	Rank	Points	Rank	Points	Rank
Stephan Feck	3 m springboard	423.50	9 Q	354.20	17	Did not advance	
Patrick Hausding	3 m springboard	440.00	6 Q	413.50	10 Q	498.90	3rd place, bronze medalist(s)
Sascha Klein	10 m platform	463.40	7 Q	475.00	5 Q	424.15	9
Martin Wolfram	10 m platform	468.80	6 Q	466.15	8 Q	492.90	5
Stephan Feck; Patrick Hausding	3 m synchronized springboard	—N/a				410.10	4
Patrick Hausding; Sascha Klein	10 m synchronized platform	—N/a				438.42	4

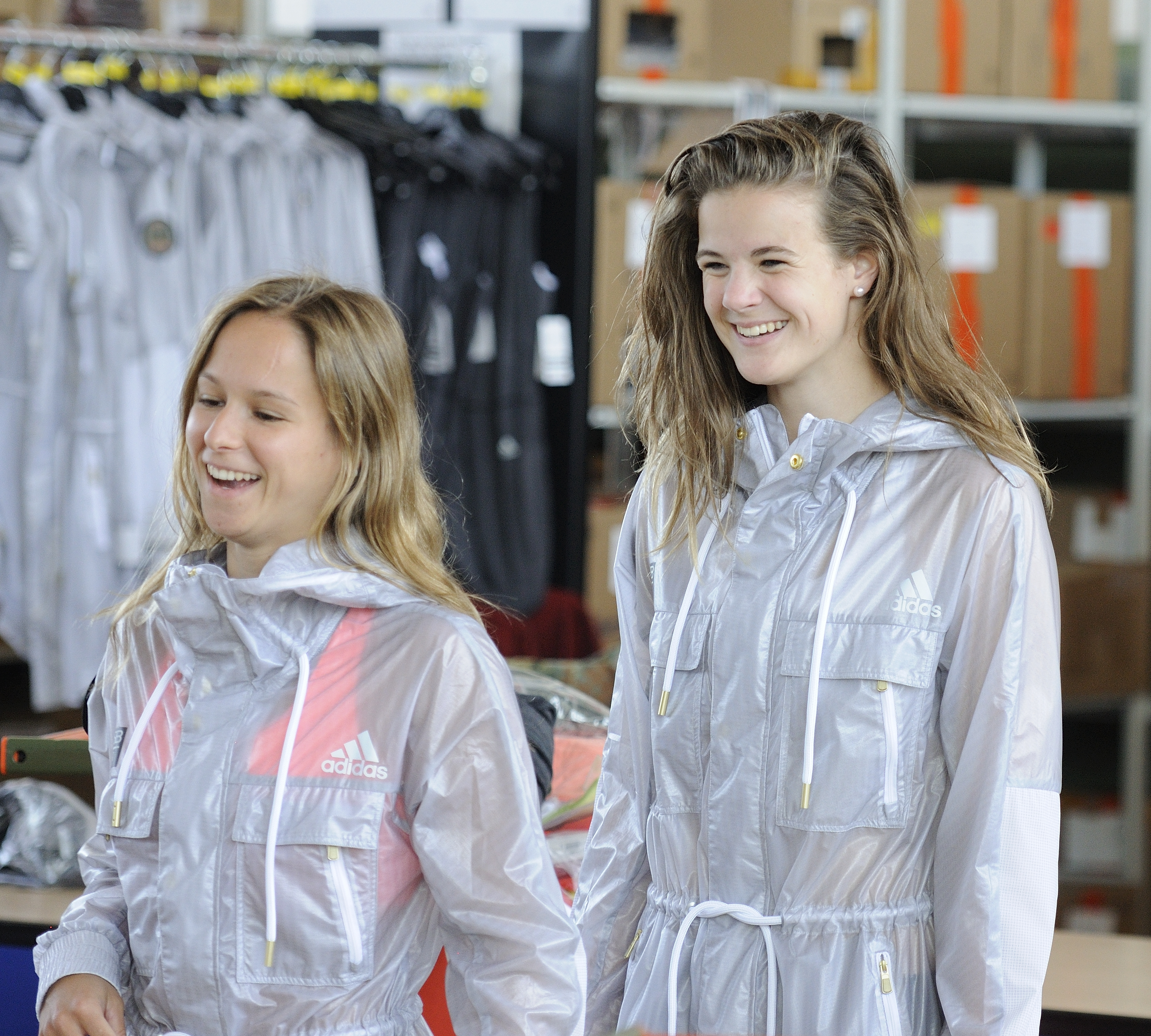
Elena Wassen and Maria Kurjo (from right) at the Clothing of the German Olympic team.

Women

Athlete	Event	Preliminaries		Semifinals		Final	
Athlete	Event	Points	Rank	Points	Rank	Points	Rank
Tina Punzel	3 m springboard	307.95	13 Q	291.60	17	Did not advance	
Nora Subschinski	3 m springboard	302.05	16 Q	308.25	12 Q	317.10	9
Maria Kurjo	10 m platform	287.00	21	Did not advance			
Elena Wassen	10 m platform	291.90	16 Q	276.70	17	Did not advance	
Tina Punzel; Nora Subschinski	3 m synchronized springboard	—N/a				284.25	7

== Equestrian ==
Germany became one of the first three nations to earn places at the Games, qualifying a complete team in dressage by winning the team event at the 2014 FEI World Equestrian Games. The German eventing team also qualified for Rio by winning the gold medal at the same World Games.

=== Dressage ===
Athlete	Horse	Event	Grand Prix		Grand Prix Special		Grand Prix Freestyle		Overall	
Athlete	Horse	Event	Score	Rank	Score	Rank	Technical	Artistic	Score	Rank
Kristina Bröring-Sprehe	Desperados	Individual	82.257	2 Q	81.401	4 Q	83.714	90.571	87.142	3rd place, bronze medalist(s)
Sönke Rothenberger	Cosmo	Individual	77.329	7 Q	76.261	10	Did not advance			
Dorothee Schneider	Showtime	Individual	80.986	4 Q	82.619	3 Q	79.607	86.285	82.946	6
Isabell Werth	Weihegold	Individual	81.029	3 Q	83.711	1 Q	85.285	92.857	89.071	2nd place, silver medalist(s)
Kristina Bröring-Sprehe; Sönke Rothenberger; Dorothee Schneider; Isabell Werth	See above	Team	81.295	1 Q	81.936	1	—N/a		81.936	1st place, gold medalist(s)

=== Eventing ===
Athlete	Horse	Event	Dressage		Cross-country			Jumping						Total	
Athlete	Horse	Event	Dressage		Cross-country			Qualifier/Team final			Final			Total	
Athlete	Horse	Event	Penalties	Rank	Penalties	Total	Rank	Penalties	Total	Rank	Penalties	Total	Rank	Penalties	Rank
Sandra Auffarth	Opgun Louvo	Individual	41.60	8	24.80	66.40	20	0.00	66.40	17	0.00	66.40	11	66.40	11
Michael Jung	Sam	Individual	40.90	5	0.00	40.90	2	0.00	40.90	1	0.00	40.90	1	40.90	1st place, gold medalist(s)
Ingrid Klimke	Hale Bob	Individual	39.50	4	26.00	65.50	19	0.00	65.50	15	4.00	69.50	14	69.50	14
Julia Krajewski	Samourai du Thot	Individual	44.80 #	18	Eliminated			Did not advance							
Sandra Auffarth; Michael Jung; Ingrid Klimke; Julia Krajewski	See above	Team	122.00	4	50.80	172.80	4	0.00	172.80	2	—N/a			172.80	2nd place, silver medalist(s)

"#" indicates that the score of this rider does not count in the team competition, since only the best three results of a team are counted.

=== Jumping ===
Athlete	Horse	Event	Qualification								Final					Total	
Athlete	Horse	Event	Round 1		Round 2			Round 3			Round A		Round B			Total	
Athlete	Horse	Event	Penalties	Rank	Penalties	Total	Rank	Penalties	Total	Rank	Penalties	Rank	Penalties	Total	Rank	Penalties	Rank
Christian Ahlmann	Taloubet	Individual	0	=1 Q	0	0	=1 Q	4	4	=7 Q	0	1 Q	4	4	=14	4	=9
Ludger Beerbaum	Chiara	Individual	4 #	=27 Q	4 #	8	=30 Q	0	8	=18*	Did not advance						
Daniel Deusser	First Class	Individual	0	=1 Q	0	0	=1 Q	4	4	=7 Q	0	1 Q	4	4	=14	4	=9
Meredith Michaels-Beerbaum	Fibonacci	Individual	0	=1 Q	0	0	=1 Q	5 #	5	=13 Q	EL		Did not advance				
Christian Ahlmann; Ludger Beerbaum; Daniel Deusser; Meredith Michaels-Beerbaum	See above	Team	0	=1	0	—N/a	=1 Q	8	8	=3	—N/a					8	3rd place, bronze medalist(s)

"#" indicates that the score of this rider does not count in the team competition, since only the best three results of a team are counted.

== Fencing ==
Germany has entered four fencers into the Olympic competition. Max Hartung and Matyas Szabo (both in men's sabre), along with Carolin Golubytskyi in the women's foil, had claimed their Olympic spots on the German team by finishing among the top 14 individuals in the FIE Adjusted Official Rankings. They were joined by Peter Joppich, who has been set to compete at his fourth Olympics as one of the two highest-ranked fencers coming from the Europe zone in the men's foil.

Athlete	Event	Round of 64	Round of 32	Round of 16	Quarterfinal	Semifinal	Final / BM	
Athlete	Event	Opposition Score	Opposition Score	Opposition Score	Opposition Score	Opposition Score	Opposition Score	Rank
Peter Joppich	Men's foil	Bye	Lefort (FRA); W 15–13	Avola (ITA); L 13–15	Did not advance			
Max Hartung	Men's sabre	—N/a	Apithy (BEN); W 15–9	Homer (USA); L 12–15	Did not advance			
Matyas Szabo	Men's sabre	—N/a	Pakdaman (IRI); W 15–11	Paskov (BUL); W 15–6	Homer (USA); L 12–15	Did not advance		
Carolin Golubytskyi	Women's foil	Bye	Łyczbińska (POL); L 9–14	Did not advance				

== Field hockey ==
Summary

Key:

- FT – After full time.
- P – Match decided by penalty-shootout.

Team	Event	Group stage						Quarterfinal	Semifinal	Final / BM	
Team	Event	Opposition Score	Opposition Score	Opposition Score	Opposition Score	Opposition Score	Rank	Opposition Score	Opposition Score	Opposition Score	Rank
Germany men's	Men's tournament	Canada; W 6–2	India; W 2–1	Ireland; W 3–2	Argentina; D 4–4	Netherlands; W 2–1	1	New Zealand; W 3–2	Argentina; L 2–5	Netherlands; W 4–3^{P} FT: 1–1	3rd place, bronze medalist(s)
Germany women's	Women's tournament	China; D 1–1	New Zealand; W 2–1	South Korea; W 2–0	Spain; L 1–2	Netherlands; L 0–2	3	United States; W 2–1	Netherlands; L 3–4^{P} FT: 1–1	New Zealand; W 2–1	3rd place, bronze medalist(s)

=== Men's tournament ===
Germany's men's field hockey team qualified for the Olympics by having achieved a top three finish at the 2014–15 Men's FIH Hockey World League Semifinals.

Team roster

The following is the German roster in the men's field hockey tournament of the 2016 Summer Olympics.

Head coach: Valentin Altenburg

1. Nicolas Jacobi (GK)
2. Mathias Müller
3. Linus Butt
6. Martin Häner (C)
7. Moritz Trompertz
8. Mats Grambusch
10. Christopher Wesley
12. Timm Herzbruch
13. Tobias Hauke
15. Tom Grambusch
17. Christopher Rühr
20. Martin Zwicker
21. Moritz Fürste
23. Florian Fuchs
27. Timur Oruz
29. Niklas Wellen

Reserves:

- Tobias Walter (GK)
- Oskar Deecke
- Oliver Korn

Group play

Pos	Team	Pld	W	D	L	GF	GA	GD	Pts	Qualification
1	Germany	5	4	1	0	17	10	+7	13	Quarter-finals
2	Netherlands	5	3	1	1	18	6	+12	10	Quarter-finals
3	Argentina	5	2	2	1	14	12	+2	8	Quarter-finals
4	India	5	2	1	2	9	9	0	7	Quarter-finals
5	Ireland	5	1	0	4	10	16	−6	3	
6	Canada	5	0	1	4	7	22	−15	1	

Source: Rio2016
Rules for classification: 1) Points; 2) Matches won; 3) Goal difference; 4) Goals for; 5) Head-to-head result.

6 August 2016
18:00

Canada	2–6	Germany
Pearson 11'; Pereira 39'	Report	Fürste 4', 33'; Wellen 6', 46'; Müller 14'; Butt 26'

Umpires:
Marcelo Servetto (ESP)
Simon Taylor (NZL)

8 August 2016
11:00

Germany	2–1	India
Wellen 18'; Rühr 60'	Report	Ru. Singh 23'

Umpires:
Tim Pullman (AUS)
Martin Madden (GBR)

9 August 2016
12:30

Germany	3–2	Ireland
Fürste 13', 38'; Zwicker 42'	Report	Magee 26'; Darling 59'

Umpires:
Marcelo Servetto (ESP)
Lim Hong Zhen (SIN)

11 August 2016
12:30

Argentina	4–4	Germany
Vila 4'; P. Ibarra 29'; Peillat 48'; M. Rey 57'	Report	Herzbruch 15'; Wesley 24'; Grambusch 28'; Müller 60'

Umpires:
Adam Kearns (AUS)
Paco Vázquez (ESP)

12 August 2016
13:30

Germany	2–1	Netherlands
Fuchs 7'; Grambusch 33'	Report	Van As 44'

Umpires:
Murray Grime (AUS)
Marcelo Servetto (ESP)

Quarterfinal

14 August 2016
20:30

Germany	3–2	New Zealand
Fürste 56', 60'; Fuchs 60'	Report	Inglis 18'; McAleese 49'

Umpires:
Marcelo Servetto (ESP)
Murray Grime (AUS)

Semifinal

16 August 2016
12:00

Argentina	5–2	Germany
Peillat 9', 12', 28'; Menini 36'; Vila 47'	Report	Fürste 51'; Rühr 58'

Umpires:
Marcin Grochal (POL)
John Wright (RSA)

Bronze medal match

18 August 2016
12:00

Netherlands	1–1	Germany
Croon 35'	Report	M. Grambusch 42'
Penalties
Bakker (penalty shoot-out missed); Kemperman (penalty shoot-out scored); Hertzberger (penalty shoot-out scored); Van Ass (penalty shoot-out scored); De Wijn (penalty shoot-out missed)	3–4	(penalty shoot-out scored) Hauke; (penalty shoot-out scored) M. Grambusch; (penalty shoot-out scored) Herzbruch; (penalty shoot-out scored) Butt

Umpires:
Marcelo Servetto (ESP)
Martin Madden (GBR)

=== Women's tournament ===
The German women's field hockey team qualified for the Olympics by having achieved a top three finish at the 2014–15 Women's FIH Hockey World League Semifinals.

Team roster

The following is the German roster in the women's field hockey tournament of the 2016 Summer Olympics. Annika Sprink was replaced due to an injury by Katharina Otte on 18 August 2016.

Head coach: Jamilon Mülders

4. Nike Lorenz
5. Selin Oruz
8. Anne Schröder
11. Lisa Schütze
12. Charlotte Stapenhorst
13. Katharina Otte
14. Janne Müller-Wieland
15. Hannah Krüger
17. Jana Teschke
18. Lisa Hahn
21. Franzisca Hauke
22. Cécile Pieper
23. Marie Mävers
24. Annika Sprink
28. Julia Müller
29. Pia-Sophie Oldhafer
32. Kristina Reynolds (GK)

Reserves

- Yvonne Frank (GK)

Group play

Pos	Team	Pld	W	D	L	GF	GA	GD	Pts	Qualification
1	Netherlands	5	4	1	0	13	1	+12	13	Quarter-finals
2	New Zealand	5	3	1	1	11	5	+6	10	Quarter-finals
3	Germany	5	2	1	2	6	6	0	7	Quarter-finals
4	Spain	5	2	0	3	6	12	−6	6	Quarter-finals
5	China	5	1	2	2	3	5	−2	5	
6	South Korea	5	0	1	4	3	13	−10	1	

Source: Rio2016
Rules for classification: 1) Points; 2) Matches won; 3) Goal difference; 4) Goals for; 5) Head-to-head result.

7 August 2016
13:30

China	1–1	Germany
Peng 28'	Report	Hahn 5'

Umpires:
Melissa Trivic (AUS)
Sarah Wilson (GBR)

8 August 2016
13:30

New Zealand	1–2	Germany
Webster 10'	Report	Oldhafer 22'; Schröder 44'

Umpires:
Soledad Iparraguiree (ARG)
Miao Lin (CHN)

10 August 2016
12:30

Germany	2–0	South Korea
Krüger 55'; Hahn 59'	Report

Umpires:
Michelle Joubert (RSA)
Kylie Seymour (AUS)

11 August 2016
17:00

Germany	1–2	Spain
Schütze 21'	Report	Guinea 9'; Salvatella 11'

Umpires:
Fanneke Alkemade (NED)
Miao Lin (CHN)

13 August 2016
12:30

Netherlands	2–0	Germany
De Waard 5'; Van Male 44'	Report

Umpires:
Soledad Iparraguirre (ARG)
Melissa Trivic (AUS)

Quarterfinal

15 August 2016
12:30

United States	1–2	Germany
Falgowski 57'	Report	Mävers 8'; Hahn 14'

Umpires:
Carolina de la Fuente (ARG)
Miao Lin (CHN)

Semifinal

17 August 2016
12:00

Netherlands	1–1	Germany
Paumen 16'	Report	Schütze 11'
Penalties
Bos (penalty shoot-out scored); Hoog (penalty shoot-out missed); Keetels (penalty shoot-out missed); Van Geffen (penalty shoot-out scored); Jonker (penalty shoot-out missed); Bos (penalty shoot-out scored); Hoog (penalty shoot-out scored)	4–3	(penalty shoot-out scored) Müller-Wieland; (penalty shoot-out scored) Mävers; (penalty shoot-out missed) Hahn; (penalty shoot-out missed) Teschke; (penalty shoot-out missed) Hauke; (penalty shoot-out scored) Müller-Wieland; (penalty shoot-out missed) Mävers

Umpires:
Laurine Delforge (BEL)
Soledad Iparraguiree (ARG)

Bronze medal match

19 August 2016
12:00

Germany	2–1	New Zealand
Stapenhorst 34'; Schütze 38'	Report	Merry 45+'

Umpires:
Irene Presenqui (ARG)
Sarah Wilson (GBR)

== Football ==
=== Summary ===
Key:

- A.E.T – After extra time.
- P – Match decided by penalty-shootout.

Team	Event	Group stage				Quarterfinal	Semifinal	Final / BM	
Team	Event	Opposition Score	Opposition Score	Opposition Score	Rank	Opposition Score	Opposition Score	Opposition Score	Rank
Germany men's	Men's tournament	Mexico; D 2–2	South Korea; D 3–3	Fiji; W 10–0	2	Portugal; W 4–0	Nigeria; W 2–0	Brazil; L 4–5^{P} 1–1 (a.e.t.)	2nd place, silver medalist(s)
Germany women's	Women's tournament	Zimbabwe; W 6–1	Australia; D 2–2	Canada; L 1–2	2	China; W 1–0	Canada; W 2–0	Sweden; W 2–1	1st place, gold medalist(s)

=== Men's tournament ===
Germany's men's football team qualified for the Olympics by reaching the semifinals at the 2015 UEFA European Under-21 Championship in the Czech Republic.

Team roster

The following is the Germany final squad in the men's football tournament of the 2016 Summer Olympics. Leon Goretzka, the team captain, was injured in the first match of the tournament, though no alternate was initially used. However, he was later replaced by goalkeeper Eric Oelschlägel for only the gold medal match.

Head coach: Horst Hrubesch

No.	Pos.	Player	Date of birth (age)	Caps	Goals	2016 club
1	GK	Timo Horn	12 May 1993 (aged 23)	0	0	(German Football Association) 1. FC Köln
2	MF	Jeremy Toljan	8 August 1994 (aged 21)	0	0	(German Football Association) 1899 Hoffenheim
3	DF	Lukas Klostermann	3 June 1996 (aged 20)	0	0	(German Football Association) RB Leipzig
4	DF	Matthias Ginter	19 January 1994 (aged 22)	9	0	(German Football Association) Borussia Dortmund
5	DF	Niklas Süle	3 September 1995 (aged 20)	0	0	(German Football Association) 1899 Hoffenheim
6	MF	Sven Bender*	27 April 1989 (aged 27)	7	0	(German Football Association) Borussia Dortmund
7	MF	Max Meyer (c)	18 September 1995 (aged 20)	1	0	(German Football Association) Schalke 04
8	MF	Lars Bender*	27 April 1989 (aged 27)	19	4	(German Football Association) Bayer Leverkusen
9	FW	Davie Selke	20 January 1995 (aged 21)	0	0	(German Football Association) RB Leipzig
10	MF	Leon Goretzka (c)	6 February 1995 (aged 21)	1	0	(German Football Association) Schalke 04
11	MF	Julian Brandt	2 May 1996 (aged 20)	1	0	(German Football Association) Bayer Leverkusen
12	GK	Jannik Huth	15 April 1994 (aged 22)	0	0	(German Football Association) Mainz 05
13	DF	Philipp Max	30 September 1993 (aged 22)	0	0	(German Football Association) FC Augsburg
14	DF	Robert Bauer	9 April 1995 (aged 21)	0	0	(German Football Association) FC Ingolstadt
15	MF	Max Christiansen	25 September 1996 (aged 19)	0	0	(German Football Association) FC Ingolstadt
16	MF	Grischa Prömel	9 January 1995 (aged 21)	0	0	(German Football Association) Karlsruher SC
17	MF	Serge Gnabry	14 July 1995 (aged 21)	0	0	(The Football Association) Arsenal
18	FW	Nils Petersen*	6 December 1988 (aged 27)	0	0	(German Football Association) SC Freiburg
22	GK	Eric Oelschlägel	20 September 1995 (aged 20)	0	0	(German Football Association) Werder Bremen

* Over-aged player.

Group play

Pos	Team	Pld	W	D	L	GF	GA	GD	Pts	Qualification
1	South Korea	3	2	1	0	12	3	+9	7	Quarter-finals
2	Germany	3	1	2	0	15	5	+10	5	Quarter-finals
3	Mexico	3	1	1	1	7	4	+3	4	
4	Fiji	3	0	0	3	1	23	−22	0	

Source: Rio2016 & FIFA
Rules for classification: Tiebreakers
4 August 2016
17:00

Mexico	2–2	Germany
Peralta 52'; Pizarro 60'	Report (Rio2016); Report (FIFA)	Gnabry 58'; Ginter 78'

Itaipava Arena Fonte Nova, Salvador
Attendance: 16,500
Referee: Alireza Faghani (Iran)

7 August 2016
16:00

Germany	3–3	South Korea
Gnabry 33', 90+2'; Selke 55'	Report (Rio2016); Report (FIFA)	Hwang Hee-chan 25'; Son Heung-min 57'; Suk Hyun-jun 87'

Itaipava Arena Fonte Nova, Salvador
Attendance: 17,121
Referee: Néstor Pitana (Argentina)

10 August 2016
16:00

Germany	10–0	Fiji
Gnabry 8', 45'; Petersen 14', 33', 40', 63' (pen.), 70'; Meyer 30', 49', 52'	Report (Rio2016); Report (FIFA)

Mineirão, Belo Horizonte
Attendance: 16,521
Referee: Fahad Al-Mirdasi (Saudi Arabia)

Quarterfinal

13 August 2016
13:00

Portugal	0–4	Germany
	Report (Rio2016); Report (FIFA)	Gnabry 45+1'; Ginter 57'; Selke 75'; Max 87'

Estádio Nacional Mané Garrincha, Brasília
Attendance: 55,412
Referee: Walter López Castellanos (Guatemala)

Semifinal

17 August 2016
16:00

Nigeria	0–2	Germany
	Report (Rio2016); Report (FIFA)	Klostermann 9'; Petersen 89'

Arena Corinthians, São Paulo
Attendance: 35,562
Referee: Néstor Pitana (Argentina)

Gold medal match

20 August 2016
17:30

Brazil	1–1 (a.e.t.)	Germany
Neymar 27'	Report (Rio2016); Report (ESPN)	Meyer 59'
Penalties
Renato Augusto (penalty scored); Marquinhos (penalty scored); Rafinha (penalty scored); Luan Vieira (penalty scored); Neymar (penalty scored)	5–4	(penalty scored) Ginter; (penalty scored) Gnabry; (penalty scored) Brandt; (penalty scored) Süle; (penalty missed) Petersen

Maracanã Stadium, Rio de Janeiro
Attendance: 63,707
Referee: Alireza Faghani (Iran)

=== Women's tournament ===
The German women's football team qualified for the Olympics by reaching the top three for European teams at the 2015 FIFA Women's World Cup in Canada.

Team roster

Head coach: Silvia Neid

Germany named a squad of 18 players and 4 alternates for the tournament, which was announced on 15 July 2016. During the tournament, Svenja Huth replaced Simone Laudehr on 11 August 2016 due to injury.

No.	Pos.	Player	Date of birth (age)	Caps	Goals	Club
1	GK	Almuth Schult	9 February 1991 (aged 25)	28	0	(German Football Association) VfL Wolfsburg
2	DF	Josephine Henning	8 September 1989 (aged 26)	28	0	(The Football Association) Arsenal
3	DF	Saskia Bartusiak (captain)	9 September 1982 (aged 33)	94	1	(German Football Association) 1. FFC Frankfurt
4	DF	Leonie Maier	29 September 1992 (aged 23)	40	6	(German Football Association) Bayern Munich
5	DF	Annike Krahn	1 July 1985 (aged 31)	130	5	(German Football Association) Bayer Leverkusen
6	MF	Simone Laudehr	12 July 1986 (aged 30)	97	26	(German Football Association) Bayern Munich
7	MF	Melanie Behringer	18 November 1985 (aged 30)	116	29	(German Football Association) Bayern Munich
8	MF	Lena Goeßling	8 March 1986 (aged 30)	86	10	(German Football Association) VfL Wolfsburg
9	FW	Alexandra Popp	6 April 1991 (aged 25)	67	33	(German Football Association) VfL Wolfsburg
10	FW	Dzsenifer Marozsán	18 April 1992 (aged 24)	59	27	(French Football Federation) Olympique Lyon
11	FW	Anja Mittag	16 May 1985 (aged 31)	137	42	(French Football Federation) Paris Saint-Germain
12	DF	Tabea Kemme	14 December 1991 (aged 24)	28	1	(German Football Association) Turbine Potsdam
13	MF	Sara Däbritz	15 February 1995 (aged 21)	30	4	(German Football Association) Bayern Munich
14	DF	Babett Peter	12 May 1988 (aged 28)	96	5	(German Football Association) VfL Wolfsburg
15	FW	Mandy Islacker	8 August 1988 (aged 27)	7	2	(German Football Association) 1. FFC Frankfurt
16	MF	Melanie Leupolz	14 April 1994 (aged 22)	41	7	(German Football Association) Bayern Munich
17	MF	Isabel Kerschowski	22 January 1988 (aged 28)	7	3	(German Football Association) VfL Wolfsburg
18	GK	Laura Benkarth	14 October 1992 (aged 23)	2	0	(German Football Association) SC Freiburg
19	MF	Svenja Huth	25 January 1991 (aged 25)	20	0	(German Football Association) Turbine Potsdam

Group play

Pos	Team	Pld	W	D	L	GF	GA	GD	Pts	Qualification
1	Canada	3	3	0	0	7	2	+5	9	Quarter-finals
2	Germany	3	1	1	1	9	5	+4	4	Quarter-finals
3	Australia	3	1	1	1	8	5	+3	4	Quarter-finals
4	Zimbabwe	3	0	0	3	3	15	−12	0	

Source: Rio2016 & FIFA
Rules for classification: Tiebreakers
3 August 2016
18:00

Zimbabwe	1–6	Germany
Basopo 50'	Report (Rio2016); Report (FIFA)	Däbritz 22'; Popp 36'; Behringer 53', 78'; Leupolz 83'; Chibanda 90' (o.g.)

Arena Corinthians, São Paulo
Attendance: 20,521
Referee: Rita Gani (Malaysia)

6 August 2016
18:00

Germany	2–2	Australia
Däbritz 45+2'; Bartusiak 88'	Report (Rio2016); Report (FIFA)	Kerr 6'; Foord 45'

Arena Corinthians, São Paulo
Attendance: 37,475
Referee: Anna-Marie Keighley (New Zealand)

9 August 2016
16:00

Australia	6–1	Zimbabwe
De Vanna 2'; Polkinghorne 15'; Kennedy 37'; Simon 50'; Heyman 55', 66'	Report (Rio2016); Report (FIFA)	Msipa 90+1'

Itaipava Arena Fonte Nova, Salvador
Attendance: 5,115
Referee: Esther Staubli (Switzerland)

Quarterfinal

12 August 2016
16:00

China	0–1	Germany
	Report (Rio2016); Report (FIFA)	Behringer 76'

Itaipava Arena Fonte Nova, Salvador
Attendance: 9,642
Referee: Kateryna Monzul (Ukraine)

Semifinal

16 August 2016
16:00

Canada	0–2	Germany
	Report (Rio2016); Report (FIFA)	Behringer 21' (pen.); Däbritz 59'

Mineirão, Belo Horizonte
Attendance: 5,641
Referee: Ri Hyang-ok (North Korea)

Final

19 August 2016
17:30

Sweden	1–2	Germany
Blackstenius 67'	Report (Rio2016); Report (FIFA); Report	Marozsán 48'; Sembrant 62' (o.g.)

Maracanã Stadium, Rio de Janeiro
Attendance: 52,432
Referee: Carol Chenard (Canada)

== Golf ==
Germany has entered four golfers (two per gender) into the Olympic tournament. Alex Čejka (world no. 143), Martin Kaymer (world no. 52), Sandra Gal (world no. 55), and Caroline Masson (world no. 77) qualified directly among the top 60 eligible players for their respective individual events based on the IGF World Rankings as of 11 July 2016.

Athlete	Event	Round 1	Round 2	Round 3	Round 4	Total		
Athlete	Event	Score	Score	Score	Score	Score	Par	Rank
Alex Čejka	Men's	67	71	74	69	281	−3	=21
Martin Kaymer	Men's	69	72	72	66	279	−5	=15
Sandra Gal	Women's	71	74	69	69	283	−1	=25
Caroline Masson	Women's	69	69	75	69	282	−2	=21

== Gymnastics ==
=== Artistic ===
Germany has fielded a full squad of ten gymnasts (five men and five women) into the Olympic competition. Both men's and women's squads had claimed one of the remaining four spots each in the team all-around at the Olympic Test Event in Rio de Janeiro. The men's and women's artistic gymnastics squads, highlighted by London 2012 silver medalists Marcel Nguyen and three-time Olympian Fabian Hambüchen, were named at the completion of two German Olympic selection trial meets on 10 July 2016.

Men
Team

Athlete	Event	Qualification								Final							
Athlete	Event	Apparatus						Total	Rank	Apparatus						Total	Rank
Athlete	Event	F	PH	R	V	PB	HB	Total	Rank	F	PH	R	V	PB	HB	Total	Rank
Andreas Bretschneider	Team	14.800	13.641	14.158	14.633	14.833	13.633	85.698	24 Q	14.533	13.516	14.466	—N/a	14.466	14.466	—N/a	
Lukas Dauser	Team	—N/a	13.733	13.916	13.833	15.266	—N/a			—N/a	14.066	13.800	14.783	15.500	—N/a	—N/a	
Fabian Hambüchen	Team	14.041	—N/a		15.166	—N/a	15.533 Q	—N/a		14.666	—N/a		15.091	—N/a	15.666	—N/a	
Marcel Nguyen	Team	14.500	13.433	14.733	14.600	15.466	13.366	86.098	22 Q	14.333	13.366	14.866	14.666	15.466	14.400	—N/a	
Andreas Toba	Team	1.633	14.233	—N/a			14.633	—N/a		—N/a						—N/a	
Total	Team	43.341	41.607	42.807	44.399	45.565	43.799	261.518	8 Q	43.352	40.948	43.132	44.540	45.391	43.732	261.095	7

Individual finals

Athlete	Event	Apparatus						Total	Rank
Athlete	Event	F	PH	R	V	PB	HB	Total	Rank
Andreas Bretschneider	All-around	14.733	13.500	13.833	14.533	14.533	13.833	84.965	20
Fabian Hambüchen	Horizontal bar	—N/a					15.766	15.766	1st place, gold medalist(s)
Marcel Nguyen	All-around	14.733	12.666	14.600	14.666	14.900	14.466	86.031	19

Women
Team

Athlete	Event	Qualification						Final					
Athlete	Event	Apparatus				Total	Rank	Apparatus				Total	Rank
Athlete	Event	V	UB	BB	F	Total	Rank	V	UB	BB	F	Total	Rank
Tabea Alt	Team	14.833	14.666	14.233	—N/a			14.800	—N/a	14.600	—N/a	—N/a	
Kim Bùi	Team	—N/a	14.800	—N/a	13.766	—N/a		—N/a	14.900	—N/a	13.466	—N/a	
Pauline Schäfer	Team	14.400	—N/a	14.400	14.300	—N/a		14.266	—N/a	14.500	14.375	—N/a	
Sophie Scheder	Team	13.966	15.433 Q	12.933	13.266	55.598	23 Q	13.933	15.466	—N/a		—N/a	
Elisabeth Seitz	Team	14.100	15.466 Q	13.866	13.666	57.098	10 Q	—N/a	15.533	14.000	13.833	—N/a	
Total	Team	43.333	45.699	42.499	41.732	173.263	6 Q	42.999	45.899	43.100	41.674	173.672	6

Individual finals

Athlete	Event	Apparatus				Total	Rank
Athlete	Event	V	UB	BB	F	Total	Rank
Sophie Scheder	All-around	14.033	13.950	12.666	13.258	53.907	23
Sophie Scheder	Uneven bars	—N/a	15.566	—N/a		15.566	3rd place, bronze medalist(s)
Elisabeth Seitz	All-around	14.100	15.233	13.200	13.833	56.366	17
Elisabeth Seitz	Uneven bars	—N/a	15.533	—N/a		15.533	4

=== Rhythmic ===
Germany has qualified a squad of rhythmic gymnasts in both individual and group all-around for the Games by claiming one of eight available Olympic spots (for individual) and three (for group) at the Olympic Test Event in Rio de Janeiro. The rhythmic gymnastics squad was named to the Olympic roster on 7 July 2016.

Athlete	Event	Qualification						Final					
Athlete	Event	Hoop	Ball	Clubs	Ribbon	Total	Rank	Hoop	Ball	Clubs	Ribbon	Total	Rank
Jana Berezko-Marggrander	Individual	17.100	16.983	17.100	17.066	68.249	18	Did not advance					

Athlete	Event	Qualification				Final			
Athlete	Event	5 ribbons	3 clubs 2 hoops	Total	Rank	5 ribbons	3 clubs 2 hoops	Total	Rank
Natalie Hermann; Anastasija Khmelnytska; Daniela Potapova; Julia Stavickaja; Sina Tkaltschewitsch	Team	15.650	16.750	32.400	10	Did not advance			

=== Trampoline ===
Germany has qualified one gymnast in the women's trampoline by virtue of a top six finish at the 2016 Olympic Test Event in Rio de Janeiro.

Athlete	Event	Qualification		Final	
Athlete	Event	Score	Rank	Score	Rank
Leonie Adam	Women's	97.885	10	Did not advance	

== Handball ==
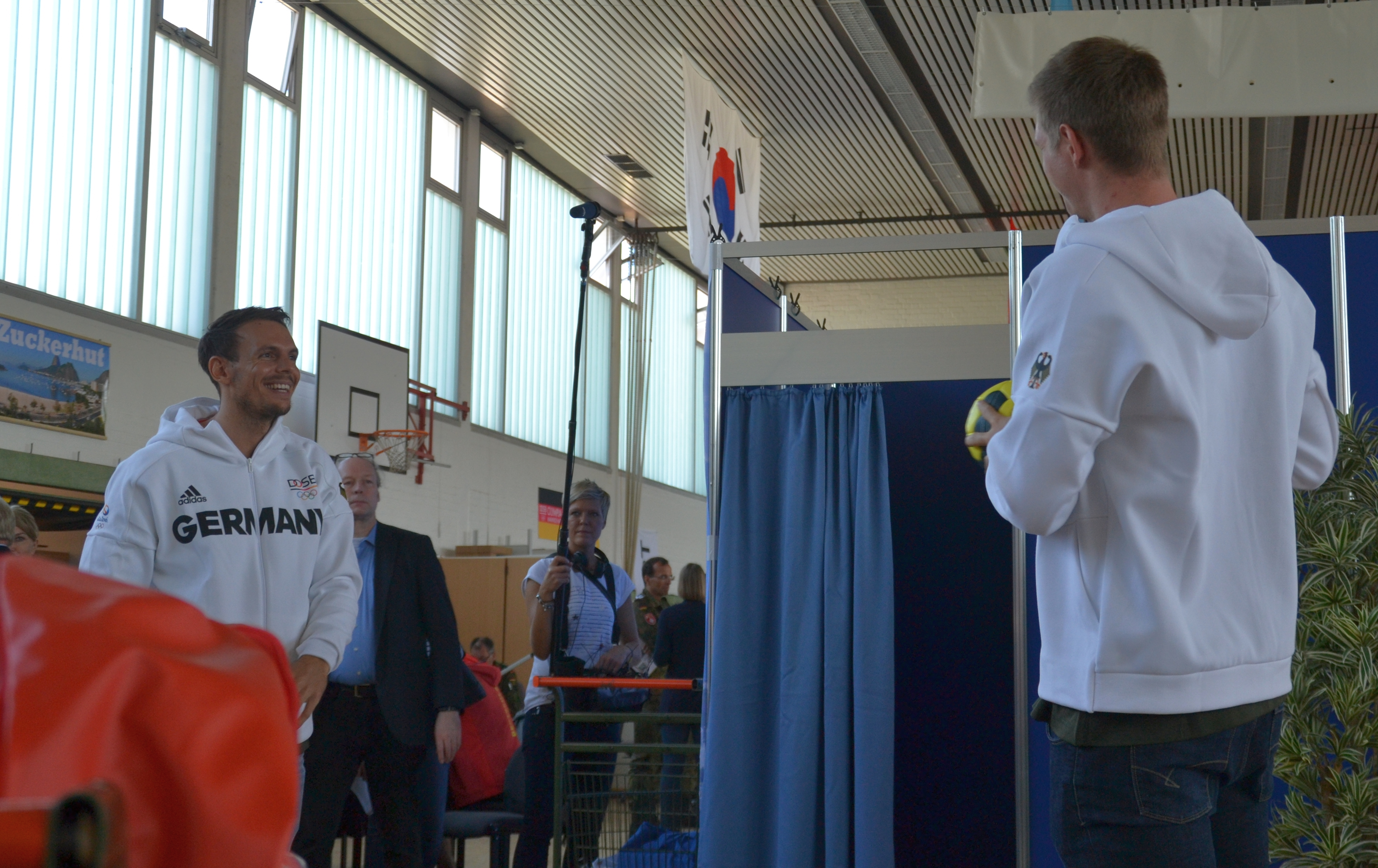
Kai Häfner and Finn Lembke at the Clothing of the German Olympic Team.

Summary

Key:

- ET – After extra time
- P – Match decided by penalty-shootout.

Team	Event	Group stage						Quarterfinal	Semifinal	Final / BM	
Team	Event	Opposition Score	Opposition Score	Opposition Score	Opposition Score	Opposition Score	Rank	Opposition Score	Opposition Score	Opposition Score	Rank
Germany men's	Men's tournament	Sweden; W 32–29	Poland; W 32–29	Brazil; L 30–33	Slovenia; W 28–25	Egypt; W 31–25	1	Qatar; W 34–22	France; L 28–29	Poland; W 31–25	3rd place, bronze medalist(s)

=== Men's tournament ===
The German men's handball team qualified for the Olympics by attaining a top finish and securing a lone outright berth at the 2016 European Men's Handball Championship in Poland.

Team roster

The following is the German roster in the men's handball tournament of the 2016 Summer Olympics. Steffen Weinhold replaced Patrick Groetzki on 10 August 2016.

Head coach: Dagur Sigurðsson

No.	Pos.	Name	Date of birth (age)	Height	App.	Goals	Club
3	LW	Uwe Gensheimer	26 October 1986 (aged 29)	1.88 m	121	528	(France) Paris Saint-Germain
6	LB	Finn Lemke	30 April 1992 (aged 24)	2.10 m	33	19	(Germany) SC Magdeburg
7	P	Patrick Wiencek	22 March 1989 (aged 27)	2.00 m	84	190	(Germany) THW Kiel
9	RW	Tobias Reichmann	27 May 1988 (aged 28)	1.88 m	48	137	(Poland) Vive Targi Kielce
10	RB	Fabian Wiede	8 February 1994 (aged 22)	1.94 m	41	76	(Germany) Füchse Berlin
12	GK	Silvio Heinevetter	21 October 1984 (aged 31)	1.94 m	140	1	(Germany) Füchse Berlin
13	P	Hendrik Pekeler	2 July 1991 (aged 25)	2.03 m	54	76	(Germany) Rhein-Neckar Löwen
17	RB	Steffen Weinhold	19 July 1986 (aged 30)	1.91 m	87	233	(Germany) THW Kiel
19	CB	Martin Strobel	5 June 1986 (aged 30)	1.89 m	127	149	(Germany) HBW Balingen-Weilstetten
24	RW	Patrick Groetzki	4 July 1989 (aged 27)	1.89 m	98	273	(Germany) Rhein-Neckar Löwen
25	RB	Kai Häfner	10 July 1989 (aged 27)	1.92 m	31	62	(Germany) TSV Hannover-Burgdorf
33	GK	Andreas Wolff	3 March 1991 (aged 25)	1.98 m	32	1	(Germany) THW Kiel
35	LB	Julius Kühn	1 April 1993 (aged 23)	1.98 m	13	49	(Germany) VfL Gummersbach
47	LB	Christian Dissinger	15 November 1991 (aged 24)	2.02 m	14	38	(Germany) THW Kiel
95	CB	Paul Drux	7 February 1995 (aged 21)	1.92 m	32	64	(Germany) Füchse Berlin

Group play

Pos	Team	Pld	W	D	L	GF	GA	GD	Pts	Qualification
1	Germany	5	4	0	1	153	141	+12	8 (Note: Slovenia 25–28 Germany)	Quarter-finals
2	Slovenia	5	4	0	1	137	126	+11	8	Quarter-finals
3	Brazil (H)	5	2	1	2	141	150	−9	5	Quarter-finals
4	Poland	5	2	0	3	139	140	−1	4	Quarter-finals
5	Egypt	5	1	1	3	129	143	−14	3	
6	Sweden	5	1	0	4	132	131	+1	2	

Source: IHF
Rules for classification: 1) Points; 2) Head-to-head points; 3) Head-to-head goal difference; 4) Head-to-head goals scored; 5) Goal difference; 6) Goals scored; 7) Draw.
(H) Hosts
Notes:

7 August 2016; 11:30	Sweden	29–32	Germany	Future Arena, Rio de Janeiro; Referees: Hansen, Gjeding (DEN)
7 August 2016; 11:30	Tollbring 8	(15–18)	Kühn 7	Future Arena, Rio de Janeiro; Referees: Hansen, Gjeding (DEN)
7 August 2016; 11:30	4× (yellow card) 9× (suspension) 1× (red card)	Report	3× (yellow card) 9× (suspension)	Future Arena, Rio de Janeiro; Referees: Hansen, Gjeding (DEN)

9 August 2016; 11:30	Germany	32–29	Poland	Future Arena, Rio de Janeiro; Referees: Lopéz, Ramírez (ESP)
9 August 2016; 11:30	three players 5	(16–14)	Bielecki 10	Future Arena, Rio de Janeiro; Referees: Lopéz, Ramírez (ESP)
9 August 2016; 11:30	4× (yellow card) 6× (suspension) 1× (red card)	Report	3× (yellow card) 5× (suspension)	Future Arena, Rio de Janeiro; Referees: Lopéz, Ramírez (ESP)

11 August 2016; 16:40	Brazil	33–30	Germany	Future Arena, Rio de Janeiro; Referees: Horáček, Novotný (CZE)
11 August 2016; 16:40	Chiuffa 8	(17–16)	Häfner, Reichmann 6	Future Arena, Rio de Janeiro; Referees: Horáček, Novotný (CZE)
11 August 2016; 16:40	2× (yellow card) 4× (suspension) 1× (red card)	Report	4× (yellow card) 5× (suspension) 1× (red card)	Future Arena, Rio de Janeiro; Referees: Horáček, Novotný (CZE)

13 August 2016; 09:30	Slovenia	25–28	Germany	Future Arena, Rio de Janeiro; Referees: Nikolov, Nachevski (MKD)
13 August 2016; 09:30	Dolenec 6	(12–11)	Gensheimer 6	Future Arena, Rio de Janeiro; Referees: Nikolov, Nachevski (MKD)
13 August 2016; 09:30	4× (yellow card) 6× (suspension)	Report	4× (yellow card) 8× (suspension)	Future Arena, Rio de Janeiro; Referees: Nikolov, Nachevski (MKD)

15 August 2016; 11:30	Germany	31–25	Egypt	Future Arena, Rio de Janeiro; Referees: Hansen, Gjeding (DEN)
15 August 2016; 11:30	Gensheimer 7	(15–12)	Sanad 7	Future Arena, Rio de Janeiro; Referees: Hansen, Gjeding (DEN)
15 August 2016; 11:30	2× (yellow card) 9× (suspension)	Report	1× (yellow card) 3× (suspension)	Future Arena, Rio de Janeiro; Referees: Hansen, Gjeding (DEN)

Quarterfinal

17 August 2016; 13:30	Germany	34–22	Qatar	Future Arena, Rio de Janeiro; Referees: Lah, Sok (SLO)
17 August 2016; 13:30	three players 5	(16–12)	Capote 9	Future Arena, Rio de Janeiro; Referees: Lah, Sok (SLO)
17 August 2016; 13:30	3× (yellow card) 5× (suspension)	Report	3× (yellow card) 1× (suspension)	Future Arena, Rio de Janeiro; Referees: Lah, Sok (SLO)

Semifinal

19 August 2016; 15:30	France	29–28	Germany	Future Arena, Rio de Janeiro; Referees: Hansen, Gjeding (DEN)
19 August 2016; 15:30	Narcisse 7	(16–13)	Gensheimer 11	Future Arena, Rio de Janeiro; Referees: Hansen, Gjeding (DEN)
19 August 2016; 15:30	3× (yellow card) 4× (suspension)	Report	3× (yellow card) 5× (suspension)	Future Arena, Rio de Janeiro; Referees: Hansen, Gjeding (DEN)

Bronze medal match

21 August 2016; 10:30	Poland	25–31	Germany	Future Arena, Rio de Janeiro; Referees: Horáček, Novotný (CZE)
21 August 2016; 10:30	Krajewski, Lijewski 5	(13–17)	Reichmann 7	Future Arena, Rio de Janeiro; Referees: Horáček, Novotný (CZE)
21 August 2016; 10:30	1× (yellow card) 5× (suspension)	Report	3× (yellow card) 5× (suspension)	Future Arena, Rio de Janeiro; Referees: Horáček, Novotný (CZE)

== Judo ==
Germany has qualified a full squad of 13 judokas for each of the following weight classes at the Games. Twelve of them (six per gender) were ranked among the top 22 eligible judokas for men and top 14 for women in the IJF World Ranking List of 30 May 2016, while Marc Odenthal earned a continental quota spot from the European region as the highest-ranked German judoka outside of direct qualifying position. The judo team, highlighted by London 2012 Olympians Tobias Englmaier and Miryam Roper, was announced on 6 June 2016.

Men

Athlete	Event	Round of 64	Round of 32	Round of 16	Quarterfinals	Semifinals	Repechage	Final / BM	
Athlete	Event	Opposition Result	Opposition Result	Opposition Result	Opposition Result	Opposition Result	Opposition Result	Opposition Result	Rank
Tobias Englmaier	−60 kg	Bye	Garrigós (ESP); W 001–000	Kitadai (BRA); L 000–001	Did not advance				
Sebastian Seidl	−66 kg	Bye	Basile (ITA); L 000–100	Did not advance					
Igor Wandtke	−73 kg	Bye	Deprez (HAI); W 000–000 S	Muki (ISR); L 000–010	Did not advance				
Sven Maresch	−81 kg	Bye	Toma (UAE); L 000–101	Did not advance					
Marc Odenthal	−90 kg	Bye	Baker (JPN); L 000–100	Did not advance					
Karl-Richard Frey	−100 kg	Bye	Cirjenics (HUN); W 100–000	Soe (MYA); W 100–000	Bloshenko (UKR); L 000–011	Did not advance	Darwish (EGY); W 100–000	Maret (FRA); L 000–100	5
André Breitbarth	+100 kg	—N/a	Krakovetskii (KGZ); L 000–100	Did not advance					

Women

Athlete	Event	Round of 32	Round of 16	Quarterfinals	Semifinals	Repechage	Final / BM	
Athlete	Event	Opposition Result	Opposition Result	Opposition Result	Opposition Result	Opposition Result	Opposition Result	Rank
Mareen Kräh	−52 kg	Skrypnik (BLR); W 011–001	Giuffrida (ITA); L 000–001	Did not advance				
Miryam Roper	−57 kg	R Silva (BRA); L 000–100	Did not advance					
Martyna Trajdos	−63 kg	Bye	M Silva (BRA); L 000–000 S	Did not advance				
Laura Vargas Koch	−70 kg	Bye	Moreira (ANG); W 000–000 S	Graf (AUT); W 100–000	Tachimoto (JPN); L 000–010	Bye	Bernabéu (ESP); W 010–000	3rd place, bronze medalist(s)
Luise Malzahn	−78 kg	Bye	Pogorzelec (POL); W 000–000 S	Aguiar (BRA); L 000–000 S	Did not advance	Powell (GBR); W 100–000	Velenšek (SLO); L 000–100	5
Jasmin Külbs	+78 kg	Chibisova (RUS); L 000–101	Did not advance					

== Modern pentathlon ==
German athletes have qualified for the following spots to compete in modern pentathlon. 2008 Olympic champion Lena Schöneborn secured a selection in the women's event by gaining two of the eight Olympic slots available from the 2015 European Championships, while her teammate Annika Schleu finished among the top ten individuals in the UIPM World Rankings as of 1 June 2016. Patrick Dogue and Christian Zillekens granted their invitations from UIPM to compete in the men's event, as three of the next highest-ranked eligible modern pentathletes, not yet qualified, in the World Rankings.

Athlete	Event	Fencing (épée one touch)				Swimming (200 m freestyle)			Riding (show jumping)			Combined: shooting/running (10 m air pistol)/(3200 m)			Total points	Final rank
Athlete	Event	RR	BR	Rank	MP points	Time	Rank	MP points	Penalties	Rank	MP points	Time	Rank	MP Points	Total points	Final rank
Patrick Dogue	Men's	23–12	2	2	240	2:07.65	31	318	12	12	288	11:23.36	14	617	1463	6
Christian Zillekens	Men's	16–19	0	26	196	2:06.24	28	322	14	14	286	11:27.45	17	613	1417	21
Annika Schleu	Women's	17–18	0	16	202	2:19.34	21	282	7	12	293	12:21.95	3	559	1336	5
Lena Schöneborn	Women's	24–11	0	2	244	2:21.74	29	275	EL	31	0	12:54.21	14	526	1045	32

== Rowing ==
Germany has qualified ten out of fourteen boats for each of the following rowing classes into the Olympic regatta. Majority of rowing crews had confirmed Olympic places for their boats at the 2015 FISA World Championships in Lac d'Aiguebelette, France, while the rowers competing in men's lightweight four were further added to the German roster with their top two finish at the 2016 European & Final Qualification Regatta in Lucerne, Switzerland.

A total of 35 rowers (25 men and 10 women) were officially selected as part of the second batch of nominated German athletes to the Olympic roster on 28 June 2016, with Sydney 2000 bronze medalist Marcel Hacker racing with his partner Stephan Krüger in the men's double sculls at his fifth straight Games.

Men

Athlete	Event	Heats		Repechage		Semifinals		Final	
Athlete	Event	Time	Rank	Time	Rank	Time	Rank	Time	Rank
Marcel Hacker; Stephan Krüger	Double sculls	6:31.85	3 SA/B	Bye		6:18.32	4 FB	6:58.86	8
Moritz Moos; Jason Osborne	Lightweight double sculls	6:40.48	4 R	7:05.36	1 SA/B	6:35.90	6 FB	6:32.30	9
Anton Braun; Maximilian Korge; Max Planer; Felix Wimberger	Four	5:59.74	2 SA/B	Bye		6:35.90	6 FB	6:06.24	12
Tobias Franzmann; Jonathan Koch; Lucas Schäfer; Lars Wichert	Lightweight four	6:14.87	4 R	6:03.29	2 SA/B	6:18.43	6 FB	6:35.83	9
Hans Gruhne; Lauritz Schoof; Karl Schulze; Philipp Wende	Quadruple sculls	5:53.63	3 R	5:51.43	1 FA	—N/a		6:06.81	1st place, gold medalist(s)
Felix Drahotta; Malte Jakschik; Eric Johannesen; Andreas Kuffner; Maximilian Munski; Hannes Ocik; Maximilian Reinelt; Richard Schmidt; Martin Sauer (cox)	Eight	5:38.22	1 FA	Bye		—N/a		5:30.96	2nd place, silver medalist(s)

Women

Athlete	Event	Heats		Repechage		Semifinals		Final	
Athlete	Event	Time	Rank	Time	Rank	Time	Rank	Time	Rank
Kerstin Hartmann; Kathrin Marchand	Pair	7:17.98	3 SA/B	Bye		7:39.79	5 FB	7:18.57	8
Mareike Adams; Marie-Cathérine Arnold	Double sculls	7:13.49	4 R	7:00.54	2 SA/B	6:58.70	5 FB	7:39.82	7
Marie-Louise Dräger; Fini Sturm	Lightweight double sculls	7:11.08	3 R	8:02.28	2 SA/B	7:33.21	6 FB	7:32.73	11
Carina Bär; Julia Lier; Lisa Schmidla; Annekatrin Thiele	Quadruple sculls	6:30.86	1 FA	Bye		—N/a		6:49.39	1st place, gold medalist(s)

Qualification Legend: FA=Final A (medal); FB=Final B (non-medal); FC=Final C (non-medal); FD=Final D (non-medal); FE=Final E (non-medal); FF=Final F (non-medal); SA/B=Semifinals A/B; SC/D=Semifinals C/D; SE/F=Semifinals E/F; QF=Quarterfinals; R=Repechage

== Sailing ==
German sailors have qualified one boat in each of the following classes through the 2014 ISAF Sailing World Championships, the individual fleet Worlds, and European qualifying regattas. Two skiff crews (Heil & Plößel and Jurczok & Lorenz), along with two-time Olympic windsurfer Toni Wilhelm, were among the first German sailors to be selected to the Olympic team, following the completion of Princess Sofia Trophy regatta. The 470 crews (Gerz & Szymanski and Bochmann & Steinherr) had claimed their Olympic spots at the European Championships, while Laser sailor Philipp Buhl rounded out the German selection at the ISAF World Cup meet in Hyères, France.

The sailing crew was officially named as part of the first batch of nominated athletes to the Olympic roster on 31 May 2016.

Men

Athlete	Event	Race													Net points	Final rank
Athlete	Event	1	2	3	4	5	6	7	8	9	10	11	12	M*	Net points	Final rank
Toni Wilhelm	RS:X	8	4	13	10	9	4	1	7	~~19~~	7	8	19	10	100	6
Philipp Buhl	Laser	16	16	8	13	17	13	1	25	~~34~~	17	—N/a		EL	126	14
Ferdinand Gerz; Oliver Szymanski	470	13	18	9	23	14	1	~~24~~	6	4	6	—N/a		EL	94	11
Erik Heil; Thomas Plößel	49er	6	3	1	3	5	13	15	4	5	10	4	~~18~~	16	83	3rd place, bronze medalist(s)

Women

Athlete	Event	Race													Net points	Final rank
Athlete	Event	1	2	3	4	5	6	7	8	9	10	11	12	M*	Net points	Final rank
Annika Bochmann; Marlene Steinherr	470	12	16	17	~~DNF~~	15	3	6	14	DSQ	17	—N/a		EL	121	18
Victoria Jurczok; Anika Lorenz	49erFX	~~21~~	8	8	7	6	7	17	10	7	9	6	9	16	110	9

Mixed

Athlete	Event	Race													Net points	Final rank
Athlete	Event	1	2	3	4	5	6	7	8	9	10	11	12	M*	Net points	Final rank
Paul Kohlhoff; Carolina Werner	Nacra 17	14	10	10	17	8	13	5	10	2	9	14	~~18~~	EL	112	13

M = Medal race; EL = Eliminated – did not advance into the medal race

== Shooting ==
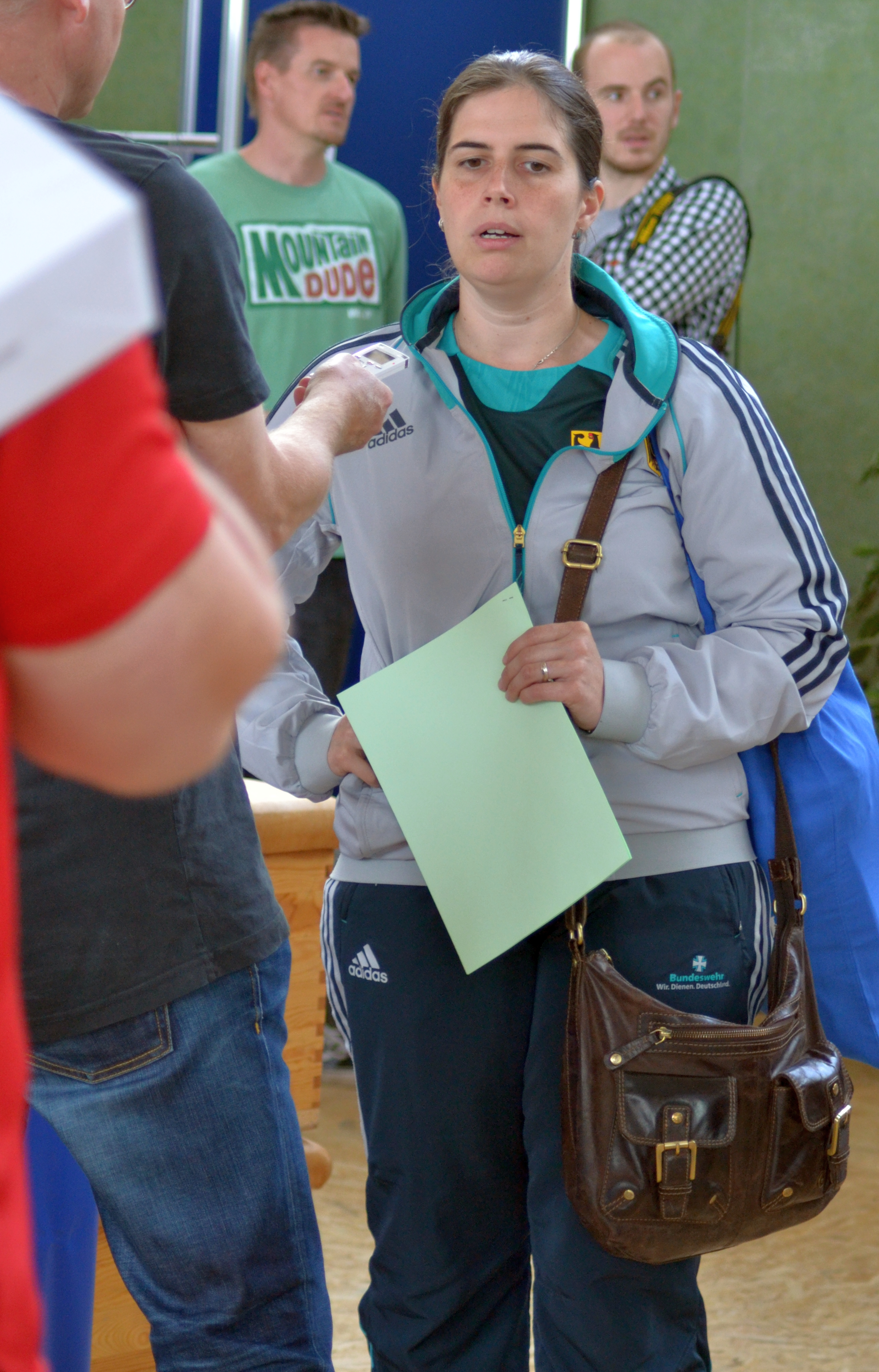
Barbara Engleder giving an interview at the Clothing of the German olympic team.

German shooters have achieved quota places for the following events by virtue of their best finishes at the 2014 and 2015 ISSF World Shooting Championships, the 2015 ISSF World Cup series, and European Championships or Games, as long as they obtained a minimum qualifying standard (MQS) by 31 March 2016. The rifle and pistol shooting team was announced at the Munich leg of the ISSF World Cup series on 24 May 2016, featuring European Games champion Henri Junghänel, three-time Olympian Barbara Engleder, and Beijing 2008 Olympic bronze medalist Christian Reitz. Clay target shooters Andreas Löw and two-time Olympian Christine Wenzel were named to the German shooting roster on 30 May 2016, while London 2012 skeet shooter Ralf Buchheim and trap specialist Jana Beckmann completed the nation's shooting lineup at the Baku leg of the ISSF World Cup on 24 June 2016.

With a double starter (owned by Engleder) securing quota places in two women's rifle events, the German team decided to exchange one of them with the women's 25 m pistol instead based on performances throughout the qualifying period. The slot was awarded to European Games bronze medalist Monika Karsch.

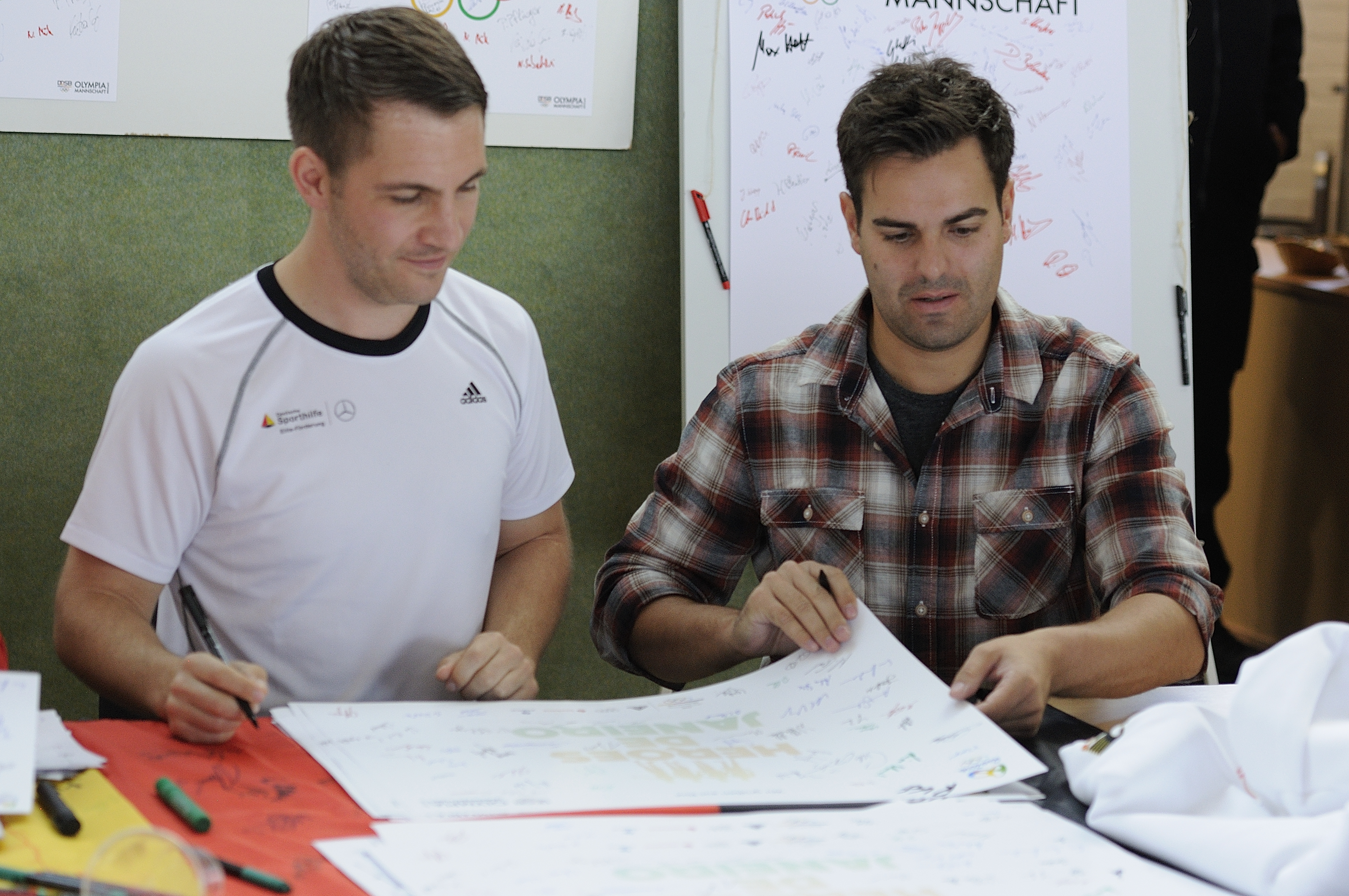
Henri Junghänel and Julian Justus writing autographs at the Clothing of the German olympic team.

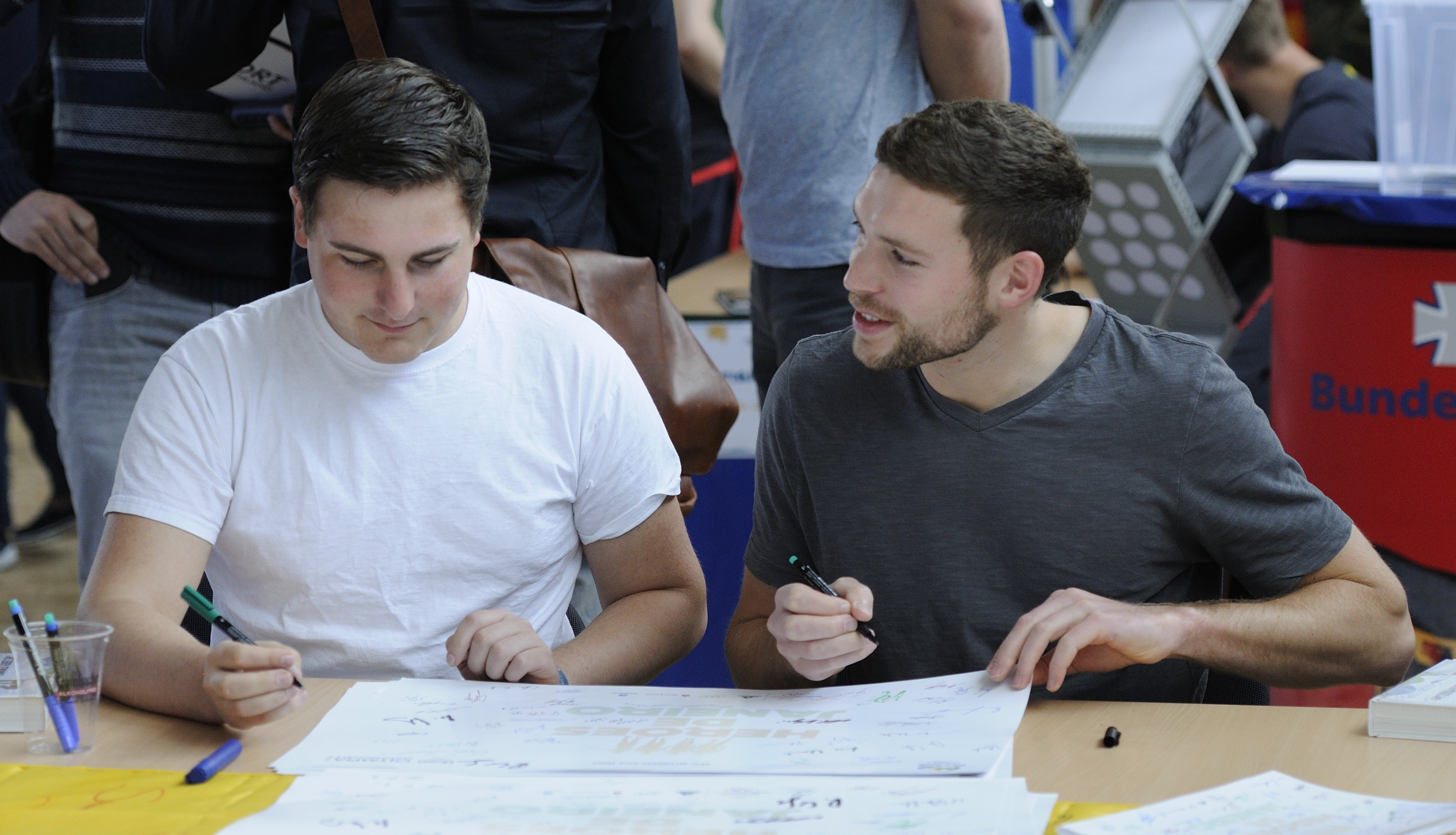
André Link and Michael Janker writing autographs at the Clothing of the German olympic team.

Men

Athlete	Event	Qualification		Semifinal		Final	
Athlete	Event	Points	Rank	Points	Rank	Points	Rank
Daniel Brodmeier	50 m rifle prone	619.2	37	—N/a		Did not advance	
Daniel Brodmeier	50 m rifle 3 positions	1177	2 Q	—N/a		435.6	4
Ralf Buchheim	Skeet	116	23	Did not advance			
Oliver Geis	25 m rapid fire pistol	572	17	—N/a		Did not advance	
Michael Janker	10 m air rifle	620.8	29	—N/a		Did not advance	
Henri Junghänel	50 m rifle prone	627.8	8 Q	—N/a		209.5 OR	1st place, gold medalist(s)
Julian Justus	10 m air rifle	622.8	18	—N/a		Did not advance	
Andre Link	50 m rifle 3 positions	1174	7 Q	—N/a		424.6	5
Andreas Löw	Double trap	140 OR	1 Q	25	6	Did not advance	
Christian Reitz	25 m rapid fire pistol	592	1 Q	—N/a		34	1st place, gold medalist(s)

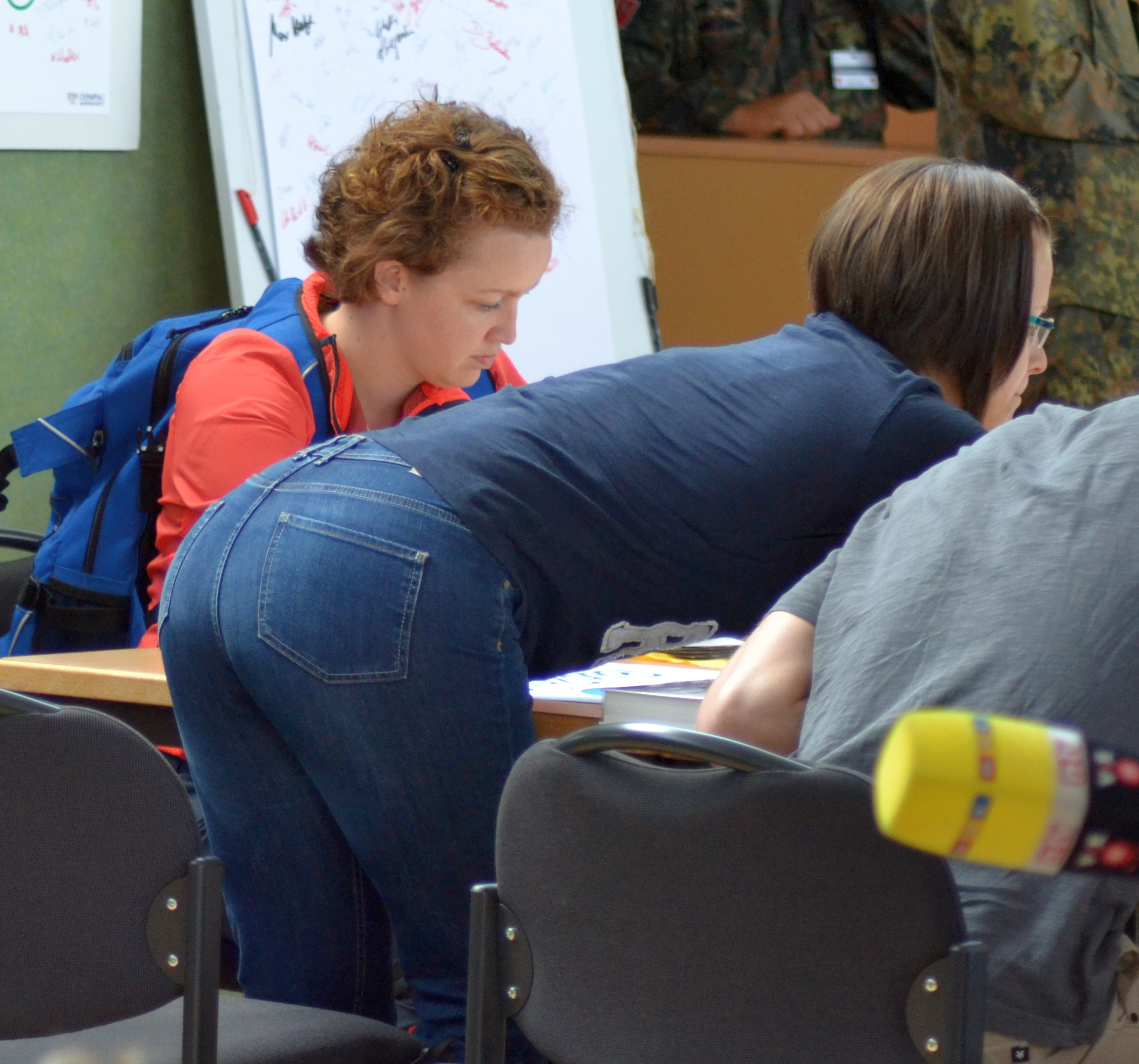
Eva Rösken and Selina Gschwandtner writing autographs at the Clothing of the German olympic team.

Women

Athlete	Event	Qualification		Semifinal		Final	
Athlete	Event	Points	Rank	Points	Rank	Points	Rank
Jana Beckmann	Trap	61	19	Did not advance			
Barbara Engleder	10 m air rifle	420.3	2 Q	—N/a		165.0	4
Barbara Engleder	50 m rifle 3 positions	583	5 Q	—N/a		458.6 OR	1st place, gold medalist(s)
Selina Gschwandtner	10 m air rifle	414.8	13	—N/a		Did not advance	
Monika Karsch	10 m air pistol	379	25	—N/a		Did not advance	
Monika Karsch	25 m pistol	583	4 Q	18	2 Q	6	2nd place, silver medalist(s)
Eva Rösken	50 m rifle 3 positions	579	14	—N/a		Did not advance	
Christine Wenzel	Skeet	68	11	Did not advance			

Qualification Legend: Q = Qualify for the next round; q = Qualify for the bronze medal (shotgun)

== Swimming ==
German swimmers have so far achieved qualifying standards in the following events (up to a maximum of 2 swimmers in each event at the Olympic Qualifying Time (OQT), and potentially 1 at the Olympic Selection Time (OST)): To assure their selection to the Olympic team, swimmers must finish first or second under the federation's standards in their respective events at the German Olympic Trials (5 to 8 May) in Berlin, and then confirm their places at another selection meet: any leg of the Mare Nostrum tour or the German Open (exactly two months after the trials).

The German Swimming Federation (DSV) selected the first batch of swimmers based on their intermediate results at the Olympic Trials and Mare Nostrum Tour, while the remaining batch rounded out the swimming roster for the Olympics through the German Open. All in all, a total of 27 swimmers (16 men and 11 women) were named to the German team for the Games on 12 July 2016, including two-time world record holder Paul Biedermann in middle-distance freestyle, 2015 Worlds champion Marco Koch (200 m breaststroke), and freestyle sprinter Dorothea Brandt, who returned from a 12-year comeback to her second Games.

Men

Athlete	Event	Heat		Semifinal		Final	
Athlete	Event	Time	Rank	Time	Rank	Time	Rank
Paul Biedermann	200 m freestyle	1:45.78	2 Q	1:45.69	=4 Q	1:45.84	6
Steffen Deibler	100 m butterfly	52.14	18	Did not advance			
Christian Diener	200 m backstroke	1:56.62	9 Q	1:56.37	8 Q	1:56.27	7
Christoph Fildebrandt	200 m freestyle	1:47.81	28	Did not advance			
Jan-Philip Glania	100 m backstroke	53.87	15 Q	53.94	12	Did not advance	
Jan-Philip Glania	200 m backstroke	1:56.50	=6 Q	1:56.53	9	Did not advance	
Jacob Heidtmann	400 m individual medley	DSQ		—N/a		Did not advance	
Philip Heintz	200 m individual medley	1:57.59 NR	2 Q	1:58.85	8 Q	1:57.48	6
Johannes Hintze	400 m individual medley	4:18.25	18	—N/a		Did not advance	
Björn Hornikel	100 m freestyle	49.62	39	Did not advance			
Marco Koch	200 m breaststroke	2:08.98	5 Q	2:08.12	7 Q	2:08.00	7
Clemens Rapp	400 m freestyle	3:49.10	24	—N/a		Did not advance	
Christian Reichert	10 km open water	—N/a				1:53:04.7	9
Florian Vogel	400 m freestyle	3:45.49	9	—N/a		Did not advance	
Christian vom Lehn	100 m breaststroke	1:00.13	15 Q	1:00.23	12	Did not advance	
Florian Wellbrock	1500 m freestyle	15:23.88	32	—N/a		Did not advance	
Damian Wierling	50 m freestyle	22.18	19	Did not advance			
Damian Wierling	100 m freestyle	48.35	7 Q	48.66	15	Did not advance	
Steffen Deibler; Björn Hornikel; Damian Wierling; Philip Wolf	4 × 100 m freestyle relay	3:14.97	11	—N/a		Did not advance	
Paul Biedermann; Christoph Fildebrandt; Clemens Rapp; Florian Vogel	4 × 200 m freestyle relay	7:07.66	4 Q	—N/a		7:07.28	6
Steffen Deibler; Jan-Philip Glania; Marco Koch; Christian vom Lehn; Damian Wierling	4 × 100 m medley relay	3:33.67	8 Q	—N/a		3:33.50	7

Women

Athlete	Event	Heat		Semifinal		Final	
Athlete	Event	Time	Rank	Time	Rank	Time	Rank
Leonie Beck	800 m freestyle	8:47.47	25	—N/a		Did not advance	
Dorothea Brandt	50 m freestyle	24.77	=13 Q	24.71	14	Did not advance	
Annika Bruhn	200 m freestyle	1:58.48	20	Did not advance			
Lisa Graf	200 m backstroke	2:08.67	=4 Q	2:09.56	14	Did not advance	
Isabelle Härle	10 km open water	—N/a				1:57:22.1	6
Franziska Hentke	200 m butterfly	2:07.59	9 Q	2:07.67	11	Did not advance	
Franziska Hentke	400 m individual medley	4:43.32	21	—N/a		Did not advance	
Sarah Köhler	400 m freestyle	4:06.55	10	—N/a		Did not advance	
Sarah Köhler	800 m freestyle	8:24.65	7 Q	—N/a		8:27.75	8
Jenny Mensing	200 m backstroke	2:10.68	16 Q	2:10.15	16	Did not advance	
Alexandra Wenk	100 m butterfly	58.49	21	Did not advance			
Alexandra Wenk	200 m individual medley	2:12.46	13 Q	2:12.13	12	Did not advance	
Annika Bruhn; Sarah Köhler; Leonie Kullmann; Paulina Schmiedel	4 × 200 m freestyle relay	7:56.74	12	—N/a		Did not advance	
Annika Bruhn; Lisa Graf; Vanessa Grimberg; Alexandra Wenk	4 × 100 m medley relay	4:02.19	12	—N/a		Did not advance	

== Table tennis ==
Germany has fielded a team of six athletes into the table tennis competition at the Games. Europe's top table tennis player Dimitrij Ovtcharov secured the outright Olympic berth by winning the men's singles title at the 2015 European Games. Meanwhile, four-time Olympian Timo Boll, along with Han Ying and Petrissa Solja, took the remaining spots at the European Qualification Tournament in Halmstad, Sweden.

Bastian Steger and Chinese-born Shan Xiaona were each awarded the third spot to build the men's and women's teams for the Games as the top European nation in the ITTF Olympic Rankings.

Men

Athlete	Event	Preliminary	Round 1	Round 2	Round 3	Round of 16	Quarterfinals	Semifinals	Final / BM	
Athlete	Event	Opposition Result	Opposition Result	Opposition Result	Opposition Result	Opposition Result	Opposition Result	Opposition Result	Opposition Result	Rank
Timo Boll	Singles	Bye			Shibaev (RUS); W 4–3	Aruna (NGR); L 2–4	Did not advance			
Dimitrij Ovtcharov	Singles	Bye			Li P (QAT); W 4–3	Tokič (SLO); W 4–1	Samsonov (BLR); L 2–4	Did not advance		
Timo Boll; Dimitrij Ovtcharov; Bastian Steger	Team	—N/a				Chinese Taipei; W 3–1	Austria; W 3–1	Japan; L 1–3	South Korea; W 3–1	3rd place, bronze medalist(s)

Women

Athlete	Event	Preliminary	Round 1	Round 2	Round 3	Round of 16	Quarterfinals	Semifinals	Final / BM	
Athlete	Event	Opposition Result	Opposition Result	Opposition Result	Opposition Result	Opposition Result	Opposition Result	Opposition Result	Opposition Result	Rank
Han Ying	Singles	Bye			Komwong (THA); W 4–0	Li X (FRA); W 4–1	Ding N (CHN); L 0–4	Did not advance		
Petrissa Solja	Singles	Bye			Ri M-s (PRK); L 0–4	Did not advance				
Han Ying; Shan Xiaona; Petrissa Solja	Team	—N/a				United States; W 3–0	Hong Kong; W 3–1	Japan; W 3–2	China; L 0–3	2nd place, silver medalist(s)

== Taekwondo ==
Germany entered three athletes into the taekwondo competition at the Olympics. 2008 Olympian Levent Tuncat and Tahir Güleç qualified automatically for their respective weight classes by finishing in the top 6 WTF Olympic rankings. Rabia Gülec secured a third spot on the German team by virtue of her finish in the women's welterweight category (67 kg) at the 2016 European Qualification Tournament in Istanbul, Turkey.

Athlete	Event	Round of 16	Quarterfinals	Semifinals	Repechage	Final / BM	
Athlete	Event	Opposition Result	Opposition Result	Opposition Result	Opposition Result	Opposition Result	Rank
Levent Tuncat	Men's −58 kg	Pie (DOM); L DSQ	Did not advance				
Tahir Güleç	Men's −80 kg	Hernández (DOM); W 4–2	Cisse (CIV); L 1–7	Did not advance	Paziński (POL); L 5–6	Did not advance	7
Rabia Gülec	Women's −67 kg	Baryshnikova (RUS); W 9–8	Tatar (TUR); L 1–5	Did not advance			

== Tennis ==
Germany has entered eight tennis players (three men, five women) into the Olympic tournament. Alexander Zverev (world no. 38) and Philipp Kohlschreiber (world no. 26) qualified directly for the men's singles as two of the top 56 eligible players in the ATP World Rankings, while Angelique Kerber (world no. 4), Andrea Petkovic (world no. 33), Annika Beck (world no. 41), and Laura Siegemund (world no. 42) did so for the women's singles based on their WTA World Rankings as of 6 June 2016. Jamaican-born Dustin Brown and Jan-Lennard Struff had also claimed two of six ITF Olympic men's singles places to join Zverev and Kohlschreiber, as Germany's top-ranked tennis players outside of direct qualifying position.

Having been directly entered to the singles, Siegemund also opted to play with her partner Anna-Lena Grönefeld in the women's doubles.

On 30 July 2016, Zverev announced his withdrawal from the Games due to physical problems.

Men

Athlete	Event	Round of 64	Round of 32	Round of 16	Quarterfinals	Semifinals	Final / BM	
Athlete	Event	Opposition Score	Opposition Score	Opposition Score	Opposition Score	Opposition Score	Opposition Score	Rank
Dustin Brown	Singles	Bellucci (BRA); L 6–4, 4–5^{ret}	Did not advance					
Philipp Kohlschreiber	Singles	Pella (ARG); W 4–6, 6–1, 6–2	Martin (SVK); L WO	Did not advance				
Jan-Lennard Struff	Singles	Donskoy (RUS); L 3–6, 4–6	Did not advance					

Women

Athlete	Event	Round of 64	Round of 32	Round of 16	Quarterfinals	Semifinals	Final / BM	
Athlete	Event	Opposition Score	Opposition Score	Opposition Score	Opposition Score	Opposition Score	Opposition Score	Rank
Annika Beck	Singles	Konjuh (CRO); L 6–2, 1–6, 3–6	Did not advance					
Angelique Kerber	Singles	Duque (COL); W 6–3, 7–5	Bouchard (CAN); W 6–4, 6–2	Stosur (AUS); W 6–0, 7–5	Konta (GBR); W 6–1, 6–2	Keys (USA); W 6–3, 7–5	Puig (PUR); L 4–6, 6–4, 1–6	2nd place, silver medalist(s)
Andrea Petkovic	Singles	Svitolina (UKR); L 6–7, 1–6	Did not advance					
Laura Siegemund	Singles	Pironkova (BUL); W 1–6, 6–4, 6–2	Zhang S (CHN); W 6–2, 6–4	Flipkens (BEL); W 6–4, 6–3	Puig (PUR); L 1–6, 1–6	Did not advance		
Anna-Lena Grönefeld; Laura Siegemund	Doubles	—N/a	Kasatkina / Kuznetsova (RUS); L 1–6, 4–6	Did not advance				
Angelique Kerber; Andrea Petkovic	Doubles	—N/a	Errani / Vinci (ITA); L 2–6, 2–6	Did not advance				

== Triathlon ==
Germany has qualified two triathletes for the women's event at the Olympics. London 2012 Olympian Anne Haug and rookie Laura Lindemann were ranked among the top 40 eligible triathletes based on the ITU Olympic Qualification List as of 15 May 2016.

Athlete	Event	Swim (1.5 km)	Trans 1	Bike (40 km)	Trans 2	Run (10 km)	Total Time	Rank
Anne Haug	Women's	21:11	0:57	1:04:50	0:40	35:18	2:02:56	36
Laura Lindemann	Women's	19:18	0:54	1:04:30	0:43	36:27	2:01:52	28

== Volleyball ==
=== Beach ===
Three German beach volleyball teams (one men's pair and two women's pairs) qualified directly for the Olympics by virtue of their nation's top 15 placement in the FIVB Olympic Rankings as of 13 June 2016. Among the beach volleyball players featured two-time Olympian Laura Ludwig, along with her rookie partner Kira Walkenhorst.

Athlete	Event	Preliminary round	Standing	Round of 16	Quarterfinals	Semifinals	Final / BM	
Athlete	Event	Opposition Score	Standing	Opposition Score	Opposition Score	Opposition Score	Opposition Score	Rank
Markus Böckermann; Lars Flüggen	Men's	Pool B Kantor – Łosiak (POL); L 0 – 2 (11–21, 21–23); Brouwer – Meeuwsen (NED); L 1 – 2 (21–19, 17–21, 16–14); Barsouk – Liamin (RUS); L 0 – 2 (14–21, 17–21)	4	Did not advance				
Karla Borger; Britta Büthe	Women's	Pool E Heidrich – Zumkehr (SUI); L 0 – 2 (12–21, 16–21) van Gestel – van der Vlist (NED); W 2 – 0 (21–19, 21–14); Bansley – Pavan (CAN); L 0 – 2 (19–21, 15–21); Lucky Losers; Agudo – Pérez (VEN); W 2 – 0 (21–13, 21–8)	3 q	Antunes – França (BRA); L 0 – 2 (17–21, 19–21)	Did not advance			
Laura Ludwig; Kira Walkenhorst	Women's	Pool D El-Ghobashy – Meawad (EGY); W 2 – 0 (21–12, 21–15); Broder – Valjas (CAN); W 2 – 0 (21–17, 21–11); Giombini – Menegatti (ITA); W 2 – 1 (21–18, 18–21, 15–9)	1 Q	Forrer – Vergé-Dépré (SUI); W 2 – 0 (21–19, 21–10)	Pavan – Bansley (CAN); W 2 – 0 (21–14, 21–14)	Antunes – França (BRA); W 2 – 0 (21–18, 21–12)	Bednarczuk – Seixas (BRA); W 2 – 0 (21–18, 21–14)	1st place, gold medalist(s)

== Weightlifting ==
German weightlifters have qualified four men's quota places for the Rio Olympics based on their combined team standing by points at the 2014 and 2015 IWF World Championships. A single women's Olympic spot had been added to the German roster by virtue of a top six national finish at the 2016 European Championships. The team must allocate these places to individual athletes by 20 June 2016.

The weightlifting team was named to the Olympic roster on 2 July 2016, with Almir Velagic and Jürgen Spieß remarkably going to their second Olympics.

Athlete	Event	Snatch		Clean & jerk		Total	Rank
Athlete	Event	Result	Rank	Result	Rank	Total	Rank
Nico Müller	Men's −77 kg	151	11	181	10	332	10
Jürgen Spieß	Men's −105 kg	170	14	220	5	390	10
Alexej Prochorow	Men's +105 kg	180	17	215	16	395	16
Almir Velagic	Men's +105 kg	188	11	232	10	410	9
Sabine Kusterer	Women's −58 kg	90	9	110	11	200	10

== Wrestling ==
Germany has qualified a total of seven wrestlers for each of the following weight classes into the Olympic competition. Two of them finished among the top six to book Olympic spot each in the men's Greco-Roman 66 kg and women's freestyle 69 kg at the 2015 World Championships, while two more Olympix berths were awarded to German wrestlers, who progressed to the top two finals at the 2016 European Qualification Tournament.

Three further wrestlers had claimed the remaining Olympic slots to round out the German roster in separate World Qualification Tournaments; two of them at the initial meet in Ulaanbaatar and two more at the final meet in Istanbul.

Key:

- VT – Victory by Fall.
- PP – Decision by Points – the loser with technical points.
- PO – Decision by Points – the loser without technical points.
- ST – Technical superiority – the loser without technical points and a margin of victory of at least 8 (Greco-Roman) or 10 (freestyle) points.

Men's Greco-Roman

Athlete	Event	Qualification	Round of 16	Quarterfinal	Semifinal	Repechage 1	Repechage 2	Final / BM	
Athlete	Event	Opposition Result	Opposition Result	Opposition Result	Opposition Result	Opposition Result	Opposition Result	Opposition Result	Rank
Frank Stäbler	−66 kg	Bye	Venckaitis (LTU); W 3–1 ^{PP}	Štefanek (SRB); L 1–3 ^{PP}	Did not advance	Bye	Inoue (JPN); L 1–3 ^{PP}	Did not advance	7
Denis Kudla	−85 kg	Kenjeev (KGZ); W 3–0 ^{PO}	Kobliashvili (GEO); W 3–1 ^{PP}	Chakvetadze (RUS); L 0–4 ^{ST}	Did not advance	Bye	Akhlaghi (IRI); W 3–1 ^{PP}	Lőrincz (HUN); W 3–1 ^{PP}	3rd place, bronze medalist(s)
Eduard Popp	−130 kg	Bye	Tinaliyev (KAZ); W 3–0 ^{PO}	Babajanzadeh (IRI); W 3–1 ^{PP}	Kayaalp (TUR); L 0–4 ^{ST}	Bye		Shariati (AZE); L 0–5 ^{VT}	5

Women's freestyle

Athlete	Event	Qualification	Round of 16	Quarterfinal	Semifinal	Repechage 1	Repechage 2	Final / BM	
Athlete	Event	Opposition Result	Opposition Result	Opposition Result	Opposition Result	Opposition Result	Opposition Result	Opposition Result	Rank
Nina Hemmer	−53 kg	Zhong Xc (CHN); L 1–3 ^{PP}	Did not advance						14
Luisa Niemesch	−58 kg	Koblova (RUS); L 1–3 ^{PP}	Did not advance			Pürevdorj (MGL); L 0–5 ^{VT}	Did not advance		20
Aline Focken	−69 kg	Bye	Zhou F (CHN); W 3–1 ^{PP}	Fransson (SWE); L 1-3 ^{PP}	Did not advance				9
Maria Selmaier	−75 kg	Bye	Wiebe (CAN); L 0–3 ^{PO}	Did not advance		Bye	Zhang Fl (CHN); L 0–4 ^{ST}	Did not advance	18

== See also ==
- Germany at the 2016 Summer Paralympics
