= Björn Hornikel =

German swimmer

Personal information
- Nationality: German
- Born: 6 May 1992 (age 34) Böblingen, Germany
- Height: 193 cm (6 ft 4 in)
- Weight: 91 kg (201 lb)

Sport
- Sport: Swimming
- College team: The University of Alabama

Björn Hornikel (born 6 May 1992) is a German swimmer. He competed in the 100 meter freestyle and 4x100 freestyle relay event at the 2016 Summer Olympics.

In seasonal competition he achieved a 48.65s 100m freestyle result at the 128. Deutschen Meisterschaften in Berlin, qualifying to compete at the 2016 Rio de Janeiro Olympics in Brazil. In Rio, he swam a 49.62s 100m freestyle in his heat, and did not advance to the semi-finals.
