= Nicolas Jacobi =

German field hockey player

Personal information
- Born: 13 April 1987 (age 39) Mainz, West Germany
- Height: 1.93 m (6 ft 4 in)
- Weight: 95 kg (209 lb)

Sport
- Sport: Field hockey
- Position: Goalkeeper
Senior career
Years	Team	Caps	Goals
–	Rüsselsheimer Ruder-Klub	-	-
–	Uhlenhorster HC	-	-
2013–	Delhi Waveriders	13	0
National team
Years	Team	Caps	Goals
2008–	Germany		-
Medal record
Men's field hockey
Representing Germany
Olympic Games
Bronze medal – third place	2016 Rio de Janeiro	Team
Champions Trophy
Gold medal – first place	2014 Bhubaneswar	Team

Nicolas Jacobi (born 13 April 1987) is a German professional field hockey player who currently plays as a goalkeeper for Delhi Waveriders in the Hockey India League and the Germany national field hockey team.

== Career ==
=== Delhi Waveriders ===
On 16 December 2012, Jacobi was bought by the Delhi Waveriders for the new franchise base league, Hockey India League, for $50,000. He then made his debut for the side on 14 January 2013 in the leagues very first match against the Punjab Warriors. He started the match and played the full game as Delhi Waveriders won 2–1.

== International ==
=== 2012 Olympics ===
Jacobi was a reserve for the Germany side that won the gold medal at the 2012 Olympics.
