= Rugby sevens at the 2016 Summer Olympics – Men's team squads =

This article shows the rosters of all participating teams at the men's rugby sevens tournament at the 2016 Summer Olympics in Rio de Janeiro.

== Pool A ==
=== Argentina ===
The following is the Argentina roster in the men's rugby sevens tournament of the 2016 Summer Olympics. On 9 August, Bruzzone replaced Etchart and Rojas by injury.

Head coach: Santiago Gómez Cora

No.	Pos.	Player	Date of birth (age)	Events	Points	Union
1	FW	Fernando Luna	12 May 1990 (aged 26)	28	178	(Argentina) Córdoba Athletic
2	FW	Santiago Álvarez	17 February 1994 (aged 22)	22	100	(Argentina) CASI
3	FW	Germán Schulz	5 February 1994 (aged 22)	18	120	(Argentina) Tala
4	FW	Juan Pablo Estelles	5 May 1988 (aged 28)	3	60	(Argentina) Atlético del Rosario
5	FW	Axel Müller	25 November 1993 (aged 22)	21	212	(Argentina) Marista
6	BK	Matías Moroni	29 March 1991 (aged 25)	13	139	(Argentina) CUBA
7	BK	Javier Rojas	15 April 1991 (aged 25)	10	243	(Argentina) Universitario
8	BK	Gastón Revol (c)	26 November 1986 (aged 29)	49	566	(Argentina) La Tablada
9	BK	Rodrigo Etchart	24 January 1994 (aged 22)	19	175	(Argentina) SIC
10	BK	Bautista Ezcurra	16 January 1995 (aged 21)	10	107	(Argentina) Hindú
11	BK	Juan Imhoff	11 May 1988 (aged 28)	2	5	(France) Racing 92
12	BK	Franco Sábato	13 January 1990 (aged 26)	25	205	(Argentina) Alumni
13	BK	Nicolás Bruzzone	24 October 1985 (aged 30)	54	292	(Argentina) Universitario

=== Brazil ===
The following is the Brazil roster in the men's rugby sevens tournament of the 2016 Summer Olympics.

Head coach: Andrés Romagnoli

No.	Pos.	Player	Date of birth (age)	Events	Points	Union
1	BK	Daniel Sancery	27 May 1994 (aged 22)	2	20	(Brazil) São José
2	FW	Martin Schaefer	18 October 1989 (aged 26)	5	5	(Brazil) SPAC
3	FW	Juliano Fiori	27 June 1985 (aged 31)	6	5	(England) Richmond
4	BK	Felipe Silva	28 February 1986 (aged 30)	4	7	(Brazil) SPAC
5	FW	Stefano Giantorno	27 September 1991 (aged 24)	1	5	(Argentina) San Luis
6	BK	Moisés Duque	21 December 1988 (aged 27)	6	55	(Brazil) São José
7	BK	Lucas Duque (c)	15 March 1984 (aged 32)	6	42	(Brazil) São José
8	FW	Felipe Sancery	27 May 1994 (aged 22)	3	0	(Brazil) São José
9	BK	Laurent Bourda-Couhet	12 July 1994 (aged 22)	3	0	(Brazil) Band Saracens
10	FW	Arthur Bergo	7 March 1994 (aged 22)	1	0	(Brazil) SPAC
11	BK	Gustavo Albuquerque	28 June 1991 (aged 25)	6	20	(Brazil) Curitiba
12	BK	André Silva	22 March 1988 (aged 28)	5	20	(Brazil) SPAC

=== Fiji ===
The following is the Fiji roster in the men's rugby sevens tournament of the 2016 Summer Olympics.

Head coach: Ben Ryan

No.	Pos.	Player	Date of birth (age)	Events	Points	Union
1	FW	Apisai Domolailai	16 April 1989 (aged 27)	20	117	(Fiji) Daveta
2	FW	Jasa Veremalua	29 May 1988 (aged 28)	24	255	(Fiji) Red Rock
3	FW	Semi Kunatani	27 October 1990 (aged 25)	19	295	(France) Toulouse
4	FW	Viliame Mata	22 October 1991 (aged 24)	9	55	(Scotland) Edinburgh
5	FW	Leone Nakarawa	2 April 1988 (aged 28)	7	35	(France) Racing 92
6	BK	Kitione Taliga	21 April 1993 (aged 23)	9	183	(Fiji) Wardens
7	BK	Osea Kolinisau (c)	17 November 1985 (aged 30)	52	1,026	(Fiji) Covenant Brothers
8	BK	Josua Tuisova	4 February 1994 (aged 22)	2	30	(France) Toulon
9	BK	Jerry Tuwai	23 March 1989 (aged 27)	18	222	(Fiji) Daveta
10	BK	Samisoni Nasagavesi	25 April 1988 (aged 28)	24	520	(France) Montauban
11	BK	Savenaca Rawaca	20 August 1991 (aged 24)	16	385	(England) Saracens
12	BK	Vatemo Ravouvou	31 July 1990 (aged 26)	12	542	(Fiji) Westfield Dragons
13	FW	Masivesi Dakuwaqa	14 February 1994 (aged 22)	5	55	(Fiji) Westfield Dragons

=== United States ===
The following is the American roster in the men's rugby sevens tournament of the 2016 Summer Olympics.

Head coach: Mike Friday

No.	Pos.	Player	Date of birth (age)	Events	Points	Union
1	BK	Carlin Isles	21 November 1989 (aged 26)	29	390	Unattached
2	FW	Ben Pinkelman	13 June 1994 (aged 22)	7	40	(United States) Denver Barbarians
3	FW	Danny Barrett	23 March 1990 (aged 26)	23	167	Unattached
4	FW	Garrett Bender	2 December 1991 (aged 24)	24	55	Unattached
5	FW	Zack Test	13 October 1989 (aged 26)	62	721	Unattached
6	FW	Andrew Durutalo	25 October 1987 (aged 28)	30	132	(Japan) Sunwolves
7	BK	Folau Niua	27 January 1985 (aged 31)	40	390	Unattached
8	BK	Maka Unufe	28 September 1991 (aged 24)	23	200	Unattached
9	BK	Chris Wyles	12 September 1983 (aged 32)	13	270	(England) Saracens
10	BK	Madison Hughes (c)	26 October 1992 (aged 23)	23	725	Unattached
11	BK	Perry Baker	29 June 1986 (aged 30)	19	380	Unattached
12	FW	Nate Ebner	14 December 1988 (aged 27)	3	10	(United States) New England Patriots

== Pool B ==
=== Australia ===
The following is the Australia roster in the men's rugby sevens tournament of the 2016 Summer Olympics. Tom Kingston replaced injured Lewis Holland after he injured his hamstring on Day 1.

Head coach: Andy Friend

No.	Pos.	Player	Date of birth (age)	Events	Points	Union
1	FW	Nick Malouf	19 March 1993 (aged 23)	22	175	(Australia) University of Queensland
2	FW	Jesse Parahi	29 July 1989 (aged 27)	35	125	(Australia) Northern Suburbs
3	BK	Henry Hutchison	12 February 1997 (aged 19)	7	135	(Australia) Randwick
4	BK	Lewis Holland	14 January 1993 (aged 23)	31	469	(Australia) Queanbeyan Whites
5	BK	James Stannard	21 February 1983 (aged 33)	31	794	(Australia) Souths
6	FW	Con Foley	19 September 1992 (aged 23)	42	309	(Australia) University of Queensland
7	BK	Cameron Clark	20 March 1993 (aged 23)	30	632	(Australia) Northern Suburbs
8	FW	Pat McCutcheon	24 June 1987 (aged 29)	14	100	(Australia) Sydney University
9	FW	Ed Jenkins (c)	26 May 1986 (aged 30)	45	522	(Australia) Sydney University
10	FW	Allan Fa'alava'au	15 December 1993 (aged 22)	28	257	(Australia) Endeavour Hills
11	BK	John Porch	4 March 1994 (aged 22)	5	62	(Australia) Northern Suburbs
12	FW	Tom Cusack	1 March 1993 (aged 23)	15	60	(Australia) Canberra Royals
13	BK	Tom Kingston	19 June 1991 (aged 25)	9	45	(Australia) Sydney Stars

=== France ===
The following is the France roster in the men's rugby sevens tournament of the 2016 Summer Olympics.

Head coach: Frédéric Pomarel

No.	Pos.	Player	Date of birth (age)	Events	Points	Union
1	FW	Jonathan Laugel	30 January 1993 (aged 23)	40	95	Unattached
2	FW	Manoël Dall'igna	12 March 1985 (aged 31)	50	255	Unattached
3	FW	Damien Cler	2 October 1983 (aged 32)	10	65	Unattached
4	BK	Terry Bouhraoua (c)	26 August 1987 (aged 28)	37	915	Unattached
5	BK	Stephen Parez	1 August 1994 (aged 22)	24	273	Unattached
6	BK	Steeve Barry	18 April 1991 (aged 25)	39	274	(France) Stade Rochelais
7	BK	Virimi Vakatawa	1 May 1992 (aged 24)	16	300	Unattached
8	FW	Pierre-Gilles Lakafia	12 March 1987 (aged 29)	21	115	Unattached
9	BK	Jérémy Aicardi	26 November 1988 (aged 27)	16	114	Unattached
10	BK	Julien Candelon	8 July 1980 (aged 36)	35	546	Unattached
11	FW	Sacha Valleau	8 October 1996 (aged 19)	10	42	Unattached
12	BK	Vincent Inigo	10 February 1983 (aged 33)	29	109	Unattached

=== South Africa ===
The following is the South Africa roster in the men's rugby sevens tournament of the 2016 Summer Olympics.

Head coach: Neil Powell

No.	Pos.	Player	Date of birth (age)	Events	Points	Union
1	BK	Dylan Sage	24 January 1992 (aged 24)	7	40	(South Africa) SARU
2	FW	Philip Snyman	26 April 1987 (aged 29)	37	211	(South Africa) SARU
3	FW	Tim Agaba	23 July 1989 (aged 27)	7	25	(South Africa) SARU
4	FW	Kwagga Smith	11 June 1993 (aged 23)	24	250	(South Africa) SARU
5	FW	Werner Kok	17 January 1993 (aged 23)	19	210	(South Africa) SARU
6	FW	Kyle Brown (c)	6 February 1987 (aged 29)	56	385	(South Africa) SARU
7	BK	Cheslin Kolbe	28 October 1993 (aged 22)	12	192	(South Africa) Stormers
8	BK	Rosko Specman	28 April 1989 (aged 27)	13	169	(South Africa) SARU
9	BK	Justin Geduld	1 October 1993 (aged 22)	25	558	(South Africa) SARU
10	BK	Cecil Afrika	3 March 1988 (aged 28)	45	1,123	(South Africa) SARU
11	BK	Seabelo Senatla	10 March 1993 (aged 23)	29	785	(South Africa) Stormers
12	BK	Juan de Jongh	15 April 1988 (aged 28)	6	40	(South Africa) Stormers
13	BK	Francois Hougaard	6 April 1988 (aged 28)	6	25	(England) Worcester Warriors

=== Spain ===
The following is Spain's roster in the men's rugby sevens tournament of the 2016 Summer Olympics.

Head coach: José Ignacio Incháusti

No.	Pos.	Player	Date of birth (age*)	Events	Points	Union
1	FW	Ignacio Martín	15 October 1983 (aged 32)	11	129	(Spain) Bera Bera
2	FW	Matías Tudela (c)	6 October 1984 (aged 31)	16	45	(Spain) Tatami
3	FW	Iñaki Villanueva	10 February 1991 (aged 25)	2	5	(Spain) Complutense Cisneros
4	BK	Pablo Feijoo	18 May 1982 (aged 34)	12	69	(Spain) Complutense Cisneros
5	BK	Ángel López	16 January 1992 (aged 24)	13	39	(Spain) Complutense Cisneros
6	FW	Francisco Hernández	28 October 1988 (aged 27)	9	82	(Spain) Complutense Cisneros
7	BK	Marcos Poggi	8 March 1985 (aged 31)	8	40	(Spain) Complutense Cisneros
8	BK	César Sempere	26 April 1984 (aged 32)	4	112	(Spain) Tatami
9	BK	Igor Genua	5 June 1988 (aged 28)	5	34	(Spain) Hernani
10	BK	Joan Losada	20 June 1992 (aged 24)	1	5	(Spain) FC Barcelona
11	BK	Pol Pla	18 February 1993 (aged 23)	0	0	(Spain) FC Barcelona
12	BK	Javier Carrión	9 November 1990 (aged 25)	16	67	(Spain) La Vila
*Ages given as in 2016.

== Pool C ==
=== Great Britain ===
The following is the Great Britain roster in the men's rugby sevens tournament of the 2016 Summer Olympics.

Head coach: Simon Amor

No.	Pos.	Player	Country	Date of birth (age)	Events	Points	Union
1	FW	Mark Robertson	Scotland	30 December 1984 (aged 31)	47	426	Unattached
2	BK	Ruaridh McConnochie	England	23 October 1991 (aged 24)	9	45	Unattached
3	FW	Phil Burgess	England	1 July 1988 (aged 28)	22	212	Unattached
4	BK	Dan Norton	England	22 March 1988 (aged 28)	57	1,064	Unattached
5	FW	James Rodwell	England	23 August 1984 (aged 31)	69	445	Unattached
6	BK	Tom Mitchell (c)	England	22 July 1989 (aged 27)	34	897	(England) Harlequins
7	BK	Dan Bibby	England	6 February 1991 (aged 25)	25	321	Unattached
8	FW	James Davies	Wales	25 October 1990 (aged 25)	14	180	(Wales) Scarlets
9	BK	Ollie Lindsay-Hague	England	8 October 1990 (aged 25)	15	110	(England) Harlequins
10	FW	Sam Cross	Wales	26 August 1992 (aged 23)	27	170	(Wales) Newport
11	BK	Marcus Watson	England	27 June 1991 (aged 25)	32	424	(England) Newcastle Falcons
12	BK	Mark Bennett	Scotland	3 February 1993 (aged 23)	2	35	(Scotland) Glasgow Warriors

=== Japan ===
The following is the Japan roster in the men's rugby sevens tournament of the 2016 Summer Olympics.

Head coach: Tomohiro Segawa

No.	Pos.	Player	Date of birth (age)	Events	Points	Union
1	BK	Lomano Lemeki	20 January 1989 (aged 27)	14	221	(Japan) Honda Heat
2	FW	Lote Tuqiri	12 November 1987 (aged 28)	20	125	(Japan) Kubota Spears
3	FW	Yoshitaka Tokunaga	10 April 1992 (aged 24)	3	5	(Japan) Toshiba Brave Lupus
4	FW	Yusaku Kuwazuru (c)	23 October 1985 (aged 30)	31	45	(Japan) Coca-Cola Red Sparks
5	FW	Kameli Soejima	1 June 1983 (aged 33)	8	92	(Japan) Genkai Tangaroa
6	FW	Masakatsu Hikosaka	18 January 1991 (aged 25)	12	35	(Japan) Toyota Verblitz
7	BK	Katsuyuki Sakai	7 September 1988 (aged 27)	23	424	(Japan) Toyota Industries Shuttles
8	BK	Kazushi Hano	21 June 1991 (aged 25)	13	45	(Japan) NTT Communications Shining Arcs
9	BK	Shohei Toyoshima	9 January 1989 (aged 27)	11	105	(Japan) Toshiba Brave Lupus
10	BK	Teruya Goto	18 December 1991 (aged 24)	4	15	(Japan) NEC Green Rockets
11	BK	Kenki Fukuoka	7 September 1992 (aged 23)	2	10	(Japan) Panasonic Wild Knights
12	BK	Kazuhiro Goya	21 April 1993 (aged 23)	12	53	(Japan) Kubota Spears

=== Kenya ===
The following is the Kenya roster in the men's rugby sevens tournament of the 2016 Summer Olympics - age represents each players age when the Olympics took place.

Head coach: Benjamin Ayimba

No.	Pos.	Player	Date of birth (age)	Events	Points	Union
1	BK	Oscar Ayodi	21 September 1989 (aged 26)	26	180	(Kenya) Homeboyz
2	FW	Bush Mwale	14 November 1993 (aged 22)	13	75	(Kenya) Homeboyz
3	FW	Oscar Ouma Achieng	3 May 1989 (aged 27)	32	320	(Kenya) Nakuru
4	BK	Lugonzo Ligamy	29 July 1992 (aged 24)	10	51	(Kenya) Homeboyz
5	BK	Billy Odhiambo	7 November 1993 (aged 22)	27	250	(Kenya) Strathmore University
6	FW	Humphrey Kayange	20 July 1982 (aged 34)	67	799	(Kenya) Mwamba
7	BK	Biko Adema	1 September 1987 (aged 28)	53	702	(Kenya) Nondescripts
8	FW	Andrew Amonde (c)	25 December 1983 (aged 32)	48	170	Kenya Commercial Bank
9	FW	Dennis Ombachi	14 December 1991 (aged 24)	22	130	(Kenya) Mwamba
10	BK	Samuel Oliech	15 December 1993 (aged 22)	6	99	(Kenya) Impala Saracens
11	BK	Collins Injera	18 October 1986 (aged 29)	66	1,211	(Kenya) Mwamba
12	FW	Willy Ambaka	14 May 1990 (aged 26)	29	325	Kenya Harlequin

=== New Zealand ===
The following is the New Zealand roster in the men's rugby sevens tournament of the 2016 Summer Olympics.

Head coach: Gordon Tietjens

No.	Pos.	Player	Date of birth (age)	Events	Points	Union
1	FW	Scott Curry (c)	17 May 1988 (aged 28)	31	360	(New Zealand) Bay of Plenty
2	BK	Tim Mikkelson	13 August 1986 (aged 29)	62	882	(New Zealand) Waikato
3	FW	Akira Ioane	16 June 1995 (aged 21)	9	77	(New Zealand) Blues
4	FW	DJ Forbes	15 December 1982 (aged 33)	79	687	(New Zealand) Counties Manukau
5	BK	Lewis Ormond	5 February 1994 (aged 22)	8	82	(New Zealand) Taranaki
6	BK	Augustine Pulu	4 January 1990 (aged 26)	6	45	(New Zealand) Blues
7	FW	Sam Dickson	28 October 1989 (aged 26)	29	232	(New Zealand) Canterbury
8	BK	Gillies Kaka	28 May 1990 (aged 26)	30	721	(New Zealand) Hawke's Bay
9	BK	Regan Ware	7 August 1994 (aged 21)	9	85	(New Zealand) Bay of Plenty
10	BK	Rieko Ioane	18 March 1997 (aged 19)	10	265	(New Zealand) Blues
11	BK	Joe Webber	27 August 1993 (aged 22)	23	357	(New Zealand) Bay of Plenty
12	BK	Sonny Bill Williams	3 August 1985 (aged 31)	6	20	(New Zealand) Blues
13	BK	Sione Molia	5 September 1993 (aged 22)	6	35	(New Zealand) Counties Manukau

== See also ==
- Rugby sevens at the 2016 Summer Olympics – Women's team squads
