= Rugby sevens at the 2016 Summer Olympics – Men's tournament =

2016 Men's Olympic Rugby Sevens Tournament
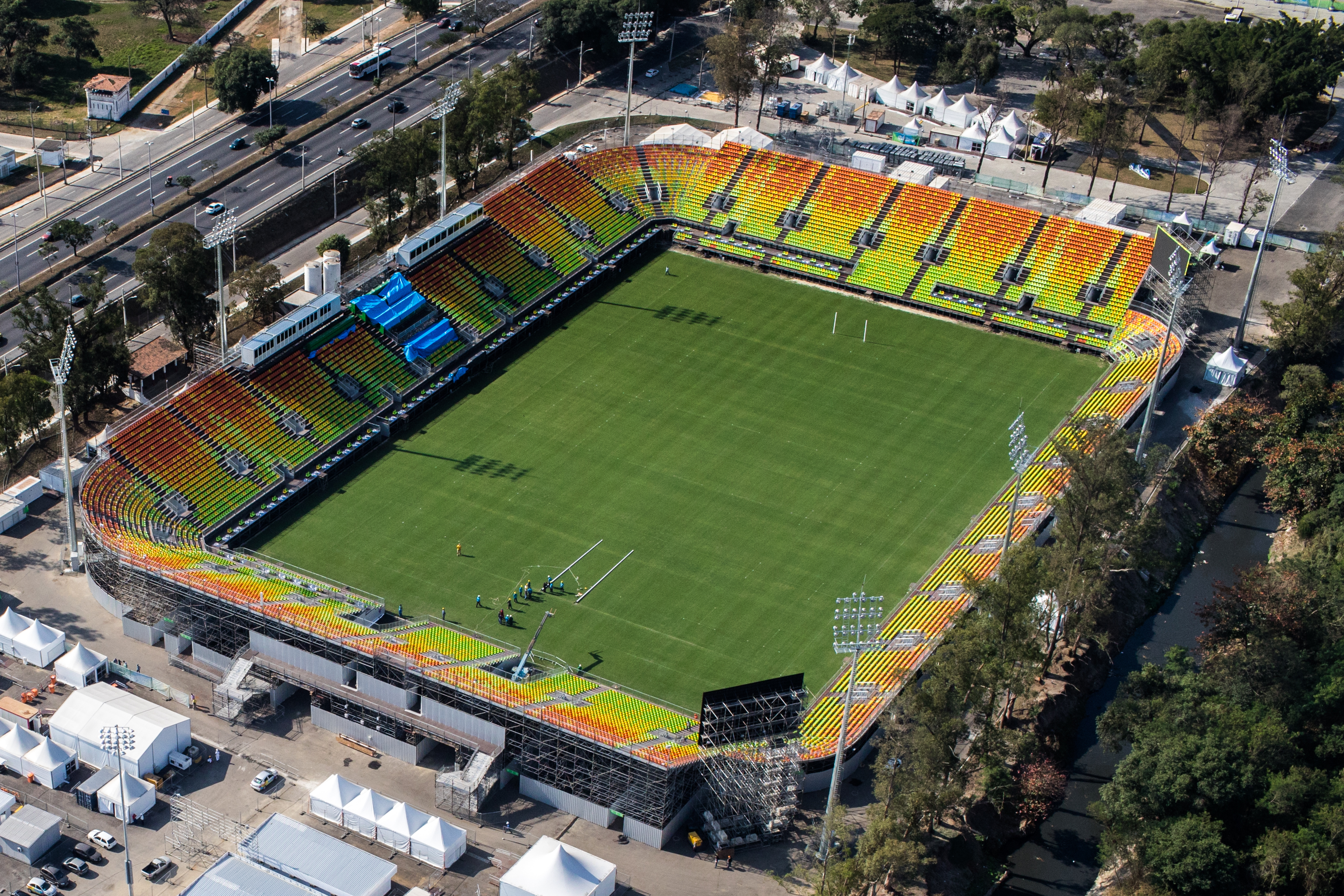
- Aerial view of the Deodoro Stadium, where the Men's Rugby Sevens tournament was played

Tournament details
- Host: Brazil
- Venue: Deodoro Stadium
- Date: 9–11 August 2016
- Teams: 12

Final positions
- Champions: Fiji (1st title)
- Runner-up: Great Britain
- Third place: South Africa
- Fourth place: Japan

Tournament statistics
- Matches played: 34
- Tries scored: 175 (5.15 per match)
- Top scorer(s): (South Africa) Cecil Afrika (47 points)
- Most tries: (United States) Carlin Isles (6 tries)

The men's rugby sevens tournament at the 2016 Summer Olympics was held in Brazil. It was hosted at the Deodoro Stadium, a temporary outdoor stadium constructed as part of the Deodoro Modern Pentathlon Park in Rio de Janeiro. The tournament was held from 9 August to 11 August 2016, starting with group matches before finishing with the medal ceremony on 11 August. The 2016 Games marked the first time that rugby sevens has been played at the Olympics, and the first time since 1924 that any form of rugby had been played at the Olympics.

The gold medal for Fiji represented the first Olympic medal earned by Fiji at any Olympics. Great Britain won silver and South Africa defeated Japan to win the bronze medal.

== Qualification ==
With Brazil being the hosts, their team automatically qualified despite their sevens team not regularly appearing in the World Rugby Sevens Series. The 2014–15 Sevens World Series was the initial stage of qualification, with the top 4 teams at the end of the series gaining qualification to the 2016 Olympic Games. Between June and September 2015, each of the six regional rugby unions held an Olympic qualification event, where one team from each region qualified, bringing the total up to 11 teams qualified. The final spot was determined by a repechage tournament held in Monaco, where the winner of that event became the final team to qualify for the 2016 Olympic Games.

As a result of England finishing fourth in the 2014–15 Sevens World Series, Great Britain were awarded a spot in the Olympic Games, despite the other nations failing to qualify in the top 4. This is because Great Britain compete as one union in the Olympics and as several in international rugby (Rugby Football Union for England, Welsh Rugby Union, Scottish Rugby Union and the combined Irish Rugby Football Union for Northern Ireland and the Republic of Ireland), which meant should one of either the England, Wales or Scotland teams qualify, then Great Britain would be awarded a spot in the Olympic Games. It was decided players based in Northern Ireland were not eligible to represent Great Britain in the rugby sevens tournament as these players represent the IRFU, and the union demanded that Northern Irish players that have committed to play for the Irish rugby union, only play for Ireland despite being eligible under IOC rules to compete for Great Britain. The three remaining unions agreed in advance of the 2013–14 Sevens World Series that their highest-finishing teams in that season would represent all three unions in the first stage of qualification.

=== Qualified teams ===
| Nation | Means of qualification |
|---|---|
| Brazil | Host nation |
| Fiji | 2014–15 Sevens World Series top 4 finishers |
| Great Britain | 2014–15 Sevens World Series top 4 finishers |
| New Zealand | 2014–15 Sevens World Series top 4 finishers |
| South Africa | 2014–15 Sevens World Series top 4 finishers |
| Argentina | 2015 CONSUR Sevens Champions |
| United States | 2015 NACRA Sevens Champions |
| France | 2015 Rugby Europe Sevens Champions |
| Japan | 2015 ARFU Sevens Champions |
| Australia | 2015 Oceania Sevens Champions |
| Kenya | 2015 Africa Cup Sevens Champions |
| Spain | 2016 Final Olympic Qualification Champions |

== Draw ==
The draw for the tournament took place on 28 June 2016. The 12 teams were seeded based on their points they have accumulated over the past two seasons on the Sevens Series circuit. The four teams that qualified directly from the 2014–15 Sevens World Series were guaranteed a top four seeding, with their positioning determined by their combined score over the two seasons.

| Seed 1 | Seed 2 | Seed 3 |
|---|---|---|
| Fiji (1); South Africa (2); New Zealand (3); Great Britain (4) | Australia (5); United States (6); Argentina (7); France (8) | Kenya (9); Japan (10); Spain (11); Brazil (12) |

== Competition schedule ==
The men's rugby tournament takes place over three days:

| Date | Event |
|---|---|
| August 9 | 12 group play matches |
| August 10 | 6 group play matches Quarterfinals |
| August 11 | Semifinals; Final and bronze matches Medal ceremony |

== Match officials ==
World Rugby announced a panel of twelve match officials on 11 April 2016 for the men's sevens. Two Brazilians were later added as assistant referees.

- Mike Adamson (Great Britain)
- Federico Anselmi (Argentina)
- Nick Briant (New Zealand)
- Ben Crouse (South Africa)
- Craig Joubert (South Africa)
- Richard Kelly (New Zealand)
- Anthony Moyes (Australia)
- Matthew O'Brien (Australia)
- Taku Otsuki (Japan)
- Rasta Rasivhenge (South Africa)
- Alexandre Ruiz (France)
- Marius van der Westhuizen (South Africa)
- Henrique Platais (Brazil) – Assistant referee
- Ricardo Sant'Anna (Brazil) – Assistant referee

== Pool stage ==
In pool play, each team plays one match against the other three teams in the group. Three points are awarded for a win, two points - for a draw, and one point - for a loss.

Group winners and runners-up advance to the quarter-finals. Third place teams drop to a third-placed teams table, where the top two third placed teams advance to the quarter-finals. Rankings are based on competition points; if teams are tied, the next tiebreaker is points difference.

=== Pool A ===
| Pos | Team | Pld | W | D | L | PF | PA | PD | Pts | Qualification |
|---|---|---|---|---|---|---|---|---|---|---|
| 1 | Fiji | 3 | 3 | 0 | 0 | 85 | 45 | +40 | 9 | Quarter-finals |
| 2 | Argentina | 3 | 2 | 0 | 1 | 62 | 35 | +27 | 7 | Quarter-finals |
| 3 | United States | 3 | 1 | 0 | 2 | 59 | 41 | +18 | 5 | |
| 4 | Brazil | 3 | 0 | 0 | 3 | 12 | 97 | −85 | 3 | |

Source: World Rugby
Rules for classification: 1) Points; 2) Head-to-head result; 3) Point difference; 4) Points scored.

9 August 2016
13:00

| United States | 14–17 | Argentina |
| Try: Penalty try 11' c Barrett 12' c Con: Hughes (2/2) | Report (Rio 2016); Report (World Rugby) | Try: Müller 4' c Luna 8' m Moroni 14' m Con: Revol (1/3) |

Deodoro Stadium, Rio de Janeiro
Referee: Craig Joubert (South Africa)

9 August 2016
13:30

| Fiji | 40–12 | Brazil |
| Try: Veremalua (2) 6' c, 12' c Kolinisau 8' c Tuisova (2) 9' m, 13' c Viriviri 10' c Con: Kolinisau (2/2); Ravouvou (3/4) | Report (Rio 2016); Report (World Rugby) | Try: Claro 4' m Albuquerque 14' c Con: Duque (0/1); A. Silva (1/1) |

Deodoro Stadium, Rio de Janeiro
Referee: Federico Anselmi (Argentina)

9 August 2016
18:00

| United States | 26–0 | Brazil |
| Try: Niua 3' c Ebner 7' c Isles 13' m Unufe 14' c Con: Hughes (3/4) | Report |

Deodoro Stadium, Rio de Janeiro
Referee: Matthew O'Brien (Australia)

9 August 2016
18:30

| Fiji | 21–14 | Argentina |
| Try: Tuisova 2' c Taliga (2) 11' c, 12' c Con: Ravouvou (1/1); Kolinisau (2/2) | Report (Rio 2016); Report (World Rugby) | Try: Sábato 5' c Álvarez 8' c Con: Revol (2/2) |

Deodoro Stadium, Rio de Janeiro
Referee: Rasta Rasivhenge (South Africa)

10 August 2016
13:00

| Argentina | 31–0 | Brazil |
| Try: Müller 4' m Revol 6' c Álvarez 7' c Schulz 11' c Bruzzone 13' m Con: Revol (3/5) | Report (Rio 2016); Report (World Rugby) |

Deodoro Stadium, Rio de Janeiro
Referee: Mike Adamson (Great Britain)

10 August 2016
13:30

| Fiji | 24–19 | United States |
| Try: Kolinisau 6' c Ravouvou 7' m Mata 9' c Kunatani 12' m Con: Kolinisau (2/3); Ravouvou (0/1) | Report | Try: Barrett 4' c Baker 8' c Ebner 13' m Con: Hughes (2/3) |

Deodoro Stadium, Rio de Janeiro
Referee: Richard Kelly (New Zealand)

=== Pool B ===
| Pos | Team | Pld | W | D | L | PF | PA | PD | Pts | Qualification |
|---|---|---|---|---|---|---|---|---|---|---|
| 1 | South Africa | 3 | 2 | 0 | 1 | 55 | 12 | +43 | 7 | Quarter-finals |
| 2 | France | 3 | 2 | 0 | 1 | 57 | 45 | +12 | 7 | Quarter-finals |
| 3 | Australia | 3 | 2 | 0 | 1 | 52 | 48 | +4 | 7 | Quarter-finals |
| 4 | Spain | 3 | 0 | 0 | 3 | 17 | 76 | −59 | 3 | |

Source: World Rugby
Rules for classification: 1) Points; 2) Head-to-head result; 3) Point difference; 4) Points scored.

9 August 2016
11:00

| Australia | 14–31 | France |
| Try: Parahi 8' c Jenkins 9' c Con: Stannard (2/2) | Report (Rio 2016); Report (World Rugby) | Try: Bouhraoua (3) 4' c, 6' c, 14' c Dall'igna 13' c Con: Bouhraoua (3/3); Inigo (1/1); Pen: Bouhraoua (1/1) 7' |

Deodoro Stadium, Rio de Janeiro
Referee: Mike Adamson (Great Britain)

9 August 2016
11:30

| South Africa | 24–0 | Spain |
| Try: Afrika (2) 1' c, 7' c Senatla 8' m Snyman 12' m Con: Afrika (2/4) | Report (Rio 2016); Report (World Rugby) |

Deodoro Stadium, Rio de Janeiro
Referee: Nick Briant (New Zealand)

9 August 2016
16:00

| Australia | 26–12 | Spain |
| Try: Clark 1' c Parahi 7' c Porch 8' m Foley 14' c Con: Stannard (3/4) | Report (Rio 2016); Report (World Rugby) | Try: Poggi (2) 2' m, 4' c Con: Hernández (1/2) |

Deodoro Stadium, Rio de Janeiro
Referee: Rasta Rasivhenge (South Africa)

9 August 2016
16:30

| South Africa | 26–0 | France |
| Try: Geduld 1' c Smith 4' c Brown 6' m Sage 12' c Con: Afrika (3/4) | Report (Rio 2016); Report (World Rugby) |

Deodoro Stadium, Rio de Janeiro
Referee: Richard Kelly (New Zealand)

10 August 2016
11:00

| France | 26–5 | Spain |
| Try: Vakatawa (2) 4' c, 8' m Cler 10' c Aicardi 12' c Con: Bouhraoua (3/4) | Report (Rio 2016); Report (World Rugby) | Try: Sempere 14' m Con: Genua (0/1) |

Deodoro Stadium, Rio de Janeiro
Referee: Anthony Moyes (Australia)

10 August 2016
11:30

| South Africa | 5–12 | Australia |
| Try: Senatla 11' m Con: Kolbe (0/1) | Report (Rio 2016); Report (World Rugby) | Try: Parahi 3' c Cusack 6' m Con: Stannard (1/2) |

Deodoro Stadium, Rio de Janeiro
Referee: Alexandre Ruiz (France)

=== Pool C ===
| Pos | Team | Pld | W | D | L | PF | PA | PD | Pts | Qualification |
|---|---|---|---|---|---|---|---|---|---|---|
| 1 | Great Britain | 3 | 3 | 0 | 0 | 73 | 45 | +28 | 9 | Quarter-finals |
| 2 | Japan | 3 | 2 | 0 | 1 | 64 | 40 | +24 | 7 | Quarter-finals |
| 3 | New Zealand | 3 | 1 | 0 | 2 | 59 | 40 | +19 | 5 | Quarter-finals |
| 4 | Kenya | 3 | 0 | 0 | 3 | 19 | 90 | −71 | 3 | |

Source: World Rugby
Rules for classification: 1) Points; 2) Head-to-head result; 3) Point difference; 4) Points scored.

9 August 2016
12:00

| Great Britain | 31–7 | Kenya |
| Try: Norton 2' m Burgess 4' c Bibby (2) 6' m, 12' c Bennett 7' c Con: Mitchell (3/4); Bibby (0/1) | Report (Rio 2016); Report (World Rugby) | Try: Odhiambo 8' c Con: Adema (1/1) |

Deodoro Stadium, Rio de Janeiro
Referee: Alexandre Ruiz (France)

9 August 2016
12:30

| New Zealand | 12–14 | Japan |
| Try: Curry 6' c A. Ioane 10' m Con: Kaka (1/2) | Report (Rio 2016); Report (World Rugby) | Try: Goto 3' c Soejima 12' c Con: Lemeki (1/1); Sakai (1/1) |

Deodoro Stadium, Rio de Janeiro
Referee: Marius van der Westhuizen (South Africa)

9 August 2016
17:00

| Great Britain | 21–19 | Japan |
| Try: Rodwell (2) 1' c, 2' c Watson 13' c Con: Mitchell (3/3) | Report (Rio 2016); Report (World Rugby) | Try: Lemeki (2) 6' c, 14' m Sakai 11' c Con: Goya (1/1); Sakai (1/2) |

Deodoro Stadium, Rio de Janeiro
Referee: Nick Briant (New Zealand)

9 August 2016
17:30

| New Zealand | 28–5 | Kenya |
| Try: Penalty try 3' c Ioane 4' c Pulu 11' c Ormond 14' c Con: Pulu (3/3); Kaka (1/1) | Report (Rio 2016); Report (World Rugby) | Try: Injera 1' m Con: Adema (0/1) |

Deodoro Stadium, Rio de Janeiro
Referee: Federico Anselmi (Argentina)

10 August 2016
12:00

| Kenya | 7–31 | Japan |
| Try: Injera 4' c Con: Oliech (1/1) | Report (Rio 2016); Report (World Rugby) | Try: Hano 1' c Lemeki (2) 7' c, 13' m Goya 9' m Penalty try 11' c Con: Goya (3/5) |

Deodoro Stadium, Rio de Janeiro
Referee: Matthew O'Brien (Australia)

10 August 2016
12:30

| New Zealand | 19–21 | Great Britain |
| Try: R. Ioane 9' m Ware 11' c Ormond 13' c Con: Kaka (2/3) | Report (Rio 2016); Report (World Rugby) | Try: Bennett 2' c Davies 5' c Norton 7' c Con: Mitchell (3/3) |

Deodoro Stadium, Rio de Janeiro
Referee: Craig Joubert (South Africa)

=== Ranking of third-placed teams ===
The top two of the third-placed teams advance to the knockout rounds.

| Pos | Grp | Team | Pld | W | D | L | PF | PA | PD | Pts | Qualification |
|---|---|---|---|---|---|---|---|---|---|---|---|
| 1 | B | Australia | 3 | 2 | 0 | 1 | 52 | 48 | +4 | 7 | Knockout stage |
| 2 | C | New Zealand | 3 | 1 | 0 | 2 | 59 | 40 | +19 | 5 | Knockout stage |
| 3 | A | United States | 3 | 1 | 0 | 2 | 59 | 41 | +18 | 5 | |

Source: Rio2016
Rules for classification: 1) Points; 2) Point differential; 3) Points scored; 4) Lots drawn by World Rugby

== Knockout stage ==
The quarterfinals were scheduled for August 10, with the semifinals and finals scheduled for August 11.

=== 9–12th place playoff ===
Semi-finals
10 August 2016 – Deodoro Stadium
United States | 24
Brazil | 12
10 August 2016 – Deodoro Stadium
Spain | 14
Kenya | 12

9th Place Final
11 August 2016 – Deodoro Stadium
United States | 24
Spain | 12
11th Place
11 August 2016 – Deodoro Stadium
Brazil | 0
Kenya | 24

==== Semi-finals ====
10 August 2016
16:00

| United States | 24–12 | Brazil |
| Try: Isles (3) 4' m, 7' m, 10' c Barrett 6' c Con: Hughes (2/4) | Report (Rio 2016); Report (World Rugby) | Try: D. Sancery 3' m Bourda-Couhet 11' c Con: Duque (1/2) |

Deodoro Stadium, Rio de Janeiro
Referee: Ben Crouse (South Africa)

10 August 2016
16:30

| Spain | 14–12 | Kenya |
| Try: Poggi (2) 7' c, 8' c Con: Hernández (2/2) | Report (Rio 2016); Report (World Rugby) | Try: Amonde 4' m Odhiambo 12' c Con: Adema (0/1); Oliech (1/1) 12' |

Deodoro Stadium, Rio de Janeiro
Referee: Taku Otsuki (Japan)

==== 11th Place ====
11 August 2016
12:30

| Brazil | 0–24 | Kenya |
| | Report (Rio 2016); Report (World Rugby) | Try: Odhiambo (3) 1' m, 6' c, 10 c Ambaka 8' m Con: Oliech (1/2); Injera (0/1); Adema (1/1) |

Deodoro Stadium, Rio de Janeiro
Referee: Alexandre Ruiz (France)

==== 9th Place Final ====
11 August 2016
13:00

| United States | 24–12 | Spain |
| Try: Barrett 4' c Isles (2) 7' m, 14' m Unufe 12' c Con: Hughes (1/2); Wyles (1/2) | Report (Rio 2016); Report (World Rugby) | Try: Fontes 2' m López 10' c Con: Genua (0/1); Hernández (1/1) |

Deodoro Stadium, Rio de Janeiro
Referee: Rasta Rasivhenge (South Africa)

=== 5–8th place playoff ===
Semi-finals
11 August 2016 – Deodoro Stadium
New Zealand | 24
France | 19
11 August 2016 – Deodoro Stadium
Argentina | 26
Australia | 21

5th Place Final
11 August 2016 – Deodoro Stadium
New Zealand | 17
Argentina | 14
7th Place
11 August 2016 – Deodoro Stadium
France | 12
Australia | 10

==== Semi-finals ====
11 August 2016
13:30

| New Zealand | 24–19 | France |
| Try: Ware (2) 2' m, 12' c A. Ioane 8' m R. Ioane 10' c Con: Kaka (2/4) | Report (Rio 2016); Report (World Rugby) | Try: Parez (2) 4' c, 7' m Valleau 14' c Con: Bouhraoua (2/3) |

Deodoro Stadium, Rio de Janeiro
Referee: Federico Anselmi (Argentina)

11 August 2016
14:00

| Argentina | 26–21 | Australia |
| Try: Revol (2) 7' m, 10' c Moroni (2) 11' c, 14' c Con: Revol (3/4) | Report (Rio 2016); Report (World Rugby) | Try: Cusack (2) 1' c, 2' c Foley 6' c Con: Stannard (3/3) |

Deodoro Stadium, Rio de Janeiro
Referee: Marius van der Westhuizen (South Africa)

==== Seventh Place ====
11 August 2016
17:30

| France | 12–10 | Australia |
| Try: Bouhraoua 6' m Candelon 8' c Con: Bouhraoua (1/2) | Report (Rio 2016); Report (World Rugby) | Try: Hutchison 1' m Jenkins 13' m Con: Stannard (0/2) |

Deodoro Stadium, Rio de Janeiro
Referee: Nick Briant (New Zealand)

==== Fifth Place Final ====
11 August 2016
18:00

| New Zealand | 17–14 | Argentina |
| Try: A. Ioane 5' m Mikkelson 9' m R. Ioane 11' c Con: Pulu (0/2); Kaka (1/1) | Report (Rio 2016); Report (World Rugby) | Try: Imhoff 13' c Moroni 14' c Con: Revol (2/2) |

Deodoro Stadium, Rio de Janeiro
Referee: Craig Joubert (South Africa)

=== Medal playoff ===
Quarter-finals
10 August 2016 – Deodoro Stadium
Fiji | 12
New Zealand | 7
10 August 2016 – Deodoro Stadium
Japan | 12
France | 7
10 August 2016 – Deodoro Stadium
Great Britain | 5 (a.e.t.)
Argentina | 0
10 August 2016 – Deodoro Stadium
South Africa | 22
Australia | 5

Semi-finals
11 August 2016 – Deodoro Stadium
Fiji | 20
Japan | 5
11 August 2016 – Deodoro Stadium
Great Britain | 7
South Africa | 5

Gold Medal Match
11 August 2016 – Deodoro Stadium
Fiji | 43
Great Britain | 7
Bronze Medal Match
11 August 2016 – Deodoro Stadium
Japan | 14
South Africa | 54

==== Quarter-finals ====
10 August 2016
17:00

| Fiji | 12–7 | New Zealand |
| Try: Kolinisau 2' m Tuwai 8' c Con: Ravouvou (0/1); Kolinisau (1/1) | Report (Rio 2016); Report (World Rugby) | Try: Kaka 6' c Con: Pulu (1/1) |

Deodoro Stadium, Rio de Janeiro
Referee: Rasta Rasivhenge (South Africa)

10 August 2016
17:30

| Japan | 12–7 | France |
| Try: Tuqiri 8' m Goto 7' c Con: Sakai (1/2) | Report (Rio 2016); Report (World Rugby) | Try: Cler 4' c Con: Bouhraoua (1/1) |

Deodoro Stadium, Rio de Janeiro
Referee: Richard Kelly (New Zealand)

10 August 2016
18:00

| Great Britain | 5–0 (a.e.t.) | Argentina |
| Try: Bibby 18'; Pen: Mitchell (0/1) | Report (Rio 2016); Report (World Rugby) | Pen: Revol (0/1) |

Deodoro Stadium, Rio de Janeiro
Referee: Alexandre Ruiz (France)

10 August 2016
18:30

| South Africa | 22–5 | Australia |
| Try: Speckman 3' m Senatla 5' m, 12' m Brown 10' c Con: Afrika (1/4) | Report (Rio 2016); Report (World Rugby) | Try: Cusack 7' m Con: Clark (0/1) |

Deodoro Stadium, Rio de Janeiro
Referee: Mike Adamson (Great Britain)

==== Semi-finals ====
11 August 2016
14:30

| Fiji | 20–5 | Japan |
| Try: Ravouvou 1' m Tuisova 6' m Kunatani 9' m Tuwai 10' m Con: Ravouvou (0/3); Kolinisau (0/1) | Report (Rio 2016); Report (World Rugby) | Try: Goto 4' m Con: Lemeki (0/1) |

Deodoro Stadium, Rio de Janeiro
Referee: Mike Adamson (Great Britain)

11 August 2016
15:00

| Great Britain | 7–5 | South Africa |
| Try: Norton 8' c Con: Mitchell (1/1) | Report (Rio 2016); Report (World Rugby) | Try: Brown 2' m Con: Afrika (0/1) |

Deodoro Stadium, Rio de Janeiro
Referee: Richard Kelly (New Zealand)

==== Bronze-medal match ====
11 August 2016
18:30

| Japan | 14–54 | South Africa (bronze) |
| Try: Kuwazuru 8' c Goya 11' c Con: Goya (2/2) | Report (Rio 2016); Report (World Rugby) | Try: De Jongh 1' c Speckman (3) 3' c, 10' c, 19' c Afrika (2) 12' c, 15' c Geduld 17' m Kolbe 20' c Con: Afrika (5/6); Geduld (2/2) |

Deodoro Stadium, Rio de Janeiro
Referee: Alexandre Ruiz (France)

==== Gold-medal match ====
11 August 2016
19:00

| (gold) Fiji | 43–7 | Great Britain (silver) |
| Try: Kolinisau 1' m Tuwai 3' c Veremalua 7' m Nakarawa 8' m Ravouvou 10' c Tuisova 14' c Mata 19' c Con: Ravouvou (1/2); Kolinisau (2/4); Taliga (1/1) | Report (Rio 2016); Report (World Rugby) | Try: Norton 16' c Con: Watson (1/1) |

Deodoro Stadium, Rio de Janeiro
Referee: Rasta Rasivhenge (South Africa)

Team details

| Fiji | Great Britain |

| P | 3 | Semi Kunatani |
| L | 5 | Leone Nakarawa |
| H | 2 | Jasa Veremalua |
| FL | 7 | Osea Kolinisau (c) |
| FH | 10 | Samisoni Viriviri |
| C | 12 | Masivesi Dakuwaqa |
| SH | 9 | Seremaia Tuwai |
Substitutes:
| P | 1 | Apisai Domolailai |
| L | 4 | Viliame Mata |
| N | 8 | Josua Tuisova |
| FL | 6 | Kitione Taliga |
Head Coach:
(England) Ben Ryan

| P | 3 | Phil Burgess |
| N | 8 | James Davies |
| L | 5 | James Rodwell |
| C | 12 | Mark Bennett |
| FL | 7 | Dan Bibby |
| FL | 6 | Tom Mitchell (c) |
| L | 4 | Dan Norton |
Substitutes:
| FH | 10 | Sam Cross |
| SH | 9 | Ollie Lindsay-Hague |
| P | 1 | Mark Robertson |
| W | 11 | Marcus Watson |
| H | 2 | Ruaridh McConnochie |
Head Coach:
(England) Simon Amor

== Final ranking ==
| Rank | Team | Matches | Points | Avg points | Tries | Avg tries |
|---|---|---|---|---|---|---|
| 1st place, gold medalist(s) | Fiji | 6 | 160 | 26.67 | 26 | 4.33 |
| 2nd place, silver medalist(s) | Great Britain | 6 | 92 | 15.33 | 14 | 2.33 |
| 3rd place, bronze medalist(s) | South Africa | 6 | 136 | 22.67 | 22 | 3.67 |
| 4 | Japan | 6 | 95 | 15.83 | 15 | 2.50 |
| 5 | New Zealand | 6 | 107 | 17.83 | 17 | 2.83 |
| 6 | Argentina | 6 | 102 | 17.00 | 16 | 2.67 |
| 7 | France | 6 | 95 | 15.83 | 14 | 2.33 |
| 8 | Australia | 6 | 88 | 14.67 | 14 | 2.33 |
| 9 | United States | 5 | 107 | 21.4 | 17 | 3.40 |
| 10 | Spain | 5 | 43 | 8.6 | 7 | 1.40 |
| 11 | Kenya | 5 | 55 | 11.00 | 9 | 1.80 |
| 12 | Brazil | 5 | 24 | 4.8 | 4 | 0.80 |

== Player statistics ==
=== Try scorers ===
6 tries

- (United States) Carlin Isles

5 tries

- (Fiji) Josua Tuisova
- (Kenya) Billy Odhiambo
- (South Africa) Cecil Afrika

4 tries

- (Argentina) Matías Moroni
- (Australia) Tom Cusack
- (Fiji) Osea Kolinisau
- (France) Terry Bouhraoua
- (United Kingdom) Dan Norton
- (Japan) Lomano Lemeki
- (New Zealand) Akira Ioane
- (South Africa) Rosko Specman
- (Spain) Marcos Poggi
- (United States) Danny Barrett

3 tries

- (Argentina) Gastón Revol
- (Australia) Jesse Parahi
- (Fiji) Vatemo Ravouvou
- (Fiji) Jerry Tuwai
- (Fiji) Jasa Veremalua
- (United Kingdom) Dan Bibby
- (Japan) Teruya Goto
- (New Zealand) Rieko Ioane
- (New Zealand) Regan Ware
- (South Africa) Kyle Brown
- (South Africa) Seabelo Senatla

2 tries

- (Argentina) Santiago Álvarez
- (Argentina) Axel Müller
- (Australia) Con Foley
- (Australia) Ed Jenkins
- (Fiji) Semi Kunatani
- (Fiji) Viliame Mata
- (Fiji) Kitione Taliga
- (France) Damien Cler
- (France) Stephen Parez
- (France) Virimi Vakatawa
- (United Kingdom) Mark Bennett
- (United Kingdom) James Rodwell
- (Japan) Kazuhiro Goya
- (Kenya) Collins Injera
- (New Zealand) Lewis Ormond
- (South Africa) Justin Geduld
- (United States) Nate Ebner
- (United States) Maka Unufe

1 try

- (Argentina) Nicolás Bruzzone
- (Argentina) Pablo Fontes
- (Argentina) Juan Imhoff
- (Argentina) Ángel López
- (Argentina) Fernando Luna
- (Argentina) Franco Sábato
- (Argentina) Germán Schulz
- (Australia) Cameron Clark
- (Australia) Henry Hutchison
- (Australia) John Porch
- (Brazil) Gustavo Albuquerque
- (Brazil) Laurent Bourda-Couhet
- (Brazil) Felipe Claro
- (Brazil) Daniel Sancery
- (Fiji) Leone Nakarawa
- (Fiji) Samisoni Viriviri
- (France) Jérémy Aicardi
- (France) Julien Candelon
- (France) Manoël Dall'igna
- (France) Sacha Valleau
- (United Kingdom) Phil Burgess
- (United Kingdom) James Davies
- (United Kingdom) Marcus Watson
- (Japan) Kazushi Hano
- (Japan) Yusaku Kuwazuru
- (Japan) Katsuyuki Sakai
- (Japan) Kameli Soejima
- (Japan) Lote Tuqiri
- (Kenya) Willy Ambaka
- (Kenya) Andrew Amonde
- (New Zealand) Scott Curry
- (New Zealand) Gillies Kaka
- (New Zealand) Tim Mikkelson
- (New Zealand) Augustine Pulu
- (South Africa) Juan de Jongh
- (South Africa) Cheslin Kolbe
- (South Africa) Dylan Sage
- (South Africa) Kwagga Smith
- (South Africa) Philip Snyman
- (Spain) César Sempere
- (United States) Perry Baker
- (United States) Folau Niua

=== Point scorers ===
43 points

- (France) Terry Bouhraoua

42 points

- (South Africa) Cecil Afrika

38 points

- (Fiji) Osea Kolinisau

37 points

- (Argentina) Gastón Revol

30 points

- (United States) Carlin Isles

25 points

- (Fiji) Vatemo Ravouvou
- (Fiji) Josua Tuisova
- (Kenya) Billy Odhiambo

22 points

- (Japan) Kazuhiro Goya
- (Japan) Lomano Lemeki

20 points

- (Argentina) Matías Moroni
- (Australia) Tom Cusack
- (United Kingdom) Tom Mitchell
- (United Kingdom) Dan Norton
- (New Zealand) Akira Ioane
- (South Africa) Seabelo Senatla
- (South Africa) Roscko Speckman
- (Spain) Marcos Poggi
- (United States) Danny Barrett
- (United States) Madison Hughes

19 points

- (New Zealand) Gillies Kaka

15 points

- (Australia) Jesse Parahi
- (Fiji) Jerry Tuwai
- (Fiji) Jasa Veremalua
- (United Kingdom) Dan Bibby
- (Japan) Teruya Goto
- (New Zealand) Rieko Ioane
- (New Zealand) Regan Ware
- (South Africa) Kyle Brown

14 points

- (South Africa) Justin Geduld

13 points

- (New Zealand) Augustine Pulu

12 points

- (Australia) James Stannard
- (Fiji) Kitione Taliga

11 points

- (Japan) Katsuyuki Sakai

10 points

- (Argentina) Santiago Álvarez
- (Argentina) Axel Müller
- (Australia) Con Foley
- (Australia) Ed Jenkins
- (Fiji) Semi Kunatani
- (Fiji) Viliame Mata
- (France) Damien Cler
- (France) Stephen Parez
- (France) Virimi Vakatawa
- (United Kingdom) Mark Bennett
- (United Kingdom) James Rodwell
- (Kenya) Collins Injera
- (New Zealand) Lewis Ormond
- (United States) Nate Ebner
- (United States) Maka Unufe

8 points

- (Spain) Francisco Hernández

7 points

- (United Kingdom) Marcus Watson

6 points

- (Australia) James Stannard
- (Kenya) Samuel Oliech

5 points

- (Argentina) Nicolás Bruzzone
- (Argentina) Pablo Fontes
- (Argentina) Juan Imhoff
- (Argentina) Ángel López
- (Argentina) Fernando Luna
- (Argentina) Franco Sábato
- (Argentina) Germán Schulz
- (Australia) Cameron Clark
- (Australia) Henry Hutchison
- (Australia) John Porch
- (Brazil) Gustavo Albuquerque
- (Brazil) Laurent Bourda-Couhet
- (Brazil) Felipe Claro
- (Brazil) Daniel Sancery
- (Fiji) Leone Nakarawa
- (Fiji) Samisoni Viriviri
- (France) Jérémy Aicardi
- (France) Julien Candelon
- (France) Manoël Dall'igna
- (France) Sacha Valleau
- (United Kingdom) Phil Burgess
- (United Kingdom) James Davies
- (Japan) Kazushi Hano
- (Japan) Yusaku Kuwazuru
- (Japan) Kameli Soejima
- (Japan) Lote Tuqiri
- (Kenya) Willy Ambaka
- (Kenya) Andrew Amonde
- (New Zealand) Scott Curry
- (New Zealand) Tim Mikkelson
- (South Africa) Juan de Jongh
- (South Africa) Cheslin Kolbe
- (South Africa) Dylan Sage
- (South Africa) Kwagga Smith
- (South Africa) Philip Snyman
- (Spain) César Sempere
- (United States) Perry Baker
- (United States) Folau Niua

4 points

- (Kenya) Biko Adema

2 points

- (Brazil) Lucas Duque
- (Brazil) André Silva
- (France) Vincent Inigo
- (United States) Chris Wyles

== See also ==
- Rugby sevens at the 2016 Summer Olympics – Women's tournament
