= Rugby sevens at the 2018 Commonwealth Games =

- Venue: Robina Stadium
- Location: Gold Coast, Australia
- Dates: 13–15 April 2018
- Competitors: 312 from 16 nations

Rugby sevens at the 2018 Commonwealth Games was the sixth appearance of Rugby sevens at the Commonwealth Games but the debut of the women's tournament. The rugby sevens competition at the 2018 Commonwealth Games was held at Robina Stadium in the Gold Coast, Australia, from April 13 to 15.

This is the sixth edition of the men's competition, following its debut at the 1998 Games, with women's rugby sevens making its debut after a successful the 2016 Summer Olympics tournament in Rio de Janeiro. A total of sixteen men's and eight women's teams are scheduled to compete (312 athletes, at 12 per team plus one traveling reserve) in each respective tournament.

== Competition schedule ==
The following is the competition schedule for the Rugby sevens competitions:

P	Pool stage	CM	Classification matches	½	Semi-finals	B	Bronze Medal Match	F	Gold Medal Match

Event↓/Date →	Fri 13	Sat 14		Sun 15				
Event	E	M	E	M				
Men		P		CM	½	CM	B	F
Women	P			CM	½	CM	B	F

== Medal table ==
* Host nation (Australia)

Rank	Nation	Gold	Silver	Bronze	Total
1	New Zealand	2	0	0	2
2	Australia*	0	1	0	1
2	Fiji	0	1	0	1
4	England	0	0	2	2
Totals (4 entries)		2	2	2	6

== Medalists ==
Event	Gold	Silver	Bronze
Men	New Zealand; Scott Curry; Tim Mikkelson; Trael Joass; Etene Nanai-Seturo; Dylan Collier; Vilimoni Koroi; Sam Dickson; Andrew Knewstubb; Regan Ware; Kurt Baker; Akuila Rokolisoa; Sione Molia	Fiji; Sevuloni Mocenacagi; Josua Vakurunabili; Kalione Nasoko; Paula Dranisinukula; Semi Kunatani; Jasa Veremalua; Mesulame Kunavula; Vatemo Ravouvou; Jerry Tuwai; Alosio Naduva; Eroni Sau; Amenoni Nasilasila; Samisoni Viriviri	England; Richard de Carpentier; Mike Ellery; Phil Burgess; Dan Norton; James Rodwell; Tom Mitchell; Dan Bibby; Alex Davis; Ollie Lindsay-Hague; Ruaridh McConnochie; Ethan Waddleton; Harry Glover
Women	New Zealand; Alena Saili; Shakira Baker; Stacey Waaka; Niall Williams; Sarah Goss; Michaela Blyde; Tyla Nathan-Wong; Kelly Brazier; Gayle Broughton; Theresa Fitzpatrick; Portia Woodman; Tenika Willison; Risi Pouri-Lane	Australia; Shannon Parry; Sharni Williams; Demi Hayes; Dom Du Toit; Emma Tonegato; Vani Pelite; Charlotte Caslick; Cassie Staples; Emma Sykes (rugby union); Alicia Quirk; Emilee Cherry; Ellia Green; Georgie Friedrichs	England; Claire Allan; Abbie Brown; Lydia Thompson; Emily Scarratt; Natasha Hunt; Deborah Fleming; Heather Fisher; Emily Scott; Alex Matthews; Megan Jones; Jess Breach; Amy Wilson-Hardy; Victoria Fleetwood

== Qualification ==
A total of sixteen men's teams and eight women's team will qualify to compete at the games. Each nation may enter one team in each tournament (12 athletes per team plus one traveling reserve) for a maximum total of 26 athletes.

== Men's competition ==
Pool A	Pool B	Pool C	Pool D
South Africa; Scotland; Papua New Guinea; Malaysia	England; Australia (hosts); Samoa; Jamaica	New Zealand; Canada; Kenya; Zambia	Fiji; Wales; Uganda; Sri Lanka

== Women’s competition ==
Pool A	Pool B
New Zealand; Canada; South Africa; Kenya	Australia (hosts); Fiji; England; Wales

== Participating nations ==
There are 16 participating nations at the rugby sevens competitions with a total of 312 athletes.

- Australia (26 athletes)
- Canada (26)
- England (26)
- Fiji (26)
- Jamaica (13)
- Kenya (26)
- Malaysia (13)
- New Zealand (26)
- Papua New Guinea (13)
- Samoa (13)
- Scotland (13)
- South Africa (26)
- Sri Lanka (13)
- Uganda (13)
- Wales (26)
- Zambia (13)
