= Rugby sevens at the 2016 Summer Olympics =

Rugby sevens at the Games of the XXXI Olympiad
- Venue: Deodoro Stadium
- Dates: 6–11 August 2016
- No. of events: 2
- Competitors: 288 from 14 nations

Rugby sevens at the 2016 Summer Olympics was held over six days in August 2016 in Rio de Janeiro. The 2016 Olympics was the debut for rugby sevens at the Summer Olympics, though rugby union was last played at the 1924 games.

The usual laws of rugby sevens applied.

== Changes ==
Though rugby has not been featured in the Olympics since the 1924 Summer Olympics in any form, the IOC chose to re-introduce the seven-a-side version of the sport for the games. The sport was featured for the 2016 and the 2020 Summer Olympics.

== Venue ==
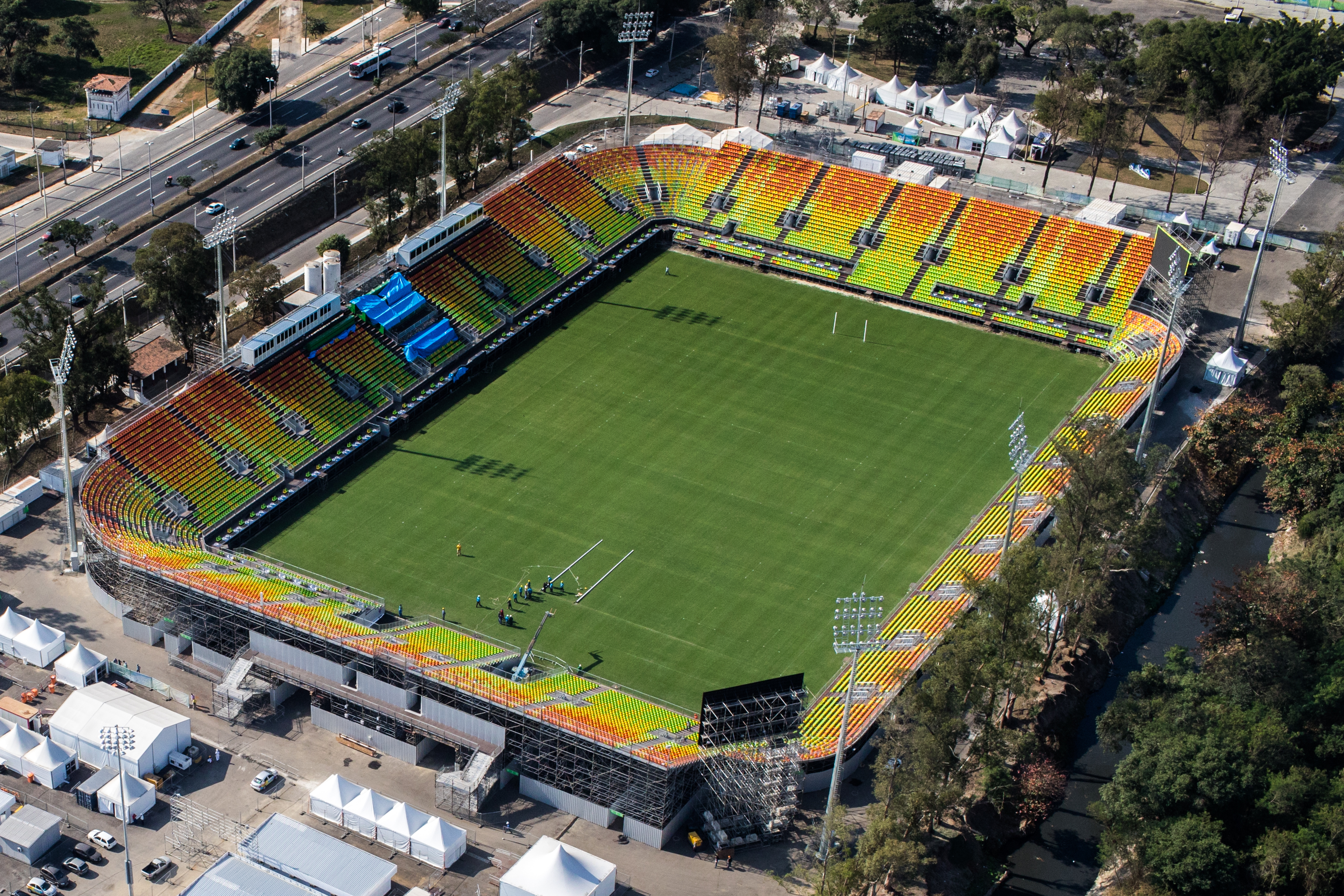
Aerial view of the Deodoro Stadium, a temporary 15,000-seat stadium where all matches of Rugby sevens were held during the 2016 Summer Olympics.

The rugby competition took place in a temporary arena at Deodoro Stadium. The original plan was to stage the rugby matches at the São Januário Stadium. However this was scrapped because the club in charge of the venue missed the deadline to present its project. The Organising Committee considered Estádio Olímpico João Havelange, which would have had to have been shared with the athletics competitions. It was later announced that the rugby competition will take place in a temporary arena at Deodoro Stadium, shared with the modern pentathlon. In April 2016 concerns were raised by the World Rugby head of competitions and performance, Mark Egan, about progress of construction at the temporary 15,000-seater stadium.

== Qualification ==
Brazil men’s and women’s teams automatically qualified for the events. Qualification began with the 2014–15 Sevens World Series (men's) and 2014–15 World Rugby Women's Sevens Series, where the 4 teams at the top of the standings qualified for the 2016 Olympic Games. In June–September 2015, each of the six regional rugby unions held an Olympic qualification event, where one team from each region qualified. The final spot will be determined by a repechage tournament. It will comprise 16 teams from the regional qualifiers: 4 from Europe, 3 from Africa, 3 from Asia, 2 from Oceania, 2 from North America and 2 from South America.

As a result of Great Britain competing as one union in the Olympics and as several in international rugby (England, Wales, Scotland and Northern Irish players that choose to play for the Irish Rugby Union), should one of either the England, Wales or Scotland teams qualify then Great Britain will be awarded a spot in the Olympic Games. These three British unions agreed in advance of the 2013–14 men's and women's Sevens World Series that their highest-finishing teams in that season would represent all three unions in the first stage of qualification in both 2014–15 series. The England men's and women's teams earned the right to represent the British unions in that stage of their respective competitions. The unions will then decide the composition of the Great Britain team. Players based in Northern Ireland are part of the Irish Rugby Football Union and the IRFU demanded that Northern Irish players, that have committed to play for the Irish rugby union, only play for Ireland despite being eligible under IOC rules to compete for Great Britain.

The world governing body for the sport renamed itself from the International Rugby Board to World Rugby (WR) effective 19 November 2014.

=== Men's tournament ===
Means of qualification	Date of completion	Venue	Berths	Qualified
Host nation	2 October 2009	(Denmark) Copenhagen	1	Brazil
2014–15 Sevens World Series	17 May 2015	Various	4	Fiji
2014–15 Sevens World Series	17 May 2015	Various	4	Great Britain
2014–15 Sevens World Series	17 May 2015	Various	4	New Zealand
2014–15 Sevens World Series	17 May 2015	Various	4	South Africa
2015 CONSUR Sevens	7 June 2015	(Argentina) Santa Fe	1	Argentina
2015 NACRA Sevens	14 June 2015	(United States) Cary	1	United States
2015 Rugby Europe Grand Prix Series	12 July 2015	Various	1	France
2015 ARFU Sevens Championships	8 November 2015	Hong Kong	1	Japan
2015 Oceania Sevens Championship	15 November 2015	(New Zealand) Auckland	1	Australia
2015 Africa Cup Sevens	15 November 2015	(South Africa) Johannesburg	1	Kenya
2016 Final Olympic Qualification Tournament	19 June 2016	(Monaco) Fontvieille	1	Spain
Total			12	

=== Women's tournament ===
Means of qualification	Date of completion	Venue	Berths	Qualified
Host nation	2 October 2009	(Denmark) Copenhagen	1	Brazil
2014–15 World Rugby Women's Sevens Series	23 May 2015	Various	4	Australia
2014–15 World Rugby Women's Sevens Series	23 May 2015	Various	4	Canada
2014–15 World Rugby Women's Sevens Series	23 May 2015	Various	4	Great Britain
2014–15 World Rugby Women's Sevens Series	23 May 2015	Various	4	New Zealand
2015 CONSUR Women's Sevens	7 June 2015	(Argentina) Santa Fe	1	Colombia
2015 NACRA Women's Sevens	14 June 2015	(United States) Cary	1	United States
2015 Rugby Europe Sevens Grand Prix	21 June 2015	Various	1	France
2015 Women's Africa Cup Sevens	27 September 2015	(South Africa) Johannesburg	1	Kenya^{[1]}
2015 Oceania Women's Sevens Championship	15 November 2015	(New Zealand) Auckland	1	Fiji
2015 ARFU Women's Sevens Championships	29 November 2015	Various	1	Japan
2016 Final Olympic Qualification Tournament	26 June 2016	(Republic of Ireland) Dublin	1	Spain
Total			12	

1. South Africa won the continental qualifier, but did not participate in the 2016 Olympics. The South African Sports Confederation and Olympic Committee's qualification criteria do not permit qualification via the continental route. Kenya, as the second-placed team in the African qualifiers, advanced to the Olympics.

== Men's competition ==
=== Group stage ===
==== Group A ====
Pos	Team	Pld	W	D	L	PF	PA	PD	Pts	Qualification
1	Fiji	3	3	0	0	85	45	+40	9	Quarter-finals
2	Argentina	3	2	0	1	62	35	+27	7	Quarter-finals
3	United States	3	1	0	2	59	41	+18	5	
4	Brazil	3	0	0	3	12	97	−85	3	

Source: World Rugby
Rules for classification: 1) Points; 2) Head-to-head result; 3) Point difference; 4) Points scored.

==== Group B ====
Pos	Team	Pld	W	D	L	PF	PA	PD	Pts	Qualification
1	South Africa	3	2	0	1	55	12	+43	7	Quarter-finals
2	France	3	2	0	1	57	45	+12	7	Quarter-finals
3	Australia	3	2	0	1	52	48	+4	7	Quarter-finals
4	Spain	3	0	0	3	17	76	−59	3	

Source: World Rugby
Rules for classification: 1) Points; 2) Head-to-head result; 3) Point difference; 4) Points scored.

==== Group C ====
Pos	Team	Pld	W	D	L	PF	PA	PD	Pts	Qualification
1	Great Britain	3	3	0	0	73	45	+28	9	Quarter-finals
2	Japan	3	2	0	1	64	40	+24	7	Quarter-finals
3	New Zealand	3	1	0	2	59	40	+19	5	Quarter-finals
4	Kenya	3	0	0	3	19	90	−71	3	

Source: World Rugby
Rules for classification: 1) Points; 2) Head-to-head result; 3) Point difference; 4) Points scored.

=== Knockout stage ===
Quarter-finals
10 August 2016 – Deodoro Stadium
Fiji	12
New Zealand	7
10 August 2016 – Deodoro Stadium
Japan	12
France	7
10 August 2016 – Deodoro Stadium
Great Britain (a.e.t.)	5
Argentina	0
10 August 2016 – Deodoro Stadium
South Africa	22
Australia	5

Semi-finals
11 August 2016 – Deodoro Stadium
Fiji	20
Japan	5
11 August 2016 – Deodoro Stadium
Great Britain	7
South Africa	5

Gold Medal Match
11 August 2016 – Deodoro Stadium
Fiji	43
Great Britain	7
Bronze Medal Match
11 August 2016 – Deodoro Stadium
Japan	14
South Africa	54

== Women's competition ==
=== Group stage ===
==== Group A ====
Pos	Team	Pld	W	D	L	PF	PA	PD	Pts	Qualification
1	Australia	3	2	1	0	101	12	+89	8	Quarter-finals
2	Fiji	3	2	0	1	48	43	+5	7	Quarter-finals
3	United States	3	1	1	1	67	24	+43	6	Quarter-finals
4	Colombia	3	0	0	3	0	137	−137	3	

Source: World Rugby
Rules for classification: 1) Points; 2) Head-to-head result; 3) Point difference; 4) Points scored.

==== Group B ====
Pos	Team	Pld	W	D	L	PF	PA	PD	Pts	Qualification
1	New Zealand	3	3	0	0	109	12	+97	9	Quarter-finals
2	France	3	2	0	1	71	40	+31	7	Quarter-finals
3	Spain	3	1	0	2	31	65	−34	5	Quarter-finals
4	Kenya	3	0	0	3	17	111	−94	3	

Source: World Rugby
Rules for classification: 1) Points; 2) Head-to-head result; 3) Point difference; 4) Points scored.

==== Group C ====
Pos	Team	Pld	W	D	L	PF	PA	PD	Pts	Qualification
1	Great Britain	3	3	0	0	91	3	+88	9	Quarter-finals
2	Canada	3	2	0	1	83	22	+61	7	Quarter-finals
3	Brazil (H)	3	1	0	2	29	77	−48	5	
4	Japan	3	0	0	3	10	111	−101	3	

Source: World Rugby
Rules for classification: 1) Points; 2) Head-to-head result; 3) Point difference; 4) Points scored.
(H) Hosts

=== Knockout stage ===
Quarter-finals
7 August 2016 – Deodoro Stadium
Australia	24
Spain	0
7 August 2016 – Deodoro Stadium
Canada	15
France	5
7 August 2016 – Deodoro Stadium
Great Britain	26
Fiji	7
7 August 2016 – Deodoro Stadium
New Zealand	5
United States	0

Semi-finals
8 August 2016 – Deodoro Stadium
Australia	17
Canada	5
8 August 2016 – Deodoro Stadium
Great Britain	7
New Zealand	25

Gold Medal Match
8 August 2016 – Deodoro Stadium
Australia	24
New Zealand	17
Bronze Medal Match
8 August 2016 – Deodoro Stadium
Canada	33
Great Britain	10

== Competition schedule ==
The competition will run August 6–11.

In the Men's tournament, pool A consists of Fiji, Argentina, USA and Brazil. Pool B includes South Africa, Australia, France and Spain while pool C consists of New Zealand, Great Britain, Kenya and Japan.

In the Women's tournament pool A consists of Australia, USA, Fiji and Colombia. Pool B includes New Zealand, France, Spain and Kenya while pool C consists of Canada, Great Britain, Brazil and Japan.

== Medal summary ==
=== Medal table ===
Rank	Nation	Gold	Silver	Bronze	Total
1	Australia	1	0	0	1
1	Fiji	1	0	0	1
3	Great Britain	0	1	0	1
3	New Zealand	0	1	0	1
5	Canada	0	0	1	1
5	South Africa	0	0	1	1
Totals (6 entries)		2	2	2	6

=== Winners ===
Event	Gold	Silver	Bronze
Men's tournament	Fiji (FIJ): Masivesi Dakuwaqa*; Apisai Domolailai; Osea Kolinisau; Semi Kunatani; Viliame Mata; Leone Nakarawa; Vatemo Ravouvou; Kitione Taliga; Josua Tuisova; Jerry Tuwai; Jasa Veremalua; Samisoni Viriviri; Savenaca Rawaca	Great Britain (GBR): Mark Bennett; Dan Bibby; Phil Burgess; Sam Cross; James Davies; Ollie Lindsay-Hague; Ruaridh McConnochie; Tom Mitchell; Dan Norton; Mark Robertson; James Rodwell; Marcus Watson	South Africa (RSA): Cecil Afrika; Tim Agaba; Kyle Brown; Juan de Jongh; Justin Geduld; Francois Hougaard*; Werner Kok; Cheslin Kolbe; Dylan Sage; Kwagga Smith; Philip Snyman; Roscko Speckman; Seabelo Senatla
Women's tournament	Australia (AUS): Nicole Beck; Charlotte Caslick; Emilee Cherry; Chloe Dalton; Gemma Etheridge; Ellia Green; Shannon Parry; Evania Pelite; Alicia Quirk; Emma Tonegato; Amy Turner; Sharni Williams	New Zealand (NZL): Shakira Baker; Kelly Brazier; Gayle Broughton; Theresa Fitzpatrick; Sarah Goss; Huriana Manuel; Kayla McAlister; Tyla Nathan-Wong; Terina Te Tamaki; Ruby Tui; Niall Williams; Portia Woodman	Canada (CAN): Brittany Benn; Hannah Darling; Bianca Farella; Jen Kish; Ghislaine Landry; Megan Lukan; Kayla Moleschi; Karen Paquin; Kelly Russell; Ashley Steacy; Natasha Watcham-Roy; Charity Williams

- Injury replacement. IOC later provided a 13th medal to Fiji & SA for injured players.

== Team issues ==
=== Great Britain and Northern Ireland ===
The international structure of rugby union with respect to Great Britain and Northern Ireland is similar to that of association football, but with its own unique features. In football, the four Home Nations within the United Kingdom (England, Wales, Scotland and Northern Ireland) all field separate national teams, which led to a controversy over how to field a combined Great Britain football team at the 2012 Olympics. The Republic of Ireland fields its own national team in football. In rugby union, the three Home Nations that share the island of Great Britain also have their own national teams. Ireland, by contrast, is not divided for rugby purposes—the sport is organised on an All-Ireland basis, with a single governing body for the entire island. Great Britain will get a chance to field a combined team.

This structure led to some minor issues regarding participation of a Great Britain team in the qualifying stages of the 2016 Games. Due to a tradition of cooperation between the governing bodies of England, Wales, Scotland and Ireland—especially during the quadrennial tours of the Southern Hemisphere by the unified British and Irish Lions 15-a-side team—these were far less contentious than in football; as early as 2011, World Rugby (then known as the International Rugby Board) endorsed the concept of a united Great Britain team for the 2016 Games.

In August 2012, a provisional plan was announced by which England, Scotland and Wales would all be able to qualify as a Great Britain sevens team for the 2016 Games. The first qualifying stage is planned to be the 2014–2015 men's Sevens World Series and World Rugby Women's Sevens Series, with the top four teams of each sex at the end of that season advancing to the Games. All three nations are "core teams" that participate in every event of the men's Sevens Series; the Women's Sevens Series began in 2012–2013 with England as one of the six core teams. Qualifying will continue with regional tournaments and a final worldwide Olympic qualifier. Should any of the three teams finish in a qualifying spot at any stage, Great Britain will send a team to the Games. The final composition of a Great Britain team would then be determined by the three nations and the British Olympic Association.

As is the case with olympic boxing, rugby in Ireland is organised on an all-island basis. This means that Northern Irish players who have chosen to represent Ireland in rugby, despite the fact that they are residents of the UK, must play for the IRFU and thus must compete for Ireland. Northern Irish players who have qualified to play international rugby for the other home nations could still play for Great Britain.

=== Brazil ===
Another issue was to make Brazil's automatically qualifying team competitive. In an attempt to address this for the women's tournament, the IRB announced in August 2013 that Brazil would be an invited core team in the Women's Sevens World Series for at least the 2013–14 season.

== See also ==
- Rugby union at the Summer Olympics (15-a-side Rugby union, 1900–1924)
- Wheelchair rugby at the 2016 Summer Paralympics
