= Steeve Barry =

French rugby seven back

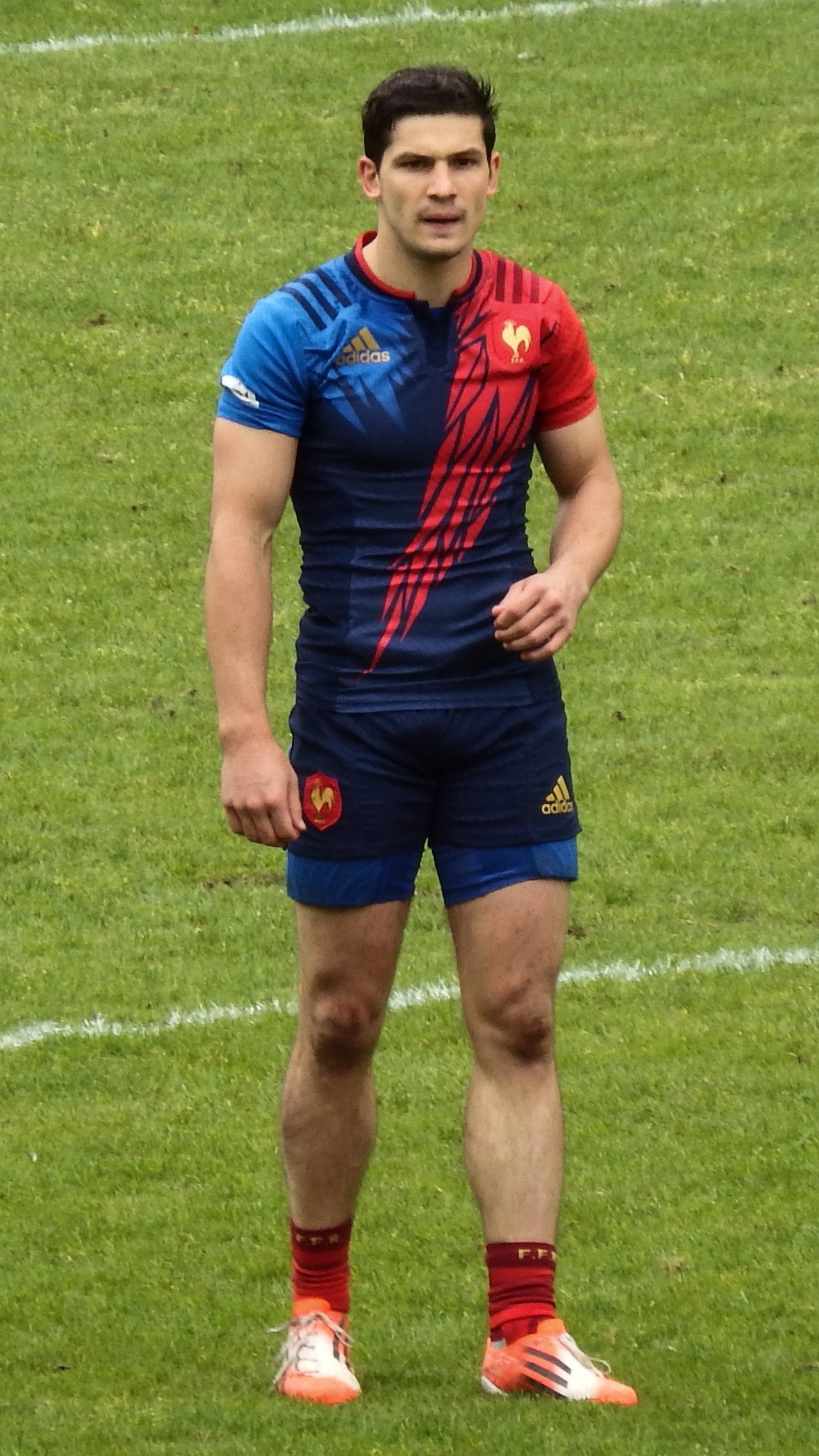
- Barry in 2016

Personal information
- Born: 18 April 1991 (age 35) Ruffec, Charente, France
- Height: 181 cm (5 ft 11 in)
- Weight: 85 kg (187 lb)

Sport
- Sport: Rugby seven
- Position: Back
- Club: Biarritz Olympique
- Coached by: Frederic Pomarel (national)

Steeve Barry (born 18 April 1991) is a French rugby seven back who competed at the 2016 Olympics.
