= Lewis Ormond =

New Zealand rugby union player (born 1994)

- Born: 5 February 1994 (age 32) Hāwera, New Zealand
- Height: 1.95 m (6 ft 5 in)
- Weight: 100 kg (220 lb; 15 st 10 lb)
- School: New Plymouth Boys' High School
- Notable relative: Jackson Ormond (brother)

Rugby union career
- Position(s): Centre, Wing, Fullback
Senior career
Years	Team	Apps	(Points)
2017–2019	Southland	28	(40)
2020	Taranaki	11	(15)
2021	Aurillac	3	(0)
- Correct as of 1 December 2023
National sevens team
Years	Team		Comps
2015–	New Zealand		21
- Correct as of 1 December 2023
Medal record
Men's rugby sevens
Representing New Zealand
Rugby World Cup Sevens
Silver medal – second place	2022 Cape Town	Team competition

Lewis Ormond (born 5 February 1994) is a New Zealand professional rugby union player who plays as a back for the New Zealand national sevens team.

== International career ==
Born in Hāwera, Ormond was a New Zealand under-20 trialist and had three seasons in the Taranaki Sevens setup under Willie Rickards. Ormond was first selected for the New Zealand Sevens for the 2015 Hong Kong Sevens after impressing at the National Rugby Sevens Tournament in January. Ormond made his debut at the Hong Kong Sevens along with Jordan Bunce of Manawatu., and now plays for Stade Aurillacois.

Ormond earned sevens caps in the 2015–16 World Rugby Sevens Series and was selected for the New Zealand Sevens team for the inaugural 2016 Summer Olympics rugby sevens tournament.

Ormond was selected for the All Blacks Sevens squad for the 2022 Rugby World Cup Sevens in Cape Town. He won a silver medal after his side lost to Fiji in the gold medal final.

== Personal life ==
Of Māori descent, Ormond affiliates to the Ngāti Kahungunu iwi. He is the brother of Jackson Ormond, a rugby player for Taranaki in the Mitre 10 Cup and former New Zealand Sevens player, whom he cites as his inspiration for his rugby career.
