= James Rodwell =

English rugby union player

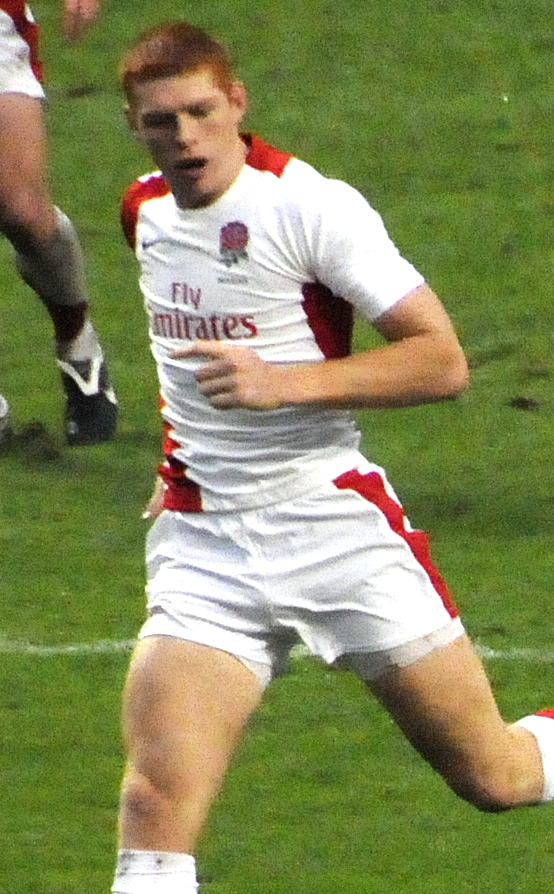
- Rodwell at the 2009 Hong Kong Sevens
- Born: 23 August 1984 (age 42) Wendover, Buckinghamshire, England
- Height: 1.95 m (6 ft 5 in)
- Weight: 106 kg (234 lb)

Rugby union career
- Position: Forward
National sevens team
Years	Team	Comps
2008–	England	93
Medal record
Men's rugby sevens
Representing Great Britain
Olympic Games
Silver medal – second place	2016 Rio de Janeiro	Team competition
Representing England
Commonwealth Games
Bronze medal – third place	2018 Gold Coast	Team competition
Representing England
World Cup 7’s
Silver medal – second place	2013 Moscow World Cup	{{{2}}}
Silver medal – second place	2018 San Francisco World Cup	{{{2}}}

James Rodwell (born 23 August 1984) is an English professional rugby sevens player who was part of the national squad from 2008 to 2019. He ended his career with records as the Worlds most capped sevens player, having played in the most consecutive tournaments (69) and most tournaments (93) in the World Rugby Sevens Series.

James is now Assistant coach for the Men's and Women's England Sevens teams.

== Early life ==
Rodwell was born in Wendover and began his education at Osmington School, Tring. He began playing rugby at the age of seven at Tring RFC, his local club. From the age of ten he played for Berkhamsted Collegiate School, figuring at centre and full-back.

Rodwell rapidly rose through representative squads, playing with Hertfordshire Schools 18 Group, London & South East U18, captaining North Midlands U20 and representing Midlands U20. During his time at Moseley Rugby Club in Birmingham, Rodwell was voted the U21 player of the year in 2004–05, the players’ player in 2006–07, and supporters’ player in 2008–09.

At Birmingham University Rodwell played mainly at Number 8 for the first team, developing into a key member of the leadership group of a club which valued on-field performance as well as social development.

In 2005 he was selected for English Universities, followed by England Counties (2006) and England Sevens (2008).

He completed his studies with a degree in Business Commerce.

== Sevens ==
Rodwell made his England sevens debut against the United States at Dubai in 2008.

James was named IRB player of the tournament in the 2010 Dubai leg of the series. He represented England in the 2010 Commonwealth Games in Delhi where the team finished fourth. He also represented England in the 2014 Commonwealth Games in Glasgow where the team finished fifth. Rodwell also won the Mark of Excellency award in the 2019 London 7's which also marks his last tournament in front of his home fans.

== Honours ==
- Silver Medal (Great Britain): Rugby sevens at the 2016 Summer Olympics
- National Trophy: 2009
- IRB player of the tournament Dubai 7s: 2010
- Wellington 7s: 2009 and 2013
- London 7s: 2009
- Dubai 7s: 2010 and 2011
- Tokyo 7s: 2015
- Cape Town 7s: 2016
- Vancouver 7s: 2017
