= Manoël Dall'igna =

French rugby sevens player

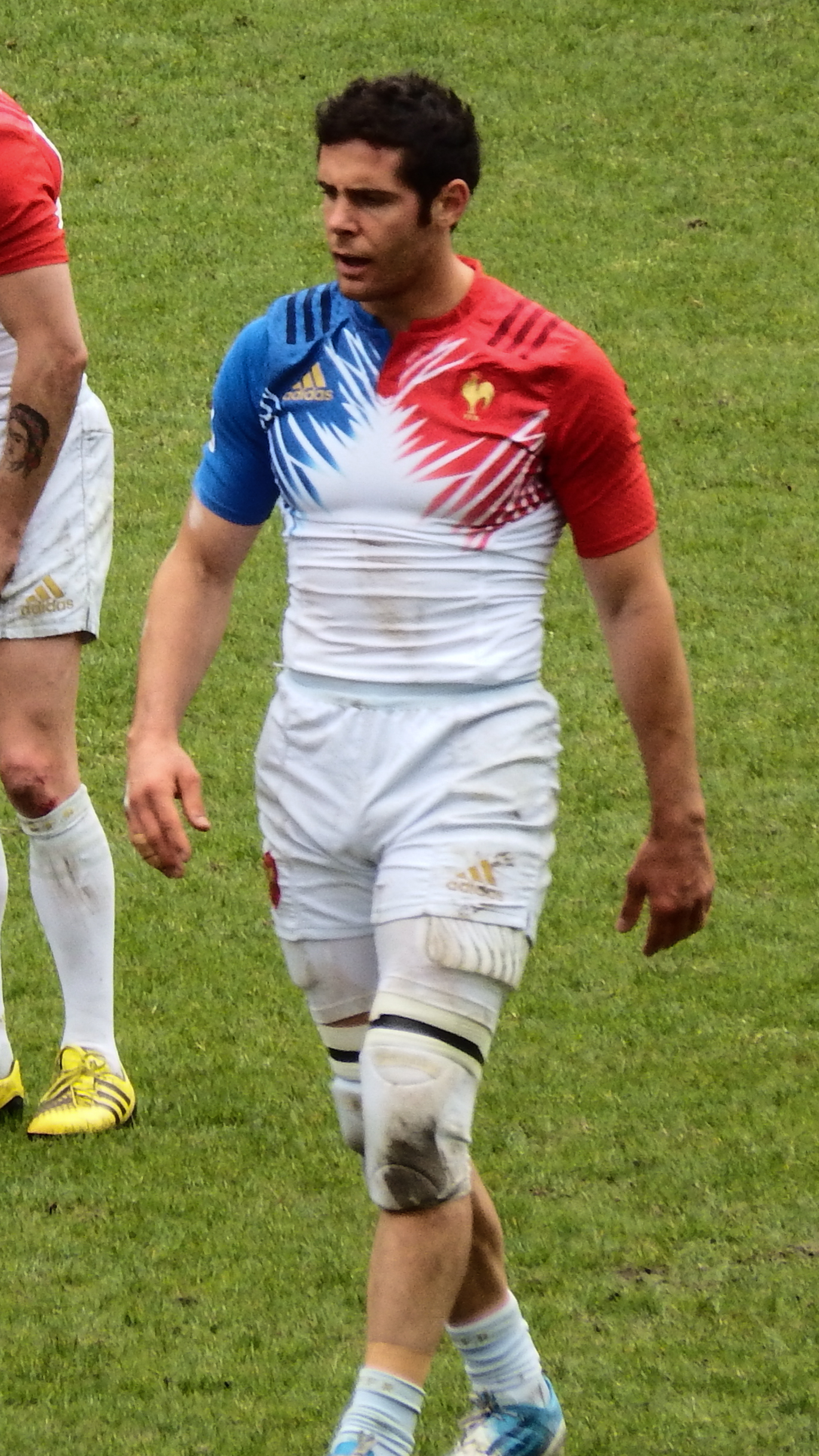
- Dall'igna in 2016

Personal information
- Born: 12 March 1985 (age 41)
- Height: 183 cm (6 ft 0 in)
- Weight: 92 kg (203 lb)

Sport
- Sport: Rugby seven
- Position: Forward
- Coached by: Frederic Pomarel (national)

Manoël Dall'igna (born 12 March 1985) is a French rugby sevens forward who competed at the 2016 Olympics.
