= Dan Bibby =

- Born: 6 February 1991 (age 35) Aspull, Greater Manchester, England
- Height: 1.76 m (5 ft 9 in)
- Weight: 89 kg (196 lb)
- School: Kirkham Grammar School
- University: Cardiff Metropolitan University

Rugby union career
- Position: Fly half
Amateur team(s)
Years	Team	Apps	(Points)
- Aspull
Senior career
Years	Team	Apps	(Points)
2011	Sale Sharks	0	(0)
National sevens teams
Years	Team		Comps
2012–	England		25
2016	Great Britain		
Medal record
Men's rugby sevens
Representing Great Britain
Olympic Games
Silver medal – second place	2016 Rio de Janeiro	Team competition
Representing England
Commonwealth Games
Bronze medal – third place	2018 Gold Coast	Team competition

Dan Bibby (born 6 February 1991) is an English rugby sevens player from Aspull, Wigan, Greater Manchester. He currently plays internationally as a fly half for the England national rugby sevens team and the Great Britain national rugby sevens team.

== Youth and early career ==
Bibby attended Kirkham Grammar School. Bibby started playing for Aspull RFC, the only rugby union club in his area since Wigan is better known for rugby league. He later moved to play as a fly half for Fylde Rugby Club in 2008 and a year later was chosen to represent England Students in rugby union.

He later attended Cardiff Metropolitan University where he studied sports science and where he represented them in the British Universities and Colleges sevens competition final at Twickenham Stadium. After that he was invited by Sale Sharks to join them for the summer in 2011 and played for them in the Premiership Rugby Sevens Series.

== International career ==
Bibby was called up to play for the England national rugby sevens team in 2012 in the Scotland Sevens. He also competed for England at the 2014 Commonwealth Games. In 2016, Bibby declared his intention to play at the 2016 Summer Olympics for the Great Britain national rugby sevens team. However he received a shoulder injury in the Australian Sevens which could have jeopardized his participation, however he was able to rejoin the Great Britain team for training. In July he was chosen for the final Great Britain Olympic team. In the quarter-finals of the Olympic rugby sevens tournament, Bibby scored the decisive try and golden point in extra time for Great Britain against the Argentina national rugby sevens team after a 0–0 draw.
