= Damien Cler =

French rugby seven forward (born 1983)

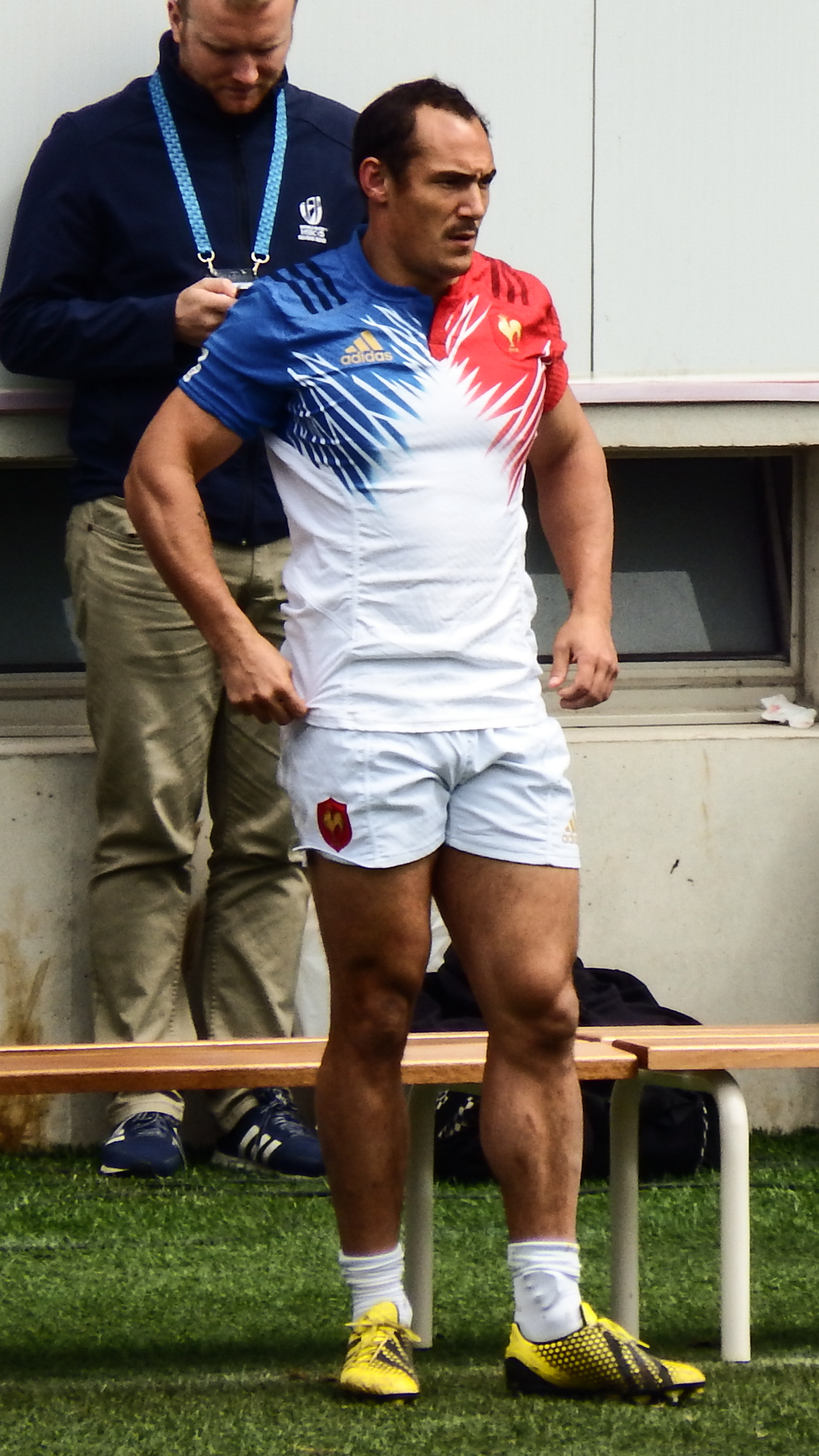
- Cler in 2016
- Born: 2 October 1983 (age 43)
- Height: 1.85 m (6 ft 1 in)
- Weight: 95 kg (209 lb; 14 st 13 lb)

Rugby union career
- Position(s): Forward (7s); Fullback, Wing, Centre, Fly-half
Senior career
Years	Team	Apps	(Points)
2005-2011	Mont-de-Marsan		
2011-2015	La Rochelle		
National sevens team
Years	Team		Comps
- France 7s

Damien Cler (born 2 October 1983) is a French rugby seven forward who competed at the 2016 Olympics.

Cler is married to Julie and has a son Louis. He was included to the national team in 2015.
