= Kyle Brown (rugby union, born 1987) =

South African rugby union player

- Full name: Kyle Gie Brown
- Born: 6 February 1987 (age 39) Cape Town, South Africa
- Height: 1.82 m (5 ft 11 1/2 in)
- Weight: 96 kg (212 lb; 15 st 2 lb)
- School: South African College Schools, Cape Town

Rugby union career
- Position: Flanker
Youth career
- 2006–2007: Boland Cavaliers
- 2008: Western Province
Amateur team(s)
Years	Team	Apps	(Points)
2008	UCT Ikey Tigers	7	(0)
- Correct as of 9 December 2014
International career
Years	Team	Apps	(Points)
2008–present	South Africa Sevens	327	(420)
- Correct as of 15 November 2018
Medal record
Men's rugby sevens
Representing South Africa
Olympic Games
Bronze medal – third place	2016 Rio de Janeiro	Team competition
Commonwealth Games
Gold medal – first place	2014 Glasgow	Team competition
World Games
Gold medal – first place	2013 Cali	Team competition
Bronze medal – third place	2009 Kaohsiung	Team competition

Kyle Gie Brown (born 6 February 1987) is a South African rugby union player, currently playing with the South African Sevens team. He was the captain of the South African Sevens team that won a bronze medal at the 2016 Summer Olympics.

== Career ==
=== Youth and Varsity Cup rugby ===
He played some youth rugby for Wellington-based side Boland Cavaliers at Under-19 level in 2006 and at Under-21 level in 2007. In 2008, he returned to Cape Town to play in the inaugural Varsity Cup competition, making seven appearances as his side the UCT Ikey Tigers reached the final of the competition, where they were beaten 16–10 by fellow Western Cape university Maties. He was also included in the Western Province U21 side that played in the 2008 Under-21 Provincial Championship.

=== South African Sevens ===
At the end of 2008, Brown was included in the South African Sevens squad for the 2008–09 IRB Sevens World Series. He made his debut at the 2008 Dubai Sevens and played every leg of the series, as South Africa won the series for the first time at their tenth attempt. He also played in the 2009 Rugby World Cup Sevens competition, helping South Africa to the quarter-finals, where they lost to Argentina. He also won a bronze medal with the side at the 2009 World Games in Kaohsiung, Republic of China (Taiwan).

He became a key member of the sevens side over the next few years, appearing in the majority of tournaments in IRB Sevens World Series, although he did miss most of the 2012–13 IRB Sevens World Series through injury. He returned in time for the 2013 Rugby World Cup Sevens, but the Blitzbokke once again lost in the quarter-finals of the competition, this time to Fiji. However, they made some amends by winning gold medals at 2013 World Games in Cali, Colombia shortly afterwards.

He played in seven further legs of the 2013–14 IRB Sevens World Series and then captained the squad that played at the 2014 Commonwealth Games in Glasgow, helping his side all the way to the final, where they got a 17–12 victory over a New Zealand that won the previous four tournaments.

=== 2016 Summer Olympics ===
Kyle Brown was named captain of a 12-man squad for the 2016 Summer Olympics in Rio de Janeiro. He was named in the starting line-up for their first match in Group B of the competition against Spain, with South Africa winning the match 24–0. He started their second match against France, scoring one of South Africa's four tries in a 26–0 victory, and dropped to the bench for their final match against Australia. Despite a 5–12 defeat in this match, South Africa still finished top of Pool B to set up a quarter final rematch against Australia. Brown was restored to the starting line-up for this match and scored one of South Africa's tries in a 22–5 victory. He started South Africa's semi-final match against Great Britain and scored South Africa's only points of a 5–7 defeat, which saw his side eliminated from gold medal contention. He also started their third-place play-off, helping his side to a 54–14 victory over Japan to secure a bronze medal in the Olympic Games.
