= Juan de Jongh =

South African rugby union player

- Full name: Juan Leon de Jongh
- Born: 15 April 1988 (age 38) Paarl, South Africa
- Height: 1.76 m (5 ft 9 1/2 in)
- Weight: 87 kg (192 lb; 13 st 10 lb)
- School: Huguenot High School, Wellington

Rugby union career
- Position: Centre
- Current team: Stormers / Western Province
Youth career
- 2006: Boland Cavaliers
- 2007: Western Province
Amateur team(s)
Years	Team	Apps	(Points)
2008	Maties	1	(0)
Senior career
Years	Team	Apps	(Points)
2009–2017	Western Province	59	(115)
2010–2017	Stormers	97	(75)
2017–2021	Wasps	64	(50)
2021–2023	Western Province	14	(5)
2021–2023	Stormers	3	(0)
- Correct as of 23 July 2022
International career
Years	Team	Apps	(Points)
2008, 2015–2017	South Africa Sevens		
2009–2016	South Africa (test)	19	(15)
2009–2012	South Africa (tour)	2	(5)
2014	Barbarians	2	(10)
2017	South Africa 'A'	2	(0)
- Correct as of 18 April 2018
Medal record
Men's rugby sevens
Representing South Africa
Olympic Games
Bronze medal – third place	2016 Rio de Janeiro	Team competition

Juan Leon de Jongh (born 15 April 1988) is a South African former professional rugby union footballer. He was one of the stars of Vodacom WP's ABSA Currie Cup campaign in 2009 and he made his debut against the Sharks. He became the first choice inside centre for the Stormers in the 2010 Super 14 season after the departure of stalwart and captain, Jean de Villiers. He won his first international cap against Wales on 5 June 2010, during this game he also scored his first international try with a scything break through the Welsh midfield, similar to that of his previous try against the Waratahs in the Super 14 semi-final.

De Jongh was a member of the South African Sevens team that won a bronze medal at the 2016 Summer Olympics. In May 2017 it was announced he would be joining Aviva Premiership side Wasps for the 2017/18 season.

== 2016 Summer Olympics ==
De Jongh was included in a 12-man squad for the 2016 Summer Olympics in Rio de Janeiro. He was named in the starting line-up for their first match in Group B of the competition against Spain, with South Africa winning the match 24–0.

== Super Rugby Statistics ==
As of 21 June 2015

Season	Team	Games	Starts	Sub	Mins	Tries	Cons	Pens	Drops	Points	Yel	Red
2010	Stormers	13	13	0	933	1	0	0	0	5	0	0
2011	Stormers	17	7	10	742	2	0	0	0	10	0	0
2012	Stormers	16	16	0	1280	3	0	0	0	15	0	0
2013	Stormers	11	11	0	864	3	0	0	0	15	0	0
2014	Stormers	12	11	1	895	3	0	0	0	15	0	0
2015	Stormers	15	15	0	1123	2	0	0	0	10	0	0
Total		84	73	11	5837	14	0	0	0	70	0	0
