= Terry Bouhraoua =

French rugby union player

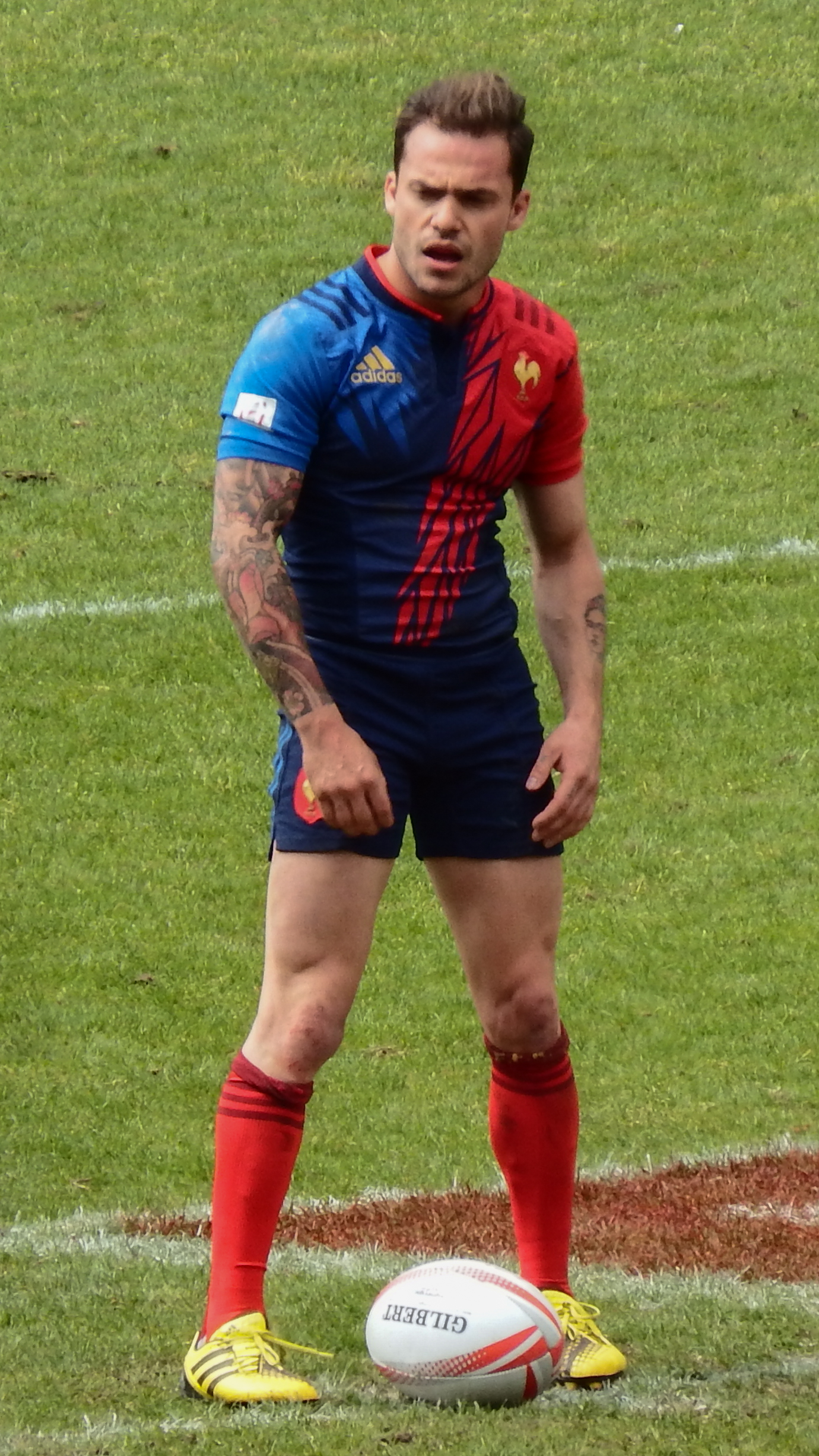
- Born: 29 August 1987 (age 39) Châteaudun, France
- Height: 1.69 m (5 ft 7 in)
- Weight: 59 kg (130 lb)

Rugby union career
- Position: Scrum-half
Amateur team(s)
Years	Team	Apps	(Points)
1994–1996	O.C. Châteaudun		
1996–2002	R.C. Bonneval		
2002–2003	US Ussel		
Senior career
Years	Team	Apps	(Points)
2004–2005	CA Brive	0	(0)
2005–2009	Stade Français	26	(0)
2009–2010	AS Béziers	21	(35)
2017–2018	Stade Français	7	(10)
National sevens team
Years	Team		Comps
2010–	France 7s		271 (1,492)

Terry Bouhraoua (born 29 August 1987) is a French rugby union and rugby union sevens player who plays for the France national rugby sevens team. His position is scrum-half.

Bouhraoua was born in Châteaudun, France. He began professional rugby in 2005 for Stade Français and left the French capital four years later for AS Béziers Hérault, which played in Fédérale 1 (third division).

== International ==
In 2010 he signed a contract with the French Rugby Federation (FFR) to play in French national rugby sevens team. Since 2014, he has been the captain of the team. Bouhraoua made his international debut in rugby sevens during the 2010 Dubai Sevens. He played the 2016 Olympic Games, ended by Japan in Cup quarter final (10–12). He was the top scorer of the competition with 43 points, one more than the South African Cecil Afrika, and top try scorer of his team with four tries.

== Awards ==
- Top try scorer in 2015 Dubai Sevens (8 tries)
- Top scorer in 2016 Olympic Games (43 points)
- Top try scorer in 2016 South Africa Sevens (10 tries)
