= Gustavo Albuquerque =

Brazilian rugby sevens player (born 1991)

- Full name: Gustavo Barreiros de Albuquerque
- Born: June 28, 1991 (age 35)
- Height: 1.72 m (5 ft 8 in)
- Weight: 85 kg (187 lb)

Rugby union career
National sevens team
Years	Team	Comps
- Brazil

Gustavo Barreiros de Albuquerque (born June 28, 1991) is a Brazilian rugby sevens player. He represented Brazil 7s at the 2016 Summer Olympics.
