= Kitione Taliga =

- Full name: Kitione Taliga Dawai
- Born: 21 April 1993 (age 33) Nadi, Fiji
- Height: 186 cm (6 ft 1 in)
- Weight: 87 kg (192 lb; 13 st 10 lb)
- School: Ratu Navula College

Rugby union career
- Position(s): Fly-half, Fullback
- Current team: Fijian Drua
Senior career
Years	Team	Apps	(Points)
2017–	Fijian Drua	4	(5)
- Correct as of 10 February 2022
National sevens team
Years	Team		Comps
2015–2016	Fiji		12
- Correct as of 10 February 2022
Medal record
Men's rugby sevens
Representing Fiji
Summer Olympics
Gold medal – first place	2016 Rio de Janeiro	Team competition

Kitione Taliga (born 21 April 1993) is a Fiji rugby union player. He is currently playing for the Fiji sevens team, Kitione Taliga was selected by Coach Ben Ryan in 2015 to represent Fiji National Sevens side at 2015–16 World Rugby Sevens Series and Taliga made his debut for Fiji 7s at the 2015 Dubai Sevens, he is known for his performance at the 2016 USA Sevens Final, when he came off the bench, ran the entire length of the field to score under the posts and also score another try from counter-attack, which marked a comeback against Australia national rugby sevens team.

Taliga hails from the village of Dratabu, Nadi and attended Ratu Navula Secondary School. He made a name for himself playing local 7's tournaments with the Wardens Rugby Club. It was here where he caught the attention of Ben Ryan and was drafted into the Fiji Sevens Team.

== Awards ==
- 2016 Canada Sevens – DHL Impact Player of the Tournament
- 2016 Singapore Sevens – DHL Impact Player of the Tournament
