= Marcos Poggi =

- Born: 31 August 1987 (age 39)
- Height: 1.82 m (5 ft 11 1/2 in)
- Weight: 86 kg (190 lb; 13 st 8 lb)

Rugby union career
National sevens team
| Years | Team | Comps |
- Spain

Marcos Poggi (born 31 August 1987) is a Spanish rugby sevens player. He was selected for Spain 7s's 2013 Rugby World Cup Sevens squad. In 2016, he was named in Spain 7s's rugby sevens team for the Rio Olympics. He was part of the team that won the 2016 Men's Rugby Sevens Final Olympic Qualification Tournament that was held in Monaco.
