= Biko Adema =

Kenyan rugby sevens player

- Born: September 1, 1987 (age 39) Mombasa, Kenya
- Height: 1.77 m (5 ft 10 in)
- Weight: 85 kg (187 lb)

Rugby union career
National sevens team
Years	Team	Comps
- Kenya

Biko Wolfgang Adema (born September 1, 1987) is a Kenyan rugby sevens player. He was selected for Kenya 7s to compete at the 2016 Summer Olympics in Brazil. He was a member of Kenya's squad for the 2013 Rugby World Cup Sevens.
