= Marcus Watson =

English rugby union player

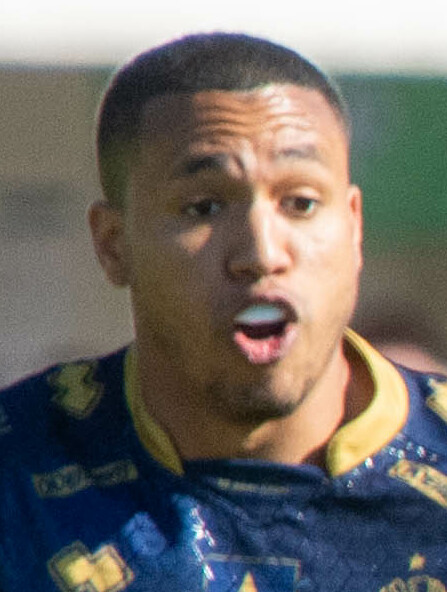
- Born: 27 June 1991 (age 35) Hillingdon, England
- Height: 1.78 m (5 ft 10 in)
- Weight: 86 kg (13 st 8 lb; 190 lb)
- School: St George's College, Weybridge
- Notable relative: Anthony Watson (brother)

Rugby union career
- Position(s): Wing, Fullback
Amateur team(s)
Years	Team	Apps	(Points)
- London Irish Amateur
Senior career
Years	Team	Apps	(Points)
2009–2011	London Irish	5	(0)
2011–2012	Saracens	0	(0)
2015–2017	Newcastle Falcons	33	(75)
2017–2022	Wasps	68	(100)
2022−2024	Benetton	16	(35)
- Correct as of 2 April 2023
International career
Years	Team	Apps	(Points)
2010	England U20	5	(15)
National sevens teams
Years	Team		Comps
2012–2015	England		35
2016	Great Britain		1
Medal record
Men's rugby sevens
Representing Great Britain
Olympic Games
Silver medal – second place	2016 Rio de Janeiro	Team competition

Marcus Watson (born 27 June 1991) is a retired English rugby union player who played at wing and fullback for Benetton in the United Rugby Championship.

Watson attended St George's College, Weybridge in Surrey, as a full-back.

== Club career ==
Watson started his career at London Irish in 2009, where he came through the club's academy. He only made six first team appearances before moving to Saracens in 2011.

Watson never made a competitive first team appearance for Saracens but did help them win the JP Morgan Premiership Sevens.

Watson transitioned back to 15-a-side when he signed with Newcastle Falcons after three years with England Sevens in February 2015. He was awarded the team's player of the month in November 2017. On 22 February 2017, Watson signed for Premiership rivals Wasps in the English Premiership ahead of the 2017-18 season. He played for Benetton in the United Rugby Championship from 2022 to 2023–24 United Rugby Championship season.

== International career ==
Watson played for England in the World Rugby Under 20 Championship in 2010. Marcus played for England national rugby sevens team from 2012–2015. He was selected for Team GB's Rugby 7s squad to play at the Rio Olympic Games 2016 in which GB won silver.
