= Gillies Kaka =

New Zealand rugby union player and Olympian

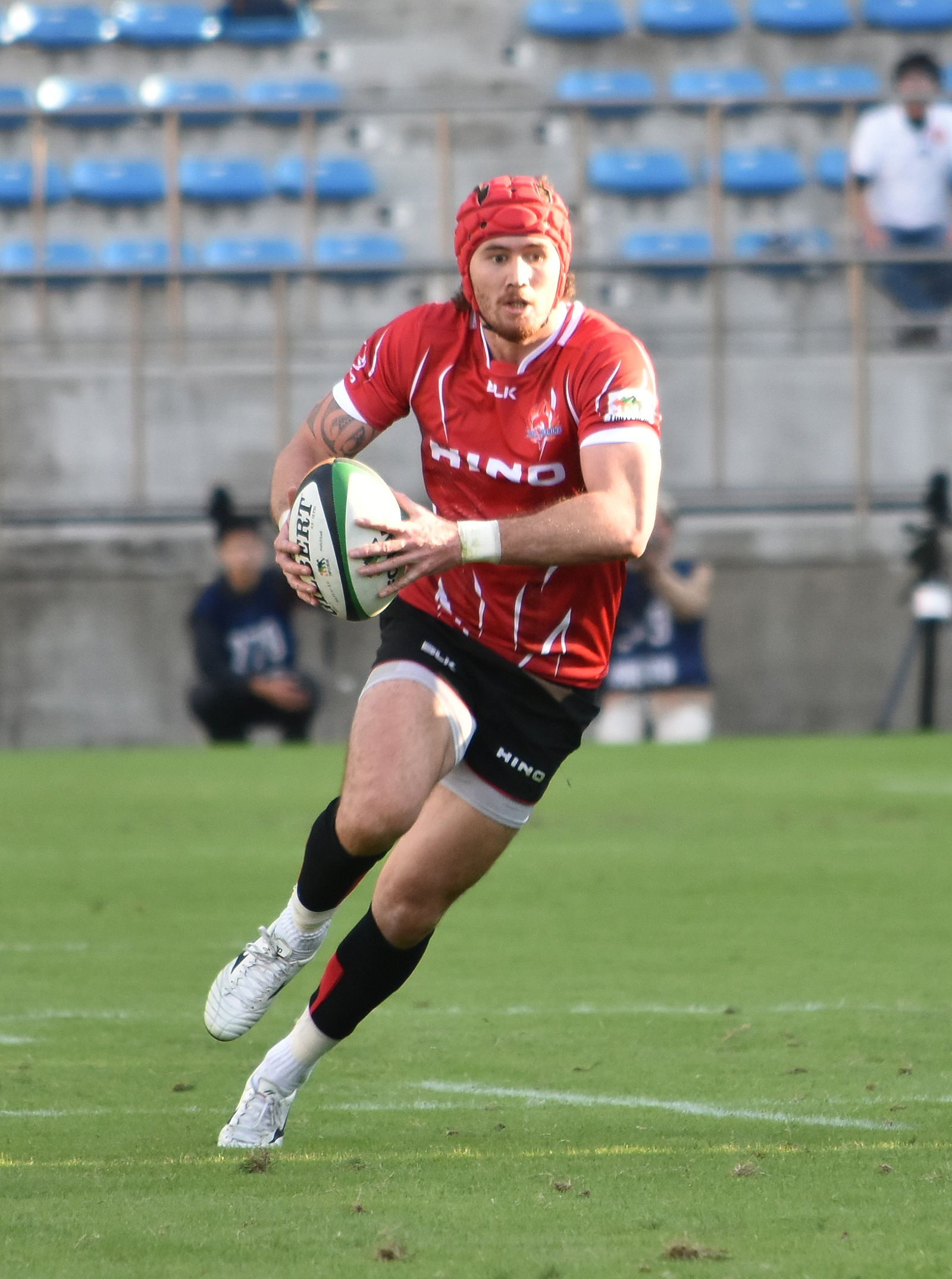
- Kaka in 2018
- Full name: Gillies Gene Kaka
- Born: 28 May 1990 (age 36) New Plymouth, New Zealand
- Height: 186 cm (6 ft 1 in)
- Weight: 90 kg (198 lb; 14 st 2 lb)
- School: New Plymouth Boys' High School

Rugby union career
- Position(s): Fullback, Wing
Senior career
Years	Team	Apps	(Points)
- El Salvador
2010–2013	Hawke's Bay	31	(50)
2017–	Hino Red Dolphins	52	(124)
- Correct as of 4 February 2021
National sevens team
Years	Team		Comps
2013–2016	New Zealand		33
- Correct as of 15 December 2018
Medal record
Men's rugby sevens
Representing New Zealand
Commonwealth Games
Silver medal – second place	2014 Glasgow	Team

Gillies Gene Kaka (born 28 May 1990 in New Zealand) is a New Zealand Olympian rugby union player for the Hino Red Dolphins.

== Career ==
Kaka plays for the New Zealand National Rugby Sevens team. He made his debut at the Wellington Sevens. Kaka has participated in the 2014 Commonwealth Games where New Zealand won silver. He was in the HSBC Dream Team alongside Tim Mikkelson. Kaka played for Hawke's Bay before becoming a full-time New Zealand National Rugby Sevens player. Of Māori descent, Kaka affiliates to Ngāti Kahungunu and Te Arawa.

Kaka was named in the New Zealand squad for the 2016 Summer Olympics. Kaka finished his sevens career with 33 competition appearances, 169 games, 65 tries and 807 points.
