= André Silva (rugby union, born 1988) =

- Born: March 22, 1988 (age 38)
- Height: 1.7 m (5 ft 7 in)
- Weight: 80 kg (180 lb; 12 st 8 lb)

Rugby union career
National sevens team
Years	Team	Comps
- Brazil

André Silva (born March 22, 1988) is a Brazilian rugby sevens player. He was named in Brazil 7s's sevens squad for the 2016 Summer Olympics. He also played at the 2015 Pan American Games for Brazil.
