= César Sempere =

Spain international rugby union player

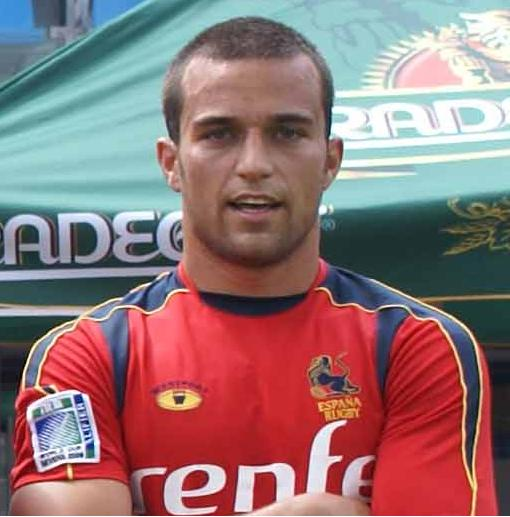
- Born: César Sempere i Padilla; 26 May 1984 (age 42) Villajoyosa, Spain
- Height: 1.82 m (6 ft 0 in))
- Weight: 86 kg (13 st 8 lb)

Rugby union career
- Position: Fullback / Wing / Fly-half / Centre
- Current team: El Salvador
Senior career
Years	Team	Apps	(Points)
2002–2004	CR La Vila		
2004–2006	CR El Salvador		
2006–2009	CRC Madrid Noroeste	52	(276)
2009–2010	Olympus Madrid	5	(20)
2010	Montpellier Hérault RC	2	(3)
2010–2011	Nottingham RFC	22	(23)
2011–2012	Northampton Saints	2	(5)
2012–2014	CR El Salvador	22	(23)
2016-2019	Tatami Rugby Club		
- Correct as of 14 May 2024
International career
Years	Team	Apps	(Points)
2004–2014	Spain	53	(172)
- Correct as of 14 May 2024
National sevens team
Years	Team		Comps
2012–2016	Spain 7s		13
- Correct as of 14 May 2024

César Sempere (born 26 May 1984, in Villajoyosa) is a Spanish retired rugby union player. He usually played fullback for the Spanish rugby union team.

== Professional career ==
The Spaniard has been capped 53 times by Spain playing fullback, wing, fly half and centre compiling an impressive tally of 31 international tries. After a trial with Leicester Tigers, much of his rugby was played in his home country, though Top 14 experience is also on Cesar's resume having spent time with Montpellier Hérault Rugby before his switch to Championship campaigners Nottingham RFC.
