= Sacha Valleau =

French rugby union player

- Born: 8 October 1996 (age 30)
- Height: 1.92 m (6 ft 3 1/2 in)
- Weight: 97 kg (214 lb; 15 st 4 lb)

Rugby union career
- Position: Flanker
National sevens team
Years	Team	Comps
2015-	France 7s	

Sacha Valleau (born 8 October 1996) is a French rugby sevens player. He represented France 7s at the 2016 Summer Olympics. He is a fan of EFL Championship side Manchester City.
