= Viliame Mata =

Fijian rugby union player

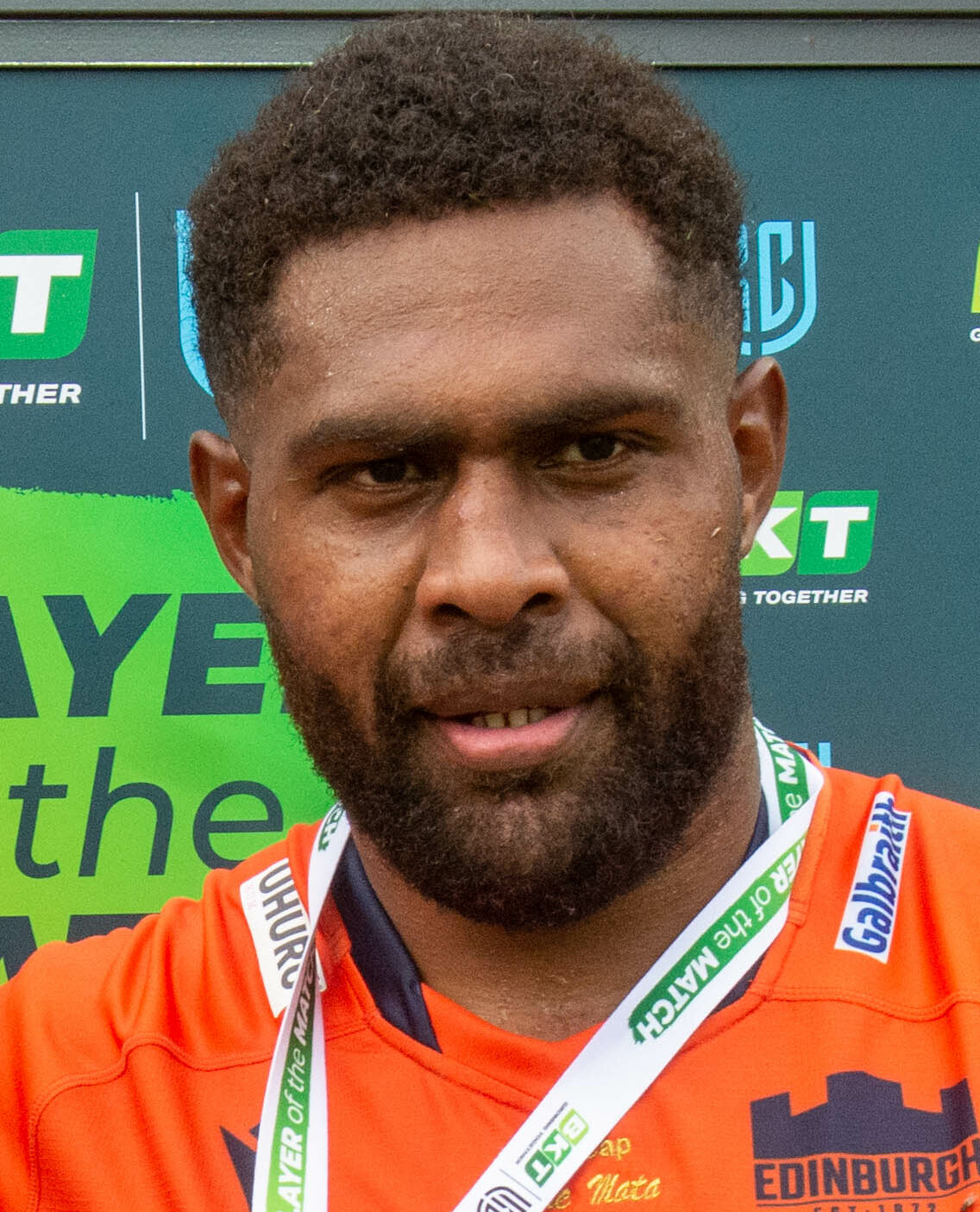
- Born: Viliame Sevaka Mata; 22 October 1991 (age 35) Nauluvatau, Nakelo, Tailevu, Fiji
- Height: 1.96 m (6 ft 5 in)
- Weight: 123 kg (271 lb)

Rugby union career
- Position(s): Flanker, Lock, Number 8
Senior career
Years	Team	Apps	(Points)
2016–2024	Edinburgh Rugby	136	(105)
2024–	Bristol Bears	17	(35)
- Correct as of 1 June 2025
International career
Years	Team	Apps	(Points)
2017–	Fiji	29	(30)
- Correct as of 27 June 2024
National sevens team
Years	Team		Comps
2013–2016	Fiji 7's		10 (60)
Medal record
Men's rugby sevens
Representing Fiji
Olympic Games
Gold medal – first place	2016 Rio de Janeiro	Team competition

Viliame Sevaka Mata (born 22 October 1991) also known as Bill Mata, is a Fijian rugby union player who currently plays for Bristol Bears in the Gallagher Premiership.

== Career ==
Mata was born and raised in Nauluvatau, a small village in Nakelo, Tailevu and was selected by Ben Ryan to represent the Fiji sevens team to the 2014 Wellington Sevens as a replacement for Pio Tuwai.

Mata is a professional rugby footballer who played for champion local 7s side Davetalevu. He studied at Suva Grammar School before moving to Ratu Kadavulevu School.

Mata made the final Fiji squad for the 2016 Summer Olympics where he won a gold medal for Fiji in rugby 7s. Has also represented the Flying Fijians at the 2019 and 2023 Rugby World Cup.

In July 2016, Mata signed for Pro12 side, Edinburgh for two-years and he joined the side after helping Fiji win Gold at the Olympics but his visa-expired a year later as he was not capped internationally for Fiji and visas for player not capped by Kolpak countries were only for a year, he had to return to Fiji and get capped by the Fiji 15's team. He made his test debut against Australia on 10 June, playing off the bench. He played three more tests for Fiji off the bench, which allowed him to lodge a visa application to extend his visa to Scotland. He returned to Edinburgh in September 2017 and became a regular starter for the team.

In December 2017, he signed an extension to stay at Edinburgh Rugby until 2020. At the end of the 2018-19 Pro14 season, Mata was named the Players’ Player of the Season.

In January 2024, Mata moved to England to sign for Bristol Bears in the Premiership Rugby competition for the 2024–25 season.
