= Jesse Parahi =

- Born: 29 July 1989 (age 37) Campsie, New South Wales, Australia
- Height: 1.89 m (6 ft 2 1/2 in)
- Weight: 104 kg (229 lb; 16 st 5 lb)

Rugby union career
- Position: Forward
Amateur team(s)
Years	Team	Apps	(Points)
- Avoca Beach Sharks
National sevens team
Years	Team		Comps
2010–present	Australia 7s		

Jesse Parahi (born 29 July 1989) is an Australian rugby union player. He plays rugby sevens for Australia 7s. He made his international debut at the 2010 Edinburgh Sevens.

In November 2015 Parahi briefly left the Australian sevens team to play for Wests Tigers in the NRL. After eight months in rugby league he decided to switch back to rugby sevens and rejoined the team for the 2016 Paris Sevens.

Parahi was named in Australia's sevens squad for the 2016 Summer Olympics.

Parahi is of New Zealand Māori descent, and affiliates with the Ngāti Kahungunu iwi (tribe).

Parahi and his wife Carlien run an occupational therapy program - Sense Rugby - created to help kids who usually find it difficult to be part of a sports team get involved in sport and physical activity. https://www.senseteamsports.com.au/senserugby
