= Jérémy Aicardi =

French rugby union player

- Born: 26 November 1988 (age 37)
- Height: 1.78 m (5 ft 10 in)
- Weight: 83 kg (183 lb)

Rugby union career
- Position(s): Wing (Rugby Union); Centre (sevens)
National sevens team
Years	Team	Comps
2013-	France	

Jérémy Aicardi (born 26 November 1988) is a French rugby sevens player. He was selected for the French sevens team for the 2016 Summer Olympics in Brazil.
