= Tom Cusack =

Australian rugby union player

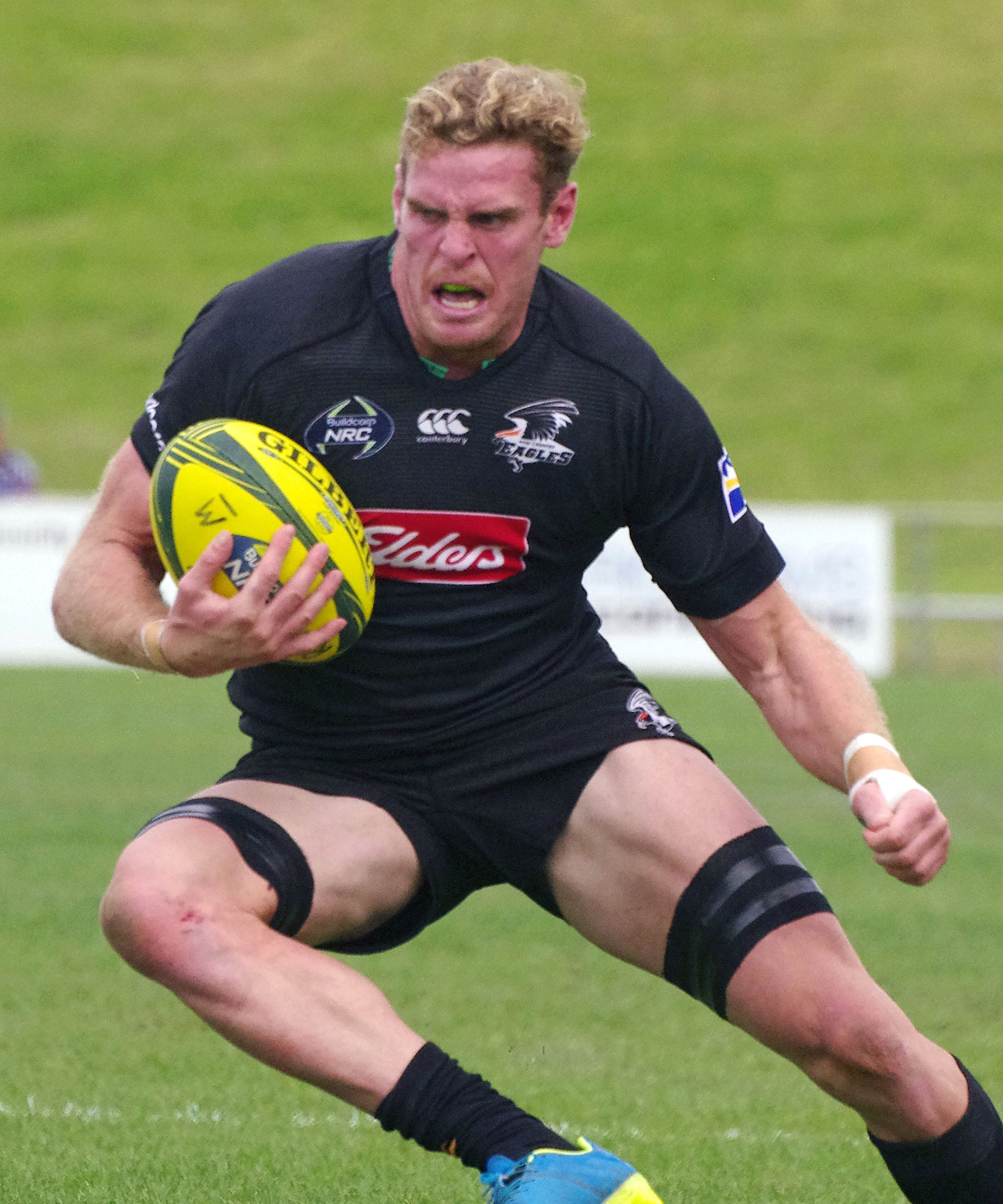
- Cusack for NSW Country in 2016
- Full name: Thomas Cusack
- Born: 1 March 1993 (age 33) Canberra, Australia
- Height: 191 cm (6 ft 3 in)
- Weight: 101 kg (223 lb)

Rugby union career
- Position: Flanker
Amateur team(s)
Years	Team	Apps	(Points)
- Canberra Royals
Senior career
Years	Team	Apps	(Points)
2014, 17	Canberra Vikings	1	(5)
2016	NSW Country	7	(6)
- Correct as of 15 August 2017
Super Rugby
Years	Team	Apps	(Points)
2017−pres.	Brumbies	2	(0)
- Correct as of 21 July 2017
International career
Years	Team	Apps	(Points)
2010	Australia Schoolboys		
2012	Australia U-20		
National sevens team
Years	Team		Comps
2013–2016	Australia 7s		18

Thomas Cusack (born 1 March 1993) is an Australian professional rugby union player who plays as a flanker for the Brumbies, as well as serving as vice-captain in Super Rugby. Additionally, he previously represented Australia in rugby sevens.

== Early life ==
Thomas Anthony Cusack was born in Canberra, ACT to an Australian father and Italian mother, and holds a dual Australian-Italian citizenship. He attended Marist College Canberra for his high school years, graduating in 2011. A former member of the ARU National Gold Squad, the ARU’s national Rugby development program for high school students, he showed a talent for rugby at an early age. Cusack was selected for Australia Schoolboys rugby team in 2010. He subsequently began studies toward a Sports Coaching and Exercise Science degree at University of Canberra before switching to a Bachelor of Business Management which he completed in 2018.

== Rugby career ==
Cusack joined the Canberra Royals for his rugby at club level. He was a member of the ARU's National Academy and played for Australia Under-20 at the 2012 Junior World Championships.

=== Australian Sevens ===
In February 2013, Cusack was brought into the Australian Sevens squad. He made his debut for Australia at the Wellington Sevens tournament and quickly established himself as an asset with ball in hand. Cusack represented Australia in the 2013 Rugby Sevens World Cup, scoring two tries, and was a squad member at the 2014 Commonwealth Games in Scotland. By December 2015, he had thirteen national caps in rugby sevens. He had a wrist ligament reconstruction surgery in early 2016, but recovered in time to compete for Australia at the 2016 Summer Olympics.

=== NRC ===
Cusack played for the Canberra Vikings in the inaugural National Rugby Championship (NRC) in 2014, scoring a try against the Rams in his only appearance for the season. In 2016 he turned out for NSW Country, playing in seven matches for the minor premiership-winning team, including the grand final loss to Perth in Tamworth. In 2017, Cusack was named Canberra Vikings received the NRC Players' Player award, which was voted for by both his teammates and opponents.

=== Super Rugby ===
Cusack made his Super Rugby debut for the Brumbies against the Melbourne Rebels in April 2017. In 2019, he signed on until the end of the 2021 season in a dual contract with the Australian Sevens. In the 2020 Super Rugby season, he was named vice-captain, supporting Allan Alaalatoa as Captain.
