= Felipe Silva (rugby union) =

- Born: Felipe Claro Santa’Ana Silva; February 28, 1986 (age 40) São Paulo, Brazil
- Height: 1.72 m (5 ft 8 in)
- Weight: 83 kg (183 lb)

Rugby union career
- Position: Scrum-half
Senior career
Years	Team	Apps	(Points)
- SPAC
International career
Years	Team	Apps	(Points)
2013-	Brazil		
National sevens team
Years	Team		Comps
- Brazil

Felipe Claro Santa’Ana Silva (born February 28, 1986) is a Brazilian rugby sevens player. He was named in Brazil 7s's sevens squad for the 2016 Summer Olympics. He was named in the Brazilian squad that played in a two-match test series against Germany in 2015.
