= Vincent Inigo =

French rugby union player

- Born: 10 February 1983 (age 43)
- Height: 1.73 m (5 ft 8 in)
- Weight: 80 kg (180 lb; 12 st 8 lb)

Rugby union career
- Position: Wing
National sevens team
Years	Team	Comps
2012-	France 7s	

Vincent Inigo (born 10 February 1983 in Agen) is a French rugby sevens player. He was selected to represent France 7s at the 2016 Summer Olympics in Brazil.

His brother Sébastien Inigo is also a rugby player.
