= Ángel López (rugby union) =

- Full name: Ángel López Vázquez
- Born: 16 January 1992 (age 34) Madrid
- Height: 1.72 m (5 ft 8 in)
- Weight: 78 kg (172 lb)

Rugby union career
- Position: Fly-half
International career
Years	Team	Apps	(Points)
2012–2017	Spain	4	(0)
National sevens team
Years	Team		Comps
2012-2017	Spain 7s		34

Ángel López Vázquez (born 16 January 1992 in Madrid) is a Spanish rugby sevens player. He competed for Spain 7s at the 2016 Summer Olympics. He also was part of the team that won the 2016 Men's Rugby Sevens Final Olympic Qualification Tournament.

He debuted for Spain in a match against Russia in 2012.

He has completed his studies in Medicine and currently works as an ophthalmologist at Hospital Ramón y Cajal in Madrid.
