= Kazuhiro Goya =

Japanese rugby union player

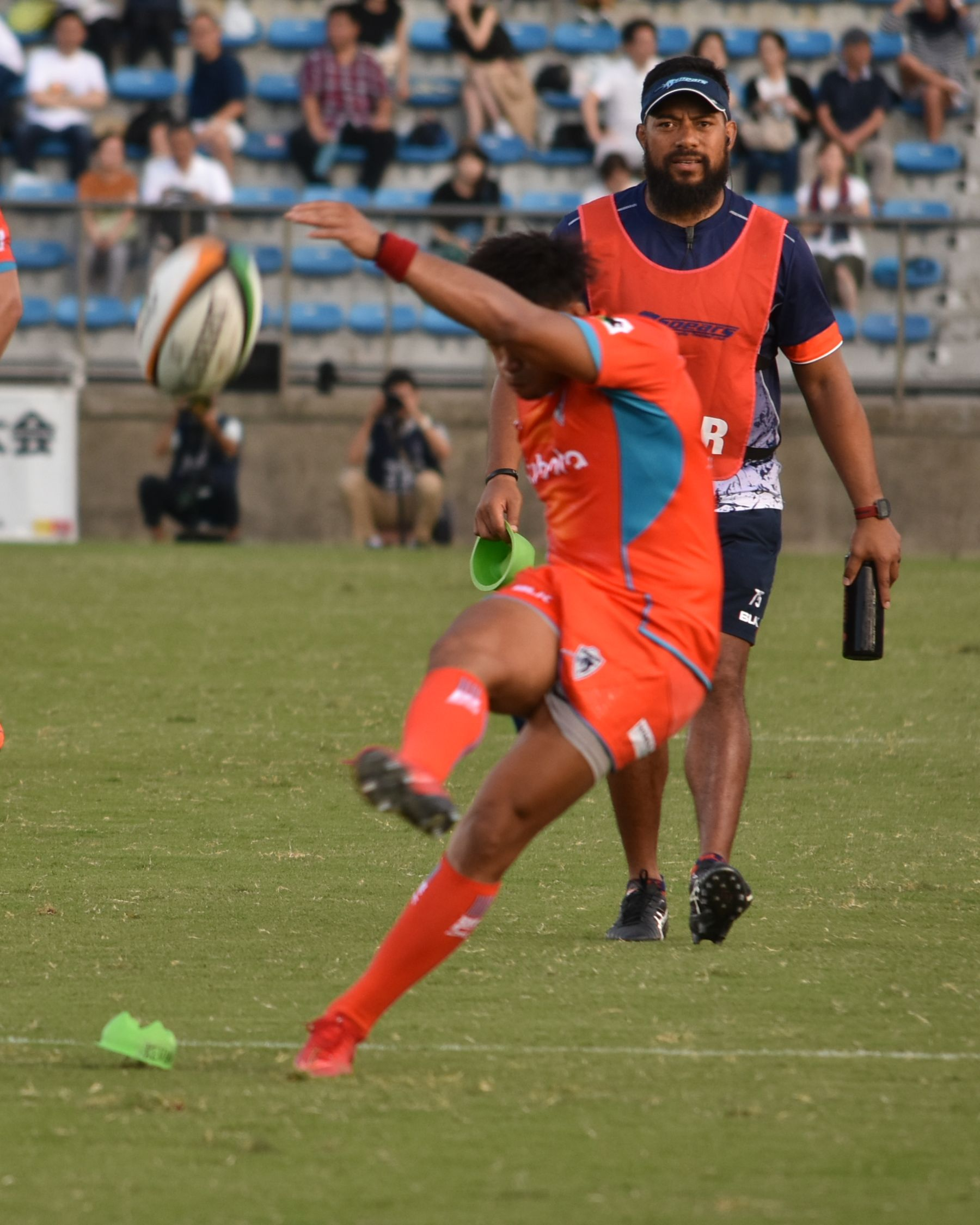
- Born: April 21, 1993 (age 33) Ōnojō, Fukuoka, Japan
- Height: 1.7 m (5 ft 7 in)
- Weight: 77 kg (170 lb; 12 st 2 lb)
- University: Ryutsu Keizai University

Rugby union career
- Position(s): Wing, Fullback
Senior career
Years	Team	Apps	(Points)
2016–2022	Kubota Spears	36	(113)
2022–2023	SC Pamiers		
- Correct as of 21 February 2021
International career
Years	Team	Apps	(Points)
2013	Japan U20	4	(15)
National sevens team
Years	Team		Comps
2014–2021	Japan Sevens		20

Kazuhiro Goya (合谷 和弘, Gōya Kazuhiro; born April 21, 1993) is a Japanese rugby sevens player. He competed at the 2016 Summer Olympics for Japan 7s. He played at the 2015 ARFU Men's Sevens Championships where Japan beat Hong Kong to qualify for the Olympics.
