= Vatemo Ravouvou =

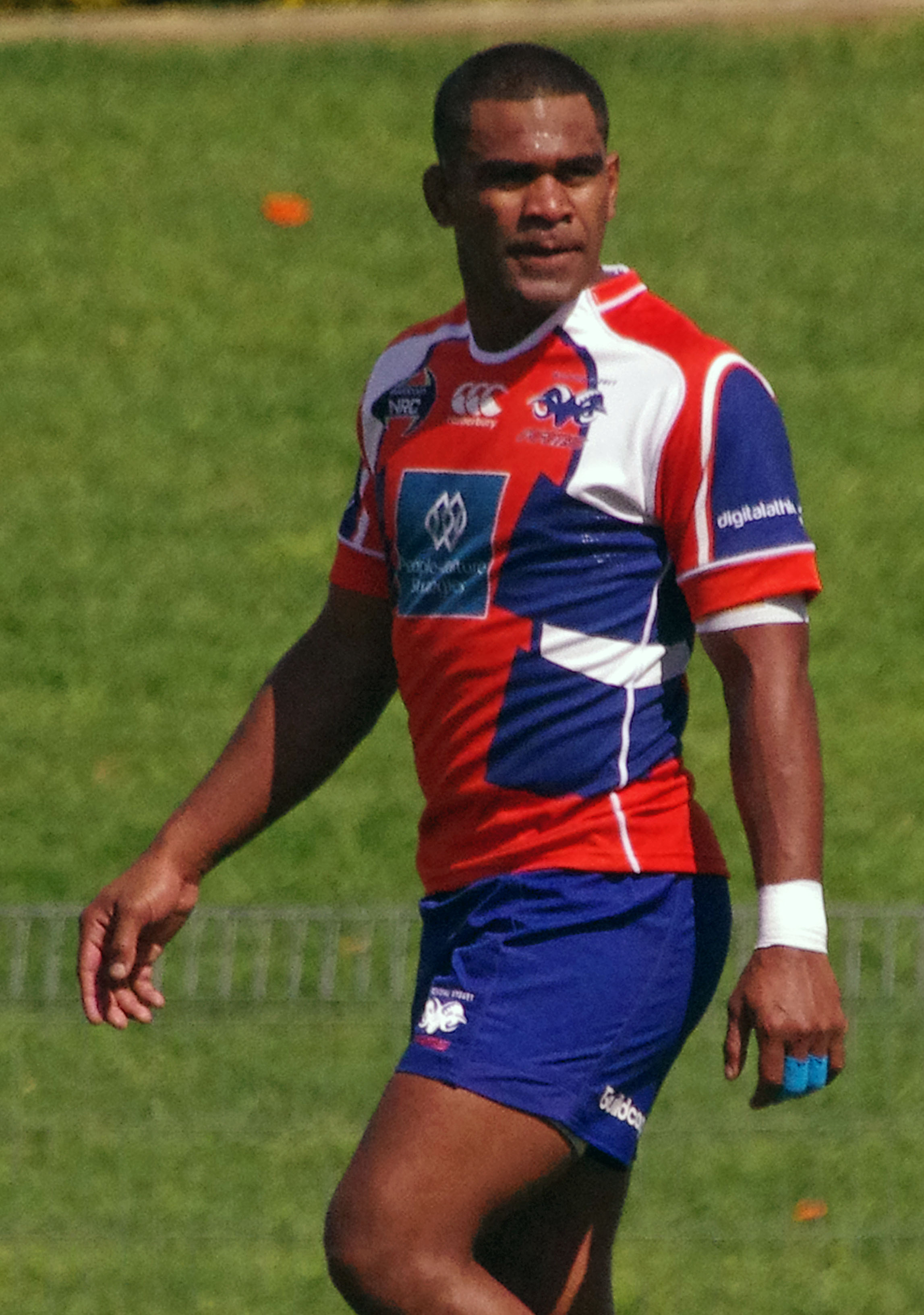
- Ravouvou playing for the RAMS, September 2016
- Born: 31 July 1990 (age 36)
- Height: 1.78 m (5 ft 10 in)
- Weight: 85 kg (13 st 5 lb; 187 lb)
- School: Ratu Navula College

Rugby union career
Senior career
Years	Team	Apps	(Points)
2016	Rams		
2019-	Utah Warriors	1	(0)
National sevens team
Years	Team		Comps
- Fiji
Medal record
Men's rugby sevens
Representing Fiji
Olympic Games
Gold medal – first place	2016 Rio de Janeiro	Team competition

Vatemo Ravouvou MOF (born 31 July 1990) is a Fiji rugby union player. He is currently playing for the Fiji sevens team.

In August 2016, he signed for Western Sydney Rams to play in the 2016 National Rugby Championship.

On April 27, 2018, it was announced by the Utah Warriors that he had signed for the remainder of the 2019 season and the entire 2020 season of Major League Rugby.
