= Phil Burgess =

British rugby sevens player

- Full name: Phillip Burgess
- Born: 1 July 1988 (age 38) Frimley, Surrey, England
- Height: 1.80 m (5 ft 11 in)
- Weight: 92 kg (203 lb)

Rugby union career
Senior career
Years	Team	Apps	(Points)
–	Cornish Pirates		
National sevens team
Years	Team		Comps
–	England 7s		
Medal record
Men's rugby sevens
Representing Great Britain
Olympic Games
Silver medal – second place	2016 Rio de Janeiro	Team competition

Phillip Burgess (born 1 July 1988) is a former professional English rugby sevens player who played for the England national rugby sevens team on the World Rugby Sevens Series. He played his club rugby for the Cornish Pirates.

He competed at the 2016 Summer Olympics in Rio de Janeiro, where he won a silver medal in the men's tournament with the British team.
