= List of flag bearers for Fiji at the Olympics =

Fiji at the Olympics
- IOC code: FIJ
- NOC: Fiji Association of Sports and National Olympic Committee
- Website: www.fijiolympiccommittee.com
- Medals: Gold 2 Silver 1 Bronze 1 Total 4

Summer appearances
- 1956; 1960; 1964; 1968; 1972; 1976; 1980; 1984; 1988; 1992; 1996; 2000; 2004; 2008; 2012; 2016; 2020; 2024

Winter appearances
- 1988; 1992; 1994; 1998; 2002; 2006–2026

This is a list of flag bearers who have represented Fiji at the Olympics.

Flag bearers carry the national flag of their country at the opening ceremony of the Olympic Games.

#	Event year	Season	National flag	Flag bearer	Sport
1	1956	Summer	Fiji	Mesulame Rakuro	Athletics
2	1960	Summer	Fiji	Mesulame Rakuro	Athletics
3	1968	Summer	Fiji	Viliame Liga	Athletics
4	1972	Summer	(Fiji)	Usaia Sotutu	Athletics
5	1976	Summer	(Fiji)	Miriama Tuisorisori-Chambault	Athletics
6	1984	Summer	(Fiji)	Viliame Takayawa	Judo
7	1988	Winter	(Fiji)	Rusiate Rogoyawa	Cross-country skiing
8	1988	Summer	(Fiji)	Viliame Takayawa	Judo
9	1992	Summer	(Fiji)	Carl Probert	Swimming
10	1994	Winter	(Fiji)	Rusiate Rogoyawa	Cross-country skiing
11	1996	Summer	(Fiji)	Jone Delai	Athletics
12	2000	Summer	(Fiji)	Tony Philp	Sailing
13	2002	Winter	(Fiji)	Laurence Thoms	Alpine skiing
14	2004	Summer	(Fiji)	Sisilia Rasokisoki	Judo
15	2008	Summer	(Fiji)	Makelesi Bulikiobo	Athletics
16	2012	Summer	(Fiji)	Josateki Naulu	Judo
17	2016	Summer	(Fiji)	Osea Kolinisau	Rugby
18	2020	Summer	(Fiji)	Rusila Nagasau	Rugby
18	2020	Summer	(Fiji)	Taichi Vakasama	Swimming
19	2024	Summer	(Fiji)	Raijieli Daveua	Rugby
19	2024	Summer	(Fiji)	Viliame Ratulu	Sailing

== See also ==
- Fiji at the Olympics
