= Fiji at the Olympics =

- IOC code: FIJ
- NOC: Fiji Association of Sports and National Olympic Committee
- Website: www.fasanoc.org.fj
- Medals Ranked 95th: Gold 2 Silver 1 Bronze 1 Total 4

Summer appearances
- 1956; 1960; 1964; 1968; 1972; 1976; 1980; 1984; 1988; 1992; 1996; 2000; 2004; 2008; 2012; 2016; 2020; 2024; 2028

Winter appearances
- 1988; 1992; 1994; 1998; 2002; 2006–2026

Fiji made its debut at the 1956 Summer Olympics. Since then the nation has competed at 16 Summer Olympic Games and 3 Winter Olympic Games. Its athletes have taken part in archery, athletics, boxing, football, judo, sailing, shooting, swimming, weightlifting and rugby sevens.

Fiji has won four Olympic medals, three in men's rugby sevens, and one in women's rugby sevens. Olympics rugby was first contested in 2016 and the Fiji men's team is the most successful of any country, winning gold in 2016 and 2020, and silver in 2024. The women's team won bronze in 2020.

== History ==
=== Qualifications ===
Prior to the introduction of rugby sevens, Fiji's national sport, at the 2016 Summer Olympics, only two athletes had qualified for the Olympic Games through reaching the required standards instead of receiving a wild card invitation. They are Makelesi Bulikiobo, who qualified for the women's 400 metre sprint at the 2008 Games in Beijing, and Leslie Copeland, who with a throw of 80.45 metres qualified for the men's javelin event at the 2012 Games in London.

=== Invitations ===
Fiji's Winter Olympians were Rusiate Rogoyawa in cross-country skiing (1988, 1994) and Laurence Thoms in alpine skiing (2002), both participating by invite.

=== Notable participants ===
Fiji has had two competitors appear at five separate Summer Olympic Games. Windsurfer Tony Philp competed in five consecutive Games from Los Angeles in 1984 (when he was just 15 years of age) to Sydney 2000, finishing 10th on two occasions. Swimmer Carl Probert matched the feat in Beijing 2008, having first appeared at the 1992 Summer Olympics at Barcelona.

=== Medalling ===
Fiji earned its first ever Olympic medal at the 2016 Summer Olympics in Rio de Janeiro, a gold in men's rugby sevens. The team broke out in a victory song that drew considerable online attention and Fiji declared a national holiday for the win.

At the 2020 Olympics the team successfully defended its title, while the women's team took a bronze medal. At the 2024 Olympics the men's team won the silver medal.

The world's first circulating seven-dollar banknotes have been issued in Fiji in 2017 to commemorate the victory of the Fiji men's rugby sevens team at the 2016 Rio de Janeiro Games, and in 2022 to celebrate the Fiji’s Rugby 7s men's gold and women's bronze medal at the 2020 Tokyo Games.

== Medal tables ==
=== Medals by Summer Games ===
Games	Athletes	Gold	Silver	Bronze	Total	Rank
(Australia) 1956 Melbourne	5	0	0	0	0	–
(Italy) 1960 Rome	2	0	0	0	0	–
(Japan) 1964 Tokyo	did not participate					
1968 Mexico City	1	0	0	0	0	–
(West Germany) 1972 Munich	2	0	0	0	0	–
(Canada) 1976 Montreal	2	0	0	0	0	–
(Soviet Union) 1980 Moscow	did not participate					
(United States) 1984 Los Angeles	15	0	0	0	0	–
(South Korea) 1988 Seoul	24	0	0	0	0	–
(Spain) 1992 Barcelona	19	0	0	0	0	–
(United States) 1996 Atlanta	17	0	0	0	0	–
(Australia) 2000 Sydney	7	0	0	0	0	–
(Greece) 2004 Athens	10	0	0	0	0	–
(China) 2008 Beijing	6	0	0	0	0	–
(United Kingdom) 2012 London	9	0	0	0	0	–
(Brazil) 2016 Rio de Janeiro	52	1	0	0	1	54
(Japan) 2020 Tokyo	30	1	0	1	2	59
(France) 2024 Paris	30	0	1	0	1	74
(United States) 2028 Los Angeles	future event					
(Australia) 2032 Brisbane	future event					
Total		2	1	1	4	95

=== Medals by Winter Games ===
Games	Athletes	Gold	Silver	Bronze	Total	Rank
(Canada) 1988 Calgary	1	0	0	0	0	–
(France) 1992 Albertville	did not participate					
(Norway) 1994 Lillehammer	1	0	0	0	0	–
(Japan) 1998 Nagano	did not participate					
(United States) 2002 Salt Lake City	1	0	0	0	0	–
2006–2026	did not participate					
(France) 2030 French Alps	future event					
(United States) 2034 Utah	future event					
Total		0	0	0	0	–

=== Medals by summer sport ===
Sport	Gold	Silver	Bronze	Total
Rugby sevens	2	1	1	4
Totals (1 entries)	2	1	1	4

== List of medalists ==
=== Summer sports ===
Medal	Name(s)	Games	Sport	Event
Gold	Apisai Domolailai; Jasa Veremalua; Jerry Tuwai; Josua Tuisova; Kitione Taliga; Leone Nakarawa; Masivesi Dakuwaqa; Osea Kolinisau; Samisoni Viriviri; Savenaca Rawaca; Vatemo Ravouvou; Viliame Mata; Semi Kunatani	2016 Rio de Janeiro	Rugby Sevens	Men's tournament
Gold	Josua Vakurunabili; Iosefo Masi; Jiuta Wainiqolo; Meli Derenalagi; Jerry Tuwai; Napolioni Bolaca; Sireli Maqala; Kalione Nasoko; Asaeli Tuivuaka; Vilimoni Botitu; Waisea Nacuqu; Aminiasi Tuimaba	2020 Tokyo	Rugby Sevens	Men's tournament
Bronze	Vasiti Solikoviti; Sesenieli Donu; Raijieli Daveua; Rusila Nagasau; Ana Maria Roqica; Reapi Ulunisau; Lavena Cavuru; Laisana Likuceva; Viniana Riwai; Alowesi Nakoci; Ana Naimasi; Roela Radiniyavuni; Lavenia Tinai	2020 Tokyo	Rugby Sevens	Women's tournament
Silver	Joji Nasova; Joseva Talacolo; Jerry Matana; Sevuloni Mocenacagi Iosefo Masi; Ponepati Loganimasi; Terio Tamani; Waisea Nacuqu; Jerry Tuwai; Iowane Teba; Kaminieli Rasaku; Selestino Ravutaumada; Josaia Raisuqe; Filipe Sauturaga	2024 Paris	Rugby Sevens	Men's tournament

==== Multiple medalists ====
Athlete	Sex	Sport	Years	Games	Gold	Silver	Bronze	Total
Jerry Tuwai	M	Rugby sevens	2016–2024	Summer	2	1	0	3
Iosefo Masi	M	Rugby sevens	2020–2024	Summer	1	1	0	2
Waisea Nacuqu	M	Rugby sevens	2020–2024	Summer	1	1	0	2

== See also ==
- List of flag bearers for Fiji at the Olympics
- Tropical nations at the Winter Olympics
- Fiji at the Paralympics
