= Fiji at the 2020 Summer Olympics =

- IOC code: FIJ
- NOC: Fiji Association of Sports and National Olympic Committee
- Website: www.fasanoc.org.fj

in Tokyo July 23, 2021 – August 8, 2021
- Competitors: 30 in 6 sports
- Flag bearers (opening): Rusila Nagasau; Taichi Vakasama
- Flag bearer (closing): Rusila Nagasau
- Medals Ranked 59th: Gold 1 Silver 0 Bronze 1 Total 2

Summer Olympics appearances (overview)
- 1956; 1960; 1964; 1968; 1972; 1976; 1980; 1984; 1988; 1992; 1996; 2000; 2004; 2008; 2012; 2016; 2020; 2024

Fiji competed at the 2020 Summer Olympics in Tokyo. Originally scheduled to take place from 24 July to 9 August 2020, the Games were postponed to 23 July to 8 August 2021, because of the COVID-19 pandemic. This was Fiji's Tokyo debut after it failed to register any athletes at the 1964 Summer Olympics, also held in Tokyo. Since the nation's debut in 1956, Fijian athletes have taken part in every edition of the Summer Olympic Games, except for two occasions. Fiji failed to register any athletes at the 1964 Summer Olympics in Tokyo, and joined the American-led boycott when Moscow hosted the 1980 Summer Olympics.

== Medalists ==
Medal	Name	Sport	Event	Date
Gold	Fiji national rugby sevens team: Josua Vakurunabili; Iosefo Masi; Kalione Nasoko; Jiuta Wainiqolo; Asaeli Tuivuaka; Meli Derenalagi; Vilimoni Botitu; Waisea Nacuqu; Jerry Tuwai; Semi Radradra; Aminiasi Tuimaba; Napolioni Bolaca; Sireli Maqala	Rugby sevens	Men's tournament	July 28
Bronze	Fiji women's national rugby sevens team: Lavena Cavuru; Raijieli Daveau; Sesenieli Donu; Laisana Likuceva; Rusila Nagasau; Ana Naimasi; Alowesi Nakoci; Roela Radiniyavuni; Viniana Riwai; Tokasa Seniyasi; Vasiti Solikoviti; Reapi Uluinasau	Rugby sevens	Women's tournament	July 31

== Competitors ==
The following is the list of number of competitors in the Games.

Sport	Men	Women	Total
Athletics	1	0	1
Judo	1	0	1
Rugby sevens	12	12	24
Sailing	0	1	1
Swimming	1	1	2
Table tennis	0	1	1
Total	15	15	30

== Athletics ==
Fiji received a universality slot from the World Athletics to send a male track and field athlete to the Olympics.

Key

- Note–Ranks given for track events are within the athlete's heat only
- Q = Qualified for the next round
- q = Qualified for the next round as a fastest loser or, in field events, by position without achieving the qualifying target
- NR = National record
- N/A = Round not applicable for the event
- Bye = Athlete not required to compete in round

Track & road events

Athlete	Event	Heat		Quarterfinal		Semifinal		Final	
Athlete	Event	Result	Rank	Result	Rank	Result	Rank	Result	Rank
Banuve Tabakaucoro	Men's 100 m	10.59 PB	=3 Q	10.70	8	Did not advance			

== Judo ==
Fiji entered one male judoka into the Olympic tournament based on the International Judo Federation Olympics Individual Ranking.

Athlete	Event	Round of 32	Round of 16	Quarterfinals	Semifinals	Repechage	Final / BM	
Athlete	Event	Opposition Result	Opposition Result	Opposition Result	Opposition Result	Opposition Result	Opposition Result	Rank
Tevita Takayawa	Men's −100 kg	Kukolj (SRB); L 00–01	Did not advance					

== Rugby sevens ==
Summary

Team	Event	Group stage				Quarterfinal	Semifinal	Final / BM	
Team	Event	Opposition Score	Opposition Score	Opposition Score	Rank	Opposition Score	Opposition Score	Opposition Score	Rank
Fiji men's	Men's tournament	Japan; W 24–19	Canada; W 28–14	Great Britain; W 33–7	1 Q	Australia; W 19–0	Argentina; W 26–14	New Zealand; W 27–12	1st place, gold medalist(s)
Fiji women's	Women's tournament	France; L 5–12	Canada; W 26–12	Brazil; W 41–5	2 Q	Australia; W 14–12	New Zealand; L 17–22	Great Britain; W 21–12	3rd place, bronze medalist(s)

=== Men's tournament ===
The Fiji national rugby sevens team qualified for the Olympics by advancing to the quarterfinals in the 2019 London Sevens, securing a top four spot in the 2018–19 World Rugby Sevens Series.

Team roster

Fiji's 12-man squad plus one alternate was named on 6 July 2021.

Head coach: Gareth Baber

No.	Pos.	Player	Date of birth (age)	Events	Points
1	FW	Josua Vakurunabili	10 June 1992 (aged 29)	25	235
2	FW	Iosefo Masi	9 May 1998 (aged 23)	0	0
3	FW	Kalione Nasoko	2 December 1990 (aged 30)	26	319
4	FW	Jiuta Wainiqolo	10 March 1999 (aged 22)	0	0
5	FW	Asaeli Tuivuaka	22 December 1995 (aged 25)	8	55
6	FW	Meli Derenalagi	26 November 1998 (aged 22)	16	110
7	BK	Vilimoni Botitu	15 June 1998 (aged 23)	16	265
8	BK	Waisea Nacuqu	24 May 1993 (aged 28)	34	661
9	BK	Jerry Tuwai (c)	23 March 1989 (aged 32)	54	674
10	BK	Semi Radradra	13 June 1992 (aged 29)	4	49
11	BK	Aminiasi Tuimaba	26 March 1995 (aged 26)	15	332
12	BK	Napolioni Bolaca	20 October 1996 (aged 24)	8	205
13	BK	Sireli Maqala	20 March 2000 (aged 21)	0	0

Group play

Pos	Team	Pld	W	D	L	PF	PA	PD	Pts	Qualification
1	Fiji	3	3	0	0	85	40	+45	9	Quarter-finals
2	Great Britain	3	2	0	1	65	33	+32	7	Quarter-finals
3	Canada	3	1	0	2	50	64	−14	5	Quarter-finals
4	Japan (H)	3	0	0	3	31	94	−63	3	

Source: Tokyo 2020 and World Rugby
Rules for classification: 1) Points; 2) Head-to-head result; 3) Point difference; 4) Points scored.
(H) Hosts

26 July 2021
9:00

Fiji	24–19	Japan
Try: Wainiqolo 1' c Masi 4' m Nacuqu (2) 10' c, 11' m Con: Bolaca (1/2) 1'; Nacuqu (1/1) 10'; Nasoko (0/1)	(Tokyo 2020)	Try: Matsui 2' c Tuqiri 7' c Soejima 8' m Con: Fujita (2/3) 3', 7'

Tokyo Stadium, Tokyo
Attendance: 0
Referee: Damon Murphy (Australia)

26 July 2021
17:00

Fiji	28–14	Canada
Try: Bolaca 1' c Wainiqolo 4' c Tuimaba 11' c Tuivuaka 14' c Con: Bolaca (2/2) 2', 4'; Nacuqu (2/2) 12', 14'	(Tokyo 2020)	Try: Hirayama 7' c Douglas 12' c Con: Hirayama (2/2) 7', 13'

Tokyo Stadium, Tokyo
Attendance: 0
Referee: Jordan Way (Australia)

27 July 2021
9:30

Fiji	33–7	Great Britain
Try: Tuivuaka (2) 2' m, 8' c Maqala 3' c Wainiqolo 7' c Tuimaba 14' c Con: Bolaca (3/4) 4', 7', 8'; Nasoko (1/1) 14'	(Tokyo 2020)	Try: Harris 10' c Con: Bibby (1/1) 10'

Tokyo Stadium, Tokyo
Attendance: 0
Referee: James Doleman (New Zealand)

Quarterfinal

27 July 2021
19:00

Fiji	19–0	Australia
Try: Tuwai (2) 3' c, 11' c Tuimaba 12' m Con: Bolaca (1/1); Botitu (1/2) 11'	(Tokyo 2020)

Tokyo Stadium, Tokyo
Attendance: 0
Referee: Craig Evans (Wales)

Semifinal

28 July 2021
11:30

Argentina	14–26	Fiji
Try: Moneta 6' c Mendy 7' c Con: Mare (2/2) 6', 7'	(Tokyo 2020)	Try: Maqala 2' m Derenalagi 4' c Wainiqolo 8' c Radradra 11' c Con: Bolaca (1/2) 4'; Tuwai (1/1) 9'; Botitu (1/1) 11'

Tokyo Stadium, Tokyo
Attendance: 0
Referee: James Doleman (New Zealand)

Gold medal match

28 July 2021
18:00

(silver) New Zealand	12–27	Fiji (gold)
Try: Curry 3' m Molia 8' c Con: Knewstubb (1/2) 8'	(Tokyo 2020)	Try: Derenalagi 1' m Maqala 3' c Wainiqolo 4' c Tuivuaka 11' m Con: Bolaca (2/3) 3', 5'; Nacuqu (0/1); Pen: Nacuqu (1/1) 14'

Tokyo Stadium, Tokyo
Attendance: 0
Referee: Damon Murphy (Australia)

=== Women's tournament ===
The Fiji women's national rugby sevens team qualified for the Olympics by winning the gold medal and securing an outright berth at the 2019 Oceania Women's Sevens Championships in Suva.

Team roster

Fiji's squad of 12 players was named on 6 July 2021. Also Lavenia Tinai, Ana Maria Roqica, and Rejieli Uluinayau were initially named as travelling reserves. However, Tinai and Roqica were added to the squad to replace the injured Tokasa Seniyasi and Uluinayau.

Head coach: Saiasi Fuli

- Lavena Cavuru
- Raijieli Daveua
- Sesenieli Donu
- Laisana Likuceva
- Rusila Nagasau (c)
- Ana Naimasi
- Alowesi Nakoci
- Roela Radiniyavuni
- Viniana Riwai
- Ana Maria Roqica
- Vasiti Solikoviti
- Lavenia Tinai
- Reapi Ulunisau

Group play

Pos	Team	Pld	W	D	L	PF	PA	PD	Pts	Qualification
1	France	3	3	0	0	83	10	+73	9	Quarter-finals
2	Fiji	3	2	0	1	72	29	+43	7	Quarter-finals
3	Canada	3	1	0	2	45	57	−12	5	
4	Brazil	3	0	0	3	10	114	−104	3	

Source: Tokyo 2020 and World Rugby
Rules for classification: 1) Points; 2) Head-to-head result; 3) Point difference; 4) Points scored.

29 July 2021
9:00

France	12–5	Fiji
Try: Horta 7' c Okemba 9' m Con: Drouin (1/2) 7'	(Tokyo 2020)	Try: Riwai 3' m

Tokyo Stadium, Tokyo

29 July 2021
16:30

Canada	12–26	Fiji
Try: Landry 7' c Moleschi 13' m Con: Landry (1/1) 7'	(Tokyo 2020)	Try: Ulunisau (2) 1' c, 8' m Naimasi 3' c Riwai 5' c Con: Riwai (3/4) 1', 4', 6'

Tokyo Stadium, Tokyo

30 July 2021
9:00

Fiji	41–5	Brazil
Try: Nakoci 4' c Ulunisau (4) 5' c, 7' m, 10' m, 12' m Naimasi 8' m Likuceva 14' c Con: Cavuru (2/4) 5', 5'; Riwai (1/3) 14'	(Tokyo 2020)	Try: Silva 2' m Con: Kochhann (0/1)

Tokyo Stadium, Tokyo

Quarterfinal

30 July 2021
18:30 (Note: Matches were delayed by 30 minutes due to lightning in the area)

Fiji	14–12	Australia
Try: Nakoci 1' c Naimasi 3' c Con: Riwai (2/2) 1', 3'	(Tokyo 2020)	Try: Nathan 6' m Caslick 13' c Con: Williams (0/1); Hinds (1/1) 13'

Tokyo Stadium, Tokyo

Semifinal

31 July 2021
11:00

New Zealand	22–17 (a.e.t.)	Fiji
Try: Broughton (2) 2' m, 16' m Woodman 10' c Fluhler 14' m Con: Nathan-Wong (1/3) 11'	(Tokyo 2020)	Try: Solikoviti 4' c, 9' m Ulunisau 14+' m Con: Riwai (1/3) 4'

Tokyo Stadium, Tokyo

Bronze medal match

31 July 2021
17:30

Fiji	21–12	Great Britain
Try: Nakoci 1' c, 6' c Ulunisau 10' c Con: Riwai (3/3) 1', 6', 10'	(Tokyo 2020)	Try: Jones 9' m, 12' c Con: Aitchison (0/1); Hunt (1/1) 12'

Tokyo Stadium, Tokyo

== Sailing ==
Fijian sailors qualified one boat in each of the following classes through the class-associated World Championships, and the continental regattas, marking the country's recurrence to the sport for the first time in two decades.

Athlete	Event	Race											Net points	Final rank
Athlete	Event	1	2	3	4	5	6	7	8	9	10	M*	Net points	Final rank
Sophia Morgan	Women's Laser Radial	~~43~~	40	41	35	42	43	36	41	42	36	EL	356	42

M = Medal race; EL = Eliminated – did not advance into the medal race

== Swimming ==
Fiji qualified two swimmers in two events.

Athlete	Event	Heat		Semifinal		Final	
Athlete	Event	Time	Rank	Time	Rank	Time	Rank
Taichi Vakasama	Men's 200 m breaststroke	2:17.35	35	Did not advance			
Cheyenne Rova	Women's 50 m freestyle	27.11	50	Did not advance			

== Table tennis ==
Fiji entered one athlete into the table tennis competition at the Games. With the cancellation of the 2021 Oceania Qualification Tournament, Rio 2016 Olympian Sally Yee accepted an invitation to compete in the women's singles for the second time, as the highest-ranked table tennis player vying for qualification from Oceania in the ITTF World Olympic Rankings of May 1, 2021.

Athlete	Event	Preliminary	Round 1	Round 2	Round 3	Round of 16	Quarterfinals	Semifinals	Final / BM	
Athlete	Event	Opposition Result	Opposition Result	Opposition Result	Opposition Result	Opposition Result	Opposition Result	Opposition Result	Opposition Result	Rank
Sally Yee	Women's singles	Edghill (GUY); L 1–4	Did not advance							
