= Fiji at the 2016 Summer Olympics =

- IOC code: FIJ
- NOC: Fiji Association of Sports and National Olympic Committee
- Website: www.fasanoc.org.fj

in Rio de Janeiro
- Competitors: 54 in 10 sports
- Flag bearer: Osea Kolinisau
- Medals Ranked 54th: Gold 1 Silver 0 Bronze 0 Total 1

Summer Olympics appearances (overview)
- 1956; 1960; 1964; 1968; 1972; 1976; 1980; 1984; 1988; 1992; 1996; 2000; 2004; 2008; 2012; 2016; 2020; 2024; 2028

Fiji competed at the 2016 Summer Olympics in Rio de Janeiro, Brazil, from 5 to 21 August 2016. Since the nation's debut in 1956, Fijian athletes had taken part in every edition of the Summer Olympic Games, except for two occasions. Fiji failed to register any athletes at the 1964 Summer Olympics in Tokyo, and joined the American-led boycott when Moscow hosted the 1980 Summer Olympics.

Fiji Association of Sports and National Olympic Committee sent the nation's largest delegation to the Games, due to the attendance of the men's football and rugby sevens teams. A total of 54 athletes, 37 men and 17 women, and 35 officials were registered to the Fijian squad across ten different sports. There was only a single competitor in archery, boxing, judo, shooting, and table tennis, the country's sporting debut apart from the rugby sevens.

The Fijian team featured a number of returning Olympians, including archer Rob Elder, javelin thrower Leslie Copeland, swimmer Matelita Buadromo (women's 200 m freestyle), weightlifter Manueli Tulo (men's 56 kg), and judoka Josateki Naulu (men's 81 kg). 53-year-old trap shooter Glenn Kable, who had competed in every edition since 2004, was the oldest and most experienced member of the team, with 17-year-old table tennis player Sally Yee rounding out the field as the youngest member. Rugby sevens team captain Osea Kolinisau was selected as Fiji's flag bearer for the opening ceremony.

Fiji earned its first ever Olympic medal at these Games, with a gold from the men's rugby sevens team (led by Kolinisau).

== Medalists ==
Medal	Name	Sport	Event	Date
Gold	Fiji national rugby sevens team: Jasa Veremalua; Kitione Taliga; Semi Kunatani; Leone Nakarawa; Osea Kolinisau; Jerry Tuwai; Samisoni Viriviri; Apisai Domolailai; Josua Tuisova; Viliame Mata; Vatemo Ravouvou; Savenaca Rawaca; Masivesi Dakuwaqa	Rugby sevens	Men's tournament	11 August

== Archery ==
One Fijian archer qualified for the men's individual recurve at the Olympics with a top two finish at the Oceania Qualification Tournament in Nuku'alofa.

Three-time Olympian Rob Elder scored a personal best of 635 during the qualification round to obtain a fifty-sixth position, before he was beaten three straight set by world no. 9 archer Wei Chun-heng of Chinese Taipei in his opening match.

Athlete	Event	Ranking round		Round of 64	Round of 32	Round of 16	Quarterfinals	Semifinals	Final / BM	
Athlete	Event	Score	Seed	Opposition Score	Opposition Score	Opposition Score	Opposition Score	Opposition Score	Opposition Score	Rank
Rob Elder	Men's individual	635	56	Wei C-h (TPE); L 0–6	Did not advance					

== Athletics ==
Fiji received two universality places from IAAF to compete in the Olympics. These places were awarded to London 2012 javelin thrower and 2015 Pacific Games gold medalist Leslie Copeland, and sprinter Sisilia Seavula in the women's 100 metres.

Seavula was among the fastest sprinters to progress beyond the prelims, but she finished eighth in the heats, resulting to her elimination. Meanwhile, Copeland threw a best of 76.04 m to obtain the thirty-second position in the qualifying round of the men's javelin throw, unable to improve upon his thirteenth-place feat four years earlier in London.

Key

- Note–Ranks given for track events are within the athlete's heat only
- Q = Qualified for the next round
- q = Qualified for the next round as a fastest loser or, in field events, by position without achieving the qualifying target
- NR = National record
- N/A = Round not applicable for the event
- Bye = Athlete not required to compete in round
- NM = No mark

Track & road events

Athlete	Event	Heat		Quarterfinal		Semifinal		Final	
Athlete	Event	Result	Rank	Result	Rank	Result	Rank	Result	Rank
Sisilia Seavula	Women's 100 m	12.34	2 Q	12.48	8	Did not advance			

Field events

Athlete	Event	Qualification		Final	
Athlete	Event	Distance	Position	Distance	Position
Leslie Copeland	Men's javelin throw	76.04	32	Did not advance	

== Boxing ==
Fiji received an invitation from the Tripartite Commission to send a male boxer competing in the welterweight division to the Games, signifying the nation's return to the sport for the first time since 1988. 2015 Pacific Games silver medalist Winston Hill lost his opening round bout to Armenia's Vladimir Margaryan through a unanimous decision, with the judges scored 3–0, in favor of the latter boxer.

Athlete	Event	Round of 32	Round of 16	Quarterfinals	Semifinals	Final	
Athlete	Event	Opposition Result	Opposition Result	Opposition Result	Opposition Result	Opposition Result	Rank
Winston Hill	Men's welterweight	Margaryan (ARM); L 0–3	Did not advance				

== Football ==
=== Men's tournament ===
Fiji men's football team qualified for the Olympics by winning the Olympic qualifying final at the 2015 Pacific Games Football Tournament in Papua New Guinea.

Team roster

On 8 July, the Fiji Football Association announced a 24-man preliminary squad for the men's football tournament of the 2016 Summer Olympics. On 16 July, the final 18-man squad was officially announced. However, Kolinio Sivoki and Sakaraia Naisua were axed from the squad due to disciplinary reasons and Joseph Turagabeci joined the squad as a replacement.

Head coach: (Australia) Frank Farina

No.	Pos.	Player	Date of birth (age)	Caps	Goals	2016 club
1	GK	Simione Tamanisau*	5 June 1982 (aged 34)	0	0	(Fiji Football Association) Rewa
2	DF	Praneel Naidu	29 January 1995 (aged 21)	0	0	(Fiji Football Association) Ba
3	DF	Filipe Baravilala	25 November 1994 (aged 21)	0	0	(Fiji Football Association) Suva
4	DF	Jale Dreloa	21 April 1995 (aged 21)	0	0	(Fiji Football Association) Suva
5	MF	Antonio Tuivuna	20 March 1995 (aged 21)	0	0	(Fiji Football Association) Nadi
6	FW	Anish Khem	27 September 1993 (aged 22)	0	0	(Fiji Football Association) Nadi
7	MF	Nickel Chand	28 July 1995 (aged 21)	0	0	(Fiji Football Association) Suva
8	FW	Setareki Hughes	8 June 1995 (aged 21)	0	0	(Fiji Football Association) Rewa
9	FW	Roy Krishna* (c)	30 August 1987 (aged 28)	0	0	(New Zealand Football) Wellington Phoenix
10	MF	Ratu Nakalevu	7 March 1994 (aged 22)	0	0	(Fiji Football Association) Rewa
11	DF	Alvin Singh*	9 June 1988 (aged 28)	0	0	(Fiji Football Association) Ba
12	MF	Tevita Waranaivalu	16 September 1995 (aged 20)	0	0	(Fiji Football Association) Rewa
13	FW	Iosefo Verevou	1 May 1996 (aged 20)	0	0	(Fiji Football Association) Rewa
14	FW	Samuela Nabenia	9 February 1995 (aged 21)	0	0	(Fiji Football Association) Ba
15	FW	Saula Waqa	10 December 1995 (aged 20)	0	0	(Fiji Football Association) Ba
16	MF	Joseph Turagabeci	19 November 1994 (aged 21)	0	0	(Fiji Football Association) Suva
18	GK	Shaneel Naidu	28 March 1995 (aged 21)	0	0	(Fiji Football Association) Dreketi

* Over-aged player.

Group play

Pos	Team	Pld	W	D	L	GF	GA	GD	Pts	Qualification
1	South Korea	3	2	1	0	12	3	+9	7	Quarter-finals
2	Germany	3	1	2	0	15	5	+10	5	Quarter-finals
3	Mexico	3	1	1	1	7	4	+3	4	
4	Fiji	3	0	0	3	1	23	−22	0	

Source: Rio2016 & FIFA
Rules for classification: Tiebreakers
4 August 2016
20:00

Fiji	0–8	South Korea
	Report (Rio2016); Report (FIFA)	Ryu Seung-woo 32', 63', 90+3'; Kwon Chang-hoon 62', 63'; Son Heung-min 72' (pen.); Suk Hyun-jun 77', 90'

Itaipava Arena Fonte Nova, Salvador
Attendance: 16,000
Referee: Malang Diedhiou (Senegal)

7 August 2016
13:00

Fiji	1–5	Mexico
Krishna 10'	Report (Rio2016); Report (FIFA)	Gutiérrez 48', 55', 58', 73'; Salcedo 67'

Itaipava Arena Fonte Nova, Salvador
Attendance: 11,200
Referee: Gehad Grisha (Egypt)

10 August 2016
16:00

Germany	10–0	Fiji
Gnabry 8', 45'; Petersen 14', 33', 40', 63' (pen.), 70'; Meyer 30', 49', 52'	Report (Rio2016); Report (FIFA)

Mineirão, Belo Horizonte
Attendance: 16,521
Referee: Fahad Al-Mirdasi (Saudi Arabia)

== Judo ==
Fiji qualified one judoka for the men's light-middleweight category (81 kg) at the Games. London 2012 Olympian Josateki Naulu earned a continental quota spot from the Oceania region as the highest-ranked Fijian judoka outside of direct qualifying position in the IJF World Ranking List of 30 May 2016. Naulu received a bye in the opening round, before facing Uzbekistan's Shakhzodbek Sabirov for his first match of the meet. He seized an early lead by scoring a yuko, until Sabirov clutched him on the tatami with a soto makikomi (outer wraparound) to score an ippon for a victory at one minute and thirty-one seconds, resulting to Naulu's defeat.

Athlete	Event	Round of 64	Round of 32	Round of 16	Quarterfinals	Semifinals	Repechage	Final / BM	
Athlete	Event	Opposition Result	Opposition Result	Opposition Result	Opposition Result	Opposition Result	Opposition Result	Opposition Result	Rank
Josateki Naulu	Men's −81 kg	Bye	Sabirov (UZB); L 001–100	Did not advance					

== Rugby sevens ==
=== Men's tournament ===
The Fijian men's rugby sevens team qualified for the Olympics by having achieved one of the top four places at the 2014–15 Sevens World Series.

Team roster

The following is the Fiji roster in the men's rugby sevens tournament of the 2016 Summer Olympics.

Head coach: Ben Ryan

No.	Pos.	Player	Date of birth (age)	Events	Points	Union
1	FW	Apisai Domolailai	16 April 1989 (aged 27)	20	117	(Fiji) Daveta
2	FW	Jasa Veremalua	29 May 1988 (aged 28)	24	255	(Fiji) Red Rock
3	FW	Semi Kunatani	27 October 1990 (aged 25)	19	295	(France) Toulouse
4	FW	Viliame Mata	22 October 1991 (aged 24)	9	55	(Scotland) Edinburgh
5	FW	Leone Nakarawa	2 April 1988 (aged 28)	7	35	(France) Racing 92
6	BK	Kitione Taliga	21 April 1993 (aged 23)	9	183	(Fiji) Wardens
7	BK	Osea Kolinisau (c)	17 November 1985 (aged 30)	52	1,026	(Fiji) Covenant Brothers
8	BK	Josua Tuisova	4 February 1994 (aged 22)	2	30	(France) Toulon
9	BK	Jerry Tuwai	23 March 1989 (aged 27)	18	222	(Fiji) Daveta
10	BK	Samisoni Nasagavesi	25 April 1988 (aged 28)	24	520	(France) Montauban
11	BK	Savenaca Rawaca	20 August 1991 (aged 24)	16	385	(England) Saracens
12	BK	Vatemo Ravouvou	31 July 1990 (aged 26)	12	542	(Fiji) Westfield Dragons
13	FW	Masivesi Dakuwaqa	14 February 1994 (aged 22)	5	55	(Fiji) Westfield Dragons

Group play

Pos	Team	Pld	W	D	L	PF	PA	PD	Pts	Qualification
1	Fiji	3	3	0	0	85	45	+40	9	Quarter-finals
2	Argentina	3	2	0	1	62	35	+27	7	Quarter-finals
3	United States	3	1	0	2	59	41	+18	5	
4	Brazil	3	0	0	3	12	97	−85	3	

Source: World Rugby
Rules for classification: 1) Points; 2) Head-to-head result; 3) Point difference; 4) Points scored.

9 August 2016
13:30

Fiji	40–12	Brazil
Try: Veremalua (2) 6' c, 12' c Kolinisau 8' c Tuisova (2) 9' m, 13' c Viriviri 10' c Con: Kolinisau (2/2); Ravouvou (3/4)	Report (Rio 2016); Report (World Rugby)	Try: Claro 4' m Albuquerque 14' c Con: Duque (0/1); A. Silva (1/1)

Deodoro Stadium, Rio de Janeiro
Referee: Federico Anselmi (Argentina)

9 August 2016
18:30

Fiji	21–14	Argentina
Try: Tuisova 2' c Taliga (2) 11' c, 12' c Con: Ravouvou (1/1); Kolinisau (2/2)	Report (Rio 2016); Report (World Rugby)	Try: Sábato 5' c Álvarez 8' c Con: Revol (2/2)

Deodoro Stadium, Rio de Janeiro
Referee: Rasta Rasivhenge (South Africa)

10 August 2016
13:30

Fiji	24–19	United States
Try: Kolinisau 6' c Ravouvou 7' m Mata 9' c Kunatani 12' m Con: Kolinisau (2/3); Ravouvou (0/1)	Report	Try: Barrett 4' c Baker 8' c Ebner 13' m Con: Hughes (2/3)

Deodoro Stadium, Rio de Janeiro
Referee: Richard Kelly (New Zealand)

Quarterfinal

10 August 2016
17:00

Fiji	12–7	New Zealand
Try: Kolinisau 2' m Tuwai 8' c Con: Ravouvou (0/1); Kolinisau (1/1)	Report (Rio 2016); Report (World Rugby)	Try: Kaka 6' c Con: Pulu (1/1)

Deodoro Stadium, Rio de Janeiro
Referee: Rasta Rasivhenge (South Africa)

Semifinal

11 August 2016
14:30

Fiji	20–5	Japan
Try: Ravouvou 1' m Tuisova 6' m Kunatani 9' m Tuwai 10' m Con: Ravouvou (0/3); Kolinisau (0/1)	Report (Rio 2016); Report (World Rugby)	Try: Goto 4' m Con: Lemeki (0/1)

Deodoro Stadium, Rio de Janeiro
Referee: Mike Adamson (Great Britain)

Gold medal match

11 August 2016
19:00

(gold) Fiji	43–7	Great Britain (silver)
Try: Kolinisau 1' m Tuwai 3' c Veremalua 7' m Nakarawa 8' m Ravouvou 10' c Tuisova 14' c Mata 19' c Con: Ravouvou (1/2); Kolinisau (2/4); Taliga (1/1)	Report (Rio 2016); Report (World Rugby)	Try: Norton 16' c Con: Watson (1/1)

Deodoro Stadium, Rio de Janeiro
Referee: Rasta Rasivhenge (South Africa)

Team details

Fiji	Great Britain

P	3	Semi Kunatani
L	5	Leone Nakarawa
H	2	Jasa Veremalua
FL	7	Osea Kolinisau (c)
FH	10	Samisoni Viriviri
C	12	Masivesi Dakuwaqa
SH	9	Seremaia Tuwai
Substitutes:
P	1	Apisai Domolailai
L	4	Viliame Mata
N	8	Josua Tuisova
FL	6	Kitione Taliga
Head Coach:
(England) Ben Ryan

P	3	Phil Burgess
N	8	James Davies
L	5	James Rodwell
C	12	Mark Bennett
FL	7	Dan Bibby
FL	6	Tom Mitchell (c)
L	4	Dan Norton
Substitutes:
FH	10	Sam Cross
SH	9	Ollie Lindsay-Hague
P	1	Mark Robertson
W	11	Marcus Watson
H	2	Ruaridh McConnochie
Head Coach:
(England) Simon Amor

=== Women's tournament ===
The Fijian women's rugby sevens team qualified for the Olympics by winning the 2015 FORU Women's Sevens Championships.

Team roster

The following is the Fiji roster in the women's rugby sevens tournament of the 2016 Summer Olympics.

Head coach: Chris Cracknell

Backs		Forwards
3	Raijieli Daveau	1	Litia Naiqato
4	Asena Rokomarama	2	Merewai Cumu
7	Rusila Nagasau	5	Timaima Tamoi
8	Lavenia Tinai	6	Rebecca Tavo
9	Ana Maria Roqica (c)	13	Jiowana Sauto
10	Viniana Riwai
11	Luisa Tisolo
12	Timaima Ravisa

- Jiowana Sauto was included in the day 3 squad after Daveau was injured in day 2.

Group play

Pos	Team	Pld	W	D	L	PF	PA	PD	Pts	Qualification
1	Australia	3	2	1	0	101	12	+89	8	Quarter-finals
2	Fiji	3	2	0	1	48	43	+5	7	Quarter-finals
3	United States	3	1	1	1	67	24	+43	6	Quarter-finals
4	Colombia	3	0	0	3	0	137	−137	3	

Source: World Rugby
Rules for classification: 1) Points; 2) Head-to-head result; 3) Point difference; 4) Points scored.

6 August 2016
13:00

United States	7–12	Fiji
Try: Kelter 10' c Con: Baravilala (1/1)	Report (Rio 2016); Report (World Rugby)	Try: Tisolo 4' c Ravisa 8' m Con: Tisolo (1/2)

Deodoro Stadium, Rio de Janeiro
Referee: Rasta Rasivhenge (South Africa)

6 August 2016
18:30

Australia	36–0	Fiji
Try: Cherry 1' c Tonegato (2) 4' m, 13' c Caslick 5' c Green 10' m Dalton 14' m Con: Dalton (3/6)	Report (Rio 2016); Report (World Rugby)

Deodoro Stadium, Rio de Janeiro
Referee: Sara Cox (Great Britain)

7 August 2016
13:00

Fiji	36–0	Colombia
Try: Daveau (2) 1' c, 3' m Tinai 5' c Roqica 7' m Riwai 9' c Nagasau 14' m Con: Tinai (2/4); Riwai (1/1); Tisolo (0/1)	Report (Rio 2016); Report (World Rugby)

Deodoro Stadium, Rio de Janeiro
Referee: Rose Labreche (Canada)

Quarterfinal

7 August 2016
18:00

Great Britain	26–7	Fiji
Try: Brown (2) 1' c, 12' c Richardson 4' c Waterman 7' m Con: McLean (3/4)	Report (Rio 2016); Report (World Rugby)	Try: Naiqato 3' c Con: Tinai (1/1)

Deodoro Stadium, Rio de Janeiro
Referee: Alhambra Nievas (Spain)

Classification semifinal (5–8)

8 August 2016
14:00

Fiji	7–12	United States
Try: Tavo 4' c Con: Tinai (1/1)	Report (Rio 2016); Report (World Rugby)	Try: Kelter 10' c Stephens 12' m Con: Kelter (1/1); Baravilala (0/1)

Deodoro Stadium, Rio de Janeiro
Referee: Jess Beard (New Zealand)

Seventh place match

8 August 2016
17:30

Spain	21–0	Fiji
Try: P. García 3' c Erbina 5' c Etxebarría 7' c Con: P. García (3/3)	Report (Rio 2016); Report (World Rugby)

Deodoro Stadium, Rio de Janeiro
Referee: Beatrice Benvenuti (Italy)

== Shooting ==
Fiji qualified one shooter in the men's trap by securing one of the available Olympic berths at the 2015 Oceania Continental Championships in Sydney, Australia.

Athlete	Event	Qualification		Semifinal		Final	
Athlete	Event	Points	Rank	Points	Rank	Points	Rank
Glenn Kable	Men's trap	112	23	Did not advance			

== Swimming ==
Fiji received a Universality invitation from FINA to send two swimmers (one male and one female) to the Olympics.

Athlete	Event	Heat		Semifinal		Final	
Athlete	Event	Time	Rank	Time	Rank	Time	Rank
Meli Malani	Men's 50 m freestyle	23.88	51	Did not advance			
Matelita Buadromo	Women's 200 m freestyle	2:05.49	40	Did not advance			

== Table tennis ==
Fiji entered one athlete into the table tennis competition at the Games for the first time in the nation's Olympic history. Sally Yee secured a spot in the women's singles by virtue of her top three finish at the 2016 Oceania Qualification Tournament in Bendigo, Australia.

Athlete	Event	Preliminary	Round 1	Round 2	Round 3	Round of 16	Quarterfinals	Semifinals	Final / BM	
Athlete	Event	Opposition Result	Opposition Result	Opposition Result	Opposition Result	Opposition Result	Opposition Result	Opposition Result	Opposition Result	Rank
Sally Yee	Women's singles	Edem (NGR); L 0–4	Did not advance							

== Weightlifting ==
Fiji qualified one male and one female weightlifter for the Rio Olympics by virtue of a top five national finish (for men) and top four (for women), respectively, at the 2016 Oceania Championships. The team must allocate these places to individual athletes by 20 June 2016.

Athlete	Event	Snatch		Clean & Jerk		Total	Rank
Athlete	Event	Result	Rank	Result	Rank	Total	Rank
Manueli Tulo	Men's −56 kg	106	16	136	13	242	13
Apolonia Vaivai	Women's −69 kg	88	15	113	11	201	11
