= Fiji at the 2024 Summer Olympics =

- IOC code: FIJ
- NOC: Fiji Association of Sports and National Olympic Committee
- Website: www.fasanoc.org.fj

in Paris, France 26 July 2024 – 11 August 2024
- Competitors: 34 (17 men and 17 women) in 7 sports
- Flag bearers (opening): Viliame Ratulu & Raijieli Daveua
- Flag bearers (closing): David Young & Venice Traill
- Medals Ranked 74th: Gold 0 Silver 1 Bronze 0 Total 1

Summer Olympics appearances (overview)
- 1956; 1960; 1964; 1968; 1972; 1976; 1980; 1984; 1988; 1992; 1996; 2000; 2004; 2008; 2012; 2016; 2020; 2024; 2028

Fiji competed at the 2024 Summer Olympics in Paris from 26 July to 11 August 2024. Since the nation's debut in 1956. Fijian athletes have appeared in every edition of the Summer Olympic Games, except for two occasions. Fiji failed to register any athletes at the 1964 Summer Olympics in Tokyo and eventually joined the American-led boycott when Moscow hosted the 1980 Summer Olympics.

== Medalists ==
Medal	Name	Sport	Event	Date
Silver	Fiji national rugby sevens team: Ponepati Loganimasi; Iosefo Masi; Jerry Matana; Sevuloni Mocenacagi; Waisea Nacuqu; Joji Nasova; Josaia Raisuqe; Kaminieli Rasaku; Selestino Ravutaumada; Filipe Sauturaga; Joseva Talacolo; Terio Tamani; Iowane Teba; Jerry Tuwai	Rugby sevens	Men's tournament	27 July

Medals by sport
Sport	1st place, gold medalist(s)	2nd place, silver medalist(s)	3rd place, bronze medalist(s)	Total
Rugby sevens	0	1	0	1
Total	0	1	0	1

Medals by gender
Gender	1st place, gold medalist(s)	2nd place, silver medalist(s)	3rd place, bronze medalist(s)	Total
Male	0	1	0	1
Female	0	0	0	0
Mixed	0	0	0	0
Total	0	1	0	1

Medals by date
Date	1st place, gold medalist(s)	2nd place, silver medalist(s)	3rd place, bronze medalist(s)	Total
27 July	0	1	0	1
Total	0	1	0	1

== Competitors ==
The following is the list of number of competitors in the Games.

Sport	Men	Women	Total
Athletics	1	0	1
Judo	1	0	1
Rugby sevens	12	13	25
Sailing	1	1	2
Swimming	1	1	2
Table tennis	1	0	1
Taekwondo	0	2	2
Total	17	17	34

== Athletics ==
Fiji sent one sprinter to compete at the 2024 Summer Olympics.

Key

- Note–Ranks given for track events are within the athlete's heat only
- Q = Qualified for the next round
- q = Qualified for the next round as a fastest loser or, in field events, by position without achieving the qualifying target
- NR = National record
- N/A = Round not applicable for the event
- Bye = Athlete not required to compete in round

Track events

Athlete	Event	Preliminary		Heat		Semifinal		Final	
Athlete	Event	Result	Rank	Result	Rank	Result	Rank	Result	Rank
Waisake Tewa	Men's 100 m	10.73 SB	7	Did not advance					

== Judo ==
Fiji qualified one judoka for the following weight class at the Games. Gerard Takayawa (men's super-heavyweight, +100 kg) got qualified via continental quota based on Olympic point rankings.

Athlete	Event	Round of 64	Round of 32	Round of 16	Quarterfinals	Semifinals	Repechage	Final / BM	
Athlete	Event	Opposition Result	Opposition Result	Opposition Result	Opposition Result	Opposition Result	Opposition Result	Opposition Result	Rank
Gerard Takayawa	Men's +100 kg	—N/a	Fízeľ (SVK); L 00–10	Did not advance					

== Rugby sevens ==
Summary

Team	Event	Pool round				Quarterfinal	Semifinal / Cl.	Final / BM / Cl.	
Team	Event	Opposition Result	Opposition Result	Opposition Result	Rank	Opposition Result	Opposition Result	Opposition Result	Rank
Fiji men's	Men's tournament	Uruguay; W 40–12	United States; W 38–12	France; W 19–12	1 Q	Ireland; W 19–15	Australia; W 31–7	France; L 7–28	2nd place, silver medalist(s)
Fiji women's	Women's tournament	Canada; L 14–17	China; L 12–40	New Zealand; L 7–38	4	—N/a	Brazil; L 22–28	South Africa; L 15–21	12

=== Men's tournament ===
Fiji national rugby sevens team qualified for the Olympics by securing the third of the four available places in the 2022–23 World Rugby Sevens Series.

Team roster

Fiji's squad of 12 players was finalized on 18 July 2024. Additionally, Josaia Raisuqe and Filipe Sauturaga were named as traveling reserves.

Head coach: Osea Kolinisau

No.	Player	Date of birth (age)
1	Joji Nasova	9 June 2000 (aged 24)
2	Joseva Talacolo	1 April 1997 (aged 27)
3	Jeremaia Matana	14 July 1998 (aged 26)
4	Sevuloni Mocenacagi	29 June 1990 (aged 34)
5	Iosefo Baleiwairiki	9 May 1998 (aged 26)
6	Ponepati Loganimasi	26 March 1998 (aged 26)
7	Terio Veilawa	6 July 1994 (aged 30)
8	Waisea Nacuqu	24 May 1993 (aged 31)
9	Jerry Tuwai (c)	23 March 1989 (aged 35)
10	Iowane Teba	23 February 1993 (aged 31)
11	Kaminieli Rasaku	12 July 1999 (aged 25)
12	Selestino Ravutaumada	17 January 2000 (aged 24)
13	Josaia Raisuqe	22 July 1994 (aged 30)

Group stage

Pos	Team	Pld	W	D	L	PF	PA	PD	Pts	Qualification
1	Fiji	3	3	0	0	97	36	+61	9	Advance to Quarter-finals
2	France (H)	3	1	1	1	43	43	0	6	Advance to Quarter-finals
3	United States	3	1	1	1	57	67	−10	6	Advance to Quarter-finals
4	Uruguay	3	0	0	3	41	92	−51	3	

Source: World Rugby
Rules for classification: 1) Points; 2) Head-to-head result; 3) Point difference; 4) Points scored.
(H) Hosts

24 July 2024
17:00

Fiji	40–12	Uruguay
Try: Nasova (2) 2' m, 7' c Loganimasi 5' c Nacuqu 8' c Teba 11' c Ravutaumada 15' c Con: Nacuqu (3/4) 6', 7', 8'; Teba (1/1) 12'; Tamani (1/1) 25'	World Rugby	Try: González 4' c Basso 10' m Con: Lijtenstein (1/1) 4'

Stade de France, Paris
Attendance: 69,000
Referee: Ben Breakspear (Wales/Great Britain)

24 July 2024
20:30

Fiji	38–12	United States
Try: Teba 2' m Rasaku 4' c Ravutaumada 5' m Raisuqe 7' m Baleiwairiki 8' m Nacuqu 10' c Con: Teba (4/5) 3', 5', 7', 9'	World Rugby	Try: Bizer 5' c Baker 11' m Con: Hughes (1/1) 12'

Stade de France, Paris
Attendance: 69,000
Referee: Jordan Way (Australia)

25 July 2024
15:30

Fiji	19–12	France
Try: Tuwai 6' m Rasaku 9' c Nasova 13' c Con: Teba (1/2) 10'; Veilawa (1/1) 14'	World Rugby	Try: Grandidier Nkanang 4' m Timo 15' c Con: Rebbadj (1/1) 16'

Stade de France, Paris
Attendance: 70,000
Referee: AJ Jacobs (South Africa)

Quarter-final

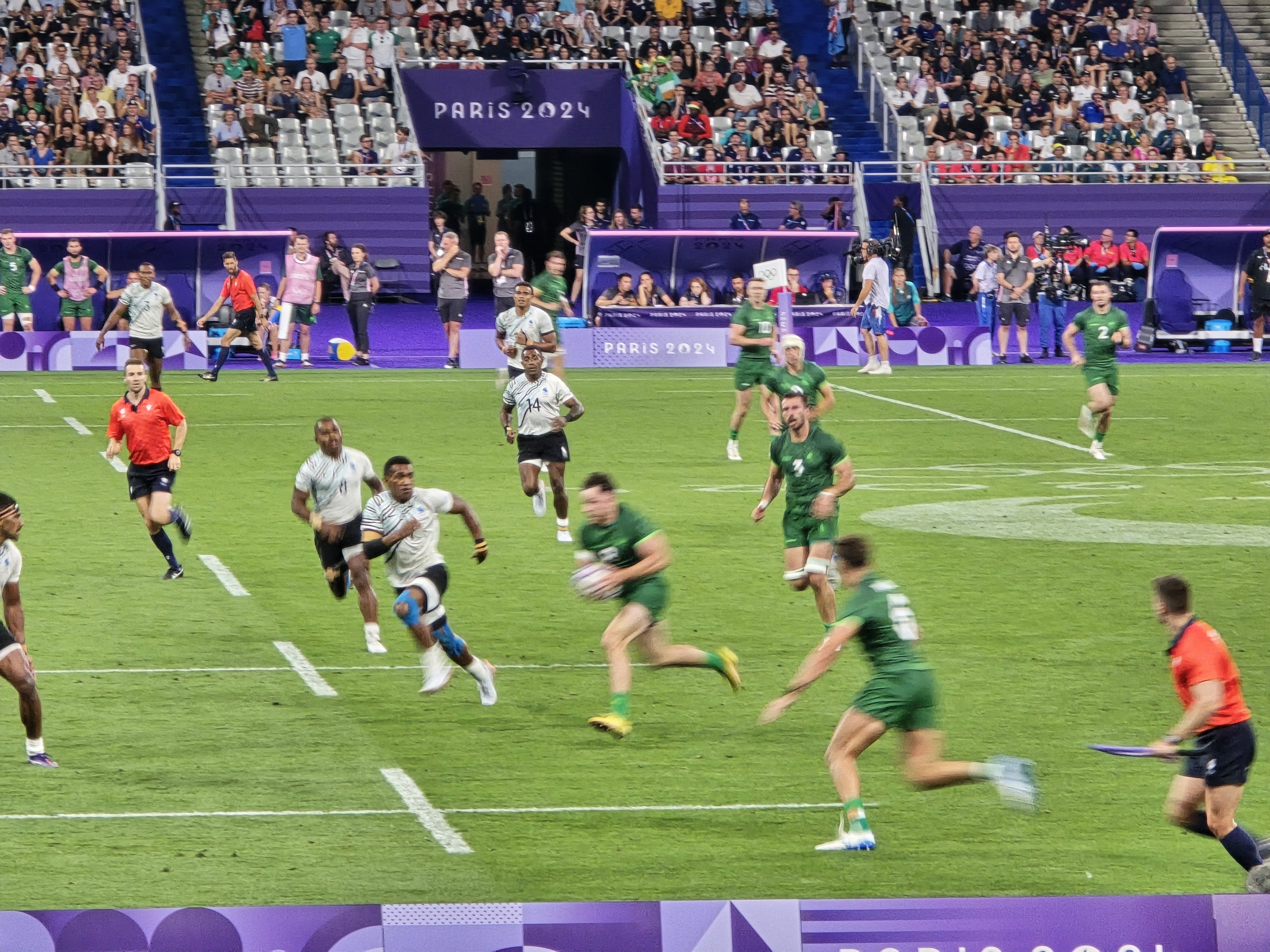
Ireland in possession against Fiji

25 July 2024
22:00

Fiji	19–15	Ireland
Try: Baleiwairiki 1' c Nasova 12' c Nacuqu 12' m Con: Teba (1/1) 2'; Tamani (1/1) 13'	World Rugby	Try: Mullins (2) 5' m, 7' m Ward 9' m

Stade de France, Paris
Attendance: 70,000
Referee: Nick Hogan (New Zealand)

Semi-final

27 July 2024
16:00

Fiji	31–7	Australia
Try: Nasova 8' c Baleiwairiki 8' c Rasaku 11' c Ravutaumada 14' c Con: Teba (2/2) 8', 9'; Nacuqu (2/2) 15'; Pen: Veilawa (1/1) 14'	World Rugby	Try: Dowling 6' c Con: Roache (1/1) 6'

Stade de France, Paris
Referee: AJ Jacobs (South Africa)

=== Women's tournament ===
Fiji women's national rugby sevens team qualified for the Olympics by virtue of the highest rank eligible nation's, not yet qualified, at the 2023 Oceania Sevens Championship.

Team roster

Fiji's squad of 13 players was finalized on 18 July 2024. Additionally Rogosau Adimereani was named as a traveling reserve.

Head coach: Saiasi Fuli

- Verenaisi Ditavutu
- Kolora Lomani
- Sesenieli Donu
- Alowesi Nakoci
- Ana Maria Naimasi
- Adi Vani Buleki
- Ilisapeci Delaiwau
- Reapi Ulunisau
- Lavena Cavuru
- Raijieli Daveua
- Maria Rokutuisiga
- Laisana Likuceva
- Talei Wilson

Group stage

Pos	Team	Pld	W	D	L	PF	PA	PD	Pts	Qualification
1	New Zealand	3	3	0	0	114	19	+95	9	Quarter-finals
2	Canada	3	2	0	1	50	64	−14	7	Quarter-finals
3	China	3	1	0	2	62	81	−19	5	Quarter-finals
4	Fiji	3	0	0	3	33	95	−62	3	

Source: World Rugby
Rules for classification: 1) Points; 2) Head-to-head result; 3) Point difference; 4) Points scored.

28 July 2024
17:30

Fiji	14–17	Canada
Try: Rokotuisiga 9' c Likuceva 15' c Con: Naimasi (1/1) 9'; Ulunisau (1/1) 15'	World Rugby	Try: Symonds 4' c Williams 6' m Wardley 12' m Con: Daniels (1/3) 5'

Stade de France, Paris
Referee: Craig Chan (Hong Kong)

28 July 2024
21:00

Fiji	12–40	China
Try: Nakoci 3' c Delaiwau 9' m Con: Naimasi (1/2) 3'	World Rugby	Try: Wang 1' m Yang 5' c Yan 7' c Chen 8' c Liu 11' c Dou 13' c Con: Gu (4/4) 5', 8', 9', 12'; Chen (1/1) 13'

Stade de France, Paris
Referee: Maggie Cogger-Orr (New Zealand)

29 July 2024
16:30

New Zealand	38–7	Fiji
Try: Miller 1' c Felix-Hotham 5' c Waaka (2) 7' c, 9' c Blyde 10' m Nuku 13' m Con: Pouri-Lane (4/4) 1', 5', 8', 10'	World Rugby	Try: Buleki 14' c Con: Ulunisau (1/1) 15'

Stade de France, Paris
Referee: Kat Roche (United States)

9–12th place playoff semi-final

29 July 2024
20:30

Fiji	22–28	Brazil
Try: Buleki 2' m Naimasi (2) 4' m, 13' c Likuceva 11'; Con: Naimasi (1/2) 13'	World Rugby	Try: Lima (2) 1' c, 8' c Costa 6' c Soares 15' c Con: Kochhann (4/4) 1', 6', 8', 15'

Stade de France, Paris
Referee: Talal Chaudhry (Canada)

Eleventh place match

30 July 2024
16:30

South Africa	21–15	Fiji
Try: Roos (2) 1' c, 4' c Mpupha 9' c Con: Roos (3/3) 2', 4', 9'	World Rugby	Try: Lomani 11' m Ditavutu 12' m Wilson 15' m

Stade de France, Paris
Referee: Ano Kuwai (Japan)

== Sailing ==
Fijian sailors qualified one boat in each of the following classes through the 2023 Sail Sydney in Sydney, Australia.

Medal race events

Athlete	Event	Race													Net points	Final rank
Athlete	Event	1	2	3	4	5	6	7	8	9	10	11	12	M*	Net points	Final rank
Viliame Ratulu	Men's ILCA 7	~~43~~	43	41	41	42	42	32	42	Cancelled		—N/a		EL	283	43
Sophia Morgan	Women's ILCA 6	33	28	20	38	~~40~~	38	33	38	29	Cancelled	—N/a		EL	257	37

M = Medal race; EL = Eliminated – did not advance into the medal race

== Swimming ==
Fiji sent two swimmers to compete at the 2024 Paris Olympics.

Athlete	Event	Heat		Semifinal		Final	
Athlete	Event	Time	Rank	Time	Rank	Time	Rank
David Young	Men's 50 m freestyle	22.71	40	Did not advance			
Anahira McCutcheon	Women's 50 m freestyle	26.88	37	Did not advance			

== Table tennis ==
Fiji entered one table tennis player to participate at the Olympics tournament. Vicky Wu qualified for the games in the men's singles competitions, through the re-allocations of Oceanian quota, in the world ranking.

Athlete	Event	Preliminary	Round of 64	Round of 32	Round of 16	Quarterfinals	Semifinals	Final / BM	
Athlete	Event	Opposition Result	Opposition Result	Opposition Result	Opposition Result	Opposition Result	Opposition Result	Opposition Result	Rank
Vicky Wu	Men's singles	Bye	Pitchford (GBR); L 0–4	Did not advance					

== Taekwondo ==
For the first time, Fiji qualified two athlete to compete at the games. Venice Traill qualified for the games following the triumph of winning the gold medal match, in her weight classes; meanwhile Lolohea Navuga Naitasi qualified for the games, by securing the re-allocations of New Zealand berth; at the 2024 Oceania Qualification Tournament in Honiara, Solomon Islands.

Athlete	Event	Round of 16	Quarterfinals	Semifinals	Repechage	Final / BM	
Athlete	Event	Opposition Result	Opposition Result	Opposition Result	Opposition Result	Opposition Result	Rank
Lolohea Navuga Naitasi	Women's –67 kg	Al-Sadeq (JOR); L 0–2	Did not advance				
Venice Traill	Women's +67 kg	McGowan (GBR); L 0–2	Did not advance				
