= Fiji at the 1988 Summer Olympics =

- IOC code: FIJ
- NOC: Fiji Association of Sports and National Olympic Committee

in Seoul
- Competitors: 23 in 5 sports
- Flag bearer: Viliame Takayawa
- Officials: 10
- Medals: Gold 0 Silver 0 Bronze 0 Total 0

Summer Olympics appearances (overview)
- 1956; 1960; 1964; 1968; 1972; 1976; 1980; 1984; 1988; 1992; 1996; 2000; 2004; 2008; 2012; 2016; 2020; 2024

Fiji competed at the 1988 Summer Olympics in Seoul, South Korea. The Fiji Association of Sports and National Olympic Committee was formed in 1949 and recognized by the IOC in 1955.

== Competitors ==
The following is the list of number of competitors in the Games.

Sport	Men	Women	Total
Athletics	7	1	8
Boxing	2	–	2
Judo	3	–	3
Sailing	5	0	5
Swimming	2	3	5
Total	19	4	23

== Athletics ==
=== Men ===
==== Track events ====
Athlete	Events	Heat		Semifinal		Final	
Athlete	Events	Time	Position	Time	Position	Time	Position
Maloni Bole	100 m	11.19	91	Did not advance			
Maloni Bole	200 m	22.44	63	Did not advance			
Moses Khan	1500 m	4:03.20	55	Did not advance			
Albert Miller	110 m Hurdles	14.86	35	Did not advance			
Albert Miller	Decathlon					7016 pts	32
Lui Muavesi	800 m	1:54.48	59	Did not advance			
Bineshwar Prasad	10,000 m	33:30.43	42			Did not advance	
Bineshwar Prasad	Marathon					2:41:50	76
Joseph Rodan	400 m	48.69	56	Did not advance			
Joseph Rodan	400 m Hurdles	53.66	35	Did not advance			
Davendra Prakash Singh	5000 m	DNS	-	Did not advance			
Davendra Prakash Singh	3000 m Steeplechase	9:23.50	30	Did not advance			

=== Women ===
==== Track events ====
Athlete	Events	Heat		Semifinal		Final	
Athlete	Events	Time	Position	Time	Position	Time	Position
Sainiana Tukana	100 m hurdles	15.50	33	Did not advance			
Sainiana Tukana	Heptathlon					2560 pts	26

== Boxing ==
Athlete	Event	Round of 64	Round of 32	Round of 16	Quarterfinals	Semifinals	Final
Athlete	Event	Opposition Result	Opposition Result	Opposition Result	Opposition Result	Opposition Result	Opposition Result
Isimeli Lesivakarua	Welterweight	Sören Antman (SWE); L RSCH	Did not advance				
Apete Temo	Light Welterweight		Humberto Rodriguez (MEX); L RSCH	Did not advance			

== Judo ==
Men

Athlete	Event	Preliminary	Round of 32	Round of 16	Quarterfinals	Semifinals	First repechage round	Repechage quarterfinals	Repechage semifinals	Final
Athlete	Event	Opposition Result	Opposition Result	Opposition Result	Opposition Result	Opposition Result	Opposition Result	Opposition Result	Opposition Result	Opposition Result
Josateki Basalusalu	−86 kg		Vladimir Chestakov (RUS); L 0010-1011	Did not advance			Heng-An Chiu (TPE); L 0000-0122	Did not advance		
Simione Kuruvoli	−78 kg	Sodnom Erhembayar (MGL); L 0000-1000	Did not advance							
Viliame Takayawa	−95 kg		Stephane Traineau (FRA); L 0000-1000	Did not advance						

== Sailing ==
Men

Athlete	Event	Race							Score	Rank
Athlete	Event	1	2	3	4	5	6	7	Score	Rank
David Ashby; Colin Dunlop; Colin Philp, Sr.	Soling	20	19	17	20	15	20	16	143	19
Tony Philp	Division II	28	DSQ	18	23	18	27	RET	196	28
Colin Philp Jr.	Finn	RET	30	26	24	24	DSQ	20	194	29

== Swimming ==
=== Men ===
Athlete	Events	Heat		Final B		Final A	
Athlete	Events	Time	Position	Time	Position	Time	Position
Jason Chute	50 m freestyle	26.46	62	Did not advance			
Jason Chute	100 m freestyle	58.14	70	Did not advance			
Jason Chute	200 m freestyle	2:09.05	60	Did not advance			
Warren Sorby	50 m freestyle	25.64	57	Did not advance			
Warren Sorby	100 m freestyle	56.66	66	Did not advance			

=== Women ===
Athlete	Events	Heat		Final B		Final A	
Athlete	Events	Time	Position	Time	Position	Time	Position
Angela Birch	50 m freestyle	29.01	44	Did not advance			
Angela Birch	100 m freestyle	1:02.91	51	Did not advance			
Angela Birch	200 m freestyle	2:16.79	43	Did not advance			
Angela Birch	100 m backstroke	1:13.48	37	Did not advance			
Angela Birch	200 m individual medley	2:39.20	35	Did not advance			
Sharon Pickering	100 m backstroke	1:12.14	36	Did not advance			
Sharon Pickering	200 m backstroke	2:36.99	32	Did not advance			
Sharon Pickering	200 m individual medley	2:35.22	34	Did not advance			
Sharon Pickering	100 m butterfly	1:10.51	37	Did not advance			
Cina Munch	50 m freestyle	28.55	39	Did not advance			
Cina Munch	100 m freestyle	1:03.06	52	Did not advance			
Cina Munch	200 m freestyle	2:18.45	44	Did not advance			
Cina Munch	100 m butterfly	1:12.03	38	Did not advance			
