= Fiji at the 1984 Summer Olympics =

- IOC code: FIJ
- NOC: Fiji Association of Sports and National Olympic Committee

in Los Angeles
- Competitors: 14 (11 men, 3 women) in 5 sports
- Flag bearer: Viliame Takayawa
- Medals: Gold 0 Silver 0 Bronze 0 Total 0

Summer Olympics appearances (overview)
- 1956; 1960; 1964; 1968; 1972; 1976; 1980; 1984; 1988; 1992; 1996; 2000; 2004; 2008; 2012; 2016; 2020; 2024

Fiji sent a delegation to compete at the 1984 Summer Olympics in Los Angeles, United States from 28 July to 12 August 1984. This was the nation's sixth appearance at a Summer Olympic Games. Their first appearance was at the 1956 Summer Olympics in Melbourne, Australia. Fiji's delegation consisted of fourteen competitors with the most being in Athletics and Sailing with four competitors. Swimming had three, while Judo and Cycling also saw Fiji compete in those sports.

== Athletics ==
Key

- Note–Ranks given for track events are within the athlete's heat only
- Q = Qualified for the next round
- q = Qualified for the next round as a fastest loser or, in field events, by position without achieving the qualifying target

Track events

| Athletes | Events | Heat | | Quarter finals | | Semi finals | | Final | |
| Athletes | Events | Time | Rank | Time | Rank | Time | Rank | Time | Rank |
|---|---|---|---|---|---|---|---|---|---|
| Joseph Rodan | Men's 400 m | 49.00 | 5 | did not advance | | | | | |
| Miriama Tuisorisori | Women's 100 m | 13.04 | 5 | did not advance | | | | | |

Combined event – Decathlon

| Athlete | Event | 100 m | LJ | SP | HJ | 400 m | 110H | DT | PV | JT | 1500 m | Points | Rank |
|---|---|---|---|---|---|---|---|---|---|---|---|---|---|
| Albert Miller | Result | 11.48 | 6.32 | 13.07 | 1.91 | 50.22 | 15.36 | 38.46 | NM | DNS | - | DNF | |

== Cycling ==
One cyclists represented Fiji in 1984.

=== Road ===
| Athlete | Event | Time | Rank |
|---|---|---|---|
| Kathlyn Ragg | Women's road race | 2:25:59 | 32 |

== Judo ==
Fiji entered two male judoka into the Olympic tournament

| Athlete | Event | Round of 64 | Round of 32 | Round of 16 | Quarterfinals | Semifinals | Repechage | Final / BM | |
| Athlete | Event | Opposition Result | Opposition Result | Opposition Result | Opposition Result | Opposition Result | Opposition Result | Opposition Result | Rank |
|---|---|---|---|---|---|---|---|---|---|
| Simione Kuruvoli | Men's −78 kg | Bye | Hussain (EGY); L | Did not advance | | | | | |
| Viliame Takayawa | Men's −95 kg | n/a | Neureuther (FRG); L | Did not advance | | | | | |

== Sailing ==
- Tony Philp

== Swimming ==
Men's 100m Freestyle

- Samuela Tupou
  - Heat — 55.85 (→ did not advance, 54th place)
- Warren Sorby
  - Heat — 56.75 (→ did not advance, 57th place)

Men's 200m Freestyle

- Samuela Tupou
  - Heat — 2:02.22 (→ did not advance, 46th place)

Men's 100m Backstroke

- Warren Sorby
  - Heat — 1:05.81 (→ did not advance, 40th place)

Men's 100m Butterfly

- Warren Sorby
  - Heat — 1:05.53 (→ did not advance, 48th place)
- Samuela Tupou
  - Heat — 1:07.75 (→ did not advance, 51st place)

Men's 200m Individual Medley

- Samuela Tupou
  - Heat — 2:19.79 (→ did not advance, 34th place)
- Warren Sorby
  - Heat — 2:22.74 (→ did not advance, 39th place)

Women's 100m Freestyle

- Sharon Pickering
  - Heat — 1:04.25 (→ did not advance, 43rd place)

Women's 200m Freestyle

- Sharon Pickering
  - Heat — 2:19.31 (→ did not advance, 35th place)

Women's 100m Backstroke

- Sharon Pickering
  - Heat — 1:10.49 (→ did not advance, 29th place)

Women's 200m Individual Medley

- Sharon Pickering
  - Heat — 2:34.77 (→ did not advance, 26th place)
