= Fiji at the 2004 Summer Olympics =

- IOC code: FIJ
- NOC: Fiji Association of Sports and National Olympic Committee
- Website: www.fasanoc.org.fj

in Athens
- Competitors: 8 in 6 sports
- Flag bearer: Sisilia Nasiga
- Medals: Gold 0 Silver 0 Bronze 0 Total 0

Summer Olympics appearances (overview)
- 1956; 1960; 1964; 1968; 1972; 1976; 1980; 1984; 1988; 1992; 1996; 2000; 2004; 2008; 2012; 2016; 2020; 2024

Fiji was represented at the 2004 Summer Olympics in Athens, Greece by the Fiji Association of Sports and National Olympic Committee.

In total, eight athletes including four men and four women represented Fiji in six different sports including archery, athletics, judo, shooting, swimming and weightlifting.

== Competitors ==
In total, eight athletes represented Fiji at the 2004 Summer Olympics in Athens, Greece across six different sports.

Sport	Men	Women	Total
Archery	1	0	1
Athletics	1	1	2
Judo	0	2	2
Shooting	1	0	1
Swimming	1	0	1
Weightlifting	0	1	1
Total	4	4	8

== Archery ==
In total, one Fijian athlete participated in the archery events – Rob Elder in the men's individual.

The ranking round for the men's individual took place on 12 August 2004. Elder scored 583 points and was ranked 61st. The first round took place on 16 August 2004. Merlos lost 154–138 to Park Kyung-Mo of South Korea.

Athlete	Event	Ranking round		Round of 64	Round of 32	Round of 16	Quarterfinals	Semifinals	Final / BM	
Athlete	Event	Score	Seed	Opposition Score	Opposition Score	Opposition Score	Opposition Score	Opposition Score	Opposition Score	Rank
Rob Elder	Men's individual	583	61	Park K-M (KOR); L 138–154	Did not advance					

== Athletics ==
In total, two Fijian athletes participated in the athletics events – Makelesi Bulikiobo in the women's 400 m and Isireli Naikelekelevesi in the men's 800 m.

The heats for the men's 800 m took place on 25 August 2004. Naikelekelevesi finished seventh in his heat in a time of one minute 49.08 seconds and he did not advance to the semi-finals.

Athlete	Event	Heat		Semifinal		Final	
Athlete	Event	Result	Rank	Result	Rank	Result	Rank
Isireli Naikelekelevesi	800 m	1:49.08	7	—		Did not advance	

The heats for the women's 400 m took place on 21 August 2004. Bulikiobo finished sixth in her heat in a time of 53.58 seconds and she did not advance to the semi-finals.

Athlete	Event	Heat		Semifinal		Final	
Athlete	Event	Result	Rank	Result	Rank	Result	Rank
Makelesi Bulikiobo	400 m	53.58	6	Did not advance			

== Judo ==
In total, two Fijian athletes participated in the judo events – Elina Nasaudrodro in the women's −57 kg category and Sisilia Nasiga in the women's −78 kg category.

The women's –57 kg category took place on 16 August 2004. In the first round, Nasaudrodro lost by ippon to Sophie Cox of Great Britain.

The women's –78 kg category took place on 19 August 2004. In the first round, Nasiga lost to Keivi Pinto of Venezuela.

Athlete	Event	Round of 32	Round of 16	Quarterfinals	Semifinals	Repechage 1	Repechage 2	Repechage 3	Final / BM	
Athlete	Event	Opposition Result	Opposition Result	Opposition Result	Opposition Result	Opposition Result	Opposition Result	Opposition Result	Opposition Result	Rank
Elina Nasaudrodro	Women's −57 kg	Cox (GBR); L 0000–1010	Did not advance							
Sisilia Nasiga	Women's −78 kg	Pinto (VEN); L 0000–0021	Did not advance							

== Shooting ==
In total, one Fijian athlete participated in the shooting events – Glenn Kable in the men's trap.

The preliminary round for the men's trap took place on 14 August 2004. Kable scored 111 points across the four rounds and was ranked 30th. He did not advance to the final.

Athlete	Event	Qualification		Final	
Athlete	Event	Points	Rank	Points	Rank
Glenn Kable	Trap	111	30	Did not advance	

== Swimming ==
In total, one Fijian athlete participated in the swimming events – Carl Probert in the men's 50 m freestyle and the men's 100 m freestyle.

The heats for the men's 100 m freestyle took place on 17 August 2004. Probert finished first in his heat in a time of 51.42 seconds which was ultimately not fast enough to advance to the semi-finals.

The heats for the men's 50 m freestyle took place on 19 August 2004. Probert finished second in his heat in a time of 23.31 seconds which was ultimately not fast enough to advance to the semi-finals.

Athlete	Event	Heat		Semifinal		Final	
Athlete	Event	Time	Rank	Time	Rank	Time	Rank
Carl Probert	50 m freestyle	23.31	40	Did not advance			
Carl Probert	100 m freestyle	51.42	40	Did not advance			

== Weightlifting ==
In total, one Fijian athlete participated in the weightlifting events – Ivy Shaw in the women's +75 kg category.

The women's +75 kg category took place on 21 August 2004. Shaw lifted 85 kg (snatch) and 100 kg (clean and jerk) for a combined total of 185 kg to finish 12th.

Athlete	Event	Snatch		Clean & Jerk		Total	Rank
Athlete	Event	Result	Rank	Result	Rank	Total	Rank
Ivy Shaw	Women's +75 kg	85	12	100	12	185	12

== See also ==
- Fiji at the 2004 Summer Paralympics
