= Fiji at the 1992 Summer Olympics =

- IOC code: FIJ
- NOC: Fiji Association of Sports and National Olympic Committee

in Barcelona
- Competitors: 18 in 4 sports
- Flag bearer: Carl Probert
- Medals: Gold 0 Silver 0 Bronze 0 Total 0

Summer Olympics appearances (overview)
- 1956; 1960; 1964; 1968; 1972; 1976; 1980; 1984; 1988; 1992; 1996; 2000; 2004; 2008; 2012; 2016; 2020; 2024

Fiji competed at the 1992 Summer Olympics in Barcelona, Spain.

== Competitors ==
The following is the list of number of competitors in the Games.

Sport	Men	Women	Total
Athletics	6	1	7
Judo	2	2	4
Sailing	4	0	4
Swimming	2	1	3
Total	14	4	18

== Athletics ==
Men
Track and road events

Athlete	Event	Heats		Quarterfinal		Semifinal		Final	
Athlete	Event	Result	Rank	Result	Rank	Result	Rank	Result	Rank
Gabrieli Qoro	100 metres	11.14	67	Did not advance					
Apisai Driu Baibai	200 metres	22.07	63	Did not advance					
Apisai Driu Baibai	400 metres	47.81	50	Did not advance					
Binesh Prasad	10,000 metres	31:46.19	50	—N/a				Did not advance	
Binesh Prasad	Marathon	—N/a						DNF	
Albert Miller	110 metres hurdles	14.88	37	Did not advance					
Autiko Daunakamakama	400 metres hurdles	53.90	40	Did not advance					
Davendra Prakash Singh	3000 metres steeplechase	9:07.49	31	—N/a		Did not advance			

Field events

Athlete	Event	Qualification		Final	
Athlete	Event	Distance	Position	Distance	Position
Gabrieli Qoro	Long jump	7.22	41	Did not advance	

Combined events – Decathlon

Athlete	Event	100 m	LJ	SP	HJ	400 m	110H	DT	PV	JT	1500 m	Final	Rank
Albert Miller	Result	11.40	6.50	13.21	1.82	50.76	15.08	39.90	3.80	57.80	4:48.81	6971	24
Albert Miller	Points	774	697	680	644	780	804	663	562	705	626	6971	24

Women
Track and road events

Athlete	Event	Heats		Quarterfinal		Semifinal		Final	
Athlete	Event	Result	Rank	Result	Rank	Result	Rank	Result	Rank
Vaciseva Tavaga	100 metres	12.47	49	Did not advance					
Vaciseva Tavaga	200 metres	25.07	45	Did not advance					

== Judo ==
Men

Athlete	Event	Round of 64	Round of 32	Round of 16	Quarterfinals	Semifinals	Repechage			Final	
Athlete	Event	Round of 64	Round of 32	Round of 16	Quarterfinals	Semifinals	Round 1	Round 2	Round 3	Final	
Athlete	Event	Opposition Result	Opposition Result	Opposition Result	Opposition Result	Opposition Result	Opposition Result	Opposition Result	Opposition Result	Opposition Result	Rank
Nacanieli Takayawa-Qerawaqa	78 kg	Schaffter (SUI); L Ippon	Did not advance								
Aporosa Boginisoko	86 kg	Bye	Vismara (ITA); L Ippon	Did not advance							

Women

Athlete	Event	Round of 32	Round of 16	Quarterfinals	Semifinals	Repechage			Final	
Athlete	Event	Round of 32	Round of 16	Quarterfinals	Semifinals	Round 1	Round 2	Round 3	Final	
Athlete	Event	Opposition Result	Opposition Result	Opposition Result	Opposition Result	Opposition Result	Opposition Result	Opposition Result	Opposition Result	Rank
Laisa Laveti	66 kg	Bye	Lecat (FRA); L Hansoku-make	Did not advance						
Asenaca Lesivakaruakitotoiya	72 kg	Bye	Werbrouck (BEL); L Ippon	Did not advance						

== Sailing ==
Men

Athlete	Event	Race										Net points	Final rank
Athlete	Event	1	2	3	4	5	6	7	8	9	10	Net points	Final rank
Tony Philp	Lechner A-390	0	~~31~~	16	21	15	3	15	23	29	28	150	10

Match racing

Athlete	Event	Qualification races						Total	Rank
Athlete	Event	1	2	3	4	5	6	Total	Rank
Colin Dunlop; Colin Philp Sr. David Philp	Soling	29	29	26	29	~~30~~	28	141	23

== Swimming ==
Men

Athlete	Event	Heats		Final A/B	
Athlete	Event	Time	Rank	Time	Rank
Foy Gordon Chung	50 metre freestyle	28.75	70	Did not advance	
Foy Gordon Chung	100 metre freestyle	1:03.96	73	Did not advance	
Foy Gordon Chung	100 metre breaststroke	1:13.51	54	Did not advance	
Foy Gordon Chung	200 metre breaststroke	2:41.10	50	Did not advance	
Carl Probert	50 metre freestyle	26.31	65	Did not advance	
Carl Probert	100 metre freestyle	57.25	71	Did not advance	
Carl Probert	200 metre freestyle	2:04.52	50	Did not advance	
Carl Probert	100 metre backstroke	1:04.92	50	Did not advance	
Carl Probert	200 metre backstroke	2:22.54	42	Did not advance	
Carl Probert	100 metre butterfly	1:04.10	68	Did not advance	
Carl Probert	200 metre individual medley	2:22.09	48	Did not advance	

Women

Athlete	Event	Heats		Final A/B	
Athlete	Event	Time	Rank	Time	Rank
Sharon Pickering	50 metre freestyle	28.90	47	Did not advance	
Sharon Pickering	100 metre freestyle	1:01.42	45	Did not advance	
Sharon Pickering	200 metre freestyle	2:12.43	34	Did not advance	
Sharon Pickering	100 metre butterfly	1:06.35	45	Did not advance	
Sharon Pickering	200 metre individual medley	2:30.11	40	Did not advance	
