= Fiji at the 2008 Summer Olympics =

- IOC code: FIJ
- NOC: Fiji Association of Sports and National Olympic Committee
- Website: www.fasanoc.org.fj

in Beijing
- Competitors: 6 in 5 sports
- Flag bearers: Makelesi Bulikiobo (opening); Carl Probert (closing)
- Medals: Gold 0 Silver 0 Bronze 0 Total 0

Summer Olympics appearances (overview)
- 1956; 1960; 1964; 1968; 1972; 1976; 1980; 1984; 1988; 1992; 1996; 2000; 2004; 2008; 2012; 2016; 2020; 2024; 2028

Fiji sent a team to compete in the 2008 Summer Olympics in Beijing, China. The country's flagbearer during the Games' opening ceremony was female sprinter Makelesi Bulikiobo. Fiji was represented by a total of six athletes.

== Athletics ==
Men

Athlete	Event	Heat		Semifinal		Final	
Athlete	Event	Result	Rank	Result	Rank	Result	Rank
Niko Verekauta	400 m	46.32 SB	4	Did not advance			

Women

Athlete	Event	Heat		Semifinal		Final	
Athlete	Event	Result	Rank	Result	Rank	Result	Rank
Makelesi Bulikiobo	400 m	52.24 SB	5	Did not advance			

Key

- Note–Ranks given for track events are within the athlete's heat only
- Q = Qualified for the next round
- q = Qualified for the next round as a fastest loser or, in field events, by position without achieving the qualifying target
- NR = National record
- N/A = Round not applicable for the event
- Bye = Athlete not required to compete in round

== Judo ==
Fiji had received a berth in judo.

Athlete	Event	Round of 32	Round of 16	Quarterfinals	Semifinals	Repechage 1	Repechage 2	Repechage 3	Final / BM	
Athlete	Event	Opposition Result	Opposition Result	Opposition Result	Opposition Result	Opposition Result	Opposition Result	Opposition Result	Opposition Result	Rank
Sisilia Nasiga	−70 kg	Bosch (NED); L 0000–1000	Did not advance			Ouerdane (ALG); L 0000–1001	Did not advance			

== Shooting ==
Glenn Kable represented Fiji in shooting.

Men

Athlete	Event	Qualification		Final	
Athlete	Event	Points	Rank	Points	Rank
Glenn Kable	Trap	115	13	Did not advance	

== Swimming ==
Two of Fiji's top swimmers, Caroline Pickering Puamau and Rachel Ah Koy, declined to seek qualification, leaving Carl Probert as the only Fiji Islander swimmer seeking to qualify for the 2008 Games. Probert, who has taken part in every Summer Olympics since 1992, subsequently qualified for the Beijing Games.

Men

Athlete	Event	Heat		Semifinal		Final	
Athlete	Event	Time	Rank	Time	Rank	Time	Rank
Carl Probert	100 m freestyle	52.37	58	Did not advance			

== Weightlifting ==
Athlete	Event	Snatch		Clean & Jerk		Total	Rank
Athlete	Event	Result	Rank	Result	Rank	Total	Rank
Josefa Vueti	Men's −77 kg	124	26	155	23	279	23

== See also ==
- Fiji at the 2008 Summer Paralympics
