= Fiji at the 1956 Summer Olympics =

- IOC code: FIJ
- NOC: Fiji Association of Sports and National Olympic Committee

in Melbourne/Stockholm
- Competitors: 4 in 3 sports
- Flag bearer: Mesulame Rakuro
- Medals: Gold 0 Silver 0 Bronze 0 Total 0

Summer Olympics appearances (overview)
- 1956; 1960; 1964; 1968; 1972; 1976; 1980; 1984; 1988; 1992; 1996; 2000; 2004; 2008; 2012; 2016; 2020; 2024; 2028

Fiji competed in the Summer Olympic Games for the first time at the 1956 Summer Olympics in Melbourne, Australia.

== Athletics ==
Athlete	Event	Qualification		Final	
Athlete	Event	Distance	Position	Distance	Position
Mesulame Rakuro	Men's discus throw	48.21	8 Q	47.24	15

== Boxing ==
Athlete	Event	Round of 32	Round of 16	Quarterfinals	Semifinals	Final	
Athlete	Event	Opposition Result	Opposition Result	Opposition Result	Opposition Result	Opposition Result	Rank
Thomas Schuster	Light welterweight	Roth (EUA); L	did not advance				
Hector Hatch	Welterweight	Linca (ROU); L	did not advance				

== Sailing ==
Athlete	Event	Race							Total	
Athlete	Event	1	2	3	4	5	6	7	Net points	Rank
Nesbit Bentley	Finn	~~DNF~~	19	18	18	16	18	17	934	20
