= Shooting at the 2003 South Pacific Games =

Shooting competition

- Venue: Royal Fiji Military Forces Shooting Range
- Location: Vatuwaqa in Suva, Fiji
- Dates: 8–11 July 2003

Shooting at the 2003 South Pacific Games was held from 8–11 July at the Royal Fiji Military Forces Shooting Range at Vatuwaqa in Suva, Fiji. The competition was postponed for four days from the original schedule due to high winds at the venue. Tahiti and Fiji were the most successful gold medal-winning nations, winning four and two respectively.

== Teams ==
There were six nations competing:

- Fiji
- New Caledonia
- Niue
- Norfolk Island
- Samoa
- Tahiti

== Medal summary ==
=== Medal table ===
* Host nation (Fiji)

| Rank | Nation | Gold | Silver | Bronze | Total |
|---|---|---|---|---|---|
| 1 | Tahiti | 4 | 0 | 2 | 6 |
| 2 | Fiji* | 2 | 1 | 0 | 3 |
| 3 | Norfolk Island | 0 | 2 | 2 | 4 |
| 4 | Samoa | 0 | 2 | 0 | 2 |
| 5 | New Caledonia | 0 | 1 | 2 | 3 |
| Totals (5 entries) | | 6 | 6 | 6 | 18 |

=== Shotgun results ===
Three down-the-line clay target disciplines were contested and medals were awarded for both individual and team events. The competition was not gender specific, with all events open to men and women. However, all shooters at these games were male.

| Event | Gold | | Silver | | Bronze | | Ref |
|---|---|---|---|---|---|---|---|
| Double barrel – individual | Glenn Kable (FIJ) | 100 | Rob Maskell (SAM) | 98 | Gino Mourin (TAH) | 97 | |
| Double barrel – team | Tahiti (TAH): Gino Mourin; Jean-Hiro Pratx; Hubert Yu Tsien | 285 | Norfolk Island (NFI): Cinton Judd; Milton Bradley; Andrew Barnett | 284 | New Caledonia (NCL): Pascal Marle; Theodore Tein-Weiawe; Mario Cugola | 275 | |
| Single barrel – individual | Gino Mourin (TAH) | 97 | Glenn Kable (FIJ) | 96 | Basil Vercoe (NFI) | 87 | |
| Single barrel – team | Tahiti (TAH): Gino Mourin; Jean-Hiro Pratx; Hubert Yu Tsien | 258 | Norfolk Island (NFI): Basil Vercoe; Cinton Judd; Andrew Barnett | 253 | New Caledonia (NCL): Philippe Lepigeon; Karl Barrere; Marcel Gavaldon | 246 | |
| Ball trap – individual | Glenn Kable (FIJ) | 109 | Rob Maskell (SAM) | 109 | Gino Mourin (TAH) | 99 | |
| Ball trap – team | Tahiti (TAH): Gino Mourin; Jean-Hiro Pratx; Hubert Yu Tsien | 219 | New Caledonia (NCL): Theodore Tein-Weiawe; Mario Cugola; Pascal Marle | 206 | Norfolk Island (NFI): Milton Bradley; Cinton Judd; Basil Vercoe | 206 | |
