= Shooting at the 2007 South Pacific Games =

Shooting competition

- Venue: Tafaigata Shooting Range
- Location: Apia, Samoa
- Dates: 27–29 August 2007

Shooting at the 2007 South Pacific Games was held in Samoa from 27–29 August at the Tafaigata Shooting Range near Apia. All medal event took place on the down-the-line shotgun range, although a pistol shooting demonstration event was also hosted.

Led by Theodore Tein-Weiawe, the New Caledonian team dominated the competition and won five gold medals. Fiji also won a gold medal with Glenn Kable taking individual honours in the single barrel event.

== Teams ==
There were six nations competing:

- Fiji
- New Caledonia
- Niue
- Norfolk Island
- Samoa
- Tahiti

== Medal summary ==
=== Medal table ===
* Host nation (Samoa)

Rank	Nation	Gold	Silver	Bronze	Total
1	New Caledonia	5	1	0	6
2	Fiji	1	2	2	5
3	Tahiti	0	2	3	5
4	Norfolk Island	0	1	0	1
5	Samoa*	0	0	1	1
Totals (5 entries)		6	6	6	18

=== Shotgun results ===
Three down-the-line clay target disciplines were contested and medals were awarded for both individual and team events. The competition was not gender specific, with all events open to men and women. However, all shooters at these games were male.

Event	Gold		Silver		Bronze		Ref
Double barrel – individual	Theo Tein-Weiawe (NCL)	99	Gino Mourin (TAH)	99	Glenn Kable (FIJ)	98	
Double barrel – team	New Caledonia (NCL): Fabrice Azzaro; Walter Lepironnec; Philippe Simoni; Theodore Tein-Weiawe	291	Tahiti (TAH): Gino Mourin; Jean-Hiro Pratx; Alain Timiona; Joseph Toth	289	Fiji (FIJ): David Evans; Jerad Frost; Glenn Kable; Errol Somaru	286	
Single barrel – individual	Glenn Kable (FIJ)	95	Theo Tein-Weiawe (NCL)	94	Orlando Seumanutafa (SAM)	92	
Single barrel – team	New Caledonia (NCL): Fabrice Azzaro; Walter Lepironnec; Philippe Simoni; Theodore Tein-Weiawe	263	Fiji (FIJ): David Evans; Jerad Frost; Glenn Kable; Errol Somaru	262	Tahiti (TAH): Gino Mourin; Jean-Hiro Pratx; Alain Timiona; Joseph Toth	259	
Points score – individual	Theo Tein-Weiawe (NCL)	287	Glenn Kable (FIJ)	286	Gino Mourin (TAH)	285	
Points score – team	New Caledonia (NCL): Fabrice Azzaro; Walter Lepironnec; Philippe Simoni; Theodore Tein-Weiawe	832	Norfolk Island (NFI): Andrew Barnett; Judd Clinton; Brian O'Connor; Brian Vercoe	826	Tahiti (TAH): Gino Mourin; Jean-Hiro Pratx; Alain Timiona; Joseph Toth	810	
