= Fiji at the 2012 Summer Olympics =

- IOC code: FIJ
- NOC: Fiji Association of Sports and National Olympic Committee
- Website: www.fasanoc.org.fj

in London
- Competitors: 9 in 6 sports
- Flag bearers: Josateki Naulu (opening); Leslie Copeland (closing)
- Officials: 14
- Medals: Gold 0 Silver 0 Bronze 0 Total 0

Summer Olympics appearances (overview)
- 1956; 1960; 1964; 1968; 1972; 1976; 1980; 1984; 1988; 1992; 1996; 2000; 2004; 2008; 2012; 2016; 2020; 2024

Fiji competed at the 2012 Summer Olympics in London, United Kingdom from July 27 to August 12, 2012. This was the nation's thirteenth appearance at the Olympics, having appeared at every games since 1956 except the 1964 Summer Olympics in Tokyo, and the 1980 Summer Olympics in Moscow due to its support for the American-led boycott.

Fiji Association of Sports and National Olympic Committee sent a total of 9 athletes to the Games (6 men and 3 women) to compete in 6 sports. Among these athletes, trap shooter Glenn Kable, the oldest of the team, at age 49, and archer Robert Elder, after his eight-year absence, competed at their second Olympic games. Judoka and current Oceanic champion Josateki Naulu was the nation's first male flag bearer at the opening ceremony since 2000. Fiji, however, had to wait four more years for its first Olympic medal.

== Archery ==
Fiji has qualified one male archer by being the second-ranked country at the 2012 Open New Zealand Championships, which doubled as the 2012 Oceanian Championships. Former Olympic athlete Robert Elder was chosen to represent Fiji. During the ranking round, Elder finished in penultimate place, out of 64 archers; therefore, he competed against South Korea's Kim Bub-Min, who placed in second. Elder almost pulled off the upset to win two of the first four sets, but he was unable to score a 10 with his final arrow during the last set, which guaranteed him a spot for the next elimination round.

Athlete	Event	Ranking round		Round of 64	Round of 32	Round of 16	Quarterfinals	Semifinals	Final / BM	
Athlete	Event	Score	Seed	Opposition Score	Opposition Score	Opposition Score	Opposition Score	Opposition Score	Opposition Score	Rank
Robert Elder	Men's individual	615	63	Kim B-M (KOR); L 4–6	did not advance					

== Athletics ==
Fiji selected two athletes in the track and field after having achieved qualifying standards in their respective events (up to a maximum of 3 athletes in each event at the 'A' Standard, and 1 at the 'B' Standard): Javelin thrower Leslie Copeland guaranteed a qualifying place at the Olympics, after achieving the B-standard at the 2011 Summer Universiade Games. During the Olympics, Copeland was able to throw past several strong competitors including Latvia's Vadims Vasiljevskis, an Olympic bronze medalist in Athens. However, his throw was not sufficiently enough to advance him into the finals, finishing only in thirteenth place. Danielle Alakija, on the other hand, competed at the Olympics by a wild card. She finished sixth during the heats in the women's 400 m, which seemed farther enough to advance her into the semi-finals.

Key

- Note–Ranks given for track events are within the athlete's heat only
- Q = Qualified for the next round
- q = Qualified for the next round as a fastest loser or, in field events, by position without achieving the qualifying target
- NR = National record
- N/A = Round not applicable for the event
- Bye = Athlete not required to compete in round

Men

Athlete	Event	Qualification		Final	
Athlete	Event	Distance	Position	Distance	Position
Leslie Copeland	Javelin throw	80.19 SB	13	did not advance	

Women

Athlete	Event	Heat		Semifinal		Final	
Athlete	Event	Result	Rank	Result	Rank	Result	Rank
Danielle Alakija	400 m	56.77	6	did not advance			

== Judo ==
Fiji's Josateki Naulu was given a continental spot for being one of the highest ranked Oceania athletes, who have not yet qualified.

Athlete	Event	Round of 64	Round of 32	Round of 16	Quarterfinals	Semifinals	Repechage	Final / BM	
Athlete	Event	Opposition Result	Opposition Result	Opposition Result	Opposition Result	Opposition Result	Opposition Result	Opposition Result	Rank
Josateki Naulu	Men's −81 kg	Bye	Mrvaljević (MNE); L 0003–0111	did not advance					

== Shooting ==
Fiji has qualified a single quota place from the 2011 Oceania Shooting Championships by winning the men's trap event. Glenn Kable, being the oldest member of the delegation, was chosen to represent Fiji. He was considered to be the nation's top medal prospect, although he failed to reach the final round. Kable finished only twenty-third out of 34 competitors, as a rain delay during the second round perceived him to lose his concentration.

Men

Athlete	Event	Qualification		Final	
Athlete	Event	Points	Rank	Points	Rank
Glenn Kable	Trap	117	23	did not advance	

== Swimming ==
Fiji qualified a man and a woman through FINA's universality places, where Paul Elaisa and Matelita Buadromo were selected. A controversy had taken place in the choice of the male swimmer as Douglas Miller earned his spot to qualify at the Olympics. Paul Elaisa, however, appealed his choice to join the team. Neither of these swimmers advance into the semi-finals.

Men

Athlete	Event	Heat		Semifinal		Final	
Athlete	Event	Time	Rank	Time	Rank	Time	Rank
Paul Elaisa	100 m freestyle	54.87	47	did not advance			

Women

Athlete	Event	Heat		Semifinal		Final	
Athlete	Event	Time	Rank	Time	Rank	Time	Rank
Matelita Buadromo	100 m breaststroke	1:16.33	43	did not advance			

== Weightlifting ==
Fiji has qualified two places for one man and one woman after competing at the 2012 Oceania Weightlifting Championships

Athlete	Event	Snatch		Clean & Jerk		Total	Rank
Athlete	Event	Result	Rank	Result	Rank	Total	Rank
Manueli Tulo	Men's −56 kg	105	14	128	12	233	11
Maria Liku	Women's −63 kg	82	5	100	5	182	5
