= Fiji at the 1976 Summer Olympics =

- IOC code: FIJ
- NOC: Fiji Association of Sports and National Olympic Committee

in Montreal
- Competitors: 2 in 1 sport
- Flag bearer: Miriama Tuisorisori-Chambault
- Medals: Gold 0 Silver 0 Bronze 0 Total 0

Summer Olympics appearances (overview)
- 1956; 1960; 1964; 1968; 1972; 1976; 1980; 1984; 1988; 1992; 1996; 2000; 2004; 2008; 2012; 2016; 2020; 2024

Fiji sent a delegation to compete at the 1976 Summer Olympics in Montreal, Quebec, Canada, from 17 July to 1 August 1976. This was the nation's fifth appearance at a Summer Olympic Games. Their first appearance was at the 1956 Summer Olympics in Melbourne, Australia. Fiji's delegation consisted of two competitors. Tony Moore who made it to the quarter-finals of the 200m sprint and round 1 in the 100m sprint. After not starting in the 400m sprint, he only made the qualification stage of the long jump. The other athlete was Miriama Tuisorisori-Chambault who competed in the women's pentathlon and long jump. She finished 18th overall in the pentathlon and 27th in qualifying for the long jump. She would not start in the 100m hurdles.

== Background ==
The Fiji Association of Sports and National Olympic Committee (FASNOC) was recognized by the International Olympic Committee on 1 January 1955. The following year the country debuted at the 1956 Summer Olympics held in Melbourne, Australia, with five athletes competing in three different sports. After competing in the following games in 1960, they missed the subsequent edition before returning for the 1968 Summer Olympics held in Mexico City and the following edition before the Olympics in 1976. The 1976 Summer Olympics were held in Montreal, Quebec, Canada from 17 July to 1 August 1976; a total of 6,084 athletes representing 92 National Olympic Committees took part. Fiji sent two athletes to Montreal, Tony Moore and Miriama Tuisorisori-Chambault who was also the flag bearer for Fiji. They competed in five events throughout the games (as both of them were in their respective long jump events) with both of them not starting in an event.

== Athletics ==
Tony Moore was 24 years old at the time of the 1976 Summer Olympics, competing in his only Olympics. He competed in the men's 100 metres on 23 July where in heat nine he finished last with a time of 11.16 seconds. Two days later on 25 July, he competed in the heats of the men's 200 metres finishing in fourth place in the sixth heat. In the quarter-finals he competed in the third quarter final. He would go on to finish in seventh place in his heat being almost six tenths ahead of last place runner, Abdul Aziz Abdul Kareem from Kuwait. After not starting the 400 meters event on 26 July, his final event was the long jump with qualifying being held on 28 July. In his qualifying group he finished in 15th place in Group B and 31st overall with a jump of 6.81 metres.

The other athlete who competed for Fiji was Miriama Tuisorisori-Chambault who competed in her first of two Olympic Games. Her first event was on 23 July in the preliminaries of the women's long jump. She finished in 14th place in her qualifying group and 27th overall with a jump of 5.79 metres. Two days later, she competed in the women's pentathlon which included five athletic disciplines held over two days. Her best result over the two days was in the 200 metres where she finished 13th with a time of 24.89. Her other results in the pentathlon was 19th (100m hurdles), 20th (Shot put), 20th (high jump) and 15th (long jump) to finish 18th overall with 3,827 points. On 28 July, she was entered for the 100 metres hurdles but she did not start.

Track & road events

Athletes	Events	Heat		Quarter finals		Semi finals		Final	
Athletes	Events	Time	Rank	Time	Rank	Time	Rank	Time	Rank
Tony Moore	Men's 100 m	11.16	7	Did Not Advance					
Tony Moore	Men's 200 m	21.82	4 Q	21.75	7	Did Not Advance			
Tony Moore	Men's 400 m	Did Not Start							
Miriama Tuisorisori-Chambault	Women's 100 m hurdles	Did Not Start							

Field events

Athletes	Events	Qualification		Final	
Athletes	Events	Distance	Position	Distance	Position
Tony Moore	Men's long jump	6.81	15	Did Not Advance	
Miriama Tuisorisori-Chambault	Women's long jump	5.79	27	Did Not Advance	

Combined events – Women's pentathlon

Athlete	Event	100mh	SP	HJ	LJ	200m	Points	Rank
Miriama Tuisorisori-Chambault	Result	14.78	9.38	1.55	5.84	24.89	3827	18
Miriama Tuisorisori-Chambault	Rank	19	20	20	15	13	3827	18

== See also ==
- Fiji at the 1976 Summer Paralympics
