= Fiji at the 1968 Summer Olympics =

- IOC code: FIJ
- NOC: Fiji Association of Sports and National Olympic Committee

in Mexico City
- Competitors: 1 in 1 sport
- Flag bearer: Viliame Liga
- Medals: Gold 0 Silver 0 Bronze 0 Total 0

Summer Olympics appearances (overview)
- 1956; 1960; 1964; 1968; 1972; 1976; 1980; 1984; 1988; 1992; 1996; 2000; 2004; 2008; 2012; 2016; 2020; 2024

Fiji competed with only one person at the 1968 Summer Olympics in Mexico City, Mexico. Fiji returned to the Summer Olympic Games after missing the 1964 Summer Olympics in Tokyo.

== Athletics ==
Athlete	Event	Qualification		Final	
Athlete	Event	Distance	Position	Distance	Position
Viliame Liga	Men's javelin throw	62.32	25	did not advance	
