= Qoro =

Qoro is a Fijian surname. Notable people with the surname include:

- Gabrieli Qoro (born 1970), Fijian athlete
- Manasa Qoro (1964–2019), Fijian rugby union player
- Mor Yulios Elias Qoro (1881–1962), Turkish bishop
- Sivia Qoro, Fijian politician
