= Fiji at the 1960 Summer Olympics =

- IOC code: FIJ (FIG used at these Games)
- NOC: Fiji Association of Sports and National Olympic Committee

in Rome
- Competitors: 2
- Flag bearer: Mesulame Rakuro
- Medals: Gold 0 Silver 0 Bronze 0 Total 0

Summer Olympics appearances (overview)
- 1956; 1960; 1964; 1968; 1972; 1976; 1980; 1984; 1988; 1992; 1996; 2000; 2004; 2008; 2012; 2016; 2020; 2024

Fiji competed at the 1960 Summer Olympics in Rome, Italy.

== Athletics ==
=== Track and road ===
Athlete	Event	Heat		Quarterfinal		Semifinal		Final	
Athlete	Event	Result	Rank	Result	Rank	Result	Rank	Result	Rank
Sitiveni Moceidreke	Men's 100 m	10.8	3 Q	10.7	7	did not advance			
Sitiveni Moceidreke	Men's 200 m	21.8	4	did not advance					

=== Field ===
Athlete	Event	Qualification		Final	
Athlete	Event	Result	Rank	Result	Rank
Mesulame Rakuro	Men's discus throw	47.18	32	did not advance	
