= Harry Apted =

Fijian cricketer

Harry Joseph Apted
Personal information
- Full name: Harry Joseph Apted
- Born: 30 April 1925; Suva, Fiji
- Died: 8 April 2016 (aged 90); Suva, Fiji
- Batting: Left-handed
- Bowling: Left-arm orthodox

International information
- National side: Fiji

Career statistics
Competition	FC
Matches	9
Runs scored	497
Batting average	27.61
100s/50s	–/4
Top score	97
Balls bowled	211
Wickets	5
Bowling average	27.80
5 wickets in innings	–
10 wickets in match	–
Best bowling	2/36
Catches/stumpings	19/–
- Source: Cricinfo, 13 March 2010

Harry Joseph Apted (30 April 1925 – 8 April 2016) was a Fijian cricketer. He was a left-handed batsman who bowled slow left arm orthodox.

Apted made his first-class debut for Fiji in 1948 against Auckland during Fiji's tour of New Zealand. From 1948 to 1954 he played 9 first-class matches for Fiji, with his final first-class appearance coming against Auckland during Fiji's 1953/54 tour of New Zealand.

In his 9 first-class matches for Fiji he scored 497 runs at a batting average of 27.61, with four half centuries and a high score of 97 against Auckland in 1948. With the ball he took 5 wickets at a bowling average of 27.80, with best figures of 2/36. In the field he took 19 catches for Fiji.

Apted also represented Fiji in 76 non first-class matches from 1948 to 1968, including a match against the touring West Indians. Apted's final match for Fiji came in 1968 against Northland.

In 2008, Apted was inducted into the Fiji Sports Hall of Fame. He died in April 2016.
