= Josefa Levula =

Fijian track and rugby athlete

Jo Levula
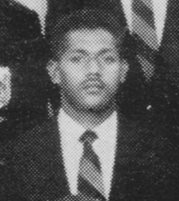

Personal information
- Full name: Josefa Vuniyayawa Levula
- Born: 15 June 1930 Nadi, Fiji
- Died: 2 July 1989 (aged 59) Rochdale, England

Playing information
- Height: 1.94 m (6 ft 4 in)
- Weight: 105 kg (16 st 7 lb; 231 lb)

Rugby union
- Position: Wing
Representative
Years	Team	Pld	T	G	FG	P
1951–61	Fiji	17	8	3	0	32

Rugby league
Club
Years	Team	Pld	T	G	FG	P
1961–64	Rochdale Hornets	80	37	?	?	207
1964–?	Bradford Northern	?	?	?	?	?
	Total
- Sports career
- Country: Fiji
- Sport: Athletics
- Events: 100-yard dash, 220 yard dash

Sports achievements and titles
- Personal best: 100-yard dash: 9.72s (NR)
Medal record
Men's athletics
Representing Fiji
Australian Championships
Silver medal – second place	1954 Australia	100 yard
Bronze medal – third place	1954 Australia	220 yard
- Updated on 17 June 2015

Josefa Vuniyayawa Levula (15 June 1930 – 2 July 1989), known as "Jo" or "Joe", was a Fijian track athlete, and rugby union and professional rugby league footballer. He represented the Fijian national rugby union team before turning professional with the Rochdale Hornets and Bradford Northern in England. He primarily played on the wing.

Levula earned the nickname "The Flying Fijian", which went on to become the nickname of the Fiji national rugby union team.

== Career ==
=== Rugby union ===
Levula, who had an unorthodox high knee action and his exceptionally long strides represented Fiji in the 1960s. In 1951, over 3000 fans came to Buckhurst Park to see the final between Suva and the Northern District. Levula scored four tries to end Suva’s 10 year hold on the trophy.

He was selected in the Fiji to tour New Zealand. He made his début for Fiji at fly-half and he scored a brace of tries against the Māori All Blacks to beat them 21–14 for which he received a New Zealand Rugby honour of being nominated as ‘Player of the Year'. In August 1952, he was on the wing for Fiji when they created history by beating Australia.

=== Athletics ===
He joined the Athletics Fiji team in 1954 to take part in the Australian Athletics Championships. He finished 2nd in the 100-yard dash behind Hector Hogan.

=== Rugby league ===
In 1961, he defied the FRU when he left rugby union and went to England to join the Rochdale Hornets rugby league team with fellow Fijian Orisi Dawai, and later joined by Fijians Voate Drui and Laitia Ravouvou. Levula transferred to Bradford Northern in 1964.

He was inducted into the Fiji Sports Hall of Fame in 1990.
