= Fiji at the 2000 Summer Olympics =

- IOC code: FIJ
- NOC: Fiji Association of Sports and National Olympic Committee
- Website: www.fasanoc.org.fj

in Sydney
- Flag bearer: Tony Philp
- Medals: Gold 0 Silver 0 Bronze 0 Total 0

Summer Olympics appearances (overview)
- 1956; 1960; 1964; 1968; 1972; 1976; 1980; 1984; 1988; 1992; 1996; 2000; 2004; 2008; 2012; 2016; 2020; 2024; 2028

Fiji competed at the 2000 Summer Olympics in Sydney, Australia.

== Athletics ==
Key

- Note–Ranks given for track events are within the athlete's heat only
- Q = Qualified for the next round by position in race or, in field events, by achieving the automatic qualification target
- q = Qualified for the next round as a fastest loser or, in field events, by position without achieving the qualifying target

Athlete	Event	Heat		Quarterfinal		Semifinal		Final	
Athlete	Event	Time	Rank	Time	Rank	Time	Rank	Time	Rank
Isireli Naikelekelevesi	Men's 800 m	1:49.61	7	—N/a		Did not advance			

== Judo ==
Athlete	Event	First round	Round of 32	Round of 16	Quarterfinal	Semifinal	Repechage 1	Repechage 2	Repechage 3	Repechage 4	Final / BM	
Athlete	Event	Opposition Result	Opposition Result	Opposition Result	Opposition Result	Opposition Result	Opposition Result	Opposition Result	Opposition Result	Opposition Result	Opposition Result	Rank
Nacanieli Qerewaqa	Men's +100 kg	—N/a	Sánchez (CUB); L 0000–1000	Did not advance								

== Sailing ==
Athlete	Event	Race											Net points	Rank
Athlete	Event	1	2	3	4	5	6	7	8	9	10	11	Net points	Rank
Tony Philp	Men's Mistral	17	11	3	21	~~33~~	13	~~22~~	3	2	12	6	88	10

== Swimming ==
Men

Athlete	Event	Heat		Semifinal		Final	
Athlete	Event	Time	Rank	Time	Rank	Time	Rank
Carl Probert	100 m freestyle	51.34	36	Did not advance			
Carl Probert	200 m freestyle	1:54.98	45	Did not advance			

Women

Athlete	Event	Heat		Semifinal		Final	
Athlete	Event	Time	Rank	Time	Rank	Time	Rank
Caroline Pickering	50 m freestyle	26.57	35	Did not advance			
Caroline Pickering	100 m freestyle	58.62	38	Did not advance			

== Weightlifting ==
Athlete	Event	Snatch			Clean & Jerk			Total	Rank
Athlete	Event	1	2	3	1	2	3	Total	Rank
Kesaia Tawai	Women's 63 kg	~~75.0~~	~~75.0~~	75.0	90.0	~~95.0~~	~~95.0~~	165.0	9

== See also ==
- Fiji at the 2000 Summer Paralympics
