= Carl Probert =

Fijian swimmer (born 1975)

Carl Probert OLY
Personal information
- Full name: Carl Harvie Probert
- Nationality: Fiji
- Born: 13 September 1975 (age 50) Suva, Rewa, Fiji

Sport
- Sport: Swimming
Medal record
Pacific Games
| Bronze medal – third place | Nouméa 2011 | 4x100m Freestyle relay |
South Pacific Games
| Gold medal – first place | Suva 2003 | 50m Freestyle |
| Silver medal – second place | Suva 2003 | 100m Freestyle |
| Silver medal – second place | Suva 2003 | 50m Backstroke |

Carl Harvie Probert (born 13 September 1975 in Suva, Rewa, Fiji) is a 5-time Olympic swimmer and National Record holder from Fiji. He swam for Fiji at the 1992, 1996, 2000, 2004 and 2008 Olympics. Probert was the flag bearer for Fiji in the 1992 opening ceremony.

Probert also competed for Fiji at the 1998 Commonwealth Games, 2002 Commonwealth Games, 2006 Commonwealth Games and at the 2007 World Aquatics Championships.

He has been a student at the University of Sydney.

In 2008, Probert qualified to compete at the 2008 Summer Olympics in Beijing. He has not won an Olympic medal. Probert was the only Fiji Islander seeking qualification, as both Caroline Pickering and Rachel Ah Koy announced they would not taking part in the Games.
