= Fiji at the 1972 Summer Olympics =

- IOC code: FIJ
- NOC: Fiji Association of Sports and National Olympic Committee

in Munich
- Competitors: 2 in 1 sport
- Flag bearer: Usaia Sotutu
- Medals: Gold 0 Silver 0 Bronze 0 Total 0

Summer Olympics appearances (overview)
- 1956; 1960; 1964; 1968; 1972; 1976; 1980; 1984; 1988; 1992; 1996; 2000; 2004; 2008; 2012; 2016; 2020; 2024

Fiji competed at the 1972 Summer Olympics in Munich, West Germany. No medals were won by Fiji.

== Athletics ==
Key

- Note–Ranks given for track events are within the athlete's heat only
- Q = Qualified for the next round
- q = Qualified for the next round as a fastest loser or, in field events, by position without achieving the qualifying target
- NR = National record
- N/A = Round not applicable for the event
- Bye = Athlete not required to compete in round

Track & road events

Athlete	Event	Heats		Quarterfinal		Semifinal		Final	
Athlete	Event	Result	Rank	Result	Rank	Result	Rank	Result	Rank
Usaia Sotutu	Men's 5000 m	15:24.2	13	—N/a				did not advance	
Usaia Sotutu	Men's 10000 m	DNF		—N/a				did not advance	
Usaia Sotutu	Men's 3000 m steeple	9:12.0	12	—N/a				did not advance	
Samuela Yavala	Men's 400 m	47.76	6	did not advance					
