= Danielle Alakija =

British-born Fijian athlete (born 1996)

Personal information
- Full name: Danielle Remilekun B. Alakija
- Born: 3 May 1996 (age 30) Hillingdon, London, England
- Height: 1.86 m (6 ft 1 in)
- Weight: 71 kg (157 lb)

Sport
- Country: Fiji
- Sport: Athletics
- Event: 400 metres
- Coached by: Maurice Greene
Medal record
Women's Athletics
Representing Fiji
Pacific Games
| Silver medal – second place | 2011 Nouméa | 4x400m Relay |
- Updated on 27 April 2013

Danielle Remilekum B. Alakija, also known simply as Danni Alakija (born 3 May 1996) is a British-born Fijian athlete of Nigerian descent. She trains in the United States and was part of the silver medal-winning 4 × 400 m relay team at the 2011 Pacific Games. She was selected to compete for Fiji at the 2012 Summer Olympics, and was the Olympic's youngest track and field competitor.

== Achievements ==
| Year | Competition | Venue | Position | Event | Notes |
Representing Fiji
| 2011 | Pacific Games | Nouméa, New Caledonia | 2nd | 4 × 400 m relay | 3:51.69 min |
