= Tony Moore (athlete) =

Fijian long jumper

Tony Moore (born 14 December 1951) is an Olympic long jumper who competed for the Fiji Olympic Team in the 1976 Montreal Olympic Games. In 2009, Moore was inducted into the Fiji Sports Hall of Fame.

Moore is also a poet, with works exhibited by the Art of the Olympians.
