= Fiji at the 1996 Summer Olympics =

- IOC code: FIJ
- NOC: Fiji Association of Sports and National Olympic Committee
- Website: www.fasanoc.org.fj

in Atlanta
- Competitors: 17
- Flag bearer: Jone Delai
- Medals: Gold 0 Silver 0 Bronze 0 Total 0

Summer Olympics appearances (overview)
- 1956; 1960; 1964; 1968; 1972; 1976; 1980; 1984; 1988; 1992; 1996; 2000; 2004; 2008; 2012; 2016; 2020; 2024

Fiji competed at the 1996 Summer Olympics in Atlanta, United States.

== Results by event ==
=== Athletics ===
Men's 4 × 400 m Relay

- Soloveni Nakaunicina, Henry Semiti, Solomone Bole, and Isireli Naikelekelevesi
  - Heat — 3:10.67 (→ did not advance)

=== Judo ===
- Nacanieli Qerewaqa - ?

=== Weightlifting ===
Men's Light-Heavyweight

- Rupeni Varea
  - Final — 115.0 + 150.0 = 265.0 (→ 17th place)

== See also ==
- Fiji at the 1996 Summer Paralympics
