= Albert Miller (athlete) =

Fijian decathlete

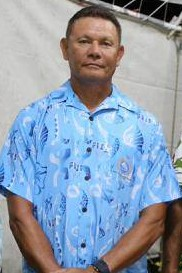
- Miller at an event in April 2014

Personal information
- Born: 12 December 1957 (age 68) Kasavu, Cakaudrove, Fiji
- Height: 1.85 m (6 ft 1 in)
- Weight: 78 kg (172 lb)

Sport
- Country: Fiji
- Sport: Athletics
Medal record
Men's athletics
Representing Fiji
(South) Pacific Games
Gold medal – first place	1991 Port Moresby	decathlon

Albert Barty Miller (born 12 December 1957, in Kasavu, Cakaudrove, Fiji), is a former decathlete and Olympian from Fiji. His personal best 7397 points, also the current national record of Fiji.

== See also ==
- Fiji at the 1984 Summer Olympics
- Fiji at the 1988 Summer Olympics
- Fiji at the 1992 Summer Olympics
