= Ivy Shaw =

Fijian weightlifter

Personal information
- Full name: Asenaca Ivy Shaw
- Born: 21 August 1976 (age 49) Suva, Fiji
- Height: 164 cm (5 ft 5 in)
- Weight: 83.70 kg (184.5 lb)

Sport
- Country: Fiji
- Sport: Weightlifting
- Weight class: +75 kg
Medal record
Women's Weightlifting
Representing Fiji
Oceania Weightlifting Championships
| Silver medal – second place | 2007 Apia | 75kg |
Pacific Games
| Bronze medal – third place | 2007 Apia | 75kg |
| Bronze medal – third place | 2003 Suva | 75kg |
- Updated on 10 October 2016

Asenaca Ivy Shaw also written as Asenaca Iwy Shaw (born 21 August 1976) was a Fijian female weightlifter, competing in the +75 kg category and representing Fiji at international competitions. She is the twin sister of Fijian weightlifting official Della Shaw Elder.

Shaw was born in Suva, Fiji. She won two bronze medals at the 2007 South Pacific Games in Apia. She won three silvers at the Oceania Weightlifting Championships in Samoa.

She participated at the 2004 Summer Olympics in the +75 kg event.

== Major results ==
| Year | Venue | Weight | Snatch (kg) | | | | | Clean & Jerk (kg) | | | | | Total | Rank |
| Year | Venue | Weight | 1 | 2 | 3 | Result | Rank | 1 | 2 | 3 | Result | Rank | Total | Rank |
Representing Fiji
Summer Olympics
| 2004 | Athens, Greece | +75 kg | 80.0 | 85.0 | ~~90.0~~ | 85.0 | 12 | ~~100.0~~ | 100.0 | ~~110.0~~ | 100.0 | 12 | 185.0 | 12 |
Commonwealth Games
| 2006 | Melbourne, Australia | +75 kg | 91 | ~~95~~ | 95 | 95 | 4 | 115 | ~~120~~ | ~~125~~ | 115 | 6 | 210 | 6 |
Pacific Games
| 2007 | Apia, Samoa | +75 kg | —N/a | —N/a | —N/a | 85 | 3rd place, bronze medalist(s) | —N/a | —N/a | —N/a | 117 | 4 | 202 | 3rd place, bronze medalist(s) |
| 2003 | Suva, Fiji | +75 kg | —N/a | —N/a | —N/a | 82.5 | 3rd place, bronze medalist(s) | —N/a | —N/a | —N/a | 102.5 | 4 | 185.0 | (bronze) |
