= Samuela Tupou =

Fijian swimmer

Personal information
- Born: 8 May 1956 (age 70) Suva, Fiji

Sport
- Sport: Swimming

Samuela Tupou (born 8 May 1956) is a Fijian former swimmer. He competed in four events at the 1984 Summer Olympics.
