= Jason Chute =

Fijian swimmer

Personal information
- Born: 12 November 1971 (age 54)

Sport
- Sport: Swimming

Jason Chute (born 12 November 1971) is a Fijian former swimmer. He competed in three events at the 1988 Summer Olympics.
