= Iosefo Masi =

Fijian rugby league & union player

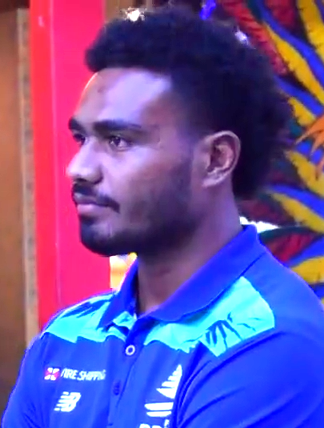
- Masi in 2023
- Full name: Iosefo Masikau Baleiwairiki
- Born: 9 May 1998 (age 28)
- Height: 190 cm (6 ft 3 in)
- Weight: 88 kg (194 lb)
- Notable relative: Filipe Sauturaga (brother)

Rugby union career
- Position: Centre
Senior career
Years	Team	Apps	(Points)
2023–25	Fijian Drua	37	(85)
2025-	Lyon	3	(15)
- Correct as of 3 June 2025
International career
Years	Team	Apps	(Points)
2021	Fiji	8	(20)
- Correct as of 27 October 2024
National sevens team
Years	Team		Comps
2021–2024	Fiji		
- Correct as of 27 July 2021
- Rugby league career

Playing information
- Position: Wing, Centre, Fullback
Club
Years	Team	Pld	T	G	FG	P
2022	North Qld Cowboys	0				0
Medal record
Men's rugby sevens
Representing Fiji
Rugby Sevens World Cup
Gold medal – first place	2022 Cape Town	Team competition
Olympic Games
Gold medal – first place	2020 Tokyo	Team competition
Silver medal – second place	2024 Paris	Team competition

Iosefo Masikau Baleiwairiki also known as either Iosefo Masikau or Iosefo Masi (born 9 May 1998) is a Fijian professional rugby union footballer who currently plays for Lyon in the French Top 14. Known for repeatedly slicing his way through the opposition defensive line has earned him the nickname, the "Slice Man". He signed for Top 14 side Lyon in 2025.

He is a former rugby sevens player, winning a gold medal for Fiji at the 2020 Summer Olympics. He won a gold medal at the 2022 Rugby World Cup Sevens in Cape Town.

== Career ==
=== Rugby Sevens ===
Masi was selected to the national team after his impressive performances at the 2020 Fiji Bitter Marist 7s tournament where he also scored a hat-trick in one of the matches.

Masi made his debut appearance at the Olympic Games in 2020 representing Fiji in the men's rugby sevens tournament. He was part of the Fijian side that won a silver medal at the 2024 Summer Olympics in Paris.

=== Rugby League ===
On 20 September 2021, Masi signed with the Townsville-based North Queensland Cowboys in the National Rugby League (NRL) on a train and replacement contract. He trained with the Cowboys' NRL squad and played with the Townsville Blackhawks in the Queensland Cup in 2022.

=== Rugby Union ===
In 2022, Masi returned to rugby union, joining the Fijian Drua.
