= Viliame Liga =

Fijian javelin thrower

Personal information
- Nationality: Fijian
- Born: 11 June 1932 Cakaudrove
- Died: 1992 (aged 59) Brisbane

Sport
- Country: Fiji
- Sport: Javelin throw

Achievements and titles
- Personal best: 72.08

Viliame Bale Liga (11 June 1932 – 1992) was a Fijian Olympic javelin thrower. He represented his country in the men's javelin throw at the 1968 Summer Olympics. His distance was a 62.32 in the qualifiers.
