= Josateki Naulu =

Fijian judoka

Personal information
- Born: June 8, 1984 (age 42) Suva, Fiji
- Height: 1.75 m (5 ft 9 in)
- Weight: 81 kg (179 lb)

Sport
- Country: Fiji
- Sport: Judo
- Event: -81kg
- Coached by: Nacanieli Qerewaqa
Medal record
Men's Judo
Representing Fiji
Pacific Games
Gold medal – first place	2011 Nouméa	-81 kg
- Updated on 23 July 2012

Josateki Naulu (8 June 1984) is a Fijian judoka who was flag-bearer for Fiji at the 2012 Summer Olympics. In the Men's 81kg event, he lost in the second round.

He earned an IOC scholarship to live and train in Japan.

He competed at the 2016 Summer Olympics in the men's 81 kg event, in which he was eliminated in the second round.
