= Vasiti Solikoviti =

Fijian rugby sevens player (born 1993)

- Born: 2 August 1993 (age 33)
- Height: 1.70 m (5 ft 7 in)
- Weight: 73 kg (161 lb; 11 st 7 lb)

Rugby union career
National sevens team
Years	Team	Comps
- Fiji
Medal record
Representing Fiji
Women's rugby sevens
Olympic Games
Bronze medal – third place	2020 Tokyo	Team competition
Commonwealth Games
Silver medal – second place	2022 Birmingham	Team competition

Vasiti Solikoviti (born 2 August 1993) is a Fijian rugby sevens player. She won a bronze medal at the 2020 Summer Olympics in Tokyo.

== Rugby career ==
Solikoviti competed in the women's sevens tournament at the 2020 Summer Olympics and won a bronze medal at the event.

Solikoviti was part of the Fijiana sevens team that won the silver medal at the 2022 Commonwealth Games in Birmingham. She later featured at the 2022 Rugby World Cup Sevens in Cape Town.
