= Apisai Domolailai =

Fijian rugby union player

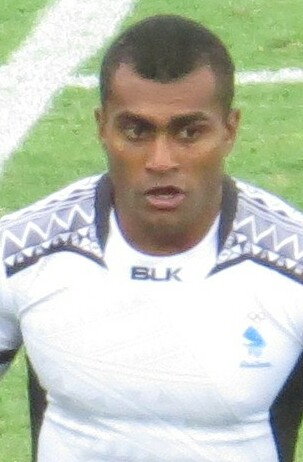
- Apisai Domolailai in 2016
- Born: 16 April 1989 (age 37)
- Height: 1.92 m (6 ft 4 in)
- Weight: 98 kg (216 lb)

Rugby union career
- Position: Forward
National sevens team
Years	Team	Comps
2012–	Fiji 7s	
Medal record
Men's rugby sevens
Representing Fiji
Olympic Games
Gold medal – first place	2016 Rio de Janeiro	Team competition

Apisai Domolailai (born 16 April 1989) is a Fijian rugby union player. He plays for Fiji 7s's rugby sevens team. He was named in the squad to the 2016 Summer Olympics. He made his debut for Fiji in 2012.

He is the nephew of former Fijian international Isoa Domolailai.
