= Simione Kuruvoli (judoka) =

Fijian judoka

Personal information
- Nationality: Fijian
- Born: 17 October 1951 (age 73)

Sport
- Sport: Judo

Simione Kuruvoli (born 17 October 1951) is a Fijian judoka. He competed at the 1984 Summer Olympics and the 1988 Summer Olympics.
