= Gabrieli Qoro =

Fijian athlete (born 1970)

Gabrieli Qoro (born November 22, 1970, in Serua) is a Fijian track and field athlete.

== Career ==
He represented his country in the 1992 Summer Olympics in Barcelona; he was eliminated in the qualification rounds of both the men's long jump and the quarterfinals of the men's 100 meters event. He has since coached netball in Fiji, and has been active in AIDS outreach in the islands.
