= Ana Maria Roqica =

Fijian rugby sevens player

Ana Roqica
- Full name: Ana Maria Roqica
- Born: February 2, 1988 (age 38)
- Height: 1.62 m (5 ft 4 in)
- Weight: 55 kg (121 lb)

Rugby union career
International career
Years	Team	Apps	(Points)
	Fiji	3	(0)
National sevens team
Years	Team		Comps
- Fiji
Medal record
Representing Fiji
Women's rugby sevens
Olympic Games
Bronze medal – third place	2020 Tokyo	Team competition

Ana Maria Roqica (born February 2, 1988) is a Fijian rugby sevens player. She is a member of the Fiji women's national rugby sevens team to the 2016 Summer Olympics.

Roqica was named in the Fijiana team to the 2020 Summer Olympics when she was selected as the 13th player after Luisa Tisolo pulled out due to injury. She won a bronze medal at the event. She has captained the Fijiana side since being named captain in 2011. She also captained them at the Rio Olympics.

Roqica has won gold at the 2011 and 2015 Pacific Games. She was selected for the Fijiana squad to the 2021 Rugby World Cup in New Zealand.
