= Laisana Likuceva =

Fijian rugby sevens player (born 1999)

- Born: 3 February 1999 (age 27)
- Height: 1.69 m (5 ft 7 in)
- Weight: 76 kg (168 lb)
- Notable relative: Napolioni Bolaca (husband)

Rugby union career
National sevens team
Years	Team	Comps
- Fiji
Medal record
Representing Fiji
Women's rugby sevens
Olympic Games
Bronze medal – third place	2020 Tokyo	Team competition

Laisana Likuceva (born 3 February 1999) is a Fijian rugby sevens player. She competed in the women's tournament at the 2020 Summer Olympics. She won a bronze medal at the event.

She represented Fiji at the 2024 Summer Olympics in Paris.
