= Alowesi Nakoci =

Fijian rugby sevens player (born 1991)

Aloesi Nakoci
- Full name: Alowesi Naikodravi Nakoci
- Born: 18 August 1991 (age 35)
- Height: 1.69 m (5 ft 7 in)
- Weight: 70 kg (154 lb)

Rugby union career
- Position: Centre
Super Rugby
Years	Team	Apps	(Points)
2025	Fijian Drua		(0)
International career
Years	Team	Apps	(Points)
2022–	Fiji	8	(15)
National sevens team
Years	Team		Comps
- Fiji
Medal record
Representing Fiji
Women's rugby sevens
Olympic Games
Bronze medal – third place	2020 Tokyo	Team competition

Aloesi Nakoci (born 18 August 1991) is a Fijian rugby sevens player. She represented Fiji at the 2020 and 2024 Summer Olympics. She also competed for the Fijiana fifteens team at the delayed 2021 Rugby World Cup.

== Rugby career ==
Nakoci competed for the Fijiana sevens team at the delayed 2020 Summer Olympics that took place in 2021. She won a bronze medal at the event.

In 2022, she was part of the Fijiana sevens side that participated at the Rugby World Cup Sevens in Cape Town in September. A few weeks later, she played for the Fijiana fifteens team in a warm up match against Canada. She was subsequently named in the Fijiana squad for the delayed 2021 Rugby World Cup which occurred in 2022.

She represented Fiji at the 2024 Summer Olympics in Paris.

On 9 August 2025, she was named in the Fijiana side to the Women's Rugby World Cup in England.
