= Reapi Ulunisau =

Fijian rugby sevens player (born 1994)

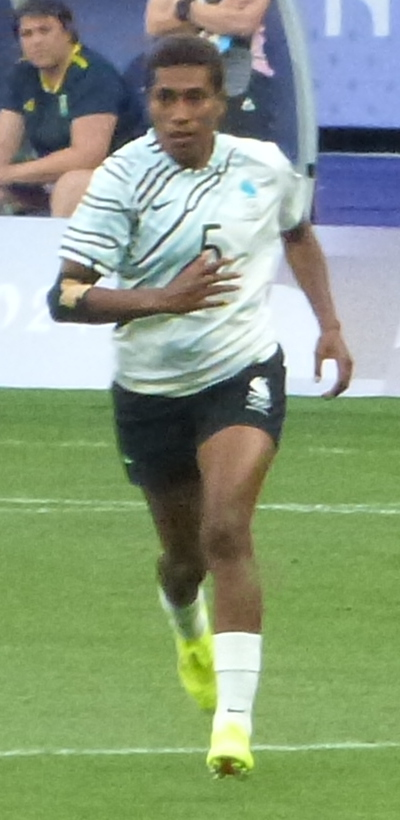
- Born: 2 November 1994 (age 32)
- Height: 1.63 m (5 ft 4 in)
- Weight: 59 kg (130 lb)

Rugby union career
Senior career
| Years | Team | Apps | (Points) |
| 2026 | Delhi Redz | | |
International career
| Years | Team | Apps | (Points) |
| 2023– | Fiji | 1 | (20) |
National sevens team
| Years | Team | | Comps |
| 2021–Present | Fiji | | 64 (274 points) |
Medal record
Representing Fiji
Women's rugby sevens
Olympic Games
| Bronze medal – third place | 2020 Tokyo | Team competition |
Commonwealth Games
| Silver medal – second place | 2022 Birmingham | Team competition |

Reapi Ulunisau (born 2 November 1994) is a Fijian rugby player. She represents Fiji internationally in rugby sevens and fifteens. She won a bronze medal at the delayed 2020 Summer Olympics in Tokyo, and a silver medal at the 2022 Commonwealth Games in Birmingham.

== Rugby career ==
=== 2021 ===
Ulunisau competed in the women's tournament at the 2020 Summer Olympics and won a bronze medal at the event.

=== 2022 ===
Ulunisau was part of the Fijiana sevens team that won the silver medal at the 2022 Commonwealth Games in Birmingham. She also competed at the 2022 Rugby World Cup Sevens in Cape Town.

=== 2023–2024 ===
Ulunisau was named in the Fijiana fifteens team for the 2023 Oceania Rugby Women's Championship. She made her test debut against Papua New Guinea on 26 May at Gold Coast, Queensland, she scored four tries in her sides 77–0 victory.

She represented Fiji at the 2024 Summer Olympics in Paris.
