= Viniana Riwai =

Fijian footballer and rugby sevens player

Personal information
- Full name: Viniana Naisaluwaki Riwai
- Date of birth: 6 June 1991 (age 35)
- Place of birth: Fiji
- Height: 1.65 m (5 ft 5 in)
- Position: Midfielder

Team information
- Current team: Rewa

Senior career*
Years	Team	Apps	(Gls)
- Rewa

International career
2010–	Fiji		
Medal record
Representing Fiji
Women's rugby sevens
Olympic Games
Bronze medal – third place	2020 Tokyo	Team competition
Commonwealth Games
Silver medal – second place	2022 Birmingham	Team competition
- * Club domestic league appearances and goals

Viniana Naisaluwaki Riwai (born 6 June 1991) is a Fijian footballer, who plays as a midfielder for Rewa FC and the Fiji women's national team, and a rugby sevens player, who plays for the Fiji women's national team.

Riwai was educated at Labasa Sangam Primary School, Labasa Muslim College, and Suva Sangam College. She later studied at the University of the South Pacific.

== Football career ==
Riwai took up soccer in high school and was selected for the Fiji women's football team for the 2011 Pacific Games. She capped for Fiji at senior level during the 2018 OFC Women's Nations Cup.

== Rugby sevens career ==
Riwai made her senior international debut for the Fiji women's national rugby sevens team at the 2013 China Women's Sevens. She was named in the 2013 Rugby World Cup Sevens squad for Fiji. She was a member of the Fijian team at the 2016 Summer Olympics.

Riwai competed for Fiji in rugby sevens at the 2020 Summer Olympics and she won a bronze medal at the event.

Riwai was part of the Fijiana sevens team that won the silver medal at the 2022 Commonwealth Games in Birmingham. She also featured at the Rugby World Cup Sevens in Cape Town.
