= Ana Naimasi =

Fijian rugby union player (born 1994)

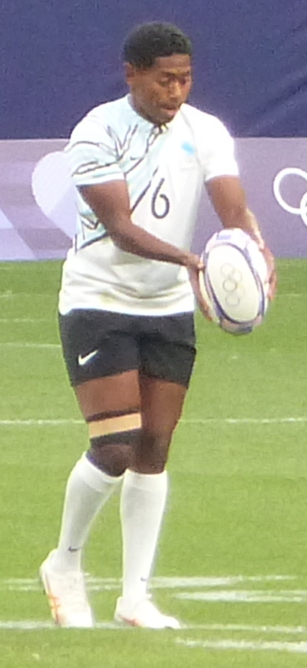
- Born: 21 February 1994 (age 32)
- Height: 1.58 m (5 ft 2 in)
- Weight: 69 kg (152 lb)

Rugby union career
Senior career
Years	Team	Apps	(Points)
2026	Chennai Bulls		
Super Rugby
Years	Team	Apps	(Points)
2025	ACT Brumbies	0	(0)
International career
Years	Team	Apps	(Points)
2022	Fiji	1	(0)
- Correct as of 27 July 2021
National sevens team
Years	Team		Comps
- Fiji
- Correct as of 27 July 2021
Medal record
Women's rugby sevens
Representing Fiji
Olympic Games
Bronze medal – third place	2020 Tokyo	Team competition
Commonwealth Games
Silver medal – second place	2022 Birmingham	Team competition

Ana Maria Naimasi (21 February 1994) is a Fijian rugby union player. She won a bronze medal at the 2020 Summer Olympics in Tokyo. She then competed for the Fijiana fifteens team at the delayed 2021 Rugby World Cup in New Zealand. She also represented Fiji at the 2024 Summer Olympics.

== Career ==
Naimasi was part of the Fiji women's cricket team to Vanuatu for the Tri-Series in 2011 and 2012. She then represented Fiji's under-19 netball team from 2013 to 2014 for the Trans-Tasman Series in New Zealand, and then played for the Fiji A netball side.

She made her international debut for the Fijiana sevens team at the Dubai Sevens in 2017.

Naimasi was named in the Fiji squad for the Rugby sevens at the 2020 Summer Olympics. She won a bronze medal at the event. Going in to the tournament Naimasi had scored 21 international tries.

Naimasi was part of the Fijiana sevens team that won the silver medal at the 2022 Commonwealth Games in Birmingham. She also competed at the Rugby World Cup Sevens in Cape Town. In September she played in a warm up match against Canada. She was also named in the Fijiana squad for the 2021 Rugby World Cup.

She represented Fiji at the 2024 Summer Olympics in Paris.

In 2025, she joined the Brumbies for the Super Rugby Women's competition.
