= Viliame Takayawa =

Fijian judoka (1949–2023)

Personal information
- Born: 21 February 1949 Vatukoula, Colony of Fiji, British Empire
- Died: 20 February 2010 (aged 60)
- Occupation: Judoka

Sport
- Sport: Judo

Profile at external databases
- JudoInside.com: 10670

Viliame Takayawa (21 February 1949 – 20 February 2010) was a Fijian judoka. He competed at the 1984 Summer Olympics and the 1988 Summer Olympics. He was the Fijian flag bearer in the opening ceremonies of both those games.
