= Mesulame Rakuro =

Fijian athlete (1932–1969)

Personal information
- Born: 15 May 1932 Nailaga, Colony of Fiji, British Empire
- Died: 13 June 1969 (aged 37) Drasa Training Farm, Fiji

Sport
- Sport: Athletics
- Events: Discus throw, shot put
Medal record
South Pacific Games
Gold medal – first place	1963 Suva	Discus
Gold medal – first place	1963 Suva	Shot put
Gold medal – first place	1966 Nouméa	Discus

Mesulame Rakuro (12 May 1932 – 13 June 1969) was a Fijian athlete specialising in the discus throw and shot put.

== Biography ==
Born in Nailaga, Ba Province, Rakuro was a teacher. He competed in both the discus (in which he finished eighth) and 4 x 110 yards relay at the 1954 British Empire and Commonwealth Games, before being selected to represent Fiji at the 1956 Summer Olympics, the first time the country had participated in the Olympics. He qualified for the final round, in which he finished fifteenth. He subsequently represented Fiji at the Independence Games in Malaya the following year, and was again selected for the British Empire and Commonwealth Games of 1958, where he finished fifth. Following the games, he competed in a Commonwealth versus Great Britain athletics meet in London in August 1958, where he set a Fijian discus record of 51.84m, The record stood for 61 years until being broken by Mustafa Fall in 2019.

Rakuro competed in the 1960 Summer Olympics, but failed to progress beyond the qualifying round. However, he went on to win gold in both the discus and shot put in the 1963 South Pacific Games. He retained his gold in the discus in the 1966 edition.

Rakuro was Fiji's first Olympic flag bearer. He carried the flag of Fiji in the opening ceremonies of both the 1956 and 1960 Summer Games.

Rakuro died at his home in the Drasa Training Farm in June 1969. He was inducted into the Fiji Sports Hall of Fame in 1991.
