= Sharon Pickering (swimmer) =

Fijian swimmer

Personal information
- Born: 24 June 1967 (age 59)

Sport
- Sport: Swimming

Sharon Pickering (born 24 June 1967) is a Fijian former swimmer. She competed at the 1984, 1988 and the 1992 Summer Olympics.
