= Raijieli Daveua =

Fijian rugby sevens player (born 1992)

- Born: May 30, 1992 (age 34) Fiji
- Height: 1.75 m (5 ft 9 in)
- Weight: 69 kg (152 lb)

Rugby union career
- Position: Lock
Super Rugby
| Years | Team | Apps | (Points) |
| 2025 | Fijian Drua | | (0) |
International career
| Years | Team | Apps | (Points) |
| | Fiji | | (0) |
National sevens team
| Years | Team | | Comps |
- Fiji
Medal record
Representing Fiji
Women's rugby sevens
Olympic Games
| Bronze medal – third place | 2020 Tokyo | Team competition |
Commonwealth Games
| Silver medal – second place | 2022 Birmingham | Team competition |

Raijieli Daveua (born May 30, 1992) is a Fijian rugby sevens player. She was selected as a member of the Fiji women's national rugby sevens team to the 2016 Summer Olympics.

== Rugby career ==
Daveua also competed for Fiji at the 2020 Summer Olympics in Tokyo. She won a bronze medal at the event.

Daveua won a silver medal with the Fijiana sevens team at the 2022 Commonwealth Games in Birmingham. She also featured at the 2022 Rugby World Cup Sevens in Cape Town.

Daveua was named on the bench in the warm up match against Canada ahead of the World Cup. She was selected for the Fijiana squad to the 2021 Rugby World Cup in New Zealand.

She represented Fiji at the 2024 Summer Olympics in Paris.
