= Glenn Kable =

Fijian sport shooter

Personal information
- Nationality: Fijian
- Born: 4 May 1963 (age 63) Sydney, Australia
- Height: 1.85 m (6 ft 1 in)
- Weight: 92 kg (203 lb)

Sport
- Country: Fiji
- Sport: Shooting
- Event: Trap
- Coached by: Josh Lakatos
Medal record
Men's Shooting
Representing Fiji
Oceania Championships
Gold medal – first place	2011 Sydney	Trap
Silver medal – second place	2015 Sydney	Trap
Bronze medal – third place	2013 Sydney	Trap
- Updated on 24 August 2016

Glenn Kable (born 4 May 1963) is a Fijian sport shooter who specializes in the trap event.

He was controversially omitted from the Australian Olympic Team in 2000 after winning the selection shoot and being a member of the World Championship winning Men's Olympic Trap team from Tampere, Finland, in 1999. He formed the Shooting Association of Fiji shortly thereafter, registering with the ISSF under the Oceanic banner, after an extended business relationship with Fiji, which commenced with family dealings from the late 1970s.

He won the World Cup in Korea in 2001 in the first International Shooting event that Fiji had entered. He went on to claim a silver medal in the Italian World Cup that same year in Lonato, climbing to 5th on the World rankings. Subsequently, he picked up a bronze medal at the World Cup in Perth, Australia in 2003, after shooting a perfect 75/75 on the first day.

He represented Fiji in the Commonwealth Games in Manchester in 2002, shooting off for the final, and reproducing exactly the same result as at the Melbourne Commonwealth Games in 2006. Going 1 further in the 2018 Commonwealth Games on the Gold Coast, making the final before finishing in 6th place. Was a late in inclusion in the 2014 edition of the games after Fiji was a late admission back to the Commonwealth Games Federation.

In 2011 he scored a new Pacific Games record by winning all 6 Gold Medals in the Clay Target Shooting events in Nouméa, and to date has won a total of 13 Gold Medals, 4 Silver medals and 4 Bronze medals at the South Pacific Games (now the Pacific Games) in Suva, Samoa, Nouméa, Port Morseby, and Samoa in 2003, 2007, 2011, 2015, and 2019 respectively.

At the 2008 Olympic Games he finished in joint thirteenth place in the trap qualification, missing a place among the top six, who progress to the final round. He also competed at the 2004, 2008, 2012 and 2016 Olympic Games.

He won the 2011 Oceania Title and an Olympic Quota place for 2012 London Olympics. Placed second in the same event in 2015, again collecting the Olympic quota. He also won the 2012 Australian National Olympic Trap Title.

He attended high school at The King's School, Parramatta. He continued his education at the University of Sydney, residing at St Andrew's College, where he studied Law.

Specialising in Firearms Law, Kable previously worked for Hartmann & Associates until June 2026. Kable appears in court and advises in all matters relating to firearms, clubs and association issues. He has also been appointed to the board of the Australian Clay Target Association.
