= Fiji Association of Sports and National Olympic Committee =

National Olympic Committee

- Country: Fiji
- Code: FIJ
- Created: 1949
- Recognized: 1955
- Continental Association: ONOC
- President: Makarita Leona
- Secretary General: Lorraine Mar
- Website: www.fasanoc.org.fj

The Fiji Association of Sports and National Olympic Committee (FASANOC; IOC Code: FIJ) was founded on 25 March 1949 and achieved International Olympic Committee (IOC) recognition on 20 September 1955. It is responsible for entering Fiji's representatives in the Olympic Games and the coordination and management of Fiji Teams to the South Pacific Mini Games, South Pacific Games and the Commonwealth Games. It also provides technical assistance and funding to its affiliates in the areas of coaching, athlete development, sports medicine and sports administration.

== Membership ==
22 National Sports Federations are affiliated to FASANOC's Olympic Program:

- Alpine skiing
- Archery
- Athletics
- Badminton
- Baseball
- Basketball
- Boxing
- Cycling
- Football
- Golf
- Hockey
- Judo
- Rugby
- Shooting
- Swimming
- Table tennis
- Taekwondo
- Tennis
- Triathlon
- Volleyball
- Weightlifting
- Yachting

Affiliated International Federations recognised by the IOC but whose sport is not on the Games programme include:

- Billiards & Snooker
- Bodybuilding
- Chess
- Karate
- Netball
- Squash
- Surfing

Other National Federations affiliated to FASANOC are:

- Bowls
- Cricket
- Darts
- FUSA
- Gamefishing
- Outrigger canoeing
- Paralympic
- Powerlifting
- Touch rugby
- Rugby league

FASANOC itself is affiliated to the International Olympic Committee, is a member of the Oceania National Olympic Committees (ONOC), the Association of National Olympic Committees (ANOC), the Commonwealth Games Federation and the Pacific Games Council.

== Finance ==
FASANOC finances its activities via a number of sources. The Fiji Government does not assist FASANOC financially towards its administrative expenses, but does assist towards Team Fiji's preparation and participation costs. It also provides financial assistance to its affiliates for overseas tours, the training of elite athletes in preparation for international events and meets, the hiring of coaches and Development Officers, and international tournaments hosted in Fiji.

== Participation in regional games ==
FASANOC has coordinated the participation of Fiji athletes in the Empire / Commonwealth Games (since 1950), the Olympic Games (since 1956), the South Pacific Games (since 1963), and the South Pacific Mini Games (since 1981).

Fiji participated in the Empire or Commonwealth Games every four years from 1950 to 1986 before being suspended from the Commonwealth. Readmitted in 1997, Fiji participated in Malaysia in September 1998 and the 2002 Commonwealth Games. Fiji was suspended from the Commonwealth a second time in 2006, leading to a suspension from the Commonwealth Games Federation and the Games after 2006.

FASANOC has coordinated the participation of Fiji's athletes in the South Pacific Games since the inaugural event held in Suva in 1963, and the Mini South Pacific Games first held in Honiara, Solomon Islands in 1981. This has been the major activity of FASANOC, coordinating teams of 400+ athletes competing in up to 30 different sports in the major games and about 150 athletes competing in nine sports in the South Pacific Mini Games. Fiji hosted the 12th South Pacific Games in Suva from 28 June – 12 July 2003.

== Fiji Sports Hall of Fame ==
FASANOC also oversees the recognition of Fijian sportsmen and sportswomen via the Fiji Sports Hall of Fame. Since 1990, the Hall of Fame has recognised Fiji athletes of the past who have excelled in their respective sports at international level, and every year two more are inducted. The Fiji Sports Hall of Fame was inaugurated by FASANOC and the Central Manufacturing Company Ltd.

Hall of Fame Inductees:

Year	Name	Sport
1990	Josefa Levula	Rugby Union
1990	Mataika Tuicakau	Athletics
1991	Mesulame Rakuro	Athletics
1991	Saimoni Tamani	Athletics
1992	Justine Macaskill	Swimming
1992	Luke Tunabuna	Athletics
1993	Ana Ramacake	Athletics
1993	Usaia Sotutu	Athletics
1994	Merewai Turukawa	Athletics
1994	Samuela Yavala	Athletics
1995	Torika Varo	Athletics
1995	Carl Bay	Swimming
1996	Viliame Liga	Athletics
1996	Subhash Chand	Boxing
1997	Miriama Tuisorisori	Athletics
1997	Apakuki Tuitavua	Rugby

From 1998 the rules were changed to allow an indefinite number of people to be part of the Hall of Fame

Year	Name	Sport
1998	Mereoni Vibose	Athletics
1999	Viliame Saulekaleka	Athletics
2001	Willow Fong	Women's Bowls
2001	Alipate Korovou	Boxing
2002	Pio Bosco Tikoisuva	Rugby union
2002	Vijay Singh	Golf
2003	Joseph Rodan	Athletics
2005	Waisale Serevi	Rugby Sevens
2005	Ilikena Bula	Cricket
2006	Maraia Lum On	Women's Lawn Bowls
2006	Viliame Takayawa	Judo
2007	Albert Miller	Athletics
2007	Sharon Pickering	Swimming
2008	Harry Joseph Apted	Cricket
2009	Tony Moore	Athletics
2009	Anthony Steven (Tony) Philp	Windsurfing
2010	Vilitati Qumivutia	Weightlifting
2011	Ratu Sir George Cakobau	Rugby union
2012	Frederick Lawrence Curling Valentine	Cricket
2012	Iliesa Delana	Athletics
2013	Binesh Prasad	Athletics
2014	Jone Delai	Athletics
2014	Vilimaina Davu	Netball
2015	Vaciseva Tavaga	Athletics
2017	Josaia Voreqe	Athletics
2017	Fiji Mens Rugby Sevens Team	Rugby

== See also ==
- Fiji at the Olympics
- Fiji at the Commonwealth Games
- National Olympic Committee
