= France at the 2016 Summer Olympics =

- IOC code: FRA
- NOC: French National Olympic and Sports Committee
- Website: www.franceolympique.com (in French)

in Rio de Janeiro 5 August 2016 – 21 August 2016
- Competitors: 401 in 27 sports
- Flag bearer: Teddy Riner
- Medals Ranked 7th: Gold 10 Silver 18 Bronze 14 Total 42

Summer Olympics appearances (overview)
- 1896; 1900; ~~1904~~; 1908; 1912; 1920; 1924; 1928; 1932; 1936; 1948; 1952; 1956; 1960; 1964; 1968; 1972; 1976; 1980; 1984; 1988; 1992; 1996; 2000; 2004; 2008; 2012; 2016; 2020; 2024; 2028

Other related appearances
- 1906 Intercalated Games

France competed at the 2016 Summer Olympics in Rio de Janeiro, Brazil, from 5 to 21 August 2016. French athletes had appeared in every Summer Olympic Games of the modern era, alongside Australia, Great Britain, and Greece. The French Olympic Committee sent its largest ever delegation in Olympic history outside of when it was the host nation, with a total of 401 athletes, 232 men and 169 women, competing in all sports, except field hockey.

== Medallists ==
| Medal | Name | Sport | Event | Date |
|---|---|---|---|---|
| Gold | Denis Gargaud Chanut | Canoeing | Men's slalom C-1 | 9 August |
| Gold | Karim Laghouag; Mathieu Lemoine; Astier Nicolas; Thibaut Vallette | Equestrian | Team eventing | 9 August |
| Gold | Jérémie Azou; Pierre Houin | Rowing | Men's lightweight double sculls | 12 August |
| Gold | Émilie Andéol | Judo | Women's +78 kg | 12 August |
| Gold | Teddy Riner | Judo | Men's +100 kg | 12 August |
| Gold | Yannick Borel; Gauthier Grumier; Daniel Jerent; Jean-Michel Lucenay* | Fencing | Men's team épée | 14 August |
| Gold | Charline Picon | Sailing | Women's RS:X | 14 August |
| Gold | Philippe Rozier; Kevin Staut; Roger-Yves Bost; Pénélope Leprevost | Equestrian | Team jumping | 17 August |
| Gold | Estelle Mossely | Boxing | Women's lightweight | 19 August |
| Gold | Tony Yoka | Boxing | Men's super heavyweight | 21 August |
| Silver | Fabien Gilot; Florent Manaudou; Mehdy Metella; William Meynard*; Clément Mignon*; Jérémy Stravius | Swimming | Men's 4 × 100 m freestyle relay | 7 August |
| Silver | Astier Nicolas | Equestrian | Individual eventing | 9 August |
| Silver | Clarisse Agbegnenou | Judo | Women's 63 kg | 9 August |
| Silver | Audrey Tcheuméo | Judo | Women's 78 kg | 11 August |
| Silver | Jean-Charles Valladont | Archery | Men's individual | 12 August |
| Silver | Jérémy Cadot; Erwann Le Péchoux; Enzo Lefort; Jean-Paul Tony Helissey | Fencing | Men's team foil | 12 August |
| Silver | Florent Manaudou | Swimming | Men's 50 m freestyle | 12 August |
| Silver | Jean Quiquampoix | Shooting | Men's 25 m rapid fire pistol | 13 August |
| Silver | Renaud Lavillenie | Athletics | Men's pole vault | 15 August |
| Silver | Mélina Robert-Michon | Athletics | Women's discus throw | 16 August |
| Silver | Sofiane Oumiha | Boxing | Men's lightweight | 16 August |
| Silver | Kévin Mayer | Athletics | Men's decathlon | 18 August |
| Silver | Élodie Clouvel | Modern pentathlon | Women's pentathlon | 19 August |
| Silver | Haby Niaré | Taekwondo | Women's 67 kg | 19 August |
| Silver | Maxime Beaumont | Canoeing | Men's K-1 200 m | 20 August |
| Silver | Sarah Ourahmoune | Boxing | Women's flyweight | 20 August |
| Silver | France women's national handball team: Camille Ayglon; Chloé Bulleux; Blandine Dancette; Siraba Dembélé; Béatrice Edwige; Laura Glauser; Manon Houette; Alexandra Lacrabère; Laurisa Landre; Amandine Leynaud; Gnonsiane Niombla; Estelle Nze Minko; Allison Pineau; Grace Zaadi | Handball | Women's tournament | 20 August |
| Silver | France men's national handball team: Olivier Nyokas; Daniel Narcisse; Vincent Gérard; Nikola Karabatić; Kentin Mahé; Mathieu Grébille; Thierry Omeyer; Timothey N'Guessan; Luc Abalo; Cédric Sorhaindo; Michaël Guigou; Luka Karabatić; Ludovic Fabregas; Adrien Dipanda; Valentin Porte | Handball | Men's tournament | 21 August |
| Bronze | Gauthier Grumier | Fencing | Men's épée | 9 August |
| Bronze | Gauthier Klauss; Matthieu Péché | Canoeing | Men's C-2 | 11 August |
| Bronze | Grégory Baugé; Michaël D'Almeida; François Pervis | Cycling | Men's team sprint | 11 August |
| Bronze | Cyrille Maret | Judo | Men's 100 kg | 11 August |
| Bronze | Thomas Baroukh; Thibault Colard; Guillaume Raineau; Franck Solforosi | Rowing | Men's lightweight coxless four | 11 August |
| Bronze | Pierre Le Coq | Sailing | Men's RS:X | 14 August |
| Bronze | Alexis Raynaud | Shooting | Men's 50 m rifle three positions | 14 August |
| Bronze | Souleymane Cissokho | Boxing | Men's welterweight | 15 August |
| Bronze | Dimitri Bascou | Athletics | Men's 110 m hurdles | 16 August |
| Bronze | Mathieu Bauderlique | Boxing | Men's light heavyweight | 16 August |
| Bronze | Marc-Antoine Olivier | Swimming | Men's 10 km open water | 16 August |
| Bronze | Mahiedine Mekhissi-Benabbad | Athletics | Men's 3000 m steeplechase | 17 August |
| Bronze | Camille Lecointre; Hélène Defrance | Sailing | Women's 470 | 18 August |
| Bronze | Christophe Lemaitre | Athletics | Men's 200 m | 18 August |

Medals by sport
| Sport | 1st place, gold medalist(s) | 2nd place, silver medalist(s) | 3rd place, bronze medalist(s) | Total |
| Boxing | 2 | 2 | 2 | 6 |
| Judo | 2 | 2 | 1 | 5 |
| Equestrian | 2 | 1 | 0 | 3 |
| Canoeing | 1 | 1 | 1 | 3 |
| Fencing | 1 | 1 | 1 | 3 |
| Sailing | 1 | 0 | 2 | 3 |
| Rowing | 1 | 0 | 1 | 2 |
| Athletics | 0 | 3 | 3 | 6 |
| Swimming | 0 | 2 | 1 | 3 |
| Handball | 0 | 2 | 0 | 2 |
| Shooting | 0 | 1 | 1 | 2 |
| Archery | 0 | 1 | 0 | 1 |
| Pentathlon | 0 | 1 | 0 | 1 |
| Taekwondo | 0 | 1 | 0 | 1 |
| Cycling | 0 | 0 | 1 | 1 |
| Total | 10 | 18 | 14 | 42 |

Medals by date
| Day | Date | 1st place, gold medalist(s) | 2nd place, silver medalist(s) | 3rd place, bronze medalist(s) | Total |
| 1 | 6 Aug | 0 | 0 | 0 | 0 |
| 2 | 7 Aug | 0 | 1 | 0 | 1 |
| 3 | 8 Aug | 0 | 0 | 0 | 0 |
| 4 | 9 Aug | 2 | 2 | 1 | 5 |
| 5 | 10 Aug | 0 | 0 | 0 | 0 |
| 6 | 11 Aug | 0 | 1 | 4 | 5 |
| 7 | 12 Aug | 3 | 3 | 0 | 6 |
| 8 | 13 Aug | 0 | 1 | 0 | 1 |
| 9 | 14 Aug | 2 | 0 | 2 | 4 |
| 10 | 15 Aug | 0 | 1 | 1 | 2 |
| 11 | 16 Aug | 0 | 2 | 3 | 5 |
| 12 | 17 Aug | 1 | 0 | 1 | 2 |
| 13 | 18 Aug | 0 | 1 | 2 | 3 |
| 14 | 19 Aug | 1 | 2 | 0 | 3 |
| 15 | 20 Aug | 0 | 3 | 0 | 3 |
| 16 | 21 Aug | 1 | 1 | 0 | 2 |
| Total | | 10 | 18 | 14 | 42 |

Medals by gender
| Gender | 1st place, gold medalist(s) | 2nd place, silver medalist(s) | 3rd place, bronze medalist(s) | Total |
| Male | 5 | 10 | 13 | 28 |
| Female | 3 | 7 | 1 | 11 |
| Mixed | 2 | 1 | 0 | 3 |
| Total | 10 | 18 | 14 | 42 |

* – Indicates the athlete competed in preliminaries but not the final

=== Multiple medallists ===
The following competitors won several medals at the 2016 Summer Olympics.

| Name | Medal | Sport | Event |
|---|---|---|---|
| Astier Nicolas | Gold; Silver | Equestrian | Team eventing Individual eventing |
| Gauthier Grumier | Gold; Bronze | Fencing | Men's team épée Men's épée |
| Florent Manaudou | Silver; Silver | Swimming | Men's 4 × 100 m freestyle relay Men's 50 m freestyle |

== Competitors ==
The following is the list of number of competitors participating in the Games. Note that reserves in fencing, field hockey, football, and handball are not counted as athletes:

| Sport | Men | Women | Total |
|---|---|---|---|
| Archery | 3 | 0 | 3 |
| Athletics | 29 | 25 | 54 |
| Badminton | 1 | 1 | 2 |
| Basketball | 12 | 12 | 24 |
| Boxing | 8 | 2 | 10 |
| Canoeing | 11 | 6 | 17 |
| Cycling | 14 | 7 | 21 |
| Diving | 2 | 1 | 3 |
| Equestrian | 9 | 3 | 12 |
| Fencing | 9 | 8 | 17 |
| Football | 0 | 18 | 18 |
| Golf | 2 | 2 | 4 |
| Gymnastics | 6 | 7 | 13 |
| Handball | 15 | 16 | 31 |
| Judo | 7 | 7 | 14 |
| Modern pentathlon | 2 | 1 | 3 |
| Rowing | 14 | 4 | 18 |
| Rugby sevens | 12 | 12 | 24 |
| Sailing | 8 | 7 | 15 |
| Shooting | 7 | 4 | 11 |
| Swimming | 17 | 13 | 30 |
| Synchronized swimming | 0 | 2 | 2 |
| Table tennis | 3 | 1 | 4 |
| Taekwondo | 1 | 3 | 4 |
| Tennis | 6 | 3 | 9 |
| Triathlon | 3 | 2 | 5 |
| Volleyball | 12 | 0 | 12 |
| Water polo | 13 | 0 | 13 |
| Weightlifting | 4 | 1 | 5 |
| Wrestling | 1 | 1 | 2 |
| Total | 232 | 169 | 401 |

== Archery ==
Three French archers qualified for the men's events by virtue of the nation's podium finish in the team recurve competition at the 2016 Archery World Cup meet in Antalya, Turkey.

| Athlete | Event | Ranking round | | Round of 64 | Round of 32 | Round of 16 | Quarterfinals | Semifinals | Final / BM | |
| Athlete | Event | Score | Seed | Opposition Score | Opposition Score | Opposition Score | Opposition Score | Opposition Score | Opposition Score | Rank |
|---|---|---|---|---|---|---|---|---|---|---|
| Lucas Daniel | Men's individual | 666 | 21 | Alvariño (ESP); L 0–6 | did not advance | | | | | |
| Pierre Plihon | Men's individual | 657 | 36 | Gazoz (TUR); L 5–6 | did not advance | | | | | |
| Jean-Charles Valladont | Men's individual | 680 | 8 | Kouassi (CIV); W 6–4 | Ruban (UKR); W 6–0 | Thamwong (THA); W 6–0 | Nespoli (ITA); W 6–5 | van den Berg (NED); W 7–3 | Ku B-c (KOR); L 3–7 | 2nd place, silver medalist(s) |
| Lucas Daniel; Pierre Plihon; Jean-Charles Valladont | Men's team | 2003 | 5 | —N/a | | Malaysia; W 6–2 | Australia; L 3–5 | did not advance | | |

== Athletics ==
French athletes have so far achieved qualifying standards in the following athletics events (up to a maximum of 3 athletes in each event):

On 25 April 2016, marathon runner Christelle Daunay and race walkers Yohann Diniz and Kévin Campion became the first French athletes to be selected to the Olympic team. Decathlete Kévin Mayer and women's 20 km (12 mi) racewalker Émilie Menuet were named as part of the second batch of nominated athletes to the Olympic roster on 7 June 2016.

A total of 22 athletes (11 per gender) were added to the track and field team for the Games, based on their performances achieved at the French Championships & Olympic Trials ( 24 to 26 June) in Angers, with Mélina Robert-Michon throwing the discus at her fifth straight Games, Kafétien Gomis returning for his second Olympics in the long jump after a 12-year absence, and pole vaulter Renaud Lavillenie aiming to defend his Olympic pole vault title. Other athletes also featured Christophe Lemaitre, middle-distance runner Pierre-Ambroise Bosse, steeplechaser and double Olympic silver medalist Mahiedine Mekhissi-Benabbad, and 2015 Worlds bronze medalist Alexandra Tavernier (women's hammer throw). Twenty-seven more athletes rounded out the French roster at the end of the qualifying period, extending its size to a total of 54.

Key

- Note–Ranks given for track events are within the athlete's heat only
- Q = Qualified for the next round
- q = Qualified for the next round as a fastest loser or, in field events, by position without achieving the qualifying target
- NR = National record
- N/A = Round not applicable for the event
- Bye = Athlete not required to compete in round

Track & road events
Men

| Athlete | Event | Heat | | Quarterfinal | | Semifinal | | Final | |
| Athlete | Event | Result | Rank | Result | Rank | Result | Rank | Result | Rank |
|---|---|---|---|---|---|---|---|---|---|
| Dimitri Bascou | 110 m hurdles | 13.31 | 1 Q | —N/a | | 13.23 | 1 Q | 13.24 | 3rd place, bronze medalist(s) |
| Wilhem Belocian | 110 m hurdles | DSQ | | —N/a | | did not advance | | | |
| Pierre-Ambroise Bosse | 800 m | 1:48.12 | 1 Q | —N/a | | 1:43.85 | 1 Q | 1:43.41 | 4 |
| Kévin Campion | 20 km walk | —N/a | | | | | | 1:26:22 | 49 |
| Florian Carvalho | 1500 m | 3:41.87 | 10 | —N/a | | did not advance | | | |
| Yohann Diniz | 50 km walk | —N/a | | | | | | 3:46:43 | 8 |
| Yoann Kowal | 3000 m steeplechase | 8:23.49 | 5 q | —N/a | | | | 8:16.75 | 5 |
| Christophe Lemaitre | 100 m | Bye | | 10.16 | 3 q | 10.07 | 3 | did not advance | |
| Christophe Lemaitre | 200 m | 20.28 | 2 Q | —N/a | | 20.01 | 2 Q | 20.12 | 3rd place, bronze medalist(s) |
| Pascal Martinot-Lagarde | 110 m hurdles | 13.36 | 2 Q | —N/a | | 13.25 | 2 Q | 13.29 | 4 |
| Mahiedine Mekhissi-Benabbad | 3000 m steeplechase | 8:26.32 | 3 Q | —N/a | | | | 8:11.52 | 3rd place, bronze medalist(s) |
| Jimmy Vicaut | 100 m | Bye | | 10.19 | 4 q | 9.95 | 1 Q | 10.04 | 7 |
| Guy-Elphège Anouman; Stuart Dutamby; Christophe Lemaitre; Marvin René; Jimmy Vicaut; Mickael-Meba Zeze | 4 × 100 m relay | 38.35 | 5 | —N/a | | | | did not advance | |
| Mame-Ibra Anne; Teddy Atine-Venel; Mamadou Kasse Hann; Mamoudou Hanne; Thomas Jordier; Ludvy Vaillant | 4 × 400 m relay | 3:00.82 | 6 | —N/a | | | | did not advance | |

Women

| Athlete | Event | Heat | | Semifinal | | Final | |
| Athlete | Event | Result | Rank | Result | Rank | Result | Rank |
|---|---|---|---|---|---|---|---|
| Phara Anacharsis | 400 m hurdles | 56.64 | 5 | did not advance | | | |
| Cindy Billaud | 100 m hurdles | 12.98 | 5 q | 13.03 | 6 | did not advance | |
| Christelle Daunay | Marathon | —N/a | | | | DNF | |
| Justine Fedronic | 800 m | 2:02.73 | 5 | did not advance | | | |
| Sandra Gomis | 100 m hurdles | 13.04 | 3 Q | 13.23 | 7 | did not advance | |
| Floria Gueï | 400 m | 51.29 | 3 q | 51.08 | 4 | did not advance | |
| Rénelle Lamote | 800 m | 2:02.19 | 5 | did not advance | | | |
| Émilie Menuet | 20 km walk | —N/a | | | | 1:32:04 | 13 |
| Stella Akakpo; Céline Distel-Bonnet; Floriane Gnafoua; Jennifer Galais; Maroussia Paré; Carolle Zahi | 4 × 100 m relay | 43.07 | 4 | —N/a | | did not advance | |
| Phara Anacharsis; Elea Mariama Diarra; Floria Gueï; Marie Gayot; Brigitte Ntiamoah; Agnès Raharolahy | 4 × 400 m relay | 3:26.18 | 5 | —N/a | | did not advance | |

Field events

| Athlete | Event | Qualification | | Final | |
| Athlete | Event | Distance | Position | Distance | Position |
|---|---|---|---|---|---|
| Benjamin Compaoré | Triple jump | 16.72 | 9 Q | 16.54 | 10 |
| Harold Correa | Triple jump | 16.60 | 13 | did not advance | |
| Kafétien Gomis | Long jump | 7.89 | 11 q | 8.05 | 8 |
| Stanley Joseph | Pole vault | 5.45 | 16 | did not advance | |
| Renaud Lavillenie | Pole vault | 5.70 | 4 Q | 5.98 | 2nd place, silver medalist(s) |
| Kévin Menaldo | Pole vault | 5.45 | 16 | did not advance | |

Women

| Athlete | Event | Qualification | | Final | |
| Athlete | Event | Distance | Position | Distance | Position |
|---|---|---|---|---|---|
| Mathilde Andraud | Javelin throw | 56.61 | 24 | did not advance | |
| Jeanine Assani Issouf | Triple jump | 13.97 | 19 | did not advance | |
| Vanessa Boslak | Pole vault | 4.30 | 28 | did not advance | |
| Pauline Pousse | Discus throw | 58.98 | 13 | did not advance | |
| Mélina Robert-Michon | Discus throw | 62.59 | 7 Q | 66.73 NR | 2nd place, silver medalist(s) |
| Alexandra Tavernier | Hammer throw | 70.30 | 12 q | 65.18 | 11 |

Combined events – Men's decathlon

| Athlete | Event | 100 m | LJ | SP | HJ | 400 m | 110H | DT | PV | JT | 1500 m | Final | Rank |
|---|---|---|---|---|---|---|---|---|---|---|---|---|---|
| Bastien Auzeil | Result | 11.17 | 7.07 | 15.41 | 1.98 | 49.34 | 14.82 | 42.23 | 5.10 | 61.91 | 4:40.50 | 8064 | 13 |
| Bastien Auzeil | Points | 823 | 830 | 815 | 785 | 845 | 871 | 710 | 941 | 767 | 677 | 8064 | 13 |
| Kévin Mayer | Result | 10.81 | 7.60 | 15.76 | 2.04 | 48.28 | 14.02 | 46.78 | 5.40 | 65.04 | 4:25.49 | 8834 NR | 2nd place, silver medalist(s) |
| Kévin Mayer | Points | 903 | 960 | 836 | 840 | 896 | 972 | 804 | 1035 | 814 | 774 | 8834 NR | 2nd place, silver medalist(s) |

Combined events – Women's heptathlon

| Athlete | Event | 100H | HJ | SP | 200 m | LJ | JT | 800 m | Final | Rank |
|---|---|---|---|---|---|---|---|---|---|---|
| Antoinette Nana Djimou Ida | Result | 13.37 | 1.77 | 14.88 | 25.07 | 6.43 | 48.76 | 2:20.36 | 6383 | 11 |
| Antoinette Nana Djimou Ida | Points | 1069 | 941 | 853 | 880 | 985 | 836 | 819 | 6383 | 11 |

== Badminton ==
France has qualified two badminton players for each of the following events into the Olympic tournament. London 2012 Olympian Brice Leverdez and Delphine Lansac were selected among the top 34 individual shuttlers each in the men's and women's singles based on the BWF World Rankings as of 5 May 2016.

| Athlete | Event | Group Stage | | | Elimination | Quarterfinal | Semifinal | Final / BM | |
| Athlete | Event | Opposition Score | Opposition Score | Rank | Opposition Score | Opposition Score | Opposition Score | Opposition Score | Rank |
|---|---|---|---|---|---|---|---|---|---|
| Brice Leverdez | Men's singles | Jørgensen (DEN); L (11–21, 18–21) | Must (EST); W (21–18, 18–21, 21–12) | 2 | did not advance | | | | |
| Delphine Lansac | Women's singles | Sung J-h (KOR); L (13–21, 14–21) | Liang Xy (SIN); L (7–21, 15–21) | 3 | did not advance | | | | |

== Basketball ==
=== Men's tournament ===
France men's basketball team qualified for the Olympics by securing its lone outright berth and winning the final match over Canada at the Manila leg of the 2016 FIBA World Qualifying Tournament.

Team roster

The following is the France roster in the men's basketball tournament of the 2016 Summer Olympics.

France men's national basketball team – 2016 Summer Olympics roster
Players
Coaches

| Pos. | No. | Name | Age – Date of birth | Height | Club | Ctr. |
|---|---|---|---|---|---|---|
| PG | 4 | Thomas Heurtel | 27 – 10 April 1989 | 1.88 m (6 ft 2 in) | Anadolu Efes S.K. | (Turkey) |
| SF | 5 | Nicolas Batum | 27 – 14 December 1988 | 2.03 m (6 ft 8 in) | Charlotte Hornets | (United States) |
| G | 6 | Antoine Diot | 27 – 17 January 1989 | 1.93 m (6 ft 4 in) | Valencia BC | (Spain) |
| F/C | 7 | Joffrey Lauvergne | 24 – 30 September 1991 | 2.09 m (6 ft 10 in) | Denver Nuggets | (United States) |
| SF | 8 | Charles Lombahe-Kahudi | 30 – 19 July 1986 | 1.97 m (6 ft 6 in) | ASVEL Basket | (France) |
| PG | 9 | Tony Parker | 34 – 17 May 1982 | 1.86 m (6 ft 1 in) | San Antonio Spurs | (United States) |
| PF | 11 | Florent Piétrus | 35 – 19 January 1981 | 2.01 m (6 ft 7 in) | SLUC Nancy | (France) |
| G | 12 | Nando de Colo | 29 – 23 June 1987 | 1.96 m (6 ft 5 in) | CSKA Moscow | (Russia) |
| PF | 13 | Boris Diaw | 34 – 16 April 1982 | 2.03 m (6 ft 8 in) | Utah Jazz | (United States) |
| SF | 15 | Mickaël Gelabale | 33 – 22 May 1983 | 2.01 m (6 ft 7 in) | Le Mans Sarthe | (France) |
| C | 16 | Rudy Gobert | 24 – 26 June 1992 | 2.16 m (7 ft 1 in) | Utah Jazz | (United States) |
| C | 17 | Kim Tillie | 28 – 15 July 1988 | 2.11 m (6 ft 11 in) | Saski Baskonia | (Spain) |

Head coach

- (France) Vincent Collet

Assistant coach(es)

- (France) Jacques Commères
- (France) Ruddy Nelhomme

Legend

- Club – describes last
  club before the tournament
- Age – describes age
  on 6 August 2016

Group play

| Pos | Team | Pld | W | L | PF | PA | PD | Pts | Qualification |
|---|---|---|---|---|---|---|---|---|---|
| 1 | United States | 5 | 5 | 0 | 524 | 407 | +117 | 10 | Quarterfinals |
| 2 | Australia | 5 | 4 | 1 | 444 | 368 | +76 | 9 | Quarterfinals |
| 3 | France | 5 | 3 | 2 | 423 | 378 | +45 | 8 | Quarterfinals |
| 4 | Serbia | 5 | 2 | 3 | 426 | 387 | +39 | 7 | Quarterfinals |
| 5 | Venezuela | 5 | 1 | 4 | 315 | 444 | −129 | 6 | |
| 6 | China | 5 | 0 | 5 | 318 | 466 | −148 | 5 | |

Source: FIBA
Rules for classification: 1) points; 2) head-to-head points; 3) head-to-head points difference; 4) head-to-head number of points scored.

6 August 2016
14:15

Boxscore

| Australia | 87–66 | France |
Scoring by quarter: 20–14, 16–19, 25–15, 26–18
| Pts: Mills 21; Rebs: Baynes 8 Asts: Dellavedova 10 | | Pts: Parker 18; Rebs: Gobert 6 Asts: Diaw, Heurtel 3 |

Carioca Arena 1, Rio de Janeiro
Attendance: 8,719
Referees: Cristiano Maranho (BRA), Steven Anderson (USA), Ferdinand Pascual (PHI)

8 August 2016
22:30

Boxscore

| France | 88–60 | China |
Scoring by quarter: 19–14, 23–9, 22–22, 24–15
| Pts: de Colo 19; Rebs: Batum 10; Asts: Parker 8 | | Pts: Yi 19; Rebs: Yi 6 Asts: Ding, Guo 4 |

Carioca Arena 1, Rio de Janeiro
Attendance: 6,360
Referees: Juan Carlos García (ESP), Roberto Vázquez (PUR), Piotr Pastusiak (POL)

10 August 2016
14:15

Boxscore

| Serbia | 75–76 | France |
Scoring by quarter: 17–26, 19–14, 24–17, 15–19
| Pts: Raduljica 16; Rebs: Jokić 7 Asts: Teodosić 9 | | Pts: de Colo 22; Rebs: Diaw 9 Asts: Diaw 9 |

Carioca Arena 1, Rio de Janeiro
Attendance: 6,901
Referees: Borys Ryzhyk (UKR), Stephen Seibel (CAN), Oļegs Latiševs (LAT)

12 August 2016
22:30

Boxscore

| France | 96–56 | Venezuela |
Scoring by quarter: 23–18, 19–12, 24–17, 30–9
| Pts: Lauvergne 17; Rebs: Kahudi 12; Asts: Heurtel 8 | | Pts: Echenique 12; Rebs: Vargas 7 Asts: Cox 4 |

Carioca Arena 1, Rio de Janeiro
Attendance: 7,312
Referees: Cristiano Maranho (BRA), Robert Lottermoser (GER), Ferdinand Pascual (PHI)

14 August 2016
14:15

Boxscore

| United States | 100–97 | France |
Scoring by quarter: 30–24, 25–22, 26–23, 19–28
| Pts: Thompson 30; Rebs: Durant 6 Asts: Irving 12 | | Pts: de Colo, Heurtel 18; Rebs: Heurtel 8 Asts: Heurtel 9 |

Carioca Arena 1, Rio de Janeiro
Attendance: 11,302
Referees: Borys Ryzhyk (UKR), José Reyes (MEX), Damir Javor (SLO)

Quarterfinal

17 August 2016
14:30

Boxscore

| Spain | 92–67 | France |
Scoring by quarter: 19–16, 24–14, 26–19, 23–18
| Pts: Mirotić 23; Rebs: Gasol 8 Asts: Navarro 5 | | Pts: Parker 14; Rebs: Gobert 12; Asts: Diaw 5 |

Carioca Arena 1, Rio de Janeiro
Attendance: 9,725
Referees: José Reese (MEX), Damir Javor (SLO), Oļegs Latiševs (LAT)

=== Women's tournament ===
France women's basketball team qualified for the Olympics with a quarterfinal victory at the 2016 FIBA World Olympic Qualifying Tournament in Nantes.

Team roster

The following is the France roster for the women's basketball tournament of the 2016 Summer Olympics

France women's national basketball team – 2016 Summer Olympics roster
Players
Coaches

| Pos. | No. | Name | Age – Date of birth | Height | Club |
|---|---|---|---|---|---|---|
| C | 4 | Isabelle Yacoubou (C) | 30 – 21 April 1986 | 1.90 m (6 ft 3 in) | Familia Schio | (Italy) |
| C | 5 | Endéné Miyem | 28 – 15 May 1988 | 1.88 m (6 ft 2 in) | Dynamo Kursk | (Russia) |
| C | 7 | Sandrine Gruda | 29 – 25 June 1987 | 1.93 m (6 ft 4 in) | UMMC Ekaterinburg | (Russia) |
| F | 10 | Sarah Michel | 27 – 10 January 1989 | 1.80 m (5 ft 11 in) | Basket Lattes | (France) |
| SF | 11 | Valériane Ayayi | 22 – 29 April 1994 | 1.84 m (6 ft 0 in) | Basket Lattes | (France) |
| C | 12 | Gaëlle Skrela | 33 – 24 January 1983 | 1.77 m (5 ft 10 in) | Basket Lattes | (France) |
| C | 16 | Héléna Ciak | 26 – 15 December 1989 | 1.97 m (6 ft 6 in) | CJM Bourges Basket | (France) |
| G | 17 | Marine Johannès | 21 – 21 January 1995 | 1.77 m (5 ft 10 in) | USO Mondeville | (France) |
| PG | 20 | Amel Bouderra | 27 – 26 March 1989 | 1.63 m (5 ft 4 in) | Flammes Carolo Basket | (France) |
| F | 21 | Laetitia Kamba | 29 – 10 January 1987 | 1.87 m (6 ft 2 in) | ESB Villeneuve-d'Ascq | (France) |
| G | 22 | Olivia Époupa | 22 – 30 April 1994 | 1.64 m (5 ft 5 in) | Toulouse Métropole Basket | (France) |
| C | 25 | Marielle Amant | 26 – 9 December 1989 | 1.90 m (6 ft 3 in) | ESB Villeneuve-d’Ascq | (France) |

Head coach

- (France) Valérie Garnier

Assistant coach(es)

- (France) Grégory Halin
- (France) Olivier Lafargue

Legend

- (C) Team captain
- Club – describes last
  club before the tournament
- Age – describes age
  on 6 August 2016

Group play

| Pos | Team | Pld | W | L | PF | PA | PD | Pts | Qualification |
|---|---|---|---|---|---|---|---|---|---|
| 1 | Australia | 5 | 5 | 0 | 400 | 345 | +55 | 10 | Quarter-finals |
| 2 | France | 5 | 3 | 2 | 344 | 343 | +1 | 8 (Note: Head-to-head record: France 3 pts, +8 PD; Turkey 3 pts, −2 PD; Japan 3 pts, −6 PD) | Quarter-finals |
| 3 | Turkey | 5 | 3 | 2 | 324 | 325 | −1 | 8 | Quarter-finals |
| 4 | Japan | 5 | 3 | 2 | 386 | 378 | +8 | 8 | Quarter-finals |
| 5 | Belarus | 5 | 1 | 4 | 347 | 361 | −14 | 6 | |
| 6 | Brazil (H) | 5 | 0 | 5 | 335 | 384 | −49 | 5 | |

Source: FIBA
Rules for classification: 1) points; 2) head-to-head points; 3) head-to-head points difference; 4) head-to-head number of points scored.
(H) Hosts
Notes:

6 August 2016
12:00

Boxscore

| Turkey | 39–55 | France |
Scoring by quarter: 16–8, 3–14, 16–19, 4–14
| Pts: Yılmaz 16; Rebs: Yılmaz 6 Asts: Vardarlı 5 | | Pts: Michel, Miyem 14; Rebs: Yacoubou 11; Asts: Epoupa 5 |

Youth Arena, Rio de Janeiro
Attendance: 2,042
Referees: Guilherme Locatelli (BRA), Scott Beker (AUS), Natalia Cuello (DOM)

7 August 2016
19:45

Boxscore

| France | 73–72 | Belarus |
Scoring by quarter: 14–22, 20–20, 18–11, 21–19
| Pts: Epoupa 16; Rebs: Michel 8 Asts: Epoupa 5 | | Pts: Likhtarovich 16; Rebs: Leuchanka 13; Asts: Harding 8 |

Youth Arena, Rio de Janeiro
Attendance: 2,075
Referees: Ferdinand Pascual (PHI), Duan Zhu (CHN), Vaughan Mayberry (AUS)

9 August 2016
12:15

Boxscore

| Australia | 89–71 | France |
Scoring by quarter: 21–19, 25–10, 23–21, 20–21
| Pts: Taylor 31; Rebs: Cambage 7 Asts: Taylor 9 | | Pts: Epoupa 15; Rebs: Epoupa 7 Asts: Bouderra 4 |

Youth Arena, Rio de Janeiro
Attendance: 1,481
Referees: Borys Ryzhyk (UKR), Duan Zhu (CHN), Hwang In-tae (KOR)

11 August 2016
15:30

Boxscore

| France | 74–64 | Brazil |
Scoring by quarter: 20–20, 15–9, 22–19, 17–16
| Pts: Skrela 18; Rebs: Gruda 10; Asts: Époupa 7 | | Pts: Dantas 21; Rebs: Dos Santos 10; Asts: three players 5 |

Youth Arena, Rio de Janeiro
Attendance: 3,128
Referees: Juan Carlos García (ESP), Karen Lasuik (CAN), Ferdinand Pascual (PHI)

13 August 2016
17:45

Boxscore

| Japan | 79–71 | France |
Scoring by quarter: 17–19, 23–13, 23–22, 16–17
| Pts: Yoshida 24; Rebs: Tokashiki 7 Asts: Yoshida 7 | | Pts: Epoupa, Yacoubou 14; Rebs: Gruda 9 Asts: Gruda 4 |

Youth Arena, Rio de Janeiro
Attendance: 3,351
Referees: Sreten Radović (CRO), Carlos Peruga (ESP), Carlos Júlio (ANG)

Quarterfinal

16 August 2016
22:15

Boxscore

| France | 68–63 | Canada |
Scoring by quarter: 16–25, 16–12, 18–13, 18–13
| Pts: Gruda 14; Rebs: Gruda 10; Asts: Époupa 6 | | Pts: Gaucher 15; Rebs: three players 5 Asts: Tatham 4 |

Carioca Arena 1, Rio de Janeiro
Attendance: 7,200
Referees: Sreten Radović (CRO), Vaughan Mayberry (AUS), Hwang In-tae (KOR)

Semifinal

18 August 2016
19:00

Boxscore

| France | 67–86 | United States |
Scoring by quarter: 15–19, 21–21, 8–25, 23–21
| Pts: Yacoubou 14; Rebs: Gruda 6 Asts: Michel 3 | | Pts: Taurasi 18; Rebs: Fowles 9 Asts: Taurasi 4 |

Carioca Arena 1, Rio de Janeiro
Attendance: 8,431
Referees: Ferdinand Pascual (PHI), Karen Lasuik (CAN), Duan Zhu (CHN)

Bronze medal match

20 August 2016
11:30

Boxscore

| France | 63–70 | Serbia (bronze) |
Scoring by quarter: 10–18, 17–9, 15–28, 21–15
| Pts: Miyem 18; Rebs: Yacoubou 10; Asts: Époupa 4 | | Pts: Milovanović 18; Rebs: Page 8 Asts: A. Dabović 5 |

Carioca Arena 1, Rio de Janeiro
Attendance: 9,039
Referees: Carlos Peruga (ESP), Anne Panther (GER), Natalia Cuello (DOM)

== Boxing ==
France has entered ten boxers (eight men and two women) to compete in the following weight classes into the Olympic boxing tournament. Mathieu Bauderlique was the only Frenchman finishing among the top two of their respective division in the AIBA Pro Boxing series, while 2012 Olympian Tony Yoka earned a lone outright Olympic berth in the super heavyweight bout at the 2015 World Championships. Three more boxers (Oumiha, Assomo, and Biongolo) had claimed their Olympic spots at the 2016 European Qualification Tournament in Samsun, Turkey.

Sarah Ourahmoune and Estelle Mossely were confirmed as France's first ever female Olympic boxers with a quarterfinal victory each in women's flyweight and lightweight division, respectively, at the World Championships in Astana, Kazakhstan. Meanwhile, Souleymane Cissokho, Elie Konki, and Hassan Amzile secured additional Olympic places on the French roster at the 2016 AIBA World Qualifying Tournament in Baku, Azerbaijan.

Men

| Athlete | Event | Round of 32 | Round of 16 | Quarterfinals | Semifinals | Final | |
| Athlete | Event | Opposition Result | Opposition Result | Opposition Result | Opposition Result | Opposition Result | Rank |
|---|---|---|---|---|---|---|---|
| Elie Konki | Flyweight | Touba (GER); W 3–0 | Aloyan (RUS); L 0–3 | did not advance | | | |
| Sofiane Oumiha | Lightweight | Lopéz (HON); W 3–0 | Ruenroeng (THA); W TKO | Selimov (AZE); W 3–0 | Otgondalai (MGL); W 3–0 | Conceição (BRA); L 0–3 | 2nd place, silver medalist(s) |
| Hassan Amzile | Light welterweight | Junias (NAM); W 3–0 | Sotomayor (AZE); L 1–2 | did not advance | | | |
| Souleymane Cissokho | Welterweight | Bacskai (HUN); W 3–0 | Baghirov (AZE); W 3–0 | Adi (THA); W 3–0 | Yeleussinov (KAZ); L 0–3 | Did not advance | 3rd place, bronze medalist(s) |
| Christian Mbilli Asomo | Middleweight | Mytrofanov (UKR); W 3–0 | Delgado (ECU); W 2–1 | López (CUB); L 0–3 | did not advance | | |
| Mathieu Bauderlique | Light heavyweight | Bye | Carrillo (COL); W 3–0 | Mina (ECU); W TKO | La Cruz (CUB); L 0–3 | Did not advance | 3rd place, bronze medalist(s) |
| Paul Omba-Biongolo | Heavyweight | —N/a | Abdullayev (AZE); L TKO | did not advance | | | |
| Tony Yoka | Super heavyweight | Bye | Laurent (ISV); W 3–0 | Ishaish (JOR); W 3–0 | Hrgović (CRO); W 2–1 | Joyce (GBR); W 2–1 | 1st place, gold medalist(s) |

Women

| Athlete | Event | Round of 16 | Quarterfinals | Semifinals | Final | |
| Athlete | Event | Opposition Result | Opposition Result | Opposition Result | Opposition Result | Rank |
|---|---|---|---|---|---|---|
| Sarah Ourahmoune | Flyweight | Ez-Zahraoui (MAR); W 3–0 | Shekerbekova (KAZ); W 3–0 | Valencia (COL); W 2–0 | Adams (GBR); L 0–3 | 2nd place, silver medalist(s) |
| Estelle Mossely | Lightweight | Bye | Testa (ITA); W 3–0 | Belyakova (RUS); W TKO | Yin Jh (CHN); W 2–1 | 1st place, gold medalist(s) |

== Canoeing ==
=== Slalom ===
French canoeists have qualified a maximum of one boat in each of the following classes through the 2015 ICF Canoe Slalom World Championships. The roster of French slalom canoeists, led by London 2012 Olympians Gauthier Klauss and Matthieu Péché, was announced on 10 April 2016 as a result of their top performances at the Olympic Trials in Pau.

| Athlete | Event | Preliminary | | | | | | Semifinal | | Final | |
| Athlete | Event | Run 1 | Rank | Run 2 | Rank | Best | Rank | Time | Rank | Time | Rank |
|---|---|---|---|---|---|---|---|---|---|---|---|
| Denis Gargaud Chanut | Men's C-1 | 102.03 | 11 | 93.48 | 2 | 93.48 | 2 Q | 98.06 | 3 Q | 94.17 | 1st place, gold medalist(s) |
| Gauthier Klauss; Matthieu Péché | Men's C-2 | 103.35 | 3 | 102.43 | 1 | 102.43 | 2 Q | 110.19 | 5 Q | 103.24 | 3rd place, bronze medalist(s) |
| Sébastien Combot | Men's K-1 | 89.13 | 5 | 88.94 | 5 | 88.94 | 9 Q | 94.59 | 8 Q | 92.55 | 8 |
| Marie-Zélia Lafont | Women's K-1 | 110.52 | 11 | 118.67 | 13 | 110.52 | 16 | did not advance | | | |

=== Sprint ===
French canoeists have qualified one boat in each of the following events through the 2015 ICF Canoe Sprint World Championships. The sprint canoeing team was named as part of the second batch of nominated athletes to the Olympic roster on 7 June 2016.

Men

| Athlete | Event | Heats | | Semifinals | | Final | |
| Athlete | Event | Time | Rank | Time | Rank | Time | Rank |
|---|---|---|---|---|---|---|---|
| Thomas Simart | C-1 200 m | 40.415 | 1 Q | 40.670 | 2 FA | 40.180 | 8 |
| Adrien Bart | C-1 1000 m | 4:10.043 | 5 Q | 4:08.593 | 5 FB | 4:00.911 | 10 |
| Maxime Beaumont | K-1 200 m | 34.322 | 1 Q | 34.398 | 1 FA | 35.362 | 2nd place, silver medalist(s) |
| Cyrille Carré | K-1 1000 m | 3:36.322 | 3 Q | 3:38.115 | 6 FB | 3:36.606 | 13 |
| Maxime Beaumont; Sébastien Jouve | K-2 200 m | 31.855 | 3 Q | 32.526 | 2 FA | 32.699 | 7 |
| Étienne Hubert; Arnaud Hybois | K-2 1000 m | 3:25.654 | 4 Q | 3:21.100 | 5 FB | 3:19.415 | 10 |
| Cyrille Carré; Étienne Hubert; Arnaud Hybois; Sébastien Jouve | K-4 1000 m | 3:02.376 | 5 Q | 3:00.896 | 3 FA | 3:07.488 | 7 |

Women

| Athlete | Event | Heats | | Semifinals | | Final | |
| Athlete | Event | Time | Rank | Time | Rank | Time | Rank |
|---|---|---|---|---|---|---|---|
| Sarah Guyot | K-1 200 m | 40.317 | 1 Q | 40.516 | 2 FA | 40.894 | 5 |
| Manon Hostens; Léa Jamelot; Amandine Lhote; Sarah Troël | K-4 500 m | 1:37.03 | 6 Q | 1:39.06 | 6 FB | 1:41.069 | 12 |

Qualification Legend: FA = Qualify to final (medal); FB = Qualify to final B (non-medal)

== Cycling ==
=== Road ===
French riders qualified for the following quota places in the men's and women's Olympic road race by virtue of their top 15 final national ranking in the 2015 UCI World Tour (for men) and top 22 in the UCI World Ranking (for women). The women's road cycling team (Cordon & Ferrand-Prévot) was named as part of the second batch of nominated athletes to the Olympic roster on 7 June 2016, with four male cyclists (Alaphilippe, Bardet, Barguil, & Pinot, later replaced by Vuillermoz) joining them on 13 July.

Men

| Athlete | Event | Time | Rank |
|---|---|---|---|
| Julian Alaphilippe | Road race | 6:10:27 | 4 |
| Julian Alaphilippe | Time trial | 1:24:39.99 | 32 |
| Romain Bardet | Road race | 6:16:17 | 24 |
| Warren Barguil | Road race | did not finish | |
| Alexis Vuillermoz | Road race | 6:16:17 | 23 |
| Alexis Vuillermoz | Time trial | 1:20:43.87 | 29 |

Women

| Athlete | Event | Time | Rank |
|---|---|---|---|
| Audrey Cordon | Road race | 4:01:04 | 37 |
| Audrey Cordon | Time trial | 49:32.87 | 24 |
| Pauline Ferrand-Prévot | Road race | 3:56:34 | 26 |

=== Track ===
Following the completion of the 2016 UCI Track Cycling World Championships, French riders accumulated spots in both men's and women's team sprint, as well as the men's and women's omnium. As a result of their place in the men's and women's team sprint, France has won the right to enter two riders in both men's and women's sprint and men's and women's keirin.

The French Cycling Federation announced the track cycling squad for the Olympics on 5 April 2016, including 2012 double silver medalist Grégory Baugé in the men's sprint.

Sprint

| Athlete | Event | Qualification | | Round 1 | Repechage 1 | Round 2 | Repechage 2 | Quarterfinals | Semifinals | Final / BM | |
| Athlete | Event | Time Speed (km/h) | Rank | Opposition Time Speed (km/h) | Opposition Time Speed (km/h) | Opposition Time Speed (km/h) | Opposition Time Speed (km/h) | Opposition Time Speed (km/h) | Opposition Time Speed (km/h) | Opposition Time Speed (km/h) | Rank |
|---|---|---|---|---|---|---|---|---|---|---|---|
| Grégory Baugé | Men's sprint | 9.807; 73.416 | 6 Q | Kelemen (CZE); W 10.214; 70.491 | Bye | Hoogland (NED); W 10.103; 71.265 | Bye | Dmitriev (RUS); L, L | Did not advance | 5th place final Eilers (GER); Xu C (CHN); Constable (AUS); L | 7 |
| François Pervis | Men's sprint | 9.898; 72.741 | 11 Q | Hoogland (NED); L | Puerta (COL); Sarnecki (POL); L | did not advance | | | | | |
| Sandie Clair | Women's sprint | 11.517; 62.516 | 25 | did not advance | | | | | | | |
| Virginie Cueff | Women's sprint | 11.099; 64.870 | 16 Q | Lee W S (HKG); L | Morton (AUS); Gong Jj (CHN); W 11.496; 62.630 | James (GBR); L | Krupeckaitė (LTU); Hansen (NZL); L | did not advance | | 9th place final Hansen (NZL); Meares (AUS); Welte (GER); L | 12 |

Team sprint

| Athlete | Event | Qualification | | Semifinals | | Final | |
| Athlete | Event | Time Speed (km/h) | Rank | Opposition Time Speed (km/h) | Rank | Opposition Time Speed (km/h) | Rank |
|---|---|---|---|---|---|---|---|
| Grégory Baugé; Michaël D'Almeida; François Pervis | Men's team sprint | 43.185; 62.521 | 4 Q | Poland; W 43.153; 62.568 | 3 FB | Australia; W 43.143; 62.582 | 3rd place, bronze medalist(s) |
| Sandie Clair; Virginie Cueff | Women's team sprint | 33.625; 53.531 | 6 Q | Germany; L 33.517; 53.704 | 6 | did not advance | |

Qualification legend: FA=Gold medal final; FB=Bronze medal final

Keirin

| Athlete | Event | 1st Round | Repechage | 2nd Round | Final |
| Athlete | Event | Rank | Rank | Rank | Rank |
|---|---|---|---|---|---|
| Michaël D'Almeida | Men's keirin | 1 Q | Bye | 6 | 8 |
| François Pervis | Men's keirin | 3 R | 1 Q | 5 | 11 |
| Sandie Clair | Women's keirin | 6 R | 3 | did not advance | |
| Virginie Cueff | Women's keirin | DNF R | 3 | did not advance | |

Omnium

| Athlete | Event | Scratch race | | Individual pursuit | | | Elimination race | | Time trial | | | Flying lap | | | Points race | | Total points | Rank |
| Athlete | Event | Rank | Points | Time | Rank | Points | Rank | Points | Time | Rank | Points | Time | Rank | Points | Points | Rank | Total points | Rank |
|---|---|---|---|---|---|---|---|---|---|---|---|---|---|---|---|---|---|---|
| Thomas Boudat | Men's omnium | 3 | 36 | 4:19.918 | 5 | 32 | 2 | 38 | 1:04.227 | 11 | 20 | 13.272 | 9 | 24 | 22 | 6 | 172 | 5 |
| Laurie Berthon | Women's omnium | 8 | 26 | 3:40.180 | 12 | 18 | 9 | 24 | 35.275 | 3 | 36 | 13.903 | 3 | 36 | 23 | 9 | 163 | 10 |

=== Mountain biking ===
French mountain bikers qualified for three men's and two women's quota places into the Olympic cross-country race, as a result of the nation's second-place finish for men and fourth for women, respectively, in the UCI Olympic Ranking List of 25 May 2016. The mountain biking team was named as part of the second batch of nominated athletes to the Olympic roster on 7 June 2016, with double Olympic champion Julien Absalon remarkably going to his fourth Games.

| Athlete | Event | Time | Rank |
|---|---|---|---|
| Julien Absalon | Men's cross-country | 1:36:43 | 8 |
| Victor Koretzky | Men's cross-country | 1:37:27 | 10 |
| Maxime Marotte | Men's cross-country | 1:35:01 | 4 |
| Perrine Clauzel | Women's cross-country | 1:42:23 | 26 |
| Pauline Ferrand-Prévot | Women's cross-country | did not finish | |

=== BMX ===
French riders qualified for three men's and one women's quota place in BMX at the Olympics, as a result of the nation's fourth-place finish for men and fifth for women in the UCI Olympic Ranking List of 31 May 2016. The BMX riders, led by London 2012 Olympian Joris Daudet, were named as part of the second batch of nominated athletes to the Olympic roster on 7 June 2016.

| Athlete | Event | Seeding | | Quarterfinal | | Semifinal | | Final | |
| Athlete | Event | Result | Rank | Points | Rank | Points | Rank | Result | Rank |
|---|---|---|---|---|---|---|---|---|---|
| Joris Daudet | Men's BMX | 34.617 | 1 | 18 | 6 | did not advance | | | |
| Amidou Mir | Men's BMX | 35.248 | 11 | 14 | 5 | did not advance | | | |
| Jérémy Rencurel | Men's BMX | 35.884 | 22 | 28 | 7 | did not advance | | | |
| Manon Valentino | Women's BMX | 36.377 | 12 | —N/a | | 12 | 4 Q | 2:41.109 | 8 |

== Diving ==
French divers qualified for the following individual and synchronized team spots at the 2016 Summer Olympics through the World Championships and the FINA World Cup series. The diving squad was selected as part of the first batch of nominated athletes to the Olympic roster on 27 April 2016.

| Athlete | Event | Preliminaries | | Semifinals | | Final | |
| Athlete | Event | Points | Rank | Points | Rank | Points | Rank |
|---|---|---|---|---|---|---|---|
| Matthieu Rosset | Men's 3 m springboard | 373.40 | 23 | did not advance | | | |
| Benjamin Auffret | Men's 10 m platform | 470.45 | 5 Q | 477.00 | 4 Q | 507.35 | 4 |
| Laura Marino | Women's 10 m platform | 289.35 | 19 | did not advance | | | |

== Equestrian ==
French equestrians have qualified a full squad in the team dressage, eventing and jumping competitions through the 2014 FEI World Equestrian Games, the 2015 European Dressage Championships, and the 2015 European Eventing Championships.

=== Dressage ===
| Athlete | Horse | Event | Grand Prix | | Grand Prix Special | | Grand Prix Freestyle | | Overall | |
| Athlete | Horse | Event | Score | Rank | Score | Rank | Technical | Artistic | Score | Rank |
|---|---|---|---|---|---|---|---|---|---|---|
| Stéphanie Brieussel | Amorak | Individual | 65.114 # | 55 | did not advance | | | | | |
| Ludovic Henry | After You | Individual | 69.214 | 40 | did not advance | | | | | |
| Karen Tebar | Don Luis | Individual | 75.029 | 18 Q | 72.773 | 25 | did not advance | | | |
| Pierre Volla | Badinda Altena | Individual | 71.500 | 30 Q | 65.742 | 31 | did not advance | | | |
| Stéphanie Brieussel; Ludovic Henry; Karen Tebar; Pierre Volla | See above | Team | 71.914 | 8 | did not advance | | —N/a | | did not advance | |

=== Eventing ===
| Athlete | Horse | Event | Dressage | | Cross-country | | | Jumping | | | | | | Total | |
| Athlete | Horse | Event | Dressage | | Cross-country | | | Qualifier | | | Final | | | Total | |
| Athlete | Horse | Event | Penalties | Rank | Penalties | Total | Rank | Penalties | Total | Rank | Penalties | Total | Rank | Penalties | Rank |
|---|---|---|---|---|---|---|---|---|---|---|---|---|---|---|---|
| Karim Laghouag | Entebbe | Individual | 43.40 # | 14 | 50.40 # | 93.40 # | 30 | 1.00 | 94.40 # | 28 | did not advance | | | | |
| Mathieu Lemoine | Bart | Individual | 39.20 | 3 | 14.40 | 53.60 | 10 | 8.00 | 61.60 | 9 Q | 8.00 | 69.60 | 15 | 69.60 | 15 |
| Astier Nicolas | Piaf de B'Neville | Individual | 42.00 | 11 | 0.00 | 42.00 | 3 | 0.00 | 42.00 | 2 Q | 6.00 | 48.00 | 2 | 48.00 | 2nd place, silver medalist(s) |
| Thibaut Vallette | Qing du Briot | Individual | 41.00 | 6 | 24.40 | 65.40 | 18 | 0.00 | 65.40 | 14 Q | 4.00 | 69.40 | 13 | 69.40 | 13 |
| Karim Laghouag; Mathieu Lemoine; Astier Nicolas; Thibaut Vallette | See above | Team | 122.20 | 2 | 38.80 | 161.00 | 3 | 8.00 | 169.00 | 1 | —N/a | | | 169.00 | 1st place, gold medalist(s) |

"#" indicates that the score of this rider does not count in the team competition, since only the best three results of a team are counted.

=== Jumping ===
| Athlete | Horse | Event | Qualification | | | | | | | | Final | | | | | Total | |
| Athlete | Horse | Event | Round 1 | | Round 2 | | | Round 3 | | | Round A | | Round B | | | Total | |
| Athlete | Horse | Event | Penalties | Rank | Penalties | Total | Rank | Penalties | Total | Rank | Penalties | Rank | Penalties | Total | Rank | Penalties | Rank |
|---|---|---|---|---|---|---|---|---|---|---|---|---|---|---|---|---|---|
| Roger-Yves Bost | Sydney Une Prince | Individual | 0 | =1 Q | 1 | 1 | =12 Q | 1 | 2 | 5 Q | 0 | =1 Q | 5 | 5 | =16 | 5 | =16 |
| Pénélope Leprevost | Flora de Mariposa | Individual | 47 # | =68 | 0 | 47 | 68^{TO} | did not compete | | | did not advance | | | | | | |
| Philippe Rozier | Rahotep de Toscane | Individual | 0 | =1 Q | 4 # | 4 | =28 Q | 1 | 5 | =13 Q | 4 | =16 Q | 9 | 13 | 23 | 13 | 23 |
| Kevin Staut | Rêveur de Hurtebise *HDC | Individual | 4 | =27 Q | 0 | 4 | =15 Q | 0 | 4 | =7 Q | 4 | =16 Q | 8 | 12 | 22 | 12 | 22 |
| Roger-Yves Bost; Pénélope Leprevost; Philippe Rozier; Kevin Staut | See above | Team | 4 | =3 Q | 1 | —N/a | =5 Q | 2 | 3 | 1 | —N/a | | | | | 3 | 1st place, gold medalist(s) |

"#" indicates that the score of this rider does not count in the team competition, since only the best three results of a team are counted.

== Fencing ==
French fencers have qualified a full squad each in the men's team foil, men's team épée, and women's team sabre by virtue of their top 4 national finish in the FIE Olympic Team Rankings, while the women's épée team picked up a spare berth freed by Africa for being the next highest ranking team. Sabre fencer Vincent Anstett, along with 2012 Olympic foilists Astrid Guyart and Ysaora Thibus had claimed their spots on the French team by finishing among the top 14 in the FIE Adjusted Official Rankings.

The men's foil fencers (Cadot, Le Pechoux, & Lefort), along with the épée teams (both men and women), were named to the Olympic roster on 26 May 2016. The women's sabre team rounded out the fencing selection on 2 June 2016.

The fencing team was officially named as part of the second batch of nominated athletes to the Olympic roster on 7 June 2016.

Men

| Athlete | Event | Round of 64 | Round of 32 | Round of 16 | Quarterfinal | Semifinal | Final / BM | |
| Athlete | Event | Opposition Score | Opposition Score | Opposition Score | Opposition Score | Opposition Score | Opposition Score | Rank |
|---|---|---|---|---|---|---|---|---|
| Yannick Borel | Épée | Bye | Rédli (HUN); W 15–9 | Kauter (SUI); W 15–14 | Steffen (SUI); L 10–15 | did not advance | | |
| Gauthier Grumier | Épée | Bye | Schwantes (BRA); W 15–7 | Fayez (EGY); W 15–9 | Minobe (JPN); W 15–8 | Imre (HUN); L 13–15 | Steffen (SUI); W 15–11 | 3rd place, bronze medalist(s) |
| Daniel Jérent | Épée | Bye | F Limardo (VEN); L 14–15 | did not advance | | | | |
| Yannick Borel; Gauthier Grumier; Daniel Jérent | Team épée | —N/a | | Bye | Venezuela; W 45–29 | Hungary; W 45–40 | Italy; W 45–31 | 1st place, gold medalist(s) |
| Jérémy Cadot | Foil | Bye | Cassarà (ITA); L 14–15 | did not advance | | | | |
| Erwann Le Péchoux | Foil | Bye | Lei S (CHN); W 15–9 | Meinhardt (USA); L 14–15 | did not advance | | | |
| Enzo Lefort | Foil | Bye | Joppich (GER); L 13–15 | did not advance | | | | |
| Jérémy Cadot; Erwann Le Péchoux; Enzo Lefort; Jean-Paul Tony Helissey | Team foil | —N/a | | | China; W 45–42 | Italy; W 45–30 | Russia; L 41–45 | 2nd place, silver medalist(s) |
| Vincent Anstett | Sabre | —N/a | Tokunan (JPN); W 15–13 | Vũ T A (VIE); W 15–8 | Abedini (IRI); L 13–15 | did not advance | | |

Women

| Athlete | Event | Round of 64 | Round of 32 | Round of 16 | Quarterfinal | Semifinal | Final / BM | |
| Athlete | Event | Opposition Score | Opposition Score | Opposition Score | Opposition Score | Opposition Score | Opposition Score | Rank |
|---|---|---|---|---|---|---|---|---|
| Marie-Florence Candassamy | Épée | Simeão (BRA); W 15–6 | Xu Aq (CHN); W 15–8 | Moellhausen (BRA); L 12–15 | did not advance | | | |
| Auriane Mallo | Épée | Nguyễn T N H (VIE); W 15–7 | Brânză (ROU); L 8–15 | did not advance | | | | |
| Lauren Rembi | Épée | Bye | Gherman (ROU); W 13–10 | Kryvytska (UKR); W 9–7 | Moellhausen (BRA); W 15–12 | Szász (HUN); L 10–6 | Sun Yw (CHN); L 13–15 | 4 |
| Marie-Florence Candassamy; Auriane Mallo; Lauren Rembi | Team épée | —N/a | | Bye | Russia; L 41–44 | Classification semi-final United States; L 28–32 | 7th place final Ukraine; W 45–38 | 7 |
| Astrid Guyart | Foil | Bye | Leleiko (UKR); W 15–9 | Prescod (USA); W 14–11 | Deriglazova (RUS); L 6–15 | did not advance | | |
| Ysaora Thibus | Foil | Bye | Karamete (TUR); W 15–6 | Le Hl (CHN); W 15–13 | Shanaeva (RUS); L 10–15 | did not advance | | |
| Cécilia Berder | Sabre | Bye | Pérez Maurice (ARG); W 15–6 | Muhammad (USA); W 15–12 | Velikaya (RUS); L 10–15 | did not advance | | |
| Manon Brunet | Sabre | Bye | Hwang S-a (KOR); W 15–11 | Márton (HUN); W 15–12 | Besbes (TUN); W 15–14 | Velikaya (RUS); L 14–15 | Kharlan (UKR); L 10–15 | 4 |
| Charlotte Lembach | Sabre | Bye | Vecchi (ITA); W 15–11 | Velikaya (RUS); L 14–15 | did not advance | | | |
| Cécilia Berder; Manon Brunet; Charlotte Lembach | Team sabre | —N/a | | | Italy; L 36–45 | Classification semi-final South Korea; L 40–45 | 7th place final Mexico; L 38–45 | 8 |

== Football ==
=== Women's tournament ===
France's women's football team qualified for the Olympics by reaching the top three for European teams at the 2015 FIFA Women's World Cup in Canada.

Team roster

Head coach: Philippe Bergeroo

France named a squad of 18 players and 4 alternates for the tournament, which was announced on 7 July 2016. Prior to the tournament, Laura Georges withdrew injured and was replaced on 18 July 2016 by Sakina Karchaoui, who was initially selected as an alternate player. Sandie Toletti subsequently filled the vacant alternate spot.

| No. | Pos. | Player | Date of birth (age) | Caps | Goals | Club |
|---|---|---|---|---|---|---|
| 1 | GK | Méline Gérard | 30 May 1990 (aged 26) | 4 | 0 | (French Football Federation) Olympique Lyon |
| 2 | DF | Griedge Mbock Bathy | 26 February 1995 (aged 21) | 9 | 0 | (French Football Federation) Olympique Lyon |
| 3 | DF | Wendie Renard (captain) | 20 July 1990 (aged 26) | 71 | 17 | (French Football Federation) Olympique Lyon |
| 4 | DF | Sakina Karchaoui | 26 January 1996 (aged 20) | 1 | 0 | (French Football Federation) Montpellier HSC |
| 5 | DF | Sabrina Delannoy | 18 May 1986 (aged 30) | 26 | 2 | (French Football Federation) Paris Saint-Germain |
| 6 | MF | Amandine Henry | 28 September 1989 (aged 26) | 48 | 6 | (United States Soccer Federation) Portland Thorns |
| 7 | DF | Amel Majri | 25 January 1993 (aged 23) | 20 | 3 | (French Football Federation) Olympique Lyon |
| 8 | DF | Jessica Houara | 29 September 1987 (aged 28) | 41 | 3 | (French Football Federation) Olympique Lyon |
| 9 | FW | Eugénie Le Sommer | 18 May 1989 (aged 27) | 116 | 52 | (French Football Federation) Olympique Lyon |
| 10 | MF | Camille Abily | 5 December 1984 (aged 31) | 145 | 29 | (French Football Federation) Olympique Lyon |
| 11 | MF | Claire Lavogez | 18 June 1994 (aged 22) | 13 | 1 | (French Football Federation) Olympique Lyon |
| 12 | FW | Élodie Thomis | 13 August 1986 (aged 29) | 116 | 31 | (French Football Federation) Olympique Lyon |
| 13 | FW | Kadidiatou Diani | 1 April 1995 (aged 21) | 5 | 1 | (French Football Federation) FCF Juvisy |
| 14 | MF | Louisa Cadamuro | 23 January 1987 (aged 29) | 125 | 32 | (French Football Federation) Olympique Lyon |
| 15 | MF | Élise Bussaglia | 24 September 1985 (aged 30) | 143 | 26 | (German Football Association) VfL Wolfsburg |
| 16 | GK | Sarah Bouhaddi | 17 October 1986 (aged 29) | 93 | 0 | (French Football Federation) Olympique Lyon |
| 17 | MF | Kheira Hamraoui | 13 January 1990 (aged 26) | 22 | 1 | (French Football Federation) Olympique Lyon |
| 18 | FW | Marie-Laure Delie | 29 January 1988 (aged 28) | 90 | 62 | (French Football Federation) Paris Saint-Germain |

Group play

| Pos | Team | Pld | W | D | L | GF | GA | GD | Pts | Qualification |
|---|---|---|---|---|---|---|---|---|---|---|
| 1 | United States | 3 | 2 | 1 | 0 | 5 | 2 | +3 | 7 | Quarter-finals |
| 2 | France | 3 | 2 | 0 | 1 | 7 | 1 | +6 | 6 | Quarter-finals |
| 3 | New Zealand | 3 | 1 | 0 | 2 | 1 | 5 | −4 | 3 | |
| 4 | Colombia | 3 | 0 | 1 | 2 | 2 | 7 | −5 | 1 | |

Source: Rio2016 & FIFA
Rules for classification: Tiebreakers
3 August 2016
22:00

| France | 4–0 | Colombia |
|---|---|---|
| C. Arias 2' (o.g.); Le Sommer 14'; Abily 42'; Majri 82' | Report (Rio2016); Report (FIFA) |

Mineirão, Belo Horizonte
Attendance: 6,847
Referee: Ri Hyang-ok (North Korea)

6 August 2016
17:00

| United States | 1–0 | France |
|---|---|---|
| Lloyd 64' | Report (Rio2016); Report (FIFA) |

Mineirão, Belo Horizonte
Attendance: 11,782
Referee: Claudia Umpierrez (Uruguay)

9 August 2016
19:00

| New Zealand | 0–3 | France |
|---|---|---|
| | Report (Rio2016); Report (FIFA) | Le Sommer 38'; Cadamuro 63', 90+2' (pen.) |

Itaipava Arena Fonte Nova, Salvador
Attendance: 7,350
Referee: Lucila Venegas (Mexico)

Quarterfinal

12 August 2016
19:00

| Canada | 1–0 | France |
|---|---|---|
| Schmidt 56' | Report (Rio2016); Report (FIFA) |

Arena Corinthians, São Paulo
Attendance: 38,688
Referee: Claudia Umpierrez (Uruguay)

== Golf ==
France has entered four golfers (two per gender) into the Olympic tournament. Grégory Bourdy (world no. 112), Julien Quesne (world no. 123), Karine Icher (world no. 60), and Gwladys Nocera (world no. 134) qualified directly among the top 60 players for their respective individual events based on the IGF World Rankings as of 11 July 2016.

| Athlete | Event | Round 1 | Round 2 | Round 3 | Round 4 | Total | | |
| Athlete | Event | Score | Score | Score | Score | Score | Par | Rank |
|---|---|---|---|---|---|---|---|---|
| Grégory Bourdy | Men's | 67 | 69 | 72 | 73 | 281 | −3 | =21 |
| Julien Quesne | Men's | 71 | 79 | 72 | 71 | 293 | +9 | =55 |
| Karine Icher | Women's | 73 | 72 | 73 | 76 | 294 | +10 | =44 |
| Gwladys Nocera | Women's | 73 | 71 | 74 | 72 | 290 | +6 | =39 |

== Gymnastics ==
=== Artistic ===
France has fielded a full squad of ten gymnasts (five men and five women) into the Olympic competition. Both men's and women's squads had claimed one of the remaining four spots each in the team all-around at the Olympic Test Event in Rio de Janeiro. The French Olympic Committee named the men's and women's artistic gymnastics teams on 27 June 2016.

Men
Team

| Athlete | Event | Qualification | | | | | | | | Final | | | | | | | |
| Athlete | Event | Apparatus | | | | | | Total | Rank | Apparatus | | | | | | Total | Rank |
| Athlete | Event | F | PH | R | V | PB | HB | Total | Rank | F | PH | R | V | PB | HB | Total | Rank |
|---|---|---|---|---|---|---|---|---|---|---|---|---|---|---|---|---|---|
| Samir Aït Saïd | Team | —N/a | | 15.533 Q* | 12.866 | —N/a | | | | did not advance | | | | | | | |
| Axel Augis | Team | 14.033 | 14.500 | 14.333 | 13.166 | 15.300 | 14.700 | 86.032 | 23 Q | did not advance | | | | | | | |
| Julien Gobaux | Team | 13.066 | 14.233 | 14.500 | 13.700 | 14.766 | 14.300 | 84.565 | 29 | did not advance | | | | | | | |
| Danny Rodrigues | Team | —N/a | 13.133 | 15.266 Q | —N/a | 14.233 | 13.433 | —N/a | | did not advance | | | | | | | |
| Cyril Tommasone | Team | 13.966 | 15.650 Q | —N/a | | 14.100 | —N/a | | | did not advance | | | | | | | |
| Total | Team | 41.065 | 44.383 | 45.299 | 39.732 | 44.299 | 42.433 | 257.211 | 12 | did not advance | | | | | | | |

Individual finals

| Athlete | Event | Apparatus | | | | | | Total | Rank |
| Athlete | Event | F | PH | R | V | PB | HB | Total | Rank |
|---|---|---|---|---|---|---|---|---|---|
| Samir Aït Saïd | Rings | Withdrew due to injury | | | | | | | |
| Axel Augis | All-around | 13.933 | 13.100 | 13.933 | 14.266 | 14.766 | 12.900 | 82.898 | 21 |
| Cyril Tommasone | Pommel horse | —N/a | 15.600 | —N/a | | | | 15.600 | 4 |
| Danny Rodrigues | Rings | —N/a | | 15.233 | —N/a | | | 15.233 | 7 |

Women
Team

| Athlete | Event | Qualification | | | | | | Final | | | | | |
| Athlete | Event | Apparatus | | | | Total | Rank | Apparatus | | | | Total | Rank |
| Athlete | Event | V | UB | BB | F | Total | Rank | V | UB | BB | F | Total | Rank |
|---|---|---|---|---|---|---|---|---|---|---|---|---|---|
| Marine Boyer | Team | 14.200 | —N/a | 14.600 Q | 13.233 | —N/a | | did not advance | | | | | |
| Marine Brevet | Team | 14.133 | 14.333 | 14.166 | 13.933 | 56.565 | 16 Q | did not advance | | | | | |
| Loan His | Team | —N/a | 13.900 | —N/a | | | | did not advance | | | | | |
| Oréane Lechenault | Team | 12.300 | 13.166 | 13.633 | 13.666 | 52.765 | 46 | did not advance | | | | | |
| Louise Vanhille | Team | 13.966 | 14.866 | 13.633 | 13.300 | 55.765 | 21 Q | did not advance | | | | | |
| Total | Team | 42.299 | 43.099 | 42.399 | 40.899 | 168.696 | 11 | did not advance | | | | | |

Individual finals

| Athlete | Event | Apparatus | | | | Total | Rank |
| Athlete | Event | V | UB | BB | F | Total | Rank |
|---|---|---|---|---|---|---|---|
| Marine Boyer | Balance beam | —N/a | | 14.600 | —N/a | 14.600 | 4 |
| Marine Brevet | All-around | 14.166 | 14.300 | 14.133 | 14.000 | 56.599 | 15 |
| Louise Vanhille | All-around | 14.000 | 14.233 | 13.200 | 13.233 | 54.666 | 20 |

=== Rhythmic ===
France has qualified one rhythmic gymnast for the individual all-around by finishing in the top 15 at the 2015 World Championships in Stuttgart, Germany.

| Athlete | Event | Qualification | | | | | | Final | | | | | |
| Athlete | Event | Hoop | Ball | Clubs | Ribbon | Total | Rank | Hoop | Ball | Clubs | Ribbon | Total | Rank |
|---|---|---|---|---|---|---|---|---|---|---|---|---|---|
| Kseniya Moustafaeva | Individual | 17.600 | 17.516 | 17.500 | 17.366 | 69.982 | 10 Q | 17.700 | 16.833 | 16.916 | 16.741 | 68.240 | 10 |

=== Trampoline ===
France has qualified one gymnast in the men's trampoline by virtue of a top eight finish at the 2015 World Championships in Odense, Denmark. Meanwhile, a spare Olympic berth freed by the Tripartite Commission had been awarded to the French female gymnast, as the next highest from the eligible NOC on the individual ranking list at the 2016 Olympic Test Event in Rio de Janeiro. The French Olympic Committee had selected Sébastien Martiny and Marine Jurbert to compete in both men's and women's trampoline, respectively, at the Games.

| Athlete | Event | Qualification | | Final | |
| Athlete | Event | Score | Rank | Score | Rank |
|---|---|---|---|---|---|
| Sébastien Martiny | Men's | 106.230 | 10 | did not advance | |
| Marine Jurbert | Women's | 96.760 | 14 | did not advance | |

== Handball ==
Summary

Key:
- ET – After extra time
- P – Match decided by penalty-shootout.

| Team | Event | Group Stage | | | | | | Quarterfinal | Semifinal | Final / BM | |
| Team | Event | Opposition Score | Opposition Score | Opposition Score | Opposition Score | Opposition Score | Rank | Opposition Score | Opposition Score | Opposition Score | Rank |
|---|---|---|---|---|---|---|---|---|---|---|---|
| France men's | Men's tournament | Tunisia; W 25–23 | Qatar; W 35–20 | Argentina; W 31–24 | Croatia; L 28–29 | Denmark; W 33–30 | 2 | Brazil; W 34–27 | Germany; W 29–28 | Denmark; L 26–28 | 2nd place, silver medalist(s) |
| France women's | Women's tournament | Netherlands; W 18–14 | Russia; L 25–26 | Argentina; W 27–11 | South Korea; W 21–17 | Sweden; W 27–25 | 2 | Spain; W 27–26^{ET} | Netherlands; W 24–23 | Russia; L 19–22 | 2nd place, silver medalist(s) |

=== Men's tournament ===
The French men's handball team qualified for the Olympics by winning the 2015 World Championships.

Team roster

The following is the French roster in the men's handball tournament of the 2016 Summer Olympics.

Head coach: Claude Onesta

| No. | Pos. | Name | Date of birth (age) | Height | App. | Goals | Club |
|---|---|---|---|---|---|---|---|
| 8 | LB | Daniel Narcisse | 16 December 1979 (aged 37) | 1.89 m | 280 | 858 | (France) Paris Saint-Germain |
| 12 | GK | Vincent Gérard | 16 December 1986 (aged 30) | 1.88 m | 25 | 0 | (France) Montpellier Handball |
| 13 | CB | Nikola Karabatić | 11 April 1984 (aged 33) | 1.96 m | 252 | 1024 | (France) Paris Saint-Germain |
| 14 | CB | Kentin Mahé | 22 May 1991 (aged 26) | 1.86 m | 42 | 98 | (Germany) Flensburg-Handewitt |
| 15 | LB | Mathieu Grébille | 6 October 1991 (aged 25) | 1.98 m | 39 | 57 | (France) Montpellier Handball |
| 16 | GK | Thierry Omeyer | 2 November 1976 (aged 40) | 1.92 m | 328 | 1 | (France) Paris Saint-Germain |
| 17 | LB | Timothey N'Guessan | 18 September 1992 (aged 24) | 1.96 m | 20 | 35 | (France) Chambéry Savoie |
| 19 | RW | Luc Abalo | 6 September 1984 (aged 32) | 1.82 m | 196 | 646 | (France) Paris Saint-Germain |
| 20 | P | Cédric Sorhaindo | 7 June 1984 (aged 33) | 1.92 m | 150 | 302 | (Spain) Barcelona |
| 21 | LW | Michaël Guigou | 28 January 1982 (aged 35) | 1.79 m | 218 | 771 | (France) Montpellier Handball |
| 22 | P | Luka Karabatić | 19 April 1988 (aged 29) | 2.02 m | 42 | 46 | (France) Paris Saint-Germain |
| 23 | P | Ludovic Fabregas | 1 July 1996 (aged 21) | 1.98 m | 7 | 5 | (France) Montpellier Handball |
| 27 | RB | Adrien Dipanda | 3 May 1988 (aged 29) | 2.02 m | 7 | 10 | (France) Saint-Raphaël |
| 28 | RB | Valentin Porte | 7 September 1990 (aged 26) | 1.90 m | 48 | 114 | (France) Fenix Toulouse |

Group play

| Pos | Team | Pld | W | D | L | GF | GA | GD | Pts | Qualification |
|---|---|---|---|---|---|---|---|---|---|---|
| 1 | Croatia | 5 | 4 | 0 | 1 | 147 | 134 | +13 | 8 (Note: Croatia 29–28 France) | Quarter-finals |
| 2 | France | 5 | 4 | 0 | 1 | 152 | 126 | +26 | 8 | Quarter-finals |
| 3 | Denmark | 5 | 3 | 0 | 2 | 136 | 127 | +9 | 6 | Quarter-finals |
| 4 | Qatar | 5 | 2 | 1 | 2 | 122 | 127 | −5 | 5 | Quarter-finals |
| 5 | Argentina | 5 | 1 | 0 | 4 | 110 | 126 | −16 | 2 | |
| 6 | Tunisia | 5 | 0 | 1 | 4 | 118 | 145 | −27 | 1 | |

Source: IHF
Rules for classification: 1) Points; 2) Head-to-head points; 3) Head-to-head goal difference; 4) Head-to-head goals scored; 5) Goal difference; 6) Goals scored; 7) Draw.
Notes:

| 7 August 2016; 19:50 | France | 25–23 | Tunisia | Future Arena, Rio de Janeiro; Referees: Geipel, Helbig (GER) |
| 7 August 2016; 19:50 | Mahé 5 | (16–11) | Tej 6 | Future Arena, Rio de Janeiro; Referees: Geipel, Helbig (GER) |
| 7 August 2016; 19:50 | 3× (yellow card) 1× (suspension) | Report | 4× (yellow card) 6× (suspension) | Future Arena, Rio de Janeiro; Referees: Geipel, Helbig (GER) |

| 9 August 2016; 09:30 | Qatar | 20–35 | France | Future Arena, Rio de Janeiro; Referees: Horáček, Novotný (CZE) |
| 9 August 2016; 09:30 | three players 4 | (13–16) | Abalo 7 | Future Arena, Rio de Janeiro; Referees: Horáček, Novotný (CZE) |
| 9 August 2016; 09:30 | 2× (yellow card) 4× (suspension) | Report | 3× (yellow card) 3× (suspension) | Future Arena, Rio de Janeiro; Referees: Horáček, Novotný (CZE) |

| 11 August 2016; 21:50 | France | 31–24 | Argentina | Future Arena, Rio de Janeiro; Referees: Nikolov, Nachevski (MKD) |
| 11 August 2016; 21:50 | Abalo 7 | (17–12) | F. Fernández 8 | Future Arena, Rio de Janeiro; Referees: Nikolov, Nachevski (MKD) |
| 11 August 2016; 21:50 | 3× (yellow card) 4× (suspension) 1× (red card) | Report | 3× (yellow card) 5× (suspension) | Future Arena, Rio de Janeiro; Referees: Nikolov, Nachevski (MKD) |

| 13 August 2016; 11:30 | Croatia | 29–28 | France | Future Arena, Rio de Janeiro; Referees: Pálsson, Elíasson (ISL) |
| 13 August 2016; 11:30 | Kopljar 6 | (14–12) | Guigou 10 | Future Arena, Rio de Janeiro; Referees: Pálsson, Elíasson (ISL) |
| 13 August 2016; 11:30 | 4× (yellow card) 5× (suspension) 2× (red card) | Report | 4× (yellow card) 2× (suspension) | Future Arena, Rio de Janeiro; Referees: Pálsson, Elíasson (ISL) |

| 15 August 2016; 14:40 | France | 33–30 | Denmark | Future Arena, Rio de Janeiro; Referees: Lah, Sok (SLO) |
| 15 August 2016; 14:40 | Mahé 9 | (17–16) | Hansen 8 | Future Arena, Rio de Janeiro; Referees: Lah, Sok (SLO) |
| 15 August 2016; 14:40 | 2× (yellow card) 3× (suspension) | Report | 3× (yellow card) 5× (suspension) | Future Arena, Rio de Janeiro; Referees: Lah, Sok (SLO) |

Quarterfinal

| 17 August 2016; 10:00 | Brazil | 27–34 | France | Future Arena, Rio de Janeiro; Referees: Horáček, Novotný (CZE) |
| 17 August 2016; 10:00 | Pozzer 8 | (16–16) | Guigou 8 | Future Arena, Rio de Janeiro; Referees: Horáček, Novotný (CZE) |
| 17 August 2016; 10:00 | 3× (yellow card) 4× (suspension) | Report | 2× (yellow card) 3× (suspension) | Future Arena, Rio de Janeiro; Referees: Horáček, Novotný (CZE) |

Semifinal

| 19 August 2016; 15:30 | France | 29–28 | Germany | Future Arena, Rio de Janeiro; Referees: Hansen, Gjeding (DEN) |
| 19 August 2016; 15:30 | Narcisse 7 | (16–13) | Gensheimer 11 | Future Arena, Rio de Janeiro; Referees: Hansen, Gjeding (DEN) |
| 19 August 2016; 15:30 | 3× (yellow card) 4× (suspension) | Report | 3× (yellow card) 5× (suspension) | Future Arena, Rio de Janeiro; Referees: Hansen, Gjeding (DEN) |

Gold medal match

| 21 August 2016; 14:00 | Denmark | 28–26 | France | Future Arena, Rio de Janeiro; Referees: López, Ramírez (ESP) |
| 21 August 2016; 14:00 | M. Hansen 8 | (16–14) | Guigou 6 | Future Arena, Rio de Janeiro; Referees: López, Ramírez (ESP) |
| 21 August 2016; 14:00 | 2× (yellow card) 4× (suspension) | Report | 3× (yellow card) 2× (suspension) | Future Arena, Rio de Janeiro; Referees: López, Ramírez (ESP) |

=== Women's tournament ===
The French women's handball team qualified for the Olympics by virtue of a top two finish at the first meet of the Olympic Qualification Tournament in Metz.

Team roster

The following is the French roster in the women's handball tournament of the 2016 Summer Olympics.

Head coach: Olivier Krumbholz

| No. | Pos. | Name | Date of birth (age) | Height | App. | Goals | Club |
|---|---|---|---|---|---|---|---|
| 1 | GK | Laura Glauser | 20 August 1993 (aged 22) | 1.78 m | 38 | 0 | (France) Metz Handball |
| 3 | RW | Blandine Dancette | 14 February 1988 (aged 28) | 1.69 m | 80 | 103 | (France) Chambray Touraine |
| 5 | RB | Camille Ayglon | 21 May 1985 (aged 31) | 1.80 m | 207 | 378 | (Romania) CSM București |
| 7 | CB | Allison Pineau | 2 May 1989 (aged 27) | 1.81 m | 182 | 475 | (France) Brest Bretagne Handball |
| 8 | P | Laurisa Landre | 27 October 1985 (aged 30) | 1.74 m | 38 | 58 | (Romania) S.C.M. Craiova |
| 10 | CB | Grace Zaadi | 7 July 1993 (aged 23) | 1.71 m | 48 | 65 | (France) Metz Handball |
| 12 | GK | Amandine Leynaud | 2 May 1988 (aged 28) | 1.78 m | 177 | 1 | (North Macedonia) Vardar |
| 13 | LW | Manon Houette | 2 July 1992 (aged 24) | 1.68 m | 26 | 49 | (Germany) Thüringer HC |
| 17 | LW | Siraba Dembélé | 28 June 1986 (aged 30) | 1.72 m | 211 | 681 | (Russia) Rostov-Don |
| 18 | RW | Chloé Bulleux | 18 November 1991 (aged 24) | 1.72 m | 26 | 45 | (Hungary) Siófok |
| 24 | P | Béatrice Edwige | 3 October 1988 (aged 27) | 1.82 m | 28 | 13 | (France) Metz Handball |
| 27 | LB | Estelle Nze Minko | 11 August 1991 (aged 24) | 1.76 m | 38 | 61 | (Hungary) Siófok |
| 29 | LB | Gnonsiane Niombla | 9 July 1990 (aged 26) | 1.72 m | 47 | 138 | (Romania) CSM București |
| 64 | RB | Alexandra Lacrabère | 27 April 1987 (aged 29) | 1.72 m | 173 | 541 | (North Macedonia) Vardar |

Group play

| Pos | Team | Pld | W | D | L | GF | GA | GD | Pts | Qualification |
|---|---|---|---|---|---|---|---|---|---|---|
| 1 | Russia | 5 | 5 | 0 | 0 | 165 | 147 | +18 | 10 | Quarter-finals |
| 2 | France | 5 | 4 | 0 | 1 | 118 | 93 | +25 | 8 | Quarter-finals |
| 3 | Sweden | 5 | 2 | 1 | 2 | 150 | 141 | +9 | 5 | Quarter-finals |
| 4 | Netherlands | 5 | 1 | 2 | 2 | 135 | 135 | 0 | 4 | Quarter-finals |
| 5 | South Korea | 5 | 1 | 1 | 3 | 130 | 136 | −6 | 3 | |
| 6 | Argentina | 5 | 0 | 0 | 5 | 101 | 147 | −46 | 0 | |

Source: IHF
Rules for classification: 1) Points; 2) Head-to-head points; 3) Head-to-head goal difference; 4) Head-to-head goals scored; 5) Goal difference; 6) Goals scored; 7) Draw.

| 6 August 2016; 11:30 | Netherlands | 14–18 | France | Future Arena, Rio de Janeiro; Referees: Røen, Arntsen (NOR) |
| 6 August 2016; 11:30 | three players 3 | (6–10) | Lacrabère, Pineau 5 | Future Arena, Rio de Janeiro; Referees: Røen, Arntsen (NOR) |
| 6 August 2016; 11:30 | 3× (yellow card) 5× (suspension) | Report | 3× (yellow card) 3× (suspension) | Future Arena, Rio de Janeiro; Referees: Røen, Arntsen (NOR) |

| 8 August 2016; 11:30 | France | 25–26 | Russia | Future Arena, Rio de Janeiro; Referees: Lah, Sok (SLO) |
| 8 August 2016; 11:30 | Lacrabère 11 | (10–15) | Kuznetsova 6 | Future Arena, Rio de Janeiro; Referees: Lah, Sok (SLO) |
| 8 August 2016; 11:30 | 3× (yellow card) 6× (suspension) | Report | 4× (yellow card) 4× (suspension) | Future Arena, Rio de Janeiro; Referees: Lah, Sok (SLO) |

| 10 August 2016; 21:50 | France | 27–11 | Argentina | Future Arena, Rio de Janeiro; Referees: Alpaidze, Berezkina (RUS) |
| 10 August 2016; 21:50 | Houette 8 | (15–4) | Campigli 4 | Future Arena, Rio de Janeiro; Referees: Alpaidze, Berezkina (RUS) |
| 10 August 2016; 21:50 | 3× (yellow card) 4× (suspension) | Report | 2× (yellow card) 7× (suspension) | Future Arena, Rio de Janeiro; Referees: Alpaidze, Berezkina (RUS) |

| 12 August 2016; 21:50 | South Korea | 17–21 | France | Future Arena, Rio de Janeiro; Referees: Hansen, Gjeding (DEN) |
| 12 August 2016; 21:50 | Song 5 | (11–11) | Lacrabère 7 | Future Arena, Rio de Janeiro; Referees: Hansen, Gjeding (DEN) |
| 12 August 2016; 21:50 | 1× (yellow card) 3× (suspension) | Report | 4× (yellow card) 6× (suspension) | Future Arena, Rio de Janeiro; Referees: Hansen, Gjeding (DEN) |

| 14 August 2016; 11:30 | Sweden | 25–27 | France | Future Arena, Rio de Janeiro; Referees: Røen, Arntsen (NOR) |
| 14 August 2016; 11:30 | Roberts 8 | (13–15) | Lacrabère 8 | Future Arena, Rio de Janeiro; Referees: Røen, Arntsen (NOR) |
| 14 August 2016; 11:30 | 2× (yellow card) 2× (suspension) | Report | 4× (yellow card) 1× (suspension) | Future Arena, Rio de Janeiro; Referees: Røen, Arntsen (NOR) |

Quarterfinal

16 August 2016
13:30
Spain
26–27 (ET)
France
Future Arena, Rio de Janeiro
Referees: Alpaidze, Berezkina (RUS)
Pena 13
(12–5)
Lacrabère 7
4× (yellow card) 8× (suspension) 1× (red card)
Report
2× (yellow card) 2× (suspension)

FT: 23–23 ET: 3–4

Semifinal

| 18 August 2016; 15:30 | Netherlands | 23–24 | France | Future Arena, Rio de Janeiro; Referees: Koo, Lee (KOR) |
| 18 August 2016; 15:30 | van der Heijden 8 | (13–17) | Pineau 7 | Future Arena, Rio de Janeiro; Referees: Koo, Lee (KOR) |
| 18 August 2016; 15:30 | 3× (yellow card) 2× (suspension) | Report | 2× (yellow card) 3× (suspension) | Future Arena, Rio de Janeiro; Referees: Koo, Lee (KOR) |

Gold medal match

| 20 August 2016; 15:30 | France | 19–22 | Russia | Future Arena, Rio de Janeiro; Referees: Røen, Arntsen (NOR) |
| 20 August 2016; 15:30 | Dembélé, Pineau 5 | (7–10) | Vyakhireva 5 | Future Arena, Rio de Janeiro; Referees: Røen, Arntsen (NOR) |
| 20 August 2016; 15:30 | 2× (yellow card) 1× (suspension) | Report | 3× (yellow card) 2× (suspension) | Future Arena, Rio de Janeiro; Referees: Røen, Arntsen (NOR) |

== Judo ==
France has qualified a full squad of 14 judokas (seven men and seven women) for each of the following weight classes at the Games by virtue of their top 22 national finish for men and top 14 for women in the IJF World Ranking List of 30 May 2016. The judo team was named to the Olympic roster on 1 June 2016, including defending Olympic heavyweight champion Teddy Riner, and London 2012 bronze medalists Priscilla Gneto, Automne Pavia, Gévrise Émane, and Audrey Tcheuméo.

Men

| Athlete | Event | Round of 64 | Round of 32 | Round of 16 | Quarterfinals | Semifinals | Repechage | Final / BM | |
| Athlete | Event | Opposition Result | Opposition Result | Opposition Result | Opposition Result | Opposition Result | Opposition Result | Opposition Result | Rank |
|---|---|---|---|---|---|---|---|---|---|
| Walide Khyar | −60 kg | Yacoub (PLE); W 100–000 | Kitadai (BRA); L 000–001 | did not advance | | | | | |
| Kilian Le Blouch | −66 kg | Bye | Oates (GBR); W 000–000 YUS | An B-u (KOR); L 000–110 | did not advance | | | | |
| Pierre Duprat | −73 kg | Hong K-h (PRK); W 100–000 | Iartcev (RUS); L 000–000 YUS | did not advance | | | | | |
| Loïc Pietri | −81 kg | Bye | Valois-Fortier (CAN); L 000–001 | did not advance | | | | | |
| Alexandre Iddir | −90 kg | Bye | Grossklaus (SUI); W 000–000 S | Brown (USA); W 010–000 | Baker (JPN); L 000–100 | Did not advance | Nyman (SWE); L 000–100 | Did not advance | 7 |
| Cyrille Maret | −100 kg | Bye | Traoré (MLI); W 100–000 | Grol (NED); W 001–000 | Gviniashvili (GEO); W 010–000 | Krpálek (CZE); L 000–100 | Bye | Frey (GER); W 100–000 | 3rd place, bronze medalist(s) |
| Teddy Riner | +100 kg | —N/a | Bye | Tayeb (ALG); W 100–000 | R Silva (BRA); W 010–000 | Sasson (ISR); W 010–000 | Bye | Harasawa (JPN); W 000–000 S | 1st place, gold medalist(s) |

Women

| Athlete | Event | Round of 32 | Round of 16 | Quarterfinals | Semifinals | Repechage | Final / BM | |
| Athlete | Event | Opposition Result | Opposition Result | Opposition Result | Opposition Result | Opposition Result | Opposition Result | Rank |
|---|---|---|---|---|---|---|---|---|
| Laëtitia Payet | −48 kg | Rayner (AUS); W 101–000 | Mönkhbat (MGL); L 000–100 | did not advance | | | | |
| Priscilla Gneto | −52 kg | Tschopp (SUI); L 000–100 | did not advance | | | | | |
| Automne Pavia | −57 kg | Bye | Smythe-Davis (GBR); W 100–000 | Matsumoto (JPN); L 000–010 | Did not advance | Monteiro (POR); L 000–100 | Did not advance | 7 |
| Clarisse Agbegnenou | −63 kg | Bye | Katipoğlu (TUR); W 102–000 | van Emden (NED); W 101–000 | Tashiro (JPN); W 000–000 S | Bye | Trstenjak (SLO); L 000–101 | 2nd place, silver medalist(s) |
| Gévrise Émane | −70 kg | Bye | Conway (GBR); L 001–100 | did not advance | | | | |
| Audrey Tcheuméo | −78 kg | Bye | Kyong (PRK); W 100–000 | Powell (GBR); W 000–000 S | Aguiar (BRA); W 000–000 S | Bye | Harrison (USA); L 000–100 | 2nd place, silver medalist(s) |
| Émilie Andéol | +78 kg | Bye | Zambotti (MEX); W 000–000 S | Chikhrouhou (TUN); W 000–000 S | Yu S (CHN); W 100–000 | Bye | Ortíz (CUB); W 100–000 | 1st place, gold medalist(s) |

== Modern pentathlon ==
French athletes have qualified for the following spots to compete in modern pentathlon. Valentin Prades, Valentin Belaud, and Élodie Clouvel secured a selection each in the men's and women's event through the 2015 European Championships.

| Athlete | Event | Fencing (épée one touch) | | | | Swimming (200 m freestyle) | | | Riding (show jumping) | | | Combined: shooting/running (10 m air pistol)/(3200 m) | | | Total points | Final rank |
| Athlete | Event | RR | BR | Rank | MP points | Time | Rank | MP points | Penalties | Rank | MP points | Time | Rank | MP Points | Total points | Final rank |
|---|---|---|---|---|---|---|---|---|---|---|---|---|---|---|---|---|
| Valentin Belaud | Men's | 19–16 | 2 | 13 | 214 | 2:04.44 | 32 | 317 | 14 | 13 | 286 | 11:39.37 | 22 | 601 | 1420 | 20 |
| Valentin Prades | Men's | 21–14 | 1 | 4 | 227 | 2:07.83 | 18 | 327 | 23 | 23 | 277 | 11:04.08 | 3 | 636 | 1467 | 4 |
| Élodie Clouvel | Women's | 21–14 | 1 | 7 | 227 | 2:08.62 | 2 | 315 | 7 | 11 | 293 | 12:59.06 | 17 | 521 | 1356 | 2nd place, silver medalist(s) |

== Rowing ==
France has qualified a total of seven boats for each of the following rowing classes into the Olympic regatta. Six rowing crews had confirmed Olympic places for their boats at the 2015 FISA World Championships in Lac d'Aiguebelette, France, while the men's four rowers were further added to the French roster with their top two finish at the 2016 European & Final Qualification Regatta in Lucerne, Switzerland.

On 28 June 2016, a total of 18 rowers (14 men and 4 women) were selected to the French team for the Games, including London 2012 silver medalists Germain Chardin and Dorian Mortelette in the men's coxless pair.

Men

| Athlete | Event | Heats | | Repechage | | Semifinals | | Final | |
| Athlete | Event | Time | Rank | Time | Rank | Time | Rank | Time | Rank |
|---|---|---|---|---|---|---|---|---|---|
| Germain Chardin; Dorian Mortelette | Pair | 6:42.00 | 1 SA/B | Bye | | 6:26.10 | 3 FA | 7:09.91 | 5 |
| Matthieu Androdias; Hugo Boucheron | Double sculls | 6:33.03 | 2 SA/B | Bye | | 6:16.15 | 3 FA | 7:02.06 | 6 |
| Jérémie Azou; Pierre Houin | Lightweight double sculls | 6:24.62 | 1 SA/B | Bye | | 6:34.43 | 1 FA | 6:30.70 | 1st place, gold medalist(s) |
| Benjamin Lang; Mickaël Marteau; Théophile Onfroy; Valentin Onfroy | Four | 6:00.72 | 3 SA/B | Bye | | 6:26.94 | 5 FB | 6:02.21 | 11 |
| Thomas Baroukh; Thibault Colard; Guillaume Raineau; Franck Solforosi | Lightweight four | 6:07.31 | 4 R | 6:01.18 | 1 SA/B | 6:07.32 | 2 FA | 6:22.85 | 3rd place, bronze medalist(s) |

Women

| Athlete | Event | Heats | | Repechage | | Semifinals | | Final | |
| Athlete | Event | Time | Rank | Time | Rank | Time | Rank | Time | Rank |
|---|---|---|---|---|---|---|---|---|---|
| Noémie Kober; Marie Le Nepvou | Pair | 7:26.28 | 4 R | 7:59.44 | 3 SA/B | 7:44.81 | 6 FB | 7:26.55 | 12 |
| Hélène Lefebvre; Elodie Ravera | Double sculls | 7:05.65 | 3 SA/B | Bye | | 6:54.34 | 3 FA | 7:52.03 | 5 |

Qualification Legend: FA=Final A (medal); FB=Final B (non-medal); FC=Final C (non-medal); FD=Final D (non-medal); FE=Final E (non-medal); FF=Final F (non-medal); SA/B=Semifinals A/B; SC/D=Semifinals C/D; SE/F=Semifinals E/F; QF=Quarterfinals; R=Repechage

== Rugby sevens ==
=== Men's tournament ===
France's men's rugby sevens team qualified for the Olympics by winning the 2015 Rugby Europe Sevens Championships.

Team roster

The following is the France roster in the men's rugby sevens tournament of the 2016 Summer Olympics.

Head coach: Frédéric Pomarel

| No. | Pos. | Player | Date of birth (age) | Events | Points | Union |
|---|---|---|---|---|---|---|
| 1 | FW | Jonathan Laugel | 30 January 1993 (aged 23) | 40 | 95 | Unattached |
| 2 | FW | Manoël Dall'igna | 12 March 1985 (aged 31) | 50 | 255 | Unattached |
| 3 | FW | Damien Cler | 2 October 1983 (aged 32) | 10 | 65 | Unattached |
| 4 | BK | Terry Bouhraoua (c) | 26 August 1987 (aged 28) | 37 | 915 | Unattached |
| 5 | BK | Stephen Parez | 1 August 1994 (aged 22) | 24 | 273 | Unattached |
| 6 | BK | Steeve Barry | 18 April 1991 (aged 25) | 39 | 274 | (France) Stade Rochelais |
| 7 | BK | Virimi Vakatawa | 1 May 1992 (aged 24) | 16 | 300 | Unattached |
| 8 | FW | Pierre-Gilles Lakafia | 12 March 1987 (aged 29) | 21 | 115 | Unattached |
| 9 | BK | Jérémy Aicardi | 26 November 1988 (aged 27) | 16 | 114 | Unattached |
| 10 | BK | Julien Candelon | 8 July 1980 (aged 36) | 35 | 546 | Unattached |
| 11 | FW | Sacha Valleau | 8 October 1996 (aged 19) | 10 | 42 | Unattached |
| 12 | BK | Vincent Inigo | 10 February 1983 (aged 33) | 29 | 109 | Unattached |

Group play

| Pos | Team | Pld | W | D | L | PF | PA | PD | Pts | Qualification |
|---|---|---|---|---|---|---|---|---|---|---|
| 1 | South Africa | 3 | 2 | 0 | 1 | 55 | 12 | +43 | 7 | Quarter-finals |
| 2 | France | 3 | 2 | 0 | 1 | 57 | 45 | +12 | 7 | Quarter-finals |
| 3 | Australia | 3 | 2 | 0 | 1 | 52 | 48 | +4 | 7 | Quarter-finals |
| 4 | Spain | 3 | 0 | 0 | 3 | 17 | 76 | −59 | 3 | |

Source: World Rugby
Rules for classification: 1) Points; 2) Head-to-head result; 3) Point difference; 4) Points scored.

9 August 2016
11:00

| Australia | 14–31 | France |
| Try: Parahi 8' c Jenkins 9' c Con: Stannard (2/2) | Report (Rio 2016); Report (World Rugby) | Try: Bouhraoua (3) 4' c, 6' c, 14' c Dall'igna 13' c Con: Bouhraoua (3/3); Inigo (1/1); Pen: Bouhraoua (1/1) 7' |

Deodoro Stadium, Rio de Janeiro
Referee: Mike Adamson (Great Britain)

9 August 2016
16:30

| South Africa | 26–0 | France |
| Try: Geduld 1' c Smith 4' c Brown 6' m Sage 12' c Con: Afrika (3/4) | Report (Rio 2016); Report (World Rugby) |

Deodoro Stadium, Rio de Janeiro
Referee: Richard Kelly (New Zealand)

10 August 2016
11:00

| France | 26–5 | Spain |
| Try: Vakatawa (2) 4' c, 8' m Cler 10' c Aicardi 12' c Con: Bouhraoua (3/4) | Report (Rio 2016); Report (World Rugby) | Try: Sempere 14' m Con: Genua (0/1) |

Deodoro Stadium, Rio de Janeiro
Referee: Anthony Moyes (Australia)

Quarterfinal

10 August 2016
17:30

| Japan | 12–7 | France |
| Try: Tuqiri 8' m Goto 7' c Con: Sakai (1/2) | Report (Rio 2016); Report (World Rugby) | Try: Cler 4' c Con: Bouhraoua (1/1) |

Deodoro Stadium, Rio de Janeiro
Referee: Richard Kelly (New Zealand)

Classification semifinal (5–8)

11 August 2016
13:30

| New Zealand | 24–19 | France |
| Try: Ware (2) 2' m, 12' c A. Ioane 8' m R. Ioane 10' c Con: Kaka (2/4) | Report (Rio 2016); Report (World Rugby) | Try: Parez (2) 4' c, 7' m Valleau 14' c Con: Bouhraoua (2/3) |

Deodoro Stadium, Rio de Janeiro
Referee: Federico Anselmi (Argentina)

Seventh place match

11 August 2016
17:30

| France | 12–10 | Australia |
| Try: Bouhraoua 6' m Candelon 8' c Con: Bouhraoua (1/2) | Report (Rio 2016); Report (World Rugby) | Try: Hutchison 1' m Jenkins 13' m Con: Stannard (0/2) |

Deodoro Stadium, Rio de Janeiro
Referee: Nick Briant (New Zealand)

=== Women's tournament ===
France's women's rugby sevens team qualified for the Olympics by winning the 2015 Rugby Europe Sevens Championships.

Team roster

The following is the France roster in the women's rugby sevens tournament of the 2016 Summer Olympics.

Head coach: David Courteix

| Backs | | Forwards |
|---|---|---|---|
| 4 | Pauline Biscarat | 1 | Rose Thomas |
| 5 | Jade Le Pesq | 2 | Audrey Amiel |
| 6 | Fanny Horta (c) | 3 | Marjorie Mayans |
| 7 | Caroline Ladagnous | 9 | Jennifer Troncy |
| 8 | Camille Grassineau | 10 | Elodie Guiglion |
| 12 | Lina Guérin | 11 | Shannon Izar |
| 14 | Jessy Tremouliere |

- Jessy Tremouliere was a late addition before the Olympics, replacing Christelle Le Duff who replaced Shannon Izar.

Group play

| Pos | Team | Pld | W | D | L | PF | PA | PD | Pts | Qualification |
|---|---|---|---|---|---|---|---|---|---|---|
| 1 | New Zealand | 3 | 3 | 0 | 0 | 109 | 12 | +97 | 9 | Quarter-finals |
| 2 | France | 3 | 2 | 0 | 1 | 71 | 40 | +31 | 7 | Quarter-finals |
| 3 | Spain | 3 | 1 | 0 | 2 | 31 | 65 | −34 | 5 | Quarter-finals |
| 4 | Kenya | 3 | 0 | 0 | 3 | 17 | 111 | −94 | 3 | |

Source: World Rugby
Rules for classification: 1) Points; 2) Head-to-head result; 3) Point difference; 4) Points scored.

6 August 2016
11:00

| France | 24–7 | Spain |
| Try: Grassineau 3' c Guérin 7' m Ladagnous 9' c Guiglion 13' m Con: Biscarat (2/4) | Report (Rio 2016); Report (World Rugby) | Try: P. García 11' c Con: P. García (1/1) |

Deodoro Stadium, Rio de Janeiro
Referee: Amy Perrett (Australia)

6 August 2016
16:00

| France | 40–7 | Kenya |
| Try: Ladagnous (2) 4' c, 14' m Le Pesq 7' c Horta 8' c Guérin 11' c Amiel 14' c Con: Le Pesq (4/5); Biscarat (1/1) | Report (Rio 2016); Report (World Rugby) | Try: Masinde 7' c Con: Awino (1/1) |

Deodoro Stadium, Rio de Janeiro
Referee: Alhambra Nievas (Spain)

7 August 2016
11:30

| New Zealand | 26–7 | France |
| Try: Brazier 1' c Manuel 3' c Woodman 6' m McAlister 13' c Con: Nathan-Wong (3/4) | Report (Rio 2016); Report (World Rugby) | Try: Grassineau 7' c Con: Biscarat (1/1) |

Deodoro Stadium, Rio de Janeiro
Referee: Rasta Rasivhenge (South Africa)

Quarterfinal

7 August 2016
17:30

| Canada | 15–5 | France |
| Try: Moleschi 6' m Farella 12' m Landry 14' m Con: Landry (0/2); Russell (0/1) | Report (Rio 2016); Report (World Rugby) | Try: Le Pesq 3' m Con: Le Pesq (0/1) |

Deodoro Stadium, Rio de Janeiro
Referee: Amy Perrett (Australia)

Classification semifinal (5–8)

8 August 2016
13:30

| Spain | 12–24 | France |
| Try: Erbina 12' c Etxebarría 14' m Con: P. García (1/2) | Report (Rio 2016); Report (World Rugby) | Try: Mayans 1' m Guérin (3) 3' c, 7' m, 9' c Con: Le Pesq (1/3); Biscarat (1/1) |

Deodoro Stadium, Rio de Janeiro
Referee: James Bolabiu (Fiji)

Fifth place match

8 August 2016
18:00

| France | 5–19 | United States |
| Try: Grassineau 6' m Con: Le Pesq (0/1) | Report (Rio 2016); Report (World Rugby) | Try: Kelter 8' c Javelet 9' m Fa'avesi 11' c Con: Kelter (1/2); Stephens (1/1) |

Deodoro Stadium, Rio de Janeiro
Referee: Sara Cox (Great Britain)

== Sailing ==
France has qualified one boat for each of the following classes at the 2014 ISAF Sailing World Championships, bringing the maximum quota of 15 sailors, in ten boats.

On 2 December 2015, the French Sailing Federation had selected the first five sailors to compete at the Rio regatta, including Olympic silver medalist Jonathan Lobert in the Finn class. The rest of the French sailing fleet were named to the Olympic team through a series of selection meets in February 2016; among them featured two-time Olympic Laser sailor Jean-Baptiste Bernaz, and four-time World mixed multihull champions Billy Besson and Marie Riou.

Men

| Athlete | Event | Race | | | | | | | | | | | | | Net points | Final rank |
| Athlete | Event | 1 | 2 | 3 | 4 | 5 | 6 | 7 | 8 | 9 | 10 | 11 | 12 | M* | Net points | Final rank |
|---|---|---|---|---|---|---|---|---|---|---|---|---|---|---|---|---|
| Pierre Le Coq | RS:X | 7 | 7 | 12 | 6 | 3 | 2 | 8 | 10 | ~~17~~ | 2 | 3 | 12 | 14 | 86 | 3rd place, bronze medalist(s) |
| Jean-Baptiste Bernaz | Laser | 11 | 10 | 4 | 17 | 5 | ~~47~~ | 3 | 15 | 19 | 2 | —N/a | | 2 | 90 | 5 |
| Jonathan Lobert | Finn | 10 | ~~15~~ | 1 | 7 | 12 | 14 | 11 | 12 | 14 | 14 | —N/a | | EL | 95 | 14 |
| Sofian Bouvet; Jérémie Mion | 470 | 6 | 6 | 10 | 2 | 6 | 6 | 14 | 9 | 20 | ~~22~~ | —N/a | | 8 | 87 | 7 |
| Noé Delpech; Julien d'Ortoli | 49er | ~~20~~ | 12 | 16 | 12 | 2 | 9 | 1 | 1 | 3 | 17 | 9 | 14 | 4 | 100 | 5 |

Women

| Athlete | Event | Race | | | | | | | | | | | | | Net points | Final rank |
| Athlete | Event | 1 | 2 | 3 | 4 | 5 | 6 | 7 | 8 | 9 | 10 | 11 | 12 | M* | Net points | Final rank |
|---|---|---|---|---|---|---|---|---|---|---|---|---|---|---|---|---|
| Charline Picon | RS:X | 1 | 2 | 1 | 4 | 5 | 10 | 5 | 11 | 8 | ~~27~~ | 3 | 10 | 4 | 64 | 1st place, gold medalist(s) |
| Mathilde de Kerangat | Laser Radial | 23 | 15 | ~~25~~ | 14 | 17 | 18 | 14 | 9 | 14 | 22 | —N/a | | EL | 146 | 21 |
| Hélène Defrance; Camille Lecointre | 470 | 6 | ~~18~~ | 2 | 3 | 4 | 13 | 7 | 7 | 6 | 2 | —N/a | | 12 | 62 | 3rd place, bronze medalist(s) |
| Aude Compan; Sarah Steyaert | 49erFX | 1 | 9 | 10 | 12 | 12 | 13 | 1 | 9 | 4 | ~~15~~ | 1 | 3 | 10 | 85 | 6 |

Mixed

| Athlete | Event | Race | | | | | | | | | | | | | Net points | Final rank |
| Athlete | Event | 1 | 2 | 3 | 4 | 5 | 6 | 7 | 8 | 9 | 10 | 11 | 12 | M* | Net points | Final rank |
|---|---|---|---|---|---|---|---|---|---|---|---|---|---|---|---|---|
| Billy Besson; Marie Riou | Nacra 17 | 7 | ~~17~~ | 15 | 8 | 13 | 15 | 2 | 1 | 1 | 3 | 11 | 7 | 10 | 93 | 6 |

M = Medal race; EL = Eliminated – did not advance into the medal race

== Shooting ==
French shooters have achieved quota places for the following events by virtue of their best finishes at the 2014 ISSF World Shooting Championships, the 2015 ISSF World Cup series, and European Championships or Games, as long as they obtained a minimum qualifying score (MQS) by 31 March 2016.

The entire shooting squad, led by Olympic bronze medalists Anthony Terras (2008) and Céline Goberville (2012), was announced as part of the initial batch to the Olympic team selection on 25 April 2016.

Men

| Athlete | Event | Qualification | | Semifinal | | Final | |
| Athlete | Event | Points | Rank | Points | Rank | Points | Rank |
|---|---|---|---|---|---|---|---|
| Éric Delaunay | Skeet | 121 (+11) | 7 | did not advance | | | |
| Cyril Graff | 50 m rifle prone | 624.3 | 9 | —N/a | | did not advance | |
| Jérémy Monnier | 10 m air rifle | 618.5 | 38 | —N/a | | did not advance | |
| Jérémy Monnier | 50 m rifle prone | 618.6 | 39 | —N/a | | did not advance | |
| Jean Quiquampoix | 25 m rapid fire pistol | 586 | 3 Q | —N/a | | 30 | 2nd place, silver medalist(s) |
| Alexis Raynaud | 50 m rifle 3 positions | 1176 | 5 Q | —N/a | | 448.4 | 3rd place, bronze medalist(s) |
| Valérian Sauveplane | 10 m air rifle | 621.1 | 26 | —N/a | | did not advance | |
| Valérian Sauveplane | 50 m rifle 3 positions | 1168 | 24 | —N/a | | did not advance | |
| Anthony Terras | Skeet | 121 (+3) | 8 | did not advance | | | |

Women

| Athlete | Event | Qualification | | Semifinal | | Final | |
| Athlete | Event | Points | Rank | Points | Rank | Points | Rank |
|---|---|---|---|---|---|---|---|
| Laurence Brize | 50 m rifle 3 positions | 577 | 20 | —N/a | | did not advance | |
| Céline Goberville | 10 m air pistol | 383 | 10 | —N/a | | did not advance | |
| Mathilde Lamolle | 25 m pistol | 550 | 39 | did not advance | | | |
| Stéphanie Tirode | 10 m air pistol | 381 | 13 | —N/a | | did not advance | |
| Stéphanie Tirode | 25 m pistol | 573 | 26 | did not advance | | | |

Qualification Legend: Q = Qualify for the next round; q = Qualify for the bronze medal (shotgun)

== Swimming ==
French swimmers have so far achieved qualifying standards in the following events (up to a maximum of 2 swimmers in each event at the Olympic Qualifying Time (OQT), and potentially 1 at the Olympic Selection Time (OST)): Swimmers must attain the federation's entry standards in finals at the 2016 French Elite Championships in Montpellier (29 March to 3 April) to assure their selection to the Olympic team.

On 6 April 2016, the French Swimming Federation (FFN) had announced the entire roster of 30 swimmers (17 men and 13 women) to compete at the Games, featuring London 2012 Olympic champions Florent Manaudou and Yannick Agnel.

Men

| Athlete | Event | Heat | | Semifinal | | Final | |
| Athlete | Event | Time | Rank | Time | Rank | Time | Rank |
|---|---|---|---|---|---|---|---|
| Yannick Agnel | 200 m freestyle | 1:47.35 | 19 | did not advance | | | |
| Frédérick Bousquet | 50 m freestyle | 22.27 | 25 | did not advance | | | |
| Jordan Coelho | 200 m butterfly | 1:58.62 | 25 | did not advance | | | |
| Nicolas D'Oriano | 1500 m freestyle | 15:33.62 | 40 | —N/a | | did not advance | |
| Damien Joly | 1500 m freestyle | 14:48.90 | 6 Q | —N/a | | 14:52.73 | 7 |
| Camille Lacourt | 100 m backstroke | 52.96 | 1 Q | 52.72 | 4 Q | 52.70 | 5 |
| Florent Manaudou | 50 m freestyle | 21.72 | 4 Q | 21.32 | 1 Q | 21.41 | 2nd place, silver medalist(s) |
| Mehdy Metella | 100 m butterfly | 51.71 | 5 Q | 51.73 | 8 Q | 51.58 | 6 |
| Clément Mignon | 100 m freestyle | 48.57 | =14 Q | 48.57 | 14 | did not advance | |
| Marc-Antoine Olivier | 10 km open water | —N/a | | | | 1:53:02.0 | 3rd place, bronze medalist(s) |
| Jordan Pothain | 400 m freestyle | 3:45.43 | 8 Q | —N/a | | 3:49.07 | 8 |
| Jérémy Stravius | 100 m freestyle | 48.62 | 18 | did not advance | | | |
| Jérémy Stravius | 200 m freestyle | 1:46.67 | 11 Q | DNS | | did not advance | |
| Jérémy Stravius | 100 m butterfly | 52.10 | 17 | did not advance | | | |
| Fabien Gilot; Florent Manaudou; Mehdy Metella; William Meynard*; Clément Mignon*; Jérémy Stravius | 4 × 100 m freestyle relay | 3:13.27 | 4 Q | —N/a | | 3:10.53 | 2nd place, silver medalist(s) |
| Lorys Bourelly; Damien Joly; Grégory Mallet; Jordan Pothain | 4 × 200 m freestyle relay | 7:13.71 | 14 | —N/a | | did not advance | |
| Theo Bussiere; Camille Lacourt; Clément Mignon; Jérémy Stravius | 4 × 100 m medley relay | 3:34.47 | 10 | —N/a | | did not advance | |

Women

| Athlete | Event | Heat | | Semifinal | | Final | |
| Athlete | Event | Time | Rank | Time | Rank | Time | Rank |
|---|---|---|---|---|---|---|---|
| Coralie Balmy | 200 m freestyle | 1:58.83 | 23 | did not advance | | | |
| Coralie Balmy | 400 m freestyle | 4:03.40 | 4 Q | —N/a | | 4:06.98 | 8 |
| Charlotte Bonnet | 100 m freestyle | 53.93 | 10 Q | 54.54 | 15 | did not advance | |
| Charlotte Bonnet | 200 m freestyle | 1:56.26 | 4 Q | 1:56.38 | 7 Q | 1:56.29 | 8 |
| Béryl Gastaldello | 100 m freestyle | 54.80 | 22 | did not advance | | | |
| Béryl Gastaldello | 100 m butterfly | 58.93 | 24 | did not advance | | | |
| Lara Grangeon | 200 m butterfly | 2:09.69 | 18 | did not advance | | | |
| Lara Grangeon | 400 m individual medley | 4:43.98 | 22 | —N/a | | did not advance | |
| Mélanie Henique | 50 m freestyle | 25.36 | 31 | did not advance | | | |
| Fantine Lesaffre | 200 m individual medley | 2:15.71 | =30 | did not advance | | | |
| Fantine Lesaffre | 400 m individual medley | 4:44.47 | 23 | —N/a | | did not advance | |
| Aurélie Muller | 10 km open water | —N/a | | | | DSQ | |
| Anna Santamans | 50 m freestyle | 24.93 | 21 | did not advance | | | |
| Marie Wattel | 100 m butterfly | 58.90 | 23 | did not advance | | | |
| Charlotte Bonnet; Mathilde Cini; Béryl Gastaldello; Anna Santamans | 4 × 100 m freestyle relay | 3:36.85 NR | 8 Q | —N/a | | 3:37.45 | 7 |
| Coralie Balmy; Charlotte Bonnet; Margaux Fabre; Cloé Hache | 4 × 200 m freestyle relay | 7:55.55 | 10 | —N/a | | did not advance | |
| Charlotte Bonnet; Fanny Deberghes; Béryl Gastaldello; Marie Wattel | 4 × 100 m medley relay | DSQ | | —N/a | | did not advance | |

== Synchronized swimming ==
France has fielded a squad of two synchronized swimmers to compete only in the women's duet by virtue of their first-place finish at the FINA Olympic test event in Rio de Janeiro.

| Athlete | Event | Technical routine | | Free routine (preliminary) | | | Free routine (final) | | |
| Athlete | Event | Points | Rank | Points | Total (technical + free) | Rank | Points | Total (technical + free) | Rank |
|---|---|---|---|---|---|---|---|---|---|
| Laura Augé; Margaux Chrétien | Duet | 86.2824 | 9 | 86.8667 | 173.1491 | 8 Q | 87.9667 | 174.2491 | 8 |

== Table tennis ==
France has entered four athletes into the table tennis competition at the Games. Emmanuel Lebesson secured one of the remaining Olympic spots in the men's singles by winning the repechage group final at the European Qualification Tournament in Halmstad, Sweden.

Simon Gauzy and London 2012 Olympian Li Xue were automatically selected among the top 22 eligible players each in their respective singles events, while Carole Grundisch granted an invitation from ITTF to compete in the women's singles as one of the next seven highest-ranked eligible players, not yet qualified, on the Olympic Ranking List.

Tristan Flore was awarded the third spot to build the men's team for the Games by virtue of a top 10 national finish in the ITTF Olympic Rankings.

On 28 July 2016, Grundisch withdrew from the Games due to her elbow injury sustained in a cycling accident.

| Athlete | Event | Preliminary | Round 1 | Round 2 | Round 3 | Round of 16 | Quarterfinals | Semifinals | Final / BM | |
| Athlete | Event | Opposition Result | Opposition Result | Opposition Result | Opposition Result | Opposition Result | Opposition Result | Opposition Result | Opposition Result | Rank |
|---|---|---|---|---|---|---|---|---|---|---|
| Simon Gauzy | Men's singles | Bye | | | Kou L (UKR); L 1–4 | did not advance | | | | |
| Emmanuel Lebesson | Men's singles | Bye | | Crişan (ROU); L 3–4 | did not advance | | | | | |
| Tristan Flore; Simon Gauzy; Emmanuel Lebesson | Men's team | —N/a | | | | Great Britain; L 2–3 | did not advance | | | |
| Li Xue | Women's singles | Bye | | Diaz (PUR); W 4–0 | Li Jie (NED); W 4–3 | Han Y (GER); L 1–4 | did not advance | | | |

== Taekwondo ==
France entered four athletes into the taekwondo competition at the Olympics. M'Bar N'Diaye, Yasmina Aziez, Haby Niaré, and 2008 Olympic bronze medalist Gwladys Épangue qualified automatically for their respective weight classes by finishing in the top 6 WTF Olympic rankings.

| Athlete | Event | Round of 16 | Quarterfinals | Semifinals | Repechage | Final / BM | |
| Athlete | Event | Opposition Result | Opposition Result | Opposition Result | Opposition Result | Opposition Result | Rank |
|---|---|---|---|---|---|---|---|
| M'bar N'diaye | Men's +80 kg | Issoufou (NIG); L 0–6 | did not advance | | Siqueira (BRA); L 2–5 | Did not advance | 7 |
| Yasmina Aziez | Women's −49 kg | Pimentel (ARU); W 2–1 | Zaninović (CRO); W 4–3 | Kim S-h (KOR); L 0–1 SUD | Bye | Abakarova (AZE); L 2–7 | 5 |
| Haby Niaré | Women's −67 kg | Louissaint (HAI); W 5–4 | Gbagbi (CIV); W 5–4 | Tatar (TUR); W 3–0 SUD | Bye | Oh H-r (KOR); L 12–13 | 2nd place, silver medalist(s) |
| Gwladys Épangue | Women's +67 kg | Koné (CIV); W 3–1 | Zheng Sy (CHN); L 1–4 | Did not advance | Rawal (NEP); W 4–3 | Galloway (USA); L 1–2 | 5 |

== Tennis ==
France has entered nine tennis players (six men and three women) into the Olympic tournament. Richard Gasquet (world no. 10), Jo-Wilfried Tsonga (world no. 12), Gaël Monfils (world no. 15), and Gilles Simon (world no. 18) qualified directly for the men's singles as four of the top 56 eligible players in the ATP World Rankings, while Alizé Cornet (world no. 59), Caroline Garcia (world no. 38), and Kristina Mladenovic (world no. 32) did so for the women's singles based on their WTA World Rankings as of 6 June 2016.

Pierre-Hugues Herbert and Nicolas Mahut had their appeals approved by the International Tennis Federation to compete in the men's doubles based on their direct top-10 ATP ranking.

On 18 July 2016, Gasquet pulled out of the Games due to a back injury and was replaced by Benoît Paire (world no. 24), the next eligible player from France.

Men

| Athlete | Event | Round of 64 | Round of 32 | Round of 16 | Quarterfinals | Semifinals | Final / BM | |
| Athlete | Event | Opposition Score | Opposition Score | Opposition Score | Opposition Score | Opposition Score | Opposition Score | Rank |
|---|---|---|---|---|---|---|---|---|
| Gaël Monfils | Singles | Pospisil (CAN); W 6–1, 6–3 | Dutra Silva (BRA); W 6–2, 6–4 | Čilić (CRO); W 6–7^{(6–8)}, 6–3, 6–4 | Nishikori (JPN); L 6–7^{(4–7)}, 6–4, 6–7^{(6–8)} | did not advance | | |
| Benoît Paire | Singles | Rosol (CZE); W 3–6, 6–3, 6–4 | Fognini (ITA); L 6–4, 4–6, 6–7^{(5–7)} | did not advance | | | | |
| Gilles Simon | Singles | Ćorić (CRO); W 6–4, 7–6^{(7–1)} | Sugita (JPN); W 7–6^{(7–3)}, 6–2 | Nadal (ESP); L 6–7^{(5–7)}, 3–6 | did not advance | | | |
| Jo-Wilfried Tsonga | Singles | Jaziri (TUN); W 4–6, 7–5, 6–3 | Müller (LUX); L 4–6, 3–6 | did not advance | | | | |
| Gaël Monfils; Jo-Wilfried Tsonga | Doubles | —N/a | Baker / Ram (USA); L 1–6, 4–6 | did not advance | | | | |
| Pierre-Hugues Herbert; Nicolas Mahut | Doubles | —N/a | Cabal / Farah (COL); L 6–7^{(4–7)}, 3–6 | did not advance | | | | |

Women

| Athlete | Event | Round of 64 | Round of 32 | Round of 16 | Quarterfinals | Semifinals | Final / BM | |
| Athlete | Event | Opposition Score | Opposition Score | Opposition Score | Opposition Score | Opposition Score | Opposition Score | Rank |
|---|---|---|---|---|---|---|---|---|
| Alizé Cornet | Singles | Larsson (SWE); W 6–1, 2–6, 6–3 | S Williams (USA); L 6–7^{(5–7)}, 2–6 | did not advance | | | | |
| Caroline Garcia | Singles | Pereira (BRA); W 6–1, 6–2 | Konta (GBR); L 2–6, 3–6 | did not advance | | | | |
| Kristina Mladenovic | Singles | Krunić (SRB); W 6–1, 6–4 | Keys (USA); L 5–7, 7–6^{(7–4)}, 6–7^{(5–7)} | did not advance | | | | |
| Caroline Garcia; Kristina Mladenovic | Doubles | —N/a | Doi / Hozumi (JPN); L 0–6, 6–0, 4–6 | did not advance | | | | |

Mixed

| Athlete | Event | Round of 16 | Quarterfinals | Semifinals | Final / BM | |
| Athlete | Event | Opposition Score | Opposition Score | Opposition Score | Opposition Score | Rank |
|---|---|---|---|---|---|---|
| Caroline Garcia; Nicolas Mahut | Doubles | Pereira / Melo (BRA); L 6–7^{(4–7)}, 6–7^{(1–7)} | did not advance | | | |
| Kristina Mladenovic; Pierre-Hugues Herbert | Doubles | Vinci / Fognini (ITA); L 4–6, 6–3, [8–10] | did not advance | | | |

== Triathlon ==
France has qualified a total of five triathletes for the Olympics. London 2012 Olympian Vincent Luis secured the men's triathlon spot with a top three finish at the ITU World Qualification Event in Rio de Janeiro. Meanwhile, rookies Dorian Coninx and Pierre Le Corre, along with Cassandre Beaugrand, were ranked among the top 40 eligible triathletes each in the men's and women's event, respectively, based on the ITU Olympic Qualification List as of 15 May 2016. Audrey Merle rounded out the French triathlon roster as a replacement for Emmie Charayron, who announced her withdrawal from the Games for medical reasons on 5 July 2016.

| Athlete | Event | Swim (1.5 km) | Trans 1 | Bike (40 km) | Trans 2 | Run (10 km) | Total Time | Rank |
|---|---|---|---|---|---|---|---|---|
| Dorian Coninx | Men's | 17:28 | 0:52 | 56:22 | 0:36 | 36:32 | 1:51:50 | 36 |
| Pierre Le Corre | Men's | 17:28 | 0:48 | 57:02 | 0:35 | 32:43 | 1:48:36 | 25 |
| Vincent Luis | Men's | 17:26 | 0:48 | 55:04 | 0:33 | 32:21 | 1:46:12 | 7 |
| Cassandre Beaugrand | Women's | 19:16 | 0:52 | 1:04:35 | 0:46 | 36:49 | 2:02:18 | 30 |
| Audrey Merle | Women's | 19:19 | 0:53 | 1:04:31 | 0:39 | 37:31 | 2:02:53 | 35 |

== Volleyball ==
=== Indoor ===
==== Men's tournament ====
France men's volleyball team qualified for the Olympics by virtue of a top three national finish at the first meet of the World Olympic Qualifying Tournament in Tokyo, Japan, signifying the nation's Olympic comeback to the sport for the first time since 2004.

Team roster

The following is the France roster in the men's volleyball tournament of the 2016 Summer Olympics.

Head coach: Laurent Tillie

| No. | Name | Date of birth | Height | Weight | Spike | Block | 2015–16 club |
|---|---|---|---|---|---|---|---|
| 2 | Jenia Grebennikov (L) | 13 August 1990 | 1.88 m (6 ft 2 in) | 85 kg (187 lb) | 345 cm (136 in) | 330 cm (130 in) | (Italy) Cucine Lube Civitanova |
| 4 | Antonin Rouzier | 18 August 1986 | 2.00 m (6 ft 7 in) | 102 kg (225 lb) | 350 cm (140 in) | 330 cm (130 in) | (Turkey) Arkas İzmir |
| 5 | Trévor Clévenot | 28 June 1994 | 1.99 m (6 ft 6 in) | 89 kg (196 lb) | 335 cm (132 in) | 316 cm (124 in) | (France) Spacer's Toulouse |
| 6 | Benjamin Toniutti (c) | 30 October 1989 | 1.83 m (6 ft 0 in) | 73 kg (161 lb) | 320 cm (130 in) | 300 cm (120 in) | (Poland) ZAKSA Kędzierzyn-Koźle |
| 7 | Kévin Tillie | 2 November 1990 | 2.00 m (6 ft 7 in) | 85 kg (187 lb) | 345 cm (136 in) | 325 cm (128 in) | (Poland) ZAKSA Kędzierzyn-Koźle |
| 9 | Earvin N'Gapeth | 12 February 1991 | 1.94 m (6 ft 4 in) | 101 kg (223 lb) | 358 cm (141 in) | 327 cm (129 in) | (Italy) DHL Modena |
| 10 | Kévin Le Roux | 11 May 1989 | 2.09 m (6 ft 10 in) | 98 kg (216 lb) | 365 cm (144 in) | 345 cm (136 in) | (Turkey) Halkbank Ankara |
| 13 | Pierre Pujol | 13 July 1984 | 1.86 m (6 ft 1 in) | 90 kg (200 lb) | 335 cm (132 in) | 315 cm (124 in) | (France) AS Cannes |
| 14 | Nicolas Le Goff | 15 February 1992 | 2.06 m (6 ft 9 in) | 115 kg (254 lb) | 365 cm (144 in) | 328 cm (129 in) | (Germany) Berlin Recycling Volleys |
| 16 | Nicolas Maréchal | 4 March 1987 | 1.98 m (6 ft 6 in) | 93 kg (205 lb) | 338 cm (133 in) | 327 cm (129 in) | (Poland) PGE Skra Bełchatów |
| 17 | Franck Lafitte | 8 March 1989 | 2.03 m (6 ft 8 in) | 94 kg (207 lb) | 350 cm (140 in) | 330 cm (130 in) | (France) Arago de Sète |
| 18 | Thibault Rossard | 28 August 1993 | 1.93 m (6 ft 4 in) | 85 kg (187 lb) | 350 cm (140 in) | 320 cm (130 in) | (France) Arago de Sète |

Group play

| Pos | Team | Pld | W | L | Pts | SW | SL | SR | SPW | SPL | SPR | Qualification |
|---|---|---|---|---|---|---|---|---|---|---|---|---|
| 1 | Italy | 5 | 4 | 1 | 12 | 13 | 5 | 2.600 | 432 | 375 | 1.152 | Quarterfinals |
| 2 | Canada | 5 | 3 | 2 | 9 | 10 | 7 | 1.429 | 378 | 378 | 1.000 | Quarterfinals |
| 3 | United States | 5 | 3 | 2 | 9 | 10 | 8 | 1.250 | 419 | 405 | 1.035 | Quarterfinals |
| 4 | Brazil (H) | 5 | 3 | 2 | 9 | 11 | 9 | 1.222 | 467 | 442 | 1.057 | Quarterfinals |
| 5 | France | 5 | 2 | 3 | 6 | 8 | 9 | 0.889 | 386 | 367 | 1.052 | |
| 6 | Mexico | 5 | 0 | 5 | 0 | 1 | 15 | 0.067 | 283 | 398 | 0.711 | |

Source: FIVB
Rules for classification: Tiebreakers
(H) Host

| 7 August 2016; 09:30 | Italy | 3–0 | France | Ginásio do Maracanãzinho, Rio de Janeiro; Attendance: 4,456; Referees: Hernán Casamiquela (ARG), Denny Cespedes (DOM) |
| 7 August 2016; 09:30 | (25–20, 25–20, 25–15); Results Statistics | | | Ginásio do Maracanãzinho, Rio de Janeiro; Attendance: 4,456; Referees: Hernán Casamiquela (ARG), Denny Cespedes (DOM) |

| 9 August 2016; 11:55 | France | 3–0 | Mexico | Ginásio do Maracanãzinho, Rio de Janeiro; Attendance: 6,625; Referees: Liu Jiang (CHN), Taoufik Boudaya (TUN) |
| 9 August 2016; 11:55 | (25–18, 25–12, 25–22); Results Statistics | | | Ginásio do Maracanãzinho, Rio de Janeiro; Attendance: 6,625; Referees: Liu Jiang (CHN), Taoufik Boudaya (TUN) |

| 11 August 2016; 17:05 | Canada | 0–3 | France | Ginásio do Maracanãzinho, Rio de Janeiro; Attendance: 6,498; Referees: Andrey Zenovich (RUS), Nasr Shaaban (EGY) |
| 11 August 2016; 17:05 | (19–25, 16–25, 19–25); Results Statistics | | | Ginásio do Maracanãzinho, Rio de Janeiro; Attendance: 6,498; Referees: Andrey Zenovich (RUS), Nasr Shaaban (EGY) |

| 13 August 2016; 17:25 | United States | 3–1 | France | Ginásio do Maracanãzinho, Rio de Janeiro; Attendance: 7,877; Referees: Arturo Di Giacomo (BEL), Luis Macias (MEX) |
| 13 August 2016; 17:25 | (25–22, 25–22, 14–25, 25–22); Results Statistics | | | Ginásio do Maracanãzinho, Rio de Janeiro; Attendance: 7,877; Referees: Arturo Di Giacomo (BEL), Luis Macias (MEX) |

| 15 August 2016; 22:45 | Brazil | 3–1 | France | Ginásio do Maracanãzinho, Rio de Janeiro; Attendance: 9,800; Referees: Juraj Mokrý (SVK), Nasr Shaaban (EGY) |
| 15 August 2016; 22:45 | (25–22, 22–25, 25–20, 25–23); Results Statistics | | | Ginásio do Maracanãzinho, Rio de Janeiro; Attendance: 9,800; Referees: Juraj Mokrý (SVK), Nasr Shaaban (EGY) |

== Water polo ==
Summary

Key:
- FT – After full time.
- P – Match decided by penalty-shootout.

| Team | Event | Group Stage | | | | | | Quarterfinal | Semifinal | Final / BM | |
| Team | Event | Opposition Score | Opposition Score | Opposition Score | Opposition Score | Opposition Score | Rank | Opposition Score | Opposition Score | Opposition Score | Rank |
|---|---|---|---|---|---|---|---|---|---|---|---|
| France men's | Men's tournament | Montenegro; L 4–7 | Italy; L 8–11 | United States; L 3–6 | Spain; L 4–10 | Croatia; W 9–8 | 6 | did not advance | | | 11 |

=== Men's tournament ===
France men's water polo team qualified for the Olympics by virtue of a top four finish at the Olympic Qualification Tournament in Trieste, signifying the nation's Olympic comeback to the sport for the first time since 1992.

Team roster

The following is the French roster in the men's water polo tournament of the 2016 Summer Olympics.

Head coach: Florian Bruzzo

| № | Name | Pos. | Height | Weight | Date of birth | 2016 club |
|---|---|---|---|---|---|---|
| 1 | Rémi Garsau | GK | 1.90 m (6 ft 3 in) | 82 kg (181 lb) | 19 July 1984 | (France) CN Marseille |
| 2 | Rémi Saudadier | CF | 1.98 m (6 ft 6 in) | 95 kg (209 lb) | 20 March 1986 | (Germany) Spandau 04 |
| 3 | Igor Kovacevic | CB | 1.90 m (6 ft 3 in) | 88 kg (194 lb) | 3 November 1988 | (France) CN Marseille |
| 4 | Enzo Khasz | CF | 2.03 m (6 ft 8 in) | 105 kg (231 lb) | 13 August 1993 | (France) CN Marseille |
| 5 | Romain Blary | CF | 1.95 m (6 ft 5 in) | 103 kg (227 lb) | 20 October 1985 | (France) Team Strasbourg |
| 6 | Thibaut Simon | D | 1.92 m (6 ft 4 in) | 98 kg (216 lb) | 18 December 1983 | (France) CN Marseille |
| 7 | Ugo Crousillat | D | 1.90 m (6 ft 3 in) | 94 kg (207 lb) | 27 October 1990 | (Hungary) Szolnoki Dózsa |
| 8 | Michal Iždinský | D | 1.78 m (5 ft 10 in) | 75 kg (165 lb) | 23 July 1992 | (France) Olympic Nice |
| 9 | Mehdi Marzouki | D | 1.92 m (6 ft 4 in) | 103 kg (227 lb) | 26 May 1987 | (Germany) Spandau 04 |
| 10 | Mathieu Peisson | CB | 1.85 m (6 ft 1 in) | 105 kg (231 lb) | 29 September 1982 | (France) Team Strasbourg |
| 11 | Petar Tomašević | D | 1.92 m (6 ft 4 in) | 102 kg (225 lb) | 2 January 1989 | (France) Olympic Nice |
| 12 | Alexandre Camarasa (c) | CF | 1.93 m (6 ft 4 in) | 104 kg (229 lb) | 10 June 1987 | (France) CN Marseille |
| 13 | Jonathan Moriamé | GK | 2.03 m (6 ft 8 in) | 104 kg (229 lb) | 19 June 1984 | (France) CN Noisy |

Group play

| Pos | Team | Pld | W | D | L | GF | GA | GD | Pts | Qualification |
|---|---|---|---|---|---|---|---|---|---|---|
| 1 | Spain | 5 | 3 | 1 | 1 | 46 | 35 | +11 | 7 | Quarter-finals |
| 2 | Croatia | 5 | 3 | 0 | 2 | 37 | 37 | 0 | 6 | Quarter-finals |
| 3 | Italy | 5 | 3 | 0 | 2 | 40 | 41 | −1 | 6 | Quarter-finals |
| 4 | Montenegro | 5 | 2 | 1 | 2 | 36 | 32 | +4 | 5 | Quarter-finals |
| 5 | United States | 5 | 2 | 0 | 3 | 35 | 35 | 0 | 4 | |
| 6 | France | 5 | 1 | 0 | 4 | 28 | 42 | −14 | 2 | |

Source: Rio2016
Rules for classification: 1) Points; 2) Head-to-head points; 3) Head-to-head goal difference; 4) Head-to-head goals scored; 5) Goal difference.

| 6 August 2016; 19:30 | Report | France | 4–7 | Montenegro | Maria Lenk Aquatic Center, Rio de Janeiro; Referees: Mark Koganov (AZE), Péter Molnár (HUN) |
| 6 August 2016; 19:30 | Report | Score by quarters: 0–2, 0–3, 1–0, 3–2 | | | Maria Lenk Aquatic Center, Rio de Janeiro; Referees: Mark Koganov (AZE), Péter Molnár (HUN) |
| 6 August 2016; 19:30 | Report | four players 1 | Goals | Radović 3 | Maria Lenk Aquatic Center, Rio de Janeiro; Referees: Mark Koganov (AZE), Péter Molnár (HUN) |

| 8 August 2016; 10:20 | Report | Italy | 11–8 | France | Maria Lenk Aquatic Center, Rio de Janeiro; Referees: Radosław Koryzna (POL), Sergey Naumov (RUS) |
| 8 August 2016; 10:20 | Report | Score by quarters: 4–3, 4–1, 1–2, 2–2 | | | Maria Lenk Aquatic Center, Rio de Janeiro; Referees: Radosław Koryzna (POL), Sergey Naumov (RUS) |
| 8 August 2016; 10:20 | Report | Aicardi 4 | Goals | three players 2 | Maria Lenk Aquatic Center, Rio de Janeiro; Referees: Radosław Koryzna (POL), Sergey Naumov (RUS) |

| 10 August 2016; 11:40 | Report | France | 3–6 | United States | Maria Lenk Aquatic Center, Rio de Janeiro; Referees: German Moller (ARG), Adrian Alexandrescu (ROU) |
| 10 August 2016; 11:40 | Report | Score by quarters: 1–1, 0–4, 0–0, 2–1 | | | Maria Lenk Aquatic Center, Rio de Janeiro; Referees: German Moller (ARG), Adrian Alexandrescu (ROU) |
| 10 August 2016; 11:40 | Report | three players 1 | Goals | Samuels 3 | Maria Lenk Aquatic Center, Rio de Janeiro; Referees: German Moller (ARG), Adrian Alexandrescu (ROU) |

| 12 August 2016; 20:50 | Report | Spain | 10–4 | France | Maria Lenk Aquatic Center, Rio de Janeiro; Referees: Fabio Toffoli (BRA), Péter Molnár (HUN) |
| 12 August 2016; 20:50 | Report | Score by quarters: 3–1, 3–0, 1–1, 3-2 | | | Maria Lenk Aquatic Center, Rio de Janeiro; Referees: Fabio Toffoli (BRA), Péter Molnár (HUN) |
| 12 August 2016; 20:50 | Report | Echenique 3 | Goals | Crousillat 2 | Maria Lenk Aquatic Center, Rio de Janeiro; Referees: Fabio Toffoli (BRA), Péter Molnár (HUN) |

| 14 August 2016; 16:50 | Report | France | 9–8 | Croatia | Olympic Aquatics Stadium, Rio de Janeiro; Referees: Ni Shi Wei (CHN), Hatem Gaber (EGY) |
| 14 August 2016; 16:50 | Report | Score by quarters: 3–2, 3–3, 2–1, 1–2 | | | Olympic Aquatics Stadium, Rio de Janeiro; Referees: Ni Shi Wei (CHN), Hatem Gaber (EGY) |
| 14 August 2016; 16:50 | Report | Marzouki 3 | Goals | Sukno 3 | Olympic Aquatics Stadium, Rio de Janeiro; Referees: Ni Shi Wei (CHN), Hatem Gaber (EGY) |

== Weightlifting ==
French weightlifters have qualified three men's quota places for the Rio Olympics based on their combined team standing by points at the 2014 and 2015 IWF World Championships. A single women's Olympic spot had been added to the French roster by virtue of a top six national finish at the 2016 European Championships. The team must allocate these places to individual athletes by 20 June 2016.

The weightlifting team was named as part of the second batch of nominated athletes to the Olympic roster on 7 June 2016, with Benjamin Hennequin going to his third straight Olympics. Meanwhile, Kévin Bouly was added to the French weightlifting roster on 24 June 2016, following the omission of several weightlifters from the rankings list at the World Championships and their failure on the doping tests.

| Athlete | Event | Snatch | | Clean & Jerk | | Total | Rank |
| Athlete | Event | Result | Rank | Result | Rank | Total | Rank |
|---|---|---|---|---|---|---|---|
| Bernardin Kingue Matam | Men's −69 kg | 140 | =12 | 180 | 6 | 320 | 7 |
| Giovanni Bardis | Men's −85 kg | 165 | 8 | 192 | 12 | 357 | 9 |
| Benjamin Hennequin | Men's −85 kg | 155 | 11 | 195 | 11 | 350 | 10 |
| Kévin Bouly | Men's −94 kg | 155 | 13 | 190 | 12 | 345 | 12 |
| Gaëlle Nayo-Ketchanke | Women's −75 kg | 102 | 8 | 135 | 5 | 237 | 8 |

== Wrestling ==
France has qualified two wrestlers for each the following weight classes into the Olympic competition. One of them finished among the top six to book an Olympic spot in the men's freestyle 74 kg at the 2015 World Championships, while the other had claimed the remaining slot in the women's freestyle 75 kg to round out the French roster at the initial meet of the World Qualification Tournament in Ulaanbaatar.

Key:
- VT – Victory by fall.
- VF – Victory by forfeit
- PP – Decision by points – the loser with technical points.
- PO – Decision by points – the loser without technical points.
- ST – Great superiority – the loser without technical points and a margin of victory of at least 8 (Greco-Roman) or 10 (freestyle) points.

Men's freestyle

| Athlete | Event | Qualification | Round of 16 | Quarterfinal | Semifinal | Repechage 1 | Repechage 2 | Final / BM | |
| Athlete | Event | Opposition Result | Opposition Result | Opposition Result | Opposition Result | Opposition Result | Opposition Result | Opposition Result | Rank |
|---|---|---|---|---|---|---|---|---|---|
| Zelimkhan Khadjiev | −74 kg | Yadav (IND); W 5–0 ^{VF} | Takatani (JPN); L 1–3 ^{PP} | did not advance | | | | | 8 |

Women's freestyle

| Athlete | Event | Qualification | Round of 16 | Quarterfinal | Semifinal | Repechage 1 | Repechage 2 | Final / BM | |
| Athlete | Event | Opposition Result | Opposition Result | Opposition Result | Opposition Result | Opposition Result | Opposition Result | Opposition Result | Rank |
|---|---|---|---|---|---|---|---|---|---|
| Cynthia Vescan | −75 kg | Bye | Marzaliuk (BLR); L 0–5 ^{VT} | did not advance | | | | | 16 |

== See also ==
- France at the 2016 Summer Paralympics
