= Rose Thomas (rugby union) =

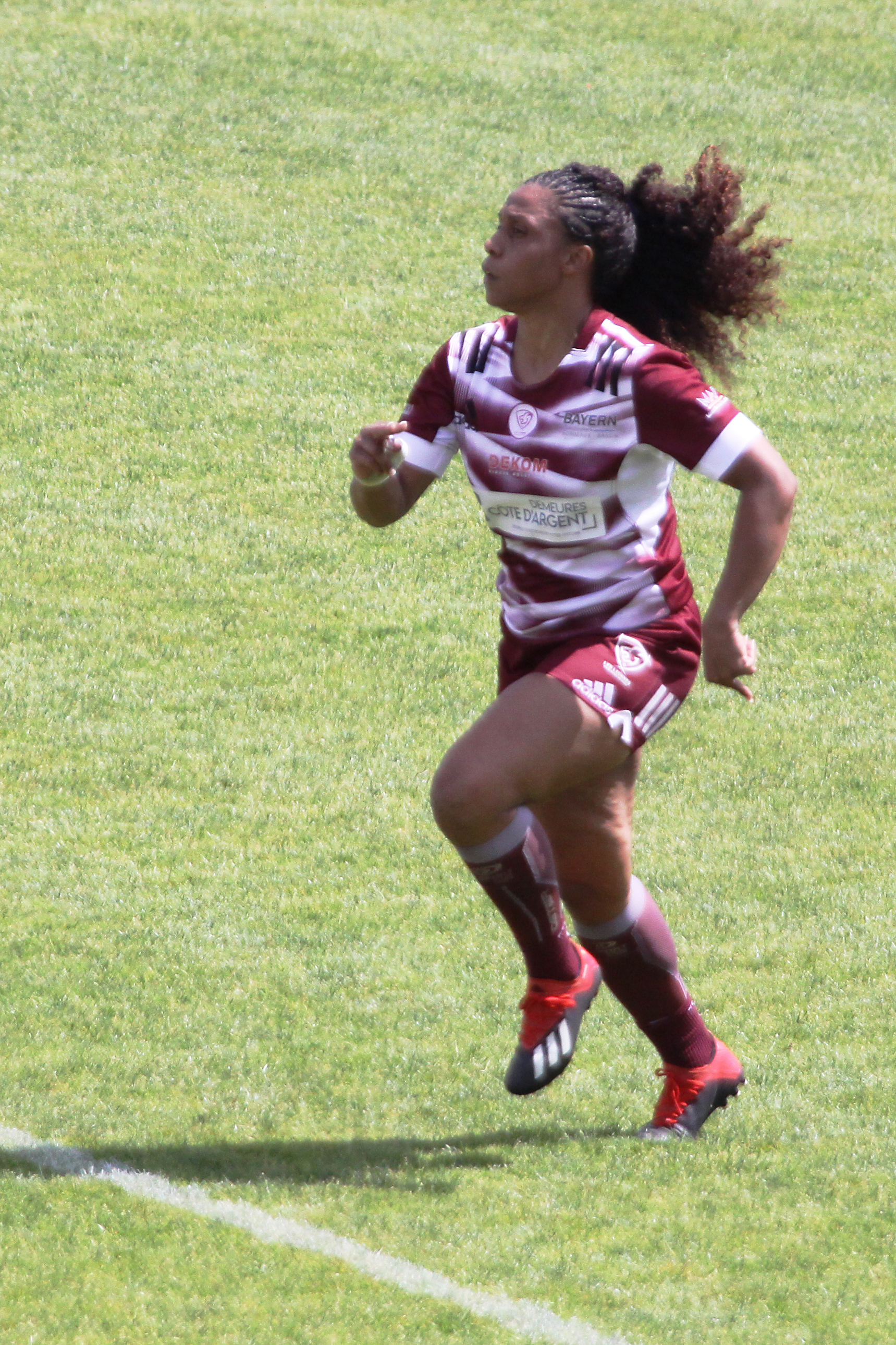
- Born: 29 November 1988 (age 37)
- Height: 1.63 m (5 ft 4 in)
- Weight: 66 kg (146 lb; 10 st 6 lb)

Rugby union career
National sevens team
Years	Team	Comps
- France

Rose Thomas (born 29 November 1988) is a French rugby sevens player. She was selected as a member of the France women's national rugby sevens team to the 2016 Summer Olympics. She made the last try in the second round of the 2015 Rugby Europe Women's Sevens Championships to help France beat Spain 20-0 and qualify for the Olympics.
