= Australia at the 2016 Summer Olympics =

- IOC code: AUS
- NOC: Australian Olympic Committee
- Website: www.olympics.com.au

in Rio de Janeiro
- Competitors: 421 in 26 sports
- Flag bearers: Anna Meares (opening); Kim Brennan (closing)
- Medals Ranked 10th: Gold 8 Silver 11 Bronze 10 Total 29

Summer Olympics appearances (overview)
- 1896; 1900; 1904; 1908; 1912; 1920; 1924; 1928; 1932; 1936; 1948; 1952; 1956; 1960; 1964; 1968; 1972; 1976; 1980; 1984; 1988; 1992; 1996; 2000; 2004; 2008; 2012; 2016; 2020; 2024; 2028

Other related appearances
- 1906 Intercalated Games –––– Australasia (1908–1912)

Australia competed at the 2016 Summer Olympics in Rio de Janeiro, Brazil, from 5 to 21 August 2016. Australia is one of only five countries to have sent athletes to every Summer Olympics of the modern era, alongside Great Britain, France, Greece, and Switzerland.

At the end of these Olympics, Australia was ranked in tenth position on the medal table with a total of 29 medals (8 gold, 11 silver, and 10 bronze). This was Australia's lowest medal tally and lowest rank since the 1992 Olympics in Barcelona where Australia also ranked tenth but only won 27 medals.

== Medallists ==
The following Australian competitors won medals at the games. In the by discipline sections below, medallists' names are bolded.

Medal	Name	Sport	Event	Date
Gold	Mack Horton	Swimming	Men's 400 m freestyle	6 August
Gold	Bronte Campbell; Cate Campbell; Brittany Elmslie; Emma McKeon; Madison Wilson^{*}	Swimming	Women's 4 × 100 m freestyle relay	6 August
Gold	Catherine Skinner	Shooting	Women's trap	7 August
Gold	Australia women's national rugby sevens team: Nicole Beck; Charlotte Caslick; Emilee Cherry; Chloe Dalton; Gemma Etheridge; Ellia Green; Shannon Parry; Evania Pelite; Alicia Quirk; Emma Tonegato; Amy Turner; Sharni Williams	Rugby sevens	Women's tournament	8 August
Gold	Kyle Chalmers	Swimming	Men's 100 m freestyle	10 August
Gold	Kim Brennan	Rowing	Women's single sculls	13 August
Gold	Tom Burton	Sailing	Men's Laser	16 August
Gold	Chloe Esposito	Modern pentathlon	Women's event	19 August
Silver	Madeline Groves	Swimming	Women's 200 m butterfly	10 August
Silver	Jessica Ashwood^{*} Bronte Barratt; Tamsin Cook; Emma McKeon; Leah Neale	Swimming	Women's 4 × 200 m freestyle relay	10 August
Silver	Alexander Belonogoff; Karsten Forsterling; Cameron Girdlestone; James McRae	Rowing	Men's quadruple sculls	11 August
Silver	Mitch Larkin	Swimming	Men's 200 m backstroke	11 August
Silver	Josh Booth; Josh Dunkley-Smith; Alexander Hill; Will Lockwood	Rowing	Men's coxless four	12 August
Silver	Jack Bobridge; Alex Edmondson; Michael Hepburn; Sam Welsford	Cycling	Men's team pursuit	12 August
Silver	Cate Campbell; Brittany Elmslie*; Madeline Groves*; Emma McKeon; Taylor McKeown; Emily Seebohm; Madison Wilson*	Swimming	Women's 4 × 100 m medley relay	13 August
Silver	Jason Waterhouse; Lisa Darmanin	Sailing	Nacra 17	16 August
Silver	Mathew Belcher; William Ryan	Sailing	Men's 470	18 August
Silver	Nathan Outteridge; Iain Jensen	Sailing	Men's 49er	18 August
Silver	Jared Tallent	Athletics	50 km walk	19 August
Bronze	Alec Potts; Ryan Tyack; Taylor Worth	Archery	Men's team	6 August
Bronze	Maddison Keeney; Anabelle Smith	Diving	Women's 3 m synchronized springboard	7 August
Bronze	Matthew Abood^{*} Kyle Chalmers; James Magnussen; James Roberts; Cameron McEvoy	Swimming	Men's 4 × 100 m freestyle relay	7 August
Bronze	Chris Burton; Sam Griffiths; Shane Rose; Stuart Tinney	Equestrian	Team eventing	9 August
Bronze	Emma McKeon	Swimming	Women's 200 m freestyle	9 August
Bronze	Jessica Fox	Canoeing	Women's slalom K-1	11 August
Bronze	Dane Bird-Smith	Athletics	Men's 20 km walk	12 August
Bronze	Anna Meares	Cycling	Women's keirin	13 August
Bronze	Kyle Chalmers; Mitch Larkin; Cameron McEvoy*; David Morgan; Jake Packard	Swimming	Men's 4 × 100 m medley relay	13 August
Bronze	Lachlan Tame; Ken Wallace	Canoeing	Men's K-2 1000 m	18 August

Medals by sport
**Sport**	1st place, gold medalist(s)	2nd place, silver medalist(s)	3rd place, bronze medalist(s)	Total
Swimming	3	4	3	10
Sailing	1	3	0	4
Rowing	1	2	0	3
Modern pentathlon	1	0	0	1
Rugby sevens	1	0	0	1
Shooting	1	0	0	1
Athletics	0	1	1	2
Cycling	0	1	1	2
Canoeing	0	0	2	2
Archery	0	0	1	1
Diving	0	0	1	1
Equestrian	0	0	1	1
Total	8	11	10	29

Medals by date
**Date**	1st place, gold medalist(s)	2nd place, silver medalist(s)	3rd place, bronze medalist(s)	Total
6 Aug	2	0	1	3
7 Aug	1	0	2	3
8 Aug	1	0	0	1
9 Aug	0	0	2	2
10 Aug	1	2	0	3
11 Aug	0	2	1	3
12 Aug	0	2	1	3
13 Aug	1	1	2	4
14 Aug	0	0	0	0
15 Aug	0	0	0	0
16 Aug	1	1	0	2
17 Aug	0	0	0	0
18 Aug	0	2	1	3
19 Aug	1	1	0	2
20 Aug	0	0	0	0
21 Aug	0	0	0	0
Total	8	11	10	29

Medals by gender
**Gender**	1st place, gold medalist(s)	2nd place, silver medalist(s)	3rd place, bronze medalist(s)	**Total**
Male	3	7	6	16
Female	5	3	4	12
Mixed	0	1	0	1
Total	8	11	10	29

Multiple medallists
**Name**	**Sport**	1st place, gold medalist(s)	2nd place, silver medalist(s)	3rd place, bronze medalist(s)	**Total**
Emma McKeon	Swimming	1	2	1	4
Madison Wilson	Swimming	1	1	0	2
Cate Campbell	Swimming	1	1	0	2
Brittany Elmslie	Swimming	1	1	0	2
Kyle Chalmers	Swimming	1	0	2	3
Madeline Groves	Swimming	0	2	0	2
Mitch Larkin	Swimming	0	1	1	2
Cameron McEvoy	Swimming	0	0	2	2

^{*} – Indicates the athlete competed in preliminaries but not the final relay.

== Competitors ==
Kitty Chiller, who competed as a modern pentathlete at the 2000 Summer Olympics in Sydney, was selected as the team's Chef de Mission, the first female to hold the role for Australia.

Sport	Men	Women	Total
Archery	3	1	4
Athletics	29	30	59
Badminton	3	2	5
Basketball	12	12	24
Boxing	2	1	3
Canoeing	12	4	16
Cycling	17	14	31
Diving	4	5	9
Equestrian	7	5	12
Field hockey	16	16	32
Football	0	18	18
Golf	2	2	4
Gymnastics	1	2	3
Judo	4	3	7
Modern pentathlon	1	1	2
Rowing	13	16	29
Rugby sevens	13	12	25
Sailing	7	4	11
Shooting	12	6	18
Swimming	19	20	39
Synchronized swimming	—	9	9
Table tennis	3	3	6
Taekwondo	2	2	4
Tennis	6	4	10
Triathlon	3	3	6
Volleyball	0	4	4
Water polo	13	13	26
Weightlifting	1	1	2
Wrestling	3	0	3
Total	208	213	421

== Funding ==
In May 2014 Australian Sports Minister Peter Dutton announced that 650 Australian athletes identified as medal prospects would receive funding directly from a newly designed program that reallocated A$1.6 million from the Direct Athlete Support program.

In the lead up to the Rio Olympics, the Australian Sports Commission advised that it had invested A$376.7 million to high performance sports in the Rio cycle 2012–2016. This amount includes funding to Winter Olympics and non-Olympic sports.

== Archery ==
Three Australian archers qualified for the men's events after having secured a top eight finish in the team recurve at the 2015 World Archery Championships in Copenhagen, Denmark. Another Australian archer has been added to the squad by finishing in the top two of the women's individual recurve at the Oceania Qualification Tournament in Nuku'alofa, Tonga.

The men's team (Potts, Tyack, and Worth) was officially named to the Australian roster for the Games on 31 May 2016, with Alice Ingley joining them on her Olympic debut in the women's individual archery one month later.

Athlete	Event	Ranking round		Round of 64	Round of 32	Round of 16	Quarterfinals	Semifinals	Final / BM	
Athlete	Event	Score	Seed	Opposition Score	Opposition Score	Opposition Score	Opposition Score	Opposition Score	Opposition Score	Rank
Alec Potts	Men's individual	666	20	Oliveira (BRA); L 4–6	Did not advance					
Ryan Tyack	Men's individual	665	23	Ramaekers (BEL); L 2–6	Did not advance					
Taylor Worth	Men's individual	674	14	El-Nemr (EGY); W 6–0	Malavé (VEN); W 6–4	Fernández (ESP); W 7–3	Ku B-c (KOR); L 5–6	Did not advance		
Alec Potts; Ryan Tyack; Taylor Worth	Men's team	2005	4	—N/a		Bye	France; W 5–3	South Korea; L 0–6	China; W 6–2	3rd place, bronze medalist(s)
Alice Ingley	Women's individual	593	58	Boari (ITA); W 7–1	dos Santos (BRA); L 0–6	Did not advance				

== Athletics ==
Australian athletes have so far achieved qualifying standards in the following athletics events (up to a maximum of 3 athletes in each event). The team selected its athletes with a specific qualifying standard based on the results at the 2016 Australian Championships and Olympic Trials (31 March to 3 April) in Sydney.

On 8 January 2016, the Australian Olympic Committee had selected the two long-distance runners (one each in both men's and women's 10,000 m) and three race walkers, including three-time Olympic medallist Jared Tallent, in the men's 50 km (31 mi). Twenty-seven track and field athletes were announced on 3 April 2016, following the completion of the Australian Championships. Six marathon runners (three per gender) were named to the Australian team on 12 May 2016, and were followed by three 20 km (12 mi) race walkers and one long-distance runner at the first of week of June 2016.

On 29 June 2016, sprint hurdler and reigning Olympic champion Sally Pearson withdrew from the Games due to a hamstring injury, with middle-distance runner Melissa Duncan following her with the same incident two weeks later.

On 30 July 2016, sprinter Josh Clarke withdrew from the Games after failing to fully recover from a hamstring injury that he suffered in the early months of the year.

Monica Brennan was selected for the women's 4 × 400 m relay team, but did not run in either heat or final.

Key

- Note–Ranks given for track events are within the athlete's heat only
- Q = Qualified for the next round
- q = Qualified for the next round as a fastest loser or, in field events, by position without achieving the qualifying target
- NR = National record
- N/A = Round not applicable for the event
- Bye = Athlete not required to compete in round

Men
Track & road events

Athlete	Event	Heat		Semifinal		Final	
Athlete	Event	Result	Rank	Result	Rank	Result	Rank
Alex Hartmann	200 m	21.02	5	Did not advance			
Peter Bol	800 m	1:49.36	6	Did not advance			
Luke Mathews	800 m	1:50.40	7	Did not advance			
Jeff Riseley	800 m	1:46.93	4	Did not advance			
Ryan Gregson	1500 m	3:39.13	2 Q	3:40.02	4 Q	3:51.39	9
Luke Mathews	1500 m	3:44.51	12	Did not advance			
Sam McEntee	5000 m	13:50.55	18	—N/a		Did not advance	
Brett Robinson	5000 m	13:22.81	9 q	—N/a		13:32.30	14
Patrick Tiernan	5000 m	13:28.48	13	—N/a		Did not advance	
David McNeill	10000 m	—N/a				27:51.71	16
Ben St Lawrence	10000 m	—N/a				28:46.32	28
Liam Adams	Marathon	—N/a				2:16:12	31
Michael Shelley	Marathon	—N/a				2:18:06	47
Scott Westcott	Marathon	—N/a				2:22:19	81
Dane Bird-Smith	20 km walk	—N/a				1:19:37	3rd place, bronze medalist(s)
Rhydian Cowley	20 km walk	—N/a				1:23:30	33
Chris Erickson	50 km walk	—N/a				3:48:40	9
Brendon Reading	50 km walk	—N/a				4:13:02	39
Jared Tallent	50 km walk	—N/a				3:41:16	2nd place, silver medalist(s)

Women

Athlete	Event	Heat		Semifinal		Final	
Athlete	Event	Result	Rank	Result	Rank	Result	Rank
Melissa Breen	100 m	11.74	7	Did not advance			
Ella Nelson	200 m	22.66	2 Q	22.50	3	Did not advance	
Morgan Mitchell	400 m	51.30	2 Q	52.68	8	Did not advance	
Anneliese Rubie	400 m	51.92	3 q	51.96	6	Did not advance	
Selma Kajan	800 m	2:05.20	7	Did not advance			
Jenny Blundell	1500 m	4:09.05	8 q	4:13.25	11	Did not advance	
Zoe Buckman	1500 m	4:06.93	6 Q	4:06.95	9	Did not advance	
Linden Hall	1500 m	4:11.75	4 Q	4:05.81	8	Did not advance	
Madeline Hills	5000 m	15:21.33	6 q	—N/a		15:04.05	10
Genevieve LaCaze	5000 m	15:20.45	7 q	—N/a		15:10.35	12
Eloise Wellings	5000 m	15:19.02	6 q	—N/a		15:01.59	9
Eloise Wellings	10000 m	—N/a				31:14.94	10
Michelle Jenneke	100 m hurdles	13.26	6	Did not advance			
Lauren Wells	400 m hurdles	56.26	4 q	56.83	7	Did not advance	
Madeline Hills	3000 m steeplechase	9:24.16	5 q	—N/a		9:20.38	7
Genevieve LaCaze	3000 m steeplechase	9:26.25	2 Q	—N/a		9:21.21	9
Victoria Mitchell	3000 m steeplechase	9:39.40	10	—N/a		Did not advance	
Morgan Mitchell; Anneliese Rubie; Caitlin Sargent; Jessica Thornton	4 × 400 m relay	3:25.71	4 q	—N/a		3:27.45	8
Milly Clark	Marathon	—N/a				2:30:53	18
Jessica Trengove	Marathon	—N/a				2:31:44	22
Lisa Weightman	Marathon	—N/a				2:34:41	31
Tanya Holliday	20 km walk	—N/a				1:34:22	26
Regan Lamble	20 km walk	—N/a				1:30:28	9
Rachel Tallent	20 km walk	—N/a				1:37:08	40

Field events
Men

Athlete	Event	Qualification		Final	
Athlete	Event	Distance	Position	Distance	Position
Henry Frayne	Long jump	8.01	6 q	8.06	7
Fabrice Lapierre	Long jump	7.96	8 q	7.87	10
Joel Baden	High jump	2.17	41	Did not advance	
Brandon Starc	High jump	2.29	11 q	2.20	15
Kurtis Marschall	Pole vault	5.60	10	Did not advance	
Damien Birkinhead	Shot put	20.50	9 q	20.45	10
Matthew Denny	Discus throw	61.16	19	Did not advance	
Benn Harradine	Discus throw	60.85	20	Did not advance	
Hamish Peacock	Javelin throw	77.91	25	Did not advance	
Joshua Robinson	Javelin throw	80.84	13	Did not advance	

Women

Athlete	Event	Qualification		Final	
Athlete	Event	Distance	Position	Distance	Position
Chelsea Jaensch	Long jump	6.41	17	Did not advance	
Brooke Stratton	Long jump	6.56	9 q	6.74	7
Eleanor Patterson	High jump	1.89	=22	Did not advance	
Alana Boyd	Pole vault	4.55	8 q	4.80	4
Dani Samuels	Discus throw	64.46	4 Q	64.90	4
Kim Mickle	Javelin throw	57.20	22	Did not advance	
Kathryn Mitchell	Javelin throw	61.63	12 q	64.36	6
Kelsey-Lee Roberts	Javelin throw	55.25	28	Did not advance	

Combined events – Men's decathlon

Athlete	Event	100 m	LJ	SP	HJ	400 m	110H	DT	PV	JT	1500 m	Final	Rank
Cedric Dubler	Result	10.86	7.47	11.49	2.13	48.18	14.30	38.89	4.90	51.82	4:32.12	8024	14
Cedric Dubler	Points	892	927	575	925	900	936	642	880	616	731	8024	14

== Badminton ==
Australia has qualified a total of six badminton players for each of the following events into the Olympic tournament based on the BWF World Rankings as of 5 May 2016: one entry each in the men's and women's singles, as well as the pair each in the men's and mixed doubles through the Oceania continental representation system.

With the option to select a maximum of two events under the continental representation system, the Australian Olympic Committee had decided to accept invitations for the men's doubles (Chau & Serasinghe) and mixed doubles (Middleton & Choo) instead. As there were no other Oceania places taken up in the women's singles, Taiwanese-born Chen Hsuan-yu (world no. 74) qualified directly on the World Rankings.

Athlete	Event	Group Stage				Elimination	Quarterfinal	Semifinal	Final / BM	
Athlete	Event	Opposition Score	Opposition Score	Opposition Score	Rank	Opposition Score	Opposition Score	Opposition Score	Opposition Score	Rank
Matthew Chau; Sawan Serasinghe	Men's doubles	Lee Y-d / Yoo Y-s (KOR); L (14–21, 16–21)	Ivanov / Sozonov (RUS); L (16–21, 16–21)	Lee S-m / Tsai C-h (TPE); L (14–21, 19–21)	4	—N/a	Did not advance			
Chen Hsuan-yu	Women's singles	Buranaprasertsuk (THA); L (14–21, 15–21)	Foo Kune (MRI); L (16–21, 19–21)	—N/a	3	Did not advance				
Robin Middleton; Leanne Choo	Mixed doubles	Ahmad / Natsir (INA); L (7–21, 8–21)	Chan P S / Goh L Y (MAS); L (17–21, 15–21)	Isara / Amitrapai (THA); L (13–21, 18–21)	4	—N/a	Did not advance			

== Basketball ==
=== Men's tournament ===
Australia men's basketball team qualified for the Olympics by winning the 2015 FIBA Oceania Championship in Melbourne and Wellington.

Team roster

The following is the Australia roster in the men's basketball tournament of the 2016 Summer Olympics.

Australia men's national basketball team – 2016 Summer Olympics roster
Players
Coaches

Pos.	No.	Name	Age – Date of birth	Height	Club	Ctr.
SG	4	Chris Goulding	27 – 24 October 1988	1.92 m (6 ft 4 in)	Melbourne United	(Australia)
PG	5	Patty Mills	27 – 11 August 1988	1.83 m (6 ft 0 in)	San Antonio Spurs	(United States)
C	6	Andrew Bogut	31 – 28 November 1984	2.06 m (6 ft 9 in)	Dallas Mavericks	(United States)
SF	7	Joe Ingles	28 – 2 October 1987	2.03 m (6 ft 8 in)	Utah Jazz	(United States)
G	8	Matthew Dellavedova	25 – 8 September 1990	1.93 m (6 ft 4 in)	Milwaukee Bucks	(United States)
G/F	9	Ryan Broekhoff	25 – 23 August 1990	2.01 m (6 ft 7 in)	Lokomotiv-Kuban	(Russia)
F/C	10	Cameron Bairstow	25 – 7 December 1990	2.06 m (6 ft 9 in)	Brisbane Bullets	(Australia)
G	11	Kevin Lisch	30 – 16 May 1986	1.88 m (6 ft 2 in)	Sydney Kings	(Australia)
C	12	Aron Baynes	29 – 9 December 1986	2.08 m (6 ft 10 in)	Boston Celtics	(United States)
F/C	13	David Andersen (C)	36 – 23 June 1980	2.11 m (6 ft 11 in)	ASVEL Basket	(France)
PF	14	Brock Motum	25 – 16 October 1990	2.08 m (6 ft 10 in)	Žalgiris Kaunas	(Lithuania)
PG	15	Damian Martin	31 – 5 September 1984	1.86 m (6 ft 1 in)	Perth Wildcats	(Australia)

Head coach

- (Australia) Andrej Lemanis

Assistant coach(es)

- (Australia) Trevor Gleeson
- (Australia) Luc Longley
- (Australia) Will Weaver
- (Australia) Dr. Adrian Hurley
- (Australia) Mick Downer

Legend

- (C) Team captain
- Club – describes last
  club before the tournament
- Age – describes age
  on 6 August 2016

Group play

Pos	Team	Pld	W	L	PF	PA	PD	Pts	Qualification
1	United States	5	5	0	524	407	+117	10	Quarterfinals
2	Australia	5	4	1	444	368	+76	9	Quarterfinals
3	France	5	3	2	423	378	+45	8	Quarterfinals
4	Serbia	5	2	3	426	387	+39	7	Quarterfinals
5	Venezuela	5	1	4	315	444	−129	6	
6	China	5	0	5	318	466	−148	5	

Source: FIBA
Rules for classification: 1) points; 2) head-to-head points; 3) head-to-head points difference; 4) head-to-head number of points scored.

6 August 2016
14:15

Boxscore

Australia	87–66	France
Scoring by quarter: 20–14, 16–19, 25–15, 26–18
Pts: Mills 21; Rebs: Baynes 8 Asts: Dellavedova 10		Pts: Parker 18; Rebs: Gobert 6 Asts: Diaw, Heurtel 3

Carioca Arena 1, Rio de Janeiro
Attendance: 8,719
Referees: Cristiano Maranho (BRA), Steven Anderson (USA), Ferdinand Pascual (PHI)

8 August 2016
14:15

Boxscore

Serbia	80–95	Australia
Scoring by quarter: 23–26, 20–14, 20–22, 17–33
Pts: Raduljica 25; Rebs: Bogdanović 8 Asts: Marković 4		Pts: Mills 26; Rebs: Bogut 12; Asts: Dellavedova 13

Carioca Arena 1, Rio de Janeiro
Attendance: 5,409
Referees: Cristiano Maranho (BRA), Borys Ryzhyk (UKR), Guilherme Locatelli (BRA)

10 August 2016
19:00

Boxscore

Australia	88–98	United States
Scoring by quarter: 29–29, 25–20, 13–21, 21–28
Pts: Mills 30; Rebs: Dellavedova 6 Asts: Dellavedova 11		Pts: Anthony 31; Rebs: Anthony, Cousins 8 Asts: Irving 5

Carioca Arena 1, Rio de Janeiro
Attendance: 10,957
Referees: Christos Christodoulou (GRE), Juan Carlos García (ESP), Robert Lottermoser (GER)

12 August 2016
14:15

Boxscore

China	68–93	Australia
Scoring by quarter: 14–17, 20–27, 16–21, 18–28
Pts: Yi 20; Rebs: Yi 9 Asts: Guo 5		Pts: Bairstow 17; Rebs: Bairstow 9 Asts: Dellavedova 8

Carioca Arena 1, Rio de Janeiro
Attendance: 7,704
Referees: Roberto Vázquez (PUR), Sreten Radović (CRO), Carlos Peruga (ESP)

14 August 2016
19:00

Boxscore

Australia	81–56	Venezuela
Scoring by quarter: 16–6, 16–19, 21–18, 28–13
Pts: Goulding 22; Rebs: Broekhoff 8 Asts: Martin 4		Pts: Perez 12; Rebs: Vargas, Ruiz 4 Asts: Vargas 7

Carioca Arena 1, Rio de Janeiro
Attendance: 9,459
Referees: Stephen Seibel (CAN), Sreten Radović (CRO), Carlos Peruga (ESP)

Quarterfinal

17 August 2016
11:00

Boxscore

Australia	90–64	Lithuania
Scoring by quarter: 26–17, 22–13, 22–13, 20–21
Pts: Mills 24; Rebs: Bogut 7 Asts: Bogut 6		Pts: Kalnietis, Kavaliauskas 12; Rebs: Valančiūnas 8 Asts: Kalnietis 5

Carioca Arena 1, Rio de Janeiro
Attendance: 9,348
Referees: Steven Anderson (USA), Stephen Seibel (CAN), Piotr Pastusiak (POL)

Semifinal

19 August 2016
19:00

Boxscore

Australia	61–87	Serbia
Scoring by quarter: 5–16, 9–19, 24–31, 23–21
Pts: Mills, Motum 13; Rebs: Baynes 8 Asts: Broekhoff 4		Pts: Teodosić 22; Rebs: Jokić 11; Asts: Teodosić 5

Carioca Arena 1, Rio de Janeiro
Attendance: 9,655
Referees: Stephen Seibel (CAN), Robert Lottermoser (GER), Oļegs Latiševs (LAT)

Bronze medal match

21 August 2016
11:30

Boxscore

Australia	88–89	Spain
Scoring by quarter: 17–23, 21–17, 26–27, 24–22
Pts: Mills 30; Rebs: Lisch, Motum 6 Asts: Dellavedova 8		Pts: Gasol 31; Rebs: Gasol 11; Asts: Rodríguez 5

Carioca Arena 1, Rio de Janeiro
Attendance: 9,449
Referees: Ilija Belošević (SRB), Steven Anderson (USA), Roberto Vázquez (PUR)

=== Women's tournament ===
Australia women's basketball team qualified for the Olympics by winning the 2015 FIBA Oceania Championships in Melbourne and Tauranga.

Team roster

The following is the Australia roster in the women's basketball tournament of the 2016 Summer Olympics.

Australia women's national basketball team – 2016 Summer Olympics roster
Players
Coaches

Pos.	No.	Name	Age – Date of birth	Height	Club	Ctr.
PG	4	Tessa Lavey	23 – 29 March 1993	1.71 m (5 ft 7 in)	Perth Lynx	(Australia)
G	5	Leilani Mitchell	31 – 15 June 1985	1.65 m (5 ft 5 in)	Adelaide Lightning	(Australia)
SF	6	Stephanie Talbot	22 – 15 June 1994	1.86 m (6 ft 1 in)	Gorzów Wlkp.	(Poland)
G	7	Penny Taylor (C)	35 – 24 May 1981	1.85 m (6 ft 1 in)	Phoenix Mercury	(United States)
C	8	Liz Cambage	24 – 18 August 1991	2.03 m (6 ft 8 in)	Shanghai Boashan Dahua	(China)
F/C	9	Natalie Burton	27 – 23 March 1989	1.94 m (6 ft 4 in)	Perth Lynx	(Australia)
PF	10	Rachel Jarry	24 – 6 December 1991	1.86 m (6 ft 1 in)	Basket Lattes	(France)
F/C	11	Laura Hodges	32 – 13 December 1983	1.90 m (6 ft 3 in)	Adelaide Lightning	(Australia)
SG	12	Katie-Rae Ebzery	26 – 8 January 1990	1.78 m (5 ft 10 in)	Dynamo Moscow	(Russia)
G	13	Erin Phillips	31 – 19 May 1985	1.73 m (5 ft 8 in)	Dallas Wings	(United States)
C	14	Marianna Tolo	27 – 2 July 1989	1.96 m (6 ft 5 in)	Canberra Capitals	(Australia)
F	15	Cayla George	27 – 1 May 1989	1.94 m (6 ft 4 in)	UNIQA Sopron	(Hungary)

Head coach

- (Australia) Brendan Joyce

Assistant coach(es)

- (Australia) Scott Butler
- (Australia) Lori Chizik
- (Australia) Damian Cotter

Legend

- (C) Team captain
- Club – describes last
  club before the tournament
- Age – describes age
  on 6 August 2016

Group play

Pos	Team	Pld	W	L	PF	PA	PD	Pts	Qualification
1	Australia	5	5	0	400	345	+55	10	Quarter-finals
2	France	5	3	2	344	343	+1	8 (Note: Head-to-head record: France 3 pts, +8 PD; Turkey 3 pts, −2 PD; Japan 3 pts, −6 PD)	Quarter-finals
3	Turkey	5	3	2	324	325	−1	8	Quarter-finals
4	Japan	5	3	2	386	378	+8	8	Quarter-finals
5	Belarus	5	1	4	347	361	−14	6	
6	Brazil (H)	5	0	5	335	384	−49	5	

Source: FIBA
Rules for classification: 1) points; 2) head-to-head points; 3) head-to-head points difference; 4) head-to-head number of points scored.
(H) Hosts
Notes:

6 August 2016
17:30

Boxscore

Brazil	66–84	Australia
Scoring by quarter: 24–14, 15–21, 14–22, 13–27
Pts: Castro Marques 25; Rebs: dos Santos 13; Asts: Pinto 7		Pts: Cambage 20; Rebs: Cambage 14; Asts: Mitchell 6

Youth Arena, Rio de Janeiro
Attendance: 2,368
Referees: Ilija Belošević (SRB), Karen Lasuik (CAN), Piotr Pastusiak (POL)

7 August 2016
17:30

Boxscore

Australia	61–56	Turkey
Scoring by quarter: 12–15, 14–14, 17–12, 18–15
Pts: Cambage 22; Rebs: Cambage 11; Asts: three players 3		Pts: Sanders 25; Rebs: Sanders 7 Asts: Vardarlı 7

Youth Arena, Rio de Janeiro
Attendance: 1,853
Referees: Anne Panther (GER), Leandro Lezcano (ARG), Carlos Peruga (ESP)

9 August 2016
12:15

Boxscore

Australia	89–71	France
Scoring by quarter: 21–19, 25–10, 23–21, 20–21
Pts: Taylor 31; Rebs: Cambage 7 Asts: Taylor 9		Pts: Epoupa 15; Rebs: Epoupa 7 Asts: Bouderra 4

Youth Arena, Rio de Janeiro
Attendance: 1,481
Referees: Borys Ryzhyk (UKR), Duan Zhu (CHN), Hwang In-tae (KOR)

11 August 2016
17:45

Boxscore

Japan	86–92	Australia
Scoring by quarter: 24–23, 26–25, 21–11, 15–33
Pts: Tokashiki 23; Rebs: Kurihara, Tokashiki 7 Asts: Yoshida 11		Pts: Cambage 37; Rebs: Cambage 10; Asts: Mitchell, Taylor 7

Youth Arena, Rio de Janeiro
Attendance: 3,315
Referees: Anne Panther (GER), Leandro Lezcano (ARG), Ahmed Al-Bulushi (OMA)

13 August 2016
12:15

Boxscore

Australia	74–66	Belarus
Scoring by quarter: 22–25, 14–14, 16–20, 22–7
Pts: Cambage 17; Rebs: Cambage 9 Asts: Lavey 6		Pts: Harding 16; Rebs: Leuchanka 7 Asts: Likhtarovich, Leuchanka 4

Youth Arena, Rio de Janeiro
Attendance: 3,081
Referees: Karen Lasuik (CAN), Duan Zhu (CHN), Nadege Zouzou (CIV)

Quarterfinal

16 August 2016
11:00

Boxscore

Australia	71–73	Serbia
Scoring by quarter: 20–20, 17–15, 15–16, 19–22
Pts: Cambage 29; Rebs: Cambage 11; Asts: Taylor 9		Pts: A. Dabović 24; Rebs: four players 4 Asts: Petrović 5

Carioca Arena 1, Rio de Janeiro
Attendance: 5,630
Referees: Eddie Viator (FRA), Karen Lasuik (CAN), Natalia Cuello (DOM)

== Boxing ==
Australia has entered three boxers to compete in each of the following weight classes into the Olympic boxing tournament. Daniel Lewis, Jason Whateley, and 2014 Commonwealth Games champion Shelley Watts claimed their Olympic spots at the 2016 Asia & Oceania Qualification Tournament in Qian'an, China.

Athlete	Event	Round of 32	Round of 16	Quarterfinals	Semifinals	Final	
Athlete	Event	Opposition Result	Opposition Result	Opposition Result	Opposition Result	Opposition Result	Rank
Daniel Lewis	Men's middleweight	Jabłoński (POL); W 2–1	Melikuziev (UZB); L 0–3	Did not advance			
Jason Whateley	Men's heavyweight	Nogueira (BRA); L 0–3	Did not advance				
Shelley Watts	Women's lightweight	—N/a	Testa (ITA); L 1–2	Did not advance			

== Canoeing ==
=== Slalom ===
Australian canoeists have qualified a maximum of one boat in each of the following classes through the 2015 ICF Canoe Slalom World Championships and the 2016 Oceania Championships. They must also compete at the Australian Open and in two trials of the Oceania Championships, both held in Penrith, New South Wales, to assure their selection to the nation's Olympic slalom canoeing team.

On 25 February 2016, the Australian Olympic Committee had announced the entire Olympic team of slalom canoeists for the Games, including 2012 Olympic silver medallist Jessica Fox in the women's K-1.

Athlete	Event	Preliminary						Semifinal		Final	
Athlete	Event	Run 1	Rank	Run 2	Rank	Best	Rank	Time	Rank	Time	Rank
Ian Borrows	Men's C-1	97.40	5	151.77	17	97.40	9 Q	101.32	11	Did not advance	
Lucien Delfour	Men's K-1	94.30	13	138.72	21	94.30	17	Did not advance			
Jessica Fox	Women's K-1	107.88	8	99.51	2	99.51	2 Q	104.50	5 Q	102.49	3rd place, bronze medalist(s)

=== Sprint ===
Australian canoeists have qualified one boat in each of the following events through the 2015 ICF Canoe Sprint World Championships and the 2016 Oceania Championships (the first of 2 Olympic selection trials). They must also compete at the 2016 Australian National Sprint Championships in Perth ( 2 to 8 March) to assure their selection to the nation's Olympic sprint canoeing team.

The entire Olympic team of sprint canoe and kayak paddlers were named on 16 March 2016, featuring two of men's K-4 1000 m champions Murray Stewart and Jacob Clear, 2008 Olympic gold medallist Ken Wallace, and three-time bronze medallist Martin Marinov, who has been set to appear at his fifth Games. Meanwhile, London 2012 Olympian Naomi Flood became the last sprint canoeist to join the Australian team for the Games at the ICF World Cup meet ( 18 to 20 May) in Duisburg, Germany.

Men

Athlete	Event	Heats		Semifinals		Final	
Athlete	Event	Time	Rank	Time	Rank	Time	Rank
Ferenc Szekszárdi	C-1 200 m	44.292	6	Did not advance			
Martin Marinov	C-1 1000 m	4:33.166	5 Q	4:24.723	7 FB	4:15.524	15
Martin Marinov; Ferenc Szekszárdi	C-2 1000 m	4:07.372	4 Q	4:13.754	5 FB	4:10.238	10
Stephen Bird	K-1 200 m	34.650	2 Q	34.584	2 FA	36.426	8
Murray Stewart	K-1 1000 m	3:36.210	2 Q	3:32.602	1 FA	3:33.741	4
Daniel Bowker; Jordan Wood	K-2 200 m	34.246	6 Q	34.845	6 FB	35.33	11
Lachlan Tame; Ken Wallace	K-2 1000 m	3:23.019	2 Q	3:16.635	1 FA	3:12.59	3rd place, bronze medalist(s)
Jacob Clear; Riley Fitzsimmons; Jordan Wood; Ken Wallace	K-4 1000 m	2:55.666	3 Q	2:58.222	1 FA	3:06.731	4

Women

Athlete	Event	Heats		Semifinals		Final	
Athlete	Event	Time	Rank	Time	Rank	Time	Rank
Naomi Flood	K-1 500 m	1:54.150	6 Q	2:01.910	6	Did not advance	
Alyssa Bull; Alyce Burnett	K-2 500 m	1:46.933	7 Q	1:44.290	3 FA	1:51.915	8

Qualification Legend: FA = Qualify to final (medal); FB = Qualify to final B (non-medal)

== Cycling ==
=== Road ===
Australian riders qualified for the following quota places in the men's and women's Olympic road race by virtue of their top 15 final national ranking in the 2015 UCI World Tour (for men) and top 22 in the UCI World Ranking (for women).

Three men's road riders (Rohan Dennis, Simon Gerrans and Richie Porte) were named to the Australian cycling team for the Games on 5 July 2016, with the women (Gracie Elvin, Katrin Garfoot, Rachel Neylan and Amanda Spratt) joining them a week later. On 17 July, Gerrans withdrew from the squad, three days after fracturing his collarbone in a crash during Stage 12 of the 2016 Tour de France. Instead, Simon Clarke took over the vacant spot.

Men

Athlete	Event	Time	Rank
Scott Bowden	Road race	Did not finish	
Simon Clarke	Road race	6:16:17	25
Rohan Dennis	Road race	Did not finish	
Rohan Dennis	Time trial	1:13:25.66	5
Richie Porte	Road race	Did not finish	
Richie Porte	Time trial	Did not start	

Women

Athlete	Event	Time	Rank
Gracie Elvin	Road race	4:03:01	49
Katrin Garfoot	Road race	Did not finish	
Katrin Garfoot	Time trial	45:35.03	9
Rachel Neylan	Road race	3:56:34	22
Amanda Spratt	Road race	3:55:36	15

=== Track ===
Following the completion of the 2016 UCI Track Cycling World Championships, Australian riders have accumulated spots in both men's and women's team pursuit, and men's and women's team sprint, as well as both the men's and women's omnium. As a result of their place in the men's and women's team sprint, Australia has won the right to enter two riders in both men's and women's sprint and men's and women's keirin.

The full Australian track cycling team was officially named on 5 July 2016, with Anna Meares looking to defend the women's Olympic sprint title at her fourth straight Games.

Sprint

Athlete	Event	Qualification		Round 1	Repechage 1	Round 2	Repechage 2	Quarterfinals	Semifinals	Final	
Athlete	Event	Time Speed (km/h)	Rank	Opposition Time Speed (km/h)	Opposition Time Speed (km/h)	Opposition Time Speed (km/h)	Opposition Time Speed (km/h)	Opposition Time Speed (km/h)	Opposition Time Speed (km/h)	Opposition Time Speed (km/h)	Rank
Patrick Constable	Men's sprint	10.010; 71.928	17 Q	Skinner (GBR); L	Zieliński (POL); Kelemen (CZE); W 10.363; 69.477	Skinner (GBR); L	Levy (GER); Hoogland (NED); W 10.456; 68.859	Kenny (GBR); L, L	Did not advance	5th place final Eilers (GER); Xu C (CHN); Baugé (FRA); L	8
Matthew Glaetzer	Men's sprint	9.704; 74.196	3 Q	Puerta (COL); W 10.299; 69.909	Bye	Levy (GER); W 10.166; 70.824	Bye	Eilers (GER); W 10.456, W 10.401	Skinner (GBR); L, L	Dmitriev (RUS); L, L	4
Anna Meares	Women's sprint	10.947; 65.771	9 Q	Krupeckaitė (LTU); L	Ismayilova (AZE) van Riessen (NED); W 11.716; 61.454	Lee (HKG); L	Zhong Ts (CHN); Welte (GER); L	Did not advance		9th place final Cueff (FRA); Hansen (NZL); Welte (GER); L	10
Stephanie Morton	Women's sprint	10.875; 66.206	8 Q	Voynova (RUS); L	Cueff (FRA); Gong Jj (CHN); L	Did not advance					

Team sprint

Athlete	Event	Qualification		Semifinals		Final	
Athlete	Event	Time Speed (km/h)	Rank	Opposition Time Speed (km/h)	Rank	Opposition Time Speed (km/h)	Rank
Patrick Constable; Matthew Glaetzer; Nathan Hart	Men's team sprint	43.158; 62.560	3 Q	Netherlands; W 43.166; 62.549	4 FB	France; L 43.298; 62.358	4
Anna Meares; Stephanie Morton	Women's team sprint	32.881; 54.742	4 Q	Netherlands; W 32.636; 55.153	3 FB	Germany; L 32.658; 55.116	4

Qualification legend: FA=Gold medal final; FB=Bronze medal final

Pursuit

Athlete	Event	Qualification		Semifinals		Final	
Athlete	Event	Time	Rank	Opponent Results	Rank	Opponent Results	Rank
Jack Bobridge; Alex Edmondson; Michael Hepburn; Callum Scotson; Sam Welsford	Men's team pursuit	3:55.606	3 Q	Denmark; 3:53.429	2	Great Britain; 3:51.008	2nd place, silver medalist(s)
Ashlee Ankudinoff; Georgia Baker; Amy Cure; Annette Edmondson; Melissa Hoskins	Women's team pursuit	4:19.059	3 Q	United States; 4:12.282	5	Italy; 4:21.232	5

Keirin

Athlete	Event	1st Round	Repechage	2nd Round	Final
Athlete	Event	Rank	Rank	Rank	Rank
Patrick Constable	Men's keirin	5 R	5	Did not advance	
Matthew Glaetzer	Men's keirin	2 Q	Bye	4	10
Anna Meares	Women's keirin	2 Q	Bye	1 Q	3rd place, bronze medalist(s)
Stephanie Morton	Women's keirin	5 R	2	Did not advance	

Omnium

Athlete	Event	Scratch race		Individual pursuit			Elimination race		Time trial			Flying lap			Points race		Total points	Rank
Athlete	Event	Rank	Points	Time	Rank	Points	Rank	Points	Time	Rank	Points	Time	Rank	Points	Points	Rank	Total points	Rank
Glenn O'Shea	Men's omnium	4	34	4:28.350	11	20	10	22	1:02.332	2	38	13.053	6	30	0	14	144	7
Annette Edmondson	Women's omnium	6	30	3:33.818	7	28	5	32	34.938	1	40	13.878	2	38	0	16	168	8

=== Mountain biking ===
Australian mountain bikers qualified for two men's and one women's quota place into the Olympic cross-country race, as a result of the nation's eighth-place finish for men and fifteenth for women in the UCI Olympic Ranking List of 25 May 2016. London 2012 Olympian Rebecca Henderson was the first mountain biker to be officially named to the Australian team on 5 July 2016, with Daniel McConnell and Scott Bowden joining her one-week later.

Athlete	Event	Time	Rank
Scott Bowden	Men's cross-country	LAP (1 lap)	36
Daniel McConnell	Men's cross-country	1:38:42	16
Rebecca Henderson	Women's cross-country	LAP (2 laps)	25

=== BMX ===
Australian riders qualified for three men's and two women's quota places in BMX at the Olympics, as a result of the nation's third-place finish for men and first for women in the UCI Olympic Ranking List of 31 May 2016. The BMX cycling team was named to the Australian roster on 5 July 2016.

Athlete	Event	Seeding		Quarterfinal		Semifinal		Final	
Athlete	Event	Result	Rank	Points	Rank	Points	Rank	Result	Rank
Anthony Dean	Men's BMX	35.44	20	4	1 Q	3	1 Q	DNF	8
Bodi Turner	Men's BMX	35.33	12	18	5	Did not advance			
Sam Willoughby	Men's BMX	34.71	2	3	1 Q	3	1 Q	36.303	6
Caroline Buchanan	Women's BMX	34.75	2	—N/a		13	5	Did not advance	
Lauren Reynolds	Women's BMX	35.66	10	—N/a		17	6	Did not advance	

== Diving ==
Australian divers qualified for eight individual spots and one synchronized team at the Olympics through the 2015 FINA World Championships and the 2016 FINA World Cup series. They must compete at the 2016 Australian Open Championships to assure their selection to the Olympic team. A total of nine divers (four men and five women) were named to the Olympic team on 29 June 2016, with Beijing 2008 silver medallist Melissa Wu leading them for her third straight Games. Brittany O'Brien replaced Brittany Broben who withdrew due to injury.

Men

Athlete	Event	Preliminaries		Semifinals		Final	
Athlete	Event	Points	Rank	Points	Rank	Points	Rank
Kevin Chávez	3 m springboard	356.55	26	Did not advance			
Grant Nel	3 m springboard	395.05	16 Q	368.35	15	Did not advance	
Domonic Bedggood	10 m platform	413.85	17 Q	454.95	11 Q	403.80	12
James Connor	10 m platform	457.05	9 Q	419.10	15	Did not advance	

Women

Athlete	Event	Preliminaries		Semifinals		Final	
Athlete	Event	Points	Rank	Points	Rank	Points	Rank
Maddison Keeney	3 m springboard	323.35	8 Q	326.35	4 Q	349.65	5
Esther Qin	3 m springboard	347.25	5 Q	315.65	10 Q	344.10	6
Brittany O'Brien	10 m platform	290.30	17 Q	300.05	15	Did not advance	
Melissa Wu	10 m platform	342.80	4 Q	346.00	4 Q	368.30	5
Maddison Keeney; Anabelle Smith	3 m synchronized springboard	—N/a				299.19	3rd place, bronze medalist(s)

== Equestrian ==
Australia is expected to be confirmed as having qualified a complete team in dressage by finishing in tenth position in the team event at the 2014 FEI World Equestrian Games, held in Normandy, France. The team will qualify as the top ranked nation from South East Asia, Oceania, Africa and the Middle East. The Australian eventing team also qualified for Rio by finishing fifth at the same World Games.

=== Dressage ===
Dressage shortlist is expected to be announced by 15 April. Final dressage team was named after the FEI Nations Cup event in Rotterdam (23–26 June 2016).

Having been selected initially, Kelly Layne later withdraw following a minor injury to her horse. She was replaced by Sue Hearn on 23 July.

Athlete	Horse	Event	Grand Prix		Grand Prix Special		Grand Prix Freestyle		Overall	
Athlete	Horse	Event	Score	Rank	Score	Rank	Score	Rank	Score	Rank
Mary Hanna	Boogie Woogie	Individual	69.643	39	Did not advance				69.643	39
Sue Hearn	Remmington	Individual	65.343	54	Did not advance				65.343	54
Kristy Oatley	Du Soleil	Individual	68.900	42	Did not advance				68.900	42
Lyndal Oatley	Sandro Boy	Individual	70.186	36	Did not advance				70.186	36
Mary Hanna; Sue Hearn; Kristy Oatley; Lyndal Oatley	See above	Team	69.576	9	Did not advance		—N/a		69.576	9

=== Eventing ===
The eventing team was named on 12 July 2016.

Athlete	Horse	Event	Dressage		Cross-country			Jumping						Total	
Athlete	Horse	Event	Dressage		Cross-country			Qualifier			Final			Total	
Athlete	Horse	Event	Penalties	Rank	Penalties	Total	Rank	Penalties	Total	Rank	Penalties	Total	Rank	Penalties	Rank
Chris Burton	Santana II	Individual	37.60	2	0.00	37.60	1	8.00	45.60	3 Q	8.00	53.60	=16	53.60	5
Sam Griffiths	Paulank Brockagh	Individual	46.30	22	6.80	53.10	9	0.00	53.10	6 Q	0.00	53.10	=1	53.10	4
Shane Rose	CP Qualified	Individual	42.50	13	Eliminated			Did not advance							
Stuart Tinney	Pluto Mio	Individual	56.80 #	58	2.80	59.60	14	17.00	76.60	21 Q	8.00	84.60	=16	84.60	22
Chris Burton; Sam Griffiths; Shane Rose; Stuart Tinney	See above	Team	126.40	3	9.60	150.30	1	25.00	175.30	3	—N/a			175.30	3rd place, bronze medalist(s)

"#" indicates that the score of this rider does not count in the team competition, since only the best three results of a team are counted.

=== Jumping ===
First two members of the jumping team (Keach and Tops-Alexander) were announced on 28 April 2016. The two remaining spots, Paterson-Robinson and Williams, were named on 28 June 2016, after FEI Nations Cup events in Linz, Odense and Sopot.

Athlete	Horse	Event	Qualification								Final					Total	
Athlete	Horse	Event	Round 1		Round 2			Round 3			Round A		Round B			Total	
Athlete	Horse	Event	Penalties	Rank	Penalties	Total	Rank	Penalties	Total	Rank	Penalties	Rank	Penalties	Total	Rank	Penalties	Rank
Scott Keach	Fedor	Individual	4	=27 Q	Eliminated			Did not advance									
James Paterson-Robinson	Amarillo	Individual	8	=53 Q	9	17	53	Did not advance									
Edwina Tops-Alexander	Caretina de Joter	Individual	0	=1 Q	5	5	=26 Q	4	9	23 Q	0	=1 Q	4	4	=14	4	=9
Matt Williams	Valinski	Individual	8	=53 Q	0	8	=30 Q	6	14	36 Q	8	=28	Did not advance				
Scott Keach; James Paterson-Robinson; Edwina Tops-Alexander; Matt Williams	See above	Team	12	12	14	—N/a	=13	Did not advance			—N/a					14	=13

"#" indicates that the score of this rider does not count in the team competition, since only the best three results of a team are counted.

== Field hockey ==
Summary

Key:

- FT – After full time.
- P – Match decided by penalty-shootout.

Team	Event	Group Stage						Quarterfinal	Semifinal	Final / BM	
Team	Event	Opposition Score	Opposition Score	Opposition Score	Opposition Score	Opposition Score	Rank	Opposition Score	Opposition Score	Opposition Score	Rank
Australia men's	Men's tournament	New Zealand; W 2–1	Spain; L 0–1	Belgium; L 0–1	Great Britain; W 2–1	Brazil; W 9–0	3	Netherlands; L 0–4	Did not advance		6
Australia women's	Women's tournament	Great Britain; L 1–2	United States; L 1–2	India; W 6–1	Argentina; W 1–0	Japan; W 2–0	3	New Zealand; L 2–4	Did not advance		6

=== Men's tournament ===
Australia men's field hockey team qualified for the Olympics by having achieved a top three finish at the second stop of the 2014–15 Men's FIH Hockey World League Semifinals. Only three nations qualified through this route, but India had already secured qualification as the continental champion after the team's success at the 2014 Asian Games, leaving the remaining teams automatically received three quotas.

Team roster

The following is the Australia roster in the men's field hockey tournament of the 2016 Summer Olympics. Aran Zalewski replaced Tristan White after he tore his posterior cruciate ligament a month before the games.

Head coach: Graham Reid

1. Jamie Dwyer
3. Simon Orchard
4. Glenn Turner
5. Chris Ciriello
6. Matt Dawson
9. Mark Knowles (C)
11. Eddie Ockenden
12. Jake Whetton
13. Blake Govers
16. Matthew Gohdes
17. Aran Zalewski
19. Tim Deavin
20. Matthew Swann
23. Daniel Beale
30. Andrew Charter (GK)
31. Fergus Kavanagh

Reserves:

- Jeremy Hayward
- Tom Craig
- Tyler Lovell

Group play

Pos	Team	Pld	W	D	L	GF	GA	GD	Pts	Qualification
1	Belgium	5	4	0	1	21	5	+16	12	Quarter-finals
2	Spain	5	3	1	1	13	6	+7	10	Quarter-finals
3	Australia	5	3	0	2	13	4	+9	9	Quarter-finals
4	New Zealand	5	2	1	2	17	8	+9	7	Quarter-finals
5	Great Britain	5	1	2	2	14	10	+4	5	
6	Brazil (H)	5	0	0	5	1	46	−45	0	

Source: Rio2016
Rules for classification: 1) Points; 2) Matches won; 3) Goal difference; 4) Goals for; 5) Head-to-head result.
(H) Hosts

6 August 2016
13:30

Australia	2–1	New Zealand
Ciriello 8'; Gohdes 23'	Report	Child 31'

Umpires:
Christian Blasch (GER)
Germán Montes de Oca (ARG)

7 August 2016
20:30

Australia	0–1	Spain
	Report	Casasayas 6'

Umpires:
Christian Blasch (GER)
Coen van Bunge (NED)

9 August 2016
20:30

Belgium	1–0	Australia
Cosyns 16'	Report

Umpires:
John Wright (RSA)
Marcin Grochal (POL)

10 August 2016
20:30

Great Britain	1–2	Australia
Jackson 58'	Report	Zalewski 50'; Whetton 55'

Umpires:
Marcin Grochal (POL)
John Wright (RSA)

12 August 2016
20:30

Australia	9–0	Brazil
Dwyer 7', 9'; Gohdes 11'; Turner 20', 24', 27'; Dawson 35'; Govers 45', 59'	Report

Umpires:
Javed Shaikh (IND)
Lim Hong Zhen (SIN)

Quarterfinal

14 August 2016
18:00

Netherlands	4–0	Australia
Bakker 1'; De Voogd 28'; Verga 33'; Van der Weerden 49'	Report

Umpires:
Christian Blasch (GER)
Paco Vázquez (ESP)

=== Women's tournament ===
Australia women's field hockey team qualified for the Olympics by having achieved a top three finish at the second stop of the 2014–15 Women's FIH Hockey World League Semifinals.

Team roster

The following is the Australia roster in the women's field hockey tournament of the 2016 Summer Olympics.

Head coach: Adam Commens

1. Gabrielle Nance
3. Brooke Peris
4. Casey Sablowski
6. Kirstin Dwyer
7. Jodie Kenny
11. Karri McMahon
12. Madonna Blyth (C)
13. Edwina Bone
17. Georgina Morgan
18. Jane Claxton
19. Georgie Parker
20. Kathryn Slattery
24. Mariah Williams
26. Emily Smith
27. Rachael Lynch (GK)
30. Grace Stewart

Reserves:

- TBD
- TBD

Group play

Pos	Team	Pld	W	D	L	GF	GA	GD	Pts	Qualification
1	Great Britain	5	5	0	0	12	4	+8	15	Quarter-finals
2	United States	5	4	0	1	14	5	+9	12	Quarter-finals
3	Australia	5	3	0	2	11	5	+6	9	Quarter-finals
4	Argentina	5	2	0	3	12	6	+6	6	Quarter-finals
5	Japan	5	0	1	4	3	16	−13	1	
6	India	5	0	1	4	3	19	−16	1	

Source: Rio2016
Rules for classification: 1) Points; 2) Matches won; 3) Goal difference; 4) Goals for; 5) Head-to-head result.

6 August 2016
20:30

Great Britain	2–1	Australia
Owsley 26'; Danson 43'	Report	Morgan 33'

Umpires:
Laurine Delforge (BEL)
Irene Presenqui (ARG)

8 August 2016
10:00

Australia	1–2	United States
Slattery 43'	Report	Vittese 25'; Van Sickle 41'

Umpires:
Elena Eskina (RUS)
Carolina de la Fuente (ARG)

10 August 2016
11:00

India	1–6	Australia
Thokchom 60'	Report	Slattery 5'; Morgan 9'; Claxton 35'; Parker 36'; Kenny 43', 46'

Umpires:
Soledad Iparraguiree (ARG)
Sarah Wilson (GBR)

11 August 2016
18:00

Australia	1–0	Argentina
Smith 33'	Report

Umpires:
Laurine Delforge (BEL)
Amy Baxter (USA)

13 August 2016
19:30

Australia	2–0	Japan
Williams 17'; Smith 55'	Report

Umpires:
Elena Eskina (RUS)
Kelly Hudson (NZL)

Quarterfinal

15 August 2016
10:00

New Zealand	4–2	Australia
McLaren 7'; Smith 24'; Flynn 39'; Merry 44'	Report	Slattery 33', 59'

Umpires:
Irene Presenqui (ARG)
Sarah Wilson (GBR)

== Football (soccer) ==
=== Women's tournament ===
Australia women's soccer team qualified for the Olympics, by virtue of a top two finish in the 2015–16 AFC Olympic Qualifying Tournament in Japan.

Team roster

Head coach: Alen Stajcic

Australia named a squad of 18 players and 4 alternates for the tournament, which was announced on 4 July 2016.

No.	Pos.	Player	Date of birth (age)	Caps	Goals	Club
1	GK	Lydia Williams	13 May 1988 (aged 28)	53	0	(United States Soccer Federation) Houston Dash
2	FW	Larissa Crummer	10 January 1996 (aged 20)	10	1	(Football Australia) Melbourne City
3	MF	Katrina Gorry	13 August 1992 (aged 23)	44	13	(Football Australia) Brisbane Roar
4	DF	Clare Polkinghorne (co-captain)	1 February 1989 (aged 27)	87	6	(Football Australia) Brisbane Roar
5	DF	Laura Alleway	28 November 1989 (aged 26)	44	2	(United States Soccer Federation) Orlando Pride
6	MF	Chloe Logarzo	22 December 1994 (aged 21)	8	0	(Swedish Football Association) Eskilstuna United
7	DF	Steph Catley	26 January 1994 (aged 22)	49	2	(United States Soccer Federation) Orlando Pride
8	MF	Elise Kellond-Knight	10 August 1990 (aged 25)	71	1	(German Football Association) 1. FFC Turbine Potsdam
9	MF	Caitlin Foord	11 November 1994 (aged 21)	45	7	(Football Australia) Perth Glory
10	MF	Emily van Egmond	12 July 1993 (aged 23)	53	14	(German Football Association) 1. FFC Frankfurt
11	FW	Lisa De Vanna (co-captain)	14 November 1984 (aged 31)	112	39	(Football Australia) Melbourne City
12	DF	Ellie Carpenter	28 April 2000 (aged 16)	3	0	(Football Australia) Western Sydney Wanderers
13	MF	Tameka Butt	16 June 1991 (aged 25)	55	7	(Swedish Football Association) Mallbacken
14	DF	Alanna Kennedy	21 January 1995 (aged 21)	43	1	(United States Soccer Federation) Western New York Flash
15	FW	Sam Kerr	10 September 1993 (aged 22)	43	7	(United States Soccer Federation) Sky Blue FC
16	FW	Michelle Heyman	4 July 1988 (aged 28)	48	18	(Football Australia) Canberra United
17	FW	Kyah Simon	25 June 1991 (aged 25)	65	20	(United States Soccer Federation) Boston Breakers
18	GK	Mackenzie Arnold	25 February 1994 (aged 22)	10	0	(Football Australia) Perth Glory

Group play

Pos	Team	Pld	W	D	L	GF	GA	GD	Pts	Qualification
1	Canada	3	3	0	0	7	2	+5	9	Quarter-finals
2	Germany	3	1	1	1	9	5	+4	4	Quarter-finals
3	Australia	3	1	1	1	8	5	+3	4	Quarter-finals
4	Zimbabwe	3	0	0	3	3	15	−12	0	

Source: Rio2016 & FIFA
Rules for classification: Tiebreakers
3 August 2016
15:00

Canada	2–0	Australia
Beckie 1'; Sinclair 80'	Report (Rio2016); Report (FIFA)

Arena Corinthians, São Paulo
Attendance: 20,521
Referee: Stéphanie Frappart (France)

6 August 2016
18:00

Germany	2–2	Australia
Däbritz 45+2'; Bartusiak 88'	Report (Rio2016); Report (FIFA)	Kerr 6'; Foord 45'

Arena Corinthians, São Paulo
Attendance: 37,475
Referee: Anna-Marie Keighley (New Zealand)

9 August 2016
16:00

Germany	1–2	Canada
Behringer 13' (pen.)	Report (Rio2016); Report (FIFA)	Tancredi 26', 60'

Estádio Nacional Mané Garrincha, Brasília
Attendance: 8,227
Referee: Ri Hyang-ok (North Korea)

Quarterfinal

12 August 2016
22:00

Brazil	0–0 (a.e.t.)	Australia
	Report (Rio2016); Report (FIFA)
Penalties
Andressa Alves (penalty scored); Andressinha (penalty scored); Beatriz (penalty scored); Rafaelle (penalty scored); Marta (penalty missed); Debinha (penalty scored); Mônica (penalty scored); Tamires (penalty scored)	7–6	(penalty scored) Kellond-Knight; (penalty scored) Alleway; (penalty scored) Van Egmond; (penalty scored) Polkinghorne; (penalty missed) Gorry; (penalty scored) Heyman; (penalty scored) Logarzo; (penalty missed) Kennedy

Mineirão, Belo Horizonte
Attendance: 52,660
Referee: Carol Chenard (Canada)

== Golf ==
Australia has entered four golfers (two per gender) into the Olympic tournament for the first time since 1904. Scott Hend (world no. 81), Marcus Fraser (world no. 86), and Korean-born Minjee Lee (world no. 14) and Su-Hyun Oh (world no. 41) qualified directly among the top 60 eligible players for their respective individual events based on the IGF World Rankings as of 11 July 2016.

Adam Scott, seventh in the men's world rankings, announced in April 2016 that he would not compete in Rio, choosing instead to focus on the 2016 PGA Tour. Marc Leishman, who was in line to be selected following Scott's withdrawal announced on 5 May 2016 that he would not play in Rio as his wife Audrey is recovering from toxic shock syndrome.

Athlete	Event	Round 1	Round 2	Round 3	Round 4	Total		
Athlete	Event	Score	Score	Score	Score	Score	Par	Rank
Marcus Fraser	Men's	63	69	72	72	276	−8	=5
Scott Hend	Men's	74	69	71	71	285	+1	=39
Minjee Lee	Women's	69	67	73	67	276	−8	=7
Su-Hyun Oh	Women's	71	72	66	70	279	−5	=13

== Gymnastics ==
=== Artistic ===
Australia has entered one artistic gymnast into the Olympic competition, failing to send any of the all-around teams for the first time since 1988. This Olympic berth had been awarded to the Australian female gymnast, who participated in the apparatus and all-around events at the Olympic Test Event in Rio de Janeiro. London 2012 Olympian Larrissa Miller was selected to her second Olympic team, as a result of her performances at the Australian Championships.

Women

Athlete	Event	Qualification						Final					
Athlete	Event	Apparatus				Total	Rank	Apparatus				Total	Rank
Athlete	Event	V	UB	BB	F	Total	Rank	V	UB	BB	F	Total	Rank
Larrissa Miller	Uneven bars	—N/a	14.533	—N/a		14.533	11	Did not advance					
Larrissa Miller	Floor	—N/a			12.733	12.733	38	Did not advance					

=== Rhythmic ===
Australia has qualified one rhythmic gymnast in the individual all-around for the Games by picking up the continental spot as Oceania's sole representative at the Olympic Test Event in Rio de Janeiro. The slot was awarded to rookie Danielle Prince.

Athlete	Event	Qualification						Final					
Athlete	Event	Hoop	Ball	Clubs	Ribbon	Total	Rank	Hoop	Ball	Clubs	Ribbon	Total	Rank
Danielle Prince	Individual	14.500	15.250	15.716	15.550	61.016	25	Did not advance					

=== Trampoline ===
Australia has qualified one gymnast in the men's trampoline by virtue of a top six finish at the 2016 Olympic Test Event in Rio de Janeiro. The slot was awarded to London 2012 Olympian Blake Gaudry.

Athlete	Event	Qualification		Final	
Athlete	Event	Score	Rank	Score	Rank
Blake Gaudry	Men's	105.450	13	Did not advance	

== Judo ==
Australia has qualified a total of seven judokas for each of the following weight classes at the Games. Six of them (four men and two women), including brothers Josh and Nathan Katz, were ranked among the top 22 eligible judokas for men and top 14 for women in the IJF World Ranking List of 30 May 2016, while 2014 Commonwealth Games bronze medallist Chloe Rayner at women's extra-lightweight (48 kg) earned a continental quota spot from the Oceania region as the highest-ranked Australian judoka outside of direct qualifying position. The judo team was officially named to the Olympic roster on 10 June 2016.

Men

Athlete	Event	Round of 64	Round of 32	Round of 16	Quarterfinals	Semifinals	Repechage	Final / BM	
Athlete	Event	Opposition Result	Opposition Result	Opposition Result	Opposition Result	Opposition Result	Opposition Result	Opposition Result	Rank
Josh Katz	−60 kg	Bye	Urozboev (UZB); L 000–010	Did not advance					
Nathan Katz	−66 kg	Bye	Bassou (MAR); L 000–001	Did not advance					
Jake Bensted	−73 kg	Bye	Mlugu (TAN); W 100–000	Orujov (AZE); L 000–100	Did not advance				
Eoin Coughlan	−81 kg	Bye	Lee S-s (KOR); L 000–100	Did not advance					

Women

Athlete	Event	Round of 32	Round of 16	Quarterfinals	Semifinals	Repechage	Final / BM	
Athlete	Event	Opposition Result	Opposition Result	Opposition Result	Opposition Result	Opposition Result	Opposition Result	Rank
Chloe Rayner	−48 kg	Payet (FRA); L 000–010	Did not advance					
Katharina Haecker	−63 kg	Sallés (AND); W 100–000	Tashiro (JPN); L 000–111	Did not advance				
Miranda Giambelli	−78 kg	Bye	Aguiar (BRA); L 000–100	Did not advance				

== Modern pentathlon ==
Australia has qualified the following athletes based on the results from the 2015 Asian/Oceania Championships.

Athlete	Event	Fencing (épée one touch)				Swimming (200 m freestyle)			Riding (show jumping)			Combined: shooting/running (10 m air pistol)/(3200 m)			Total points	Final rank
Athlete	Event	RR	BR	Rank	MP points	Time	Rank	MP points	Penalties	Rank	MP points	Time	Rank	MP Points	Total points	Final rank
Max Esposito	Men's	14–21	1	29	185	1:59.71	4	341	0	3	300	11:04.99	4	636	1462	7
Chloe Esposito	Women's	19–16	1	13	215	2:12.38	7	303	16	19	291	12:10.19	2	570	1372 OR	1st place, gold medalist(s)

== Rowing ==
Australia has qualified a total of eight boats for each of the following rowing classes into the Olympic regatta. Majority of the rowing crews had confirmed Olympic places for their boats at the 2015 FISA World Championships in Lac d'Aiguebelette, France, while a men's single sculls rower had added one more boat to the Australian roster as a result of his top three finish at the 2016 European & Final Qualification Regatta in Lucerne, Switzerland.

A total of 20 rowers (13 men and 7 women) were officially named to the Australian roster for the Games on 7 July 2016, with Kerry Hore leading the rowing team and racing with the women's quadruple sculls crew at her fourth Olympics.

On 26 July 2016, the women's eight berth was awarded to the Australian rowing team, as a response to the removal of four boats held by the Russians from FISA due to their previous doping bans and their implications in the "disappearing positive methodology" set out in the McClaren Report on Russia's state-sponsored doping.

Men

Athlete	Event	Heats		Repechage		Quarterfinals		Semifinals		Final	
Athlete	Event	Time	Rank	Time	Rank	Time	Rank	Time	Rank	Time	Rank
Rhys Grant	Single sculls	7:28.83	2 QF	Bye		6:55.14	2 SA/B	7:14.68	5 FB	6:51.90	9
Alex Lloyd; Spencer Turrin	Pair	6:40.79	1 SA/B	Bye		—N/a		6:25.25	2 FA	7:11.60	6
Chris Morgan; David Watts	Double sculls	6:36.39	2 SA/B	Bye		—N/a		6:19.36	5 FB	6:58.11	7
Josh Booth; Josh Dunkley-Smith; Alexander Hill; William Lockwood	Four	5:54.84	2 SA/B	Bye		—N/a		6:11.82	1 FA	6:00.44	2nd place, silver medalist(s)
Alexander Belonogoff; Karsten Forsterling; Cameron Girdlestone; James McRae	Quadruple sculls	5:50.98	1 FA	Bye		—N/a				6:07.96	2nd place, silver medalist(s)

Women

Athlete	Event	Heats		Repechage		Quarterfinals		Semifinals		Final	
Athlete	Event	Time	Rank	Time	Rank	Time	Rank	Time	Rank	Time	Rank
Kim Brennan	Single sculls	8:22.82	2 QF	—N/a		7:26.86	1 SA/B	7:47.88	1 FA	7:21.54	1st place, gold medalist(s)
Genevieve Horton; Sally Kehoe	Double sculls	7:17.34	2 SA/B	—N/a		—N/a		6:55.37	4 FB	7:42.30	9
Jessica Hall; Kerry Hore; Jennifer Cleary; Madeleine Edmunds	Quadruple sculls	6:37.43	2 R	6:28.60	5	—N/a				Did not advance	
Fiona Albert; Olympia Aldersey; Molly Goodman; Alexandra Hagan; Jessica Morrison; Lucy Stephan; Charlotte Sutherland; Meaghan Volker; Sarah Banting (cox)	Eight	6:22.68	4 R	6:40.45	5	—N/a				Did not advance	

Qualification Legend: FA=Final A (medal); FB=Final B (non-medal); FC=Final C (non-medal); FD=Final D (non-medal); FE=Final E (non-medal); FF=Final F (non-medal); SA/B=Semifinals A/B; SC/D=Semifinals C/D; SE/F=Semifinals E/F; QF=Quarterfinals; R=Repechage

== Rugby sevens ==
=== Men's tournament ===
The Australian men's team qualified for the Games by winning the 2015 FORU Men's Sevens Championships.

Team roster

The following is the Australia roster in the men's rugby sevens tournament of the 2016 Summer Olympics. Tom Kingston replaced injured Lewis Holland after he injured his hamstring on Day 1.

Head coach: Andy Friend

No.	Pos.	Player	Date of birth (age)	Events	Points	Union
1	FW	Nick Malouf	19 March 1993 (aged 23)	22	175	(Australia) University of Queensland
2	FW	Jesse Parahi	29 July 1989 (aged 27)	35	125	(Australia) Northern Suburbs
3	BK	Henry Hutchison	12 February 1997 (aged 19)	7	135	(Australia) Randwick
4	BK	Lewis Holland	14 January 1993 (aged 23)	31	469	(Australia) Queanbeyan Whites
5	BK	James Stannard	21 February 1983 (aged 33)	31	794	(Australia) Souths
6	FW	Con Foley	19 September 1992 (aged 23)	42	309	(Australia) University of Queensland
7	BK	Cameron Clark	20 March 1993 (aged 23)	30	632	(Australia) Northern Suburbs
8	FW	Pat McCutcheon	24 June 1987 (aged 29)	14	100	(Australia) Sydney University
9	FW	Ed Jenkins (c)	26 May 1986 (aged 30)	45	522	(Australia) Sydney University
10	FW	Allan Fa'alava'au	15 December 1993 (aged 22)	28	257	(Australia) Endeavour Hills
11	BK	John Porch	4 March 1994 (aged 22)	5	62	(Australia) Northern Suburbs
12	FW	Tom Cusack	1 March 1993 (aged 23)	15	60	(Australia) Canberra Royals
13	BK	Tom Kingston	19 June 1991 (aged 25)	9	45	(Australia) Sydney Stars

Group play

Pos	Team	Pld	W	D	L	PF	PA	PD	Pts	Qualification
1	South Africa	3	2	0	1	55	12	+43	7	Quarter-finals
2	France	3	2	0	1	57	45	+12	7	Quarter-finals
3	Australia	3	2	0	1	52	48	+4	7	Quarter-finals
4	Spain	3	0	0	3	17	76	−59	3	

Source: World Rugby
Rules for classification: 1) Points; 2) Head-to-head result; 3) Point difference; 4) Points scored.

9 August 2016
11:00

Australia	14–31	France
Try: Parahi 8' c Jenkins 9' c Con: Stannard (2/2)	Report (Rio 2016); Report (World Rugby)	Try: Bouhraoua (3) 4' c, 6' c, 14' c Dall'igna 13' c Con: Bouhraoua (3/3); Inigo (1/1); Pen: Bouhraoua (1/1) 7'

Deodoro Stadium, Rio de Janeiro
Referee: Mike Adamson (Great Britain)

9 August 2016
16:00

Australia	26–12	Spain
Try: Clark 1' c Parahi 7' c Porch 8' m Foley 14' c Con: Stannard (3/4)	Report (Rio 2016); Report (World Rugby)	Try: Poggi (2) 2' m, 4' c Con: Hernández (1/2)

Deodoro Stadium, Rio de Janeiro
Referee: Rasta Rasivhenge (South Africa)

10 August 2016
11:30

South Africa	5–12	Australia
Try: Senatla 11' m Con: Kolbe (0/1)	Report (Rio 2016); Report (World Rugby)	Try: Parahi 3' c Cusack 6' m Con: Stannard (1/2)

Deodoro Stadium, Rio de Janeiro
Referee: Alexandre Ruiz (France)

Quarterfinal

10 August 2016
18:30

South Africa	22–5	Australia
Try: Speckman 3' m Senatla 5' m, 12' m Brown 10' c Con: Afrika (1/4)	Report (Rio 2016); Report (World Rugby)	Try: Cusack 7' m Con: Clark (0/1)

Deodoro Stadium, Rio de Janeiro
Referee: Mike Adamson (Great Britain)

Classification semifinal (5–8)

11 August 2016
14:00

Argentina	26–21	Australia
Try: Revol (2) 7' m, 10' c Moroni (2) 11' c, 14' c Con: Revol (3/4)	Report (Rio 2016); Report (World Rugby)	Try: Cusack (2) 1' c, 2' c Foley 6' c Con: Stannard (3/3)

Deodoro Stadium, Rio de Janeiro
Referee: Marius van der Westhuizen (South Africa)

Seventh place match

11 August 2016
17:30

France	12–10	Australia
Try: Bouhraoua 6' m Candelon 8' c Con: Bouhraoua (1/2)	Report (Rio 2016); Report (World Rugby)	Try: Hutchison 1' m Jenkins 13' m Con: Stannard (0/2)

Deodoro Stadium, Rio de Janeiro
Referee: Nick Briant (New Zealand)

=== Women's tournament ===
The Australian women's team qualified for the Games by virtue of a third-place finish in the 2014–15 World Rugby Women's Sevens Series.

Team roster

The following is the Australia roster in the women's rugby sevens tournament of the 2016 Summer Olympics.

Head coach: Tim Walsh

Backs		Forwards
3	Nicole Beck	1	Shannon Parry (c)
5	Emma Tonegato	2	Sharni Williams (c)
6	Evania Pelite	4	Gemma Etheridge
7	Charlotte Caslick	8	Chloe Dalton
10	Alicia Quirk	9	Amy Turner
11	Emilee Cherry
12	Ellia Green

Group play

Pos	Team	Pld	W	D	L	PF	PA	PD	Pts	Qualification
1	Australia	3	2	1	0	101	12	+89	8	Quarter-finals
2	Fiji	3	2	0	1	48	43	+5	7	Quarter-finals
3	United States	3	1	1	1	67	24	+43	6	Quarter-finals
4	Colombia	3	0	0	3	0	137	−137	3	

Source: World Rugby
Rules for classification: 1) Points; 2) Head-to-head result; 3) Point difference; 4) Points scored.

6 August 2016
13:30

Australia	53–0	Colombia
Try: Williams 1' m Caslick (3) 3' c, 7' m, 8' c Tonegato 5' m Parry 7' m Beck (2) 10' c, 13' c Turner 12' m Con: Dalton (3/8); Etheridge (1/1)	Report (Rio 2016); Report (World Rugby)

Deodoro Stadium, Rio de Janeiro
Referee: Jess Beard (New Zealand)

6 August 2016
18:30

Australia	36–0	Fiji
Try: Cherry 1' c Tonegato (2) 4' m, 13' c Caslick 5' c Green 10' m Dalton 14' m Con: Dalton (3/6)	Report (Rio 2016); Report (World Rugby)

Deodoro Stadium, Rio de Janeiro
Referee: Sara Cox (Great Britain)

7 August 2016
13:30

Australia	12–12	United States
Try: Tonegato (2) 4' m, 14' c Con: Dalton (1/2)	Report (Rio 2016); Report (World Rugby)	Try: Javelet (2) 9' c, 11' m Con: Baravilala (1/2)

Deodoro Stadium, Rio de Janeiro
Referee: Alhambra Nievas (Spain)

Quarterfinal

7 August 2016
17:00

Australia	24–0	Spain
Try: Tonegato 3' m Caslick (2) 5' c, 9' c Green 14' m Con: Dalton (2/3); Etheridge (0/1)	Report (Rio 2016); Report (World Rugby)

Deodoro Stadium, Rio de Janeiro
Referee: Jess Beard (New Zealand)

Semifinal

8 August 2016
14:30

Australia	17–5	Canada
Try: Cherry (2) 2' c, 7' m Dalton 10' m Con: Dalton (1/3)	Report (Rio 2016); Report (World Rugby)	Try: Williams 13' m Con: Landry (0/1)

Deodoro Stadium, Rio de Janeiro
Referee: Rasta Rasivhenge (South Africa)

Gold medal match

8 August 2016
19:00

(gold) Australia	24–17	New Zealand (silver)
Try: Tonegato 7' m Pelite 10' m Green 12' c Caslick 15' c Con: Dalton (2/4)	Report 1 Report 2	Try: McAlister (2) 4' m, 18' m Woodman 20' c Con: Nathan-Wong (1/3)

Deodoro Stadium, Rio de Janeiro
Referee: Alhambra Nievas (Spain)

Team details

Australia
New Zealand

F	1	Shannon Parry
F	2	Sharni Williams (c)
F	8	Charlotte Caslick
B	7	Charlotte Caslick
B	11	Emilee Cherry
B	10	Alicia Quirk
B	5	Emma Tonegato
Head Coach:
(Australia) Tim Walsh

F	5	Sarah Goss (c)
F	9	Huriana Manuel
F	1	Ruby Tui
B	8	Tyla Nathan-Wong
B	12	Kayla McAlister
B	7	Tyla Nathan-Wong
B	11	Portia Woodman
Head Coach:
(New Zealand) Sean Horan

== Sailing ==
Australian sailors have qualified one boat in each of the following classes through the 2014 ISAF Sailing World Championships, the individual fleet Worlds, and Oceanian qualifying regattas. On 4 December 2015, the Australian Olympic Committee had announced the first three double-handed crews to compete at the Games, including defending champions Iain Jensen and Nathan Outteridge (49er) and Mathew Belcher (470). Laser sailor Tom Burton was named to the Australian team in March 2016, and was followed by two female sailing crews (Smith & Ryan in 470, and Stoddart in Laser Radial) two months later. Finn yachtsman Jake Lilley rounded out the selection at the end of May 2016.

Australian Sailing has decided to reject quota places earned by the sailors in the women's RS:X and 49erFX classes due to its performance standards set for the Games.

Men

Athlete	Event	Race													Net points	Final rank
Athlete	Event	1	2	3	4	5	6	7	8	9	10	11	12	M*	Net points	Final rank
Tom Burton	Laser	~~17~~	8	2	10	9	14	7	2	11	4	—N/a		6	73	1st place, gold medalist(s)
Jake Lilley	Finn	16	~~UFD~~	8	6	6	4	3	5	23	16	—N/a		10	97	8
Mathew Belcher; William Ryan	470	8	1	3	3	2	8	~~10~~	7	1	7	—N/a		18	58	2nd place, silver medalist(s)
Iain Jensen; Nathan Outteridge	49er	~~13~~	8	2	5	10	12	4	5	8	2	7	7	8	78	2nd place, silver medalist(s)

Women

Athlete	Event	Race											Net points	Final rank
Athlete	Event	1	2	3	4	5	6	7	8	9	10	M*	Net points	Final rank
Ashley Stoddart	Laser Radial	8	6	16	~~28~~	11	11	23	11	7	8	6	107	9
Jaime Ryan; Carrie Smith	470	16	8	11	~~17~~	7	6	14	15	17	12	EL	106	15

Mixed

Athlete	Event	Race													Net points	Final rank
Athlete	Event	1	2	3	4	5	6	7	8	9	10	11	12	M*	Net points	Final rank
Jason Waterhouse; Lisa Darmanin	Nacra 17	6	7	4	1	1	5	15	11	11	1	12	~~17~~	4	78	2nd place, silver medalist(s)

M = Medal race; EL = Eliminated – did not advance into the medal race; DSQ – Disqualified; RDG – Redress given; UFD – "U" flag disqualification
Discard is crossed out and does not count for the overall result.

== Shooting ==
Australian shooters have achieved quota places for the following events by virtue of their best finishes at the 2014 and 2015 ISSF World Championships, the 2015 ISSF World Cup series, and Oceanian Championships, as long as they have obtained a minimum qualifying score (MQS) by 31 March 2016. They must compete in two selection meets of the Australia Cup in Sydney to attain their benchmark scores and assure their selection to the Olympic team.

The Australian Olympic Committee confirmed a roster of sixteen shooters to the Olympic team in a selection event on 8 April 2016, with Belarusian-born Lalita Yauhleuskaya remarkably going to her sixth Olympics, reigning World champion Warren Potent to his fifth, and pistol ace Daniel Repacholi to his fourth.

Olympic trap veterans Michael Diamond and Adam Vella were initially selected to the team, but both were challenged by an appeal from rookie Mitchell Iles against his non-selection. Following criminal charges related to the use of firearms and drunk-driving, Diamond lost his bid to compete at seventh Olympics on 30 June 2016. With Diamond ruled ineligible for the Games, Shooting Australia had decided to officially nominate Vella and Iles, who won his appeal to the Court of Arbitration for Sport (CAS) one week earlier.

Men

Athlete	Event	Qualification		Semifinal		Final	
Athlete	Event	Points	Rank	Points	Rank	Points	Rank
Paul Adams	Skeet	118	19	Did not advance			
Blake Blackburn	10 m air pistol	570	36	—N/a		Did not advance	
David Chapman	25 m rapid fire pistol	551	26	—N/a		Did not advance	
Keith Ferguson	Skeet	120	10	Did not advance			
William Godward	50 m rifle 3 positions	1156	39	—N/a		Did not advance	
Mitchell Iles	Trap	110	26	Did not advance			
Warren Potent	50 m rifle prone	620.0	35	—N/a		Did not advance	
Daniel Repacholi	10 m air pistol	565	44	—N/a		Did not advance	
Daniel Repacholi	50 m pistol	545	28	—N/a		Did not advance	
Jack Rossiter	10 m air rifle	612.4	46	—N/a		Did not advance	
Dane Sampson	10 m air rifle	619.3	37	—N/a		Did not advance	
Dane Sampson	50 m rifle prone	620.6	31	—N/a		Did not advance	
Dane Sampson	50 m rifle 3 positions	1169	20	—N/a		Did not advance	
Adam Vella	Trap	115	12	Did not advance			
James Willett	Double trap	140 OR	2 Q	26 (+1)	5	Did not advance	

Women

Athlete	Event	Qualification		Semifinal		Final	
Athlete	Event	Points	Rank	Points	Rank	Points	Rank
Elena Galiabovitch	10 m air pistol	369	43	—N/a		Did not advance	
Elena Galiabovitch	25 m pistol	569	31	Did not advance			
Jennifer Hens	10 m air rifle	410.1	39	—N/a		Did not advance	
Aislin Jones	Skeet	63	17	Did not advance			
Laetisha Scanlan	Trap	70	1 Q	10	5	Did not advance	
Catherine Skinner	Trap	67	6 Q	14	1 Q	12	1st place, gold medalist(s)
Lalita Yauhleuskaya	10 m air pistol	379	24	—N/a		Did not advance	
Lalita Yauhleuskaya	25 m pistol	578	14	Did not advance			

Qualification Legend: Q = Qualify for the next round; q = Qualify for the bronze medal (shotgun)

== Swimming ==
Australian swimmers have so far achieved qualifying standards in the following events (up to a maximum of 2 swimmers in each event at the Olympic Qualifying Time (OQT), and potentially 1 at the Olympic Selection Time (OST)): To assure their nomination to the Olympic team, swimmers must finish in the top two of each individual pool events under both the benchmark standard and the FINA A-cut at the 2016 Australian Championships and Olympic Trials ( 7 to 14 April) in Adelaide.

A total of 34 swimmers (15 men and 19 women) were named to the Australian team for the Olympics at the end of the Australian Championships, featuring 2015 World backstroke double champions Mitch Larkin and Emily Seebohm, sisters Bronte and Cate Campbell, siblings David and Emma McKeon, London 2012 medallists Alicia Coutts and Bronte Barratt, and freestyle aces Cameron McEvoy (sprint) and Mack Horton (long-distance). Two months later, London 2012 silver medallist James Magnussen, along with his teammates James Roberts and rookie Matthew Abood were added to the team, as FINA confirmed Australia's quota spot in the men's 4 × 100 m freestyle relay, finishing among the top four nations, not yet qualified, in the World Ranking List as of 31 May 2016.

Men

Athlete	Event	Heat		Semifinal		Final	
Athlete	Event	Time	Rank	Time	Rank	Time	Rank
Matthew Abood	50 m freestyle	22.47	=33	Did not advance			
Josh Beaver	100 m backstroke	53.47	7 Q	53.95	13	Did not advance	
Josh Beaver	200 m backstroke	1:56.65	10 Q	1:56.57	10	Did not advance	
Kyle Chalmers	100 m freestyle	47.90 WJR	1 Q	47.88 WJR	2 Q	47.58 WJR	1st place, gold medalist(s)
Thomas Fraser-Holmes	200 m freestyle	1:46.49	9 Q	1:46.24	9	Did not advance	
Thomas Fraser-Holmes	200 m individual medley	DNS		Did not advance			
Thomas Fraser-Holmes	400 m individual medley	4:12.51	6 Q	—N/a		4:11.90	6
Mack Horton	400 m freestyle	3:43.84	2 Q	—N/a		3:41.55	1st place, gold medalist(s)
Mack Horton	1500 m freestyle	14:48.47	4 Q	—N/a		14:49.54	5
Grant Irvine	100 m butterfly	51.84	12 Q	51.87	13	Did not advance	
Grant Irvine	200 m butterfly	1:55.64	4 Q	1:56.07	9	Did not advance	
Mitch Larkin	100 m backstroke	53.04	3 Q	52.70	3 Q	52.43	4
Mitch Larkin	200 m backstroke	1:56.01	3 Q	1:54.73	2 Q	1:53.96	2nd place, silver medalist(s)
Travis Mahoney	200 m individual medley	2:00.18	20	Did not advance			
Travis Mahoney	400 m individual medley	4:13.37	7 Q	—N/a		4:15.48	7
Cameron McEvoy	50 m freestyle	21.80	5 Q	21.89	11	Did not advance	
Cameron McEvoy	100 m freestyle	48.12	4 Q	47.93	=3 Q	48.12	7
David McKeon	200 m freestyle	1:48.38	30	Did not advance			
David McKeon	400 m freestyle	3:44.68	5 Q	—N/a		3:45.28	7
Jack McLoughlin	1500 m freestyle	14:56.02	9	—N/a		Did not advance	
David Morgan	100 m butterfly	51.81	=10 Q	51.75	9	Did not advance	
David Morgan	200 m butterfly	1:56.81	19	Did not advance			
Jake Packard	100 m breaststroke	59.26	6 Q	59.48	9	Did not advance	
Joshua Palmer	100 m breaststroke	1:01.13	=30	Did not advance			
Jarrod Poort	10 km open water	—N/a				1:53:40.7	21
Matthew Abood*; Kyle Chalmers; James Magnussen; Cameron McEvoy; James Roberts	4 × 100 m freestyle relay	3:12.65	3 Q	—N/a		3:11.37	3rd place, bronze medalist(s)
Thomas Fraser-Holmes; Jacob Hansford*; Mack Horton; David McKeon; Daniel Smith	4 × 200 m freestyle relay	7:07.98	6 Q	—N/a		7:04.18	4
Kyle Chalmers; Mitch Larkin; Cameron McEvoy*; David Morgan; Jake Packard	4 × 100 m medley relay	3:32.57	=4 Q	—N/a		3:29.93	3rd place, bronze medalist(s)

Women

Athlete	Event	Heat		Semifinal		Final	
Athlete	Event	Time	Rank	Time	Rank	Time	Rank
Jessica Ashwood	400 m freestyle	4:03.58	6 Q	—N/a		4:05.68	7
Jessica Ashwood	800 m freestyle	8:22.57	6 Q	—N/a		8:20.32	5
Bronte Barratt	200 m freestyle	1:56.93	10 Q	1:56.63	8 Q	1:55.25	=5
Georgia Bohl	100 m breaststroke	1:07.96	24	Did not advance			
Georgia Bohl	200 m breaststroke	2:28.24	22	Did not advance			
Bronte Campbell	50 m freestyle	24.45	4 Q	24.43	5 Q	24.42	7
Bronte Campbell	100 m freestyle	53.71	8 Q	53.29	5 Q	53.04	4
Cate Campbell	50 m freestyle	24.52	7 Q	24.32	2 Q	24.15	5
Cate Campbell	100 m freestyle	52.78 OR	1 Q	52.71 OR	1 Q	53.24	6
Tamsin Cook	400 m freestyle	4:04.36	8 Q	—N/a		4:05.30	6
Tamsin Cook	800 m freestyle	8:36.62	20	—N/a		Did not advance	
Alicia Coutts	200 m individual medley	2:10.52	6 Q	2:10.35	6 Q	2:10.88	5
Blair Evans	400 m individual medley	4:38.91	16	—N/a		Did not advance	
Madeline Groves	100 m butterfly	58.17	17	Did not advance			
Madeline Groves	200 m butterfly	2:07.02	5 Q	2:05.66	1 Q	2:04.88	2nd place, silver medalist(s)
Chelsea Gubecka	10 km open water	—N/a				1:58:12.7	15
Belinda Hocking	200 m backstroke	2:08.67	=4 Q	2:07.83	5 Q	2:08.02	5
Emma McKeon	200 m freestyle	1:55.80	2 Q	1:56.29	6 Q	1:54.92	3rd place, bronze medalist(s)
Emma McKeon	100 m butterfly	57.33	9 Q	56.81	2 Q	57.05	6
Taylor McKeown	100 m breaststroke	1:06.73	8	1:07.12	11	Did not advance	
Taylor McKeown	200 m breaststroke	2:23.00	3 Q	2:21.69	1 Q	2:22.43	5
Keryn McMaster	400 m individual medley	4:37.33	=10	—N/a		Did not advance	
Kotuku Ngawati	200 m individual medley	2:13.05	17	Did not advance			
Emily Seebohm	100 m backstroke	58.99	2 Q	59.32	7 Q	59.19	7
Emily Seebohm	200 m backstroke	2:09.00	10 Q	2:09.39	12	Did not advance	
Brianna Throssell	200 m butterfly	2:07.76	10 Q	2:07.19	7 Q	2:07.87	8
Madison Wilson	100 m backstroke	59.92	8 Q	59.03	4 Q	59.23	8
Bronte Campbell; Cate Campbell; Brittany Elmslie; Emma McKeon; Madison Wilson*	4 × 100 m freestyle relay	3:32.39 OR	1 Q	—N/a		3:30.65 WR	1st place, gold medalist(s)
Jessica Ashwood*; Bronte Barratt; Tamsin Cook; Emma McKeon; Leah Neale	4 × 200 m freestyle relay	7:49.24	2 Q	—N/a		7:44.87	2nd place, silver medalist(s)
Cate Campbell; Brittany Elmslie*; Madeline Groves*; Emma McKeon; Taylor McKeown; Emily Seebohm; Madison Wilson*	4 × 100 m medley relay	3:57.80	5 Q	—N/a		3:55.00	2nd place, silver medalist(s)

== Synchronized swimming ==
Australia has fielded a squad of nine synchronized swimmers to compete in the women's duet and team events, by virtue of their top national finish for Oceania at the 2015 FINA World Championships. The full synchronized swimming squad, led by London 2012 Olympian Bianca Hammett, was announced on 9 July 2016.

Athlete	Event	Technical routine		Free routine (preliminary)			Free routine (final)		
Athlete	Event	Points	Rank	Points	Total (technical + free)	Rank	Points	Total (technical + free)	Rank
Nikita Pablo; Rose Stackpole	Duet	73.6360	24	74.7667	148.4027	24	Did not advance		
Hannah Cross; Bianca Hammett; Danielle Kettlewell; Nikita Pablo; Emily Rogers; Cristina Sheehan; Rose Stackpole; Amie Thompson; Deborah Tsai	Team	74.0667	8	—N/a			75.4333	149.5000	8

== Table tennis ==
Australia has fielded a team of four table tennis players (two men and two women) at the Olympics. David Powell and Chris Yan secured the spots in the men's singles, while Olympic veteran Lay Jian Fang and Melissa Tapper, the first Australian to compete at both Olympics and Paralympics, did so in the women's singles, by virtue of their top three finish respectively at the Oceania Qualification Tournament in Bendigo, Victoria.

Hu Heiming and Ziyu Zhang were each awarded the third spot to build the men's and women's teams for the Games as the top Oceania nation in the ITTF Olympic Rankings.

Men

Athlete	Event	Preliminary	Round 1	Round 2	Round 3	Round of 16	Quarterfinals	Semifinals	Final / BM	
Athlete	Event	Opposition Result	Opposition Result	Opposition Result	Opposition Result	Opposition Result	Opposition Result	Opposition Result	Opposition Result	Rank
David Powell	Singles	Aguirre (PAR); L 0–4	Did not advance							
Chris Yan	Singles	Karakašević (SRB); L 2–4	Did not advance							
Hu Heming; David Powell; Chris Yan	Team	—N/a				Hong Kong; L 0–3	Did not advance			

Women

Athlete	Event	Preliminary	Round 1	Round 2	Round 3	Round of 16	Quarterfinals	Semifinals	Final / BM	
Athlete	Event	Opposition Result	Opposition Result	Opposition Result	Opposition Result	Opposition Result	Opposition Result	Opposition Result	Opposition Result	Rank
Lay Jian Fang	Singles	Bye	Dolgikh (RUS); W 4–3	Polcanova (AUT); W 4–1	Yu My (SIN); L 0–4	Did not advance				
Melissa Tapper	Singles	Kumahara (BRA); L 2–4	Did not advance							
Lay Jian Fang; Melissa Tapper; Ziyu Zhang	Team	—N/a				North Korea; L 0–3	Did not advance			

== Taekwondo ==
Australia entered four athletes into the taekwondo competition. Sisters Caroline and 2012 Olympian Carmen Marton, along with the latter's husband Safwan Khalil, and Iranian-born fighter Hayder Shkara secured spots in the women's lightweight (57 kg), women's welterweight (67 kg), men's flyweight (58 kg), and men's welterweight category (80 kg) respectively by virtue of their top finish at the 2016 Oceania Qualification Tournament in Port Moresby.

Athlete	Event	Round of 16	Quarterfinals	Semifinals	Repechage	Final / BM	
Athlete	Event	Opposition Result	Opposition Result	Opposition Result	Opposition Result	Opposition Result	Rank
Safwan Khalil	Men's −58 kg	Ketbi (BEL); W 8–1	Hanprab (THA); L 9–11	Did not advance	Kim T-h (KOR); L 1–4	Did not advance	7
Hayder Shkara	Men's −80 kg	Muhammad (GBR); L 0–14	Did not advance				
Caroline Marton	Women's −57 kg	Glasnović (SWE); L 0–4	Did not advance				
Carmen Marton	Women's −67 kg	Tatar (TUR); L 1–11	Did not advance				

== Tennis ==
Australia named a team of ten tennis players to travel to the Olympics (excluding top players Bernard Tomic and Nick Kyrgios). Rookies John Millman (world no. 66) and Thanasi Kokkinakis (world no. 328) qualified directly for the men's singles, as two of the top 56 eligible players in the ATP World Rankings, while Daria Gavrilova (world no. 51) and her doubles partner and three-time Olympian Samantha Stosur (world no .14) did so for the women's singles based on their WTA World Rankings as of 6 June 2016. Chris Guccione and John Peers were selected to compete in the men's doubles. Following the withdrawal of several tennis players from the Games, Jordan Thompson (world no. 90) and Sam Groth (world no. 115) received spare ITF Olympic places to join Kokkinakis and Millman in the men's singles, as well as the sisters Anastasia and Arina Rodionova in the women's doubles.

Men

Athlete	Event	Round of 64	Round of 32	Round of 16	Quarterfinals	Semifinals	Final / BM	
Athlete	Event	Opposition Score	Opposition Score	Opposition Score	Opposition Score	Opposition Score	Opposition Score	Rank
Sam Groth	Singles	Goffin (BEL); L 4–6, 2–6	Did not advance					
Thanasi Kokkinakis	Singles	Elias (POR); L 6–7^{(4–7)}, 6–7^{(3–7)}	Did not advance					
John Millman	Singles	Berankis (LTU); W 6–0, 6–0	Nishikori (JPN); L 6–7^{(4–7)}, 4–6	Did not advance				
Jordan Thompson	Singles	Edmund (GBR); L 4–6, 2–6	Did not advance					
Chris Guccione; John Peers	Doubles	—N/a	del Potro / González (ARG); L 4–6, 5–7	Did not advance				

Women

Athlete	Event	Round of 64	Round of 32	Round of 16	Quarterfinals	Semifinals	Final / BM	
Athlete	Event	Opposition Score	Opposition Score	Opposition Score	Opposition Score	Opposition Score	Opposition Score	Rank
Daria Gavrilova	Singles	S Williams (USA); L 4–6, 2–6	Did not advance					
Samantha Stosur	Singles	Ostapenko (LAT); W 1–6, 6–3, 6–2	Doi (JPN); W 6–3, 6–4	Kerber (GER); L 0–6, 5–7	Did not advance			
Daria Gavrilova; Samantha Stosur	Doubles	—N/a	Bacsinszky / Hingis (SUI); L 4–6, 6–4, 2–6	Did not advance				
Anastasia Rodionova; Arina Rodionova	Doubles	—N/a	Makarova / Vesnina (RUS); L 1–6, 2–6	Did not advance				

Mixed

Athlete	Event	Round of 16	Quarterfinals	Semifinals	Final / BM	
Athlete	Event	Opposition Score	Opposition Score	Opposition Score	Opposition Score	Rank
Samantha Stosur; John Peers	Doubles	Mirza / Bopanna (IND); L 5–7, 4–6	Did not advance			

== Triathlon ==
Australia has qualified a total of six triathletes for the Olympics. Two-time Olympian Emma Moffatt secured her Olympic spot in the women's triathlon, as a result of her gold medal victory at the 2016 Oceanian Championships in Gisborne, New Zealand, while the men's triathlon spot was awarded to the nation's top finisher Ryan Bailie. The rest of the Australian triathletes (Royle, Fisher, Densham, and Gentle) were ranked among the eligible top 40 in their respective events based on the ITU Olympic Qualification List as of 15 May 2016.

Athlete	Event	Swim (1.5 km)	Trans 1	Bike (40 km)	Trans 2	Run (10 km)	Total Time	Rank
Ryan Bailie	Men's	17:31	0:49	56:11	0:38	31:53	1:47:02	10
Ryan Fisher	Men's	18:01	0:48	55:42	0:38	33:25	1:48:34	24
Aaron Royle	Men's	17:26	0:48	55:05	0:36	32:47	1:46:42	9
Erin Densham	Women's	19:10	0:54	1:01:26	0:39	37:18	1:59:27	12
Ashleigh Gentle	Women's	19:49	0:57	1:03:59	0:41	36:18	2:01:44	26
Emma Moffatt	Women's	19:07	0:58	1:01:24	0:37	35:49	1:57:55	6

== Volleyball ==
=== Beach ===
Two Australia women's beach volleyball teams qualified directly for the Olympics; one by virtue of their nation's top 15 placement in the FIVB Olympic Rankings as of 13 June 2016, and the other by winning the final match over Vanuatu at the AVC Continental Cup in Cairns. These places were awarded to London 2012 Olympian Louise Bawden and her rookie partner Taliqua Clancy, as well as Peruvian-born Mariafe Artacho and Nicole Laird.

Athlete	Event	Preliminary round	Standing	Round of 16	Quarterfinals	Semifinals	Final / BM	
Athlete	Event	Opposition Score	Standing	Opposition Score	Opposition Score	Opposition Score	Opposition Score	Rank
Mariafe Artacho; Nicole Laird	Women's	Pool C Ross – Walsh Jennings (USA); L 0 – 2 (14–21, 13–21); Forrer – Vergé-Dépré (SUI); L 1 – 2 (21–19, 16–21, 19–21); Wang F – Yue Y (CHN); L 0 – 2 (16–21, 10–21)	4	Did not advance				
Louise Bawden; Taliqua Clancy	Women's	Pool F Alfaro – Cope (CRC); W 2 – 0 (21–15, 21–14); Agudo – Pérez (VEN); W 2 – 0 (21–9, 21–14); Meppelink – van Iersel (NED); W 2 – 1 (27–25, 18–21, 16–14)	1 Q	Brzostek – Kołosińska (POL); W 2 – 1 (15–21, 21–16, 15–11)	Ross – Walsh Jennings (USA); L 0 – 2 (14–21, 16–21)	Did not advance		

== Water polo ==
Summary

Key:

- FT – After full time.
- P – Match decided by penalty-shootout.

Team	Event	Group Stage						Quarterfinal	Semifinal	Final / BM	
Team	Event	Opposition Score	Opposition Score	Opposition Score	Opposition Score	Opposition Score	Rank	Opposition Score	Opposition Score	Opposition Score	Rank
Australia men's	Men's tournament	Brazil; L 7–8	Hungary; D 9–9	Japan; W 8–6	Serbia; L 8–10	Greece; W 12–7	5	Did not advance			9
Australia women's	Women's tournament	Russia; W 14–4	Italy; L 7–8	Brazil; W 10–3	—N/a		2	Hungary; L 3–5^{P} FT: 8–8	Brazil; W 11–4	Spain; L 10–12	6

=== Men's tournament ===
Australia men's water polo team was confirmed by the NOC to compete at the Olympic Games through an Oceania continental selection.

Team roster

The following is the Australian roster in the men's water polo tournament of the 2016 Summer Olympics. Nathan Power was originally named, but was replaced by Tyler Martin after injuring his hand during a pre-games training camp in Croatia.

Head coach: (Croatia) Elvis Fatović

№	Name	Pos.	Height	Weight	Date of birth	2016 club
1	Joel Dennerley	GK	1.95 m (6 ft 5 in)	91 kg (201 lb)	25 June 1987	(Australia) UNSW Wests Magpies
2	Richie Campbell	CB	1.93 m (6 ft 4 in)	99 kg (218 lb)	28 September 1987	(Australia) UNSW Wests Magpies
3	George Ford	CB	1.92 m (6 ft 4 in)	95 kg (209 lb)	24 February 1993	(Australia) UWA Torpedoes
4	Johnno Cotterill	D	1.93 m (6 ft 4 in)	88 kg (194 lb)	27 October 1987	(Australia) Sydney University Lions
5	Tyler Martin	CF	2.00 m (6 ft 7 in)	108 kg (238 lb)	13 February 1993	(Australia) UNSW Wests Magpies
6	Jarrod Gilchrist	D	1.89 m (6 ft 2 in)	90 kg (198 lb)	13 June 1990	(Australia) UNSW Wests Magpies
7	Aidan Roach	D	1.87 m (6 ft 2 in)	88 kg (194 lb)	7 September 1990	(Australia) Drummoyne Devils
8	Aaron Younger	D	1.93 m (6 ft 4 in)	100 kg (220 lb)	25 September 1991	(Hungary) Szolnoki Dózsa
9	Joel Swift	D	1.90 m (6 ft 3 in)	103 kg (227 lb)	14 June 1990	(Australia) Fremantle Mariners
10	Joe Kayes	CF	1.98 m (6 ft 6 in)	125 kg (276 lb)	3 January 1991	(Australia) Cronulla Sharks
11	Rhys Howden	D	1.89 m (6 ft 2 in)	84 kg (185 lb)	2 April 1987	(Australia) Brisbane Barracudas
12	Mitchell Emery	D	1.85 m (6 ft 1 in)	89 kg (196 lb)	27 September 1990	(Australia) Drummoyne Devils
13	James Stanton	GK	2.00 m (6 ft 7 in)	93 kg (205 lb)	21 July 1983	(Australia) Victorian Seals

Group play

Pos	Team	Pld	W	D	L	GF	GA	GD	Pts	Qualification
1	Hungary	5	2	3	0	57	43	+14	7	Quarter-finals
2	Greece	5	2	2	1	41	40	+1	6	Quarter-finals
3	Brazil (H)	5	3	0	2	40	39	+1	6	Quarter-finals
4	Serbia	5	2	2	1	49	44	+5	6	Quarter-finals
5	Australia	5	2	1	2	44	40	+4	5	
6	Japan	5	0	0	5	36	61	−25	0	

Source: Rio2016
Rules for classification: 1) Points; 2) Head-to-head points; 3) Head-to-head goal difference; 4) Head-to-head goals scored; 5) Goal difference.
(H) Hosts

6 August 2016; 20:50	Report	Brazil	8–7	Australia	Maria Lenk Aquatic Center, Rio de Janeiro; Referees: Filippo Gomez (ITA), Francesc Buch (ESP)
6 August 2016; 20:50	Report	Score by quarters: 3–2, 2–1, 2–2, 1–2			Maria Lenk Aquatic Center, Rio de Janeiro; Referees: Filippo Gomez (ITA), Francesc Buch (ESP)
6 August 2016; 20:50	Report	Delgado 3	Goals	Campbell, Cotterill 2	Maria Lenk Aquatic Center, Rio de Janeiro; Referees: Filippo Gomez (ITA), Francesc Buch (ESP)

8 August 2016; 13:00	Report	Hungary	9–9	Australia	Maria Lenk Aquatic Center, Rio de Janeiro; Referees: Boris Margeta (SLO), Filippo Gomez (ITA)
8 August 2016; 13:00	Report	Score by quarters: 4–3, 2–2, 1–3, 2–1			Maria Lenk Aquatic Center, Rio de Janeiro; Referees: Boris Margeta (SLO), Filippo Gomez (ITA)
8 August 2016; 13:00	Report	three players 2	Goals	Campbell 4	Maria Lenk Aquatic Center, Rio de Janeiro; Referees: Boris Margeta (SLO), Filippo Gomez (ITA)

10 August 2016; 09:00	Report	Australia	8–6	Japan	Maria Lenk Aquatic Center, Rio de Janeiro; Referees: Francesc Buch (ESP), Joseph Peila (USA)
10 August 2016; 09:00	Report	Score by quarters: 1–2, 2–1, 3–2, 2–1			Maria Lenk Aquatic Center, Rio de Janeiro; Referees: Francesc Buch (ESP), Joseph Peila (USA)
10 August 2016; 09:00	Report	Kayes 4	Goals	Okawa, Takei 2	Maria Lenk Aquatic Center, Rio de Janeiro; Referees: Francesc Buch (ESP), Joseph Peila (USA)

12 August 2016; 22:10	Report	Serbia	10–8	Australia	Maria Lenk Aquatic Center, Rio de Janeiro; Referees: Adrian Alexandrescu (ROU), Francesc Buch (ESP)
12 August 2016; 22:10	Report	Score by quarters: 2–2, 2–3, 2–1, 4–2			Maria Lenk Aquatic Center, Rio de Janeiro; Referees: Adrian Alexandrescu (ROU), Francesc Buch (ESP)
12 August 2016; 22:10	Report	three players 2	Goals	Cotterill 2	Maria Lenk Aquatic Center, Rio de Janeiro; Referees: Adrian Alexandrescu (ROU), Francesc Buch (ESP)

14 August 2016; 14:10	Report	Australia	12–7	Greece	Olympic Aquatics Stadium, Rio de Janeiro; Referees: Filippo Gomez (ITA), Joseph Peila (USA)
14 August 2016; 14:10	Report	Score by quarters: 5–3, 5–1, 0–1, 2–2			Olympic Aquatics Stadium, Rio de Janeiro; Referees: Filippo Gomez (ITA), Joseph Peila (USA)
14 August 2016; 14:10	Report	Cotterill, Howden 3	Goals	Fountoulis 3	Olympic Aquatics Stadium, Rio de Janeiro; Referees: Filippo Gomez (ITA), Joseph Peila (USA)

=== Women's tournament ===
Australia women's water polo team was confirmed by the NOC to compete at the Olympic Games through an Oceania continental selection.

Team roster

The following is the Australian roster in the women's water polo tournament of the 2016 Summer Olympics.

Head coach: Greg McFadden

№	Name	Pos.	Height	Weight	Date of birth	2016 club
1	Lea Yanitsas	GK	1.72 m (5 ft 8 in)	78 kg (172 lb)	15 March 1989	(Australia) Sydney Uni Water Polo Club
2	Gemma Beadsworth	CF	1.80 m (5 ft 11 in)	78 kg (172 lb)	17 July 1987	(Australia) Fremantle Marlins
3	Hannah Buckling	CB	1.77 m (5 ft 10 in)	75 kg (165 lb)	3 June 1992	(Australia) Sydney Uni Water Polo Club
4	Holly Lincoln-Smith	CF	1.83 m (6 ft 0 in)	82 kg (181 lb)	26 March 1988	(Australia) Cronulla Sharks
5	Keesja Gofers	D	1.76 m (5 ft 9 in)	64 kg (141 lb)	16 March 1990	(Australia) Sydney Uni Water Polo Club
6	Bronwen Knox (c)	CF	1.82 m (6 ft 0 in)	88 kg (194 lb)	16 April 1986	(Australia) Victorian Tigers
7	Rowena Webster	CB	1.78 m (5 ft 10 in)	64 kg (141 lb)	27 December 1987	(Australia) Victorian Tigers
8	Glencora Ralph	CB	1.78 m (5 ft 10 in)	68 kg (150 lb)	8 August 1988	(Australia) Fremantle Marlins
9	Zoe Arancini	D	1.70 m (5 ft 7 in)	70 kg (154 lb)	14 July 1991	(Australia) Fremantle Marlins
10	Ashleigh Southern	CF	1.88 m (6 ft 2 in)	82 kg (181 lb)	22 October 1992	(Australia) Brisbane Barracudas
11	Isobel Bishop	D	1.80 m (5 ft 11 in)	69 kg (152 lb)	8 September 1991	(Australia) Sydney Uni Water Polo Club
12	Nicola Zagame	D	1.74 m (5 ft 9 in)	72 kg (159 lb)	11 August 1990	(Australia) Cronulla Sharks
13	Kelsey Wakefield	GK	1.78 m (5 ft 10 in)	64 kg (141 lb)	1 June 1991	(Australia) Queensland Breakers

Group play

Pos	Team	Pld	W	D	L	GF	GA	GD	Pts	Qualification
1	Italy	3	3	0	0	27	15	+12	6	Quarter-finals
2	Australia	3	2	0	1	31	15	+16	4	Quarter-finals
3	Russia	3	1	0	2	23	31	−8	2	Quarter-finals
4	Brazil (H)	3	0	0	3	13	33	−20	0	Quarter-finals

Source: Rio2016
Rules for classification: 1) Points; 2) Head-to-head points; 3) Head-to-head goal difference; 4) Head-to-head goals scored; 5) Goal difference.
(H) Hosts

9 August 2016; 13:00	Report	Russia	4–14	Australia	Maria Lenk Aquatic Center, Rio de Janeiro; Referees: Marie-Claude Deslières (CAN), Adrian Alexandrescu (ROU)
9 August 2016; 13:00	Report	Score by quarters: 0–3, 1–5, 3–2, 0–4			Maria Lenk Aquatic Center, Rio de Janeiro; Referees: Marie-Claude Deslières (CAN), Adrian Alexandrescu (ROU)
9 August 2016; 13:00	Report	Prokofyeva 2	Goals	Southern 4	Maria Lenk Aquatic Center, Rio de Janeiro; Referees: Marie-Claude Deslières (CAN), Adrian Alexandrescu (ROU)

11 August 2016; 10:20	Report	Italy	8–7	Australia	Maria Lenk Aquatic Center, Rio de Janeiro; Referees: Péter Molnár (HUN), Boris Margeta (SLO)
11 August 2016; 10:20	Report	Score by quarters: 4–2, 0–1, 2–3, 2–1			Maria Lenk Aquatic Center, Rio de Janeiro; Referees: Péter Molnár (HUN), Boris Margeta (SLO)
11 August 2016; 10:20	Report	Garibotti 3	Goals	Southern, Webster 2	Maria Lenk Aquatic Center, Rio de Janeiro; Referees: Péter Molnár (HUN), Boris Margeta (SLO)

13 August 2016; 11:40	Report	Australia	10–3	Brazil	Maria Lenk Aquatic Center, Rio de Janeiro; Referees: Dion Willis (RSA), Benjamin Mercier (FRA)
13 August 2016; 11:40	Report	Score by quarters: 1–1, 4–1, 2–0, 3–1			Maria Lenk Aquatic Center, Rio de Janeiro; Referees: Dion Willis (RSA), Benjamin Mercier (FRA)
13 August 2016; 11:40	Report	Gofers, Webster 2	Goals	three players 3	Maria Lenk Aquatic Center, Rio de Janeiro; Referees: Dion Willis (RSA), Benjamin Mercier (FRA)

Quarterfinal

15 August 2016; 15:30	Report	Australia	11–13 (PSO)	Hungary	Olympic Aquatics Stadium, Rio de Janeiro; Referees: Francesc Buch (ESP), Vojin Putniković (SRB)
15 August 2016; 15:30	Report	Score by quarters: 1–3, 2–2, 3–2, 2–1 PSO: 3–5			Olympic Aquatics Stadium, Rio de Janeiro; Referees: Francesc Buch (ESP), Vojin Putniković (SRB)
15 August 2016; 15:30	Report	Southern 3	Goals	Bujka, Keszthelyi 2	Olympic Aquatics Stadium, Rio de Janeiro; Referees: Francesc Buch (ESP), Vojin Putniković (SRB)

Classification semifinal (5–8)

17 August 2016; 11:00	Report	Australia	11–4	Brazil	Olympic Aquatics Stadium, Rio de Janeiro; Referees: Ni Shi Wei (CHN), Marie Deslières (CAN)
17 August 2016; 11:00	Report	Score by quarters: 2–1, 3–1, 4–1, 2–1			Olympic Aquatics Stadium, Rio de Janeiro; Referees: Ni Shi Wei (CHN), Marie Deslières (CAN)
17 August 2016; 11:00	Report	Arancini, Southern 3	Goals	Chiappini 2	Olympic Aquatics Stadium, Rio de Janeiro; Referees: Ni Shi Wei (CHN), Marie Deslières (CAN)

Fifth place match

19 August 2016; 14:10	Report	Australia	10–12	Spain	Olympic Aquatics Stadium, Rio de Janeiro; Referees: Marie-Claude Deslières (CAN), Sergey Naumov (RUS)
19 August 2016; 14:10	Report	Score by quarters: 5–4, 2–3, 1–3, 2–2			Olympic Aquatics Stadium, Rio de Janeiro; Referees: Marie-Claude Deslières (CAN), Sergey Naumov (RUS)
19 August 2016; 14:10	Report	Buckling 3	Goals	Tarragó 7	Olympic Aquatics Stadium, Rio de Janeiro; Referees: Marie-Claude Deslières (CAN), Sergey Naumov (RUS)

== Weightlifting ==
Australia has qualified one male and one female weightlifter for the Rio Olympics by virtue of a top five national finish (for men) and top four (for women), respectively, at the 2016 Oceania Championships. The team must allocate these places to individual athletes by 20 June 2016.

Commonwealth Games runner-up Simplice Ribouem (men's 94 kg) and Tia-Clair Toomey (women's 58 kg) were nominated to the Olympic roster, based on their performances at the Oceanian Championships.

Athlete	Event	Snatch		Clean & Jerk		Total	Rank
Athlete	Event	Result	Rank	Result	Rank	Total	Rank
Simplice Ribouem	Men's −94 kg	155	12	185	13	340	13
Tia-Clair Toomey	Women's −58 kg	82	15	107	13	189	14

== Wrestling ==
Australia has qualified four wrestlers for each of the following weight classes into the Olympic competition, as a result of their semifinal triumphs at the 2016 African & Oceania Qualification Tournament. The entire wrestling squad was announced on 12 April 2016, with Sahit Prizreni remarkably going to his third Olympics after he represented Albania in 2004 and 2008.

On 15 July 2016, the Australian Olympic Committee decided to revoke the license owned by Vinod Kumar Dahiya and his nomination to the Olympic team, following an anti-doping violation.

Key:

- VT – Victory by Fall.
- VB – Victory by injury.
- PP – Decision by Points – the loser with technical points.
- PO – Decision by Points – the loser without technical points.
- ST – Technical superiority – the loser without technical points and a margin of victory of at least 8 (Greco-Roman) or 10 (freestyle) points.

Men's freestyle

Athlete	Event	Qualification	Round of 16	Quarterfinal	Semifinal	Repechage 1	Repechage 2	Final / BM	
Athlete	Event	Opposition Result	Opposition Result	Opposition Result	Opposition Result	Opposition Result	Opposition Result	Opposition Result	Rank
Sahit Prizreni	−65 kg	Katai (CHN); L 1–3 ^{PP}	Did not advance						19
Talgat Ilyasov	−74 kg	Takatani (JPN); L 0–5 ^{VB}	Did not advance						17

Men's Greco-Roman

Athlete	Event	Qualification	Round of 16	Quarterfinal	Semifinal	Repechage 1	Repechage 2	Final / BM	
Athlete	Event	Opposition Result	Opposition Result	Opposition Result	Opposition Result	Opposition Result	Opposition Result	Opposition Result	Rank
Ivan Popov	−130 kg	Bye	Eurén (SWE); L 0–5 ^{VT}	Did not advance					17

== Media coverage ==
The Seven Network won the television rights to broadcast the next three Olympic Games.

== See also ==
- Australia at the 2016 Summer Paralympics
