= Tyler Martin =

Tyler Martin is the name of:

- Tyler Martin (footballer), English footballer for Stoke City
- Tyler Martin (water polo), Australian Water Polo player
