= Alec Potts =

Australian archer (born 1996)

Personal information
- Full name: Alec Potts
- Nickname: Pottsy
- Born: 9 February 1996 (age 30) Clayton, Victoria, Australia
- Height: 185 cm (6 ft 1 in)
- Weight: 77 kg (170 lb)

Sport
- Country: Australia
- Sport: Archery
- Event: Recurve
- Club: AIM Archery
- Coached by: Simon Fairweather
Medal record
Men's archery
Representing Australia
Olympic Games
| Bronze medal – third place | 2016 Rio de Janeiro | Team |
- Updated on 1 April 2018

Alec Potts (born 9 February 1996) is an Australian competitive archer. He won a bronze medal in the men's team recurve at the 2016 Summer Olympics in Rio de Janeiro.

== Biography ==
Born in Clayton, Victoria, Potts took up archery as a child when living with his family in the United Kingdom, and when they returned to Melbourne, joined AIM archery club in Cheltenham. He started an online equipment sales site, Eliza Archery, while still in school.

== Career ==
Potts first competed at the World Archery Youth Championships in 2011, finishing 17th in 2015. At senior level, in the 2015 World Archery Championships he placed 33rd individually and contributed to an 8th-place finish by the Australian team. At his second World Cup, in Shanghai in 2016, he placed 17th individually and 9th in team competition, after qualifying third with the highest Australian international score, 685.

=== 2016 Summer Olympics ===
In May 2016, Potts was selected for the Australian archery squad at the Summer Olympics in Rio de Janeiro, in both individual and team recurve tournaments. He recorded 666 points, 37 perfect tens, and 13 bull's eyes to take the twentieth seed heading to the knockout draw from the classification round, along with his team's cumulative score of 2,005.

In the team competition, he and his compatriots Ryan Tyack and London 2012 Olympian Taylor Worth, in fourth place, beat France 5–3 in the quarter finals, then in the semifinals lost in straight sets (0–6) to tournament favorites South Korea. In the bronze medal match, they held off a late reaction from China (6–2) to secure Australia's first medal at the Rio Olympics and first ever Olympic medal in a team archery event.

In the men's individual recurve, Potts was eliminated 4–6 in the opening round by local archer Bernardo Oliveira.

With eight other Australian athletes, he was held by Rio police on charges of falsifying accreditation to attend Olympics events and released after payment of a fine by the Australian Olympic Committee, which stated that the athletes were not at fault.

=== 2019 Pacific Games ===
Potts placed 2nd in the individual men's recurve competition at the Olympics qualifying event hosted by World Archery in association with the 2019 Pacific Games.
