= David Barnes (archer) =

Australian archer

David Barnes (born 22 February 1986) is an athlete from Adelaide, Australia. He competes in archery. He was an Australian Institute of Sport scholarship holder.

Barnes competed at the 2004 Summer Olympics in men's individual archery. He was defeated in the first round of elimination, placing 36th overall. Barnes was also a member of the 6th-place Australian men's archery team at the 2004 Summer Olympics.

Barnes was part of Australia's men's archery team that qualified for the 2020 Tokyo Olympic Games. His team-mates were Ryan Tyack and Taylor Worth. They competed together in the team event as well against one another in the individual event. In the individual event Barnes fell to Indonesia's Riau Ega Agatha in the first round, In the team event, they lost to the favoured Taiwanese team in the first round.

== Early years ==
Barnes began archery as a nine-year-old. He loved target practice and ended up getting a fibreglass bow. His parents then encouraged him to join a club. In 1999 at the age of 13 he was invited to represent Australia at the 2000 Sydney Olympic Test Event

In 2003 Barnes competed at the Australian Youth Olympic Festival and won two gold medals. At the World Championships he achieved an individual silver and an overall Australian team win. In 2004 Barnes made his Olympic debut as an 18-year-old when he competed at the 2004 Athens Olympic Games.

== Achievements ==
Some of his best achievements are:

- 3rd, Senior World Championships in 2003, New York
- 2nd, Cadet World Championships in 2002, Czech Republic
- 1st, Cadet Teams World Championships in 2002, Czech Republic
- 2nd, European Grand Prix, 2002, Turkey
- 3rd, International Athens tournament, 2003, Athens
- 3rd, European Grand Prix, 2004, Croatia
- 3rd, European Grand Prix, 2004, Turkey
- 1st, IFAA World Field Archery Championships 2006, Australia

Barnes has set many world records along the way including

- 2000 Set 3 Cadet World Records
- 2001 Set 2 Cadet World Records
- 2002 Set 2 Junior, 18 Cadet, and 3 Cadet Team World Records
- 2003 Set 1 Junior world Record
- 2004 Set 1 Junior World Record
