= Johnno Cotterill =

Australian water polo player

Personal information
- Born: 27 October 1987 (age 37); Sutherland, New South Wales, Australia

Sport
- Sport: Water polo

John "Johnno" Cotterill (born 27 October 1987) is an Australian water polo player. At the 2012 Summer Olympics, he competed for the Australia men's national water polo team in the men's event. He is 6 ft. 4 in. tall.
