= Scott Keach =

Australian equestrian (born 1965)

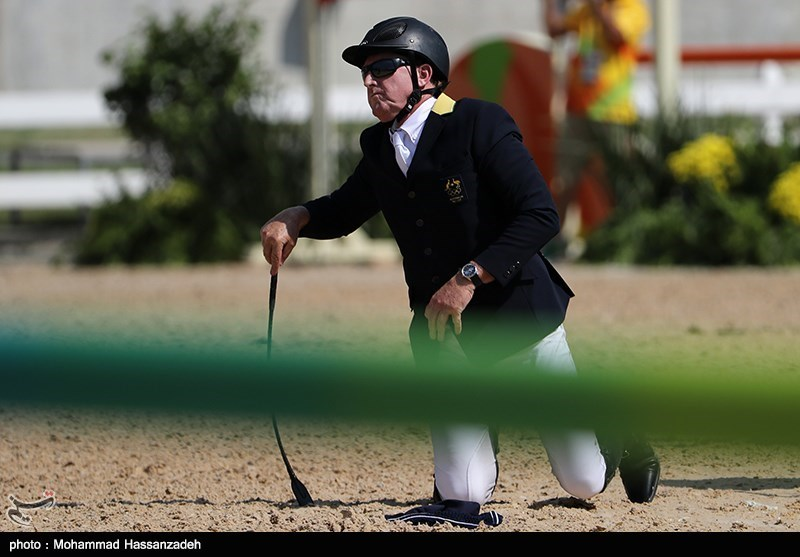

Personal information
- National team: Australia
- Born: 21 April 1965 (age 61)
- Height: 183 cm (6 ft 0 in)
- Weight: 70 kg (154 lb)

Sport
- Country: Australia
- Sport: Equestrian
Medal record
Equestrian
Representing Australia
World Championships
Bronze medal – third place	1986 Gawler	Team eventing

Scott Keach (born 21 April 1965) is an Australian equestrian who competed at the 1988 Summer Olympics in the three-day event. In 2016, he was again named to compete at the Olympics, this time in the show jumping. The 28-year gap between Olympics was a record for Australia.

Originally from Currency Creek in South Australia, Keach now lives in Ocala, Florida.
