= Alicia Lucas =

Australian rugby union player

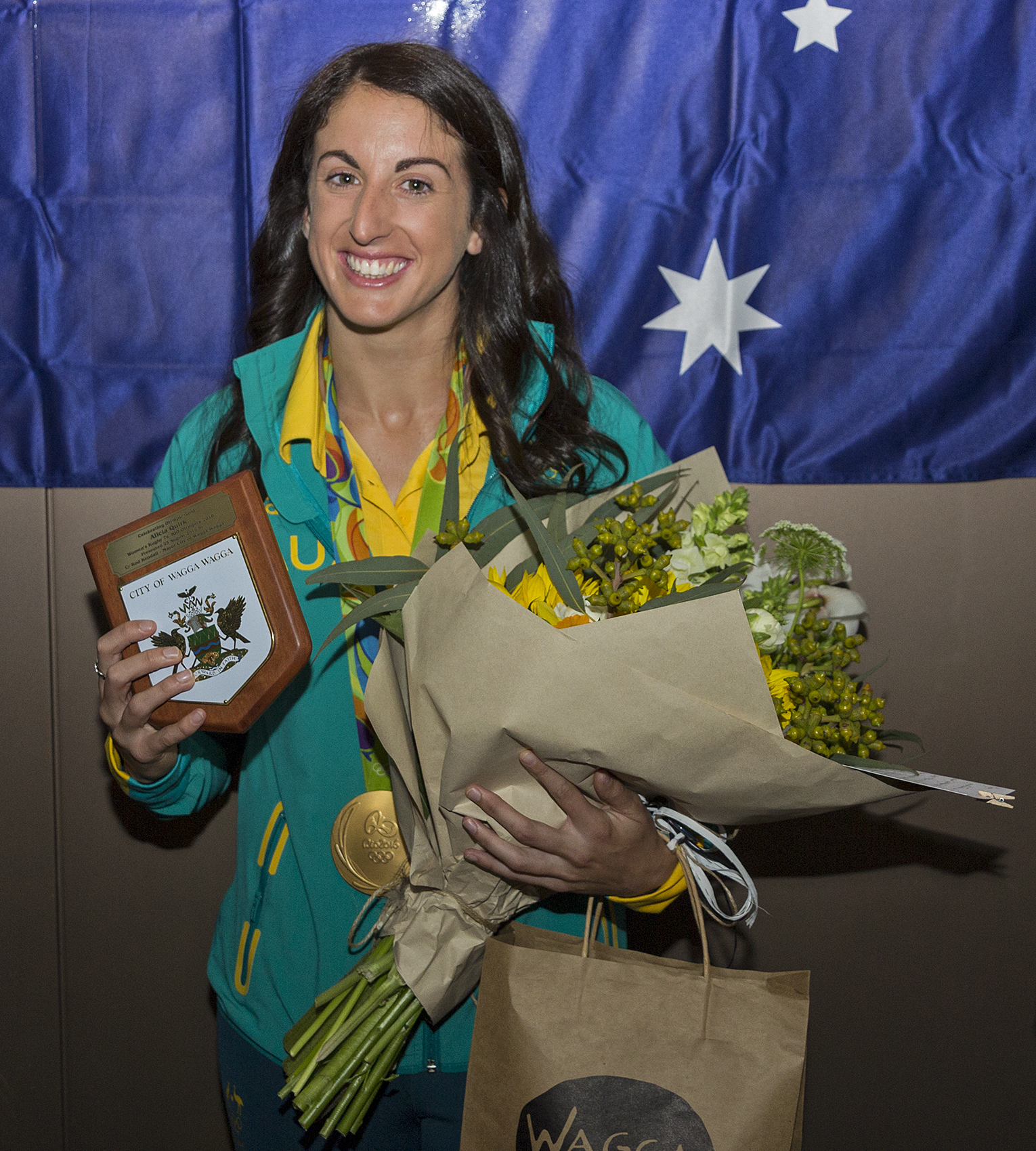
- Alicia Quirk at the homecoming celebration in Wagga Wagga
- Born: 28 March 1992 (age 34)
- Height: 1.72 m (5 ft 8 in)
- Weight: 58.5 kg (129 lb)

Rugby union career
- Position: Back
Amateur team(s)
| Years | Team | Apps | (Points) |
- The Tribe
National sevens team
| Years | Team | | Comps |
| 2013–2022 | Australia | | |
Medal record
Women's rugby sevens
Representing Australia
Olympic Games
| Gold medal – first place | 2016 Rio de Janeiro | Team competition |
Commonwealth Games
| Silver medal – second place | 2018 Gold Coast | Team competition |

Alicia Jane Lucas OAM (née Quirk; born 28 March 1992) is a former professional Australian rugby union player. She represented Australia in international rugby sevens and won a gold medal at the 2016 Summer Olympics in Rio.

== Biography ==
Lucas was born in Wagga Wagga, New South Wales. She played for The Tribe at a club level. Lucas debuted for the Australian sevens team in May 2013. She also represented Australia in Touch Football, and was part of the team which won the 2011 Touch World Cup. She studied for a Bachelor of Physiotherapy at Charles Sturt University, Albury-Wodonga, graduating in 2013. Lucas representative honours also include ACT.

Lucas was a member of Australia's women's sevens team at the 2016 Summer Olympics, defeating New Zealand in the final to win the inaugural Olympic gold medal in the sport.

Lucas announced retired from rugby union and sevens in August 2022.
