= Taylor Worth =

Australian archer (born 1991)

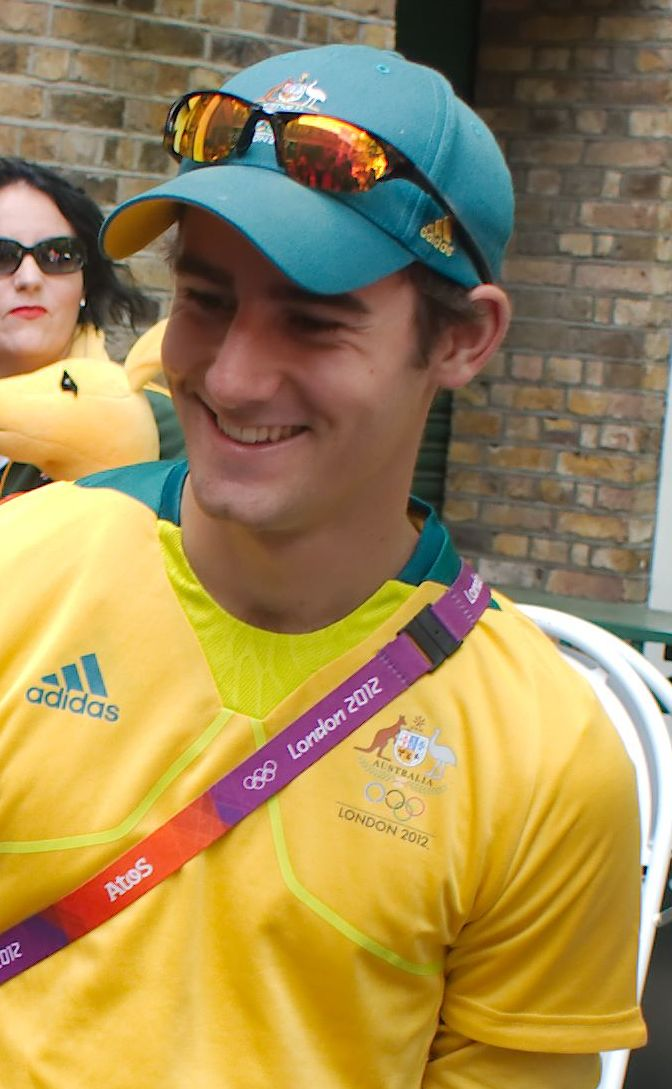

Personal information
- Nationality: Australian
- Born: 8 January 1991 (age 35) Busselton, Western Australia
- Height: 174 cm (5 ft 9 in)
- Weight: 60 kg (132 lb)

Sport
- Country: Australia
- Sport: Archery
- Event: Men's recurve
- Club: Mount Petrie Bowmen
- Coached by: Ya Ping Shih
Medal record
Men's archery
Representing Australia
Olympic Games
Bronze medal – third place	2016 Rio de Janeiro	Team
Commonwealth Games
Gold medal – first place	2010 Delhi	Team
World Youth Archery Championships
Gold medal – first place	2008 Turkey	Under-18 team recurve

Taylor Worth (born 8 January 1991) is an Australian archer competing in recurve events. He won a gold medal at the 2010 Commonwealth Games in the men's team event, a gold medal at the United States Open and at the 2008 World Youth Archery Championships in the under-18 men's team recurve event. Worth represented Australia at the 2012 Summer Olympics in the Men's Individual competition, and at the 2016 Summer Olympics in Rio won a bronze medal alongside Alec Potts and Ryan Tyack in the men's team archery. He represented Australia at the 2020 Summer Olympics.

== Personal ==
Born in Busselton, Western Australia, Worth picked up archery as a 10-year-old when he participated in a school holiday program. He performed very well and became hooked on the sport. He was disappointed when the Australian Institute of Sport cut archery from their elite sport development programs. Aside from archery, Taylor has stated that he enjoys a wide range of other outdoor activities such as paint ball and rock climbing.

== Archery ==
Worth has won several gold medals, including the team men's under-18 recurve event at the 2008 World Youth Archery Championships in Antalya, Turkey. and the United States Open ahead of the 2010 Commonwealth games.

Worth represented Australia at the 2010 Commonwealth Games. He competed in the men's recurve archery team event where he took home a gold medal with a team score of 219, defeating Malaysia who were ranked third in the world at the time and had an event score of 212. He also competed in the individual event on the final day of the competition. At nineteen, he was the youngest Australian archer on the team. At the Games, he was coached by Simon Fairweather.

In September 2011, he was named to the Australian archery shadow Olympic team. He attended a national team training camp in Canberra in September 2011. He attended a national team training camp in Canberra in March 2012. In January 2012, he represented Australia at the 2012 Oceania Olympic qualifying event in New Zealand. At the 2012 National Target Archery Championships, he finished third as a member of AWA. In March at the 2012 Olympic Games Nomination Shoot Results, he finished third with a score of 2611. In May 2012, he participated in a training camp in Buderim. He competed in the 2012 Summer Olympics in which he beat world number one Brady Ellison in the round of 16 before losing in the round of 8.

In 2014 Worth competed in his first World Indoor Championship in Nîmes. He placed 4th, losing to teammate Ryan Tyack in the semi-finals and American rival Brady Ellison in the bronze medal match. However the dominating performance he showed leading up to the semi-finals earned him the nickname, 'The Ten Train'. At the first world cup of the year Taylor made it to his second medal match for the year but lost in a nail-biting five set match against Dutchman Rick Van Der Ven.

Worth was part of Australia's men's archery team that qualified for the 2020 Tokyo Olympic Games. His team-mates were David Barnes and Ryan Tyack. They competed together in the team event as well against one another in the individual event. In the individual event Worth was eliminated by Turkey's Mete Gazoz in the round of 16, In the team event, they lost to the favoured Taiwan team in the first round. Worth and Alice Ingley were nominally selected as Australia's mixed team, but their combined scores in the individually ranking rounds were too low to achieve qualification for the actual event.
