= Tyler Martin (water polo) =

Australian water polo player

Personal information
- Born: 28 June 1990 (age 36) Toronto, Canada
- Height: 191 cm (6 ft 3 in)
- Weight: 92 kg (203 lb)

Sport
- Sport: Water Polo
- Updated on 19 August 2015

Tyler Martin (born 28 June 1990) is a water polo player of Australia. He was part of the Australian team at the 2015 World Aquatics Championships and the 2016 Summer Olympics.

== Business career ==
Tyler Martin started Delfina Sport while fighting for a place on the Rio Olympics team.
