= Ryan Tyack =

Australian archer (born 1991)

Personal information
- Nationality: Australian
- Height: 186 cm (6 ft 1 in)
- Weight: 102 kg (225 lb)

Sport
- Country: Australia
- Sport: Archery
- Event: Men's recurve
- Team: SQAS
- Coached by: Lynette Rankin-Tyack

Achievements and titles
- National finals: 1st (2012)
Medal record
Archery
Representing Australia
Men's recurve archery
Olympic Games
Bronze medal – third place	2016 Rio de Janeiro	Team
World Indoor Championships
Gold medal – first place	2014 Nîmes	Individual
World Field Championships
Silver medal – second place	2024 Lac La Biche	Individual
Silver medal – second place	2024 Lac La Biche	Mixed team
Junior World Outdoor Target Championships
Gold medal – first place	2006 Mexico	Male recurve cadet
World Youth Championships in Athletics
Gold medal – first place	2008 Turkey	Male under-18 team

Ryan Tyack (born 2 June 1991) is an Australian archer competing in men's recurve events at the 2016 Summer Olympics. He earned a gold medal at the 2006 Junior World Outdoor Target Championships in the male recurve cadet event. He also won a gold at the 2008 World Youth Archery Championships in the men's under-18 event. He was named to the Australian archery shadow Olympic squad for the 2012 Summer Olympics, and won the individual competition at the 2014 World Indoor Archery Championships.

== Personal ==
Tyack is from Nambour, Queensland on the Sunshine Coast. From an early age Tyack spent most of his time playing archery or fencing games on his computer. It was his mum, Lynette Rankin-Tyack, that persuaded him to give up the make-believe and enter the real world of archery.

As a nine-year-old in 2000 Tyack started archery and made his junior debut in 2003. He did not have a coach for his first Youth National Championships, so his mum stepped in to repair his equipment and coach him. His mother became his official coach in 2004 and still coaches him today.

== Archery ==
Tyack has earned a number of medals. In 2006, he participated in the Junior World Outdoor Target Championships in the male recurve cadet event in Mérida, Mexico where he took home a gold medal. In 2008, he was part of the Australian team that won a gold in the under-18 event at the World Youth Archery Championships in Antalya, Turkey. In 2009, he was the world junior champion in recurve archery event. As a seventeen-year-old, he competed at the 2009 Australian Youth Olympic Festival where he carried the Australian flag during the opening ceremony. It was the second time he competed at the event. In September 2011, he was named to the Australian archery shadow Olympic team. In December 2011, he set a national record of 685. He attended a national team training camp in Canberra in September 2011.

Tyack competed at the 2012 Oceania Olympic Qualification competition as a twenty-year-old. At the event, he scored a 674 under less than ideal conditions. With the score, he won the men's individual event. He competed at the 2012 World Indoor Championships in Las Vegas in the men's recurve event. In January 2012, he was named the World Archery Athlete of the Week. He attended a national team training camp in Canberra in March 2012. At the 2012 national championships in the team recurve event, he was part of SQAS team. In the team target part, he had a score of 2,612 and in the field part, he had a score of 690. At the 2012 national championships in the all around recurve event, he finished first in the male recurve class. At the 2012 National Target Archery Championships, he finished second as a member of SQAS.

In March at the 2012 Olympic Games Nomination Shoot Results, he finished second with a score of 2,612. In May 2012, he participated in a training camp in Buderim. As of May 2012, he had not qualified for the 2012 Summer Olympics; to make the Games, he needed to qualify at the World Cup event in Ogden, Utah.

He qualified again for the Australian Olympic team for the 2016 Summer Olympics. He has qualified for the 2020 Summer Olympics.

Tyack was part of Australia’s men’s archery team that qualified for the 2020 Tokyo Olympic Games. His team-mates were David Barnes and Taylor Worth. They competed together in the team event as well against one another in the individual event. In the individual event Tyack was eliminated by Turkey's Mete Gazoz in the round of 32, In the team event, they lost to the favoured Taiwan team in the first round.
