= Shooting at the 2019 European Games – Mixed team 10 metre air pistol =

Mixed team 10 metre air pistol at the 2019 European Games
- Venue: Shooting Centre
- Dates: 22 June
- Competitors: 54 from 19 nations

Medalists
gold medal	Vitalina Batsarashkina; Artem Chernousov	Russia
silver medal	Zorana Arunović; Damir Mikec	Serbia
bronze medal	Sandra Reitz; Christian Reitz	Germany

The mixed team 10 metre air pistol event at the 2019 European Games in Minsk, Belarus took place on 22 June at the Shooting Centre.

== Schedule ==
All times are local (UTC+3).

Date	Time	Event
Saturday, 22 June 2019	08:30	Qualification Stage 1
Saturday, 22 June 2019	10:25	Qualification Stage 2
Saturday, 22 June 2019	12:00	Finals

== Results ==
=== Qualification ===
==== Stage 1 ====
Rank	Athlete	Country	Series			Total	Team total	Notes
Rank	Athlete	Country	1	2	3	Total	Team total	Notes
1	Maria Grozdeva	Bulgaria	96	94	95	285-8x	581-23x	Q, GR
1	Samuil Donkov	Bulgaria	100	99	97	296-15x	581-23x	Q, GR
2	Vitalina Batsarashkina	Russia 1	96	94	97	287-10x	580-24x	Q
2	Artem Chernousov	Russia 1	98	97	98	293-14x	580-24x	Q
3	Zorana Arunović	Serbia 2	96	95	94	285-6x	576-16x	Q
3	Damir Mikec	Serbia 2	98	98	95	291-10x	576-16x	Q
4	Sandrine Goberville	France 2	96	96	95	287-10x	575-22x	Q
4	Mathieu Perie	France 2	95	96	97	288-12x	575-22x	Q
5	Viktoria Chaika	Belarus 2	98	98	93	289-7x	574-17x	Q
5	Abdul-Aziz Kurdzi	Belarus 2	95	94	96	285-10x	574-17x	Q
6	Polina Konarieva	Ukraine 1	96	92	95	283-6x	574-13x	Q
6	Pavlo Korostylov	Ukraine 1	96	98	97	291-7x	574-13x	Q
7	Sandra Reitz	Germany 1	96	96	91	283-6x	573-17x	Q
7	Christian Reitz	Germany 1	96	95	99	290-11x	573-17x	Q
8	Nino Salukvadze	Georgia	96	96	96	288-10x	572-16x	Q
8	Tsotne Machavariani	Georgia	95	95	94	284-6x	572-16x	Q
9	Céline Goberville	France 1	95	95	98	288-9x	572-15x	
9	Florian Fouquet	France 1	93	95	96	284-6x	572-15x	
10	Olena Kostevych	Ukraine 2	97	95	95	287-6x	572-12x	
10	Oleh Omelchuk	Ukraine 2	94	96	95	285-6x	572-12x	
11	Agate Rašmane	Latvia	97	93	91	281-6x	570-15x	
11	Lauris Strautmanis	Latvia	98	96	95	289-9x	570-15x	
12	Beata Bartków-Kwiatkowska	Poland 2	93	95	97	285-9x	569-16x	
12	Oskar Miliwek	Poland 2	92	95	97	284-7x	569-16x	
13	Martina Maršálková	Slovakia	94	96	93	283-8x	569-16x	
13	Juraj Tužinský	Slovakia	92	96	98	286-8x	569-16x	
14	Anna Korakaki	Greece	97	97	97	291-10x	568-15x	
14	Dionysios Korakakis	Greece	90	92	95	277-5x	568-15x	
15	Heidi Diethelm Gerber	Switzerland	95	93	97	285-9x	568-12x	
15	Steve Demierre	Switzerland	91	95	97	283-3x	568-12x	
16	Svetlana Medvedeva	Russia 2	94	95	94	283-7x	568-12x	
16	Anton Aristarkhov	Russia 2	97	93	95	285-5x	568-12x	
17	Klaudia Breś	Poland 1	96	96	95	287-6x	567-12x	
17	Szymon Wojtyna	Poland 1	92	96	92	280-6x	567-12x	
18	Bobana Veličković Momčilović	Serbia 1	93	97	95	285-4x	567-7x	
18	Dimitrije Grgić	Serbia 1	91	95	96	282-3x	567-7x	
19	Nigar Nasirova	Azerbaijan	95	89	92	276-5x	566-15x	
19	Ruslan Lunev	Azerbaijan	95	96	99	290-10x	566-15x	
20	Anna Dědová	Czech Republic	93	94	91	278-6x	566-13x	
20	Jindřich Dubový	Czech Republic	98	94	96	288-7x	566-13x	
21	Margherita Brigida Veccaro	Italy 1	91	93	95	279-10x	564-16x	
21	Giuseppe Giordano	Italy 1	95	94	96	285-6x	564-16x	
22	Julia Hochmuth	Germany 2	95	95	92	282-4x	564-11x	
22	Kevin Venta	Germany 2	94	93	95	282-7x	564-11x	
23	Joana Castelão	Portugal	94	92	93	279-4x	564-11x	
23	João Costa	Portugal	96	96	93	285-7x	564-11x	
24	Sylvia Steiner	Austria	96	93	96	285-6x	563-12x	
24	Thomas Havlicek	Austria	90	94	94	278-6x	563-12x	
25	Maria Varricchio	Italy 2	93	93	92	278-6x	563-11x	
25	Paolo Monna	Italy 2	97	95	93	285-5x	563-11x	
26	Katsiaryna Kruchanok	Belarus 1	89	92	92	273-6x	554-10x	
26	Yauheni Zaichyk	Belarus 1	93	94	94	281-4x	554-10x	
27	Henri Rrufa	Albania	91	95	91	277-5x	554-10x	
27	Manuela Delilaj	Albania	93	91	93	277-5x	554-10x	

==== Stage 2 ====
Rank	Athlete	Country	Series		Total	Team total	Notes
Rank	Athlete	Country	1	2	Total	Team total	Notes
1	Vitalina Batsarashkina	Russia 1	94	96	190-4x	389-14x	QG
1	Artem Chernousov	Russia 1	100	99	199-10x	389-14x	QG
2	Zorana Arunović	Serbia 2	99	93	192-4x	385-10x	QG
2	Damir Mikec	Serbia 2	99	94	193-6x	385-10x	QG
3	Sandra Reitz	Germany 1	93	95	188-5x	382-10x	QB
3	Christian Reitz	Germany 1	99	95	194-5x	382-10x	QB
4	Viktoria Chaika	Belarus 2	93	93	186-4x	379-9x	QB
4	Abdul-Aziz Kurdzi	Belarus 2	97	96	193-5x	379-9x	QB
5	Nino Salukvadze	Georgia	92	96	188-4x	377-10x	
5	Tsotne Machavariani	Georgia	94	95	189-6x	377-10x	
6	Polina Konarieva	Ukraine 1	92	94	186-2x	377-9x	
6	Pavlo Korostylov	Ukraine 1	95	96	191-7x	377-9x	
7	Maria Grozdeva	Bulgaria	94	96	190-5x	375-7x	
7	Samuil Donkov	Bulgaria	92	93	185-2x	375-7x	
8	Sandrine Goberville	France 2	93	88	181-3x	373-10x	
8	Mathieu Perie	France 2	95	97	192-7x	373-10x	

=== Finals ===
Rank	Athletes	Country	Result
Gold medal match
1st place, gold medalist(s)	Vitalina Batsarashkina; Artem Chernousov	Russia 1	17
2nd place, silver medalist(s)	Zorana Arunović; Damir Mikec	Serbia 2	9
Bronze medal match
3rd place, bronze medalist(s)	Sandra Reitz; Christian Reitz	Germany 1	16
4	Viktoria Chaika; Abdul-Aziz Kurdzi	Belarus 2	8
