= Shooting at the 2019 European Games – Mixed team 25 metre standard pistol =

Mixed team 25 metre standard pistol at the 2019 European Games
- Venue: Shooting Centre
- Dates: 28 June
- Competitors: 34 from 11 nations

Medalists
gold medal	Doreen Vennekamp; Oliver Geis	Germany
silver medal	Monika Karsch; Christian Reitz	Germany
bronze medal	Olena Kostevych; Pavlo Korostylov	Ukraine

The mixed team 25 meter standard pistol event at the 2019 European Games in Minsk, Belarus took place on 28 June at the Shooting Centre.

== Schedule ==
All times are local (UTC+3).

Date	Time	Event
Friday, 28 June 2019	13:00	Qualification
Friday, 28 June 2019	15:00	Semifinal
Friday, 28 June 2019	17:30	Final

== Results ==
=== Qualification ===
Rank	Athlete	Country	Series			Total	Team total	Notes
Rank	Athlete	Country	1	2	3	Total	Team total	Notes
1	Monika Karsch	Germany 1	97	90	89	276-6x	566-11x	Q, GR
1	Christian Reitz	Germany 1	99	97	94	290-5x	566-11x	Q, GR
2	Doreen Vennekamp	Germany 2	97	93	92	282-7x	564-14x	Q
2	Oliver Geis	Germany 2	93	93	96	282-7x	564-14x	Q
3	Klaudia Breś	Poland 2	97	86	91	274-5x	555-12x	Q
3	Piotr Daniluk	Poland 2	95	96	90	281-7x	555-12x	Q
4	Anna Dědová	Czech Republic	94	94	90	278-6x	554-12x	Q
4	Martin Strnad	Czech Republic	93	92	91	276-6x	554-12x	Q
5	Maria Grozdeva	Bulgaria 1	96	94	89	279-5x	554-10x	Q
5	Samuil Donkov	Bulgaria 1	93	90	92	275-5x	554-10x	Q
6	Olena Kostevych	Ukraine 1	91	93	87	271-1x	550-7x	Q
6	Pavlo Korostylov	Ukraine 1	93	96	90	279-6x	550-7x	Q
7	Sylvia Steiner	Austria	95	93	92	280-3x	549-9x	Q
7	Thomas Havlicek	Austria	91	87	91	269-6x	549-9x	Q
8	Svetlana Medvedeva	Russia 2	95	91	91	277-4x	549-7x	Q
8	Nikita Sukhanov	Russia 2	93	90	89	272-3x	549-7x	Q
9	Antoaneta Boneva	Bulgaria 2	94	95	88	277-7x	548-13x	
9	Stoyan Pushkov	Bulgaria 2	88	92	91	271-6x	548-13x	
10	Oksana Kovalchuk	Ukraine 2	94	93	92	279-5x	545-10x	
10	Oleksandr Petriv	Ukraine 2	95	84	87	266-5x	545-10x	
11	Margarita Lomova	Russia 1	96	91	82	269-4x	545-9x	
11	Artem Chernousov	Russia 1	95	93	88	276-5x	545-9x	
12	Joanna Tomala	Poland 1	94	83	92	269-3x	541-7x	
12	Oskar Miliwek	Poland 1	94	91	87	272-4x	541-7x	
13	Joana Castelão	Portugal	92	91	79	262-4x	539-11x	
13	João Costa	Portugal	95	92	90	277-7x	539-11x	
14	Nigar Nasirova	Azerbaijan	89	93	79	261-3x	537-13x	
14	Ruslan Lunev	Azerbaijan	95	93	88	276-10x	537-13x	
15	Agate Rašmane	Latvia	96	83	87	266-5x	537-7x	
15	Lauris Strautmanis	Latvia	94	93	84	271-2x	537-7x	
16	Viktoria Chaika	Belarus 1	93	90	85	268-1x	535-5x	
16	Abdul-Aziz Kurdzi	Belarus 1	95	83	89	267-4x	535-5x	
17	Katsiaryna Kruchanok	Belarus 2	93	84	75	252-1x	522-4x	
17	Yauheni Zaichyk	Belarus 2	94	92	84	270-3x	522-4x	
	Anna Korakaki	Greece					DNS	
	Dionysios Korakakis	Greece					DNS	

=== Semifinal ===
Athlete	Country	Total	Notes
Monika Karsch; Christian Reitz	Germany 1	384.3	QF
Svetlana Medvedeva; Nikita Sukhanov	Russia 2	379.5	
Doreen Vennekamp; Oliver Geis	Germany 2	385.6	QF
Sylvia Steiner; Thomas Havlicek	Austria	376.6	
Klaudia Breś; Piotr Daniluk	Poland 2	384.3	
Olena Kostevych; Pavlo Korostylov	Ukraine 1	384.7	QF
Anna Dědová; Martin Strnad	Czech Republic	383.6	QF
Maria Grozdeva; Samuil Donkov	Bulgaria 1	382.9	

=== Final ===
Rank	Athlete	Country	Series		
Rank	Athlete	Country	1	2	3
1st place, gold medalist(s)	Doreen Vennekamp; Oliver Geis	Germany 2	193.7	187.6	199.5
2nd place, silver medalist(s)	Monika Karsch; Christian Reitz	Germany 1	195.1	192.7	192.5
3rd place, bronze medalist(s)	Olena Kostevych; Pavlo Korostylov	Ukraine 1	180.0	187.3	
4	Anna Dědová; Martin Strnad	Czech Republic	177.2		
