= Shooting at the 2019 European Games – Women's 10 metre air pistol =

Women's 10 metre air pistol at the 2019 European Games
- Venue: Shooting Centre
- Dates: 23 June
- Competitors: 37 from 24 nations

Medalists
gold medal	Zorana Arunović	Serbia
silver medal	Anna Korakaki	Greece
bronze medal	Antoaneta Boneva	Bulgaria

The women's 10 metre air pistol event at the 2019 European Games in Minsk, Belarus took place on 23 June at the Shooting Centre.

== Schedule ==
All times are FET (UTC+03:00)

Date	Time	Event
Sunday, 23 June 2019	11:15	Qualification
Sunday, 23 June 2019	13:30	Final

== Records ==
Prior to this competition, the existing world, European and Games records were as follows.

Qualification
World Record	Anna Korakaki (GRE)	587	Fort Benning, United States	12 May 2018
European Record	Anna Korakaki (GRE)	587	Fort Benning, United States	12 May 2018
Games Record	ISSF Rule changed on 01.01.2018	—	—	—
Final
World Record	Zorana Arunović (SRB)	246.9	Maribor, Slovenia	11 March 2017
European Record	Zorana Arunović (SRB)	246.9	Maribor, Slovenia	11 March 2017
Games Record	ISSF Rule changed on 01.01.2018	—	—	—

== Results ==
=== Qualification ===
The qualification round took place on 23 June to determine the competitors for the finals.

Rank	Athlete	Country	1	2	3	4	5	6	Total	Xs	Notes
1	Klaudia Breś	Poland	95	97	93	98	99	96	578	21	Q, GR
2	Zorana Arunović	Serbia	98	95	98	97	96	94	578	21	Q, GR
3	Sylvia Steiner	Austria	95	99	98	96	94	96	578	17	Q, GR
4	Vitalina Batsarashkina	Russia	97	93	97	95	97	97	576	16	Q
5	Katsiaryna Kruchanok	Belarus	98	97	100	94	92	94	575	17	Q
6	Antoaneta Boneva	Bulgaria	96	96	93	97	96	96	574	13	Q
7	Olena Kostevych	Ukraine	92	94	98	94	97	98	573	12	Q
8	Anna Korakaki	Greece	90	96	96	95	98	97	572	19	Q
9	Sandrine Goberville	France	95	96	97	93	95	96	572	15	
10	Bobana Veličković Momčilović	Serbia	94	94	96	97	98	93	572	13	
11	Svetlana Medvedeva	Russia	95	95	95	93	98	95	571	17	
12	Maria Grozdeva	Bulgaria	96	94	98	96	94	93	571	17	
13	Viktoria Chaika	Belarus	95	96	97	94	96	93	571	14	
14	Céline Goberville	France	96	95	92	95	98	95	571	12	
15	Nigar Nasirova	Azerbaijan	97	93	95	95	92	98	570	16	
16	Heidi Diethelm Gerber	Switzerland	90	96	95	94	97	98	570	15	
17	Julia Hochmuth	Germany	96	95	96	97	92	93	569	14	
18	Joana Castelão	Portugal	96	94	98	97	93	91	569	14	
19	Beata Bartków-Kwiatkowska	Poland	94	93	96	93	96	97	569	12	
20	Viktória Egri	Hungary	91	95	97	93	96	97	569	10	
21	Polina Konarieva	Ukraine	95	95	94	95	95	94	568	10	
22	Sandra Reitz	Germany	95	92	94	95	93	98	567	16	
23	Veronika Major	Hungary	94	95	92	93	97	96	567	16	
24	Margherita Brigida Veccaro	Italy	93	95	94	93	96	96	567	11	
25	Sonia Franquet	Spain	94	94	92	95	94	95	564	12	
26	Nino Salukvadze	Georgia	94	92	94	93	95	94	562	11	
27	Anna Dědová	Czech Republic	92	94	91	94	93	96	560	12	
28	Manuela Delilaj	Albania	96	88	90	95	95	94	558	16	
29	Nino Khutsiberidze	Georgia	89	95	94	97	89	93	557	12	
30	Agate Rašmane	Latvia	92	90	93	95	92	94	556	13	
31	Maria Varricchio	Italy	92	93	91	92	93	95	556	10	
32	Martina Maršálková	Slovakia	86	97	93	93	94	90	553	12	
33	Dimitra Papakanellou	Greece	90	94	92	94	91	91	552	7	
34	Jelena Pantović	Montenegro	89	93	93	94	88	93	550	5	
35	Gabrielė Rankelytė	Lithuania	92	89	95	91	88	94	549	11	
36	Jekaterina Ždanova	Lithuania	90	92	90	92	88	92	544	9	
37	Roxana Bonte	Romania	90	89	90	92	93	89	543	6	

=== Final ===
The final round also took place on 23 June to determine the final classification.

Rank	Athlete	Series									S-off	Notes
Rank	Athlete	1	2	3	4	5	6	7	8	9	S-off	Notes
1st place, gold medalist(s)	Zorana Arunović (SRB)	49.2	99.3	120.4	140.3	159.4	180.3	200.2	220.6	241.2		GR
2nd place, silver medalist(s)	Anna Korakaki (GRE)	49.4	100.8	119.1	139.5	160.2	180.0	199.4	219.1	238.9		
3rd place, bronze medalist(s)	Antoaneta Boneva (BUL)	51.1	99.1	118.9	138.7	158.7	177.9	198.1	218.1			
4	Vitalina Batsarashkina (RUS)	50.3	99.1	119.0	138.5	158.2	177.6	198.0				
5	Olena Kostevych (UKR)	47.0	96.8	116.8	136.1	156.6	176.6					
6	Klaudia Breś (POL)	46.0	94.6	114.9	136.1	155.5						
7	Sylvia Steiner (AUT)	47.1	96.9	116.6	135.3							
8	Katsiaryna Kruchanok (BLR)	46.1	93.2	112.2								
