= Russia at the 2019 European Games =

- IOC code: RUS
- NOC: Russian Olympic Committee
- Website: www.olympic.ru

in Minsk, Belarus 21–30 June
- Competitors: 218 in 15 sports
- Flag bearers: Artem Osipenko (opening); Sergey Kamenskiy (closing)
- Medals Ranked 1st: Gold 44 Silver 24 Bronze 41 Total 109

European Games appearances (overview)
- 2015; 2019; 2023; 2027

Russia competed at the 2019 European Games, in Minsk, Belarus from 21 to 30 June 2019. Russia had previously competed at the 2015 European Games in Baku, Azerbaijan, where it won 164 medals, including 79 golds. A total of 218 sportsmen competed in 15 sports.

== Medalists ==
Medal	Name	Sport	Event	Date
Gold	Vitalina Batsarashkina; Artem Chernousov	Shooting	Mixed team 10 m air pistol	22 June
Gold	Yulia Karimova; Sergey Kamenskiy	Shooting	Mixed team 10 m air rifle	22 June
Gold	Victoria Aksenova; Kirill Startsev	Gymnastics	Mixed pairs Dynamic	22 June
Gold	Elena Bondareva	Sambo	Women's 48 kg	22 June
Gold	Dina Averina	Gymnastics	Women's rhythmic individual all-around	22 June
Gold	Tatiana Kazeniuk	Sambo	Women's 56 kg	22 June
Gold	Andrey Perepelyuk	Sambo	Men's 82 kg	22 June
Gold	Ekaterina Onoprienko	Sambo	Women's 64 kg	22 June
Gold	Daria Mezhetskaia	Judo	Women's 57 kg	22 June
Gold	Artem Chernousov	Shooting	Men's 10 m air pistol	23 June
Gold	Dina Averina	Gymnastics	Women's rhythmic individual hoop	23 June
Gold	Natalia Avdeeva; Anton Bulaev	Archery	Mixed team compound	23 June
Gold	Dina Averina	Gymnastics	Women's rhythmic individual ribbon	23 June
Gold	Vera Biryukova; Anastasia Maksimova; Anastasia Shishmakova; Anzhelika Stubailo; Maria Tolkacheva	Gymnastics	Women's rhythmic group 5 balls	23 June
Gold	Diana Ryabova	Sambo	Women's 52 kg	23 June
Gold	Victoria Aksenova; Kirill Startsev	Gymnastics	Mixed pairs All-round	23 June
Gold	Ruslan Bagdasarian	Sambo	Men's 62 kg	23 June
Gold	Sergey Ryabov	Sambo	Men's 90 kg	23 June
Gold	Yelena Sokolova	Athletics	Women's long jump	23 June
Gold	Margarita Lomova; Artem Chernousov	Shooting	Mixed team 50 m pistol	24 June
Gold	Arman Adamian	Judo	Men's 100 kg	24 June
Gold	Ilia Karpenkov; Kirill Pisklov; Stanislav Sharov; Alexey Zherdev	Basketball	Men's tournament	24 June
Gold	Aleksandra Babintseva; Ksenia Chibisova; Daria Davydova; Khusen Khalmurzaev; Alan Khubetsov; Anastasiia Konkina; Daria Mezhetskaia; Musa Mogushkov; Alena Prokopenko; Inal Tasoev; Denis Yartsev; Kazbek Zankishiev	Judo	Mixed team	25 June
Gold	Garsevan Dzhanazian; Timur Kulaev; Ilia Ostapenko; Petr Perminov; Roman Semenov	Gymnastics	Mixed aerobic group	25 June
Gold	Sergey Kamenskiy	Shooting	Men's 50 m rifle three positions	26 June
Gold	Zaurbek Sidakov	Wrestling	Men's freestyle 74 kg	26 June
Gold	Dauren Kurugliev	Wrestling	Men's freestyle 86 kg	26 June
Gold	Anzor Khizriev	Wrestling	Men's freestyle 125 kg	26 June
Gold	Artem Kuzakhmetov; Aleksandr Sergeyev; Oleg Gusev; Vitaly Ershov	Canoe sprint	Men's K-4 500 m	27 June
Gold	Yulia Zykova	Shooting	Women's 50 m rifle three positions	27 June
Gold	Abdulrashid Sadulaev	Wrestling	Men's freestyle 97 kg	27 June
Gold	Ekaterina Rogovaia; Daria Shmeleva; Anastasia Voynova	Cycling	Women's team sprint	27 June
Gold	Nikita Bersenev; Lev Gonov; Ivan Smirnov; Gleb Syritsa	Cycling	Men's team pursuit	28 June
Gold	Angelina Melnikova	Gymnastics	Women's artistic individual all-around	29 June
Gold	David Belyavskiy	Gymnastics	Men's artistic individual all-around	29 June
Gold	Ivan Smirnov	Cycling	Men's individual pursuit	29 June
Gold	Stepan Maryanyan	Wrestling	Men's Greco-Roman 60 kg	29 June
Gold	Zaur Kabaloev	Wrestling	Men's Greco-Roman 67 kg	29 June
Gold	Aleksandr Chekhirkin	Wrestling	Men's Greco-Roman 77 kg	29 June
Gold	David Belyavskiy	Gymnastics	Men's pommel horse	30 June
Gold	Muslim Gadzhimagomedov	Boxing	Men's 91 kg	30 June
Gold	Angelina Melnikova	Gymnastics	Women's uneven bars	30 June
Gold	Anastasia Voynova	Cycling	Women's sprint	30 June
Gold	Daria Shmeleva	Cycling	Women's 500 m time trial	30 June
Silver	Anastasiia Galashina; Vladimir Maslennikov	Shooting	Mixed team 10 m air rifle	22 June
Silver	Irina Dolgova	Judo	Women's 48 kg	22 June
Silver	Natalia Kuziutina	Judo	Women's 52 kg	22 June
Silver	Sayan Khertek	Sambo	Men's 57 kg	22 June
Silver	Victoria Aksenova; Kirill Startsev	Gymnastics	Mixed pairs Balance	22 June
Silver	Dina Averina	Gymnastics	Women's rhythmic individual clubs	23 June
Silver	Stanislav Skryabin	Sambo	Men's 74 kg	23 June
Silver	Zhanara Kusanova	Sambo	Men's 80 kg	23 June
Silver	Yekaterina Starygina	Athletics	Women's javelin throw	23 June
Silver	Ilya Ivanyuk	Athletics	Men's high jump	23 June
Silver	Sergey Kamenskiy	Shooting	Men's 10 m air rifle	24 June
Silver	Inal Tasoev	Judo	Men's +100 kg	24 June
Silver	Mikhail Melnik	Gymnastics	Men's trampoline	25 June
Silver	Kirill Shamshurin	Canoe sprint	Men's C-1 1000 m	26 June
Silver	Natalia Avdeeva	Archery	Women's individual compound	26 June
Silver	Anastasia Bratchikova	Wrestling	Women's freestyle 68 kg	27 June
Silver	Gabil Mamedov	Boxing	Men's 60 kg	29 June
Silver	Khariton Agrba	Boxing	Men's 69 kg	29 June
Silver	Evgenia Augustinas	Cycling	Women's omnium	29 June
Silver	Svetlana Soluianova	Boxing	Women's 51 kg	30 June
Silver	Angelina Melnikova	Gymnastics	Women's vault	30 June
Silver	Dmitriy Lankin	Gymnastics	Men's vault	30 June
Silver	Angelina Melnikova	Gymnastics	Women's balance beam	30 June
Silver	Sergey Semenov	Wrestling	Men's Greco-Roman 130 kg	30 June
Bronze	Nikita Kletskov	Sambo	Men's 68 kg	22 June
Bronze	Alsim Chernoskulov	Sambo	Men's 100 kg	22 June
Bronze	Galina Ambartsumian	Sambo	Women's 72 kg	22 June
Bronze	Anna Balashova	Sambo	Women's +80 kg	22 June
Bronze	Dina Averina	Gymnastics	Women's rhythmic individual ball	23 June
Bronze	Andrei Kubarkov	Sambo	Men's 52 kg	23 June
Bronze	Yana Kostenko	Sambo	Women's 60 kg	23 June
Bronze	Marina Mokhnatkina	Sambo	Women's 68 kg	23 June
Bronze	Artem Osipenko	Sambo	Men's +100 kg	23 June
Bronze	Vera Biryukova; Anastasia Maksimova; Anastasia Shishmakova; Anzhelika Stubailo; Maria Tolkacheva	Gymnastics	Women's rhythmic group all-around	23 June
Bronze	Daria Semianova; Aleksey Alipov	Shooting	Mixed team trap	24 June
Bronze	Khusen Khalmurzaev	Judo	Men's 90 kg	24 June
Bronze	Ksenia Chibisova	Judo	Women's +78 kg	24 June
Bronze	Tatyana Konakova; Grigorii Shikhaleev	Gymnastics	Mixed aerobic pairs	24 June
Bronze	Polina Khorosheva; Kirill Grigoryan	Shooting	Mixed team 50 m rifle prone	25 June
Bronze	Irina Kundius; Yana Pavlova	Gymnastics	Women's trampoline synchronized	25 June
Bronze	Anastasia Panchenko; Kira Stepanova	Canoe sprint	Women's K-2 500 m	26 June
Bronze	Roman Anoshkin; Vladislav Litovka	Canoe sprint	Men's K-2 1000 m	26 June
Bronze	Ilya Pervukhin; Kirill Shamshurin	Canoe sprint	Men's C-2 1000 m	26 June
Bronze	Zaur Uguev	Wrestling	Men's freestyle 57 kg	26 June
Bronze	Kseniia Kurach; Olesia Romasenko	Canoe sprint	Women's C-2 500 m	27 June
Bronze	Polina Khorosheva	Shooting	Women's 50 m rifle three positions	27 June
Bronze	Akhmed Chakaev	Wrestling	Men's freestyle 65 kg	27 June
Bronze	Stalvira Orshush	Wrestling	Women's freestyle 53 kg	27 June
Bronze	Daria Abramova	Boxing	Women's 57 kg	28 June
Bronze	Anastasia Belyakova	Boxing	Women's 60 kg	28 June
Bronze	Maria Kuznetsova	Wrestling	Women's freestyle 62 kg	28 June
Bronze	Darima Sandakova	Boxing	Women's 75 kg	28 June
Bronze	Ekaterina Bolotova; Alina Davletova	Badminton	Women's doubles	28 June
Bronze	Daria Shmeleva	Cycling	Women's keirin	28 June
Bronze	Vladimir Ivanov; Ivan Sozonov	Badminton	Men's doubles	28 June
Bronze	Dmitrii Mukhomediarov	Cycling	Men's points race	28 June
Bronze	Evgeniya Kosetskaya	Badminton	Women's singles	29 June
Bronze	Vladislav Polyashov	Gymnastics	Men's artistic individual all-around	29 June
Bronze	Denis Dmitriev	Cycling	Men's sprint	29 June
Bronze	Tamara Dronova	Cycling	Women's individual pursuit	30 June
Bronze	Aleksandr Golovin	Wrestling	Men's Greco-Roman 97 kg	30 June
Bronze	Diana Klimova; Maria Novolodskaya	Cycling	Women's madison	30 June
Bronze	Denis Dmitriev	Cycling	Men's keirin	30 June
Bronze	Daria Shmeleva	Cycling	Women's sprint	30 June
Bronze	Evgeny Plakhutin	Karate	Men's kumite 60 kg	30 June

Medals by sport
Sport	1st place, gold medalist(s)	2nd place, silver medalist(s)	3rd place, bronze medalist(s)	Total
Gymnastics	11	6	5	22
Sambo	7	3	8	18
Wrestling	7	2	5	14
Shooting	6	2	3	11
Cycling	5	1	7	13
Judo	3	3	2	8
Boxing	1	3	3	7
Athletics	1	2	0	3
Canoe sprint	1	1	4	6
Archery	1	1	0	2
Basketball	1	0	0	1
Badminton	0	0	3	3
Karate	0	0	1	1
Total	44	24	41	109

Medals by date
Day	Date	1st place, gold medalist(s)	2nd place, silver medalist(s)	3rd place, bronze medalist(s)	Total
Day 1	22 June	9	5	4	18
Day 2	23 June	10	5	6	21
Day 3	24 June	3	2	4	9
Day 4	25 June	2	1	2	5
Day 5	26 June	4	2	4	10
Day 6	27 June	4	1	4	9
Day 7	28 June	1	0	8	9
Day 8	29 June	6	3	3	12
Day 9	30 June	5	5	6	16
Total		44	24	41	109

== Competitors ==
Sport	Men	Women	Total
Archery	4	4	8
Athletics	8	8	16
Badminton	4	4	8
Basketball	4	4	8
Beach soccer	12	–	12
Boxing	10	5	15
Canoe sprint	11	8	19
Cycling	15	13	28
Gymnastics	12	13	25
Judo	9	9	18
Karate	1	0	1
Sambo	9	9	18
Shooting	10	10	20
Table tennis	2	3	5
Wrestling	12	5	17
Total	123	95	218

== Archery ==
Recurve

Athlete	Event	Ranking round		Round of 64	Round of 32	Round of 16	Quarterfinals	Semifinals	Final / BM	
Athlete	Event	Score	Seed	Opposition Score	Opposition Score	Opposition Score	Opposition Score	Opposition Score	Opposition Score	Rank
Arsalan Baldanov	Men's individual	647	27	Liahusheu (BLR); L 2–6	Did not advance					
Galsan Bazarzhapov	Men's individual	665	13	Bye	Galiazzo (ITA); W 6–4	Nespoli (ITA); L 2–6	Did not advance			
Vitaly Popov	Men's individual	637	37	Rieger (GER); L 2–6	Did not advance					
Anna Balsukova	Women's individual	649	7	Bye	Putkaradze (GEO); W 6–0	Kuoppa (FIN); W 6–0	Degn (DEN); W 7–1	Boari (ITA); L 0–6	Bayardo (NED); L 1–7	4
Ksenia Perova	Women's individual	662	2	Bye	Degn (DEN); L 5–6	Did not advance				
Inna Stepanova	Women's individual	652	4	Bye	Reidy (IRL); W 6–0	Jager (DEN); W 6–5	Andreoli (ITA); L 4–6	Did not advance		
Arsalan Baldanov; Galsan Bazarzhapov; Vitalii Popov	Men's team	1949	6	—N/a			Spain; L 2–6	Did not advance		6
Anna Balsukova; Ksenia Perova; Inna Stepanova	Women's team	1963	1	—N/a			Denmark; L 4–5	Did not advance		5
Ksenia Perova; Galsan Bazarzhapov	Mixed team	1327	5	—N/a	Bye	Bjerendal / Fink (SWE); W 5–1	Boari / Nespoli (ITA); L 4–5	Did not advance		5

Compound

Athlete	Event	Ranking round		Round of 16	Quarterfinals	Semifinals	Final / BM	
Athlete	Event	Score	Seed	Opposition Score	Opposition Score	Opposition Score	Opposition Score	Rank
Anton Bulaev	Men's individual	702	4	Przybylski (POL); W 143–142	Seywert (LUX); L 143–144	Did not advance		
Natalia Avdeeva	Women's individual	698	2	Kokkinou Georgiadou (CYP); W 142–137	De Laat (NED); W 147–143	Dodemont (FRA); W 147–144	Ellison (SLO); L 144 (8)–144 (10)	2nd place, silver medalist(s)
Natalia Avdeeva; Anton Bulaev	Mixed team	1400	1	Bye	Meißner / Trachsel (GER); W 154–143	Bostan / Çağıran (TUR); W 152–145	De Laat / Schloesser (NED); W 152 (18)– 152 (17)	1st place, gold medalist(s)

== Athletics ==
Track events

Athlete	Event	Result	Rank
Jennifer Akiniymika	Women's 100 m	11.74	9
Dmitriy Lopin	Men's 100 m	10.61	8
Artyom Makarenko	Men's 110 m hurdles	13.88	6
Mariya Pavlova	Women's 100 m hurdles	13.89	14
Timofey Chalyy; Vyacheslav Kolesnichenko; Polina Miller; Vera Rudakova	Mixed 4 × 400 m relay	3:21.02	6
Valeriya Andreyeva; Yevgeniy Kunts; Alyona Mamina; Yegor Nikolayev	Mixed distance pursuit relay	4:36.66	16

Field events

Athlete	Event	Distance	Rank
Ilya Ivanyuk	Men's high jump	2.26	2nd place, silver medalist(s)
Yelena Sokolova	Women's long jump	6.76	1st place, gold medalist(s)
Yekaterina Starygina	Women's javelin throw	63.57	2nd place, silver medalist(s)

Team event

Athlete	Event	Qualification				Quarterfinals				Semifinals				Final			
Athlete	Event	Result	Points	Total points	Rank	Result	Points	Total points	Rank	Result	Points	Total points	Rank	Result	Points	Total points	Rank
Dmitriy Lopin	Men's 100 m	10.61	12	83	1 QS	Bye				10.43	10	48	6	Did not advance			
Yelena Sokolova (Q); Mariya Pavlova (SF)	Women's long jump	6.76*	12	83	1 QS	Bye				6.07*	7	48	6	Did not advance			
Jennifer Akiniymika	Women's 100 m	11.74	10	83	1 QS	Bye				11.72	6	48	6	Did not advance			
Yekaterina Starygina (Q); Mariya Pavlova (SF)	Women's javelin throw	63.57*	12	83	1 QS	Bye				32.12*	2	48	6	Did not advance			
Timofey Chalyy (Q); Vyacheslav Kolesnichenko; Polina Miller; Vera Rudakova; Ilya Shkurenyov (SF)	Mixed 4 × 400 m relay	3:21.02	10	83	1 QS	Bye				3:21.59	4	48	6	Did not advance			
Artyom Makarenko	Men's 110 m hurdles	13.88	10	83	1 QS	Bye				13.71	10	48	6	Did not advance			
Ilya Ivanyuk	Men's high jump	2.26*	11	83	1 QS	Bye				2.02*	7	48	6	Did not advance			
Mariya Pavlova	Women's 100 m hurdles	13.89	6	83	1 QS	Bye				13.91	2	48	6	Did not advance			
Valeriya Andreyeva; Timofey Chalyy (SF); Yevgeniy Kunts; Alyona Mamina; Yegor Nikolayev (Q)	Mixed distance pursuit relay	4:36.66 (4:36.66)	—N/a		1 QS	Bye				4:37.15 (4:28.80)	—N/a		6	Did not advance			

== Badminton ==
Athletes	Event	Group stage				Round of 16	Quarterfinals	Semifinals	Final	Rank
Athletes	Event	Opposition Score	Opposition Score	Opposition Score	Rank	Opposition Score	Opposition Score	Opposition Score	Opposition Score	Rank
Vladimir Malkov	Men's singles	Mann (LUX); W (21–17, 21–14)	Filimon (ROU); W (21–8, 21–13)	Qowimuramadhohi (AZE); W (21–7, 21–11)	1 Q	Heino (FIN); W (21–14, 21–14)	Leverdez (FRA); L (13–21, 10–21)	Did not advance		
Evgeniya Kosetskaya	Women's singles	Tan (BEL); W (21–15, 21–11)	Christodoulou (CYP); W (21–7, 21–9)	Zaitsava (BLR); W (21–11, 21–10)	1 Q	Pavlinić (CRO); W (21–7, 21–11)	Li (GER); W (21–10, 21–13)	Blichfeldt (DEN); L (14–21, 11–21)	Did not advance	3rd place, bronze medalist(s)
Vladimir Ivanov; Ivan Sozonov	Men's doubles	Kaisti / Larkimo (FIN); W (21–9, 21–11)	Flåten Jørgensen / Mork (NOR); W (21–8, 21–9)	Janáček / Švejda (CZE); W (21–7, 21–8)	1 Q	—N/a	Vlaar / Yanakiev (BUL); W (21–15, 21–18)	Astrup / Skaarup (DEN); L (17–21, 17–21)	Did not advance	3rd place, bronze medalist(s)
Ekaterina Bolotova; Alina Davletova	Women's doubles	Karlsson / Magnusson (SWE); W (21–15, 17–21, 21–18)	Garino / Iversen (ITA); W (21–9, 21–12)	Iluinskaya / Zharka (UKR); W (21–12, 21–14)	1 Q	—N/a	Marran / Rüütel (EST); W (21–14, 21–15)	Piek / Seinen (NED); L (21–18, 20–22, 14–21)	Did not advance	3rd place, bronze medalist(s)
Evgenij Dremin; Evgenia Dimova	Mixed doubles	S. Magee / C. Magee (IRL); L (21–16, 19–21, 15–21)	Konakh / Silich (BLR); W (21–8, 21–14)	Gicquel / Delrue (FRA); L (21–19, 11–21, 19–21)	3	—N/a	Did not advance			

== Basketball 3x3 ==
Team roster

Men

- Ilia Karpenkov
- Kirill Pisklov
- Stanislav Sharov
- Alexey Zherdev

Women

- Yulia Kozik
- Ekaterina Polyashova
- Anna Pozdnyakova
- Anastasiia Shuvagina

Summary

Team	Event	Group stage				Quarterfinals	Semifinals	Final / BM	
Team	Event	Opposition Score	Opposition Score	Opposition Score	Rank	Opposition Score	Opposition Score	Opposition Score	Rank
Russia men's	Men's tournament	Italy; W 22–15	France; L 21–22	Ukraine; W 21–14	1 Q	Czech Republic; W 20–15	Poland; W 17–13	Latvia; W 21–14	1st place, gold medalist(s)
Russia women's	Women's tournament	Serbia; W 15–9	Belarus; L 16–21	Italy; W 21–2	2 Q	France; L 13–20	Did not advance		

== Beach soccer ==
Team roster

- Maksim Chuzhkov
- Yuri Krasheninnikov
- Nikolai Kryshanov
- Viktor Kryshanov
- Aleksey Makarov
- Ivan Ostrovskii
- Artur Paporotnyi
- Vladimir Raskin
- Kirill Romanov
- Dmitry Shishin
- Anton Shkarin
- Fedor Zemskov

Summary

Team	Group stage				Semifinals / Pl	Final / BM / Pl	
Team	Opposition Score	Opposition Score	Opposition Score	Rank	Opposition Score	Opposition Score	Rank
Russia men's	Spain; L 4–5 (a.e.t.)	Italy; L 2–4	Ukraine; W 5–1	4	Belarus; W 5–5 (a.e.t.); 3–2 (p)	Italy; L 3–4	6

== Boxing ==
Men

Athlete	Event	Round of 64	Round of 32	Round of 16	Quarterfinals	Semifinals	Final	
Athlete	Event	Opposition Result	Opposition Result	Opposition Result	Opposition Result	Opposition Result	Opposition Result	Rank
Bator Sagaluev	49 kg	—N/a		Daly (IRL); L 0–5	Did not advance			
Vadim Kudryakov	52 kg	—N/a	Bye	Escobar (ESP); L 1–4	Did not advance			
Bakhtovar Nazirov	56 kg	—N/a	Bye	Gomtsyan (GEO); L 0–5	Did not advance			
Gabil Mamedov	60 kg	—N/a	Bye	Skurdelis (LTU); W 5–0	Shadalov (GER); W 5–0	Eranosyan (GEO); W 5–0	Asanau (BLR); L 1–4	2nd place, silver medalist(s)
Aleksei Mazur	64 kg	—N/a	Diallo (BEL); W 5–0	Oumiha (FRA); L 1–4	Did not advance			
Khariton Agrba	69 kg	Bye	Merkulovs (LAT); W 5–0	Madiev (GEO); W 5–0	Belous (MDA); W 5–0	Barabanov (UKR); W 5–0	McCormack (GBR); L 0–5	2nd place, silver medalist(s)
Gleb Bakshi	75 kg	Bye	Kokkinos (CYP); W 5–0	Bartl (CZE); W 5–0	Khyzhniak (UKR); L 1–4	Did not advance		
Imam Khataev	81 kg	—N/a	Arădoaie (ROU); W 5–0	Fiori (ITA); L 0–3	Did not advance			
Muslim Gadzhimagomedov	91 kg	—N/a	Bye	Schelstraete (BEL); W 5–0	Mouhiidine (ITA); W 5–0	Filipi (CRO); W 5–0	Smiahlikau (BLR); W 5–0	1st place, gold medalist(s)
Ivan Veriasov	+91 kg	—N/a	Ghadfa (ESP); W 5–0	Vykhryst (UKR); L 0–5	Did not advance			

Women

Athlete	Event	Round of 16	Quarterfinals	Semifinals	Final	
Athlete	Event	Opposition Result	Opposition Result	Opposition Result	Opposition Result	Rank
Svetlana Soluianova	51 kg	Bye	Nechita (ROU); W 5–0	Dimitrova (BUL); W 4–1	Çakıroğlu (TUR); L 1–4	2nd place, silver medalist(s)
Daria Abramova	57 kg	Bye	Bruyevich (BLR); W 3–2	Walsh (IRL); L 2–3	Did not advance	3rd place, bronze medalist(s)
Anastasia Belyakova	60 kg	Bye	Frostholm (DEN); W 5–0	Potkonen (FIN); L 0–4	Did not advance	3rd place, bronze medalist(s)
Yaroslava Yakushina	69 kg	Bye	Koszewska (POL); L 1–4	Did not advance		
Darima Sandakova	75 kg	Martín (ESP); W 5–0	Borutsa (UKR); W 5–0	Price (GBR); L 0–5	Did not advance	3rd place, bronze medalist(s)

== Canoe sprint ==
Men

Athlete	Event	Heats		Semifinal		Final	
Athlete	Event	Time	Rank	Time	Rank	Time	Rank
Ivan Shtyl	C-1 200 m	40.360	2 QF	Bye		45.623	5
Kirill Shamshurin	C-1 1000 m	3:49.784	4 QS	3:48.374	1 FA	3:58.028	2nd place, silver medalist(s)
Ilya Pervukhin; Kirill Shamshurin	C-2 1000 m	3:32.889	2 QF	Bye		3:42.547	3rd place, bronze medalist(s)
Evgenii Lukantsov	K-1 200 m	35.146	3 QS	34.733	1 FA	39.606	6
Maxim Spesivtsev	K-1 1000 m	3:33.393	2 QS	3:25.865	1 FA	3:35.978	6
Maxim Spesivtsev	K-1 5000 m	—N/a				22:56.813	11
Roman Anoshkin; Vladislav Litovka	K-2 1000 m	3:08.251	3 QF	Bye		3:19.023	3rd place, bronze medalist(s)
Vitaly Ershov; Oleg Gusev; Artem Kuzakhmetov; Aleksandr Sergeyev	K-4 500 m	1:19.756	3 QF	Bye		1:32:376	1st place, gold medalist(s)

Women

Athlete	Event	Heats		Semifinal		Final	
Athlete	Event	Time	Rank	Time	Rank	Time	Rank
Olesia Romasenko	C-1 200 m	46.866	1 QF	Bye		51.806	5
Kseniia Kurach; Olesia Romasenko	C-2 500 m	1:56.355	1 QF	Bye		2:14.194	3rd place, bronze medalist(s)
Natalia Podolskaya	K-1 200 m	42.338	3 QS	40.371	3 FA	44.163	9
Svetlana Chernigovskaya	K-1 500 m	1:49.412	3 QS	1:50.068	1 FA	2:10.644	9
Kira Stepanova	K-1 5000 m	—N/a				26:06.856	8
Anastasia Panchenko; Kira Stepanova	K-2 200 m	39.368	3 QF	Bye		46.296	7
Anastasia Panchenko; Kira Stepanova	K-2 500 m	1:41.386	3 QF	Bye		1:43.358	3rd place, bronze medalist(s)
Kristina Kovnir; Anastasia Panchenko; Vera Sobetova; Kira Stepanova	K-4 500 m	1:31.339	3 QF	Bye		1:44.756	6

== Cycling ==
=== Road ===
Men

Athlete	Event	Time	Rank
Stepan Kurianov	Road race	4:22:27	109
Artem Nych	Road race	4:10:58	62
Artem Nych	Time trial	35:07.44	12
Alexander Porsev	Road race	4:10:58	37
Evgeny Shalunov	Road race	4:16:52	98
Anton Vorobyev	Road race	4:12:00	77
Anton Vorobyev	Time trial	34:35.32	7

Women

Athlete	Event	Time	Rank
Polina Kirillova	Road race	3:08:43	43
Diana Klimova	Road race	3:08:24	21
Daria Malkova	Road race	Did not finish	
Maria Novolodskaya	Road race	3:08:43	48
Maria Novolodskaya	Time trial	39:10.73	13
Elizaveta Oshurkova	Road race	3:08:24	19
Elizaveta Oshurkova	Time trial	39:47.59	14

=== Track ===
Sprint

Athlete	Event	Qualification		1/32 finals	1/32 finals repechage	1/16 finals	1/16 finals repechage	1/8 finals	1/8 finals repechage	Quarterfinals	Semifinals	Final / BM	
Athlete	Event	Time	Rank	Opposition	Opposition	Opposition	Opposition	Opposition	Opposition	Opposition	Opposition	Opposition	Rank
Denis Dmitriev	Men's sprint	9.770	3 q	Chebanets (UKR); W	Bye	Kelemen (CZE); W	Bye	Sarnecki (POL); W	Bye	Carlin (GBR); W, W	Hoogland (NED); L, L	Rudyk (POL); W, W	3rd place, bronze medalist(s)
Pavel Yakushevskiy	Men's sprint	9.836	7 q	Ceci (ITA); W	Bye	Caleyron (FRA); L	Zaitsau (BLR); W	Rudyk (POL); L	Baugé (FRA); Čechman (CZE); 3rd	Did not advance			
Daria Shmeleva	Women's sprint	10.851	4 q	Miadzvetskaya (BLR); W	Bye	Sibiak (POL); W	Bye	Marchant (GBR); W	Bye	Krupeckaitė (LTU); W, W	Gros (FRA); L, W, L	Braspennincx (NED); L, W, W	3rd place, bronze medalist(s)
Anastasia Voynova	Women's sprint	10.816	3 q	Casas (ESP); W	Bye	Vece (ITA); W	Bye	Clair (FRA); W	Bye	Van Riessen (NED); W, W	Braspennincx (NED); W, W	Gros (FRA); W, W	1st place, gold medalist(s)

Team sprint

Athlete	Event	Qualification		First round		Final / BM	
Athlete	Event	Time	Rank	Opposition Time	Rank	Opposition Time	Rank
Ekaterina Rogovaia (Q); Daria Shmeleva (1R, F); Anastasia Voynova	Women's team sprint	33.196	1	Italy; W 32.367	1 Q	Lithuania; W 32.317	1st place, gold medalist(s)
Denis Dmitriev; Shane Perkins (Q); Alexander Sharapov (1R); Pavel Yakushevskiy	Men's team sprint	43.944	5 Q	Czech Republic; L 43.634	5	Did not advance	

Team pursuit

Athlete	Event	Qualification		First round		Final / BM	
Athlete	Event	Time	Rank	Opponent Time	Rank	Opponent Time	Rank
Nikita Bersenev; Lev Gonov; Ivan Smirnov; Gleb Syritsa	Men's team pursuit	3:55.201	1	Switzerland; W 3:53.104	1 Q	Italy; W OVL	1st place, gold medalist(s)
Evgenia Augustinas; Gulnaz Badykova; Tamara Dronova; Diana Klimova	Women's team pursuit	4:34.492	7	– 4:41.719	7	Did not advance	

Keirin

Athlete	Event	First round	Repechage	Second round	Final
Athlete	Event	Rank	Rank	Rank	Rank
Denis Dmitriev	Men's keirin	1 Q	Bye	2 Q	3rd place, bronze medalist(s)
Alexander Dubchenko	Men's keirin	6	2	Did not advance	
Ekaterina Gnidenko	Women's keirin	4	2	Did not advance	
Daria Shmeleva	Women's keirin	2 Q	Bye	3 Q	3rd place, bronze medalist(s)

Omnium

Athlete	Event	Scratch race		Tempo race		Elimination race		Points race		Total points	Rank
Athlete	Event	Rank	Points	Rank	Points	Rank	Points	Rank	Points	Total points	Rank
Gleb Syritsa	Men's omnium	Did not start									
Evgenia Augustinas	Women's omnium	7	28	4	34	5	32	4	29	123	2nd place, silver medalist(s)

Madison

Athlete	Event	Points	Rank
Gleb Syritsa; Lev Gonov	Men's madison	9	10
Diana Klimova; Maria Novolodskaya	Women's madison	39	3rd place, bronze medalist(s)

Time trial

Athlete	Event	Qualification		Final	
Athlete	Event	Time	Rank	Time	Rank
Alexander Sharapov	Men's 1 km time trial	1:01.682	7 Q	1:02.528	8
Natalia Antonova	Women's 500 m time trial	34.065	2 Q	34.185	4
Daria Shmeleva	Women's 500 m time trial	33.395	1 Q	33.209	1st place, gold medalist(s)

Individual pursuit

Athlete	Event	Qualification		Final / BM	
Athlete	Event	Time	Rank	Opponent Time	Rank
Ivan Smirnov	Men's individual pursuit	4:15.119	1 Q	Plebani (ITA); W 4:14.675	1st place, gold medalist(s)
Tamara Dronova	Women's individual pursuit	3:34.840	3 q	Knight (GBR); W 3:34.371	3rd place, bronze medalist(s)

Endurance

Athlete	Event	Points	Rank
Dmitrii Mukhomediarov	Men's points race	25	3rd place, bronze medalist(s)
Dmitrii Mukhomediarov	Men's scratch	—N/a	9
Gulnaz Badykova	Women's points race	6	10
Diana Klimova	Women's scratch	—N/a	14

== Gymnastics ==
=== Acrobatic ===
Mixed

Athlete	Event	Score	Rank
Victoria Aksenova; Kirill Startsev	Balance	29.230	2nd place, silver medalist(s)
Victoria Aksenova; Kirill Startsev	Dynamic	29.060	1st place, gold medalist(s)
Victoria Aksenova; Kirill Startsev	All-around	29.580	1st place, gold medalist(s)

=== Aerobic ===
Mixed

Athletes	Event	Score	Rank
Garsevan Dzhanazian; Timur Kulaev; Ilia Ostapenko; Petr Perminov; Roman Semenov	Mixed groups	22.250	1st place, gold medalist(s)
Tatyana Konakova; Grigorii Shikhaleev	Mixed pairs	21.300	3rd place, bronze medalist(s)

=== Artistic ===
Men

Athlete	Event	Apparatus						Total	Rank
Athlete	Event	F	PH	R	V	PB	HB	Total	Rank
David Belyavskiy	Qualification	14.266	14.633 Q	14.100	14.100	15.200 Q	14.200 Q	86.499	1 Q
David Belyavskiy	All-around	13.300	14.233	13.933	14.533	15.433	14.033	85.465	1st place, gold medalist(s)
David Belyavskiy	Pommel horse	—N/a	15.033	—N/a				15.033	1st place, gold medalist(s)
David Belyavskiy	Parallel bars	—N/a				14.733	—N/a	14.733	4
David Belyavskiy	Horizontal bar	—N/a					13.466	13.466	5
Dmitriy Lankin	Qualification	14.366 Q	11.500	14.366 Q	14.933 Q	13.633	10.600	79.398	8
Dmitriy Lankin	Floor	14.133	—N/a					14.133	4
Dmitriy Lankin	Rings	—N/a		14.366	—N/a			14.366	6
Dmitriy Lankin	Vault	—N/a			14.733	—N/a		14.733	2nd place, silver medalist(s)
Vladislav Polyashov	Qualification	13.966	13.333	13.233	13.000	15.133	13.766	82.431	2 Q
Vladislav Polyashov	All-around	14.366	13.266	13.433	14.233	15.133	14.033	84.464	3rd place, bronze medalist(s)

Women

Athlete	Event	Apparatus				Total	Rank
Athlete	Event	V	UB	BB	F	Total	Rank
Angelina Melnikova	Qualification	14.233 Q	14.100 R	13.133 Q	12.800	54.266	1 Q
Angelina Melnikova	All-around	14.266	13.966	13.100	13.166	54.498	1st place, gold medalist(s)
Angelina Melnikova	Vault	14.133	—N/a			14.133	2nd place, silver medalist(s)
Angelina Melnikova	Uneven bars	—N/a	14.466	—N/a		14.466	1st place, gold medalist(s)
Angelina Melnikova	Balance beam	—N/a		13.600	—N/a	13.600	2nd place, silver medalist(s)
Anastasia Ilyankova	Qualification	–	14.300 Q	–	–	14.300	31
Anastasia Ilyankova	Uneven bars	—N/a	DNS	—N/a		Did not start	
Aleksandra Shchekoldina	Qualification	14.333	13.433	11.466	12.333	51.565	8 Q
Aleksandra Shchekoldina	All-around	14.166	13.333	11.733	13.133	52.365	5

=== Rhythmic ===
Individual

Athlete	Event	Final & Qualification					
Athlete	Event	Hoop	Ball	Clubs	Ribbon	Total	Rank
Dina Averina	All-around	21.300 Q	23.600 Q	22.800 Q	20.050 Q	87.750	1st place, gold medalist(s)
Dina Averina	Hoop	22.850	—N/a			22.850	1st place, gold medalist(s)
Dina Averina	Ball	—N/a	21.300	—N/a		21.300	3rd place, bronze medalist(s)
Dina Averina	Clubs	—N/a		22.600	—N/a	22.600	2nd place, silver medalist(s)
Dina Averina	Ribbon	—N/a			21.350	21.350	1st place, gold medalist(s)

Group

Athlete	Event	Total	Rank
Vera Biryukova; Anastasia Maksimova; Anastasia Shishmakova; Anzhelika Stubailo; Maria Tolkacheva	5 balls	27.300	1st place, gold medalist(s)
Vera Biryukova; Anastasia Maksimova; Anastasia Shishmakova; Anzhelika Stubailo; Maria Tolkacheva	3 hoops, 4 clubs	24.400	5
Vera Biryukova; Anastasia Maksimova; Anastasia Shishmakova; Anzhelika Stubailo; Maria Tolkacheva	All-round	51.700	3rd place, bronze medalist(s)

=== Trampoline ===
Athlete	Event	Qualification		Final	
Athlete	Event	Total	Rank	Score	Rank
Mikhail Melnik	Men's individual	110.635	3 Q	59.435	2nd place, silver medalist(s)
Andrey Yudin	Men's individual	82.260	19	Did not advance	
Mikhail Melnik; Andrey Yudin	Men's synchronized	—N/a		5.860	7
Irina Kundius	Women's individual	62.235	19	Did not advance	
Yana Pavlova	Women's individual	104.900	1 Q	11.430	6
Irina Kundius; Yana Pavlova	Women's synchronized	—N/a		48.140	3rd place, bronze medalist(s)

== Judo ==
Men

Athlete	Event	Round of 64	Round of 32	Round of 16	Quarterfinals	Semifinals	Repechage	Final / BM	
Athlete	Event	Opposition Result	Opposition Result	Opposition Result	Opposition Result	Opposition Result	Opposition Result	Opposition Result	Rank
Albert Oguzov	−60 kg	—N/a	Bye	Plafky (GER); L 0–1s2	Did not advance				
Iakub Shamilov	−66 kg	Bye	Van Gansbeke (BEL); L 0–10s2	Did not advance					
Musa Mogushkov	−73 kg	Bye	Kanivets (UKR); W 1s1–0s2	Karapetian (ARM); L 0–10	Did not advance				
Denis Yartsev	−73 kg	Bye	Chaine (FRA); W 10s1–0	Gardašević (MNE); W 1s1–0s1	Shavdatuashvili (GEO); L 0s1–1s2	Did not advance	Butbul (ISR); L 0s2–10s1	Did not advance	
Alan Khubetsov	−81 kg	Bye	Esposito (ITA); L 0s1–1s1	Did not advance					
Khusen Khalmurzaev	−90 kg	Bye	Bottieau (BEL); W 10s2–0h	Gviniashvili (GEO); W 1s1–0s1	Grossklaus (SUI); W 10s2–0h	Özerler (TUR); L 0s2–10s1	Bye	Chamberlain (GBR); W 10s1–0s1	3rd place, bronze medalist(s)
Arman Adamian	−100 kg	—N/a	Madsen (DEN); W 1–0s1	Fonseca (POR); W 10s1–0	Nikiforov (BEL); W 10–0	Kumrić (CRO); W 10–1s1	Bye	Liparteliani (GEO); W 10–0	1st place, gold medalist(s)
Kazbek Zankishiev	−100 kg	—N/a	Bauža (LTU); W 10s1–0s2	Maret (FRA); L 0s1–1s1	Did not advance				
Inal Tasoev	+100 kg	—N/a	Bye	Tsiarpitski (BLR); W 11s2–0s2	Krpálek (CZE); W 1s2–0	Kokauri (AZE); W 11s2–0s1	Bye	Tushishvili (GEO); L 1s1–10	2nd place, silver medalist(s)

Women

Athlete	Event	Round of 32	Round of 16	Quarterfinals	Semifinals	Repechage	Final / BM	
Athlete	Event	Opposition Result	Opposition Result	Opposition Result	Opposition Result	Opposition Result	Opposition Result	Rank
Irina Dolgova	−48 kg	Bye	Milani (ITA); W 10–0s1	M. Štangar (SLO); W 10s1–0s2	Costa (POR); W 1s1–0	Bye	Bilodid (UKR); L 0–1s1	2nd place, silver medalist(s)
Natalia Kuziutina	−52 kg	Bye	A. Štangar (SLO); W 11–0	Giuffrida (ITA); W 1s1–0s1	Perenc (POL); W 11s1–0s1	Bye	Kelmendi (KOS); L 1s1–0s2	2nd place, silver medalist(s)
Anastasiia Konkina	−57 kg	Starke (GER); L 0–11	Did not advance					
Daria Mezhetskaia	−57 kg	Kowalczyk (POL); W 10s1–0s1	Liparteliani (GEO); W 10s1–0	Verhagen (NED); W 10–0	Coban (GER); W 10–0s1	Bye	Gjakova (KOS); W 1s1–0s1	1st place, gold medalist(s)
Daria Davydova	−63 kg	Bye	Obradović (SRB); W 10–0s1	Vermeer (NED); L 0–10	Did not advance	Tałach (POL); L 0s2–10s2	Did not advance	
Alena Prokopenko	−70 kg	Van Dijke (NED); L 0s1–10	Did not advance					
Aleksandra Babintseva	−78 kg	Sampaio (POR); W 11–1	Verkerk (NED); L 1–11s2	Did not advance				
Antonina Shmeleva	−78 kg	Salánki (HUN); W 10–1	Powell (GBR); L 0h–10s1	Did not advance				
Ksenia Chibisova	+78 kg	Bye	Velenšek (SLO); W 10–0x	Slutskaya (BLR); L 0–10	Did not advance	Adlington (GBR); W 10–0s1	Nunes (POR); W 10–0h	3rd place, bronze medalist(s)

Mixed team

Athlete	Event	Round of 16	Quarterfinals	Semifinals	Repechage	Final / BM	
Athlete	Event	Opposition Result	Opposition Result	Opposition Result	Opposition Result	Opposition Result	Rank
Aleksandra Babintseva; Ksenia Chibisova; Daria Davydova; Khusen Khalmurzaev; Alan Khubetsov; Anastasiia Konkina; Daria Mezhetskaia; Musa Mogushkov; Alena Prokopenko; Inal Tasoev; Denis Yartsev; Kazbek Zankishiev	Mixed team	Turkey; W 4–0	Serbia; W 4–0	Belarus; W 4–2	Bye	Portugal; W 4–3	1st place, gold medalist(s)

== Karate ==
Kumite
Men

Athlete	Event	Group stage				Semifinal	Final	
Athlete	Event	Opposition Score	Opposition Score	Opposition Score	Rank	Opposition Score	Opposition Score	Rank
Evgeny Plakhutin	−60 kg	Kalniņš (LAT); L 0−1	Gogoloşi (ROU); W 5−0	Şamdan (TUR); W 5−1	2 Q	Farzaliyev (AZE); L 0−0	Did not advance	3rd place, bronze medalist(s)

== Sambo ==
Key:

- ML – Minimal advantage by last technical evaluation
- MT – Minimal advantage by technical points
- VH – Total victory – painful hold
- VO – Victory by technical points – the loser without technical points
- VP – Victory by technical points – the loser with technical points
- VS – Total victory by decisive superiority
- VT – Total victory – total throw

Men

Athlete	Event	Quarterfinals	Semifinals	Repechage	Final / BM	
Athlete	Event	Opposition Result	Opposition Result	Opposition Result	Opposition Result	Rank
Andrei Kubarkov	−52 kg	Nadareishvili (GEO); W 4−3^{VP}	Kirakosyan (ARM); L 3−3^{ML}	Bye	Rîmă (ROU); W 5−0^{VH}	3rd place, bronze medalist(s)
Sayan Khertek	−57 kg	Çelik (TUR); W 3−0^{VO}	Manukyan (ARM); W 4−0^{VH}	Bye	Chidrashvili (GEO); L 1−1^{VP}	2nd place, silver medalist(s)
Ruslan Bagdasarian	−62 kg	Yevdoshenko (UKR); W 2−0^{VH}	Chirgadze (GEO); W 0−0^{VH}	Bye	Karakizidis (GRE); W 2−0^{VO}	1st place, gold medalist(s)
Nikita Kletskov	−68 kg	Liluashvili (GEO); L 2−2^{MT}	Did not advance	Szőke (ROU); W 3−1^{VP}	Galbiati (ITA); W 5−0^{VH}	3rd place, bronze medalist(s)
Stanislav Skryabin	−74 kg	Ghazaryan (ARM); W 2−1^{VO}	Sumpor (CRO); W 4−0^{VH}	Bye	Nakhutsrishvili (GEO); L 1−5^{VO}	2nd place, silver medalist(s)
Andrey Perepelyuk	−82 kg	Balampanasvili (GRE); W 1−1^{VH}	Yemelyanau (BLR); W 0−0^{VT}	Bye	Grigoryan (ARM); W 7−0^{VH}	1st place, gold medalist(s)
Sergey Ryabov	−90 kg	Stetsenko (UKR); W 4−0^{VO}	Sahakyan (ARM); W 3−1^{VO}	Bye	Kazusionak (BLR); W 3−1^{VP}	1st place, gold medalist(s)
Alsim Chernoskulov	−100 kg	Loriashvili (GEO); L 0−1^{VO}	Did not advance	Stsepankou (BLR); W 1−0^{VO}	Segard (FRA); W 5−1^{VP}	3rd place, bronze medalist(s)
Artem Osipenko	+100 kg	Gajić (SRB); L 1−5^{VO}	Did not advance	Herbreteau (FRA); W 5−0^{VH}	Bondarenko (UKR); W 1−0^{VO}	3rd place, bronze medalist(s)

Women

Athlete	Event	Quarterfinals	Semifinals	Repechage	Final / BM	
Athlete	Event	Opposition Result	Opposition Result	Opposition Result	Opposition Result	Rank
Elena Bondareva	−48 kg	Wojciak (FRA); W 1−0^{VH}	Chiss (ROU); W 2−2^{ML}	Bye	Novikova (UKR); W 2−0^{VP}	1st place, gold medalist(s)
Diana Ryabova	−52 kg	Ivanova (BUL); W 0−0^{VH}	Buiok (UKR); W 0−0^{VS}	Bye	Zharskaya (BLR); W 0−0^{VH}	1st place, gold medalist(s)
Tatiana Kazeniuk	−56 kg	Ilkiv (UKR); W 2−0^{VO}	Gogua (GRE); W 8−0^{VS}	Bye	Arkhipava (BLR); W 8−0^{VS}	1st place, gold medalist(s)
Yana Kostenko	−60 kg	Ovtsarenko (EST); W 9−0^{VS}	Harelikava (BLR); L 2−3^{VP}	Bye	Shevchenko (UKR); W 2−0^{VO}	3rd place, bronze medalist(s)
Ekaterina Onoprienko	−64 kg	Matsko (BLR); W 8−0^{VS}	Valvoi (ROU); W 9−0^{VS}	Bye	Sayko (UKR); W 7−0^{VO}	1st place, gold medalist(s)
Marina Mokhnatkina	−68 kg	Moskalova (UKR); L 3−3^{VP}	Did not advance	Le Gall (FRA); W 2−0^{VH}	Budeanu (MDA); W 0−0^{VH}	3rd place, bronze medalist(s)
Galina Ambartsumian	−72 kg	Smal (UKR); L 1−2^{VO}	Did not advance	Bolohan (MDA); W 1−1^{MT}	Larose (FRA); W 4−0^{VH}	3rd place, bronze medalist(s)
Zhanara Kusanova	−80 kg	Gorissen (NED); W 1−0^{VH}	Bru (FRA); W 0−0^{VH}	Bye	Oryashkova (BUL); L 1−1^{MT}	2nd place, silver medalist(s)
Anna Balashova	+80 kg	Kebadze (GEO); L 0−1^{VO}	Did not advance	Bye	Kaliuzhnaya (BLR); W 1−0^{VH}	3rd place, bronze medalist(s)

== Shooting ==
Men

Athlete	Event	Qualification		Final	
Athlete	Event	Points	Rank	Points	Rank
Alexander Alifirenko	25 m rapid fire pistol	579	6 Q	21	4
Aleksey Alipov	Trap	118	5 Q	24	5
Anton Aristarkhov	10 m air pistol	579	7 Q	117.3	8
Artem Chernousov	10 m air pistol	585	1 Q	241.4	1st place, gold medalist(s)
Kirill Grigoryan	50 m rifle 3 positions	1168	14	Did not advance	
Sergey Kamenskiy	10 m air rifle	631.1	1 Q	250.0	2nd place, silver medalist(s)
Sergey Kamenskiy	50 m rifle 3 positions	1182	1 Q	461.6	1st place, gold medalist(s)
Vladimir Maslennikov	10 m air rifle	629.1	4 Q	165.9	6
Mikhail Sharapov	Skeet	110	25	Did not advance	
Nikita Sukhanov	25 m rapid fire pistol	572	14	Did not advance	
Alexander Zemlin	Skeet	115	18	Did not advance	

Women

Athlete	Event	Qualification		Final	
Athlete	Event	Points	Rank	Points	Rank
Vitalina Batsarashkina	10 m air pistol	576	4 Q	198.0	4
Vitalina Batsarashkina	25 m pistol	586	2 Q	27	4
Anastasiia Galashina	10 m air rifle	625.3	10	Did not advance	
Yulia Karimova	10 m air rifle	629.8	1 Q	185.3	5
Polina Khorosheva	50 m rifle 3 positions	1166	4 Q	444.0	3rd place, bronze medalist(s)
Polina Kniazeva	Trap	103	11	Did not advance	
Margarita Lomova	25 m pistol	578	16	Did not advance	
Svetlana Medvedeva	10 m air pistol	571	11	Did not advance	
Daria Semianova	Trap	100	20	Did not advance	
Albina Shakirova	Skeet	116+1	4 Q	33	4
Yulia Zykova	50 m rifle 3 positions	1165	5 Q	459.6	1st place, gold medalist(s)

Mixed team

Athlete	Event	Qualification				Final / BM	
Athlete	Event	Stage 1		Stage 2		Final / BM	
Athlete	Event	Points	Rank	Points	Rank	Opposition Result	Rank
Sergey Kamenskiy; Yulia Karimova	10 m air rifle	625.6	5 Q	417.8	2 Q	Maslennikov / Galashina (RUS); W 16–12	1st place, gold medalist(s)
Vladimir Maslennikov; Anastasiia Galashina	10 m air rifle	629.1	1 Q	417.8	1 Q	Kamenskiy / Karimova (RUS); L 12–16	2nd place, silver medalist(s)
Anton Aristarkhov; Svetlana Medvedeva	10 m air pistol	568	16	Did not advance			
Artem Chernousov; Vitalina Batsarashkina	10 m air pistol	580	2 Q	389	1 Q	Mikec / Arunović (SRB); W 17–9	1st place, gold medalist(s)
Aleksey Alipov; Daria Semianova	Trap	137	3 q	—N/a		Grazini / Stanco (ITA); W 45–43	3rd place, bronze medalist(s)
Alexander Zemlin; Albina Shakirova	Skeet	137	8	—N/a		Did not advance	

Athlete	Event	Qualification		Semifinals	Final					
Athlete	Event	Qualification		Semifinals	Round 1		Round 2		Round 3	
Athlete	Event	Points	Rank	Opposition Result	Points	Rank	Points	Rank	Points	Rank
Artem Chernousov; Margarita Lomova	25 m standard pistol	545	11	Did not advance						
Nikita Sukhanov; Svetlana Medvedeva	25 m standard pistol	549	8 Q	Karsch / Reitz (GER); L 379.5–384.3	Did not advance					
Anton Aristarkhov; Svetlana Medvedeva	50 m pistol	354	5 Q	Chernousov / Lomova (RUS); L 175–178	Did not advance					
Artem Chernousov; Margarita Lomova	50 m pistol	355	4 Q	Aristarkhov / Medvedeva (RUS); W 178–175	97.3	1 Q	89.6	1 Q	94.0	1st place, gold medalist(s)
Kirill Grigoryan; Polina Khorosheva	50 m rifle prone	415.5	1 Q	Link / Gschwandtner (GER); W 207.5–200.6	206.8	2 Q	208.3+19.8	3rd place, bronze medalist(s)	Did not advance	
Sergey Kamenskiy; Yulia Zykova	50 m rifle prone	408.9	19	Did not advance						

== Table tennis ==
Athlete	Event	Round 1	Round 2	Round 3	Round of 16	Quarterfinals	Semifinals	Final / BM	
Athlete	Event	Opposition Result	Opposition Result	Opposition Result	Opposition Result	Opposition Result	Opposition Result	Opposition Result	Rank
Alexander Shibaev	Men's singles	Bye	Badowski (POL); W 4–0	Falck (SWE); W 4–0	Kou (UKR); L 1–4	Did not advance			
Kirill Skachkov	Men's singles	Bye	Szudi (HUN); W 4–1	Jorgić (SLO); W 4–3	Samsonov (BLR); L 2–4	Did not advance			
Polina Mikhailova	Women's singles	Bye	Bye	Piccolin (ITA); W 4–1	Ekholm (SWE); W 4–3	Yang (MON); L 0–4	Did not advance		
Yana Noskova	Women's singles	Bye	Dvorak (ESP); W 4–1	Li (POL); L 0–4	Did not advance				
Polina Mikhailova; Yana Noskova; Olga Vorobyeva	Women's team	—N/a			Poland; L 0–3	Did not advance			
Alexander Shibaev; Polina Mikhailova	Mixed doubles	—N/a			Fegerl / Polcanova (AUT); W 3–1	Ionescu / Szőcs (ROU); L 0–3	Did not advance		

== Wrestling ==
Key:

- VFA – Victory by fall
- VFO – Victory by forfeit
- VIN – Victory by injury
- VPO – Victory by points – the loser without technical points
- VPO1 – Victory by points – the loser with technical points
- VSU – Victory by technical superiority – the loser without technical points and a margin of victory of at least 8 (Greco-Roman) or 10 (freestyle) points
- VSU1 – Victory by technical superiority – the loser with technical points and a margin of victory of at least 8 (Greco-Roman) or 10 (freestyle) points

Men's freestyle

Athlete	Event	Round of 16	Quarterfinals	Semifinals	Repechage	Final / BM	
Athlete	Event	Opposition Result	Opposition Result	Opposition Result	Opposition Result	Opposition Result	Rank
Zaur Uguev	−57 kg	Chirtoacă (MDA); W 11−0^{VSU}	Barseghyan (ARM); W 10−0^{VSU}	Amiraslanov (AZE); L 2−3^{VPO1}	Bye	Vangelov (BUL); W 10−2^{VPO1}	3rd place, bronze medalist(s)
Akhmed Chakaev	−65 kg	Vejseli (MKD); W 9−1^{VPO1}	Bieńkowski (POL); W 7−0^{VPO}	Khinchegashvili (GEO); L 2−8^{VPO1}	Bye	Perpeliță (MDA); W 8−5^{VPO1}	3rd place, bronze medalist(s)
Zaurbek Sidakov	−74 kg	Bye	Kentchadze (GEO); W 5−3^{VPO1}	Nurykau (BLR); W 6−4^{VPO1}	Bye	Demirtaş (TUR); W 4−0^{VFA}	1st place, gold medalist(s)
Dauren Kurugliev	−86 kg	Amine (SMR); W 6−0^{VFO}	Baranowski (POL); W 4−3^{VPO1}	Gostiyev (AZE); W 6−3^{VPO1}	Bye	Shabanau (BLR); W 3−2^{VPO1}	1st place, gold medalist(s)
Abdulrashid Sadulaev	−97 kg	Szabó (HUN); W 11−0^{VSU}	Nurov (MKD); W 6−0^{VPO}	Hushtyn (BLR); W 6−0^{VPO}	Bye	Gadzhiyev (AZE); W 0−0^{VIN}	1st place, gold medalist(s)
Anzor Khizriev	−125 kg	Kariotakis (GRE); W 11−0^{VSU}	Yaşarlı (TUR); W 9−4^{VPO1}	Khotsianivskyi (UKR); W 7−1^{VPO1}	Bye	Matcharashvili (GEO); W 8−2^{VPO1}	1st place, gold medalist(s)

Men's Greco-Roman

Athlete	Event	Round of 16	Quarterfinals	Semifinals	Repechage	Final / BM	
Athlete	Event	Opposition Result	Opposition Result	Opposition Result	Opposition Result	Opposition Result	Rank
Stepan Maryanyan	−60 kg	Ciobanu (MDA); W 9−1^{VSU1}	Kamal (TUR); W 5−2^{VPO1}	Abovian (UKR); W 9−0^{VSU}	Bye	Torba (HUN); W 9−0^{VSU}	1st place, gold medalist(s)
Zaur Kabaloev	−67 kg	Weiss (GER); W 9−0^{VSU1}	Daurov (BLR); W 1−1^{VPO1}	Kalinichenko (UKR); W 4−0^{VPO}	Bye	Bolkvadze (GEO); W 3−1^{VPO1}	1st place, gold medalist(s)
Aleksandr Chekhirkin	−77 kg	Aleksandrov (BUL); W 3−3^{VPO1}	Kessidis (SWE); W 6−0^{VPO}	Başar (TUR); W 8−0^{VSU}	Bye	Chalyan (ARM); W 7−6^{VPO1}	1st place, gold medalist(s)
Bekkhan Ozdoev	−87 kg	Başar (TUR); W 5−0^{VPO}	Huklek (CRO); L 8−9^{VPO1}	Did not advance			
Aleksandr Golovin	−97 kg	Krysov (UKR); W 11−0^{VSU}	Noumonvi (FRA); W 9−0^{VSU}	Aleksanyan (ARM); L 1−3^{VPO1}	Bye	Nadareishvili (GEO); W 5−1^{VPO1}	3rd place, bronze medalist(s)
Sergey Semenov	−130 kg	Krahmer (GER); W 2−0^{VPO}	Yildirim (TUR); W 7−1^{VPO1}	Hryshchanka (BLR); L 1−3^{VPO1}	Bye	Kuchmii (UKR); W 10−1^{VSU1}	(silver)

Women's freestyle

Athlete	Event	Round of 16	Quarterfinals	Semifinals	Repechage	Final / BM	
Athlete	Event	Opposition Result	Opposition Result	Opposition Result	Opposition Result	Opposition Result	Rank
Anzhelika Vetoshkina	−50 kg	Selishka (BUL); L 0−11^{VSU}	Did not advance				
Stalvira Orshush	−53 kg	Kozłow (POL); W 10−0^{VSU}	Prevolaraki (GRE); W 2−2^{VPO1}	Khavaldzhy (UKR); L 4−7^{VPO1}	Bye	Dénes (HUN); W 10−0^{VSU}	3rd place, bronze medalist(s)
Maria Kuznetsova	−62 kg	Bye	Tkach (UKR); L 1−6^{VPO1}	Did not advance	Pérez (ESP); W 10–3^{VPO1}	Yusein (BUL); W 7–4^{VPO1}	3rd place, bronze medalist(s)
Anastasia Bratchikova	−68 kg	Tosun (TUR); W 4−2^{VPO1}	Fransson (SWE); W 2−2^{VPO1}	Cherkasova (UKR); W 4−2^{VPO1}	Bye	Grigorjeva (LAT); L 3−5^{VPO1}	2nd place, silver medalist(s)
Natalia Vorobieva	−76 kg	Marzaliuk (BLR); L 1−2^{VPO1}	Did not advance		Kuenz (AUT); W 17–6^{VSU1}	Mäe (EST); L 3−5^{VPO1}	5
