= Shooting at the 2019 European Games – Mixed team 50 metre pistol =

Mixed team 50 meter pistol at the 2019 European Games
- Venue: Shooting Centre
- Dates: 24 June
- Competitors: 20 from 7 nations

Medalists
gold medal	Margarita Lomova; Artem Chernousov	Russia
silver medal	Agate Rašmane; Lauris Strautmanis	Latvia
bronze medal	Nino Salukvadze; Tsotne Machavariani	Georgia

The mixed team 50 meter pistol event at the 2019 European Games in Minsk, Belarus took place on 24 June at the Shooting Centre.

== Schedule ==
All times are local (UTC+3).

Date	Time	Event
Monday, 24 June 2019	09:00	Qualification
Monday, 24 June 2019	10:00	Semifinal
Monday, 24 June 2019	11:20	Final

== Results ==
=== Qualification ===
Rank	Athlete	Country	Series		Total	Team total	Notes
Rank	Athlete	Country	1	2	Total	Team total	Notes
1	Olena Kostevych	Ukraine 1	89	92	181-4x	370-10x	Q
1	Oleh Omelchuk	Ukraine 1	92	97	189-6x	370-10x	Q
2	Nino Salukvadze	Georgia	89	87	176-1x	364-5x	Q
2	Tsotne Machavariani	Georgia	93	95	188-4x	364-5x	Q
3	Agate Rašmane	Latvia	83	92	175-1x	357-2x	Q
3	Lauris Strautmanis	Latvia	91	91	182-1x	357-2x	Q
4	Margarita Lomova	Russia 1	87	77	164-0x	355-0x	Q
4	Artem Chernousov	Russia 1	96	95	191-0x	355-0x	Q
5	Svetlana Medvedeva	Russia 2	86	84	170-1x	354-2x	Q
5	Anton Aristarkhov	Russia 2	90	94	184-1x	354-2x	Q
6	Viktoria Chaika	Belarus 1	90	88	178-0x	352-0x	Q
6	Abdul-Aziz Kurdzi	Belarus 1	86	88	174-0x	352-0x	Q
7	Heidi Diethelm Gerber	Switzerland	89	84	173-2x	349-3x	Q
7	Steve Demierre	Switzerland	88	88	176-1x	349-3x	Q
8	Katsiaryna Kruchanok	Belarus 2	90	77	167-2x	347-4x	Q
8	Yauheni Zaichyk	Belarus 2	90	90	180-2x	347-4x	Q
9	Anna Korakaki	Greece	91	85	176-3x	346-4x	
9	Dionysios Korakakis	Greece	84	86	170-1x	346-4x	
10	Oksana Kovalchuk	Ukraine 2	80	82	162-0x	342-3x	
10	Pavlo Korostylov	Ukraine 2	92	88	180-3x	342-3x	

=== Semifinal ===
Athlete	Country	Total	Notes
Olena Kostevych; Oleh Omelchuk	Ukraine 1	177	
Katsiaryna Kruchanok; Yauheni Zaichyk	Belarus 2	178	QF
Nino Salukvadze; Tsotne Machavariani	Georgia	172	QF
Heidi Diethelm Gerber; Steve Demierre	Switzerland	170	
Agate Rašmane; Lauris Strautmanis	Latvia	171	QF
Viktoria Chaika; Abdul-Aziz Kurdzi	Belarus 1	169	
Margarita Lomova; Artem Chernousov	Russia 1	178	QF
Svetlana Medvedeva; Anton Aristarkhov	Russia 2	175	

=== Final ===
Rank	Athlete	Country	Series		
Rank	Athlete	Country	1	2	3
1st place, gold medalist(s)	Margarita Lomova; Artem Chernousov	Russia 1	97.3	89.6	94.0
2nd place, silver medalist(s)	Agate Rašmane; Lauris Strautmanis	Latvia	92.4	88.2	81.3
3rd place, bronze medalist(s)	Nino Salukvadze; Tsotne Machavariani	Georgia	87.7	87.7	
4	Katsiaryna Kruchanok; Yauheni Zaichyk	Belarus 2	84.6		
