= Shooting at the 2019 European Games – Men's 10 metre air pistol =

Men's 10 metre air pistol at the 2019 European Games
- Venue: Shooting Centre
- Dates: 23 June
- Competitors: 36 from 28 nations

Medalists
gold medal	Artem Chernousov	Russia
silver medal	Oleh Omelchuk	Ukraine
bronze medal	Lauris Strautmanis	Latvia

The men's 10 metre air pistol event at the 2019 European Games in Minsk, Belarus took place on 23 June at the Shooting Centre.

== Schedule ==
All times are FET (UTC+03:00)

Date	Time	Event
Sunday, 23 June 2019	09:15	Qualification
Sunday, 23 June 2019	11:30	Final

== Records ==
Prior to this competition, the existing world, European and Games records were as follows.

Qualification
World Record	Jin Jong-oh (KOR)	594	Changwon, South Korea	12 April 2009
European Record	Sergei Pyzhianov (URS)	593	Munich, West Germany	13 October 1989
Games Record	Oleh Omelchuk (UKR)	583	Baku, Azerbaijan	17 June 2015
Final
World Record	Saurabh Chaudhary (IND)	246.3	Munich, Germany	27 May 2019
European Record	Artem Chernousov (RUS)	243.8	Munich, Germany	27 May 2019
Games Record	ISSF Rule changed on 01.01.2018	–	–	–

== Results ==
=== Qualification ===
The qualification round took place on 23 June to determine the qualifiers for the finals.

Rank	Athlete	Country	1	2	3	4	5	6	Total	Xs	Notes
1	Artem Chernousov	Russia	99	98	95	97	98	98	585	19	Q, GR
2	Juraj Tužinský	Slovakia	98	99	99	96	97	94	583	26	Q
3	Damir Mikec	Serbia	96	97	97	99	97	97	583	21	Q
4	Paolo Monna	Italy	96	98	96	96	98	98	582	22	Q
5	Oleh Omelchuk	Ukraine	96	97	99	95	99	94	580	22	Q
6	Pablo Carrera	Spain	96	96	99	97	95	96	579	20	Q
7	Anton Aristarkhov	Russia	95	98	94	99	99	94	579	20	Q
8	Lauris Strautmanis	Latvia	96	98	96	94	96	99	579	17	Q
9	Christian Reitz	Germany	99	95	93	99	94	98	578	21	
10	João Costa	Portugal	94	98	95	96	98	97	578	18	
11	Dimitrije Grgić	Serbia	99	95	95	95	96	98	578	17	
12	Piotr Daniluk	Poland	97	95	98	95	96	96	577	19	
13	Pavlo Korostylov	Ukraine	94	98	97	96	97	95	577	19	
14	Giuseppe Giordano	Italy	95	93	95	97	100	96	576	17	
15	Yusuf Dikeç	Turkey	94	96	96	96	95	98	575	17	
16	Samuil Donkov	Bulgaria	93	93	98	96	97	98	575	14	
17	Peeter Olesk	Estonia	97	97	92	97	96	95	574	24	
18	Abdul-Aziz Kurdzi	Belarus	93	99	95	97	97	93	574	19	
19	Steve Demierre	Switzerland	93	98	96	97	95	95	574	16	
20	Ruslan Lunev	Azerbaijan	96	98	90	96	97	97	574	14	
21	Tsotne Machavariani	Georgia	96	94	94	97	95	95	571	20	
22	Kevin Venta	Germany	95	93	94	99	95	95	571	13	
23	Florian Fouquet	France	97	92	95	93	97	96	570	15	
24	Jindřich Dubový	Czech Republic	95	97	94	91	93	100	570	7	
25	Mathieu Perie	France	94	97	96	91	95	96	569	15	
26	Andrei Alferin	Moldova	97	94	96	94	95	93	569	14	
27	Morgan Gunnar Johansson	Sweden	95	94	96	94	96	94	569	13	
28	Yauheni Zaichyk	Belarus	95	94	96	93	95	95	568	14	
29	Frederik Larsen	Denmark	94	91	96	95	97	94	567	16	
30	Borjan Brankovski	North Macedonia	96	95	96	92	96	92	567	10	
31	Dionysios Korakakis	Greece	92	94	94	97	94	95	566	12	
32	Ásgeir Sigurgeirsson	Iceland	95	93	94	93	97	93	565	15	
33	Szymon Wojtyna	Poland	96	93	93	94	98	91	565	11	
34	Kristian Callaghan	Great Britain	97	92	92	93	95	93	562	10	
35	Thomas Havlicek	Austria	86	91	91	92	95	90	545	13	
36	Henri Rrufa	Albania	86	94	88	91	91	92	542	7	

=== Final ===
The final round took place on 23 June to determine the final classification.

Rank	Athlete	Series									Total	Notes
Rank	Athlete	1	2	3	4	5	6	7	8	9	Total	Notes
1st place, gold medalist(s)	Artem Chernousov (RUS)	50.9	48.5	20.0	20.6	20.1	21.0	20.3	20.1	19.9	241.4	GR
1st place, gold medalist(s)	Artem Chernousov (RUS)	50.9	99.4	119.4	140.0	160.1	181.1	201.4	221.5	241.4	241.4	GR
2nd place, silver medalist(s)	Oleh Omelchuk (UKR)	50.5	50.1	19.8	20.0	19.7	20.4	18.5	20.6	20.0	239.6	
2nd place, silver medalist(s)	Oleh Omelchuk (UKR)	50.5	100.6	120.4	140.4	160.1	180.5	199.0	219.6	239.6	239.6	
3rd place, bronze medalist(s)	Lauris Strautmanis (LAT)	50.0	50.2	20.0	18.8	19.8	21.2	19.4	19.9		219.3	
3rd place, bronze medalist(s)	Lauris Strautmanis (LAT)	50.0	100.2	120.2	139.0	158.8	180.0	199.4	219.3		219.3	
4	Juraj Tužinský (SVK)	50.6	50.2	19.9	20.9	19.0	19.7	18.2			198.5	
4	Juraj Tužinský (SVK)	50.6	100.8	120.7	141.6	160.6	180.3	198.5			198.5	
5	Paolo Monna (ITA)	50.0	49.0	20.4	19.0	20.0	19.0				177.4	
5	Paolo Monna (ITA)	50.0	99.0	119.4	138.4	158.4	177.4				177.4	
6	Pablo Carrera (ESP)	49.5	48.7	20.7	20.2	18.4					157.5	
6	Pablo Carrera (ESP)	49.5	98.2	118.9	139.1	157.5					157.5	
7	Damir Mikec (SRB)	49.4	50.3	18.5	18.5						137.6	
7	Damir Mikec (SRB)	49.4	99.7	118.2	137.6						137.6	
8	Anton Aristarkhov (RUS)	47.9	50.7	18.7							117.3	
8	Anton Aristarkhov (RUS)	47.9	98.6	117.3							117.3	
