= Shooting at the 2015 European Games – Mixed 10 metre air pistol =

Mixed team 10 metre air pistol at the 2015 European Games
- Venue: Baku Shooting Centre
- Date: 18 June
- Competitors: 20 from 12 nations

Medalists
gold medal	Christian Reitz; Monika Karsch	Germany
silver medal	Konstantinos Malgarinos; Anna Korakaki	Greece
bronze medal	Vladimir Gontcharov; Ekaterina Korshunova	Russia

The Mixed 10 metre air pistol competition at the 2015 European Games in Baku, Azerbaijan was held on 18 June at the Baku Shooting Centre.

== Schedule ==
All times are local (UTC+5).

Date	Time	Event
Monday, 22 June 2015	9:30	Qualification
Monday, 22 June 2015	18:15	Final

== Results ==
Rank	Team	Series					Total	Xs	Notes
Rank	Team	1	2	3	4	5	Total	Xs	Notes
1	Spain (ESP)	98	97	98	92	98	483	13	
	Sonia Franquet	48	48	49	46	50	241	7	
	Pablo Carrera	50	49	49	46	48	242	6	
2	Serbia (SRB)	97	96	96	96	96	481	15	
	Bobana Veličković	49	48	49	48	48	242	6	
	Dimitrije Grgić	48	48	47	48	48	239	9	
3	Russia (RUS)	93	98	97	98	93	479	14	
	Ekaterina Korshunova	46	49	48	50	45	238	5	
	Vladimir Gontcharov	47	49	49	48	48	241	9	
4	Greece (GRE)	95	100	95	94	94	478	13	
	Anna Korakaki	48	50	46	46	49	239	5	
	Konstantinos Malgarinos	47	50	49	48	45	239	8	
5	Ukraine (UKR)	97	98	92	95	95	477	16	
	Olena Kostevych	49	49	46	47	47	238	7	
	Oleh Omelchuk	48	49	46	48	48	239	9	
6	Poland (POL)	93	96	97	95	95	476	12	
	Klaudia Breś	44	49	48	47	47	235	4	
	Wojciech Knapik	49	47	49	48	48	241	8	
7	Latvia (LAT)	96	92	97	97	93	475	11	
	Agate Rašmane	48	45	50	48	47	238	5	
	Lauris Strautmanis	48	47	47	49	46	237	6	
8	Germany (GER)	93	98	93	96	94	474	14	
	Monika Karsch	47	49	46	48	47	237	8	
	Christian Reitz	46	49	47	48	47	237	6	
9	Portugal (POR)	93	96	96	95	93	473	11	
	Joana Castelao	46	47	49	47	46	235	5	
	João Costa	47	49	47	48	47	238	6	
10	Azerbaijan (AZE)	98	95	93	93	94	473	8	
	Irada Ashumova	48	47	46	46	46	233	3	
	Ruslan Lunev	50	48	47	47	48	240	5	
11	Croatia (CRO)	94	94	93	94	97	472	9	
	Marija Marović	48	45	45	46	49	233	5	
	Željko Posavec	46	49	48	48	48	239	4	
12	Bulgaria (BUL)	95	93	94	94	95	471	9	
	Antoaneta Boneva	47	48	47	48	47	237	3	
	Samuil Donkov	48	45	47	46	48	234	6	
13	Italy (ITA)	93	95	93	93	96	470	14	
	Giustina Chiaberto	44	48	46	46	47	231	4	
	Luca Tesconi	49	47	47	47	49	239	10	
14	Georgia (GEO)	96	93	93	94	94	470	7	
	Nino Salukvadze	49	45	45	47	47	233	4	
	Tsotne Machavariani	47	48	48	47	47	237	3	
15	Hungary (HUN)	94	93	93	93	93	466	11	
	Adrienn Nemes	50	47	47	48	47	239	7	
	István Jambrik	44	46	46	45	46	227	4	
16	France (FRA)	92	93	93	95	92	465	9	
	Celine Goberville	48	46	46	48	46	234	4	
	Mathieu Perie	44	47	47	47	46	231	5	
17	Czech Republic (CZE)	91	94	92	90	93	460	8	
	Tereza Přibáňová	47	47	44	44	46	228	3	
	Jindřich Dubový	44	47	48	46	47	232	5	

=== Semi-final ===
==== Semi-final 1 ====
Rank	Team	Series					Total	Xs
Rank	Team	1	2	3	4	5	Total	Xs
1	Greece (GRE)	62.0	58.2	39.7	40.7	39.0	239.6	
	Anna Korakaki	31.2	29.8	20.3	20.3	20.6	122.2	
	Konstantinos Malgarinos	30.8	28.4	19.4	20.4	18.4	117.4	
2	Spain (ESP)	61.6	59.7	39.9	38.0	39.9	239.1	
	Sonia Franquet	31.3	30.0	20.6	18.4	19.5	119.8	
	Pablo Carrera	30.3	29.7	19.3	19.6	20.4	119.3	
3	Ukraine (UKR)	60.2	58.9	38.8	39.1	197.0		
	Olena Kostevych	30.7	30.3	19.7	19.8	100.5		
	Oleh Omelchuk	29.5	28.6	19.1	19.3	96.5		
4	Latvia (LAT)	54.6	59.8	40.4	154.8			
	Agate Rašmane	24.9	29.6	20.2	74.7			
	Lauris Strautmanis	29.7	30.2	20.2	80.1			

==== Semi-final 2 ====
Rank	Team	Series					Total	Xs
Rank	Team	1	2	3	4	5	Total	Xs
1	Germany (GER)	58.8	59.9	40.9	40.6	37.5	237.7	
	Monika Karsch	29.7	29.5	19.6	19.8	18.2	116.8	
	Christian Reitz	29.1	30.4	21.3	20.8	19.3	120.9	
2	Russia (RUS)	59.0	59.9	39.0	38.0	40.4	236.3	
	Ekaterina Korshunova	29.8	30.2	18.6	18.8	20.2	117.6	
	Vladimir Gontcharov	29.2	29.7	20.4	19.2	20.2	118.7	
3	Poland (POL)	61.0	57.6	38.7	38.0	195.3		
	Klaudia Breś	29.9	30.5	20.6	19.8	100.8		
	Wojciech Knapik	31.1	27.1	18.1	18.2	94.5		
4	Serbia (SRB)	59.0	58.9	38.5	156.4			
	Bobana Veličković	29.1	29.9	20.2	79.2			
	Dimitrije Grgić	29.9	29.0	18.3	77.2			

=== Finals ===
==== Bronze medal match ====
Rank	Team	Total
3rd place, bronze medalist(s)	Russia (RUS)	5
	Ekaterina Korshunova	
	Vladimir Gontcharov	
4	Spain (ESP)	4
	Pablo Carrera	
	Sonia Franquet	

==== Gold medal match ====
Rank	Team	Total
1st place, gold medalist(s)	Germany (GER)	5
	Monika Karsch	
	Christian Reitz	
2nd place, silver medalist(s)	Greece (GRE)	4
	Anna Korakaki	
	Konstantinos Malgarinos	
