= Shooting at the 2016 Summer Olympics – Women's 25 metre pistol =

Women's 25 metre pistol at the Games of the XXXI Olympiad
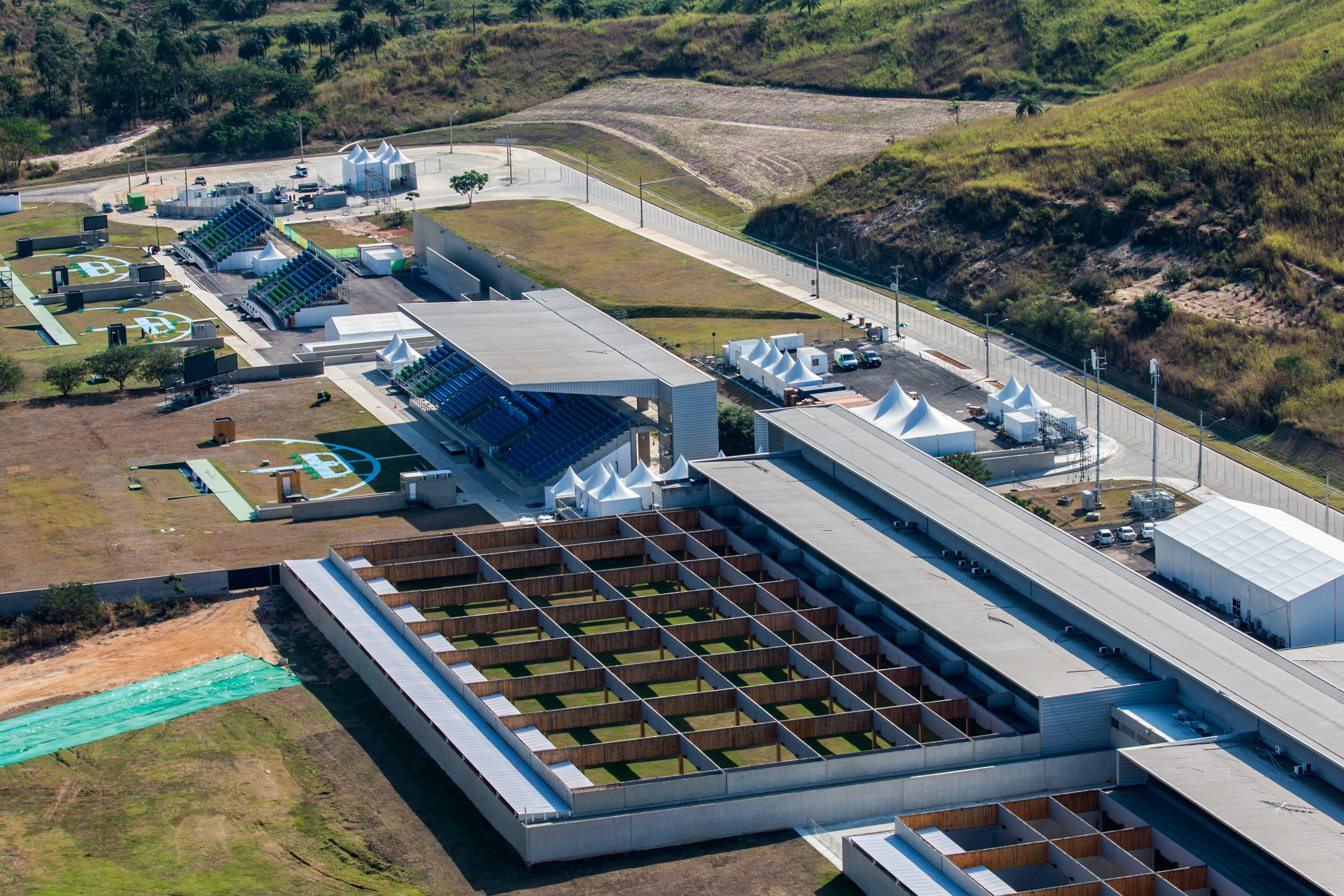
- Aerial view of the National Shooting Center in Deodoro, where the Women's 25 metre pistol took place.
- Venue: National Shooting Center
- Date: 9 August 2016
- Competitors: 40 from 30 nations
- Winning total: 8 points (in the gold medal match)

Medalists
1st place, gold medalist(s)		Anna Korakaki	Greece
2nd place, silver medalist(s)		Monika Karsch	Germany
3rd place, bronze medalist(s)		Heidi Diethelm Gerber	Switzerland

The Women's 25 metre pistol event at the 2016 Olympic Games took place on 9 August 2016 at the National Shooting Center.

The event consisted of three rounds: a qualifier, semifinal and a final. In the qualifier, each shooter fired 60 shots with a pistol at 25 metres distance. Scores for each shot were in increments of 1, with a maximum score of 10. The first 30 shots were in the precision stage, with series of 5 shots being shot within 5 minutes. The second set of 30 shots gave shooters 3 seconds to take each shot.

The medals were presented by René Fasel, IOC member, Switzerland and Susan Abbott, Council Member of the International Shooting Sport Federation.

== Records ==
Prior to this competition, the existing world and Olympic records were as follows.

Qualification records
World record	Diana Iorgova (BUL); Tao Luna (CHN)	594	Milan, Italy; Munich, Germany	31 May 1994; 23 August 2002
Olympic record	Kim Jang-mi (KOR)	591	London, United Kingdom	8 August 2012

Final records
World record	ISSF Rule changed on 1 January 2013	—	—	—
Olympic record	ISSF Rule changed on 1 January 2013	—	—	—

== Qualification round ==
Rank	Athlete	Country	1	2	3	PR	4	5	6	RF	Total	Notes
1	Zhang Jingjing	China	98	98	97	293	100	99	100	299	592	Q, OR
2	Anna Korakaki	Greece	100	99	98	297	93	94	100	287	584	Q
3	Nino Salukvadze	Georgia	95	97	97	289	97	98	100	295	584	Q
4	Monika Karsch	Germany	96	98	95	289	98	98	98	294	583	Q
5	Antoaneta Boneva	Bulgaria	97	98	98	293	96	98	96	290	583	Q
6	Jo Yong-suk	North Korea	96	97	96	289	95	99	99	293	582	Q
7	Heidi Diethelm Gerber	Switzerland	98	96	97	291	97	96	98	291	582	Q
8	Ekaterina Korshunova	Russia	95	98	99	292	99	97	94	290	582	Q
9	Kim Jang-mi	South Korea	96	95	97	288	98	100	96	294	582	
10	Zsófia Csonka	Hungary	96	95	97	288	97	98	98	293	581	
11	Tsogbadrakhyn Mönkhzul	Mongolia	99	94	96	289	97	96	98	291	580	
12	Otryadyn Gündegmaa	Mongolia	94	94	96	284	99	99	97	295	579	
13	Vitalina Batsarashkina	Russia	96	98	95	289	95	98	96	289	578	
14	Lalita Yauhleuskaya	Australia	99	97	94	290	94	97	97	288	578	
15	Klaudia Breś	Poland	98	94	99	291	95	95	97	287	578	
16	Renáta Tobai-Sike	Hungary	97	95	96	288	95	97	97	289	577	
17	Hwang Seong-eun	South Korea	95	97	96	288	98	94	97	289	577	
18	Yu Ai-wen	Chinese Taipei	96	97	95	288	96	97	96	289	577	
19	Zorana Arunović	Serbia	98	97	98	293	91	96	96	283	576	
20	Heena Sidhu	India	95	95	96	286	97	97	96	290	576	
21	Bobana Veličković	Serbia	99	99	97	295	93	95	93	281	576	
22	Olena Kostevych	Ukraine	96	99	97	292	92	94	97	283	575	
23	Pim-on Klaisuban	Thailand	94	96	97	287	94	97	97	288	575	
24	Viktoria Chaika	Belarus	97	96	99	292	94	94	95	283	575	
25	Afaf El-Hodhod	Egypt	97	98	98	293	95	94	91	280	573	
26	Stéphanie Tirode	France	97	94	97	288	99	92	94	285	573	
27	Wu Chia-ying	Chinese Taipei	94	92	98	284	95	97	96	288	572	
28	Golnoush Sebghatollahi	Iran	98	98	95	291	93	98	90	281	572	
29	Teo Shun Xie	Singapore	95	97	94	286	96	94	95	285	571	
30	Chen Ying	China	96	96	95	287	96	88	99	283	570	
31	Elena Galiabovitch	Australia	93	95	97	285	98	94	92	284	569	
32	Tanyaporn Prucksakorn	Thailand	92	95	95	282	95	95	96	286	568	
33	Enkelejda Shehu	United States	93	96	96	285	91	93	98	282	567	
34	Akiko Sato	Japan	94	94	94	282	96	92	95	283	565	
35	Sonia Franquet	Spain	92	97	97	286	90	91	97	278	564	
36	Eleanor Bezzina	Malta	96	94	93	283	96	91	92	279	562	
37	Andrea Pérez Peña	Ecuador	96	89	94	279	94	95	93	282	561	
38	Lynda Kiejko	Canada	88	93	88	269	92	95	96	283	552	
39	Mathilde Lamolle	France	93	99	95	287	99	95	69	263	550	
	Olfa Charni	Tunisia	97	94	98	289	20					DNF

== Semifinal ==
Rank	Athlete	Country	1	2	3	4	5	Total	Tie Break	Notes
1	Anna Korakaki	Greece	5	3	3	4	4	19		Gold Medal Match
2	Monika Karsch	Germany	2	4	4	4	4	18		Gold Medal Match
3	Zhang Jingjing	China	4	5	2	2	4	17		Bronze Medal Match
4	Heidi Diethelm Gerber	Switzerland	3	5	3	3	3	17		Bronze Medal Match
5	Ekaterina Korshunova	Russia	4	4	2	4	2	16		
6	Nino Salukvadze	Georgia	2	4	1	3	4	14		
7	Jo Yong-suk	North Korea	1	4	1	4	2	12		
8	Antoaneta Boneva	Bulgaria	1	1	3	3	3	11		

== Final (medal matches) ==
Rank	Athlete	Country	1	2	3	4	5	6	7	Total	Notes
1st place, gold medalist(s)	Anna Korakaki	Greece	3	4	4	3	2	2	4	8	
2nd place, silver medalist(s)	Monika Karsch	Germany	1	2	3	4	4	3	3	6	
3rd place, bronze medalist(s)	Heidi Diethelm Gerber	Switzerland	4	4	3	4	3	4		8	
4	Zhang Jingjing	China	5	3	2	4	3	2		4	
