= Gymnastics at the European Games – Women's uneven bars =

The European Games were first held in 2015 and are held every four years.

Three medals are awarded: gold for first place, silver for second place, and bronze for third place. Tie breakers have not been used in every year. In the event of a tie between two gymnasts, both names are listed, and the following position (second for a tie for first, third for a tie for second) is left empty because a medal was not awarded for that position. If three gymnastics tied for a position, the following two positions are left empty.

== Medalists ==
| Year | Location | Gold | Silver | Bronze | Ref |
|---|---|---|---|---|---|
| 2015 | (Azerbaijan) Baku | (Russia) Aliya Mustafina | (Germany) Sophie Scheder | (Romania) Andreea Iridon | |
| 2019 | (Belarus) Minsk | (Russia) Angelina Melnikova | (United Kingdom) Becky Downie | (Belarus) Anastasiya Alistratava | |
