= Sambo at the 2019 European Games – Men's 100 kg =

Men's 100 kg at the 2019 European Games
- Venue: Minsk Sports Palace
- Date: 22 June
- Competitors: 8 from 8 nations

Medalists
gold medal	Daviti Loriashvili	Georgia
silver medal	Viktors Reško	Latvia
bronze medal	Alsim Chernoskulov	Russia
bronze medal	Denis Tachii	Moldova

The men's 100 kg sambo event at the 2019 European Games in Minsk was held on 22 June at the Minsk Sports Palace.

== Results ==
Legend

- VH – Total victory – painful hold
- VS – Total victory by decisive superiority
- VW – Total victory by withdrawal

Quarterfinals
Andrii Boloban (UKR)	9^{VS}
Aliaksei Stsepankou (BLR)	1
Alsim Chernoskulov (RUS)	0
Daviti Loriashvili (GEO)	1
Ferenc Sirankó (HUN)	0
Viktors Reško (LAT)	0^{VH}
Antony Segard (FRA)	7
Denis Tachii (MDA)	6

Semifinals
Andrii Boloban (UKR)	0
Daviti Loriashvili (GEO)	3^{VW}
Viktors Reško (LAT)	5
Antony Segard (FRA)	4

Final
Daviti Loriashvili (GEO)	2
Viktors Reško (LAT)	0

Repechage

Repechage
Aliaksei Stsepankou (BLR)	0
Alsim Chernoskulov (RUS)	1

Third place
Alsim Chernoskulov (RUS)	5
Antony Segard (FRA)	1

Repechage
Ferenc Sirankó (HUN)	0
Denis Tachii (MDA)	7^{VS}

Third place
Denis Tachii (MDA)	3
Andrii Boloban (UKR)	2
