= Shooting at the 2020 Summer Olympics – Mixed 10 metre air pistol team =

Olympic shooting event

Mixed 10 metre air pistol team at the Games of the XXXII Olympiad
- Venue: Asaka Shooting Range
- Date: 27 July 2021
- Competitors: 40 from 15 nations
- Teams: 20

Medalists
1st place, gold medalist(s)		Jiang Ranxin; Pang Wei	China
2nd place, silver medalist(s)		Vitalina Batsarashkina; Artem Chernousov	ROC
3rd place, bronze medalist(s)		Olena Kostevych; Oleh Omelchuk	Ukraine

The Mixed 10 meter air pistol team event at the 2020 Summer Olympics took place on 27 July 2021 at the Asaka Shooting Range.

== Schedule ==
All times are Japan Standard Time (UTC+9)

Date	Time	Round
Tuesday, 27 July 2021	9:00; 9:45	Qualification
Tuesday, 27 July 2021	11:00	Bronze medal match
Tuesday, 27 July 2021	11:37	Gold medal match

== Results ==
=== Qualification Stage 1 ===
Rank	Athlete	Country	Series			Total	Notes
Rank	Athlete	Country	1	2	3	Total	Notes
1	Manu Bhaker	India 1	97	94	95	582-26x	Q, OR
1	Saurabh Chaudhary	India 1	98	100	98	582-26x	Q, OR
2	Vitalina Batsarashkina	ROC 1	96	95	98	581-19x	Q
2	Artem Chernousov	ROC 1	98	97	97	581-19x	Q
3	Jiang Ranxin	China 1	97	97	98	581-19x	Q
3	Pang Wei	China 1	97	97	95	581-19x	Q
4	Olena Kostevych	Ukraine	95	98	99	580-20x	Q
4	Oleh Omelchuk	Ukraine	96	99	93	580-20x	Q
5	Zorana Arunović	Serbia	96	96	96	577-17x	Q
5	Damir Mikec	Serbia	97	96	96	577-17x	Q
6	Dina Aspandiyarova	Australia	96	96	93	576-17x	Q
6	Daniel Repacholi	Australia	98	95	98	576-17x	Q
7	Wang Qian	China 2	93	96	94	576-13x	Q
7	He Zhengyang	China 2	98	98	97	576-13x	Q
8	Hanieh Rostamian	Iran	96	97	93	575-18x	Q
8	Javad Foroughi	Iran	95	99	95	575-18x	Q
9	Choo Ga-eun	South Korea 2	97	94	95	575-13x	
9	Jin Jong-oh	South Korea 2	97	96	96	575-13x	
10	Sandra Uptagrafft	United States 2	99	95	96	573-12x	
10	James Hall	United States 2	95	93	95	573-12x	
11	Kim Bo-mi	South Korea 1	94	96	98	573-11x	
11	Kim Mo-se	South Korea 1	94	96	95	573-11x	
12	Carina Wimmer	Germany	94	92	95	571-19x	
12	Christian Reitz	Germany	95	99	96	571-19x	
13	Tsolmonbaataryn Anudari	Mongolia	93	95	90	571-15x	
13	Enkhtaivany Davaakhüü	Mongolia	99	98	96	571-15x	
14	Laina Pérez	Cuba	93	92	95	568- 9x	
14	Jorge Grau	Cuba	96	94	98	568- 9x	
15	Margarita Chernousova	ROC 2	93	94	89	566-19x	
15	Anton Aristarkhov	ROC 2	96	95	99	566-19x	
16	Alexis Lagan	United States 1	93	91	94	565-17x	
16	Nick Mowrer	United States 1	95	95	97	565-17x	
17	Yashaswini Singh Deswal	India 2	95	95	91	564-10x	
17	Abhishek Verma	India 2	92	94	97	564-10x	
18	Radwa Abdel Latif	Egypt	93	93	96	563-11x	
18	Samy Abdel Razek	Egypt	91	96	94	563-11x	
19	Olfa Charni	Tunisia	92	93	92	561-15x	
19	Ala Al-Othmani	Tunisia	98	93	93	561-15x	
20	Satoko Yamada	Japan	91	94	92	559-11x	
20	Kojiro Horimizu	Japan	94	95	93	559-11x	

=== Qualification Stage 2 ===
Rank	Athlete	Country	Series		Total	Notes
Rank	Athlete	Country	1	2	Total	Notes
1	Jiang Ranxin	China 1	97	95	387-10x	QG
1	Pang Wei	China 1	97	98	387-10x	QG
2	Vitalina Batsarashkina	ROC 1	97	95	386-15x	QG
2	Artem Chernousov	ROC 1	96	98	386-15x	QG
3	Olena Kostevych	Ukraine	97	98	386-13x	QB
3	Oleh Omelchuk	Ukraine	97	94	386-13x	QB
4	Zorana Arunović	Serbia	97	96	384-11x	QB
4	Damir Mikec	Serbia	95	96	384-11x	QB
5	Hanieh Rostamian	Iran	92	94	382-13x	
5	Javad Foroughi	Iran	96	100	382-13x	
6	Wang Qian	China 2	95	95	380-12x	
6	He Zhengyang	China 2	97	93	380-12x	
7	Manu Bhaker	India	92	94	380-11x	
7	Saurabh Chaudhary	India	96	98	380-11x	
8	Dina Aspandiyarova	Australia	94	95	380-11x	
8	Daniel Repacholi	Australia	95	96	380-11x	

=== Finals ===
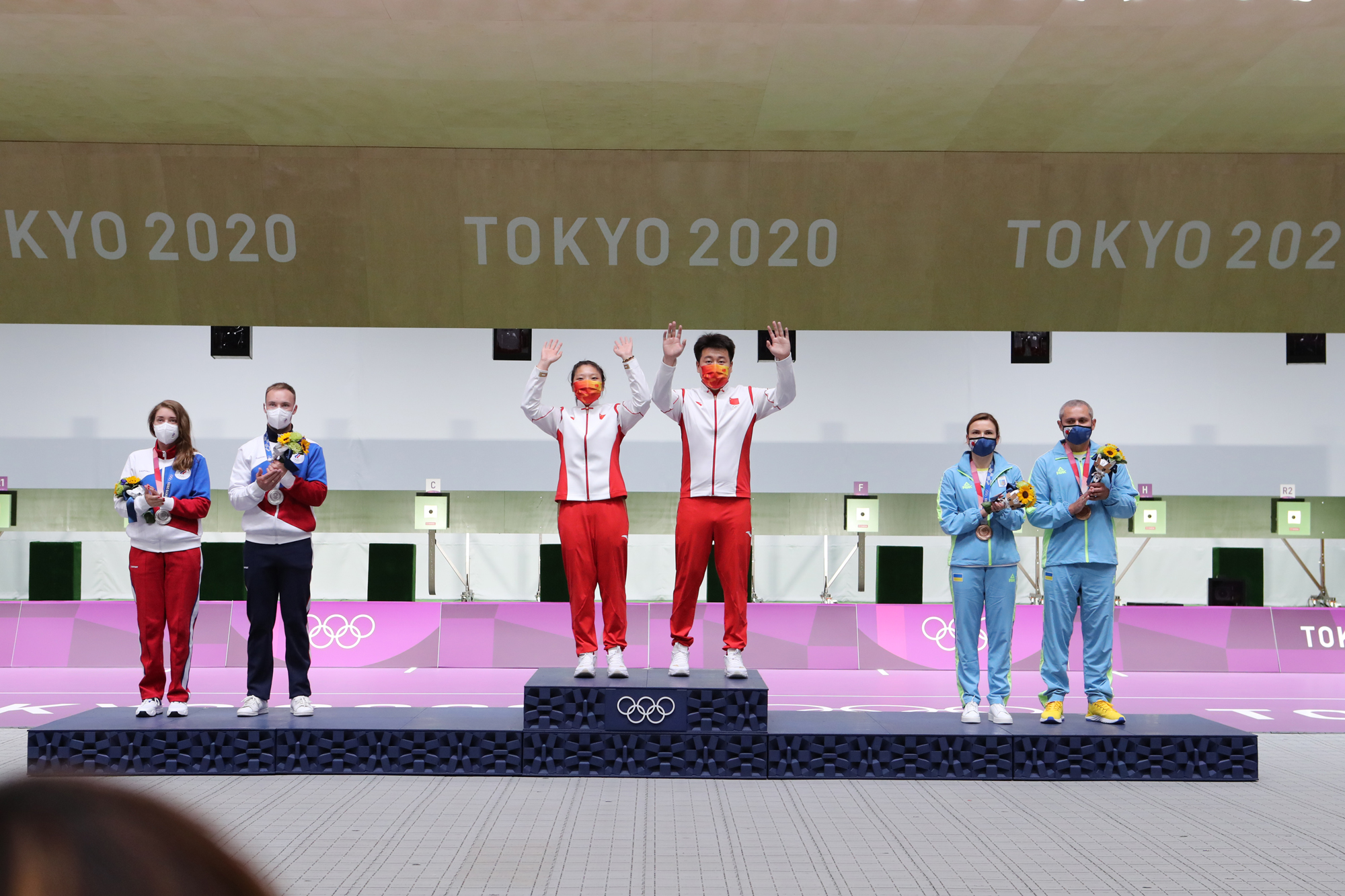
Victory ceremony

Rank	Athletes	Country	Total
Gold medal match
1st place, gold medalist(s)	Jiang Ranxin; Pang Wei	China 1	16
2nd place, silver medalist(s)	Vitalina Batsarashkina; Artem Chernousov	ROC 1	14
Bronze medal match
3rd place, bronze medalist(s)	Olena Kostevych; Oleh Omelchuk	Ukraine	16
4	Zorana Arunović; Damir Mikec	Serbia	12
