= Cycling at the 2019 European Games – Men's 1 km time trial =

Men's 1 km time trial at the 2019 European Games
- Venue: Minsk Velodrome
- Date: 29 June
- Competitors: 14 from 9 nations
- Winning time: 1:00.606

Medalists
| gold medal | Tomáš Bábek | Czech Republic |
| silver medal | Francesco Lamon | Italy |
| bronze medal | Krzysztof Maksel | Poland |

The men's 1 km time trial competition at the 2019 European Games was held at the Minsk Velodrome on 29 June 2019.

== Results ==
=== Qualifying ===
The top 8 riders qualified for the final.

| Rank | Name | Nation | Time | Behind | Notes |
|---|---|---|---|---|---|
| 1 | Francesco Lamon | Italy | 1:00.794 | | Q |
| 2 | Tomáš Bábek | Czech Republic | 1:01.037 | +0.243 | Q |
| 3 | Krzysztof Maksel | Poland | 1:01.185 | +0.391 | Q |
| 4 | Roy van den Berg | Netherlands | 1:01.459 | +0.665 | Q |
| 5 | Uladzislau Novik | Belarus | 1:01.524 | +0.730 | Q |
| 6 | Robin Wagner | Czech Republic | 1:01.611 | +0.817 | Q |
| 7 | Alexander Sharapov | Russia | 1:01.682 | +0.888 | Q |
| 8 | Sam Ligtlee | Netherlands | 1:01.918 | +1.124 | Q |
| 9 | José Moreno | Spain | 1:02.014 | +1.220 | |
| 10 | Davide Boscaro | Italy | 1:02.390 | +1.596 | |
| 11 | Alejandro Martínez | Spain | 1:03.137 | +2.343 | |
| 12 | Andrei Lukashevich | Belarus | 1:03.980 | +3.186 | |
| 13 | Tuur Dens | Belgium | 1:04.068 | +3.274 | |
| 14 | Vladyslav Denysenko | Ukraine | 1:05.901 | +5.107 | |

=== Final ===
| Rank | Name | Nation | Time | Behind | Notes |
|---|---|---|---|---|---|
| 1st place, gold medalist(s) | Tomáš Bábek | Czech Republic | 1:00.606 | | |
| 2nd place, silver medalist(s) | Francesco Lamon | Italy | 1:01.152 | +0.546 | |
| 3rd place, bronze medalist(s) | Krzysztof Maksel | Poland | 1:01.351 | +0.745 | |
| 4 | Sam Ligtlee | Netherlands | 1:01.501 | +0.895 | |
| 5 | Uladzislau Novik | Belarus | 1:01.512 | +0.906 | |
| 6 | Roy van den Berg | Netherlands | 1:01.587 | +0.981 | |
| 7 | Robin Wagner | Czech Republic | 1:01.723 | +1.117 | |
| 8 | Alexander Sharapov | Russia | 1:02.528 | +1.922 | |
