= Sandra Reitz =

German sport shooter (born 1984)

Personal information
- Nationality: German
- Born: 12 August 1984 (age 41) Germany

Sport
- Country: Germany
- Sport: Shooting
- Events: 10 meter air pistol; 25 meter pistol
- Club: SV Hubertus Hüttengesäß
Medal record
Women's shooting
Representing Germany
European Games
Gold medal – first place	2023 Kraków–Małopolska	10 m air pistol team
Bronze medal – third place	2023 Kraków-Małopolska	25 m pistol team
Bronze medal – third place	2019 Minsk	10 m air pistol mixed team

Sandra Reitz (born 12 August 1984) is a German sport shooter and World Champion.
