= Ekaterina Korshunova =

Russian sport shooter (born 1988)

Personal information
- Nationality: Russian
- Born: 24 May 1988 (age 38)
- Height: 1.61 m (5 ft 3 in)
- Weight: 69 kg (152 lb)

Sport
- Country: Russia
- Sport: Shooting
Medal record
Women's Shooting
Representing Russia
European Games
| Bronze medal – third place | 2015 Baku | Mixed 10 m air pistol |
European Championships
| Gold medal – first place | 2018 Győr | Pistol team |

Ekaterina Viktorovna Korshunova (Russian: Екатерина Викторовна Коршунова, born 24 May 1988) is a Russian shooter. She represented her country at the 2016 Summer Olympics.
