= Gymnastics at the 2019 European Games – Women's uneven bars =

The women's artistic gymnastics uneven bars final at the 2019 European Games was held at the Minsk Arena on June 30.

== Qualification ==
Qualification took place on June 27. Becky Downie from Great Britain qualified in first, followed by Belgium's Nina Derwael and Anastasia Ilyankova of Russia. Ilyankova withdrew before the final due to an allergic reaction requiring medical attention, and was replaced by teammate Angelina Melnikova.

The reserves were:

1. Diana Varinska (UKR)
2. Bianka Schermann (HUN)
3. Ana Filipa Martins (POR)

== Medalists ==
	Gold	Silver	Bronze
Uneven bars	Angelina Melnikova (RUS)	Becky Downie (GBR)	Anastasiya Alistratava (BLR)

== Results ==
Oldest and youngest competitors

	Name	Country	Date of birth	Age
Youngest	Anastasiya Alistratava	Belarus	October 16, 2003	15 years, 8 months and 14 days
Oldest	Becky Downie	Great Britain	January 24, 1992	27 years, 5 months and 6 days

Rank	Gymnast	D Score	E Score	Pen.	Total
1st place, gold medalist(s)	Angelina Melnikova (RUS)	6.100	8.366		14.466
2nd place, silver medalist(s)	Becky Downie (GBR)	6.300	8.100		14.400
3rd place, bronze medalist(s)	Anastasiya Alistratava (BLR)	5.900	8.333		14.233
4	Nina Derwael (BEL)	6.500	7.433		13.933
5	Naomi Visser (NED)	5.700	7.766		13.466
6	Lorette Charpy (FRA)	5.800	7.066		12.866
