= Monika Karsch =

German sport shooter (born 1982)

Personal information
- Nationality: German
- Born: 22 December 1982 (age 43) Regensburg, Bavaria, West Germany
- Height: 1.58 m (5 ft 2 in)
- Weight: 53 kg (117 lb)
- Website: monika-karsch.de

Sport
- Country: Germany
- Sport: Shooting
- Event: Air pistol
- Club: HSG Regensburg
Medal record
Olympic Games
Silver medal – second place	2016 Rio de Janeiro	25 m pistol
World Championships
Bronze medal – third place	2018 Changwon	25 m pistol team
European Games
Gold medal – first place	2015 Baku	10 m air pistol mixed team
Silver medal – second place	2019 Minsk	25 m standard pistol mixed team
Bronze medal – third place	2015 Baku	25 m pistol
European Championships
Gold medal – first place	2017 Baku	25 m pistol
Gold medal – first place	2017 Baku	25 m pistol team
Gold medal – first place	2019 Osijek	10 m pistol team
Gold medal – first place	2019 Bologna	25 m pistol
Gold medal – first place	2019 Bologna	25 m pistol team
Gold medal – first place	2019 Bologna	25 m standard pistol mixed team
Gold medal – first place	2021 Osijek	25 m pistol team
Gold medal – first place	2022 Wrocław	25 m pistol team
Silver medal – second place	2013 Osijek	25 m pistol team
Silver medal – second place	2014 Moscow	10 m pistol
Silver medal – second place	2014 Moscow	10 m pistol team
Silver medal – second place	2018 Győr	10 m pistol team
Silver medal – second place	2021 Osijek	25 m pistol
Silver medal – second place	2025 Osijek	10 m pistol team
Bronze medal – third place	2013 Osijek	25 m pistol
Bronze medal – third place	2020 Wrocław	10 m pistol team

Monika Karsch (born 22 December 1982) is a German shooter and Olympian. She represented her country at the 2016 Summer Olympics and won the silver medal in Women's 25 metre pistol.

In 2015, she won the sport pistol event at the CISM World Military Games in Mungyeong, South Korea.

At the 2021 European Championships in Osijek, Karsch took silver in the women's 25 m pistol, narrowly losing to French shooter Mathilde Lamolle.

At the 2022 European Championships, she won the 25m Pistol Women's team title with Doreen Vennekamp and Michelle Skeries.
