= Piotr Daniluk =

Polish sports shooter (born 1982)

Personal information
- Born: 15 January 1982 (age 44) Gdynia, Poland

Sport
- Sport: Sports shooting

Piotr Daniluk (born 15 January 1982) is a Polish sports shooter. He competed in the men's 10 metre air pistol event at the 2016 Summer Olympics.
