= Vitalina Batsarashkina =

Russian sports shooter (born 1996)

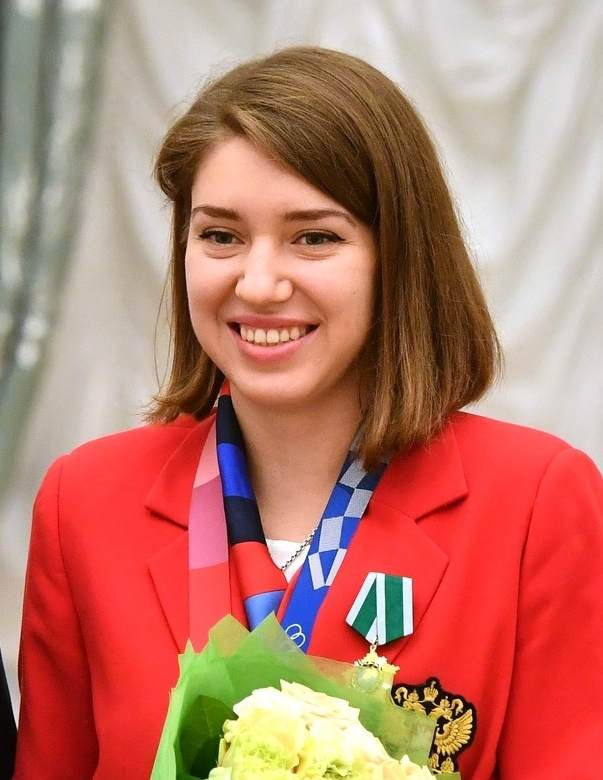
- Batsarashkina in 2021

Personal information
- Full name: Vitalina Igorevna Batsarashkina
- Nationality: Russian
- Born: 1 October 1996 (age 29) Omsk, Russia
- Education: Siberian State University of Physical Education and Sport
- Height: 1.62 m (5 ft 4 in)
- Weight: 58 kg (128 lb)

Sport
- Country: Russia
- Sport: Shooting
- Event: Air pistol
- Club: Dynamo
- Coached by: Natalia Kudrina; Valentin Kudrin
Medal record
Representing (Russia) ROC
Olympic Games
Gold medal – first place	2020 Tokyo	10 m air pistol
Gold medal – first place	2020 Tokyo	25 m pistol
Silver medal – second place	2020 Tokyo	10 m air pistol mixed
Representing Russia
Olympic Games
Silver medal – second place	2016 Rio de Janeiro	10 m air pistol
World Championships
Gold medal – first place	2018 Changwon	10 m air pistol mixed
Silver medal – second place	2018 Changwon	25 m pistol
Bronze medal – third place	2018 Changwon	10 m air pistol team
European Games
Gold medal – first place	2019 Minsk	10 m air pistol mixed
European Championships
Gold medal – first place	2015 Arnhem	10 m air pistol team
Gold medal – first place	2016 Győr	10 m air pistol team
Gold medal – first place	2018 Győr	10 m air pistol team
Gold medal – first place	2020 Wrocław	10 m air pistol mixed
Gold medal – first place	2021 Osijek	10 m air pistol mixed
Silver medal – second place	2017 Maribor	10 m air pistol mixed
Silver medal – second place	2019 Osijek	10 m air pistol mixed
Silver medal – second place	2021 Osijek	10 m air pistol
Silver medal – second place	2021 Osijek	10 m air pistol team
Bronze medal – third place	2015 Arnhem	10 m air pistol mixed
Bronze medal – third place	2017 Maribor	10 m air pistol team
Bronze medal – third place	2019 Osijek	10 m air pistol team
Bronze medal – third place	2021 Osijek	25 m air pistol

Vitalina Igorevna Batsarashkina (Russian: Виталина Игоревна Бацарашкина, IPA: [vʲɪtɐˈlʲinə bətsɐˈraʂkʲɪnə]; born 1 October 1996) is a Russian sports shooter. She is a two-times Olympic champion and two-times Olympic silver medalist. At the 2020 Summer Olympics she became the first female shooter to win three medals at the same Olympic Games. At the previous Olympic Games she was placed second in 10 m air pistol. Besides that, she also won gold, silver and bronze medals at the 2018 World Championships. She is a Merited Master of Sports of Russia.

== Sports career ==
=== Early career ===
Batsarashkina had a more masculine upbringing: She did not like dresses, painted walls, was friends with boys, liked going hunting with their grandpas. Her wish was to become a lifesaver for the Ministry of Emergency Situations. She started fishing aged 6 and driving UAZs at 12. Her father was a police officer, one grandfather was a professional hunter, and the other was a career military officer. By the age of 10, she had already learned basics of shooting from them and had her own rifle. However, she preferred pistol in her later career. She took up sports shooting at age 12, coached by Natalia Kudrina.

=== International career ===
In international events, Batsarashkina participates in the 10 m and 25 m pistol disciplines. Her first notable international success was at the 2014 European Junior Championships in Moscow, reaching the third place in the 10 m air pistol event and collecting 179.2 points in the final. In the same year and in the same discipline she finished second at the World Junior Championships in Granada, collecting 198.2 points in the final. In 2015, Batsarashkina won gold at the Junior World Cup in Suhl, progressing to 200.2 points in the 10 m pistol final. She also won silver in the 25 m final, winning one point. She got another gold medal at the European Junior Championships in Maribor, now in the 25 m event, collecting seven points. At the 2015 ISSF World Cup in Gabala, she finished second in the 25 m event with one point at the end.

Batsarashkina participated at the 2016 Summer Olympics. She qualified to the final with the best result (390), but failed to win gold as Chinese Zhang Mengxue finished with an Olympic record. With that said, Batsarashkina won her first silver medal in the women's 10 metre air pistol event.

She won her first gold medal at the 10 m European Championships in Győr, in the team event. Before that she also won medals at the 10 m European Championships in Maribor, in the mixed team and team event. At the 2018 ISSF World Shooting Championships, the Russian collected gold, silver and bronze medal in the mixed 10 m air pistol, 25 m pistol and 10 m team air pistol event. In the mixed event she partnered with Artem Chernousov, who was also her partner in the European Championships.

She then participated at the 2019 European Games, the 2nd edition of that tournament, held in Minsk, Belarus. While finishing fourth in both pistol events (10 m and 25 m), Batsarashkina and Chernousov claimed Russia's first gold medal. At the 2020 European 10 m Events Championships, she also finished fourth in the individual event. In the team event, she and her teammates finished on the fifth position after qualifying as the second best team. However, she and Chernousov again won a gold medal, once again defeating their previous opponents Zorana Arunovic and Damir Mikec.

In the 2021 season, the Russian claimed four medals at the 2021 European Shooting Championships, one of which was a gold medal, which they won after defeating the Serbs a third time in their career. In the individual events, 10 m and 25 m, she won silver and bronze respectively. She took another silver medal in the 10 m team event.

Batsarashkina won two gold medals, in the 10 m and 25 m air pistol events, at the 2020 Olympics, both times with an Olympic record, and a silver medal with Chernousov, becoming the first shooter to win three medals at the same Olympic Games. For her achievements at the 2020 Olympics, she received more than 21 million rubles from the Russian federal and regional budgets.

== Personal life ==
Batsarashkina is married to Ivan Ilyinykh, a former sports rifler from Orenburg whom she met at the 2014 Nationals. In 2015, after retiring from professional sports, he moved to Omsk. They announced their marriage in 2021 after several delays.
