= Heidi Diethelm Gerber =

Swiss sport shooter (born 1969)

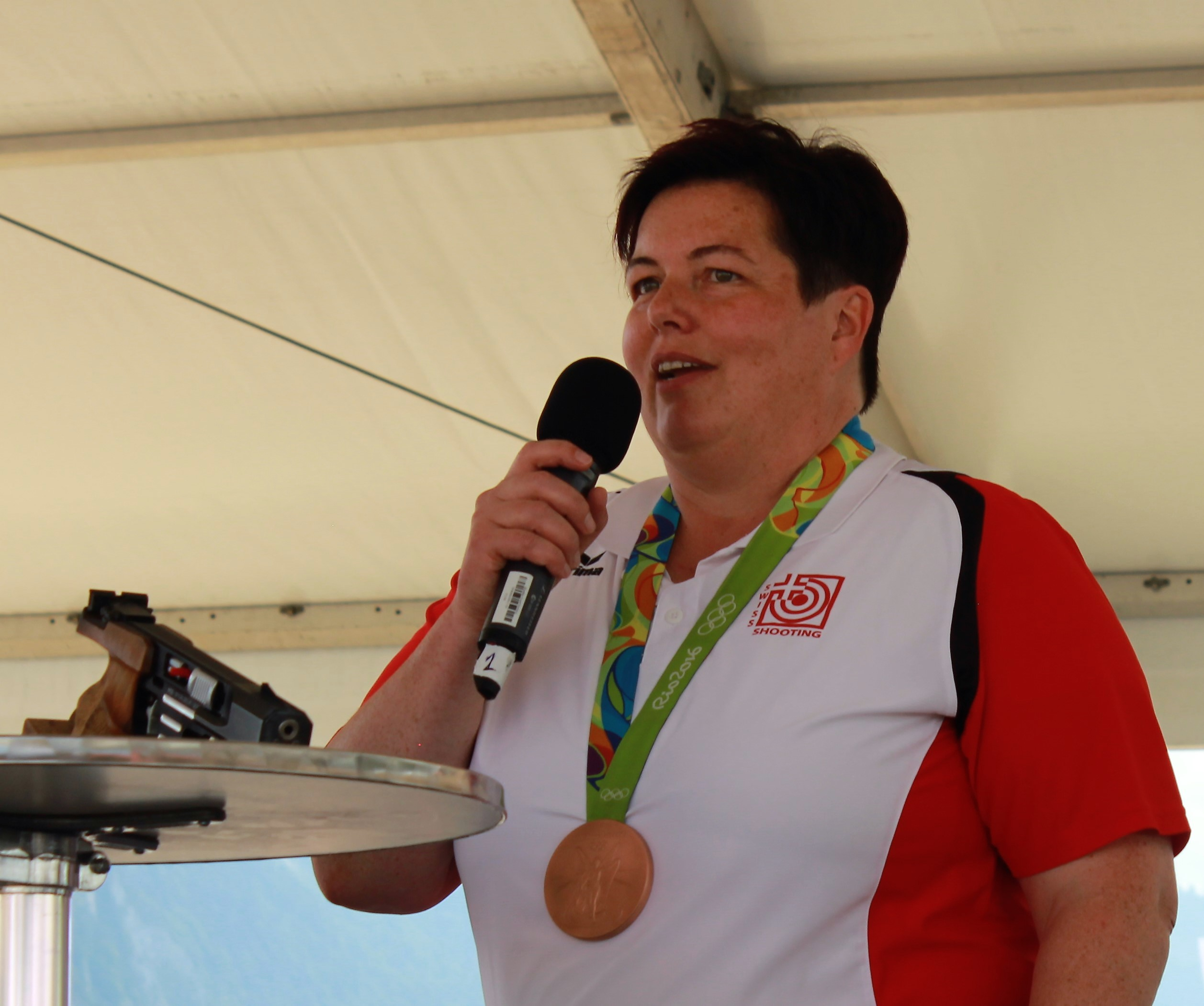

Personal information
- Born: 20 March 1969 (age 57)

Sport
- Sport: Sports shooting
Medal record
Women's shooting
Representing Switzerland
Olympic Games
Bronze medal – third place	2016 Rio de Janeiro	Women's 25 m pistol
European Games
Gold medal – first place	2015 Baku	Women's 25 m pistol
Silver medal – second place	2019 Minsk	Women's 25 m pistol

Heidi Diethelm Gerber (born 20 March 1969 in Münsterlingen) is a Swiss female sport shooter. At the 2012 Summer Olympics, she competed in the Women's 10 metre air pistol and the Women's 25 metre pistol. She finished in 35th in the 10 metre air pistol event and in 29th in the 25 metre event. At the 2016 Summer Olympics she won the bronze medal in the 25 metre pistol and was 35th in the 10 metre air pistol.
