= Lauris Strautmanis =

Latvian sport shooter (born 1995)

Personal information
- Born: 5 June 1995 (age 31) Tukums, Latvia

Sport
- Country: Latvia
- Sport: Sport shooting
Medal record
Men's sport shooting
Representing Latvia
World Championships
Gold medal – first place	2026 Doha	25 m standard pistol team
Silver medal – second place	2023 Baku	50 m pistol
European Games
Silver medal – second place	2019 Minsk	50 m pistol mixed team
Bronze medal – third place	2019 Minsk	10 m air pistol
European Championships
Gold medal – first place	2025 Châteauroux	25 m Standard Pistol
Silver medal – second place	2022 Hamar	10 m pistol team
Silver medal – second place	2022 Wrocław	50 m pistol open
Silver medal – second place	2025 Châteauroux	25 m Standard Pistol Team
Silver medal – second place	2026 Osijek	25 m Standard Pistol
Bronze medal – third place	2017 Baku	50 m pistol

Lauris Strautmanis (born 5 June 1995) is a Latvian sport shooter. He won the bronze medal in the men's 10 metre air pistol event at the 2019 European Games held in Minsk, Belarus. He also won the silver medal in the mixed team 50 metre pistol event, alongside Agate Rašmane. In 2015, he also represented Latvia at the European Games held in Baku, Azerbaijan. He was also the flagbearer for Latvia during the opening ceremony of the 2015 European Games.
