= Artem Chernousov =

Russian sport shooter (born 1996)

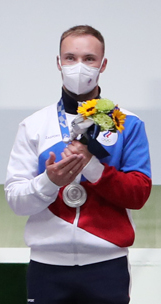

Personal information
- Full name: Artem Anatolyevich Chernousov
- National team: Russia
- Born: January 10, 1996 (age 30) Irkutsk, Russia

Sport
- Country: Russia
- Sport: Shooting
- Event: Air pistol
- Club: SSOR "Priangarye"
Medal record
Representing (Russia) ROC
Olympic Games
Silver medal – second place	2020 Tokyo	10 m air pistol mixed
Representing Russia
World Championships
Gold medal – first place	2018 Changwon	10 m air pistol mixed
Silver medal – second place	2018 Changwon	10 m air pistol
Bronze medal – third place	2018 Changwon	10 m air pistol team
European Games
Gold medal – first place	2019 Minsk	10 m air pistol
Gold medal – first place	2019 Minsk	10 m air pistol mixed
Gold medal – first place	2019 Minsk	50 m pistol mixed
European Championships
Gold medal – first place	2017 Maribor	10 m air pistol team
Gold medal – first place	2018 Győr	10 m air pistol mixed
Gold medal – first place	2020 Wrocław	10 m air pistol
Gold medal – first place	2020 Wrocław	10 m air pistol team
Gold medal – first place	2020 Wrocław	10 m air pistol mixed
Gold medal – first place	2021 Osijek	10 m air pistol team
Gold medal – first place	2021 Osijek	10 m air pistol mixed
Silver medal – second place	2018 Győr	10 m air pistol
Silver medal – second place	2019 Osijek	10 m air pistol mixed
Bronze medal – third place	2019 Osijek	10 m air pistol team
Bronze medal – third place	2021 Osijek	25 m standard pistol

Artem Anatolyevich Chernousov (Russian: Артём Анатольевич Черноусов, IPA: [ɐrˈtʲɵm tɕɪrnɐˈusəf]; born 10 January 1996) is a Russian sport shooter.

He participated at the 2018 ISSF World Shooting Championships.
