= Tsotne Machavariani =

Georgian sport shooter

Personal information
- Born: 26 September 1997 (age 29) Tbilisi, Georgia
- Height: 180 cm (5 ft 11 in)
- Weight: 74 kg (163 lb)

Sport
- Sport: Pistol shooting
- Club: N. Salukvazde Club
- Coached by: Nino Salukvadze

Tsotne Machavariani (Georgian: ცოტნე მაჭავარიანი, born 26 September 1997) is a pistol shooter from Georgia. In 2016 he placed sixth in the 10 m air pistol event at the European championships.

Machavariani has an elder sister Nino; his father Gocha Machavariani is an officer with the Ministry of Internal Affairs of Georgia. Tsotne is trained by his mother Nino Salukvadze, who has competed in pistol shooting in every Olympics since 1988. Machavariani and his mother competed together as a team at the 2015 European Games and placed 14th. In 2016 they become the first mother and son to qualify for the same Olympics.
