= Anton Aristarkhov =

Russian sport shooter

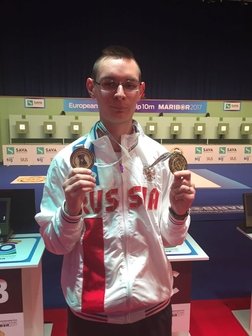
- Anton Aristarkhov

Personal information
- Native name: Антон Андреевич Аристархов
- Full name: Anton Andreevich Aristarkhov
- Nationality: Russian
- Born: 11 February 1999 (age 27) Noginsk, Russia
- Home town: Noginsk, Russia
- Education: Voronezh State Institute of Physical Education
- Years active: 2013–present
- Height: 185 cm (6 ft 1 in)
- Weight: 69 kg (152 lb)

Sport
- Country: Russia
- Sport: Sports shooting
- Event: 10 m air pistol
- Coached by: Aliona Pikunova
Medal record
Shooting
World Championships
Gold medal – first place	2026 Doha	50 m pistol
Bronze medal – third place	2025 Cairo	50 m pistol
European Championships
Gold medal – first place	2020 Wrocław	10 m air pistol team
Gold medal – first place	2021 Osijek	10 m air pistol team
Gold medal – first place	2026 Yerevan	10 m air pistol
Bronze medal – third place	2019 Bologna	50 m pistol team

Anton Andreevich Aristarkhov (Russian: Антон Андреевич Аристархов; born 11 February 1999) is a Russian sports shooter who participates in pistol events.

He represented the Russian Olympic Committee at the 2020 Summer Olympics and finished 15th in the Mixed 10 metre air pistol team along with Margarita Chernousova.

== Results ==
=== Olympic games ===
Event	2020
10 metre air pistol mixed team	15th

=== European championships ===
Event	2019	2020	2021	2022	2023	2024	2025
10 metre air pistol	—	15th	6th	—	—	—	9th
10 metre air pistol team	—	1st	1st	—	—	—	—
10 metre air pistol mixed team	—	11th	28th	—	—	—	—
50 metre pistol	19th	—	—	—	—	—	—
50 metre pistol team	3rd	—	—	—	—	—	—
50 metre pistol mixed team	5th	—	—	—	—	—	—
