= Margarita Chernousova =

Russian sport shooter (born 1996)

Personal information
- Full name: Margarita Sergeyevna Lomova
- Nationality: (Russia) Russian
- Born: 24 March 1996 (age 30) Novokuznetsk, Kemerovo Oblast, Russia
- Height: 1.72 m (5 ft 8 in)
- Weight: 60 kg (132 lb)

Sport
- Country: Russia
- Sport: Shooting
- Event: Air pistol
- Club: CSKA Moscow
Medal record
World Championships
Bronze medal – third place	2018 Changwon	10 m team
European Games
Gold medal – first place	2019 Minsk	50 m mixed
Summer Youth Olympics
Silver medal – second place	2014 Nanjing	10 m

Margarita Sergeyevna Chernousova (Russian: Маргарита Сергеевна Черноусова, née Lomova (Russian: Ломова); born 24 March 1996) is a Russian sport shooter.

She participated at the 2018 ISSF World Shooting Championships, winning a medal.
