= Agate Rašmane =

Latvian sports shooter (born 1997)

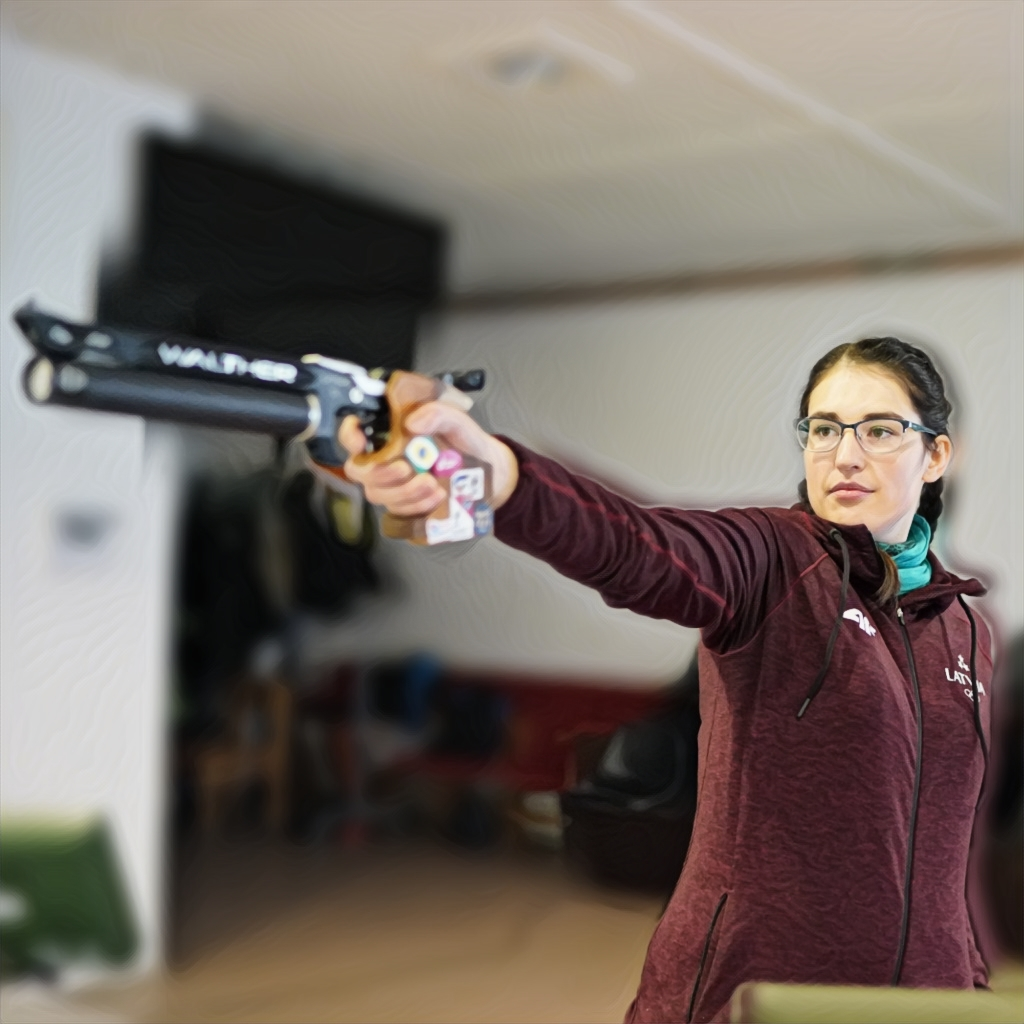

Personal information
- Nationality: Latvian
- Born: 22 August 1997 (age 28) Dobele, Latvia

Sport
- Sport: Sports shooting
Medal record
Women's sport shooting
Representing Latvia
World Championships
| Bronze medal – third place | 2023 Baku | 25 m pistol |
European Games
| Silver medal – second place | 2019 Minsk | Mixed team 50 m pistol |
Representing (International Olympic Committee) Mixed-NOCs
Summer Youth Olympics
| Bronze medal – third place | 2014 Nanjing | Mixed team 10 m air pistol |

Agate Rašmane (born 22 August 1997) is a Latvian sports shooter. She competed in the women's 10 metre air pistol event at the 2020 Summer Olympics.
