= Joana Castelão =

Portuguese sport shooter

Joana Castelão is a Portuguese female sport shooter. At the 2012 Summer Olympics, she competed in the Women's 10 metre air pistol and the women's 25 metre pistol.
