= Samuil Donkov =

Bulgarian sports shooter (born 1983)

Personal information
- Born: 20 June 1983 (age 43)

Sport
- Sport: Sports shooting
Medal record
Men's shooting
Representing Bulgaria
European Games
Bronze medal – third place	2023 Kraków–Małopolska	10 m air pistol mixed team
European Championships
Bronze medal – third place	2026 Osijek	50 m pistol

Samuil Donkov (Bulgarian: Самуил Донков, born 20 June 1983) is a Bulgarian sports shooter. He competed in the men's 10 metre air pistol event at the 2016 Summer Olympics.
