= Klaudia Breś =

Polish sport shooter (born 1994)

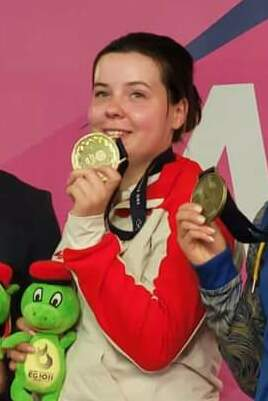
- Klaudia Breś at the 2023 EG

Personal information
- Nationality: Polish
- Born: 22 June 1994 (age 32) Bydgoszcz, Poland
- Height: 1.58 m (5 ft 2 in)
- Weight: 52 kg (115 lb)

Sport
- Country: Poland
- Sport: Shooting
Medal record
Women's shooting
Representing Poland
European Games
Gold medal – first place	2023 Kraków–Małopolska	10 m air pistol
Silver medal – second place	2023 Kraków–Małopolska	25 m pistol team
European Championships
Gold medal – first place	2019 Osijek	10m pistol
Silver medal – second place	2019 Baku	25m pistol
Silver medal – second place	2020 Wrocław	10m pistol team
Silver medal – second place	2022 Wrocław	25m pistol
Bronze medal – third place	2022 Wrocław	25m pistol team

Klaudia Breś (born 22 June 1994) is a Polish sport shooter. She represented her country at the 2016 Summer Olympics. She won gold medal at the 2019 10m European Shooting Championships.
