= Svetlana Medvedeva (sport shooter) =

Russian sport shooter

Personal information
- Nationality: Russian
- Born: 31 August 1992 (age 33) Snezhinsk, Russia
- Height: 1.58 m (5 ft 2 in)
- Weight: 65 kg (143 lb)

Sport
- Country: Russia
- Sport: Shooting
- Event: Air pistol
- Club: CSKA Moscow
Medal record
World Championships
Bronze medal – third place	2018 Changwon	10 m team air pistol

Svetlana Medvedeva (born 31 August 1992) is a Russian sport shooter.

She participated at the 2018 ISSF World Shooting Championships, winning a medal.
