= Latvia at the 2019 European Games =

- IOC code: LAT
- NOC: Latvian Olympic Committee
- Website: www.olimpiade.lv

in Minsk, Belarus 21 – 30 June 2019
- Competitors: 53 in 12 sports
- Medals Ranked 27th: Gold 2 Silver 3 Bronze 2 Total 7

European Games appearances (overview)
- 2015; 2019; 2023; 2027

Latvia competed at the 2019 European Games, in Minsk, Belarus from 21 to 30 June 2019. Latvia has previously competed at the 2015 European Games in Baku, Azerbaijan, where it won 2 medals, including one gold.

== Archery ==
Recurve

Athlete	Event	Ranking round		Round of 64	Round of 32	Round of 16	Quarterfinals	Semifinals	Final / BM	
Athlete	Event	Score	Seed	Opposition Score	Opposition Score	Opposition Score	Opposition Score	Opposition Score	Opposition Score	Rank
Jānis Bružis	Men's individual	619	44	Firsau (BLR)						

== Badminton ==
Athletes	Event	Group stage				Round of 16	Quarterfinals	Semifinals	Final	Rank
Athletes	Event	Opposition Score	Opposition Score	Opposition Score	Rank	Opposition Score	Opposition Score	Opposition Score	Opposition Score	Rank
Ieva Pope	Women's singles	Kjærsfeldt (DEN)	Tomalová (CZE)	Repiská (SVK)						
