= Shooting at the 2019 European Games =

- Venue: Shooting Centre (rifle and pistol); Sporting Club (shotgun)
- Dates: 22–28 June
- Competitors: 314 from 46 nations

Shooting competitions at the 2019 European Games in Minsk were held between 22 and 28 June 2019.

A total of 19 events were contested. The winner in each of the 12 individual events contained a quota place for the 2020 Summer Olympics.

== Qualification ==
The 24 best ranked athletes in the individual events at the European Ranking Lists as of 31 December 2018 will qualify one quota place for their NOCs, respecting the maximum quota places allocation per NOC per event. The participants in mixed team events will be athletes qualified to take part in individual events.

Nation	Men						Women						Mixed							Total athletes
Nation	AR 60	FR 3x40	AP 60	RFP	TR 125	SK 125	AR 60W	R 3x40	AP 60W	SP	TR 125W	SK 125W	AR MIX	RP MIX	AP MIX	SP MIX	FP MIX	TR MIX	SK MIX	Total athletes
Albania			1						1	1					1					2
~~Andorra~~							~~1~~													0
Armenia	1	1					1						1							2
Austria	2	2	1	1			2	2	1	1			2	2	1	1				7
Azerbaijan			1	1		1			1	1		2			1	1			1	6
Belarus	2	2	2		1	1	2	2	2	2			2	2	2	2	2			10
Belgium					2															2
Bosnia and Herzegovina	1																			1
Bulgaria	1	1	1	1					2	2					1	2				5
Croatia	2	1			2		2	2		1			2	1						7
Cyprus					1	2					1	2						1	2	6
Czech Republic	2	2	1	2	2	2	2	2	1	2	2	2	2	2	1	1		2	2	17
Denmark	2	2	1			2	2	2					2	2						9
Estonia			1	1			1	1												2
Finland	1	1			1	2	2	2			2	1	1	1				1	1	9
France	2	2	2	2	2	2	1	2	2	2	2	2	1	~~1~~	2			2	2	20
Georgia			1						2	1					1		1			3
Germany	2	1	2	2	2	1	2	2	2	2	2	2	2	2	2	2		2	1	21
Great Britain			1	2	2	2	1	2			2	2						2	2	8
Greece			1			1			2	1					1	~~1~~	1			4
Hungary	2	2		~~1~~			1	1	2	2		1	1	1						7
Iceland			1			1														2
Ireland					1						1							1		2
Israel	1						1	1					1							2
Italy	2	2	2	2	2	2	2	2	2	2	2	2	2	1	2			2	2	19
Latvia			1						1	1					1	1	1			2
Lithuania	1	1				1			2	2		1							1	5
Luxembourg					1															1
Malta										1	1									2
Moldova			1																	1
Montenegro	1								1											2
Netherlands	1						1	1				1	1							3
North Macedonia			1																	1
Norway	2	2				2	2	2				1	2	2	1				1	9
Poland	1	1	2	2	1	1	2	2	2	2	1	2	1	1	1	2		1	1	14
Portugal			1		1				1	1	2				1	1		1		5
Romania	1						2		1		1	1	1							6
Russia	2	2	2	2	1	2	2	2	2	2	2	1	2	2	2	2	2	1	1	20
San Marino					1						1							1		2
Serbia	2	2	2		1		2	2	2	2			2		2					11
Slovakia	1	1	1		2				1		2	2			1			2		10
Slovenia		1			2		2	2			1			1				1		6
Spain			1		2	1			1	1	2							2		7
Sweden	1	1	1			2	2	1				1	1	1					1	7
Switzerland	2	2	1				2	2	1	1			2	2	1		1			6
Turkey			1	2	2						1	1						1		7
Ukraine	2	2	2	2		1	2	2	2	2	1	1	2	2	2	2	2		1	14
Total: 46 NOCs	40	34	36	22	32	29	41	39	37	35	29	28	33	25	27	17	10	23	19	314

== Medal summary ==
=== Men's events ===
Event	Gold	Silver	Bronze
10 metre air rifle	Sergey Richter; Israel	Sergey Kamenskiy; Russia	Filip Nepejchal; Czech Republic
50 metre rifle three positions	Sergey Kamenskiy; Russia	Yury Shcherbatsevich; Belarus	István Péni; Hungary
10 metre air pistol	Artem Chernousov; Russia	Oleh Omelchuk; Ukraine	Lauris Strautmanis; Latvia
25 metre rapid fire pistol	Oliver Geis; Germany	Jean Quiquampoix; France	Clément Bessaguet; France
Trap	David Kostelecký; Czech Republic	Valerio Grazini; Italy	Aaron Heading; Great Britain
Skeet	Stefan Nilsson; Sweden	Tomáš Nýdrle; Czech Republic	Gabriele Rossetti; Italy

=== Women's events ===
Event	Gold	Silver	Bronze
10 metre air rifle	Laura-Georgeta Coman; Romania	Nina Christen; Switzerland	Nikola Mazurová; Czech Republic
50 metre rifle three positions	Yulia Zykova; Russia	Nikola Mazurová; Czech Republic	Polina Khorosheva; Russia
10 metre air pistol	Zorana Arunović; Serbia	Anna Korakaki; Greece	Antoaneta Boneva; Bulgaria
25 metre pistol	Anna Korakaki; Greece	Heidi Diethelm Gerber; Switzerland	Antoaneta Boneva; Bulgaria
Trap	Silvana Stanco; Italy	Jessica Rossi; Italy	Fátima Gálvez; Spain
Skeet	Diana Bacosi; Italy	Lucie Anastassiou; France	Chiara Cainero; Italy

=== Mixed team events ===
Event	Gold	Silver	Bronze
10 metre air rifle	Sergey Kamenskiy; Yulia Karimova; Russia	Vladimir Maslennikov; Anastasia Galashina; Russia	Filip Nepejchal; Aneta Brabcová; Czech Republic
50 metre rifle three prone	Jan Lochbihler; Nina Christen; Switzerland	Bernhard Pickl; Franziska Peer; Austria	Kirill Grigoryan; Polina Khorosheva; Russia
10 metre air pistol	Artem Chernousov; Vitalina Batsarashkina; Russia	Damir Mikec; Zorana Arunović; Serbia	Christian Reitz; Sandra Reitz; Germany
25 metre standard pistol	Oliver Geis; Doreen Vennekamp; Germany	Christian Reitz; Monika Karsch; Germany	Olena Kostevych; Pavlo Korostylov; Ukraine
50 metre pistol	Artem Chernousov; Margarita Lomova; Russia	Lauris Strautmanis; Agate Rašmane; Latvia	Tsotne Machavariani; Nino Salukvadze; Georgia
Trap	Antonio Bailón; Fátima Gálvez; Spain	Giovanni Pellielo; Jessica Rossi; Italy	Alexey Alipov; Daria Semianova; Russia
Skeet	Gabriele Rossetti; Chiara Cainero; Italy	Riccardo Filippelli; Diana Bacosi; Italy	Jakub Tomeček; Barbora Šumová; Czech Republic

== Medal table ==
* Host nation (Belarus)

Rank	Nation	Gold	Silver	Bronze	Total
1	Russia (RUS)	6	2	3	11
2	Italy (ITA)	3	4	2	9
3	Germany (GER)	2	1	1	4
4	Czech Republic (CZE)	1	2	4	7
5	Switzerland (SUI)	1	2	0	3
6	Greece (GRE)	1	1	0	2
6	Serbia (SRB)	1	1	0	2
8	Spain (ESP)	1	0	1	2
9	Israel (ISR)	1	0	0	1
9	Romania (ROU)	1	0	0	1
9	Sweden (SWE)	1	0	0	1
12	France (FRA)	0	2	1	3
13	Latvia (LAT)	0	1	1	2
13	Ukraine (UKR)	0	1	1	2
15	Austria (AUT)	0	1	0	1
15	Belarus (BLR)*	0	1	0	1
17	Bulgaria (BUL)	0	0	2	2
18	Georgia (GEO)	0	0	1	1
18	Great Britain (GBR)	0	0	1	1
18	Hungary (HUN)	0	0	1	1
Totals (20 entries)		19	19	19	57
