= Shooting at the 2019 European Games – Women's 50 metre rifle three positions =

Women's 50 metre rifle three positions at the 2019 European Games
- Venue: Shooting Centre
- Dates: 27 June
- Competitors: 39 from 22 nations
- Winning score: 461.6

Medalists
| gold medal | Yulia Zykova | Russia |
| silver medal | Nikola Mazurová | Czech Republic |
| bronze medal | Polina Khorosheva | Russia |

The women's 50 metre rifle three positions event at the 2019 European Games in Minsk, Belarus took place on 27 June at the Shooting Centre.

== Schedule ==
All times are local (UTC+3).

| Date | Time | Event |
|---|---|---|
| Thursday, 27 June 2019 | 09:15 | Qualification |
| Thursday, 27 June 2019 | 13:00 | Final |

== Records ==
Prior to this competition, the existing world, European and Games records were as follows.

Qualification
| World Record | Jenny Stene (NOR) | 1185 | Munich, Germany | 28 May 2019 |
| European Record | Jenny Stene (NOR) | 1185 | Munich, Germany | 28 May 2019 |
| Games Record | ISSF Rule changed on 01.01.2018 | — | — | — |
Final
| World Record | Petra Zublasing (ITA) | 464.7 | Baku, Azerbaijan | 19 June 2015 |
| European Record | Petra Zublasing (ITA) | 464.7 | Baku, Azerbaijan | 19 June 2015 |
| Games Record | Petra Zublasing (ITA) | 464.7 | Baku, Azerbaijan | 19 June 2015 |

== Results ==
=== Qualification ===
| Rank | Athlete | Country | Kneeling | Prone | Standing | Total | Notes |
|---|---|---|---|---|---|---|---|
| 1 | Jolyn Beer | Germany | 392 | 395 | 387 | 1174-52x | Q, GR |
| 2 | Sanja Vukašinović | Serbia | 394 | 391 | 383 | 1168-57x | Q |
| 3 | Nikola Mazurová | Czech Republic | 388 | 395 | 385 | 1168-54x | Q |
| 4 | Polina Khorosheva | Russia | 388 | 394 | 384 | 1166-57x | Q |
| 5 | Yulia Zykova | Russia | 392 | 391 | 382 | 1165-50x | Q |
| 6 | Seonaid McIntosh | Great Britain | 390 | 390 | 383 | 1163-60x | Q |
| 7 | Jenny Stene | Norway | 387 | 394 | 381 | 1162-51x | Q |
| 8 | Franziska Peer | Austria | 391 | 390 | 380 | 1161-53x | Q |
| 9 | Natallia Kalnysh | Ukraine | 392 | 388 | 380 | 1160-56x | |
| 10 | Petra Zublasing | Italy | 388 | 391 | 381 | 1160-54x | |
| 11 | Olivia Hofmann | Austria | 391 | 386 | 383 | 1160-43x | |
| 12 | Rikke Ibsen | Denmark | 387 | 388 | 385 | 1160-41x | |
| 13 | Sabrina Sena | Italy | 384 | 385 | 391 | 1160-40x | |
| 14 | Nina Christen | Switzerland | 392 | 384 | 382 | 1158-51x | |
| 15 | Maria Martynova | Belarus | 377 | 392 | 389 | 1158-50x | |
| 16 | Katrine Lund | Norway | 388 | 390 | 378 | 1156-43x | |
| 17 | Agnieszka Nagay | Poland | 383 | 389 | 384 | 1156-42x | |
| 18 | Anzela Voronova | Estonia | 384 | 392 | 380 | 1156-37x | |
| 19 | Petra Lustenberger | Switzerland | 389 | 390 | 376 | 1155-50x | |
| 20 | Jade Bordet | France | 380 | 389 | 385 | 1154-48x | |
| 21 | Tal Engler | Israel | 384 | 386 | 383 | 1153-45x | |
| 22 | Isabella Straub | Germany | 380 | 389 | 384 | 1153-44x | |
| 23 | Romane Matte | France | 385 | 391 | 377 | 1153-42x | |
| 24 | Katarzyna Komorowska | Poland | 387 | 394 | 371 | 1152-48x | |
| 25 | Andrea Arsović | Serbia | 384 | 388 | 380 | 1152-45x | |
| 26 | Snježana Pejčić | Croatia | 387 | 389 | 375 | 1151-45x | |
| 27 | Marta Zeljković | Croatia | 381 | 393 | 376 | 1150-44x | |
| 28 | Katie Gleeson | Great Britain | 389 | 391 | 370 | 1150-44x | |
| 29 | Lea Horváth | Hungary | 382 | 387 | 381 | 1150-41x | |
| 30 | Urška Kuharič | Slovenia | 386 | 384 | 379 | 1149-45x | |
| 31 | Jenna Kuisma | Finland | 385 | 389 | 373 | 1147-40x | |
| 32 | Živa Dvoršak | Slovenia | 384 | 386 | 377 | 1147-34x | |
| 33 | Emmi Hyrkäs | Finland | 386 | 385 | 374 | 1145-44x | |
| 34 | Lotten Johansson | Sweden | 381 | 387 | 376 | 1144-41x | |
| 35 | Aneta Brabcová | Czech Republic | 382 | 386 | 376 | 1144-40x | |
| 36 | Sviatlana Shcherbatsevich | Belarus | 381 | 381 | 382 | 1144-37x | |
| 37 | Anna Ilina | Ukraine | 379 | 385 | 379 | 1143-46x | |
| 38 | Stine Nielsen | Denmark | 380 | 382 | 380 | 1142-40x | |
| 39 | Mandy Mulder | Netherlands | 370 | 379 | 379 | 1128-36x | |

=== Final ===
| Rank | Athlete | Series | | | | | | | | | | | | | Total | Notes |
| Rank | Athlete | Kneeling | | | Prone | | | Standing | | | | | | | Total | Notes |
| Rank | Athlete | 1 | 2 | 3 | 4 | 5 | 6 | 7 | 8 | 9 | 10 | 11 | 12 | 13 | Total | Notes |
|---|---|---|---|---|---|---|---|---|---|---|---|---|---|---|---|---|
| 1st place, gold medalist(s) | Yulia Zykova (RUS) | 50.1 | 49.9 | 52.1 | 51.2 | 51.6 | 51.8 | 51.2 | 51.6 | 9.8 | 10.1 | 10.5 | 9.7 | 10.0 | 459.6 | |
| 1st place, gold medalist(s) | Yulia Zykova (RUS) | 50.1 | 100.0 | 152.1 | 203.3 | 254.9 | 306.7 | 357.9 | 409.5 | 419.3 | 429.4 | 439.9 | 449.6 | 459.6 | 459.6 | |
| 2nd place, silver medalist(s) | Nikola Mazurová (CZE) | 50.9 | 50.4 | 50.0 | 49.9 | 52.2 | 51.0 | 49.4 | 50.8 | 10.0 | 10.0 | 10.1 | 9.8 | 9.4 | 453.9 | |
| 2nd place, silver medalist(s) | Nikola Mazurová (CZE) | 50.9 | 101.3 | 151.3 | 201.2 | 253.4 | 304.4 | 353.8 | 404.6 | 414.6 | 424.6 | 434.7 | 444.5 | 453.9 | 453.9 | |
| 3rd place, bronze medalist(s) | Polina Khorosheva (RUS) | 50.6 | 50.8 | 49.7 | 50.6 | 51.5 | 51.4 | 50.5 | 50.4 | 10.1 | 9.3 | 9.9 | 9.2 | | 440.0 | |
| 3rd place, bronze medalist(s) | Polina Khorosheva (RUS) | 50.6 | 101.4 | 151.1 | 201.7 | 253.2 | 304.6 | 355.1 | 405.5 | 415.6 | 424.9 | 434.8 | 444.0 | | 440.0 | |
| 4 | Sanja Vukašinović (SRB) | 50.0 | 50.9 | 51.2 | 51.2 | 52.5 | 51.7 | 49.4 | 47.7 | 9.6 | 10.1 | 9.4 | | | 433.7 | |
| 4 | Sanja Vukašinović (SRB) | 50.0 | 100.9 | 152.1 | 203.3 | 255.8 | 307.5 | 356.9 | 404.6 | 414.2 | 424.3 | 433.7 | | | 433.7 | |
| 5 | Seonaid McIntosh (GBR) | 51.1 | 49.4 | 50.7 | 51.7 | 51.3 | 51.7 | 50.3 | 48.3 | 9.8 | 9.6 | | | | 423.9 | |
| 5 | Seonaid McIntosh (GBR) | 51.1 | 100.5 | 151.2 | 202.9 | 254.2 | 305.9 | 356.2 | 404.5 | 414.3 | 423.9 | | | | 423.9 | |
| 6 | Franziska Peer (AUT) | 49.1 | 49.3 | 50.0 | 52.6 | 52.1 | 51.7 | 49.7 | 50.8 | 8.7 | | | | | 414.0 | |
| 6 | Franziska Peer (AUT) | 49.1 | 98.4 | 148.4 | 201 | 253.1 | 304.8 | 354.5 | 405.3 | 414.0 | | | | | 414.0 | |
| 7 | Jenny Stene (NOR) | 50.8 | 49.1 | 51.0 | 51.5 | 52.7 | 51.6 | 44.8 | 49.8 | | | | | | 401.3 | |
| 7 | Jenny Stene (NOR) | 50.8 | 99.9 | 150.9 | 202.4 | 255.1 | 306.7 | 351.5 | 401.3 | | | | | | 401.3 | |
| 8 | Jolyn Beer (GER) | 49.8 | 49.2 | 50.6 | 48.9 | 51.1 | 50.4 | 50.2 | 50.1 | | | | | | 400.3 | |
| 8 | Jolyn Beer (GER) | 49.8 | 99.0 | 149.6 | 198.5 | 249.6 | 300.0 | 350.2 | 400.3 | | | | | | 400.3 | |
