= Independent Olympians at the Olympic Games =

Independent Olympians at the Olympics
- IOC code: IOP, IOA, OAR, AIN
- Medals: Gold 31 Silver 51 Bronze 51 Total 133

Summer appearances
- Independent Olympic Participants (1992); Individual Olympic Athletes (2000); Independent Olympic Athletes (2012); Independent Olympic Athletes (2016); ROC (2020); Individual Neutral Athletes (2024)

Winter appearances
- Independent Olympic Participants (2014); Olympic Athletes from Russia (2018); ROC (2022); Individual Neutral Athletes (2026)

Athletes have competed as independent Olympians at the Olympic Games for various reasons, including political transition, international sanctions, suspensions of National Olympic Committees, and compassion. Independent athletes have come from North Macedonia, Timor-Leste, South Sudan and Curaçao following geopolitical changes in the years before the Olympics, from the Federal Republic of Yugoslavia (present-day Serbia and Montenegro) as a result of international sanctions, and from India and Kuwait due to the suspensions of their National Olympic Committees. Starting from 2018, athletes from Russia have competed under a neutral designation for various reasons, mainly mass violations of anti-doping rules and since 2022, the Belarus-assisted invasion of Ukraine.

Apart from Russian athletes who won more than a hundred medals under a neutral designation, medals were won by independent Olympians at the 1992 and 2016 Olympics, both times in shooting. The naming and country code conventions for these independent Olympians have not been consistent. Independent Paralympians have participated at Paralympic Games for the same reasons as independent Olympians.

== Precursors ==
Prior to the 1906 Intercalated Games, entry was not restricted to teams nominated by National Olympic Committees (NOCs). Mixed-nationality teams competed in some team events. Participants in individual events are retrospectively credited to their nationality of the time.

The 1940 Winter Olympics was reassigned to Garmisch-Partenkirchen in spring 1939. In concert with German claims on Czechoslovakia, the organisers refused to recognise the Czechoslovakia NOC; however, they were prepared to allow its athletes to enter under the Olympic flag. In any event, the Games were cancelled because of World War II.

During the Cold War, some athletes who emigrated from Soviet Bloc countries were unable to compete at the Olympics, as their original state's NOC neither wanted them on its own team nor gave them permission to transfer nationality. Some applied to compete as individuals in 1952 and 1956 but were refused.

When Guyana joined the 1976 Olympic boycott, its sprinter James Gilkes asked the IOC to be allowed to compete as an individual, but was refused.

The IOC first made provisions for athletes to compete under the Olympic flag in time for the 1980 Summer Olympics in Moscow. Some NOCs, mostly from Western Europe, wished to attend the Games despite their governments' support for the American-led boycott in protest of the Soviet invasion of Afghanistan. The NOCs hesitated to use national symbols without government approval, so the IOC relaxed this requirement: 14 NOCs competed under the Olympic flag, while three, New Zealand, Spain and Portugal, competed under their respective NOCs' flag.

== 1992 Winter and Summer Olympics ==
=== Independent Olympic Participants ===
During the 1992 Summer Olympics, athletes from the Federal Republic of Yugoslavia and the Republic of Macedonia competed as Independent Olympic participants. Macedonian athletes could not appear under their own flag because their National Olympic Committee (NOC) had not yet been formed. The Federal Republic of Yugoslavia (Serbia and Montenegro) was under United Nations sanctions which prevented the country from taking part in the Olympics. However, individual Yugoslav athletes were allowed to take part as independent Olympic participants. 58 athletes competed as independent Olympic participants, winning three medals.

Medal	Name	Nationality (Note: The athlete's nationality is listed at the time of the competition.)	Games	Sport	Events
Silver	Jasna Šekarić	FR Yugoslavia	1992 Barcelona	Shooting	Women's 10 m air pistol
Bronze	Aranka Binder	FR Yugoslavia	1992 Barcelona	Shooting	Women's 10 m air rifle
Bronze	Stevan Pletikosić	FR Yugoslavia	1992 Barcelona	Shooting	Men's 50 m rifle prone

=== Unified Team ===
The former Soviet Union (except the Baltic states) competed under the Olympic flag at the 1992 Winter and Summer Olympics as the Unified Team.

== 2000 Summer Olympics ==
At the 2000 Summer Olympics, four athletes from East Timor competed as Individual Olympic Athletes during the country's transition to independence.

== 2012 Summer Olympics ==
Four athletes competed as Independent Olympic Athletes at the 2012 Summer Olympics.

After the dissolution of the Netherlands Antilles and subsequent withdrawal of the country's National Olympic Committee, three athletes from the country who qualified for the Games were allowed to compete independently. Several others competed for either Aruba or the Netherlands.

The National Olympic Committee for South Sudan was not established between the formation of that state and the 2012 Olympic qualifying. One athlete from South Sudan, Guor Marial, qualified for the Games and was allowed to compete as an independent.

Athletes from Kuwait were originally allowed to compete as Independent Olympic Athletes as well, because their National Olympic Committee was suspended. However, the NOC was reinstated allowing the athletes to compete under their own flag. Kuwait competed under the Olympic flag at the 2010 Summer Youth Olympics and 2010 Asian Games.

== 2014 Winter Olympics ==
The Indian Olympic Association was suspended from the IOC in December 2012, due to problems with its electoral process. New elections were scheduled for 9 February 2014, two days after the start of the 2014 Winter Olympics. Therefore, the three Indian athletes who qualified for the Games were scheduled to compete as Independent Olympic Participants.

On 8 and 9 February, Shiva Keshavan participated in the luge competition and received 38th place. He would end up being the only athlete to officially compete as an Independent Olympic Participant.

On 11 February 2014, the IOC reinstated the Indian Olympic Association after Narayana Ramachandran, the president of the World Squash Federation, was voted in as the new president of the Indian Olympic Association, allowing the two remaining athletes to compete under the Indian flag rather than as independent athletes. This was the first time such a reinstatement of a NOC occurred as the Olympic Games were underway.

== 2016 Summer Olympics ==
Kuwaiti athletes competed independently, as the Kuwait Olympic Committee was suspended by the International Olympic Committee due to governmental interference. This was the second suspension in five years; the first suspension resulted in Kuwaiti athletes being forced to compete under the Olympic flag as Athletes from Kuwait at the 2010 Asian Games. Fehaid Al-Deehani became the first Independent Olympic Athlete to win a gold medal. Like with some gold medals of the Unified Team at the 1992 Winter and Summer Olympics, the Olympic Hymn was played in the victory ceremony.

Refugees were allowed to compete under the Olympic Flag (one of two delegations to compete under that flag, alongside Kuwaiti IOAs) at the 2016 Summer Olympics, under the label Refugee Olympic Team. Ten athletes from four countries competed for this team.

Due to widespread state-controlled doping in Russia, the International Association of Athletics Federations suspended the All-Russia Athletic Federation in November 2015. As a result, no Russian athlete would be able to compete internationally, including the 2016 Olympics, until the suspension was lifted. The IAAF announced a path for athletes who train outside the Russian system and could prove themselves to be clean, as well as those who have helped in the fight against doping, to be eligible to compete as neutral athletes at the 2016 Olympics. Two athletes, Darya Klishina and Yuliya Stepanova were initially cleared for competition, as Independent Athletes.

Although Yulia Stepanova was cleared by IAAF because of her revelations regarding Russia's systemic doping program, and the IOC's recognition of her "contribution to the protection and promotion of clean athletes", she was banned by the IOC in line with the decision to ban all Russian athletes with previous doping convictions. The IOC also rejected the suggestion that 'neutral' athletes could compete outside of national selection. Klishina was subsequently confirmed as competing under Russian colours, the country's only competitor in athletics at the 2016 Olympics.

Medal	Name	Nationality	Games	Sport	Events
Gold	Fehaid Al-Deehani	Kuwait	2016 Rio de Janeiro	Shooting	Men's double trap
Bronze	Abdullah Al-Rashidi	Kuwait	2016 Rio de Janeiro	Shooting	Men's skeet

== 2018 Winter Olympics ==
On 5 December 2017, the IOC announced that Russia would be banned from the 2018 Winter Olympics over its state-sponsored doping program. Russian athletes were allowed to participate under the Olympic flag as "Olympic Athletes from Russia" (OAR) if they were cleared by a panel, which was chaired by Valerie Fourneyron and had representatives from the IOC, the World Anti-Doping Agency, and the Doping Free Sport Unit of the Global Association of International Sports Federations.

Medal	Name	Nationality	Games	Sport	Events
Gold	Alina Zagitova	Russia	2018 Pyeongchang	Figure skating	Ladies' singles
Gold	Russia men's national ice hockey team: Sergei Andronov; Alexander Barabanov; Pavel Datsyuk; Vladislav Gavrikov; Mikhail Grigorenko; Nikita Gusev; Ilya Kablukov; Sergey Kalinin; Kirill Kaprizov; Bogdan Kiselevich; Vasily Koshechkin; Ilya Kovalchuk; Alexey Marchenko; Sergei Mozyakin; Nikita Nesterov; Nikolai Prokhorkin; Igor Shestyorkin; Vadim Shipachyov; Sergei Shirokov; Ilya Sorokin; Ivan Telegin; Vyacheslav Voynov; Egor Yakovlev; Artyom Zub; Andrei Zubarev	Russia	2018 Pyeongchang	Ice hockey	Men's tournament
Silver	Mikhail Kolyada; Evgenia Medvedeva; Alina Zagitova; Evgenia Tarasova; Vladimir Morozov; Natalia Zabiiako; Alexander Enbert; Ekaterina Bobrova; Dmitri Soloviev	Russia	2018 Pyeongchang	Figure skating	Team event
Silver	Nikita Tregubov	Russia	2018 Pyeongchang	Skeleton	Men's
Silver	Aleksandr Bolshunov; Aleksey Chervotkin; Andrey Larkov; Denis Spitsov	Russia	2018 Pyeongchang	Cross-country skiing	Men's 4 × 10 km relay
Silver	Aleksandr Bolshunov; Denis Spitsov	Russia	2018 Pyeongchang	Cross-country skiing	Men's team sprint
Silver	Evgenia Medvedeva	Russia	2018 Pyeongchang	Figure skating	Ladies' singles
Silver	Aleksandr Bolshunov	Russia	2018 Pyeongchang	Cross-country skiing	Men's 50 km classical
Bronze	Semion Elistratov	Russia	2018 Pyeongchang	Short track speed skating	Men's 1500 metres
Bronze	Yulia Belorukova	Russia	2018 Pyeongchang	Cross-country skiing	Women's sprint
Bronze	Aleksandr Bolshunov	Russia	2018 Pyeongchang	Cross-country skiing	Men's sprint
Bronze	Denis Spitsov	Russia	2018 Pyeongchang	Cross-country skiing	Men's 15 km freestyle
Bronze	Natalya Voronina	Russia	2018 Pyeongchang	Speed skating	Women's 5000 m
Bronze	Yulia Belorukova; Anna Nechaevskaya; Natalia Nepryaeva; Anastasia Sedova	Russia	2018 Pyeongchang	Cross-country skiing	Women's 4 × 5 km relay
Bronze	Ilya Burov	Russia	2018 Pyeongchang	Freestyle skiing	Men's aerials
Bronze	Sergey Ridzik	Russia	2018 Pyeongchang	Freestyle skiing	Men's ski cross
Bronze	Andrey Larkov	Russia	2018 Pyeongchang	Cross-country skiing	Men's 50 km classical

== 2020 Summer Olympics ==
Flag of the Russian Olympic Committee

The IOC Refugee Olympic Team competed at the 2020 Summer Olympics in Tokyo, Japan, as independent Olympic participants. Twenty-nine athletes from 12 sports and 18 countries competed for this team. The IOC code was changed to the French acronym "EOR" which stands for Équipe olympique des réfugiés.

Following a decision by the World Anti-Doping Agency (WADA), it was announced that Russia would compete under the acronym "ROC", after the name of the Russian Olympic Committee. In the aftermatch, the IOC announced that the Russian national flag would be substituted by the flag of the Russian Olympic Committee. It would also be allowed to use team uniforms featuring the Russian national colours, the logo of the Russian Olympic Committee and bearing the acronym "ROC".

Medal	Name	Sport	Event	Date
Gold	Vitalina Batsarashkina	Shooting	Women's 10 m air pistol	25 July
Gold	Sofia Pozdniakova	Fencing	Women's sabre	26 July
Gold	Denis Ablyazin; David Belyavskiy; Artur Dalaloyan; Nikita Nagornyy	Gymnastics	Men's artistic team all-around	26 July
Gold	Maksim Khramtsov	Taekwondo	Men's 80 kg	26 July
Gold	Evgeny Rylov	Swimming	Men's 100 m backstroke	27 July
Gold	Lilia Akhaimova; Viktoria Listunova; Angelina Melnikova; Vladislava Urazova	Gymnastics	Women's artistic team all-around	27 July
Gold	Vladislav Larin	Taekwondo	Men's +80 kg	27 July
Gold	Inna Deriglazova; Larisa Korobeynikova; Marta Martyanova; Adelina Zagidullina	Fencing	Women's team foil	29 July
Gold	Evgeny Rylov	Swimming	Men's 200 m backstroke	30 July
Gold	Vitalina Batsarashkina	Shooting	Women's 25 m pistol	30 July
Gold	Olga Nikitina; Sofia Pozdniakova; Sofya Velikaya	Fencing	Women's team sabre	31 July
Gold	Andrey Rublev; Anastasia Pavlyuchenkova	Tennis	Mixed doubles	1 August
Gold	Musa Evloev	Wrestling	Men's Greco-Roman 97 kg	3 August
Gold	Svetlana Kolesnichenko; Svetlana Romashina	Artistic swimming	Women's duet	4 August
Gold	Albert Batyrgaziev	Boxing	Men's featherweight	5 August
Gold	Zaur Uguev	Wrestling	Men's freestyle 57 kg	5 August
Gold	Zaurbek Sidakov	Wrestling	Men's freestyle 74 kg	6 August
Gold	Vlada Chigireva; Marina Goliadkina; Svetlana Kolesnichenko; Polina Komar; Alexandra Patskevich; Svetlana Romashina; Alla Shishkina; Maria Shurochkina	Artistic swimming	Women's team	7 August
Gold	Abdulrashid Sadulaev	Wrestling	Men's freestyle 97 kg	7 August
Gold	Mariya Lasitskene	Athletics	Women's high jump	7 August
Silver	Anastasiia Galashina	Shooting	Women's 10 m air rifle	24 July
Silver	Svetlana Gomboeva; Elena Osipova; Ksenia Perova	Archery	Women's team	25 July
Silver	Inna Deriglazova	Fencing	Women's foil	25 July
Silver	Tatiana Minina	Taekwondo	Women's 57 kg	25 July
Silver	Sofya Velikaya	Fencing	Women's sabre	26 July
Silver	Kliment Kolesnikov	Swimming	Men's 100 m backstroke	27 July
Silver	Vitalina Batsarashkina; Artem Chernousov	Shooting	Mixed 10 m air pistol team	27 July
Silver	Mikhail Dovgalyuk; Ivan Girev; Aleksandr Krasnykh^{[a]} Martin Malyutin; Evgeny Rylov; Mikhail Vekovishchev^{[a]}	Swimming	Men's 4 × 200 m freestyle relay	28 July
Silver	Evgeniia Frolkina; Olga Frolkina; Yulia Kozik; Anastasia Logunova	Basketball	Women's 3x3 tournament	28 July
Silver	Ilia Karpenkov; Kirill Pisklov; Stanislav Sharov; Alexander Zuev	Basketball	Men's 3x3 tournament	28 July
Silver	Vasilisa Stepanova; Elena Oriabinskaia	Rowing	Women's coxless pair	29 July
Silver	Hanna Prakatsen	Rowing	Women's single sculls	30 July
Silver	Elena Osipova	Archery	Women's individual	30 July
Silver	Sergey Bida; Nikita Glazkov; Sergey Khodos; Pavel Sukhov	Fencing	Men's team épée	30 July
Silver	Yulia Zykova	Shooting	Women's 50 m rifle three positions	31 July
Silver	Karen Khachanov	Tennis	Men's singles	1 August
Silver	Anastasia Iliankova	Gymnastics	Women's uneven bars	1 August
Silver	Anton Borodachev; Kirill Borodachev; Vladislav Mylnikov; Timur Safin	Fencing	Men's team foil	1 August
Silver	Aslan Karatsev; Elena Vesnina	Tennis	Mixed doubles	1 August
Silver	Sergey Kamenskiy	Shooting	Men's 50 m rifle three positions	2 August
Silver	Denis Ablyazin	Gymnastics	Men's vault	2 August
Silver	Anzhelika Sidorova	Athletics	Women's pole vault	5 August
Silver	Muslim Gadzhimagomedov	Boxing	Men's heavyweight	6 August
Silver	Viacheslav Krasilnikov; Oleg Stoyanovskiy	Volleyball	Men's beach	7 August
Silver	Dina Averina	Gymnastics	Women's rhythmic individual all-around	7 August
Silver	Russia men's national volleyball team: Denis Bogdan; Valentin Golubev; Ivan Iakovlev; Egor Kliuka; Igor Kobzar; Ilyas Kurkaev; Maksim Mikhaylov; Pavel Pankov; Yaroslav Podlesnykh; Viktor Poletaev; Dmitry Volkov; Artem Volvich	Volleyball	Men's tournament	7 August
Silver	Anastasia Bliznyuk; Anastasia Maksimova; Angelina Shkatova; Anastasia Tatareva; Alisa Tishchenko	Gymnastics	Women's rhythmic group all-around	8 August
Silver	Russia women's national handball team: Vladlena Bobrovnikova; Daria Dmitrieva; Olga Fomina; Polina Gorshkova; Ekaterina Ilina; Victoriya Kalinina; Polina Kuznetsova; Kseniya Makeyeva; Yulia Managarova; Elena Mikhaylichenko; Anna Sedoykina; Anna Sen; Antonina Skorobogatchenko; Anna Vyakhireva; Polina Vedekhina	Handball	Women's tournament	8 August
Bronze	Mikhail Artamonov	Taekwondo	Men's 58 kg	24 July
Bronze	Larisa Korobeynikova	Fencing	Women's foil	25 July
Bronze	Aleksandr Bondar; Viktor Minibaev	Diving	Men's synchronized 10 m platform	26 July
Bronze	Yulia Karimova; Sergey Kamenskiy	Shooting	Mixed 10 m air rifle team	27 July
Bronze	Madina Taimazova	Judo	Women's 70 kg	28 July
Bronze	Nikita Nagornyy	Gymnastics	Men's artistic individual all-around	28 July
Bronze	Kliment Kolesnikov	Swimming	Men's 100 m freestyle	29 July
Bronze	Niyaz Ilyasov	Judo	Men's 100 kg	29 July
Bronze	Angelina Melnikova	Gymnastics	Women's artistic individual all-around	29 July
Bronze	Tamerlan Bashaev	Judo	Men's +100 kg	30 July
Bronze	Yulia Karimova	Shooting	Women's 50 m rifle three positions	31 July
Bronze	Imam Khataev	Boxing	Men's light heavyweight	1 August
Bronze	Andrey Zamkovoy	Boxing	Men's welterweight	1 August
Bronze	Daria Shmeleva; Anastasia Voynova	Cycling	Women's team sprint	2 August
Bronze	Angelina Melnikova	Gymnastics	Women's floor	2 August
Bronze	Sergey Emelin	Wrestling	Men's Greco-Roman 60 kg	2 August
Bronze	Sergey Semenov	Wrestling	Men's Greco-Roman 130 kg	2 August
Bronze	Nikita Nagornyy	Gymnastics	Men's horizontal bar	3 August
Bronze	Gleb Bakshi	Boxing	Men's middleweight	5 August
Bronze	Artur Naifonov	Wrestling	Men's freestyle 86 kg	5 August
Bronze	Zemfira Magomedalieva	Boxing	Women's middleweight	6 August
Bronze	Gulnaz Khatuntseva; Maria Novolodskaya	Cycling	Women's madison	6 August
Bronze	Gadzhimurad Rashidov	Wrestling	Men's freestyle 65 kg	7 August

== 2022 Winter Olympics ==
Similarly to the 2020 Summer Olympics, Russia competed in the 2022 Beijing Games under the "ROC" acronym due to WADA's sanctions.

Medal	Name	Sport	Event	Date
Gold	Alexander Bolshunov	Cross-country skiing	Men's 30 km skiathlon	6 February
Gold	Natalya Nepryayeva; Tatiana Sorina; Veronika Stepanova; Yuliya Stupak	Cross-country skiing	Women's 4 × 5 km relay	12 February
Gold	Alexander Bolshunov; Aleksey Chervotkin; Denis Spitsov; Sergey Ustiugov	Cross-country skiing	Men's 4 × 10 km relay	13 February
Gold	Anna Shcherbakova	Figure skating	Women's singles	17 February
Gold	Alexander Bolshunov	Cross-country skiing	Men's 50 kilometre freestyle	19 February
Silver	Natalya Nepryayeva	Cross-country skiing	Women's 15 km skiathlon	5 February
Silver	Denis Spitsov	Cross-country skiing	Men's 30 km skiathlon	6 February
Silver	Irina Avvakumova; Evgenii Klimov; Irma Makhinia; Danil Sadreev	Ski jumping	Mixed team	7 February
Silver	Alexander Bolshunov	Cross-country skiing	Men's 15 km classical	11 February
Silver	Konstantin Ivliev	Short track speed skating	Men's 500 metres	13 February
Silver	Nikita Katsalapov; Victoria Sinitsina	Figure skating	Ice dance	14 February
Silver	Daniil Aldoshkin; Sergey Trofimov; Ruslan Zakharov	Speed skating	Men's team pursuit	15 February
Silver	Irina Kazakevich; Svetlana Mironova; Uliana Nigmatullina; Kristina Reztsova	Biathlon	Women's relay	16 February
Silver	Alexandra Trusova	Figure skating	Women's singles	17 February
Silver	Ivan Yakimushkin	Cross-country skiing	Men's 50 kilometre freestyle	19 February
Silver	Vladimir Morozov; Evgenia Tarasova	Figure skating	Pair skating	19 February
Silver	Russia men's national ice hockey team: Sergei Andronov; Timur Bilyalov; Andrei Chibisov; Ivan Fedotov; Stanislav Galiev; Mikhail Grigorenko; Arseni Gritsyuk; Nikita Gusev; Pavel Karnaukhov; Artur Kayumov; Artyom Minulin; Nikita Nesterov; Alexander Nikishin; Sergei Plotnikov; Alexander Samonov; Kirill Semyonov; Damir Sharipzyanov; Vadim Shipachyov; Anton Slepyshev; Sergei Telegin; Vladimir Tkachyov; Dmitri Voronkov; Slava Voynov; Egor Yakovlev; Alexander Yelesin	Ice hockey	Men's tournament	20 February
Bronze	Uliana Nigmatullina; Kristina Reztsova; Alexander Loginov; Eduard Latypov	Biathlon	Mixed relay	5 February
Bronze	Anastasia Smirnova	Freestyle skiing	Women's moguls	6 February
Bronze	Aleksandr Galliamov; Nikita Katsalapov; Mark Kondratiuk; Anastasia Mishina; Victoria Sinitsina; ~~Kamila Valieva~~ (DSQ)	Figure skating	Team event	7 February
Bronze	Vic Wild	Snowboarding	Men's parallel giant slalom	8 February
Bronze	Alexander Terentyev	Cross-country skiing	Men's sprint	8 February
Bronze	Tatiana Ivanova	Luge	Women's singles	8 February
Bronze	Semion Elistratov	Short track speed skating	Men's 1500 metres	9 February
Bronze	Eduard Latypov	Biathlon	Men's pursuit	13 February
Bronze	Angelina Golikova	Speed skating	Women's 500 metres	13 February
Bronze	Said Karimulla Khalili; Eduard Latypov; Alexander Loginov; Maxim Tsvetkov	Biathlon	Men's relay	15 February
Bronze	Natalya Nepryayeva; Yuliya Stupak	Cross-country skiing	Women's team sprint	16 February
Bronze	Alexander Bolshunov; Alexander Terentyev	Cross-country skiing	Men's team sprint	16 February
Bronze	Ilya Burov	Freestyle skiing	Men's aerials	16 February
Bronze	Sergey Ridzik	Freestyle skiing	Men's ski cross	18 February
Bronze	Aleksandr Galliamov; Anastasia Mishina	Figure skating	Pair skating	19 February

== 2024 Summer Olympics ==
The final version of the AIN flag assigned by the IOC in March 2024

Both the Russian Olympic Committee and Belarus Olympic Committee were suspended after the Belarus-assisted 2022 Russian invasion of Ukraine. Approved individual Belarusian and Russian athletes were allowed to compete at the 2024 Summer Olympics under the name Individual Neutral Athletes, and the IOC country code AIN from the French athlètes individuels neutres.

Medal	Name	Country	Sport	Event	Date
Gold	Ivan Litvinovich	Belarus	Gymnastics	Men's trampoline	2 August
Silver	Viyaleta Bardzilouskaya	Belarus	Gymnastics	Women's trampoline	2 August
Silver	Yauheni Zalaty	Belarus	Rowing	Men's single sculls	3 August
Silver	Mirra Andreeva; Diana Shnaider	Russia	Tennis	Women's doubles	4 August
Bronze	Yauheni Tsikhantsou	Belarus	Weightlifting	Men's – 102 kg	10 August

== 2026 Winter Olympics ==
The Olympic Committees of Russia and Belarus remained suspended due to the Russian invasion of Ukraine. Thus, individual Russian and Belarusian athletes at the 2026 Winter Games could compete as Individual Neutral Athletes (AIN) under the same conditions as the 2024 Summer Games.

Medal	Name	Country	Sport	Event	Date
Silver	Nikita Filippov	Russia	Ski mountaineering	Men's sprint	19 February

== See also ==
- Independent Paralympians at the Paralympic Games
- List of flag bearers for Independent Olympians at the Olympics
- Refugee Olympic Team at the Olympics
- Russian Olympic Committee athletes at the Olympics
