= Shooting at the 2019 European Games – Mixed team 50 metre rifle prone =

Mixed team 50 metre rifle prone at the 2019 European Games
- Venue: Shooting Centre
- Dates: 25 June
- Competitors: 50 from 16 nations

Medalists
gold medal	Nina Christen; Jan Lochbihler	Switzerland
silver medal	Franziska Peer; Bernhard Pickl	Austria
bronze medal	Polina Khorosheva; Kirill Grigoryan	Russia

The mixed team 50 meter rifle prone event at the 2019 European Games in Minsk, Belarus took place on 25 June at the Shooting Centre.

== Schedule ==
All times are local (UTC+3).

Date	Time	Event
Tuesday, 25 June 2019	09:00	Qualification
Tuesday, 25 June 2019	11:00	Semifinal
Tuesday, 25 June 2019	12:00	Final

== Results ==
=== Qualification ===
Rank	Athlete	Country	Series		Total	Team total	Notes
Rank	Athlete	Country	1	2	Total	Team total	Notes
1	Polina Khorosheva	Russia 1	103.3	103.8	207.1	415.5	Q, GR
1	Kirill Grigoryan	Russia 1	104.7	103.7	208.4	415.5	Q, GR
2	Isabella Straub	Germany 1	101.4	104.8	206.2	414.6	Q
2	Maximilian Dallinger	Germany 1	104.3	104.1	208.4	414.6	Q
3	Nina Christen	Switzerland 1	103.6	102.3	205.9	413.1	Q
3	Jan Lochbihler	Switzerland 1	103.5	103.7	207.2	413.1	Q
4	Petra Lustenberger	Switzerland 2	102.0	102.4	204.4	412.7	Q
4	Christoph Dürr	Switzerland 2	103.0	105.3	208.3	412.7	Q
5	Franziska Peer	Austria 1	104.3	103.3	207.6	412.5	Q
5	Bernhard Pickl	Austria 1	104.3	100.6	204.9	412.5	Q
6	Maria Martynova	Belarus 1	102.6	103.8	206.4	412.1	Q
6	Yury Shcherbatsevich	Belarus 1	103.3	102.4	205.7	412.1	Q
7	Natallia Kalnysh	Ukraine 2	104.1	101.7	205.8	412.1	Q
7	Oleh Tsarkov	Ukraine 2	102.7	103.6	206.3	412.1	Q
8	Selina Gschwandtner	Germany 2	103.3	104.3	207.6	412.0	Q
8	Andre Link	Germany 2	103.5	100.9	204.4	412.0	Q
9	Agnieszka Nagay	Poland	103.7	101.7	205.4	412.0	
9	Tomasz Bartnik	Poland	104.2	102.4	206.6	412.0	
10	Sabrina Sena	Italy	102.2	103.6	205.8	411.9	
10	Lorenzo Bacci	Italy	103.0	103.1	206.1	411.9	
11	Katrine Lund	Norway 2	103.0	102.7	205.7	411.8	
11	Simon Claussen	Norway 2	102.4	103.7	206.1	411.8	
12	Jeanette Duestad	Norway 1	103.5	102.6	206.1	411.8	
12	Henrik Larsen	Norway 1	103.1	102.6	205.7	411.8	
13	Anna Ilina	Ukraine 1	103.9	102.8	206.7	411.5	
13	Serhiy Kulish	Ukraine 1	103.2	101.6	204.8	411.5	
14	Snježana Pejčić	Croatia	102.8	103.1	205.9	411.1	
14	Petar Gorša	Croatia	102.3	102.9	205.2	411.1	
15	Emmi Hyrkäs	Finland	101.1	103.0	204.1	411.0	
15	Juho Kurki	Finland	103.0	103.9	206.9	411.0	
16	Olivia Hofmann	Austria 2	101.9	102.3	204.2	410.9	
16	Alexander Schmirl	Austria 2	103.6	103.1	206.7	410.9	
17	Sviatlana Shcherbatsevich	Belarus 2	100.8	104.3	205.1	410.1	
17	Vitali Bubnovich	Belarus 2	102.2	102.8	205.0	410.1	
18	Stine Nielsen	Denmark 2	102.2	102.0	204.2	410.0	
18	Esben Jakobsen	Denmark 2	104.0	101.8	205.8	410.0	
19	Yulia Zykova	Russia 2	102.2	101.5	203.7	408.9	
19	Sergey Kamenskiy	Russia 2	101.9	103.3	205.2	408.9	
20	Rikke Ibsen	Denmark 1	103.0	101.4	204.4	408.7	
20	Steffen Olsen	Denmark 1	103.0	101.3	204.3	408.7	
21	Živa Dvoršak	Slovenia	100.8	100.4	201.2	408.6	
21	Rajmond Debevec	Slovenia	103.7	103.7	207.4	408.6	
22	Lea Horváth	Hungary	103.0	101.4	204.4	406.8	
22	István Péni	Hungary	101.5	100.9	202.4	406.8	
23	Nikola Mazurová	Czech Republic 1	100.7	100.6	201.3	405.4	
23	Filip Nepejchal	Czech Republic 1	101.0	103.1	204.1	405.4	
24	Lotten Johansson	Sweden	102.7	100.9	203.6	404.7	
24	Marcus Madsen	Sweden	100.0	101.1	201.1	404.7	
25	Aneta Brabcová	Czech Republic 2	102.4	93.3	195.7	403.2	
25	Petr Nymburský	Czech Republic 2	104.0	103.5	207.5	403.2	
	Jade Bordet	France				DNS	
	Brian Baudouin	France				DNS	

=== Semifinal ===
Athlete	Country	Total	Notes
Polina Khorosheva; Kirill Grigoryan	Russia 1	207.5	QF
Selina Gschwandtner; Andre Link	Germany 2	200.6	
Isabella Straub; Maximilian Dallinger	Germany 1	205.3	QF
Natallia Kalnysh; Oleh Tsarkov	Ukraine 2	202.8	
Nina Christen; Jan Lochbihler	Switzerland 1	203.9	QF
Maria Martynova; Yury Shcherbatsevich	Belarus 1	201.8	
Petra Lustenberger; Christoph Dürr	Switzerland 2	202.5	
Franziska Peer; Bernhard Pickl	Austria 1	204.1	QF

=== Final ===
Rank	Athlete	Country	Series		
Rank	Athlete	Country	1	2	3
1st place, gold medalist(s)	Nina Christen; Jan Lochbihler	Switzerland 1	205.8	208.4	209.5
2nd place, silver medalist(s)	Franziska Peer; Bernhard Pickl	Austria 1	208.1	208.3 +20.6	206.6
3rd place, bronze medalist(s)	Polina Khorosheva; Kirill Grigoryan	Russia 1	206.8	208.3 +19.8	
4	Isabella Straub; Maximilian Dallinger	Germany 1	204.8		
