= Shooting at the 2019 European Games – Mixed team 10 metre air rifle =

Mixed team 10 metre air rifle at the 2019 European Games
- Venue: Shooting Centre
- Dates: 22 June
- Competitors: 66 from 21 nations

Medalists
gold medal	Yulia Karimova; Sergey Kamenskiy	Russia
silver medal	Anastasiia Galashina; Vladimir Maslennikov	Russia
bronze medal	Aneta Brabcová; Filip Nepejchal	Czech Republic

The mixed team 10 metre air rifle event at the 2019 European Games in Minsk, Belarus took place on 22 June at the Shooting Centre.

== Schedule ==
All times are local (UTC+3).

Date	Time	Event
Saturday, 22 June 2019	11:30	Qualification
Saturday, 22 June 2019	14:45	Final

== Results ==
=== Qualification ===
==== Stage 1 ====
Rank	Athlete	Country	Series			Total	Team total	Notes
Rank	Athlete	Country	1	2	3	Total	Team total	Notes
1	Anastasiia Galashina	Russia 2	105.0	105.6	105.7	316.3	629.9	Q, GR
1	Vladimir Maslennikov	Russia 2	103.6	104.9	105.1	313.6	629.9	Q, GR
2	Aneta Brabcová	Czech Republic 1	104.8	103.8	103.9	312.5	627.1	Q
2	Filip Nepejchal	Czech Republic 1	105.2	105.0	104.4	314.6	627.1	Q
3	Mandy Mulder	Netherlands	104.7	103.8	103.5	312.0	627.0	Q
3	Peter Hellenbrand	Netherlands	104.9	105.3	104.8	315.0	627.0	Q
4	Jeanette Duestad	Norway 1	104.2	105.2	104.8	314.2	626.0	Q
4	Henrik Larsen	Norway 1	104.9	104.2	102.7	311.8	626.0	Q
5	Yulia Karimova	Russia 1	105.2	104.4	105.1	314.7	625.6	Q
5	Sergey Kamenskiy	Russia 1	102.4	103.9	104.6	310.9	625.6	Q
6	Snježana Pejčić	Croatia 1	101.6	104.4	105.1	311.1	625.4	Q
6	Petar Gorša	Croatia 1	105.5	104.9	103.9	314.3	625.4	Q
7	Petra Zublasing	Italy 1	103.9	103.8	105.7	313.4	624.6	Q
7	Lorenzo Bacci	Italy 1	104.3	103.9	103.0	311.2	624.6	Q
8	Anna Nielsen	Denmark 1	103.1	105.9	103.8	312.8	624.2	Q
8	Mikkel Damholt Hansen	Denmark 1	104.5	103.9	103.0	311.4	624.2	Q
9	Tal Engler	Israel	102.9	102.3	104.7	309.9	623.9	
9	Sergy Rikhter	Israel	104.1	104.2	105.7	314.0	623.9	
10	Lotten Johansson	Sweden	104.2	102.5	105.1	311.8	623.8	
10	Marcus Madsen	Sweden	104.9	103.5	103.6	312.0	623.8	
11	Andrea Arsović	Serbia 2	104.7	103.9	104.5	313.1	623.8	
11	Milutin Stefanović	Serbia 2	102.8	104.0	103.9	310.7	623.8	
12	Julia Anita Simon	Germany 1	103.3	103.2	104.5	311.0	623.6	
12	Julian Justus	Germany 1	105.0	104.4	103.2	312.6	623.6	
13	Maria Martynova	Belarus 2	105.9	106.2	103.7	315.8	622.4	
13	Illia Charheika	Belarus 2	102.5	100.2	103.9	306.6	622.4	
14	Marta Zeljković	Croatia 2	101.6	104.0	104.1	309.7	622.2	
14	Miran Maričić	Croatia 2	101.5	105.1	105.9	312.5	622.2	
15	Franziska Peer	Austria 2	103.1	103.8	105.4	312.3	622.2	
15	Martin Strempfl	Austria 2	103.4	103.7	102.8	309.9	622.2	
16	Jolyn Beer	Germany 2	103.0	103.6	105.0	311.6	621.9	
16	Maximilian Dallinger	Germany 2	103.9	103.5	102.9	310.3	621.9	
17	Anna Ilina	Ukraine 2	103.7	102.8	103.4	309.9	621.6	
17	Oleh Tsarkov	Ukraine 2	104.6	103.1	104.0	311.7	621.6	
18	Katarzyna Komorowska	Poland	103.2	104.2	101.4	308.8	621.5	
18	Tomasz Bartnik	Poland	103.3	105.0	104.4	312.7	621.5	
19	Jade Bordet	France	102.1	104.0	104.4	310.5	621.2	
19	Brian Baudouin	France	101.8	104.0	104.9	310.7	621.2	
20	Lea Horváth	Hungary	103.0	102.6	103.8	309.4	621.2	
20	Péter Sidi	Hungary	104.3	104.5	103.0	311.8	621.2	
21	Jenny Stene	Norway 2	103.9	102.1	103.0	309.0	621.1	
21	Vegard Nordhagen	Norway 2	105.1	103.4	103.6	312.1	621.1	
22	Natallia Kalnysh	Ukraine 1	103.7	103.4	101.0	308.1	620.2	
22	Serhiy Kulish	Ukraine 1	104.6	103.0	104.5	312.1	620.2	
23	Alla Poghosyan	Armenia	102.9	104.9	104.3	312.1	620.0	
23	Hrachik Babayan	Armenia	103.3	103.1	101.5	307.9	620.0	
24	Martina Ziviani	Italy 2	103.1	103.9	103.7	310.7	619.6	
24	Riccardo Armiraglio	Italy 2	103.2	102.8	102.9	308.9	619.6	
25	Nina Christen	Switzerland 2	102.9	102.7	104.3	309.9	619.2	
25	Christoph Dürr	Switzerland 2	102.0	104.0	103.3	309.3	619.2	
26	Laura Coman	Romania	104.2	103.6	102.8	310.6	619.1	
26	Alin Moldoveanu	Romania	103.0	103.2	102.3	308.5	619.1	
27	Emmi Hyrkäs	Finland	101.3	100.9	101.9	304.1	618.3	
27	Juho Kurki	Finland	104.3	104.7	105.2	314.2	618.3	
28	Sviatlana Shcherbatsevich	Belarus 1	101.1	102.9	103.4	307.4	618.1	
28	Vitali Bubnovich	Belarus 1	104.5	103.1	103.1	310.7	618.1	
29	Marija Malić	Serbia 1	103.1	100.2	104.5	307.8	617.1	
29	Milenko Sebić	Serbia 1	102.8	104.6	101.9	309.3	617.1	
30	Nikola Mazurová	Czech Republic 2	102.0	104.9	103.3	310.2	616.8	
30	Petr Nymburský	Czech Republic 2	102.6	101.0	103.0	306.6	616.8	
31	Olivia Hofmann	Austria 1	102.4	101.4	102.2	306.0	616.1	
31	Bernhard Pickl	Austria 1	103.9	103.3	102.9	310.1	616.1	
32	Rikke Ibsen	Denmark 2	103.8	101.7	102.6	308.1	615.9	
32	Steffen Olsen	Denmark 2	102.8	101.7	103.3	307.8	615.9	
33	Petra Lustenberger	Switzerland 1	100.5	103.7	102.5	306.7	615.3	
33	Jan Lochbihler	Switzerland 1	103.6	101.8	103.2	308.6	615.3	

==== Stage 2 ====
Rank	Athlete	Country	Series		Total	Team total	Notes
Rank	Athlete	Country	1	2	Total	Team total	Notes
1	Anastasiia Galashina	Russia 2	104.3	104.4	208.7	417.8	QG
1	Vladimir Maslennikov	Russia 2	103.7	105.4	209.1	417.8	QG
2	Yulia Karimova	Russia 1	103.9	103.7	207.6	417.8	QG
2	Sergey Kamenskiy	Russia 1	105.5	104.7	210.2	417.8	QG
3	Jeanette Duestad	Norway 1	103.8	104.3	208.1	416.1	QB
3	Henrik Larsen	Norway 1	104.3	103.7	208.0	416.1	QB
4	Aneta Brabcová	Czech Republic 1	102.9	103.6	206.5	415.0	QB
4	Filip Nepejchal	Czech Republic 1	104.1	104.4	208.5	415.0	QB
5	Mandy Mulder	Netherlands	102.5	104.2	206.7	414.4	
5	Peter Hellenbrand	Netherlands	104.2	103.5	207.7	414.4	
6	Snježana Pejčić	Croatia 1	103.2	105.0	208.2	414.2	
6	Petar Gorša	Croatia 1	102.1	103.9	206.0	414.2	
7	Petra Zublasing	Italy 1	103.8	101.5	205.3	411.3	
7	Lorenzo Bacci	Italy 1	102.6	103.4	206.0	411.3	
8	Anna Nielsen	Denmark 1	103.9	103.7	207.6	409.4	
8	Mikkel Damholt Hansen	Denmark 1	99.7	102.1	201.8	409.4	

=== Finals ===
Rank	Athletes	Country	Result
Gold medal match
1st place, gold medalist(s)	Yulia Karimova; Sergey Kamenskiy	Russia	16
2nd place, silver medalist(s)	Anastasiia Galashina; Vladimir Maslennikov	Russia	12
Bronze medal match
3rd place, bronze medalist(s)	Aneta Brabcová; Filip Nepejchal	Czech Republic	17
4	Jeanette Duestad; Henrik Larsen	Norway	11
