= Shooting at the 2019 European Games – Women's 10 metre air rifle =

Women's 10 metre air rifle at the 2019 European Games
- Venue: Shooting Centre
- Dates: 24 June
- Competitors: 41 from 24 nations
- Winning score: 251.3

Medalists
gold medal	Laura-Georgeta Coman	Romania
silver medal	Nina Christen	Switzerland
bronze medal	Nikola Mazurová	Czech Republic

The women's 10 metre air rifle event at the 2019 European Games in Minsk, Belarus took place on 24 June at the Shooting Centre.

== Schedule ==
All times are local (UTC+3).

Date	Time	Event
Monday, 24 June 2019	08:00	Qualification
Monday, 24 June 2019	13:00	Final

== Records ==
Prior to this competition, the existing world, European and Games records were as follows.

Qualification
World Record	Zhao Ruozhu (CHN)	634.0	New Delhi, India	23 February 2019
European Record	Laura Coman (ROU)	631.6	Munich, Germany	26 May 2019
Games Record	ISSF Rule changed on 01.01.2018	—	—	—
Final
World Record	Apurvi Chandela (IND)	252.9	New Delhi, India	23 February 2019
European Record	Laura Coman (ROU)	251.5	Guadalajara, Mexico	3 March 2018
Games Record	ISSF Rule changed on 01.01.2018	—	—	—

== Results ==
=== Qualification ===
Rank	Athlete	Country	1	2	3	4	5	6	Total	Notes
1	Yulia Karimova	Russia	103.3	105.0	105.3	105.4	105.1	105.7	629.8	Q, GR
2	Nina Christen	Switzerland	104.5	104.5	105.4	105.1	102.8	105.5	627.8	Q
3	Jeanette Duestad	Norway	104.0	103.7	104.4	105.0	104.5	105.4	627.0	Q
4	Maria Martynova	Belarus	104.6	106.0	104.5	104.2	103.8	103.9	627.0	Q
5	Laura-Georgeta Coman	Romania	105.6	105.1	103.9	104.8	103.4	103.9	626.7	Q
6	Nikola Mazurová	Czech Republic	104.7	103.7	104.7	105.6	103.0	104.8	626.5	Q
7	Jolyn Beer	Germany	104.6	105.0	103.5	104.6	103.8	104.9	626.4	Q
8	Urška Kuharič	Slovenia	103.2	103.8	104.2	104.7	103.4	106.3	625.6	Q
9	Jade Bordet	France	105.5	104.8	103.2	105.1	103.1	103.8	625.5	
10	Anastasiia Galashina	Russia	104.0	103.4	104.1	105.2	104.0	104.6	625.3	
11	Petra Zublasing	Italy	103.8	103.3	102.3	105.4	105.3	105.0	625.1	
12	Tal Engler	Israel	103.8	104.2	104.9	104.6	103.8	103.7	625.0	
13	Roxana Sidi	Romania	103.5	104.3	104.1	103.8	104.1	105.1	624.9	
14	Lea Horváth	Hungary	102.9	105.5	103.6	104.6	104.3	104.0	624.9	
15	Andrea Arsović	Serbia	104.1	104.5	104.1	103.6	103.5	105.0	624.8	
16	Franziska Peer	Austria	103.1	103.4	105.0	103.5	104.8	104.8	624.6	
17	Seonaid McIntosh	Great Britain	105.8	104.6	104.1	104.3	102.3	103.4	624.5	
18	Alla Poghosyan	Armenia	102.4	104.3	104.3	104.7	103.6	105.0	624.3	
19	Snježana Pejčić	Croatia	104.0	104.7	103.6	104.1	105.3	102.6	624.3	
20	Stine Nielsen	Denmark	102.4	104.5	103.6	104.8	104.3	104.5	624.1	
21	Julia Anita Simon	Germany	104.8	104.6	104.5	103.3	103.5	103.3	624.0	
22	Živa Dvoršak	Slovenia	102.8	103.8	103.9	103.7	104.1	105.4	623.7	
23	Rikke Ibsen	Denmark	104.7	104.0	104.4	104.6	103.8	102.1	623.6	
24	Emmi Hyrkäs	Finland	103.4	104.9	104.2	103.7	103.6	103.5	623.3	
25	Olivia Hofmann	Austria	103.4	105.7	104.4	103.4	104.2	102.2	623.3	
26	Aneta Brabcová	Czech Republic	104.8	103.5	103.1	102.1	105.2	104.4	623.1	
27	Jenny Stene	Norway	105.5	102.9	104.2	103.0	104.5	102.9	623.0	
28	Jenna Kuisma	Finland	104.1	102.9	105.5	103.2	103.4	103.7	622.8	
29	Petra Lustenberger	Switzerland	102.8	104.7	104.0	104.5	102.4	104.2	622.6	
30	Katarzyna Komorowska	Poland	103.3	103.8	103.1	104.1	103.4	104.5	622.2	
31	Martina Ziviani	Italy	102.9	102.5	104.5	105.6	105.0	101.7	622.2	
32	Agnieszka Nagay	Poland	99.6	104.8	104.8	104.2	103.9	103.8	621.1	
33	Mandy Mulder	Netherlands	103.3	103.4	104.9	103.5	102.1	103.7	620.9	
34	Lotten Johansson	Sweden	102.6	104.0	102.3	104.4	102.3	105.2	620.8	
35	Natallia Kalnysh	Ukraine	101.5	103.7	104.1	105.0	102.6	103.7	620.6	
36	Sviatlana Shcherbatsevich	Belarus	103.1	102.7	104.7	102.9	103.4	103.0	619.8	
37	Isabelle Johansson	Sweden	101.4	103.9	104.1	103.5	104.2	102.5	619.6	
38	Marta Zeljković	Croatia	102.4	100.7	103.6	103.8	103.5	104.5	618.5	
39	Marija Malić	Serbia	100.6	101.0	104.9	104.5	104.2	101.5	616.7	
40	Anna Ilina	Ukraine	100.3	101.6	103.1	102.3	101.9	105.0	614.2	
41	Anzela Voronova	Estonia	101.2	104.4	103.0	99.4	100.4	100.7	609.1	
	Esther Barrugués	Andorra							DNS	

=== Final ===
Rank	Athlete	Series									Total	Notes
Rank	Athlete	1	2	3	4	5	6	7	8	9	Total	Notes
1st place, gold medalist(s)	Laura-Georgeta Coman (ROU)	51.5	52.9	20.6	21.2	21.7	21.6	20.6	21.3	19.9	251.3	GR
1st place, gold medalist(s)	Laura-Georgeta Coman (ROU)	51.5	104.4	125.0	146.2	167.9	189.5	210.1	231.4	251.3	251.3	GR
2nd place, silver medalist(s)	Nina Christen (SUI)	52.8	52.0	20.7	20.5	20.6	21.3	20.8	20.9	20.4	250.0	
2nd place, silver medalist(s)	Nina Christen (SUI)	52.8	104.8	125.5	146.0	166.6	187.9	208.7	229.6	250.0	250.0	
3rd place, bronze medalist(s)	Nikola Mazurová (CZE)	52.6	51.1	20.6	21.0	20.6	21.1	20.8	20.9		228.7	
3rd place, bronze medalist(s)	Nikola Mazurová (CZE)	52.6	103.7	124.3	145.3	165.9	187.0	207.8	228.7		228.7	
4	Jeanette Duestad (NOR)	51.0	52.4	20.3	20.2	21.0	20.7	20.9			206.5	
4	Jeanette Duestad (NOR)	51.0	103.4	123.7	143.9	164.9	185.6	206.5			206.5	
5	Yulia Karimova (RUS)	51.9	52.4	20.6	20.2	20.0	20.2				185.3	
5	Yulia Karimova (RUS)	51.9	104.3	124.9	145.1	165.1	185.3				185.3	
6	Maria Martynova (BLR)	49.9	52.2	20.4	20.5	20.2					163.2	
6	Maria Martynova (BLR)	49.9	102.1	122.5	143.0	163.2					163.2	
7	Urška Kuharič (SLO)	49.1	51.6	20.4	20.2						141.3	
7	Urška Kuharič (SLO)	49.1	100.7	121.1	141.3						141.3	
8	Jolyn Beer (GER)	47.8	50.3	19.9							118.0	
8	Jolyn Beer (GER)	47.8	98.1	118.0							118.0	
