= Serbia at the 2019 European Games =

- IOC code: SRB
- NOC: Olympic Committee of Serbia
- Website: www.oks.org.rs

in Minsk, Belarus 21 – 30 June 2019
- Competitors: 66 in 12 sports
- Flag bearers: Marko Ždero (opening); Mate Nemeš (closing)
- Medals Ranked 33rd: Gold 1 Silver 2 Bronze 3 Total 6

European Games appearances (overview)
- 2015; 2019; 2023; 2027

Serbia competed at the 2019 European Games, in Minsk, Belarus from 21 to 30 June 2019.

The Olympic Committee of Serbia sent a total of 66 athletes to the Games, 40 men and 25 women, to compete in 12 sports.

== Medalists ==
Medal	Name	Sport	Event	Date
Gold	Zorana Arunović	Shooting	Women's 10 m air pistol	23 June
Silver	Damir Mikec; Zorana Arunović	Shooting	Mixed team 10 m air pistol	22 June
Silver	Stevan Mićić	Wrestling	Men's 57 kg	26 June
Bronze	Dmitrij Gerasimenko	Sambo	Men's 90 kg	23 June
Bronze	Vladimir Gajić	Sambo	Men's +100 kg	23 June
Bronze	Mate Nemeš	Wrestling	Men's Greco-Roman 67 kg	29 June

== Archery ==
Compound

Athlete	Event	Ranking round		Round of 16	Quarterfinals	Semifinals	Final / BM	
Athlete	Event	Score	Seed	Opposition Score	Opposition Score	Opposition Score	Opposition Score	Rank
Ognjen Nedeljković	Men's individual	708 GR	1	Baptista (POR); W 142–138	Ravenscroft (GBR); L 144–139	Did not advance		

== Badminton ==
Men

Athlete	Event	Group Stage				Elimination	Quarterfinal	Semifinal	Final / BM	
Athlete	Event	Opposition Score	Opposition Score	Opposition Score	Rank	Opposition Score	Opposition Score	Opposition Score	Opposition Score	Rank
Luka Milić	Men's singles	Leverdez (FRA); L 0–2	Gunnarsson (ISL); W 1-1^{r}	Kirchmayr (SUI); L 0–2	3	Did not advance				

== Basketball (3x3) ==
Men's tournament

=== Pool A ===
Pos	Team	Pld	W	L	PF	PA	PD	Qualification	(Serbia)	(Poland)	(Romania)	(Andorra)
1	Serbia	3	3	0	62	40	+22	Quarterfinals	—		20–18	22–8
2	Poland	3	2	1	56	41	+15	Quarterfinals	14–20	—		
3	Romania	3	1	2	48	60	−12			9–21	—	21–19
4	Andorra	3	0	3	39	55	−16			12–21		—

First match(es) will be played: 21 June 2019. Source: Minsk2019
Rules for classification: 1) Wins; 2) Head-to-head record; 3) Points scored; 4) Higher seed.

==== Quarterfinals ====
24 Jun, 2019
13:50

Serbia	15–19	Belarus

Palova Arena, Minsk

Women's tournament

=== Pool A ===
Pos	Team	Pld	W	L	PF	PA	PD	Qualification	(Belarus)	(Russia)	(Serbia)	(Italy)
1	Belarus (H)	3	2	1	57	44	+13	Quarterfinals	—	21–16		
2	Russia	3	2	1	52	27	+25	Quarterfinals		—	15–9	21–2
3	Serbia	3	2	1	48	47	+1		21–15		—	
4	Italy	3	0	3	26	60	−34		7–21		17–18	—

Updated to match(es) played on 21 June 2019. Source: Minsk2019
Rules for classification: 1) Wins; 2) Head-to-head record; 3) Points scored; 4) Higher seed.
(H) Hosts

== Boxing ==
Men

Athlete	Event	Round of 32	Round of 16	Quarterfinals	Semifinals	Final	
Athlete	Event	Opposition Result	Opposition Result	Opposition Result	Opposition Result	Opposition Result	Rank
Dušan Janjić	52 kg	Bye	Bennama (FRA); L 0-5 WP	Did not advance			
Veljko Gligorić	56 kg	Kistohurry (FRA); L 0-5 WP	Did not advance				
Nemanja Gavrilović	60 kg	Rodrighez (FRA); L 0-5 WP	Did not advance				
Aleksandar Konovalov	64 kg	Baryshnik (GER); W 4-1 WP	Durkacz (POL); L 0-5 WP	Did not advance			
Damjan Grmuša	69 kg	Ekinci (TUR); L 0-5 WP	Did not advance				
Milosav Savić	75 kg	Kharabadze (GEO); L 0-5 WP	Did not advance				
Sandro Poletan	81 kg	Strnisko (SVK); L 1-4 WP	Did not advance				
Slobodan Jovanović	91 kg	Waigel (GER); L - WO	Did not advance				
Vladan Babić	+91 kg	Bye	Valavicius (LTU); W 5-0 WP	Vykhryst (UKR); L 0-5 WP	Did not advance		

Women

Athlete	Event	Round of 16	Quarterfinals	Semifinals	Final	
Athlete	Event	Opposition Result	Opposition Result	Opposition Result	Opposition Result	Rank
Jelena Zekić	57 kg	Mestiaen (FRA); L 0-5 WP	Did not advance			

== Canoeing ==
Men

Athlete	Event	Heats		Semifinals		Finals	
Athlete	Event	Time	Rank	Time	Rank	Time	Rank
Marko Dragosavljević	K1 200 m	35.583	6 QS	35.339	4 QFB	39.478	17
Milenko Zorić; Stefan Vekić	K2 1000 m	3:17.727	7 QS	3:16.017	8	Did not advance	

Women

Athlete	Event	Heats		Semifinals		Finals	
Athlete	Event	Time	Rank	Time	Rank	Time	Rank
Milica Starović	K1 200 m	41.339	2 QS	41.305	1 QFA	43.210	7
Milica Starović	K1 500 m	1:47.522	1 QFA	—N/a		2:06.226	4
Kristina Bedeč	K1 5000 m	—N/a				25:48.266	5
Kristina Bedeč; Marija Dostanić	K2 500 m	1:42.419	7 QS	1:42.640	6	Did not advance	

== Cycling ==
=== Road ===
Men

Athlete	Event	Time	Rank
Dušan Rajović	Men's road race	4:11:55	75
Stevan Klisurić	Men's road race	4:23:56	111

Women

Athlete	Event	Time	Rank
Jelena Erić	Women's road race	3:08:32	36

== Judo ==
Men

Athlete	Event	Round of 32	Round of 16	Quarterfinals	Semifinals	Repechage	Final / BM	
Athlete	Event	Opposition Result	Opposition Result	Opposition Result	Opposition Result	Opposition Result	Opposition Result	Rank
Strahinja Bunčić	66 kg	Margvelashvili (GEO); L 00–01	Did not advance					
Nemanja Majdov	90 kg	Şişmanlar (TUR); W 10–00	Chamberlain (GBR); L 00–11	Did not advance				
Aleksandar Kukolj	90 kg	Kuczera (POL); W 10–00	Özerler (TUR); L 00–10	Did not advance				
Bojan Došen	100 kg	Kotsoiev (AZE); L 00–10	Did not advance					
Žarko Ćulum	+100 kg	Tsoumitas (GRE); W 10–00	Grol (NED); L 00–10	Did not advance				

Women

Athlete	Event	Round of 32	Round of 16	Quarterfinals	Semifinals	Repechage	Final / BM	
Athlete	Event	Opposition Result	Opposition Result	Opposition Result	Opposition Result	Opposition Result	Opposition Result	Rank
Milica Nikolić	48 kg	Bye	Siderot (POR); W 10–00	Figueroa (ESP); W 01–00	Bilodid (UKR); L 01–10	—N/a	Štangar (SLO); L 00–01	5
Andrea Stojadinov	48 kg	Ungureanu (ROU); W 01–00	Štangar (SLO); L 00–10	Did not advance				
Jovana Rogić	57 kg	Ohai (ROU); W 10–00	Equisoain (ESP); L 00–10	Did not advance				
Marica Perišić	57 kg	Libeer (BEL); L 01–11	Did not advance					
Anja Obradović	63 kg	Ozbas (HUN); W 10–00	Davydova (RUS); L 00–10	Did not advance				
Milica Žabić	+78 kg	Bye	Cerić (BIH); L 00–10	Did not advance				

Mixed team

Athlete	Event	Round of 16	Quarterfinals	Semifinals	Repechage	Final / BM	
Athlete	Event	Opposition Result	Opposition Result	Opposition Result	Opposition Result	Opposition Result	Rank
Strahinja Bunčić; Aleksandar Kukolj; Bojan Došen; Žarko Ćulum; Marica Perišić; Anja Obradović; Milica Žabić	Mixed team	Poland; W 4–3	Russia; L 0–4	Did not advance	Austria; L 1–4	Did not advance	7

== Karate ==
Men

Athlete	Event	Group stage				Semifinal	Final / BM	
Athlete	Event	Opposition Score	Opposition Score	Opposition Score	Rank	Opposition Score	Opposition Score	Rank
Slobodan Bitević	+84 kg	Kvesić (CRO); L 0–2	Arkania (GEO); D 0-0	Vodchyts (BLR); D 0-0	3	Did not advance		

Women

Athlete	Event	Group stage				Semifinal	Final / BM	
Athlete	Event	Opposition Score	Opposition Score	Opposition Score	Rank	Opposition Score	Opposition Score	Rank
Jelena Milivojčević	50 kg	Bouderbane (FRA); L 2-2	Kryva (UKR); L 0–1	Plank (AUT); L 0–1	4	Did not advance		
Jovana Preković	61 kg	Serogina (UKR); L 0–4	Alstadsæther (NOR); W 3–0	Philippe (FRA); L 0–4	3	Did not advance		

== Sambo ==
Men

Athlete	Event	Quarterfinal	Semifinal	Final / BM	
Athlete	Event	Opposition Score	Opposition Score	Opposition Score	Rank
Dmitrij Gerasimenko	90 kg	Jourdan (FRA); W 6–0	Kazusionak (BLR); L 0–3	Stetsenko (UKR); W 8–0	3rd place, bronze medalist(s)
Vladimir Gajić	+100 kg	Osipenko (RUS); W 5–1	Berdzenishvili (GEO); L 0–8	Fernandez (ESP); W 6–0	3rd place, bronze medalist(s)

Women

Athlete	Event	Quarterfinal	Semifinal	Final / BM	
Athlete	Event	Opposition Score	Opposition Score	Opposition Score	Rank
Ivana Jandrić	68 kg	Le Gall (FRA); W 9–0	Moskalova (UKR); L 2-2	Namazava (BLR); L 1-1	5

== Shooting ==
Men

Athlete	Event	Qualification		Final	
Athlete	Event	Points	Rank	Points	Rank
Damir Mikec	10 m air pistol	583	3 Q	137.6	7
Dimitrije Grgić	10 m air pistol	578	11	Did not advance	
Milenko Sebić	50m rifle 3 positions	1169	13	Did not advance	
Milenko Sebić	10m air rifle	623.9	23	Did not advance	
Lazar Kovačević	50m rifle 3 positions	1162	23	Did not advance	
Milutin Stefanović	10m air rifle	624.5	20	Did not advance	
Borko Vasiljević	Trap	114	13	Did not advance	

Women

Athlete	Event	Qualification		Final	
Athlete	Event	Points	Rank	Points	Rank
Zorana Arunović	10 m air pistol	578	2 Q	241.2 GR	1st place, gold medalist(s)
Zorana Arunović	25 m pistol	585	4 Q	12	7
Bobana Veličković	10 m air pistol	572	10	Did not advance	
Bobana Veličković	25 m pistol	555	24	Did not advance	
Andrea Arsović	50m rifle 3 positions	1152	25	Did not advance	
Andrea Arsović	10m air rifle	624.8	15	Did not advance	
Sanja Vukašinović	50m rifle 3 positions	1168	2 Q	433.7	4
Marija Malić	10m air rifle	616.7	39	Did not advance	

Mixed

Athlete	Event	Qualification				Final / BM	
Athlete	Event	Stage 1		Stage 2		Final / BM	
Athlete	Event	Points	Rank	Points	Rank	Opposition Result	Rank
Damir Mikec; Zorana Arunović	Team 10m air pistol	576	3 Q	385	2 QG	Chernousov / Batsarashkina (RUS); L 9–17	2nd place, silver medalist(s)
Dimitrije Grgić; Bobana Veličković	Team 10m air pistol	567	18	Did not advance			
Milutin Stefanović; Andrea Arsović	Team 10m air rifle	623.8	11	Did not advance			
Milenko Sebić; Marija Malić	Team 10m air rifle	617.1	29	Did not advance			

== Table tennis ==
Athlete	Event	Round 1	Round 2	Round 3	Round of 16	Quarterfinals	Semifinals	Final / BM	
Athlete	Event	Opposition Score	Opposition Score	Opposition Score	Opposition Score	Opposition Score	Opposition Score	Opposition Score	Rank
Aleksandar Karakašević	Men's singles	Putuntica (MDA); W 4–1	Lind (DEN); L 2–4	Did not advance					
Izabela Lupulesku	Women's singles	Bye	Gaponova (UKR); L 2–4	Did not advance					
Andrea Todorović	Women's singles	Bye	Partyka (POL); L 1–4	Did not advance					
Aleksandar Karakašević; Izabela Lupulesku	Mixed doubles	—N/a			Dvorak/Robles (ESP); L 2–3	Did not advance			

== Wrestling ==
=== Men's freestyle ===
Athlete	Event	Round of 16	Quarterfinal	Semifinal	Repechage	Final / BM	
Athlete	Event	Opposition Result	Opposition Result	Opposition Result	Opposition Result	Opposition Result	Rank
Stevan Mićić	57 kg	Lomtadze (GEO); W 4–2	Atli (TUR); W 6–5	Markovych (UKR); W 7–4	Bye	Amiraslanov (AZE); L 1–9	2nd place, silver medalist(s)

=== Men's Greco-Roman ===
Athlete	Event	Round of 16	Quarterfinal	Semifinal	Repechage	Final / BM	
Athlete	Event	Opposition Result	Opposition Result	Opposition Result	Opposition Result	Opposition Result	Rank
Mate Nemeš	67 kg	Vetsch (SUI); W 8–0	Bolkvadze (GEO); L 0–2	Did not advance	Burger (AUT); W 9–0	Aslanyan (ARM); W 2–1	3rd place, bronze medalist(s)
Aleksandar Maksimović	77 kg	Babayan (POL); W 3–1	Basar (TUR); L 4–6	Did not advance			
Nikolaj Dobrev	87 kg	Abbasov (AZE); L 0–8	Did not advance		Lorincz (HUN); L 3–6	Did not advance	
Mikheil Kajaia	97 kg	Kiss (HUN); W 6–1	İldem (TUR); L 5–7	Did not advance			
