= Shooting at the 2020 Summer Olympics =

Shooting at the Games of the XXXII Olympiad
- Venue: Asaka Shooting Range
- Dates: 24 July – 2 August 2021
- No. of events: 15
- Competitors: 360 (180 men and 180 women)

Shooting competitions at the 2020 Summer Olympics in Tokyo were originally scheduled from 25 July to 3 August 2020, due to the postponement of the Summer Olympics to 2021, the rescheduled dates were on 24 July to 2 August 2021 at the Asaka Shooting Range. Unlike in 2016, the number of shooters competing across fifteen events at these Games had been reduced from 390 to 360, with an equal distribution between men and women. Furthermore, several significant changes were instituted in the Olympic shooting program, including the substitution of three male-only events (rifle prone, free pistol, and double trap), with the mixed team competitions.

== Competition format ==
On 9 June 2017, the International Shooting Sport Federation welcomed the decision of the International Olympic Committee to approve the changes to the Olympic shooting program in achieving gender equality and to enhance the sport's popularity and worldwide appeal. One of the significant changes in the program was to replace the three men-only events, namely 50 m rifle prone, 50 m pistol, and double trap, with the mixed team competitions (rifle, pistol, and trap), as a means of ensuring gender equality. Other ratified changes included the same number of shots for both men and women and the progressive elimination finals for both the women's sport pistol and the shotgun events.

Similar to the 2016 format, all shooters who advanced to the Olympic finals of their individual events must start from scratch and compete against each other in a series of elimination rounds. The stage continues until the competition leaves with only two shooters battling out in a duel to decide the gold and silver medals.

== Qualification ==
In February 2018, the International Shooting Sport Federation agreed to change the rules on the allocation of the Olympic quota places, as it aims to attain gender equality. As a result, a total of 360 quota places, an equal distribution between men and women, will be awarded at the top-level global and continental championships.

As per the guidelines from the International Shooting Sport Federation, the qualification period commences with the 2018 ISSF World Shooting Championships in Changwon, South Korea, which concludes on 15 September 2018, less than two years before the Olympics. There, forty-eight individual and twelve mixed team quota places will be assigned. Throughout the process, quota places will be generally awarded when a shooter earns a gold medal in an ISSF World Cup series or posts a top finish at the ISSF World Championships or the continental championships (Africa, Europe, Asia, Oceania, and the Americas).

After the qualification period concludes and all NOCs receive the official list of quota places, the ISSF will check the World Ranking list in each of the individual shooting events. The highest-ranked shooter, who has not qualified in any event and whose NOC does not have a berth in a specific event, will obtain a direct Olympic quota place.

Unlike the previous Games, host nation Japan is guaranteed twelve quota places, with one in each of the individual shooting events.

== Schedule ==
Legend
Q	Qualification	F	Final

Event ↓ / Date →	Sat 24		Sun 25		Mon 26		Tue 27		Wed 28	Thu 29		Fri 30		Sat 31		Sun 1	Mon 2	
Rifle
Men's 10 m air rifle			Q	F														
Men's 50 m rifle 3 positions																	Q	F
Women's 10 m air rifle	Q	F																
Women's 50 m rifle 3 positions														Q	F			
Mixed 10 m air rifle team							Q	F										
Pistol
Men's 10 m air pistol	Q	F																
Men's 25 m rapid fire pistol																Q		F
Women's 10 m air pistol			Q	F														
Women's 25 m pistol										Q		Q	F					
Mixed 10 m air pistol team							Q	F										
Shotgun
Men's trap									Q	Q	F							
Men's skeet			Q		Q	F												
Women's trap									Q	Q	F							
Women's skeet			Q		Q	F												
Mixed trap team														Q	F			

== Medal summary ==
=== Medal table ===
* Host nation (Japan)

Rank	NOC	Gold	Silver	Bronze	Total
1	China	4	1	6	11
2	United States	3	2	1	6
3	ROC	2	4	2	8
4	Czech Republic	1	1	0	2
5	Switzerland	1	0	1	2
6	France	1	0	0	1
6	Iran	1	0	0	1
6	Slovakia	1	0	0	1
6	Spain	1	0	0	1
10	San Marino	0	1	1	2
10	Serbia	0	1	1	2
12	Bulgaria	0	1	0	1
12	Cuba	0	1	0	1
12	Denmark	0	1	0	1
12	Italy	0	1	0	1
12	South Korea	0	1	0	1
17	Great Britain	0	0	1	1
17	Kuwait	0	0	1	1
17	Ukraine	0	0	1	1
Totals (19 entries)		15	15	15	45

=== Men's events ===
Event	Gold	Silver	Bronze
10 metre air pistol	Javad Foroughi; Iran	Damir Mikec; Serbia	Pang Wei; China
25 metre rapid fire pistol	Jean Quiquampoix; France	Leuris Pupo; Cuba	Li Yuehong; China
10 metre air rifle	Will Shaner; United States	Sheng Lihao; China	Yang Haoran; China
50 metre rifle three positions	Zhang Changhong; China	Sergey Kamenskiy; ROC	Milenko Sebić; Serbia
Skeet	Vincent Hancock; United States	Jesper Hansen; Denmark	Abdullah Al-Rashidi; Kuwait
Trap	Jiří Lipták; Czech Republic	David Kostelecký; Czech Republic	Matthew Coward-Holley; Great Britain

=== Women's events ===
Event	Gold	Silver	Bronze
10 metre air pistol	Vitalina Batsarashkina; ROC	Antoaneta Kostadinova; Bulgaria	Jiang Ranxin; China
25 metre pistol	Vitalina Batsarashkina; ROC	Kim Min-jung; South Korea	Xiao Jiaruixuan; China
10 metre air rifle	Yang Qian; China	Anastasiia Galashina; ROC	Nina Christen; Switzerland
50 metre rifle three positions	Nina Christen; Switzerland	Yulia Zykova; ROC	Yulia Karimova; ROC
Skeet	Amber English; United States	Diana Bacosi; Italy	Wei Meng; China
Trap	Zuzana Rehák-Štefečeková; Slovakia	Kayle Browning; United States	Alessandra Perilli; San Marino

=== Mixed events ===
Event	Gold	Silver	Bronze
10 metre air pistol team	China; Jiang Ranxin; Pang Wei	ROC; Vitalina Batsarashkina; Artem Chernousov	Ukraine; Olena Kostevych; Oleh Omelchuk
10 metre air rifle team	China; Yang Qian; Yang Haoran	United States; Mary Tucker; Lucas Kozeniesky	ROC; Yulia Karimova; Sergey Kamenskiy
Trap team	Spain; Alberto Fernández; Fátima Gálvez	San Marino; Gian Marco Berti; Alessandra Perilli	United States; Brian Burrows; Madelynn Bernau

== Records broken ==
Event	Round	Name	Nation	Score	Date	Record
Women's 10 metre air rifle	Qualification	Jeanette Hegg Duestad	Norway	632.9	24 July	OR
Women's 10 metre air rifle	Final	Yang Qian	China	251.8	24 July	OR
Men's 10 metre air pistol	Final	Javad Foroughi	Iran	244.8	24 July	OR
Women's 10 metre air pistol	Qualification	Jiang Ranxin	China	587	25 July	=WR (Note: Listed as it is also an Olympic record, which was not previously established in this event.)
Women's 10 metre air pistol	Final	Vitalina Batsarashkina	ROC	240.3	25 July	OR
Men's 10 metre air rifle	Qualification	Yang Haoran	China	632.7	25 July	OR
Men's 10 metre air rifle	Final	William Shaner	United States	251.6	25 July	OR
Women's skeet	Qualification	Wei Meng	China	124	26 July	=WR
Men's skeet	Qualification	Éric Delaunay	France	124	26 July	OR
Men's skeet	Qualification	Tammaro Cassandro	Italy	124	26 July	OR
Women's skeet	Final	Amber English	United States	56	26 July	OR
Men's skeet	Final	Vincent Hancock	United States	59	26 July	OR
Mixed 10 metre air pistol team	Qualification	Manu Bhaker; Saurabh Chaudhary	India	582	27 July	OR
Mixed 10 metre air rifle team	Qualification	Yang Qian; Yang Haoran	China	633.2	27 July	WR
Women's trap	Qualification	Zuzana Rehák-Štefečeková	Slovakia	125	29 July	WR
Women's trap	Final	Zuzana Rehák-Štefečeková	Slovakia	43	29 July	OR
Men's trap	Final	Jiří Lipták	Czech Republic	43	29 July	OR
Men's trap	Final	David Kostelecký	Czech Republic	43	29 July	OR
Women's 25 metre pistol	Final	Vitalina Batsarashkina	ROC	38	30 July	OR
Women's 25 metre pistol	Final	Kim Min-jung	South Korea	38	30 July	OR
Mixed trap team	Qualification	Fátima Gálvez; Alberto Fernández	Spain	148	31 July	OR
Mixed trap team	Qualification	Alessandra Perilli; Gian Marco Berti	San Marino	148	31 July	OR
Women's 50 metre rifle three positions	Qualification	Yulia Zykova	ROC	1182	31 July	OR
Women's 50 metre rifle three positions	Final	Nina Christen	Switzerland	463.9	31 July	OR
Men's 50 metre rifle three positions	Final	Zhang Changhong	China	466.0	2 August	WR

== See also ==
- Shooting at the 2018 Asian Games
- Shooting at the 2018 Commonwealth Games
- Shooting at the 2019 European Games
- Shooting at the 2019 Pan American Games
- Shooting at the 2020 Summer Paralympics
