= Shooting at the 2023 European Games – Women's 10 metre air rifle =

Women's 10 metre air rifle at the 2023 European Games
- Venue: Wrocław Shooting Centre
- Dates: 23 June
- Competitors: 37 from 24 nations

Medalists
| gold medal | Nina Christen | Switzerland |
| silver medal | Kamila Novotná | Slovakia |
| bronze medal | Océanne Muller | France |

The women's 10 metre air rifle event at the 2023 European Games took place on 23 June at the Wrocław Shooting Centre.

== Records ==
Prior to this competition, the existing world, European and Games records were as follows.

Qualification
| World Record | Alison Weisz (USA) | 635.3 | Lima, Peru | 8 November 2022 |
| European Record | Océanne Muller (FRA) | 634.2 | Hamar, Norway | 25 March 2022 |
| Games Record | Yulia Karimova (RUS) | 629.8 | Minsk, Belarus | 24 June 2019 |

== Results ==
=== Qualification ===
| Rank | Athlete | Country | 1 | 2 | 3 | 4 | 5 | 6 | Total | Notes |
|---|---|---|---|---|---|---|---|---|---|---|
| 1 | Sofia Ceccarello | Italy | 103.4 | 105.7 | 106.7 | 106.2 | 105.1 | 105.9 | 633.0 | Q, GR |
| 2 | Océanne Muller | France | 105.5 | 104.5 | 105.4 | 105.3 | 106.6 | 105.3 | 632.6 | Q |
| 3 | Jeanette Hegg Duestad | Norway | 104.8 | 105.5 | 104.6 | 105.5 | 104.0 | 106.5 | 630.9 | Q |
| 4 | Judith Gomez | France | 105.6 | 104.4 | 105.8 | 103.7 | 106.3 | 105.0 | 630.8 | Q |
| 5 | Nina Christen | Switzerland | 105.2 | 105.7 | 104.9 | 105.0 | 104.2 | 105.1 | 630.1 | Q |
| 6 | Kamila Novotná | Slovakia | 106.0 | 104.6 | 104.9 | 105.7 | 105.9 | 102.7 | 629.8 | Q |
| 7 | Olga Tashtchiev | Israel | 105.6 | 104.6 | 103.9 | 104.0 | 105.5 | 105.3 | 628.9 | Q |
| 8 | Lisa Müller | Germany | 104.7 | 104.4 | 104.2 | 103.8 | 105.3 | 105.6 | 628.0 | Q |
| 9 | Marlene Pribitzer | Austria | 104.6 | 104.8 | 105.1 | 104.2 | 104.4 | 104.9 | 628.0 | |
| 10 | Eszter Dénes | Hungary | 104.1 | 104.8 | 105.1 | 103.9 | 105.7 | 104.2 | 627.8 | |
| 11 | Aneta Stankiewicz | Poland | 104.1 | 106.0 | 104.9 | 104.8 | 105.1 | 102.9 | 627.8 | |
| 12 | Anna Janssen | Germany | 104.9 | 104.4 | 103.7 | 105.0 | 103.7 | 105.9 | 627.6 | |
| 13 | Laura Ilie | Romania | 105.0 | 104.7 | 104.2 | 104.4 | 104.9 | 104.1 | 627.3 | |
| 14 | Seonaid McIntosh | Great Britain | 104.3 | 105.2 | 105.2 | 105.2 | 102.9 | 104.4 | 627.2 | |
| 15 | Aneta Brabcová | Czech Republic | 104.8 | 105.0 | 104.0 | 105.0 | 105.2 | 103.2 | 627.2 | |
| 16 | Julia Piotrowska | Poland | 104.0 | 104.7 | 103.8 | 105.3 | 103.4 | 105.7 | 626.9 | |
| 17 | Živa Dvoršak | Slovenia | 104.0 | 104.8 | 104.8 | 105.6 | 103.3 | 104.4 | 626.9 | |
| 18 | Viktoriya Sukhorukova | Ukraine | 103.6 | 103.7 | 104.9 | 104.8 | 104.8 | 105.0 | 626.8 | |
| 19 | Ivana Maksimović | Serbia | 103.5 | 103.5 | 105.4 | 105.2 | 105.2 | 104.0 | 626.8 | |
| 20 | Urška Hrašovec | Slovenia | 103.0 | 104.2 | 103.9 | 104.2 | 105.9 | 105.2 | 626.4 | |
| 21 | Jenny Stene | Norway | 105.3 | 105.0 | 104.2 | 103.3 | 104.5 | 103.9 | 626.2 | |
| 22 | Teodora Vukojević | Serbia | 103.0 | 103.7 | 104.3 | 104.3 | 105.1 | 105.7 | 626.1 | |
| 23 | Roxana Sidi | Romania | 104.1 | 104.9 | 105.4 | 105.0 | 102.9 | 103.5 | 625.8 | |
| 24 | Chiara Leone | Switzerland | 101.7 | 105.7 | 104.7 | 104.3 | 104.1 | 104.7 | 625.2 | |
| 25 | Daniela Pešková | Slovakia | 102.5 | 103.8 | 105.1 | 104.6 | 103.5 | 105.4 | 624.9 | |
| 26 | Farah Onešćuk | Bosnia and Herzegovina | 104.6 | 103.0 | 104.4 | 103.9 | 104.8 | 103.9 | 624.6 | |
| 27 | Rikke Ibsen | Denmark | 104.2 | 104.3 | 103.2 | 104.2 | 104.4 | 104.1 | 624.4 | |
| 28 | Emmi Hyrkäs | Finland | 103.5 | 104.8 | 102.7 | 105.5 | 105.7 | 102.2 | 624.4 | |
| 29 | Eszter Mészáros | Hungary | 102.6 | 104.7 | 105.4 | 103.4 | 105.0 | 103.2 | 624.3 | |
| 30 | Paula Grande | Spain | 104.9 | 105.5 | 102.1 | 103.5 | 104.1 | 104.0 | 624.1 | |
| 31 | Anna Nielsen | Denmark | 103.7 | 104.1 | 103.9 | 104.6 | 103.4 | 103.5 | 623.2 | |
| 32 | Isabelle Johansson | Sweden | 105.6 | 102.3 | 105.4 | 103.0 | 104.0 | 102.7 | 623.0 | |
| 33 | Anastasija Mojsovska | North Macedonia | 103.4 | 102.8 | 103.0 | 105.3 | 103.1 | 104.0 | 621.6 | |
| 34 | Marta Zeljković | Croatia | 103.2 | 104.1 | 103.6 | 103.9 | 103.6 | 103.2 | 621.6 | |
| 35 | Jessie Kaps | Belgium | 103.8 | 104.9 | 101.1 | 104.3 | 103.6 | 101.6 | 619.3 | |
| 36 | Lucie Brázdová | Czech Republic | 104.6 | 102.1 | 99.5 | 102.5 | 102.9 | 102.5 | 614.1 | |
| 37 | Tal Engler | Israel | 102.8 | 101.7 | 103.0 | 98.4 | 102.1 | 102.1 | 610.1 | |

=== Ranking match ===
| Rank | Athlete | Series | | | | | Total | Notes |
| Rank | Athlete | 1 | 2 | 3 | 4 | 5 | Total | Notes |
|---|---|---|---|---|---|---|---|---|
| 1 | Kamila Novotná (SVK) | 52.3 | 52.7 | 52.6 | 51.4 | 51.8 | 260.8 | QG |
| 1 | Kamila Novotná (SVK) | 52.3 | 105.0 | 157.6 | 209.0 | 260.8 | 260.8 | QG |
| 2 | Nina Christen (SUI) | 52.3 | 52.3 | 52.7 | 51.0 | 52.0 | 260.3 | QG |
| 2 | Nina Christen (SUI) | 52.3 | 104.6 | 157.3 | 208.3 | 260.3 | 260.3 | QG |
| 3rd place, bronze medalist(s) | Océanne Muller (FRA) | 52.0 | 51.8 | 52.3 | 51.5 | 52.2 | 259.8 | |
| 3rd place, bronze medalist(s) | Océanne Muller (FRA) | 52.0 | 103.8 | 156.1 | 207.6 | 259.8 | 259.8 | |
| 4 | Sofia Ceccarello (ITA) | 51.8 | 51.9 | 51.5 | 51.9 | 50.0 | 257.1 | |
| 4 | Sofia Ceccarello (ITA) | 51.8 | 103.7 | 155.2 | 207.1 | 257.1 | 257.1 | |
| 5 | Jeanette Hegg Duestad (NOR) | 51.0 | 51.7 | 52.6 | 50.7 | | 206.0 | |
| 5 | Jeanette Hegg Duestad (NOR) | 51.0 | 102.7 | 155.3 | 206.0 | | 206.0 | |
| 6 | Olga Tashtchiev (ISR) | 50.8 | 51.9 | 51.6 | 51.3 | | 205.6 | |
| 6 | Olga Tashtchiev (ISR) | 50.8 | 102.7 | 154.3 | 205.6 | | 205.6 | |
| 7 | Judith Gomez (FRA) | 51.4 | 51.2 | 50.8 | | | 153.4 | |
| 7 | Judith Gomez (FRA) | 51.4 | 102.6 | 153.4 | | | 153.4 | |
| 8 | Lisa Müller (GER) | 49.2 | 49.8 | 52.0 | | | 151.0 | |
| 8 | Lisa Müller (GER) | 49.2 | 99.0 | 151.0 | | | 151.0 | |

=== Gold medal match ===
| Rank | Athlete | Shot | | | | | | | | | | | | | | | Total |
| Rank | Athlete | 1 | 2 | 3 | 4 | 5 | 6 | 7 | 8 | 9 | 10 | 11 | 12 | 13 | 14 | 15 | Total |
|---|---|---|---|---|---|---|---|---|---|---|---|---|---|---|---|---|---|
| 1st place, gold medalist(s) | Nina Christen (SUI) | 10.6 | 10.6 | 10.5 | 10.5 | 9.8 | 10.5 | 10.5 | 10.3 | 10.5 | 10.4 | 10.7 | 10.8 | 10.1 | 9.5 | 10.6 | 17 |
| 2nd place, silver medalist(s) | Kamila Novotná (SVK) | 10.3 | 10.1 | 10.2 | 10.3 | 10.2 | 10.6 | 10.7 | 10.3 | 10.4 | 10.7 | 10.2 | 10.7 | 10.3 | 10.5 | 10.5 | 13 |
