= Sambo at the 2019 European Games – Men's +100 kg =

Men's +100 kg at the 2019 European Games
- Venue: Minsk Sports Palace
- Date: 23 June
- Competitors: 8 from 8 nations

Medalists
gold medal	Beka Berdzenishvili	Georgia
silver medal	Yury Rybak	Belarus
bronze medal	Artem Osipenko	Russia
bronze medal	Vladimir Gajić	Serbia

The men's +100 kg sambo event at the 2019 European Games in Minsk was held on 23 June at the Minsk Sports Palace.

== Results ==
Legend

- VH – Total victory – painful hold
- VS – Total victory by decisive superiority

Quarterfinals
Beka Berdzenishvili (GEO)	2^{VH}
Gabriel Herbreteau (FRA)	0
Artem Osipenko (RUS)	1
Vladimir Gajić (SRB)	5
Yury Rybak (BLR)	8^{VS}
David Fernández (ESP)	0
Stanislav Bondarenko (UKR)	12^{VS}
Nikolas Papadopoulos (CYP)	4

Semifinals
Beka Berdzenishvili (GEO)	8^{VS}
Vladimir Gajić (SRB)	0
Yury Rybak (BLR)	7
Stanislav Bondarenko (UKR)	1

Final
Beka Berdzenishvili (GEO)	8^{VS}
Yury Rybak (BLR)	0

Repechage

Repechage
Gabriel Herbreteau (FRA)	0
Artem Osipenko (RUS)	5^{VH}

Third place
Artem Osipenko (RUS)	1
Stanislav Bondarenko (UKR)	0

Repechage
David Fernández (ESP)	5
Nikolas Papadopoulos (CYP)	0

Third place
David Fernández (ESP)	0
Vladimir Gajić (SRB)	6
