= Sambo at the 2019 European Games – Men's 90 kg =

Men's Sambo event

Men's 90 kg at the 2019 European Games
- Venue: Minsk Sports Palace
- Date: 23 June
- Competitors: 8 from 8 nations

Medalists
gold medal	Sergey Ryabov	Russia
silver medal	Andrei Kazusenok	Belarus
bronze medal	Dmitrij Gerasimenko	Serbia
bronze medal	Paata Gviniashvili	Georgia

The men's 90 kg sambo event at the 2019 European Games in Minsk was held on 23 June at the Minsk Sports Palace.

== Results ==
Legend

- VS – Total victory by decisive superiority

Quarterfinals
Sergey Ryabov (RUS)	4
Dmytro Stetsenko (UKR)	0
Miroslav Vacek (CZE)	0
Grigor Sahakyan (ARM)	8^{VS}
Andrei Kazusenok (BLR)	8^{VS}
Paata Gviniashvili (GEO)	0
Dmitrij Gerasimenko (SRB)	6
Valentin Jourdan (FRA)	0

Semifinals
Sergey Ryabov (RUS)	3
Grigor Sahakyan (ARM)	1
Andrei Kazusenok (BLR)	3
Dmitrij Gerasimenko (SRB)	0

Final
Sergey Ryabov (RUS)	3
Andrei Kazusenok (BLR)	1

Repechage

Repechage
Dmytro Stetsenko (UKR)	8^{VS}
Miroslav Vacek (CZE)	0

Third place
Dmytro Stetsenko (UKR)	0
Dmitrij Gerasimenko (SRB)	8^{VS}

Repechage
Paata Gviniashvili (GEO)	2
Valentin Jourdan (FRA)	0

Third place
Paata Gviniashvili (GEO)	4
Grigor Sahakyan (ARM)	3
