= Shooting at the 2020 Summer Olympics – Women's 50 metre rifle three positions =

Women's 50 metre rifle three positions at the Games of the XXXII Olympiad
- Olympic shooting pictogram
- Venue: Asaka Shooting Range
- Dates: 31 July 2021
- Competitors: 37 from 29 nations
- Winning score: 463.9

Medalists
1st place, gold medalist(s)		Nina Christen	Switzerland
2nd place, silver medalist(s)		Yulia Zykova	ROC
3rd place, bronze medalist(s)		Yulia Karimova	ROC

The women's 50 metre rifle three positions event at the 2020 Summer Olympics took place on 31 July 2021 at the Asaka Shooting Range.

== Records ==
Prior to this competition, the existing world and Olympic records were as follows.

Qualifying records
World record	Jenny Stene (NOR)	1185	Munich, Germany	28 May 2019
Olympic record	Not established	—	—	—

Final records
World record	Petra Zublasing (ITA)	464.7	Baku, Azerbaijan	19 June 2015
Olympic record	Barbara Engleder (GER)	458.6	Rio de Janeiro, Brazil	11 August 2016

== Schedule ==
All times are Japan Standard Time (UTC+9)

Date	Time	Round
Saturday, 31 July 2021	12:00	Qualification
Saturday, 31 July 2021	16:00	Final

== Results ==
=== Qualification ===
Rank	Athlete	Country	Kneeling	Prone	Standing	Total	Notes
1	Yulia Zykova	ROC	394	399	389	1182-78x	Q, OR
2	Sagen Maddalena	United States	394	399	385	1178-70x	Q
3	Jolyn Beer	Germany	392	396	390	1178-60x	Q
4	Yulia Karimova	ROC	394	394	389	1177-61x	Q
5	Andrea Arsović	Serbia	396	391	388	1175-59x	Q
6	Nina Christen	Switzerland	388	394	392	1174-61x	Q
7	Živa Dvoršak	Slovenia	390	398	385	1173-58x	Q
8	Jeanette Hegg Duestad	Norway	392	394	385	1171-65x	Q
9	Shi Mengyao	China	393	392	386	1171-57x	
10	Snježana Pejčić	Croatia	392	396	381	1169-52x	
11	Shiori Hirata	Japan	390	389	390	1169-49x	
12	Jenny Stene	Norway	390	390	388	1168-50x	
13	Mary Tucker	United States	387	394	386	1167-63x	
14	Seonaid McIntosh	Great Britain	390	391	386	1167-55x	
15	Anjum Moudgil	India	390	395	382	1167-54x	
16	Aneta Stankiewicz	Poland	389	394	384	1167-48x	
17	Maria Martynova	Belarus	387	395	384	1166-60x	
18	Najmeh Khedmati	Iran	388	391	386	1165-52x	
19	Chen Dongqi	China	392	395	378	1165-49x	
20	Bae Sang-hee	South Korea	390	392	382	1164-59x	
21	Sofia Ceccarello	Italy	384	396	383	1163-52x	
22	Fatemeh Karamzadeh	Iran	383	398	382	1163-50x	
23	Eglis Yaima Cruz	Cuba	393	394	376	1163-50x	
24	Nikola Šarounová	Czech Republic	388	395	378	1161-55x	
25	Sanja Vukašinović	Serbia	385	392	384	1161-54x	
26	Eszter Mészáros	Hungary	388	391	382	1161-48x	
27	Oyuunbatyn Yesügen	Mongolia	387	392	379	1158-45x	
28	Yarimar Mercado	Puerto Rico	389	390	378	1157-49x	
29	Rikke Ibsen	Denmark	387	384	386	1157-41x	
30	Mukhtasar Tokhirova	Uzbekistan	381	389	385	1155-50x	
31	Océanne Muller	France	383	389	383	1155-43x	
32	Cho Eun-young	South Korea	389	391	375	1155-40x	
33	Tejaswini Sawant	India	384	394	376	1154-50x	
34	Nur Suryani Taibi	Malaysia	379	395	368	1142-47x	
35	Alzahraa Shaban	Egypt	383	383	372	1138-36x	
36	Katarina Kowplos	Australia	386	388	363	1137-40x	
37	Vidya Rafika Toyyiba	Indonesia	371	391	375	1137-31x	

=== Final ===
Rank	Athlete	Series													Total	Notes
Rank	Athlete	Kneeling			Prone			Standing							Total	Notes
Rank	Athlete	1	2	3	4	5	6	7	8	9s41	9s42	9s43	9s44	9s45	Total	Notes
1st place, gold medalist(s)	Nina Christen (SUI)	51.3	102.3	152.9	204.8	257.2	308.5	359.5	411.4	422.2	432.6	443.3	453.7	463.9	463.9	OR
2nd place, silver medalist(s)	Yulia Zykova (ROC)	50.9	101.6	154.5	206.6	258.5	311.6	362.2	413.2	422.2	432.5	442.2	452.4	461.9	461.9	
3rd place, bronze medalist(s)	Yulia Karimova (ROC)	50.5	101.7	153.1	204.4	256.7	309.6	359.3	411.0	421.1	431.2	440.5	450.3	—	450.3	
4	Jeanette Hegg Duestad (NOR)	50.2	100.7	152.7	204.8	257.6	310.7	360.5	410.9	421.3	429.9	439.9	—		439.9	
5	Sagen Maddalena (USA)	49.8	102.3	153.5	204.4	256.3	308.9	358.9	407.9	418.3	427.8	—			427.8	
6	Jolyn Beer (GER)	51.8	103.5	154.0	204.8	256.0	307.3	357.8	408.7	417.8	—				417.8	
7	Živa Dvoršak (SLO)	50.5	99.5	151.6	204.5	255.4	307.0	356.4	406.2	—					406.2	
8	Andrea Arsović (SRB)	49.7	101.2	152.6	203.8	254.5	303.7	354.6	402.4	—					402.4	
