= Kamila Novotná =

Slovak sport shooter (born 2005)

Personal information
- Nationality: Slovak
- Born: 5 March 2005 (age 21) Veľký Šariš, Slovakia
- Height: 160 cm (5 ft 3 in)
- Weight: 45 kg (99 lb)

Sport
- Country: Slovakia
- Sport: Shooting
- Event: Air rifle
Medal record
European Games
Silver medal – second place	2023 Kraków-Małopolska	Women's 10 metre air rifle

Kamila Novotná (born 5 March 2005) is a Slovak sport shooter.

== Biography ==
Novotná was born on 5 March 2005 in Veľký Šariš. She has been representing Slovakia in air rifle since 2018. Her biggest career success has been attaining second place in Women's 10 metre air rifle at the 2023 European Games.

Novotná finished tenth place in the 2024 10m air rifle final with a score of 629.3 points. She went on to finish 44th place in the 10 m air rifle at the Olympic qualification in Rio de Janeiro, gaining 625.7 points.
