= Shooting at the 2019 European Games – Men's 50 metre rifle three positions =

Men's 50 metre rifle three positions at the 2019 European Games
- Venue: Shooting Centre
- Dates: 26 June
- Competitors: 34 from 22 nations
- Winning score: 461.6

Medalists
gold medal	Sergey Kamenskiy	Russia
silver medal	Yury Shcherbatsevich	Belarus
bronze medal	István Péni	Hungary

The men's 50 metre rifle three positions event at the 2019 European Games in Minsk, Belarus took place on 26 June at the Shooting Centre.

== Schedule ==
All times are local (UTC+3).

Date	Time	Event
Wednesday, 26 June 2019	09:45	Qualification
Wednesday, 26 June 2019	14:50	Final

== Records ==
Prior to this competition, the existing world, European and Games records were as follows.

Qualification
World Record	Yang Haoran (CHN)	1187	Munich, Germany	24 May 2018
European Record	Sergey Kamenskiy (RUS)	1187	Munich, Germany	24 May 2018
Games Record	Vitali Bubnovich (BLR)	1160	Baku, Azerbaijan	21 June 2015
Final
World Record	Yang Haoran (CHN)	465.3	Munich, Germany	25 May 2018
European Record	Alexis Raynaud (FRA)	463.5	Munich, Germany	23 May 2017
Games Record	Valérian Sauveplane (FRA)	456.2	Baku, Azerbaijan	21 June 2015

== Results ==
=== Qualification ===
Rank	Athlete	Country	Kneeling	Prone	Standing	Total	Notes
1	Sergey Kamenskiy	Russia	390	399	393	1182-72x	Q, GR
2	Filip Nepejchal	Czech Republic	392	393	393	1178-60x	Q
3	Yury Shcherbatsevich	Belarus	393	399	386	1178-60x	Q
4	István Péni	Hungary	389	398	390	1177-63x	Q
5	Tomasz Bartnik	Poland	392	394	390	1176-69x	Q
6	Serhiy Kulish	Ukraine	392	398	386	1176-61x	Q
7	Petar Gorša	Croatia	389	394	392	1175-64x	Q
8	Juho Kurki	Finland	389	397	387	1173-64x	Q
9	Simon Claussen	Norway	395	395	381	1171-55x	
10	Lorenzo Bacci	Italy	391	397	383	1171-49x	
11	Henrik Larsen	Norway	393	394	382	1169-59x	
12	Alexis Raynaud	France	388	396	385	1169-58x	
13	Milenko Sebić	Serbia	389	393	387	1169-56x	
14	Kirill Grigoryan	Russia	387	397	384	1168-67x	
15	Jan Lochbihler	Switzerland	389	397	382	1168-59x	
16	Alexander Schmirl	Austria	389	392	387	1168-58x	
17	Vitali Bubnovich	Belarus	387	393	388	1168-57x	
18	Christoph Dürr	Switzerland	390	396	382	1168-54x	
19	Péter Sidi	Hungary	386	389	391	1166-60x	
20	Maximilian Dallinger	Germany	384	395	385	1164-56x	
21	Steffen Olsen	Denmark	393	399	372	1164-56x	
22	Anton Rizov	Bulgaria	390	391	383	1164-52x	
23	Lazar Kovačević	Serbia	383	391	388	1162-49x	
24	Karolis Girulis	Lithuania	390	389	382	1161-49x	
25	Petr Nymburský	Czech Republic	385	394	381	1160-51x	
26	Bernhard Pickl	Austria	385	394	381	1160-46x	
27	Jury Sukhorukov	Ukraine	390	393	374	1157-44x	
28	Brian Baudouin	France	382	392	381	1155-47x	
29	Esben Jakobsen	Denmark	386	395	373	1154-56x	
30	Marcus Madsen	Sweden	389	383	380	1152-45x	
31	Riccardo Armiraglio	Italy	387	390	375	1152-45x	
32	Rajmond Debevec	Slovenia	385	392	372	1149-52x	
33	Hrachik Babayan	Armenia	382	385	375	1142-29x	
34	Matej Medveď	Slovakia	376	385	380	1141-40x	

=== Final ===
Rank	Athlete	Series													Total	Notes
Rank	Athlete	Kneeling			Prone			Standing							Total	Notes
Rank	Athlete	1	2	3	4	5	6	7	8	9	10	11	12	13	Total	Notes
1st place, gold medalist(s)	Sergey Kamenskiy (RUS)	52.7	50.7	51.2	51.2	51.2	52.6	51.5	50.8	10.0	9.6	10.4	10.0	9.7	461.6	GR
1st place, gold medalist(s)	Sergey Kamenskiy (RUS)	52.7	103.4	154.6	205.8	257.0	309.6	361.1	411.9	421.9	431.5	441.9	451.9	461.6	461.6	GR
2nd place, silver medalist(s)	Yury Shcherbatsevich (BLR)	51.3	51.2	51.1	52.4	52.7	52.5	49.7	49.6	10.0	10.0	10.2	10.1	10.1	460.9	
2nd place, silver medalist(s)	Yury Shcherbatsevich (BLR)	51.3	102.5	153.6	206.0	258.7	311.2	360.9	410.5	420.5	430.5	440.7	450.8	460.9	460.9	
3rd place, bronze medalist(s)	István Péni (HUN)	51.8	50.5	50.8	52.1	52.6	52.3	49.5	50.3	10.5	10.0	10.0	10.2		450.6	
3rd place, bronze medalist(s)	István Péni (HUN)	51.8	102.3	153.1	205.2	257.8	310.1	359.6	409.9	420.4	430.4	440.4	450.6		450.6	
4	Filip Nepejchal (CZE)	50.2	49.7	51.7	52.1	51.5	50.8	50.7	50.6	10.1	10.2	10.3			437.9	
4	Filip Nepejchal (CZE)	50.2	99.9	151.6	203.7	255.2	306.0	356.7	407.3	417.4	427.6	437.9			437.9	
5	Petar Gorša (CRO)	51.5	50.5	50.1	50.6	50.5	51.5	51.6	50.5	10.2	10.5				427.5	
5	Petar Gorša (CRO)	51.5	102.0	152.1	202.7	253.2	304.7	356.3	406.8	417.0	427.5				427.5	
6	Serhiy Kulish (UKR)	49.9	50.4	50.3	50.4	51.5	52.1	49.5	50.6	10.3					415.0	
6	Serhiy Kulish (UKR)	49.9	100.3	150.6	201.0	252.5	304.6	354.1	404.7	415.0					415.0	
7	Tomasz Bartnik (POL)	48.2	50.3	50.6	50.6	52.0	52.6	49.8	50.2						404.3	
7	Tomasz Bartnik (POL)	48.2	98.5	149.1	199.7	251.7	304.3	354.1	404.3						404.3	
8	Juho Kurki (FIN)	50.2	51.1	49.9	52.8	50.1	51.9	49.8	48.2						404.0	
8	Juho Kurki (FIN)	50.2	101.3	151.2	204.0	254.1	306.0	355.8	404.0						404.0	
