= Sanja Vukašinović =

Serbian sports shooter (born 1997)

Personal information
- Born: 22 October 1997 (age 29) Belgrade, Serbia, FR Yugoslavia
- Height: 1.59 m (5 ft 3 in)
- Weight: 45 kg (99 lb)

Sport
- Country: Serbia
- Sport: Sports shooting
- Events: 10 metre air rifle; 50 metre rifle three positions
- Club: Novi Sad 1790
- Coached by: Dragan Marković
Medal record
Women's shooting
Representing Serbia
European Junior Championships
Gold medal – first place	2016 Győr	10m air rifle team
Silver medal – second place	2017 Maribor	10m air rifle team
Silver medal – second place	2017 Maribor	10m air rifle mixed team
Silver medal – second place	2015 Maribor	50m rifle TP team
Bronze medal – third place	2015 Arnhem	10m air rifle team
Military World Games
Bronze medal – third place	2019 Wuhan	50m rifle TP

Sanja Vukašinović (Serbian Cyrillic: Сања Вукашиновић; born 22 October 1997) is a Serbian sports shooter. She finished in fourth place at the 2019 European Games in the Women's 50 metre rifle three positions earning a quota for Serbia for the 2020 Summer Olympics in Tokyo. At the Tokyo Olympics, she competed in the 50m Rifle 3 Positions event, finishing 25th, and in the 10m Air Rifle event, where she placed 44th.
