= Laura Ilie =

Romanian sport shooter (born 1993)

Laura-Georgeta Ilie
Personal information
- Born: 30 April 1993 (age 33) Bucharest, Romania
- Height: 160 cm (5 ft 3 in)

Sport
- Country: Romania
- Sport: Sport shooting
Medal record
Women's sport shooting
Representing Romania
World Cup
Gold medal – first place	2017 Munich	10 m air rifle
European Championships
Gold medal – first place	2019 Osijek	10 m air rifle
Gold medal – first place	2020 Wrocław	10 m air rifle
Gold medal – first place	2025 Osijek	10 m air rifle
Bronze medal – third place	2025 Osijek	10 m air rifle team
European Games
Gold medal – first place	2019 Minsk	10 m air rifle

Laura-Georgeta Ilie (born 30 April 1993), also known as Laura-Georgeta Coman, or Laura Coman, is a Romanian sport shooter. She won the gold medal in the women's rifle event at both the 2019 European 10 m Events Championships in Osijek, Croatia and 2020 European 10 m Events Championships in Wrocław, Poland.

In 2019, she won the gold medal in the women's 10 metre air rifle event at the European Games held in Minsk, Belarus.

She represented Romania at the 2020 Summer Olympics in Tokyo, Japan. She also competed at the 2023 European Games held in Poland.
