= Vladimir Gajić =

Serbian politician (born 1965)

- Владимир Гајић
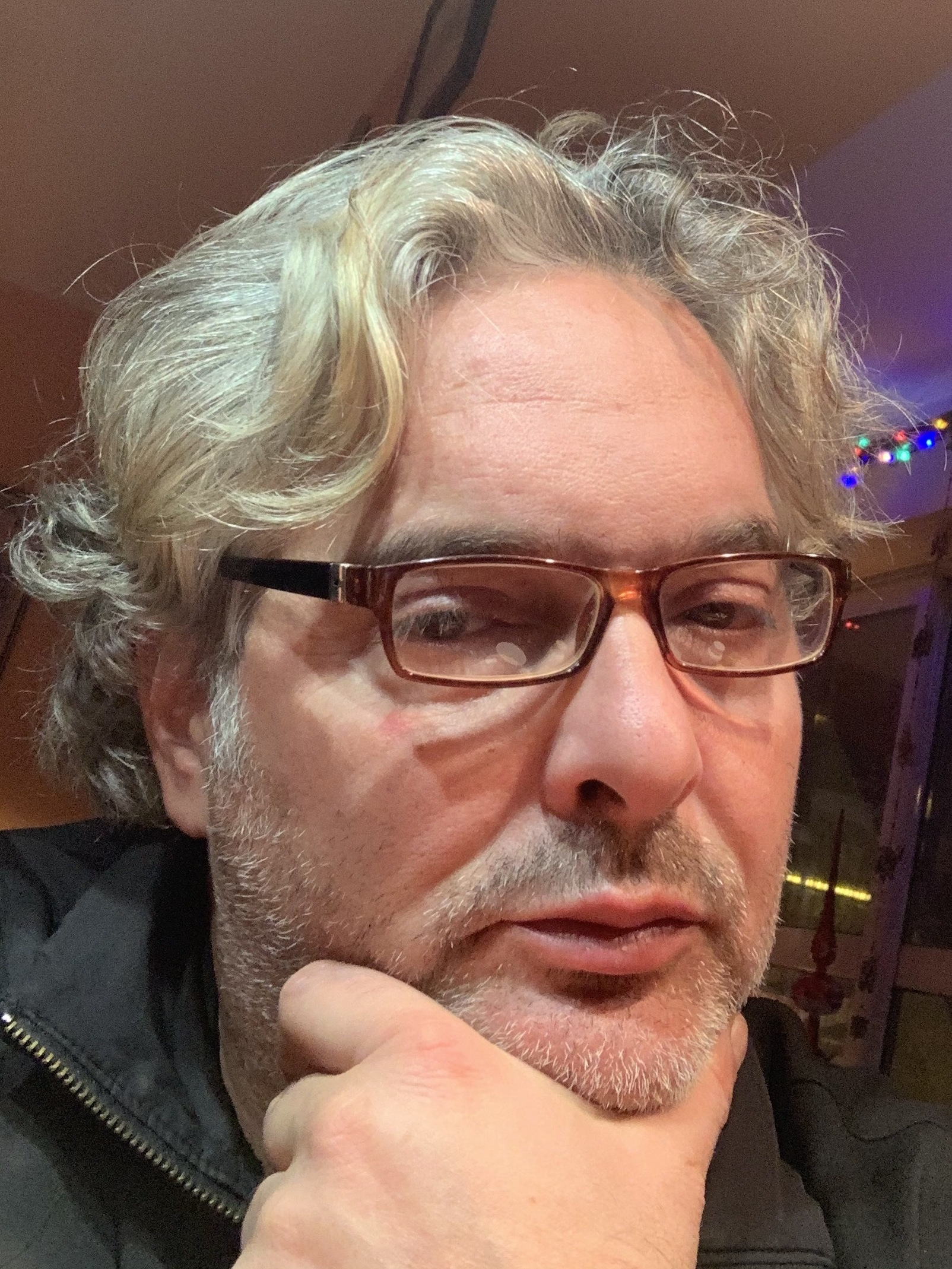

Member of the National Assembly
- Incumbent
- Assumed office 1 August 2022
- President: Vladimir Orlić

Personal details
- Born: 24 March 1965 (age 61) Marseille, France
- Party: Narodna (2017–present); DJB (2016–2017); DS (1995–1996); SPO (1990–1994)
- Education: University of Belgrade
- Occupation: Lawyer, politician

Vladimir Gajić (Serbian Cyrillic: Владимир Гајић; born 24 March 1965) is a Serbian lawyer and politician serving as a member of the National Assembly since 1 August 2022. He is a vice-president of the People's Party.

== Biography ==
Gajić was born on 24 March 1965 in Marseille, France. He graduated at the Faculty of Law, University of Belgrade in 1989.

He started his law career in 1992. Since then, he represented numerous public figures like Vuk Drašković, Zoran Đinđić, Nataša Kandić and Vesna Pešić.

He was the director of the company Internacional CG (former Geneks) and was arrested in a police operation in October 2007 together with several suspects accused of having damaged the state budget by more than 22 million euros. The higher prosecutor's office in Belgrade abandoned the criminal prosecution due to lack of evidence.

At the time of conflicts within the Belgrade Bar Association, he was elected as its president as the leader of one of the factions within the bar. His election was contested by the judgment of the High Court in Belgrade in July 2018, and the election of lawyer Jugoslav Tintor as president of the chamber was confirmed. Therefore, two factions of the chamber continued to exist, and Gajić continued to present himself as its president.

=== Political career ===
Gajić got involved in political life in early 1990s. From 1992 to 1994, he was the general secretary of the Serbian Renewal Movement (SPO). As a candidate on the electoral list of the Democratic Movement of Serbia (DEPOS), he was elected a federal MP following the 1992 Yugoslav parliamentary election.

After leaving SPO, he became a member of the Democratic Party (DS) and its Main Board in 1995, but left the party the following year.

He joined Saša Radulović's Enough is Enough (DJB) in 2016 and was its lawyer. As one of the leading people in the party, he performed the duties of a representative in the Republican Election Commission, a member of the Statutory Commission and a member of the Program Council. He left DJB in 2017 prior to the presidential election when he became a member of the team of presidential candidate Vuk Jeremić.

He continued his political engagement in the People's Party founded by Vuk Jeremić, where he became the president of its Legal Council. At the election assembly of the People's Party in December 2021, he was elected vice-president. Gajić is a critic of the European Union and he has described its policy towards Balkans as "imperialist".

He has been a member of the Crown Cabinet of Alexander, Crown Prince of Yugoslavia since 2001.
