= Polina Khorosheva =

Russian sport shooter (born 1992)

Personal information
- Nationality: Russian
- Born: 19 March 1992 (age 34) Kalininetz, Russia
- Height: 1.62 m (5 ft 4 in)
- Weight: 58 kg (128 lb)

Sport
- Country: Russia
- Sport: Shooting
- Event: Air rifle
- Club: CSKA
Medal record
World Championships
Bronze medal – third place	2018 Changwon	50 m team rifle 3 positions
European Games
Bronze medal – third place	2019 Minsk	50 m rifle 3 positions
Bronze medal – third place	2019 Minsk	50 m rifle prone mixed
European Championships
Gold medal – first place	2021 Osijek	50 m team rifle 3 positions
Military World Games
Gold medal – first place	2019 Wuhan	50 m team rifle 3 positions

Polina Alekseyevna Khorosheva (Russian: Полина Алексеевна Хорошева; born 19 March 1992) is a Russian sport shooter.

She participated at the 2018 ISSF World Shooting Championships, winning a medal. She also won a gold medal at the 2019 Military World Games.

At the 2021 European Championships she won gold in the 50m rifle three-position women's team, alongside Yulia Zykova and Yulia Karimova.
