= Sergey Kamenskiy =

Russian sports shooter

Personal information
- National team: Russia
- Born: 7 October 1987 (age 38) Biysk, Altai Krai, RSFSR, USSR (now Russia)
- Height: 1.77 m (5 ft 10 in)
- Weight: 65 kg (143 lb)

Sport
- Country: Russia
- Sport: Shooting
- Event: Air rifle
Medal record
Representing (Russia) ROC
Olympic Games
Silver medal – second place	2020 Tokyo	50 m rifle 3 positions
Bronze medal – third place	2020 Tokyo	10 m air rifle mixed
Representing Russia
Olympic Games
Silver medal – second place	2016 Rio de Janeiro	50 m rifle 3 positions
World Championships
Gold medal – first place	2018 Changwon	10 m air rifle
Gold medal – first place	2018 Changwon	50 m team rifle 3 positions
Silver medal – second place	2014 Granada	50 m rifle 3 positions
Silver medal – second place	2018 Changwon	10 m team air rifle
Bronze medal – third place	2014 Granada	50 m rifle 3 positions team
European Games
Gold medal – first place	2019 Minsk	50 m rifle 3 positions
Gold medal – first place	2019 Minsk	10 m air rifle mixed
Silver medal – second place	2019 Minsk	10 m air rifle
European Championships
Gold medal – first place	2015 Maribor	50 m rifle 3 positions
Gold medal – first place	2015 Maribor	50 m rifle 3 positions team
Gold medal – first place	2015 Maribor	50 m rifle prone team
Gold medal – first place	2016 Győr	10 m air rifle
Gold medal – first place	2016 Győr	10 m air rifle team
Gold medal – first place	2017 Maribor	10 m air rifle team
Gold medal – first place	2018 Győr	10 m air rifle team
Gold medal – first place	2020 Wrocław	10 m air rifle team
Gold medal – first place	2021 Osijek	10 m air rifle team
Gold medal – first place	2021 Osijek	50 m rifle 3 positions mixed
Silver medal – second place	2015 Maribor	50 m rifle prone
Bronze medal – third place	2017 Baku	50 m rifle prone
Bronze medal – third place	2021 Osijek	10 m air rifle mixed
Summer Universiade
Gold medal – first place	2013 Kazan	50 m rifle prone
Silver medal – second place	2013 Kazan	10 m air rifle team
Bronze medal – third place	2011 Shenzhen	50 m rifle 3 positions
Bronze medal – third place	2011 Shenzhen	50 m rifle 3 positions team
Bronze medal – third place	2013 Kazan	50 m rifle prone team

Sergey Igorevich Kamenskiy (Russian: Сергей Игоревич Каменский, IPA: [sʲɪrˈɡʲej kɐˈmʲenskʲɪj]; born 7 October 1987) is a Russian sports shooter. He competed in the men's 10 metre air rifle event at the 2016 Summer Olympics.

At the 2021 European Championships he won gold in the 50m rifle three-position mixed team with Yulia Zykova. She won silver in the individual match.
