= Dmitrij Gerasimenko =

Russian-Serbian judoka and sambo competitor

Personal information
- Born: 1 October 1987 (age 39) Zlatoust, Soviet Union
- Occupation: Judoka
- Height: 1.85 m (6 ft 1 in)
- Weight: 90 kg (198 lb)

Sport
- Sport: Judo; Sambo
- Club: Crvena Zvezda, Belgrade
Medal record
Sambo
Representing Serbia
World Championship
Bronze medal – third place	2018 Bucharest	90 kg
European Games
Bronze medal – third place	2019 Minsk	90 kg
European Championship
Bronze medal – third place	2018 Athens	90 kg
Men's Judo
Representing Russia
Universiade
Gold medal – first place	2009 Belgrade	90kg
Silver medal – second place	2009 Belgrade	Team
Bronze medal – third place	2007 Bangkok	90kg

Profile at external databases
- JudoInside.com: 38622

Dmitrij Gerasimenko (Serbian Cyrillic: Дмитриј Герасименко, Russian: Дмитрий Владимирович Герасименко; born 1 October 1987 in Zlatoust, Soviet Union) is a Serbian judoka and sambo competitor of Russian origin.

== Career ==
He won 2 medals at the 2009 Summer Universiade for Russia.

In 2011, he changed nationality and started to compete for Serbia. He won several medals for Serbia in international competitions. At the 2012 European Judo Championships he won 7th place and secured participation at the 2012 Olympic Games. At the 2012 Summer Olympics, he competed in the -90 kg category, beating Roméo Koné Kinapéya in the first round before losing to eventual silver medalist Asley González in the second.

In 2018, he won bronze medals at the European and World Sambo Championships in the -90 kg category, and in 2019, he repeated this achievement at the European Games in the same category.
