= Nina Christen =

Swiss sports shooter (born 1994)

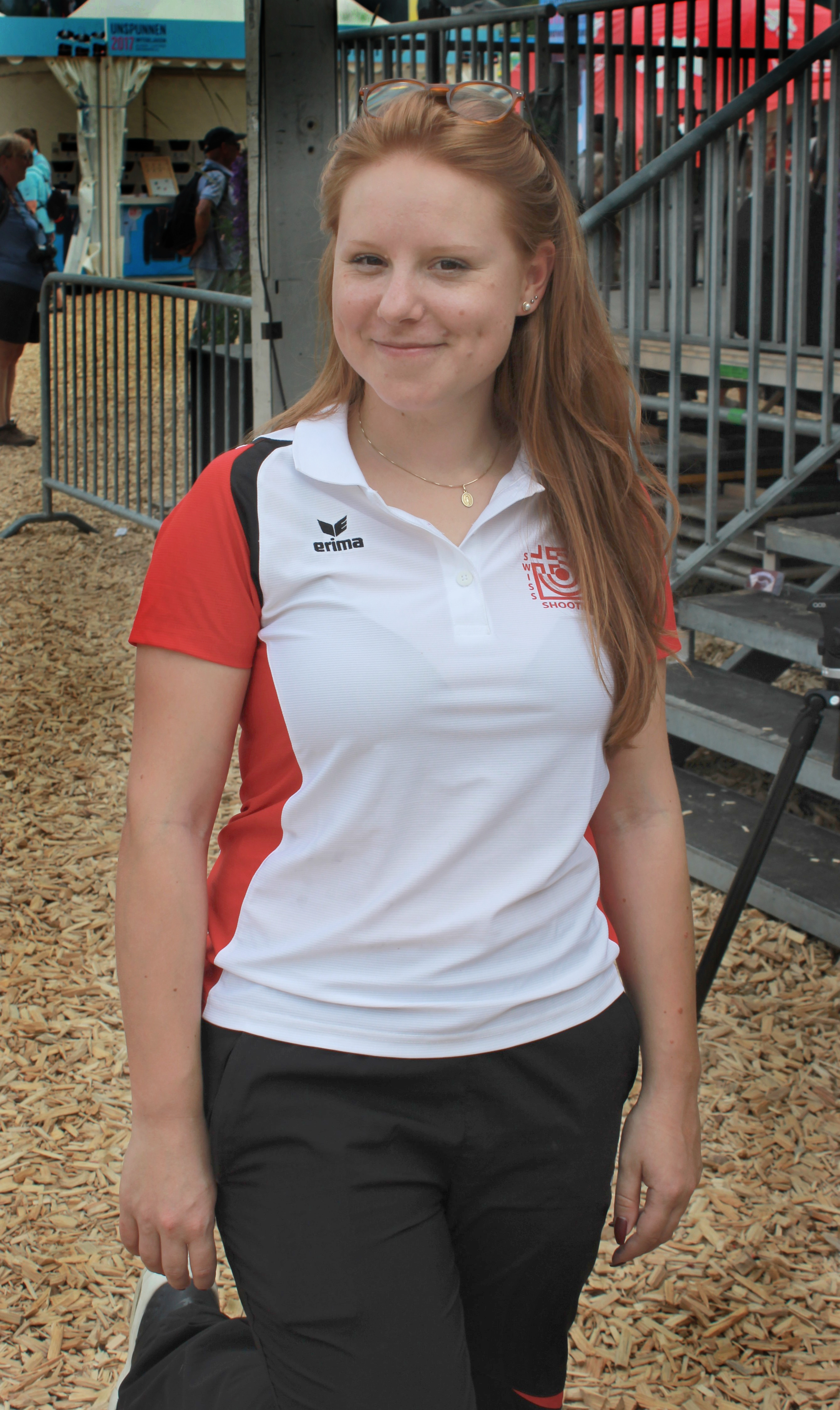
- Christen in 2017

Personal information
- Nationality: Swiss
- Born: 7 February 1994 (age 32) Stans, Switzerland
- Website: ninachristen.ch

Sport
- Country: Switzerland
- Sport: Sports shooting
- Coached by: Torben Grimmel; Daniel Burger
- Retired: December 2025
Medal record
Representing Switzerland
Olympic Games
Gold medal – first place	2020 Tokyo	50m rifle 3 positions
Bronze medal – third place	2020 Tokyo	10m air rifle
World Championships
Silver medal – second place	2014 Granada	50m rifle 3 positions junior
Silver medal – second place	2022 Cairo	50m rifle 3 positions team
Silver medal – second place	2025 Cairo	50 m rifle 3 positions team
European Games
Gold medal – first place	2019 Minsk	50m rifle prone mixed
Gold medal – first place	2023 Kraków-Małopolska	10m air rifle
Gold medal – first place	2023 Kraków-Małopolska	10m air rifle team
Gold medal – first place	2023 Kraków-Małopolska	50m rifle 3 positions mixed team
Silver medal – second place	2019 Minsk	10m air rifle
Silver medal – second place	2023 Kraków-Małopolska	50m rifle 3 positions team
European Championships
Gold medal – first place	2019 Bologna	50m rifle 3 positions
Silver medal – second place	2019 Osijek	10m air rifle

Nina Christen (born 7 February 1994) is a Swiss sports shooter. She competed at the 2016, 2020 and 2024 Summer Olympic Games. At the delayed 2020 Olympic Games in Tokyo, held in 2021, she won gold in the women's 50 metre rifle three-position and bronze in the women's 10 metre air rifle, becoming the first Swiss woman to win an Olympic gold medal in shooting. At the 2023 European Games she won three gold medals and a silver. Christen retired from competitive shooting in 2025.

== Shooting career ==
Christen joined the junior squad of the Swiss Shooting Federation in 2009. In 2011 she won her first Swiss national championship title. At the 2014 World Championships, she won silver in the junior women's three-position rifle event.

At the 2016 Summer Olympics, Christen finished 16th in the women's 10 metre air rifle. In the 50 metre three-position rifle event she qualified second and finished sixth in the final.

In 2019 she won her first ISSF World Cup medal at the Delhi World Cup, taking gold in the 50 metre three-position rifle. The result also earned her a quota place for the 2020 Summer Olympics.

At the delayed 2020 Summer Olympics in Tokyo, held in 2021, Christen became the first Swiss woman to win an Olympic gold medal in shooting when she won the women's 50 metre rifle three-position event with an Olympic record. She also won bronze in the 10 metre air rifle event. After her Olympic victory, Christen took a longer break from competition. She later began working with Danish coach Torben Grimmel.

At the 2023 European Games, Christen won three gold medals and a silver. The same year, she secured a quota place for Switzerland at the 2024 Summer Olympics in Paris. At the Paris Games, she carried the Swiss flag at the opening ceremony together with mountain biker Nino Schurter.

At the 2025 World Championships in Cairo, Christen won silver in the 50 metre three-position rifle team event with Emely Jäggi and Vivien Jäggi.

Outside competition, in 2022 Christen started training as a helicopter pilot. She obtained a private helicopter pilot licence in October 2025. She retired from competitive shooting at the end of 2025.
