= Anastasiia Galashina =

Russian sport shooter (born 1997)

Personal information
- Full name: Anastasiia Valeryevna Galashina
- Nationality: (Russia) Russian
- Born: 3 February 1997 (age 29) Yaroslavl, Russia
- Education: Yaroslavl State Pedagogical University

Sport
- Country: Russia
- Sport: Shooting
- Event: Air rifle
- Club: Central Sports Club of the Army
- Coached by: Svetlana Samukhina; Anna Malukhina
Medal record
Representing (Russia) ROC
Olympic Games
Silver medal – second place	2020 Tokyo	10 m air rifle
Representing Russia
World Championships
Bronze medal – third place	2018 Changwon	10 m air rifle mixed
European Games
Silver medal – second place	2019 Minsk	10 m air rifle mixed
European Championships
Gold medal – first place	2017 Maribor	10 m air rifle team
Gold medal – first place	2019 Osijek	10 m air rifle team
Gold medal – first place	2019 Osijek	10 m air rifle mixed
Gold medal – first place	2020 Wrocław	10 m air rifle team
Gold medal – first place	2021 Osijek	10 m air rifle team
Silver medal – second place	2020 Wrocław	10 m air rifle
Silver medal – second place	2021 Osijek	10 m air rifle mixed

Anastasiia Valeryevna Galashina (Russian: Анастасия Валерьевна Галашина, IPA: [ɐnəstɐˈsʲijə ɡɐˈlaʂɨnə]; born 3 February 1997) is a Russian sport shooter.

Her first major international achievement was a bronze medal at the 2018 ISSF World Shooting Championships.

On the 2020 Olympics, held in 2021, she won a silver medal in the 10 metre air rifle. In the qualification, she was the eighth, the last position which still let her to qualify for the finals. In the final, she was leading before the last shot, however, in the end earned second place, winning the first 2020 Olympic medal for the ROC.

Galashina took up shooting at age 12. She is married to Eduard Zulfugarov.
