= Yulia Karimova =

Russian sport shooter (born 1994)

Personal information
- Full name: Yulia Zakirovna Karimova
- Nationality: (Russia) Russian
- Born: 22 April 1994 (age 32) Izhevsk, Udmurtia, Russia

Sport
- Country: Russia
- Sport: Shooting
- Event: Air rifle
Medal record
Representing (Russia) ROC
Olympic Games
Bronze medal – third place	2020 Tokyo	10 m air rifle mixed
Bronze medal – third place	2020 Tokyo	50 m rifle 3 positions
Representing Russia
World Championships
Gold medal – first place	2018 Changwon	50 m rifle 3 positions
Bronze medal – third place	2018 Changwon	50 m rifle 3 positions team
European Games
Gold medal – first place	2019 Minsk	10 m air rifle mixed
European Championships
Gold medal – first place	2017 Maribor	10 m air rifle team
Gold medal – first place	2019 Osijek	10 m air rifle team
Gold medal – first place	2020 Wrocław	10 m air rifle team
Gold medal – first place	2020 Wrocław	10 m air rifle mixed
Gold medal – first place	2021 Osijek	10 m air rifle team
Gold medal – first place	2021 Osijek	50 m rifle 3 positions team
Bronze medal – third place	2015 Maribor	50 m rifle prone
Bronze medal – third place	2015 Maribor	50 m rifle prone team
Bronze medal – third place	2021 Osijek	10 m air rifle mixed
Military World Games
Gold medal – first place	2015 Mungyeong	50 m rifle prone team
Gold medal – first place	2019 Wuhan	50 m rifle 3 positions team

Yulia Zakirovna Karimova (Russian: Юлия Закировна Каримова, IPA: [ˈjʉlʲɪjə kɐˈrʲiməvə]; born 22 April 1994) is a Russian sport shooter of Tatar descent.

She participated at the 2018 ISSF World Shooting Championships, winning two medals, one of which was a gold medal in 50 m rifle 3 positions.

At the 2021 European Championships she won gold in the 50m rifle three-position women's team, alongside Yulia Zykova and Polina Khorosheva.
