= Yulia Zykova =

Russian sport shooter (born 1995)

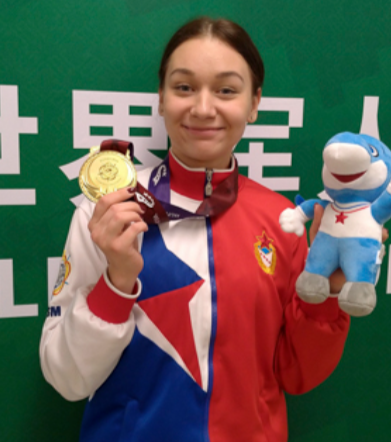

Personal information
- Full name: Yulia Andreyevna Kruglova
- National team: Russia
- Born: Yulia Andreyevna Zykova; 25 November 1995 (age 30) Krasnoyarsk, Russia
- Height: 1.70 m (5 ft 7 in)
- Weight: 58 kg (128 lb)

Sport
- Country: Russia
- Sport: Shooting
- Event: Air rifle
- Club: Dynamo
Medal record
Representing (Russia) ROC
Olympic Games
Silver medal – second place	2020 Tokyo	50 m rifle 3 positions
Representing Russia
World Championships
Bronze medal – third place	2018 Changwon	50 m rifle 3 positions team
European Games
Gold medal – first place	2019 Minsk	50 m rifle 3 positions
European Championships
Gold medal – first place	2019 Bologna	50 m rifle prone
Gold medal – first place	2019 Bologna	50 m rifle prone team
Gold medal – first place	2021 Osijek	10 m air rifle team
Gold medal – first place	2021 Osijek	50 m rifle 3 positions team
Gold medal – first place	2021 Osijek	50 m rifle 3 positions mixed
Silver medal – second place	2019 Bologna	50 m rifle 3 positions team
Silver medal – second place	2021 Osijek	50 m rifle 3 positions
Military World Games
Gold medal – first place	2019 Wuhan	50 m rifle 3 positions
Gold medal – first place	2019 Wuhan	50 m rifle 3 positions team

Yulia Andreyevna Kruglova (née Zykova; Russian: Юлия Андреевна Круглова; born 25 November 1995) is a Russian sport shooter. She participated at the 2018 ISSF World Shooting Championships, winning a bronze medal. At the 2020 Summer Olympics, taking place in Tokyo in 2021, Zykova qualified to the finals with the best score, and finished second in the final, taking home a silver medal.

At the 2021 European Championships she won gold in the 50m rifle three-position mixed team with Sergey Kamenskiy, and also in the 50m rifle three-position women's team, alongside Polina Khorosheva and Yulia Karimova. She won silver in the individual 50 m rifle three-positions event behind Sofia Ceccarello.
