= Maria Martynova =

Belarusian sports shooter (born 1997)

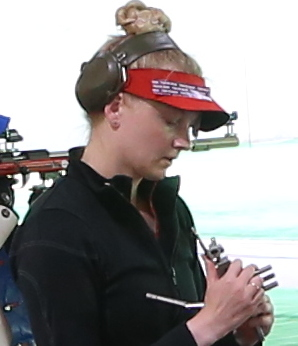
- Maria Martynova at the 2020 Summer Olympics

Personal information
- Nationality: Belarusian
- Born: 25 December 1997 (age 28) Minsk, Belarus

Sport
- Sport: Sports shooting

Maria Martynova (born 25 December 1997) is a Belarusian sports shooter. She competed in the women's 10 metre air rifle event at the 2020 Summer Olympics.

Her father, Sergei, is a 2012 Olympic Champion in the 50 m rifle prone event.
