= Franziska Peer =

Austrian sport shooter (born 1987)

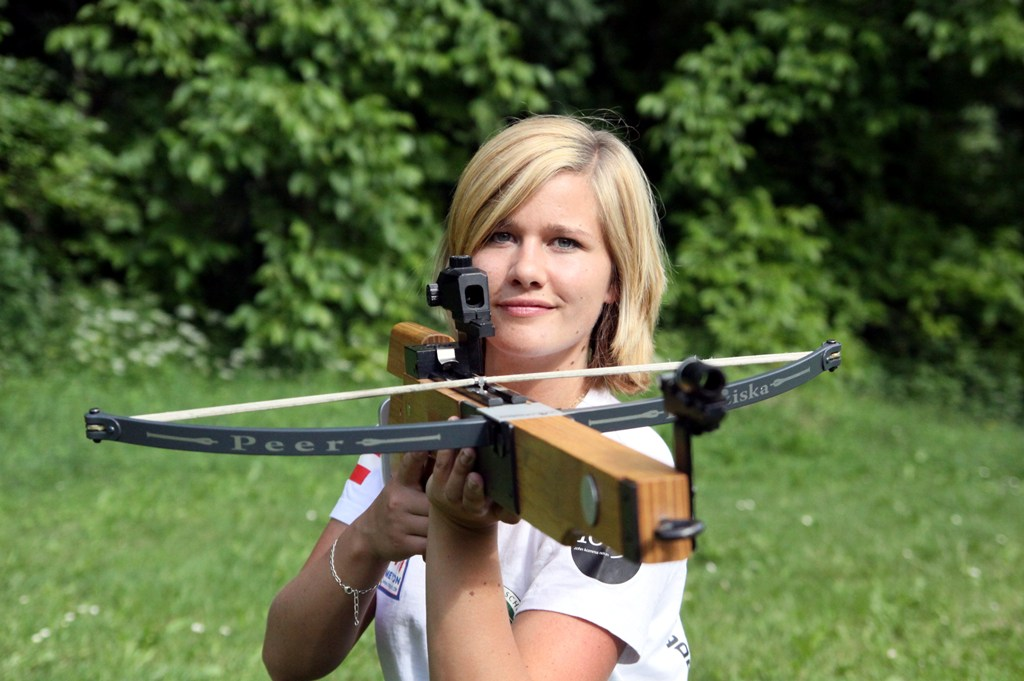

Personal information
- Nationality: Austrian
- Born: 6 May 1987 (age 39) Kufstein, Austria

Sport
- Country: Austria
- Sport: Shooting
- Event: Air rifle
- Club: Schuetzengilde Angerberg
Medal record
World Championships
Silver medal – second place	2018 Changwon	300 m team rifle 3 positions
European Championships
Bronze medal – third place	2017 Baku	50m rifle prone team
Bronze medal – third place	2021 Osijek	50m rifle three position team

Franziska Peer (born 6 May 1987) is an Austrian sport shooter.

She participated at the 2018 ISSF World Shooting Championships, winning a medal.

At the 2021 European Championships she won bronze in the 50m rifle three-position women's team alongside Sheileen Waibel and Olivia Hoffman.
