= Nikola Šarounová =

Czech sport shooter (born 1994)

Personal information
- Born: Nikola Mazurová; 22 November 1994 (age 31) Rychnov nad Kněžnou, Czech Republic

Sport
- Sport: Sport shooting

Nikola Šarounová, née Mazurová (born 22 November 1994), is a Czech sport shooter. She competed in the women's 10 metre air rifle event at the 2016 Summer Olympics.
