= Norway at the 2019 European Games =

- IOC code: NOR
- NOC: Norwegian Olympic and Paralympic Committee and Confederation of Sports
- Website: www.idrettsforbundet.no

in Minsk, Belarus 21 – 30 June 2019
- Competitors: 38 in 9 sports
- Medals Ranked 42nd: Gold 0 Silver 0 Bronze 2 Total 2

European Games appearances (overview)
- 2015; 2019; 2023; 2027

Norway competed at the 2019 European Games, in Minsk, Belarus from 21 to 30 June 2019. Norway has previously competed at the 2015 European Games in Baku, Azerbaijan, where it won 2 medals.

== Badminton ==
Athletes	Event	Group stage				Round of 16	Quarterfinals	Semifinals	Final	Rank
Athletes	Event	Opposition Score	Opposition Score	Opposition Score	Rank	Opposition Score	Opposition Score	Opposition Score	Opposition Score	Rank
Elisa Wiborg	Women's singles	Gilmour (GBR)	Tomalová (CZE)	Repiská (SVK)						
Sturla Flåten Jørgensen; Carl Christian Mork	Men's doubles	Ivanov / Sozonov (RUS)	Kaisti / Larkimo (FIN)	Janáček / Švejda (CZE)		—				
