= Basketball at the 2019 European Games – Men's tournament =

Basketball sporting event

Tournament details
- Host country: Belarus
- City: Minsk
- Dates: 21–24 June
- Teams: 16 (from 1 confederation)
- Venue(s): 1 (in 1 host city)

Final positions
- Champions: Russia (2nd title)
- Runners-up: Latvia
- Third place: Belarus
- Fourth place: Poland

The men's 3x3 basketball tournament at the 2019 European Games was held in Minsk, Belarus at the Palova Arena from 21 to 24 June 2019.

== Medalists ==
| Gold | Silver | Bronze |
| Russia; Ilia Karpenkov; Kirill Pisklov; Stanislav Sharov; Alexey Zherdev | Latvia; Armands Ginters; Roberts Pāže; Armands Seņkāns; Mārtiņš Šteinbergs | Belarus; Maxim Liutych; Mikita Meshcharakou; Andrei Rahozenka; Siarhei Vabishchevich |

== Pools composition ==
Teams were seeded following the serpentine system according to their FIBA 3x3 Federation Ranking as of 3 May 2019.

| Pool A | Pool B | Pool C | Pool D |
|---|---|---|---|
| Serbia (1) | Russia (2) | Slovenia (3) | Latvia (4) |
| Romania (14) | Ukraine (12) | Lithuania (11) | Netherlands (9) |
| Poland (15) | France (16) | Estonia (17) | Czech Republic (18) |
| Andorra (38) | Italy (28) | Belarus (23) | Turkey (20) |

== Team rosters ==
| Andorra | Belarus | Czech Republic | Estonia |
|---|---|---|---|
| Alexis Bartolomé; Oriol Fernández; Cinto Gabriel; Hugo Schneider | Maxim Liutych; Mikita Meshcharakou; Andrei Rahozenka; Siarhei Vabishchevich | Ondřej Dygrýn; Michal Křemen; Vladimír Sismilich; Daniel Zach | Kristjan Evart; Egert Haller; Renato Lindmets; Sander Viilup |
| France | Italy | Latvia | Lithuania |
| Anthony Christophe; Thomas Cornely; Mike Joseph; Raphaël Wilson | Davide Bovo; Stefano Masciadri; Anthony Raffa; Yancarlos Rodriguez | Armands Ginters; Roberts Pāže; Armands Seņkāns; Mārtiņš Šteinbergs | Mintautas Bulanovas; Medas Kuprijanovas; Aurelijus Pukelis; Paulius Semaška |
| Netherlands | Poland | Romania | Russia |
| Mack Bruining; Jaouad Darib; Jan Driessen; Lenno Witteveen | Maciej Adamkiewicz; Mariusz Konopatzki; Wojciech Pisarczyk; Michał Wojtyński | Barîs Aktaş; Radu Paliciuc; Ionel Petrache; Bogdan Sandu | Ilia Karpenkov; Kirill Pisklov; Stanislav Sharov; Alexey Zherdev |
| Serbia | Slovenia | Turkey | Ukraine |
| Marko Dugošija; Lazar Rašić; Nikola Vuković; Marko Ždero | Boris Jeršin; Mensud Julević; Milan Kovačević; Aleksander Vojičić | Onur Cumhur Aksoy; Eren Dekan Bayraktar; Abdullah Cem Koçal; Melih Kapucu | Yevhen Balaban; Andrii Kozhemiakin; Dmytro Lypovtsev; Oleksii Shchepkin |

== Preliminary round ==
=== Pool A ===
| Pos | Team | Pld | W | L | PF | PA | PD | Qualification | (Serbia) | (Poland) | (Romania) | (Andorra) |
|---|---|---|---|---|---|---|---|---|---|---|---|---|
| 1 | Serbia | 3 | 3 | 0 | 62 | 40 | +22 | Quarterfinals | — | 20–14 | 20–18 | 22–8 |
| 2 | Poland | 3 | 2 | 1 | 56 | 41 | +15 | Quarterfinals | 14–20 | — | 21–9 | 21–12 |
| 3 | Romania | 3 | 1 | 2 | 48 | 60 | −12 | | 18–20 | 9–21 | — | 21–19 |
| 4 | Andorra | 3 | 0 | 3 | 39 | 64 | −25 | | 8–22 | 12–21 | 19–21 | — |

Source: Minsk 2019
Rules for classification: 1) Wins; 2) Head-to-head record; 3) Points scored; 4) Higher seed.

=== Pool B ===
| Pos | Team | Pld | W | L | PF | PA | PD | Qualification | (Russia) | (France) | (Ukraine) | (Italy) |
|---|---|---|---|---|---|---|---|---|---|---|---|---|
| 1 | Russia | 3 | 2 | 1 | 64 | 51 | +13 | Quarterfinals | — | 21–22 | 21–14 | 22–15 |
| 2 | France | 3 | 2 | 1 | 58 | 52 | +6 | Quarterfinals | 22–21 | — | 14–18 | 22–13 |
| 3 | Ukraine | 3 | 2 | 1 | 53 | 51 | +2 | | 14–21 | 18–14 | — | 21–16 |
| 4 | Italy | 3 | 0 | 3 | 44 | 65 | −21 | | 15–22 | 13–22 | 16–21 | — |

Source: Minsk 2019
Rules for classification: 1) Wins; 2) Head-to-head record; 3) Points scored; 4) Higher seed.

=== Pool C ===
| Pos | Team | Pld | W | L | PF | PA | PD | Qualification | (Lithuania) | (Belarus) | (Estonia) | (Slovenia) |
|---|---|---|---|---|---|---|---|---|---|---|---|---|
| 1 | Lithuania | 3 | 2 | 1 | 57 | 47 | +10 | Quarterfinals | — | 19–13 | 21–13 | 17–21 |
| 2 | Belarus (H) | 3 | 2 | 1 | 49 | 43 | +6 | Quarterfinals | 13–19 | — | 21–14 | 15–10 |
| 3 | Estonia | 3 | 1 | 2 | 41 | 54 | −13 | | 13–21 | 14–21 | — | 14–12 |
| 4 | Slovenia | 3 | 1 | 2 | 43 | 46 | −3 | | 21–17 | 10–15 | 12–14 | — |

Source: Minsk 2019
Rules for classification: 1) Wins; 2) Head-to-head record; 3) Points scored; 4) Higher seed.
(H) Hosts

=== Pool D ===
| Pos | Team | Pld | W | L | PF | PA | PD | Qualification | (Latvia) | (Czech Republic) | (Turkey) | (Netherlands) |
|---|---|---|---|---|---|---|---|---|---|---|---|---|
| 1 | Latvia | 3 | 2 | 1 | 60 | 47 | +13 | Quarterfinals | — | 21–17 | 22–10 | 17–20 |
| 2 | Czech Republic | 3 | 2 | 1 | 57 | 50 | +7 | Quarterfinals | 17–21 | — | 22–13 | 18–16 |
| 3 | Turkey | 3 | 1 | 2 | 43 | 63 | −20 | | 10–22 | 13–22 | — | 20–19 |
| 4 | Netherlands | 3 | 1 | 2 | 55 | 55 | 0 | | 20–17 | 16–18 | 19–20 | — |

Source: Minsk 2019
Rules for classification: 1) Wins; 2) Head-to-head record; 3) Points scored; 4) Higher seed.

== Knockout round ==
=== Bracket ===
Quarterfinals
24 June
Serbia | 15
Belarus | 19
24 June
Latvia | 21
France | 14
24 June
Russia | 20
Czech Republic | 15
24 June
Lithuania | 16
Poland | 19

Semifinals
24 June
Belarus | 17
Latvia (OT) | 19
24 June
Russia | 17
Poland | 13

Final
24 June
Latvia | 14
Russia | 21
Third place
24 June
Belarus | 21
Poland | 15

=== Quarterfinals ===
24 June 2019
13:15

Boxscore

| Serbia | 15–19 | Belarus |
| Pts: Rašić 7 | | Pts: Rahozenka 8 |

Palova Arena

24 June 2019
14:15

Boxscore

| Latvia | 21–14 | France |
| Pts: Pāže 7 | | Pts: Joseph 7 |

Palova Arena

24 June 2019
15:40

Boxscore

| Russia | 20–15 | Czech Republic |
| Pts: Pisklov, Sharov 7 | | Pts: Dygrýn 8 |

Palova Arena

24 June 2019
16:05

Boxscore

| Lithuania | 16–19 | Poland |
| Pts: Pukelis 9 | | Pts: Wojtyński 9 |

Palova Arena

=== Semifinals ===
24 June 2019
18:50

Boxscore

| Belarus | 17–19 (OT) | Latvia |
| Pts: Liutych, Rahozenka 6 | | Pts: Ginters 7 |

Palova Arena

24 June 2019
19:15

Boxscore

| Russia | 17–13 | Poland |
| Pts: Pisklov 8 | | Pts: Adamkiewicz, Wojtyński 4 |

Palova Arena

=== Bronze medal game ===
24 June 2019
20:15

Boxscore

| Belarus | 21–15 | Poland |
| Pts: Meshcharakou 7 | | Pts: Adamkiewicz 5 |

Palova Arena

=== Final ===
24 June 2019
21:05

Boxscore

| Latvia | 14–21 | Russia |
| Pts: Šteinbergs 7 | | Pts: Karpenkov 9 |

Palova Arena

== See also ==
- Basketball at the 2019 European Games – Women's tournament
