= 2006 FIVB Men's Volleyball World Championship qualification (CEV) =

The CEV qualification for the 2006 FIVB Men's Volleyball World Championship saw member nations compete for nine places at the finals in Japan.

== Draw ==
35 CEV national teams entered qualification. The teams were distributed according to their position in the FIVB Senior Men's Rankings as of 15 January 2004 using the serpentine system for their distribution. (Rankings shown in brackets) Teams ranked 1–8 did not compete in the first and second rounds, and automatically qualified for the third round. Teams ranked 9–20 did not compete in the first round, and automatically qualified for the second round.

First round

Pool A	Pool B	Pool C	Pool D
England (—); Scotland (—); Northern Ireland (—)	Hungary (54); Slovenia (62); Moldova (62); Azerbaijan (—)	Belgium (54); Norway (54); Romania (62); Belarus (—)	Estonia (54); Israel (54); Bosnia and Herzegovina (62); Albania (—)

Second round

Pool E	Pool F	Pool G	Pool H
Bulgaria (15); Turkey (39); Slovakia (39); 1st Pool C	Czech Republic (16); Ukraine (39); Denmark (39); 1st Pool A	Portugal (20); Latvia (51); Austria (39); 1st Pool D	Germany (23); Finland (39); Croatia (32); 1st Pool B

Third round

Pool I	Pool J	Pool K	Pool L
Italy (2); Spain (14); 1st Pool F 2nd Pool H	Serbia and Montenegro (3); Greece (13); 1st Pool G 2nd Pool E	France (4); Netherlands (12); 1st Pool H 2nd Pool F	Russia (5); Poland (9); 1st Pool E 2nd Pool G

Playoff round

3rd Pool I
3rd Pool J
3rd Pool K
3rd Pool L

== First round ==
=== Pool A ===
- Venue: English Institute of Sport, Sheffield, England
- Dates: January 13–15, 2005
- All times are Greenwich Mean Time (UTC±00:00)

Pos	Team	Pld	W	L	Pts	SW	SL	SR	SPW	SPL	SPR
1	England	2	2	0	4	6	0	MAX	150	95	1.579
2	Scotland	2	1	1	3	3	3	1.000	131	119	1.101
3	Northern Ireland	2	0	2	2	0	6	0.000	83	150	0.553

Date	Time		Score		Set 1	Set 2	Set 3	Set 4	Set 5	Total	Report
13 Jan	14:00	England	3–0	Northern Ireland	25–13	25–16	25–10			75–39	Report
14 Jan	19:30	Scotland	3–0	Northern Ireland	25–14	25–17	25–13			75–44	Report
15 Jan	18:00	England	3–0	Scotland	25–16	25–22	25–18			75–56	Report

=== Pool B ===
- Venue: Sportcentrum, Tiszaújváros, Hungary
- Dates: May 13–15, 2005
- All times are Central European Summer Time (UTC+02:00)

Pos	Team	Pld	W	L	Pts	SW	SL	SR	SPW	SPL	SPR
1	Slovenia	3	3	0	6	9	2	4.500	267	236	1.131
2	Hungary	3	2	1	5	7	3	2.333	243	203	1.197
3	Azerbaijan	3	1	2	4	4	7	0.571	237	255	0.929
4	Moldova	3	0	3	3	1	9	0.111	198	251	0.789

Date	Time		Score		Set 1	Set 2	Set 3	Set 4	Set 5	Total	Report
13 May	15:30	Moldova	0–3	Slovenia	23–25	23–25	21–25			67–75	Report
13 May	18:00	Hungary	3–0	Azerbaijan	27–25	25–18	25–15			77–58	Report
14 May	15:30	Slovenia	3–1	Azerbaijan	25–16	25–17	22–25	25–20		97–78	Report
14 May	18:00	Moldova	0–3	Hungary	17–25	18–25	15–25			50–75	Report
15 May	15:00	Azerbaijan	3–1	Moldova	25–19	25–18	26–28	25–16		101–81	Report
15 May	17:30	Hungary	1–3	Slovenia	20–25	25–18	25–27	21–25		91–95	Report

=== Pool C ===
- Venue: Sports Hall Polivalentă, Tulcea, Romania
- Dates: May 6–8, 2005
- All times are Eastern European Summer Time (UTC+03:00)

Pos	Team	Pld	W	L	Pts	SW	SL	SR	SPW	SPL	SPR
1	Romania	3	3	0	6	9	2	4.500	268	230	1.165
2	Belarus	3	2	1	5	6	4	1.500	237	225	1.053
3	Belgium	3	1	2	4	6	6	1.000	282	276	1.022
4	Norway	3	0	3	3	0	9	0.000	171	227	0.753

Date	Time		Score		Set 1	Set 2	Set 3	Set 4	Set 5	Total	Report
06 May	16:00	Belgium	1–3	Belarus	22–25	25–23	21–25		92–99	160–172	Report
06 May	18:30	Romania	3–0	Norway	25–21	25–14	25–19			75–54	Report
07 May	16:00	Norway	0–3	Belarus	15–25	19–25	23–25		57–75	114–150	Report
07 May	18:30	Romania	3–2	Belgium	26–24	28–26	24–26	24–26	15–11	117–113	Report
08 May	16:00	Belgium	3–0	Norway	25–19	27–25	25–16			77–60	Report
08 May	18:30	Belarus	0–3	Romania	24–26	16–25	23–25		63–76	126–152	Report

=== Pool D ===
- Venue: Kalevi Spordihall, Tallinn, Estonia
- Dates: April 29–May 1, 2005
- All times are Eastern European Summer Time (UTC+03:00)

Pos	Team	Pld	W	L	Pts	SW	SL	SR	SPW	SPL	SPR
1	Estonia	3	3	0	6	9	0	MAX	226	150	1.507
2	Albania	3	2	1	5	6	5	1.200	231	255	0.906
3	Israel	3	1	2	4	4	6	0.667	215	230	0.935
4	Bosnia and Herzegovina	3	0	3	3	1	9	0.111	207	244	0.848

Date	Time		Score		Set 1	Set 2	Set 3	Set 4	Set 5	Total	Report
29 Apr	17:30	Estonia	3–0	Albania	25–21	25–7	25–12			75–40	Report
29 Apr	20:00	Israel	3–0	Bosnia and Herzegovina	25–16	25–23	25–18			75–57	Report
30 Apr	15:00	Israel	0–3	Estonia	13–25	23–25	15–25			51–75	Report
30 Apr	17:30	Bosnia and Herzegovina	1–3	Albania	23–25	21–25	25–18	22–25		91–93	Report
01 May	12:30	Albania	3–1	Israel	25–21	20–25	25–17	28–26		98–89	Report
01 May	15:00	Estonia	3–0	Bosnia and Herzegovina	25–18	26–24	25–17			76–59	Report

== Second round ==
=== Pool E ===
- Venue: DKS Arena, Varna, Bulgaria
- Dates: May 13–15, 2005
- All times are Eastern European Summer Time (UTC+03:00)

Pos	Team	Pld	W	L	Pts	SW	SL	SR	SPW	SPL	SPR
1	Bulgaria	3	3	0	6	9	1	9.000	247	197	1.254
2	Turkey	3	2	1	5	6	4	1.500	230	232	0.991
3	Romania	3	1	2	4	3	7	0.429	213	239	0.891
4	Slovakia	3	0	3	3	3	9	0.333	260	282	0.922

Date	Time		Score		Set 1	Set 2	Set 3	Set 4	Set 5	Total	Report
13 May	17:30	Bulgaria	3–0	Turkey	25–21	25–21	25–18			75–60	Report
13 May	20:00	Slovakia	1–3	Romania	25–13	22–25	25–27	17–25		89–90	Report
14 May	17:30	Slovakia	1–3	Bulgaria	22–25	11–25	25–22	21–25		79–97	Report
14 May	20:00	Turkey	3–0	Romania	25–23	25–21	25–21			75–65	Report
15 May	17:30	Bulgaria	3–0	Romania	25–14	25–22	25–22			75–58	Report
15 May	20:00	Turkey	3–1	Slovakia	20–25	25–23	25–21	25–23		95–92	Report

=== Pool F ===
- Venue: Opava Sports Hall, Opava, Czech Republic
- Dates: May 27–29, 2005
- All times are Central European Summer Time (UTC+02:00)

Pos	Team	Pld	W	L	Pts	SW	SL	SR	SPW	SPL	SPR
1	Ukraine	3	3	0	6	9	2	4.500	266	225	1.182
2	Czech Republic	3	2	1	5	7	3	2.333	239	204	1.172
3	Denmark	3	1	2	4	4	6	0.667	215	234	0.919
4	England	3	0	3	3	0	9	0.000	168	225	0.747

Date	Time		Score		Set 1	Set 2	Set 3	Set 4	Set 5	Total	Report
27 May	16:30	Czech Republic	3–0	England	25–20	25–17	25–18			75–55	Report
27 May	19:30	Denmark	1–3	Ukraine	14–25	25–21	24–26	22–25		85–97	Report
28 May	16:30	Denmark	0–3	Czech Republic	20–25	15–25	20–25			55–75	Report
28 May	19:30	Ukraine	3–0	England	25–19	25–20	25–12			75–51	Report
29 May	12:00	England	0–3	Denmark	23–25	16–25	23–25			62–75	Report
29 May	14:30	Czech Republic	1–3	Ukraine	25–19	22–25	19–25	23–25		89–94	Report

=== Pool G ===
- Venue: Pavilhão dos Desportos, Vila do Conde, Portugal
- Dates: May 20–22, 2005
- All times are Western European Summer Time (UTC+01:00)

Pos	Team	Pld	W	L	Pts	SW	SL	SR	SPW	SPL	SPR
1	Portugal	3	3	0	6	9	2	4.500	272	254	1.071
2	Estonia	3	2	1	5	7	3	2.333	249	214	1.164
3	Latvia	3	1	2	4	4	7	0.571	264	273	0.967
4	Austria	3	0	3	3	1	9	0.111	203	247	0.822

Date	Time		Score		Set 1	Set 2	Set 3	Set 4	Set 5	Total	Report
20 May	19:00	Latvia	0–3	Estonia	30–32	23–25	16–25			69–82	Report
20 May	21:30	Portugal	3–0	Austria	25–22	26–24	25–17			76–63	Report
21 May	16:45	Portugal	3–1	Estonia	25–22	17–25	25–23	25–22		92–92	Report
21 May	19:00	Latvia	3–1	Austria	25–23	25–20	21–25	25–19		96–87	Report
22 May	13:45	Austria	0–3	Estonia	22–25	14–25	17–25			53–75	Report
22 May	16:00	Portugal	3–1	Latvia	25–23	29–31	25–23	25–22		104–99	Report

=== Pool H ===
- Venue: Tampereen jäähalli, Tampere, Finland
- Dates: May 27–29, 2005
- All times are Eastern European Summer Time (UTC+03:00)

Pos	Team	Pld	W	L	Pts	SW	SL	SR	SPW	SPL	SPR
1	Finland	3	3	0	6	9	3	3.000	284	247	1.150
2	Germany	3	2	1	5	7	5	1.400	286	274	1.044
3	Slovenia	3	1	2	4	4	6	0.667	229	240	0.954
4	Croatia	3	0	3	3	3	9	0.333	251	289	0.869

Date	Time		Score		Set 1	Set 2	Set 3	Set 4	Set 5	Total	Report
27 May	18:00	Finland	3–0	Slovenia	25–21	25–20	25–21			75–62	Report
27 May	20:30	Germany	3–1	Croatia	25–20	27–25	23–25	25–17		100–87	Report
28 May	14:00	Slovenia	1–3	Germany	22–25	15–25	25–20	27–29		89–99	Report
28 May	16:30	Croatia	2–3	Finland	25–23	17–25	23–25	25–23	8–15	98–111	Report
29 May	14:00	Croatia	0–3	Slovenia	19–25	21–25	26–28			66–78	Report
29 May	16:30	Finland	3–1	Germany	23–25	25–18	25–23	25–21		98–87	Report

== Third round ==
=== Pool I ===
- Venue: Palavesuvio, Naples, Italy
- Dates: July 29–31, 2005
- All times are Central European Summer Time (UTC+02:00)

Pos	Team	Pld	W	L	Pts	SW	SL	SR	SPW	SPL	SPR
1	Germany	3	3	0	6	9	4	2.250	307	276	1.112
2	Italy	3	2	1	5	8	3	2.667	253	218	1.161
3	Ukraine	3	1	2	4	5	8	0.625	274	295	0.929
4	Spain	3	0	3	3	2	9	0.222	217	262	0.828

Date	Time		Score		Set 1	Set 2	Set 3	Set 4	Set 5	Total	Report
29 Jul	18:00	Germany	3–2	Ukraine	34–32	20–25	25–17	27–29	15–11	121–114	Report
29 Jul	20:30	Italy	3–0	Spain	25–18	25–19	25–22			75–59	Report
30 Jul	18:00	Spain	0–3	Germany	20–25	14–25	26–28			60–78	Report
30 Jul	20:30	Ukraine	0–3	Italy	13–25	24–26	14–25			51–76	Report
31 Jul	18:00	Ukraine	3–2	Spain	23–25	25–21	21–25	25–17	15–10	109–98	Report
31 Jul	20:30	Italy	2–3	Germany	18–25	25–18	25–22	18–25	16–18	102–108	Report

=== Pool J ===
- Venue: Neapolis Arena, Larissa, Greece
- Dates: July 18–20, 2005
- All times are Eastern European Summer Time (UTC+03:00)

Pos	Team	Pld	W	L	Pts	SW	SL	SR	SPW	SPL	SPR
1	Greece	3	3	0	6	9	2	4.500	273	245	1.114
2	Serbia and Montenegro	3	2	1	5	6	4	1.500	247	236	1.047
3	Portugal	3	1	2	4	5	6	0.833	240	244	0.984
4	Turkey	3	0	3	3	1	9	0.111	215	250	0.860

Date	Time		Score		Set 1	Set 2	Set 3	Set 4	Set 5	Total	Report
18 Jul	18:30	Turkey	1–3	Serbia and Montenegro	23–25	22–25	25–21	21–25		91–96	Report
18 Jul	21:00	Greece	3–2	Portugal	23–25	25–18	24–26	25–21	15–12	112–102	Report
19 Jul	18:30	Serbia and Montenegro	3–0	Portugal	30–28	25–15	25–20			80–63	Report
19 Jul	21:00	Turkey	0–3	Greece	22–25	23–25	27–29			72–79	Report
20 Jul	18:30	Portugal	3–0	Turkey	25–16	25–19	25–17			75–52	Report
20 Jul	21:00	Greece	3–0	Serbia and Montenegro	25–21	32–30	25–20			82–71	Report

=== Pool K ===
- Venue: La Palestre, Le Cannet, France
- Dates: July 28–30, 2005
- All times are Central European Summer Time (UTC+02:00)

Pos	Team	Pld	W	L	Pts	SW	SL	SR	SPW	SPL	SPR
1	France	3	3	0	6	9	2	4.500	272	209	1.301
2	Czech Republic	3	2	1	5	7	3	2.333	227	214	1.061
3	Netherlands	3	1	2	4	4	6	0.667	217	243	0.893
4	Finland	3	0	3	3	0	9	0.000	177	227	0.780

Date	Time		Score		Set 1	Set 2	Set 3	Set 4	Set 5	Total	Report
28 Jul	18:00	Czech Republic	3–0	Netherlands	25–18	25–20	25–18			75–56	Report
28 Jul	21:00	France	3–0	Finland	25–15	25–19	25–14			75–48	Report
29 Jul	18:00	Netherlands	3–0	Finland	25–18	27–25	25–22			77–65	Report
29 Jul	21:00	France	3–1	Czech Republic	19–25	25–20	25–18	25–14		94–77	Report
30 Jul	18:00	Czech Republic	3–0	Finland	25–23	25–21	25–20			75–64	Report
30 Jul	21:00	France	3–1	Netherlands	28–30	25–21	25–18	25–15		103–84	Report

=== Pool L ===
- Venue: Hala Podpromie, Rzeszów, Poland
- Dates: July 15–17, 2005
- All times are Central European Summer Time (UTC+02:00)

Pos	Team	Pld	W	L	Pts	SW	SL	SR	SPW	SPL	SPR
1	Russia	3	3	0	6	9	2	4.500	273	235	1.162
2	Poland	3	2	1	5	8	5	1.600	289	267	1.082
3	Bulgaria	3	1	2	4	4	6	0.667	239	245	0.976
4	Estonia	3	0	3	3	1	9	0.111	194	248	0.782

Date	Time		Score		Set 1	Set 2	Set 3	Set 4	Set 5	Total	Report
15 Jul	19:00	Estonia	1–3	Poland	25–23	16–25	18–25	20–25		79–98	Report
15 Jul	21:30	Bulgaria	0–3	Russia	37–39	24–26	23–25			84–90	Report
16 Jul	19:00	Poland	3–1	Bulgaria	25–16	17–25	25–22	25–17		92–80	Report
16 Jul	21:30	Estonia	0–3	Russia	18–25	11–25	23–25			52–75	Report
17 Jul	16:00	Bulgaria	3–0	Estonia	25–23	25–19	25–21			75–63	Report
17 Jul	19:00	Russia	3–2	Poland	25–21	25–16	23–25	20–25	15–12	108–99	Report

== Playoff round ==
- Venue: DKS Arena, Varna, Bulgaria
- Dates: August 19–21, 2005
- All times are Eastern European Summer Time (UTC+03:00)

Pos	Team	Pld	W	L	Pts	SW	SL	SR	SPW	SPL	SPR
1	Bulgaria	3	3	0	6	9	3	3.000	278	251	1.108
2	Portugal	3	2	1	5	6	5	1.200	261	250	1.044
3	Netherlands	3	1	2	4	6	7	0.857	291	286	1.017
4	Ukraine	3	0	3	3	3	9	0.333	257	300	0.857

Date	Time		Score		Set 1	Set 2	Set 3	Set 4	Set 5	Total	Report
19 Aug	15:30	Ukraine	1–3	Portugal	23–25	29–27	14–25	22–25		88–102	Report
19 Aug	18:00	Bulgaria	3–2	Netherlands	15–25	25–18	23–25	26–24	15–13	104–105	Report
20 Aug	18:00	Bulgaria	3–1	Ukraine	25–20	24–26	25–17	25–21		99–84	Report
20 Aug	20:30	Netherlands	1–3	Portugal	18–25	24–26	25–21	20–25		87–97	Report
21 Aug	15:30	Ukraine	1–3	Netherlands	18–25	21–25	26–24	20–25		85–99	Report
21 Aug	18:00	Portugal	0–3	Bulgaria	22–25	21–25	19–25			62–75	Report
