= 2006 FIVB Men's Volleyball World Championship qualification (NORCECA) =

The NORCECA qualification for the 2006 FIVB Men's Volleyball World Championship saw member nations compete for four places at the finals in Japan.

== Draw ==
20 NORCECA national teams entered qualification. The teams were distributed according to their position in the FIVB Senior Men's Rankings as of 15 January 2004 using the serpentine system for their distribution. (Rankings shown in brackets) Teams ranked 1–6 did not compete in the first round, and automatically qualified for the second round.

First round

Pool A (CAZOVA)	Pool B (ECVA)	Pool C (AFECAVOL)
Barbados (54); Netherlands Antilles (62); Jamaica (62); Cayman Islands (—); British Virgin Islands (—)	Anguilla (—); Dominica (—); Saint Lucia (—); Saint Kitts and Nevis (—); Trinidad and Tobago (—)	Costa Rica (—); Guatemala (48); Honduras (—); Nicaragua (—)

Second round

Pool D	Pool E
United States (6); Mexico (28); Puerto Rico (29); 2nd Pool C 1st Pool A	Canada (10); Cuba (18); Panama (35); 1st Pool C 1st Pool B

== First round ==
=== Pool A ===
- Venue: Garfield Sobers Gymnasium, Bridgetown, Barbados
- Dates: June 15–19, 2005
- All times are Atlantic Standard Time (UTC−04:00)

Pos	Team	Pld	W	L	Pts	SW	SL	SR	SPW	SPL	SPR
1	Barbados	4	4	0	8	12	1	12.000	324	253	1.281
2	Jamaica	4	3	1	7	9	3	3.000	287	228	1.259
3	Netherlands Antilles	4	2	2	6	7	6	1.167	293	274	1.069
4	British Virgin Islands	4	1	3	5	3	11	0.273	255	318	0.802
5	Cayman Islands	4	0	4	4	2	12	0.167	238	324	0.735

Date	Time		Score		Set 1	Set 2	Set 3	Set 4	Set 5	Total	Report
15 Jun	18:00	Cayman Islands	0–3	Jamaica	17–25	14–25	15–25			46–75	Report
15 Jun	20:00	Barbados	3–0	British Virgin Islands	25–20	25–22	25–18			75–60	Report
16 Jun	18:00	Netherlands Antilles	0–3	Jamaica	20–25	21–25	19–25			60–75	Report
16 Jun	20:00	Barbados	3–0	Cayman Islands	25–16	25–19	25–13			75–48	Report
17 Jun	14:00	Jamaica	3–0	British Virgin Islands	25–12	25–10	25–22			75–44	Report
17 Jun	18:00	Netherlands Antilles	3–0	Cayman Islands	25–13	25–23	25–15			75–51	Report
18 Jun	16:00	Netherlands Antilles	3–0	British Virgin Islands	25–22	25–19	25–11			75–52	Report
18 Jun	20:00	Barbados	3–0	Jamaica	25–17	25–19	28–26			78–62	Report
19 Jun	16:00	Cayman Islands	2–3	British Virgin Islands	11–25	25–14	21–25	25–20	11–15	93–99	Report
19 Jun	20:00	Barbados	3–1	Netherlands Antilles	25–16	25–18	20–25	26–24		96–83	Report

=== Pool B ===
- Venue: UWI Sport & Physical Education Centre, Port of Spain, Trinidad and Tobago
- Dates: May 25–29, 2009
- All times are Atlantic Standard Time (UTC−04:00)

Pos	Team	Pld	W	L	Pts	SW	SL	SR	SPW	SPL	SPR
1	Trinidad and Tobago	4	4	0	8	12	1	12.000	323	211	1.531
2	Saint Lucia	4	3	1	7	10	4	2.500	323	284	1.137
3	Saint Kitts and Nevis	4	2	2	6	6	9	0.667	301	338	0.891
4	Dominica	4	1	3	5	5	10	0.500	322	372	0.866
5	Anguilla	4	0	4	4	3	12	0.250	299	363	0.824

Date	Time		Score		Set 1	Set 2	Set 3	Set 4	Set 5	Total	Report
25 May	16:00	Saint Lucia	3–1	Dominica	25–13	23–25	25–21	25–16		98–75	Report
25 May	20:00	Trinidad and Tobago	3–0	Anguilla	25–12	25–15	25–15			75–42	Report
26 May	17:00	Anguilla	0–3	Saint Lucia	21–25	21–25	15–25			57–75	Report
26 May	19:00	Trinidad and Tobago	3–0	Saint Kitts and Nevis	25–16	25–13	25–14			75–43	Report
27 May	17:00	Dominica	3–1	Anguilla	25–20	27–25	22–25	33–31		107–101	Report
27 May	19:00	Saint Lucia	3–0	Saint Kitts and Nevis	25–22	25–15	25–17			75–54	Report
28 May	17:00	Dominica	1–3	Saint Kitts and Nevis	21–25	22–25	25–23	21–25		89–98	Report
28 May	19:00	Trinidad and Tobago	3–1	Saint Lucia	25–22	23–25	25–7	25–21		98–75	Report
29 May	17:00	Anguilla	2–3	Saint Kitts and Nevis	25–23	19–25	17–25	25–18	13–15	99–106	Report
29 May	19:00	Trinidad and Tobago	3–0	Dominica	25–16	25–20	25–15			75–51	Report

=== Pool C ===
- Venue: Polideportivo de Cartago, San José, Costa Rica
- Dates: May 20–22, 2005
- All times are Central Standard Time (UTC−06:00)

Pos	Team	Pld	W	L	Pts	SW	SL	SR	SPW	SPL	SPR
1	Costa Rica	3	3	0	6	9	2	4.500	258	211	1.223
2	Guatemala	3	2	1	5	8	4	2.000	271	255	1.063
3	Honduras	3	1	2	4	4	6	0.667	214	237	0.903
4	Nicaragua	3	0	3	3	0	9	0.000	185	225	0.822

Date	Time		Score		Set 1	Set 2	Set 3	Set 4	Set 5	Total	Report
20 May	17:00	Nicaragua	0–3	Honduras	21–25	23–25	19–25			63–75	Report
20 May	19:00	Costa Rica	3–2	Guatemala	25–18	23–25	25–16	20–25	15–13	108–97	Report
21 May	17:00	Honduras	1–3	Guatemala	16–25	26–24	20–25	20–25		82–99	Report
21 May	19:00	Costa Rica	3–0	Nicaragua	25–19	25–19	25–19			75–57	Report
22 May	17:00	Guatemala	3–0	Nicaragua	25–21	25–21	25–23			75–65	Report
22 May	19:00	Costa Rica	3–0	Honduras	25–19	25–22	25–16			75–57	Report

== Second round ==
=== Pool D ===
- Venue: Coliseo Héctor Solá Bezares, Caguas, Puerto Rico
- Dates: August 22–28, 2005
- All times are Atlantic Standard Time (UTC−04:00)

==== Preliminary round ====
Pos	Team	Pld	W	L	Pts	SW	SL	SR	SPW	SPL	SPR
1	United States	4	4	0	8	12	0	MAX	301	200	1.505
2	Puerto Rico	4	3	1	7	9	3	3.000	292	235	1.243
3	Mexico	4	2	2	6	6	6	1.000	273	240	1.138
4	Guatemala	4	1	3	5	3	10	0.300	212	314	0.675
5	Barbados	4	0	4	4	1	12	0.083	230	319	0.721

Date	Time		Score		Set 1	Set 2	Set 3	Set 4	Set 5	Total	Report
22 Aug	17:00	Mexico	3–0	Guatemala	25–13	25–14	25–11			75–38	Report
22 Aug	20:00	Puerto Rico	0–3	United States	20–25	24–26	22–25			66–76	Report
23 Aug	18:00	United States	3–0	Guatemala	25–10	25–13	25–10			75–33	Report
23 Aug	20:00	Puerto Rico	3–0	Barbados	25–17	25–16	25–16			75–49	Report
24 Aug	18:00	Mexico	3–0	Barbados	25–16	25–14	25–21			75–51	Report
24 Aug	20:00	Puerto Rico	3–0	Guatemala	25–16	25–14	25–17			75–47	Report
25 Aug	18:00	United States	3–0	Barbados	25–18	25–10	25–13			75–41	Report
25 Aug	20:00	Puerto Rico	3–0	Mexico	25–16	25–23	26–24			76–63	Report
26 Aug	18:00	Guatemala	3–1	Barbados	25–20	19–25	25–22	25–22		94–89	Report
26 Aug	20:00	Mexico	0–3	United States	19–25	20–25	21–25			60–75	Report

==== Final round ====
===== Semifinals =====
Date	Time		Score		Set 1	Set 2	Set 3	Set 4	Set 5	Total	Report
27 Aug	18:00	United States	3–0	Guatemala	25–14	25–16	25–9			75–39	Report
27 Aug	20:00	Mexico	0–3	Puerto Rico	20–25	24–26	23–25			67–76	Report

===== 3rd place =====
Date	Time		Score		Set 1	Set 2	Set 3	Set 4	Set 5	Total	Report
28 Aug	18:00	Guatemala	0–3	Mexico	21–25	17–25	16–25			54–75	Report

===== Final =====
Date	Time		Score		Set 1	Set 2	Set 3	Set 4	Set 5	Total	Report
28 Aug	20:00	United States	3–0	Puerto Rico	25–22	25–12	25–21			75–55	Report

==== Final standing ====
Rank	Team
1	United States
2	Puerto Rico
3	Mexico
4	Guatemala
5	Barbados

=== Pool E ===
- Venue: Sala Ramón Fonst, Havana, Cuba
- Dates: August 17–21, 2005
- All times are Cuba Daylight Time (UTC−04:00)

Pos	Team	Pld	W	L	Pts	SW	SL	SR	SPW	SPL	SPR
1	Cuba	4	4	0	8	12	0	MAX	304	214	1.421
2	Canada	4	3	1	7	9	3	3.000	294	218	1.349
3	Panama	4	2	2	6	6	8	0.750	268	311	0.862
4	Trinidad and Tobago	4	1	3	5	5	11	0.455	296	359	0.825
5	Costa Rica	4	0	4	4	2	12	0.167	265	325	0.815

Date	Time		Score		Set 1	Set 2	Set 3	Set 4	Set 5	Total	Report
17 Aug	16:00	Canada	3–0	Panama	25–18	25–11	25–17			75–46	Report
17 Aug	18:00	Trinidad and Tobago	0–3	Cuba	19–25	20–25	16–25			55–75	Report
18 Aug	16:00	Canada	3–0	Trinidad and Tobago	25–18	25–11	25–13			75–42	Report
18 Aug	18:00	Panama	3–0	Costa Rica	25–21	25–19	25–22			75–62	Report
19 Aug	16:00	Trinidad and Tobago	2–3	Panama	19–25	25–23	16–25	25–8	14–16	99–97	Report
19 Aug	18:00	Cuba	3–0	Costa Rica	25–8	25–18	25–14			75–40	Report
20 Aug	16:00	Costa Rica	0–3	Canada	16–25	15–25	20–25			51–75	Report
20 Aug	18:00	Cuba	3–0	Panama	25–15	25–13	25–22			75–50	Report
21 Aug	14:00	Cuba	3–0	Canada	25–23	29–27	25–19			79–69	Report
21 Aug	16:00	Costa Rica	2–3	Trinidad and Tobago	25–16	27–29	23–25	25–15	12–15	112–100	Report
