= Basketball at the 2019 European Games – Women's tournament =

Tournament details
- Host country: Belarus
- City: Minsk
- Dates: 21–24 June
- Teams: 16 (from 1 confederation)
- Venue: 1 (in 1 host city)

Final positions
- Champions: France (1st title)
- Runners-up: Estonia
- Third place: Belarus
- Fourth place: Germany

The women's 3x3 basketball tournament at the 2019 European Games was held in Minsk, Belarus at the Palova Arena from 21 to 24 June 2019.

== Medalists ==
Gold	Silver	Bronze
France; Mousdandy Djaldi-Tabdi; Caroline Hériaud; Assitan Koné; Johanna Tayeau	Estonia; Merike Anderson; Annika Köster; Kadri-Ann Lass; Janne Pulk	Belarus; Natallia Dashkevich; Maryna Ivashchanka; Darya Mahalias; Anastasiya Sushczyk

== Pools composition ==
Teams were seeded following the serpentine system according to their FIBA 3x3 Federation Ranking as of 3 May 2019.

Pool A	Pool B	Pool C	Pool D
Russia (3)	Romania (4)	France (5)	Estonia (6)
Italy (14)	Hungary (10)	Netherlands (9)	Ukraine (8)
Belarus (15)	Czech Republic (16)	Switzerland (17)	Latvia (19)
Serbia (32)	Germany (28)	Andorra (25)	Spain (22)

== Team rosters ==
Andorra	Belarus	Czech Republic	Estonia
Cristina Andrés; Clàudia Brunet; Anna Mañà; Alba Pla	Natallia Dashkevich; Maryna Ivashchanka; Darya Mahalias; Anastasiya Sushczyk	Denisa Harapesová; Kamila Hošková; Alžběta Levínská; Monika Satoranská	Merike Anderson; Annika Köster; Kadri-Ann Lass; Janne Pulk
France	Germany	Hungary	Italy
Mousdandy Djaldi-Tabdi; Caroline Hériaud; Assitan Koné; Johanna Tayeau	Svenja Brunckhorst; Ama Degbeon; Sonja Greinacher; Satou Sabally	Sára Benke; Vivien Böröndy; Zsófia Jáhni	Paola Contu; Flavia De Cassan; Arianna Landi; Francesca Romana Russo
Latvia	Netherlands	Romania	Russia
Anete Blūma; Ligita Līga Golovko; Felicita Liepiņa-Liepa; Laura Okuņeva	Janis Boonstra; Laura Cornelius; Janine Guijt; Rowie Jongeling	Ruxandra Chiș; Andreea Lazăr; Elisabeth Pavel; Alexandra Uiuiu	Yulia Kozik; Ekaterina Polyashova; Anna Pozdnyakova; Anastasiia Shuvagina
Serbia	Spain	Switzerland	Ukraine
Mirjana Beronja; Dragana Gobeljić; Jefimija Karakašević; Tamara Rajić	Marta Canella; Yurena Díaz; Nogaye Lo; Helena Oma	Tamara Détraz; Belinda Mensah; Eva Ruga; Cinzia Tomezzoli	Veronika Kosmach; Ganna Rulyova; Yevheniia Spitkovska; Tetyana Yurkevichus

== Preliminary round ==
=== Pool A ===
Pos	Team	Pld	W	L	PF	PA	PD	Qualification	(Belarus)	(Russia)	(Serbia)	(Italy)
1	Belarus (H)	3	2	1	57	44	+13	Quarterfinals	—	21–16	15–21	21–7
2	Russia	3	2	1	52	32	+20	Quarterfinals	16–21	—	15–9	21–2
3	Serbia	3	2	1	48	47	+1		21–15	9–15	—	18–17
4	Italy	3	0	3	26	60	−34		7–21	2–21	17–18	—

Source: Minsk 2019
Rules for classification: 1) Wins; 2) Head-to-head record; 3) Points scored; 4) Higher seed.
(H) Hosts

=== Pool B ===
Pos	Team	Pld	W	L	PF	PA	PD	Qualification	(Germany)	(Czech Republic)	(Romania)	(Hungary)
1	Germany	3	3	0	61	31	+30	Quarterfinals	—	21–14	21–8	19–9
2	Czech Republic	3	2	1	55	43	+12	Quarterfinals	14–21	—	21–3	20–19
3	Romania	3	1	2	31	60	−29		8–21	3–21	—	20–18
4	Hungary	3	0	3	46	59	−13		9–19	19–20	18–20	—

Source: Minsk 2019
Rules for classification: 1) Wins; 2) Head-to-head record; 3) Points scored; 4) Higher seed.

=== Pool C ===
Pos	Team	Pld	W	L	PF	PA	PD	Qualification	(France)	(Netherlands)	(Switzerland)	(Andorra)
1	France	3	3	0	59	24	+35	Quarterfinals	—	18–8	21–7	20–9
2	Netherlands	3	2	1	42	39	+3	Quarterfinals	8–18	—	18–14	16–7
3	Switzerland	3	1	2	39	44	−5		7–21	14–18	—	18–5
4	Andorra	3	0	3	21	54	−33		9–20	7–16	5–18	—

Source: Minsk 2019
Rules for classification: 1) Wins; 2) Head-to-head record; 3) Points scored; 4) Higher seed.

=== Pool D ===
Pos	Team	Pld	W	L	PF	PA	PD	Qualification	(Estonia)	(Spain)	(Ukraine)	(Latvia)
1	Estonia	3	2	1	55	38	+17	Quarterfinals	—	13–15	20–17	22–6
2	Spain	3	2	1	52	35	+17	Quarterfinals	15–13	—	15–17	22–5
3	Ukraine	3	2	1	48	43	+5		17–20	17–15	—	14–8
4	Latvia	3	0	3	19	58	−39		6–22	5–22	8–14	—

Source: Minsk 2019
Rules for classification: 1) Wins; 2) Head-to-head record; 3) Points scored; 4) Higher seed.

== Knockout round ==
=== Bracket ===
Quarterfinals
24 June
Belarus	15
Netherlands	11
24 June
Estonia	15
Czech Republic	12
24 June
Germany	20
Spain	11
24 June
France	20
Russia	13

Semifinals
24 June
Belarus	14
Estonia	15
24 June
Germany	10
France	11

Final
24 June
Estonia	8
France	21
Third place
24 June
Belarus	21
Germany	16

=== Quarterfinals ===
24 June 2019
13:00

Boxscore

Belarus	15–11	Netherlands
Pts: Dashkevich 10		Pts: Guijt 5

Palova Arena

24 June 2019
13:25

Boxscore

Estonia	15–12	Czech Republic
Pts: Anderson 6		Pts: Harapesová 5

Palova Arena

24 June 2019
14:50

Boxscore

Germany	20–11	Spain
Pts: Sabally 12		Pts: Lo 6

Palova Arena

24 June 2019
15:15

Boxscore

France	20–13	Russia
Pts: Hériaud 6		Pts: Polyashova 6

Palova Arena

=== Semifinals ===
24 June 2019
18:00

Boxscore

Belarus	14–15	Estonia
Pts: Dashkevich 7		Pts: Pulk 8

Palova Arena

24 June 2019
18:25

Boxscore

Germany	10–11	France
Pts: Sabally 6		Pts: three players 3

Palova Arena

=== Bronze medal game ===
24 June 2019
19:50

Boxscore

Belarus	21–16	Germany
Pts: Dashkevich 8		Pts: Brunckhorst, Degbeon 5

Palova Arena

=== Final ===
24 June 2019
20:40

Boxscore

Estonia	8–21	France
Pts: Pulk 4		Pts: Koné 7

Palova Arena

== See also ==
- Basketball at the 2019 European Games – Men's tournament
