= 2006 FIVB Men's Volleyball World Championship qualification (AVC) =

- Dates: 2 March 2005 – 19 July 2005
- Teams: 21 (from 1 confederation)

The AVC qualification for the 2006 FIVB Men's Volleyball World Championship saw member nations compete for five places at the finals in Japan.

== Draw ==
21 AVC national teams entered qualification. (Saudi Arabia later withdrew) The teams were distributed according to their position in the FIVB Senior Men's Rankings as of 15 January 2004 using the serpentine system for their distribution. (Rankings shown in brackets) Teams ranked 1–6 did not compete in the first round, and automatically qualified for the second round.

First round

Pool A (West)	Pool B (Central)	Pool C (East)
Qatar (51); Jordan (—); Oman (—); United Arab Emirates (—); Maldives (—)	Thailand (34); ~~Saudi Arabia (38)~~; Uzbekistan (54); Afghanistan (—)	Chinese Taipei (36); Indonesia (36); Macau (—); Philippines (—); Tonga (—)

Second round

Pool D	Pool E	Pool F
South Korea (7); Kazakhstan (31); 1st Pool C 2nd Pool A	China (17); India (26); 1st Pool B 2nd Pool C	Australia (21); Iran (24); 1st Pool A 2nd Pool B

Playoff round

2nd Pool D
2nd Pool E
2nd Pool F

== First round ==
=== Pool A ===
- Venue: Maktoum Bin Mohamed Stadium, Dubai, United Arab Emirates
- Dates: May 28–June 2, 2005
- All times are Gulf Standard Time (UTC+04:00)

Pos	Team	Pld	W	L	Pts	SW	SL	SR	SPW	SPL	SPR
1	Qatar	4	4	0	8	12	4	3.000	367	314	1.169
2	United Arab Emirates	4	3	1	7	11	6	1.833	381	350	1.089
3	Jordan	4	2	2	6	9	6	1.500	345	321	1.075
4	Oman	4	1	3	5	5	10	0.500	324	357	0.908
5	Maldives	4	0	4	4	1	12	0.083	248	323	0.768

Date	Time		Score		Set 1	Set 2	Set 3	Set 4	Set 5	Total	Report
28 May	17:30	Maldives	0–3	Qatar	17–25	16–25	17–25			50–75	Report
28 May	19:30	United Arab Emirates	3–1	Jordan	25–16	17–25	30–28	25–21		97–90	Report
29 May	17:30	Oman	0–3	Qatar	15–25	26–28	19–25			60–78	Report
29 May	19:30	Maldives	0–3	Jordan	18–25	14–25	20–25			52–75	Report
30 May	17:30	United Arab Emirates	3–2	Oman	23–25	25–19	25–23	20–25	15–11	108–103	Report
30 May	19:30	Jordan	2–3	Qatar	23–25	27–25	17–25	25–19	11–15	103–109	Report
01 Jun	17:30	Oman	0–3	Jordan	25–27	19–25	19–25			63–77	Report
01 Jun	19:30	United Arab Emirates	3–0	Maldives	25–15	25–19	25–18			75–52	Report
02 Jun	17:30	Maldives	1–3	Oman	25–21	27–25	22–25	22–25		96–96	Report
02 Jun	19:30	United Arab Emirates	2–3	Qatar	25–20	22–25	25–20	18–25	11–15	101–105	Report

=== Pool B ===
- Venue: Ratchaburi Gymnasium, Ratchaburi, Thailand
- Dates: May 20–22, 2005
- All times are Indochina Time (UTC+07:00)

Pos	Team	Pld	W	L	Pts	SW	SL	SR	SPW	SPL	SPR
1	Thailand	2	2	0	4	6	0	MAX	150	110	1.364
2	Uzbekistan	2	1	1	3	3	3	1.000	138	125	1.104
3	Afghanistan	2	0	2	2	0	6	0.000	97	150	0.647

Date	Time		Score		Set 1	Set 2	Set 3	Set 4	Set 5	Total	Report
20 May	17:00	Thailand	3–0	Uzbekistan	25–21	25–23	25–19			75–63	Report
21 May	17:00	Thailand	3–0	Afghanistan	25–13	25–19	25–15		75–47	150–94	Report
22 May	17:00	Uzbekistan	3–0	Afghanistan	25–19	25–13	25–18		75–50	150–100	Report

=== Pool C ===
- Venue: University of San Carlos Gymnasium, Cebu City, Philippines
- Dates: March 2–6, 2005
- All times are Philippine Standard Time (UTC+08:00)

Pos	Team	Pld	W	L	Pts	SW	SL	SR	SPW	SPL	SPR
1	Chinese Taipei	4	4	0	8	12	1	12.000	323	235	1.374
2	Indonesia	4	3	1	7	10	3	3.333	313	248	1.262
3	Philippines	4	2	2	6	6	8	0.750	298	304	0.980
4	Macau	4	1	3	5	3	9	0.333	219	293	0.747
5	Tonga	4	0	4	4	2	12	0.167	269	342	0.787

Date	Time		Score		Set 1	Set 2	Set 3	Set 4	Set 5	Total	Report
02 Mar	17:00	Philippines	3–0	Macau	25–13	25–17	25–19			75–49	Report
02 Mar	19:00	Indonesia	3–0	Tonga	25–15	25–19	25–14			75–48	Report
03 Mar	17:00	Macau	3–0	Tonga	29–27	25–20	25–21			79–68	Report
03 Mar	19:00	Chinese Taipei	3–0	Philippines	25–21	25–14	25–20			75–55	Report
04 Mar	17:00	Chinese Taipei	3–0	Tonga	25–15	25–18	25–15			75–48	Report
04 Mar	19:00	Macau	0–3	Indonesia	17–25	19–25	11–25			47–75	Report
05 Mar	14:00	Macau	0–3	Chinese Taipei	17–25	10–25	17–25			44–75	Report
05 Mar	16:00	Philippines	0–3	Indonesia	15–25	20–25	20–25			55–75	Report
06 Mar	14:00	Indonesia	1–3	Chinese Taipei	17–25	22–25	25–22	24–26		88–98	Report
06 Mar	16:00	Philippines	3–2	Tonga	25–27	25–20	23–25	25–21	15–12	113–105	Report

== Second round ==
=== Pool D ===
- Venue: Baluan Sholak Palace of Culture and Sports, Almaty, Kazakhstan
- Dates: June 17–19, 2005
- All times are Almaty Time (UTC+06:00)

Pos	Team	Pld	W	L	Pts	SW	SL	SR	SPW	SPL	SPR
1	Kazakhstan	3	3	0	6	9	1	9.000	250	199	1.256
2	South Korea	3	2	1	5	7	4	1.750	270	235	1.149
3	Chinese Taipei	3	1	2	4	4	6	0.667	213	233	0.914
4	United Arab Emirates	3	0	3	3	0	9	0.000	159	225	0.707

Date	Time		Score		Set 1	Set 2	Set 3	Set 4	Set 5	Total	Report
17 Jun	16:00	South Korea	3–1	Chinese Taipei	25–18	25–23	23–25	25–22		98–88	Report
17 Jun	18:30	Kazakhstan	3–0	United Arab Emirates	25–20	25–15	25–17			75–52	Report
18 Jun	14:00	United Arab Emirates	0–3	South Korea	13–25	16–25	18–25			47–75	Report
18 Jun	16:00	Kazakhstan	3–0	Chinese Taipei	25–20	25–11	25–19			75–50	Report
19 Jun	14:00	Chinese Taipei	3–0	United Arab Emirates	25–18	25–23	25–19			75–60	Report
19 Jun	16:00	South Korea	1–3	Kazakhstan	21–25	20–25	25–17	31–33		97–100	Report

=== Pool E ===
- Venue: Jawaharlal Nehru Indoor Stadium, Chennai, India
- Dates: June 24–26, 2005
- All times are Indian Standard Time (UTC+05:30)

Pos	Team	Pld	W	L	Pts	SW	SL	SR	SPW	SPL	SPR
1	China	3	3	0	6	9	0	MAX	225	167	1.347
2	India	3	2	1	5	6	5	1.200	253	247	1.024
3	Indonesia	3	1	2	4	5	6	0.833	229	236	0.970
4	Thailand	3	0	3	3	0	9	0.000	171	228	0.750

Date	Time		Score		Set 1	Set 2	Set 3	Set 4	Set 5	Total	Report
24 Jun	15:00	China	3–0	Thailand	25–19	25–15	25–21			75–55	Report
24 Jun	17:00	India	3–2	Indonesia	24–26	25–20	25–23	21–25	15–13	110–107	Report
25 Jun	15:00	China	3–0	Indonesia	25–16	25–14	25–17			75–47	Report
25 Jun	17:00	India	3–0	Thailand	28–26	25–21	25–18			78–65	Report
26 Jun	15:00	Indonesia	3–0	Thailand	25–18	25–21	25–12			75–51	Report
26 Jun	17:00	China	3–0	India	25–23	25–21	25–21			75–65	Report

=== Pool F ===
- Venue: Azadi Volleyball Hall, Tehran, Iran
- Dates: June 22–24, 2005
- All times are Iran Daylight Time (UTC+04:30)

Pos	Team	Pld	W	L	Pts	SW	SL	SR	SPW	SPL	SPR
1	Iran	3	3	0	6	9	0	MAX	225	170	1.324
2	Australia	3	2	1	5	6	3	2.000	210	177	1.186
3	Qatar	3	1	2	4	3	6	0.500	187	209	0.895
4	Uzbekistan	3	0	3	3	0	9	0.000	160	226	0.708

Date	Time		Score		Set 1	Set 2	Set 3	Set 4	Set 5	Total	Report
22 Jun	16:00	Uzbekistan	0–3	Qatar	24–26	15–25	19–25			58–76	Report
22 Jun	18:00	Iran	3–0	Australia	25–19	25–21	25–19			75–59	Report
23 Jun	16:00	Qatar	0–3	Australia	24–26	21–25	13–25			58–76	Report
23 Jun	18:00	Iran	3–0	Uzbekistan	25–21	25–16	25–21			75–58	Report
24 Jun	16:00	Australia	3–0	Uzbekistan	25–14	25–15	25–15			75–44	Report
24 Jun	18:00	Iran	3–0	Qatar	25–16	25–18	25–19			75–53	Report

== Playoff round ==
- Venue: Jawaharlal Nehru Indoor Stadium, Chennai, India
- Dates: July 1–3, 2005
- All times are Indian Standard Time (UTC+05:30)

Pos	Team	Pld	W	L	Pts	SW	SL	SR	SPW	SPL	SPR
1	South Korea	2	2	0	4	6	3	2.000	215	191	1.126
2	Australia	2	1	1	3	4	3	1.333	167	156	1.071
3	India	2	0	2	2	2	6	0.333	151	186	0.812

Date	Time		Score		Set 1	Set 2	Set 3	Set 4	Set 5	Total	Report
01 Jul	17:00	South Korea	3–1	Australia	25–22	27–29	25–16	27–25		104–92	Report
02 Jul	17:00	India	0–3	Australia	18–25	17–25	17–25			52–75	Report
03 Jul	17:00	India	2–3	South Korea	25–23	18–25	25–23	19–25	12–15	99–111	Report
