= 2006 FIVB Men's Volleyball World Championship qualification (CAVB) =

The CAVB qualification for the 2006 FIVB Men's Volleyball World Championship saw member nations compete for two places at the finals in Japan.

== Draw ==
13 CAVB national teams entered qualification. The teams were distributed according to their position in the FIVB Senior Men's Rankings as of 15 January 2004 using the serpentine system for their distribution. (Rankings shown in brackets) Teams ranked 1–6 did not compete in the first round, and automatically qualified for the second round.

First round

Pool A (North)	Pool B (South)
Ghana (—); Sudan (—); Uganda (—); Eritrea (—)	South Africa (70); Botswana (—); Mauritius (—)

Second round

Pool C	Pool D
Tunisia (22); Algeria (30); Morocco (36); 1st Pool B	Egypt (24); Cameroon (27); DR Congo (48); 1st Pool A

== First round ==
=== Pool A ===
- Venue: Hashim Daifalla Sports Hall, Khartoum, Sudan
- Dates: February 1–3, 2005
- All times are East Africa Time (UTC+03:00)

Pos	Team	Pld	W	L	Pts	SW	SL	SR	SPW	SPL	SPR
1	Sudan	3	3	0	6	9	3	3.000	277	234	1.184
2	Ghana	3	2	1	5	8	3	2.667	253	219	1.155
3	Uganda	3	1	2	4	4	6	0.667	232	219	1.059
4	Eritrea	3	0	3	3	0	9	0.000	135	225	0.600

Date	Time		Score		Set 1	Set 2	Set 3	Set 4	Set 5	Total	Report
01 Feb	16:15	Uganda	0–3	Ghana	20–25	23–25	20–25			63–75	Report
01 Feb	19:15	Sudan	3–0	Eritrea	25–11	25–13	25–13			75–37	Report
02 Feb	16:15	Ghana	3–0	Eritrea	25–22	25–17	25–12			75–51	Report
02 Feb	19:15	Sudan	3–1	Uganda	25–21	20–25	25–23	27–25		97–94	Report
03 Feb	16:15	Uganda	3–0	Eritrea	25–12	25–13	25–22			75–47	Report
03 Feb	19:15	Sudan	3–2	Ghana	18–25	26–24	21–25	25–19	15–10	105–103	Report

=== Pool B ===
- Venue: UKZN Sport Centre, Durban, South Africa
- Dates: April 8–10, 2005
- All times are South African Standard Time (UTC+02:00)

Pos	Team	Pld	W	L	Pts	SW	SL	SR	SPW	SPL	SPR
1	South Africa	2	2	0	4	6	0	MAX	150	110	1.364
2	Mauritius	2	1	1	3	3	4	0.750	157	163	0.963
3	Botswana	2	0	2	2	1	6	0.167	139	173	0.803

Date	Time		Score		Set 1	Set 2	Set 3	Set 4	Set 5	Total	Report
08 Apr	19:00	South Africa	3–0	Botswana	25–17	25–21	25–13			75–51	Report
09 Apr	16:00	Botswana	1–3	Mauritius	23–25	20–25	25–23	20–25		88–98	Report
10 Apr	15:00	South Africa	3–0	Mauritius	25–19	25–18	25–22			75–59	Report

== Second round ==
=== Pool C ===
- Venue: El Menzah Sports Palace, Tunis, Tunisia
- Dates: July 28–30, 2005
- All times are Central European Time (UTC+01:00)

Pos	Team	Pld	W	L	Pts	SW	SL	SR	SPW	SPL	SPR
1	Tunisia	3	3	0	6	9	0	MAX	225	143	1.573
2	South Africa	3	2	1	5	6	4	1.500	221	224	0.987
3	Algeria	3	1	2	4	4	8	0.500	242	275	0.880
4	Morocco	3	0	3	3	2	9	0.222	214	260	0.823

Date	Time		Score		Set 1	Set 2	Set 3	Set 4	Set 5	Total	Report
28 Jul	16:00	Algeria	1–3	South Africa	22–25	17–25	25–22	18–25		82–97	Report
28 Jul	18:30	Tunisia	3–0	Morocco	25–15	25–13	25–16			75–44	Report
29 Jul	16:00	Morocco	2–3	Algeria	20–25	25–20	25–23	19–25	14–16	103–109	Report
29 Jul	18:30	South Africa	0–3	Tunisia	13–25	17–25	18–25			48–75	Report
30 Jul	16:00	Morocco	0–3	South Africa	23–25	24–26	20–25			67–76	Report
30 Jul	18:30	Tunisia	3–0	Algeria	25–12	25–23	25–16			75–51	Report

=== Pool D ===
- Venue: Sport Union Club, Alexandria, Egypt
- Dates: March 24–26, 2005
- All times are Eastern European Time (UTC+02:00)

Pos	Team	Pld	W	L	Pts	SW	SL	SR	SPW	SPL	SPR
1	Egypt	3	3	0	6	9	1	9.000	245	169	1.450
2	Cameroon	3	2	1	5	7	4	1.750	258	220	1.173
3	DR Congo	3	1	2	4	4	7	0.571	213	256	0.832
4	Sudan	3	0	3	3	1	9	0.111	177	248	0.714

Date	Time		Score		Set 1	Set 2	Set 3	Set 4	Set 5	Total	Report
24 Mar	18:00	Cameroon	3–0	Sudan	25–19	25–12	25–17			75–48	Report
24 Mar	20:00	DR Congo	0–3	Egypt	12–25	11–25	15–25		38–75	76–150	Report
25 Mar	18:00	Sudan	1–3	DR Congo	25–22	24–26	18–25		89–98	156–171	Report
25 Mar	20:00	Egypt	3–1	Cameroon	20–25	25–23	25–22	25–21		95–91	Report
26 Mar	18:00	Cameroon	3–1	DR Congo	17–25	25–15	25–20		92–77	159–137	Report
26 Mar	20:00	Egypt	3–0	Sudan	25–16	25–15	25–9			75–40	Report
