= 2006 FIVB Men's Volleyball World Championship =

2006 FIVB World Championship

Tournament details
- Host country: Japan
- Dates: 17 November – 3 December
- Teams: 24 (from 5 confederations)
- Venue: 7 (in 6 host cities)
- Officially opened by: Akihito

Final positions
- Champions: Brazil (2nd title)
- Runners-up: Poland
- Third place: Bulgaria
- Fourth place: Serbia and Montenegro

Tournament awards
- MVP: (Brazil) Gilberto Godoy Filho

Tournament statistics
- Matches played: 104
- Attendance: 298,352 (2,869 per match)

The 2006 FIVB Men's Volleyball World Championship was held in Japan from 17 November to 3 December 2006. Like the previous edition, 24 teams participated in the tournament. Brazil won the Tournament (retaining their championship title), defeating Poland 3:0 in the final match. Bulgaria placed 3rd, defeating Serbia and Montenegro 3:1 in the 3rd place match. The Polish team dedicated this achievement to the deceased Polish volleyball player Arkadiusz Gołaś. The team honored him at the award ceremony, when they wore T-shirts with the number 16 and the words "Golas".

== Host ==
Finals hosts Japan. The tournament was held in six Japan cities.

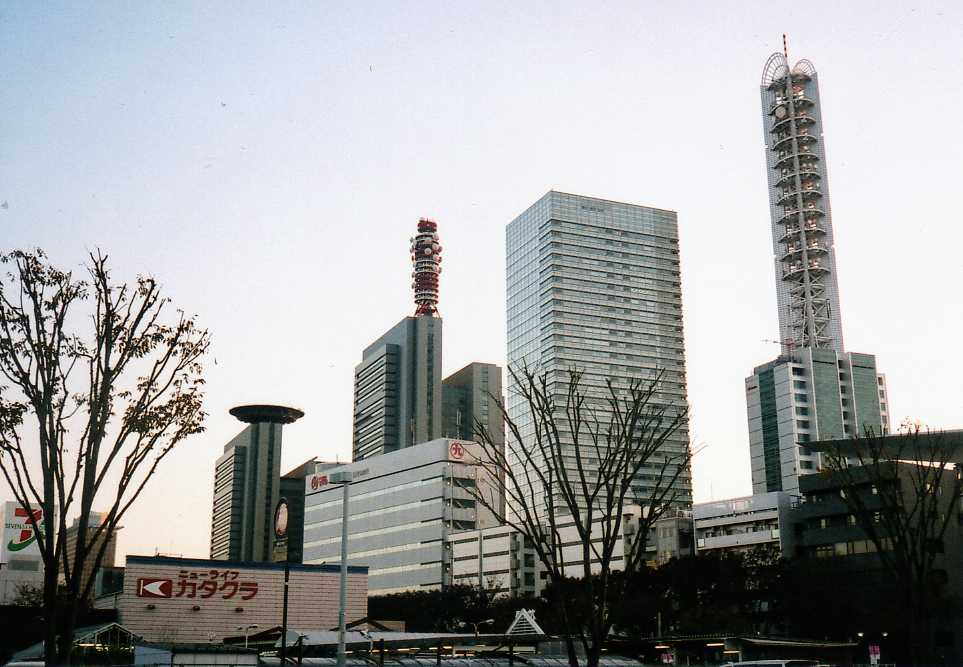
Saitama

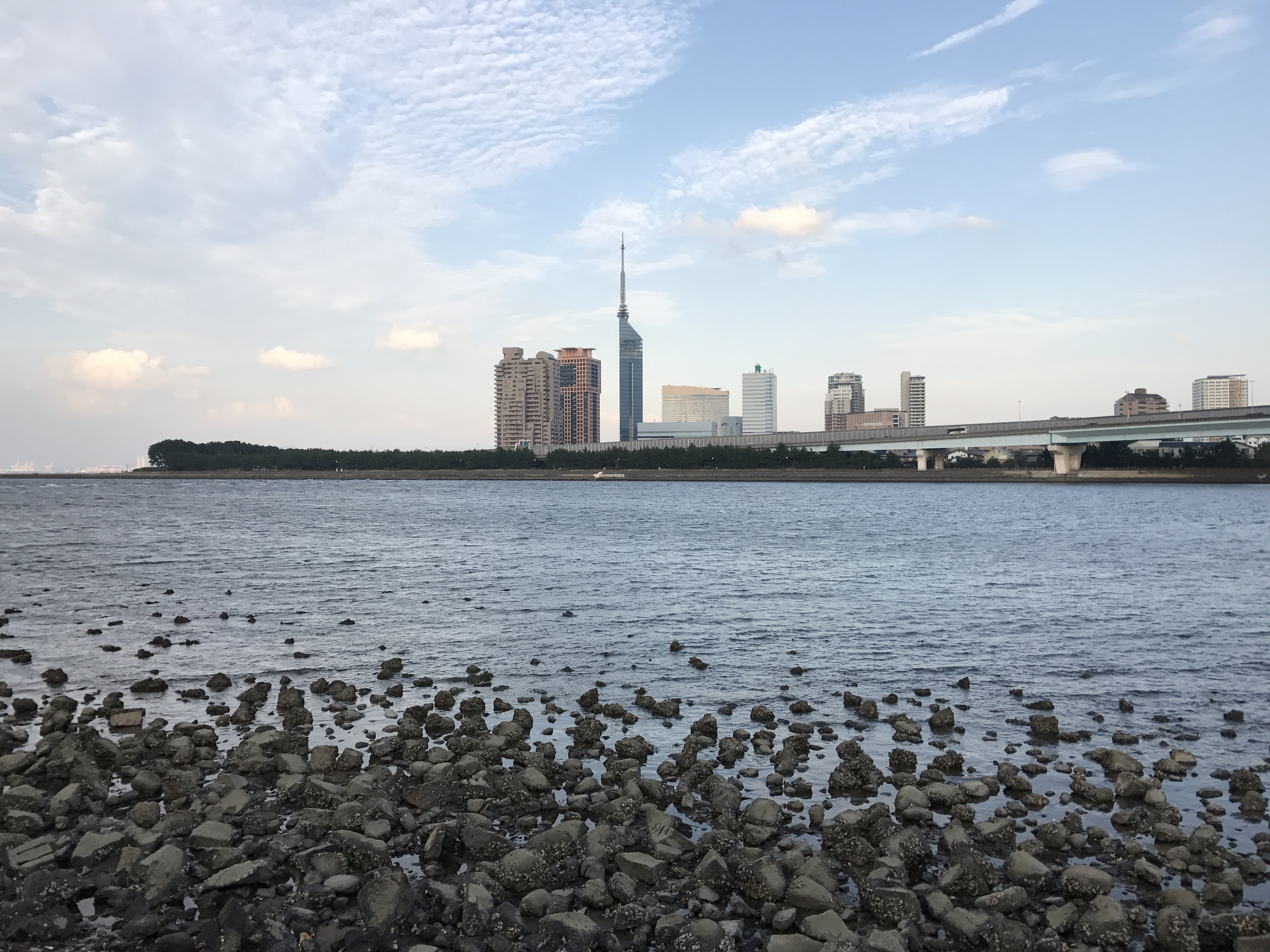
Fukuoka

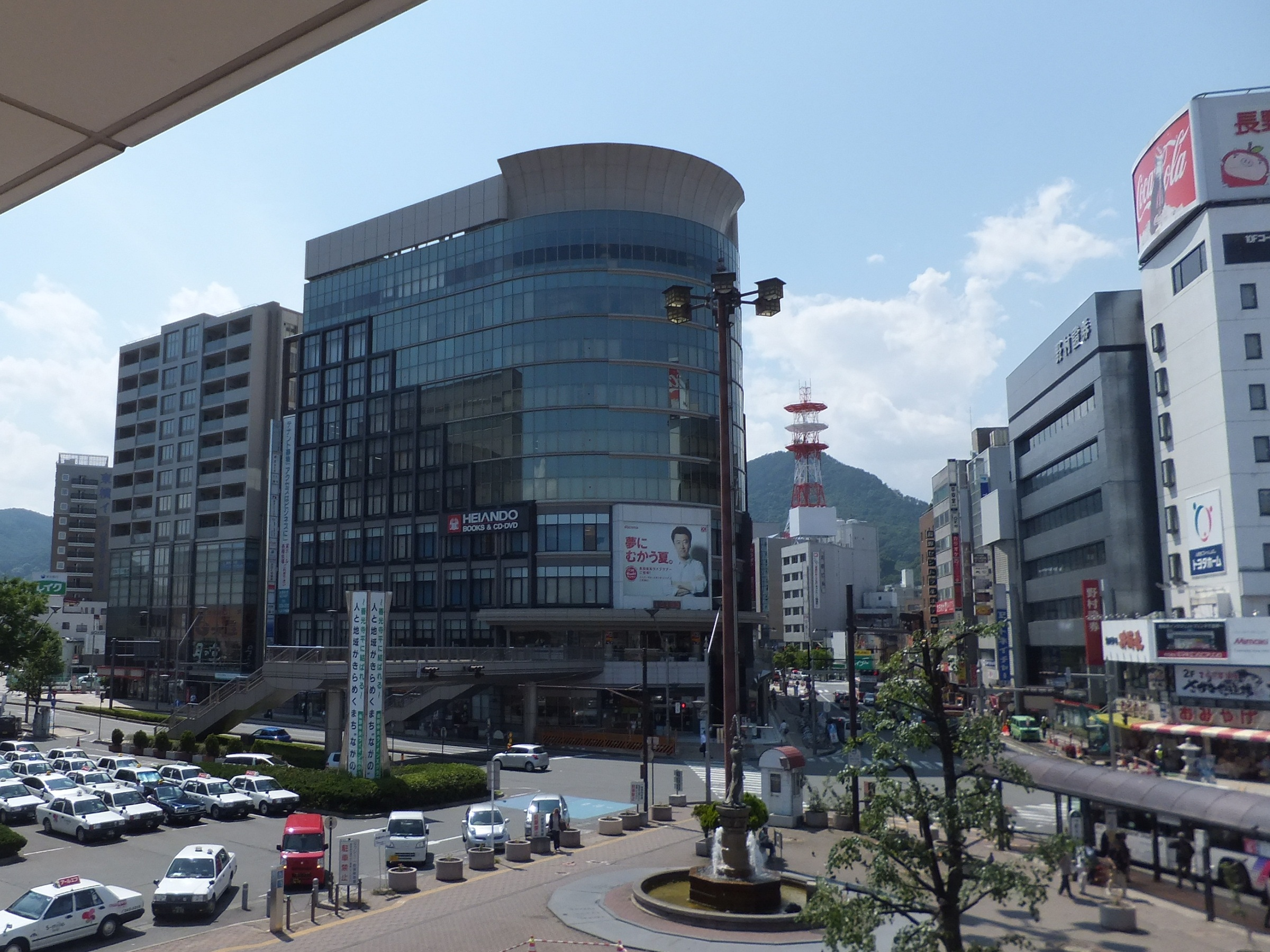
Nagano

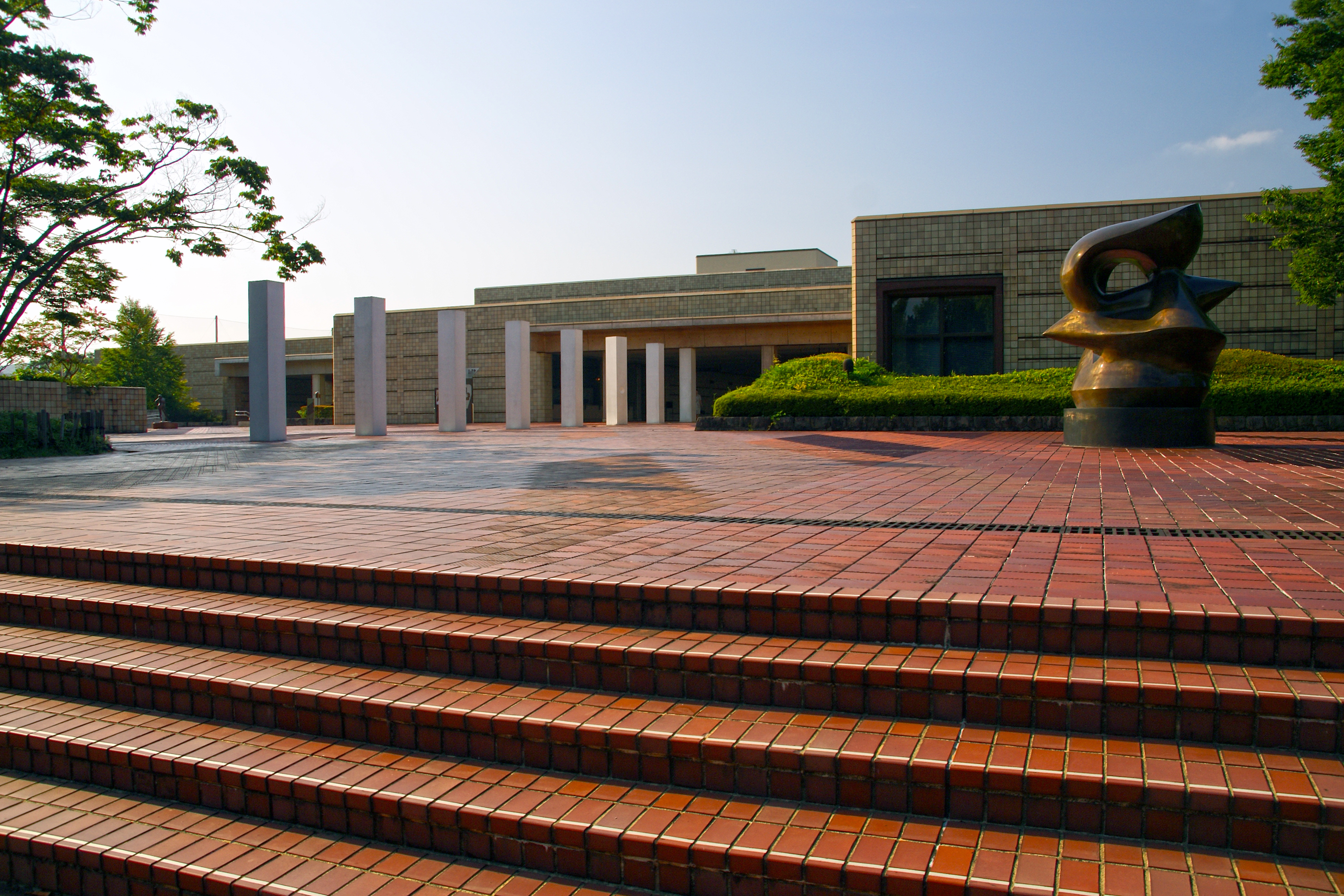
Sendai

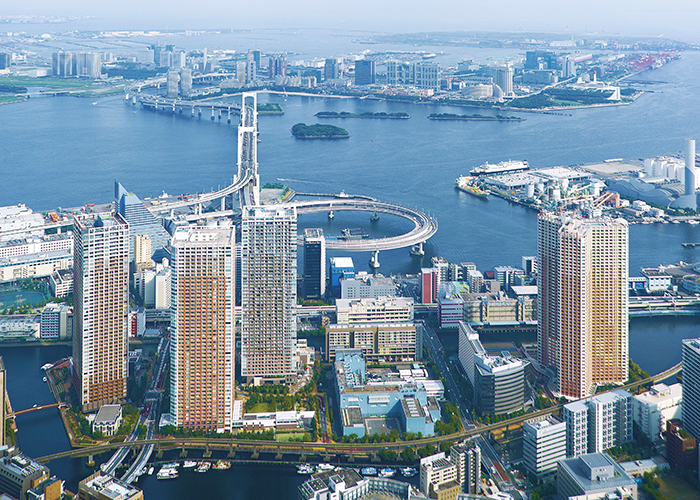
Tokyo

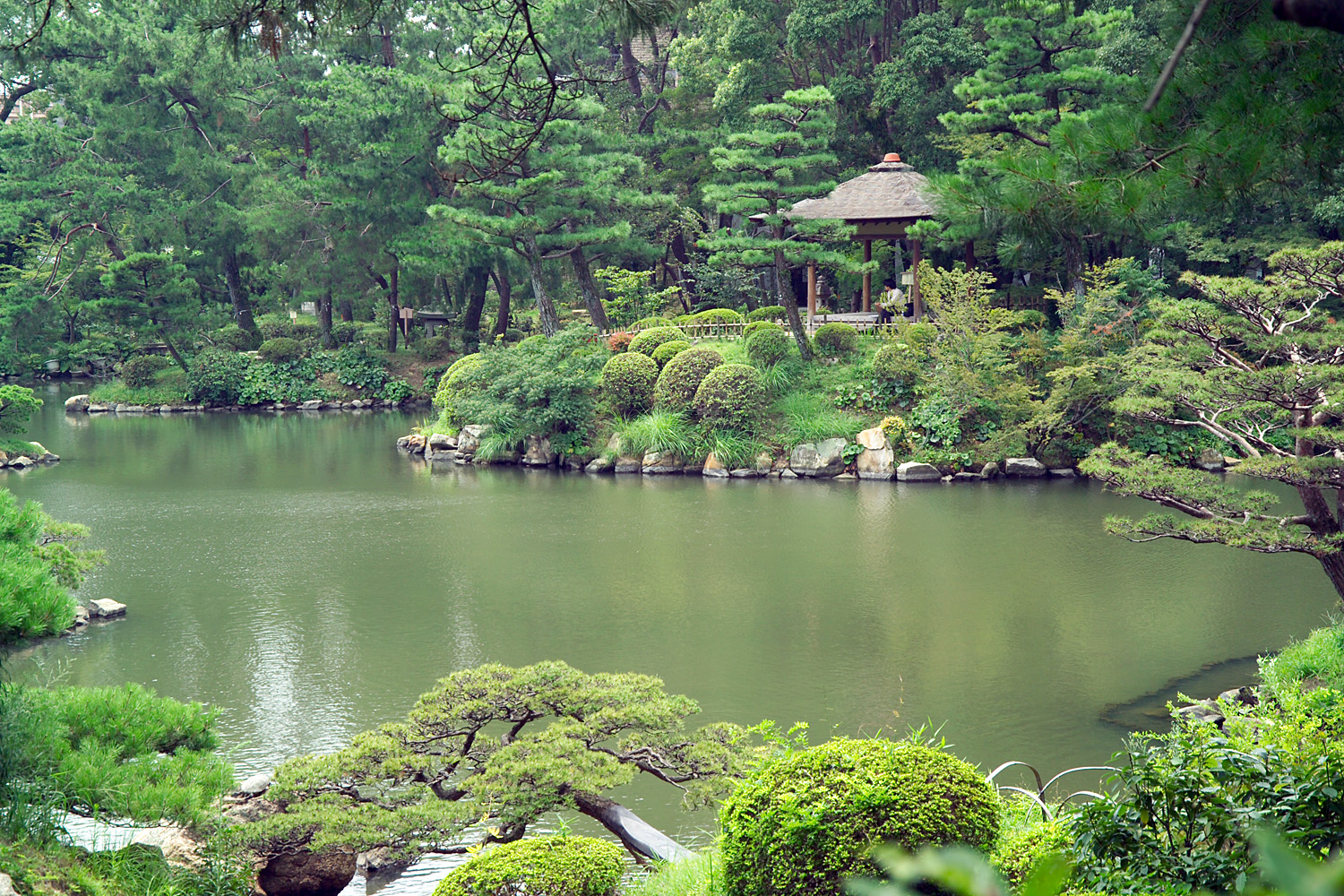
Hiroshima

== Qualification ==
Africa (CAVB)	Asia and Oceania (AVC)	Europe (CEV)	North America (NORCECA)	South America (CSV)
Pool C Winners: Tunisia; Pool D Winners: Egypt	Host Country: Japan; Pool D Winners: Kazakhstan; Pool E Winners: China; Pool F Winners: Iran; Playoff Winners: South Korea; Playoff Runners-up: Australia	Pool I Winners: Germany; Pool I Runners-up: Italy; Pool J Winners: Greece; Pool J Runners-up: Serbia and Montenegro; Pool K Winners: France; Pool K Runners-up: Czech Republic; Pool L Winners: Russia; Pool L Runners-up: Poland; Playoff Winners: Bulgaria	Pool D Winners: United States; Pool D Runners-up: Puerto Rico; Pool E Winners: Cuba; Pool E Runners-up: Canada	Defending Champions: Brazil; Pool A Winners: Argentina; Pool B Winners: Venezuela

== Pools composition ==
=== First round ===
Teams were seeded in the first three positions of each pool following the serpentine system according to their FIVB World Ranking as of 7 September 2005. FIVB reserved the right to seed the hosts as head of pool A regardless of the World Ranking. All teams not seeded were drawn to take other available positions in the remaining lines, following the World Ranking. The draw was held in Tokyo, Japan on 29 November 2005. Rankings are shown in brackets except the hosts who ranked 16th.

Pool A	Pool B	Pool C	Pool D
Japan (Hosts)	Brazil (1)	Italy (2)	Serbia and Montenegro (3)
Argentina (7)	France (6)	United States (5)	Russia (4)
Poland (8)	Greece (9)	Venezuela (10)	South Korea (11)
China (18)	Cuba (12)	Bulgaria (16)	Canada (13)
Egypt (21)	Australia (20)	Iran (22)	Tunisia (19)
Puerto Rico (27)	Germany (24)	Czech Republic (23)	Kazakhstan (26)

=== Second round ===
Pool E		Pool F	
1A	Poland	1B	Brazil
1D	Serbia and Montenegro	1C	Bulgaria
2A	Japan	2B	France
2D	Russia	2C	Italy
3A	Argentina	3B	Germany
3D	Canada	3C	Czech Republic
4A	Puerto Rico	4B	Cuba
4D	Tunisia	4C	United States

== Venues ==
Pool A	Pool B	Pool C	Pool D and E
Saitama, Japan	Fukuoka, Japan	Nagano, Japan	Sendai, Japan
Saitama Super Arena	Marine Messe Fukuoka	White Ring	Sendai Gymnasium
Capacity: 20,000	Capacity: 8,500	Capacity: 7,000	Capacity: 5,705
Pool F	Final round		2006 FIVB Men's Volleyball World Championship (Japan)
Hiroshima, Japan	Tokyo, Japan		2006 FIVB Men's Volleyball World Championship (Japan)
Hiroshima Green Arena	Yoyogi National Gymnasium	Tokyo Metropolitan Gymnasium	2006 FIVB Men's Volleyball World Championship (Japan)
Capacity: 4,750	Capacity: 13,291	Capacity: 10,000	2006 FIVB Men's Volleyball World Championship (Japan)

== First round ==
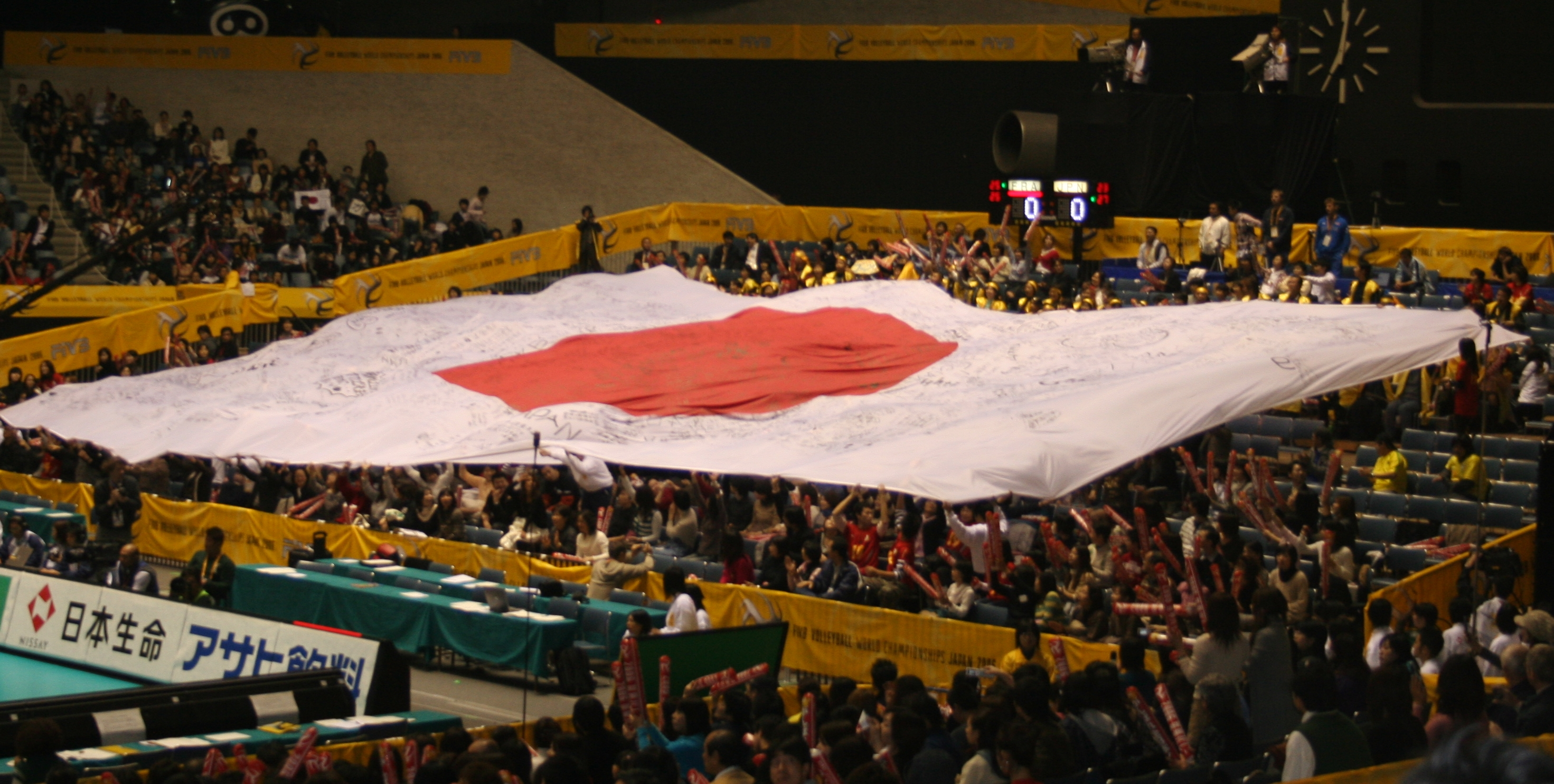
Japan fans flag.

- All times are Japan Standard Time (UTC+09:00).
- The top four teams in each pool qualified for the second round.

=== Pool A ===
Pos	Team	Pld	W	L	Pts	SW	SL	SR	SPW	SPL	SPR	Qualification
1	Poland	5	5	0	10	15	0	MAX	376	312	1.205	Second round
2	Japan	5	3	2	8	11	10	1.100	488	476	1.025	Second round
3	Argentina	5	2	3	7	9	12	0.750	487	485	1.004	Second round
4	Puerto Rico	5	2	3	7	9	12	0.750	490	493	0.994	Second round
5	China	5	2	3	7	9	13	0.692	473	499	0.948	
6	Egypt	5	1	4	6	8	14	0.571	470	519	0.906	

Source: FIVB

Date	Time		Score		Set 1	Set 2	Set 3	Set 4	Set 5	Total	Report
17 Nov	13:00	Poland	3–0	China	25–21	25–20	25–21			75–62	P2 P3
17 Nov	15:00	Puerto Rico	3–2	Argentina	19–25	34–32	28–26	21–25	15–13	117–121	P2 P3
17 Nov	18:00	Egypt	2–3	Japan	13–25	21–25	26–24	26–24	12–15	98–113	P2 P3
18 Nov	13:00	Argentina	0–3	Poland	21–25	22–25	22–25			65–75	P2 P3
18 Nov	15:00	Egypt	3–2	Puerto Rico	27–29	19–25	25–21	25–20	15–12	111–107	P2 P3
18 Nov	18:00	Japan	2–3	China	25–22	22–25	20–25	25–23	13–15	105–110	P2 P3
19 Nov	13:00	China	2–3	Argentina	25–22	21–25	25–17	17–25	15–17	103–106	P2 P3
19 Nov	15:20	Poland	3–0	Egypt	25–13	25–19	26–24			76–56	P2 P3
19 Nov	18:00	Puerto Rico	1–3	Japan	23–25	20–25	25–21	34–36		102–107	P2 P3
21 Nov	13:00	Egypt	2–3	China	25–22	25–22	30–32	20–25	16–18	116–119	P2 P3
21 Nov	15:30	Puerto Rico	0–3	Poland	22–25	22–25	23–25			67–75	P2 P3
21 Nov	18:00	Japan	3–1	Argentina	25–16	22–25	27–25	27–25		101–91	P2 P3
22 Nov	13:00	China	1–3	Puerto Rico	17–25	13–25	25–21	24–26		79–97	P2 P3
22 Nov	15:05	Argentina	3–1	Egypt	25–18	29–31	25–20	25–20		104–89	P2 P3
22 Nov	18:00	Poland	3–0	Japan	25–18	25–21	25–23			75–62	P2 P3

=== Pool B ===
Pos	Team	Pld	W	L	Pts	SW	SL	SR	SPW	SPL	SPR	Qualification
1	Brazil	5	4	1	9	13	4	3.250	418	350	1.194	Second round
2	France	5	4	1	9	13	7	1.857	491	466	1.054	Second round
3	Germany	5	4	1	9	12	5	2.400	409	391	1.046	Second round
4	Cuba	5	2	3	7	8	11	0.727	401	424	0.946	Second round
5	Greece	5	1	4	6	6	13	0.462	408	446	0.915	
6	Australia	5	0	5	5	3	15	0.200	402	452	0.889	

Source: FIVB

Date	Time		Score		Set 1	Set 2	Set 3	Set 4	Set 5	Total	Report
17 Nov	14:00	Cuba	1–3	Brazil	25–21	19–25	15–25	22–25		81–96	P2 P3
17 Nov	16:15	Greece	1–3	France	22–25	22–25	25–22	17–25		86–97	P2 P3
17 Nov	18:40	Germany	3–1	Australia	20–25	25–22	25–21	30–28		100–96	P2 P3
18 Nov	14:00	Brazil	3–0	Greece	25–19	25–18	25–16			75–53	P2 P3
18 Nov	16:00	Australia	1–3	France	23–25	28–30	26–24	24–26		101–105	P2 P3
18 Nov	18:40	Germany	3–0	Cuba	25–14	25–23	25–20			75–57	P2 P3
19 Nov	14:00	Cuba	3–0	Australia	25–15	25–19	25–20			75–54	P2 P3
19 Nov	16:00	Greece	0–3	Germany	22–25	26–28	21–25			69–78	P2 P3
19 Nov	18:05	France	3–1	Brazil	20–25	25–22	25–23	29–27		99–97	P2 P3
21 Nov	14:00	Cuba	3–2	Greece	25–19	20–25	25–22	21–25	15–12	106–103	P2 P3
21 Nov	16:35	Australia	0–3	Brazil	19–25	19–25	23–25			61–75	P2 P3
21 Nov	18:25	Germany	3–1	France	22–25	25–21	28–26	25–22		100–94	P2 P3
22 Nov	14:00	Brazil	3–0	Germany	25–13	25–21	25–22			75–56	P2 P3
22 Nov	16:00	France	3–1	Cuba	25–21	25–19	21–25	25–17		96–82	P2 P3
22 Nov	18:20	Greece	3–1	Australia	25–20	25–22	22–25	25–23		97–90	P2 P3

=== Pool C ===
Pos	Team	Pld	W	L	Pts	SW	SL	SR	SPW	SPL	SPR	Qualification
1	Bulgaria	5	5	0	10	15	4	3.750	449	398	1.128	Second round
2	Italy	5	4	1	9	14	6	2.333	463	402	1.152	Second round
3	Czech Republic	5	2	3	7	8	9	0.889	386	377	1.024	Second round
4	United States	5	2	3	7	8	10	0.800	400	420	0.952	Second round
5	Venezuela	5	2	3	7	8	11	0.727	401	433	0.926	
6	Iran	5	0	5	5	2	15	0.133	350	419	0.835	

Source: FIVB

Date	Time		Score		Set 1	Set 2	Set 3	Set 4	Set 5	Total	Report
17 Nov	14:00	United States	1–3	Venezuela	18–25	25–20	21–25	18–25		82–95	P2 P3
17 Nov	16:28	Czech Republic	3–0	Iran	25–23	25–19	25–22			75–64	P2 P3
17 Nov	18:25	Italy	2–3	Bulgaria	25–20	24–26	16–25	25–16	8–15	98–102	P2 P3
18 Nov	14:01	Iran	1–3	Venezuela	20–25	25–23	17–25	20–25		82–98	P2 P3
18 Nov	16:25	Czech Republic	0–3	Italy	22–25	19–25	23–25			64–75	P2 P3
18 Nov	18:21	Bulgaria	3–0	United States	30–28	25–22	25–21			80–71	P2 P3
19 Nov	14:01	United States	3–1	Czech Republic	25–16	15–25	25–20	25–23		90–84	P2 P3
19 Nov	16:20	Venezuela	1–3	Bulgaria	25–22	17–25	22–25	17–25		81–97	P2 P3
19 Nov	18:46	Italy	3–1	Iran	25–15	21–25	25–21	25–19		96–80	P2 P3
21 Nov	14:00	Iran	0–3	Bulgaria	19–25	18–25	23–25			60–75	P2 P3
21 Nov	16:00	Czech Republic	3–0	Venezuela	25–20	25–14	25–19			75–53	P2 P3
21 Nov	18:00	Italy	3–1	United States	22–25	25–17	25–22	25–18		97–82	P2 P3
22 Nov	14:00	Bulgaria	3–1	Czech Republic	20–25	25–22	25–20	25–21		95–88	P2 P3
22 Nov	16:25	United States	3–0	Iran	25–19	25–22	25–23			75–64	P2 P3
22 Nov	18:26	Venezuela	1–3	Italy	13–25	25–22	21–25	15–25		74–97	P2 P3

=== Pool D ===
Pos	Team	Pld	W	L	Pts	SW	SL	SR	SPW	SPL	SPR	Qualification
1	Serbia and Montenegro	5	5	0	10	15	2	7.500	420	339	1.239	Second round
2	Russia	5	4	1	9	12	3	4.000	367	296	1.240	Second round
3	Canada	5	3	2	8	9	9	1.000	403	409	0.985	Second round
4	Tunisia	5	2	3	7	8	11	0.727	406	445	0.912	Second round
5	South Korea	5	1	4	6	7	13	0.538	433	469	0.923	
6	Kazakhstan	5	0	5	5	2	15	0.133	351	422	0.832	

Source: FIVB

Date	Time		Score		Set 1	Set 2	Set 3	Set 4	Set 5	Total	Report
17 Nov	14:00	Canada	3–0	Kazakhstan	25–21	26–24	25–21			76–66	P2 P3
17 Nov	16:00	Russia	0–3	Serbia and Montenegro	22–25	18–25	23–25			63–75	P2 P3
17 Nov	18:00	Tunisia	3–2	South Korea	25–22	24–26	17–25	28–26	15–13	109–112	P2 P3
18 Nov	14:00	Russia	3–0	Tunisia	25–15	29–27	25–20			79–62	P2 P3
18 Nov	16:00	Serbia and Montenegro	3–1	Kazakhstan	25–16	22–25	25–18	25–22		97–81	P2 P3
18 Nov	18:10	South Korea	1–3	Canada	28–26	23–25	16–25	23–25		90–101	P2 P3
19 Nov	14:00	Kazakhstan	1–3	South Korea	22–25	25–23	18–25	21–25		86–98	P2 P3
19 Nov	16:15	Tunisia	0–3	Serbia and Montenegro	21–25	12–25	23–25			56–75	P2 P3
19 Nov	18:00	Canada	0–3	Russia	19–25	20–25	21–25			60–75	P2 P3
21 Nov	14:00	Tunisia	2–3	Canada	15–25	29–27	25–21	21–25	13–15	103–113	P2 P3
21 Nov	16:35	Serbia and Montenegro	3–1	South Korea	25–22	23–25	25–21	25–18		98–86	P2 P3
21 Nov	18:50	Russia	3–0	Kazakhstan	25–16	25–18	25–18			75–52	P2 P3
22 Nov	14:00	Kazakhstan	0–3	Tunisia	19–25	23–25	24–26			66–76	P2 P3
22 Nov	16:00	Canada	0–3	Serbia and Montenegro	18–25	18–25	17–25			53–75	P2 P3
22 Nov	18:00	South Korea	0–3	Russia	13–25	21–25	13–25			47–75	P2 P3

== Second round ==
- All times are Japan Standard Time (UTC+09:00).
- The results and the points of the matches between the same teams that were already played during the first round were taken into account for the second round.
- The top two teams in each pool qualified for the semifinals. The third and fourth ranked teams in each pool qualified for the 5th–8th semifinals, whereas the fifth and sixth ranked teams in each pool qualified for the 9th–12th semifinals.

=== Pool E ===
Pos	Team	Pld	W	L	Pts	SW	SL	SR	SPW	SPL	SPR	Qualification
1	Poland	7	7	0	14	21	2	10.500	556	479	1.161	Semifinals
2	Serbia and Montenegro	7	6	1	13	18	5	3.600	561	479	1.171	Semifinals
3	Russia	7	5	2	12	17	6	2.833	545	461	1.182	5th–8th semifinals
4	Japan	7	4	3	11	12	14	0.857	600	607	0.988	5th–8th semifinals
5	Puerto Rico	7	2	5	9	10	17	0.588	625	654	0.956	9th–12th semifinals
6	Canada	7	2	5	9	7	19	0.368	527	605	0.871	9th–12th semifinals
7	Argentina	7	1	6	8	9	20	0.450	621	674	0.921	
8	Tunisia	7	1	6	8	9	20	0.450	612	688	0.890	

Source: FIVB

Date	Time		Score		Set 1	Set 2	Set 3	Set 4	Set 5	Total	Report
25 Nov	11:00	Argentina	0–3	Russia	18–25	20–25	14–25			52–75	P2 P3
25 Nov	13:00	Puerto Rico	1–3	Serbia and Montenegro	18–25	23–25	25–20	23–25		89–95	P2 P3
25 Nov	15:05	Poland	3–0	Tunisia	25–22	25–18	25–23			75–63	P2 P3
25 Nov	18:00	Japan	3–1	Canada	23–25	25–21	25–17	25–22		98–85	P2 P3
26 Nov	11:00	Argentina	1–3	Serbia and Montenegro	18–25	16–25	26–24	17–25		77–99	P2 P3
26 Nov	13:05	Poland	3–0	Canada	25–21	25–17	25–17			75–55	P2 P3
26 Nov	15:00	Puerto Rico	0–3	Russia	20–25	16–25	15–25			51–75	P2 P3
26 Nov	18:00	Japan	3–2	Tunisia	23–25	23–25	25–22	25–23	15–6	111–101	P2 P3
28 Nov	11:00	Puerto Rico	3–0	Canada	25–22	25–21	25–16			75–59	P2 P3
28 Nov	13:00	Argentina	3–2	Tunisia	25–20	25–27	21–25	25–21	15–12	111–105	P2 P3
28 Nov	15:25	Poland	3–2	Russia	19–25	19–25	25–22	25–20	15–11	103–103	P2 P3
28 Nov	18:07	Japan	0–3	Serbia and Montenegro	26–28	16–25	21–25			63–78	P2 P3
29 Nov	11:00	Argentina	2–3	Canada	25–19	25–18	21–25	20–25	13–15	104–102	P2 P3
29 Nov	13:25	Puerto Rico	2–3	Tunisia	40–38	26–28	25–16	22–25	11–15	124–122	P2 P3
29 Nov	16:05	Poland	3–0	Serbia and Montenegro	28–26	25–19	25–19			78–64	P2 P3
29 Nov	18:05	Japan	0–3	Russia	20–25	18–25	20–25			58–75	P2 P3

=== Pool F ===
Pos	Team	Pld	W	L	Pts	SW	SL	SR	SPW	SPL	SPR	Qualification
1	Brazil	7	6	1	13	19	5	3.800	589	510	1.155	Semifinals
2	Bulgaria	7	6	1	13	19	9	2.111	645	601	1.073	Semifinals
3	France	7	5	2	12	18	12	1.500	679	640	1.061	5th–8th semifinals
4	Italy	7	4	3	11	16	11	1.455	606	564	1.074	5th–8th semifinals
5	United States	7	3	4	10	12	15	0.800	579	619	0.935	9th–12th semifinals
6	Germany	7	2	5	9	10	16	0.625	577	609	0.947	9th–12th semifinals
7	Czech Republic	7	1	6	8	6	19	0.316	565	602	0.939	
8	Cuba	7	1	6	8	6	19	0.316	523	618	0.846	

Source: FIVB

Date	Time		Score		Set 1	Set 2	Set 3	Set 4	Set 5	Total	Report
25 Nov	11:00	Cuba	0–3	Bulgaria	22–25	18–25	20–25			60–75	P2 P3
25 Nov	13:00	Brazil	3–0	United States	25–19	25–18	25–23			75–60	P2 P3
25 Nov	15:00	France	3–0	Czech Republic	25–19	25–23	25–18			75–60	P2 P3
25 Nov	18:00	Germany	0–3	Italy	23–25	22–25	16–25			61–75	P2 P3
26 Nov	11:00	France	3–2	United States	17–25	25–12	24–26	25–17	15–11	106–91	P2 P3
26 Nov	13:30	Brazil	3–0	Czech Republic	25–22	25–20	26–24			76–66	P2 P3
26 Nov	15:25	Germany	1–3	Bulgaria	22–25	25–23	20–25	18–25		85–98	P2 P3
26 Nov	18:00	Cuba	1–3	Italy	20–25	15–25	25–23	15–25		75–98	P2 P3
28 Nov	11:00	France	2–3	Bulgaria	25–23	25–22	22–25	22–25	10–15	104–110	P2 P3
28 Nov	13:35	Germany	2–3	United States	28–30	25–15	26–24	24–26	13–15	116–110	P2 P3
28 Nov	16:30	Brazil	3–0	Italy	25–23	25–20	25–20			75–63	P2 P3
28 Nov	18:20	Cuba	3–1	Czech Republic	31–29	26–24	24–26	26–24		107–103	P2 P3
29 Nov	11:00	Cuba	0–3	United States	22–25	17–25	22–25			61–75	P2 P3
29 Nov	13:00	Brazil	3–1	Bulgaria	25–22	20–25	25–22	25–16		95–85	P2 P3
29 Nov	15:15	Germany	1–3	Czech Republic	23–25	27–25	21–25	13–25		84–100	P2 P3
29 Nov	18:00	France	3–2	Italy	25–23	25–17	17–25	23–25	15–10	105–100	P2 P3

== Final round ==
- All times are Japan Standard Time (UTC+09:00).

=== 9th–12th places ===
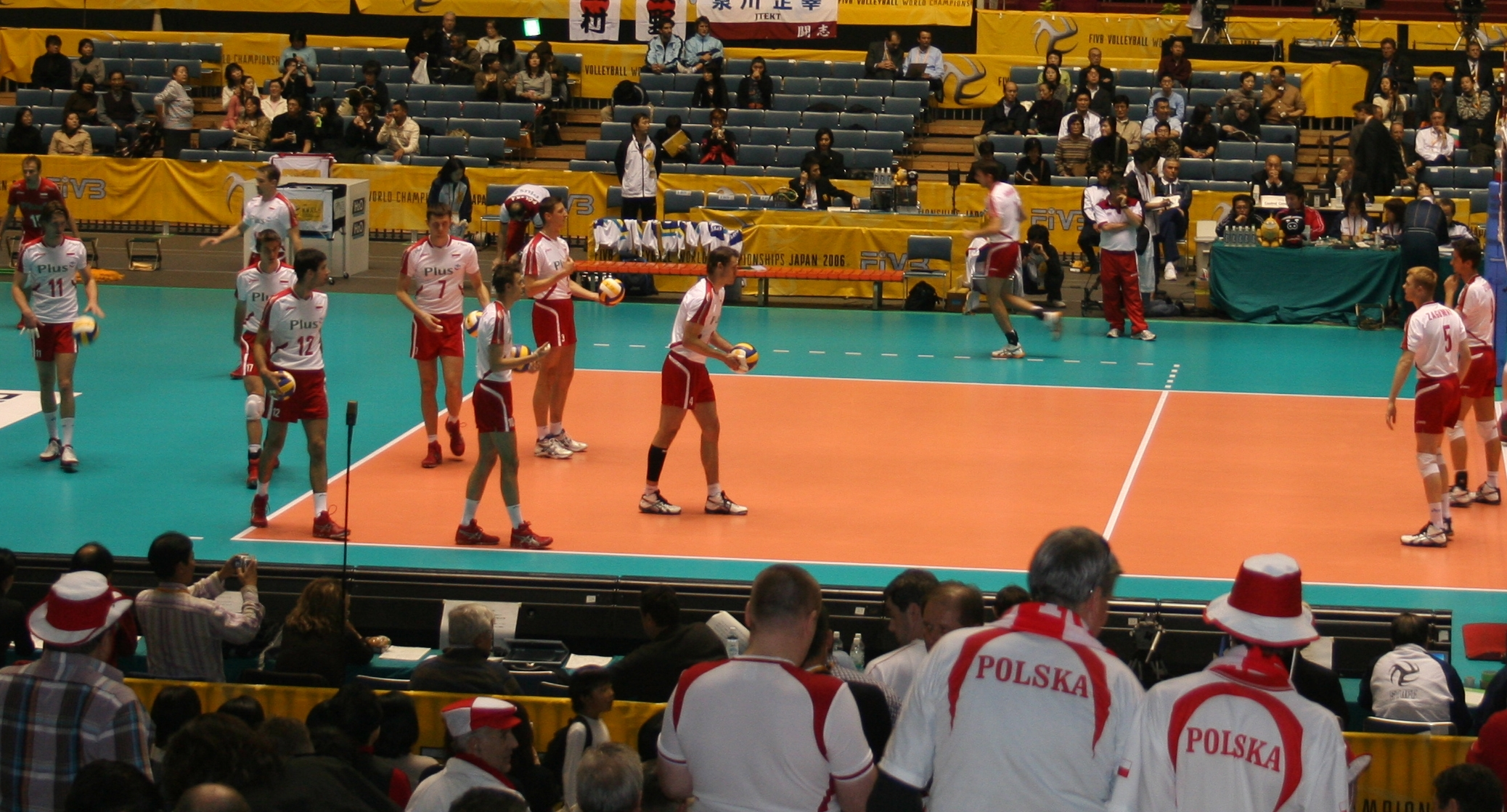
Polish players at their semifinal.

9th–12th semifinals
2 December
Puerto Rico	1
Germany	3
2 December
United States	3
Canada	2

9th place match
3 December
Germany	3
United States	2
11th place match
3 December
Puerto Rico	1
Canada	3

==== 9th–12th semifinals ====
Date	Time	Venue		Score		Set 1	Set 2	Set 3	Set 4	Set 5	Total	Report
2 Dec	14:00	TMG	United States	3–2	Canada	25–21	24–26	12–25	25–21	15–9	101–102	P2 P3
2 Dec	16:30	TMG	Puerto Rico	1–3	Germany	19–25	25–23	19–25	18–25		81–98	P2 P3

==== 11th place match ====
Date	Time	Venue		Score		Set 1	Set 2	Set 3	Set 4	Set 5	Total	Report
3 Dec	12:00	YNG	Puerto Rico	1–3	Canada	17–25	25–18	22–25	21–25		85–93	P2 P3

==== 9th place match ====
Date	Time	Venue		Score		Set 1	Set 2	Set 3	Set 4	Set 5	Total	Report
3 Dec	13:00	TMG	Germany	3–2	United States	25–17	25–18	25–27	20–25	17–15	112–102	P2 P3

=== 5th–8th places ===
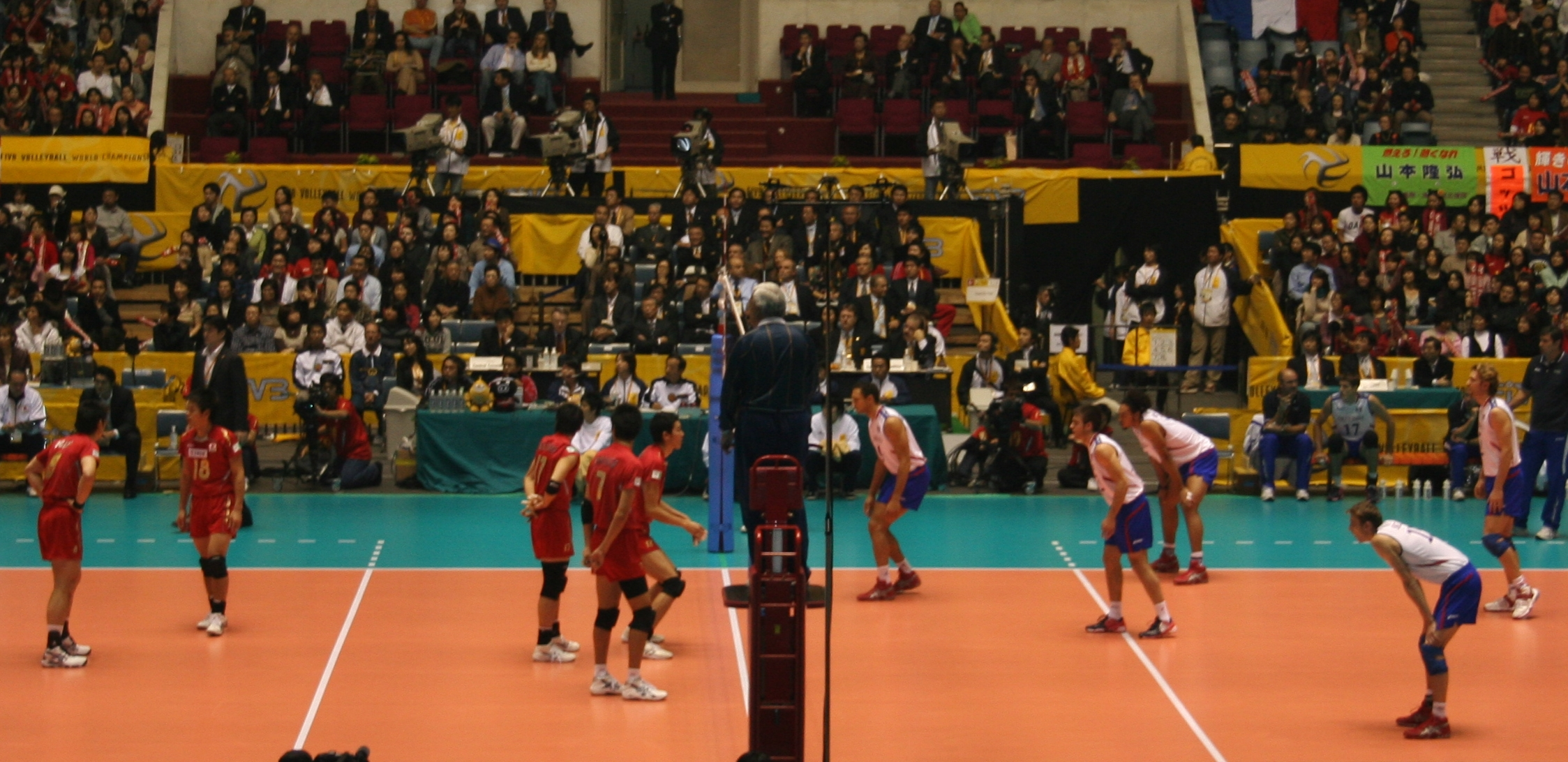
Japan vs. France.

5th–8th semifinals
2 December
Russia	0
Italy	3
2 December
France	3
Japan	1

5th place match
3 December
Italy	3
France	0
7th place match
3 December
Russia	3
Japan	1

==== 5th–8th semifinals ====
Date	Time	Venue		Score		Set 1	Set 2	Set 3	Set 4	Set 5	Total	Report
2 Dec	18:00	YNG	France	3–1	Japan	25–23	25–27	25–18	25–12		100–80	P2 P3
2 Dec	18:50	TMG	Russia	0–3	Italy	23–25	22–25	20–25			65–75	P2 P3

==== 7th place match ====
Date	Time	Venue		Score		Set 1	Set 2	Set 3	Set 4	Set 5	Total	Report
3 Dec	18:00	YNG	Russia	3–1	Japan	25–18	22–25	25–18	25–17		97–78	P2 P3

==== 5th place match ====
Date	Time	Venue		Score		Set 1	Set 2	Set 3	Set 4	Set 5	Total	Report
3 Dec	15:40	TMG	Italy	3–0	France	25–19	25–17	30–28			80–64	P2 P3

=== Final four ===
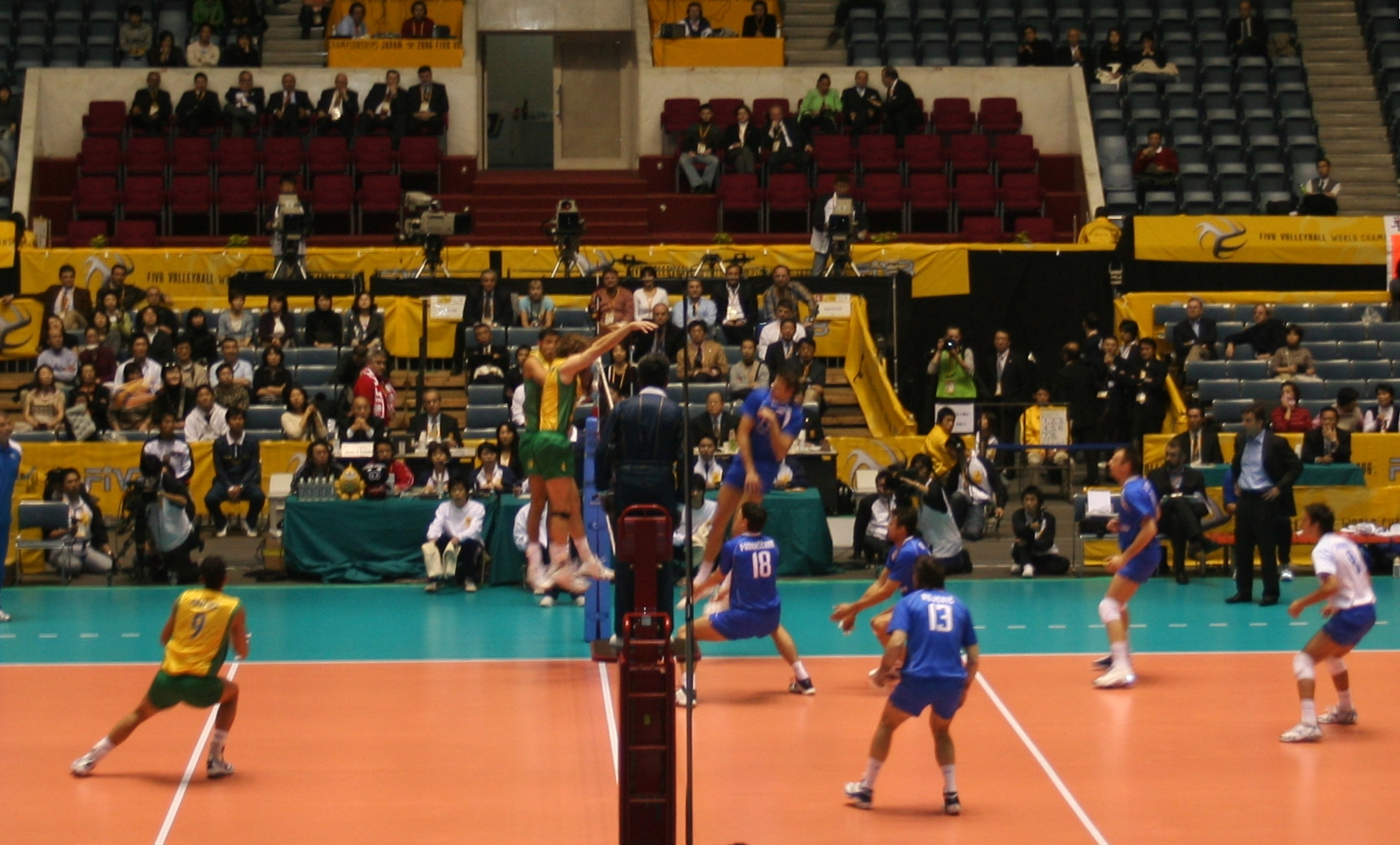
Brazil vs. Serbia & Montenegro.

Semifinals
2 December
Poland	3
Bulgaria	1
2 December
Brazil	3
Serbia and Montenegro	1

Final
3 December
Poland	0
Brazil	3
3rd place match
3 December
Bulgaria	3
Serbia and Montenegro	1

==== Semifinals ====
Date	Time	Venue		Score		Set 1	Set 2	Set 3	Set 4	Set 5	Total	Report
2 Dec	12:30	YNG	Brazil	3–1	Serbia and Montenegro	25–19	15–25	25–22	25–12		90–78	P2 P3
2 Dec	15:00	YNG	Poland	3–1	Bulgaria	25–20	26–28	25–23	25–23		101–94	P2 P3

==== 3rd place match ====
Date	Time	Venue		Score		Set 1	Set 2	Set 3	Set 4	Set 5	Total	Report
3 Dec	14:30	YNG	Bulgaria	3–1	Serbia and Montenegro	22–25	25–23	25–23	25–23		97–94	P2 P3

==== Final ====
Date	Time	Venue		Score		Set 1	Set 2	Set 3	Set 4	Set 5	Total	Report
3 Dec	20:20	YNG	Poland	0–3	Brazil	12–25	22–25	17–25			51–75	P2 P3

== Final standing ==
Rank	Team
1st place, gold medalist(s)	Brazil
2nd place, silver medalist(s)	Poland
3rd place, bronze medalist(s)	Bulgaria
4	Serbia and Montenegro
5	Italy
6	France
7	Russia
8	Japan
9	Germany
10	United States
11	Canada
12	Puerto Rico
13	Argentina
13	Czech Republic
15	Cuba
15	Tunisia
17	China
17	Greece
17	South Korea
17	Venezuela
21	Australia
21	Egypt
21	Iran
21	Kazakhstan

2006 Men's World champions

Brazil
2nd title

12–man Roster
Marcelo Elgarten, André Heller, Giba, Murilo Endres, André Nascimento, Sérgio Santos, Anderson Rodrigues, Samuel Fuchs, Gustavo Endres, Rodrigão, Ricardo Garcia (c), Dante Amaral
Head coach
Bernardo Rezende

== Awards ==
- Most valuable player
  (Brazil) Gilberto Godoy Filho
- Best scorer
  (Puerto Rico) Héctor Soto
- Best spiker
  (Brazil) Dante Amaral
- Best blocker
  (Russia) Aleksey Kuleshov
- Best server
  (Bulgaria) Matey Kaziyski
- Best setter
  (Poland) Paweł Zagumny
- Best libero
  (Russia) Aleksey Verbov

== Marketing ==
=== Official song ===
The competition's official opening song was "Ready Go!" by Morning Musume .

=== Sponsors ===
- Nippon Life
- Japan Tobacco
- Kyocera
- Asahi Soft Drinks

== Broadcasting ==
Region	TV station
Worldwide	TBS; BS-TBS

== See also ==
- 2006 FIVB Women's Volleyball World Championship
