= 3x3 basketball at the 2019 European Games =

- Venue: Palova Arena
- Dates: 21–24 June
- Competitors: 127 from 20 nations

Basketball competitions at the 2019 European Games were held from 21 to 24 June 2019 at the Palova Arena in Minsk. The competition took place in the half-court 3x3 format, and both the men's and women's tournaments featured sixteen teams. Each qualifying team consisted of four players, of whom three could appear on court at any one time.

The 2019 FIBA 3x3 World Cup was held on overlapping days in Amsterdam, the Netherlands.

== Qualification ==
A NOC may enter one men's team with four players and one women's team with four players. The host country qualifies automatically in each tournament, as do the top fifteen other teams at the FIBA 3x3 Federation World Ranking.

=== Qualified teams ===
Qualified as	Date	Men	Women
Host country	–	Belarus	Belarus
FIBA 3x3 Federation Ranking	1 November 2018	Serbia; Russia; Latvia; Slovenia; Ukraine; Lithuania; Netherlands; Poland; Estonia; Romania; France; Czech Republic; Turkey; Italy; Andorra	Ukraine; France; Russia; Andorra; Netherlands; Hungary; Romania; Italy; Czech Republic; Switzerland; Latvia; Spain; Estonia; Germany; Serbia
Total		16	16

== Medal summary ==
Event	Gold	Silver	Bronze
Men	Russia; Ilia Karpenkov; Kirill Pisklov; Stanislav Sharov; Alexey Zherdev	Latvia; Armands Ginters; Roberts Pāže; Armands Seņkāns; Mārtiņš Šteinbergs	Belarus; Maxim Liutych; Mikita Meshcharakou; Andrei Rahozenka; Siarhei Vabishchevich
Women	France; Mousdandy Djaldi-Tabdi; Caroline Hériaud; Assitan Koné; Johanna Tayeau	Estonia; Merike Anderson; Kadri-Ann Lass; Annika Köster; Janne Pulk	Belarus; Natallia Dashkevich; Maryna Ivashchanka; Darya Mahalias; Anastasiya Sushczyk
