= Andorra at the 2019 European Games =

- IOC code: AND
- NOC: Andorran Olympic Committee
- Website: www.coa.ad

in Minsk, Belarus 21–30 June
- Competitors: 12 in 5 sports
- Medals Ranked 44th: Gold 0 Silver 0 Bronze 0 Total 0

European Games appearances (overview)
- 2015; 2019; 2023; 2027

Andorra competed at the 2019 European Games in Minsk from 21 to 30 June 2019. Andorra was represented by 12 athletes in 5 sports.

== Competitors ==
Sport	Men	Women	Total
3x3 Basketball	4	4	8
Cycling	1	0	1
Judo	1	0	1
Karate	1	0	1
Shooting	0	1	1
Total	7	5	12

== Basketball 3x3 ==
Team roster

Men

- Alexis Bartolome
- Oriol Fernandez
- Cinto Gabriel
- Hugo Schneider

Summary

Team	Event	Group stage				Quarterfinals	Semifinals	Final / BM	
Team	Event	Opposition Score	Opposition Score	Opposition Score	Rank	Opposition Score	Opposition Score	Opposition Score	Rank
Andorra men's	Men's tournament	Serbia; L 8–22	Romania; L 19–21	Poland; L 12–21	4	did not advance			

Team roster

Women

- Cristina Andres
- Claudia Brunet
- Anna Mana
- Alba Pla

Summary

Team	Event	Group stage				Quarterfinals	Semifinals	Final / BM	
Team	Event	Opposition Score	Opposition Score	Opposition Score	Rank	Opposition Score	Opposition Score	Opposition Score	Rank
Andorra women's	Women's tournament	France; L 9–20	Netherlands; L 7–16	Switzerland; L 5–18	4	did not advance			

== Cycling ==
=== Road ===
Athlete	Event	Time	Rank
Samuel Ponce	Road race	did not finish	

== Judo ==
Men

Athlete	Event	Round of 64	Round of 32	Round of 16	Quarterfinals	Semifinals	Repechage	Final / BM	
Athlete	Event	Opposition Result	Opposition Result	Opposition Result	Opposition Result	Opposition Result	Opposition Result	Opposition Result	Rank
Fabian Ramos	–73 kg	Raicu (ROU); L 0–10	did not advance						

== Karate ==
Kata

Athletes	Event	Elimination round		Ranking Round		Final / BM	
Athletes	Event	Score	Rank	Score	Rank	Opposition Score	Rank
Silvio Moreira	Men's	19.92	4	did not advance			

== Shooting ==
Athlete	Event	Qualification		Final	
Athlete	Event	Points	Rank	Points	Rank
Esther Barrugués	Women's 10 m air rifle	did not start		did not advance	
