= 2006 FIVB Men's Volleyball World Championship qualification (CSV) =

The CSV qualification for the 2006 FIVB Men's Volleyball World Championship saw member nations compete for two places at the finals in Japan.

== Draw ==
Seven CSV national teams entered qualification. The teams were distributed according to their position in the FIVB Senior Men's Rankings as of 15 January 2004 using the serpentine system for their distribution. (Rankings shown in brackets)

First round

Pool A	Pool B
Argentina (8); Paraguay (32); Uruguay (—)	Venezuela (11); Colombia (70); Ecuador (—); Peru (—)

== First round ==
=== Pool A ===
- Venue: Polideportivo Islas Malvinas, Mar del Plata, Argentina
- Dates: 6–8 May 2005
- All times are Argentina Time (UTC−03:00)

Pos	Team	Pld	W	L	Pts	SW	SL	SR	SPW	SPL	SPR
1	Argentina	2	2	0	4	6	0	MAX	151	91	1.659
2	Paraguay	2	1	1	3	3	4	0.750	147	167	0.880
3	Uruguay	2	0	2	2	1	6	0.167	130	170	0.765

Date	Time		Score		Set 1	Set 2	Set 3	Set 4	Set 5	Total	Report
06 May	21:00	Argentina	3–0	Uruguay	25–13	25–13	25–13			75–39	Report
07 May	21:00	Paraguay	3–1	Uruguay	19–25	25–23	26–24	25–19		95–91	Report
08 May	18:00	Argentina	3–0	Paraguay	25–7	26–24	25–21			76–52	Report

=== Pool B ===
- Venue: Gimnasio Gastón Portillo, Caracas, Venezuela
- Dates: 22–24 July 2005
- All times are Venezuelan Standard Time (UTC−04:30)

Pos	Team	Pld	W	L	Pts	SW	SL	SR	SPW	SPL	SPR
1	Venezuela	3	3	0	6	9	1	9.000	248	189	1.312
2	Colombia	3	2	1	5	7	4	1.750	262	215	1.219
3	Peru	3	1	2	4	4	8	0.500	223	265	0.842
4	Ecuador	3	0	3	3	2	9	0.222	195	259	0.753

Date	Time		Score		Set 1	Set 2	Set 3	Set 4	Set 5	Total	Report
22 Jul	16:00	Peru	3–2	Ecuador	21–25	25–16	25–19	23–25	15–8	109–93	Report
22 Jul	18:00	Venezuela	3–1	Colombia	25–21	23–25	25–21	25–23		98–90	Report
23 Jul	16:00	Colombia	3–0	Ecuador	25–15	25–14	25–18			75–47	Report
23 Jul	18:00	Venezuela	3–0	Peru	25–16	25–13	25–15			75–44	Report
24 Jul	16:00	Colombia	3–1	Peru	25–18	22–25	25–11	25–16		97–70	Report
24 Jul	18:00	Venezuela	3–0	Ecuador	25–20	25–19	25–16			75–55	Report
