= Maryna Ivashchanka =

Belarusian basketball player

No. 25 – Energa Toruń
- Position: Power forward
- League: PLKK

Personal information
- Born: November 8, 1993 (age 31) Rechytsa, Belarus
- Listed height: 6 ft 3 in (1.91 m)
Medals
Women's 3x3 basketball
Representing Belarus
European Games
Bronze medal – third place	2019 Minsk	Team

Maryna Ivashchanka (born November 8, 1993) is a Belarusian basketball player for Energa Toruń and the Belarusian national team.

She participated at the EuroBasket Women 2017, and 2019 European Games, winning a bronze medal.
