= Maciej Adamkiewicz =

Polish pharmacist (1966–2025)

Maciej Adamkiewicz (18 October 1966 – 23 October 2025) was a Polish pharmaceutical businessman and surgeon.

== Life and career ==
Adamkiewicz studied at the Medical University of Warsaw, where he specialized in surgery. From 1991 he worked in the surgery department at the Bielański Hospital in Warsaw and later in his father's company – Adamed. In 2000, after the death of his father, he took over the company. He was a member of the International Urogynecological Society and the Polish Menopause and Andropause Society.

Together with his wife, he built a four-star hotel "Narvil" in Serock.

In 2021 he and his wife were ranked 9th on the list of the richest Poles according to Forbes magazine with a fortune of PLN 4.703 billion. In 2023 their wealth was estimated at PLN 2.363 billion, and the couple was ranked 22nd on the list.

Adamkiewicz died on 23 October 2025, at the age of 59.

== Awards ==
- Stanisław Biniecki Medal (2008)
- Golden Cross of Merit (2013) – for merits in social activities for people in need of help and support.
