= Kadri-Ann Lass =

Estonian basketball player (born 1996)

Personal information
- Born: November 24, 1996 (age 29)
- Listed height: 6 ft 3 in (1.91 m)

Career information
- High school: Audentes Sports Gymnasium (Tallinn, Estonia)
- College: Duquesne (2015–2019)
- WNBA draft: 2019: undrafted
- Position: Shooting guard / small forward

Career highlights
- 2× Atlantic 10 All-Defensive team (2018, 2019); Atlantic 10 All-Freshman team (2016)
Medals
Women's 3x3 basketball
Representing Estonia
European Games
Silver medal – second place	2019 Minsk	Team

Kadri-Ann Lass (born 24 November 1996) is an Estonian women's basketball guard and forward.

After playing D1 Basketball at Duquesne University for 4 years, where she earned a degree in environmental science, Lass played professionally for 4 years in Poland, Hungary and Spain. Lass has represented Estonia for many years in both 5x5 and 3x3 women's basketball.

== Career ==
=== College career ===
Lass started studying at Duquesne University and playing for their basketball team in NCAA Division I in 2015. In her freshman season, she set a program record by being named the A-10 Rookie of the Week seven times, besting Korie Hlede. Although the favorite to be named 2016 Rookie of the Year, she was ousted by Dayton's Lauren Cannatelli. However, she was named to the A-10 All-Rookie Team. Following the 2017–18 season, Lass was named to the Atlantic 10 All-Defensive team after leading the league and all NCAA juniors in blocks with 90. On Jan. 25, 2018, she became the program's all-time leader in blocked shots with 282.

She was recently inducted into Duquesne University's Hall of Fame, along with her teammates from the 2015-2016 women's basketball team.

The

=== Duquesne statistics ===
Legend
GP	Games played	GS	Games started	MPG	Minutes per game
FG%	Field goal percentage	3P%	3-point field goal percentage	FT%	Free throw percentage
RPG	Rebounds per game	APG	Assists per game	SPG	Steals per game
BPG	Blocks per game	PPG	Points per game	**Bold**	Career high

Year	Team	GP	Points	FG%	3P%	FT%	RPG	APG	SPG	BPG	PPG
2015-16	Duquesne	**34**	**381**	**45.1%**	35.0%	68.8%	5.9	1.6	0.5	1.9	11.2
2016-17	Duquesne	**34**	270	38.9%	36.1%	60.6%	4.5	1.7	0.6	1.5	7.9
2017-18	Duquesne	33	359	44.7%	**41.5%**	66.7%	**6.5**	**1.8**	**0.7**	**2.9**	**10.9**
2018-19	Duquesne	32	348	43.2%	25.8%	**71.7%**	5.8	1.2	0.6	2.2	10.9
Career		133	1358	43.2%	34.5%	67.7%	5.6	1.6	0.6	2.1	10.2

=== International career ===
Lass played for the Estonia national basketball team in U16 and U18 age groups, and also appeared in several international competitions with the national 3x3 team including 3x3 World Championships, 3x3 U18 World Championships and 2014 Summer Youth Olympics. Her debut for Estonia women's national basketball team came in 2015.

In 2019, Lass won a silver medal with the Estonia national 3x3 team at the 2019 European Games. Named Best Forward by Eurobasket.com

In August 2019, Lass joined Wisla Krakow, starting her professional career in Europe. In 2019 she played with the Wisła Can-Pack Kraków. From 2020 - 2021, she played in Hungary for UNI Gyor, as a power forward.

After Hungary, Lass turned her eyes to Spain, where she played for two consecutive seasons. From August 2021 until May 2022, she played for CB Bembibre and from August 2022 until January 2023, she played for IDK Euskotren, in San Sebastian.
