= Kirill Pisklov =

Russian basketball player (born 1996)

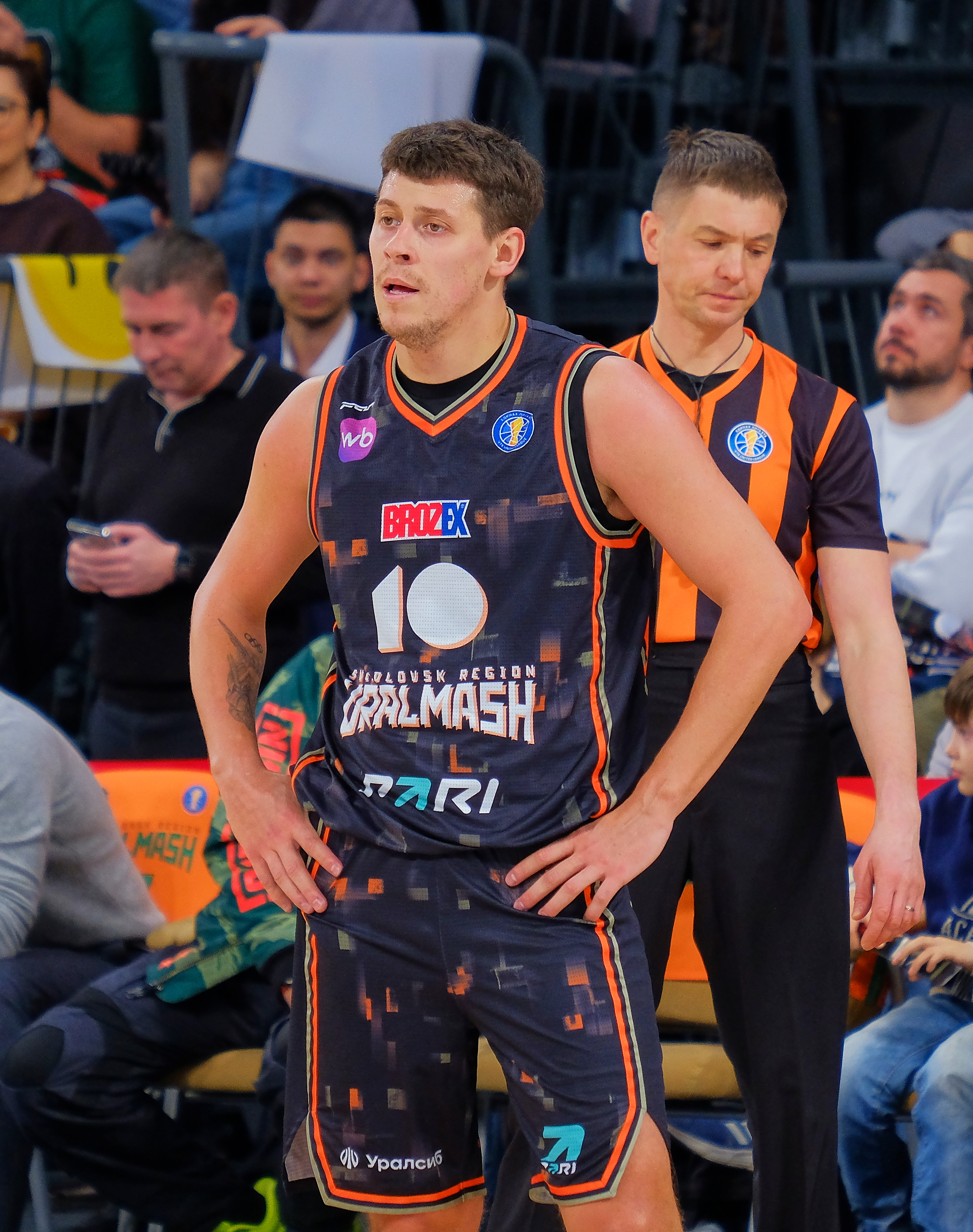
- Pisklov with BC Uralmash in 2025

No. 10 – Uralmash Yekaterinburg
- Position: Guard/forward
- League: VTB United League

Personal information
- Born: 22 September 1996 (age 30) Chelyabinsk, Russia
- Listed height: 1.92 m (6 ft 4 in)
- Listed weight: 90 kg (198 lb)

Career information
- NBA draft: 2018: undrafted
- Playing career: 2014–present

Career history
- 2014–2015: Dynamo Moscow
- 2015–2016: MBA Moscow
- 2016–2019: Novosibirsk
- 2019–2020: Spartak Primorye
- 2020–present: Uralmash Yekaterinburg
Medals
Men's 3x3 basketball
Representing (Russia) ROC
Olympic Games
Silver medal – second place	2020 Tokyo	Team
Representing Russia
European Games
Gold medal – first place	2019 Minsk	Team

Kirill Eduardovich Pisklov (Russian: Кирилл Эдуардович Писклов, IPA: [kʲɪˈrʲiɫ pʲɪˈskɫof]; born 22 September 1996) is a Russian basketball player for Uralmash Yekaterinburg and the Russian 3x3 national team.

He represented Russian Olympic Committee (ROC) at the 2020 Summer Olympics.
