= Stanislav Sharov =

Russian basketball player

Personal information
- Born: 29 May 1995 (age 31) Gusev, Russia
- Listed height: 1.91 m (6 ft 3 in)
- Listed weight: 95 kg (209 lb)

Career information
- NBA draft: 2017: undrafted
- Position: Guard
Medals
Men's 3x3 basketball
Representing (Russia) ROC
Olympic Games
Silver medal – second place	2020 Tokyo	Team
Representing Russia
European Games
Gold medal – first place	2019 Minsk	Team

Stanislav Spartakovich Sharov (Russian: Станислав Спартакович Шаров, IPA: [stənʲɪˈslaf ʂɐˈrof]; born 29 May 1995) is a Russian basketball player for the Russian 3x3 national team.

He represented Russian Olympic Committee (ROC) at the 2020 Summer Olympics.
