= 2006 FIVB Men's Volleyball World Championship qualification =

- Dates: 13 January 2005 – 28 August 2005
- Teams: 94 (from 5 confederations)

24 teams competed in the 2006 FIVB Men's Volleyball World Championship, with two places allocated for the hosts, Japan and the titleholder, Brazil. In the qualification process for the 2006 FIVB World Championship, the Five FIVB confederations were allocated a share of the 22 remaining spots.

== Confederation qualification processes ==
The distribution by confederation for the 2006 FIVB Men's Volleyball World Championship was:

- Asia and Oceania (AVC): 5 places (+ Japan qualified automatically as host nation for a total of 6 places)
- Africa (CAVB): 2 places
- Europe (CEV): 9 places
- South America (CSV) 2 places (+ Brazil qualified automatically as the defending champions for a total of 3 places)
- North America (NORCECA): 4 places

=== AVC ===
- Afghanistan (First Round)
- Australia (Second Round, Playoff Round)
- China (Second Round)
- Chinese Taipei (First Round, Second Round)
- India (Second Round, Playoff Round)
- Indonesia (First Round, Second Round)
- Iran (Second Round)
- Jordan (First Round)
- Kazakhstan (Second Round)
- Macau (First Round)
- Maldives (First Round)
- Oman (First Round)
- Philippines (First Round)
- Qatar (First Round, Second Round)
- South Korea (Second Round, Playoff Round)
- Tonga (First Round)
- Thailand (First Round, Second Round)
- United Arab Emirates (First Round, Second Round)
- Uzbekistan (First Round, Second Round)

=== CAVB ===
- Algeria (Second Round)
- Botswana (First Round)
- Cameroon (Second Round)
- DR Congo (Second Round)
- Egypt (Second Round)
- Eritrea (First Round)
- Ghana (First Round)
- Mauritius (First Round)
- Morocco (Second Round)
- South Africa (First Round, Second Round)
- Sudan (First Round, Second Round)
- Tunisia (Second Round)
- Uganda (First Round)

=== CEV ===
- Albania (First Round)
- Austria (Second Round)
- Azerbaijan (First Round)
- Belarus (First Round)
- Belgium (First Round)
- Bosnia and Herzegovina (First Round)
- Bulgaria (Second Round, Third Round, Playoff Round)
- Croatia (Second Round)
- Czech Republic (Second Round, Third Round)
- Denmark (Second Round)
- England (First Round, Second Round)
- Estonia (First Round, Second Round, Third Round)
- Finland (Second Round, Third Round)
- France (Third Round)
- Germany (Second Round, Third Round)
- Greece (Third Round)
- Hungary (First Round)
- Israel (First Round)
- Italy (Third Round)
- Latvia (Second Round)
- Moldova (First Round)
- Netherlands (Third Round, Playoff Round)
- Northern Ireland (First Round)
- Norway (First Round)
- Poland (Third Round)
- Portugal (Second Round, Third Round, Playoff Round)
- Romania (First Round, Second Round)
- Russia (Third Round)
- Scotland (First Round)
- Serbia and Montenegro (Third Round)
- Slovakia (Second Round)
- Slovenia (First Round, Second Round)
- Spain (Third Round)
- Turkey (Second Round, Third Round)
- Ukraine (Second Round, Third Round, Playoff Round)

=== CSV ===
- Argentina (First Round)
- Colombia (First Round)
- Ecuador (First Round)
- Paraguay (First Round)
- Peru (First Round)
- Uruguay (First Round)
- Venezuela (First Round)

=== NORCECA ===
- Anguilla (First Round)
- Barbados (First Round, Second Round)
- British Virgin Islands (First Round)
- Canada (Second Round)
- Cayman Islands (First Round)
- Costa Rica (First Round, Second Round)
- Cuba (Second Round)
- Dominica (First Round)
- Guatemala (First Round, Second Round)
- Honduras (First Round)
- Jamaica (First Round)
- Mexico (Second Round)
- Netherlands Antilles (First Round)
- Nicaragua (First Round)
- Panama (Second Round)
- Puerto Rico (Second Round)
- Saint Kitts and Nevis (First Round)
- Saint Lucia (First Round)
- Trinidad and Tobago (First Round, Second Round)
- United States (Second Round)
