= Serpentine system =

Organization method used in competitions

The serpentine system, also known as snake seeding, is a method of organization used in competitions to define the seeded teams and arrange them into pools. The n ranked teams that will be involved in the tournament are distributed in m pools according to the following algorithm:

Pool 1	Pool 2	. . .	Pool m − 1	Pool m
1	2	. . .	m − 1	m
2m	2m − 1	. . .	m + 2	m + 1
2m + 1	2m + 2	. . .	3m − 1	3m
...				

For instance, 12 teams would be organized in four-team pools as follows:

Pool 1	Pool 2	Pool 3
1	2	3
6	5	4
7	8	9
12	11	10

To improve competitivity, this method is sometimes used in conjunction with the drawing of lots. The serpentine system is used only for some of the teams involved in the competition ("seeds"), and the rest are distributed in pools following a drawing of lots.
