= 2019 European 10 m Events Championships =

- Dates: 16 - 25 March
- Host city: Osijek, Croatia
- Venue: Gradski vrt Hall
- Level: Senior
- Events: 4 men + 4 women

The 2019 European 10 m Events Championships was held in Osijek, Croatia, from March 17 to 24, 2019. The competition was held in the Gradski vrt Hall.

== Medal table ==
Rank	Country	Gold	Silver	Bronze	Total
1	Russia	10	3	7	20
2	Ukraine	3	6	1	10
3	Italy	1	2	1	4
4	Finland	1	1	1	3
5	Sweden	1	1	0	2
6	Germany	1	0	2	3
7	Romania	1	0	1	2
8	Poland	1	0	0	1
9	Serbia	0	2	1	3
10	France	0	1	0	1
10	Greece	0	1	0	1
10	Czech Republic	0	1	0	1
10	Switzerland	0	1	0	1
14	Armenia	0	0	2	2
14	Hungary	0	0	2	2
16	Austria	0	0	1	1
	TOTAL	19	19	19	57

== Results ==
=== Men ===
Event	Gold	Silver	Bronze
Rifle	Vladimir Maslennikov; Russia	Brian Baudouin; France	Evgeny Panchenko; Russia
Rifle team	Russia; Vladimir Maslennikov; Evgeny Panchenko; Alexander Dryagin	Serbia; Lazar Kovačević; Milutin Stefanović; Milenko Sebić	Hungary; István Péni; Péter Sidi; Peter Somogyi
Pistol	Pavlo Korostylov; Ukraine	Damir Mikec; Serbia	Giuseppe Giordano; Italy
Pistol team	Italy; Giuseppe Giordano; Paolo Monna; Alessio Torracchi	Ukraine; Pavlo Korostylov; Oleh Omelchuk; Denys Kushnirov	Russia; Artem Chernousov; Vadim Mukhametyanov; Nikolai Kilin
Running target	Vladislav Prianishnikov; Russia	Aleksandr Blinov; Russia	Ihor Kizyma; Ukraine
Running target team	Russia; Maxim Stepanov; Vladislav Prianishnikov; Aleksandr Blinov	Sweden; Emil Martinsson; Jesper Nyberg; Niklas Bergström	Finland; Heikki Lahdekorpi; Krister Holmberg; Niklas Hyvärinen
Running target mixed	Krister Holmberg; Finland	Jonáš Bedřich; Czech Republic	Vladislav Prianishnikov; Russia
Running target mixed team	Sweden; Jesper Nyberg; Emil Martinsson; Niklas Bergström	Finland; Krister Holmberg; Niklas Hyvärinen; Heikki Lahdekorpi	Russia; Vladislav Prianishnikov; Maxim Stepanov; Aleksandr Blinov

=== Women ===
Event	Gold	Silver	Bronze
Rifle	Laura-Georgeta Coman; Romania	Nina Christen; Switzerland	Franziska Peer; Austria
Rifle team	Russia; Yulia Karimova; Anastasiia Galashina; Daria Vdovina	Italy; Petra Zublasing; Alessandra Luciani; Martina Ziviani	Romania; Laura-Georgeta Coman; Roxana Sidi; Eliza Molnar
Pistol	Klaudia Breś; Poland	Anna Korakaki; Greece	Veronika Major; Hungary
Pistol team	Germany; Sandra Reitz; Monika Karsch; Doreen Vennekamp	Ukraine; Olena Kostevych; Hanna Levkovska; Polina Konarieva	Russia; Svetlana Medvedeva; Vitalina Batsarashkina; Ekaterina Korshunova
Running target	Julia Eydenzon; Russia	Halyna Avramenko; Ukraine	Olga Stepanova; Russia
Running target team	Russia; Olga Stepanova; Julia Eydenzon; Irina Izmalkova	Ukraine; Halyna Avramenko; Viktoriya Rybovalova; Valentyna Honcharova	Armenia; Lilit Mkrtchyan; Gohar Harutyunyan; Arusyak Grigoryan
Running target mixed	Halyna Avramenko; Ukraine	Olga Stepanova; Russia	Julia Eydenzon; Russia
Running target mixed team	Russia; Olga Stepanova; Julia Eydenzon; Irina Izmalkova	Ukraine; Halyna Avramenko; Viktoriya Rybovalova; Valentyna Honcharova	Armenia; Lilit Mkrtchyan; Gohar Harutyunyan; Arusyak Grigoryan

=== Mixed events ===
Event	Gold	Silver	Bronze
Rifle	Russia; Anastasiia Galashina; Vladimir Maslennikov	Italy; Petra Zublasing; Marco Suppini	Germany; Julia Simon; Julian Justus
Pistol	Ukraine; Olena Kostevych; Oleh Omelchuk	Russia; Vitalina Batsarashkina; Artem Chernousov	Serbia; Zorana Arunović; Damir Mikec
Running target mixed	Russia; Maxim Stepanov; Olga Stepanova	Ukraine; Ihor Kizyma; Halyna Avramenko	Germany; Kris Großheim; Daniela Volgelbacher

== See also ==
- European Shooting Confederation
- International Shooting Sport Federation
- List of medalists at the European Shooting Championships
- List of medalists at the European Shotgun Championships
