= Şimal Yılmaz =

Turkish sport shooter (born 2003)

Personal information
- Born: 21 June 2003 (age 23) Antalya, Turkey
- Education: Political Science and International Relations at Çankaya University

Sport
- Sport: Shooting
Medal record
Women's sport shooting
Representing Turkey
World Championships
Bronze medal – third place	2025 Cairo	25 m std pistol team
European Championships
Gold medal – first place	2025 Osijek	10 m air pistol trio
Silver medal – second place	2024 Györ	10 m air pistol
Bronze medal – third place	2025 Osijek	10 m air pistol team
Bronze medal – third place	2026 Yerevan	10 m air pistol trio
ISSF World Cup
Bronze medal – third place	2023 Baku	10 m air pistol Mixed team
Mediterranean Games
Gold medal – first place	2026 Taranto	10 m air pistol mixed team
European Junior Championships
Silver medal – second place	2021 Osijek	10 m air pistol team
Silver medal – second place	2022 Hamar	10 m air pistol

Şimal Yılmaz (born 21 June 2003) is a Turkish sport shooter who competes in the 10-metre (33 ft) air pistol event. She has won three silver medals at European level by competing in the European 10-metre Events Championship, and holds the Turkish record in the 10-metre air pistol.

== Personal life ==
Şimal Yılmaz was born in Antalya, Turkey, on 21 June 2003. After graduating from high school, she attended Çankaya University in Ankara to study political science and international relations at the university's Faculty of Economics and Administrative Sciences.

== Sport career ==
Şimal Yılmaz's father built her a shooting range in the living room of their home in Antalya, Turkey. She was coached by Tayfun Salim Kır, and won a bronze and a silver medal in the youth category of the Turkish championships.

Yilmaz won the silver medal with Yasemin Beyza Yılmaz and İlayda Nur Çürük in the junior 10-metre (33 ft) air pistol team event at the 2021 European Championship in Osijek, Croatia. She won the silver medal in the junior 10-metre air pistol event at the 2022 European Championships in Hamar, Norway. Yilmaz attended Çankaya University in Ankara, Turkey, and competed in the 10-metre air pistol event at the Intercollegiate Shooting Turkish Championships. In 2022 at Sakarya, she won the silver medal and in 2023 at Trabzon, she was placed fifth. At the fifth stage of the 2023 ISSF World Cup in Baku, Azerbaijan, Yilmaz won the bronze medal in the mixed team 10-metre air pistol event with İsmail Keleş.

At the H&N Cup in Munich, Germany, in January 2024, Yilmaz set a new Turkish record in the 10-metre air pistol event with 579 points. She finished the competition and won the gold medal with 241.5 points. She won the silver medal at the 2024 European 10-metre Events Championships in Győr, Hungary, and secured a spot in the 2024 Summer Olympics.

She won the gold medal in the 10m air pisto trio event with her teammates Esra Bozabalı and Şevval İlayda Tarhan at the 2025 European 10 m Events Championships in Osijek, Croatia.
