= Şevval İlayda Tarhan =

Turkish sports shooter (born 2000)

Personal information
- Nationality: Turkish
- Born: 4 February 2000 (age 26) Ankara, Turkey
- Education: Sports science at Gazi University

Sport
- Sport: Sports shooting
Medal record
Women's shooting
Representing Turkey
Olympic Games
Silver medal – second place	2024 Paris	10 m air pistol Mixed team
World Championships
Gold medal – first place	2026 Doha	50 m pistol
Silver medal – second place	2023 Baku	10 m air pistol Mixed team
Silver medal – second place	2025 Cairo	25 m std pistol
Bronze medal – third place	2025 Cairo	25 m std pistol team
European Championships
Gold medal – first place	2025 Osijek	10 m air pistol
Gold medal – first place	2025 Osijek	10 m air pistol trio
Gold medal – first place	2025 Osijek	10 m air pistol Mixed team
Silver medal – second place	2026 Yerevan	10 m air pistol Mixed team
Bronze medal – third place	2023 Tallinn	10 m air pistol Mixed team
Bronze medal – third place	2025 Osijek	10 m air pistol solo
Bronze medal – third place	2025 Osijek	10 m air pistol team
Bronze medal – third place	2026 Yerevan	10 m air pistol trio
Bronze medal – third place	2026 Osijek	25 m standard pistol
World Cup
Bronze medal – third place	2022 Baku	10 m air pistol Mixed team
Mediterranean Games
Silver medal – second place	2026 Taranto	10 m air pistol mixed team
Bronze medal – third place	2026 Taranto	10 m air pistol
World Junior Championships
Gold medal – first place	2018 Changwon	10 m air pistol junior
European Junior Championships
Gold medal – first place	2019 Osijek	10 m air pistol junior
Junior World Cup
Gold medal – first place	2019 Suhl	10 m air pistol junior

Şevval İlayda Tarhan (born 4 February 2000) is a world and European champion Turkish sports shooter competing in the 10 m air pistol event. She is the holder of the European women's team record and an Olympic silver medal.

== Personal life ==
Şevval İlayda Tarhan was born on 4 February 2000. She is a student of Sports Science at Gazi University in Ankara.

== Sport career ==
Tarhan started her sports shooting career when encouraged by her mother. In her childhood she had been interested in firearms and uniforms, and dreamed of becoming a policewoman or career in the military, a first in her family. She has been competing in the 10 m air pistol event since 2015. She is a member of Ankara Ottoman Shooting Club.

At the 2018 ISSF World Shooting Championships in Changwon, South Korea, she set a new national junior record with 237.9 points, and won the gold medal as a Junior.

At the 2019 European 10 m Events Championships in Osijek, Croatia, Tarhan set a new European Junior record in the 10 m air pistol event, and took the gold medal in the Junior category. In the Suhl, Germany, leg of the 2019 ISSF Junior World Cup, she captured the gold medal.

She took the bronze medal in the Mixed team event with Yusuf Dikeç at the Baku, Azerbaijan leg of the 2022 ISSF World Cup. At the 2022 Mediterranean Games in Oran, Algeria, she placed fourth. At the 2022 European 10 m Events Championships in Hamar, Norway, she and her teammates Elif Beyza Aşık and Seher Tokmak set a new European women's team record in 10 m with 861 points.

She received the bronze medal in the Mixed team event of the 2023 European 10 m Events Championships in Tallinn, Estonia. At the 2023 ISSF World Shooting Championships in Baku, Azerbaijan, she took the silver medal in the Mixed team event with teammate Yusuf Dikeç. At the 2023 European Games in Wrocław, Poland, she qualified for the ranking match, failed, however, to win a medal. She competed also in the 25 m air pistol event of the same competition without success.

She and her teammate Yusuf Dikeç won the silver medal in the 10 m air pistol Mixed team event at the 2024 Summer Olympics in Paris, France after losing to the Serbian team in the final.

She won the bronze medal in the 10m air pistol solo event, the gold medal with her teammate Yusuf Dikeç in the 10m air pistol mixed team event, and the gold medal in the 10m air pisto trio event with her teammates Esra Bozabalı and Şimal Yılmaz at the 2025 European 10 m Events Championships in Osijek, Croatia.
