= Seher Tokmak =

Turkish sports shooter

Personal information
- Nationality: Turkish
- Born: 12 April 1999 (age 27) Bolu, Turkey
- Education: Bolu Abant Izzet Baysal University

Sport
- Sport: Sports shooting
Medal record
Women's Sports shooting
Representing Turkey

Seher Tokmak (born 12 April 1999) is a Turkish sports shooter competing in the 10m air pistol event. She set new national records.

== Sport career ==
She won the junior team event at the 2015 National Sovereignty Aİr Firearms Cup. At the 2015 Atatürk Air Firearms Cup, she placed third in the individual, and second in the team event of the junior category.

At the 2022 European 10 m Events Championships in Hamar, Norway, she and her teammates Şevval İlayda Tarhan and Elif Beyza Aşık set a new European women's team record in 10 m with 861 points.

In April 2023, she set a new national record with 577 points, and became champion in the Turkish Universities Shooting Championship. She defended her title the next year's championship.

== Personal life ==
Seher Tokmak was born in Bolu, Turkey on 12 April 1999. She is a student in Bolu Abant Izzet Baysal University.
