= Elif Beyza Aşık =

Turkish sports shooter

Personal information
- Nationality: Turkish
- Born: 4 September 1994 (age 31) Turkey
- Education: Business administration at Ankara Yıldırım Beyazıt University

Sport
- Sport: Sports shooting
Medal record
Women's Sports shooting
Representing Turkey

Elif Beyza Aşık (born 4 September 1994) is a Turkish sports shooter competing in the 10m air pistol event. She set new national and European women's team records. She is also a licensed coach.

== Sport career ==
Representing her university at the Turkish Universities Shooting Championship in Sakarya, she placed third in the individual event in 2016, and became the runner-up in the team event in 2017.

She and her teammates set a new national record in the senior women's team event at the 2018 Turkish Air Firearms Championship in Mersin, and won the first place.

She took part at the 2022 Mediterranean Games in Oran, Algeria, placing sixth. At the 2022 European 10 m Events Championships in Hamar, Norway, she and her teammates Şevval İlayda Tarhan and Seher Tokmak set a new European women's team record in 10 m with 861 points.

Aşık also serves as a licensed coach.

== Personal life ==
Elif Beyza Aşık was born on 4 September 1994. She studied at the Faculty of Business Administration in Ankara Yıldırım Beyazıt University.
