= 2025 European Shooting Championship =

2025 European Shooting Championship may refer to:

- 2025 European Shooting Championships
- 2025 European 10 m Events Championships
