= 2022 World Running Target Championships =

Shooting competition

- Venue: Châteauroux, France
- Location: (France) Châteauroux
- Dates: 2–9 August 2022

The 2022 World Running Target Championships were originally scheduled to be held from 20 to 30 September 2021 in Châteauroux, France, but have been postponed until 2022.

== Schedule ==
All times are Central European Summer Time (UTC+2).

| Date | Time | Event |
|---|---|---|
| 3 August | 09:00 | 50m Running Target Men Slow Run |
| 3 August | 09:00 | 50m Running Target Men Junior Slow Run |
| 4 August | 09:00 | 50m Running Target Men Fast Run |
| 4 August | 09:00 | 50m Running Target Men Junior Fast Run |
| 5 August | 09:00 | 50m Running Target Mixed Men |
| 5 August | 09:00 | 50m Running Target Mixed Men Junior |
| 7 August | 09:00 | 10m Running Target Men Slow Run |
| 7 August | 09:00 | 10m Running Target Men Junior Slow Run |
| 7 August | 09:00 | 10m Running Target Women Slow Run |
| 7 August | 09:00 | 10m Running Target Women Junior Slow Run |
| 8 August | 09:00 | 10m Running Target Men Fast Run |
| 8 August | 09:00 | 10m Running Target Men Junior Fast Run |
| 8 August | 09:00 | 10m Running Target Women Fast Run |
| 8 August | 09:00 | 10m Running Target Women Junior Fast Run |
| 8 August | 14:00 | Medal Match 10m Running Target Men |
| 8 August | 14:00 | Medal Match 10m Running Target Men Junior |
| 8 August | 14:00 | Medal Match 10m Running Target Women |
| 8 August | 14:00 | Medal Match 10m Running Target Women Junior |
| 9 August | 09:00 | 10m Running Target Mixed Men |
| 9 August | 09:00 | 10m Running Target Mixed Men Junior |
| 9 August | 09:00 | 10m Running Target Mixed Women |
| 9 August | 09:00 | 10m Running Target Mixed Women Junior |

== Medalists ==
=== Men ===
| Event | Gold | Silver | Bronze |
10 metre running target
| Individual | Emil Martinsson (SWE) | Ihor Kizyma (UKR) | Łukasz Czapla (POL) |
| Individual Team | Sweden (SWE) | Hungary (HUN) | Finland (FIN) |
| Mixed | Ihor Kizyma (UKR) | Denys Babliuk (UKR) | Emil Martinsson (SWE) |
| Mixed Team | Sweden (SWE) | South Korea (KOR) | Finland (FIN) |
| Junior individual | Roman Chadai (UKR) | Danylo Danilenko (UKR) | Aaro Vuorimaa (FIN) |
| Mixed junior | Gor Khachatryan (ARM) | Aaro Vuorimaa (FIN) | Roman Chadai (UKR) |
50 metre running target
| Individual | Ihor Kizyma (UKR) | Emil Martinsson (SWE) | József Sike (HUN) |
| Mixed | Emil Martinsson (SWE) | Jesper Nyberg (SWE) | Ihor Kizyma (UKR) |
| Junior individual | Aaro Vuorimaa (FIN) | Roman Chadai (UKR) | Kyrylo Itulin (UKR) |
| Mixed junior | Roman Chadai (UKR) | Aaro Vuorimaa (FIN) | Mats Eliasson (SWE) |

=== Women ===
| Event | Gold | Silver | Bronze |
10 metre running target
| Individual | Viktoriya Rybovalova (UKR) | Galina Avramenko (UKR) | Lilit Mkrtchyan (ARM) |
| Mixed | Galina Avramenko (UKR) | Nourma Try Indriani (INA) | Arusyak Grigoryan (ARM) |
| Junior | Alexandra Saduakassova (KAZ) | Ida Heikkilä (FIN) | Gohar Harutyunyan (ARM) |
| Mixed junior | Alexandra Saduakassova (KAZ) | Ida Heikkilä (FIN) | Anastasiia Zhuchenko (UKR) |

== Medal count ==
* Host nation (France)

| Rank | Nation | Gold | Silver | Bronze | Total |
|---|---|---|---|---|---|
| 1 | Ukraine (UKR) | 6 | 5 | 4 | 15 |
| 2 | Sweden (SWE) | 4 | 2 | 2 | 8 |
| 3 | Kazakhstan (KAZ) | 2 | 0 | 0 | 2 |
| 4 | Finland (FIN) | 1 | 4 | 3 | 8 |
| 5 | Armenia (ARM) | 1 | 0 | 3 | 4 |
| 6 | Hungary (HUN) | 0 | 1 | 1 | 2 |
| 7 | Indonesia (INA) | 0 | 1 | 0 | 1 |
| 7 | South Korea (KOR) | 0 | 1 | 0 | 1 |
| 9 | Poland (POL) | 0 | 0 | 1 | 1 |
| Totals (9 entries) | | 14 | 14 | 14 | 42 |

== Participants ==
A total of 55 shooters from the national teams of the following 14 countries was registered to compete at 2021 World Running Target Championships.

- Armenia (6)
- Czech Republic (1)
- Estonia (2)
- Finland (6)
- France (1)
- Germany (4)
- Indonesia (8)
- Kazakhstan (2)
- Norway (2)
- Poland (1)
- Qatar (3)
- South Korea (3)
- Sweden (4)
- Ukraine (12)
