= 2024 European Running Target Championships =

- Location: Plzeň, Czech Republic
- Dates: 26 August–4 September

The 2024 European Running Target Championships was the 15th edition of the running target competition, European Running Target Championships, that took place from 26 August to 4 September in Plzeň, Czech Republic.

== Results ==
=== Men's ===
Event	Gold	Silver	Bronze
10 m Running Target	Ihor Kizyma; Ukraine	Aaro Juhani Vuorimaa; Finland	Łukasz Czapla; Poland
10 m Running Target Mixed	Aaro Juhani Vuorimaa; Finland	Andreas Bergstroem; Sweden	Denys Babliuk; Ukraine
50 m Running Target	Ihor Kizyma; Ukraine	Aaro Juhani Vuorimaa; Finland	Emil Martinsson; Sweden
50 m Running Target Mixed	Emil Martinsson; Sweden	Łukasz Czapla; Poland	Aaro Juhani Vuorimaa; Finland
Team
10 m Running Target	Ukraine; Ihor Kizyma; Denys Babliuk; Danylo Danilenko	Sweden; Emil Martinsson; Jesper Nyberg; Pontus Thuresson	Hungary; József Sike; László Boros; Tamás Tasi
10 m Running Target Mixed	Ukraine; Denys Babliuk; Ihor Kizyma; Roman Chadai	Sweden; Jesper Nyberg; Emil Martinsson; Pontus Thuresson	Hungary; József Sike; László Boros; Tamás Tasi
50 m Running Target	Sweden; Emil Martinsson; Jesper Nyberg; Andreas Bergstroem	Ukraine; Ihor Kizyma; Denys Babliuk; Danylo Danilenko	Hungary; Tamás Tasi; László Boros; József Sike
50 m Running Target Mixed	Sweden; Emil Martinsson; Jesper Nyberg; Andreas Bergstroem	Ukraine; Ihor Kizyma; Denys Babliuk; Danylo Danilenko	Hungary; József Sike; László Boros; Tamás Tasi

=== Women's ===
Event	Gold	Silver	Bronze
10 m Running Target	Gohar Harutyunyan; Armenia	Viktoriya Rybovalova; Ukraine	Halyna Avramenko; Ukraine
10 m Running Target Mixed	Gohar Harutyunyan; Armenia	Halyna Avramenko; Ukraine	Arusyak Grigoryan; Armenia
50 m Running Target	Valentyna Goncharova; Ukraine	Daniela Vogelbacher; Germany	Halyna Avramenko; Ukraine
50 m Running Target Mixed	Viktoriya Rybovalova; Ukraine	Daniela Vogelbacher; Germany	Marharyta Tarkanii; Ukraine
Team
10 m Running Target	Ukraine; Viktoriya Rybovalova; Halyna Avramenko; Valentyna Goncharova	Armenia; Gohar Harutyunyan; Arusyak Grigoryan; Lilit Mkrtchyan	Ukraine; Anastasiia Zhuchenko; Marharyta Tarkanii; Kristina Hilevych
10 m Running Target Mixed	Armenia; Gohar Harutyunyan; Arusyak Grigoryan; Lilit Mkrtchyan	Ukraine; Marharyta Tarkanii; Anastasiia Zhuchenko; Kristina Hilevych	Ukraine; Halyna Avramenko; Viktoriya Rybovalova; Valentyna Goncharova
50 m Running Target	Ukraine; Valentyna Goncharova; Halyna Avramenko; Viktoriya Rybovalova	Armenia; Gohar Harutyunyan; Arusyak Grigoryan; Lilit Mkrtchyan	Ukraine; Marharyta Tarkanii; Kristina Hilevych; Anastasiia Zhuchenko
50 m Running Target Mixed	Ukraine; Viktoriya Rybovalova; Halyna Avramenko; Valentyna Goncharova	Ukraine; Marharyta Tarkanii; Anastasiia Zhuchenko; Kristina Hilevych	Armenia; Arusyak Grigoryan; Lilit Mkrtchyan; Gohar Harutyunyan

=== Mixed ===
Event	Gold	Silver	Bronze
Mixed
10 m Running Target Mixed Team	Armenia; Gor Khachatryan; Gohar Harutyunyan	Finland; Aaro Juhani Vuorimaa; Ida Heikkilae	Ukraine; Denys Babliuk; Halyna Avramenko

== Medal table ==
* Host nation (Czech Republic)

Rank	Nation	Gold	Silver	Bronze	Total
1	Ukraine	9	6	8	23
2	Armenia	4	2	2	8
3	Sweden	3	3	1	7
4	Finland	1	3	1	5
5	Germany	0	2	0	2
6	Poland	0	1	1	2
7	Hungary	0	0	4	4
Totals (7 entries)		17	17	17	51
