= Denys Babliuk =

Ukrainian sport shooter (born 2001)

Personal information
- Full name: Баблюк Денис Васильович
- Nationality: Ukrainian
- Born: 9 May 2001 (age 25)

Sport
- Country: Ukraine
- Sport: Shooting
- Event: running target
- Club: Armed Forces of Ukraine
- Coached by: Petro Bardetskyi, Ihor Kizyma
Medal record
Men's shooting
Representing Ukraine
Event / 1st / 2nd / 3rd; World Championships / 5 / 1 / 0
World Championships
| Gold medal – first place | 2023 Baku | 10 m running target team |
| Gold medal – first place | 2023 Baku | 10 m running target mixed |
| Gold medal – first place | 2023 Baku | 10 m running target mixed team |
| Gold medal – first place | 2023 Baku | 50 m running target open team |
| Gold medal – first place | 2023 Baku | 50 m running target mixed open team |
| Silver medal – second place | 2022 Châteauroux | 10 metre running target mixed |
European Championships
| Gold medal – first place | 2024 Plzeň | 10 m running target team |
| Gold medal – first place | 2024 Plzeň | 10 m running target mixed team |
| Silver medal – second place | 2024 Plzeň | 50 m running target team |
| Silver medal – second place | 2024 Plzeň | 50 m running target mixed team |
| Silver medal – second place | 2025 Chateauroux | 10 m Running Target Mixed Team |
| Bronze medal – third place | 2024 Plzeň | 10 m running target mixed |
| Bronze medal – third place | 2024 Plzeň | Mixed 10 m running target team |
European Junior Championships
| Gold medal – first place | 2018 Győr | 10 m running target |
| Gold medal – first place | 2020 Wrocław | 10 m running target mixed |
| Bronze medal – third place | 2020 Wrocław | 10 m running target |

Denys Babliuk (Ukrainian: Денис Баблюк; born 9 May 2001 in Khmelnytskyi Oblast, Ukraine) is a Ukrainian male sport shooter. He is the 2022 World Championships silver medalist.

== Career ==
Babliuk's first international success came in 2018 when he became European junior champion in 10m running target. In 2020, he won two European Junior Championships medals: one gold and one bronze. He also competed at the 2018 World Championships in junior competitions but did not manage to win an individual medal.

Babliuk clinched his first senior medal at the 2022 World Championships in French Châteauroux where he finished second behind his teammate Ihor Kizyma in the 10 metre running target mixed competition.
