= Gohar Harutyunyan =

Armenian woman sports shooter

Personal information
- Born: 14 July 2002 (age 24)

Sport
- Country: Armenia
- Sport: Shooting
- Events: 10 metre running target; 10 meter running target mixed; 50 metre running target; 50 meter running target mixed
- Coached by: Edgar Baghdasaryan
Medal record
Women's shooting
Representing Armenia
ISSF World Championships
| Bronze medal – third place | 2022 Châteauroux | 10RT20 Junior |
European Championships
| Silver medal – second place | 2026 Yerevan | 10 m running target |
| Silver medal – second place | 2026 Yerevan | 10 m running target Mixed |
| Silver medal – second place | 2026 Yerevan | 10 m running target Team |
| Silver medal – second place | 2026 Yerevan | 10 m running target Mixed Team |
| Gold medal – first place | 2025 Châteauroux | 10RT20MIX Women's Team |
| Silver medal – second place | 2025 Châteauroux | 10RT20 Women's Team |
| Silver medal – second place | 2025 Châteauroux | 50RT Women's Team |
| Gold medal – first place | 2024 Plzeň | 10RT20 |
| Gold medal – first place | 2024 Plzeň | 10RT20MIX |
| Gold medal – first place | 2024 Plzeň | 10RT20MIX Women's Team |
| Gold medal – first place | 2024 Plzeň | 10RT20MIX Mixed Pairs |
| Silver medal – second place | 2024 Plzeň | 10RT20 Women's Team |
| Silver medal – second place | 2024 Plzeň | 50RT Women's Team |
| Bronze medal – third place | 2024 Plzeň | 50RTMIX Women's Team |
| Gold medal – first place | 2022 Hamar | 10RT20 Junior |
| Gold medal – first place | 2022 Hamar | 10RT20MIX Junior |
| Gold medal – first place | 2022 Hamar | 10RT20MIX Women's Team |
| Bronze medal – third place | 2019 Osijek | 10RT20 Women's Team |
| Bronze medal – third place | 2019 Osijek | 10RT20MIX Women's Team |

Gohar Harutyunyan (Armenian: Գոհար Հարությունյան, sometimes Goar Harutyunyan; born July 14, 2002), is an Armenian woman sports shooter. She competes in the 10metre and 50metre Running Target rifle events. In 2024 she became European Champion in the 10RT20 and 10RT20MIX events.

== Career ==
Gohar Harutyunyan started shooting as a teenager by the advice of her grandfather, Gagik Meloyan, who was her coach until his death in 2019. She continued training under Razmik Minasyan and later under Armenak Galoyan. At her first tournament, the open championship of a children's and youth sports school, she took the third place. At an Armenian Championship, at the age of 13 she became the champion of Armenia. In 2025 her coach was Edgar Baghdasaryan.

In March 2019, at the 2019 European 10 m Events Championships, Harutyunyan won bronze in the 10m Running Target team event with Lilit Mkrtchyan and Arusyak Grigoryan.

In March 2022, at the 2022 European 10 m Events Championships, Gohar won gold medals at the Running target and Running target mixed for junior women. The team Gohar Harutyunyan / Gor Khachatryan won gold at the Running target mixed event.

In August 2022, at the 2022 World Running Target Championships she won bronze at the junior women event.

In August 2024, at the 2024 European Running Target Championships in Plzeň, Czech Republic, Harutyunyan won three gold medals. She won in the women's 10m Running Target. The team of Gohar Harutyunyan / Lilit Mkrtchyan / Arusyak Grigoryan became European champions in the mixed relay. The pair Gor Khachatryan / Gohar Harutyunyan became champions in the mixed running target competition.

In July 2025 at the 2025 European Shooting Championships in Châteauroux, France, she won silver medal at the Women's 50m Moving Target Mixed individual competition, with 380 points. In the team competition for the women's 10m running target mixed event, the team Gohar Harutyunyan / Lilit Mkrtchyan / Arusyak Grigoryan won gold medal with 1103 points. The team Arusyak Grigoryan / Gohar Harutyunyan / Lilit Mkrtchyan won silver in the 10 m Running Target Team event.
