= Vera Perostiyska =

Bulgarian basketball player

Personal information
- Born: May 25, 1982 (age 44) Plovdiv, Bulgaria
- Listed height: 1.96 m (6 ft 5 in)

Career information
- College: FIU
- Playing career: 2000–2017
- Position: Center
- Number: 12

Career history
- 2000-2001: Florida International University
- 2004-2005: Cankaya Universitesi
- 2005-2006: Ceyhan Belediyespor
- 2006-2007: Cankaya Universitesi
- 2007-2008: Good Angels Košice
- 2008-2009: Montana 2003
- 2009: Samsun
- 2009-2010: Neftochimik Burgas
- 2010-2011: Energa Toruń
- 2011-2012: Sony Athinaikos Athens
- 2012: Saint-Amand Hainaut Basket
- 2013: Valosun KP Brno
- 2013: Beroe Stara Zagora
- 2014: Wasserburg
- 2014-2015: Neftochimik Burgas
- 2015-2017: Flying Foxes Vienna

Vera Perostiyska (Bulgarian: Вера Перостийска) (born May 25, 1982) is a former Bulgarian professional basketball player. She is one of the most successful basketball players from Plovdiv, Bulgaria. She has competed in ten different leagues throughout her professional career. Perostiyska was a longtime member of the Bulgarian National team, where she was selected team captain in 2012. She attended Florida International University.
