= Esra Bozabalı =

Turkish sport shooter (born 1991)

Personal information
- Born: 16 August 1991 (age 34) Ankara, Turkey
- Occupation: Turkish Gendarmerie NCO

Sport
- Sport: Shooting
Medal record
Women's sport shooting
Representing Turkey
World Championships
Bronze medal – third place	2025 Cairo	25 meter standard pistol team
European Championships
Gold medal – first place	2025 Osijek	10 m air pistol trio
Bronze medal – third place	2025 Osijek	10 m air pistol team

Esra Bozabalı (born 16 August 1991) is a Turkish sport shooter who competes in the 10m air pistol event. She is a non-commissioned officer at the Turkish Gendarmerie and a member of Jandarma Gücü Sports Club.

== Personal life ==
Esra Bozabalı was born on 16 August 1991. She lives in Ankara, Turkey.

She is a non-commissioned officer of the Turkish Gendarmerie in the rank of Senior sergeant.

== Sport career ==
Bozabalı is a member of Jandarma Gücü Sports Club. She competes in the 10m air pistol event.

She won the gold medal in the 10m air pistol trio event with her teammates Şimal Yılmaz and Şevval İlayda Tarhan at the 2025 European 10 m Events Championships in Osijek, Croatia.
