= Arusyak Grigoryan =

Armenian woman sports shooter

Personal information
- Born: 4 July 2001 (age 24)

Sport
- Country: Armenia
- Sport: Shooting
- Events: 10 metre running target; 10 meter running target mixed; 50 metre running target; 50 meter running target mixed
- Coached by: Edgar Baghdasaryan
Medal record
Women's shooting
Representing Armenia
ISSF World Championships
Bronze medal – third place	2022 Châteauroux	10RT20MIX
European Championships
Silver medal – second place	2026 Yerevan	10 m running target Team
Silver medal – second place	2026 Yerevan	10 m running target Mixed Team
Gold medal – first place	2025 Châteauroux	10RT20MIX Women's Team
Silver medal – second place	2025 Châteauroux	10RT20 Women's Team
Silver medal – second place	2025 Châteauroux	50RT Women's Team
Bronze medal – third place	2025 Châteauroux	10RT20
Gold medal – first place	2024 Plzeň	10RT20MIX Women's Team
Silver medal – second place	2024 Plzeň	10RT20 Women's Team
Silver medal – second place	2024 Plzeň	50RT Women's Team
Bronze medal – third place	2024 Plzeň	10RT20MIX
Bronze medal – third place	2024 Plzeň	50RTMIX Women's Team
Silver medal – second place	2022 Hamar	10RT20
Silver medal – second place	2022 Hamar	10RT20MIX

Arusyak Grigoryan or Arusiak Grigorian (Armenian: Արուսյակ Գրիգորյան, born 04.07.2001) is an Armenian woman sport shooter. She specialises in the ISSF Running Target disciplines. She won two silver medals at the 2022 European Championships and a bronze medal at the 2022 ISSF World Championships.

At the 2024 European Running Target Championships, she won an individual bronze and four team medals with teammates Lilit Mkrtchyan and Gohar Harutyunyan.

In 2025 she won individual bronze and three team medals at the European Championships.
