= Shooting at the 2023 European Games – Women's team 10 metre air pistol =

Women's team 10 metre air pistol at the 2023 European Games
- Venue: Wrocław Shooting Centre
- Dates: 24 June
- Competitors: 27 from 9 nations
- Teams: 9

Medalists
gold medal	Josefin Eder; Sandra Reitz; Doreen Vennekamp	Germany
silver medal	Céline Goberville; Camille Jedrzejewski; Mathilde Lamolle	France
bronze medal	Sara Costantino; Chiara Giancamilli; Maria Varricchio	Italy

The women's team 10 metre air pistol event at the 2023 European Games took place on 24 June at the Wrocław Shooting Centre.

== Records ==
Prior to this competition, the existing world, European and Games records were as follows.

Qualification
World Record	—	—	—	—
European Record	Turkey; Elif Beyza Aşık; Şevval İlayda Tarhan; Seher Tokmak	861	Hamar, Norway	27 March 2022
Games Record	—	—	—	—

== Results ==
=== Qualification 1 ===
Rank	Country	Athlete	Series			Total	Team total	Notes
Rank	Country	Athlete	1	2	3	Total	Team total	Notes
1	Germany	Doreen Vennekamp	95	98	97	290-11x	864-30x	Q, ER, GR
1	Germany	Josefin Eder	93	97	98	288-9x	864-30x	Q, ER, GR
1	Germany	Sandra Reitz	95	95	96	286-10x	864-30x	Q, ER, GR
2	Italy	Sara Costantino	95	97	94	286-7x	855-20x	Q
2	Italy	Maria Varricchio	96	96	93	285-5x	855-20x	Q
2	Italy	Chiara Giancamilli	97	94	93	284-8x	855-20x	Q
3	Hungary	Veronika Major	96	95	100	291-11x	855-18x	Q
3	Hungary	Miriam Jákó	95	95	95	285-4x	855-18x	Q
3	Hungary	Renáta Sike	95	92	92	279-3x	855-18x	Q
4	France	Céline Goberville	98	97	95	290-10x	853-25x	Q
4	France	Camille Jedrzejewski	94	97	95	286-10x	853-25x	Q
4	France	Mathilde Lamolle	92	91	94	277-5x	853-25x	Q
5	Poland	Klaudia Breś	99	97	94	290-8x	853-17x	Q
5	Poland	Julita Borek	93	97	94	284-5x	853-17x	Q
5	Poland	Joanna Wawrzonowska	91	93	95	279-4x	853-17x	Q
6	Georgia	Mariami Prodiashvili	97	94	94	285-6x	851-20x	Q
6	Georgia	Nino Salukvadze	95	95	94	284-9x	851-20x	Q
6	Georgia	Lizi Kiladze	91	96	95	282-5x	851-20x	Q
7	Spain	Irlanda Mira-Perceval	96	99	95	290-12x	848-25x	Q
7	Spain	Sonia Franquet	93	96	94	283-9x	848-25x	Q
7	Spain	María Soto	91	91	93	275-4x	848-25x	Q
8	Czech Republic	Veronika Schejbalová	95	97	94	286-6x	844-16x	Q
8	Czech Republic	Anna Miřejovská	92	92	97	281-7x	844-16x	Q
8	Czech Republic	Alžběta Dědová	90	96	91	277-3x	844-16x	Q
9	Azerbaijan	Nazrin Abbasli	95	91	92	278-8x	826-16x	
9	Azerbaijan	Nigar Nasirova	91	93	93	277-4x	826-16x	
9	Azerbaijan	Narmina Samadova	93	90	88	271-4x	826-16x	

=== Qualification 2 ===
Rank	Country	Athlete	Series		Total	Team total	Notes
Rank	Country	Athlete	1	2	Total	Team total	Notes
1	Germany	Doreen Vennekamp	96	98	194-6x	575-17x	QG
1	Germany	Josefin Eder	97	95	192-5x	575-17x	QG
1	Germany	Sandra Reitz	91	98	189-6x	575-17x	QG
2	France	Camille Jedrzejewski	96	99	195-8x	573-19x	QG
2	France	Céline Goberville	97	94	191-7x	573-19x	QG
2	France	Mathilde Lamolle	92	95	187-4x	573-19x	QG
3	Poland	Klaudia Breś	98	95	193-7x	571-18x	QB
3	Poland	Joanna Wawrzonowska	94	96	190-7x	571-18x	QB
3	Poland	Julita Borek	93	95	188-4x	571-18x	QB
4	Italy	Maria Varricchio	94	96	190-7x	570-15x	QB
4	Italy	Sara Costantino	94	96	190-4x	570-15x	QB
4	Italy	Chiara Giancamilli	94	96	190-4x	570-15x	QB
5	Hungary	Veronika Major	98	92	190-2x	564-9x	
5	Hungary	Renáta Sike	95	93	188-5x	564-9x	
5	Hungary	Miriam Jákó	93	93	186-2x	564-9x	
6	Czech Republic	Veronika Schejbalová	96	95	191-6x	563-12x	
6	Czech Republic	Anna Miřejovská	93	95	188-3x	563-12x	
6	Czech Republic	Alžběta Dědová	91	93	184-3x	563-12x	
7	Georgia	Mariami Prodiashvili	97	95	192-5x	561-11x	
7	Georgia	Lizi Kiladze	93	93	186-4x	561-11x	
7	Georgia	Nino Salukvadze	91	92	183-2x	561-11x	
8	Spain	Irlanda Mira-Perceval	94	94	188-4x	560-12x	
8	Spain	Sonia Franquet	95	93	188-4x	560-12x	
8	Spain	María Soto	91	93	184-4x	560-12x	

=== Finals ===
Rank	Country	Athletes	Total
Gold medal match
1st place, gold medalist(s)	Germany	Josefin Eder; Sandra Reitz; Doreen Vennekamp	16
2nd place, silver medalist(s)	France	Céline Goberville; Camille Jedrzejewski; Mathilde Lamolle	8
Bronze medal match
3rd place, bronze medalist(s)	Italy	Sara Costantino; Chiara Giancamilli; Maria Varricchio	16
4	Poland	Julita Borek; Klaudia Breś; Joanna Wawrzonowska	12
