= Valentyna Honcharova =

Ukrainian female sports shooter

Personal information
- Nationality: Ukrainian
- Born: 17 September 1990 (age 35)

Sport
- Sport: Shooting
- Events: 10 m Running Target; 50 m Running Target
Medal record
World Championships
Gold medal – first place	2023 Baku	10 m team running target
Silver medal – second place	2018 Changwon	10 m team running target mixed
Bronze medal – third place	2023 Baku	10 m running target mixed
Junior World Championships
Gold medal – first place	2009 Heinola	10 m running target junior
Gold medal – first place	2010 Munich	10 m running target junior
Gold medal – first place	2010 Munich	10 m running target mixed junior
Silver medal – second place	2009 Heinola	10 m running target mixed junior
Bronze medal – third place	2008 Plzen	10 m running target junior
Bronze medal – third place	2008 Plzen	10 m running target mixed junior
European Championships
Gold medal – first place	2025 Châteauroux	10 m team running target
Gold medal – first place	2024 Plzeň	50 m running target
Gold medal – first place	2024 Plzeň	10 m team running target
Gold medal – first place	2024 Plzeň	50 m team running target
Gold medal – first place	2024 Plzeň	50 m team running target mixed
Bronze medal – third place	2025 Châteauroux	10 m team running target mixed

Valentyna Honcharova (born September 17th, 1990; Ukrainian: Валентина Гончарова) is a Ukrainian female sports shooter. In 2024 she set the women's world record for 50 m Running Target with a score of 573.

== Career ==
Honcharova participated at the 2018 ISSF World Shooting Championships, winning a silver medal in the 10 m mixed team event.

At the 2023 ISSF World Shooting Championships, Honcharova won individual bronze in the 10 m running target mixed, and team gold with Halyna Avramenko and Viktoriya Rybovalova.

At the 2024 European Running Target Championships she won gold in the women's 50 m Running Target, setting a new world record of 573.

At the 2025 European Shooting Championships, Honcharova won team gold in the women's 10m running target, and team bronze in the 10m running target mixed events.
