= 2026 European 10 m Events Championships =

Shooting tournament held in Croatia

- Venue: Karen Demirchyan Complex
- Location: Yerevan, Armenia
- Dates: 27 February –5 March
- Competitors: 354 from 4- nations

The 2026 European 10 m Events Championships was held from 27 February to 5 March 2026 in Yerevan, Armenia.

== Medalists ==
=== Seniors ===
| Event | Gold | | Silver | | Bronze | |
Men
| Air Pistol Men | Anton Aristarkhov; Individual Neutral Athletes | 242.2 | Robin Walter; Germany | 241.4 | Jason Solari; Switzerland | 219.3 |
| Air Rifle Men | Danilo Sollazzo; Italy | 252.8 | Victor Lindgren; Sweden | 252.4 | Ole Martin Halvorsen; Norway | 230.1 |
| Moving Target Men | Jesper Nyberg; Sweden | 7^{G} | Łukasz Czapla; Poland | 5^{G} | Aaro Juhani Vuorimaa; Finland | 6^{B} |
| Moving Target Mixed Men | Łukasz Czapla; Poland | 383- 7x | Danylo Danilenko; Ukraine | 379- 8x | Aaro Juhani Vuorimaa; Finland | 376- 8x |
| Team Air Pistol Men | Italy; Paolo Monna; Federico Nilo Maldini; Mattia Scodes | 1737-61x | Turkey; İsmail Keleş; Yusuf Dikeç; Buğra Selimzade | 1729-46x | Serbia; Damir Mikec; Uroš Gajić; Mateja Tripković | 1719-46x |
| Team Air Rifle Men | Norway; Jon-Hermann Hegg; Ole Martin Halvorsen; Henrik Larsen | 1895.4 ER | Sweden; Victor Lindgren; Marcus Madsen; Erik Sahlin | 1893.9 | Croatia; Miran Maričić; Josip Sikavica; Petar Gorša | 1892.9 |
| Team Moving Target Men | Finland; Aaro Juhani Vuorimaa; Henri Karlsson; Matias Pasanen | 1678-32x | Sweden; Jesper Nyberg; Emil Martinsson; Mats Eliasson | 1678-27x | not awarded | |
| Team Moving Target Mixed Men | Armenia; Hovhannes Margaryan; Hayk Minasyan; Gor Khachatryan | 1108-21x | Sweden; Emil Martinsson; Jesper Nyberg; Mats Eliasson | 1099-13x | Finland; Aaro Juhani Vuorimaa; Henri Karlsson; Matias Pasanen | 1090-23x |
Women
| Air Pistol Women | Veronika Major; Hungary | 238.8 | Manja Slak; Slovenia | 238.2 | Antoaneta Kostadinova; Bulgaria | 215.0 |
| Air Rifle Women | Pernille Nor-Woll; Norway | 253.7 ER ERJ | Anna Janssen; Germany | 253.4 | Elif Duygu Eren; Turkey | 230.6 |
| Moving Target Women | Lilit Mkrtchyan; Armenia | 8^{G} | Gohar Harutyunyan; Armenia | 6^{G} | Marharyta Tarkanii; Ukraine | 6^{6} |
| Moving Target Mixed Women | Viktoriya Rybovalova; Ukraine | 371-8x | Gohar Harutyunyan; Armenia | 370-7x | Marharyta Tarkanii; Ukraine | 368-9x S-off: 19 |
| Team Air Pistol Women | Hungary; Veronika Major; Sára Ráhel Fábián; Miriam Jákó | 1712-51x | Georgia; Mariami Marshava; Mariam Abramishvili; Mariami Prodiashvili | 1710-43x | Bulgaria; Antoaneta Kostadinova; Miroslava Mincheva; Adiel Ilieva | 1710-37x |
| Team Air Rifle Women | Norway; Jeanette Hegg Duestad; Pernille Nor-Woll; Synnøve Berg | 1897.3 ER | Turkey; Elif Duygu Eren; Damla Köse; Elif Berfin Altun | 1895.5 | Serbia; Anđelija Stevanović; Ljiljana Cvetković; Aleksandra Havran | 1895.2 |
| Team Moving Target Women | Ukraine; Viktoriya Rybovalova; Marharyta Tarkanii; Halyna Avramenko | 1661-30x | Armenia; Gohar Harutyunyan; Lilit Mkrtchyan; Arusyak Grigoryan | 1649-32x | Germany; Daniela Vogelbacher; Nicola Inge Mueller-Fassbender; Eva Maria Östreicher | 1559-25x |
| Team Moving Target Mixed Women | Ukraine; Viktoriya Rybovalova; Marharyta Tarkanii; Halyna Avramenko | 1107-23x | Armenia; Gohar Harutyunyan; Lilit Mkrtchyan; Arusyak Grigoryan | 1099-18x | Germany; Nicola Inge Mueller-Fassbender; Daniela Vogelbacher; Eva Maria Östreicher | 1021-12x |
Mixed
| Air Pistol Mix | Hungary; Veronika Major; Ákos Károly Nagy | 479.1 ER | Turkey; Şevval İlayda Tarhan; Yusuf Dikeç | 475.6 | Individual Neutral Athletes; Liubov Yaskevich; Ivan Kazak | 412.8 |
| Air Rifle Mix | Norway; Jeanette Hegg Duestad; Jon-Hermann Hegg | 506.7 WR | Germany; Anna Janssen; Maximilian Ulbrich | 504.4 | Sweden; Amanda Karlsson; Victor Lindgren | 437.8 |
| Moving Target Mix | Ukraine; Danylo Danilenko; Viktoriya Rybovalova | 6^{G} | Armenia; Hayk Minasyan; Lilit Mkrtchyan | 3^{G} | Finland; Aaro Juhani Vuorimaa; Ida Julianna Heikkilae | 7^{B} |

=== Juniors ===
| Event | Gold | | Silver | | Bronze | |
|---|---|---|---|---|---|---|
| Moving Target Junior Men | William Erik Wilkman; Finland | 6^{G} | Dmytro Kravets; Ukraine | 4^{G} | Roman Berezitskyi; Ukraine | 6^{B} |
| Moving Target Mixed Junior Men | Roman Berezitskyi; Ukraine | 373-7x | William Erik Wilkman; Finland | 363-5x | Dmytro Kravets; Ukraine | 353-5x |
| Moving Target Junior Women | Lilit Mkrtchyan; Armenia | 6^{G} | Anahit Sargsyan; Armenia | 2^{G} | Alina Tkalyk; Ukraine | 8^{B} |
| Moving Target Mixed Junior Women | Lilit Mkrtchyan; Armenia | 366-6x | Yana Hakobyan; Armenia | 362-5x | Alina Tkalyk; Ukraine | 355-5x S-off: 19 |
