= 2022 European 10 m Events Championships =

International sport shooting competition

2022 European Championships
- Location: Hamar, Norway
- Dates: 18–27 March

The 2022 10m European Shooting Championships was held from 18 to 27 March 2022 in Hamar, Norway.

== Medals ==
=== Seniors and Juniors (20-27 March) ===
Rank	Nation	Gold	Silver	Bronze	Total
1	Armenia	7	3	0	10
2	Germany	5	1	2	8
3	Italy	4	3	3	10
4	Hungary	3	1	6	10
5	Serbia	2	4	3	9
6	Sweden	2	4	1	7
7	Norway	1	3	4	8
8	Slovakia	1	1	0	2
9	Czech Republic	1	0	1	2
10	Israel	1	0	0	1
10	Poland	1	0	0	1
10	Ukraine	1	0	0	1
13	Turkey	0	3	0	3
14	Finland	0	2	2	4
15	France	0	1	2	3
16	Austria	0	1	1	2
16	Latvia	0	1	1	2
18	Bulgaria	0	1	0	1
19	Croatia	0	0	2	2
19	Estonia	0	0	2	2
21	Belgium	0	0	1	1
21	Moldova	0	0	1	1
21	Switzerland	0	0	1	1
Totals (23 entries)		29	29	33	91

=== Para Events (15-18 March) ===
https://www.em2022.no/medaljeoversikter/

Rank	Nation	Gold	Silver	Bronze	Total
1	Poland	3	6	3	12
2	Slovakia	3	1	0	4
3	Serbia	3	0	1	4
4	France	2	1	3	6
5	Spain	2	1	0	3
6	Great Britain	1	4	0	5
7	Turkey	1	2	4	7
8	Croatia	1	1	0	2
8	Czech Republic	1	1	0	2
10	North Macedonia	1	0	1	2
11	Israel	1	0	0	1
12	Denmark	0	1	0	1
12	Finland	0	1	0	1
14	Sweden	0	0	2	2
15	Hungary	0	0	1	1
15	Norway	0	0	1	1
Totals (16 entries)		19	19	16	54

== Participating issue ==
Because of Russian invasion of Ukraine, Russia and Belarus were banned, and Ukrainian athletes could not attend due to the war in their country.

== Results ==
=== Seniors ===
==== Men ====
Event	Gold	Silver	Bronze
Rifle	Patrik Jány; Slovakia	Henrik Larsen; Norway	Miran Maričić; Croatia
Rifle team	Czech Republic; Ales Entrichel; Jiří Přívratský; Frantisek Smetana	Austria; Patrick Diem; Martin Strempfl; Andreas Thum	Croatia; Petar Gorša; Miran Maričić; Borna Petanjek
Pistol	Robin Walter; Germany	Juraj Tužinský; Slovakia	Miklós Tátrai; Hungary
Pistol team	Italy; Paolo Monna; Luca Tesconi; Alessio Torracchi	Latvia; Gvido Cvetkovs; Lauris Strautmanis; Emils Vasermanis	Germany; Paul Fröhlich; David Probst; Robin Walter
Running target	Emil Martinsson; Sweden	Jesper Nyberg; Sweden	József Sike; Hungary
Running target mixed	Emil Martinsson; Sweden	Jesper Nyberg; Sweden	Bedřich Jonáš; Czech Republic

==== Women ====
Event	Gold	Silver	Bronze
Rifle	Teodora Vukojević; Serbia	Océanne Muller; France	Jessie Kaps; Belgium
Rifle team	Poland; Natalia Kochanska; Julia Ewa Piotrowska; Aneta Stankiewicz	Norway; Jeanette Hegg Duestad; Katrine Lund; Milda Marina Haugen	France; Julia Canestrelli; Romane Matte; Océanne Muller
Pistol	Olena Kostevych; Ukraine	Zorana Arunović; Serbia	Sylvia Steiner; Austria
Pistol team	Serbia; Zorana Arunović; Jasmina Milovanović; Brankica Zarić	Italy; Sara Costantino; Chiara Giancamilli; Maria Varricchio	France; Céline Goberville; Camille Jedrzejewski; Mathilde Lamolle
Running target	Lilit Mkrtchyan; Armenia	Arusyak Grigoryan; Armenia	Heili Lepp; Estonia
Running target mixed	Lilit Mkrtchyan; Armenia	Arusyak Grigoryan; Armenia	Heili Lepp; Estonia

==== Mixed events ====
Event	Gold	Silver	Bronze
Rifle	Israel; Tal Engler; Sergey Richter	Serbia; Andrea Arsović; Lazar Kovačević	Switzerland; Chiara Leone; Jan Lochbihler
Rifle	Israel; Tal Engler; Sergey Richter	Serbia; Andrea Arsović; Lazar Kovačević	Italy; Martina Ziviani; Riccardo Armiraglio
Pistol	Germany; Sandra Reitz; Robin Walter	Bulgaria; Antoaneta Kostadinova; Kiril Kirov	Italy; Sara Costantino; Paolo Monna
Pistol	Germany; Sandra Reitz; Robin Walter	Bulgaria; Antoaneta Kostadinova; Kiril Kirov	Serbia; Zorana Arunović; Damir Mikec
Running target mixed	Armenia; Gohar Harutyunyan; Gor Khachatryan	Armenia; Hovhannes Margaryan; Lilit Mkrtchyan	Norway; Even Nordsveen; Anneline Tangen

=== Juniors ===
==== Men ====
Event	Gold	Silver	Bronze
Rifle	Danilo Sollazzo; Italy	Marko Ivanović; Serbia	Petar Erdei; Serbia
Rifle team	Germany; Tom Barbe; Nils Palberg; Simon Bauer	Italy; Danilo Sollazzo; Michele Bernardi; Luca Sbarbati	Hungary; Dávid Zoltán Csendes; Marton Istvan Klenczner; Kalman Balint
Pistol	Mattis Hembre; Norway	Eduard Baumeister; Germany	Daniels Vilciņš; Latvia
Pistol team	Italy; Mattia Scodes; Luca Arrighi; Matteo Mastrovalerio	Turkey; Emin Kubilay Özer; Alp Eren Erdur; Mert İbrahim Özel	Norway; Mattis Hembre; Tobias Skaarstad; Erik Eknes
Running target	Gor Khachatryan; Armenia	Mats Per Oscar Eliasson; Sweden	Aaro Juhani Vuorimaa; Finland
Running target mixed	Gor Khachatryan; Armenia	Mats Per Oscar Eliasson; Sweden	Aaro Juhani Vuorimaa; Finland

==== Women ====
Event	Gold	Silver	Bronze
Rifle	Gitta Bajos; Hungary	Pernille Nor-Woll; Norway	Anna Nagybanyai-Nagy; Hungary
Rifle team	Hungary; Anna Nagybanyai-Nagy; Anna Tóth; Gitta Bajos	Serbia; Alexsandra Havran; Anja Knežević; Anja Popović	Germany; Franziska Driessen; Franka Janssen; Michelle Blos
Pistol	Miriam Jako; Hungary	Şimal Yılmaz; Turkey	Anna Dulce; Moldova
Pistol team	Germany; Vanessa Seeger; Celina Becker; Jette Sophie Lippert	Italy; Alessandra Fait; Francesca Cardiero; Giada Giannachi	Hungary; Miriam Jako; Tuende Szakacs; Babett Varga-Zalay
Running target	Gohar Harutyunyan; Armenia	Aino Amanda Vaittinen; Finland	Emilie Sorlie; Norway
Running target mixed	Gohar Harutyunyan; Armenia	Aino Amanda Vaittinen; Finland	Emilie Sorlie; Norway

==== Mixed events ====
Event	Gold	Silver	Bronze
Rifle	Italy; Sofia Ceccarello; Danilo Sollazzo	Hungary; Gitta Bajos; Dávid Zoltán Csendes	Serbia; Alexsandra Havran; Marko Ivanović
Rifle	Italy; Sofia Ceccarello; Danilo Sollazzo	Hungary; Gitta Bajos; Dávid Zoltán Csendes	Sweden; Amanda Josefine Karlsson; Victor Lindgren
Pistol	Germany; Vanessa Seeger; Eduard Baumeister	Turkey; Şimal Yılmaz; Alp Eren Erdur	Italy; Alessandra Fait; Matteo Mastrovalerio
Pistol	Germany; Vanessa Seeger; Eduard Baumeister	Turkey; Şimal Yılmaz; Alp Eren Erdur	Hungary; Miriam Jako; Bálint Nagy
