= Ihor Kizyma =

Ukrainian sport shooter (born 1997)

Personal information
- Full name: Ihor Kizyma
- Nationality: Ukrainian
- Born: 31 March 1997 (age 29) Lviv, Ukraine

Sport
- Country: Ukraine
- Sport: Shooting
- Event: running target
Medal record
Men's shooting
Representing Ukraine
Event	1st	2nd	3rd
World Championships	7	3	1
European Championships	4	3	1
World Championships
Gold medal – first place	2022 Châteauroux	50 m running target
Gold medal – first place	2022 Châteauroux	10 m running target mixed
Gold medal – first place	2023 Baku	10 m running target
Gold medal – first place	2023 Baku	10 m running target team
Gold medal – first place	2023 Baku	10 m running target mixed team
Gold medal – first place	2023 Baku	50 m running target open team
Gold medal – first place	2023 Baku	50 m running target mixed open team
Silver medal – second place	2022 Châteauroux	10 m running target
Silver medal – second place	2023 Baku	10 m running target mixed
Silver medal – second place	2023 Baku	50 m running target open
Bronze medal – third place	2022 Châteauroux	50 m running target mixed
European Championships
Gold medal – first place	2024 Plzeň	10 m running target
Gold medal – first place	2024 Plzeň	50 m running target
Gold medal – first place	2024 Plzeň	10 m running target team
Gold medal – first place	2024 Plzeň	10 m running target mixed team
Silver medal – second place	2019 Osijek	Mixed team
Silver medal – second place	2024 Plzeň	50 m running target team
Silver medal – second place	2024 Plzeň	50 m running target mixed team
Bronze medal – third place	2019 Osijek	10 m running target
World Junior Championships
Gold medal – first place	2016 Suhl	50 m running target
Gold medal – first place	2016 Suhl	50 m running target mixed
Bronze medal – third place	2016 Suhl	10 m running target
European Junior Championships
Gold medal – first place	2013 Suhl	50 m running target
Gold medal – first place	2013 Suhl	50 m running target mixed
Gold medal – first place	2016 Győr	10 m running target
Gold medal – first place	2017 Maribor	1 0m running target
Gold medal – first place	2017 Maribor	10 m running target mixed
Gold medal – first place	2017 Baku	50 m running target
Gold medal – first place	2017 Baku	50m running target mixed
Silver medal – second place	2015 Maribor	50 m running target
Silver medal – second place	2015 Maribor	50 m running target mixed
Silver medal – second place	2015 Arnhem	10 m running target mixed
Silver medal – second place	2016 Győr	10 m running target mixed
Bronze medal – third place	2015 Arnhem	10 m running target

Ihor Kizyma (Ukrainian: Ігор Кізима; born 31 March 1997 in Lviv, Ukraine) is a Ukrainian sport shooter. He is the 2022 World Champion and 2019 European silver and bronze medallist.

== Career ==
Kizyma came into the sport at the age of 9. His first coach was Volodymyr Yurchenko. He became a two-time World junior champion in 2016 in Suhl, Germany. He is also multiple World and European junior champion and medallist.

At the 2019 European championships in Osijek, Croatia, he won a silver and a bronze medal for the first time in his career at the senior level.

Kizyma won his first World title at the 2022 World Championships in French Châteauroux where he won the 50 metre running target competition.

== Personal life ==
Kizyma studied at the Lviv Sports Professional College. He serves in the Armed Forces of Ukraine and is junior sergeant.
