= 2025 European 10 m Events Championships =

Shooting tournament held in Croatia

- Venue: Gradski vrt Hall
- Location: Osijek, Croatia
- Dates: 7–13 March
- Competitors: 325 from 42 nations

The 2025 European 10 m Events Championships was held from 7 March to 13 March 2025 in Osijek, Croatia.

== Medal table (total) ==
ISSF events (20): 10 Senior + 10 Junior

ESC Challenge events (16): 8 Senior + 8 Junior

* Host nation (Croatia)

| Rank | Nation | Gold | Silver | Bronze | Total |
|---|---|---|---|---|---|
| 1 | Turkey | 7 | 4 | 2 | 13 |
| 2 | Norway | 5 | 0 | 3 | 8 |
| 3 | Georgia | 4 | 0 | 1 | 5 |
| 4 | Individual Neutral Athletes | 3 | 3 | 0 | 6 |
| 5 | Italy | 3 | 1 | 1 | 5 |
| 6 | Germany | 2 | 4 | 1 | 7 |
| 7 | Czech Republic | 2 | 4 | 0 | 6 |
| 8 | France | 2 | 0 | 0 | 2 |
| 9 | Ukraine | 1 | 5 | 4 | 10 |
| 10 | Serbia | 1 | 3 | 5 | 9 |
| 11 | Hungary | 1 | 3 | 2 | 6 |
| 12 | Switzerland | 1 | 3 | 1 | 5 |
| 13 | Romania | 1 | 1 | 4 | 6 |
| 14 | Croatia* | 1 | 1 | 3 | 5 |
| 15 | Sweden | 1 | 0 | 1 | 2 |
| 16 | Slovakia | 1 | 0 | 0 | 1 |
| 17 | Austria | 0 | 1 | 3 | 4 |
| 18 | Poland | 0 | 1 | 2 | 3 |
| 19 | Bulgaria | 0 | 1 | 1 | 2 |
| 20 | Armenia | 0 | 1 | 0 | 1 |
| 21 | Azerbaijan | 0 | 0 | 1 | 1 |
| 21 | Latvia | 0 | 0 | 1 | 1 |
| Totals (22 entries) | | 36 | 36 | 36 | 108 |

== Medal table (senior) ==
=== Total ===
* Host nation (Croatia)

| Rank | Nation | Gold | Silver | Bronze | Total |
|---|---|---|---|---|---|
| 1 | Turkey | 4 | 2 | 2 | 8 |
| 2 | Norway | 4 | 0 | 1 | 5 |
| 3 | Czech Republic | 2 | 4 | 0 | 6 |
| 4 | Individual Neutral Athletes | 2 | 1 | 0 | 3 |
| 5 | Hungary | 1 | 2 | 1 | 4 |
| 5 | Switzerland | 1 | 2 | 1 | 4 |
| 7 | Romania | 1 | 0 | 2 | 3 |
| 7 | Ukraine | 1 | 0 | 2 | 3 |
| 9 | France | 1 | 0 | 0 | 1 |
| 9 | Slovakia | 1 | 0 | 0 | 1 |
| 11 | Serbia | 0 | 2 | 2 | 4 |
| 12 | Bulgaria | 0 | 1 | 1 | 2 |
| 12 | Croatia* | 0 | 1 | 1 | 2 |
| 14 | Armenia | 0 | 1 | 0 | 1 |
| 14 | Germany | 0 | 1 | 0 | 1 |
| 14 | Italy | 0 | 1 | 0 | 1 |
| 17 | Austria | 0 | 0 | 2 | 2 |
| 18 | Azerbaijan | 0 | 0 | 1 | 1 |
| 18 | Poland | 0 | 0 | 1 | 1 |
| 18 | Sweden | 0 | 0 | 1 | 1 |
| Totals (20 entries) | | 18 | 18 | 18 | 54 |

=== ISSF events ===
* Host nation (Croatia)

| Rank | Nation | Gold | Silver | Bronze | Total |
|---|---|---|---|---|---|
| 1 | Czech Republic | 2 | 2 | 0 | 4 |
| 2 | Turkey | 2 | 0 | 1 | 3 |
| 3 | Switzerland | 1 | 1 | 1 | 3 |
| 4 | Norway | 1 | 0 | 1 | 2 |
| 4 | Romania | 1 | 0 | 1 | 2 |
| 4 | Ukraine | 1 | 0 | 1 | 2 |
| 7 | France | 1 | 0 | 0 | 1 |
| 7 | Slovakia | 1 | 0 | 0 | 1 |
| 9 | Serbia | 0 | 2 | 2 | 4 |
| 10 | Bulgaria | 0 | 1 | 1 | 2 |
| 10 | Croatia* | 0 | 1 | 1 | 2 |
| 12 | Hungary | 0 | 1 | 0 | 1 |
| 12 | Individual Neutral Athletes | 0 | 1 | 0 | 1 |
| 12 | Italy | 0 | 1 | 0 | 1 |
| 15 | Austria | 0 | 0 | 1 | 1 |
| Totals (15 entries) | | 10 | 10 | 10 | 30 |

=== ESC Challenge events ===
* Host nation (Croatia)

| Rank | Nation | Gold | Silver | Bronze | Total |
|---|---|---|---|---|---|
| 1 | Norway | 3 | 0 | 0 | 3 |
| 2 | Turkey | 2 | 2 | 1 | 5 |
| 3 | Individual Neutral Athletes | 2 | 0 | 0 | 2 |
| 4 | Hungary | 1 | 1 | 1 | 3 |
| 5 | Czech Republic | 0 | 2 | 0 | 2 |
| 6 | Armenia | 0 | 1 | 0 | 1 |
| 6 | Germany | 0 | 1 | 0 | 1 |
| 6 | Switzerland | 0 | 1 | 0 | 1 |
| 9 | Austria | 0 | 0 | 1 | 1 |
| 9 | Azerbaijan | 0 | 0 | 1 | 1 |
| 9 | Poland | 0 | 0 | 1 | 1 |
| 9 | Romania | 0 | 0 | 1 | 1 |
| 9 | Sweden | 0 | 0 | 1 | 1 |
| 9 | Ukraine | 0 | 0 | 1 | 1 |
| Totals (14 entries) | | 8 | 8 | 8 | 24 |

== Medalists ==
=== ISSF Events ===
| Event | Gold | Silver | Bronze |
Men
| Air Pistol Men | Juraj Tužinský; Slovakia | Pavel Schejbal; Czech Republic | Jason Solari; Switzerland |
| Air Rifle Men | Serhiy Kulish; Ukraine | Ilia Marsov; Individual Neutral Athletes | Miran Maričić; Croatia |
| Team Air Pistol Men | Czech Republic; Pavel Schejbal; Jindřich Dubový; Pavel Světlík | Italy; Federico Nilo Maldini; Paolo Monna; Matteo Mastrovalerio | Ukraine; Viktor Bankin; Oleh Omelchuk; Pavlo Korostylov |
| Team Air Rifle Men | Czech Republic; Filip Nepejchal; Aleš Entrichel; Jiří Přívratský | Croatia; Petar Gorša; Miran Maričić; Josip Sikavica | Austria; Patrick Diem; Martin Strempfl; Thomas Mathis |
Women
| Air Pistol Women | Şevval İlayda Tarhan; Turkey | Zorana Arunović; Serbia | Miroslava Mincheva; Bulgaria |
| Air Rifle Women | Laura Ilie; Romania | Audrey Gogniat; Switzerland | Aleksandra Havran; Serbia |
| Team Air Pistol Women | France; Camille Jedrzejewski; Céline Goberville; Annabelle Pioch | Bulgaria; Miroslava Mincheva; Antoaneta Kostadinova; Adiel Ilieva | Turkey; Şevval İlayda Tarhan; Şimal Yılmaz; Esra Bozabalı |
| Team Air Rifle Women | Norway; Jeanette Hegg Duestad; Mari Bårdseng Løvseth; Amalie Evensen | Hungary; Eszter Dénes; Eszter Mészáros; Gitta Bajos | Romania; Laura Ilie; Roxana Sidi; Adriana Roberta Teodorescu |
Mixed
| Air Pistol Mix | Turkey; Şevval İlayda Tarhan; Yusuf Dikeç | Czech Republic; Viktorie Šindlerová; Pavel Schejbal | Serbia; Zorana Arunović; Damir Mikec |
| Air Rifle Mix | Switzerland; Audrey Gogniat; Jan Lochbihler | Serbia; Aleksandra Havran; Aleksa Rakonjac | Norway; Jeanette Hegg Duestad; Jon-Hermann Hegg |

=== ESC Challenge events ===
| Event | Gold | Silver | Bronze |
Men
| Air Pistol Solo Men | Anton Aristarkhov; Individual Neutral Athletes | Yusuf Dikeç; Turkey | Luca Joldea; Romania |
| Air Rifle Solo Men | Zalán Pekler; Hungary | István Péni; Hungary | Victor Lindgren; Sweden |
| Air Pistol Trio Men | Turkey; Yusuf Dikeç; İsmail Keleş; Buğra Selimzade | Czech Republic; Jindřich Dubový; Pavel Schejbal; Pavel Světlík | Azerbaijan; Elvin Astanov; Vladislav Kalmikov; Ruslan Lunev |
| Air Rifle Trio Men | Norway; Ole Martin Halvorsen; Jon-Hermann Hegg; Henrik Larsen | Czech Republic; Aleš Entrichel; Filip Nepejchal; Jiří Přívratský | Hungary; Soma Richard Hammerl; Zalán Pekler; István Péni |
Women
| Air Pistol Solo Women | Liubov Yaskevich; Individual Neutral Athletes | Elmira Karapetyan; Armenia | Şevval İlayda Tarhan; Turkey |
| Air Rifle Solo Women | Jeanette Hegg Duestad; Norway | Damla Köse; Turkey | Sheileen Waibel; Austria |
| Air Pistol Trio Women | Turkey; Esra Bozabalı; Şevval İlayda Tarhan; Şimal Yılmaz | Germany; Monika Karsch; Susanne Neisinger; Doreen Vennekamp | Ukraine; Yuliia Isachenko; Viliena Bevz; Olena Kostevych |
| Air Rifle Trio Women | Norway; Jeanette Hegg Duestad; Amalie Evensen; Mari Bårdseng Løvseth | Switzerland; Audrey Gogniat; Chiara Leone; Muriel Zueger | Poland; Izabella Dudek; Julia Mikołowska; Julia Piotrowska |

== Related ==
U18 and U16 10m Championships - 9-15 Feb 2015 - Estonia

| Rank | Nation | Gold | Silver | Bronze | Total |
|---|---|---|---|---|---|
| 1 | Hungary | 8 | 5 | 11 | 24 |
| 2 | Ukraine | 6 | 5 | 6 | 17 |
| 3 | Serbia | 4 | 2 | 0 | 6 |
| 4 | Poland | 3 | 8 | 6 | 17 |
| 5 | Latvia | 3 | 2 | 1 | 6 |
| 6 | Individual Neutral Athletes | 3 | 1 | 1 | 5 |
| 7 | Bulgaria | 2 | 2 | 2 | 6 |
| 8 | Austria | 1 | 2 | 1 | 4 |
| 9 | Georgia | 1 | 1 | 2 | 4 |
| 10 | Croatia | 1 | 1 | 1 | 3 |
| 11 | Armenia | 1 | 1 | 0 | 2 |
| 11 | Bosnia and Herzegovina | 1 | 1 | 0 | 2 |
| 13 | Czech Republic | 1 | 0 | 3 | 4 |
| 14 | Slovenia | 1 | 0 | 1 | 2 |
| 15 | Estonia | 0 | 3 | 1 | 4 |
| 16 | Greece | 0 | 1 | 2 | 3 |
| 17 | Finland | 0 | 1 | 0 | 1 |
| 18 | Lithuania | 0 | 0 | 4 | 4 |
| 18 | Turkey | 0 | 0 | 4 | 4 |
| 20 | Azerbaijan | 0 | 0 | 1 | 1 |
| 20 | Israel | 0 | 0 | 1 | 1 |
| Totals (21 entries) | | 36 | 36 | 48 | 120 |

== Results Book ==
- Senior: https://esc-shooting.org/storage/2025/03/14/45affe5522dd4ec4be2e6f633204ccf606c22c1b.pdf
- Junior: https://esc-shooting.org/storage/2025/03/13/88d5a9136986d66b5085ec62eedfd170e60a35d6.pdf
- U18 / U16: https://esc-shooting.org/storage/2025/02/17/e82116e141a304281fe12dc3b95f05c8e59f3722.pdf
