= Céline Goberville =

French sport shooter (born 1986)

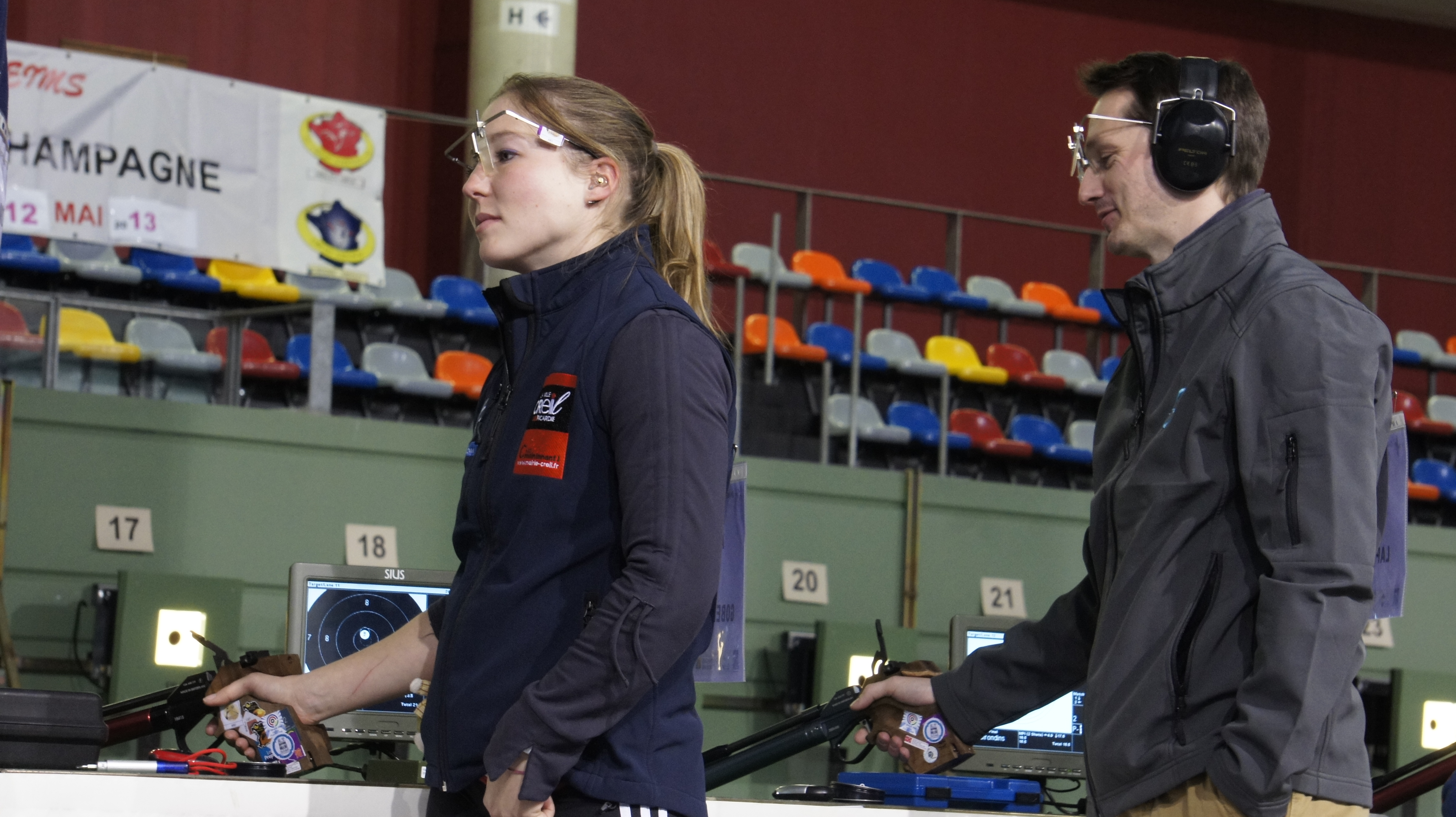

Personal information
- Nationality: France
- Born: 19 September 1986 (age 40)

Sport
- Sport: Shooting
Medal record
Summer Olympics
| Silver medal – second place | 2012 London | 10 m air pistol |
European Games
| Silver medal – second place | 2023 Kraków-Małopolska | 10 m air pistol team |
European championships
| Gold medal – first place | 2011 Brescia | 10 m air pistol |
| Gold medal – first place | 2013 Odense | 10 m air pistol |
| Gold medal – first place | 2025 Osijek | 10 m air pistol team |
Mediterranean Games
| Gold medal – first place | Mersin 2013 | 10 m air pistol |

Céline Goberville (born 19 September 1986) is a French sport shooter. She won silver in the women's 10 metre air pistol at the 2012 Summer Olympics.

She represented France at the 2020 Summer Olympics.
