= Çankaya University =

Private university located in Çankaya, Ankara, Turkey

- Çankaya Üniversitesi
- Type: Private
- Established: 9 July 1997; 28 years ago
- Provost: Prof. Dr. Kenan Taş
- Rector: Prof.Dr. Can Çoğun
- Academic staff: 350
- Students: 7,786
- Location: Ankara, Turkey; 39°49′7.93″N 32°33′46.2″E
- Colors: Black and yellow
- Website: www.cankaya.edu.tr

University rankings

Global – Overall
- THE World: 601–800 (2024)
- USNWR Global: 173 (2023)

Regional – Overall
- QS Emerging Europe and Central Asia: 211–220 (2022)

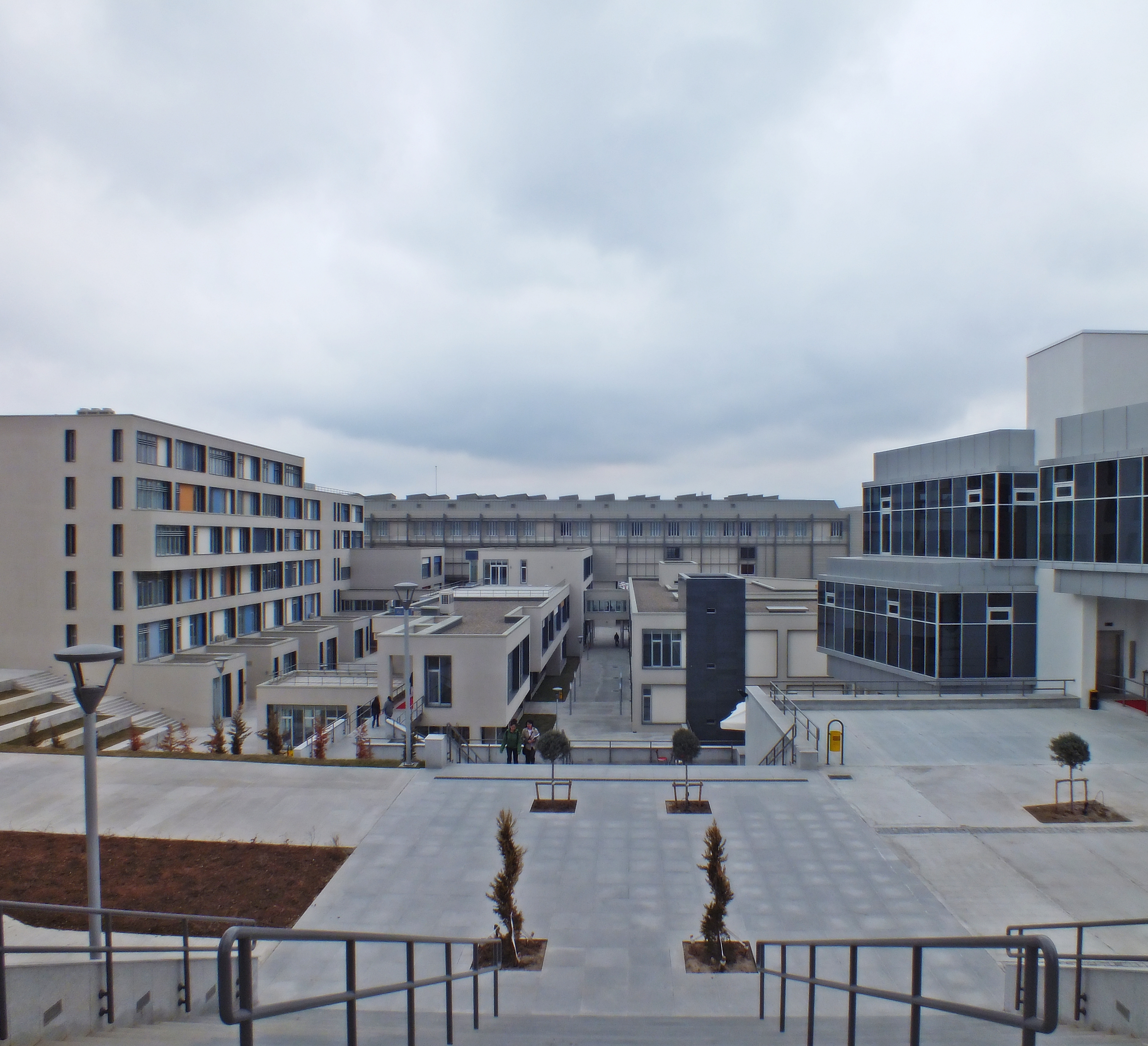
A view of the Turkuaz campus

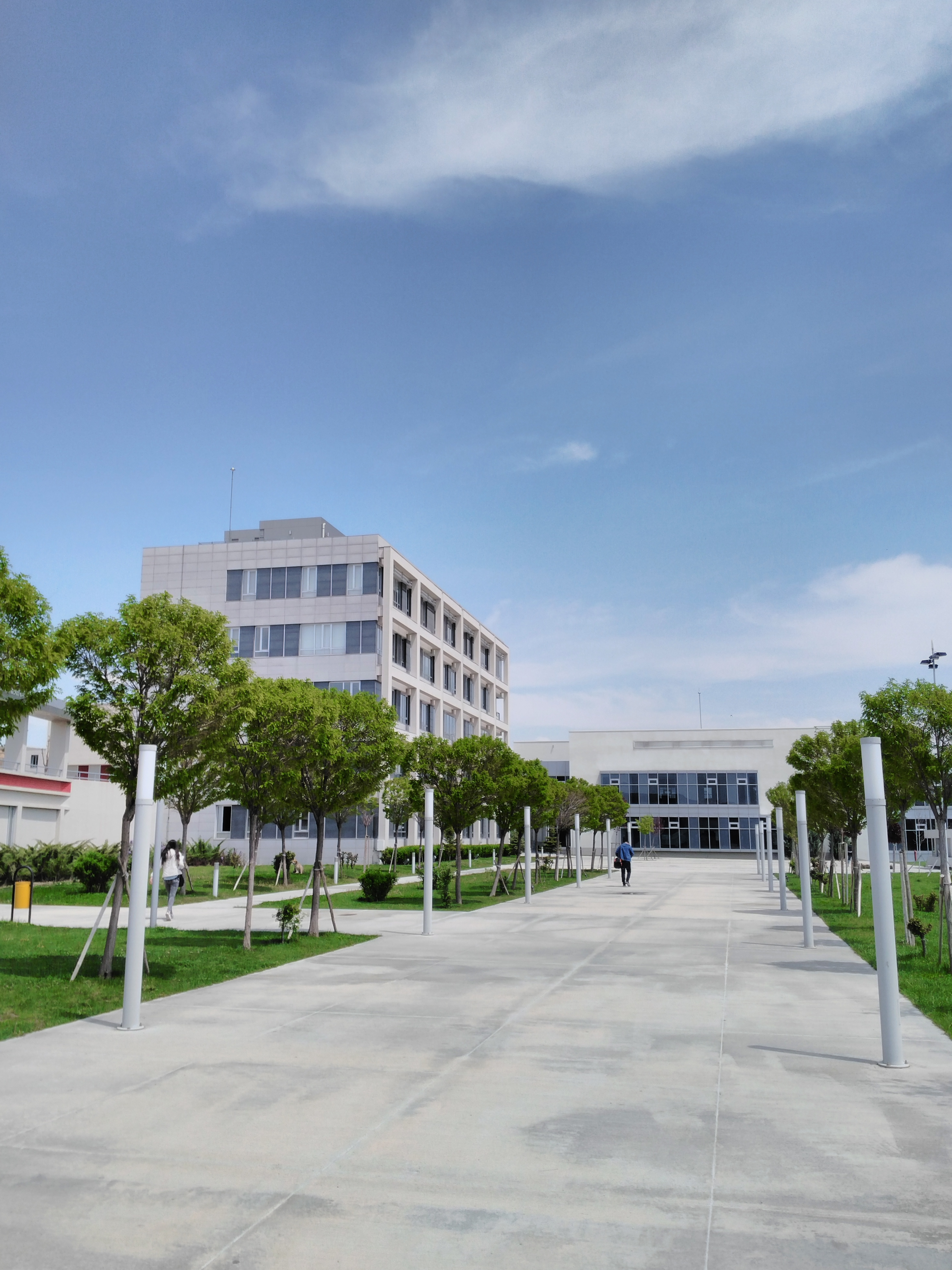
A view of the Turkuaz campus

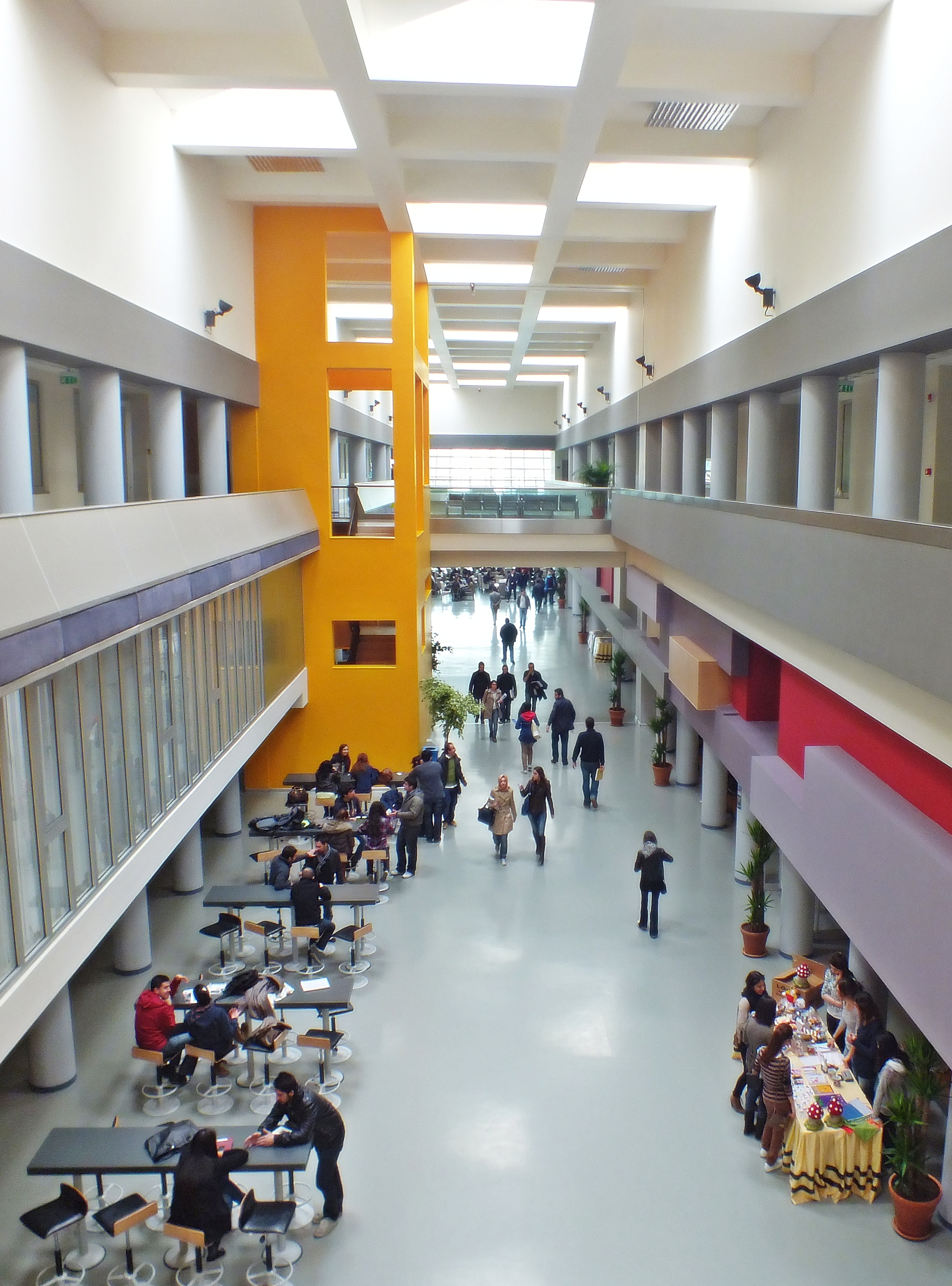
A view of the Common Area of Çankaya University Turkuaz campus

Çankaya University (Turkish: Çankaya Üniversitesi) is a private university in Ankara, Turkey. It was established on July 9, 1997, by the Sıtkı Alp Education Foundation. The university began its teaching in the Fall 1997 semester. Sıtkı Alp is the chairman of the board of trustees. English language is predominant medium of teaching, learning and research at the Çankaya University.

The 2020 Times Higher Education World University Rankings ranked the Çankaya University in the category of the top 401–500 internationally and as 87th among the Emerging Economies Universities. It was the first year that the university was the highest ranked university among both public and private universities in Turkey.

== Academic programs ==
Çankaya University possesses 5 faculties with 21 departments; two institutes with 17 postgraduate master programs and 6 Ph.D. programs; 2 vocational schools with 3 programs; and one English preparatory school to support English language education.

One academic year consists of two semesters each of which includes at least 14 weeks. Lessons are designed for one semester.

== History ==
Çankaya University is a university owned by a private foundation in Çankaya, Ankara, Turkey. The university was established by Sıtkı Alp, as a transition of his secondary education level school, the Arı Koleji, into a higher education institute, and opened by the former president of Turkey, Süleyman Demirel, in 1997.

In 2011, Turkuaz campus that is also known as New Campus opened. Many departments and faculties moved there. Area of Turkuaz campus is approximately 440.000 square meters. In addition, the new campus was awarded by the Arkitera Architecture Center.

== Faculties and departments ==
- Faculty of Architecture includes Architecture, Industrial Design, Interior Architecture, Urban and Regional Planning
- Faculty of Arts and Sciences includes English Language and Literature, Mathematics, Translation and Interpreting Studies (English), Psychology
- Faculty of Economics and Administrative Sciences includes Banking and Finance, Business Administration (Management), Economics, International Trade, Political Science and International Relations
- Faculty of Engineering, includes Civil Engineering, Computer Engineering, Electronics and Communication Engineering, Industrial Engineering, Materials Science and Engineering, Mechanical Engineering, Mechatronics Engineering, Software Engineering
- Faculty of Law
- Vocational High School of Justice
- Çankaya Vocational Training School, including Banking and Insurance, International Trade
- Preparatory School of English

== Institutes ==
- Institute of Natural Sciences:
  - Computer Engineering - Master's degree
  - Electronics and Communication Engineering - Master and Doctorate degree
  - Industrial Engineering - Master's degree
  - Mechanical Engineering - Master and Doctorate degree
  - Maths-computer - Master
  - Information technologies - Master
  - Interior architect - Master
- Institute of Social Sciences:
  - Business administration (MBA) - Master and Doctorate degree
  - Human resources management - Master
  - International trade and finance - Master
  - Public law - Master and Doctorate degree
  - Private law - Master and Doctorate degree
  - English literature and Cultural studies - Master and Doctorate degree
  - Financial economics - Master
  - Political sciences - Master

== Research centers ==
- Center for Entrepreneurship and Application of Innovation and Research
- Center for Research and Application in Law
- Center for Research and Application in Women's Studies
- Center for Research and Application in Atatürk's Principles and the Revolutionary History
- Center for Continuing Education, Consultation and Application

== Sport club ==
Çankaya University Sports Club was established in 1986 as Arı Spor. Later, its name was changed as Çankaya University Sports Club. Currently, the sports club continues its activities at Çankaya University's Balgat Campus.

== Affiliations ==
The university is a member of the Caucasus University Association.
