= Jesper Nyberg =

Swedish sport shooter (born 1994)

Personal information
- Nationality: Swedish
- Born: 11 May 1994 (age 32)

Sport
- Country: Sweden
- Sport: Shooting
- Event: Running target shooting
Medal record
World Championships
Gold medal – first place	2018 Changwon	10 m running target
Gold medal – first place	2018 Changwon	10 m team running target mixed
Gold medal – first place	2018 Changwon	50 m team running target mixed
Gold medal – first place	2023 Baku	50 m running target mixed open
Silver medal – second place	2018 Changwon	50 m team running target
Silver medal – second place	2023 Baku	10 m running target team
Silver medal – second place	2023 Baku	50 m running target open team
Silver medal – second place	2023 Baku	50 m running target mixed open team
Bronze medal – third place	2018 Changwon	10 m team running target
Bronze medal – third place	2018 Changwon	50 m running target mixed
European Championships
Gold medal – first place	2024 Plzeň	50 m running target team
Gold medal – first place	2024 Plzeň	50 m running target mixed team
Gold medal – first place	2025 Chateauroux	50 m Running Target Team
Silver medal – second place	2024 Plzeň	10 m running target team
Silver medal – second place	2024 Plzeň	10 m running target mixed team
Silver medal – second place	2025 Chateauroux	10 m Running Target Team
Silver medal – second place	2025 Chateauroux	50 m Running Target
Gold medal – first place	2026 Yerevan	10 m running target
Silver medal – second place	2026 Yerevan	10 m running target team
Silver medal – second place	2026 Yerevan	10 m running target mixed team

Jesper Nyberg (born 11 May 1994) is a Swedish sport shooter.

He participated at the 2018 ISSF World Shooting Championships, winning a medal.
