= Lilit Mkrtchyan =

Armenian woman sports shooter

Personal information
- Born: 14 April 1996 (age 30)

Sport
- Country: Armenia
- Sport: Shooting
- Events: 10 metre running target; 10 meter running target mixed; 50 metre running target; 50 meter running target mixed
Medal record
Women's shooting
Representing Armenia
ISSF World Championships
Silver medal – second place	2014 Granada	10RT20 Junior
Bronze medal – third place	2022 Châteauroux	10RT20
European Championships
Gold medal – first place	2026 Yerevan	10 m running target
Silver medal – second place	2026 Yerevan	10 m running target Team
Silver medal – second place	2026 Yerevan	10 m running target Mixed Team
Gold medal – first place	2025 Châteauroux	10RT20MIX Women's Team
Silver medal – second place	2025 Châteauroux	10RT20 Women's Team
Silver medal – second place	2025 Châteauroux	50RT Women's Team
Silver medal – second place	2025 Châteauroux	50RT Women's Team
Bronze medal – third place	2025 Châteauroux	50RT
Gold medal – first place	2022 Hamar	10RT20
Gold medal – first place	2022 Hamar	10RT20MIX
Silver medal – second place	2017 Maribor	10RT20
Silver medal – second place	2016 Gyor	10RT20MIX Junior
Gold medal – first place	2015 Arnhem	10RT20 Junior
Bronze medal – third place	2014 Moscow	10RT20 Junior

Lilit Mkrtchyan or Lilit Mkrtchian (Armenian: Լիլիթ Մկրտչյան; born April 14, 1996) is an Armenian woman sports shooter and multiple European champion.

== Career ==
Mkrtchyan started her career training at the Yerevan Children and Youth Sports School of Shooting.

She made her international debut at the 2013 European 10metre Championships in Odense, Denmark where she finished 9th and 11th. In 2014 she won bronze in the 10RT20 Junior event at the European 10metre Championships in Moscow, earning her a place on the Armenian team to the 2014 ISSF World Shooting Championships, where she won junior silver in the same event.

At the 2015 European Championships Mkrtchyan became Junior European Champion.

In 2017, she won her first senior international medal, winning silver in the 10RT20 event.

At the 2022 European Championships she became European Champion in both the 10RT20 and 10RT20MIX events.

At the 2025 European Shooting Championships, Mkrtchyan won five medals, including individual bronze in the Women's 50RT.
