= Shooting at the 2020 Summer Olympics – Qualification =

This article details the qualifying phase for shooting at the 2020 Summer Olympics (which was postponed to at least 2021 due to the COVID-19 pandemic). 300 quota places for the Games are entitled to the shooters coming from their respective NOCs, based on the results at designated ISSF supervised Championships subjected to the ISSF rules from September 1, 2018, to June 6, 2021. Host nation Japan has been guaranteed twelve quota places with one in each of the individual events. Four quota places (top two teams per NOC) will be awarded to the shooters competing in each of the mixed team events (rifle, pistol, and trap), while the highest-ranked shooter, who has not qualified yet or whose NOC does not have a berth in any of the twelve individual events, will obtain a direct Olympic quota place through the World Rankings. The remaining twenty-four quota places are available to the eligible NOCs under the Tripartite Commission Invitation, with two in each of the individual event, to attain a maximum number of 360.

Quota places can be obtained at the 2018 ISSF World Championships, the 2019 ISSF World Cup series, and the designated Continental Championships or Games during the qualifying period. Quota places are allocated only to the National Olympic Committees, with the exception of the ISSF world rankings, which are awarded directly to the individual shooters and may not be changed by the NOC. The NOC may assign a different shooter in each individual or mixed team event, provided that he or she has attained a minimum qualification score (MQS).

== Timeline ==
| Event | Date | Venue |
|---|---|---|
| 2018 ISSF World Shooting Championships | August 31 – September 15, 2018 | (South Korea) Changwon |
| 2018 Shooting Championships of the Americas | November 1–11, 2018 | (Mexico) Guadalajara |
| 2019 ISSF World Cup # 1* | February 20–28, 2019 | (India) New Delhi |
| 2019 ISSF World Cup # 2 | March 15–26, 2019 | (Mexico) Acapulco |
| 2019 ISSF World Cup # 3 | April 5–15, 2019 | (United Arab Emirates) Al Ain |
| 2019 ISSF World Cup # 4 | April 23 – May 1, 2019 | (China) Beijing |
| 2019 ISSF World Cup # 5 | May 7–18, 2019 | (South Korea) Changwon |
| 2019 ISSF World Cup # 6 | May 24 – June 1, 2019 | (Germany) Munich |
| 2019 European Games | June 23–28, 2019 | (Belarus) Minsk |
| 2019 Pan American Games | July 26 – August 11, 2019 | (Peru) Lima |
| 2019 ISSF World Cup # 7 | August 15–22, 2019 | (Finland) Lahti |
| 2019 ISSF World Cup # 8 | August 26 – September 3, 2019 | (Brazil) Rio de Janeiro |
| 2019 European Shotgun Championships | September 3–17, 2019 | (Italy) Lonato |
| 2019 European Championships 25m & 50m events | September 12–23, 2019 | (Italy) Bologna |
| 2019 Oceania Shooting Championships | November 1–9, 2019 | (Australia) Sydney |
| 2019 Asian Shooting Championships | November 3–11, 2019 | (Qatar) Doha |
| 2019 African Shooting Championships | November 17–25, 2019 | (Algeria) Tipasa |
| 2020 European Championships 10m events | February 23 – March 1, 2020 | (Poland) Wrocław |
| 2021 European Shotgun Championships | May 23 – June 6, 2021 | (Croatia) Osijek |
| 2021 European Championships 25m & 50m events | May 23 – June 6, 2021 | (Croatia) Osijek |
| 2021 European Championships 10m events | May 23 – June 6, 2021 | (Croatia) Osijek |
| ISSF World Olympic Rankings | May – June 2021 | — |
| Re-allocation of unused quota places | TBA | — |

== Qualification summary ==
| Nation | Men | | | | | | Women | | | | | | Mixed | | | Total | |
| Nation | FR 3x40 | AR 60 | RFP | AP 60 | TR 125 | SK 125 | R 3x40 | AR 60W | SP | AP 60W | TR 125W | SK 125W | AR MIX | AP MIX | TR MIX | Quotas | Athletes |
|---|---|---|---|---|---|---|---|---|---|---|---|---|---|---|---|---|---|
| Afghanistan | | 1 | | | | | | | | | | | | | | 1 | 1 |
| Albania | | | | | | | | | | 1 | | | | | | 1 | 1 |
| Algeria | | | | | | | | 1 | | | | | | | | 1 | 1 |
| Argentina | 1 | | | | | 1 | | 1 | | | | 1 | | | | 4 | 4 |
| Armenia | | | | | | | | | | 1 | | | | | | 1 | 1 |
| Aruba | | | | 1 | | | | | | | | | | | | 1 | 1 |
| Australia | 1 | 2 | 1 | 1 | 2 | 1 | 1 | 1 | 1 | 1 | 2 | 1 | | | | 15 | 15 |
| Austria | | 1 | | | | | | | | 1 | | | | | | 2 | 2 |
| Azerbaijan | | | 1 | | | 1 | | | | | | | | | | 2 | 2 |
| Bahrain | | | | | | | | | | | | 1 | | | | 1 | 1 |
| Bangladesh | | 1 | | | | | | | | | | | | | | 1 | 1 |
| Belarus | 1 | | | | | | 1 | | | 1 | | | | | | 3 | 3 |
| Belgium | | | | | | | | 1 | | | | | | | | 1 | 1 |
| Bhutan | | | | | | | | 1 | | | | | | | | 1 | 1 |
| Bosnia and Herzegovina | | | | | | | | 1 | | | | | | | | 1 | 1 |
| Brazil | | | | 1 | | | | | | | | | | | | 1 | 1 |
| Bulgaria | | | | | | | | | 2 | | 1 | | | | | 3 | 3 |
| Canada | | | | | | | | | | 1 | | | | | | 1 | 1 |
| Chile | | | | | | | | | | | | 1 | | | | 1 | 1 |
| China | 2 | 2 | 2 | 2 | 1 | | 2 | 2 | 2 | 2 | 2 | 2 | 1 | 2 | | 23 | 24 |
| Colombia | | | 1 | | | | | | | | | | | | | 1 | 1 |
| Croatia | | 2 | | | 1 | | 1 | | | | | | | | | 4 | 4 |
| Cuba | | | 2 | 1 | | | 1 | | | 1 | | | | | | 5 | 5 |
| Cyprus | | | | | 1 | 2 | | | | | | 1 | | | | 4 | 4 |
| Czech Republic | 2 | 1 | | | 2 | 1 | | 1 | | | | 1 | | | | 8 | 8 |
| Denmark | 1 | | | | | 1 | 1 | 1 | | | | | | | | 4 | 4 |
| Ecuador | | | | | | | | | 1 | 1 | | | | | | 2 | 2 |
| Egypt | 1 | 1 | | 1 | 2 | 2 | 1 | | | 2 | 1 | | | | | 11 | 11 |
| Estonia | | | 1 | | | | | | | | | | | | | 1 | 1 |
| Finland | | | | | | 2 | | | | | 1 | | | | | 3 | 3 |
| France | | | 2 | | | 2 | | 1 | 2 | | 2 | 1 | | | | 10 | 10 |
| Georgia | | | | | | | | | | 1 | | | | | | 1 | 1 |
| Germany | | | 2 | | 1 | | 1 | | 2 | 1 | | 1 | | | | 8 | 8 |
| Great Britain | | | | | 2 | | 1 | | | | 1 | 1 | | | | 5 | 5 |
| Greece | | | | | | 1 | | | | 1 | | | | | | 2 | 2 |
| Guatemala | | | | | | 1 | | | | | 2 | | | | | 3 | 3 |
| Hungary | 1 | 1 | | | | | | 1 | 1 | | | | | | | 4 | 4 |
| Iceland | | | | 1 | | | | | | | | | | | | 1 | 1 |
| India | 2 | 2 | | 2 | | 2 | 2 | 2 | 1 | 2 | | | | | | 15 | 15 |
| Indonesia | | | | | | | | 1 | | | | | | | | 1 | 1 |
| Iran | 1 | | | 1 | | | 1 | 2 | | 1 | | | | | | 6 | 6 |
| Iraq | | | | | | | | | | 1 | | | | | | 1 | 1 |
| Ireland | | | | | 1 | | | | | | | | | | | 1 | 1 |
| Israel | | 1 | | | | | | | | | | | | | | 1 | 1 |
| Italy | 2 | 1 | 2 | 1 | 1 | 2 | 1 | | | | 2 | 2 | | | | 14 | 14 |
| Japan | 1 | 1 | 1 | 1 | 1 | 1 | 1 | 1 | 1 | 1 | 1 | 1 | | | | 12 | 12 |
| Jordan | | | | | | | | | | 1 | | | | | | 1 | 1 |
| Kazakhstan | 1 | | | | | | | | | | | 2 | | | | 3 | 3 |
| Kosovo | | 1 | | | | | | | | | | | | | | 1 | 1 |
| Kuwait | | | | | 2 | 2 | | | | | | | | | | 4 | 4 |
| Kyrgyzstan | | | | | | | | 1 | | | | | | | | 1 | 1 |
| Latvia | | | | | | | | | 1 | | | | | | | 1 | 1 |
| Lebanon | | | | | | | | | | | 1 | | | | | 1 | 1 |
| Lithuania | 1 | | | | | | | | | | | | | | | 1 | 1 |
| Malaysia | | | | | | | 1 | | | | | | | | | 1 | 1 |
| Malta | | | | | | | | | 1 | | | | | | | 1 | 1 |
| Mexico | 1 | 1 | | | 1 | | | | | | 1 | 1 | | | | 5 | 5 |
| Moldova | | | | | | | | | | 1 | | | | | | 1 | 1 |
| Mongolia | | | | 1 | | | | 1 | 1 | 1 | | | | | | 4 | 4 |
| Montenegro | | | | | | | | | | 1 | | | | | | 1 | 1 |
| Morocco | | | | | | | | | | | | 1 | | | | 1 | 1 |
| Myanmar | | | | 1 | | | | | | | | | | | | 1 | 1 |
| Nepal | | | | | | | | 1 | | | | | | | | 1 | 1 |
| New Zealand | | | | | | | | | | | 1 | 1 | | | | 2 | 2 |
| Nicaragua | | | | 1 | | | | | | | | | | | | 1 | 1 |
| North Macedonia | | | | 1 | | | | | | | | | | | | 1 | 1 |
| Norway | 2 | | | | | 1 | 2 | | | | | | | | | 5 | 5 |
| Oman | 1 | | | | | | | | | | | | | | | 1 | 1 |
| Pakistan | | | 2 | 1 | | | | | | | | | | | | 3 | 3 |
| Peru | | | 1 | | 1 | 1 | | | | | | | | | | 3 | 3 |
| Philippines | | 1 | | | | | | | | | | | | | | 1 | 1 |
| Poland | 1 | | | | | | | 1 | | 1 | 1 | 1 | | | | 5 | 5 |
| Portugal | | | | | 1 | | | | | | | | | | | 1 | 1 |
| Puerto Rico | | | | | | | 1 | | | | | | | | | 1 | 1 |
| Qatar | | | | | 1 | | | | | | | | | | | 1 | 1 |
| Refugee Olympic Team | | | | | | | | 1 | | | | | | | | 1 | 1 |
| Romania | | | | | | | | 1 | | | | | | | | 1 | 1 |
| ROC | | 2 | 1 | 2 | 1 | | 2 | 1 | 2 | | 2 | 2 | 0 | 1 | 1 | 18 | 17 |
| San Marino | | | | | 1 | | | | | | 1 | | | | | 2 | 2 |
| Saudi Arabia | | | | | | 1 | | | | | | | | | | 1 | 1 |
| Senegal | | | | | | | | | | | | 1 | | | | 1 | 1 |
| Serbia | 1 | 1 | | 1 | | | 1 | 1 | | 2 | | | | | | 7 | 7 |
| Singapore | | | | | | | | 1 | | | | | | | | 1 | 1 |
| Slovakia | | 1 | | 1 | 1 | | | | | | 1 | 1 | | | 2 | 6 | 7 |
| Slovenia | | | | | | | 1 | | | | | | | | | 1 | 1 |
| South Korea | 1 | 1 | 2 | 2 | | 1 | 2 | 2 | 2 | 2 | | | | | | 15 | 15 |
| Spain | | | | | 1 | | | | | | 1 | | | | | 2 | 2 |
| Sri Lanka | | | | | | | | 1 | | | | | | | | 1 | 1 |
| Sweden | | | | | | 1 | | | | | | | | | | 1 | 1 |
| Switzerland | | | | | | | 1 | | 1 | | | | | | | 2 | 2 |
| Chinese Taipei | | 1 | | | 1 | | | 1 | 1 | 1 | | | | | | 5 | 5 |
| Thailand | | | 1 | | 1 | | | | 2 | | | 2 | | | | 6 | 6 |
| Tunisia | | | | 1 | | | | | 1 | | | | | | | 2 | 2 |
| Turkey | | 1 | 1 | 2 | | | | | | | | | | | | 4 | 4 |
| Ukraine | 1 | 1 | | 2 | | | | | 1 | | | 1 | | | | 6 | 6 |
| United Arab Emirates | | | | | | 1 | | | | | | | | | | 1 | 1 |
| United States | 2 | 2 | 2 | 1 | 2 | 2 | 2 | 1 | 2 | | 2 | 2 | | | | 20 | 20 |
| Uzbekistan | | | | | | | 1 | | | | | | | | | 1 | 1 |
| Venezuela | 1 | | | | | | | | | | | | | | | 1 | 1 |
| Vietnam | | | | 1 | | | | | | | | | | | | 1 | 1 |
| Yemen | | | | | | | | | | 1 | | | | | | 1 | 1 |
| Total: 101 NOCs | 29 | 30 | 25 | 31 | 29 | 30 | 29 | 32 | 28 | 31 | 26 | 29 | 1 | 3 | 3 | 355 | 356 |

== 50 m rifle three positions men ==
| Event | Places | Nation | Qualified athlete | Announced competitor |
|---|---|---|---|---|
| Host nation | 1 | Japan | —N/a | Takayuki Matsumoto |
| 2018 World Championships | 4 | Poland | Tomasz Bartnik | Tomasz Bartnik |
| 2018 World Championships | 4 | United States | Michael McPhail | Nickolaus Mowrer |
| 2018 World Championships | 4 | Norway | Henrik Larsen | Henrik Larsen |
| 2018 World Championships | 4 | China | Yang Haoran | Zhang Changhong |
| 2018 Championships of the Americas | 1 | United States | George Norton | Patrick Sunderman |
| 2019 ISSF World Cup # 1 | 2 | Hungary | István Péni | István Péni |
| 2019 ISSF World Cup # 1 | 2 | Italy | Marco de Nicolo | Marco de Nicolo |
| 2019 ISSF World Cup # 4 | 2 | Czech Republic | Filip Nepejchal | Jiří Přívratský |
| 2019 ISSF World Cup # 4 | 2 | China | Zhao Zhonghao | Zhao Zhonghao |
| 2019 ISSF World Cup # 6 | 2 | South Korea | Kim Jong-hyun | Kim Sang-do |
| 2019 ISSF World Cup # 6 | 2 | Serbia | Milutin Stefanović | Milutin Stefanović |
| 2019 European Games | 1 | Belarus | Yury Shcherbatsevich | Yury Shcherbatsevich |
| 2019 Pan American Games | 2 | Mexico | José Luis Sánchez | José Luis Sánchez |
| 2019 Pan American Games | 2 | Argentina | Alexis Eberhardt | Alexis Eberhardt |
| 2019 ISSF World Cup # 8 | 2 | India | Sanjeev Rajput | Sanjeev Rajput |
| 2019 ISSF World Cup # 8 | 2 | Norway | Simon Claussen | Jon-Hermann Hegg |
| 2019 European Championships 25m & 50m events | 2 | Czech Republic | Petr Nymburský | Petr Nymburský |
| 2019 European Championships 25m & 50m events | 2 | Italy | Lorenzo Bacci | Lorenzo Bacci |
| 2019 Oceania Championships | 1 | Australia | Jack Rossiter | Jack Rossiter |
| 2019 Asian Championships | 3 | India | Aishwary Tomar | Aishwary Tomar |
| 2019 Asian Championships | 3 | Iran | Mahyar Sedaghat | Mahyar Sedaghat |
| 2019 Asian Championships | 3 | Kazakhstan | Yuriy Yurkov | Yuriy Yurkov |
| 2019 African Championships | 1 | Egypt | Osama El-Saeid | Osama El-Saeid |
| 2021 European Championships 25m & 50m events | 1 | Lithuania | Karolis Girulis | Karolis Girulis |
| ISSF World Olympic Rankings | 1 | Denmark | —N/a | Steffen Olsen |
| Exchange of quota places | 1 | Ukraine | —N/a | Serhiy Kulish |
| Tripartite Commission Invitation | 1 | Oman | —N/a | Hamed Said Al-Khatri |
| Reallocation of unused quota^{[d]} | 1 | Venezuela | —N/a | Julio Iemma |
| Athletes qualified in other events | 10 | Australia | —N/a | Dane Sampson |
| Athletes qualified in other events | 10 | Croatia | —N/a | Petar Gorša |
| Athletes qualified in other events | 10 | Croatia | —N/a | Miran Maričić |
| Athletes qualified in other events | 10 | Hungary | —N/a | Zalán Pekler |
| Athletes qualified in other events | 10 | Japan | —N/a | Naoya Okada |
| Athletes qualified in other events | 10 | ROC | —N/a | Sergey Kamenskiy |
| Athletes qualified in other events | 10 | Serbia | —N/a | Milenko Sebić |
| Athletes qualified in other events | 10 | Slovakia | —N/a | Patrik Jány |
| Athletes qualified in other events | 10 | Turkey | —N/a | Ömer Akgün |
| Athletes qualified in other events | 10 | Ukraine | —N/a | Oleh Tsarkov |
| Total | 39 | | | |

== 10 m air rifle men ==
| Event | Places | Nation | Qualified athlete | Announced competitor |
|---|---|---|---|---|
| 2018 World Championships | 4 | ROC | Sergey Kamenskiy | Sergey Kamenskiy |
| 2018 World Championships | 4 | Croatia | Petar Gorša | Petar Gorša |
| 2018 World Championships | 4 | Croatia | Miran Maričić | Miran Maričić |
| 2018 World Championships | 4 | China | Hui Zicheng | Yang Haoran |
| 2018 Championships of the Americas | 1 | United States | Dempster Christenson | Will Shaner |
| 2019 ISSF World Cup # 1 | 2 | China | Liu Yukun | Sheng Lihao |
| 2019 ISSF World Cup # 1 | 2 | Austria | Martin Strempfl | Martin Strempfl |
| 2019 ISSF World Cup # 4 | 2 | India | Divyansh Singh Panwar | Divyansh Singh Panwar |
| 2019 ISSF World Cup # 4 | 2 | ROC | Grigory Shamakov | Vladimir Maslennikov |
| 2019 ISSF World Cup # 6 | 2 | Ukraine | Oleh Tsarkov | Oleh Tsarkov |
| 2019 ISSF World Cup # 6 | 2 | Italy | Marco Suppini | Marco Suppini |
| 2019 European Games | 1 | Israel | Sergey Richter | Sergey Richter |
| 2019 Pan American Games | 2 | United States | Lucas Kozeniesky | Lucas Kozeniesky |
| 2019 Pan American Games | 2 | Mexico | Edson Ramírez | Edson Ramírez |
| 2019 ISSF World Cup # 8 | 2 | Slovakia | Patrik Jány | Patrik Jány |
| 2019 ISSF World Cup # 8 | 2 | Australia | Dane Sampson | Dane Sampson |
| 2019 Oceania Championships | 1 | Australia | Alex Hoberg | Alex Hoberg |
| 2019 Asian Championships | 3 | India | Deepak Kumar | Deepak Kumar |
| 2019 Asian Championships | 3 | Chinese Taipei | Lu Shao-chuan | Lu Shao-chuan |
| 2019 Asian Championships | 3 | Japan | Masaya Endō | Naoya Okada |
| 2019 African Championships | 1 | Egypt | Youssef Makkar | Youssef Makkar |
| 2020 European Championships 10m events | 2 | Hungary | Péter Sidi | Zalán Pekler |
| 2020 European Championships 10m events | 2 | Turkey | Ömer Akgün | Ömer Akgün |
| 2021 European Championships 10m events | 2 | Serbia | Milenko Sebić | Milenko Sebić |
| 2021 European Championships 10m events | 2 | Czech Republic | David Hrčkulák | David Hrčkulák |
| ISSF World Olympic Rankings | 1 | South Korea | —N/a | Nam Tae-yun |
| Tripartite Commission Invitation | 3 | Afghanistan | —N/a | Mahdi Yovari |
| Tripartite Commission Invitation | 3 | Bangladesh | —N/a | Abdullah Hel Baki |
| Tripartite Commission Invitation | 3 | Kosovo | —N/a | Drilon Ibrahimi |
| Reallocation of unused quota | 1 | Philippines | —N/a | Jayson Valdez |
| Athletes qualified in other events | 17 | Argentina | —N/a | Alexis Eberhardt |
| Athletes qualified in other events | 17 | Belarus | —N/a | Yury Shcherbatsevich |
| Athletes qualified in other events | 17 | Czech Republic | —N/a | Jiří Přívratský |
| Athletes qualified in other events | 17 | Egypt | —N/a | Osama El-Saeid |
| Athletes qualified in other events | 17 | Hungary | —N/a | István Péni |
| Athletes qualified in other events | 17 | Iran | —N/a | Mahyar Sedaghat |
| Athletes qualified in other events | 17 | Italy | —N/a | Lorenzo Bacci |
| Athletes qualified in other events | 17 | Japan | —N/a | Takayuki Matsumoto |
| Athletes qualified in other events | 17 | Kazakhstan | —N/a | Yuriy Yurkov |
| Athletes qualified in other events | 17 | South Korea | —N/a | Kim Sang-do |
| Athletes qualified in other events | 17 | Lithuania | —N/a | Karolis Girulis |
| Athletes qualified in other events | 17 | Norway | —N/a | Jon-Hermann Hegg |
| Athletes qualified in other events | 17 | Norway | —N/a | Henrik Larsen |
| Athletes qualified in other events | 17 | Poland | —N/a | Tomasz Bartnik |
| Athletes qualified in other events | 17 | Serbia | —N/a | Milutin Stefanović |
| Athletes qualified in other events | 17 | Ukraine | —N/a | Serhiy Kulish |
| Athletes qualified in other events | 17 | Venezuela | —N/a | Julio Iemma |
| Total | 47 | | | |

== 25 m rapid fire pistol men ==
| Event | Places | Nation | Qualified athlete | Announced competitor |
|---|---|---|---|---|
| 2018 World Championships | 4 | China | Lin Junmin | Lin Junmin |
| 2018 World Championships | 4 | China | Zhang Jian | Li Yuehong |
| 2018 World Championships | 4 | France | Jean Quiquampoix | Jean Quiquampoix |
| 2018 World Championships | 4 | ROC | Alexei Klimov | Leonid Ekimov |
| 2018 Championships of the Americas | 1 | Cuba | Leuris Pupo | Leuris Pupo |
| 2019 ISSF World Cup # 4^{[a]} | 2 | Germany | Oliver Geis | Oliver Geis |
| 2019 ISSF World Cup # 4^{[a]} | 2 | United States | Henry Leverett | Henry Leverett |
| 2019 ISSF World Cup # 4^{[a]} | 2 | ~~Ukraine~~ | ~~Oleksandr Petriv~~ | — |
| 2019 ISSF World Cup # 6^{[a]} | 2 | France | Clément Bessaguet | Clément Bessaguet |
| 2019 ISSF World Cup # 6^{[a]} | 2 | ~~ROC~~ | ~~Alexander Alifirenko~~ | — |
| 2019 ISSF World Cup # 6^{[a]} | 2 | Germany | Christian Reitz | Christian Reitz |
| 2019 European Games | 1 | Turkey | Özgür Varlık | Özgür Varlık |
| 2019 Pan American Games | 2 | Cuba | Jorge Álvarez | Jorge Álvarez |
| 2019 Pan American Games | 2 | Peru | Marko Carrillo | Marko Carrillo |
| 2019 ISSF World Cup # 8 | 2 | Pakistan | Muhammad Khalil Akhtar | Muhammad Khalil Akhtar |
| 2019 ISSF World Cup # 8 | 2 | South Korea | Kim Jun-hong | Han Dae-yoon |
| 2019 European Championships 25m & 50m events | 2 | Italy | Riccardo Mazzetti | Riccardo Mazzetti |
| 2019 European Championships 25m & 50m events | 2 | Azerbaijan | Ruslan Lunev | Ruslan Lunev |
| 2019 Oceania Championships | 1 | Australia | Sergei Evglevski | Sergei Evglevski |
| 2019 Asian Championships | 4 | Japan | Teruyoshi Akiyama | Dai Yoshioka |
| 2019 Asian Championships | 4 | South Korea | Song Jong-ho | Song Jong-ho |
| 2019 Asian Championships | 4 | Pakistan | Ghulam Mustafa Bashir | Ghulam Mustafa Bashir |
| 2019 Asian Championships | 4 | Thailand | Isaranuudom Phurihiranphat | Isaranuudom Phurihiranphat |
| 2021 European Championships 25m & 50m events | 1 | Italy | Tommaso Chelli | Tommaso Chelli |
| ISSF World Olympic Rankings | 1 | Estonia | —N/a | Peeter Olesk |
| Exchange of quota places | 1 | United States | —N/a | Jack Leverett III^{[h]} |
| Reallocation of unused quota^{[c]}^{[e]} | 1 | Colombia | —N/a | Bernardo Tobar Prado |
| Athletes qualified in other events | 2 | Mongolia | —N/a | Enkhtaivany Davaakhüü |
| Athletes qualified in other events | 2 | Ukraine | —N/a | Pavlo Korostylov |
| Total | 27 | | | |

== 10 m air pistol men ==
| Event | Places | Nation | Qualified athlete | Announced competitor |
|---|---|---|---|---|
| Host nation | 1 | Japan | —N/a | Kojiro Horimizu |
| 2018 World Championships | 4 | South Korea | Jin Jong-oh | Jin Jong-oh |
| 2018 World Championships | 4 | ROC | Artem Chernousov | Artem Chernousov |
| 2018 World Championships | 4 | South Korea | Lee Dae-myung | Kim Mo-se |
| 2018 World Championships | 4 | Ukraine | Pavlo Korostylov | Pavlo Korostylov |
| 2018 Championships of the Americas | 1 | United States | James Hall | James Hall |
| 2019 ISSF World Cup # 1 | 2 | India | Saurabh Chaudhary | Saurabh Chaudhary |
| 2019 ISSF World Cup # 1 | 2 | Serbia | Damir Mikec | Damir Mikec |
| 2019 ISSF World Cup # 4 | 2 | India | Abhishek Verma | Abhishek Verma |
| 2019 ISSF World Cup # 4 | 2 | Mongolia | Enkhtaivany Davaakhüü | Enkhtaivany Davaakhüü |
| 2019 ISSF World Cup # 6 | 2 | China | Pang Wei | Pang Wei |
| 2019 ISSF World Cup # 6 | 2 | China | Wu Jiayu | Zhang Bowen |
| 2019 European Games | 1 | Ukraine | Oleh Omelchuk | Oleh Omelchuk |
| 2019 Pan American Games | 1 | Cuba | Jorge Grau | Jorge Grau |
| 2019 Pan American Games | 1 | ~~United States~~ | ~~Nickolaus Mowrer~~ | — |
| 2019 ISSF World Cup # 8 | 2 | Turkey | İsmail Keleş | İsmail Keleş |
| 2019 ISSF World Cup # 8 | 2 | Turkey | Yusuf Dikeç | Yusuf Dikeç |
| 2019 Oceania Championships | 1 | Australia | Bailey Groves | Daniel Repacholi |
| 2019 Asian Championships | 2 | Iran | Javad Foroughi | Javad Foroughi |
| 2019 Asian Championships | 2 | Pakistan | Gulfam Joseph | Gulfam Joseph |
| 2019 African Championships | 2 | Tunisia | Ala Al-Othmani | Ala Al-Othmani |
| 2019 African Championships | 2 | Egypt | Samy Abdel Razek | Samy Abdel Razek |
| 2020 European Championships 10m events | 2 | Italy | Paolo Monna | Paolo Monna |
| 2020 European Championships 10m events | 2 | Slovakia | Juraj Tužinský | Juraj Tužinský |
| 2021 European Championships 10m events | 1 | ROC | Vadim Mukhametyanov | Vadim Mukhametyanov |
| ISSF World Olympic Rankings | 1 | Brazil | —N/a | Felipe Almeida Wu |
| Tripartite Commission Invitation | 4 | Aruba | —N/a | Philip Elhage |
| Tripartite Commission Invitation | 4 | Myanmar | —N/a | Ye Tun Naung |
| Tripartite Commission Invitation | 4 | Nicaragua | —N/a | Edwin Barberena |
| Tripartite Commission Invitation | 4 | North Macedonia | —N/a | Borjan Brankovski |
| Reallocation of unused quota^{[g]} | 2 | Iceland | —N/a | Asgeir Sigurgeirsson |
| Reallocation of unused quota^{[g]} | 2 | Vietnam | —N/a | Hoàng Xuân Vinh |
| Athletes qualified in other events | 5 | Azerbaijan | —N/a | Ruslan Lunev |
| Athletes qualified in other events | 5 | Estonia | —N/a | Peeter Olesk |
| Athletes qualified in other events | 5 | Germany | —N/a | Christian Reitz |
| Athletes qualified in other events | 5 | Peru | —N/a | Marko Carrillo |
| Athletes qualified in other events | 5 | United States | —N/a | Nickolaus Mowrer |
| Total | 36 | | | |

== Trap men ==
| Event | Places | Nation | Qualified athlete | Announced competitor |
|---|---|---|---|---|
| Host nation | 1 | Japan | —N/a | Shigetaka Oyama |
| 2018 World Championships | 4 | Spain | Alberto Fernández | Alberto Fernández |
| 2018 World Championships | 4 | Kuwait | Abdulrahman Al-Faihan | Abdulrahman Al-Faihan |
| 2018 World Championships | 4 | Slovakia | Erik Varga | Erik Varga |
| 2018 World Championships | 4 | Australia | James Willett | James Willett |
| 2018 Championships of the Americas | 2 | Peru | Alessandro de Souza | Alessandro de Souza |
| 2018 Championships of the Americas | 2 | Mexico | Jorge Orozco | Jorge Orozco |
| 2019 ISSF World Cup # 2 | 2 | Egypt | Ahmed Zaher | Ahmed Zaher |
| 2019 ISSF World Cup # 2 | 2 | China | Yu Haicheng | Yu Haicheng |
| 2019 ISSF World Cup # 3 | 2 | Croatia | Josip Glasnović | Josip Glasnović |
| 2019 ISSF World Cup # 3 | 2 | Thailand | Savate Sresthaporn | Savate Sresthaporn |
| 2019 ISSF World Cup # 5 | 2 | Cyprus | Andreas Makri | Andreas Makri |
| 2019 ISSF World Cup # 5 | 2 | Great Britain | Matthew Coward-Holley | Matthew Coward-Holley |
| 2019 European Games | 1 | Czech Republic | David Kostelecký | David Kostelecký |
| 2019 Pan American Games | 2 | United States | Brian Burrows | Brian Burrows |
| 2019 Pan American Games | 2 | United States | Derek Haldeman | Derrick Mein |
| 2019 ISSF World Cup # 7 | 2 | ROC | Alexey Alipov | Alexey Alipov |
| 2019 ISSF World Cup # 7 | 2 | Portugal | João Azevedo | João Azevedo |
| 2019 European Shotgun Championships | 2 | Czech Republic | Jiří Lipták | Jiří Lipták |
| 2019 European Shotgun Championships | 2 | Great Britain | Aaron Heading | Aaron Heading |
| 2019 Oceania Championships | 1 | Australia | Mitchell Iles | Thomas Grice |
| 2019 Asian Championships | 3 | Kuwait | Talal Al-Rashidi | Talal Al-Rashidi |
| 2019 Asian Championships | 3 | Chinese Taipei | Yang Kun-pi | Yang Kun-pi |
| 2019 Asian Championships | 3 | Qatar | Mohammed Al-Rumaihi | Mohammed Al-Rumaihi |
| 2019 African Championships | 1 | Egypt | Abdel-Aziz Mehelba | Abdel-Aziz Mehelba |
| 2021 European Shotgun Championships | 1 | Italy | Mauro de Filippis | Mauro de Filippis |
| ISSF World Olympic Rankings | 1 | Germany | —N/a | Andreas Löw |
| Tripartite Commission Invitation | 1 | San Marino | —N/a | Gian Marco Berti |
| Reallocation of unused quota | 1 | Ireland | —N/a | Derek Burnett |
| Total | 29 | | | |

== Skeet men ==
| Event | Places | Nation | Qualified athlete | Announced competitor |
|---|---|---|---|---|
| Host nation | 1 | Japan | —N/a | Hiroyuki Ikawa |
| 2018 World Championships | 4 | United States | Vincent Hancock | Vincent Hancock |
| 2018 World Championships | 4 | Norway | Erik Watndal | Erik Watndal |
| 2018 World Championships | 4 | Italy | Riccardo Filippelli | Tammaro Cassandro |
| 2018 World Championships | 4 | France | Emmanuel Petit | Emmanuel Petit |
| 2018 Championships of the Americas | 1 | United States | Frank Thompson | Phillip Jungman |
| 2019 ISSF World Cup # 2 | 2 | Italy | Gabriele Rossetti | Gabriele Rossetti |
| 2019 ISSF World Cup # 2 | 2 | Czech Republic | Jakub Tomeček | Jakub Tomeček |
| 2019 ISSF World Cup # 3 | 2 | Kuwait | Mansour Al-Rashidi | Mansour Al-Rashidi |
| 2019 ISSF World Cup # 3 | 2 | Denmark | Jesper Hansen | Jesper Hansen |
| 2019 ISSF World Cup # 5 | 2 | South Korea | Kang Hyun-suk | Lee Jong-jun |
| 2019 ISSF World Cup # 5 | 2 | Finland | Lari Pesonen | Lari Pesonen |
| 2019 European Games | 1 | Sweden | Stefan Nilsson | Stefan Nilsson |
| 2019 Pan American Games | 2 | Guatemala | Juan Schaeffer | Juan Schaeffer |
| 2019 Pan American Games | 2 | Peru | Nicolás Pacheco | Nicolás Pacheco |
| 2019 ISSF World Cup # 7 | 2 | France | Éric Delaunay | Éric Delaunay |
| 2019 ISSF World Cup # 7 | 2 | Egypt | Azmy Mehelba | Azmy Mehelba |
| 2019 European Shotgun Championships | 2 | Greece | Nikolaos Mavrommatis | Nikolaos Mavrommatis |
| 2019 European Shotgun Championships | 2 | Cyprus | Dimitris Konstantinou | Dimitris Konstantinou |
| 2019 Oceania Championships | 1 | Australia | Paul Adams | Paul Adams |
| 2019 Asian Championships | 3 | India | Angad Bajwa | Angad Bajwa |
| 2019 Asian Championships | 3 | India | Mairaj Ahmad Khan | Mairaj Ahmad Khan |
| 2019 Asian Championships | 3 | Kuwait | Saud Habib | Abdullah Al-Rashidi |
| 2019 African Championships | 1 | Egypt | Mostafa Hamdy | Mostafa Hamdy |
| 2021 European Shotgun Championships | 2 | Cyprus | Georgios Achilleos | Georgios Achilleos |
| 2021 European Shotgun Championships | 2 | Finland | Eetu Kallioinen | Eetu Kallioinen |
| ISSF World Olympic Rankings | 1 | Argentina | —N/a | Federico Gil |
| Reallocation of unused quota | 3 | Azerbaijan | —N/a | Emin Jafarov |
| Reallocation of unused quota | 3 | Saudi Arabia | —N/a | Saeed Al-Mutairi |
| Reallocation of unused quota | 3 | United Arab Emirates | —N/a | Saif Bin Futtais |
| Total | 30 | | | |

== 50 m rifle three positions women ==
| Event | Places | Nation | Qualified athlete | Announced competitor |
|---|---|---|---|---|
| 2018 World Championships | 4 | ROC | Yulia Karimova | Yulia Karimova |
| 2018 World Championships | 4 | Germany | Isabella Straub | Jolyn Beer |
| 2018 World Championships | 4 | Croatia | Snježana Pejčić | Snježana Pejčić |
| 2018 World Championships | 4 | Great Britain | Seonaid McIntosh | Seonaid McIntosh |
| 2018 Championships of the Americas | 1 | United States | Sarah Beard | Sagen Maddalena |
| 2019 ISSF World Cup # 1 | 2 | Switzerland | Nina Christen | Nina Christen |
| 2019 ISSF World Cup # 1 | 2 | China | Shi Mengyao | Shi Mengyao |
| 2019 ISSF World Cup # 4 | 2 | South Korea | Bae Sang-hee | Bae Sang-hee |
| 2019 ISSF World Cup # 4 | 2 | Norway | Jeanette Hegg Duestad | Jeanette Hegg Duestad |
| 2019 ISSF World Cup # 6 | 2 | ROC | Yulia Zykova | Yulia Zykova |
| 2019 ISSF World Cup # 6 | 2 | Norway | Katrine Lund | Jenny Stene |
| 2019 European Games | 1 | Serbia | Sanja Vukašinović | Sanja Vukašinović |
| 2019 Pan American Games | 2 | Cuba | Eglis Yaima Cruz | Eglis Yaima Cruz |
| 2019 Pan American Games | 2 | United States | Virginia Thrasher | Mary Tucker |
| 2019 ISSF World Cup # 8 | 2 | South Korea | Kim Je-hee | Cho Eun-young |
| 2019 ISSF World Cup # 8 | 2 | China | Pei Ruijiao | Chen Dongqi |
| 2019 European Championships 25m & 50m events | 2 | Belarus | Maria Martynova | Maria Martynova |
| 2019 European Championships 25m & 50m events | 2 | Denmark | Stine Nielsen | Rikke Ibsen |
| 2019 Oceania Championships | 1 | Australia | Emma Adams | Katarina Kowplos |
| 2019 Asian Championships | 3 | Japan | Shiori Hirata | Shiori Hirata |
| 2019 Asian Championships | 3 | India | Tejaswini Sawant | Tejaswini Sawant |
| 2019 Asian Championships | 3 | Iran | Fatemeh Karamzadeh | Najmeh Khedmati |
| 2019 African Championships | 1 | Egypt | Merna Tayee | Alzahraa Shaban |
| 2021 European Championships 25m & 50m events | 1 | Italy | Sofia Ceccarello | Sofia Ceccarello |
| ISSF World Olympic Rankings | 1 | Slovenia | —N/a | Živa Dvoršak |
| Exchange of quota places | 1 | India | —N/a | Anjum Moudgil^{[f]} |
| Reallocation of unused quota^{[c]}^{[d]} | 3 | Malaysia | —N/a | Nur Suryani Mohd Taibi |
| Reallocation of unused quota^{[c]}^{[d]} | 3 | Puerto Rico | —N/a | Yarimar Mercado |
| Reallocation of unused quota^{[c]}^{[d]} | 3 | Uzbekistan | —N/a | Mukhtasar Tokhirova |
| Athletes qualified in other events | 8 | Czech Republic | —N/a | Nikola Mazurová |
| Athletes qualified in other events | 8 | France | —N/a | Océanne Muller |
| Athletes qualified in other events | 8 | Hungary | —N/a | Eszter Mészáros |
| Athletes qualified in other events | 8 | Indonesia | —N/a | Vidya Rafika Toyyiba |
| Athletes qualified in other events | 8 | Iran | —N/a | Najmeh Khedmati |
| Athletes qualified in other events | 8 | Mongolia | —N/a | Oyuunbatyn Yesügen |
| Athletes qualified in other events | 8 | Poland | —N/a | Aneta Stankiewicz |
| Athletes qualified in other events | 8 | Serbia | —N/a | Andrea Arsović |
| Total | 37 | | | |

== 10 m air rifle women ==
| Event | Places | Nation | Qualified athlete | Announced competitor |
|---|---|---|---|---|
| Host nation | 1 | Japan | —N/a | Haruka Nakaguchi |
| 2018 World Championships | 4 | South Korea | Im Ha-na | Kwon Eun-ji |
| 2018 World Championships | 4 | India | Anjum Moudgil | Elavenil Valarivan |
| 2018 World Championships | 4 | South Korea | Jung Eun-hea | Park Hee-moon |
| 2018 World Championships | 4 | India | Apurvi Chandela | Apurvi Chandela |
| 2018 Championships of the Americas | 0 | ~~United States~~ | ~~Minden Miles~~ | — |
| 2019 ISSF World Cup # 1 | 2 | China | Zhao Ruozhu | Yang Qian |
| 2019 ISSF World Cup # 1 | 2 | China | Xu Hong | Wang Luyao |
| 2019 ISSF World Cup # 4 | 2 | Iran | Najmeh Khedmati | Fatemeh Karamzadeh |
| 2019 ISSF World Cup # 4 | 2 | Denmark | Anna Nielsen | Anna Nielsen |
| 2019 ISSF World Cup # 6 | 2 | Romania | Laura-Georgeta Coman | Laura-Georgeta Coman |
| 2019 ISSF World Cup # 6 | 2 | Hungary | Eszter Mészáros | Eszter Mészáros |
| 2019 European Games | 1 | Czech Republic | Nikola Mazurová | Nikola Mazurová |
| 2019 Pan American Games | 2 | United States | Alison Weisz | Alison Weisz |
| 2019 Pan American Games | 2 | Argentina | Fernanda Russo | Fernanda Russo |
| 2019 ISSF World Cup # 8 | 2 | Chinese Taipei | Lin Ying-shin | Lin Ying-shin |
| 2019 ISSF World Cup # 8 | 2 | Iran | Armina Sadeghian | Armina Sadeghian |
| 2019 Oceania Championships | 1 | Australia | Victoria Rossiter | Elise Collier |
| 2019 Asian Championships | 3 | Singapore | Tessa Neo | Adele Tan |
| 2019 Asian Championships | 3 | Mongolia | Oyuunbatyn Yesügen | Oyuunbatyn Yesügen |
| 2019 Asian Championships | 3 | Indonesia | Vidya Rafika Toyyiba | Vidya Rafika Toyyiba |
| 2019 African Championships | 1 | Algeria^{[b]} | Houda Chaabi | Houda Chaabi |
| 2020 European Championships 10m events | 2 | ROC | Anastasiia Galashina | Anastasiia Galashina |
| 2020 European Championships 10m events | 2 | Serbia | Andrea Arsović | Andrea Arsović |
| 2021 European Championships 10m events | 2 | France | Océanne Muller | Océanne Muller |
| 2021 European Championships 10m events | 2 | Belgium | Jessie Kaps | Jessie Kaps |
| ISSF World Olympic Rankings | 1 | Poland | —N/a | Aneta Stankiewicz |
| Reallocation of unused quota | 2 | Bosnia and Herzegovina | —N/a | Tatjana Đekanović |
| Reallocation of unused quota | 2 | Kyrgyzstan | —N/a | Kanykei Kubanychbekova |
| Invitational Places | 1 | Refugee Olympic Team | —N/a | Luna Solomon |
| Tripartite Commission Invitation | 3 | Bhutan | —N/a | Lenchu Kunzang |
| Tripartite Commission Invitation | 3 | Nepal | —N/a | Kalpana Pariyar |
| Tripartite Commission Invitation | 3 | Sri Lanka | —N/a | Tehani Egodawela |
| Athletes qualified in other events | 18 | Australia | —N/a | Katarina Kowplos |
| Athletes qualified in other events | 18 | Belarus | —N/a | Maria Martynova |
| Athletes qualified in other events | 18 | Croatia | —N/a | Snježana Pejčić |
| Athletes qualified in other events | 18 | Cuba | —N/a | Eglis Yaima Cruz |
| Athletes qualified in other events | 18 | Denmark | —N/a | Rikke Ibsen |
| Athletes qualified in other events | 18 | Egypt | —N/a | Alzahraa Shaban |
| Athletes qualified in other events | 18 | Great Britain | —N/a | Seonaid McIntosh |
| Athletes qualified in other events | 18 | Germany | —N/a | Jolyn Beer |
| Athletes qualified in other events | 18 | Italy | —N/a | Sofia Ceccarello |
| Athletes qualified in other events | 18 | Japan | —N/a | Shiori Hirata |
| Athletes qualified in other events | 18 | Norway | —N/a | Jeanette Hegg Duestad |
| Athletes qualified in other events | 18 | Norway | —N/a | Jenny Stene |
| Athletes qualified in other events | 18 | ROC | —N/a | Yulia Karimova |
| Athletes qualified in other events | 18 | Slovenia | —N/a | Živa Dvoršak |
| Athletes qualified in other events | 18 | Serbia | —N/a | Sanja Vukašinović |
| Athletes qualified in other events | 18 | Switzerland | —N/a | Nina Christen |
| Athletes qualified in other events | 18 | Uzbekistan | —N/a | Mukhtasar Tokhirova |
| Athletes qualified in other events | 18 | United States | —N/a | Mary Tucker |
| Total | 50 | | | |

== 25 m pistol women ==
| Event | Places | Nation | Qualified athlete | Announced competitor |
|---|---|---|---|---|
| Host nation | 1 | Japan | —N/a | Chizuru Sasaki |
| 2018 World Championships | 4 | Ukraine | Olena Kostevych | Olena Kostevych |
| 2018 World Championships | 4 | ROC | Vitalina Batsarashkina | Vitalina Batsarashkina |
| 2018 World Championships | 4 | Germany | Doreen Vennekamp | Doreen Vennekamp |
| 2018 World Championships | 4 | Chinese Taipei | Tien Chia-chen | Tien Chia-chen |
| 2018 Championships of the Americas | 1 | United States | Alexis Lagan | Alexis Lagan |
| 2019 ISSF World Cup # 1 | 2 | Hungary | Veronika Major | Veronika Major |
| 2019 ISSF World Cup # 1 | 2 | China | Zhang Jingjing | Xiao Jiaruixuan |
| 2019 ISSF World Cup # 4 | 2 | Bulgaria | Maria Grozdeva | Maria Grozdeva |
| 2019 ISSF World Cup # 4 | 2 | Germany | Monika Karsch | Monika Karsch |
| 2019 ISSF World Cup # 6 | 2 | India | Rahi Sarnobat | Rahi Sarnobat |
| 2019 ISSF World Cup # 6 | 2 | Bulgaria | Antoaneta Boneva | Antoaneta Boneva |
| 2019 European Games | 1 | Switzerland | Heidi Diethelm Gerber | Heidi Diethelm Gerber |
| 2019 Pan American Games | 2 | United States | Sandra Uptagrafft | Sandra Uptagrafft |
| 2019 Pan American Games | 2 | Ecuador | Diana Durango | Diana Durango |
| 2019 ISSF World Cup # 8 | 2 | China | Xiong Yaxuan | Xiong Yaxuan |
| 2019 ISSF World Cup # 8 | 2 | South Korea | Kim Jang-mi | Kim Min-jung |
| 2019 European Championships 25m & 50m events | 2 | France | Mathilde Lamolle | Mathilde Lamolle |
| 2019 European Championships 25m & 50m events | 2 | France | Celine Goberville | Celine Goberville |
| 2019 Oceania Championships | 1 | Australia | Elena Galiabovitch | Elena Galiabovitch |
| 2019 Asian Championships | 3 | Thailand | Naphaswan Yangpaiboon | Naphaswan Yangpaiboon |
| 2019 Asian Championships | 3 | Mongolia | Otryadyn Gündegmaa | Otryadyn Gündegmaa |
| 2019 Asian Championships | 3 | ~~India~~ | ~~Chinki Yadav~~^{[f]} | — |
| 2019 Asian Championships | 3 | Thailand | Tanyaporn Prucksakorn | Tanyaporn Prucksakorn |
| 2019 African Championships | 1 | Tunisia | Olfa Charni | Olfa Charni |
| 2021 European Championships 25m & 50m events | 1 | ROC | Margarita Lomova | Margarita Lomova |
| ISSF World Olympic Rankings | 1 | Latvia | —N/a | Agate Rašmane |
| Tripartite Commission Invitation | 1 | Malta | —N/a | Eleanor Bezzina |
| Exchange of quota places | 1 | South Korea | —N/a | Kwak Jung-hye |
| Athletes qualified in other events | 16 | Albania | —N/a | Manuela Delilaj |
| Athletes qualified in other events | 16 | Austria | —N/a | Sylvia Steiner |
| Athletes qualified in other events | 16 | Belarus | —N/a | Viktoria Chaika |
| Athletes qualified in other events | 16 | Canada | —N/a | Lynda Kiejko |
| Athletes qualified in other events | 16 | Cuba | —N/a | Laina Pérez |
| Athletes qualified in other events | 16 | Ecuador | —N/a | Andrea Pérez Peña |
| Athletes qualified in other events | 16 | Georgia | —N/a | Nino Salukvadze |
| Athletes qualified in other events | 16 | Greece | —N/a | Anna Korakaki |
| Athletes qualified in other events | 16 | India | —N/a | Manu Bhaker |
| Athletes qualified in other events | 16 | Iran | —N/a | Hanieh Rostamian |
| Athletes qualified in other events | 16 | Japan | —N/a | Satoko Yamada |
| Athletes qualified in other events | 16 | Mongolia | —N/a | Tsolmonbaatariin Anudarii |
| Athletes qualified in other events | 16 | Poland | —N/a | Klaudia Breś |
| Athletes qualified in other events | 16 | Serbia | —N/a | Zorana Arunović |
| Athletes qualified in other events | 16 | Serbia | —N/a | Jasmina Milovanović |
| Athletes qualified in other events | 16 | Chinese Taipei | —N/a | Wu Chia-ying |
| Total | 44 | | | |

== 10 m air pistol women ==
| Event | Places | Nation | Qualified athlete | Announced competitor |
|---|---|---|---|---|
| 2018 World Championships | 4 | Greece | Anna Korakaki | Anna Korakaki |
| 2018 World Championships | 4 | Serbia | Zorana Arunović | Zorana Arunović |
| 2018 World Championships | 4 | South Korea | Kim Bo-mi | Kim Bo-mi |
| 2018 World Championships | 4 | China | Wang Qian | Jiang Ranxin |
| 2018 Championships of the Americas | 1 | Canada | Lynda Kiejko | Lynda Kiejko |
| 2019 ISSF World Cup # 1 | 2 | Chinese Taipei | Wu Chia-ying | Wu Chia-ying |
| 2019 ISSF World Cup # 1 | 2 | South Korea | Kim Min-jung | Choo Ga-eun |
| 2019 ISSF World Cup # 4 | 2 | Georgia | Nino Salukvadze | Nino Salukvadze |
| 2019 ISSF World Cup # 4 | 2 | Mongolia | Tsolmonbaatariin Anudarii | Tsolmonbaatariin Anudarii |
| 2019 ISSF World Cup # 6 | 2 | China | Qian Wei | Lin Yuemei |
| 2019 ISSF World Cup # 6 | 2 | India | Manu Bhaker | Manu Bhaker |
| 2019 European Games | 1 | Poland | Klaudia Breś | Klaudia Breś |
| 2019 Pan American Games | 2 | Cuba | Laina Pérez | Laina Pérez |
| 2019 Pan American Games | 2 | Ecuador | Andrea Pérez Peña | Andrea Pérez Peña |
| 2019 ISSF World Cup # 8 | 2 | India | Yashaswini Deswal | Yashaswini Deswal |
| 2019 ISSF World Cup # 8 | 2 | Serbia | Jasmina Milovanović | Jasmina Milovanović |
| 2019 Oceania Championships | 1 | Australia | Dina Aspandiyarova | Dina Aspandiyarova |
| 2019 Asian Championships | 2 | Iran | Hanieh Rostamian | Hanieh Rostamian |
| 2019 Asian Championships | 2 | Japan | Satoko Yamada | Satoko Yamada |
| 2019 African Championships | 2 | Egypt | Radwa Abdel Latif | Radwa Abdel Latif |
| 2019 African Championships | 2 | Egypt | Meskat Aly | Hala El-Gohari |
| 2020 European Championships 10m events | 1 | Austria | Sylvia Steiner | Sylvia Steiner |
| 2020 European Championships 10m events | 1 | ~~Bulgaria~~ | ~~Miroslava Mincheva~~ | — |
| 2021 European Championships 10m events | 1 | Germany | Carina Wimmer | Carina Wimmer |
| ISSF World Olympic Rankings | 1 | Belarus | —N/a | Viktoria Chaika |
| Tripartite Commission Invitation | 3 | Albania | —N/a | Manuela Delilaj |
| Tripartite Commission Invitation | 3 | Iraq | —N/a | Fatimah Al-Kaabi |
| Tripartite Commission Invitation | 3 | Yemen | —N/a | Yasameen Al-Raimi |
| Reallocation of unused quota^{[c]}^{[g]} | 4 | Armenia | —N/a | Elmira Karapetyan |
| Reallocation of unused quota^{[c]}^{[g]} | 4 | Jordan | —N/a | Asma Abu Rabee |
| Reallocation of unused quota^{[c]}^{[g]} | 4 | Moldova | —N/a | Anna Dulce |
| Reallocation of unused quota^{[c]}^{[g]} | 4 | Montenegro | —N/a | Jelena Pantović |
| Athletes qualified in other events | 22 | Australia | —N/a | Elena Galiabovitch |
| Athletes qualified in other events | 22 | Bulgaria | —N/a | Maria Grozdeva |
| Athletes qualified in other events | 22 | Bulgaria | —N/a | Antoaneta Boneva |
| Athletes qualified in other events | 22 | Ecuador | —N/a | Diana Durango |
| Athletes qualified in other events | 22 | France | —N/a | Mathilde Lamolle |
| Athletes qualified in other events | 22 | France | —N/a | Celine Goberville |
| Athletes qualified in other events | 22 | Germany | —N/a | Monika Karsch |
| Athletes qualified in other events | 22 | Hungary | —N/a | Veronika Major |
| Athletes qualified in other events | 22 | Japan | —N/a | Chizuru Sasaki |
| Athletes qualified in other events | 22 | Latvia | —N/a | Agate Rašmane |
| Athletes qualified in other events | 22 | Mongolia | —N/a | Otryadyn Gündegmaa |
| Athletes qualified in other events | 22 | Malta | —N/a | Eleanor Bezzina |
| Athletes qualified in other events | 22 | ROC | —N/a | Vitalina Batsarashkina |
| Athletes qualified in other events | 22 | ROC | —N/a | Margarita Lomova |
| Athletes qualified in other events | 22 | Switzerland | —N/a | Heidi Diethelm Gerber |
| Athletes qualified in other events | 22 | Thailand | —N/a | Tanyaporn Prucksakorn |
| Athletes qualified in other events | 22 | Thailand | —N/a | Naphaswan Yangpaiboon |
| Athletes qualified in other events | 22 | Chinese Taipei | —N/a | Tien Chia-chen |
| Athletes qualified in other events | 22 | Tunisia | —N/a | Olfa Charni |
| Athletes qualified in other events | 22 | Ukraine | —N/a | Olena Kostevych |
| Athletes qualified in other events | 22 | United States | —N/a | Alexis Lagan |
| Athletes qualified in other events | 22 | United States | —N/a | Sandra Uptagrafft |
| Total | 53 | | | |

== Trap women ==
| Event | Places | Nation | Qualified athlete | Announced competitor |
|---|---|---|---|---|
| 2018 World Championships | 4 | Slovakia | Zuzana Štefečeková | Zuzana Štefečeková |
| 2018 World Championships | 4 | China | Wang Xiaojing | Wang Xiaojing |
| 2018 World Championships | 4 | Italy | Silvana Stanco | Silvana Stanco |
| 2018 World Championships | 4 | Australia | Laetisha Scanlan | Laetisha Scanlan |
| 2018 Championships of the Americas | 2 | United States | Kayle Browning | Kayle Browning |
| 2018 Championships of the Americas | 2 | Guatemala | Adriana Ruano | Adriana Ruano |
| 2019 ISSF World Cup # 2 | 2 | Italy | Jessica Rossi | Jessica Rossi |
| 2019 ISSF World Cup # 2 | 2 | China | Deng Weiyun | Deng Weiyun |
| 2019 ISSF World Cup # 3 | 2 | France | Carole Cormenier | Carole Cormenier |
| 2019 ISSF World Cup # 3 | 2 | Great Britain | Kirsty Hegarty | Kirsty Hegarty |
| 2019 ISSF World Cup # 5 | 2 | United States | Ashley Carroll | Madelynn Bernau |
| 2019 ISSF World Cup # 5 | 2 | France | Mélanie Couzy | Mélanie Couzy |
| 2019 European Games | 1 | Spain | Fátima Gálvez | Fátima Gálvez |
| 2019 Pan American Games | 2 | Mexico | Alejandra Ramírez | Alejandra Ramírez |
| 2019 Pan American Games | 2 | Guatemala | Ana Waleska Soto | Ana Waleska Soto |
| 2019 ISSF World Cup # 7 | 2 | Australia | Penny Smith | Penny Smith |
| 2019 ISSF World Cup # 7 | 2 | Finland | Satu Mäkelä-Nummela | Satu Mäkelä-Nummela |
| 2019 European Shotgun Championships | 2 | ROC | Daria Semianova | Daria Semianova |
| 2019 European Shotgun Championships | 2 | San Marino | Alessandra Perilli | Alessandra Perilli |
| 2019 Oceania Championships | 1 | New Zealand | Natalie Rooney | Natalie Rooney |
| 2019 Asian Championships | 2 | Lebanon | Ray Bassil | Ray Bassil |
| 2019 Asian Championships | 2 | ~~Kazakhstan~~ | ~~Sarsenkul Rysbekova~~ | — |
| 2019 Asian Championships | 2 | Japan | Yukie Nakayama | Yukie Nakayama |
| 2019 African Championships | 1 | Egypt | Maggy Ashmawy | Maggy Ashmawy |
| 2021 European Shotgun Championships | 1 | ROC | Ekaterina Subbotina | Ekaterina Subbotina |
| ISSF World Olympic Rankings | 1 | Poland | —N/a | Sandra Bernal |
| Exchange of quota places ^{[c]} | 1 | Bulgaria | —N/a | Selin Ali |
| Total | 26 | | | |

== Skeet women ==
| Event | Places | Nation | Qualified athlete | Announced competitor |
|---|---|---|---|---|
| Host nation | 1 | Japan | —N/a | Naoko Ishihara |
| 2018 World Championships | 4 | United States | Caitlin Connor | Amber English |
| 2018 World Championships | 4 | United States | Kimberly Rhode | Austen Smith |
| 2018 World Championships | 4 | Slovakia | Danka Barteková | Danka Barteková |
| 2018 World Championships | 4 | ROC | Natalia Vinogradova | Natalia Vinogradova |
| 2018 Championships of the Americas | 1 | Chile | Francisca Crovetto | Francisca Crovetto |
| 2019 ISSF World Cup # 2 | 2 | New Zealand | Chloe Tipple | Chloe Tipple |
| 2019 ISSF World Cup # 2 | 2 | China | Zhang Donglian | Zhang Donglian |
| 2019 ISSF World Cup # 3 | 2 | Cyprus | Andri Eleftheriou | Andri Eleftheriou |
| 2019 ISSF World Cup # 3 | 2 | Poland | Aleksandra Jarmolińska | Aleksandra Jarmolińska |
| 2019 ISSF World Cup # 5 | 2 | Italy | Diana Bacosi | Diana Bacosi |
| 2019 ISSF World Cup # 5 | 2 | Italy | Chiara Cainero | Chiara Cainero |
| 2019 European Games | 1 | France | Lucie Anastassiou | Lucie Anastassiou |
| 2019 Pan American Games | 2 | Argentina | Melisa Gil | Melisa Gil |
| 2019 Pan American Games | 2 | Mexico | Gabriela Rodríguez | Gabriela Rodríguez |
| 2019 ISSF World Cup # 7 | 2 | China | Wei Meng | Wei Meng |
| 2019 ISSF World Cup # 7 | 2 | Germany | Nele Wißmer | Nadine Messerschmidt |
| 2019 European Shotgun Championships | 2 | Czech Republic | Barbora Šumová | Barbora Šumová |
| 2019 European Shotgun Championships | 2 | Ukraine | Iryna Malovichko | Iryna Malovichko |
| 2019 Oceania Championships | 1 | Australia | Laura Coles | Laura Coles |
| 2019 Asian Championships | 2 | ~~South Korea~~ | ~~Kim Min-ji~~ | — |
| 2019 Asian Championships | 2 | Thailand | Sutiya Jiewchaloemmit | Sutiya Jiewchaloemmit |
| 2019 Asian Championships | 2 | Thailand | Isarapa Imprasertsuk | Isarapa Imprasertsuk |
| 2019 African Championships | 1 | Morocco | Ibtissam Marirhi | Ibtissam Marirhi |
| 2021 European Shotgun Championships | 2 | ROC | Zilia Batyrshina | Zilia Batyrshina |
| 2021 European Shotgun Championships | 2 | Great Britain | Amber Hill | Amber Hill |
| ISSF World Olympic Rankings | 1 | Kazakhstan | —N/a | Zoya Kravchenko |
| Exchange of quota places | 1 | Kazakhstan | —N/a | Assem Orynbay |
| Reallocation of unused quota | 2 | Bahrain | —N/a | Maryam Hassani |
| Reallocation of unused quota | 2 | Senegal | —N/a | Chiara Costa |
| Total | 29 | | | |

== Mixed rifle team ==
| Event | Places | Nation | Qualified athletes | Announced competitors |
|---|---|---|---|---|
| 2018 World Championships | 2 | China | Yang Haoran; Zhao Ruozhu | Zhang Yu; Sheng Lihao |
| 2018 World Championships | 2 | ROC | Vladimir Maslennikov; Anastasiia Galashina | Vladimir Maslennikov; Anastasiia Galashina |
| Total | 4 | | | |

== Mixed pistol team ==
| Event | Places | Nation | Qualified athletes | Announced competitors |
|---|---|---|---|---|
| 2018 World Championships | 2 | ROC | Artem Chernousov; Vitalina Batsarashkina | Margarita Chernousova; Anton Aristarkhov |
| 2018 World Championships | 2 | China | Wang Mengyi; Wang Qian | Wang Qian; He Zhengyang |
| Total | 4 | | | |

== Mixed trap team ==
| Event | Places | Nation | Qualified athletes | Announced competitors |
|---|---|---|---|---|
| 2018 World Championships | 2 | Slovakia | Erik Varga; Zuzana Štefečeková | Marián Kovačócy; Jana Špotáková |
| 2018 World Championships | 2 | ROC | Alexey Alipov; Ekaterina Rabaya | Maxim Kabatskiy; Ekaterina Subbotina |
| Total | 4 | | | |

== See also ==
- Shooting at the 2020 Summer Paralympics – Qualification

== Notes ==
- ^{a} The International Olympic Committee (IOC) revoked two quotas originally assigned to the NOCs in the ISSF World Cup #1, as the Indian authorities denied visa entries for two Pakistani shooters and their accompanied official, following the 2019 Pulwama attack. Instead, the quotas were reassigned to each of the two World Cups in Munich and Beijing, upgrading the original number of quota places to three.
- ^{b} On March 7, 2020, the ISSF revoked the license from Egypt, originally owned by Shimaa Hashad, in the women's 10 m air rifle at the 2019 African Shooting Championships over a doping offense, giving it instead to Algeria.
- ^{c} Host nation Japan was awarded a minimum of twelve quota places in all individual shooting events for the Games. Five Japanese shooters (Endō, Akiyama, Hirata, Yamada, and Nakayama) attained a direct nomination to the Olympic team based on their performances at the Asian Championships, thereby leaving the vacancies unused for reallocation.
- ^{d} The 2019 Oceania Championships was assigned two quota places in the qualification system for the men's and women's 50 m rifle three positions. The rules stated that only shooters eligible to attain the minimum qualification score (MQS) in each event may earn a quota place. Only a single shooter in each event fulfilled the standard at the conclusion of the meet, thereby leaving the other spots unused for reallocation.
- ^{e} The 2019 African Championships was assigned one quota place in the qualification system for the men's 25 m rapid fire pistol. The rules stated that only shooters eligible to attain the minimum qualification score (MQS) in each event may earn a quota place. None of the shooters in the aforementioned event fulfilled the standard at the conclusion of the meet, thereby leaving the spot unused for reallocation.
- ^{f} Chinki Yadav secured a second quota place for India in the women's 25 m pistol; however, Manu Bhaker occupied the recipient's slot as a double starter based on her cumulative scores at the national selection trials. As a result, the NRAI decided to swap it with an additional women's 50 m rifle 3 positions spot, eventually awarded to Anjum Moudgil.
- ^{g} North Korea withdrew from the Games over the COVID-19 scare, thereby leaving the quota places unused for reallocation.
- ^{h} Keith Sanderson was originally named as the selected shooter from the United States in the men's 25 m rapid fire pistol, but later suspended following sexual harassment charges and replaced by Henry Leverett. Additionally, Nickolaus Mowrer occupied the slot as a double starter in the men's 50 m rifle 3 positions based on his cumulative scores at the Olympic trials; hence, the Americans received a second slot in the men's 25 m rapid fire pistol, subsequently awarded to Jackson Leverett.
