= Shooting at the 2020 Summer Olympics – Women's 25 metre pistol =

Olympic shooting event

Women's 25 metre pistol at the Games of the XXXII Olympiad
- Olympic shooting pictogram
- Venue: Asaka Shooting Range
- Dates: 29–30 July
- Competitors: 44 from 30 nations
- Winning score: 38

Medalists
1st place, gold medalist(s)		Vitalina Batsarashkina	ROC
2nd place, silver medalist(s)		Kim Min-jung	South Korea
3rd place, bronze medalist(s)		Xiao Jiaruixuan	China

The Women's 25 metre pistol event at the 2020 Summer Olympics took place on 29 and 30 July 2021 at the Asaka Shooting Range.

== Records ==
Prior to this competition, the existing world and Olympic records were as follows.

Qualification records
World record	Diana Iorgova (BUL)	594	Milan, Italy	31 May 1994
Olympic record	Zhang Jingjing (CHN)	592	Rio de Janeiro, Brazil	10 August 2016

Final records
World record	Veronika Major (HUN)	40	New Delhi, India	24 February 2019
Olympic record	Not established	–	–	–

== Schedule ==
All times are Japan Standard Time (UTC+9)

Date	Time	Round
Thursday, 29 July 2021	9:00	Qualification Precision
Friday, 30 July 2021	9:00	Qualification Rapid
Friday, 30 July 2021	14:00	Final

== Results ==
=== Qualification ===
Rank	Athlete	Country	Precision				Rapid				Total	Inner 10s	Notes
Rank	Athlete	Country	1	2	3	Total	1	2	3	Total	Total	Inner 10s	Notes
1	Antoaneta Kostadinova	Bulgaria	98	97	98	293	98	100	99	297	590	16	Q
2	Xiao Jiaruixuan	China	95	97	99	291	98	98	100	296	587	27	Q
3	Vitalina Batsarashkina	ROC	95	97	100	292	97	99	98	294	586	23	Q
4	Doreen Vennekamp	Germany	94	96	97	287	99	100	100	299	586	19	Q
5	Tien Chia-chen	Chinese Taipei	98	95	98	291	97	97	99	293	584	24	Q
6	Anna Korakaki	Greece	98	100	96	294	97	95	98	290	584	24	Q
7	Wu Chia-ying	Chinese Taipei	98	96	95	289	98	98	99	295	584	22	Q
8	Kim Min-jung	South Korea	97	98	96	291	99	98	96	293	584	19	Q
9	Zorana Arunović	Serbia	100	97	99	296	96	96	96	288	584	18	
10	Tanyaporn Prucksakorn	Thailand	95	98	97	290	97	96	100	293	583	19	
11	Elena Galiabovitch	Australia	94	95	98	287	99	99	98	296	583	17	
12	Mathilde Lamolle	France	94	97	97	288	97	98	99	294	582	21	
13	Andrea Pérez Peña	Ecuador	97	95	99	291	98	95	98	291	582	18	
14	Laina Pérez	Cuba	94	96	99	289	97	98	98	293	582	17	
15	Manu Bhaker	India	97	97	98	292	96	97	97	290	582	17	
16	Xiong Yaxuan	China	93	95	99	287	97	100	96	293	580	23	
17	Naphaswan Yangpaiboon	Thailand	96	95	96	287	95	99	99	293	580	17	
18	Alexis Lagan	United States	95	96	97	288	95	98	99	292	580	17	
19	Margarita Chernousova	ROC	93	94	99	286	98	97	99	294	580	15	
20	Monika Karsch	Germany	98	97	93	288	98	97	97	292	580	15	
21	Kwak Jung-hye	South Korea	95	98	95	288	96	98	97	291	579	21	
22	Heidi Diethelm Gerber	Switzerland	98	96	94	288	97	99	95	291	579	16	
23	Olena Kostevych	Ukraine	98	96	98	292	94	97	96	287	579	15	
24	Klaudia Breś	Poland	95	96	94	285	98	100	95	293	578	21	
25	Nino Salukvadze	Georgia	94	98	99	291	94	96	97	287	578	20	
26	Otryadyn Gündegmaa	Mongolia	95	95	93	283	97	100	98	295	578	17	
27	Maria Grozdeva	Bulgaria	94	98	96	288	95	99	96	290	578	14	
28	Hanieh Rostamian	Iran	96	95	98	289	100	94	94	288	577	16	
29	Sylvia Steiner	Austria	92	95	97	284	97	96	100	293	577	15	
30	Jasmina Milovanović	Serbia	93	95	99	287	95	95	98	288	575	10	
31	Céline Goberville	France	97	97	93	287	97	96	94	287	574	23	
32	Rahi Sarnobat	India	96	97	94	287	96	94	96	286	573	23	
33	Sandra Uptagrafft	United States	97	94	97	288	93	97	95	285	573	12	
34	Tsolmonbaataryn Anudari	Mongolia	93	98	96	287	96	98	91	285	572	15	
35	Veronika Major	Hungary	91	93	97	281	95	98	98	291	572	14	
36	Viktoria Chaika	Belarus	97	96	98	291	89	97	94	280	571	19	
37	Agate Rašmane	Latvia	97	95	95	287	95	92	95	282	569	19	
38	Diana Durango	Ecuador	94	95	94	283	97	99	90	286	569	15	
39	Olfa Charni	Tunisia	95	92	97	284	94	95	96	285	569	14	
40	Chizuru Sasaki	Japan	94	94	94	282	93	95	97	285	567	7	
41	Eleanor Bezzina	Malta	96	96	97	289	91	92	93	276	565	7	
42	Lynda Kiejko	Canada	99	93	89	281	94	92	97	283	564	13	
43	Satoko Yamada	Japan	92	94	93	279	90	97	97	284	563	9	
44	Manuela Delilaj	Albania	92	95	93	280	94	92	90	276	556	12	

=== Final ===
Rank	Athlete	Country	Series										S-off	Notes
Rank	Athlete	Country	1	2	3	4	5	6	7	8	9	10	S-off	Notes
1st place, gold medalist(s)	Vitalina Batsarashkina	ROC	2	5	10	15	17	22	26	30	33	38	+4	OR
2nd place, silver medalist(s)	Kim Min-jung	South Korea	4	9	14	16	18	22	26	30	34	38	+1	OR
3rd place, bronze medalist(s)	Xiao Jiaruixuan	China	3	6	9	12	15	19	23*	28*	29	—		
4	Antoaneta Kostadinova	Bulgaria	0	4	8	12	17	21	23*	28*	—			SO
5	Wu Chia-ying	Chinese Taipei	2	6	8	12	15	19	23*	—				SO
6	Anna Korakaki	Greece	1	4	8	12	15	18	—					
7	Doreen Vennekamp	Germany	4	6	7	11	14	—						
8	Tien Chia-chen	Chinese Taipei	2	4	7	10	—							
