= Shooting at the 2020 Summer Olympics – Women's 10 metre air pistol =

Olympic shooting event

Women's 10 metre air pistol at the Games of the XXXII Olympiad
- Olympic shooting pictogram
- Venue: Asaka Shooting Range
- Date: 25 July
- Competitors: 53 from 37 nations
- Winning score: 240.3

Medalists
1st place, gold medalist(s)		Vitalina Batsarashkina	ROC
2nd place, silver medalist(s)		Antoaneta Kostadinova	Bulgaria
3rd place, bronze medalist(s)		Jiang Ranxin	China

The Women's 10 meter air pistol event at the 2020 Summer Olympics took place on 25 July 2021 at the Asaka Shooting Range.

== Records ==
Prior to this competition, the existing world and Olympic records were as follows.

Qualification records
World record	Anna Korakaki (GRE)	587	Fort Benning, United States	12 May 2018
Olympic record	Not established	–	–	–

Final records
World record	Zorana Arunović (SRB)	246.9	Maribor, Slovenia	11 March 2017
Olympic record	Not established	–	–	–

== Schedule ==
All times are Japan Standard Time (UTC+9)

Date	Time	Round
Sunday, 25 July 2021	9:00	Qualification
Sunday, 25 July 2021	11:15	Final

== Results ==
=== Qualification ===
Rank	Shooter	Nation	1	2	3	4	5	6	Total	Inner 10s	Notes
1	Jiang Ranxin	China	97	97	98	98	97	100	587	23	=WR, OR, Q
2	Anna Korakaki	Greece	97	97	96	99	98	98	585	28	Q
3	Vitalina Batsarashkina	ROC	95	97	97	99	98	96	582	19	Q
4	Lin Yuemei	China	94	98	96	99	98	98	579	14	Q
5	Mathilde Lamolle	France	99	95	95	94	99	96	578	19	Q
6	Antoaneta Kostadinova	Bulgaria	96	97	94	97	96	98	578	13	Q
7	Olena Kostevych	Ukraine	96	94	98	95	98	96	577	15	Q
8	Céline Goberville	France	96	95	97	97	96	96	577	15	Q
9	Tsolmonbaataryn Anudari	Mongolia	96	97	95	97	97	94	576	22	
10	Haniyeh Rostamiyan	Iran	96	96	96	96	94	98	576	19	
11	Viktoria Chaika	Belarus	96	96	96	97	98	93	576	17	
12	Manu Bhaker	India	98	95	94	95	98	95	575	14	
13	Yashaswini Deswal	India	94	98	94	97	96	95	574	11	
14	Wu Chia-ying	Chinese Taipei	94	93	97	96	95	98	573	18	
15	Sylvia Steiner	Austria	93	94	96	97	95	98	573	16	
16	Choo Ga-eun	South Korea	95	95	93	97	97	96	573	16	
17	Zorana Arunović	Serbia	96	97	96	95	94	95	573	13	
18	Elmira Karapetyan	Armenia	94	98	95	96	92	98	573	12	
19	Agate Rašmane	Latvia	98	95	96	95	95	94	573	9	
20	Carina Wimmer	Germany	95	94	93	97	97	95	571	18	
21	Klaudia Breś	Poland	95	96	97	96	93	94	571	12	
22	Tanyaporn Prucksakorn	Thailand	95	92	97	95	95	96	570	18	
23	Satoko Yamada	Japan	92	95	93	98	97	95	570	13	
24	Kim Bo-mi	South Korea	91	94	95	97	96	97	570	12	
25	Olfa Charni	Tunisia	92	95	97	93	96	97	570	12	
26	Eleanor Bezzina	Malta	95	94	96	95	96	94	570	12	
27	Elena Galiabovitch	Australia	94	98	97	94	96	90	569	12	
28	Heidi Diethelm Gerber	Switzerland	91	95	93	96	97	97	569	8	
29	Monika Karsch	Germany	98	95	96	91	95	93	568	16	
30	Otryadyn Gündegmaa	Mongolia	96	95	95	95	92	95	568	12	
31	Nino Salukvadze	Georgia	93	92	99	95	95	93	567	15	
32	Laina Pérez	Cuba	96	95	90	95	94	97	567	11	
33	Jasmina Milovanović	Serbia	96	94	92	92	97	95	566	14	
34	Veronika Major	Hungary	92	90	97	96	97	94	566	10	
35	Margarita Chernousova	ROC	94	92	93	97	95	94	565	21	
36	Andrea Pérez Peña	Ecuador	95	93	96	95	91	95	565	11	
37	Manuela Delilaj	Albania	93	93	94	95	97	93	565	11	
38	Alexis Lagan	United States	95	90	91	95	96	93	560	15	
39	Naphaswan Yangpaiboon	Thailand	88	94	92	94	95	97	560	13	
40	Radwa Abdel Latif	Egypt	93	97	90	92	95	93	560	13	
41	Hala El-Gohari	Egypt	92	94	95	96	92	91	560	12	
42	Tien Chia-chen	Chinese Taipei	94	90	94	94	91	96	559	10	
43	Maria Grozdeva	Bulgaria	92	93	91	94	96	93	559	10	
44	Asma Abu Rabee	Jordan	92	95	94	93	91	94	559	8	
45	Diana Durango	Ecuador	90	95	94	95	93	92	559	8	
46	Dina Aspandiyarova	Australia	91	96	94	96	88	93	558	15	
47	Lynda Kiejko	Canada	94	91	93	93	92	95	558	9	
48	Anna Dulce	Moldova	94	93	92	96	90	92	557	12	
49	Sandra Uptagrafft	United States	92	92	95	94	90	94	557	10	
50	Chizuru Sasaki	Japan	88	93	96	92	92	95	556	11	
51	Fatimah Al-Kaabi	Iraq	93	94	94	92	88	95	556	10	
52	Yasameen Al-Raimi	Yemen	91	94	92	90	91	93	551	11	
53	Jelena Pantović	Montenegro	88	87	88	91	92	88	534	7	

=== Final ===
Rank	Shooter	Nation	1	2	3	4	5	6	7	8	9	Total	Notes
1st place, gold medalist(s)	Vitalina Batsarashkina	ROC	51.1	101.3	120.9	139.6	159.6	179.3	199.3	219.4	240.3	240.3	OR
2nd place, silver medalist(s)	Antoaneta Kostadinova	Bulgaria	51.1	100.7	121.1	141.5	161.4	181.8	201.3	220.3	239.4	239.4	
3rd place, bronze medalist(s)	Jiang Ranxin	China	49.7	98.6	118.7	139.7	159.4	179.5	199.4	218.0	—	218.0	
4	Olena Kostevych	Ukraine	49.5	99.2	119.7	137.8	159.4	178.4	197.6	—		197.6	
5	Lin Yuemei	China	49.8	98.7	118.5	138.7	158.0	176.6	—			176.6	
6	Anna Korakaki	Greece	49.0	96.1	116.8	137.4	157.4	—				157.4	
7	Mathilde Lamolle	France	46.7	95.4	115.6	134.6	—					134.6	
8	Céline Goberville	France	48.7	97.9	114.9	—						114.9	
