= Shooting at the 2018 Asian Games – Women's 10 metre air pistol =

Women's 10 metre air pistol at the 2018 Asian Games
- Venue: Jakabaring Shooting Range
- Dates: 24 August 2018
- Competitors: 43 from 24 nations

Medalists
gold medal	Wang Qian	China
silver medal	Kim Min-jung	South Korea
bronze medal	Heena Sidhu	India

The women's 10 metre air pistol event at the 2018 Asian Games in Palembang, Indonesia took place on 24 August at the Jakabaring International Shooting Range.

== Schedule ==
All times are Western Indonesia Time (UTC+07:00)

Date	Time	Event
Tuesday, 24 August 2018	09:00	Qualification
Tuesday, 24 August 2018	13:00	Final

== Records ==
Prior to this competition, the existing world, Asian and Games records were as follows.

Qualification
World Record	Anna Korakaki (GRE)	587	Fort Benning, United States	12 May 2018
Asian Record	Yu Ai-wen (TPE)	578	Fort Benning, United States	12 May 2018
Games Record	—	—	—	—
Final
World Record	Zorana Arunović (SRB)	246.9	Maribor, Slovenia	11 March 2017
Asian Record	Yukari Konishi (JPN)	245.3	Wako, Japan	10 December 2017
Games Record	—	—	—	—

== Results ==
=== Qualification ===
Rank	Athlete	Series						Total	Xs	Notes
Rank	Athlete	1	2	3	4	5	6	Total	Xs	Notes
1	Wang Qian (CHN)	96	97	97	95	98	97	580	19	AR
2	Kim Min-jung (KOR)	96	95	95	96	99	94	575	17	
3	Manu Bhaker (IND)	94	98	96	97	95	94	574	20	
4	Golnoush Sebghatollahi (IRI)	97	95	97	95	93	94	571	21	
5	Yu Ai-wen (TPE)	95	93	96	95	98	94	571	17	
6	Kwak Jung-hye (KOR)	96	94	97	94	95	95	571	13	
7	Heena Sidhu (IND)	94	94	96	93	99	95	571	12	
8	Bùi Thúy Thu Thủy (VIE)	94	94	95	95	97	95	570	16	
9	Teh Xiu Hong (SGP)	96	96	95	94	95	94	570	11	
10	Shing Ho Ching (HKG)	97	95	98	92	93	94	569	16	
11	Akiko Sato (JPN)	96	93	95	94	94	97	569	13	
12	Amitis Jafari (IRI)	95	95	96	92	95	95	568	16	
13	Ji Xiaojing (CHN)	90	98	97	94	94	95	568	14	
14	Tanyaporn Prucksakorn (THA)	93	97	96	95	92	95	568	13	
15	Natsara Champalat (THA)	92	93	93	95	99	95	567	10	
16	Al-Dana Al-Mubarak (QAT)	92	96	97	95	94	92	566	21	
17	Nasra Mohammed (QAT)	93	94	94	96	95	94	566	14	
18	Lê Thị Linh Chi (VIE)	91	96	95	97	94	93	566	12	
19	Zauresh Baibussinova (KAZ)	94	92	96	95	96	92	565	13	
20	Tien Chia-chen (TPE)	91	95	97	97	95	90	565	13	
21	Yuliya Komendra (KAZ)	93	94	92	94	92	97	562	17	
22	May Poe Wah (MYA)	91	93	96	93	94	93	560	14	
23	Bibiana Ng (MAS)	90	93	95	94	96	92	560	8	
24	Joseline Cheah (MAS)	93	93	90	95	96	92	559	6	
25	Shirlene Hew (SGP)	93	88	91	98	93	94	557	17	
26	Lo Ka Kay (HKG)	97	92	91	94	90	93	557	11	
27	Wafa Al-Ali (UAE)	94	95	90	91	89	97	556	16	
28	Armin Asha (BAN)	95	88	95	94	92	92	556	13	
29	Han Yong-sim (PRK)	94	89	93	95	93	92	556	11	
30	Ardina Ferdous (BAN)	91	91	92	91	97	94	556	6	
31	Tömörchödöriin Bayartsetseg (MGL)	93	95	95	89	88	94	554	9	
32	Salwa Al-Dhahri (UAE)	94	92	94	87	94	92	553	10	
33	Satoko Yamada (JPN)	92	93	92	90	89	93	549	9	
34	Wadha Al-Balushi (OMA)	87	94	88	91	92	94	546	12	
35	Otryadyn Gündegmaa (MGL)	92	94	84	92	91	92	545	8	
36	Dilorom Lagutenko (TJK)	85	94	93	91	89	91	543	9	
37	Bary Agustini Said (INA)	94	91	88	90	93	87	543	7	
38	Riusha Mohamed (MDV)	86	86	91	88	93	87	531	4	
39	Soukthasone Phimmasone (LAO)	87	86	86	91	83	92	525	8	
40	Talitha Judith Almira (INA)	87	87	78	94	90	86	522	5	
41	Viengsavanh Phommakong (LAO)	85	79	86	93	89	85	517	5	
42	Asma Hawwa (MDV)	86	72	88	91	88	85	510	0	
43	Cristina Ximenes (TLS)	73	85	77	75	75	85	470	3	

=== Final ===
Rank	Athlete	1st stage		2nd stage – Elimination							S-off	Notes
Rank	Athlete	1	2	1	2	3	4	5	6	7	S-off	Notes
1st place, gold medalist(s)	Wang Qian (CHN)	50.5	101.7	120.9	142.0	161.8	180.6	200.4	219.7	240.3		GR
2nd place, silver medalist(s)	Kim Min-jung (KOR)	50.1	100.9	121.1	140.2	159.5	180.0	199.8	219.7	237.6		
3rd place, bronze medalist(s)	Heena Sidhu (IND)	49.9	96.7	117.1	138.0	158.5	178.3	198.8	219.2			
4	Golnoush Sebghatollahi (IRI)	50.8	99.5	118.4	137.1	157.9	178.4	192.9				
5	Manu Bhaker (IND)	49.0	97.5	116.3	136.8	156.5	176.2					
6	Kwak Jung-hye (KOR)	50.5	98.2	116.2	136.4	155.6						
7	Bùi Thúy Thu Thủy (VIE)	47.0	96.9	116.6	134.0							
8	Yu Ai-wen (TPE)	48.3	96.3	114.5								
