= Shooting at the 2022 Asian Games – Women's 10 metre air pistol team =

Women's 10 metre air pistol team at the 2022 Asian Games
- Venue: Fuyang Yinhu Sports Centre
- Dates: 29 September 2023
- Competitors: 42 from 14 nations

Medalists
gold medal	China; Jiang Ranxin, Li Xue, Zhao Nan
silver medal	India; Palak Gulia, Esha Singh, Divya T. S.
bronze medal	Chinese Taipei; Liu Heng-yu, Wu Chia-ying, Yu Ai-wen

The women's 10 metre air pistol team competition at the 2022 Asian Games in Hangzhou, China was held on 29 September 2023 at Fuyang Yinhu Sports Centre.

== Schedule ==
All times are China Standard Time (UTC+08:00)

Date	Time	Event
Friday, 29 September 2023	09:00	Final

== Records ==
Prior to this competition, the existing world, Asian and Games records were as follows.

World Record	China	1739	Changwon, South Korea	4 September 2018
Asian Record	China	1739	Changwon, South Korea	4 September 2018
Games Record	—	—	—	—

== Results ==
Rank	Team	Series						Total	Xs	Notes
Rank	Team	1	2	3	4	5	6	Total	Xs	Notes
1st place, gold medalist(s)	China (CHN)	289	294	289	294	284	286	1736	66	GR
	Jiang Ranxin	96	99	99	100	93	94	581	21	
	Li Xue	97	97	94	97	93	96	574	24	
	Zhao Nan	96	98	96	97	98	96	581	21	
2nd place, silver medalist(s)	India (IND)	287	291	286	293	286	288	1731	50	
	Palak Gulia	97	97	96	95	96	96	577	23	
	Esha Singh	95	97	95	99	97	96	579	17	
	Divya T. S.	95	97	95	99	93	96	575	10	
3rd place, bronze medalist(s)	Chinese Taipei (TPE)	287	289	288	286	288	285	1723	53	
	Liu Heng-yu	97	100	94	94	96	93	574	15	
	Wu Chia-ying	95	97	97	95	97	97	578	21	
	Yu Ai-wen	95	92	97	97	95	95	571	17	
4	South Korea (KOR)	286	283	284	285	290	288	1716	50	
	Kim Bo-mi	97	96	93	94	100	95	575	16	
	Lee Si-yoon	93	92	96	94	95	97	567	12	
	Yang Ji-in	96	95	95	97	95	96	574	22	
5	Iran (IRI)	285	281	290	288	285	285	1714	45	
	Mina Ghorbani	92	92	97	97	97	95	570	14	
	Hanieh Rostamian	96	96	95	96	94	96	573	14	
	Golnoush Sebghatollahi	97	93	98	95	94	94	571	17	
6	Vietnam (VIE)	284	284	286	289	287	284	1714	45	
	Nguyễn Thị Hương	91	92	95	96	96	94	564	12	
	Nguyễn Thùy Trang	95	95	96	96	94	94	570	16	
	Trịnh Thu Vinh	98	97	95	97	97	96	580	17	
7	Thailand (THA)	291	280	283	289	286	285	1714	42	
	Surassawadee Bubphachat	97	92	92	98	94	96	569	11	
	Natsara Champalat	98	94	95	97	97	93	574	17	
	Kamonlak Saencha	96	94	96	94	95	96	571	14	
8	Mongolia (MGL)	287	274	286	286	289	285	1707	45	
	Tsolmonbaataryn Anudari	96	94	98	92	93	95	568	16	
	Tömörchödöriin Bayartsetseg	95	87	93	98	100	96	569	15	
	Enkhbatyn Khishigdelger	96	93	95	96	96	94	570	14	
9	Malaysia (MAS)	287	280	285	283	287	283	1705	48	
	Nurul Syasya Nadiah Arifin	95	95	93	95	98	93	569	16	
	Joseline Cheah	98	91	94	95	95	94	567	13	
	Bibiana Ng	94	94	98	93	94	96	569	19	
10	Japan (JPN)	280	283	283	278	285	286	1695	43	
	Chizuru Sasaki	96	93	96	92	96	96	569	17	
	Satoko Yamada	93	96	95	93	97	95	569	13	
	Mika Zaitsu	91	94	92	93	92	95	557	13	
11	Singapore (SGP)	283	282	282	286	283	278	1694	49	
	Teh Xiu Hong	94	95	94	96	98	95	572	20	
	Teh Xiu Yi	95	93	93	93	92	92	558	10	
	Teo Shun Xie	94	94	95	97	93	91	564	19	
12	Kazakhstan (KAZ)	280	281	289	279	280	278	1687	33	
	Saule Alimbek	93	90	94	93	92	87	549	9	
	Olga Axenova	92	95	97	92	93	96	565	11	
	Irina Yunusmetova	95	96	98	94	95	95	573	13	
13	Bangladesh (BAN)	282	275	278	276	279	280	1670	30	
	Fahmida Alam	93	90	95	93	91	95	557	9	
	Anjila Amjad Antu	95	93	95	95	95	94	567	15	
	Armin Asa	94	92	88	88	93	91	546	6	
14	Macau (MAC)	273	269	281	276	278	274	1651	24	
	Chao Mei Kam	92	89	92	88	94	92	547	9	
	Chao Cho Sin	90	87	95	94	91	94	551	8	
	Hoi Chi Wai	91	93	94	94	93	88	553	7	
