= Thailand at the 2020 Summer Olympics =

- IOC code: THA
- NOC: National Olympic Committee of Thailand
- Website: www.olympicthai.org (in Thai and English)

in Tokyo, Japan July 23, 2021 – August 8, 2021
- Competitors: 41 in 14 sports
- Flag bearers (opening): Naphaswan Yangpaiboon; Savate Sresthaporn
- Flag bearer (closing): Sudaporn Seesondee
- Medals Ranked 59th: Gold 1 Silver 0 Bronze 1 Total 2

Summer Olympics appearances (overview)
- 1952; 1956; 1960; 1964; 1968; 1972; 1976; 1980; 1984; 1988; 1992; 1996; 2000; 2004; 2008; 2012; 2016; 2020; 2024

Thailand competed at the 2020 Summer Olympics in Tokyo. Originally scheduled to take place from 24 July to 9 August 2020, the Games were postponed to 23 July to 8 August 2021, because of the COVID-19 pandemic. Since the nation's official debut in 1952, Thai athletes have appeared in every edition of the Summer Olympic Games, with the exception of the 1980 Summer Olympics in Moscow, because of its support of the US-led boycott.

== Medalists ==
Medal	Name	Sport	Event	Date
Gold	Panipak Wongpattanakit	Taekwondo	Women's 49 kg	24 July
Bronze	Sudaporn Seesondee	Boxing	Women's lightweight	5 August

== Competitors ==
The following is the list of number of competitors in the Games.

Sport	Men	Women	Total
Athletics	1	1	2
Badminton	2	5	7
Boxing	1	3	4
Canoeing	0	1	1
Cycling	0	2	2
Equestrian	2	1	3
Golf	2	2	4
Judo	0	1	1
Rowing	2	0	2
Sailing	1	2	3
Shooting	2	4	6
Swimming	1	1	2
Table tennis	0	2	2
Taekwondo	1	1	2
Total	15	26	41

== Athletics ==
Thai athletes further achieved the entry standards, either by qualifying time or by world ranking, in the following track and field events (up to a maximum of 3 athletes in each event):

Key

- Note–Ranks given for track events are within the athlete's heat only
- Q = Qualified for the next round
- q = Qualified for the next round as a fastest loser or, in field events, by position without achieving the qualifying target
- NR = National record
- N/A = Round not applicable for the event
- Bye = Athlete not required to compete in round

Track & road events

Athlete	Event	Final	
Athlete	Event	Result	Rank
Kieran Tuntivate	Men's 10000 m	29:01.92	23

Field events

Athlete	Event	Qualification		Final	
Athlete	Event	Distance	Position	Distance	Position
Subenrat Insaeng	Women's discus throw	59.23	18	Did not advance	

== Badminton ==
Thailand entered seven badminton players for each of the following events into the Olympic tournament based on the BWF Race to Tokyo Rankings.

Men

Athlete	Event	Group stage			Elimination	Quarterfinal	Semifinal	Final / BM	
Athlete	Event	Opposition Score	Opposition Score	Rank	Opposition Score	Opposition Score	Opposition Score	Opposition Score	Rank
Kantaphon Wangcharoen	Singles	Schäfer (GER); W (21–13, 21–15)	Penty (GBR); L (19–21, 12–21)	2	Did not advance				

Women

Athlete	Event	Group stage				Elimination	Quarterfinal	Semifinal	Final / BM	
Athlete	Event	Opposition Score	Opposition Score	Opposition Score	Rank	Opposition Score	Opposition Score	Opposition Score	Opposition Score	Rank
Ratchanok Intanon	Singles	Sárosi (HUN); W (21–5, 21–10)	Cheah (MAS); W (19–21, 21–18, 21–10)	—N/a	1 Q	Tunjung (INA); W (21–12, 21–19)	Tai T-y (TPE); L (21–14, 18–21, 18–21)	Did not advance		
Busanan Ongbamrungphan	Singles	Macías (PER); W (21–4, 21–9)	Kuuba (EST); W (21–16, 21–12)	—N/a	1 Q	An S-y (KOR); L (15–21, 15–21)	Did not advance			
Jongkolphan Kititharakul; Rawinda Prajongjai	Doubles	Chen Qc / Jia Yf (CHN); L (6–21, 10–21)	Kim S-y / Kong H-y (KOR); L (19–21, 22–24)	G Stoeva / S Stoeva (BUL); L (11–21, 21–16, 17–21)	4	Did not advance				

Mixed

Athlete	Event	Group stage				Quarterfinal	Semifinal	Final / BM	
Athlete	Event	Opposition Score	Opposition Score	Opposition Score	Rank	Opposition Score	Opposition Score	Opposition Score	Rank
Dechapol Puavaranukroh; Sapsiree Taerattanachai	Doubles	Gicquel / Delrue (FRA); W (21–9, 21–15)	Hurlburt-Yu / Wu (CAN); W (21-13, 21-6)	Ellis / Smith (GBR); L (12–21, 19–21)	2 Q	Watanabe / Higashino (JPN); L (21–15, 16–21, 14–21)	Did not advance		

== Boxing ==
Thailand entered five boxers (two men and three women) into the Olympic tournament. 2018 Asian Games and world silver medalist Sudaporn Seesondee (women's lightweight) and teenagers Thitisan Panmot (men's flyweight) and Baison Manikon (women's welterweight), with men's featherweight boxer Chatchai Butdee going to his third consecutive Games, secured the spots on the Thai squad in their respective weight divisions, either by advancing to the semifinal match or by scoring a box-off triumph, at the 2020 Asia & Oceania Qualification Tournament in Amman, Jordan. Meanwhile, Jutmas Jitpong completed the nation's boxing lineup by topping the list of eligible boxers from Asia and Oceania in the women's flyweight division of the IOC's Boxing Task Force Rankings.

Athlete	Event	Round of 32	Round of 16	Quarterfinals	Semifinals	Final	
Athlete	Event	Opposition Result	Opposition Result	Opposition Result	Opposition Result	Opposition Result	Rank
Chatchai-decha Butdee	Men's featherweight	McGrail (GBR); W 5–0	Cuello (ARG); W 4–1	Álvarez (CUB); L 2–3	Did not advance		
Jutamas Jitpong	Women's flyweight	Boualam (ALG); W 5–0	Magno (PHI); W 5–0	Çakıroğlu (TUR); L 0–5	Did not advance		
Sudaporn Seesondee	Women's lightweight	Palacios (ECU); W 5–0	Kaur (IND); W 5–0	Dubois (GBR); W 3–2	Harrington (IRL); L 2–3	Did not advance	3rd place, bronze medalist(s)
Baison Manikon	Women's welterweight	Dalgatova (ROC); W 4–1	Gu H (CHN); L 0–5	Did not advance			

== Canoeing ==
=== Sprint ===
Thailand qualified a single boat (women's C-1 200 m) for the Games by winning the gold medal at the 2021 Asian Canoe Sprint Qualification Regatta in Pattaya, marking the country's debut in the sporting discipline.

Athlete	Event	Heats		Quarterfinals		Semifinals		Final	
Athlete	Event	Time	Rank	Time	Rank	Time	Rank	Time	Rank
Orasa Thiangkathok	Women's C-1 200 m	48.262	5 QF	48.559	5	Did not advance			

Qualification Legend: FA = Qualify to final (medal); FB = Qualify to final B (non-medal)

== Cycling ==
=== Road ===
Thailand entered one rider to compete in the women's Olympic road race, by virtue of her top 100 individual finish (for women) in the UCI World Ranking.

Athlete	Event	Time	Rank
Jutatip Maneephan	Women's road race	Did not finish	

=== BMX ===
Thailand received one quota spot for women's BMX race at the Olympics, as a result of the UCI BMX Olympic Qualification List.

Athlete	Event	Quarterfinal		Semifinal		Final	
Athlete	Event	Result	Rank	Points	Rank	Result	Rank
Chutikan Kitwanitsathian	Women's race	18	6	Did not advance			

== Equestrian ==
Thailand fielded a squad of three equestrian riders for the first time into the Olympic team eventing competition by securing an outright berth as one of two top-ranked nations, not yet qualified, at the International Equestrian Federation (FEI)-designated Olympic qualifier for Group F and G (Africa, Middle East, Asia and Oceania) in Saumur, France.

=== Eventing ===
The Thai eventing team was announced on May 30, 2021.

Athlete	Horse	Event	Dressage		Cross-country			Jumping						Total	
Athlete	Horse	Event	Dressage		Cross-country			Qualifier			Final			Total	
Athlete	Horse	Event	Penalties	Rank	Penalties	Total	Rank	Penalties	Total	Rank	Penalties	Total	Rank	Penalties	Rank
Arinadtha Chavatanont	Boleybawn Prince	Individual	42.40	57	Eliminated			Did not advance							
Weerapat Pitakanonda	Carnival March	Individual	38.20	51	Eliminated			Did not advance							
Korntawat Samran	Bonero K	Individual	32.50	27	Eliminated			Did not advance							
Arinadtha Chavatanont; Weerapat Pitakanonda; Korntawat Samran	See above	Team	113.10	14	600.00	713.10	15	300.00	1013.10	15	—N/a			1013.10	15

== Golf ==
Thailand entered four (two male and two female) golfers into the Olympic tournament. Jazz Janewattananond and Gunn Charoenkul qualified directly among the top 60 eligible players for the men's event. Patty Tavatanakit and Ariya Jutanugarn also qualified for the women's event.

Athlete	Event	Round 1	Round 2	Round 3	Round 4	Total		
Athlete	Event	Score					Par	Rank
Gunn Charoenkul	Men's	71	71	71	67	280	−4	=45
Jazz Janewattananond	Men's	64	71	72	68	275	−9	=27
Ariya Jutanugarn	Women's	77	67	69	72	285	+1	=43
Patty Tavatanakit	Women's	71	71	69	68	279	−5	=23

== Judo ==
Thailand entered one female judoka into the Olympic tournament based on the International Judo Federation Olympics Individual Ranking.

Athlete	Event	Round of 32	Round of 16	Quarterfinals	Semifinals	Repechage	Final / BM	
Athlete	Event	Opposition Result	Opposition Result	Opposition Result	Opposition Result	Opposition Result	Opposition Result	Rank
Kachakorn Warasiha	Women's –52 kg	Iraoui (MAR); L 00–10	Did not advance					

== Rowing ==
Thailand qualified one boat in the men's lightweight double sculls for the Games by finishing second at the B-final and securing the last of three berths available at the 2021 FISA Asia & Oceania Olympic Qualification Regatta in Tokyo, Japan.

Athlete	Event	Heats		Repechage		Semifinals		Final	
Athlete	Event	Time	Rank	Time	Rank	Time	Rank	Time	Rank
Nawamin Deenoi; Siwakorn Wongpin	Men's lightweight double sculls	7:07.05	6 R	7:20.50	6 FC	Bye		6:56.13	18

Qualification Legend: FA=Final A (medal); FB=Final B (non-medal); FC=Final C (non-medal); FD=Final D (non-medal); FE=Final E (non-medal); FF=Final F (non-medal); SA/B=Semifinals A/B; SC/D=Semifinals C/D; SE/F=Semifinals E/F; QF=Quarterfinals; R=Repechage

== Sailing ==
Thai sailors qualified one boat in each of the following classes through the class-associated World Championships, and the continental regattas.

Athlete	Event	Race													Net points	Final rank
Athlete	Event	1	2	3	4	5	6	7	8	9	10	11	12	M*	Net points	Final rank
Natthaphong Phonoppharat	Men's RS:X	24	24	25	24	~~DNF~~	20	24	21	24	24	24	24	EL	258	24
Siripon Kaewduang-ngam	Women's RS:X	10	20	10	17	19	14	~~21~~	16	15	17	18	15	EL	171	17
Kamolwan Chanyim	Women's Laser Radial	27	32	36	32	~~38~~	36	29	36	35	34	—N/a		EL	298	38

M = Medal race; EL = Eliminated – did not advance into the medal race

== Shooting ==
Thai shooters achieved quota places for the following events by virtue of their best finishes at the 2018 ISSF World Championships, the 2019 ISSF World Cup series, and Asian Championships, as long as they obtained a minimum qualifying score (MQS) by May 31, 2020.

Athlete	Event	Qualification		Final	
Athlete	Event	Points	Rank	Points	Rank
Isaranuudom Phurihiranphat	Men's 25 m rapid fire pistol	570	20	Did not advance	
Savate Sresthaporn	Men's trap	121	12	Did not advance	
Isarapa Imprasertsuk	Women's skeet	120 (+6)	4 Q	36	4
Sutiya Jiewchaloemmit	Women's skeet	118	11	Did not advance	
Tanyaporn Prucksakorn	Women's 10 m air pistol	570	22	Did not advance	
Tanyaporn Prucksakorn	Women's 25 m pistol	583	10	Did not advance	
Naphaswan Yangpaiboon	Women's 10 m air pistol	560	39	Did not advance	
Naphaswan Yangpaiboon	Women's 25 m pistol	580	17	Did not advance	

== Swimming ==
Thailand received a universality invitation from FINA to send two top-ranked swimmers (one per gender) in their respective individual events to the Olympics, based on the FINA Points System of June 28, 2021.

Athlete	Event	Heat		Semifinal		Final	
Athlete	Event	Time	Rank	Time	Rank	Time	Rank
Navaphat Wongcharoen	Men's 100 m butterfly	54.36	50	Did not advance			
Navaphat Wongcharoen	Men's 200 m butterfly	2:01.43	36	Did not advance			
Jenjira Srisa-Ard	Women's 50 m freestyle	25.97	37	Did not advance			
Jenjira Srisa-Ard	Women's 100 m freestyle	57.42	42	Did not advance			

== Table tennis ==
Thailand entered two athletes into the table tennis competition at the Games. Rio 2016 Olympian Suthasini Sawettabut scored a repechage play-off victory to book the last of the five available places in the women's singles at the 2021 ITTF World Qualification Tournament in Doha, Qatar. Orawan Paranang topped the field of table tennis players from Southeast Asia in the round robin at the Asian Qualification Tournament, thereby joining Sawettabut on the country's roster for her maiden Games.

Athlete	Event	Preliminary	Round 1	Round 2	Round 3	Round of 16	Quarterfinals	Semifinals	Final / BM	
Athlete	Event	Opposition Result	Opposition Result	Opposition Result	Opposition Result	Opposition Result	Opposition Result	Opposition Result	Opposition Result	Rank
Orawan Paranang	Women's singles	Bye	Díaz (PUR); W 4–0	Matelová (CZE); W 4–2	Ishikawa (JPN); L 2–4	Did not advance				
Suthasini Sawettabut	Women's singles	Bye		Vega (CHI); W 4–0	Samara (ROU); W 4–1	Ito (JPN); L 0–4	Did not advance			

== Taekwondo ==
Thailand entered two athletes into the taekwondo competition at the Games. Rio 2016 bronze medalist Panipak Wongpattanakit qualified directly for the women's flyweight category (49 kg) by finishing among the top five taekwondo practitioners at the end of the WT Olympic Rankings. On the men's side, Ramnarong Sawekwiharee scored a semifinal victory in the flyweight category (58 kg) to book the remaining spot on the Thai taekwondo squad at the 2021 Asian Qualification Tournament in Amman, Jordan.

Athlete	Event	Qualification	Round of 16	Quarterfinals	Semifinals	Repechage	Final / BM	
Athlete	Event	Opposition Result	Opposition Result	Opposition Result	Opposition Result	Opposition Result	Opposition Result	Rank
Ramnarong Sawekwiharee	Men's −58 kg	—N/a	Khalil (AUS); W 23–7	Dell'Aquila (ITA); L 17–37 PTG	Did not advance	Salim (HUN); L 22–43 PTG	Did not advance	7
Panipak Wongpattanakit	Women's −49 kg	Bye	Semberg (ISR); W 29–5 PTG	Trương (VIE); W 20–11	Yamada (JPN); W 34–12 PTG	Bye	Cerezo (ESP); W 11–10	1st place, gold medalist(s)
