= Shooting at the 2020 Summer Olympics – Men's 10 metre air rifle =

Olympic shooting event

Men's 10 metre air rifle at the Games of the XXXII Olympiad
- Olympic shooting pictogram
- Venue: Asaka Shooting Range
- Dates: 25 July 2021
- Competitors: 47 from 32 nations

Medalists
1st place, gold medalist(s)		William Shaner	United States
2nd place, silver medalist(s)		Sheng Lihao	China
3rd place, bronze medalist(s)		Yang Haoran	China

The Men's 10 meter air rifle event at the 2020 Summer Olympics took place on 25 July 2021 at the Asaka Shooting Range.

== Records ==
Prior to this competition, the existing world and Olympic records were as follows:

Qualification records
World record	Péter Sidi (HUN)	633.5	Munich, Germany	25 May 2013
Olympic record	Niccolò Campriani (ITA)	630.2	Rio de Janeiro, Brazil	8 August 2016

Final records
World record	Yu Haonan (CHN)	252.8	Rio de Janeiro, Brazil	30 August 2019
Olympic record	Not established	–	–	–

== Schedule ==
All times are Japan Standard Time (UTC+9)

Date	Time	Round
Sunday, 25 July 2021	13:00	Qualification
Sunday, 25 July 2021	15:30	Final

== Results ==
=== Qualification ===
Rank	Shooter	Nation	1	2	3	4	5	6	Total	Notes
1	Yang Haoran	China	105.7	104.8	106.2	105.6	105.1	105.3	632.7	Q, OR
2	Lucas Kozeniesky	United States	104.7	105.9	105.5	103.6	105.9	105.9	631.5	Q
3	William Shaner	United States	103.0	105.6	105.8	104.7	106.2	105.5	630.8	Q
4	Patrik Jány	Slovakia	104.8	106.1	104.1	104.4	104.5	106.6	630.5	Q
5	Ömer Akgün	Turkey	104.1	105.2	102.7	105.3	106.7	105.8	629.8	Q
6	Vladimir Maslennikov	ROC	104.3	104.6	104.3	105.9	105.1	105.6	629.8	Q
7	István Péni	Hungary	104.4	105.3	104.9	106.2	105.1	103.5	629.4	Q
8	Sheng Lihao	China	104.4	105.4	105.4	105.6	103.1	105.3	629.2	Q
9	Mahyar Sedaghat	Iran	104.3	104.6	105.2	105.0	104.7	105.3	629.1	
10	Sergey Kamenskiy	ROC	104.6	104.9	104.8	103.1	105.3	106.0	628.7	
11	Henrik Larsen	Norway	104.1	104.5	105.2	105.1	104.4	104.1	627.4	
12	Nam Tae-yun	South Korea	105.0	103.3	105.4	104.8	104.3	104.5	627.2	
13	Martin Strempfl	Austria	105.1	104.1	104.7	103.8	105.2	104.1	627.0	
14	Jiří Přívratský	Czech Republic	104.2	104.9	103.6	105.4	104.1	104.6	626.8	
15	Yury Shcherbatsevich	Belarus	104.9	103.4	105.5	104.7	103.7	104.4	626.6	
16	Petar Gorša	Croatia	104.7	103.9	104.4	104.2	104.6	104.7	626.5	
17	Lu Shao-chuan	Chinese Taipei	104.5	102.5	105.0	105.5	104.6	104.2	626.3	
18	Edson Ramírez	Mexico	103.5	104.6	103.4	105.9	104.2	104.3	625.9	
19	David Hrčkulák	Czech Republic	102.2	104.6	102.9	104.7	105.4	105.9	625.7	
20	Naoya Okada	Japan	104.2	104.0	105.2	104.1	104.5	103.7	625.7	
21	Alex Hoberg	Australia	105.5	104.9	103.3	103.1	104.6	104.2	625.6	
22	Jon-Hermann Hegg	Norway	105.3	103.3	105.3	102.6	104.7	104.3	625.5	
23	Tomasz Bartnik	Poland	102.7	103.6	104.1	105.1	105.7	104.2	625.4	
24	Kim Sang-do	South Korea	103.0	104.8	104.0	104.2	105.4	103.7	625.1	
25	Miran Maričić	Croatia	101.3	105.1	104.6	104.5	104.3	105.2	625.0	
26	Deepak Kumar	India	102.9	103.8	103.7	105.2	103.8	105.3	624.7	
27	Sergey Richter	Israel	104.9	102.8	103.5	103.9	104.8	104.6	624.5	
28	Karolis Girulis	Lithuania	105.0	105.2	103.7	103.7	102.7	104.0	624.3	
29	Serhiy Kulish	Ukraine	102.3	102.8	105.6	102.3	105.6	104.9	623.5	
30	Dane Sampson	Australia	104.2	103.7	103.9	104.5	103.1	104.1	623.5	
31	Milenko Sebić	Serbia	104.5	103.3	102.7	104.3	103.5	104.9	623.2	
32	Divyansh Singh Panwar	India	102.7	103.7	103.6	104.6	104.6	103.6	622.8	
33	Alexis Eberhardt	Argentina	101.8	104.6	104.0	105.2	104.6	102.4	622.6	
34	Lorenzo Bacci	Italy	102.5	103.7	102.8	103.7	104.8	104.7	622.2	
35	Marco Suppini	Italy	104.0	104.0	102.5	104.0	103.5	104.1	622.1	
36	Yuriy Yurkov	Kazakhstan	101.7	105.3	103.4	104.4	102.8	104.3	621.9	
37	Takayuki Matsumoto	Japan	101.3	104.0	101.8	105.1	104.2	105.3	621.7	
38	Milutin Stefanović	Serbia	103.2	102.9	103.9	103.5	104.3	103.5	621.3	
39	Zalán Pekler	Hungary	103.9	104.1	104.9	103.1	102.9	102.2	621.1	
40	Oleh Tsarkov	Ukraine	102.5	101.8	102.8	104.3	105.0	104.6	621.0	
41	Abdullah Hel Baki	Bangladesh	102.8	103.4	102.9	103.8	103.8	103.1	619.8	
42	Osama El-Saeid	Egypt	102.2	105.2	102.1	101.9	104.0	103.4	618.8	
43	Julio Iemma	Venezuela	103.1	104.3	101.3	103.8	103.8	102.0	618.3	
44	Jayson Valdez	Philippines	101.3	100.5	101.6	103.6	103.5	102.1	612.6	
45	Youssef Helmy Makkar	Egypt	103.1	100.4	101.7	101.5	102.7	102.6	612.0	
46	Drilon Ibrahimi	Kosovo	101.0	102.0	102.2	100.9	102.0	100.7	608.8	
47	Mahdi Yovari	Afghanistan	102.2	99.5	97.5	101.6	102.0	98.6	601.4	

=== Final ===
Rank	Shooter	Nation	1	2	3	4	5	6	7	8	9	Total	Notes
1st place, gold medalist(s)	William Shaner	United States	52.1	105.8	127.1	147.7	168.4	189.4	210.6	231.3	251.6	251.6	OR
2nd place, silver medalist(s)	Sheng Lihao	China	52.2	105.2	125.8	146.4	167.1	187.9	208.7	229.8	250.9	250.9	
3rd place, bronze medalist(s)	Yang Haoran	China	51.9	103.6	124.4	145.1	166.2	187.5	208.1	229.4	—	229.4	
4	Ömer Akgün	Turkey	50.6	104.0	125.3	145.3	166.0	187.2	207.3	—		207.3	
5	István Péni	Hungary	52.3	103.6	124.0	144.5	165.4	186.5	—			186.5	
6	Lucas Kozeniesky	United States	51.4	102.9	123.1	144.2	165.0	—				165.0	
7	Patrik Jány	Slovakia	50.8	102.8	124.3	143.7	—					143.7	
8	Vladimir Maslennikov	ROC	50.9	102.2	123.0	—						123.0	
