= Iryna Malovichko =

Ukrainian sport shooter (born 1993)

Personal information
- Nationality: Ukrainian
- Born: 6 December 1993 (age 32)

Sport
- Sport: Shooting
Medal record
World Championships
Silver medal – second place	2023 Baku	Team mixed skeet

Iryna Malovichko (born 6 December 1993) is a Ukrainian sport shooter. She qualified to represent Ukraine at the 2020 Summer Olympics in Tokyo 2021, competing in women's skeet.

At the 2022 World Shotgun Championships Malovichko finished 5th in women's skeet, and earned first Olympic quota for Ukraine at the 2024 Olympics.
