= David Hrčkulák =

Czech sport shooter (born 1992)

Personal information
- Nationality: Czech
- Born: 11 June 1992 (age 34) Plzeň, Czechoslovakia

Sport
- Sport: Sport shooting
Medal record
World Championships
Silver medal – second place	2023 Baku	10 m air rifle team
European Championships
Silver medal – second place	2025 Châteauroux	50 m Rifle 3 Positions Team

David Hrčkulák (born 11 June 1992) is a Czech sport shooter. He competed in the men's 10 metre air rifle event at the 2020 Summer Olympics.
