= Asma Abu Rabee =

Jordanian sports shooter

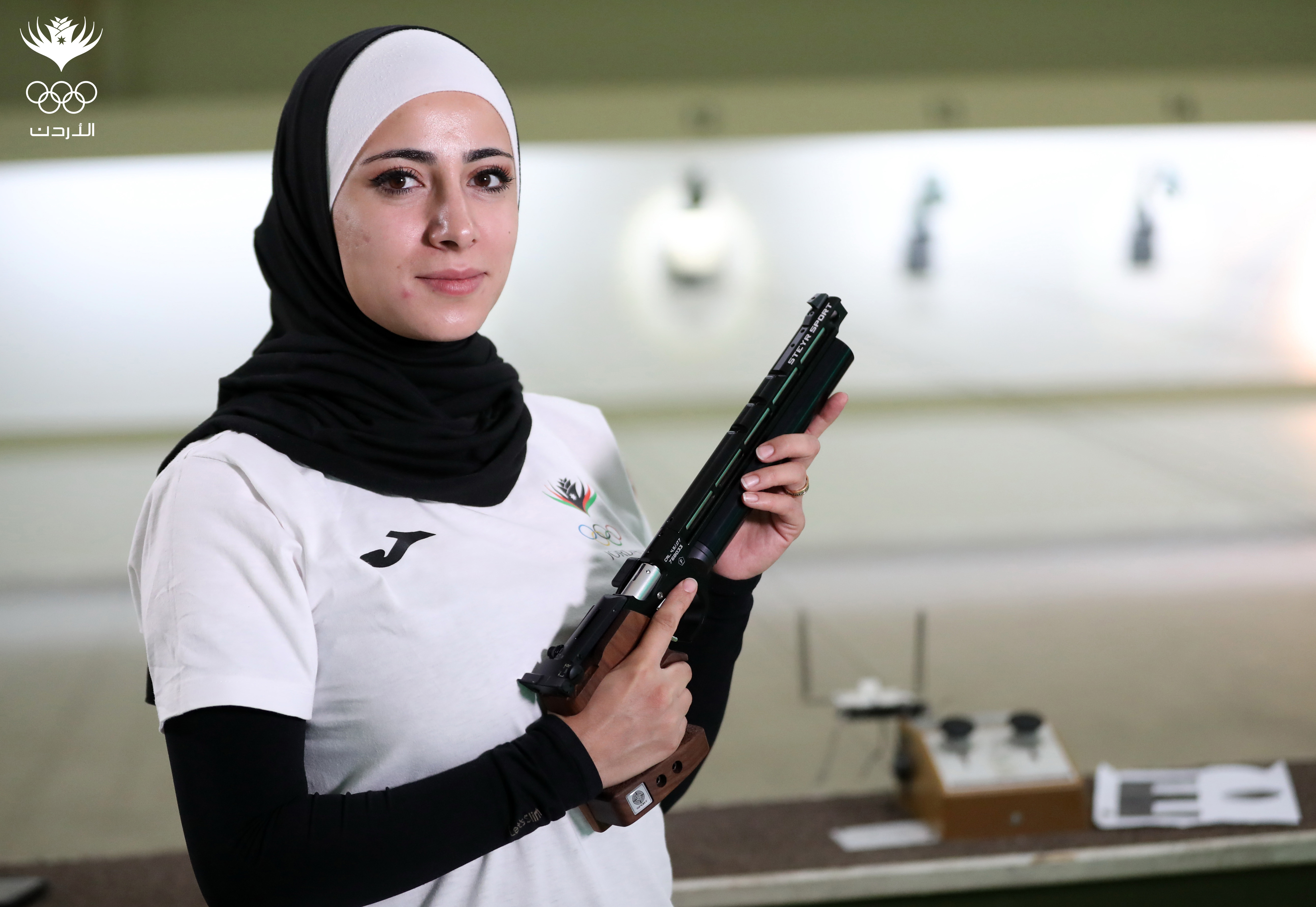

Personal information
- Nationality: Jordanian
- Born: 28 September 1991 (age 33)

Sport
- Sport: Sports shooting

Asma Abu Rabee (Arabic: أسماء أبو ربيع; born 28 September 1991) is a Jordanian sports shooter. Asma started her career in 2012 and in the same year joined the ranks of the Jordanian national team. She competed in the women's 10 metre air pistol event at the 2020 Summer Olympics.

== Qualification for the Tokyo Olympics ==
On 17 June 2021, the International Shooting Federation announced that Jordan would be granted a seat in the 10m air pistol competitions at the women's level in the upcoming Olympic Games. This was the first time since the Sydney Olympics in 2000 that a Jordanian player qualifies for the shooting competitions in the Olympic Games. Shooting was the first sport that represented Jordan in the Olympic Games during the first participation in the 1980 Moscow Olympics.

== Achievements ==
Asmaa won the first place in the Kingdom's championships from 2016 to 2019 in the 10-meter air pistol, and in 2019 she won the bronze medal in the Arab Championship and was crowned the silver of the teams in the Arab Championship twice, in 2014 and 2019.
