= Jelena Pantović =

Montenegrin sport shooter

Personal information
- Full name: Jelena Pantović
- Nationality: Montenegro
- Born: 1 April 1995 (age 31) Berane, FR Yugoslavia
- Height: 1.67 m (5 ft 6 in)
- Weight: 53 kg (117 lb)

Sport
- Sport: Shooting
- Event: 10 m air pistol (AP40)
- Club: SK Centar
- Coached by: Stanko Laban

Jelena Pantović (born April 1, 1995) is a Montenegrin sport shooter specializing in the pistol events. She was selected to compete for Montenegro at the rescheduled 2020 Summer Olympics in Tokyo, finishing last out of the 53 registered entrants in the women's 10 m air pistol. A member of Centar Sports Club in Podgorica, Pantović trains throughout her sport shooting career under the tutelage of her national head coach Stanko Laban.

Pantović qualified as the lone female shooter for the Montenegrin squad in the 10 m air pistol at the rescheduled 2020 Summer Olympics in Tokyo. She received a spare berth awarded by the International Shooting Sport Federation after attaining a minimum qualifying score of 556 at the fourth leg of the ISSF World Cup series two years earlier in Beijing, China. Pantović fired a substandard 534 points out of a possible 600, including a trio of 88 each in the initial, third, and last set, to round out the field of 53 shooters in the qualifying stage, failing to advance further to the top eight final.
