= Tommaso Chelli =

Italian sports shooter

Personal information
- Nationality: Italian
- Born: 24 September 1995 (age 29); Livorno, Italy

Sport
- Sport: Sports shooting

Tommaso Chelli (born 24 September 1995) is an Italian sports shooter. He competed in the men's 25 metre rapid fire pistol event at the 2020 Summer Olympics.
