= Lorenzo Bacci =

Italian sports shooter

Personal information
- Nationality: Italian
- Born: 14 December 1994 (age 30)

Sport
- Sport: Sports shooting

Lorenzo Bacci (born 14 December 1994) is an Italian sports shooter. He competed in the men's 10 metre air rifle event at the 2020 Summer Olympics.
