= Drilon Ibrahimi =

Kosovan sports shooter

Personal information
- Nationality: Kosovan
- Born: 2 January 1988 (age 37)

Sport
- Sport: Sports shooting

Drilon Ibrahimi (born 2 January 1988) is a Kosovan sports shooter. He competed in the men's 10 metre air rifle event at the 2020 Summer Olympics. He also competed in the men's 10 metre air rifle event at the 2022 Mediterranean Games held in Oran, Algeria.
