= Houda Chaabi =

Algerian sports shooter

Personal information
- Nationality: Algerian
- Born: 7 July 1986 (age 38); Constantine, Algeria

Sport
- Sport: Sports shooting

Houda Chaabi (born 7 July 1986) is an Algerian sports shooter. She competed in the women's 10 metre air rifle event at the 2020 Summer Olympics, coming in 39th.

She has qualified to represent Algeria at the 2024 Summer Olympics.
