= Sylvia Steiner (sport shooter) =

Austrian sport shooter (born 1982)

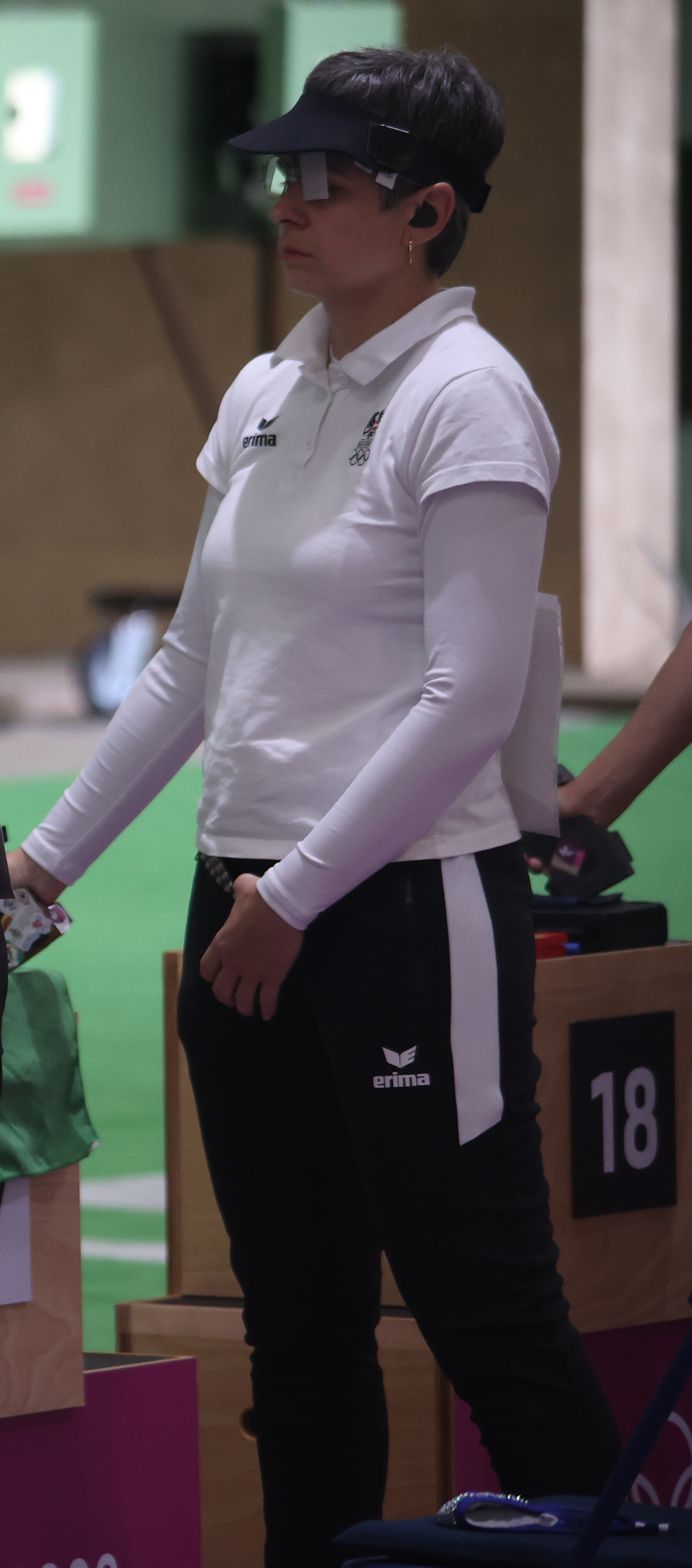
- Sylvia Steiner at 2020 Summer Olympics

Personal information
- Nationality: Austria
- Born: 7 May 1982 (age 44) Schwarzach, Austria
- Height: 1.68 m (5 ft 6 in)

Sport
- Sport: Shooting
Medal record
Women's shooting
Representing Austria
World Championships
Gold medal – first place	2022 Cairo	10 m air pistol mixed team
Gold medal – first place	2023 Baku	50 m pistol
Bronze medal – third place	2023 Baku	25 m standard pistol
Bronze medal – third place	2025 Cairo	50 m meter pistol
European Championships
Silver medal – second place	2024 Győr	10 m air pistol mixed team
Silver medal – second place	2025 Châteauroux	25 m Pistol
Bronze medal – third place	2022 Hamar	10 m air pistol

Sylvia Steiner (born 7 May 1982) is an Austrian sport shooter. Steiner competed in the 2020 Summer Olympics in Tokyo, in both the Women's 10m air pistol (finished 15th) and Women's 25m pistol (finished 29th) events.
