= Jasmina Milovanović =

Serbian sports shooter

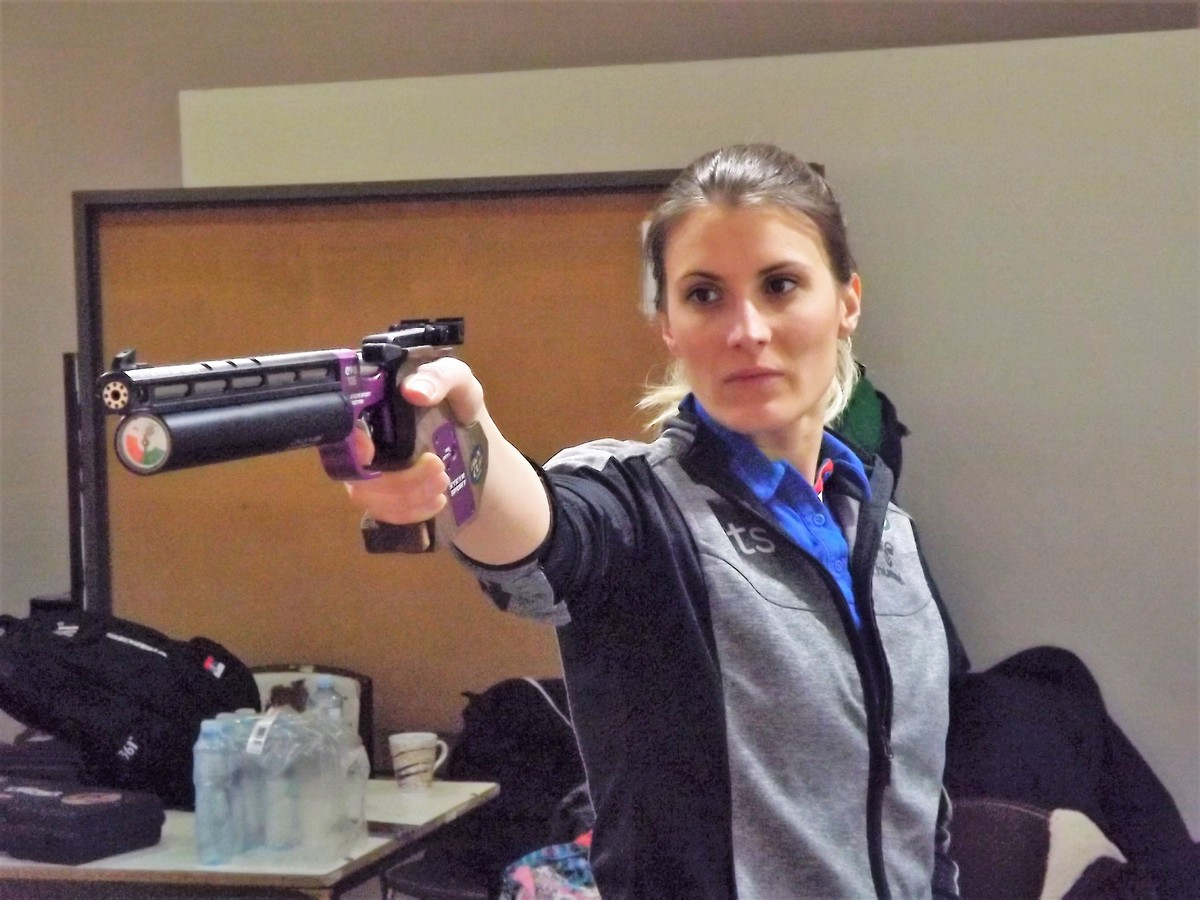

Personal information
- Nationality: Serbian
- Born: 1 March 1987 (age 39) Belgrade, Serbia, Yugoslavia

Sport
- Country: Serbia
- Sport: Sports shooting
- Event: Air pistol
Medal record
Men's shooting
Representing Serbia
ISSF World Cup
Bronze medal – third place	2019 Rio de Janeiro	10m air pistol
European Championships
Gold medal – first place	2020 Wrocław	10m air pistol team
Gold medal – first place	2017 Maribor	10m air pistol team
Bronze medal – third place	2021 Osijek	10m air pistol team

Jasmina Milovanović (Serbian Cyrillic: Јасмина Миловановић; born 1 March 1987) is a Serbian sports shooter. She competed in the women's 10 metre air pistol and women's 25 metre pistol events at the 2020 Summer Olympics. In the 10m Air Pistol event, she finished 33rd, while in the 25m Pistol event, she placed 30th with a score of 575.
