= Marco Suppini =

Italian sports shooter

Personal information
- Nationality: Italian
- Born: 13 September 1998 (age 27) Porretta Terme, Italy

Sport
- Sport: Sports shooting

Marco Suppini (born 13 September 1998) is an Italian sports shooter. He competed in the men's 10 metre air rifle event at the 2020 Summer Olympics.
