= Ekaterina Subbotina =

Russian sport shooter (born 1995)

Personal information
- Nationality: Russian
- Born: 11 February 1995 (age 30); Izhevsk, Russia

Sport
- Sport: Shooting

Ekaterina Aleksandrovna Subbotina (Russian: Екатерина Александровна Субботина; born 11 February 1995) is a Russian sport shooter. She represents Russia at the 2020 Summer Olympics in Tokyo.
