= Osama El-Saeid =

Egyptian sports shooter

Personal information
- Nationality: Egyptian
- Born: 1 March 1986 (age 39)

Sport
- Sport: Sports shooting

Osama El-Saeid (born 1 March 1986) is an Egyptian sports shooter. He competed in the men's 10 metre air rifle event at the 2020 Summer Olympics.
