= Youssef Makkar =

Egyptian sports shooter

Personal information
- Nationality: Egyptian
- Born: 8 July 1988 (age 36); Cairo, Egypt

Sport
- Sport: Sports shooting

Youssef Makkar (born 8 July 1988) is an Egyptian sports shooter. He competed in the men's 10 metre air rifle event at the 2020 Summer Olympics.
