= Mahyar Sedaghat =

Iranian sport shooter

Personal information
- Nationality: Iranian
- Born: 18 April 1996 (age 30) Tehran, Iran
- Education: Licensed architect engineer
- Height: 1.70 m (5 ft 7 in)
- Weight: 58 kg (128 lb)

Sport
- Sport: Shooting
- Event: Rifle
- Coached by: Maryam Talebi(National Team)
Medal record
Representing Iran Man's
Asian Championships
Bronze medal – third place	2019 Doha	10 m air rifle team
Asian Airgun Championships
Gold medal – first place	2013 Tehran	10m air Rifle individual Youth
Gold medal – first place	2016 Tehran	10m air Rifle Team Junior
Silver medal – second place	2013 Tehran	10m air Rifle Team Youth
Universiade
Gold medal – first place	2019 Napoli	10m air Rifle Mixed Team
Silver medal – second place	2019 Napoli	10m air Rifle Team
- Updated on 18 July 2022

Mahyar Sedaghat (Persian: مهیار صداقت; born 18 April 1996) is an Iranian sport shooter, born in Tehran. He represented Iran at the 2020 Summer Olympics in Tokyo 2021, competing in Men's 10 metre air rifle, Men's 50 metre rifle three positions and in Mixed 10 metre air rifle team.
