= Radwa Abdel Latif =

Egyptian sports shooter

Personal information
- Nationality: Egyptian
- Born: 15 October 1989 (age 35)

Sport
- Sport: Sports shooting

Radwa Abdel Latif (Arabic: رضوى عبد اللطيف, born 15 October 1989) is an Egyptian sports shooter. She competed in the women's 10 metre air pistol event at the 2020 Summer Olympics.
