= Hala El-Gohari =

Egyptian sports shooter

Personal information
- Nationality: Egyptian
- Born: 4 May 1996 (age 29)

Sport
- Sport: Sports shooting

Hala El-Gohari (born 4 May 1996) is an Egyptian sports shooter. She competed in the women's 10 metre air pistol event at the Tokyo 2020 Summer Olympics.
