= Mahdi Yovari =

Afghan sports shooter (born 1997)

Personal information
- Born: 9 June 1997 (age 28); Afghanistan
- Height: 172 cm (5 ft 8 in)

Sport
- Sport: Sports shooting

Mahdi Yovari (born 9 June 1997) is an Afghan sports shooter. He competed in the men's 10 metre air rifle event at the 2020 Summer Olympics, marking Afghanistan's Olympic debut in the sport. Yovari finished 47th in the qualification round.

== Early life and career ==
Yovari was born in Afghanistan and raised in Iran by his mother. After leaving Afghanistan at the age of 17, he sought asylum in various countries. In 2017, he left his family as a teenager and settled in Nyon, Switzerland. From 2019, he was trained by Italian shooter Niccolo Campriani as part of Campriani's Make A Mark project. Mahdi used Campriani's rifle and tripod. In 2020, he was part of the Olympic Channel's documentary series 'Taking Refuge'.
