= Lari Pesonen =

Finnish sport shooter

Personal information
- Nationality: Finnish
- Born: 28 January 1995 (age 31) Juuka, Finland

Sport
- Sport: Shooting

Lari Pesonen (born 28 January 1995) is a Finnish sport shooter, born in Juuka. He represented Finland at the 2020 Summer Olympics in Tokyo 2021, competing in men's skeet.
