= Elena Galiabovitch =

Australian sport shooter (born 1989)

Personal information
- Nationality: Australian
- Born: 13 November 1989 (age 36) Minsk, Byelorussian SSR (now Belarus), Soviet Union

Sport
- Country: Australia
- Sport: Shooting
- Event: 25m Sports Pistol
- Coached by: Vladimir Galiabovitch
Medal record
Women's shooting
Representing Australia
Commonwealth Championships
Silver medal – second place	2010 Delhi	25 m pistol pairs
Silver medal – second place	2017 Brisbane	10 m air pistol
Silver medal – second place	2017 Brisbane	25 m pistol
Commonwealth Games
Bronze medal – third place	2018 Gold Coast	10 m air pistol

Elena Galiabovitch (born 13 November 1989) is an Australian shooter and physician. She represented Australia at the 2016 Summer Olympics, 2020 Summer Olympics and 2024 Summer Olympics.

Galiabovitch competed in the 2018 Commonwealth Games and won a bronze medal in the Women's 10 metre air pistol event.

She represented Australia at the 2020 Summer Olympics in Tokyo, in both the Women's 10 metre air pistol and 25 metre Pistol events. At that same Games, in recognition of her effort as a frontline worker during the COVID-19 pandemic, Galiabovitch was selected by the International Olympic Committee as one of six athletes to carry the Olympic flag at the Games’ opening ceremony.

== Personal life ==
Elena is a Melbourne-based physician and studying a master's degree to become a urological surgeon.

Her father, Vladimir Galiabovitch, is her coach as well as other members of the national team. Vladimir and his family migrated to Australia when Elena was 4 in 1994. The sickness of Elena was the reason for Vladimir to consider migration.

Vladimir also coached Iran, Singapore, and Kuwait before returning to Australia in 2013, while his daughter, Elena, rejoins the sport in 2014, after quitting it for the first time at teen.
