= Manuela Delilaj =

Albanian sports shooter (born 1966)

Personal information
- Nationality: Albanian
- Born: 9 May 1966 (age 58)

Sport
- Sport: Sports shooting

Manuela Delilaj (born 9 May 1966) is an Albanian sports shooter. She competed in the women's 10 metre air pistol event, and Women's 50 m freestyle event, at the 2020 Summer Olympics.

She competed at the 2018 European Championships, 2019 European Championships, and 2020 European Championships.
