= Wang Qian =

Chinese sport shooter

Personal information
- Nationality: Chinese
- Born: 30 June 1993 (age 33)
- Height: 1.68 m (5 ft 6 in)
- Weight: 57 kg (126 lb)

Sport
- Country: China
- Sport: Shooting
- Event(s): AP60, SP
Medal record
World Championships
Gold medal – first place	2018 Changwon	10 m team air pistol
Silver medal – second place	2018 Changwon	Mixed 10 m air pistol
Asian Championships
Silver medal – second place	2019 Doha	10 m air pistol
Silver medal – second place	2019 Doha	10 m air pistol team

Wang Qian (Chinese: 王倩; pinyin: Wáng Qiàn; born 30 June 1993) is a Chinese sport shooter.

She participated at the 2018 ISSF World Shooting Championships.

Current world records held in 10 meter air pistol
Women	Teams	1739	China (Jiang, Wang, Ji)	September 4, 2018	Changwon (KOR)
