= Karolis Girulis =

Lithuanian sports shooter (born 1986)

Personal information
- Born: 1 November 1986 (age 39) Alytus, Lithuanian SSR, Soviet Union
- Height: 1.76 m (5 ft 9 in)
- Weight: 65 kg (143 lb)

Sport
- Country: Lithuania
- Sport: Sports shooting
Medal record
Men's sport shooting
Representing Lithuania
Baltic States Cup
Gold medal – first place	2021 Rokiškis	Air Rifle
Gold medal – first place	2021 Rokiškis	Mixed Team Rifle
Gold medal – first place	2021 Rokiškis	Rifle 3 Positions

Karolis Girulis (born 1 November 1986) is a Lithuanian sports shooter.

== Biography ==
Girulis represented Lithuania at the 2013 Summer Universiade, where he finished 6th in the 10 metre air rifle event. Girulis finished 27th at the inaugural 2015 European Games.

At the 2019 European Games, Lithuanian finished 24th in 50 metre rifle three positions event and 38th in 10 metre air rifle competition. At the 2021 European Shooting Championships Girulis reached the final in 50 metre rifle three positions event and qualified for 2020 Summer Olympics.
