= Antoaneta Kostadinova =

Bulgarian sport shooter (born 1986)

Antoaneta Boneva
Personal information
- Born: Антоанета Николаева Бонева; 17 January 1986 (age 40) Targovishte, Bulgaria

Sport
- Sport: Sports shooting
Medal record
Women's shooting
Representing Bulgaria
Olympic Games
Silver medal – second place	2020 Tokyo	10 m air pistol
European Games
Silver medal – second place	2015 Baku	25 m pistol
Silver medal – second place	2023 Kraków-Małopolska	25 m pistol
Bronze medal – third place	2019 Minsk	10 m air pistol
Bronze medal – third place	2019 Minsk	25 m pistol
Bronze medal – third place	2023 Kraków-Małopolska	10 m air pistol mixed team
European Championships
Silver medal – second place	2025 Osijek	10 m air pistol team
Silver medal – second place	2025 Châteauroux	25 m Pistol Team
Bronze medal – third place	2024 Győr	10 m air pistol team
Bronze medal – third place	2025 Châteauroux	25 m Pistol
Bronze medal – third place	2026 Yerevan	10 m air pistol
Bronze medal – third place	2026 Yerevan	10 m air pistol team

Antoaneta Kostadinova, née Boneva (Bulgarian: Антоанета Костадинова (Бонева); born 17 January 1986) is a Bulgarian sport shooter. At the 2012 Summer Olympics, she competed in the Women's 10 metre air pistol and the women's 25 metre pistol. At the 2020 Summer Olympics, she won a silver medal in the Women's 10 metre air pistol. In December 2021, Kostadinova came third in the Bulgarian Sportsperson of the Year ranking, earning 995 points.
