= Ömer Akgün =

Turkish sport shooter (born 1982)

Personal information
- Nationality: Turkish
- Born: 15 February 1982 (age 44) Dicle, Diyarbakır, Turkey

Sport
- Country: Turkey
- Sport: Air rifle
- Event: 10 m air rifle
- Club: Diyarbakır Tennis and Shooting Club
Medal record
Men's Shooting
Representing Turkey
Islamic Solidarity Games
Gold medal – first place	2017 Baku	10 m air rifle
Bronze medal – third place	2017 Baku	10 m air rifle Mixed

Ömer Akgün (born 15 February 1982) is a Turkish sport shooter specialized in 10 m air rifle event.

Ömer Akgün was born into a family with 13 champion sport shooters in Dicle district of Diyarbakır Province, southeastern Turkey on 1 January 1982.

Impressed by his older brother, Akgün started shooting sport in 1996. He is a member of Diyarbakır Tennis and Shooting Club. He won the gold medal and the bronze medal in the Mixed event at the 2017 Islamic Solidarity Games in Baku, Azerbaijan. He competed at the 2018 Mediterranean Games in Tarragona, Spain. He set a national record with 630.1 points at the 2020 European Championship 10m in Wrocław, Poland, and obtained a quota for the 2020 Summer Olympics.
