= Isaranuudom Phurihiranphat =

Thai sports shooter (born 2004)

Personal information
- Nationality: Thai
- Born: 26 June 2004 (age 20); Nakhon Ratchasima, Thailand

Sport
- Sport: Sports shooting

Isaranuudom Phurihiranphat (born 26 June 2004) is a Thai sports shooter. He competed in the men's 25 metre rapid fire pistol event at the 2020 Summer Olympics.
