= Kim Min-jung (sport shooter) =

South Korean sport shooter

Personal information
- Nationality: South Korean
- Born: 26 March 1997 (age 29) Seoul, South Korea
- Height: 1.61 m (5 ft 3 in)
- Weight: 53 kg (117 lb)

Sport
- Country: South Korea
- Sport: Shooting
- Event(s): 10 m air pistol (AP40); 25 m pistol (SP)
- Club: KB Kookmin Bank
- Coached by: Son Sang-won
Medal record
Women's shooting
Representing South Korea
Olympic Games
Silver medal – second place	2020 Tokyo	25 m pistol
World Championships
Silver medal – second place	2018 Changwon	10 m team air pistol
Silver medal – second place	2018 Changwon	25 m team pistol
Asian Games
Silver medal – second place	2018 Palembang	10 m air pistol mixed team
Bronze medal – third place	2018 Palembang	25 m pistol
Asian Championships
Gold medal – first place	2019 Doha	10 m air pistol team
Gold medal – first place	2019 Doha	25 m pistol team
Summer Youth Olympics
Bronze medal – third place	2014 Nanjing	AP40

Korean name
- Hangul: 김민정
- RR: Gim Minjeong
- MR: Kim Minjŏng

Kim Min-jung (Korean: 김민정; born 26 March 1997) is a South Korean sport shooter. She won a bronze medal in the girls' 10 m air pistol shooting at the 2014 Summer Youth Olympics in Nanjing, China, and currently trains as a member of the shooting squad under KB Kookmin Bank.

Kim stepped into the shooting scene, as a 17-year-old, at the 2014 Summer Youth Olympics in Nanjing, China. There, she left the three-way duel with a startling 175.4 to take home the bronze medal in the girls' 10 m air pistol, falling short to Poland's Agata Nowak and Russia's Margarita Lomova by almost a single-point margin.

At the 2016 Summer Olympics in Rio de Janeiro, Kim is slated to compete on her first senior South Korean team in the women's 10 m air pistol. Leading up to the Games, she collected a cumulative total of 1,923 points to earn one of the two available slots at the Olympic team trials for airgun in Naju.

Kim won the silver medal in the women's 25 metre pistol event at the 2020 Summer Olympics held in Tokyo, Japan.
