= Savate Sresthaporn =

Thai sports shooter (born 1963)

Personal information
- Nationality: Thai
- Born: 13 April 1963 (age 62); Bangkok, Thailand

Sport
- Sport: Sports shooting

Savate Sresthaporn (Thai: เศวต เศรษฐาภรณ์; born 13 April 1963) is a Thai sports shooter. He competed in the men's trap event at the 2020 Summer Olympics.
