= Tsolmonbaataryn Anudari =

Mongolian sports shooter (born 1997)

Personal information
- Nationality: Mongolian
- Born: 9 July 1997 (age 28)

Sport
- Sport: Sports shooting
Medal record
World Championships
Bronze medal – third place	2023 Baku	50 m pistol team

Tsolmonbaataryn Anudari (Mongolian: Цолмонбаатарын Анударь; born 9 July 1997) is a Mongolian sports shooter. She competed in the women's 10 metre air pistol event at the 2020 Summer Olympics.
