= Naphaswan Yangpaiboon =

Thai sport shooter (born 1988)

Personal information
- Nationality: Thai
- Born: 12 May 1988 (age 38) Chiang Mai, Thailand

Sport
- Sport: Shooting
Medal record
Women's shooting
Representing Thailand
ISSF World Cup
Gold medal – first place	2017 New Delhi	25 metre pistol
Silver medal – second place	2014 Beijing	25 metre pistol
Bronze medal – third place	2016 Munich	25 metre pistol
Asian Games
Silver medal – second place	2018 Jakarta–Palembang	25 metre pistol
Asian Championships
Gold medal – first place	2019 Doha	25 metre pistol
Bronze medal – third place	2019 Doha	25 metre pistol team
Southeast Asian Games
Gold medal – first place	2015 Singapore	25 m pistol team
Bronze medal – third place	2013 Myanmar	25 m pistol team

Naphaswan Yangpaiboon (born 12 May 1988, Chiang Mai) is a Thai sport shooter. At the 2012 Summer Olympics, she competed in the Women's 10 metre air pistol and the women's 25 metre pistol. She lost to Rahi Sarnobat in the finals of the women's 25 metre pistol at the 2018 Asian Games and bagged a silver.

Olympic Games
Preceded by Ratchanok Intanon	Flagbearer for Thailand; Tokyo 2020 (with Savate Sresthaporn)	Succeeded by Incumbent
