= Andrea Pérez Peña =

Ecuadorian sports shooter (born 1990)

Personal information
- Born: 7 April 1990 (age 36) Guayaquil, Ecuador

Sport
- Country: Ecuador
- Sport: Shooting
Medal record
Women's shooting
Representing Ecuador
Pan American Games
Silver medal – second place	2019 Lima	10 m air pistol
Bronze medal – third place	2019 Lima	25 m pistol
Bronze medal – third place	2019 Lima	Mixed 10 m air pistol

Andrea Marina Pérez Peña (born 7 April 1990) is an Ecuadorian sport shooter. She placed 37th in the women's 25 metre pistol event at the 2016 Summer Olympics. She competed at the 2020 Summer Olympics.
