= Chizuru Sasaki =

Japanese sports shooter

Personal information
- Nationality: Japanese
- Born: 2 December 1985 (age 40) Morioka, Japan

Sport
- Sport: Sports shooting

Chizuru Sasaki (Kanji:佐々木 千鶴, born 2 December 1985) is a Japanese sports shooter. She competed in the women's 10 metre air pistol event at the 2020 Summer Olympics.
