= Mathilde Lamolle =

French sport shooter (born 1997)

Personal information
- Nationality: French
- Born: 7 April 1997 (age 29)
- Height: 1.67 m (5 ft 6 in)
- Weight: 58 kg (128 lb)

Sport
- Country: France
- Sport: Shooting
Medal record
Women's shooting
Representing France
World Championships
Gold medal – first place	2014 Granada	25m pistol junior
Bronze medal – third place	2025 Cairo	25 meter pistol team
European Games
Silver medal – second place	2023 Kraków-Małopolska	10 m air pistol team
European Shooting Championships
Gold medal – first place	2021 Osijek	25m pistol
Gold medal – first place	2016 Gyor	10m air pistol junior
Gold medal – first place	2025 Châteauroux	25 m Pistol Team
Bronze medal – third place	2022 Hamar	10m air pistol team
Bronze medal – third place	2019 Bologna	25m pistol
Bronze medal – third place	2016 Tallinn	25m pistol junior
Bronze medal – third place	2015 Maribor	25m pistol junior

Mathilde Lamolle (born 7 April 1997) is a French shooter. She competed at the 2016 Summer Olympics. She was Junior World Champion and European Champion in the 25m pistol event.

== Career ==
Lamolle won the Junior Women's 25 m pistol event at the 2014 World Championships in Granada.

At the 2021 European Championships in Osijek, Lamolle won the women's 25 m pistol to become European Champion.
