= Satoko Yamada =

Japanese sports shooter

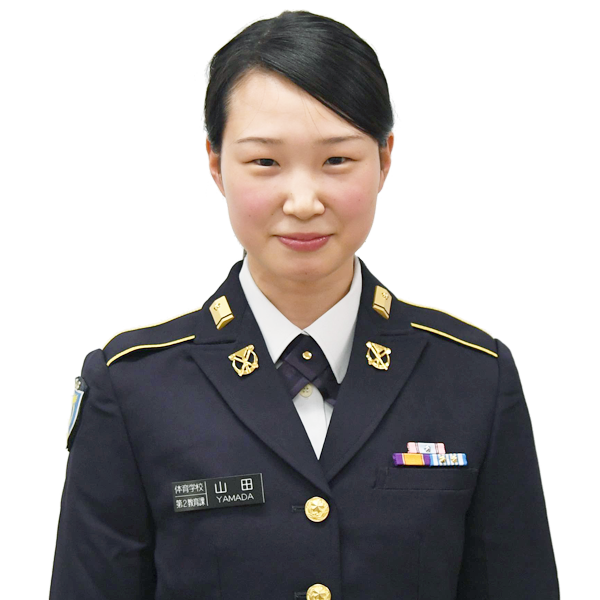
- 2021

Personal information
- Nationality: Japanese
- Born: 26 February 1995 (age 30); Kōka, Japan
- Height: 162 cm (5 ft 4 in)
- Weight: 53 kg (117 lb)

Sport
- Sport: Sports shooting

Satoko Yamada (Kanji:山田 聡子, born 26 February 1995) is a Japanese sports shooter. She competed in the women's 10 metre air pistol event at the 2020 Summer Olympics.
