= Tien Chia-chen =

Taiwanese sport shooter

Medal record

Women's shooting

Representing Chinese Taipei

Asian Games
Bronze medal – third place	2026 Aichi–Nagoya	25 m air pistol team

Asian Championships
Silver medal – second place	2015 Kuwait City	10 m air pistol team
Silver medal – second place	2026 New Delhi	25 m air pistol Team
Bronze medal – third place	2023 Changwon	25 m pistol team

Tien Chia-chen (田家榛; born December 20, 1983) is a Taiwanese female sport shooter. At the 2012 Summer Olympics, she competed in the Women's 10 metre air pistol, finishing in 27th, and the women's 25 metre pistol, finishing 16th. She came in second place in the women's 10 metre air pistol at the 2016 Asian Olympic Shooting Qualifying Tournament.
