= Wu Chia-ying =

Taiwanese sport shooter

Medal record

Women's shooting

Representing Chinese Taipei

Asian Championships
Silver medal – second place	2015 Kuwait City	10 m air pistol team
Silver medal – second place	2023 Changwon	10 m air pistol team
Silver medal – second place	2026 New Delhi	25 m air pistol Team
Bronze medal – third place	2023 Changwon	25 m pistol team

Wu Chia-ying (born October 25, 1992) is a Taiwanese sport shooter. She is currently playing for the Chinese Taipei team at the 2020 Tokyo Olympic Games. She competed at the 2016 Summer Olympics in the women's 25 metre pistol event, in which she placed 27th, and the women's 10 metre air pistol event, in which she placed 19th.
