= Shooting at the 2014 Asian Games – Women's 25 metre pistol =

Women's 25 metre pistol at the 2014 Asian Games
- Venue: Ongnyeon International Shooting Range
- Dates: 22 September 2014
- Competitors: 44 from 18 nations

Medalists
gold medal	Zhang Jingjing	China
silver medal	Chen Ying	China
bronze medal	Otryadyn Gündegmaa	Mongolia

The women's 25 metre pistol competition at the 2014 Asian Games in Incheon, South Korea was held on 22 September at the Ongnyeon International Shooting Range.

== Schedule ==
All times are Korea Standard Time (UTC+09:00)

Date	Time	Event
Monday, 22 September 2014	09:00	Qualification
Monday, 22 September 2014	14:30	Semifinal
Monday, 22 September 2014	14:30	Finals

== Records ==
Prior to this competition, the existing world, Asian and Games records were as follows.

World Record	Diana Iorgova (BUL)	594	Milan, Italy	31 May 1994
Asian Record	Tao Luna (CHN)	594	Munich, Germany	23 August 2002
Games Record	Chen Ying (CHN)	592	Busan, South Korea	4 October 2002

== Results ==
=== Qualification ===
Rank	Athlete	Precision			Rapid			Total	Xs	Notes
Rank	Athlete	1	2	3	1	2	3	Total	Xs	Notes
1	Zhang Jingjing (CHN)	94	99	99	100	99	100	591	21	
2	Otryadyn Gündegmaa (MGL)	96	99	94	100	99	99	587	26	
3	Kim Jang-mi (KOR)	97	95	97	98	99	98	584	19	
4	Naphaswan Yangpaiboon (THA)	95	97	97	100	96	98	583	22	
5	Kwak Jung-hye (KOR)	95	100	95	96	97	100	583	20	
6	Lee Jung-eun (KOR)	98	96	96	96	95	100	581	9	
7	Chen Ying (CHN)	93	97	95	97	98	100	580	18	
8	Rahi Sarnobat (IND)	96	96	97	98	97	96	580	18	
9	Lê Thị Hoàng Ngọc (VIE)	95	96	99	95	99	93	577	16	
10	Anisa Sayyed (IND)	92	96	95	97	98	99	577	12	
11	Zhou Qingyuan (CHN)	97	95	94	96	98	96	576	18	
12	Triệu Thị Hoa Hồng (VIE)	96	94	94	98	99	95	576	16	
13	Zauresh Baibussinova (KAZ)	97	91	97	97	98	96	576	15	
14	Yuliya Komendra (KAZ)	93	97	96	99	94	96	575	11	
15	Kanyakorn Hirunphoem (THA)	96	94	99	93	95	96	573	15	
16	Teh Xiu Hong (SIN)	99	98	97	94	93	91	572	19	
17	Heena Sidhu (IND)	96	96	99	92	93	96	572	15	
18	Teo Shun Xie (SIN)	92	96	97	98	94	94	571	17	
19	Yuliya Drishlyuk (KAZ)	92	94	94	98	98	95	571	16	
20	Kinuko Sato (JPN)	93	98	96	93	96	95	571	14	
21	Nicole Tan (SIN)	91	95	93	97	97	98	571	12	
22	Maryam Soltani (IRI)	95	93	97	95	95	95	570	17	
23	Tömörchödöriin Bayartsetseg (MGL)	95	92	95	96	93	99	570	13	
24	Tsogbadrakhyn Mönkhzul (MGL)	94	96	94	94	96	96	570	12	
25	Alia Sazana Azahari (MAS)	95	91	95	97	95	96	569	17	
26	Yoko Inada (JPN)	97	94	97	91	96	93	568	11	
27	Pattarasuda Sowsanga (THA)	96	93	97	94	93	95	568	10	
28	Yukari Konishi (JPN)	93	93	98	94	89	100	567	11	
29	Wadha Al-Balushi (OMA)	93	93	94	91	97	98	566	17	
30	Nguyễn Thùy Dung (VIE)	95	92	95	96	94	92	564	8	
31	Tien Chia-chen (TPE)	93	97	93	85	97	94	559	11	
32	Nasra Mohammed (QAT)	91	89	93	91	95	94	553	9	
33	Lubna Abdulaziz Ahmed (BRN)	90	94	97	88	84	94	547	12	
34	Elham Harijani (IRI)	97	96	93	79	91	90	546	11	
35	Aminath Adheela (MDV)	87	97	94	92	86	90	546	10	
36	Souad Al-Khater (QAT)	91	85	93	90	95	91	545	7	
37	Al-Dana Al-Mubarak (QAT)	87	86	91	92	96	91	543	7	
38	Sarina Gharabat (IRI)	94	90	91	88	83	89	535	9	
39	Eman Boland (KUW)	90	94	96	87	87	81	535	6	
40	Cheong Lok Si (MAC)	91	83	90	90	95	85	534	6	
41	Vong Iok In (MAC)	86	94	88	82	86	91	527	4	
42	Riusha Mohamed (MDV)	92	83	88	87	91	81	522	4	
43	Asraa Bahman (KUW)	84	94	85	90	79	72	504	5	
44	Chao Wa Kuan (MAC)	82	88	87	71	88	83	499	5	

=== Semifinal ===
Rank	Athlete	Series					Total	S-off
Rank	Athlete	1	2	3	4	5	Total	S-off
1	Zhang Jingjing (CHN)	2	4	4	5	4	19	
2	Chen Ying (CHN)	2	4	4	4	4	18	4
3	Otryadyn Gündegmaa (MGL)	4	3	4	5	2	18	0
4	Kwak Jung-hye (KOR)	3	5	5	3	1	17	
5	Kim Jang-mi (KOR)	2	3	3	4	4	16	
6	Lee Jung-eun (KOR)	2	2	3	3	5	15	
7	Rahi Sarnobat (IND)	1	4	4	2	4	15	
8	Naphaswan Yangpaiboon (THA)	4	3	2	3	1	13	

=== Finals ===
==== Bronze medal match ====
Athlete	Score	1	2	3	4	5
Otryadyn Gündegmaa (MGL)	7	2	0	1	2	2
Kwak Jung-hye (KOR)	3	0	2	1	0	0

==== Gold medal match ====
Athlete	Score	1	2	3	4	5	6
Zhang Jingjing (CHN)	7	2	0	1	2	1	1
Chen Ying (CHN)	5	0	2	1	0	1	1
