= Shooting at the 2014 Asian Games – Women's 25 metre pistol team =

Women's 25 metre pistol team at the 2014 Asian Games
- Venue: Ongnyeon International Shooting Range
- Dates: 22 September 2014
- Competitors: 36 from 12 nations

Medalists
gold medal	South Korea; Kim Jang-mi, Kwak Jung-hye, Lee Jung-eun
silver medal	China; Chen Ying, Zhang Jingjing, Zhou Qingyuan
bronze medal	India; Rahi Sarnobat, Anisa Sayyed, Heena Sidhu

The women's 25 metre pistol team competition at the 2014 Asian Games in Incheon, South Korea was held on 22 September at the Ongnyeon International Shooting Range.

== Schedule ==
All times are Korea Standard Time (UTC+09:00)

Date	Time	Event
Monday, 22 September 2014	09:00	Final

== Records ==
Prior to this competition, the existing world, Asian and Games records were as follows.

World Record	China	1768	Busan, South Korea	4 October 2002
Asian Record	China	1768	Busan, South Korea	4 October 2002
Games Record	China	1768	Busan, South Korea	4 October 2002

== Results ==
Rank	Team	Precision			Rapid			Total	Xs	Notes
Rank	Team	1	2	3	1	2	3	Total	Xs	Notes
1st place, gold medalist(s)	South Korea (KOR)	290	291	288	290	291	298	1748	48	
	Kim Jang-mi	97	95	97	98	99	98	584	19	
	Kwak Jung-hye	95	100	95	96	97	100	583	20	
	Lee Jung-eun	98	96	96	96	95	100	581	9	
2nd place, silver medalist(s)	China (CHN)	284	291	288	293	295	296	1747	57	
	Chen Ying	93	97	95	97	98	100	580	18	
	Zhang Jingjing	94	99	99	100	99	100	591	21	
	Zhou Qingyuan	97	95	94	96	98	96	576	18	
3rd place, bronze medalist(s)	India (IND)	284	288	291	287	288	291	1729	45	
	Rahi Sarnobat	96	96	97	98	97	96	580	18	
	Anisa Sayyed	92	96	95	97	98	99	577	12	
	Heena Sidhu	96	96	99	92	93	96	572	15	
4	Mongolia (MGL)	285	287	283	290	288	294	1727	51	
	Tömörchödöriin Bayartsetseg	95	92	95	96	93	99	570	13	
	Otryadyn Gündegmaa	96	99	94	100	99	99	587	26	
	Tsogbadrakhyn Mönkhzul	94	96	94	94	96	96	570	12	
5	Thailand (THA)	287	284	293	287	284	289	1724	47	
	Kanyakorn Hirunphoem	96	94	99	93	95	96	573	15	
	Pattarasuda Sowsanga	96	93	97	94	93	95	568	10	
	Naphaswan Yangpaiboon	95	97	97	100	96	98	583	22	
6	Kazakhstan (KAZ)	282	282	287	294	290	287	1722	42	
	Zauresh Baibussinova	97	91	97	97	98	96	576	15	
	Yuliya Drishlyuk	92	94	94	98	98	95	571	16	
	Yuliya Komendra	93	97	96	99	94	96	575	11	
7	Vietnam (VIE)	286	282	288	289	292	280	1717	40	
	Lê Thị Hoàng Ngọc	95	96	99	95	99	93	577	16	
	Nguyễn Thùy Dung	95	92	95	96	94	92	564	8	
	Triệu Thị Hoa Hồng	96	94	94	98	99	95	576	16	
8	Singapore (SIN)	282	289	287	289	284	283	1714	48	
	Nicole Tan	91	95	93	97	97	98	571	12	
	Teh Xiu Hong	99	98	97	94	93	91	572	19	
	Teo Shun Xie	92	96	97	98	94	94	571	17	
9	Japan (JPN)	283	285	291	278	281	288	1706	36	
	Yoko Inada	97	94	97	91	96	93	568	11	
	Yukari Konishi	93	93	98	94	89	100	567	11	
	Kinuko Sato	93	98	96	93	96	95	571	14	
10	Iran (IRI)	286	279	281	262	269	274	1651	37	
	Sarina Gharabat	94	90	91	88	83	89	535	9	
	Elham Harijani	97	96	93	79	91	90	546	11	
	Maryam Soltani	95	93	97	95	95	95	570	17	
11	Qatar (QAT)	269	260	277	273	286	276	1641	23	
	Souad Al-Khater	91	85	93	90	95	91	545	7	
	Al-Dana Al-Mubarak	87	86	91	92	96	91	543	7	
	Nasra Mohammed	91	89	93	91	95	94	553	9	
12	Macau (MAC)	259	265	265	243	269	259	1560	15	
	Chao Wa Kuan	82	88	87	71	88	83	499	5	
	Cheong Lok Si	91	83	90	90	95	85	534	6	
	Vong Iok In	86	94	88	82	86	91	527	4	
