= Shooting at the 2014 Commonwealth Games – Women's 25 metre pistol =

Shooting – Women's 25 metre pistol at the 2014 Commonwealth Games
- Venue: Barry Buddon Shooting Centre
- Dates: 26 July 2014
- Competitors: 27 from 16 nations

Medalists
gold medal	Rahi Sarnobat	India
silver medal	Anisa Sayyed	India
bronze medal	Lalita Yauhleuskaya	Australia

The Women's 25 metre air pistol took place on 26 July 2014 at the Barry Buddon Shooting Centre. There was a qualification in which the top 8 athletes qualified for the finals.

== Results ==
=== Qualification ===
Rank	Name	Rapid	Precision	Total	Notes
1	Teo Shun Xie (SIN)	289	293	582	Q
2	Lalita Yauhleuskaya (AUS)	294	284	578	Q
3	Alia Sazana Azahari (MAS)	295	282	577	Q
4	Rahi Sarnobat (IND)	293	282	575	Q
5	Bibiana Ng Pei Chin (MAS)	286	283	569	Q
6	Geraldine Buckley (ENG)	287	282	569	Q
7	Anisa Sayyed (IND)	282	286	568	Q
8	Hayley Chapman (AUS)	286	281	567	Q
9	Aminath Adheela (MDV)	287	276	563	
10	Victoria Mullin (ENG)	279	283	562	
11	Ruwini Abeymanna (SRI)	280	280	560	
12	Tazeem Akhtar Abbasi (PAK)	283	275	558	
13	Dorothy Ludwig (CAN)	275	280	555	
14	Ling Chiao Nicole Tan (SIN)	271	283	554	
15	Nicola Holmes (JER)	267	284	551	
16	Coral Kennerley (WAL)	268	278	546	
17	Lynda Kiejko (CAN)	272	273	545	
18	Tara Laine (GUE)	271	267	538	
19	Nikki Trebert (GUE)	265	271	536	
20	Amali Kulathunge (SRI)	269	265	534	
21	Riusha Mohamed (MDV)	263	262	262	
22	Shawnee Bourner (WAL)	274	245	519	
23	Caroline Brownlie (SCO)	251	262	513	
24	Jacqui Grundy (NFI)	251	259	510	
25	Denise Reeves (NFI)	236	257	493	
−	Nora Ekpenyong (NGR)	-	-	−	DNS
−	Ada Ikevude (NGR)	-	-	−	DNS

=== Semi-finals ===
Rank	Name	1	2	3	4	5	Points	Shot-off	Notes
1	Rahi Sarnobat (IND)	4	5	9	11	16	16		QG
2	Anisa Sayyed (IND)	4	7	8	11	14	14		QG
3	Alia Sazana Azahari (MAS)	3	4	6	9	13	13	(1)5	QB
4	Lalita Yauhleuskaya (AUS)	3	6	8	11	13	13	(1)4	QB
5	Teo Shun Xie (SIN)	3	4	6	10	13	13	(1)1	
6	Hayley Chapman (AUS)	1	4	6	9	12	12		
7	Bibiana Ng Pei Chin (MAS)	2	4	6	10	11	11		
8	Geraldine Buckley (ENG)	1	3	4	6	8	8		

=== Finals ===
Rank	Name	1	2	3	4	5	6	7	8	9	Points	Notes
1st place, gold medalist(s)	Rahi Sarnobat (IND)	1	1	2	2	2	-	-	-	-	8	
2nd place, silver medalist(s)	Anisa Sayyed (IND)	1	1	0	0	0	-	-	-	-	2	
3rd place, bronze medalist(s)	Lalita Yauhleuskaya (AUS)	1	4	8	11	15	18	22	23	26	10	
4	Alia Sazana Azahari (MAS)	3	7	11	13	17	18	22	23	25	8	
