= Shooting at the 2013 SEA Games – Women's 10 metre air pistol Team =

The Men's 10 metre air pistol Team event at the 2013 SEA Games took place on 14 December 2013 at the North Dagon Shooting Range in Yangon, Myanmar.

There were six teams of three shooters competed, the results of the team competition also served as qualification for individual competition, the top eight shooters qualified to individual final

Each shooter fired 40 shots with an air pistol at 10 metres distance. Scores for each shot were in increments of 1, with a maximum score of 10, all scores from three shooters per team combine to determine team scores.

== Schedule ==
All times are Myanmar Standard Time (UTC+06:30)

Date	Time	Event
Saturday, 14 December 2013	09:00	Final

== Results ==
Rank	Nation	Shooter	Score	Inner 10s	Notes
1st place, gold medalist(s)	Vietnam	Nguyen Minh Chau (375); Le Thi Hoang Ngoc (374); Trieu Thi Hoa Hong (369)	1118	25	
2nd place, silver medalist(s)	Malaysia	Ng Pei Chin Bibiana (372); Cheah Lee Yean Joseline (370); Wahidah Ismail (369)	1111	25	
3rd place, bronze medalist(s)	Singapore	Teo Shun Xie (376); Teh Xiu Hong (370); Teh Xiu Yi (363)	1109	20	
4	Thailand	Kanokkan Chaimongkol (376); Naphaswan Yangpaiboon (368); Chanyanuch Kobkulthanachai (360)	1104	23	
5	Myanmar	May Poe Wah (377); Khin Pa Pa Soe (363); Lay Zar Zar Hlaing Myint (359)	1099	21	
6	Laos	Lathtana Inthavong (361); Kongkham Bouasengphachanh (361); Phoutsady Phommachan (345)	1067	12	
