= Shooting at the 2015 Pan American Games – Women's 25 metre pistol =

Shooting – Women's 25 metre pistol at the 2015 Pan American Games
- Venue: Pan Am Shooting Centre
- Dates: July 14–15
- Competitors: 21 from 14 nations

Medalists
Gold medal	Lynda Kiejko	Canada
Silver medal	Sandra Uptagrafft	United States
Bronze medal	Mariana Nava	Mexico

The women's 25 metre pistol shooting event at the 2015 Pan American Games will be held between the 14 and 15 of July at the Pan Am Shooting Centre in Innisfil.

The event consisted of two rounds: a qualifier and a final. In the qualifier, each shooter fired 60 shots with a pistol at 25 metres distance. Scores for each shot were in increments of 1, with a maximum score of 10. The first 30 shots were in the precision stage, with series of 5 shots being shot within 5 minutes. The second set of 30 shots gave shooters 3 seconds to take each shot.

The top 8 shooters in the qualifying round moved on to the final round. There, they fired an additional 20 shots. These shots scored in increments of .1, with a maximum score of 10.9. They were fired in four sets of 5 rapid fire shots. The total score from all 80 shots was used to determine final ranking.

The winners of all fifteen events, along with the runner up in the men's air rifle, skeet, trap and both women's rifle events will qualify for the 2016 Summer Olympics in Rio de Janeiro, Brazil (granted the athlete has not yet earned a quota for their country).

== Schedule ==
All times are Central Standard Time (UTC−6).

Date	Time	Round
July 14, 2015	13:00	Qualification – Precision
July 15, 2015	12:30	Qualification – Rapid
July 15, 2015	15:30	Semifinal
July 15, 2015	15:45	Finals

== Results ==
=== Qualification round ===
Rank	Athlete	Country	8 s	6 s	4 s	8 s	6 s	4 s	Total	Notes
1	Amanda Mondol	Colombia	97	96	95	93	97	97	575-12x	Q
2	Brenda Shinn	United States	96	98	97	95	94	93	573-13x	Q
3	Mariana Nava	Mexico	95	93	92	97	95	100	572-19x	Q
4	Lynda Kiejko	Canada	94	95	99	93	94	96	571-15x	Q
5	Sandra Uptagrafft	United States	95	95	95	95	97	94	571-08x	Q
6	Claudia Hernández	Cuba	92	95	94	97	98	93	569-12x	Q
7	Andrea Pérez Peña	Ecuador	95	94	95	95	95	95	569-09x	Q
8	Lea Wachowich	Canada	94	91	94	97	95	97	568-17x	Q
9	Laina Pérez	Cuba	91	97	91	95	95	97	566-13x	
10	Lucia Menendez	Guatemala	96	91	96	94	93	95	565-11x	
11	Maria Pia Herrera	Argentina	95	94	95	89	93	96	562-07x	
12	Mariana Quintanilla Camargo	Peru	92	93	90	97	97	92	561-16x	
13	Delmi Cruz	Guatemala	88	91	92	98	96	93	558-14x	
14	Rachel Silveira	Brazil	92	90	92	89	97	94	554-10x	
15	Maribel Pineda	Venezuela	92	92	95	97	94	82	552-09x	
16	Editzy Pimentel	Venezuela	90	89	90	96	96	89	550-14x	
17	Brianda Rivera	Peru	92	86	87	95	95	94	549-09x	
18	Jenny Bedoya	Ecuador	89	94	96	88	93	84	544-12x	
19	Lilian Castro	El Salvador	91	87	89	94	82	96	539-04x	
20	Rosario Piña	Dominican Republic	90	90	90	90	89	88	537-05x	
21	Karen Nogueina-Gerard	Virgin Islands	92	93	92	85	92	80	534-04x	

=== Semifinal ===
Rank	Athlete	Country	1	2	3	4	5	Total	Shoot-Off	Notes
1	Lynda Kiejko	Canada	1	1	4	4	3	13		QG
2	Sandra Uptagrafft	United States	2	1	4	3	2	12		QG
3	Lea Wachowich	Canada	2	3	4	2	0	11		QB
4	Mariana Nava	Mexico	2	4	0	1	3	10	4	QB
5	Andrea Pérez Peña	Ecuador	2	2	2	1	3	10	1	
6	Brenda Shinn	United States	2	3	0	3	1	9		
7	Amanda Mondol	Colombia	1	2	1	1	3	8		
8	Claudia Hernández	Cuba	3	2	1	1	1	8		

=== Finals ===
==== Bronze-medal match ====
Rank	Athlete	Country	1	2	3	4	5	Total	Notes
3rd place, bronze medalist(s)	Mariana Nava	Mexico	0	2	2	2	1	7	
4	Lea Wachowich	Canada	2	0	0	0	1	3	

==== Gold-medal match ====
Rank	Athlete	Country	1	2	3	4	5	Total	Notes
1st place, gold medalist(s)	Lynda Kiejko	Canada	1	1	2	1	2	7	
2nd place, silver medalist(s)	Sandra Uptagrafft	United States	1	1	0	1	0	3	
