= Shooting at the 2010 South American Games – Women's 25m sport pistol =

The Women's 25m sport pistol event at the 2010 South American Games was held on March 24, with the qualification at 9:00 and the Finals at 12:00.

== Individual ==
=== Medalists ===
Gold	Silver	Bronze
Editzy Pimentel; Venezuela	Amanda Mondol; Colombia	Ana Mello; Brazil

=== Results ===
==== Qualification ====
Rank	Athlete	Precision				Rapid				Total
Rank	Athlete	1	2	3	T	4	5	6	T	Total
1	Editzy Pimentel (VEN)	91	97	94	282	97	95	98	290	572
2	Amanda Mondol (COL)	95	94	97	286	92	96	90	286	564
3	Ana Mello (BRA)	94	95	93	282	88	94	95	277	559
4	Barbara Andrea Cayita (ARG)	89	96	93	278	92	94	92	278	556
5	Lenny Estevez (VEN)	94	93	95	282	91	89	90	270	552
6	Cibele Breide (BRA)	92	92	93	277	91	92	90	273	550
7	Miriam Mariana Camargo (PER)	93	89	92	274	87	95	90	272	546
8	Carolina Lozado (URU)	93	94	93	280	90	89	84	263	543
9	Gloria Rivera (CHI)	91	84	92	267	86	95	94	275	542
10	Andrea Rodrigues (ARG)	88	90	93	271	88	93	88	269	540
11	Maria Terezia Robledo (COL)	90	82	91	263	90	93	90	273	536
12	Julie Reina Tello (PER)	94	91	95	280	81	92	79	252	532
13	Maria Carolina Morales (CHI)	90	92	88	270	83	84	87	254	524
14	Carmen Elens Merchan (ECU)	95	91	97	283	98	64	64	226	509

==== Final ====
Rank	Athlete	Qual Score	Final Score	Total	Shoot-off
1st place, gold medalist(s)	Editzy Pimentel (VEN)	572	198.6	770.6	
2nd place, silver medalist(s)	Amanda Mondol (COL)	564	199.2	763.2	
3rd place, bronze medalist(s)	Ana Mello (BRA)	559	198.1	757.1	
4	Barbara Andrea Cayita (ARG)	556	192.5	748.5	
5	Lenny Estevez (VEN)	552	192.3	744.3	
6	Cibele Breide (BRA)	546	196.2	742.2	
7	Miriam Mariana Camargo (PER)	550	186.9	736.9	
8	Carolina Lozado (URU)	543	181.6	724.6	

== Team ==
=== Medalists ===
Gold	Silver	Bronze
Editzy Pimentel; Lenny Estevez; Venezuela	Ana Mello; Cibele Breide; Brazil	Amanda Mondol; Maria Terezia Robledo; Colombia

=== Results ===
Rank	Athlete	Precision				Rapid				Total
Rank	Athlete	1	2	3	T	4	5	6	T	Total
1st place, gold medalist(s)	Venezuela									1124
1st place, gold medalist(s)	Editzy Pimentel (VEN)	91	97	94	282	97	95	98	290	572
1st place, gold medalist(s)	Lenny Estevez (VEN)	94	93	95	282	91	89	90	270	552
2nd place, silver medalist(s)	Brazil									1105
2nd place, silver medalist(s)	Ana Mello (BRA)	94	95	93	282	88	94	95	277	559
2nd place, silver medalist(s)	Cibele Breide (BRA)	92	92	93	277	91	92	90	273	550
3rd place, bronze medalist(s)	Colombia									1100
3rd place, bronze medalist(s)	Amanda Mondol (COL)	95	94	97	286	92	96	90	286	564
3rd place, bronze medalist(s)	Maria Terezia Robledo (COL)	90	82	91	263	90	93	90	273	536
4	Argentina									1096
4	Barbara Andrea Cayita (ARG)	89	96	93	278	92	94	92	278	556
4	Andrea Rodrigues (ARG)	88	90	93	271	88	93	88	269	540
5	Peru									1082
5	Miriam Mariana Camargo (PER)	93	89	92	274	87	95	90	272	546
5	Julie Reina Tello (PER)	94	91	95	280	81	92	79	252	532
6	Chile									1066
6	Gloria Rivera (CHI)	91	84	92	267	86	95	94	275	542
6	Maria Carolina Morales (CHI)	90	92	88	270	83	84	87	254	524
