= Shooting at the 2010 South American Games – Women's 10m air pistol =

The Women's 10m air pistol event at the 2010 South American Games was held on March 22, with the qualification at 12:00 and the Finals at 14:00.

== Individual ==
=== Medalists ===
| Gold | Silver | Bronze |
|---|---|---|
| Editzy Pimentel; Venezuela | Lenny Estevez; Venezuela | Amanda Mondol; Colombia |

=== Results ===
==== Qualification ====
| Rank | Athlete | Series | | | | Total | Shoot-off |
| Rank | Athlete | 1 | 2 | 3 | 4 | Total | Shoot-off |
|---|---|---|---|---|---|---|---|
| 1 | Editzy Pimentel (VEN) | 95 | 92 | 95 | 97 | 379 | |
| 2 | Amanda Mondol (COL) | 92 | 93 | 95 | 93 | 373 | |
| 3 | Lenny Estevez (VEN) | 92 | 92 | 94 | 93 | 371 | |
| 4 | Ana Mello (BRA) | 91 | 93 | 93 | 92 | 369 | |
| 5 | Andrea Rodrigues (ARG) | 90 | 91 | 94 | 89 | 364 | |
| 6 | Maria Lorena Vintimilla (ECU) | 86 | 93 | 92 | 92 | 363 | |
| 6 | Barbara Andrea Cayita (ARG) | 88 | 93 | 91 | 91 | 363 | |
| 8 | Thais Moura (BRA) | 96 | 85 | 90 | 91 | 362 | |
| 9 | Ingrid Gonesh (AHO) | 87 | 91 | 90 | 92 | 360 | |
| 9 | Carolina Lozado (URU) | 88 | 87 | 93 | 92 | 360 | |
| 9 | Julie Reina Tello (PER) | 88 | 90 | 91 | 91 | 360 | |
| 12 | Miriam Mariana Camargo (PER) | 87 | 87 | 93 | 89 | 356 | |
| 13 | Carmen Elena Merchan (ECU) | 87 | 87 | 89 | 90 | 353 | |
| 14 | Gloria Rivera (CHI) | 87 | 89 | 89 | 87 | 352 | |
| 14 | Monique Suzanne de Garcia (BOL) | 99 | 85 | 88 | 80 | 352 | |
| 16 | Maria Carolina Morales (CHI) | 85 | 89 | 88 | 86 | 348 | |
| | Adriana Rendón (COL) | | | | | DSQ | |

==== Final ====
| Rank | Athlete | Qual Score | Final Score | Total | Shoot-off |
|---|---|---|---|---|---|
| 1st place, gold medalist(s) | Editzy Pimentel (VEN) | 379 | 96.7 | 475.7 | |
| 2nd place, silver medalist(s) | Lenny Estevez (VEN) | 371 | 97.4 | 468.4 | |
| 3rd place, bronze medalist(s) | Amanda Mondol (COL) | 373 | 92.8 | 465.8 | |
| 4 | Ana Mello (BRA) | 369 | 96.5 | 465.5 | |
| 5 | Andrea Rodrigues (ARG) | 364 | 94.4 | 458.4 | |
| 6 | Maria Lorena Vintimilla (ECU) | 363 | 93.9 | 456.9 | |
| 7 | Thais Moura (BRA) | 362 | 94.2 | 456.2 | |
| 8 | Barbara Andrea Cayita (ARG) | 363 | 91.2 | 454.2 | |

== Team ==
=== Medalists ===
| Gold | Silver | Bronze |
|---|---|---|
| Editzy Pimentel; Lenny Estevez; Venezuela | Ana Mello; Thais Moura; Brazil | Andrea Rodrigues; Barbara Andrea Cayita; Argentina |

=== Results ===
| Rank | Athlete | Series | | | | Total |
| Rank | Athlete | 1 | 2 | 3 | 4 | Total |
|---|---|---|---|---|---|---|
| 1st place, gold medalist(s) | Venezuela | | | | | 750 |
| 1st place, gold medalist(s) | Editzy Pimentel (VEN) | 95 | 92 | 95 | 97 | 379 |
| 1st place, gold medalist(s) | Lenny Estevez (VEN) | 92 | 92 | 94 | 93 | 371 |
| 2nd place, silver medalist(s) | Brazil | | | | | 731 |
| 2nd place, silver medalist(s) | Ana Mello (BRA) | 91 | 93 | 93 | 92 | 369 |
| 2nd place, silver medalist(s) | Thais Moura (BRA) | 96 | 85 | 90 | 91 | 362 |
| 3rd place, bronze medalist(s) | Argentina | | | | | 727 |
| 3rd place, bronze medalist(s) | Andrea Rodrigues (ARG) | 90 | 91 | 94 | 89 | 364 |
| 3rd place, bronze medalist(s) | Barbara Andrea Cayita (ARG) | 88 | 93 | 91 | 91 | 363 |
| 4 | Peru | | | | | 716 |
| 4 | Julie Reina Tello (PER) | 88 | 90 | 91 | 91 | 360 |
| 4 | Miriam Mariana Camargo (PER) | 87 | 87 | 93 | 89 | 356 |
| 5 | Ecuador | | | | | 716 |
| 5 | Maria Lorena Vintimilla (ECU) | 86 | 93 | 92 | 92 | 363 |
| 5 | Carmen Elena Merchan (ECU) | 87 | 87 | 89 | 90 | 353 |
| 6 | Chile | | | | | 700 |
| 6 | Gloria Rivera (CHI) | 87 | 89 | 89 | 87 | 352 |
| 6 | Maria Carolina Morales (CHI) | 85 | 89 | 88 | 86 | 348 |
