= Shooting at the 2010 Commonwealth Games – Women's 25 metre pistol singles =

The Women's 25 metre pistol singles event at the 2010 Commonwealth Games took place on 6 October 2010 at the CRPF Campus. There was a qualification round held to determine the final participants.

== Results ==
Rank	Name	Qualif.	1 11	2/12	3/13	4/14	5/15	6/16	7/17	8/18	9/19	10/20	Final	Total
1st place, gold medalist(s)	Anisa Sayyed (IND)	583	10.4; 10.6	9.4; 10.3	10.3; 10.1	10.45; 10.7	10.9; 10.6	10.2; 9.7	9.9; 9.3	10.2; 10.2	10.2; 10.5	9.7; 10.1	203.8	786.8 (FGR)
2nd place, silver medalist(s)	Rahi Sarnobat (IND)	576	9.8; 10.3	10.0; 10.2	9.9; 10.3	10.3; 10.7	10.2; 9.8	10.0; 10.4	10.1; 9.7	10.4; 10.8	10.7; 10.6	10.4; 10.4	205.0	781.0
3rd place, bronze medalist(s)	Pei Ng (MAS)	580	9.6; 9.6	10.1; 9.3	9.7; 10.6	10.3; 9.4	10.4; 10.2	6.3; 10.5	9.4; 10.8	10.1; 10.2	10.4; 10.8	10.7; 9.8	198.2	778.2
4	Lalita Yauhleuskaya (AUS)	571	10.2; 10.3	10.2; 10.0	7.4; 10.2	9.4; 10.0	10.1; 10.4	10.9; 10.2	9.9; 10.9	9.9; 10.8	10.2; 10.4	9.9; 9.7	201.0	772.0
5	Linda Ryan (AUS)	571	10.0; 8.8	10.2; 10.0	10.2; 10.7	10.2; 9.0	9.8; 10.3	7.4; 10.3	10.9; 10.3	10.7; 10.7	10.7; 10.0	9.4; 8.8	198.4	769.4
6	Siti Mohd Badrin (MAS)	569	10.3; 10.5	9.1; 7.7	10.9; 10.1	10.3; 10.2	9.6; 10.5	10.7; 10.0	10.4; 8.0	10.8; 10.4	10.4; 9.9	9.5; 10.9	200.2	769.2
7	Julia Lydall (ENG)	568	10.0; 9.3	9.8; 9.0	10.5; 9.9	8.3; 10.8	10.1; 10.0	10.6; 10.4	10.4; 9.1	9.7; 10.2	10.2; 9.5	9.8; 9.9	197.5	765.5
8	Lea Wachowich (CAN)	565	10.8; 10.4	9.7; 10.4	8.1; 10.4	8.9; 10.3	10.6; 9.2	9.6; 10.0	9.5; 8.2	10.5; 10.3	7.8; 8.3	10.6; 8.6	192.2	757.2
