= Shooting at the 2010 Commonwealth Games – Women's 10 metre air pistol pairs =

Women's 10 metre air pistol pairs at the 2010 Commonwealth Games
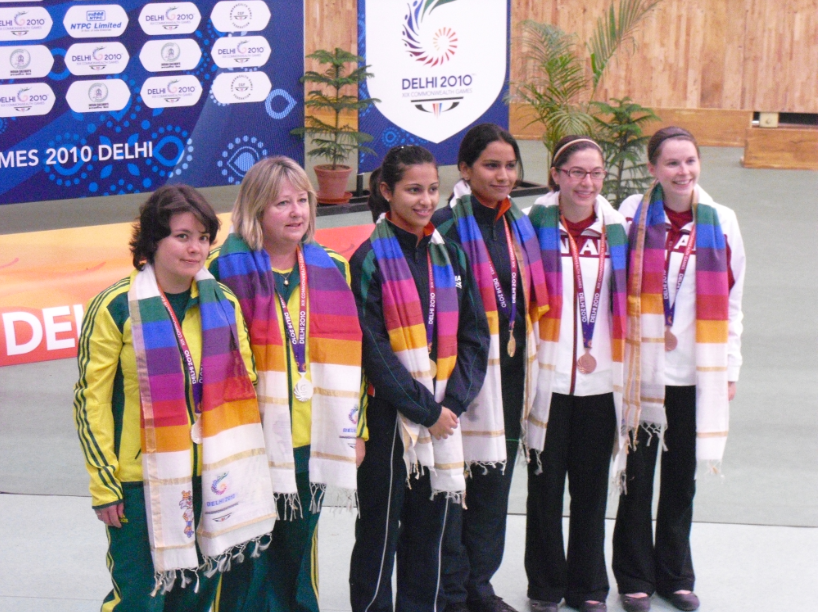
- From the left: Dina Aspandiyarova, Pamela McKenzie, Heena Sidhu, Annu Raj Singh, Lynda Hare, Dorothy Ludwig.
- Venue: Dr. Karni Singh Shooting Range
- Dates: 12 October 2010
- Competitors: 8 pairs from 8 nations
- Winning points: 759^{21}

Medalists
gold medal	Heena Sidhu; Annu Raj Singh	India
silver medal	Dina Aspandiyarova; Pamela McKenzie	Australia
bronze medal	Dorothy Ludwig; Lynda Hare	Canada

The Women's 10 metre air pistol pairs event took place at 12 October 2010 at the CRPF Campus.

== Results ==
Rank	Name	Country	1	2	3	4	Ind. Total	Total
1st place, gold medalist(s)	Heena Sidhu	India	96	94	97	97	384^{12}	759^{21}
1st place, gold medalist(s)	Annu Raj Singh	India	92	95	95	93	375^{9}	759^{21}
2nd place, silver medalist(s)	Dina Aspandiyarova	Australia	97	96	96	95	384^{12}	759^{21}
2nd place, silver medalist(s)	Pamela McKenzie	Australia	92	93	95	95	375^{9}	759^{21}
3rd place, bronze medalist(s)	Dorothy Ludwig	Canada	96	94	95	95	380^{10}	759^{14}
3rd place, bronze medalist(s)	Lynda Hare	Canada	94	95	95	95	379^{4}	759^{14}
4	Lee Cheah	Malaysia	95	96	94	93	384^{12}	759^{21}
4	Pei Ng	Malaysia	96	91	98	90	375^{9}	759^{21}
5	Gorgs Geikie	England	92	94	93	94	373^{6}	745^{12}
5	Julia Lydall	England	91	93	93	95	372^{6}	745^{12}
6	Erini Panteli	Cyprus	95	94	92	97	378^{14}	739^{16}
6	Constantina Pratsi	Cyprus	89	93	85	94	361^{2}	739^{16}
7	Shun Teo	Singapore	95	96	94	94	379^{7}	759^{21}
7	Xiao Fan	Singapore	95	86	90	88	359^{7}	759^{21}
8	Rachel Gravell	Wales	85	92	89	94	360^{4}	718^{8}
8	Nicola Wilson	Wales	89	89	87	93	358^{4}	718^{8}
