= Shooting at the 2010 South American Games =

- Dates: March 20–26

There were 34 shooting events at the 2010 South American Games. Competitions were held over March 20–26.

== Medal summary ==
=== Medal table ===
Rank	Nation	Gold	Silver	Bronze	Total
1	Brazil (BRA)	10	6	5	21
2	Venezuela (VEN)	8	7	2	17
3	Argentina (ARG)	6	10	10	26
4	Chile (CHI)	4	3	3	10
5	Colombia (COL)	2	2	5	9
6	Bolivia (BOL)	2	1	5	8
7	Peru (PER)	1	5	3	9
8	Netherlands Antilles (AHO)	1	0	0	1
9	Uruguay (URU)	0	0	1	1
Totals (9 entries)		34	34	34	102

== Men ==
Event	Gold	Silver	Bronze
Men's 10m air rifle	Marcos Antonio Garcia; Chile	Marcelo Albizu; Argentina	Cristian Jaime Bustos; Bolivia
Men's team 10m air rifle	Marcos Antonio Garcia; Mauricio Andrés García; Chile	Marcelo Albizu; Pablo Alvarez; Argentina	Rocco Rosito; Guilherme Ferreira; Brazil
Men's 50m rifle prone	Elias Roberto Onatt; Chile	Raul Vargas; Venezuela	Pablo Alvarez; Argentina
Men's team 50m rifle prone	Júlio Cesar Iemma; Raul Vargas; Venezuela	Elias Roberto Onatt; Gonzalo Andres Zilleruelo; Chile	Pablo Alvarez; Alex Misael Suligoy; Argentina
Men's 50m rifle 3 positions	Rocco Rosito; Brazil	Júlio Cesar Iemma; Venezuela	Juan Diego Angeloni; Argentina
Men's team 50m rifle 3 positions	Júlio Cesar Iemma; Raul Vargas; Venezuela	Pablo Alvarez; Juan Diego Angeloni; Argentina	Rocco Rosito; Aliseu Faria; Brazil
Men's 10m air pistol	Júlio Almeida; Brazil	Frank Bonilla; Venezuela	Manuel Benjamin Maturana; Chile
Men's team 10m air pistol	Júlio Almeida; Felipe Almeida Wu; Brazil	Frank Bonilla; Marco Antonio Nuñez; Venezuela	Matias Gustavo Orozco; Maximino Modesti; Argentina
Men's 25m standard pistol	Júlio Almeida; Brazil	José Batista; Brazil	Daniel Cesar Felizia; Argentina
Men's team 25m standard pistol	Júlio Almeida; José Batista; Brazil	Alex Fernan Enciso; Jorge Enrique Silva; Colombia	Diego Andres Quiroga; Rudolf Cordero; Bolivia
Men's 25m rapid fire pistol	Daniel Cesar Felizia; Argentina	Roman Martin Lastretti; Argentina	Bernardo Tobar Prado; Colombia
Men's team 25m rapid fire pistol	Daniel Cesar Felizia; Roman Martin Lastretti; Argentina	Volney Mello; Emerson Duarte; Brazil	Bernardo Tobar Prado; Alex Fernan Enciso; Colombia
Men's 50m pistol	Júlio Almeida; Brazil	Marco Antonio Nunez; Venezuela	Rafael Alberto Araus; Argentina
Men's team 50m pistol	Júlio Almeida; Tulio Gomes; Brazil	Rafael Alberto Araus; Maximino Tomas Modesti; Argentina	Marco Antonio Nunez; Frank Bonilla; Venezuela
Men's skeet	Fernando Luis Gazzotti; Argentina	Khalid Metwasi; Peru	Marco Rodolfo Walker; Peru
Men's team skeet	Khalid Metwasi; Marco Rodolfo Walker; Peru	Bonifacio de Raadt; Marcelo Yamal Jadue; Chile	Fernando Luis Gazzotti; Horacio Pedro Gil; Argentina
Men's trap	Nicolas David Guerra; Colombia	Carlos Costa; Brazil	Hugo Jose Rodulfo; Argentina
Men's team trap	Nicolas David Guerra; Danilo Caro; Colombia	Fernando Borrello; Hugo Jose Rodulfo; Argentina	Carlos Costa; Eduardo Correa; Brazil
Men's trap automatic	Cesar David Flores; Bolivia	Francisco Juan Dibos; Peru	Juan Carlos Gacha; Bolivia
Men's team trap automatic	Cesar David Flores; Juan Carlos Gacha; Bolivia	Francisco Juan Dibos; Asier Josu Parodi; Peru	Mario Soarez; Humberto Oliveiro; Venezuela
Men's double trap	Filipe Fuzaro; Brazil	Asier Josu Parodi; Peru	Cesar David Flores; Bolivia
Men's team double trap	Filipe Fuzaro; Jaison Santin; Brazil	Asier Josu Parodi; Francisco Juan Dibos; Peru	Juan Carlos Gacha; Cesar David Flores; Bolivia

== Women ==
Event	Gold	Silver	Bronze
Women's 10m air rifle	Roberta Cabo; Brazil	Wendy Daisy de la Cruz; Bolivia	Cecilia Elena Zeid; Argentina
Women's team 10m air rifle	Cecilia Elena Zeid; Amelia Fournel; Argentina	Karina Paola Cerpa; Gabriela Plaza; Chile	Roberta Cabo; Rosane Ewald; Brazil
Women's 50m rifle prone	Marlil Luisa Romero; Venezuela	Maria de los Reyes Cardellino; Argentina	Diana Cabrera; Uruguay
Women's team 50m rifle prone	Marlil Luisa Romero; Diliana Méndez; Venezuela	Maria de los Reyes Cardellino; Andrea Alvarez; Argentina	Angela Rodriguez; RosMilena Paternina; Colombia
Women's 50m rifle 3 positions	Amelia Fournel; Argentina	Cacilia Elena Zeid; Argentina	Karina Paola Loayza; Peru
Women's team 50m rifle 3 positions	Amelia Fournel; Cecilia Elena Zeid; Argentina	Lidnimar Rebolledo; Diliana Méndez; Venezuela	Karina Paola Loayza; Silvia Alejandra Lopez; Peru
Women's 10m air pistol	Editzy Pimentel; Venezuela	Lenny Estevez; Venezuela	Amanda Mondol; Colombia
Women's team 10m air pistol	Editzy Pimentel; Lenny Estevez; Venezuela	Ana Mello; Thais Moura; Brazil	Andrea Rodrigues; Barbara Andrea Cayita; Argentina
Women's 25m sport pistol	Editzy Pimentel; Venezuela	Amanda Mondol; Colombia	Ana Mello; Brazil
Women's team 25m sport pistol	Editzy Pimentel; Lenny Estevez; Venezuela	Ana Mello; Cibele Breide; Brazil	Amanda Mondol; Maria Terezia Robledo; Colombia
Women's skeet	Francisca Valeria Chadid; Chile	Melisa Gil; Argentina	Fabiola Andrea Espinoza; Chile
Women's trap	Anne-Marie Pietersz; Netherlands Antilles	Janice Teixeira; Brazil	Pamela Boghikian; Chile
