= Shooting at the 2014 Commonwealth Games – Women's 10 metre air pistol =

Shooting – Women's 10 metre air pistol at the 2014 Commonwealth Games
- Venue: Barry Buddon Shooting Centre
- Dates: July 25, 2014
- Competitors: 30 from 18 nations
- Winning total points: 198.6 points (GR)

Medalists
gold medal	Teo Shun Xie	Singapore
silver medal	Malaika Goel	India
bronze medal	Dorothy Ludwig	Canada

The Women's 10 metre air pistol event took place on 25 July 2014 at the Barry Buddon Shooting Centre. There was a qualification in which the top 8 athletes qualified for the finals. In the finals, each athlete shot 3 times. The latter was eliminated. After that, each athlete once and threw the athlete lowest score was eliminated by the winners.

== Results ==
=== Preliminares ===
Rank	Name	Country	1	2	3	4	Final	Notes
1	Heena Sidhu	India	97	96	94	96	383	Q
2	Lalita Yauhleuskaya	Australia	98	95	92	94	379	Q
3	Lynda Kiejko	Canada	97	92	95	94	378	Q
4	Malaika Goel	India	96	92	95	95	378	Q
5	Teo Shun Xie	Singapore	95	94	94	94	377	Q
6	Armin Asha	Bangladesh	96	91	96	93	376	Q
7	Coral Kennerley	Wales	96	92	93	94	375	Q
8	Dorothy Ludwig	Canada	92	95	95	93	375	Q
9	Wahidah Ismail	Malaysia	94	94	94	93	375	
10	Ardina Fedeous	Bangladesh	95	94	94	92	375	
11	Emily Esposito	Australia	96	92	91	94	373	
12	Joseline Cheah Lee Yeah	Malaysia	93	95	92	93	373	
13	Eleanor Bezzina	Malta	94	92	94	92	372	
14	Nicola Holmes	Jersey	94	92	92	94	372	
15	Mehwish Farhan	Pakistan	93	94	92	90	369	
16	Tara Laine	Guernsey	91	94	92	90	367	
17	Geraldine Buckley	England	95	93	91	87	366	
18	Victoria Mullin	England	94	92	92	87	365	
19	Ruwini Abeymanna	Sri Lanka	89	90	94	91	364	
20	Shawnee Bourner	Wales	86	90	91	95	362	
21	Ling Chiao Nicole Tan	Singapore	86	91	92	87	356	
22	Amali Kulathunge	Sri Lanka	86	89	86	93	354	
23	Nikki Trebert	Guernsey	75	88	92	96	351	
24	Caroline Brownlie	Scotland	84	84	89	93	350	
25	Irene Panteli	Cyprus	82	80	88	86	336	
26	Denise Reeves	Norfolk Island	83	79	88	86	336	
27	Linet Awuor Owiti	Kenya	83	79	88	81	331	
28	Jacqui Grundy	Norfolk Island	79	80	84	86	329	
-	Tazeem Akhtar Abbasi	Pakistan	-	-	-	-	-	DNS
-	Yetunde Olabode	Nigeria	-	-	-	-	-	DNS

=== Final ===
Rank	Name	Country	1	2	3	4	5	6	7	8	9	Final	Notes
1st place, gold medalist(s)	Teo Shun Xie	Singapore	28.7	29.3	19.1	19.4	20.6	20.3	20.6	20.7	19.9	198.6	GR
2nd place, silver medalist(s)	Malaika Goel	India	30.9	30.8	18.8	18.6	18.8	19.5	20.1	19.4	19.2	197.1	
3rd place, bronze medalist(s)	Dorothy Ludwig	Canada	30.8	29.3	18.2	19.3	20.6	20.9	19.9	18.2	-	177.2	
4	Lalita Yauhleuskaya	Australia	28.5	29.4	20.7	19.5	20.9	19.7	19.	-	-	157.7	
5	Lynda Kiejko	Canada	29.5	28.9	19.8	20.6	17.8	18	-	-	-	134.6	
6	Coral Kennerley	Wales	28.2	28.5	19.8	20	18.8	-	-	-	-	115.3	
7	Heena Sidhu	India	29.4	29.9	18.4	18.1	-	-	-	-	-	95.8	
8	Armin Asha	Bangladesh	29.1	27.4	19.4	-	-	-	-	-	-	75.9	
