= Felipe Almeida Wu =

Brazilian sport shooter (born 1992)

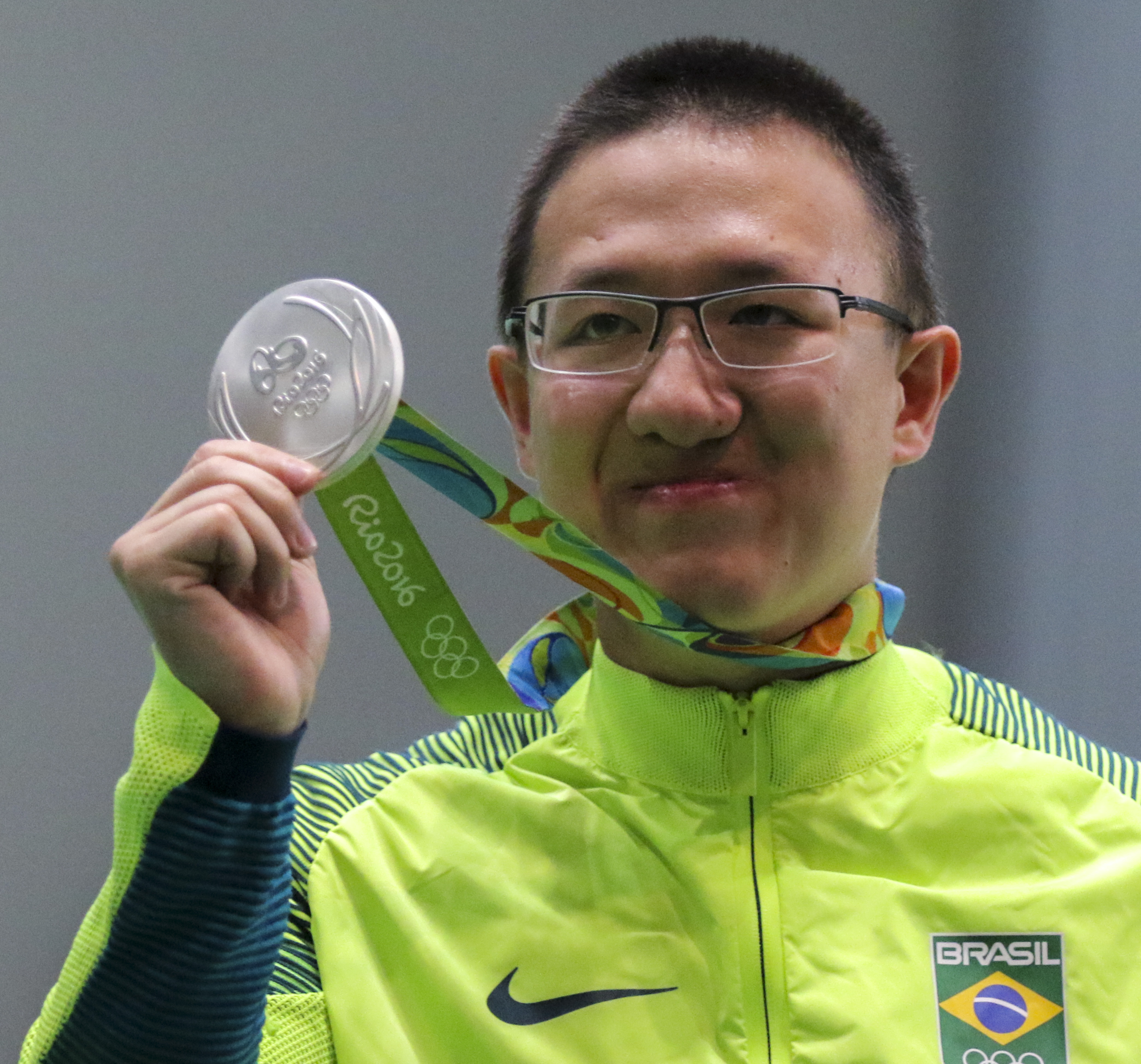
- Wu with his Olympic Silver medal, August 2016

Personal information
- Full name: Felipe Almeida Wu
- Nationality: Brazil
- Born: 11 June 1992 (age 34) São Paulo, Brazil
- Height: 1.69 m (5 ft 7 in)
- Weight: 69 kg (152 lb)

Sport
- Sport: Shooting
- Events: 10 m air pistol (AP60); 50 m pistol (FP)
Medal record
Men's shooting
Representing Brazil
Olympic Games
Silver medal – second place	2016 Rio de Janeiro	10m air pistol
Pan American Games
Gold medal – first place	2015 Toronto	AP60
Bronze medal – third place	2023 Santiago	AP60
South American Games
Gold medal – first place	2010 Medellín	AP60 (T)
Gold medal – first place	2014 Santiago	AP60
Silver medal – second place	2022 Asunción	10m air pistol
Silver medal – second place	2022 Asunción	25m fire pistol
Summer Youth Olympics
Silver medal – second place	2010 Singapore	AP60

Felipe Almeida Wu (born 11 June 1992 in São Paulo) is a Brazilian sport shooter. He won a silver medal in the Men's 10m air pistol event at the 2016 Summer Olympics in Rio de Janeiro.

== Career ==
He won a silver medal in the boys' air pistol at the 2010 Summer Youth Olympics in Singapore, and then added the gold to his career hardware on his senior debut at the 2015 Pan American Games in Toronto.

Almeida Wu made his international shooting debut, as an eighteen-year-old, at the 2010 Summer Youth Olympics in Singapore. There, he picked up the silver medal with a total score of 676.0 in the boys' air pistol, finishing closely behind Ukrainian shooter and 2012 Olympian Denys Kushnirov by three-tenths of a point margin.

Despite having missed out his bid for the 2012 Summer Olympics in London, Almeida Wu managed to improve his lifetime best of 201.8 points for the final meet record and his first senior title in the men's air pistol at the 2015 Pan American Games in Toronto, Ontario, Canada. Following his gold medal victory at the Games, Almeida Wu has occupied one of the nine places entrusted to the host nation's squad and prepared training to compete for Brazil at the 2016 Summer Olympics in Rio de Janeiro.

Almeida Wu won gold medal in the men's air pistol in Bangkok, Thailand, first stage of 2016 ISSF World Cup.

At the 2016 Summer Olympics in Rio de Janeiro, Almeida Wu won a silver medal in the Men's 10m air pistol event. This was Brazil's first medal at the first Olympics in Brazil. Almeida Wu is also the first Brazilian of Chinese descent to win a medal at the Olympics. Following this success, Almeida Wu became well known in Brazil for his exploits.

He competed at the 2020 Summer Olympics.
