= Shooting at the 2010 Summer Youth Olympics – Boys' 10 metre air pistol =

These are the results of the boys' 10m air pistol event at the 2010 Youth Olympic Games. The competition took place on August 24, with the qualification at 9:00 and the Finals at 12:00.

== Medalists ==
Gold	Denys Kushnirov; Ukraine
Silver	Felipe Almeida Wu; Brazil
Bronze	Daehan Choi; South Korea

== Qualification ==
Rank	Athlete	Series						Total	X
Rank	Athlete	1	2	3	4	5	6	Total	X
1	Denys Kushnirov (UKR)	96	98	94	97	96	97	578	24
2	Felipe Almeida Wu (BRA)	97	96	94	95	96	98	576	26
3	Jia Xiayong (CHN)	95	96	96	93	95	97	572	21
4	Nikolai Kilin (RUS)	98	99	95	94	92	94	572	20
5	Jindrich Dubovy (CZE)	95	92	98	96	97	93	571	20
6	Aliaksei Horbach (BLR)	95	96	93	95	95	97	571	15
7	Daehan Choi (KOR)	92	97	96	95	96	95	571	12
8	Philipp Kaefer (GER)	92	94	97	95	96	96	570	13
9	Stefan Rares Ion (ROU)	95	94	96	94	93	92	564	12
10	Romik Vardumyan (ARM)	96	91	94	92	94	96	563	13
11	Raef Tawfik (EGY)	94	95	94	93	94	92	562	8
12	Sepehr Safariboroujeni (IRI)	92	95	94	95	94	91	561	10
13	Vincent Jeanningros (FRA)	90	93	95	93	92	97	560	8
14	Julio Nava (MEX)	94	92	93	93	92	95	559	9
15	Shao Chien Tien (TPE)	93	92	95	96	89	94	559	9
16	Elia Andruccioli (SMR)	95	90	91	92	95	91	554	13
17	Janek Janski (AUS)	89	92	94	91	92	96	554	12
18	Wen Yi Wu (SIN)	89	90	89	94	94	90	546	10
19	Solomon Borisov (BUL)	90	89	92	85	92	90	538	6
20	Csaba Bartok (HUN)	89	88	88	88	91	84	528	5

== Final ==
Rank	Athlete	Quali	Series										Final	Total
Rank	Athlete	Quali	1	2	3	4	5	6	7	8	9	10	Final	Total
1st place, gold medalist(s)	Denys Kushnirov (UKR)	578	10.2	9.1	9.5	9.8	9.7	9.8	10.0	10.0	10.5	9.7	98.3	676.3
2nd place, silver medalist(s)	Felipe Almeida Wu (BRA)	576	9.2	10.1	10.2	10.4	10.3	9.9	9.0	10.7	9.7	10.5	100.0	676.0
3rd place, bronze medalist(s)	Daehan Choi (KOR)	571	9.4	9.7	9.2	10.7	10.8	9.7	10.2	9.7	10.6	10.6	100.6	671.6
4	Aliaksei Horbach (BLR)	571	10.1	9.9	10.1	9.8	10.6	10.3	9.1	10.5	9.7	9.7	99.8	670.8
5	Philipp Kaefer (GER)	570	10.1	9.9	10.6	9.7	10.5	9.1	9.9	10.1	9.6	10.6	100.1	670.1
6	Jindrich Dubovy (CZE)	571	10.5	10.0	9.7	9.2	10.0	10.1	10.2	10.2	10.3	8.6	98.8	669.8
7	Jia Xiayong (CHN)	572	9.5	9.2	10.5	9.3	9.7	9.7	10.0	9.4	9.9	10.0	97.2	669.2
8	Nikolai Kilin (RUS)	572	9.9	10.0	8.8	8.9	10.4	10.2	9.6	9.9	9.6	9.5	96.8	668.8
