= Shooting at the 2013 SEA Games – Women's 10 metre air pistol =

The Women's 10 metre air pistol event at the 2013 SEA Games took place on 14 December 2013 at the North Dagon Shooting Range in Yangon, Myanmar.

The event consisted of two rounds: a qualifier and a final. In the qualifier, each shooter fired 40 shots with an air pistol at 10 metres distance. Scores for each shot were in increments of 1, with a maximum score of 10.

The top 8 shooters in the qualifying round moved on to the final round. The final consists of 2 strings of 3 shots, after which for every two additional shots, the lowest scoring finalist will be dropped. This continues until only two finalists left making the final two shots for the gold. The Final two shooters would have total 20 shots. These shots scored in increments of 0.1, with a maximum score of 10.9.

== Schedule ==
All times are Myanmar Standard Time (UTC+06:30)

Date	Time	Event
Saturday, 14 December 2013	09:00	Qualification
Saturday, 14 December 2013	11:30	Final

== Qualification round ==
Rank	Athlete	Country	1	2	3	4	Total	Inner 10s	Notes
1	May Poe Wah	Myanmar	97	94	94	92	377	7	Q
2	Kanokkan Chaimongkol	Thailand	92	94	92	98	376	11	Q
3	Teo Shun Xie	Singapore	96	95	92	93	376	10	Q
4	Nguyen Minh Chau	Vietnam	93	97	94	91	375	6	Q
5	Le Thi Hoang Ngoc	Vietnam	97	93	92	92	374	10	Q
6	Ng Pei Chin Bibiana	Malaysia	92	92	98	90	372	9	Q
7	Cheah Lee Yean Joseline	Malaysia	91	96	92	91	370	9	Q
8	Teh Xiu Hong	Singapore	91	92	93	94	370	7	Q
9	Trieu Thi Hoa Hong	Vietnam	95	91	89	94	369	9	
10	Wahidah Ismail	Malaysia	94	93	92	90	369	7	
11	Naphaswan Yangpaiboon	Thailand	94	94	87	93	368	7	
12	Khin Pa Pa Soe	Myanmar	91	86	94	92	363	7	
13	Teh Xiu Yi	Singapore	91	93	88	91	363	3	
14	Lathtana Inthavong	Laos	87	91	95	88	361	8	
15	Kongkham Bouasengphachanh	Laos	90	93	88	90	361	1	
16	Chanyanuch Kobkulthanachai	Thailand	92	88	88	92	360	5	
17	Lay Zar Zar Hlaing Myint	Myanmar	94	90	87	88	359	7	
18	Phoutsady Phommachan	Laos	86	90	86	83	345	3	

== Final ==
Legend

- SO — Athlete eliminated by Shoot-off for tie

Rank	Athlete	1st Comp.Stage		2nd Competition Stage - Elimination							Total	Notes
1st place, gold medalist(s)	Nguyen Minh Chau (VIE)	30.4	60.5	79.6	100.5	120.6	139.5	158.7	177.5		195.6	
1st place, gold medalist(s)	Nguyen Minh Chau (VIE)	10.6	10.0	9.7	10.9	9.9	9.2	9.4	8.5	9.4	195.6	
1st place, gold medalist(s)	Nguyen Minh Chau (VIE)	9.8	9.2	9.4	10.0	10.2	9.7	9.8	10.3	8.7	195.6	
1st place, gold medalist(s)	Nguyen Minh Chau (VIE)	10.0	10.9								195.6	
2nd place, silver medalist(s)	Teo Shun Xie (SIN)	27.1	56.7	77.0	97.2	118.6	136.5	156.5	175.1		194.6	
2nd place, silver medalist(s)	Teo Shun Xie (SIN)	8.0	9.7	10.2	9.8	10.8	9.6	10.3	8.9	8.8	194.6	
2nd place, silver medalist(s)	Teo Shun Xie (SIN)	9.1	10.5	10.1	10.4	10.6	8.3	9.7	9.7	10.7	194.6	
2nd place, silver medalist(s)	Teo Shun Xie (SIN)	10.0	9.4								194.6	
3rd place, bronze medalist(s)	Le Thi Hoang Ngoc (VIE)	28.3	57.6	78.6	98.5	117.0	135.1	155.4			174.8	
3rd place, bronze medalist(s)	Le Thi Hoang Ngoc (VIE)	9.4	9.6	10.5	10.3	9.1	8.4	10.2	10.0		174.8	
3rd place, bronze medalist(s)	Le Thi Hoang Ngoc (VIE)	9.0	10.0	10.5	9.6	9.4	9.7	10.1	9.4		174.8	
3rd place, bronze medalist(s)	Le Thi Hoang Ngoc (VIE)	9.9	9.7								174.8	
4	Kanokkan Chaimongkol (THA)	30.4	58.5	78.1	97.6	117.1	135.5				154.2	
4	Kanokkan Chaimongkol (THA)	9.9	9.7	10.6	9.2	10.1	9.2	8.7			154.2	
4	Kanokkan Chaimongkol (THA)	10.3	8.9	9.0	10.3	9.4	9.2	10.0			154.2	
4	Kanokkan Chaimongkol (THA)	10.2	9.5								154.2	
5	May Poe Wah (MYA)	28.5	58.1	78.1	96.3	116.0					133.7	
5	May Poe Wah (MYA)	8.9	10.0	10.2	10.1	10.0	9.7				133.7	
5	May Poe Wah (MYA)	9.6	10.0	9.8	8.1	9.7	8.0				133.7	
5	May Poe Wah (MYA)	10.0	9.6								133.7	
6	Ng Pei Chin Bibiana (MAS)	28.7	58.8	77.3	96.2						116.0	SO
6	Ng Pei Chin Bibiana (MAS)	9.8	9.8	8.9	8.7	9.3					116.0	SO
6	Ng Pei Chin Bibiana (MAS)	10.4	10.0	9.6	10.2	10.5					116.0	SO
6	Ng Pei Chin Bibiana (MAS)	8.5	10.3								116.0	SO
7	Cheah Lee Yean Joseline (MAS)	27.7	54.9	73.7							93.4	
7	Cheah Lee Yean Joseline (MAS)	8.2	9.8	9.3	10.4						93.4	
7	Cheah Lee Yean Joseline (MAS)	9.6	8.9	9.5	9.3						93.4	
7	Cheah Lee Yean Joseline (MAS)	9.9	8.5								93.4	
8	Teh Xiu Hong (SIN)	25.3	53.9								67.8	
8	Teh Xiu Hong (SIN)	9.4	10.0	8.2							67.8	
8	Teh Xiu Hong (SIN)	7.3	8.6	5.7							67.8	
8	Teh Xiu Hong (SIN)	8.6	10.0								67.8	
