= Shooting at the 2010 South American Games – Men's 50m rifle 3 positions =

2010 event at the South American Games

The Men's 50m rifle 3 positions event at the 2010 South American Games was held on March 25, with the qualification at 9:00 and the Finals at 13:00.

== Individual ==
=== Medalists ===
Gold	Silver	Bronze
Rocco Rosito; Brazil	Julio Cesar Iemma; Venezuela	Juan Diego Angeloni; Argentina

=== Results ===
==== Qualification ====
Rank	Athlete	Prone					Standing					Kneeling					Total
Rank	Athlete	1	2	3	4	T	5	6	7	8	T	9	10	11	12	T	Total
1	Rocco Rosito (BRA)	94	97	98	97	386	90	97	96	92	375	95	92	93	94	374	1135
2	Julio Cesar Iemma (VEN)	99	98	99	99	395	94	90	92	93	369	89	95	92	94	370	1134
3	Pablo Alvarez (ARG)	99	96	98	97	390	95	89	90	88	362	93	95	93	94	375	1127
4	Juan Diego Angeloni (ARG)	98	99	97	96	390	87	93	85	87	352	94	95	97	95	381	1123
4	Raul Vargas (VEN)	97	98	93	99	387	91	92	92	91	366	94	95	90	91	370	1123
6	Gonzalo Andres Zilleruelo (CHI)	94	95	93	92	374	91	89	91	85	356	96	94	96	92	378	1108
7	Cesar Renato Laos (PER)	93	95	99	99	386	87	91	87	90	355	89	89	90	96	364	1105
8	Marcos Huerta (CHI)	94	93	92	94	373	86	91	88	86	351	96	95	90	97	378	1102
9	Aliseu Faria (BRA)	94	95	96	94	379	84	90	90	91	355	91	93	91	89	364	1098
10	Orlando Alberto Ramirez (COL)	97	96	92	92	377	84	87	88	92	351	91	90	95	91	367	1095
11	Cristian Fernando Andrade (ECU)	98	95	99	97	389	90	92	86	86	354	85	89	91	86	351	1094
12	Luis Enrique Salvatierra (ECU)	91	96	91	92	370	84	87	87	85	343	92	92	89	84	357	1070
13	Alvaro Duban Echeverri (COL)	96	95	96	96	383	81	82	83	79	325	85	88	93	91	357	1065
14	Alexander Eloy Laurente (PER)	98	98	96	93	385	71	81	74	78	304	87	85	83	86	341	1030

==== Final ====
Rank	Athlete	Qual Score	Final Score	Total	Shoot-off
1st place, gold medalist(s)	Rocco Rosito (BRA)	1135	94.2	1229.2	
2nd place, silver medalist(s)	Julio Cesar Iemma (VEN)	1134	88.6	1222.6	
3rd place, bronze medalist(s)	Juan Diego Angeloni (ARG)	1123	96.1	1219.1	
4	Pablo Alvarez (ARG)	1127	89.4	1216.4	
5	Raul Vargas (VEN)	1123	91.3	1214.3	
6	Cesar Renato Laos (PER)	1105	93.6	1198.6	
7	Gonzalo Andres Zilleruelo (CHI)	1108	83.5	1191.5	
8	Marcos Huerta (CHI)	1102	88.7	1190.7	

== Team ==
=== Medalists ===
Gold	Silver	Bronze
Julio Cesar Iemma; Raul Vargas; Venezuela	Pablo Alvarez; Juan Diego Angeloni; Argentina	Rocco Rosito; Aliseu Faria; Brazil

=== Results ===
Rank	Athlete	Prone					Standing					Kneeling					Total
Rank	Athlete	1	2	3	4	T	5	6	7	8	T	9	10	11	12	T	Total
1st place, gold medalist(s)	Venezuela																2257
1st place, gold medalist(s)	Julio Cesar Iemma (VEN)	99	98	99	99	395	94	90	92	93	369	89	95	92	94	370	1134
1st place, gold medalist(s)	Raul Vargas (VEN)	97	98	93	99	387	91	92	92	91	366	94	95	90	91	370	1123
2nd place, silver medalist(s)	Argentina																2250
2nd place, silver medalist(s)	Pablo Alvarez (ARG)	99	96	98	97	390	95	89	90	88	362	93	95	93	94	375	1127
2nd place, silver medalist(s)	Juan Diego Angeloni (ARG)	98	99	97	96	390	87	93	85	87	352	94	95	97	95	381	1123
3rd place, bronze medalist(s)	Brazil																2233
3rd place, bronze medalist(s)	Rocco Rosito (BRA)	94	97	98	97	386	90	97	96	92	375	95	92	93	94	374	1135
3rd place, bronze medalist(s)	Aliseu Faria (BRA)	94	95	96	94	379	84	90	90	91	355	91	93	91	89	364	1098
4	Chile																2210
4	Gonzalo Andres Zilleruelo (CHI)	94	95	93	92	374	91	89	91	85	356	96	94	96	92	378	1108
4	Marcos Huerta (CHI)	94	93	92	94	373	86	91	88	86	351	96	95	90	97	378	1102
5	Ecuador																2164
5	Cristian Fernando Andrade (ECU)	98	95	99	97	389	90	92	86	86	354	85	89	91	86	351	1094
5	Luis Enrique Salvatierra (ECU)	91	96	91	92	370	84	87	87	85	343	92	92	89	84	357	1070
6	Colombia																2160
6	Orlando Alberto Ramirez (COL)	97	96	92	92	377	84	87	88	92	351	91	90	95	91	367	1095
6	Alvaro Duban Echeverri (COL)	96	95	96	96	383	81	82	83	79	325	85	88	93	91	357	1065
7	Peru																2135
7	Cesar Renato Laos (PER)	93	95	99	99	386	87	91	87	90	355	89	89	90	96	364	1105
7	Alexander Eloy Laurente (PER)	98	98	96	93	385	71	81	74	78	304	87	85	83	86	341	1030
