= Shooting at the 2018 Asian Games – Women's 25 metre pistol =

Women's 25 metre pistol at the 2018 Asian Games
- Venue: Jakabaring Shooting Range
- Dates: 22 August 2018
- Competitors: 32 from 17 nations

Medalists
gold medal	Rahi Sarnobat	India
silver medal	Naphaswan Yangpaiboon	Thailand
bronze medal	Kim Min-jung	South Korea

The women's 25 metre pistol event at the 2018 Asian Games in Jakarta, Indonesia took place on 22 August at the Jakabaring International Shooting Range.

== Schedule ==
All times are Western Indonesia Time (UTC+07:00)

Date	Time	Event
Wednesday, 22 August 2018	09:00	Qualification precision
Wednesday, 22 August 2018	11:00	Qualification rapid
Wednesday, 22 August 2018	15:30	Final

== Records ==
Prior to this competition, the existing world, Asian and Games records were as follows.

Qualification
World Record	Diana Iorgova (BUL)	594	Milan, Italy	31 May 1994
Asian Record	Tao Luna (CHN)	594	Munich, Germany	23 August 2002
Games Record	Chen Ying (CHN)	592	Busan, South Korea	4 October 2002
Final
World Record	Veronika Major (HUN)	40	New Delhi, India	25 April 2018
Asian Record	Naphaswan Yangpaiboon (THA)	38	New Delhi, India	1 March 2017
Games Record	—	—	—	—

== Results ==
Legend

- SO — Shoot-off

=== Qualification ===
Rank	Athlete	Precision			Rapid			Total	Xs	Notes
Rank	Athlete	1	2	3	1	2	3	Total	Xs	Notes
1	Manu Bhaker (IND)	99	98	100	100	97	99	593	20	GR
2	Kim Min-jung (KOR)	98	97	99	100	95	96	585	24	
3	Naphaswan Yangpaiboon (THA)	95	99	97	99	95	100	585	20	
4	Tanyaporn Prucksakorn (THA)	97	98	94	98	97	100	584	21	
5	Lin Yuemei (CHN)	98	96	95	97	99	98	583	18	
6	Tien Chia-chen (TPE)	92	96	99	99	98	97	581	15	
7	Rahi Sarnobat (IND)	97	95	96	98	96	98	580	20	
8	Kwak Jung-hye (KOR)	94	97	97	98	97	97	580	20	
9	Alia Sazana Azahari (MAS)	93	96	95	98	99	98	579	17	
10	Yukari Konishi (JPN)	97	96	95	94	99	98	579	15	
11	Otryadyn Gündegmaa (MGL)	98	91	94	98	98	99	578	24	
12	Yao Yushi (CHN)	96	94	95	96	98	99	578	14	
13	Akiko Sato (JPN)	96	95	97	99	95	96	578	14	
14	Teh Xiu Hong (SGP)	97	98	95	95	95	96	576	17	
15	Lê Thị Linh Chi (VIE)	96	98	92	96	96	97	575	12	
16	May Poe Wah (MYA)	94	92	96	96	98	98	574	18	
17	Wu Chia-ying (TPE)	97	90	95	96	98	97	573	15	
18	Phạm Thị Hà (VIE)	91	96	94	98	97	97	573	8	
19	Zauresh Baibussinova (KAZ)	96	94	95	95	96	96	572	15	
20	Nicole Tan (SGP)	94	94	94	96	97	97	572	11	
21	Yuliya Komendra (KAZ)	91	94	96	98	96	97	572	11	
22	Golnoush Sebghatollahi (IRI)	95	98	90	95	99	95	572	11	
23	Tsogbadrakhyn Mönkhzul (MGL)	94	93	94	97	98	94	570	17	
24	Al-Dana Al-Mubarak (QAT)	90	95	89	99	98	99	570	16	
25	Bibiana Ng (MAS)	97	90	95	91	96	100	569	9	
26	Nasra Mohammed (QAT)	96	91	95	94	93	96	565	11	
27	Hanieh Rostamian (IRI)	94	92	96	87	94	98	561	16	
28	Oktofin Rarun (INA)	95	92	93	94	92	91	557	14	
29	Eva Yulianti Pratiwi (INA)	92	95	93	96	97	84	557	5	
30	Riusha Mohamed (MDV)	92	87	93	87	84	92	535	7	
31	Asma Hawwa (MDV)	90	85	90	83	84	83	515	3	
32	Wadha Al-Balushi (OMA)	91	94	95	73	73	80	506	7	

=== Final ===
Rank	Athlete	1st stage			2nd stage – Elimination							S-off	Notes
Rank	Athlete	1	2	3	1	2	3	4	5	6	7	S-off	Notes
1st place, gold medalist(s)	Rahi Sarnobat (IND)	5	10	14	16	20	25	28	30	32	34	4+3	GR
2nd place, silver medalist(s)	Naphaswan Yangpaiboon (THA)	4	8	12	15	18	22	27	29	34	34	4+2	GR
3rd place, bronze medalist(s)	Kim Min-jung (KOR)	3	8	10	14	17	19	22	26	29			
4	Lin Yuemei (CHN)	4	8	10	15	16	19	23	26			SO	
5	Tanyaporn Prucksakorn (THA)	4	6	8	11	14	17	20					
6	Manu Bhaker (IND)	3	6	8	12	14	16						
7	Kwak Jung-hye (KOR)	2	6	8	10	13							
8	Tien Chia-chen (TPE)	1	3	6	8								
