= Shooting at the 2010 South American Games – Men's 25m rapid fire pistol =

The Men's 25m rapid fire pistol event at the 2010 South American Games was held on March 26, with the qualification at 9:00 and the Finals at 14:00.

== Individual ==
=== Medalists ===
Gold	Silver	Bronze
Daniel Cesar Felizia; Argentina	Roman Martin Lastretti; Argentina	Bernardo Tobar Prado; Colombia

=== Results ===
==== Qualification ====
Rank	Athlete	Stage 1				Stage 2				Total
Rank	Athlete	8	6	4	T	8	6	4	T	Total
1	Daniel Cesar Felizia (ARG)	98	98	92	288	100	94	93	287	575
2	Roman Martin Lastretti (ARG)	95	97	89	281	99	97	91	281	568
3	Bernardo Tobar Prado (COL)	94	92	97	283	96	97	89	282	565
4	Douglas Gomez (VEN)	98	93	82	273	98	96	86	280	553
4	Volney Mello (BRA)	97	95	85	277	95	91	90	276	553
6	Emerson Duarte (BRA)	96	94	89	279	98	98	74	270	549
7	Pedro Manuel George (PER)	93	94	84	271	96	94	80	270	541
8	Angel Felix Gomez (VEN)	93	85	90	268	93	89	83	265	533
8	Alex Fernan Enciso (COL)	94	94	76	264	97	96	76	269	533
10	Diego Andres Quiroga (BOL)	97	94	71	262	90	95	84	269	531
11	Enrique Luis Braschi (PER)	88	93	79	260	97	93	77	267	527
12	Rudolf Cordero (BOL)	96	85	79	260	94	90	76	260	520

==== Final ====
Rank	Athlete	Qual Score	Final Score	Total	Shoot-off
1st place, gold medalist(s)	Daniel Cesar Felizia (ARG)	575	196.9	771.9	
2nd place, silver medalist(s)	Roman Martin Lastretti (ARG)	568	195.4	763.4	
3rd place, bronze medalist(s)	Bernardo Tobar Prado (COL)	565	193.5	758.5	
4	Emerson Duarte (BRA)	549	197.0	746.0	
5	Volney Mello (BRA)	553	186.2	739.2	
6	Douglas Gomez (VEN)	553	185.1	738.1	

== Team ==
=== Medalists ===
Gold	Silver	Bronze
Daniel Cesar Felizia; Roman Martin Lastretti; Argentina	Volney Mello; Emerson Duarte; Brazil	Bernardo Tobar Prado; Alex Fernan Enciso; Colombia

=== Results ===
Rank	Athlete	Stage 1				Stage 2				Total
Rank	Athlete	8	6	4	T	8	6	4	T	Total
1st place, gold medalist(s)	Argentina									1143
1st place, gold medalist(s)	Daniel Cesar Felizia (ARG)	98	98	92	288	100	94	93	287	575
1st place, gold medalist(s)	Roman Martin Lastretti (ARG)	95	97	89	281	99	97	91	281	568
2nd place, silver medalist(s)	Brazil									1102
2nd place, silver medalist(s)	Volney Mello (BRA)	97	95	85	277	95	91	90	276	553
2nd place, silver medalist(s)	Emerson Duarte (BRA)	96	94	89	279	98	98	74	270	549
3rd place, bronze medalist(s)	Colombia									1098
3rd place, bronze medalist(s)	Bernardo Tobar Prado (COL)	94	92	97	283	96	97	89	282	565
3rd place, bronze medalist(s)	Alex Fernan Enciso (COL)	94	94	76	264	97	96	76	269	533
4	Venezuela									1086
4	Douglas Gomez (VEN)	98	93	82	273	98	96	86	280	553
4	Angel Felix Gomez (VEN)	93	85	90	268	93	89	83	265	533
5	Peru									1068
5	Pedro Manuel George (PER)	93	94	84	271	96	94	80	270	541
5	Enrique Luis Braschi (PER)	88	93	79	260	97	93	77	267	527
6	Bolivia									1051
6	Diego Andres Quiroga (BOL)	97	94	71	262	90	95	84	269	531
6	Rudolf Cordero (BOL)	96	85	79	260	94	90	76	260	520
