= Georgina Geikie =

British sport shooter

Personal information
- Nickname: Gorgs
- Education: University of Wales
- Height: 167 cm (5 ft 6 in)
- Other interests: Modern Pentathlon

Sport
- Country: United Kingdom; England
- Sport: Shooting sports
- Events: 10 m Air Pistol; 25m Sport Pistol
- Club: Okehampton Smallbore Rifle Club
- Coached by: Tom Redhead; Margaret Thomas
- Retired: 2016
Medal record
Women's shooting
Representing England
Commonwealth Games
Bronze medal – third place	2006 Melbourne	10 meters air pistol pairs
Bronze medal – third place	2010 Delhi	25 metres pistol pairs

Georgina Geikie (born 6 December 1984) is a British sport shooter who competed for Great Britain in the 2012 Summer Olympics. She has won two bronze medals at the Commonwealth Games.

== Early life ==
Geikie was born in Okehampton, Devon. She studied for a degree in Product Design at Cardiff University.

== Sporting career ==
At the 2006 Commonwealth Games held in Melbourne, Australia, Geikie teamed up with Julia Lydall to win the bronze medal in the women's 10 meters air pistol pairs behind gold medallists Dina Aspandiyarova and Lalita Yauhleuskaya of Australia and silver medallists Joseline Lee Yean Cheah and Bibiana Pei Chin Ng from Malaysia.

In 2008 she set a new British Finals Record for Women's Air Pistol of 485.6. The previous record had stood for sixteen years.

At the 2010 Commonwealth Shooting Championships Geikie won four medals; two individual bronzes and a silver and bronze in team events. She competed for England at the 2010 Commonwealth Games held in Delhi, India. Again partnered by Julia Lydall, the pair repeated their result at the 2006 Games by winning a bronze medal in the women's 25 metre pistol pairs with a score of 1122 points. Despite her medal Geikie lost her place as one of the six athletes funded by British Shooting with money provided by UK Sport following a bi-annual review of performances.

At the 2011 European Shooting Championships in Belgrade, Geikie achieved the Olympic qualifying standard in the 25 metres pistol event earning Great Britain a second qualifying berth for the event in addition to their host nation place. Her score of 578 points meant she finished 13th out of the 48 competitors.

Geikie was chosen to carry the Olympic Flame as it passed through Okehampton on 21 May as part of the 2012 Summer Olympics torch relay. Geikie was selected as one of ten shooters to represent Great Britain at the 2012 Summer Olympics in London. She competed in the women's 25 metres pistol event, finishing 37th with a score of 562 and the 10m air pistol event finishing 47th with a score of 359.

She announced her retirement from competitive shooting in May 2016.

== Post-Sporting Career ==
After retiring from competition, Geikie joined British Shooting, launching the Schools Pistol Championship. She went on to join the Target Sprint Group.
