= Shooting at the 2010 Commonwealth Games – Women's 25 metre pistol pairs =

The Women's 25 metre pistol pairs event at the 2010 Commonwealth Games took place on 5 October 2010 at the CRPF Campus.

== Results ==
Rank	Name	Country	Precision	Rapid	Precision & Rapid	Total
1st place, gold medalist(s)	Rahi Sarnobat	India	288	296	584^{23}	1156^{40}
1st place, gold medalist(s)	Anisa Sayyed	India	284	288	572^{17}	1156^{40}
2nd place, silver medalist(s)	Lalita Yauhleuskaya	Australia	293	288	581^{15}	1146^{23}
2nd place, silver medalist(s)	Linda Ryan	Australia	284	281	565^{8}	1146^{23}
3rd place, bronze medalist(s)	Julia Lydall	England	288	278	566^{11}	1122^{18}
3rd place, bronze medalist(s)	Georgina Geikie	England	282	274	556^{7}	1122^{18}
4	Siti Mohd Badrin	Malaysia	280	282	562^{7}	1120^{16}
4	Pei Ng	Malaysia	285	273	558^{9}	1120^{16}
5	Lea Wachowich	Canada	285	276	561^{12}	1111^{20}
5	Pat Boulay	Canada	278	272	550^{8}	1111^{20}
6	Siew Pheong	Singapore	282	276	558^{11}	1095^{21}
6	Shao Zhang	Singapore	272	265	537^{10}	1095^{21}
–	Asma Hawwa	Maldives	240	272	512^{9}	
–	Shehenaz Ahmed	Maldives			DSQ	
