= Shooting at the 2010 South American Games – Men's 25m standard pistol =

The Men's 25m standard pistol event at the 2010 South American Games was held on March 25 at 9:00.

== Individual ==
=== Medalists ===
Gold	Silver	Bronze
Júlio Almeida; Brazil	José Batista; Brazil	Daniel Cesar Felizia; Argentina

=== Results ===
==== Qualification ====
Rank	Athlete	150 sec			20 sec			10 sec			Total
Rank	Athlete	1	2	T	3	4	T	5	6	T	Total
1st place, gold medalist(s)	Júlio Almeida (BRA)	99	97	196	90	94	184	97	91	188	568
2nd place, silver medalist(s)	José Batista (BRA)	97	97	194	93	94	187	91	88	179	560
3rd place, bronze medalist(s)	Daniel Cesar Felizia (ARG)	94	93	187	98	91	189	91	91	182	558
4	Alex Fernan Enciso (COL)	90	95	185	95	93	188	95	88	183	556
5	Diego Andres Quiroga (BOL)	90	90	180	91	89	180	88	93	181	541
6	Martin Ivan Boluarte (PER)	94	97	191	90	94	184	79	87	166	541
7	David Mendez (VEN)	95	93	188	94	93	187	82	82	164	539
8	Douglas Gomez (VEN)	88	90	178	89	90	179	90	91	181	538
9	Jorge Enrique Silva (COL)	89	97	186	94	90	184	83	85	168	538
10	Rudolf Cordero (BOL)	93	89	182	94	87	181	87	88	175	538
11	Pedro Manuel George (PER)	88	91	179	88	94	182	83	86	169	530
12	Roy Lie (SUR)	89	91	180	90	86	176	84	83	167	523
13	Roman Martin Lastretti (ARG)	85	91	176	88	82	170	79	84	163	509

== Team ==
=== Medalists ===
Gold	Silver	Bronze
Júlio Almeida; José Batista; Brazil	Alex Fernan Enciso; Jorge Enrique Silva; Colombia	Diego Andres Quiroga; Rudolf Cordero; Bolivia

=== Results ===
Rank	Athlete	150 sec			20 sec			10 sec			Total
Rank	Athlete	1	2	T	3	4	T	5	6	T	Total
1st place, gold medalist(s)	Brazil										1128
1st place, gold medalist(s)	Júlio Almeida (BRA)	99	97	196	90	94	184	97	91	188	568
1st place, gold medalist(s)	José Batista (BRA)	97	97	194	93	94	187	91	88	179	560
2nd place, silver medalist(s)	Colombia										1094
2nd place, silver medalist(s)	Alex Fernan Enciso (COL)	90	95	185	95	93	188	95	88	183	556
2nd place, silver medalist(s)	Jorge Enrique Silva (COL)	89	97	186	94	90	184	83	85	168	538
3rd place, bronze medalist(s)	Bolivia										1079
3rd place, bronze medalist(s)	Diego Andres Quiroga (BOL)	90	90	180	91	89	180	88	93	181	541
3rd place, bronze medalist(s)	Rudolf Cordero (BOL)	93	89	182	94	87	181	87	88	175	538
4	Venezuela										1077
4	David Mendez (VEN)	95	93	188	94	93	187	82	82	164	539
4	Douglas Gomez (VEN)	88	90	178	89	90	179	90	91	181	538
5	Peru										1071
5	Martin Ivan Boluarte (PER)	94	97	191	90	94	184	79	87	166	541
5	Pedro Manuel George (PER)	88	91	179	88	94	182	83	86	169	530
6	Argentina										1067
6	Daniel Cesar Felizia (ARG)	94	93	187	98	91	189	91	91	182	558
6	Roman Martin Lastretti (ARG)	85	91	176	88	82	170	79	84	163	509
