= Filipe Fuzaro =

Brazilian sport shooter (born 1982)

Personal information
- Full name: Filipe Antônio Carneiro Fuzaro
- Nationality: Brazil
- Born: 5 December 1982 (age 43) São Paulo, Brazil
- Height: 1.76 m (5 ft 9 1/2 in)
- Weight: 75 kg (165 lb)

Sport
- Sport: Shooting
- Events: Trap, double trap
- Club: Club de Campo Rio Claro
- Coached by: Carlo Donna
Medal record
Men's shooting
Representing Brazil
South American Games
| Gold medal – first place | 2010 Medellín | double trap |
| Gold medal – first place | 2010 Medellín | double trap - Team |

Filipe Antônio Carneiro Fuzaro (born December 5, 1982, in São Paulo) is a Brazilian sport shooter. He won a gold medal for the men's double trap at the 2010 Championship of the Americas Tournament in Rio de Janeiro, with a total score of 179 targets, earning him a spot on the Brazilian team for the Olympics.

Fuzaro represented Brazil at the 2012 Summer Olympics in London, where he competed in the men's double trap. He scored a total of 131 targets in the qualifying rounds by two points behind U.S. shooter Joshua Richmond from the final attempt, finishing only in seventeenth place.
