= Rahi Sarnobat =

Indian sport shooter (born 1990)

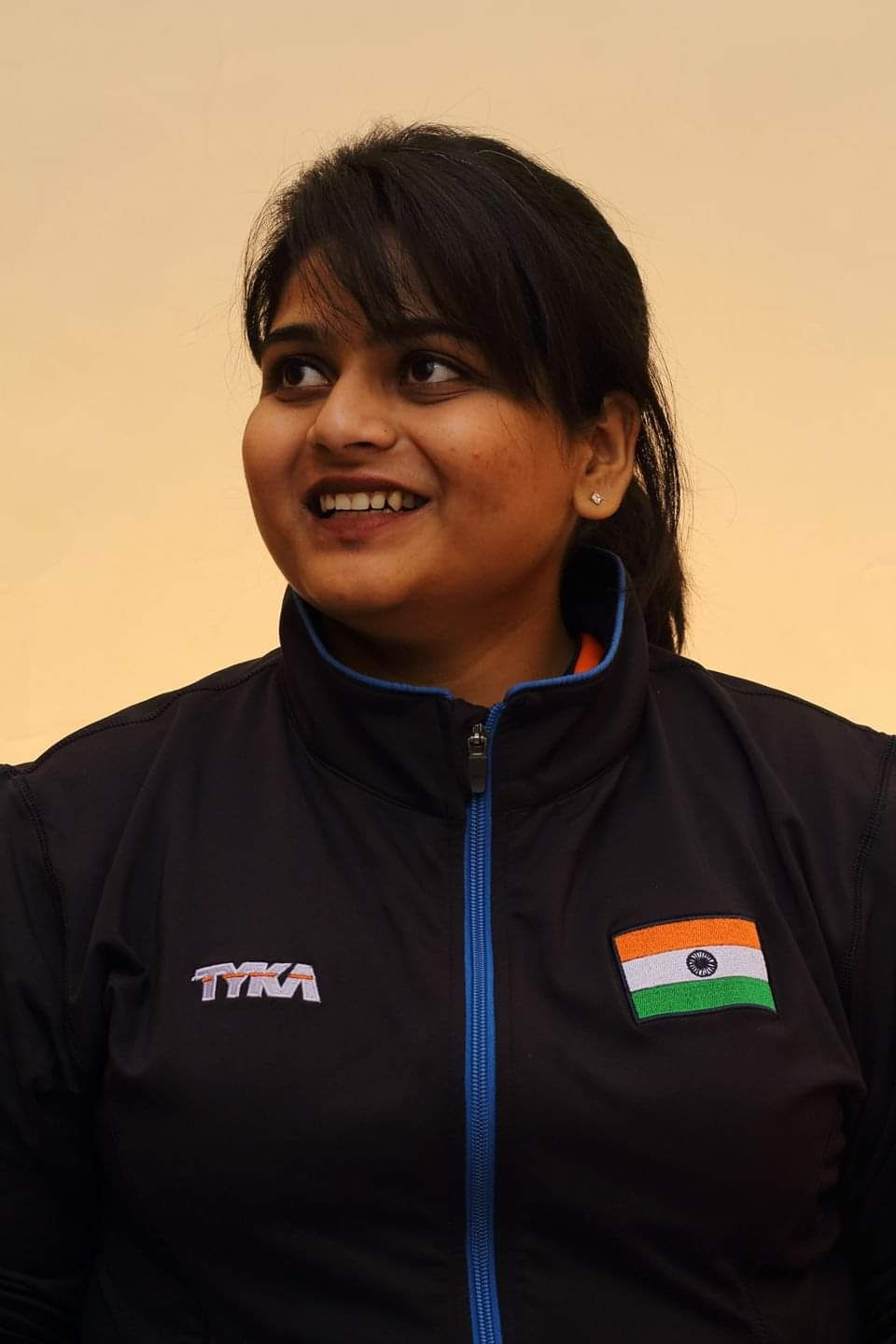
- Sarnobat in 2021

Personal information
- Full name: Rahi Jeevan Sarnobat
- Born: 30 October 1990 (age 35) Kolhapur, Maharashtra, India
- Height: 1.57 m (5 ft 2 in)

Sport
- Sport: Shooting
- Event: 25 m pistol
- Coached by: Munkhbayar Dorjsuren

Achievements and titles
- Highest world ranking: 1 (2021)
Medal record
Women's 25 m pistol shooting
Representing India
Asian Games
Gold medal – first place	2018 Palembang	Individual
Bronze medal – third place	2014 Incheon	Team
Asian Championships
Silver medal – second place	2013 Tehran	Team
Commonwealth Games
Gold medal – first place	2010 Delhi	Pairs
Gold medal – first place	2014 Glasgow	Individual
Silver medal – second place	2010 Delhi	Individual
South Asian Games
Gold medal – first place	2016 Guwahati	Individual
Gold medal – first place	2016 Guwahati	Team
World Cup
Gold medal – first place	2013 Changwon	Individual
Gold medal – first place	2019 Munich	Individual
Gold medal – first place	2021 Osijek	Individual
Gold medal – first place	2021 New Delhi	Team
Gold medal – first place	2022 Cairo	Team
Silver medal – second place	2021 New Delhi	Individual
Bronze medal – third place	2011 Fort Benning	Individual
Bronze medal – third place	2021 Osijek	Team
Commonwealth Youth Games
Gold medal – first place	2008 Pune	Individual

Rahi Jeevan Sarnobat (born 30 October 1990) is an Indian sport shooter who specialises in the 25 m pistol event. She is the first Indian woman to win an individual gold medal in shooting at the Asian Games, winning the 25 m pistol event at the 2018 Asian Games. She also won gold medals at the 2010 and 2014 Commonwealth Games.

== Early life ==
Sarnobat hails from Kolhapur in Maharashtra. During her school days, she was introduced to firearms as part of NCC training. She demonstrated natural skills in using firearms from an early age. But her interest in shooting as a sport grew when her school senior Tejaswini Sawant won the gold medal in shooting at the 2006 Commonwealth Games. In her early days of the sport, Sarnobat had to navigate inadequate infrastructure and facilities in her home town of Kolhapur. She then decided to train in Mumbai, which had better facilities.

She completed her Bachelor of Business Administration in 2010 from Vivekanand College, Shivaji University. She is currently employed with the Government of Maharashtra as the deputy collector (revenue).

== Career ==
Sarnobat first shot to prominence after winning a gold medal at the 2008 Commonwealth Youth Games in Pune in the 25 m pistol event.

She won the gold medal in the 25 m pistol pairs event with Anisa Sayyed besides a silver in the individual event, at the 2010 Commonwealth Games in Delhi.

She won the bronze medal in the 25 m pistol event at the 2011 World Cup in Fort Benning, fetching her an Olympic quota, making her the first Indian woman to qualify for the Olympics in the 25 m pistol event.

At the 2012 London Olympics, she finished 19th in the qualification round of the 25 m pistol event and did not advance into the final.

She became India's first pistol shooter to win a gold medal in the World Cup, when she won the 25 m pistol event at the 2013 World Cup in Changwon. At the 2013 Asian Championships in Tehran, she won the silver medal in the 25 m pistol team event, alongside Anisa Sayyed and Surabhi Pathak.

At the 2014 Commonwealth Games in Glasgow, she won gold in the 25 m pistol event. Later that year, she won the bronze medal in the 25 m pistol team event at the 2014 Asian Games in Incheon, where she teamed up with Anisa Sayyed and Heena Sidhu.

An injury caused by an accident in 2015 came as a setback for Sarnobat, it affected her elbow which took almost two years to fully heal. She made it back to the Indian national team and started working with German coach Munkhbayar Dorjsuren, who helped Sarnobat gain physical fitness and mental strength. Ironically, Dorjsuren was one of her competitors at the 2012 London Olympics.

At the 2016 South Asian Games in Guwahati, she won gold in the 25 m pistol individual and team event alongside Anisa Sayyed and Annu Raj Singh.

She became the first Indian woman to win a shooting gold at the Asian Games after winning the 25 m pistol event at the 2018 Asian Games in Palembang. She shot a score of 34 in the final to tie with Thailand's Naphaswan Yangpaiboon who won silver after a shoot-off.

She won the gold medal in the 25 m pistol event at the 2019 World Cup in Munich, winning India a quota place for the Tokyo Olympics.

Olympic-bound Sarnobat won the silver medal in the 25 m pistol event at the 2021 World Cup in New Delhi, and later a gold in the same event at the World Cup in Osijek. At the Tokyo Olympics, she finished 32nd among 44 shooters in the 25 m pistol qualification and failed to make the cut for the medal round.

== Awards ==
- Arjuna Award, 2018
