= Júlio Almeida =

Brazilian sport shooter (born 1969)

Personal information
- Full name: Júlio Antonio de Souza e Almeida
- Born: 23 September 1969 (age 56) Rio de Janeiro, Brazil
- Height: 1.80 m (5 ft 11 in)
- Weight: 90 kg (198 lb)

Sport
- Country: Brazil
- Sport: Shooting
- Event(s): 10 m air pistol (AP60); 25 m rapid fire pistol (RFP); 50 m pistol (FP)
- Club: Caça e Tiro Dias Velho
- Coached by: Silvio Aguiar
Medal record
Men's shooting
Representing Brazil
World Championships
Gold medal – first place	2010 Munich	25 m center fire pistol team
Gold medal – first place	2018 Changwon	25 m center fire pistol
Silver medal – second place	2010 Munich	25 m center fire pistol
Bronze medal – third place	2010 Munich	25 m standard pistol
Bronze medal – third place	2014 Granada	25 m standard pistol team
Pan American Games
Gold medal – first place	2015 Toronto	50 m pistol
Silver medal – second place	1995 Mar de Plata	25 m center fire pistol
Silver medal – second place	2007 Rio de Janeiro	10 m air pistol
Bronze medal – third place	2011 Guadalajara	10 m air pistol
Bronze medal – third place	2011 Guadalajara	50 m pistol
Bronze medal – third place	2019 Lima	10 m air pistol
South American Games
Gold medal – first place	2010 Medellín	10 m air pistol
Gold medal – first place	2010 Medellín	25 m standard pistol
Gold medal – first place	2010 Medellín	50 m pistol
Gold medal – first place	2010 Medellín	Team 10 m air pistol
Gold medal – first place	2010 Medellín	Team 25 m standard pistol
Gold medal – first place	2010 Medellín	Team 50 m pistol
Bronze medal – third place	2014 Santiago	25 m rapid fire pistol
Military World Games
Gold medal – first place	2015 Mungyeong	25 m center fire pistol team

Júlio Antonio de Souza e Almeida (born 23 September 1969) is a Brazilian sport shooter. Almeida had won a total of four medals (two silver and two bronze) in pistol shooting at the Pan American Games (1995 in Mar de Plata, Argentina, 2007 in Rio de Janeiro, and 2011 in Guadalajara, Mexico). He also captured a silver and a bronze medal in centre-fire and standard pistol at the 2010 ISSF World Shooting Championships in Munich, Germany, with scores of 586 and 574, respectively.

At age thirty-nine, Almeida made his official debut for the 2008 Summer Olympics in Beijing, where he competed in three pistol shooting events. He scored a total of 580 targets in the preliminary rounds of the men's 10 m air pistol, by one point behind Armenia's Norayr Bakhtamyan from the final attempt, finishing only in thirteenth place. Three days later, Almeida placed eighteenth in his second event, 50 m rifle pistol, by three points ahead of Italy's Francesco Bruno, with a total score of 554 targets. For his third and final event, 25 m rapid fire pistol, Almeida was able to shoot a total of 568 targets (284 each on the first and second stage) in the preliminary rounds, finishing only in eleventh place by four points behind China's Liu Zhongsheng.
