= Bernardo Tobar Prado =

Colombian sports shooter

Personal information
- Full name: Bernardo Julian Tobar Prado
- Nationality: Colombian
- Born: 14 December 1977 (age 48) Popayán, Colombia
- Height: 1.65 m (5 ft 5 in)
- Weight: 70 kg (154 lb)

Sport
- Country: Colombia
- Sport: Shooting
Medal record
Men's shooting
Representing Colombia
Event	1st	2nd	3rd
CAC Games	0	1	2
South American Games	0	0	2
Total	0	1	4
Central American and Caribbean Games
Silver medal – second place	2006 Cartagena	25 m rapid fire pistol team
Bronze medal – third place	2018 Barranquilla	25 m rapid fire pistol
Bronze medal – third place	2018 Barranquilla	25 m rapid fire pistol team
South American Games
Bronze medal – third place	2010 Medellín	25 m rapid fire pistol
Bronze medal – third place	2010 Medellín	25 m rapid fire pistol team

Bernardo Tobar Prado (born 14 December 1977) is a Colombian sports shooter. He competed in the men's 25 metre rapid fire pistol event at the 2020 Summer Olympics.
