= Shooting at the 2010 South American Games – Men's 50m pistol =

The Men's 50m pistol event at the 2010 South American Games was held on March 23, with the qualification at 9:00 and the Finals at 12:00.

== Individual ==
=== Medalists ===
Gold	Silver	Bronze
Júlio Almeida; Brazil	Marco Antonio Nunez; Venezuela	Rafael Alberto Araus; Argentina

=== Results ===
==== Qualification ====
Rank	Athlete	Series						Total	Shoot-off
Rank	Athlete	1	2	3	4	5	6	Total	Shoot-off
1	Júlio Almeida (BRA)	95	94	88	91	96	91	555	
2	Rafael Alberto Araus (ARG)	88	93	88	89	90	93	541	
3	Marco Antonio Nunez (VEN)	92	85	90	93	86	89	535	
4	Rudolf Cordero (BOL)	91	84	86	95	88	89	533	
5	Enrique Luis Braschi (PER)	92	88	91	85	91	85	532	
6	Manuel Benjamin Maturana (CHI)	88	89	85	91	89	87	529	
7	Tulio Gomes (BRA)	91	87	86	85	92	87	528	
8	Jorge Enrique Silva (COL)	87	89	92	86	82	89	525	
9	Maximino Tomas Modesti (ARG)	88	80	92	95	85	84	524	
10	Martin Ivan Boluarte (PER)	87	87	90	90	85	79	518	
10	Frank Bonilla (VEN)	90	78	90	91	89	80	518	
12	Juan Fernando Jaramillo (COL)	86	79	87	83	90	92	517	
13	Luis Alberto Suarez (ECU)	85	87	80	88	82	86	508	

==== Final ====
Rank	Athlete	Qual Score	Final Score	Total	Shoot-off
1st place, gold medalist(s)	Júlio Almeida (BRA)	555	90.3	645.3	
2nd place, silver medalist(s)	Marco Antonio Nunez (VEN)	535	95.9	630.9	
3rd place, bronze medalist(s)	Rafael Alberto Araus (ARG)	541	89.6	630.6	
4	Rudolf Cordero (BOL)	533	87.8	620.8	
5	Manuel Benjamin Maturana (CHI)	529	90.2	619.2	
6	Tulio Gomes (BRA)	528	88.7	616.7	
7	Enrique Luis Braschi (PER)	532	83.3	615.3	
8	Jorge Enrique Silva (COL)	525	90.2	615.2	

== Team ==
=== Medalists ===
Gold	Silver	Bronze
Júlio Almeida; Tulio Gomes; Brazil	Rafael Alberto Araus; Maximino Tomas Modesti; Argentina	Marco Antonio Nunez; Frank Bonilla; Venezuela

=== Results ===
Rank	Athlete	Series						Total
Rank	Athlete	1	2	3	4	5	6	Total
1st place, gold medalist(s)	Brazil							1083
1st place, gold medalist(s)	Júlio Almeida (BRA)	95	94	88	91	96	91	555
1st place, gold medalist(s)	Tulio Gomes (BRA)	91	87	86	85	92	87	528
2nd place, silver medalist(s)	Argentina							1065
2nd place, silver medalist(s)	Rafael Alberto Araus (ARG)	88	93	88	89	90	93	541
2nd place, silver medalist(s)	Maximino Tomas Modesti (ARG)	88	80	92	95	85	84	524
3rd place, bronze medalist(s)	Venezuela							1053
3rd place, bronze medalist(s)	Marco Antonio Nunez (VEN)	92	85	90	93	86	89	535
3rd place, bronze medalist(s)	Frank Bonilla (VEN)	90	78	90	91	89	80	518
4	Peru							1050
4	Enrique Luis Braschi (PER)	92	88	91	85	91	85	532
4	Martin Ivan Boluarte (PER)	87	87	90	90	85	79	518
5	Colombia							1042
5	Jorge Enrique Silva (COL)	87	89	92	86	82	89	525
5	Juan Fernando Jaramillo (COL)	86	79	87	83	90	92	517
