= Shooting at the 2010 South American Games – Men's 10m air pistol =

The Men's 10m air pistol event at the 2010 South American Games was held on March 22, with the qualification at 8:00 and the Finals at 11:00.

== Individual ==
=== Medalists ===
Gold	Silver	Bronze
Júlio Almeida; Brazil	Frank Bonilla; Venezuela	Manuel Benjamin Maturana; Chile

=== Results ===
==== Qualification ====
Rank	Athlete	Series						Total	Shoot-off
Rank	Athlete	1	2	3	4	5	6	Total	Shoot-off
1	Júlio Almeida (BRA)	93	95	97	95	98	96	574	
2	Frank Bonilla (VEN)	91	92	96	96	96	96	567	
3	Matias Gustavo Orozco (ARG)	94	95	96	96	92	93	566	
4	Maximino Modesti (ARG)	93	97	93	94	93	94	564	
4	Marco Antonio Nuñez (VEN)	94	92	95	96	94	93	564	
6	Mario Enrique Delgado (ECU)	94	91	94	94	92	96	561	
6	Manuel Benjamin Maturana (CHI)	94	94	97	91	91	94	561	
6	Felipe Almeida Wu (BRA)	90	93	94	95	96	93	561	
6	Rudolf Cordero (BOL)	96	93	91	95	97	89	561	
10	Philip Elhage (AHO)	94	94	90	96	93	93	560	
10	Jorge Enrique Silva (COL)	93	90	91	94	95	97	560	
12	Martin Ivan Boluarte (PER)	93	96	88	91	94	96	558	
12	Enrique Luis Braschi (PER)	96	89	94	93	93	93	558	
12	Juan Fernando Jaramillo (COL)	90	911	94	93	95	95	558	
15	Luis Alberto Suarez (ECU)	89	92	95	94	93	93	556	
16	Diego Andres Quiroga (BOL)	95	86	88	89	90	91	539	
	Oscar Raul Contreras (PAR)							DSQ	
	Clayton Granville (AHO)							DNS	

==== Final ====
Rank	Athlete	Qual Score	Final Score	Total	Shoot-off
1st place, gold medalist(s)	Júlio Almeida (BRA)	574	98.5	672.5	
2nd place, silver medalist(s)	Frank Bonilla (VEN)	567	99.99	666.9	
3rd place, bronze medalist(s)	Manuel Benjamin Maturana (CHI)	561	99.7	660.7	
4	Mario Enrique Delgado (ECU)	561	98.1	659.1	10.6
5	Maximino Modesti (ARG)	564	95.1	659.1	9.3
6	Felipe Almeida Wu (BRA)	561	95.9	656.9	
7	Marco Antonio Nuñez (VEN)	564	91.1	655.1	
8	Matias Gustavo Orozco (ARG)	566	0.0	DSQ	

== Team ==
=== Medalists ===
Gold	Silver	Bronze
Júlio Almeida; Felipe Almeida Wu; Brazil	Frank Bonilla; Marco Antonio Nuñez; Venezuela	Matias Gustavo Orozco; Maximino Modesti; Argentina

=== Results ===
Rank	Athlete	Series						Total
Rank	Athlete	1	2	3	4	5	6	Total
1st place, gold medalist(s)	Brazil							1135
1st place, gold medalist(s)	Júlio Almeida (BRA)	93	95	97	95	98	96	574
1st place, gold medalist(s)	Felipe Almeida Wu (BRA)	90	93	94	95	96	93	561
2nd place, silver medalist(s)	Venezuela							1131
2nd place, silver medalist(s)	Frank Bonilla (VEN)	91	92	96	96	96	96	567
2nd place, silver medalist(s)	Marco Antonio Nuñez (VEN)	94	92	95	96	94	93	564
3rd place, bronze medalist(s)	Argentina							1130
3rd place, bronze medalist(s)	Matias Gustavo Orozco (ARG)	94	95	96	96	92	93	566
3rd place, bronze medalist(s)	Maximino Modesti (ARG)	93	97	93	94	93	94	564
4	Colombia							1118
4	Jorge Enrique Silva (COL)	93	90	91	94	95	97	560
4	Juan Fernando Jaramillo (COL)	90	911	94	93	95	95	558
5	Ecuador							1117
5	Mario Enrique Delgado (ECU)	94	91	94	94	92	96	561
5	Luis Alberto Suarez (ECU)	89	92	95	94	93	93	556
6	Peru							1116
6	Martin Ivan Boluarte (PER)	93	96	88	91	94	96	558
6	Enrique Luis Braschi (PER)	96	89	94	93	93	93	558
7	Bolivia							1100
7	Rudolf Cordero (BOL)	96	93	91	95	97	89	561
7	Diego Andres Quiroga (BOL)	95	86	88	89	90	91	539
