= Shooting at the 2014 South American Games =

- Dates: March 12–18

The shooting Competitions at the 2014 South American Games took place at the Polideportivo Viña in Viña del Mar, Chile from March 12 to 18. There were 14 competitions, nine for men and five for women. The winner of each tournament qualifies to compete at the 2015 Pan American Games in Toronto, Canada, with each athlete only able to claim one quota.

== Medal summary ==
=== Men's events ===
- **Athletes in bold** have qualified a quota for the 2015 Pan American Games

Event	Gold	Silver	Bronze
10 metre air pistol	**Felipe Almeida Wu**; Brazil	Frank Bonilla; Venezuela	Rudolf Knijnenburg; Bolivia
10 metre air rifle	**Bruno Heck**; Brazil	Julio Iemma; Venezuela	Elias San Martin; Chile
25 metre rapid fire pistol	**Emerson Duarte**; Brazil	Juan Pablo Savarino; Argentina	Júlio Almeida; Brazil
50 metre pistol	**Manuel Sánchez Maturana**; Chile	Stênio Akira; Brazil	Rudolf Knijnenburg; Bolivia
50 metre rifle prone	**Rosendo Velarte**; Argentina	Leonardo Vagner; Brazil	Cassio Cesar; Brazil
50 metre rifle three positions	**Martrin Gutierrez**; Venezuela	Juan Angeloni; Argentina	Elias San Martin; Chile
Trap	**Danilo Caro**; Colombia	Roberto Schmits; Brazil	Leonel Martinez; Venezuela
Double trap	**Asier Cilloniz**; Peru	Jaison Sandro; Brazil	Franco Di Mauro; Venezuela
Skeet	**Nicolás Pacheco**; Peru	Federico Gil; Argentina	Jorge Moya; Chile

=== Women's events ===
Event	Gold	Silver	Bronze
10 metre air pistol	**Maribel Pineda**; Venezuela	Marina Perez; Ecuador	Maria Pia Herrera; Argentina
10 metre air rifle	**Dairene Marquez**; Venezuela	Rosa Amelia Fournel; Argentina	Maria De Los Reyes Cardellino; Argentina
25 metre pistol	**Brianda Rivera**; Peru	Miriam Quintanillia; Peru	Maria Cardellino; Venezuela
50 metre rifle three positions	**Diliana Méndez**; Venezuela	Sofia Padilla; Ecuador	Rosane Ewald; Brazil
Skeet	**Daniela Carraro**; Brazil	Francisca Crovetto; Chile	Melisa Gil; Argentina
