= Shooting at the 2010 South American Games – Men's double trap =

The Men's double trap event at the 2010 South American Games was held on March 24 at 9:00.

== Individual ==
=== Medalists ===
Gold	Silver	Bronze
Filipe Fuzaro; Brazil	Asier Josu Parodi; Peru	Cesar David Flores; Bolivia

=== Results ===
==== Qualification ====
Rank	Athlete	Series			Total	Shoot-off
Rank	Athlete	1	2	3	Total	Shoot-off
1	Asier Josu Parodi (PER)	41	45	40	126	
2	Filipe Fuzaro (BRA)	40	43	40	123	
3	Juan Carlos Gacha (BOL)	42	39	38	119	
4	Jaison Santin (BRA)	39	43	37	119	
5	Cesar David Flores (BOL)	42	40	37	119	
6	Francisco Juan Dibos (PER)	35	41	38	114	1
7	Michel Daou (AHO)	35	41	38	114	0
8	Hernando Ignacio Camerano (COL)	41	33	39	113	
9	Luis Alfredo Salcedo (COL)	39	35	38	112	
10	Mario Soarez (VEN)	43	35	33	111	
11	Humberto Oliveiro (VEN)	29	32	36	97	

==== Final ====
Rank	Athlete	Qual Score	Final Score	Total	Shoot-off
1st place, gold medalist(s)	Filipe Fuzaro (BRA)	123	40	163	
2nd place, silver medalist(s)	Asier Josu Parodi (PER)	126	36	162	
3rd place, bronze medalist(s)	Cesar David Flores (BOL)	119	40	159	1
4	Jaison Santin (BRA)	119	40	159	0
5	Juan Carlos Gacha (BOL)	119	39	158	
6	Francisoc Juan Dibos (PER)	114	34	148	

== Team ==
=== Medalists ===
Gold	Silver	Bronze
Filipe Fuzaro; Jaison Santin; Brazil	Asier Josu Parodi; Francisco Juan Dibos; Peru	Juan Carlos Gacha; Cesar David Flores; Bolivia

=== Results ===
Rank	Athlete	Series			Total
Rank	Athlete	1	2	3	Total
1st place, gold medalist(s)	Brazil				242
1st place, gold medalist(s)	Filipe Fuzaro (BRA)	40	43	40	123
1st place, gold medalist(s)	Jaison Santin (BRA)	39	43	37	119
2nd place, silver medalist(s)	Peru				240
2nd place, silver medalist(s)	Asier Josu Parodi (PER)	41	45	40	126
2nd place, silver medalist(s)	Francisco Juan Dibos (PER)	35	41	38	114
3rd place, bronze medalist(s)	Bolivia				238
3rd place, bronze medalist(s)	Juan Carlos Gacha (BOL)	42	39	38	119
3rd place, bronze medalist(s)	Cesar David Flores (BOL)	42	40	37	119
4	Colombia				225
4	Hernando Ignacio Camerano (COL)	41	33	39	113
4	Luis Alfredo Salcedo (COL)	39	35	38	112
5	Venezuela				208
5	Mario Soarez (VEN)	43	35	33	111
5	Humberto Oliveiro (VEN)	29	32	36	97
