= Malaika Goel =

Indian sport shooter (born 1997)

Personal information
- Nationality: India
- Born: 23 October 1997 (age 28) Amritsar, Punjab, India
- Height: 173 cm (5 ft 8 in) (2014)
- Weight: 78 kg (172 lb) (2014)
Medal record
Representing India
Women's shooting
Commonwealth Games
Silver medal – second place	2014 Glasgow	10m Air Pistol

Malaika Goel (born 23 October 1997) is an Indian shooter. She won the silver medal in the Women's 10m Air Pistol competition at the 2014 Commonwealth Games in Glasgow, Scotland. She was the youngest medallist.

== Career ==
By the age of 20, Goel had grabbed as many as 16 international medals. She started her shooting career in 2008. In 2012, Goel won a silver medal at the senior national championships in the 10 meter Air Pistol competition. In the same year, she also won a silver at the Asian Air Gun Championships in China in the juniors category. In its 2013 event held in Tehran, Goel scoring 197.7 points won the gold medal in the Youth section.

In the 2014 Commonwealth Games, she won the silver medal, having scored 197.1 points. She left behind Dorothy Ludwig of Canada with bronze medal. She also won a bronze at the Asian Championships in Kuwait in 2014. At the 59th National Shooting Championship in 2015 in New Delhi, she earned the bronze medal in the 10-metre air pistol event. Goel's coach are Mohinder Lal and Gurjeet Singh.

== Personal life ==
Goel stopped going to school when she was in Class VI. At 16 years old, the teenager already had a deep love for shooting unlike other teenagers who were addicted to social media and cellphones. Her father is a police officer in Punjab.
