= Juan Angeloni =

Argentine rifle shooter (born 1978)

Personal information
- Born: 24 June 1978 (age 48) Rosario del Tala, Argentina

Sport
- Sport: Rowing
Medal record
Representing Argentina
Pan American Games
| Bronze medal – third place | 2007 Rio de Janeiro | 50m rifle 3 positions |
South American Games
| Silver medal – second place | 2010 Medellin | 50m rifle 3 positions team |
| Silver medal – second place | 2014 Santiago | 50m rifle 3 positions |
| Bronze medal – third place | 2010 Medellin | 50m rifle 3 positions |

Juan Diego Angeloni (born 24 June 1978) is an Argentine rifle shooter. He competed in the 50 m rifle prone event at the 2012 Summer Olympics, where he placed 50th and last. He won the bronze medal at the 2007 Pan American Games.
