= Dina Aspandiyarova =

Sports shooter

Medal record

Representing Kazakhstan

Women's shooting

Asian Games
Gold medal – first place	1998 Bangkok	Women's 10 metre air pistol singles

Representing Australia

Women's shooting

Commonwealth Games
Gold medal – first place	2006 Melbourne	Women's 10 metre air pistol pairs
Silver medal – second place	2006 Melbourne	Women's 10 metre air pistol
Silver medal – second place	2010 New Delhi	Women's 10 metre air pistol pairs
Bronze medal – third place	2010 New Delhi	Women's 10 metre air pistol singles

Dina Aspandiyarova (born 10 July 1976 in Almaty, Kazakhstan) is a professional sporting shooter who has previously represented Kazakhstan and Russia and currently represents Australia in international competition. Aspandiyarova is from Kazakh descent.

Aspandiyarova competed at the 2000 Summer Olympics in Sydney where she finished 6th in the women's 10 metre air pistol. She moved to Russia with husband Anatoly Babushkin in 2001 and moved to Australia in 2003 when Babushkin was appointed Australian national shooting coach. She missed out on selection in the Russian team for the 2004 Summer Olympics and the following year became an Australian citizen.

She competed at the 2008 Summer Olympics in Beijing where she placed 33rd in the women's 25 metre pistol and 36th in the women's 10m air pistol.

She competed at the 2010 Commonwealth Games in Delhi, winning two medals.

She was selected for the Australian team for the 2012 Summer Olympics in London, and finished in 14th place in the women's 10 metre air pistol event.

She qualified to represent Australia at the 2020 Summer Olympics. She competed in the individual and team 10m air pistol events. She did not score sufficient points to advance past qualification. Detailed results can be found in Australia at the 2020 Summer Olympics.
