= Brenda Shinn =

American sport shooter

Brenda Shinn (Silva)
Personal information
- Nationality: United States
- Born: Brenda Martin; January 1, 1962 (age 64) Redondo Beach, California
- Height: 1.55 m (5 ft 1 in)
- Weight: 68 kg (150 lb)

Sport
- Sport: Shooting
- Events: 10 m air pistol (AP40); 25 m pistol (SP)
- Coached by: Gary Spychalski

Achievements and titles
- National finals: National Champion 2008 Air Pistol, 2009 Air Pistol, 2014 NRA Women's Camp Perry, 2015 Sport Pistol
- Highest world ranking: 10th World Cup USA, Sport Pistol

Brenda Shinn (born January 1, 1962, in Redondo Beach, California) is an American sport shooter. She won the gold medal for the women's air pistol at the 2009 USA Shooting National Championships in Fort Benning, Georgia, and achieved a seventh-place finish in the same category at the 2010 Championships of the Americas (CAT Games) in Rio de Janeiro, Brazil.

== Shooting career ==
Shinn started out her sporting career at the age of seventeen, while learning shooting at the Orange County Sheriff’s Explorer program. She won the 1980 National Police Explorer Pistol Match, and had an invitation to train at the U.S. Olympic Training Center in Colorado Springs, Colorado, where she switched from competing in the two-handed .38 category to the air pistol. In 1982, Shinn placed eleventh for her category at the USA Shooting National Championships, and eventually joined the Orange County Sheriff's Department Pistol Team, where she shot for three years as a distinguished master. Shinn stopped competitive shooting in 1987, when she gave birth to her only son K.C.

Following her son's birth, Shinn worked full-time as a lieutenant with the Riverside County Sheriff’s Department at Jurupa Valley Patrol Station. She also graduated from Chapman University in 1998 with a bachelor's degree in criminal justice, and again in 2002 with a master's degree in organizational leadership.

Shinn returned to competitive shooting in 2006, when her son K.C. attended the California State University in San Bernardino, California. Since then, she had won numerous medals in shooting competitions, including the bronze for the air pistol at the 2007 USA Shooting National Championships.

Shinn qualified for the women's 10 m air pistol, as a 46-year-old, at the 2008 Summer Olympics in Beijing, by placing second from the U.S. Olympic Team Trials in Fort Benning, Georgia, behind Beki Snyder. She finished only in thirty-seventh place by two points behind Japan's Michiko Fukushima from the final attempt, for a total score of 373 targets.
