= Amanda Mondol =

Colombian sport shooter (born 1965)

Personal information
- Full name: Amanda Haydee Mondol Cuellar
- Nationality: Colombia
- Born: 10 January 1965 (age 61) Bogotá, Colombia
- Height: 1.67 m (5 ft 5 1/2 in)
- Weight: 54 kg (119 lb)

Sport
- Sport: Shooting
- Event(s): 10 m air pistol (AP40); 25 m pistol (SP)
- Club: Target Bogotá
- Coached by: Luis Boduero
Medal record
Representing Colombia
Women's shooting
Event	1st	2nd	3rd
Pan American Games	0	2	1
CAC Games	2	2	3
South American Games	0	2	3
Total	2	6	7
Pan American Games
Silver medal – second place	1995 Mar del Plata	10 m air pistol team
Silver medal – second place	2003 Santo Domingo	10 m air pistol
Bronze medal – third place	1991 Havana	25 m pistol team
Central American and Caribbean Games
Gold medal – first place	2006 Cartagena	25 m pistol
Gold medal – first place	2010 Mayagüez	25 m pistol team
Silver medal – second place	2010 Mayagüez	25 m pistol
Silver medal – second place	2010 Mayagüez	10 m air pistol team
Bronze medal – third place	2006 Cartagena	10 m air pistol team
Bronze medal – third place	2014 Veracruz	10 m air pistol
Bronze medal – third place	2014 Veracruz	25 m pistol
South American Games
Silver medal – second place	2006 Buenos Aires	25 m pistol team
Silver medal – second place	2010 Medellín	25 m pistol
Bronze medal – third place	2010 Medellín	10 m air pistol
Bronze medal – third place	2010 Medellín	25 m pistol team
Bronze medal – third place	2018 Cochabamba	25 m pistol

Amanda Haydee Mondol Cuellar (born January 10, 1965, in Bogotá) is a Colombian sport shooter. She earned a silver medal in the air pistol at the 2003 Pan American Games in Santo Domingo, Dominican Republic, and was selected to compete for Colombia, as the oldest female athlete (aged 39), at the 2004 Summer Olympics. Mondol is also a full-time member of Target Shooting Club in her native Bogotá, under her personal coach Luis Boduero.

Mondol qualified for the Colombian squad in pistol shooting at the 2004 Summer Olympics in Athens, by having attained a mandatory Olympic standard of 373 and claiming the silver medal in the air pistol from the 2003 Pan American Games in Santo Domingo, Dominican Republic. Mondol started off her Olympic run by firing 368 points to finish in a thirty-fifth place tie with three other shooters in the 10 m air pistol prelims. On her second event, 25 m pistol, Mondol registered 293 points in three precision series and 284 in the rapid fire stage to accumulate an overall record of 577 and improve her feat with a thirteenth-place effort, narrowly missing out the final round by a three-point shortfall.
