= Lynda Kiejko =

Canadian sport shooter

Personal information
- Born: 13 September 1980 (age 45) Winchester, Ontario, Canada

Sport
- Sport: Pistol shooting
Medal record
Representing Canada
Pan American Games
| Gold medal – first place | 2015 Toronto | 10m air pistol |
| Gold medal – first place | 2015 Toronto | 25m pistol |
Commonwealth Games
| Bronze medal – third place | 2010 Delhi | 10 metre air pistol pairs |

Lynda Kiejko (née Hare born 13 September 1980 in Winchester, Ontario, Canada) is a Canadian pistol sport shooter.

Kiejko started off 2015 with a career high 6th-place finish at a World Cup event in Changwon, South Korea in the 10m air pistol event and then later won two gold medals at the 2015 Pan American Games in Toronto, and therefore secured a quota place for the 2016 Summer Olympics. She follows in the footsteps of her sister Dorothy Ludwig, who qualified for the 2012 Summer Olympics.

In May 2016, she was officially named to Canada's team for the 2016 Olympics. She finished in 38th place in both the Women's 10 metre air pistol and the Women's 25 metre pistol events.

She represented Canada at the 2020 Summer Olympics.

Her father, Bill Hare, was a three-time Olympian in shooting for Canada.
