= Daniel César Felizia =

Argentine sports shooter (born 1962)

Personal information
- Nationality: Argentina
- Born: 6 April 1962 (age 64) San Francisco, Argentina

Sport
- Sport: Olympic shooting
Medal record
Representing Argentina
Men's Shooting
Pan American Games
Gold medal – first place	1999 Winnipeg	25m pistol
Silver medal – second place	1995 Mar del Plata	25m standard pistol team
Bronze medal – third place	1991 Havana	25m pistol team
Bronze medal – third place	1995 Mar del Plata	25m centre fire pistol team
South American Games
Gold medal – first place	2010 Medellín	25m pistol
Gold medal – first place	2010 Medellín	25m pistol team
Bronze medal – third place	2010 Medellín	25m standard pistol

Cesar Daniel Felizia (born 6 April 1962) is an Argentine athlete specialising in Olympic shooting. He was double South American champion in 2010 South American Games. He also competed at the 1984 Summer Olympics and the 2000 Summer Olympics.

== Career ==
The sporting career of Cesar Daniel Felizia is identified by its participation in the following national and international events:

For the eighth time, he was the athlete with the highest number of medals from Argentina in Games Medellin 2010. His performance in the ninth edition of the games, was identified as the 87th athlete with the highest number of medals to all participants of the event, with a total of 3 medals:

- Gold: Shooting 25m Pistol Men Fast
- Gold: Sport Shooting 25m Pistol Men Shooting Team Fast
- Bronze: Sport Shooting Men's 25m Standard Pistol
