= Denys Kushnirov =

Ukrainian sport shooter (born 1992)

Denys Kushnirov (born 12 December 1992 in Kryvyi Rih) is a Ukrainian sport shooter who competes in the men's 10 metre air pistol. At the 2012 Summer Olympics, he finished 18th in the qualifying round, failing to make the cut for the final.
