= Carolina Lozado =

Uruguayan pistol shooter (born 1971)

Personal information
- Nationality: Uruguay
- Born: 7 May 1971 (age 55)
- Height: 1.73 m (5 ft 8 in)
- Weight: 66 kg (146 lb)

Sport
- Sport: Shooting
- Event: 10 m air pistol

Carolina Lozado (born May 7, 1971) is a Uruguayan pistol shooter. At age thirty-seven, Lozado made her official debut for the 2008 Summer Olympics in Beijing, where she competed in the women's 10 m air pistol shooting. She finished only in forty-third place for the qualifying rounds, with a total score of 367 points.
