= Julia Lydall =

British sport shooter

Personal information
- National team: United Kingdom; England
- Born: Haywards Heath
- Height: 170 cm (5 ft 7 in)
- Other interests: Modern Pentathlon

Sport
- Country: United Kingdom; England
- Sport: Shooting sports
- Events: 10 metre air pistol; 25 metre sport pistol
- Club: British Pistol Club
- Coached by: Tom Redhead; Margaret Thomas; Steve Pengelly
Medal record
Women's shooting
Representing England
Commonwealth Games
Bronze medal – third place	2006 Melbourne	10 meters air pistol pairs
Bronze medal – third place	2010 Delhi	25 metres pistol pairs

Julia Lydall (born 16 May 1986) is a British sport shooter who has won two bronze medals at the Commonwealth Games. She represented Great Britain at the 2006 World Shooting Championships in Zagreb.

== Early life ==
Lydall was born in Haywards Heath, West Sussex. She has a degree in quantity surveying.

== Sporting career ==
At the 2006 Commonwealth Games held in Melbourne, Australia, Lydall won the bronze medal in the 10m air pistol pairs with Georgina Geikie.

In 2008 with Georgina Geikie and Kathryn Pearson she set a new British Team Record for Women's Air Pistol of 1128 at the InterShoot competition in the Netherlands.

She competed for England at the 2010 Commonwealth Games held in Delhi, India. Again partnered with Geikie, the pair repeated their result at the 2006 Games by winning a bronze medal in the 25m pistol pairs with a score of 1122 points.
