= Lee Jung-eun (sport shooter) =

South Korean sport shooter

Personal information
- Nationality: South Korean
- Born: 2 May 1987 (age 39)

Sport
- Country: South Korea
- Sport: Shooting
- Event: Air pistol
Medal record
World Championships
Silver medal – second place	2018 Changwon	25 m team pistol

Lee Jung-eun (born 2 May 1987) is a South Korean sport shooter.

She participated at the 2018 ISSF World Shooting Championships, winning a medal.
