= Ana Paula Mello =

Brazilian volleyball player (born 1961)

Personal information
- Born: 10 October 1961 (age 63); Belo Horizonte, Brazil

Sport
- Sport: Volleyball

Ana Paula Mello (born 10 October 1961) is a Brazilian volleyball player. She competed in the women's tournament at the 1980 Summer Olympics.
