= Teo Shun Xie =

Singaporean sport shooter

Personal information
- Full name: Teo Shun Xie
- Born: 30 September 1988 (age 38) Singapore
- Height: 168 cm (5 ft 6 in)
- Weight: 68 kg (150 lb)

Sport
- Sport: Shooting
- Events: 10 m air pistol (AP40); 25 m pistol (SP)
- Coached by: Zhen Tingling
Medal record
Women's shooting
Representing Singapore
Asian Airgun Championships
| Bronze medal – third place | 2022 Daegu | 10 m air pistol team |
Commonwealth Games
| Gold medal – first place | 2014 Glasgow | AP40 |
Southeast Asia Games
| Gold medal – first place | 2015 Singapore | 10 metre air pistol |

Teo Shun Xie (born 30 September 1988) is a Singaporean sport shooter. In 2014, Teo set a final meet record in the women's air pistol to claim her first gold medal at the Commonwealth Games.

Teo trains for the Singaporean national team under coach Anatoly Babushkin.

Teo made her international debut at the 2013 Southeast Asian Games in Naypyidaw, Myanmar, claiming the silver medal in the women's 10 m air pistol. Teo's success in marksmanship came at the Commonwealth Games in Glasgow, Scotland by the following year. There, she notched the final Games record score of 198.6 points ahead of India's Malaika Goel and Canada's 2012 Olympian Dorothy Ludwig to win her first gold medal in the women's air pistol.

When Singapore hosted the 2015 Southeast Asian Games, Teo scored 199.0 in the air pistol final by a 2.3-point lead over Thailand's Pim-on Klaisuban to win the gold medal.

Leading up to her Olympic debut, Teo had finished sixth with 12 points in the semifinal stage of the women's sport pistol (25 m), but managed to secure one of the available berths to the Games for Singapore at the 2016 Asian Olympic Shooting Qualifying Tournament in New Delhi, India.

At the Rio Olympics 2016, she clinched the 37th place for the 10m Women's Air Pistol event and 29th place for the 25m Women's Air Pistol event.

In 2022, Teo won the women's 25m pistol event at the International Shooting Sport Federation (ISSF) Grand Prix held at Jakarta, Indonesia.
