= Kwak Jung-hye =

South Korean sports shooter

Personal information
- Nationality: South Korean
- Born: 곽정혜; 19 November 1986 (age 39) Jeju, South Korea
- Height: 1.64 m (5 ft 5 in)
- Weight: 64 kg (141 lb)

Sport
- Country: South Korea
- Sport: Sports shooting
- Event: Air pistol
Medal record
Women's shooting
Representing South Korea
World Championships
Silver medal – second place	2018 Changwon	10 m team air pistol
Silver medal – second place	2018 Changwon	25 m team pistol
Asian Championships
Bronze medal – third place	2012 Doha	10 m air pistol team

Kwak Jung-hye (born 19 November 1986) is a South Korean sports shooter. She competed in the women's 10 metre air pistol event at the 2016 Summer Olympics.
