= Dorothy Ludwig =

Canadian sport shooter

Personal information
- Born: January 16, 1979 (age 47) Renfrew, Ontario

Sport
- Country: Canada
- Sport: Shooting
Medal record
Commonwealth Games
Gold medal – first place	2002 Manchester	10 m air pistol pairs
Silver medal – second place	2002 Manchester	10 m air pistol
Bronze medal – third place	2010 Delhi	10 m air pistol pairs
Bronze medal – third place	2014 Glasgow	10 m air pistol
Pan American Games
Gold medal – first place	2011 Guadalajara	10 m air pistol

Dorothy Ludwig (born January 16, 1979) is a Canadian shooter from Renfrew, Ontario. She currently resides in Langley, British Columbia. Ludwig first won a bronze medal in pairs shooting at the 2010 Commonwealth Games. In 2011, she won Canada's second gold medal at the Pan American Games in Guadalajara, claiming a spot on the 2012 Olympic team. At the 2012 Olympics, she finished in 34th place in 10 m air pistol.
