= Lê Thị Hoàng Ngọc =

Vietnamese sport shooter

Personal information
- Nationality: Vietnamese
- Born: 1 July 1982 (age 44)

Sport
- Country: Vietnam
- Sport: Shooting

Lê Thị Hoàng Ngọc (born 1 July 1982 in Hưng Yên) is a Vietnamese sport shooter. At the 2012 Summer Olympics, she competed in the Women's 10 metre air pistol, finishing in 21st place, and the women's 25 metre pistol, finishing in 32nd place.
