= Anisa Sayyed =

Indian sport shooter

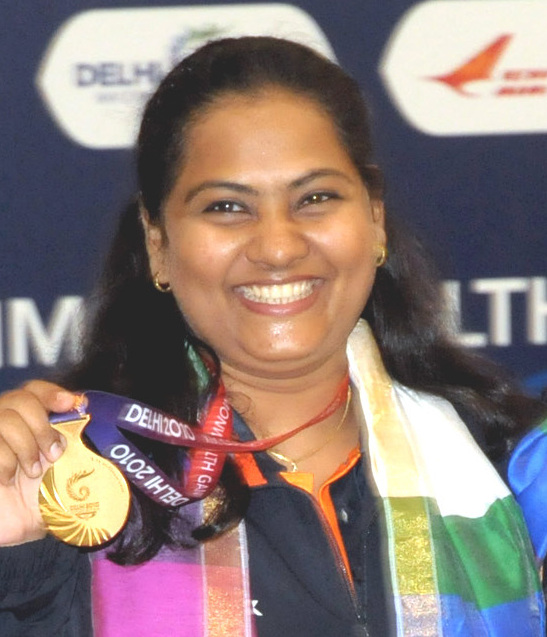
- Anisa Sayyed with the gold medal in 25M Pistol Women (Pair) event, at the XIX Commonwealth Games-2010, Delhi

Personal information
- Born: 22 September 1980 (age 46) Wai, Maharashtra, India
- Height: 157 cm (5 ft 2 in)
- Weight: 90 kg (198 lb)
- Spouse: Mubarak Hussain

Sport
- Sport: Shooting
- Event: 25 meter pistol
Medal record
Representing India
Commonwealth Games
Gold medal – first place	2010 Delhi	25 m pistol pairs
Gold medal – first place	2010 Delhi	25 m pistol
Silver medal – second place	2014 Glasgow	25 m pistol
Asian Games
Bronze medal – third place	2014 Incheon	25 m pistol team
NSCC
Gold medal – first place	2017 Trivandram	25 m pistol team

Anisa Sayyed (born 22 September 1980) is an Indian female pistol shooter who won two gold medals in 2010 Commonwealth Games. She also won a gold medal at the South Asian Games in 2006. At the 2014 Commonwealth Games, she won a silver in the 25m event. In addition, she won a bronze in the 2014 Asian Games. She set a new national record by winning a gold medal in women's 25m air pistol at the National Shooting Championship Competition in 2017.

== Early life ==
Originally belonging to Khadki, in the Satara district of Pune, Anisa is the daughter of Abdul Hameed Sayyed and is the youngest of four siblings. Her father who was a former club-level football player, used to work as a clerk at Telco. Anisa developed an interest in shooting while training for the National Cadet Corps (NCC), in college. She was awarded the title of best NCC shooter in her school life.

== Career ==
Anisa used to work for the Lady Hawabhai School as a primary teacher. She later started working for the Indian Railways as a Ticket-Collector on the busy Mumbai-Pune Railway route at Vile Parle railway station of Maharashtra. She resigned from her job after being repeatedly denied transfer to her home town (Pune).

Anisha's shooting career began in 2002 under the guidance of Gani Sheikh and P.V.Inamdar. Anisa won her first gold medal in the 25m pistol event while pairing with Rahi Sarnobat. She also won the silver medal in the women's 25 metre pistol event of the Commonwealth Games at the Barry Buddon Shooting Centre near Glasgow on June 26, 2014. National Coach Sunny Thomas taught her some special techniques before the 2010 commonwealth games.

Anisa won the individual gold medal with a score of 776.5 at the Commonwealth Games itself. She also won the gold medal in South Asian Games in 2006. In 2014, she won the silver medal for the 25-metre pistol shooting at the Commonwealth Games at Glasgow. Anisa is supported by Anglian Medal Hunt Company. She set out to create a new national record in 2017 at the National Shooting Championship Competition in the 25m pistol shooting category.

== Controversy ==
She was promised a job after a winning streak at various Shooting championships both in India and abroad but she did not get any job. The state government instead asked her to go back to her sport.

In November 2017, she filed a complaint of harassment against the senior officials at the state sports department where she was employed. She said that her salary was not paid for past two years and neither was her leave for subsequent games duly sanctioned by the authority. Addressed to Haryana's director of sports and youth affairs, she expressed her disagreement with the state which promised to provide her with necessary amenities to continue with her sport along with her job.

== Personal life ==
Anisa is married to Mubarak Khan, and they have a daughter born in 2017. The couple presently live in Faridabad district of Haryana.
