= 2015 Oceania Shooting Championships =

Sports shooting championship

Oceania Shooting Federation Championships
- Host city: Sydney, Australia
- Organisers: Commonwealth Shooting Federation; Shooting Australia
- Edition: 14
- Dates: 25 November - 2 December
- Main venue: Sydney International Shooting Centre

The 2015 Oceania Shooting Championships took place from 25 November - 2 December 2015, at Sydney International Shooting Centre, Sydney, Australia. They were hosted by Shooting Australia on behalf of the Oceania Shooting Federation.

The Championships acted as the Oceanian qualifying tournament for the 2016 Summer Olympic Games in Rio de Janeiro.

== Medal summary ==
=== Men ===
Event	Gold	Silver	Bronze
10 m air pistol	Blake Blackburn; Australia	Daniel Repacholi; Australia	Chris Sumerell; Australia
10 m air pistol team	Australia; Chris Sumerell; Blake Blackburn; Daniel Repacholi	New Zealand; Ricky Zhao; Thomas Nobes; Jason Wakeling	Australia; Damian Dowling; Jason Faulkner; Bailey Groves
25 m center fire pistol	Gary Mullens; Australia	Jason Wakeling; New Zealand	Gerald Nobes; New Zealand
25 m center fire pistol team	Australia; Gary Mullens; Kerry Bell; Mike Giustiniano	New Zealand; Jason Wakeling; Gerald Nobes; Terry Johnson	New Caledonia; Johan Perchard; Frederic Cannella; Christophe Cheung
25 m rapid fire pistol	Sergei Evglevski; Australia	Bruce Quick; Australia	David Chapman; Australia
25 m rapid fire pistol team	Australia; David Chapman; Sergei Evglevski; Bruce Quick	Australia; Scott Anderson; Bailey Groves; Mike Giustiniano	New Caledonia; Johan Perchard; Frederic Cannella; Christophe Cheung
50 m pistol	Daniel Repacholi; Australia	Thomas Nobes; New Zealand	Ricky Zhao; New Zealand
50 m pistol team	Australia; Daniel Repacholi; Damian Dowling; Jason Faulkner	Australia; Bruce Quick; Bailey Groves; Mike Knapp	New Zealand; Ricky Zhao; Terry Johnson; Thomas Nobes
10 m air rifle	Jack Rossiter; Australia	Dane Sampson; Australia	William Godward; Australia
10 m air rifle team	Australia; Jack Rossiter; Dane Sampson; William Godward	New Zealand; Owen Bennett; Rory Mcleod; Ian Irvine	Australia; Nicholas Ioakim; Daniel Clopatofsky; Michael Nicholas
50 m rifle prone	Dane Sampson; Australia	Ryan Taylor; New Zealand	Frederyk Woodhouse; Australia
50 m rifle prone team	Australia; James Daly; Barry Cowburn; Warren Potent	Australia; Dane Sampson; Frederyk Woodhouse; Andrew Sevelj	New Zealand; Ryan Taylor; Martin Hunt; Grant Taylor
50 m rifle 3 positions	Dane Sampson; Australia	William Godward; Australia	Daniel Clopatofsky; Australia
50 m rifle 3 positions team	Australia; Dane Sampson; William Godward; Daniel Clopatofsky	New Zealand; Rory Mcleod; Owen Bennett; Ian Irvine	Australia; Nicholas Ioakim; Andrew Sevelj; Michael Nicholas
Trap	Adam Vella; Australia	Glenn Kable; Fiji	Jack Wallace; Australia
Trap team	Australia; Adam Vella; Mitchell Iles-Crevatin; Jack Wallace	Australia; Michael Coles; Thomas Grice; James Grice	New Zealand; Myles Browne-Cole; Owen Robinson; Graeme Ede
Skeet	Keith Ferguson; Australia	James Bolding; Australia	Paul Adams; New Zealand
Skeet team	Australia; Keith Ferguson; James Bolding; Paul Adams	Australia; Joshua Bell; Richard Sammon; Mathew Costa	New Zealand; Paul Wilson; Geoffrey Jukes; Barry Washbourne

=== Women ===
Event	Gold	Silver	Bronze
10 m air pistol	Lalita Yauhleuskaya; Australia	Lucy Philips; New Zealand	Jocelyn Lees; New Zealand
10 m air pistol team	Australia; Lalita Yauhleuskaya; Kristy Gillman; Emily Esposito	Australia; Elena Galiabovitch; Hayley Chapman; Sue Guy	New Zealand; Andrea Bald; Jocelyn Lees; Lucy Philips
25 m pistol	Elena Galiabovitch; Australia	Linda Ryan; Australia	Lalita Yauhleuskaya; Australia
25 m pistol team	Australia; Elena Galiabovitch; Linda Ryan; Lalita Yauhleuskaya	Australia; Kristy Gillman; Hayley Chapman; Una Rossetto	New Zealand; Jocelyn Lees; Lucy Philips; Kay Perrett
10 m air rifle	Jennifer Hens; Australia	Maria Rebling; Australia	Emma Woodroofe; Australia
10 m air rifle team	Australia; Jennifer Hens; Emma Woodroofe; Maria Rebling	New Zealand; Jenna Mackenzie; Roberta Wadsworth; Bronwyn Shields	Australia; Alyce Devlin; Tamsyn Henry; Rachael Ross
50 m rifle prone	Susannah Smith; Australia	Sally Johnston; New Zealand	Jenna Mackenzie; New Zealand
50 m rifle prone team	New Zealand; Sally Johnston; Jenna Mackenzie; Denva Wren	New Zealand; Janet Hunt; Allison Archer; Jackie Lindsay	Australia; Susannah Smith; Chloe Romanoff; Kimberley Payne
50 m rifle 3 positions	Emma Woodroofe; Australia	Jenna Mackenzie; New Zealand	Sally Johnston; New Zealand
50 m rifle 3 positions team	Australia; Emma Woodroofe; Susannah Smith; Tamsyn Henry	New Zealand; Jenna Mackenzie; Sally Johnston; Denva Wren	Only 2 teams participated
Trap	Natalie Rooney; New Zealand	Emma Cox; Australia	Catherine Skinner; Australia
Skeet	Chloe Tipple; New Zealand	Laura Coles; Australia	Aislin Jones; Australia
Skeet team	Australia; Aislin Jones; Laura Coles; Suzie Balogh	New Zealand; Chloe Tipple; Amy van Bysterveldt; Rachael van Bysterveldt	Only 2 teams participated

== Medal table ==
* Host nation (Australia)

Rank	Nation	Gold	Silver	Bronze	Total
1	Australia*	38	23	21	82
2	New Zealand	4	17	14	35
3	French Polynesia	4	1	2	7
4	New Caledonia	0	3	3	6
5	Papua New Guinea	0	1	1	2
6	Fiji	0	1	0	1
7	Guam	0	0	0	0
7	Samoa	0	0	0	0
Totals (8 entries)		46	46	41	133
