= 2019 Oceania Shooting Championships =

Sports shooting championship

Oceania Shooting Federation Championships
- Host city: Sydney, Australia
- Organisers: Commonwealth Shooting Federation; Shooting Australia
- Edition: 16
- Dates: 1-9 November
- Main venue: Sydney International Shooting Centre

The 2019 Oceania Shooting Championships took place from 3 to 8 November 2019, at Sydney International Shooting Centre, Sydney, Australia. They were hosted by Shooting Australia on behalf of the Oceania Shooting Federation.

The Championships acted as the Oceanian qualifying tournament for the 2020 Summer Olympic Games in Tokyo.

== Medal summary ==
=== Men ===
Event	Gold	Silver	Bronze
10 m air pistol	Bailey Groves; Australia	Scott Anderson; Australia	Daniel Repacholi; Australia
10 m air pistol team	Australia; Bailey Groves; Daniel Repacholi; Scott Anderson	Australia; Damian Dowling; Gaurav Pilaniya; Bruce Quick	New Zealand; Ricky Zhao; Thomas Nobes; Gerald Nobes
25 m rapid fire pistol	Sergei Evglevski; Australia	Thomas Ashmore; Australia	Thomas Nobes; New Zealand
25 m rapid fire pistol team	Australia; Sergei Evglevski; Thomas Ashmore; Bruce Quick	Australia; Chris Mamouzelos; Scott Anderson; Bailey Groves	New Zealand; Thomas Nobes; Ricky Zhao; Gerald Nobes
50 m pistol	Ricky Zhao; New Zealand	Thomas Nobes; New Zealand	Bruce Quick; Australia
50 m pistol team	Australia; Bruce Quick; Damian Dowling; Kerry Bell	New Zealand; Ricky Zhao; Thomas Nobes; Gerald Nobes	Only 2 teams participated
10 m air rifle	Alex Hoberg; Australia	Jack Rossiter; Australia	Dane Sampson; Australia
10 m air rifle team	Australia; Jack Rossiter; Dane Sampson; Alex Hoberg	New Zealand; Owen Bennett; Adrian Black; Shaun Jeffery	Australia; Michael Davis; Benjamin Holko; Michael Nicholas
50 m rifle prone	Martin Hunt; New Zealand	Owen Bennett; New Zealand	Alex Hoberg; Australia
50 m rifle prone team	New Zealand; Martin Hunt; Owen Bennett; Chris Harrison	Australia; Alex Hoberg; Jack Rossiter; David Wright	Australia; Andrew Sevelj; Dane Sampson; Michael Davis
50 m rifle 3 positions	Jack Rossiter; Australia	Alex Hoberg; Australia	Owen Bennett; New Zealand
50 m rifle 3 positions team	Australia; Jack Rossiter; Alex Hoberg; Michael Davis	Australia; Andrew Sevelj; Dane Sampson; Michael Nicholas	New Zealand; Owen Bennett; Adrian Black; Shaun Jeffery
Trap	Mitchell Iles; Australia	Daniel di Pietro; Australia	Owen Robinson; New Zealand
Trap team	Australia; Adam Vella; Mitchell Iles; Daniel di Pietro	Australia; Todd Malone; Craig Henwood; Thomas Grice	New Zealand; Myles Browne-Cole; Owen Robinson; James Mackie
Skeet	Paul Adams; Australia	Joshua Bell; Australia	Paul Wilson; New Zealand
Skeet team	Australia; Frank Morris; Keith Ferguson; James Bolding	Australia; Paul Adams; Joshua Bell; Luke Argiro	New Zealand; Paul Wilson; Stephen Speers; Barry Washbourne

=== Women ===
Event	Gold	Silver	Bronze
10 m air pistol	Danielle Moleman; Australia	Dina Aspandiyarova; Australia	Kayla Aylward; New Zealand
10 m air pistol team	Australia; Dina Aspandiyarova; Civon Smith; Danielle Moleman	Australia; Lara Cowling; Alison Heinrich; Elena Galiabovitch	New Zealand; Lauren Mungo; Kayla Aylward; Samantha Nobes
25 m pistol	Elena Galiabovitch; Australia	Alison Heinrich; Australia	Civon Smith; Australia
25 m pistol team	Australia; Elena Galiabovitch; Alison Heinrich; Civon Smith	Australia; Danielle Moleman; Una Rossetto; Sue Guy	New Zealand; Samantha Nobes; Kayla Aylward; Brenna Adams
10 m air rifle	Victoria Rossiter; Australia	Elise Collier; Australia	Emma Adams; Australia
10 m air rifle team	Australia; Victoria Rossiter; Emma Adams; Elise Collier	Australia; Katarina Kowplos; Maria Rebling; Emma Woodroofe	New Zealand; Jessica Burgess-Smith; Jessica Riddle; Sarah Reesby
50 m rifle prone	Sally Johnston; New Zealand	Susannah Smith; Australia	Shania Harrison-Lee; New Zealand
50 m rifle prone team	New Zealand; Shania Harrison-Lee; Rachel McLaren; Kirsten Birrell	New Zealand; Sally Johnston; Denva Wren; Janet Hunt	Australia; Susannah Smith; Elise Collier; Jacqui Hatzigiannis
50 m rifle 3 positions	Emma Adams; Australia	Elise Collier; Australia	Jessica Burgess-Smith; New Zealand
50 m rifle 3 positions team	Australia; Tamsyn Henry; Katarina Kowplos; Maria Rebling	Australia; Emma Adams; Elise Collier; Emma Woodroofe	New Zealand; Jessica Burgess-Smith; Sally Johnston; Denva Wren
Trap	Natalie Rooney; New Zealand	Lisa Smith; Australia	Breanna Collins; Australia
Trap team	Australia; Charlie Hudson-Czerniecki; Renae Jones; Georgia Pistone	Australia; Lisa Smith; Breanna Collins; Stephanie Pile	New Zealand; Natalie Rooney; Selena Yang; Chloe Tipple
Skeet	Chloe Tipple; New Zealand	Laura Coles; Australia	Aislin Jones; Australia
Skeet team	Australia; Laura Coles; Aislin Jones; Cherie Reeves	New Zealand; Chloe Tipple; Maggie Hood; Georgia Washbourne	Only 2 teams participated

== Medal table ==
* Host nation (Australia)

Rank	Nation	Gold	Silver	Bronze	Total
1	Australia*	23	24	11	58
2	New Zealand	7	6	17	30
Totals (2 entries)		30	30	28	88
