= Shooting at the 2018 Commonwealth Games – Men's 10 metre air rifle =

Men's 10 metre air rifle at the 2018 Commonwealth Games
- Venue: Belmont Shooting Centre, Brisbane
- Dates: 8 April
- Competitors: 18 from 12 nations

Medalists
gold medal	Dane Sampson	Australia
silver medal	Abdullah Hel Baki	Bangladesh
bronze medal	Ravi Kumar	India

The Men's 10 metre air rifle event at the 2018 Commonwealth Games are being held on 8 April at the Belmont Shooting Centre, Brisbane. There will be a qualification to determine the final participant.

== Results ==
=== Qualification ===
Rank	Name	1	2	ex 1-2	3	ex 1-3	4	ex 1-4	5	ex 1-5	6	Points	Notes
1	Deepak Kumar (IND)	104.7	103.8	208.5	104.9	313.4	104.2	417.6	104.8	522.4	104.8	627.2	Q
2	Ravi Kumar (IND)	103.3	105.6	208.9	104.0	312.9	105.4	418.3	104.3	522.6	104.2	626.8	Q
3	Dane Sampson (AUS)	102.9	104.7	207.6	103.9	311.5	104.3	415.8	103.6	519.4	103.8	623.2	Q
4	Mohamad Irwan Rahman (SGP)	102.7	102.4	205.1	102.9	308.0	102.3	410.3	105.5	515.8	103.2	619.0	Q
5	Michael Bamsey (WAL)	102.7	104.0	206.7	103.9	310.6	103.7	414.3	102.0	516.3	101.0	617.3	Q
6	Abdullah Hel Baki (BAN)	99.7	102.4	202.1	102.6	304.7	103.9	408.6	104.1	512.7	103.3	616.0	Q
7	Alex Hoberg (AUS)	102.9	102.0	204.9	101.6	306.5	103.1	409.6	101.4	511.0	104.3	615.3	Q
8	Dean Bale (ENG)	102.2	102.8	205.0	103.7	308.7	101.0	409.7	101.9	511.6	103.5	615.1	Q
9	Muhammad Ezuan Nasir Khan (MAS)	101.2	101.7	202.9	103.7	306.6	103.1	409.7	102.1	511.8	102.8	614.6	
10	Ghufran Adil (PAK)	103.6	100.5	204.1	102.8	306.9	101.2	408.1	104.1	512.2	101.7	613.9	
11	Bartholomeus Pienaar (RSA)	103.9	103.1	207.0	101.7	308.7	102.2	410.9	101.8	512.7	100.0	612.7	
12	Emmanuel En Yue Chan (SGP)	102.6	102.5	205.1	100.6	305.7	101.6	407.3	102.3	509.6	102.7	612.3	
13	Cameron Pirouet (JER)	100.1	102.2	202.3	99.3	301.6	102.3	403.9	102.8	506.7	102.2	608.9	
14	Mohammad Rabbi Munna (BAN)	103.4	101.9	205.3	101.4	306.7	101.5	408.2	98.4	506.6	101.0	607.6	
15	Pierre Basson (RSA)	101.4	100.4	201.8	100.0	301.8	101.5	403.3	100.3	503.6	101.1	604.7	
16	Alexandros Christoforou (CYP)	98.3	99.6	197.9	100.8	298.7	101.6	400.3	102.6	502.9	100.7	603.6	
17	Gulraaj Sehmi (KEN)	96.9	100.9	197.8	99.9	297.7	97.6	395.3	101.2	496.5	102.0	598.5	
18	Gurupreet Dhanjal (KEN)	96.6	97.6	194.2	101.1	295.3	95.0	390.3	98.6	488.9	98.2	587.1	

=== Finals ===
Rank	Name	1	2	1-2	3	1-3	4	1-4	5	1-5	6	1-6	7	1-7	8	1-8	9	1-9	Points	Notes
1st place, gold medalist(s)	Dane Sampson (AUS)	50.8	51.1	101.9	20.3	122.4	19.8	142.2	21.1	163.3	21.1	184.4	20.3	204.7	20.4	225.1	19.9	245.0	245.0	GR
2nd place, silver medalist(s)	Abdullah Hel Baki (BAN)	50.8	50.6	101.4	21.4	122.8	20.6	143.4	20.0	163.4	20.1	183.5	21.3	204.8	19.8	224.6	20.1	244.7	244.7	
3rd place, bronze medalist(s)	Ravi Kumar (IND)	49.6	50.9	100.5	21.2	121.7	21.7	143.4	20.4	163.8	20.3	184.1	20.5	204.6	19.5	224.1	-	-	224.1	
4	Alex Hoberg (AUS)	51.8	51.5	103.3	19.5	122.8	20.9	143.7	19.1	162.8	20.7	183.5	21.1	204.6	-	-	-	-	204.6	SO
5	Michael Bamsey (WAL)	50.5	51.2	101.7	20.6	122.3	19.9	142.2	20.7	162.9	20.2	183.1	-	-	-	-	-	-	183.1	
6	Deepak Kumar (IND)	49.2	52.1	101.3	20.0	121.3	20.9	142.2	20.1	162.3	-	-	-	-	-	-	-	-	162.3	
7	Dean Bale (ENG)	49.8	51.5	101.3	21.2	122.5	19.4	141.9	-	-	-	-	-	-	-	-	-	-	141.9	
8	Mohamad Irwan Rahman (SGP)	48.6	52.3	100.9	19.0	119.9	-	-	-	-	-	-	-	-	-	-	-	-	119.9	
