= Shooting at the 2014 Commonwealth Games – Men's skeet =

Shooting – Men's skeet at the 2014 Commonwealth Games
- Venue: Barry Buddon Shooting Centre
- Dates: 25–26 July 2014
- Competitors: 29 from 19 nations

Medalists
gold medal	Georgios Achilleos	Cyprus
silver medal	Drew Christie	Scotland
bronze medal	Rory Warlow	England

The Men's skeet eventtook place on 25 and 26 July 2014 at the Barry Buddon Shooting Centre. There was a qualification event to determine the final participants.

== Results ==
=== Qualification ===
Rank	Name	1	2	3	4	5	Points	Notes
1	Georgios Achilleos (CYP)	24	25	25	25	23	122	Q
2	Paul Adams (AUS)	25	25	23	24	24	121	Q
3	Andreas Chasikos (CYP)	25	23	23	25	24	120	Q
4	Drew Christie (SCO)	24	25	24	24	23	120	Q
5	Malcolm Allen (WAL)	23	24	24	23	25	119	Q
6	Rory Warlow (ENG)	23	24	24	24	23	118	Q
7	Mairaj Ahmad Khan (IND)	24	23	23	22	25	117	
8	Jason Caswell (CAN)	23	24	24	24	22	117	
9	Keith Ferguson (AUS)	21	24	24	23	23	115	
10	Rhys Price (WAL)	24	23	22	25	20	114	
11	Eddie Mclean (CAY)	21	22	22	24	24	113	
12	Guy Douglas Jack (KEN)	22	21	23	24	23	113	
13	Usman Chand (PAK)	20	23	24	23	23	113	
14	Michael Gilligan (ENG)	22	21	24	21	24	112	
15	David Christie (NIR)	23	20	24	24	21	112	
16	David Clague (IOM)	22	22	24	23	20	111	
17	Clement Buchanan (NIR)	24	24	21	18	21	108	
18	Noor Salim (BAN)	21	23	21	20	22	107	
19	Baba Bedi (IND)	22	21	21	21	20	105	
20	Andrew Schirn (CAY)	20	20	21	21	21	103	
21	James Bradley (IOM)	19	21	22	18	22	102	
22	Iqbal Islam (BAN)	21	21	19	15	23	99	
23	Joon Kit Joseph Lee (MAS)	17	23	17	20	21	98	
24	Chee Fei Ricky Teh (MAS)	15	17	20	17	19	88	
25	Mitchell Meers (NFI)	14	15	16	16	15	76	
26	Matthew Vincent (FAI)	12	13	20	14	16	75	
27	Bill Burton (NFI)	12	17	14	13	14	70	
−	Shaun Barnes (JAM)	−	−	−	−	−	−	DNS
−	Morgan Magatogia (NIU)	−	−	−	−	−	−	DNS

=== Semi-finals ===
Rank	Name	Points	Notes
1	Georgios Achilleos (CYP)	14	QG
2	Drew Christie (SCO)	13	QG
3	Rory Warlow (ENG)	12	QB
4	Andreas Chasikos (CYP)	12	QB
5	Malcolm Allen (WAL)	11	
6	Paul Adams (AUS)	11	

=== Finals ===
Rank	Name	Points	Notes
1st place, gold medalist(s)	Georgios Achilleos (CYP)	14	
2nd place, silver medalist(s)	Drew Christie (SCO)	6	
3rd place, bronze medalist(s)	Rory Warlow (ENG)	14	
4	Andreas Chasikos (CYP)	13	
