= Elise Collier =

Australian sports shooter (born 1998)

Personal information
- Nationality: Australian
- Born: 10 July 1998 (age 27) Melbourne, Victoria

Sport
- Sport: Sports shooting
Medal record
Women's shooting
Representing Australia
Oceania Shooting Championships
Silver medal – second place	2019 Sydney	10m air rifle
Silver medal – second place	2019 Sydney	10m air rifle team
Silver medal – second place	2019 Sydney	50m rifle 3 positions
Bronze medal – third place	2019 Sydney	50m rifle prone team

Elise Collier (born 10 July 1998) is an Australian sports shooter who is also a current national record holder in women's 10m air rifle. She specialised in the sport of shooting following an accident which fractured her skull. She made her debut appearance at the Olympics representing Australia at the 2020 Summer Olympics.

== Biography ==
Collier was born in Melbourne, Victoria and was raised up in Victoria. She spent most of her childhood time going outdoors hiking and mountain biking. She also excelled as a junior cricketer during her young age and went on to play for Ormond Cricket Club boys' team and later for the Victoria state team.

In December 2011, she was accidentally hit on the back of the head by a ball during a fielding drill. She was admitted to the hospital but left shortly afterwards. Three days later, she featured in another match where she collapsed on the field in the process. She was rushed to the hospital again and was identified with a broken skull. As a result, she temporarily lost her sight for a few days after the accident and also suffered from uncontrolled movements on her right arm. In addition, she also suffered a temporary deafness in her right ear and reportedly lost the sense of smell and taste for about six months. Her sight returned after a few days but she was left with a severe headache which lasted for months. The headache also significantly hampered her progress when she was still schooling and endured difficulties in concentrating the lessons, reading books and writing notes when holding a pen.

== Career ==
Her father advised her to take up the sport of shooting in 2014 as a rehabilitation in order to distract herself from the pain by focusing on the sport. She pursued her career in shooting only in 2017 following the influence and suggestion of her father. She joined the Frankston Peninsula Target Rifle Club to pursue her career in rifle shooting. She began preparing to compete at international competitions in the 10m air rifle discipline recognised by the International Shooting Sport Federation. In 2015, she won the Sporting Shooters Association Australia Victorian Junior Field Rifle Championship.

Collier represented Australia at the 2019 Oceania Shooting Championships which also marked her debut appearance at the Oceania Shooting Championships. During the tournament, she claimed a total of five medals including two silver medals in 10m air rifle events.

She rose to limelight after breaking a world record in the 10 m air rifle during the Olympic qualifying competition in April 2020. However, her record was not recognized due to the status of the competition and instead was counted only as an Australian national record in the relevant discipline.

Collier represented Australia at the 2020 Summer Olympics in Tokyo, Japan. She competed in the women's 10 metre air rifle and mixed 10 metre air rifle team events. She did not score sufficient points in either event to advance past qualification.
