= 2017 Commonwealth Shooting Championships =

- Host city: Brisbane, Australia
- Dates: 28 October - 8 November 2017
- Main venue: Belmont Shooting Centre

The 2017 Commonwealth Shooting Federation Championships were held at the Belmont Shooting Complex in Brisbane, Australia from 28 October to 8 November 2017. It was held in tandem with that year's Oceania Shooting Championships and served as a test event for the 2018 Commonwealth Games.

== Medalists ==
=== Men ===
Event	Gold	Silver	Bronze
10 m air pistol	Shahzar Rizvi; India	Omkar Singh; India	Jitu Rai; India
25 m rapid fire pistol	Sergei Evglevski; Australia	Anish Bhanwala; India	Neeraj Kumar; India
50 m pistol	Prakash Nanjappa; India	Amanpreet Singh; India	Jitu Rai; India
10 m air rifle	Alex Hoberg; Australia	Jack Rossiter; Australia	Deepak Kumar; India
50 m rifle prone	Dane Sampson; Australia	Gagan Narang; India	Swapnil Kusale; India
50 m rifle 3 positions	Satyendra Singh; India	Sanjeev Rajput; India	Dane Sampson; Australia
Skeet	Ben Llewellin; Wales	Jack Fairclough; England	Paul Adams; Australia
Trap	Aaron Heading; England	Michael Wixey; Wales	James Willett; Australia
Double trap	Ankur Mittal; India	Matthew French; England	Nathan-Lee Xuereb; Malta

=== Women ===
Event	Gold	Silver	Bronze
10 m air pistol	Heena Sidhu; India	Elena Galiabovitch; Australia	Kristy Gillman; Australia
25 m pistol	Lalita Yauhleuskaya; Australia	Elena Galiabovitch; Australia	Annu Raj Singh; India
10 m air rifle	Pooja Ghatkar; India	Anjum Moudgil; India	Martina Veloso; Singapore
50 m rifle prone	Jennifer McIntosh; Scotland	Seonaid McIntosh; Scotland	Anjum Moudgil; India
50 m rifle 3 positions	Seonaid McIntosh; Scotland	Katie Gleeson; England	Martina Veloso; Singapore
Skeet	Amber Hill; England	Chloe Tipple; New Zealand	Aislin Jones; Australia
Trap	Laetisha Scanlan; Australia	Penny Smith; Australia	Natalie Rooney; New Zealand
Double trap	Emma Cox; Australia	Shreyasi Singh; India	Rachel Parish; England

=== Open ===
Event	Gold	Silver	Bronze
Fullbore individual	David Luckman; England	Petrus Haasbroek; South Africa	Jim Bailey; Australia
Fullbore pairs	England; David Luckman; Parag Patel	Australia; Ben Emms; Jim Bailey	Scotland; Ian Shaw; Alexander Walker

== Medal table ==
* Host nation (Australia)

Rank	Nation	Gold	Silver	Bronze	Total
1	India	6	7	7	20
2	Australia*	6	5	6	17
3	England	4	3	1	8
4	Scotland	2	1	1	4
5	Wales	1	1	0	2
6	New Zealand	0	1	1	2
7	South Africa	0	1	0	1
8	Singapore	0	0	2	2
9	Malta	0	0	1	1
Totals (9 entries)		19	19	19	57
