= Shooting at the 2018 Summer Youth Olympics – Boys' 10 metre air rifle =

Boys' 10 metre air rifle at the III Summer Youth Olympic Games
- Venue: Parque Sarmiento
- Dates: 7 October
- Competitors: 20 from 20 nations

Medalists
1st place, gold medalist(s)		Grigorii Shamakov	Russia
2nd place, silver medalist(s)		Shahu Tushar Mane	India
3rd place, bronze medalist(s)		Aleksa Mitrović	Serbia

These are the results for the boys' 10 metre air rifle event at the 2018 Summer Youth Olympics.

== Results ==
=== Qualification ===
Rank	Name	Nation	1	2	3	4	5	6	Points	Notes
1	Amirsiyavash Zolfagharian	Iran	104.6	104.2	105.0	105.3	104.2	105.2	628.5	Q
2	Zhang Changhong	China	103.4	103.3	104.1	104.9	103.4	105.3	624.4	Q
3	Shahu Tushar Mane	India	104.8	101.8	104.2	104.0	103.8	105.1	623.7	Q
4	Alex Hoberg	Australia	101.7	104.8	104.5	105.1	103.0	104.3	623.4	Q
5	Grigorii Shamakov	Russia	102.5	104.4	103.4	105.6	103.5	103.3	622.7	Q
6	Aleksa Mitrović	Serbia	102.6	103.4	102.3	103.6	104.5	104.0	620.4	Q
7	Maximilian Ulbrich	Germany	103.5	103.0	102.8	103.8	103.5	103.8	620.4	Q
8	Stefan Wadlegger	Austria	101.4	104.2	103.5	103.9	103.7	103.5	620.2	Q
9	Zalán Pekler	Hungary	103.6	104.0	102.8	101.4	104.1	104.1	620.0	
10	Arnab Sharar	Bangladesh	103.0	102.7	102.6	102.1	102.7	105.0	618.1	
11	Miljan Dević	Montenegro	101.9	102.8	104.3	102.9	101.8	103.3	617.0	
12	Facundo Firmapaz	Argentina	102.0	102.3	102.3	102.5	104.4	103.4	616.9	
13	Hayk Babayan	Armenia	101.8	100.9	103.5	105.2	102.4	103.1	616.9	
14	Muhammad Naufal Mahardika	Indonesia	102.3	104.3	103.2	102.7	102.5	101.2	616.2	
15	Edson Ramírez	Mexico	102.9	102.7	102.2	101.2	103.3	103.0	615.3	
16	Plamen Emilov	Bulgaria	103.0	101.3	101.7	101.6	104.0	100.8	612.4	
17	Chanidu Senanayake Mudiyanselage	Sri Lanka	99.1	102.4	100.9	101.9	103.9	102.4	610.6	
18	Amar Dizdarević	Bosnia and Herzegovina	101.5	103.3	100.5	100.5	102.6	100.2	608.6	
19	Carlos Arze	Peru	99.0	100.8	97.4	101.0	102.0	99.2	599.4	
20	Adriaan de Beer	South Africa	99.8	97.9	97.6	96.0	95.4	96.7	583.4	

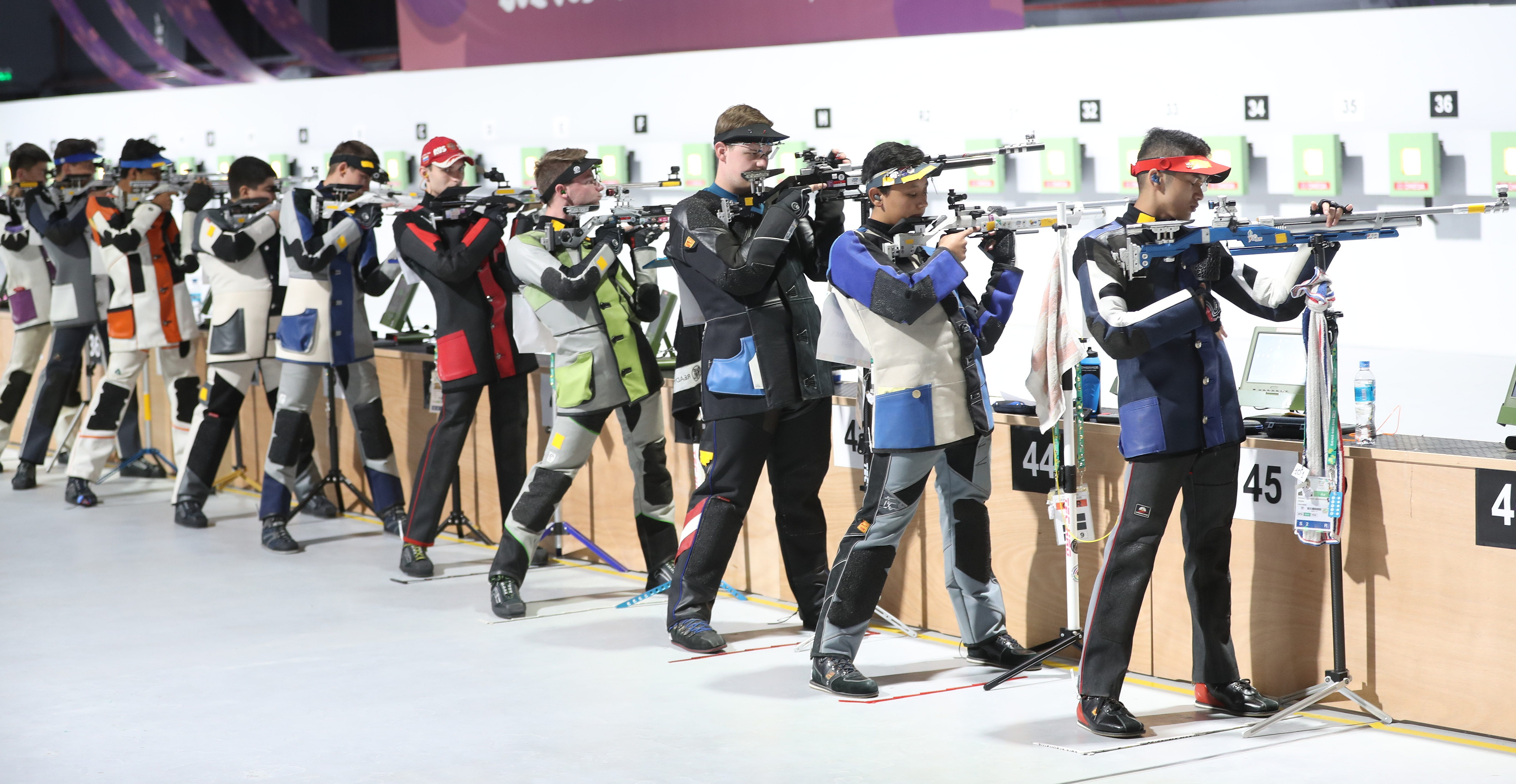

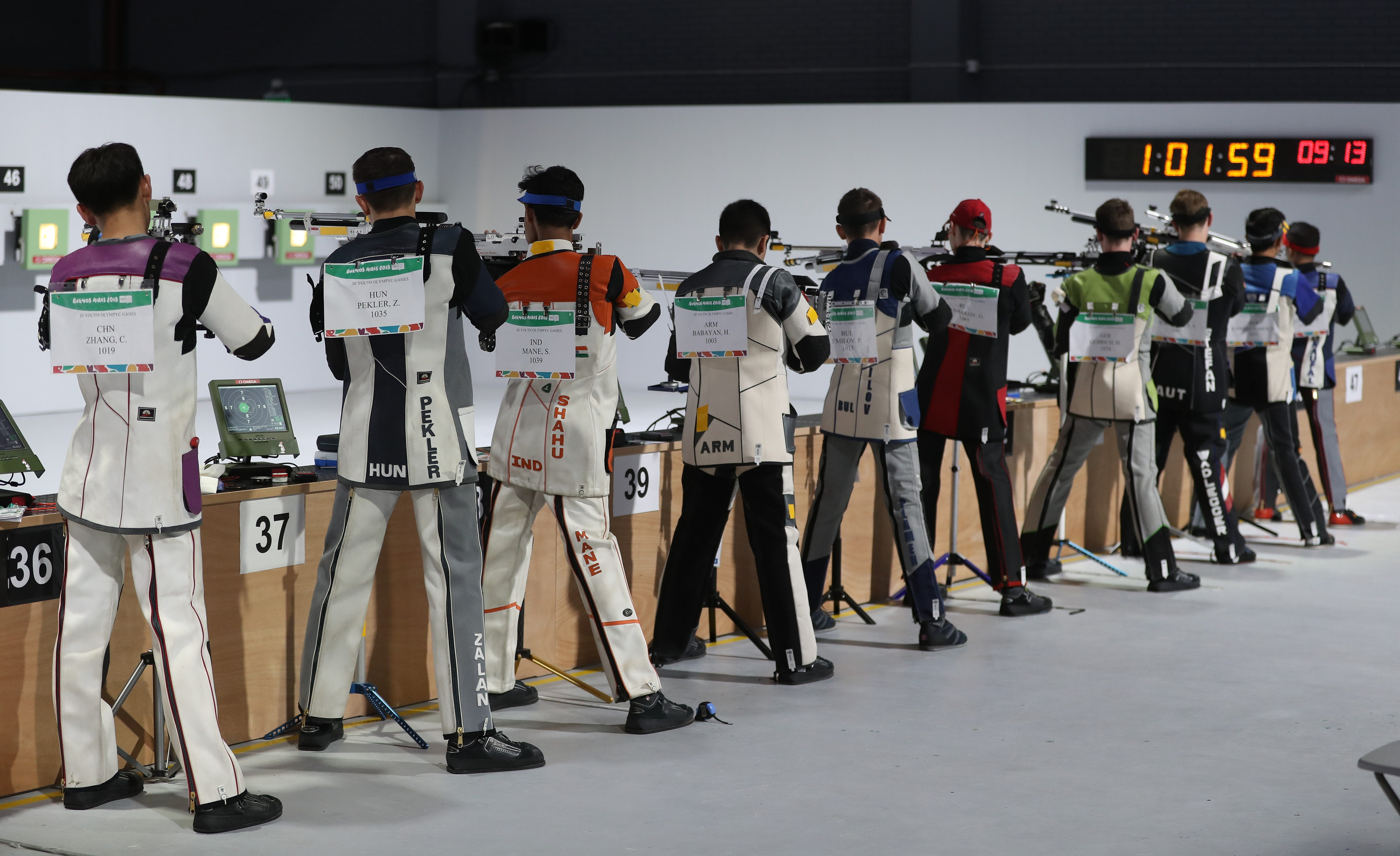

=== Final ===
Rank	Name	Nation	1	2	3	4	5	6	7	8	9	Points	Notes
1st place, gold medalist(s)	Grigorii Shamakov	Russia	51.4	52.3	20.6	21.0	21.3	20.6	20.1	20.8	21.1	249.2	
2nd place, silver medalist(s)	Shahu Tushar Mane	India	51.1	51.8	21.2	20.7	20.4	20.8	21.2	20.8	19.5	247.5	
3rd place, bronze medalist(s)	Aleksa Mitrović	Serbia	52.4	51.7	19.9	20.9	20.6	20.3	20.9	21.2		227.9	
4	Zhang Changhong	China	51.9	50.1	20.0	20.6	21.1	21.2	20.7			205.6	
5	Alex Hoberg	Australia	51.9	52.1	20.3	19.6	19.7	20.3				183.9	
6	Maximilian Ulbrich	Germany	49.2	51.4	20.8	20.6	20.9					162.9	
7	Stefan Wadlegger	Austria	50.4	49.8	20.6	20.5						141.3	
8	Amirsiyavash Zolfagharian	Iran	47.1	51.8	21.0							119.9	

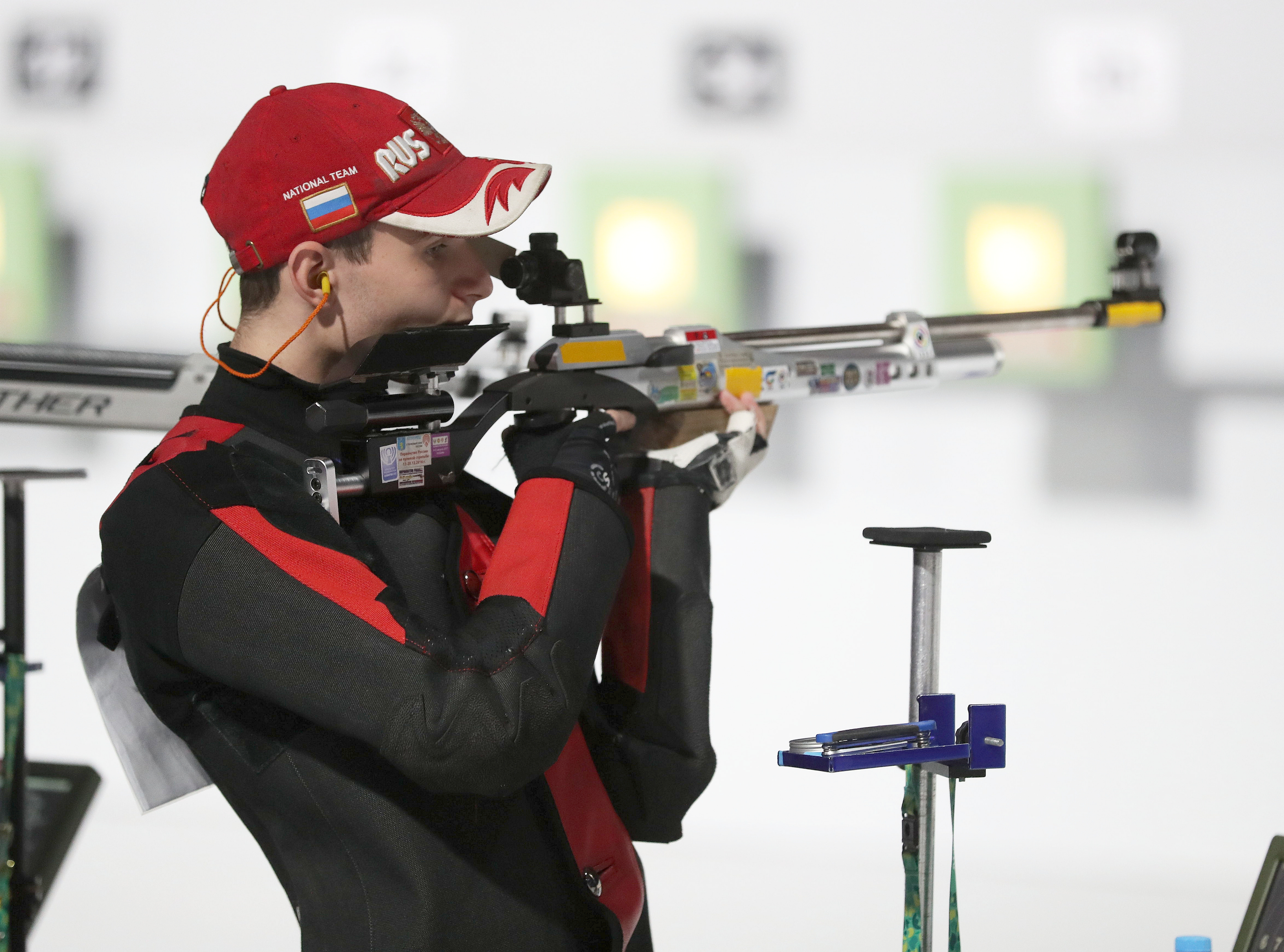
Grigorii Shamakov, gold medal

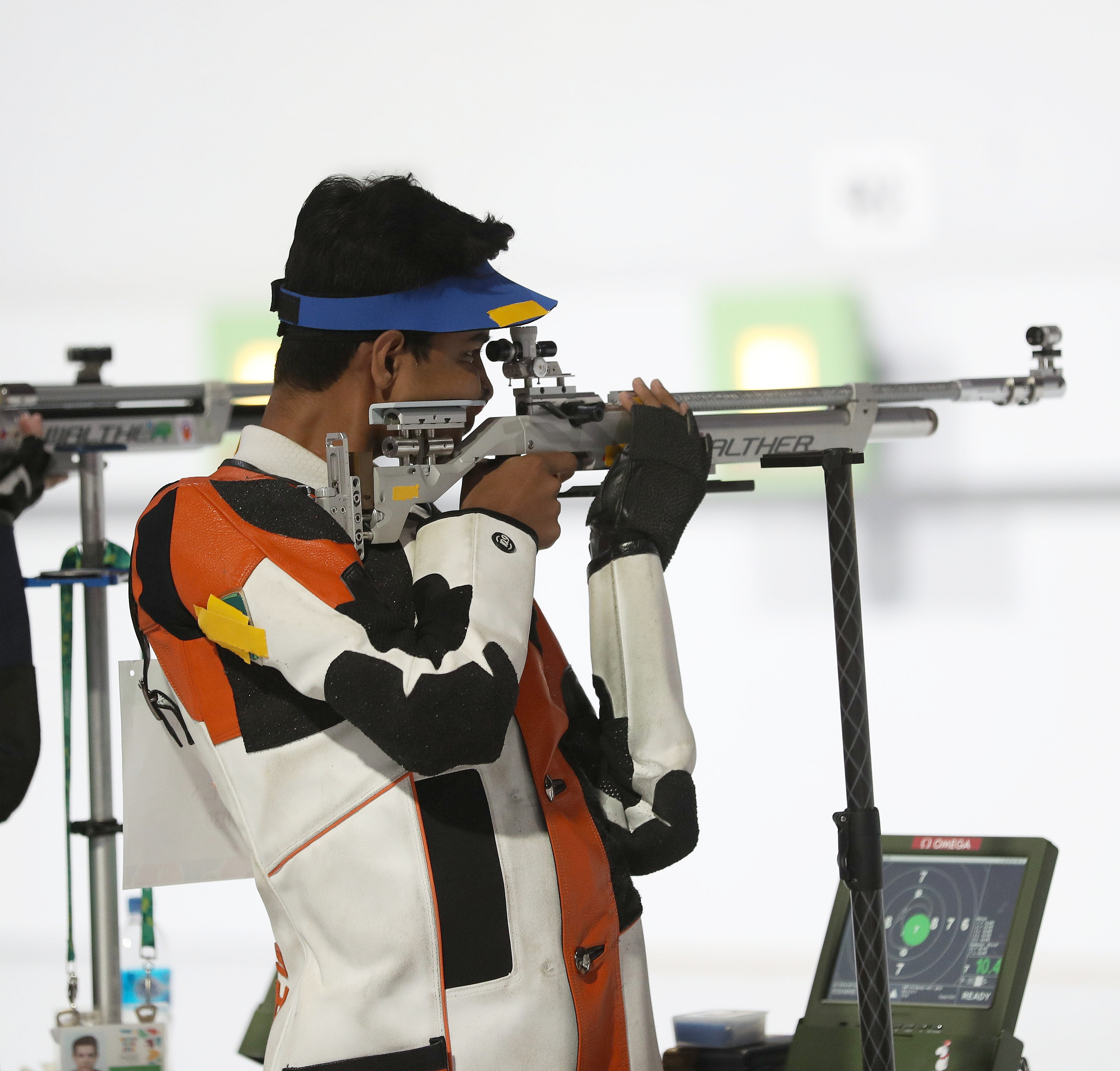
Shahu Tushar Mane, silver medal

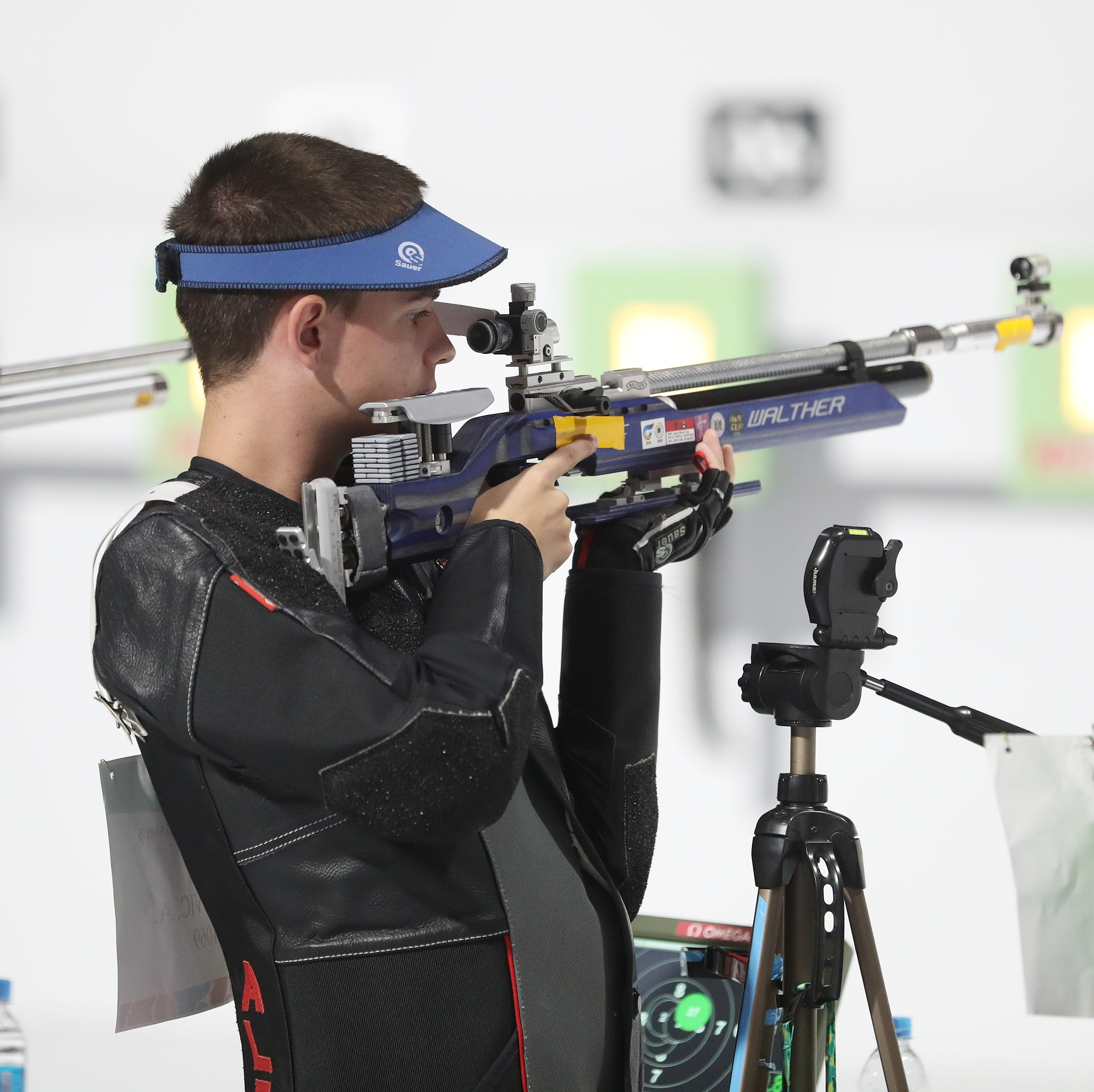
Aleksa Mitrović, bronze medal

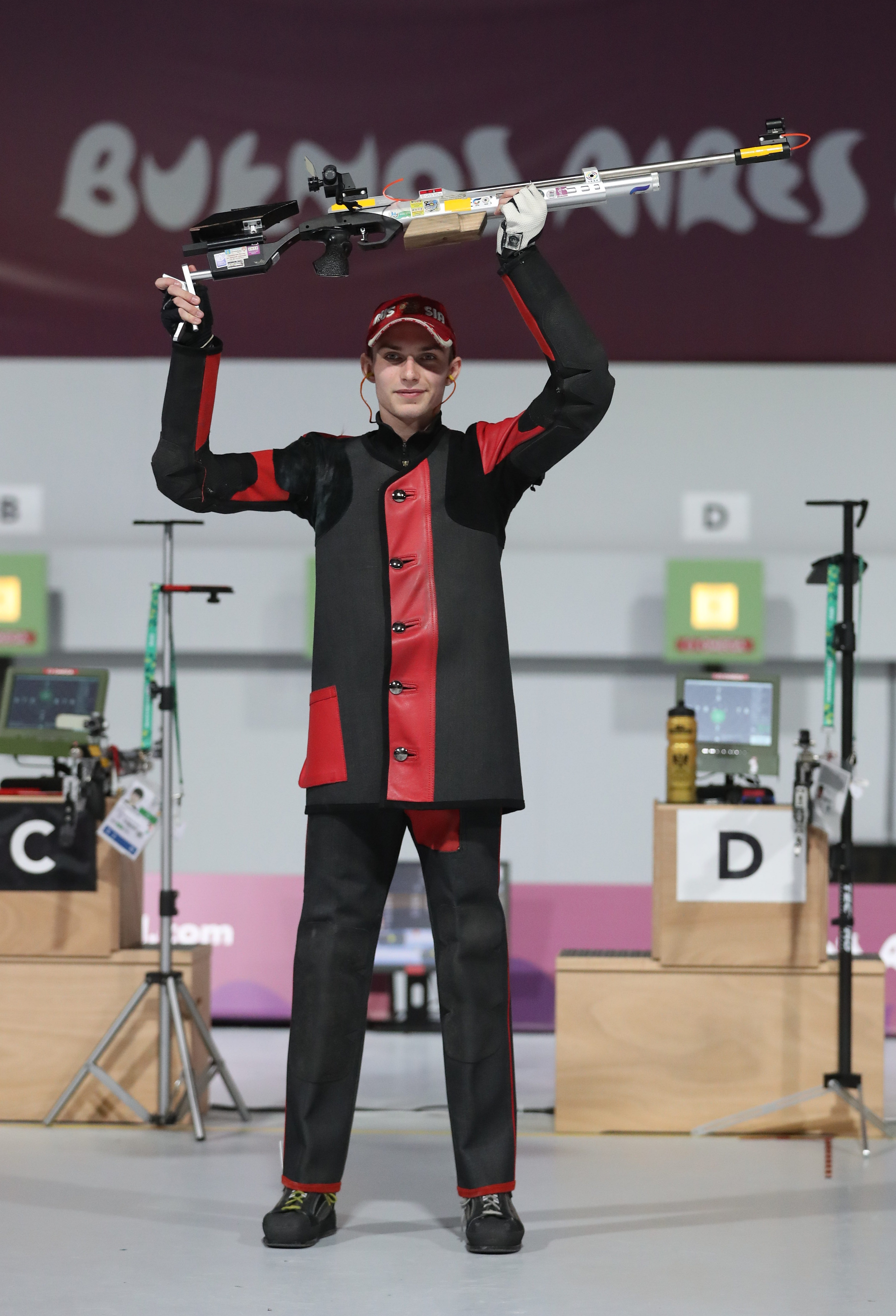
Grigorii Shamakov celebrates his victory

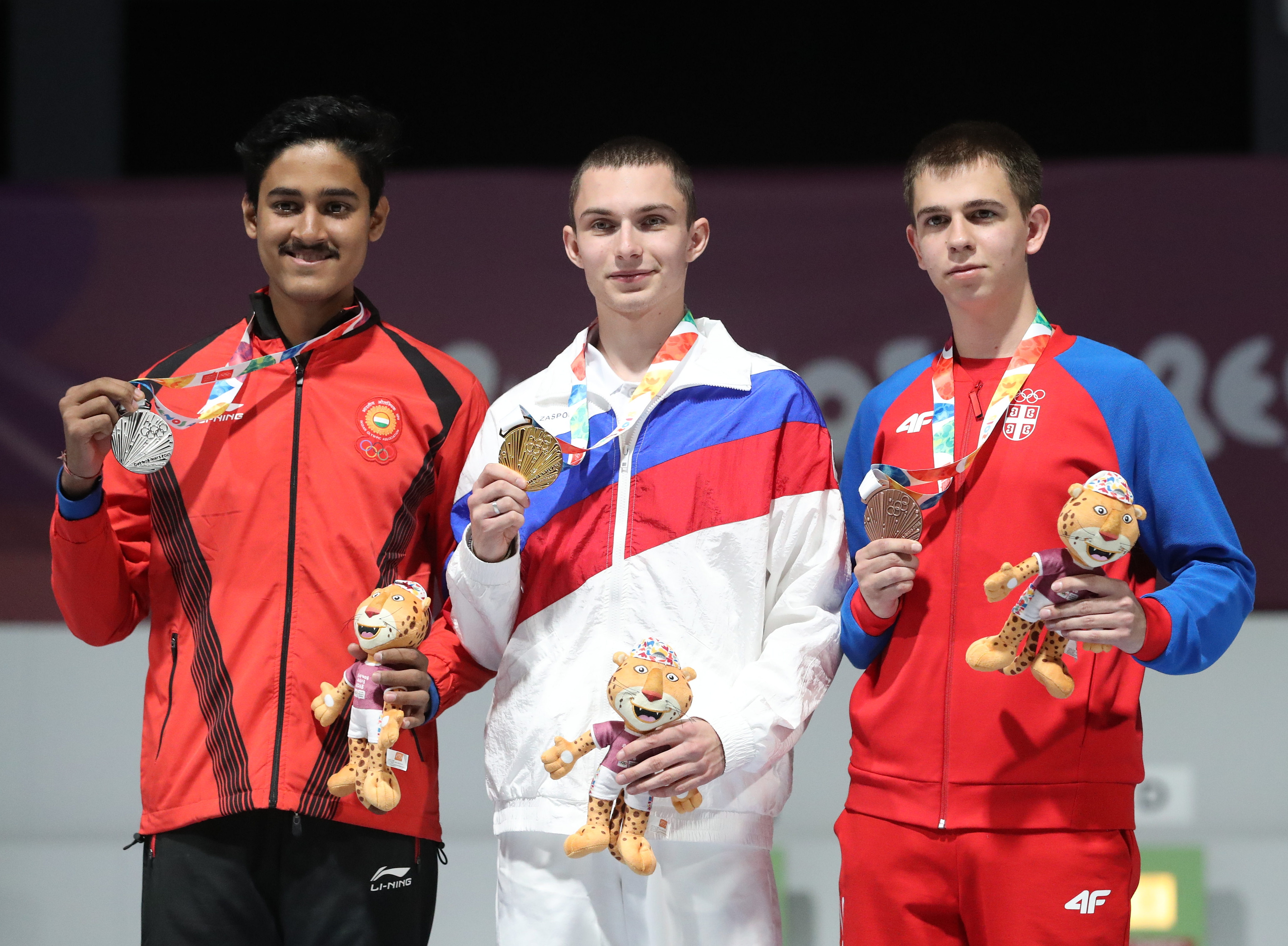
Victory ceremony
