= Yang Qian =

Yang Qian may refer to:

- Yang Qian (table tennis) (born 1996), Paralympic games table tennis player
- Yang Qian (sport shooter) (born 2000), Chinese Olympic gold medalist
