= Chloe Tipple =

New Zealand sport shooter

Personal information
- Born: 5 June 1991 (age 35) Christchurch, New Zealand
- Height: 178 cm (5 ft 10 in)

Sport
- Country: New Zealand
- Sport: Sport shooter
- Rank: 11
- Coached by: George Achilleos

Achievements and titles
- Highest world ranking: 9
Medal record
Women's shooting
Representing New Zealand
Commonwealth Championships
Silver medal – second place	2017 Brisbane	Skeet
Oceania Championships
Gold medal – first place	2015 Sydney	Skeet
Bronze medal – third place	2017 Brisbane	Skeet
World Cup
Bronze medal – third place	2017 India	Skeet

Chloe Tipple (born 5 June 1991) is a New Zealand sports shooter.

After winning the 2015 Oceania Championships, she represented New Zealand at the 2016 Summer Olympics in the Women's skeet competition, finishing 13th. She also represented New Zealand at the 2020 and 2024 Olympics.

Her father is David Tipple, the owner of the Christchurch firearms chain Gun City. David Tipple claims to own the world's biggest gun store.
