= Alex Hoberg =

Australian sport shooter (born 2001)

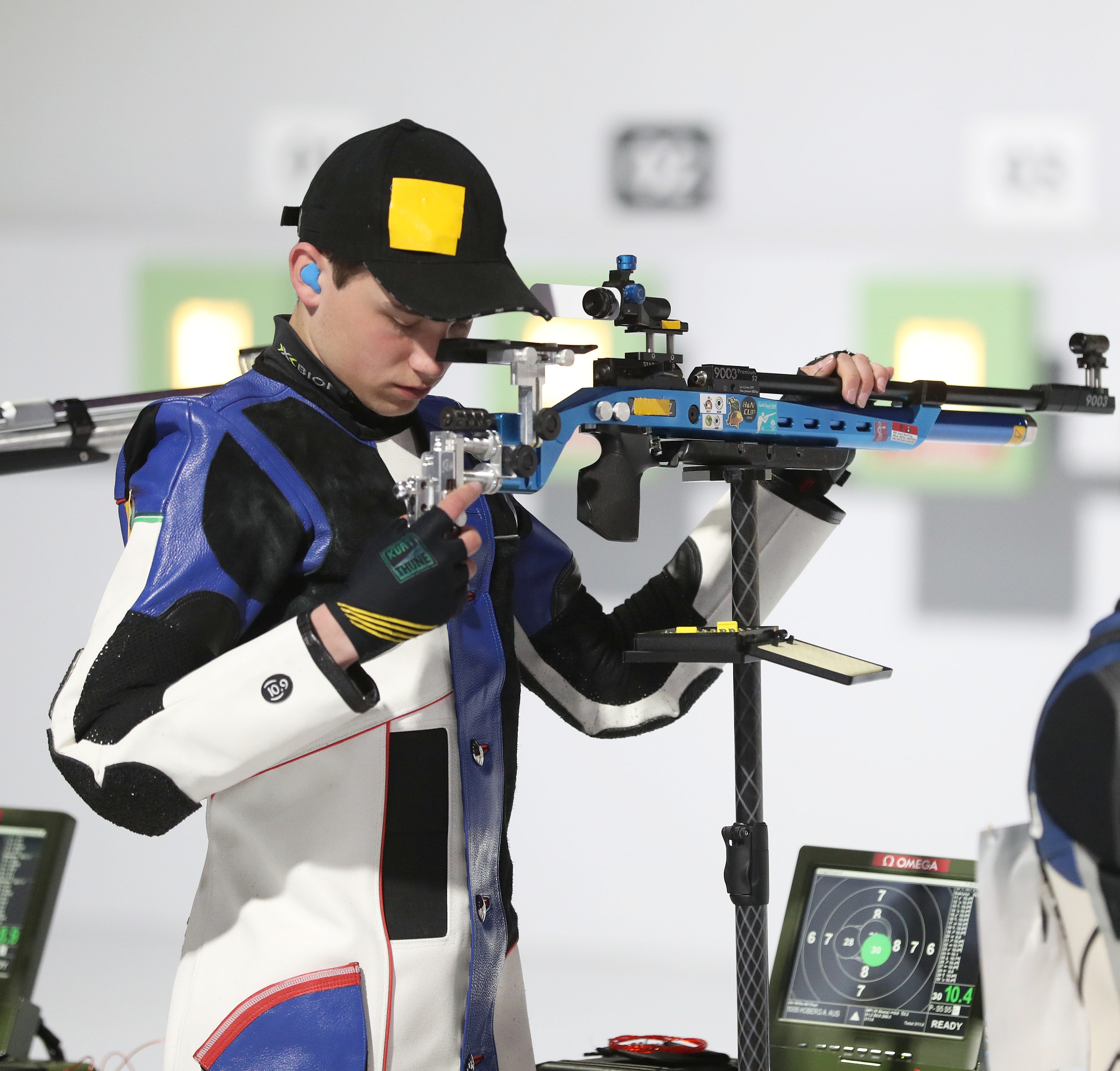
- Alex Hoberg at the 2018 Summer Youth Olympics

Personal information
- Nationality: Australian
- Born: 27 November 2001 (age 24) Adelaide, South Australia
- Height: 1.8 m (5 ft 11 in)
- Weight: 70 kg (154 lb)

Sport
- Country: Australia
- Sport: Shooting
- Event: Rifle
- Coached by: William Godward
Medal record
Men's sport shooting
Representing Australia
Commonwealth Shooting Championships
Gold medal – first place	2017 Brisbane	10 m air rifle
Oceania Shooting Championships
Gold medal – first place	2019 Sydney	10 m air rifle
Gold medal – first place	2019 Sydney	10 m air rifle team
Gold medal – first place	2019 Sydney	50 m rifle 3 positions team
Silver medal – second place	2019 Sydney	50 m rifle prone team
Silver medal – second place	2019 Sydney	50 m rifle 3 positions
Bronze medal – third place	2019 Sydney	50 m rifle prone

Alex Hoberg (born 27 November 2001) is an Australian sport shooter. In 2017, he won the gold medal in the men's 10 meter air rifle event at the 2017 Commonwealth Shooting Championships held in Brisbane, Australia.

In 2018, he represented Australia at the 2018 Commonwealth Games held in Gold Coast, Australia and he finished in 4th place in the men's 10 metre air rifle event. In the same year, he also represented Australia at the 2018 Summer Youth Olympics held in Buenos Aires, Argentina. In 2019, he won three gold medals, two silver medals and one bronze medal at the 2019 Oceania Shooting Championships held in Sydney, Australia.

Hoberg represented Australia at the 2020 Summer Olympics in Tokyo, Japan. He competed in the men's 10 metre air rifle and mixed 10 metre air rifle team events. He did not score sufficient points in either event to advance past qualification. Detailed results can be found in Australia at the 2020 Summer Olympics.
