= Shooting at the 2020 Summer Olympics – Mixed 10 metre air rifle team =

Olympic shooting event

Mixed 10 metre air rifle team at the Games of the XXXII Olympiad
- Olympic shooting pictogram
- Venue: Asaka Shooting Range
- Date: 27 July 2021
- Competitors: 58 from 20 nations
- Teams: 29

Medalists
1st place, gold medalist(s)		Yang Qian; Yang Haoran	China
2nd place, silver medalist(s)		Mary Tucker; Lucas Kozeniesky	United States
3rd place, bronze medalist(s)		Yulia Karimova; Sergey Kamenskiy	ROC

The Mixed 10 meter air rifle team event at the 2020 Summer Olympics took place on 27 July 2021 at the Asaka Shooting Range.

== Schedule ==
All times are Japan Standard Time (UTC+9)

Date	Time	Round
Tuesday, 27 July 2021	13:15; 14:00	Qualification
Tuesday, 27 July 2021	15:15	Bronze medal match
Tuesday, 27 July 2021	15:52	Gold medal match

== Results ==
=== Qualification Stage 1 ===
Rank	Athlete	Country	Series			Total	Notes
Rank	Athlete	Country	1	2	3	Total	Notes
1	Yang Qian	China 1	105.3	105.6	105.3	633.2	WR, QS2
1	Yang Haoran	China 1	105.3	105.0	106.7	633.2	WR, QS2
2	Aneta Stankiewicz	Poland	106.4	105.2	104.1	630.8	QS2
2	Tomasz Bartnik	Poland	105.5	104.4	105.2	630.8	QS2
3	Kwon Eun-ji	South Korea 1	105.0	105.3	106.1	630.5	QS2
3	Nam Tae-yun	South Korea 1	104.5	104.3	105.3	630.5	QS2
4	Anastasiia Galashina	ROC 1	104.3	105.2	105.0	629.8	QS2
4	Vladimir Maslennikov	ROC 1	105.3	105.2	104.8	629.8	QS2
5	Alison Weisz	United States 2	103.6	105.1	104.2	629.7	QS2
5	William Shaner	United States 2	105.8	105.4	105.6	629.7	QS2
6	Yulia Karimova	ROC 2	104.5	104.7	105.5	628.9	QS2
6	Sergey Kamenskiy	ROC 2	104.8	104.3	105.1	628.9	QS2
7	Mary Tucker	United States 1	103.8	104.2	103.6	628.0	QS2
7	Lucas Kozeniesky	United States 1	105.8	105.7	104.9	628.0	QS2
8	Eszter Mészáros	Hungary	103.2	104.5	104.1	627.9	QS2
8	István Péni	Hungary	105.4	105.2	105.5	627.9	QS2
9	Jenny Stene	Norway 2	104.7	104.0	104.0	626.8	
9	Jon-Hermann Hegg	Norway 2	105.1	104.9	104.1	626.8	
10	Jeanette Hegg Duestad	Norway 1	104.4	106.3	105.6	626.8	
10	Henrik Larsen	Norway 1	104.7	103.6	102.2	626.8	
11	Zhang Yu	China 2	103.5	105.0	104.7	626.7	
11	Sheng Lihao	China 2	103.6	104.7	105.2	626.7	
12	Elavenil Valarivan	India 1	105.0	104.0	104.2	626.5	
12	Divyansh Singh Panwar	India 1	103.6	104.1	105.6	626.5	
13	Haruka Nakaguchi	Japan 1	103.3	104.1	104.0	625.6	
13	Naoya Okada	Japan 1	104.2	105.2	104.8	625.6	
14	Lin Ying-shin	Chinese Taipei	104.6	104.7	104.2	625.4	
14	Lu Shao-chuan	Chinese Taipei	102.5	104.9	104.5	625.4	
15	Najmeh Khedmati	Iran	104.0	103.9	105.0	624.9	
15	Mahyar Sedaghat	Iran	103.4	104.6	104.0	624.9	
16	Andrea Arsović	Serbia 1	103.8	104.9	104.9	624.5	
16	Milutin Stefanović	Serbia 1	106.0	102.5	102.4	624.5	
17	Snježana Pejčić	Croatia	103.5	102.6	103.5	624.2	
17	Petar Gorša	Croatia	104.4	104.4	105.8	624.2	
18	Anjum Moudgil	India 2	103.0	105.0	104.4	623.8	
18	Deepak Kumar	India 2	103.4	105.3	102.7	623.8	
19	Elise Collier	Australia 2	103.9	105.2	104.2	623.6	
19	Alex Hoberg	Australia 2	103.6	103.7	103.0	623.6	
20	Park Hee-moon	South Korea 2	103.5	103.5	103.9	623.3	
20	Kim Sang-do	South Korea 2	102.9	105.5	104.0	623.3	
21	Anna Nielsen	Denmark	102.7	105.0	103.7	623.1	
21	Steffen Olsen	Denmark	103.1	104.6	104.0	623.1	
22	Katarina Kowplos	Australia 1	104.7	103.4	102.7	623.1	
22	Dane Sampson	Australia 1	104.8	103.8	103.7	623.1	
23	Maria Martynova	Belarus	103.4	104.1	104.0	622.6	
23	Yury Shcherbatsevich	Belarus	103.3	104.0	103.8	622.6	
24	Sofia Ceccarello	Italy	103.8	105.0	103.7	622.1	
24	Marco Suppini	Italy	104.2	102.0	103.4	622.1	
25	Nikola Šarounová	Czech Republic	101.9	102.9	103.7	620.6	
25	David Hrčkulák	Czech Republic	103.2	105.2	103.7	620.6	
26	Shiori Hirata	Japan 2	104.8	103.4	103.9	620.3	
26	Takayuki Matsumoto	Japan 2	102.4	101.4	104.4	620.3	
27	Fernanda Russo	Argentina	105.6	103.6	101.0	618.2	
27	Alexis Eberhardt	Argentina	102.1	102.4	103.5	618.2	
28	Alzahraa Shaban	Egypt	102.4	103.5	103.3	617.5	
28	Osama El-Saeid	Egypt	102.4	103.1	102.8	617.5	
29	Sanja Vukašinović	Serbia 2	103.3	101.4	98.7	612.4	
29	Milenko Sebić	Serbia 2	102.7	103.4	102.9	612.4	

=== Qualification Stage 2 ===
Rank	Athlete	Country	Series		Total	Notes
Rank	Athlete	Country	1	2	Total	Notes
1	Yang Qian	China 1	103.3	104.7	419.7	QG
1	Yang Haoran	China 1	106.2	105.5	419.7	QG
2	Mary Tucker	United States 1	104.9	104.4	418.0	QG
2	Lucas Kozeniesky	United States 1	103.2	105.5	418.0	QG
3	Kwon Eun-ji	South Korea 1	104.9	104.1	417.5	QB
3	Nam Tae-yun	South Korea 1	104.0	104.5	417.5	QB
4	Yulia Karimova	ROC 2	104.2	103.5	417.1	QB
4	Sergey Kamenskiy	ROC 2	104.5	104.9	417.1	QB
5	Anastasiia Galashina	ROC 1	104.2	103.3	417.0	
5	Vladimir Maslennikov	ROC 1	105.7	103.8	417.0	
6	Alison Weisz	United States 2	103.7	102.8	416.8	
6	William Shaner	United States 2	104.7	105.6	416.8	
7	Eszter Mészáros	Hungary	101.5	105.1	414.6	
7	István Péni	Hungary	104.6	103.4	414.6	
8	Aneta Stankiewicz	Poland	103.3	104.5	414.0	
8	Tomasz Bartnik	Poland	103.5	102.7	414.0	

=== Final ===
Rank	Team	Nation	Total
Gold medal match
1st place, gold medalist(s)	Yang Qian; Yang Haoran	China 1	17
2nd place, silver medalist(s)	Mary Tucker; Lucas Kozeniesky	United States 1	13
Bronze medal match
3rd place, bronze medalist(s)	Yulia Karimova; Sergey Kamenskiy	ROC 2	17
4	Kwon Eun-ji; Nam Tae-yun	South Korea 1	9
