= Lisa-Anne Smith =

Australian sport shooter

Personal information
- Nationality: Australian
- Born: 3 October 1978 (age 47)

Sport
- Sport: Sport shooting
- Events: Women's trap, women's double trap

Achievements and titles
- Olympic finals: 2000 Summer Olympics: =10th, women's trap
- World finals: 6th, women's trap, 1999 ISSF World Championships
- Regional finals: Silver, women's trap, 2019 Oceania Championships

Lisa-Anne Smith (born 3 October 1978) is an Australian sport shooter who has competed in trap and double trap shooting. She represented Australia in the women's trap at the 2000 Summer Olympics, scoring 62 targets and finishing tied for tenth place.

== Career ==
At the 1996 Tasmanian Trap Nationals, Smith won the women's division of the 43rd Grand Australasian Handicap with a score of 50 out of 50. She also won bronze medals in the Ladies National Double Barrel Championship and Ladies National Double Rise Championship.

Smith finished sixth in women's double trap at the 1997 ISSF World Cup in Brisbane. In 1998, she won silver in women's trap at the ISSF World Cup in Lonato, Italy, and later placed seventh at the World Cup Final in Montecatini, Italy.

At the 1999 ISSF World Shooting Championships in Tampere, Finland, Smith placed sixth in women's trap. She also finished 11th at the 1999 ISSF World Cup in Kumamoto, Japan.

In 2000, Smith placed fourth at the Sydney ISSF World Cup and sixth at the Lonato World Cup.

At the 2019 Oceania Shooting Championships in Sydney, Smith shared the lead in women's-trap qualification with New Zealand's Natalie Rooney after three rounds, with 66 targets. She ultimately won silver, behind Rooney.
