= Shooting at the 2010 Commonwealth Games – Men's 25 metre rapid fire pistol pairs =

The Men's 25 metre rapid fire pistol pairs event at the 2010 Commonwealth Games took place on 7 October 2010, at the CRPF Campus.

== Results ==
Rank	Name	Country	Stage 1	Stage 2	Ind. Total	Total
1st place, gold medalist(s)	Vijay Kumar	India	294	293	587^{24}	1162^{48} (GR)
1st place, gold medalist(s)	Gurpreet Singh	India	282	293	575^{23}	1162^{48} (GR)
2nd place, silver medalist(s)	Hasli Amir Hasan	Malaysia	291	285	576^{15}	1144^{26}
2nd place, silver medalist(s)	Hafiz Adzha	Malaysia	282	293	575^{23}	1144^{26}
3rd place, bronze medalist(s)	Bruce Quick	Australia	278	285	563^{16}	1125^{27}
3rd place, bronze medalist(s)	David Chapman	Australia	278	284	562^{11}	1125^{27}
4	Metodi Igorov	Canada	282	275	557^{5}	1093^{12}
4	Alan Markewicz	Canada	267	269	536^{7}	1093^{12}
5	Alan Green	Wales	269	262	531^{6}	1042^{11}
5	Steve Pengelly	Wales	264	247	511^{5}	1042^{11}
