= National Rifle Association of Australia =

Sports governing body

- Sport: Shooting Sports
- Category: Fullbore target rifle
- Jurisdiction: Australia
- Abbreviation: NRAA, NRA
- Founded: 1888
- Affiliation: Shooting Australia
- Headquarters: Belmont
- President: Brigadier Bruce Scott
- Chairperson: Tina Thornhill
- Replaced: General Council of the Rifle Associations of Australasia

Official website
- nraa.com.au
- (Australia)

The National Rifle Association of Australia (NRAA) is the national governing body for Fullbore rifle shooting in Australia.

The NRAA is the representative member for Australia to the International Confederation of Fullbore Rifle Associations (ICFRA) and participates in ICFRA World Championships and the Commonwealth Games.

== History ==
The NRAA was established in 1888 as the General Council of the Rifle Associations of Australasia, following a meeting of representatives from colonial rifle associations the previous year. Target shooting had been developing as a sport across Australia. The Northern Miner reported the first meeting of the North Queensland Rifle Association in the same year. The developing regional associations sought to put together an Australian team to compete in the Imperial Meeting at Wimbledon in the UK. Adelaide, South Australia, New South Wales, Victoria and Tasmania were initially represented.

The NRAA first hosted the ICFRA World Long-Range Championships (the "Palma Match") in 1988 near Sydney. The Australian team won, beating runners-up Great Britain by 21 points. The match returned to Australia in 2011, held on the Belmont Ranges near Brisbane. Great Britain won the 2011 Palma Match, leading runners up South Africa by 35 points. Australia placed fourth after the USA.

== See also ==
- Shooting Australia
