= Rory Warlow =

British sport shooter (born 1990)

Personal information
- Nationality: British
- Born: 13 April 1990 (age 36) Plymouth

Sport
- Country: United Kingdom
- Sport: Shooting
- Event: Skeet
Medal record
Men's shooting
Representing England
Commonwealth Games
Bronze medal – third place	Glasgow 2014	Skeet individual

Rory Warlow (13 April 1990) is an English sport shooter born in Plymouth. At the 2012 Summer Olympics he competed in the Men's skeet, finishing in 16th place.

At the 2014 Commonwealth Games, he won the bronze medal in the men's skeet, beating Cyprus's Andreas Chasikos to claim the medal.
