= Shooting at the 2019 Island Games =

- Dates: 7–12 July

Shooting, for the 2019 Island Games, took place at 4 venues in Gibraltar in July 2019.

- Clay Shooting Range
- Pistol Shooting Range
- Rifle Shooting Range
- Willis's Magazine

== Medal table ==
* Host nation (Gibraltar)

Rank	Nation	Gold	Silver	Bronze	Total
1	Jersey	12	5	6	23
2	Guernsey	5	4	4	13
2	Isle of Wight	5	4	4	13
4	Saaremaa	4	3	2	9
5	Gibraltar*	3	9	6	18
6	Gotland	3	7	6	16
7	Faroe Islands	3	1	0	4
8	Menorca	2	1	1	4
9	Isle of Man	1	0	2	3
10	Orkney	1	0	1	2
11	Hitra Municipality	0	2	1	3
12	Åland	0	1	4	5
13	Cayman Islands	0	1	1	2
14	Sark	0	1	0	1
15	Bermuda	0	0	1	1
Totals (15 entries)		39	39	39	117

== Results ==
=== ISSF (International Shooting Sport Federation) ===
==== Pistol ====
Event	Gold		Silver		Bronze	
Men's 10 m air pistol	Nemo Tabur; Saaremaa	229.9	Perron Phipps; Isle of Wight	226	Daniel Louis Payas; Gibraltar	205.9
Women's 10 m air pistol	Nicola Holmes; Jersey	1095	Eva Widing; Gotland	1057	Imogen Moss; Isle of Wight	890.1
Men's 25 m standard pistol	Jonathan David Patron; Gibraltar	548	Peter Nordgren; Gotland	541	Roland Maimre; Saaremaa	537
Women's 25 m standard pistol	Nikki Trebert; Guernsey	526	Eva Widing; Gotland	519	Imogen Moss; Isle of Wight	501
Men's 25 m centrefire	Nemo Tabur; Saaremaa	573	Roland Maimre; Saaremaa	551	Fredrik Blomqvist; Åland Islands	530
Women's 25 m sport pistol	Nikki Trebert; Guernsey	550	Nicola Holmes; Jersey	540	Eva Widing; Gotland	532
Men's 50 m free pistol	Nemo Tabur; Saaremaa	491	Pedro Salord; Menorca	481	Pontus Nordgren; Gotland	474
Men's 10 m air pistol team	Isle of Wight; Perron Phipps; Matthew Reed	1109	Saaremaa; Roland Maimre; Nemo Tabur	1091	Isle of Man; Joshua Holden; Nathan Holden	1090
Women's 10 m air pistol team	Jersey; Nicola Holmes; Mary Norman	1058	Isle of Wight; Imogen Moss; Shelley Moss	1054	Gibraltar; Sasha Alexander; Bettina Manner	1052
Men's 25 m standard pistol team	Gotland; Peter Nordgren; Pontus Nordgren	1087	Saaremaa; Roland Maimre; Nemo Tabur	1075	Gibraltar; Jonathan David Patron; Daniel Louis Payas	1038
Women's 25 m standard pistol team	Isle of Wight; Imogen Moss; Shelley Moss	1017	Guernsey; Rebecca Margetts; Nikki Trebert	962	Jersey; Amy Hall; Mary Norman	896
Men's 25 m centrefire team	Saaremaa; Roland Maimre; Nemo Tabur	1129	Gotland; Thomas Larsson; Olof Widing	1055	Åland Islands; Fredrik Blomqvist; Mikael Johansson	1045
Women's 25 m sport pistol team	Guernsey; Rebecca Margetts; Nikki Trebert	1080	Isle of Wight; Imogen Moss; Shelley Moss	1066	Jersey; Nicola Holmes; Mary Norman	1048
Men's 50 m free pistol team	Isle of Wight; Perron Phipps; Matthew Reed	945	Gibraltar; Jonathan David Patron; Daniel Louis Payas	928	Saaremaa; Roland Maimre; Nemo Tabur	928

==== Rifle ====
Event	Gold		Silver		Bronze	
Men's 10 m air rifle	Cameron Pirouet; Jersey	247.9 GR	Dailen Broton; Gibraltar	238.5	Paul Guilou; Guernsey	213.8
Women's 10 m air rifle	Frida Eriksson; Gotland	244.1	Mairead Lourdes Anne Sheriff; Gibraltar	239.2	Amanda Glansholm; Gotland	219.8
Men's 50 m rifle prone	Robert Spence; Orkney	615.6	Dominic Cowen; Isle of Wight	614.8	Andrew Whittall; Isle of Wight	612.6
Women's 50 m rifle prone	Jehnny Gardelin; Gotland	605.5	Mairead Lourdes Anne Sheriff; Gibraltar	603.4	Adrienne Smatt; Bermuda	603.3
50 m rifle 3 positions	Cameron Pirouet; Jersey	443.1	Frida Eriksson; Gotland	439.4	Robert Spence; Orkney	417.3
Mixed 10 m air rifle team	Jersey; Caitlin Mills; Cameron Pirouet	483.4	Gotland; Frida Eriksson; Andreas Karlsson	480.4	Gibraltar; Stephanie Piri; James Scott	413.6
10 m air rifle team	Jersey; Darren Fry; Cameron Pirouet	1217.2	Gibraltar; Stephanie Piri; Mairead Lourdes Anne Sheriff	1213.6	Gotland; Amanda Glansholm; Erica Karlsson	1210.2
50 m rifle prone team	Isle of Wight; Dominic Cowen; Andrew Whittall	1233.8 GR	Jersey; Sarah Campion; Susan De Gruchy	1221.9 GR	Gibraltar; Natalie Jade Piri; Mairead Lourdes Anne Sheriff	1217.7
50 m rifle 3 positions team	Jersey; Toby Baillon; Cameron Pirouet	2219	Gibraltar; Kristina Hewitt; Mairead Lourdes Anne Sheriff	2161	Gotland; Björn Ahlby; Lars-Olof Larsson	2159

==== Shotgun ====
Event	Gold		Silver		Bronze	
Skeet	Marius Fríðálvur Joensen; Faroe Islands	49	Fredrik Melin; Gotland	45	Marcus Påvals; Åland Islands	36
Trap	Juan Manuel Bosch; Menorca	41	Alex Johannesen; Faroe Islands	38	Kevin Cowles; Gibraltar	30
Skeet team	Faroe Islands; Tórur Fløtt; Marius Fríðálvur Joensen	173	Åland Islands; Bengt-Olof Lindgren; Marcus Påvals	161	Gotland; Carl-Göran Hederstedt; Fredrik Melin	159
Trap team	Menorca; Juan Manuel Bosch; Sebastià Moll	174	Sark; Nicholas Dewe; Stefan Roberts	171	Isle of Man; David Walton; Robert Watterson	166

=== Automatic Ball ===
Event	Gold		Silver		Bronze	
Automatic ball trap	Alex Johannesen; Faroe Islands	140 GR	Thomas Burns; Jersey	138	Juan Manuel Bosch; Menorca	137
Automatic ball trap team	Isle of Man; Mark Riley; Alan Wade	183	Guernsey; Darren Burtenshaw; Alexander Williams	182	Jersey; Mark Andrews; Gareth Joseph	182

=== NPA (Natural Point of Aim) ===
Event	Gold		Silver		Bronze	
Police pistol 1	James Straughan; Guernsey	298	Andrew Torode; Guernsey	296	Mark Dubras; Jersey	295
Service pistol B	Mark Dubras; Jersey	109	Jørgen Olsen; Hitra	103	Andrew Torode; Guernsey	102
Police pistol 1 team	Jersey; Mark Dubras; Benjamin Videgrain	579	Gibraltar; Stephen Borge; John Holmes	578	Guernsey; James Straughan; Andrew Torode	576
Service pistol B team	Guernsey; James Straughan; Andrew Torode	210	Jersey; Mark Dubras; Benjamin Videgrain	208	Hitra Municipality; Roy Aune; Jørgen Olsen	178

=== IPSC (International Practical Shooting Confederation) ===
Event	Gold		Silver		Bronze	
Standard division	Richard Clifton; Isle of Wight	685.451	Ales Cevela; Cayman Islands	634.9683	James Daly; Jersey	612.7204
Open division	Stephen Borge; Gibraltar	709.6634	Mario Apap; Gibraltar	605.0448	Ales Cevela; Cayman Islands	575.0452
Standard division team	Jersey; Tobias Cabaret; James Daly	1192.0483	Gibraltar; John Holmes; Edward Yome	1116.9122	Isle of Wight; Richard Clifton; Ian Grimes	1059.3146
Open division team	Gibraltar; Mario Apap; Stephen Borge	1314.7082	Jersey; Alain Cabaret; Michael Nolan	874.9846	Åland Islands; Victor Erikslund; Tomas Mörn	842.7699

=== WA (World Association) ===
Event	Gold		Silver		Bronze	
Revolver 1500 48 shot-max 6" barrel	Mark Dubras; Jersey	473	Andrew Torode; Guernsey	471	Benjamin Videgrain; Jersey	470
Revolver 1500 48 shot-max 6" barrel team	Jersey; Mark Dubras; Benjamin Videgrain	939	Hitra Municipality; Roy Aune; Jørgen Olsen	922	Guernsey; James Straughan; Andrew Torode	919
