= Shooting at the 2014 Commonwealth Games – Women's skeet =

Shooting – Women's Skeet at the 2014 Commonwealth Games
- Venue: Barry Buddon Shooting Centre
- Dates: 25 July 2014
- Competitors: 9 from 6 nations
- Winning score: 14

Medalists
gold medal	Laura Coles	Australia
silver medal	Elena Allen	Wales
bronze medal	Andri Eleftheriou	Cyprus

The Women's skeet event will take place at 25 July 2014 at the Barry Buddon Shooting Centre. There will be a qualification to determine the final participants.

== Results ==
=== Qualification ===
Rank	Name	1	2	3	Points	Notes
1	Laura Coles (AUS)	24	22	24	70	Q
2	Andri Eleftheriou (CYP)	24	24	21	69	Q
3	Elena Allen (WAL)	24	22	22	68	Q
4	Lauryn Mark (AUS)	25	21	22	68	Q
5	Arti Singh Rao (IND)	25	22	20	67	Q
6	Sarah Gray (ENG)	22	21	22	65	Q
7	Amber Hill (ENG)	23	22	20	65	
8	Panagiota Andreou (CYP)	22	22	21	65	
9	Sian Bruce (SCO)	22	22	19	63	

=== Semifinals ===
Rank	Name	Points	Notes
1	Laura Coles (AUS)	15	QG
2	Elena Allen (WAL)	13(2)	QG
3	Sarah Gray (ENG)	13(1)	QB
4	Andri Eleftheriou (CYP)	12(4)	QB
5	Arti Singh Rao (IND)	12(3)	
6	Lauryn Mark (AUS)	9	

QB: Qualified to Bronze

QG: Qualified to Gold

=== Bronze ===
Rank	Name	Points	Notes
3rd place, bronze medalist(s)	Andri Eleftheriou (CYP)	13	
4	Sarah Gray (ENG)	12	

=== Gold ===
Rank	Name	Points	Notes
1st place, gold medalist(s)	Laura Coles (AUS)	14	
2nd place, silver medalist(s)	Elena Allen (WAL)	13	
