= Down-the-line =

Variation of trap shooting popular in the Commonwealth nations

Down-the-line (DTL) clay pigeon shooting is a variation of trap shooting which is very popular in Australia, New Zealand, South Africa, Zimbabwe, Canada, France, the United Kingdom, and Ireland.

Its origins stem from live pigeon shooting as well as the very beginnings of the clay target sort. DTL now forms part of the family of trap disciplines and in number of competitors is undoubtedly the largest variant, especially in the Commonwealth countries where it is most popular. Competitors use a double barrelled shotgun, usually 'under-and-over' type, and are allowed to fire both barrels at a single target released on the traditional call of 'Pull!'. The maximum load permitted is 28g per cartridge, slightly larger than the Olympic disciplines which use a standard 24g load.

== Layout and rules ==
The traditional DTL shooting layout is set up with 5 stands in a crescent shape 16 yards from a traphouse, which throws a random target from an oscillating trap between 0 and 22.5 degrees to either side of a center post, set 50–55 yards from the traphouse. The clay should always be on a common trajectory for height, even though it is variable in horizontal angle. The average speed for a down the line clay target leaving the traphouse is usually 42 mph +/- 1 mph.

A normal competition would have the competitor shooting at 100 targets in total in a day. This would be built up of 25 targets at 4 different layouts (traps) with 5 targets shot on each stand rotating on a 1 > 2 >>> 5 basis, hence 100 targets total.

The scoring of points is 3 points for first barrel kill, 2 points for a second barrel kill, 0 points for a lost target. A perfect score is therefore 100 targets each 'killed' with the first barrel, total 300 points. The 100/300 is a real achievement, the 4-minute mile or the 147 break of the trap shooter.

Scores are expressed with number of kills followed by number of points e.g. 98/292 would mean 2 birds missed completely and a total of 8 points dropped due to having second barreled 2 including missing 2. Competitions are decided only by points, so this score would beat a 100/291.

The competition is shot in 'squads' of a maximum of 5 shooters occupying the 5 stands which are also called pegs. These squads are not usually teams as such, but groups of individual shooters shooting in turn i.e. Competitor 1 on peg 1 shoots 1 target; then competitor 2 on peg 2; etc. until each has shot 5 targets from each peg. They then move one peg to the right before shooting a further 5 shots in turn from that peg and so on until 5 shots have been taken from all 5 pegs, the 25 targets on that layout (aka trap).

DTL is perhaps the 'easier' single shot to make of any clay shooting discipline, but the result is an incredibly high standard of competition. Even a small club shoot will see almost perfect scores posted by the better shots, so concentration and mental strength are the real talents displayed by competitors.

== Regulation ==
Most governing bodies record their members scores from every registered competition and then grade the competitors into classes, similar to a golf handicap. These classes are AA (nominally the elite shooters), A (expert), B (intermediate) and C (novice). Prizes are awarded in each class so competitors are shooting both for the overall 'HIGH GUN' (HG) and against their peers in their respective class. Averages are reassessed periodically (every six months in the UK for example) and shooters re-classified according to form.

There are further demarcations for Juniors, Colts, Ladies, Vets (60+) and Super Vets (65+), who will also be competing for HG and class honours. There are often further classes for disabled competitors, or for competitors who use wheelchairs. For major international events or Inter-County (IC) championships, teams representing each country or county may be formed.

The sport is very inclusive – a novice shooter can find themselves on a squad alongside a World Champion, his wife, grandfather and grandson competing on equal terms. Competitors come from every walk of life and as entry to a typical club competition is on average around £30 and cartridges for an event perhaps the same again, the cost of competition is modest. It is certainly not the preserve of the wealthy.

Most shooting grounds will offer trial lessons and experience days.

Other variations are double rise DR, single barrel SB, automatic ball trap ABT, and handicap by distance HPD.

The governing bodies in the UK and Ireland are the Clay Pigeon Shooting Association (CPSA; England), Irish Clay Target Shooting Association (ICTSA), Ulster Clay Pigeon Shooting Association (UCPSA; Northern Ireland), Scottish Clay Target Association (SCTA) and Welsh Clay Target Shooting Association (WCTSA).

Governing bodies in Australia are the ACTA Queensland QCTA, New South Wales NSWCTA Victoria VCTA Tasmania TCTA South Australia SACTA Western Australia WAACTA Northern Territory NTCTA

== Events ==
In the UK, the British DTL Championships are held in July every year, namely the Home Internationals and British Open events. These are held every year on rotation between England, Ireland, Scotland, Wales and, the newest inclusion, Northern Ireland.

The Home International (HI) consists of all host countries competing with teams of 20 seniors, 5 ladies, 5 veterans, 5 super veterans and 5 juniors to become the winning nation. The main competition is between the seniors with their greatest involvement in the event, although there is great pride shown when the other teams win their specific competition. On the night after the international there is a hosted banquet in which the prizes for the day are handed out.

The British Open has an element of the previous days activities with the teams competing but greater emphasis is put on the competition of the overall British senior, ladies, veteran and junior champions.

Northern Ireland hosted their first ever DTL Home International and British Open in 2006 at Culbann C.P.C, Ballynease, County Londonderry. This event was the culmination of a lot of preparation from Culbann C.P.C, by upgrading from a 4-layout facility to an 8-layout facility. Through the upgrading of the ground, the 4 layouts originally used were deemed redundant and they have been demolished to make space for the 8 new layouts. It was a great time for Northern Ireland as not only hosting the event for the first time, they managed to walk away as the overall winners of the Home International 2006.

In 2014 the championships will be hosted by Bywell SG in Northumberland, England.

There are several 'major' competitions every year in the UK, each attracting around 600 or more competitors. Competition is usually over two days, though some are one day, and sponsor or preliminary/warm up shoots take place on the days leading up to the main event. Amongst these are the Krieghoff at Mid Wales SG, Perazzi at Bywell SG and the Dougall Memorial (shot since 1903), the English Open and the British Open which move from ground to ground.

There are also the Euros held each year, that will attract teams and competitors from other nations such as France, Sweden, Germany amongst many others.

Every two years, the DTL World Championships are held, alternating between the Northern and Southern Hemispheres. In 2014 New Zealand host the 11th Worlds, following Wales in 2012, South Africa in 2010, Ireland in 2008, Australia in 2006. It returns to Ireland in 2016.

This is held over three days with 100 targets shot on each of the first two days, then a further 50 on the morning of day three. Scores are collated and the top 10% of competitors in each class (AA, A, B and C) proceed to shoot a further 50 targets (total 300) and the scores are added to the previous 250 to decide the places. Shoot offs are held to determine any significant places where tied.

== See also ==
- List of British sport shooters
