= Blake Blackburn =

Australian sports shooter

Personal information
- Born: 3 August 1992 (age 33)

Sport
- Sport: Sports shooting

Blake Blackburn (born 3 August 1992) is an Australian sports shooter. He competed in the men's 10 metre air pistol event at the 2016 Summer Olympics.
