= Jennifer Hens =

Australian sports shooter

Personal information
- Born: 1 August 1986 (age 39) Lithgow, New South Wales, Australia

Sport
- Sport: Sports shooting

Jennifer Hens (born 1 August 1986) is an Australian sports shooter. She competed in the women's 10 metre air rifle event at the 2016 Summer Olympics.
