= Laura Coles =

Australian sport shooter (born 1987)

Personal information
- Nationality: Australia
- Born: 22 April 1987 (age 39) Perth, Australia
- Height: 157 cm (5 ft 2 in)

Sport
- Country: Australia
- Sport: Sport shooter
- Event: Skeet shooting
Medal record
Representing Australia
Women's shooting
Commonwealth Games
Gold medal – first place	2014 Glasgow	Women's skeet
Oceania Championships
Gold medal – first place	2017 Gold Coast	Women's skeet
Gold medal – first place	2013 Sydney	Women's skeet
Silver medal – second place	2019 Sydney	Women's skeet
Silver medal – second place	2015 Sydney	Women's skeet
Silver medal – second place	2011 Sydney	Women's skeet
- Updated on 3 April 2021

Laura Coles (born 22 April 1987) is an Australian sport shooter. She competed in the women's skeet event at the 2014 Commonwealth Games where she won a gold medal.She also competed at the 2018 Commonwealth Games held in the Gold Coast, Australia, where she placed 9th.

Laura represented Australia at the postponed 2020 Tokyo Olympics in Women's Skeet Shooting. She did not score sufficient points to advance past qualification.

She is married to Nick Melanko and manages a Perth-based clay target shooting experience business called Hot Shots Shooting.
