= Hayley Chapman =

Australian sport shooter

Personal information
- Nickname: Halez
- Nationality: Australian
- Born: 19 January 1992 (age 34) Balaklava, South Australia
- Height: 168 cm (5 ft 6 in) (2012)
- Weight: 54 kg (119 lb) (2012)

Sport
- Country: Australia
- Sport: Sport shooting
- Club: Balaklava Sports Shooting Club

Hayley Chapman (born 19 January 1992) is an Australian sport shooter who represented Australia at the 2012 Summer Olympics in shooting in the 25m pistol event where she placed 34th out of 39.

== Personal ==
Chapman was born on 19 January 1992 in Balaklava, South Australia. She grew up on a farm in Hoyleton, South Australia and attended Horizon Christian School for primary and secondary school. In 2011, she enrolled at the University of South Australia in a Bachelor of Management and Marketing course. As of 2012, she lives in Hoyleton, South Australia.

Chapman is 168 centimetres (5 ft 6 in) tall. Her father is David Chapman, who has also represented Australia in sports shooting at the Olympics.

== Shooting ==
Chapman is a sport shooter specialising in pistol shooting. She started the sport in 2006. She is a member of the Balaklava Sports Shooting Club, and held shooting scholarships with the South Australian Sports Institute and South Australia Rifle Pistol Association. She was coached by her father. Since 2008, she has also been coached by Anatoly Babushkin. She was a member of the Australian shooting development squad, which aimed to prepare her for the 2012 Summer Olympics.

At the 2008 Youth Commonwealth Games in India, Chapman won a bronze medal. That year, she competed in the Junior Women's National Championship, where she finished first in the 10m air pistol event. At the 2008 Australian Cup, she finished fourth in the women's open division 10m air pistol event. At the 2011 World Cup 4 in Munich, Germany, she finished 73rd in the 25m pistol event. In the 10m air pistol event, she finished 118th with a score of 362.

=== Olympics ===
Chapman was selected to represent Australia at the 2012 Summer Olympics in shooting in the 25 metre pistol event. As a twenty-year-old, she was nominated to compete alongside her father in London, the first time an Australian father-daughter pair competed in the Olympics at the same Games. She qualified at a Munich-based World Cup event in June, the last available event open to earn a spot.

=== 2014 Commonwealth Games ===
She competed in the women's 25 m pistol event at the 2014 Commonwealth Games.
