= Jocelyn Lees =

New Zealand sport shooter

Medal record

Representing New Zealand

Women's Shooting

Commonwealth Games
Silver medal – second place	1994 Victoria	10m air pistol (pairs)
Silver medal – second place	1998 Kuala Lumpur	10m air pistol (pairs)
Silver medal – second place	1998 Kuala Lumpur	25m pistol (pairs)
Bronze medal – third place	2002 Manchester	25m pistol
Bronze medal – third place	2002 Manchester	25m pistol (pairs)

Jocelyn Lees (born 19 November 1965 in Auckland, New Zealand) is a shooting competitor for New Zealand.

== Life ==
Lees was the first NZ female shooter to win a quota and attend an Olympics. She attended the 1992 Barcelona Olympics.

She won her first Commonwealth Games medal in the 1994 Commonwealth Games, gaining a silver in the women's 10 metre air pistol (pairs) partnering Gerd Barkman. At the 1998 Commonwealth Games partnering Tania Corrigan she won two silver medals; one in the 10 metre air pistol (pairs) and one in the 25 metre pistol (pairs) event. Four years later at the 2002 Commonwealth Games she won two bronze medals; one in the women's 25 metre pistol event, and another in the 25 metre pistol (pairs) event again alongside Tania Corrigan.
