= Deepak Kumar (sport shooter) =

Indian sport shooter (born 1987)

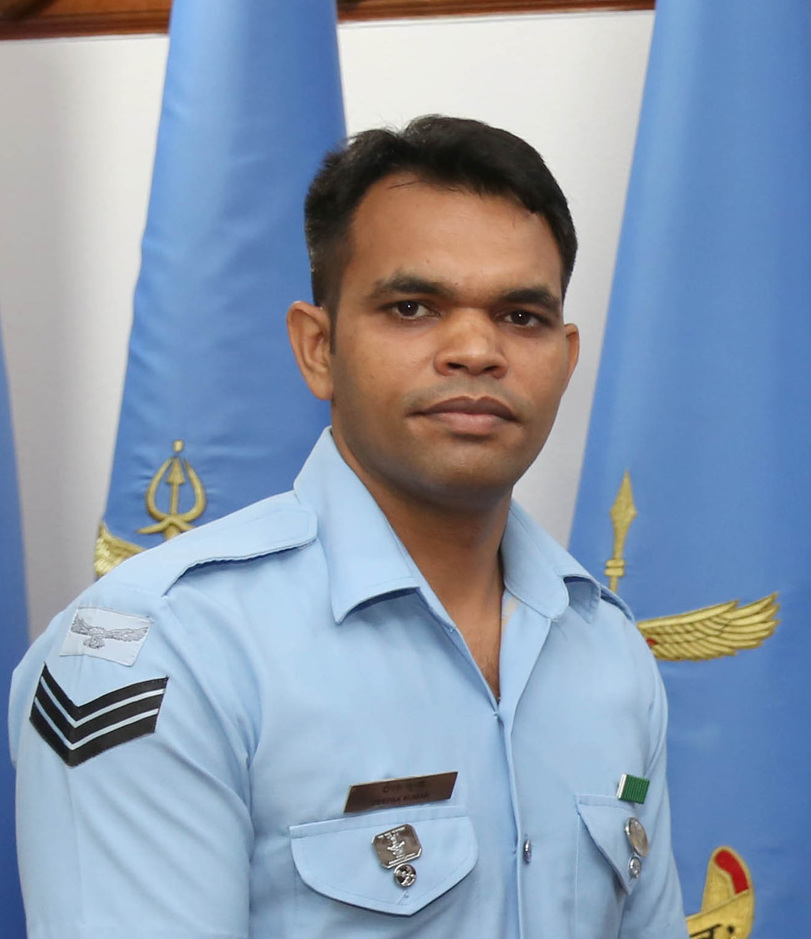
- Kumar in 2018

Personal information
- Born: 5 November 1987 (age 38) Delhi, India
- Military career
- Branch: Indian Air Force
- Service years: 2008–present
- Rank: Junior Warrant Officer

Sport
- Sport: Shooting
- Event: 10 m air rifle
Medal record
Men's 10 m air rifle shooting
Representing India
World Cup
Silver medal – second place	2019 Munich	Mixed team
Silver medal – second place	2021 New Delhi	Team
Silver medal – second place	2022 Baku	50m3P team
Bronze medal – third place	2018 Guadalajara	Mixed team
Asian Games
Silver medal – second place	2018 Palembang	Individual
Asian Championships
Gold medal – first place	2019 Taoyuan	Team
Bronze medal – third place	2019 Doha	Individual
Commonwealth Championships
Bronze medal – third place	2017 Brisbane	Individual

Deepak Kumar (born 5 November 1987) is an Indian former sport shooter and a Senior Non Commissioned officer in the Indian Air Force. Kumar has represented India in the men's 10 m air rifle and 10 m air rifle mixed team events at the 2020 Tokyo Olympics.
