= Yang Qian (sport shooter) =

Chinese sport shooter

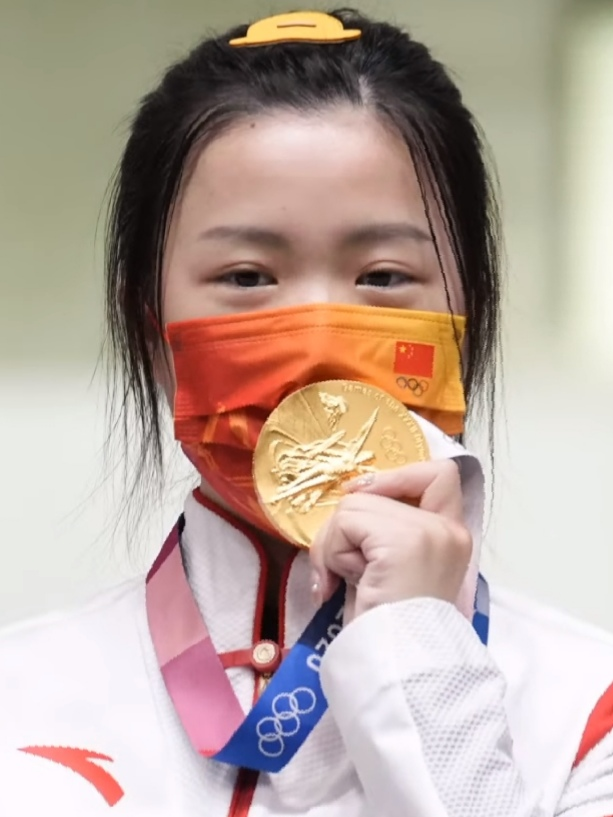
- Yang with gold medal at the 2020 Summer Olympics

Personal information
- Nationality: Chinese
- Born: 10 July 2000 (age 26) Ningbo, Zhejiang, China

Sport
- Sport: Shooting
Medal record
Women's shooting
Representing China
Asian Championships
Gold medal – first place	2019 Doha	10 m air rifle
Silver medal – second place	2019 Doha	10 m air rifle mixed team
Olympic Games
Gold medal – first place	2020 Tokyo	10 metre air rifle
Gold medal – first place	2020 Tokyo	10 meter air rifle mixed team

Yang Qian
- Simplified Chinese: 杨倩
Transcriptions
Standard Mandarin
- Hanyu Pinyin: Yáng Qiàn

Yang Qian (杨倩; born 10 July 2000) is a Chinese sport shooter. She represented China at the 2020 Summer Olympics in Tokyo in summer of 2021, where she won two gold medals.

Born in Ningbo, a port city in southeastern China's Zhejiang province, she started shooting training at the age of 10. She is a graduate of economics and management at Tsinghua University in Beijing.

On July 14, 2021, Yang was listed as part of the official Chinese sport shooting delegation for the 2020 Tokyo Olympic Games. On 24 July 2021, she won the gold medal in women's 10 metre air rifle, which is the first gold medal of this Olympiad. Three days later, she teamed with Yang Haoran to win the gold medal in mixed 10 metre air rifle team in the event's debut on the Olympic stage.
