= Ryan Taylor (sport shooter) =

New Zealand sports shooter

Personal information
- Born: 2 March 1980 (age 46) Palmerston North, New Zealand
- Relative: Grant Taylor (father)

Sport
- Country: New Zealand
- Sport: Sports shooting

Ryan Taylor (born 2 March 1980, in Palmerston North) is a New Zealand rifle shooter. He competed in the 50 m rifle prone event at the 2012 Summer Olympics, where he placed 25th.
