= Bruce Quick =

Australian sports shooter

Personal information
- Full name: Bruce James Quick
- Nationality: Australia
- Born: 4 October 1959 (age 67) Sydney, New South Wales, Australia
- Height: 1.85 m (6 ft 1 in)
- Weight: 94 kg (207 lb)

Sport
- Sport: Shooting
- Event: 25 m Rapid Fire pistol (RF) 50m Pistol ( free pistol)
- Club: Yackandandah Pistol Club
- Coached by: Paul McCormack
Medal record
Men's shooting
Representing Australia
Commonwealth Games
Gold medal – first place	1990 Auckland	Men's 50m Centre-Fire Pistol - Pairs
Bronze medal – third place	1990 Auckland	Men's 25m Centre-Fire Pistol
Silver medal – second place	1998 Kuala Lumpur	Men's 50m Free Pistol - Pairs
Bronze medal – third place	1998 Kuala Lumpur	Men's 50m Free Pistol
Bronze medal – third place	1998 Kuala Lumpur	Men's 50m Centre Fire Pistol -Pairs
Silver medal – second place	2002 Manchester	Men's Rapid Fire Pistol
Silver medal – second place	2002 Manchester	Men's 50m Centre Fire Pistol
Silver medal – second place	2002 Manchester	Men's 50m Free Pistol - Pairs)
Silver medal – second place	2002 Manchester	Men's 50m Centre Fire Pistol Pairs
Bronze medal – third place	2002 Manchester	Men's 25m Rapid Fire Pistol Pairs
Silver medal – second place	2006 Melbourne	Men's 25m Standard Pistol Pairs
Bronze medal – third place	2006 Melbourne	Men's 25m Standard Pistol
Bronze medal – third place	2010 Delhi	RFP (pairs)
Bronze medal – third place	2010 Delhi	RFP (pairs)

Bruce James Quick (born 4 October 1959 in Sydney, New South Wales) is an Australian sport shooter. Since 1988, Quick had won a total of forty three medals (twenty seven gold, six silver, and nine bronze) in the rapid fire, centre fire, standard pistol, 50m pistol and Air pistol at the Oceanian Shooting Championships. He also captured a bronze medal in the rapid fire pistol pairs, along with his partner David Chapman at the 2010 Commonwealth Games in Delhi, India, with a combined score of 1,125 points.

Quick has competed at the 1990, 1998, 2002, 2006, 2010, 2014 and 2018 Commonwealth games, making him the Australian Commonwealth team member with the most appearances as an athlete, winning a total of 14 medals - 1 gold, 9 silver and 4 bronze medals. Quick made his official debut for the 2004 Summer Olympics in Athens, where he competed in the men's 25 m rapid fire pistol. He finished one point behind North Korea's Kim Hyon-Ung, with a total score of 571 targets (283 in the first stage and 288 in the second).

Four years after competing in his last Olympics, Quick qualified for his second Australian team, as a 47-year-old, at the 2008 Summer Olympics in Beijing, by winning the rapid fire pistol from the 2005 Oceanian Shooting Championships, coincidentally in Brisbane, with a score of 754.3 points. Quick hit a total of 560 targets (280 each on the first and second stage) in the preliminary rounds of the men's 25 m rapid fire pistol, finishing two points ahead of Hong Kong's Wong Fai.
