= Ulster Clay Pigeon Shooting Association =

The Ulster Clay Pigeon Shooting Association (UCPSA) is the national governing body for clay target shooting in Northern Ireland.

The association is made up of over 1,000 individual members plus some 50 clubs, a board of directors, discipline reps and secretary. All the clay shooting disciplines are catered for with local club shoots and also the registered shoots from which competitors are classified, championships are contested and international teams selected.

The UCPSA is a constituent member of the International Clay Target Shooting Federation (ICTSF), International Clay Target Shooting Council (ICTSC) and British International Clay Target Shooting Federation (BICTSF).
