= Cameron Pirouet =

British sport shooter

Personal information
- Nationality: British
- Born: 27 November 1998 (age 27) Saint Helier, Jersey
- Height: 182 cm (5 ft 11 3/4 in)
- Weight: 68 kg (150 lb)

Sport
- Country: Jersey
- Sport: Rifle shooting
- Event(s): Smallbore and air rifle
- Club: Jersey Rifle Association
- Coached by: Richard Pirouet (father)
Medal record
Shooting
Representing Jersey
Island Games
Gold medal – first place	2019 Gibraltar	Men's 10 m air rifle
Gold medal – first place	2019 Gibraltar	Mixed 10 m air rifle
Gold medal – first place	2019 Gibraltar	Pairs 10 m air rifle
Gold medal – first place	2019 Gibraltar	Open 50 m rifle 3-position
Gold medal – first place	2019 Gibraltar	Pairs 50 m rifle 3-position
Representing Great Britain
European Championships
Bronze medal – third place	2017 Baku	Junior men's 50 m rifle prone

Cameron Adam Snowden Pirouet (/ˈpɪrueɪ/, PI-roo-ay; born 27 November 1998) is a Jersey born British sport shooter. He has represented Jersey at both the Island Games–at which he holds four games records–and the Commonwealth Games; his best result is a fourth-place finish in the Men's Smallbore Rifle event in 2018.

== Biography ==
=== Early life and career ===
Born and raised in Jersey, Pirouet was educated at Victoria College. He represented the school at the schools' championships at Bisley was a member of the British Cadet Rifle Team, more commonly known as the Athelings, for their tour to Canada in 2016. He went on to read Psychology at Cardiff Metropolitan University.

Pirouet first represented Great Britain in 2017, finishing third in the Junior Men's 50 m Rifle event at the European Shooting Championships held in Baku, Azerbaijan. He is part of British Shooting's high-performance programme.

=== Senior career ===
In 2018, Pirouet was selected to represent Jersey at the Commonwealth Games held in Gold Coast, Australia. He finished fourth in the Men's 50 m Rifle 3 Positions event; although failed to qualify for the finals of the Men's 50 m Rifle Prone and 10 m Air Rifle events, placing sixteenth and thirteenth respectively.

In 2019, Pirouet represented Jersey at the 2019 Island Games held in Gibraltar. He competed in both Air Rifle and Smallbore events, winning five gold medals and breaking four games records. For his performances in 2019, Pirouet was nominated for the Channel Islands Sports Personality of the Year award, the first shooter to be shortlisted since the award's inception in 2002.

== Statistics ==
=== International competitions ===
Year	Competition	Venue	Position	Event	Notes
Representing Great Britain
2017	European Shooting Championships	Baku, Azerbaijan	3rd	Junior Men's 50 m Rifle Prone	226.0
Representing Jersey
2018	Commonwealth Games	Queensland, Australia	4th	Men's 50 m Rifle 3 Positions	428.8
2018	Commonwealth Games	Queensland, Australia	16th	Men's 50 m Rifle Prone	605.8
2018	Commonwealth Games	Queensland, Australia	13th	Men's 10 m Air Rifle	608.9
2019	Island Games	Gibraltar	1st	Open 50 m Rifle 3-position	443.1 GR
2019	Island Games	Gibraltar	1st	Pairs 50 m Rifle 3-position	2219 GR
2019	Island Games	Gibraltar	1st	Men's 10 m Air Rifle	247.9 GR
2019	Island Games	Gibraltar	1st	Mixed 10 m Air Rifle	483.4
2019	Island Games	Gibraltar	1st	Pairs 10 m Air Rifle	1217.2 GR

== Personal life ==
Pirouet is right-handed and shoots using his right eye. His father, Richard, is also a sport shooter; he was British pistol champion in 1991 and represented Jersey in the pistol events at the 1990 Commonwealth Games. In 2019, Pirouet was named as Jersey's Sports Person of the Year by the Jersey Sports Council, an honour previously bestowed upon his father Richard in 1991 following the latter's British pistol shooting triumph.
