= Sydney International Shooting Centre =

Shooting range in Cecil Park, New South Wales

Coordinates: 33°53′20″S 150°49′7″E

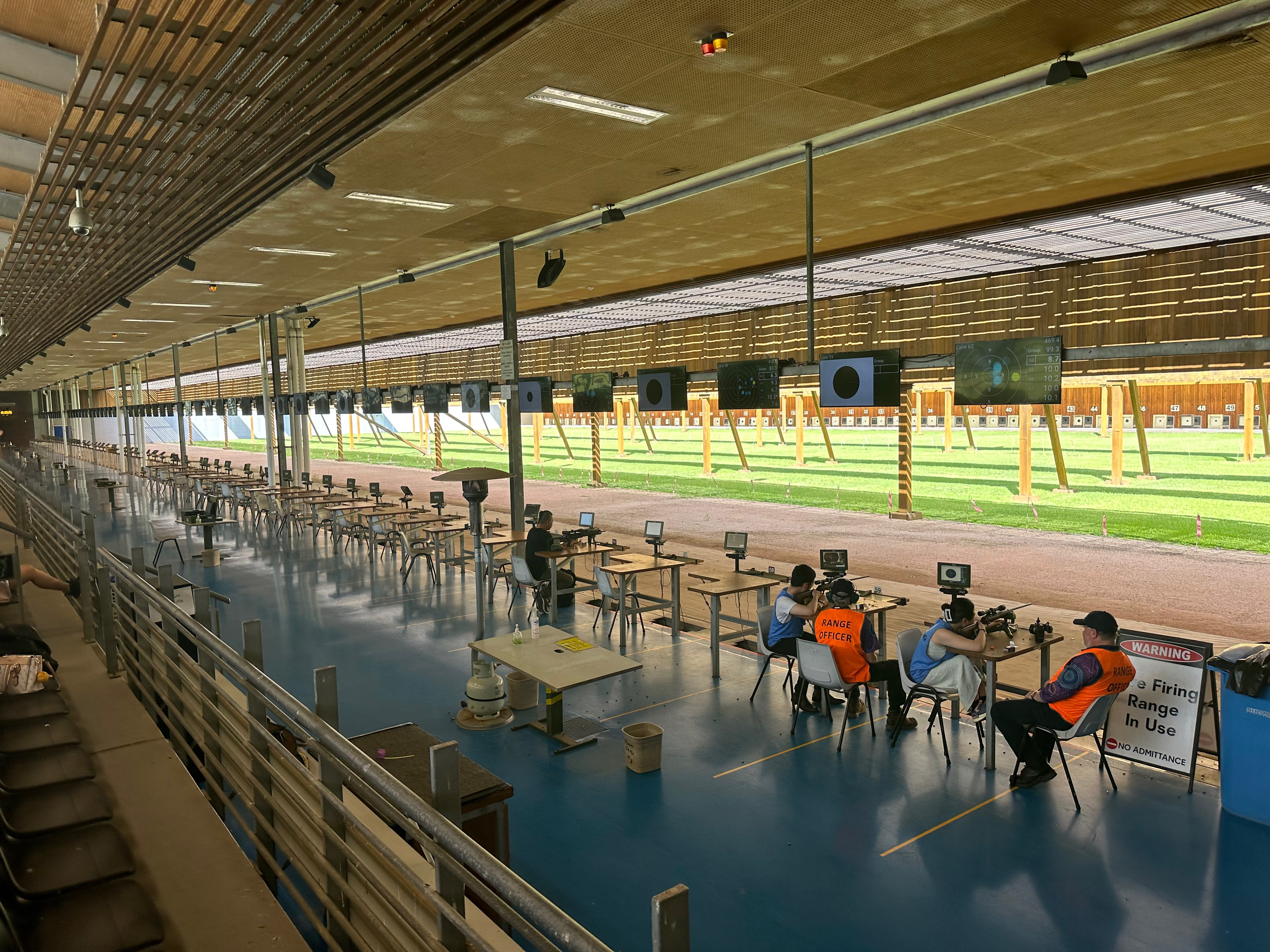
The Sydney International Shooting Centre in Cecil Park, New South Wales.

The Sydney International Shooting Centre in Cecil Park, New South Wales, Australia was built for the shooting events at the 2000 Summer Olympics. It has also been used for ISSF World Cup events in 2002, 2004, 2007 and the 2007 rifle and pistol events. It has hosted the Oceania Shooting Federation Oceania Shooting Championships since 1999 and is available for licensed shooters to use the facilities on a day-by-day basis.

== See also ==
- Sydney International Shooting Centre
- 2000 Summer Olympics venues
