= Grant Taylor (sport shooter) =

New Zealand sports shooter (born 1950)

Personal information
- Born: Denis Grant Taylor; 26 July 1950 (age 76) Levin, New Zealand
- Relative: Ryan Taylor (son)

Sport
- Country: New Zealand
- Sport: Sports shooting

Denis Grant Taylor (born 26 July 1950) is a New Zealand sports shooter. He competed in the men's 50 metre running target event at the 1976 Summer Olympics.
