= Katarina Kowplos =

Australian sports shooter

Personal information
- Nationality: Australian
- Born: 5 October 2001 (age 23)

Sport
- Sport: Sports shooting

Katarina Kowplos (born 5 October 2001) is an Australian sports shooter.

Kowplos represented Australia at the 2020 Summer Olympics in Tokyo, Japan. She competed in the women's 10 metre air rifle, the women's 50 metre rifle three positions event, and the mixed 10 metre air rifle team events. She did not score sufficient points in either event to advance past qualification.
