= William Godward =

Australian sports shooter

Personal information
- Born: 15 April 1984 (age 42) Townsville, Queensland, Australia

Sport
- Sport: Sports shooting

William Godward (born 15 April 1984) is an Australian sports shooter. He competed in the Men's 10 metre air rifle event at the 2012 Summer Olympics and the Men's three position rifle event at the 2016 Summer Olympics.
