= Jack Rossiter =

Australian sports shooter

Personal information
- Full name: Jack Thomas Venning Rossiter
- Born: 13 June 1997 (age 29) Ashford, Adelaide, South Australia
- Home town: Adelaide, South Australia
- Height: 171 cm (5 ft 7 in)
- Weight: 70 kg (154 lb)

Sport
- Sport: Sports shooting
- Club: Reynella Smallbore & Air Rifle Club
Medal record
Men's shooting
Representing Australia
Commonwealth Championships
Silver medal – second place	2017 Brisbane	10 m air rifle

Jack Thomas Venning Rossiter (born 13 June 1997) is an Australian sports shooter. He competed in the men's 10 metre air rifle event at the 2016 Summer Olympics.

Rossiter represented Australia at the 2020 Summer Olympics in Tokyo, Japan. He competed in the men's 50 metre rifle three positions event. He did not score sufficient points to advance past qualification.
