= David Chapman (Australian sport shooter) =

Australian sport shooter

Personal information
- Nationality: Australia
- Born: 22 March 1965 (age 61)

Sport
- Sport: Shooting
- Event: 25 m service pistol (SP)
Medal record
Men's shooting
Representing Australia
Commonwealth Games
Silver medal – second place	2006 Melbourne	RFP (pairs)
Bronze medal – third place	2010 Delhi	RFP (pairs)
Gold medal – first place	2014 Glasgow	25 m RFP

David Chapman (born 22 March 1965) is an Australian sport shooter who competed at two Olympic Games. He competed in the 25-metre rapid-fire pistol at the 2000 Summer Olympics in Sydney, finishing in 20th place. He returned to the Olympic team for the 2012 London Olympics where he competed in the same event, finishing 18th.

His daughter Hayley Chapman also competed in London, in the 25-metre pistol event.
