= Aislin Jones =

Australian sport shooter (born 2000)

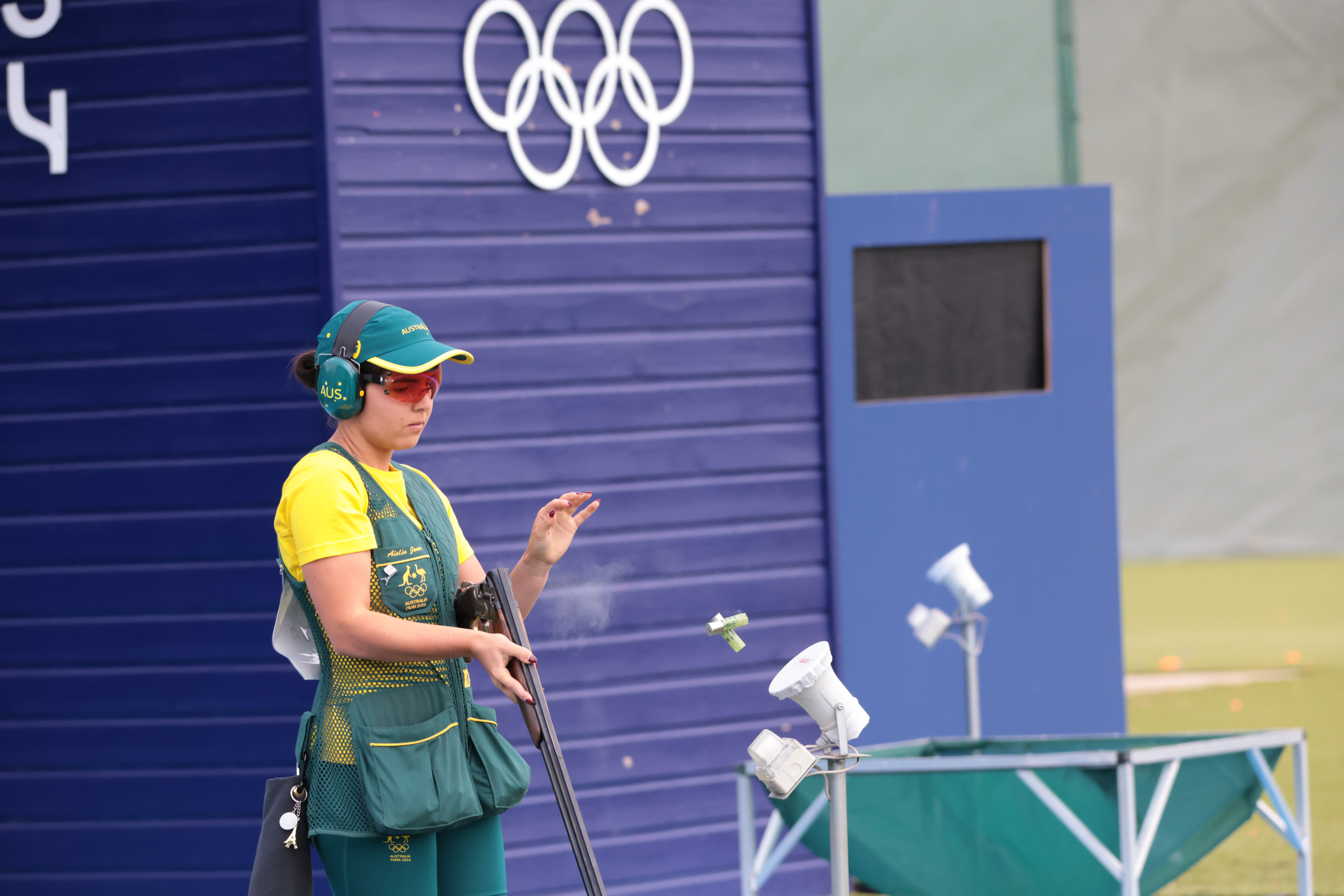
- Aislin Jones - Paris Olympics 2024

Personal information
- Nationality: Australia
- Born: 8 February 2000 (age 26) Shepparton, Australia
- Years active: 2012-present
- Height: 1.60 m (5 ft 3 in)

Sport
- Country: Australia
- Sport: Sport shooter
- Rank: 35
- Events: ISSF Women's Skeet, ISSF Skeet Mixed Teams
- Coached by: David Jones, Lauryn Mark
Medal record
Women's shooting
Representing Australia
ISSF World Cup
Bronze medal – third place	Baku	Mixed Teams Skeet
ISSF Junior World Cup
Gold medal – first place	2018 Sydney	Skeet
ISSF Junior Cup
Silver medal – second place	2017 Suhl	Skeet
ISSF Junior Cup
Silver medal – second place	2017 Suhl	Skeet
ISSF Regional Championships
Gold medal – first place	2023 Oceania Championship	Skeet
Silver medal – second place	2017 National Championship	Skeet
Bronze medal – third place	2019 National Championship	Skeet
Bronze medal – third place	2015 National Championship	Skeet
ACTA National Championships
Gold medal – first place	2024 National Championship	Skeet
Gold medal – first place	2023 National Championship	Skeet
Gold medal – first place	2022 National Championship	Skeet
	2021 No National Championship event COVID	Skeet
Gold medal – first place	2020 National Championship	Skeet
Gold medal – first place	2019 National Championship	Skeet
Gold medal – first place	2017 National Championship	Skeet
Gold medal – first place	2016 National Championship	Skeet
Silver medal – second place	2015 National Championship	Skeet

Aislin Jones (/æʃˈlɪn/ ash-LIN; born 8 February 2000) is an Australian women's skeet shooter. She won the Australian National Championship in January 2016, becoming the youngest woman ever to hold that title. She is the current Oceania Region Junior Women's Skeet Record holder.

== Education ==
In 2018 Jones is completed her Victorian Certificate of Education at Nagle College in Bairnsdale, Victoria Australia.

After an extended gap year during which Jones competed internationally and studied a Cert IV in Fitness with FitNation, she commenced a Bachelor of Commerce at Deakin University which she is undertaking part time on a part sports scholarship.

== Career ==
=== Early and domestic ===
Jones developed an interest in shooting while following her father David Jones, around the Bairnsdale Field and Game clay target range from an early age. She started shooting in 2012 and switched from simulated field to skeet later that year. Jones competed in her first Australian Clay Target Association (ACTA) national championships at the age of 13, held at Wagga Wagga in 2013. The following year Jones won six medals at the ACTA national championships at Wagga Wagga and the National Women's Champion of Champions in the mixed 12 gauge/20 gauge event with a score of 99/100.

In late 2014 Jones switched from American Skeet to ISSF skeet in order to achieve her Olympic and Commonwealth Games aspirations. At her first competitive ISSF skeet shoot in October 2014, she won the Victorian Ladies' Championship at Werribee Clay Target Club.

=== International ===
In 2015 Jones competed in her first international competition, finishing 23rd in the junior world championships and 6th in the ISSF junior cup. In early 2016 she became the youngest winner of the Australian National Skeet Championship at the age of 15.

Jones represented Australia in Women's Skeet at the Rio Olympic Games in 2016, finishing in 17th place. Jones was the second youngest Australian athlete, and the youngest of the 390 shooting athletes from around the world. At 16 years of age, she was also the youngest Australian shooter ever to compete at any Olympic Games.

In October 2017 Jones broke the Oceania Women's Skeet, junior and senior records and in January 2018, at the Australian Nationals in Echuca she won the Commonwealth championship, Australian Championship and High Gun.

In March 2018 she won her first ISSF gold medal at the Junior World Cup in Sydney.

Jones has been named in the Australian shooting team for the 2018 Commonwealth Games and finished 6th, after finishing second in the qualifying round.

Competing at ISSF Junior World Championships in 2018 in Changwon (9th), 2019 in Lonato (11th) rounded out her international junior career without the opportunity to compete during COVID interruptions to international travel. During the COVID period where international travel and competition was particularly difficult, Jones competed at state and national championships.

Returning to international competition and moving from junior to open competition Jones competed at the 2022 & 2023 World Championships in Osijek & Baku finishing 33rd & 27th respectively.

Jones achieved Qualifying Ranking Points for the Paris Olympic Games at each of the ISSF World Cups attended during the Paris Qualifying Ranking period.

In November 2023 Jones won the gold medal at the ISSF Oceania Regional Championships in Brisbane attaining a quota place for the Paris 2024 Olympics for Australia.

The selection series run by Shooting Australia to determine the athlete nominated to compete for Australia at the Paris Olympics was conducted from January 2024 to May 2024. Commencing with two events at the Australian National Championships in Brisbane, it included the NSW Clay Target Association State Championships in February 2024 and the domestic series concluded with the Yarra Valley Grand Prix at Melbourne Gun Club in Victoria. At the conclusion of the domestic series Jones had a 6 point lead over Laura Coles from Western Australia.

The top three athletes from the domestic series progressed to the ISSF Olympic Qualification Championship in Doha, Qatar and the ISSF World Cup in Baku, Azerbaijan. At the Doha event Jones placed 27th but added 5 points in the Australian selection series to take her lead to 11 over Coles and 40 points over Britany Melbourne.

At her first ISSF World Cup for 2024 in Baku, Jones finished 8th. Adding a further 14 points to her selection total at this event Jones finished 25 points clear of Coles and 58 points ahead of Melbourne, securing her nomination to the Australian Olympic Committee for her second Olympic Team to represent Australia in Paris. Aislin was subsequently announced as part of team on 27 June.

At the ISSF World Cup in Baku, Jones teamed with Joshua Bell in the Mixed Skeet Teams event. They won the bronze medal final against Team USA 1 (Austen Smith and Connor Prince, who both went on to medal at the Paris Olympics.) In a nail biting moment for spectators the medal was decided by the final pair of targets, with Jones under pressure and required to hit all four targets at the final station to take the medal.

Jones competed at the 2024 Olympics in Paris on 3–4 August 2024 in the individual women's skeet event finishing 25th, followed by the mixed teams event on 5 August 2024 with Australian men's skeet teammate, Joshua Bell from Sydney finishing 11th at the Paris Olympic shooting venue in Châteauroux.

== Personal life ==
Jones grew up in Lakes Entrance, in southeast Victoria. Her parents still reside in Lakes Entrance and she returns home for coaching with father David at Bairnsdale Field and Game, and Bairnsdale Clay Target Club. During COVID Jones built a house in Leongatha with her partner and moved to South Gippsland, closer to university, her coach Lauryn Mark and Melbourne Airport.

When not competing, Jones enjoys distance running and interestingly competed in her debut marathon during the Paris Olympics after concluding competition in her own events in the Marathon Pour Tous, on the Olympic marathon course.

== Awards ==
- Gippsland Sports Academy Gippstar Award 2017.
- East Gippsland Shire Young Citizen of the Year 2018, for outstanding contribution to her sport.
