= Shooting Australia =

Governing body for target shooting sports in Australia

- Sport: Shooting
- Jurisdiction: Australia
- Abbreviation: SA
- Affiliation: ISSF
- Regional affiliation: OSF
- Headquarters: South Australia
- CEO: Adam Sachs
- Coach: Rifle National Coach Petr Kurka, Shotgun Olympic Athlete Coach Renae Birgan, Para / Shooting Technical Lead Catherine Berry, Pistol National Coach Vladimir Galiabovich

Official website
- www.shootingaustralia.org
- (Australia)

Shooting Australia is the governing body for shooting sports in Australia. The company is registered as Australian International Shooting Limited, but trades under the Shooting Australia brand.

== About ==
Shooting Australia is the peak body responsible for the growth, sustainability, and success of target shooting sports in Australia. It represents Australian shooters internationally via the International Shooting Sport Federation; Commonwealth Shooting Federation and International Metallic Silhouette Shooting Union.

Shooting Australia is recognised domestically by the Australian Sports Commission; Australian Olympic Committee; Australian Paralympic Committee; and the Australian Commonwealth Games Association as the National Sporting Organisation for target shooting sports.

Shooting Australia's objectives are to promote and coordinate responsible shooting sports, both competitive and recreational, within Australia; and to promote and coordinate participation in, and organisation of international competitions mindful of providing sustainable international success.

Target shooting is a sport which features on the program of both the Commonwealth Games and the Olympic Games.

== Structure ==
SA is a company limited by guarantee comprising five full member organisations:

- Australian Clay Target Association
- Sporting Clays Australia
- National Rifle Association of Australia
- Pistol Australia
- Target Rifle Australia

and an associate member:

- NSW Shooting Association
