= Dane Sampson =

Australian sports shooter

Personal information
- Nationality: Australian
- Born: 20 August 1986 (age 39) Blacktown, New South Wales, Australia
- Height: 183 cm (6 ft 0 in)
- Weight: 83 kg (183 lb)

Sport
- Country: Australia
- Sport: Shooting
- Event(s): 10 metre air rifle, 50 metre rifle three positions, 50 metre rifle prone
- Club: Commercial Small Bore Rifle Club
- Coached by: Petr Kurka
Medal record
Men's shooting
Representing Australia
Commonwealth Games
Gold medal – first place	2018 Gold Coast	10 m air rifle
Commonwealth Championships
Gold medal – first place	2017 Brisbane	50 m rifle prone
Bronze medal – third place	2017 Brisbane	50 m rifle three positions

Dane Sampson (born 20 August 1986) is an Australian sports shooter. He competed in the 10 metre air rifle, 50 metre rifle three positions and 50 metre rifle prone events at the 2012 Summer Olympics.

Sampson began shooting in 1998, encouraged by his parents who are both sports shooters. He made his international debut at the 2011 World Cup event in Munich.

He worked as an antiques restorer in order to fund his shooting.

Sampson qualified to represent Australia at the 2020 Summer Olympics. He competed in the men's 10 metre air rifle, the men's 50 metre rifle three positions event, and the mixed 10 metre air rifle team events. He did not score sufficient points in either event to advance past qualification.
