= Keith Ferguson (sport shooter) =

Australian sport shooter

Personal information
- Born: 7 September 1979 (age 46)

Sport
- Country: Australia
- Sport: Shooting sports

Keith Ferguson is an Australian sport shooter. At the 2012 Summer Olympics he competed in the Men's skeet, finishing in 20th place.
