= Paul Adams (sport shooter) =

Australian sports shooter (born 1992)

Personal information
- Born: 4 June 1992 (age 34) Toowoomba, Australia
- Occupation: Nurse
- Height: 185 cm (6 ft 1 in)
- Weight: 98 kg (216 lb)

Sport
- Sport: Sports shooting
- Event: Skeet shooting
- Club: Brisbane Gun Club
Medal record
Men's shooting
Representing Australia
Commonwealth Championships
Bronze medal – third place	2017 Brisbane	Skeet

Paul Adams (born 4 June 1992) is an Australian sports shooter. He competed in the men's skeet event at the 2016 Summer Olympics and at the 2018 Commonwealth Games. Adams represented Australia at the 2020 Summer Olympics in Tokyo, Japan. He competed in the men's skeet event but did not score sufficient points to advance past qualification.

== Personal life ==
On 13 October 2018, Adams joined the Royal Australian Navy Reserve as a Nursing Officer.
