= Oceania Shooting Championships =

Shooting competition held every two years

The Oceania Continental Shooting Championships are governed by the Oceania Shooting Federation (OSF). Oceania Shooting Championships began in 1988 and are considered to be Oceania's continental championships for shooting events governed by the International Shooting Sport Federation. The Championships are held every two years. Editions held in the year prior to a summer Olympic Games are part of the Olympic quota allocation system.

== Oceania Shooting Championships ==
#	Year	Venue	Date
1	1988	Christchurch, New Zealand	
2	1991	Adelaide, Australia	
3	1993	Auckland, New Zealand	
4	1995	Auckland, New Zealand	
5	1997	Adelaide, Australia	
6	1999	Sydney, Australia	
7	2001	Auckland, New Zealand	
8	2003	Auckland, New Zealand	November 15–22
9	2005	Brisbane, Australia	
10	2007	Sydney, Australia	October 27 – November 4
11	2009	Sydney, Australia	
12	2011	Sydney, Australia	November 27 – December 4
13	2013	Sydney, Australia	
14	2015	Sydney, Australia	November 27 – December 2
15	2017	Gold Coast, Australia	
16	2019	Sydney, Australia	November 1–9
17	2023	Brisbane, Australia	October 30 – November 6
-	2025	No Competition	
18	2027	Brisbane & Melbourne, Australia	November 17–24
