= 2021 ISSF World Cup =

- Sport: Shooting
- Hosts: (India) New Delhi (South Korea) Changwon (Azerbaijan) Baku (Croatia) Osijek (Egypt) Cairo
- Duration: 18 March – 24 October

Seasons
- ← 2020 2022 →

The 2021 ISSF World Cup is the annual edition of the ISSF World Cup in the Olympic shooting events, governed by the International Shooting Sport Federation.

In 2020, due to the COVID-19 pandemic, the only stage that went ahead as planned was the first stage of the shotgun world cup in Nicosia, Cyprus.

ISSF has renamed the year end ISSF World Cup Final to ISSF Champions Cup, the tournament will be conducted in Baku, Azerbaijan from 18 to 24 October.

The two Baku legs of the World Cup for Rifle/Pistol/Shotgun was cancelled due to a surge in COVID-19 cases in the host country.

== Men's results ==
=== Rifle events ===
50 metre rifle three positions			10 metre air rifle		
New Delhi India (18-29 Mar)			New Delhi India (18-29 Mar)		
1st place, gold medalist(s)	Aishwary Pratap Singh Tomar (IND)	462.5	1st place, gold medalist(s)	Lucas Kozeniesky (USA)	249.8
2nd place, silver medalist(s)	István Péni (HUN)	461.6	2nd place, silver medalist(s)	István Péni (HUN)	249.7
3rd place, bronze medalist(s)	Steffen Olsen (DEN)	450.9	3rd place, bronze medalist(s)	Divyansh Singh Panwar (IND)	228.1
Changwon South Korea			Changwon South Korea		
1st place, gold medalist(s)			1st place, gold medalist(s)		
2nd place, silver medalist(s)			2nd place, silver medalist(s)		
3rd place, bronze medalist(s)			3rd place, bronze medalist(s)		
Baku Azerbaijan (21 Jun-02 Jul)			Baku Azerbaijan (21 Jun-02 Jul)		
1st place, gold medalist(s)	Cancelled		1st place, gold medalist(s)	Cancelled	
2nd place, silver medalist(s)	Cancelled		2nd place, silver medalist(s)	Cancelled	
3rd place, bronze medalist(s)	Cancelled		3rd place, bronze medalist(s)	Cancelled	
Osijek Croatia (22 Jun – 3 Jul)			Osijek Croatia (22 Jun – 3 Jul)		
1st place, gold medalist(s)	Serhiy Kulish (UKR)	460.0	1st place, gold medalist(s)	William Shaner (USA)	250.5
2nd place, silver medalist(s)	Sergey Kamenskiy (RUS)	458.6	2nd place, silver medalist(s)	Vladimir Maslennikov (RUS)	249.2
3rd place, bronze medalist(s)	Patrik Jány (SVK)	447.6	3rd place, bronze medalist(s)	Petar Gorša (CRO)	227.7
Champions Cup – Baku Azerbaijan (18-24 Oct)			Champions Cup – Baku Azerbaijan (18-24 Oct)		
1st place, gold medalist(s)			1st place, gold medalist(s)		
2nd place, silver medalist(s)			2nd place, silver medalist(s)		
3rd place, bronze medalist(s)			3rd place, bronze medalist(s)		

=== Pistol events ===
25 metre rapid fire pistol			10 metre air pistol		
New Delhi India (18-29 Mar)			New Delhi India (18-29 Mar)		
1st place, gold medalist(s)	Peeter Olesk (EST)	26 S-off 4	1st place, gold medalist(s)	Javad Foroughi (IRI)	243.6
2nd place, silver medalist(s)	Vijayveer Sidhu (IND)	26 S-off 1	2nd place, silver medalist(s)	Saurabh Chaudhary (IND)	243.2
3rd place, bronze medalist(s)	Oskar Miliwek (POL)	20	3rd place, bronze medalist(s)	Abhishek Verma (IND)	221.8
Changwon South Korea			Changwon South Korea		
1st place, gold medalist(s)			1st place, gold medalist(s)		
2nd place, silver medalist(s)			2nd place, silver medalist(s)		
3rd place, bronze medalist(s)			3rd place, bronze medalist(s)		
Baku Azerbaijan (21 Jun-02 Jul)			Baku Azerbaijan (21 Jun-02 Jul)		
1st place, gold medalist(s)	Cancelled		1st place, gold medalist(s)	Cancelled	
2nd place, silver medalist(s)	Cancelled		2nd place, silver medalist(s)	Cancelled	
3rd place, bronze medalist(s)	Cancelled		3rd place, bronze medalist(s)	Cancelled	
Osijek Croatia (22 Jun – 3 Jul)			Osijek Croatia (22 Jun – 3 Jul)		
1st place, gold medalist(s)	Jean Quiquampoix (FRA)	35	1st place, gold medalist(s)	Javad Foroughi (IRI)	243.0
2nd place, silver medalist(s)	Christian Reitz (GER)	34	2nd place, silver medalist(s)	Damir Mikec (SRB)	241.7
3rd place, bronze medalist(s)	Oliver Geis (GER)	26	3rd place, bronze medalist(s)	Saurabh Chaudhary (IND)	220.0
Champions Cup – Baku Azerbaijan (18-24 Oct)			Champions Cup – Baku Azerbaijan (18-24 Oct)		
1st place, gold medalist(s)			1st place, gold medalist(s)		
2nd place, silver medalist(s)			2nd place, silver medalist(s)		
3rd place, bronze medalist(s)			3rd place, bronze medalist(s)		

=== Shotgun events ===
Trap			Skeet		
Cario Egypt (22 Feb-5 Mar)			Cario Egypt (22 Feb-5 Mar)		
1st place, gold medalist(s)	Anton Glasnović (CRO)	47	1st place, gold medalist(s)	Mickola Milchev (UKR)	53
2nd place, silver medalist(s)	Joan Garcia (ESP)	44	2nd place, silver medalist(s)	Jesper Hansen (DEN)	52
3rd place, bronze medalist(s)	Alberto Fernández (ESP)	34	3rd place, bronze medalist(s)	Rashid Hamar (QAT)	41
New Delhi India (18-29 Mar)			New Delhi India (18-29 Mar)		
1st place, gold medalist(s)	Daniele Resca (ITA)	46	1st place, gold medalist(s)	Jesper Hansen (DEN)	58
2nd place, silver medalist(s)	Alberto Fernández (ESP)	45	2nd place, silver medalist(s)	Saif Bin Futais (UAE)	51
3rd place, bronze medalist(s)	Valerio Grazini (ITA)	35	3rd place, bronze medalist(s)	Nasser Al-Attiya (QAT)	44
Changwon South Korea			Changwon South Korea		
1st place, gold medalist(s)			1st place, gold medalist(s)		
2nd place, silver medalist(s)			2nd place, silver medalist(s)		
3rd place, bronze medalist(s)			3rd place, bronze medalist(s)		
Lonato Italy (7-17 May)			Lonato Italy (7-17 May)		
1st place, gold medalist(s)	Talal Alrashidi (KUW)	46	1st place, gold medalist(s)	Azmy Mehelba (EGY)	56
2nd place, silver medalist(s)	Gennadii Mamkin (RUS)	45	2nd place, silver medalist(s)	Vincent Hancock (USA)	55
3rd place, bronze medalist(s)	Abdel Aziz Mehelba (EGY)	36	3rd place, bronze medalist(s)	Tammaro Cassandro (ITA)	45
Baku Azerbaijan (21 Jun-02 Jul)			Baku Azerbaijan (21 Jun-02 Jul)		
1st place, gold medalist(s)	Cancelled		1st place, gold medalist(s)	Cancelled	
2nd place, silver medalist(s)	Cancelled		2nd place, silver medalist(s)	Cancelled	
3rd place, bronze medalist(s)	Cancelled		3rd place, bronze medalist(s)	Cancelled	
Osijek Croatia (22 Jun – 3 Jul)			Osijek Croatia (22 Jun – 3 Jul)		
1st place, gold medalist(s)	Mauro De Filippis (ITA)	48	1st place, gold medalist(s)	Tammaro Cassandro (ITA)	55 S-off 2
2nd place, silver medalist(s)	Ioannis Chatzitsakiroglou (GRE)	46	2nd place, silver medalist(s)	Federico Gil (ARG)	55 S-off 1
3rd place, bronze medalist(s)	Giovanni Cernogoraz (CRO)	35	3rd place, bronze medalist(s)	Nicolas Vasiliou (CYP)	43
Champions Cup – Baku Azerbaijan (18-24 Oct)			Champions Cup – Baku Azerbaijan (18-24 Oct)		
1st place, gold medalist(s)			1st place, gold medalist(s)		
2nd place, silver medalist(s)			2nd place, silver medalist(s)		
3rd place, bronze medalist(s)			3rd place, bronze medalist(s)		

=== Team Results ===
	10 metre air pistol			10 metre air rifle			25 metre rapid fire pistol			50 metre rifle three positions			Skeet			Trap		
Cairo Egypt (22 Feb-5 Mar)	No Rifle/Pistol events												1st place, gold medalist(s)	Sergey Demin; Aleksey Skorobogatov; Alexander Zemlin (RUS)	6	1st place, gold medalist(s)	Anton Glasnović; Giovanni Cernogoraz; Josip Glasnović (CRO)	6
Cairo Egypt (22 Feb-5 Mar)	No Rifle/Pistol events												2nd place, silver medalist(s)	Tomas Nydrle; Milos Slavicek; Jacub Tomecek (CZE)	0	2nd place, silver medalist(s)	Gennadii Mamkin; Maxim Kabatskiy; Alexy Alipov (RUS)	2
Cairo Egypt (22 Feb-5 Mar)	No Rifle/Pistol events												3rd place, bronze medalist(s)	Gurjoat Siingh Khangura; Angad Vir Singh Bajwa; Mairaj Ahmad Khan (IND)	6 BMM	3rd place, bronze medalist(s)	Ahmed Kamar; Abdel Aziz Mehelba; Ahmed Zaher (EGY)	6 BMM
New Delhi India (18-29 Mar)	1st place, gold medalist(s)	Saurabh Chaudhary; Shahzar Rizvi; Abhishek Verma (IND)	17	1st place, gold medalist(s)	Lucas Kozeniesky; William Shaner; Timothy Sherry (USA)	16	1st place, gold medalist(s)	Keith Sanderson; III Jack Hobson Leverett; Henry Turner Leverett (USA)	10	1st place, gold medalist(s)	Swapnil Kusale; Chain Singh; Neeraj Kumar (IND)	47	1st place, gold medalist(s)	Gurjoat Siingh Khangura; Angad Vir Singh Bajwa; Mairaj Ahmad Khan (IND)	6	1st place, gold medalist(s)	Kynan Chenai; Prithviraj Tondaiman; Lakshay (IND)	6
New Delhi India (18-29 Mar)	2nd place, silver medalist(s)	Nguyen Dinh Thanh; Trần Quốc Cường; Phan Xuan Chuyen (VIE)	11	2nd place, silver medalist(s)	Aishwary Pratap Singh Tomar; Deepak Kumar; Pankaj Kumar (IND)	14	2nd place, silver medalist(s)	Vijayveer Sindhu; Adarsh Singh; Gurpreet Singh (IND)	2	2nd place, silver medalist(s)	Nickolaus Mowrer; Patrick Sunderman; Timothy Sherry (USA)	25	2nd place, silver medalist(s)	Nasser Al-Attiya; Ali Ahmed A O Al-Ishaq; Rashid Ahmad (QAT)	2	2nd place, silver medalist(s)	Michael Slamka; Adrian Drobny; Filip Marinov (SVK)	4
New Delhi India (18-29 Mar)	3rd place, bronze medalist(s)	No Bronze Medal Match		3rd place, bronze medalist(s)	Choo Byounggil; Chung Jae Seung; Nam Tae-yun (KOR)	17 BMM	3rd place, bronze medalist(s)	No Bronze Medal Match		3rd place, bronze medalist(s)	No Bronze Medal Match		3rd place, bronze medalist(s)	Alexadr Mukhamediyev; Eduard Yechshenko; David Pochivalov (KAZ)	0 No Bronze Medal Match	3rd place, bronze medalist(s)	Viktor Khassyanov; Maxim Kolomoyets; Andrey Mogilevskiy (KAZ)	6 BMM
Changwon South Korea	1st place, gold medalist(s)			1st place, gold medalist(s)			1st place, gold medalist(s)			1st place, gold medalist(s)			1st place, gold medalist(s)			1st place, gold medalist(s)		
Changwon South Korea	2nd place, silver medalist(s)			2nd place, silver medalist(s)			2nd place, silver medalist(s)			2nd place, silver medalist(s)			2nd place, silver medalist(s)			2nd place, silver medalist(s)		
Changwon South Korea	3rd place, bronze medalist(s)			3rd place, bronze medalist(s)			3rd place, bronze medalist(s)			3rd place, bronze medalist(s)			3rd place, bronze medalist(s)			3rd place, bronze medalist(s)		
Lonato Italy (7-17 May)	No Rifle/Pistol events												1st place, gold medalist(s)	Tammaro Cassandro; Luigi Lodde; Gabriele Rossetti (ITA)	7	1st place, gold medalist(s)	Clement Bourgue; Antonin Desert; Sebastien Guerrero (FRA)	7
Lonato Italy (7-17 May)	No Rifle/Pistol events												2nd place, silver medalist(s)	Mikkel Petersen; Jesper Hansen; Emil Kjelgaard Petersen (DEN)	5	2nd place, silver medalist(s)	Aleksey Alipov; Gennadii Mamkin; Maxim Kabatskiy (RUS)	1
Lonato Italy (7-17 May)	No Rifle/Pistol events												3rd place, bronze medalist(s)	Emmanuel Petit; Éric Delaunay; Anthony Terras (FRA)	7 BMM	3rd place, bronze medalist(s)	Giovanni Cernogoraz; Josip Glasnović; Anton Glasnović (CRO)	6 BMM
Baku Azerbaijan (21 Jun-02 Jul)	1st place, gold medalist(s)	Cancelled		1st place, gold medalist(s)	Cancelled		1st place, gold medalist(s)	Cancelled		1st place, gold medalist(s)	Cancelled		1st place, gold medalist(s)	Cancelled		1st place, gold medalist(s)	Cancelled	
Baku Azerbaijan (21 Jun-02 Jul)	2nd place, silver medalist(s)	Cancelled		2nd place, silver medalist(s)	Cancelled		2nd place, silver medalist(s)	Cancelled		2nd place, silver medalist(s)	Cancelled		2nd place, silver medalist(s)	Cancelled		2nd place, silver medalist(s)	Cancelled	
Baku Azerbaijan (21 Jun-02 Jul)	3rd place, bronze medalist(s)	Cancelled		3rd place, bronze medalist(s)	Cancelled		3rd place, bronze medalist(s)	Cancelled		3rd place, bronze medalist(s)	Cancelled		3rd place, bronze medalist(s)	Cancelled		3rd place, bronze medalist(s)	Cancelled	
Osijek Croatia (23 Jun-3 Jul)	1st place, gold medalist(s)	Paolo Monna; Alessio Torracchi; Federico Nilo Maldini (ITA)	16	1st place, gold medalist(s)	Vladimir Maslennikov; Sergey Kamenskiy; Alexander Dryagin (RUS)	16	1st place, gold medalist(s)			1st place, gold medalist(s)			1st place, gold medalist(s)			1st place, gold medalist(s)		
Osijek Croatia (23 Jun-3 Jul)	2nd place, silver medalist(s)	Damir Mikec; Dimitrije Grgić; Duško Petrov (SRB)	6	2nd place, silver medalist(s)	Zalan Pekler; Soma Richard Hammerl; István Péni (HUN)	8	2nd place, silver medalist(s)			2nd place, silver medalist(s)			2nd place, silver medalist(s)			2nd place, silver medalist(s)		
Osijek Croatia (23 Jun-3 Jul)	3rd place, bronze medalist(s)	Sajjad Pourhosseini; Javad Foroughi; Vahid Golkhandan (IRI)	16 BMM	3rd place, bronze medalist(s)	Milenko Sebić; Milutin Stefanović; Lazar Kovačević (SRB)	16 BMM	3rd place, bronze medalist(s)			3rd place, bronze medalist(s)			3rd place, bronze medalist(s)			3rd place, bronze medalist(s)		
Champions Cup – Baku Azerbaijan (18-24 Oct)	1st place, gold medalist(s)			1st place, gold medalist(s)			1st place, gold medalist(s)			1st place, gold medalist(s)			1st place, gold medalist(s)			1st place, gold medalist(s)		
Champions Cup – Baku Azerbaijan (18-24 Oct)	2nd place, silver medalist(s)			2nd place, silver medalist(s)			2nd place, silver medalist(s)			2nd place, silver medalist(s)			2nd place, silver medalist(s)			2nd place, silver medalist(s)		
Champions Cup – Baku Azerbaijan (18-24 Oct)	3rd place, bronze medalist(s)			3rd place, bronze medalist(s)			3rd place, bronze medalist(s)			3rd place, bronze medalist(s)			3rd place, bronze medalist(s)			3rd place, bronze medalist(s)		

== Women's results ==
=== Rifle events ===
50 metre rifle three positions			10 metre air rifle		
New Delhi India (18-29 Mar)			New Delhi India (18-29 Mar)		
1st place, gold medalist(s)	Ziva Dvorsak (SLO)	457.1	1st place, gold medalist(s)	Mary Tucker (USA)	251.5
2nd place, silver medalist(s)	Nina Christen (SUI)	455.1	2nd place, silver medalist(s)	Alison Marie Weisz (USA)	250.4
3rd place, bronze medalist(s)	Aneta Stankiewicz (POL)	443.5	3rd place, bronze medalist(s)	Eszter Denes (HUN)	230.2
Changwon South Korea			Changwon South Korea		
1st place, gold medalist(s)			1st place, gold medalist(s)		
2nd place, silver medalist(s)			2nd place, silver medalist(s)		
3rd place, bronze medalist(s)			3rd place, bronze medalist(s)		
Baku Azerbaijan (21 Jun-02 Jul)			Baku Azerbaijan (21 Jun-02 Jul)		
1st place, gold medalist(s)	Cancelled		1st place, gold medalist(s)	Cancelled	
2nd place, silver medalist(s)	Cancelled		2nd place, silver medalist(s)	Cancelled	
3rd place, bronze medalist(s)	Cancelled		3rd place, bronze medalist(s)	Cancelled	
Osijek Croatia (22 Jun – 3 Jul)			Osijek Croatia (22 Jun – 3 Jul)		
1st place, gold medalist(s)	Yulia Karimova (RUS)	464.2	1st place, gold medalist(s)	Eszter Meszaros (HUN)	250.6
2nd place, silver medalist(s)	Yulia Zykova (RUS)	461.5	2nd place, silver medalist(s)	Ziva Dvorsak (SLO)	249.8
3rd place, bronze medalist(s)	Nina Christen (SUI)	447.8	3rd place, bronze medalist(s)	Sofia Ceccarello (ITA)	226.6
Champions Cup – Baku Azerbaijan (18-24 Oct)			Champions Cup – Baku Azerbaijan (18-24 Oct)		
1st place, gold medalist(s)			1st place, gold medalist(s)		
2nd place, silver medalist(s)			2nd place, silver medalist(s)		
3rd place, bronze medalist(s)			3rd place, bronze medalist(s)		

=== Pistol events ===
25 metre pistol			10 metre air pistol		
New Delhi India (18-29 Mar)			New Delhi India (18-29 Mar)		
1st place, gold medalist(s)	Chinki Yadav (IND)	32 S-off 4	1st place, gold medalist(s)	Yashaswini Singh Deswal (IND)	238.8
2nd place, silver medalist(s)	Rahi Sarnobat (IND)	32 S-off 3	2nd place, silver medalist(s)	Manu Bhaker (IND)	236.7
3rd place, bronze medalist(s)	Manu Bhaker (IND)	28	3rd place, bronze medalist(s)	Viktoria Chaika (BLR)	215.9
Changwon South Korea			Changwon South Korea		
1st place, gold medalist(s)			1st place, gold medalist(s)		
2nd place, silver medalist(s)			2nd place, silver medalist(s)		
3rd place, bronze medalist(s)			3rd place, bronze medalist(s)		
Baku Azerbaijan (21 Jun-02 Jul)			Baku Azerbaijan (21 Jun-02 Jul)		
1st place, gold medalist(s)	Cancelled		1st place, gold medalist(s)	Cancelled	
2nd place, silver medalist(s)	Cancelled		2nd place, silver medalist(s)	Cancelled	
3rd place, bronze medalist(s)	Cancelled		3rd place, bronze medalist(s)	Cancelled	
Osijek Croatia (22 Jun – 3 Jul)			Osijek Croatia (22 Jun – 3 Jul)		
1st place, gold medalist(s)	Rahi Sarnobat (IND)	39	1st place, gold medalist(s)	Antoaneta Kostadinova (BUL)	240.0
2nd place, silver medalist(s)	Mathilde Lamolle (FRA)	31	2nd place, silver medalist(s)	Carina Wimmer (GER)	237.5
3rd place, bronze medalist(s)	Vitalina Batsarashkina (RUS)	28	3rd place, bronze medalist(s)	Yulia Korostylova (UKR)	216.8
Champions Cup – Baku Azerbaijan (18-24 Oct)			Champions Cup – Baku Azerbaijan (18-24 Oct)		
1st place, gold medalist(s)			1st place, gold medalist(s)		
2nd place, silver medalist(s)			2nd place, silver medalist(s)		
3rd place, bronze medalist(s)			3rd place, bronze medalist(s)		

=== Shotgun events ===
Trap			Skeet		
Cairo Egypt (22 Feb-5 Mar)			Cairo Egypt (22 Feb-5 Mar)		
1st place, gold medalist(s)	Fátima Gálvez (ESP)	44 S-off: 5	1st place, gold medalist(s)	Danka Barteková (SVK)	55
2nd place, silver medalist(s)	Daria Semianova (RUS)	44 S-off: 4	2nd place, silver medalist(s)	Alina Fazylzyanova (RUS)	53
3rd place, bronze medalist(s)	Ekaterina Subbotina (RUS)	33	3rd place, bronze medalist(s)	Konstantia Nikolaou (CYP)	43
New Delhi India (18-29 Mar)			New Delhi India (18-29 Mar)		
1st place, gold medalist(s)	Zuzana Rehák-Štefečeková (SVK)	42 S-off: 5	1st place, gold medalist(s)	Amber Hill (GBR)	51 S-off: 4
2nd place, silver medalist(s)	Sandra Bernal (POL)	42 S-off: 4	2nd place, silver medalist(s)	Zoya Kravchenko (KAZ)	51 S-off: 3
3rd place, bronze medalist(s)	Fiammetta Rossi (ITA)	32	3rd place, bronze medalist(s)	Ganemat Sekhon (IND)	40
Changwon South Korea			Changwon South Korea		
1st place, gold medalist(s)			1st place, gold medalist(s)		
2nd place, silver medalist(s)			2nd place, silver medalist(s)		
3rd place, bronze medalist(s)			3rd place, bronze medalist(s)		
Lonato Italy (7-17 May)			Lonato Italy (7-17 May)		
1st place, gold medalist(s)	Alessandra Perilli (SMR)	42 S-off: 2	1st place, gold medalist(s)	Austen Smith (USA)	55
2nd place, silver medalist(s)	Madelynn Ann Bernau (USA)	42 S-off: 1	2nd place, silver medalist(s)	Amber Hill (GBR)	52
3rd place, bronze medalist(s)	Fátima Gálvez (ESP)	33	3rd place, bronze medalist(s)	Danka Barteková (SVK)	43
Baku Azerbaijan (21 Jun-02 Jul)			Baku Azerbaijan (21 Jun-02 Jul)		
1st place, gold medalist(s)	Cancelled		1st place, gold medalist(s)	Cancelled	
2nd place, silver medalist(s)	Cancelled		2nd place, silver medalist(s)	Cancelled	
3rd place, bronze medalist(s)	Cancelled		3rd place, bronze medalist(s)	Cancelled	
Osijek Croatia (22 Jun – 3 Jul)			Osijek Croatia (22 Jun – 3 Jul)		
1st place, gold medalist(s)	Silvana Stanco (ITA)	46	1st place, gold medalist(s)	Zila Batyrshina (RUS)	56
2nd place, silver medalist(s)	Jessica Rossi (ITA)	44	2nd place, silver medalist(s)	Francisca Crovetto (CHI)	53
3rd place, bronze medalist(s)	Jana Špotáková (SVK)	33	3rd place, bronze medalist(s)	Victoria Larsson (SWE)	42
Champions Cup – Baku Azerbaijan (18-24 Oct)			Champions Cup – Baku Azerbaijan (18-24 Oct)		
1st place, gold medalist(s)			1st place, gold medalist(s)		
2nd place, silver medalist(s)			2nd place, silver medalist(s)		
3rd place, bronze medalist(s)			3rd place, bronze medalist(s)		

=== Team Results ===
	10 metre air pistol			10 metre air rifle			25 metre pistol			50 metre rifle three positions			Skeet			Trap		
Cairo Egypt (22 Feb-5 Mar)	No Rifle/Pistol events												1st place, gold medalist(s)	Natalia Vinogradova; Zilia Batyrshina; Alina Fazylzyanova (RUS)	6	1st place, gold medalist(s)	Daria Semianova; Ekaterina Subbotina; Luliia Saveleva (RUS)	6
Cairo Egypt (22 Feb-5 Mar)	No Rifle/Pistol events												2nd place, silver medalist(s)	Anna Sindelarova; Barbora Sumova; Martina Skalicka (CZE)	2	2nd place, silver medalist(s)	Kirti Gupta; Rajeshwari Kumari; Manisha Keer (IND)	4
Cairo Egypt (22 Feb-5 Mar)	No Rifle/Pistol events												3rd place, bronze medalist(s)	Zoya Kravchenko; Nirata Nassryrova; Olga Panarina (KAZ)	6 BMM	3rd place, bronze medalist(s)	Maria Dmitriyenko; Aizhan Dosmagambetova; Sarsenkul Rysbekova (KAZ)	6 BMM
New Delhi India (18-29 Mar)	1st place, gold medalist(s)	Yashaswini Singh Deswal; Manu Bhaker; Shri Nivetha Paramanantham (IND)	16	1st place, gold medalist(s)	Rikke Maeng Ibsen; Stine Nielsen; Anna Nielsen (DEN)	16	1st place, gold medalist(s)	Rahi Sarnobat; Manu Bhaker; Chinki Yadav (IND)	17	1st place, gold medalist(s)	Natalia Kochanska; Aneta Stankeiwicz; Aleksandra Szutko (POL)	47	1st place, gold medalist(s)	Zoya Kravchenko; Nirata Nassryrova; Olga Panarina (KAZ)	6	1st place, gold medalist(s)	Rajeshwari Kumari; Shreyasi Singh; Manisha Keer (IND)	6
New Delhi India (18-29 Mar)	2nd place, silver medalist(s)	Jurita Borek; Joanna Iwona Wawrzonowska; Agnieszka Korezwo (POL)	8	2nd place, silver medalist(s)	Sagen Maddalena; Mary Tucker; Elison Marie Weisz (USA)	8	2nd place, silver medalist(s)	Jurita Borek; Joanna Iwona Wawrzonowska; Agnieszka Korezwo (POL)	7	2nd place, silver medalist(s)	Anjum Moudgil; Shreya Saksena; Gaayathri Nithyanandam (IND)	43	2nd place, silver medalist(s)	Parinaaz Dhaliwal; Kartiki Singh Shaktawat; Ganemat Sekhon (IND)	4	2nd place, silver medalist(s)	Maria Dmitriyenko; Aizhan Dosmagambetova; Sarsenkul Rysbekova (KAZ)	0
New Delhi India (18-29 Mar)	3rd place, bronze medalist(s)	No Bronze Medal Match		3rd place, bronze medalist(s)	Natalia Kochanska; Aneta Stankeiwicz; Aleksandra Szutko (POL)	17 BMM	3rd place, bronze medalist(s)	No Bronze Medal Match		3rd place, bronze medalist(s)	Vidya Rafika Toyyiba; Monica Daryanti; Audrey Zahra Dhiyanissa (INA)	47 BMM	3rd place, bronze medalist(s)	No Bronze Medal Match		3rd place, bronze medalist(s)	No Bronze Medal Match	
Changwon South Korea	1st place, gold medalist(s)			1st place, gold medalist(s)			1st place, gold medalist(s)			1st place, gold medalist(s)			1st place, gold medalist(s)			1st place, gold medalist(s)		
Changwon South Korea	2nd place, silver medalist(s)			2nd place, silver medalist(s)			2nd place, silver medalist(s)			2nd place, silver medalist(s)			2nd place, silver medalist(s)			2nd place, silver medalist(s)		
Changwon South Korea	3rd place, bronze medalist(s)			3rd place, bronze medalist(s)			3rd place, bronze medalist(s)			3rd place, bronze medalist(s)			3rd place, bronze medalist(s)			3rd place, bronze medalist(s)		
Lonato Italy (7-17 May)	No Rifle/Pistol events												1st place, gold medalist(s)	Diana Bacosi; Chiara Cainero; Chiara Di Marziantonio (ITA)	6	1st place, gold medalist(s)	Cristina Beltran; Fátima Gálvez; Mar Molné Magriñà (ESP)	6
Lonato Italy (7-17 May)	No Rifle/Pistol events												2nd place, silver medalist(s)	Amber English; Austen Jewell Smith; Samantha Simonton (USA)	4	2nd place, silver medalist(s)	Gaia Ragazzini; Jessica Rossi; Silvana Stanco (ITA)	0
Lonato Italy (7-17 May)	No Rifle/Pistol events												3rd place, bronze medalist(s)	Lucia Kopcanova; Veronika Sykorova; Danka Barteková (SVK)	6 BMM	3rd place, bronze medalist(s)	Rachel Tozier; Kayle Browning; Madelynn Ann Bernau (USA)	6 BMM
Baku Azerbaijan (21 Jun-02 Jul)	1st place, gold medalist(s)	Cancelled		1st place, gold medalist(s)	Cancelled		1st place, gold medalist(s)	Cancelled		1st place, gold medalist(s)	Cancelled		1st place, gold medalist(s)	Cancelled		1st place, gold medalist(s)	Cancelled	
Baku Azerbaijan (21 Jun-02 Jul)	2nd place, silver medalist(s)	Cancelled		2nd place, silver medalist(s)	Cancelled		2nd place, silver medalist(s)	Cancelled		2nd place, silver medalist(s)	Cancelled		2nd place, silver medalist(s)	Cancelled		2nd place, silver medalist(s)	Cancelled	
Baku Azerbaijan (21 Jun-02 Jul)	3rd place, bronze medalist(s)	Cancelled		3rd place, bronze medalist(s)	Cancelled		3rd place, bronze medalist(s)	Cancelled		3rd place, bronze medalist(s)	Cancelled		3rd place, bronze medalist(s)	Cancelled		3rd place, bronze medalist(s)	Cancelled	
Osijek Croatia (23 Jun-3 Jul)	1st place, gold medalist(s)			1st place, gold medalist(s)	Najmeh Khedmati; Fatemeh Karamzadeh; Armina Sadeghian (IRI)		1st place, gold medalist(s)			1st place, gold medalist(s)			1st place, gold medalist(s)			1st place, gold medalist(s)		
Osijek Croatia (23 Jun-3 Jul)	2nd place, silver medalist(s)			2nd place, silver medalist(s)	Anastasiia Galashina; Yulia Karimova; Daria Boldinova (RUS)		2nd place, silver medalist(s)			2nd place, silver medalist(s)			2nd place, silver medalist(s)			2nd place, silver medalist(s)		
Osijek Croatia (23 Jun-3 Jul)	3rd place, bronze medalist(s)			3rd place, bronze medalist(s)	Lea Horvath; Eszter Denes; Eszter Meszaros (HUN)		3rd place, bronze medalist(s)			3rd place, bronze medalist(s)			3rd place, bronze medalist(s)			3rd place, bronze medalist(s)		
Champions Cup – Baku Azerbaijan (18-24 Oct)	1st place, gold medalist(s)			1st place, gold medalist(s)			1st place, gold medalist(s)			1st place, gold medalist(s)			1st place, gold medalist(s)			1st place, gold medalist(s)		
Champions Cup – Baku Azerbaijan (18-24 Oct)	2nd place, silver medalist(s)			2nd place, silver medalist(s)			2nd place, silver medalist(s)			2nd place, silver medalist(s)			2nd place, silver medalist(s)			2nd place, silver medalist(s)		
Champions Cup – Baku Azerbaijan (18-24 Oct)	3rd place, bronze medalist(s)			3rd place, bronze medalist(s)			3rd place, bronze medalist(s)			3rd place, bronze medalist(s)			3rd place, bronze medalist(s)			3rd place, bronze medalist(s)		

== Mixed team results ==
	10 metre air pistol			10 metre air rifle			25 metre rapid fire pistol			50 metre rifle three positions			Trap			Skeet		
Acapulco Egypt (22 Feb-5 Mar)	No Rifle/Pistol events												1st place, gold medalist(s)	Alexy Alipov/Daria Semianova (RUS)	41	1st place, gold medalist(s)	Alexander Zemlin/Alina Fazylyanova (RUS)	35
Acapulco Egypt (22 Feb-5 Mar)	No Rifle/Pistol events												2nd place, silver medalist(s)	Ahmed Zaher/Maggy Ashmawy (EGY)	34	2nd place, silver medalist(s)	Jakub Warys/Aleksandra Jarmolinska (POL)	31
Acapulco Egypt (22 Feb-5 Mar)	No Rifle/Pistol events												3rd place, bronze medalist(s)	Alberto Fernandez/Fatima Galvez (ESP)	45	3rd place, bronze medalist(s)	Anna Sindelarova/Tomas Nydrle (CZE)	32
New Delhi India (18-29 Mar)	1st place, gold medalist(s)	Saurabh Chaudhary/Manu Bhaker (IND)	16	1st place, gold medalist(s)	Divyansh Singh Panwar/Elavenil Valarivan (IND)	16	1st place, gold medalist(s)	Tejaswini/Vijayveer Sidhu (IND)	9	1st place, gold medalist(s)	Sanjeev Rajput/Tejaswini Sawant (IND)	31	1st place, gold medalist(s)	Angad Vir Singh Bajwa/Ganemat Sekhon (IND)	33	1st place, gold medalist(s)	Valerio Grazini/Alessia Iezzi (ITA)	39
New Delhi India (18-29 Mar)	2nd place, silver medalist(s)	Javad Foroughi/Golnoush Sebghatollahi (IRI)	12	2nd place, silver medalist(s)	Istvan Peni/Eszter Denes (HUN)	10	2nd place, silver medalist(s)	Abhidnya Ashok Patil/Gurpreet Singh (IND)	1	2nd place, silver medalist(s)	Serhiy Kulish/Anna Ilina (UKR)	29	2nd place, silver medalist(s)	Alexendr Yechshenko/Olga Panarina (KAZ)	29	2nd place, silver medalist(s)	Adrian Drobny/Zuzana Rehak Stefecekova (SVK)	36
New Delhi India (18-29 Mar)	3rd place, bronze medalist(s)	Abhishek Verma/Yashaswini Singh Deswal (IND)	17 BMM	3rd place, bronze medalist(s)	Mary Tucker/Lucas Kozeniesky (USA)	17 BMM	3rd place, bronze medalist(s)	No Bronze medal match		3rd place, bronze medalist(s)	Aishwary Pratap Singh Tomar/Sunidhi Chauhan (IND)	31 BMM	3rd place, bronze medalist(s)	Rashid Hamad/Reem Al Sharshani (QAT)	32	3rd place, bronze medalist(s)	Yavuz İlnam/Safiye Sariturk (TUR)	38 BMM
Changwon South Korea	1st place, gold medalist(s)			1st place, gold medalist(s)			1st place, gold medalist(s)			1st place, gold medalist(s)			1st place, gold medalist(s)			1st place, gold medalist(s)		
Changwon South Korea	2nd place, silver medalist(s)			2nd place, silver medalist(s)			2nd place, silver medalist(s)			2nd place, silver medalist(s)			2nd place, silver medalist(s)			2nd place, silver medalist(s)		
Changwon South Korea	3rd place, bronze medalist(s)			3rd place, bronze medalist(s)			3rd place, bronze medalist(s)			3rd place, bronze medalist(s)			3rd place, bronze medalist(s)			3rd place, bronze medalist(s)		
Lonato Italy (7-17 May)	No Rifle/Pistol events												1st place, gold medalist(s)	Matthew Coward-Holley/Kirsty Hegarty (GBR)	39	1st place, gold medalist(s)	Vincent Hancock/Amber English (USA)	36
Lonato Italy (7-17 May)	No Rifle/Pistol events												2nd place, silver medalist(s)	Gian Marco Berti/Alessandra Perilli (SMR)	34	2nd place, silver medalist(s)	Chiara Cainero/Tammaro Cassandro (ITA)	34
Lonato Italy (7-17 May)	No Rifle/Pistol events												3rd place, bronze medalist(s)	Alberto Fernandez/Fatima Galvez (ESP)	46	3rd place, bronze medalist(s)	Phillip Russell Jungman/Austen Jewell Smith (USA)	36
Baku Azerbaijan (21 Jun-02 Jul)	1st place, gold medalist(s)	Cancelled		1st place, gold medalist(s)	Cancelled		1st place, gold medalist(s)	Cancelled		1st place, gold medalist(s)	Cancelled		1st place, gold medalist(s)	Cancelled		1st place, gold medalist(s)	Cancelled	
Baku Azerbaijan (21 Jun-02 Jul)	2nd place, silver medalist(s)	Cancelled		2nd place, silver medalist(s)	Cancelled		2nd place, silver medalist(s)	Cancelled		2nd place, silver medalist(s)	Cancelled		2nd place, silver medalist(s)	Cancelled		2nd place, silver medalist(s)	Cancelled	
Baku Azerbaijan (21 Jun-02 Jul)	3rd place, bronze medalist(s)	Cancelled		3rd place, bronze medalist(s)	Cancelled		3rd place, bronze medalist(s)	Cancelled		3rd place, bronze medalist(s)	Cancelled		3rd place, bronze medalist(s)	Cancelled		3rd place, bronze medalist(s)	Cancelled	
Osijek Croatia (23 Jun-3 Jul)	1st place, gold medalist(s)	Vitalina Batsarashkina/Artem Chernousov (RUS)	16	1st place, gold medalist(s)	Eszter Meszaros/Istvan Peni (HUN)	17	1st place, gold medalist(s)	Sandra Reitz/Christian Reitz (GER)	9	1st place, gold medalist(s)	Natalia Kochanska/Maciej Kowalewicz (POL)	33	1st place, gold medalist(s)	Jessica Rossi/Mauro De Filippis (ITA)	40	1st place, gold medalist(s)	Francisca Crovetto Chadid/Hector Andrés Flores Barahona (CHI)	35
Osijek Croatia (23 Jun-3 Jul)	2nd place, silver medalist(s)	Manu Bhaker/Saurabh Chaudhary (IND)	12	2nd place, silver medalist(s)	Yulia Karimova/Sergey Kamenskiy (RUS)	13	2nd place, silver medalist(s)	Svetlana Medvedeva/Leonid Ekimov (RUS)	1	2nd place, silver medalist(s)	Snjezana Pejcic/Petar Gorsa (CRO)	19	2nd place, silver medalist(s)	Daria Semianova/Alexey Alipov (RUS)	39	2nd place, silver medalist(s)	Iryna Malovichko/Mikola Milchev (UKR)	34
Osijek Croatia (23 Jun-3 Jul)	3rd place, bronze medalist(s)	Golnoush Sebghatollahi/Javad Foroughi (IRI)	17 BMM	3rd place, bronze medalist(s)	Anastasiia Galashina/Vladimir Maslennikov (RUS)	17 BMM	3rd place, bronze medalist(s)	Doreen Vennekamp/Oliver Geis (GER)	10 BMM	3rd place, bronze medalist(s)	Maria Martynova/Yury Shcherbatsevich (BLR)	31 BMM	3rd place, bronze medalist(s)	Bettina Valdorf/Paul Pigorsch (GER)	39 BMM	3rd place, bronze medalist(s)	Diana Bacosi/Gabriele Rossetti (ITA)	36 BMM
Champions Cup – Baku Azerbaijan (18-24 Oct)	1st place, gold medalist(s)			1st place, gold medalist(s)			1st place, gold medalist(s)			1st place, gold medalist(s)			1st place, gold medalist(s)			1st place, gold medalist(s)		
Champions Cup – Baku Azerbaijan (18-24 Oct)	2nd place, silver medalist(s)			2nd place, silver medalist(s)			2nd place, silver medalist(s)			2nd place, silver medalist(s)			2nd place, silver medalist(s)			2nd place, silver medalist(s)		
Champions Cup – Baku Azerbaijan (18-24 Oct)	3rd place, bronze medalist(s)			3rd place, bronze medalist(s)			3rd place, bronze medalist(s)			3rd place, bronze medalist(s)			3rd place, bronze medalist(s)			3rd place, bronze medalist(s)		

BMM – Bronze Medal Match

S-off – Shoot off

== Medal table ==
Combined Medal Tally after ISSF World Cup (Shotgun), Cairo, Egypt and ISSF World Cup (Rifle/ Pistol/Shotgun), New Delhi, India and ISSF World Cup (Shotgun), Lonato, Italy.

Rank	Nation	Gold	Silver	Bronze	Total
1	India (IND)	16	10	8	34
2	United States (USA)	7	6	3	16
3	Russia (RUS)	6	7	1	14
4	Italy (ITA)	6	2	3	11
5	Iran (IRI)	3	1	1	5
6	Spain (ESP)	2	2	4	8
7	Slovakia (SVK)	2	2	3	7
8	Denmark (DEN)	2	2	1	5
9	Great Britain (GBR)	2	1	0	3
9	Ukraine (UKR)	2	1	0	3
11	Croatia (CRO)	2	0	2	4
12	Poland (POL)	1	4	3	8
13	Kazakhstan (KAZ)	1	3	4	8
14	Egypt (EGY)	1	1	2	4
15	San Marino (SMR)	1	1	0	2
16	France (FRA)	1	0	1	2
17	Estonia (EST)	1	0	0	1
17	Kuwait (KUW)	1	0	0	1
17	Slovenia (SLO)	1	0	0	1
20	Hungary (HUN)	0	4	1	5
21	Czech Republic (CZE)	0	2	1	3
21	Serbia (SRB)	0	2	1	3
23	Qatar (QAT)	0	1	3	4
24	Argentina (ARG)	0	1	0	1
24	Switzerland (SUI)	0	1	0	1
24	United Arab Emirates (UAE)	0	1	0	1
24	Vietnam (VIE)	0	1	0	1
28	Cyprus (CYP)	0	0	2	2
29	Belarus (BLR)	0	0	1	1
29	Indonesia (INA)	0	0	1	1
29	South Korea (KOR)	0	0	1	1
29	Turkey (TUR)	0	0	1	1
Totals (32 entries)		58	56	48	162
