= 2020 ISSF World Cup =

- Sport: Shooting
- Hosts: (Cyprus) Nicosia (India) New Delhi (Germany) Munich (Azerbaijan) Baku
- Duration: 4 March – 9 June

Seasons
- ← 2019 2021 →

The 2020 ISSF World Cup is the annual edition of the ISSF World Cup in the Olympic shooting events, governed by the International Shooting Sport Federation.

Due to the COVID-19 pandemic, the only stage that went ahead as planned was the first stage of the shotgun world cup in Nicosia, Cyprus.

== Men's results ==
=== Rifle events ===
50 metre rifle three positions		10 metre air rifle	
New Delhi India (05-13 May)		New Delhi India (05-13 May)	
1st place, gold medalist(s)	Cancelled	1st place, gold medalist(s)	Cancelled
2nd place, silver medalist(s)	Cancelled	2nd place, silver medalist(s)	Cancelled
3rd place, bronze medalist(s)	Cancelled	3rd place, bronze medalist(s)	Cancelled
Munich Germany (02-09 Jun)		Munich Germany (02-09 Jun)	
1st place, gold medalist(s)	Cancelled	1st place, gold medalist(s)	Cancelled
2nd place, silver medalist(s)	Cancelled	2nd place, silver medalist(s)	Cancelled
3rd place, bronze medalist(s)	Cancelled	3rd place, bronze medalist(s)	Cancelled
Baku Azerbaijan (22 Jun-03 Jul)		Baku Azerbaijan (22 Jun-03 Jul)	
1st place, gold medalist(s)	Cancelled	1st place, gold medalist(s)	Cancelled
2nd place, silver medalist(s)	Cancelled	2nd place, silver medalist(s)	Cancelled
3rd place, bronze medalist(s)	Cancelled	3rd place, bronze medalist(s)	Cancelled

=== Pistol events ===
25 metre rapid fire pistol		10 metre air pistol	
New Delhi India (05-13 May)		New Delhi India (05-13 May)	
1st place, gold medalist(s)	Cancelled	1st place, gold medalist(s)	Cancelled
2nd place, silver medalist(s)	Cancelled	2nd place, silver medalist(s)	Cancelled
3rd place, bronze medalist(s)	Cancelled	3rd place, bronze medalist(s)	Cancelled
Munich Germany (02-09 Jun)		Munich Germany (02-09 Jun)	
1st place, gold medalist(s)	Cancelled	1st place, gold medalist(s)	Cancelled
2nd place, silver medalist(s)	Cancelled	2nd place, silver medalist(s)	Cancelled
3rd place, bronze medalist(s)	Cancelled	3rd place, bronze medalist(s)	Cancelled
Baku Azerbaijan (22 Jun-03 Jul)		Baku Azerbaijan (22 Jun-03 Jul)	
1st place, gold medalist(s)	Cancelled	1st place, gold medalist(s)	Cancelled
2nd place, silver medalist(s)	Cancelled	2nd place, silver medalist(s)	Cancelled
3rd place, bronze medalist(s)	Cancelled	3rd place, bronze medalist(s)	Cancelled

=== Shotgun events ===
Trap			Skeet		
Nicosia Cyprus (04-13 Mar)			Nicosia Cyprus (04-13 Mar)		
1st place, gold medalist(s)	Anton Glasnovic (CRO)	44	1st place, gold medalist(s)	Stefan Nilsson (SWE)	58
2nd place, silver medalist(s)	Andreas Löw (GER)	41	2nd place, silver medalist(s)	Federico Gil (ARG)	57
3rd place, bronze medalist(s)	Matthew Coward-Holley (GBR)	32	3rd place, bronze medalist(s)	Azmy Mehelba (EGY)	47
New Delhi India (20-29 May)			New Delhi India (20-29 May)		
1st place, gold medalist(s)	Cancelled		1st place, gold medalist(s)	Cancelled	
2nd place, silver medalist(s)	Cancelled		2nd place, silver medalist(s)	Cancelled	
3rd place, bronze medalist(s)	Cancelled		3rd place, bronze medalist(s)	Cancelled	
Baku Azerbaijan (22 Jun-03 Jul)			Baku Azerbaijan (22 Jun-03 Jul)		
1st place, gold medalist(s)	Cancelled		1st place, gold medalist(s)	Cancelled	
2nd place, silver medalist(s)	Cancelled		2nd place, silver medalist(s)	Cancelled	
3rd place, bronze medalist(s)	Cancelled		3rd place, bronze medalist(s)	Cancelled	

== Women's results ==
=== Rifle events ===
50 metre rifle three positions		10 metre air rifle	
New Delhi India (05-13 May)		New Delhi India (05-13 May)	
1st place, gold medalist(s)	Cancelled	1st place, gold medalist(s)	Cancelled
2nd place, silver medalist(s)	Cancelled	2nd place, silver medalist(s)	Cancelled
3rd place, bronze medalist(s)	Cancelled	3rd place, bronze medalist(s)	Cancelled
Munich Germany (02-09 Jun)		Munich Germany (02-09 Jun)	
1st place, gold medalist(s)	Cancelled	1st place, gold medalist(s)	Cancelled
2nd place, silver medalist(s)	Cancelled	2nd place, silver medalist(s)	Cancelled
3rd place, bronze medalist(s)	Cancelled	3rd place, bronze medalist(s)	Cancelled
Baku Azerbaijan (22 Jun-03 Jul)		Baku Azerbaijan (22 Jun-03 Jul)	
1st place, gold medalist(s)	Cancelled	1st place, gold medalist(s)	Cancelled
2nd place, silver medalist(s)	Cancelled	2nd place, silver medalist(s)	Cancelled
3rd place, bronze medalist(s)	Cancelled	3rd place, bronze medalist(s)	Cancelled

=== Pistol events ===
25 metre pistol		10 metre air pistol	
New Delhi India (05-13 May)		New Delhi India (05-13 May)	
1st place, gold medalist(s)	Cancelled	1st place, gold medalist(s)	Cancelled
2nd place, silver medalist(s)	Cancelled	2nd place, silver medalist(s)	Cancelled
3rd place, bronze medalist(s)	Cancelled	3rd place, bronze medalist(s)	Cancelled
Munich Germany (02-09 Jun)		Munich Germany (02-09 Jun)	
1st place, gold medalist(s)	Cancelled	1st place, gold medalist(s)	Cancelled
2nd place, silver medalist(s)	Cancelled	2nd place, silver medalist(s)	Cancelled
3rd place, bronze medalist(s)	Cancelled	3rd place, bronze medalist(s)	Cancelled
Baku Azerbaijan (22 Jun-03 Jul)		Baku Azerbaijan (22 Jun-03 Jul)	
1st place, gold medalist(s)	Cancelled	1st place, gold medalist(s)	Cancelled
2nd place, silver medalist(s)	Cancelled	2nd place, silver medalist(s)	Cancelled
3rd place, bronze medalist(s)	Cancelled	3rd place, bronze medalist(s)	Cancelled

=== Shotgun events ===
Trap			Skeet		
Nicosia Cyprus (04-13 Mar)			Nicosia Cyprus (04-13 Mar)		
1st place, gold medalist(s)	Sandra Bernal (POL)	44	1st place, gold medalist(s)	Nadine Messerschmidt (GER)	52
2nd place, silver medalist(s)	Alessandra Perilli (SMR)	43	2nd place, silver medalist(s)	Sutiya Jiewchaloemmit (THA)	49
3rd place, bronze medalist(s)	Fátima Gálvez (ITA)	32	3rd place, bronze medalist(s)	Danka Barteková (SVK)	42
New Delhi India (20-29 May)			New Delhi India (20-29 May)		
1st place, gold medalist(s)	Cancelled		1st place, gold medalist(s)	Cancelled	
2nd place, silver medalist(s)	Cancelled		2nd place, silver medalist(s)	Cancelled	
3rd place, bronze medalist(s)	Cancelled		3rd place, bronze medalist(s)	Cancelled	
Baku Azerbaijan (22 Jun-03 Jul)			Baku Azerbaijan (22 Jun-03 Jul)		
1st place, gold medalist(s)	Cancelled		1st place, gold medalist(s)	Cancelled	
2nd place, silver medalist(s)	Cancelled		2nd place, silver medalist(s)	Cancelled	
3rd place, bronze medalist(s)	Cancelled		3rd place, bronze medalist(s)	Cancelled	

== Mixed Team Results ==
	10 metre air pistol		10 metre air rifle		Trap			Skeet		
Nicosia Cyprus (20-28 Feb)	No Rifle/Pistol events				1st place, gold medalist(s)	Carole Cormenier/Antonin Desert (FRA)	43	1st place, gold medalist(s)	Natalia Vinogradova/Roman Sentcov (RUS) 2	36
Nicosia Cyprus (20-28 Feb)	No Rifle/Pistol events				2nd place, silver medalist(s)	Fátima Gálvez/Alberto Fernandez (ESP)	37	2nd place, silver medalist(s)	Nele Wissmer/Felix Haase (GER)	34
Nicosia Cyprus (20-28 Feb)	No Rifle/Pistol events				3rd place, bronze medalist(s)	Safiye Sariturk/Yavuz Ilnam (TUR)	41 in BMM	3rd place, bronze medalist(s)	Zilia Batyrshina/Anton Astakhov (RUS) 1	36 in BMM
New Delhi India (05-13 May)	1st place, gold medalist(s)	Cancelled	1st place, gold medalist(s)	Cancelled	No Shotgun events					
New Delhi India (05-13 May)	2nd place, silver medalist(s)	Cancelled	2nd place, silver medalist(s)	Cancelled	No Shotgun events					
New Delhi India (05-13 May)	3rd place, bronze medalist(s)	Cancelled	3rd place, bronze medalist(s)	Cancelled	No Shotgun events					
New Delhi India (20-29 May)	No Rifle/Pistol events				1st place, gold medalist(s)	Cancelled		1st place, gold medalist(s)	Cancelled	
New Delhi India (20-29 May)	No Rifle/Pistol events				2nd place, silver medalist(s)	Cancelled		2nd place, silver medalist(s)	Cancelled	
New Delhi India (20-29 May)	No Rifle/Pistol events				3rd place, bronze medalist(s)	Cancelled		3rd place, bronze medalist(s)	Cancelled	
Munich Germany (02-09 Jun)	1st place, gold medalist(s)	Cancelled	1st place, gold medalist(s)	Cancelled	No Shotgun events					
Munich Germany (02-09 Jun)	2nd place, silver medalist(s)	Cancelled	2nd place, silver medalist(s)	Cancelled	No Shotgun events					
Munich Germany (02-09 Jun)	3rd place, bronze medalist(s)	Cancelled	3rd place, bronze medalist(s)	Cancelled	No Shotgun events					
Baku Azerbaijan (22 Jun-03 Jul)	1st place, gold medalist(s)	Cancelled	1st place, gold medalist(s)	Cancelled	1st place, gold medalist(s)	Cancelled		1st place, gold medalist(s)	Cancelled	
Baku Azerbaijan (22 Jun-03 Jul)	2nd place, silver medalist(s)	Cancelled	2nd place, silver medalist(s)	Cancelled	2nd place, silver medalist(s)	Cancelled		2nd place, silver medalist(s)	Cancelled	
Baku Azerbaijan (22 Jun-03 Jul)	3rd place, bronze medalist(s)	Cancelled	3rd place, bronze medalist(s)	Cancelled	3rd place, bronze medalist(s)	Cancelled		3rd place, bronze medalist(s)	Cancelled	

(BMM- Bronze-medal match)

== Overall Medal Table ==
- Only includes medals from world cup shotgun, Nicosia (13/03/20)

Rank	Nation	Gold	Silver	Bronze	Total
1	Germany (GER)	1	2	0	3
2	Russia (RUS)	1	0	1	2
3	Croatia (CRO)	1	0	0	1
3	France (FRA)	1	0	0	1
3	Poland (POL)	1	0	0	1
3	Sweden (SWE)	1	0	0	1
7	Spain (ESP)	0	1	1	2
8	Argentina (ARG)	0	1	0	1
8	San Marino (SMR)	0	1	0	1
8	Thailand (THA)	0	1	0	1
11	Egypt (EGY)	0	0	1	1
11	Great Britain (GBR)	0	0	1	1
11	Slovakia (SVK)	0	0	1	1
11	Turkey (TUR)	0	0	1	1
Totals (14 entries)		6	6	6	18
