= Tej (disambiguation) =

Tej is an Ethiopian mead or honey wine.

Tej or TEJ may also refer to:

- TEJ - short for Tropical Easterly Jet
- Panchakanya Tej (TEJ), franchise team in the Nepal Premier League
- Tej Bahadur Sapru (1875–1949), lawyer and political leader
- Ram Charan Tej, Indian film actor
- Tej Parker, a character from The Fast and the Furious film series
- The Hungarian word for milk (Tej)
- Cyclone Tej, a 2023 tropical storm primarily affecting Yemen
- Tejaswini, Indian feminine given name
