= Carina Wimmer =

German sport shooter (born 1995)

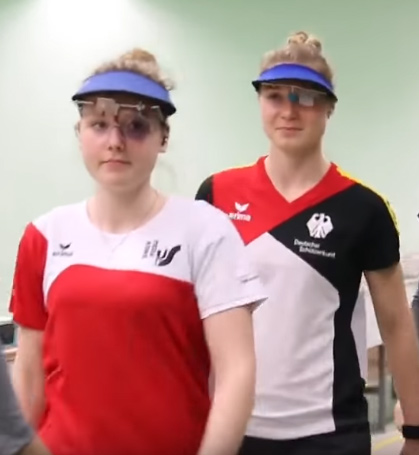
- Carina Wimmer (right), in FISU World Shooting Sport Championship, 2018

Personal information
- National team: Germany
- Born: August 27, 1995 (age 30) Mühldorf, Bavaria, Germany
- Education: Technical University of Munich

Sport
- Sport: Sport shooting
- Event: Pistol

Achievements and titles
- Olympic finals: 2020 Summer Olympics
Medal record
Representing Germany
European Shooting Championships
Pistol shooting
Gold medal – first place	2021 Osijek	10 m air pistol
Gold medal – first place	2021 Osijek	25 metre pistol team
ISSF World Cup
Pistol shooting
Silver medal – second place	2021 Osijek	10 metre air pistol
Silver medal – second place	2021 Osijek	Women's air pistol team

Carina Wimmer (born 27 August 1995 in Mühldorf, Bavaria) is a German pistol sport shooter. She will compete for Germany at the 2020 Summer Olympics, participating in the women's 10 metre air pistol and the mixed 10 metre air pistol team events.

== Biography ==
Carina Wimmer was born on 27 August 1995 in Mühldorf, Bavaria. She began sport shooting at the age of 10 with her sister. Wimmer is currently a student at the Technical University of Munich pursuing a Master of Health Science after receiving her bachelor's degree in health science.

== Career ==
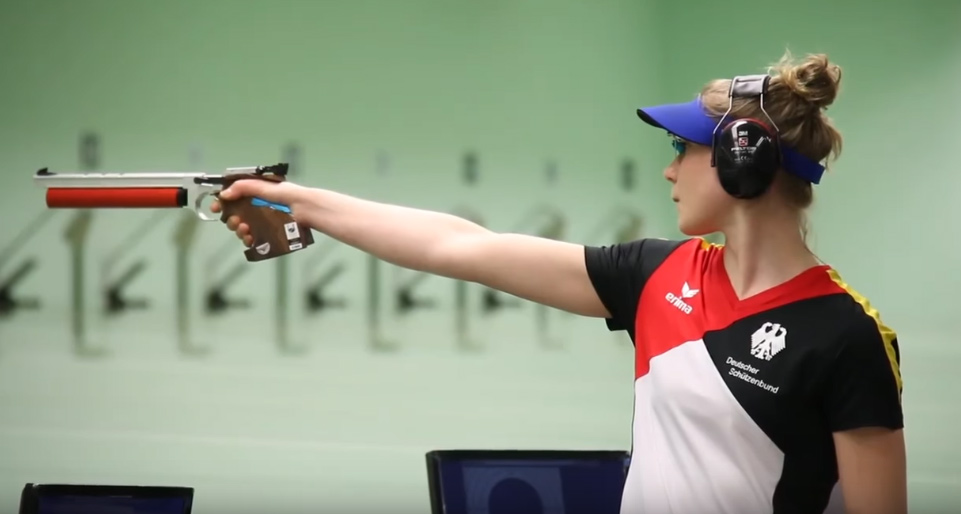
Carina Wimmer, in FISU World Shooting Sport Championship, 2018

=== 2021 European Shooting Championships ===
At the 2021 European Shooting Championships in Osijek, Croatia, Wimmer competed in the women's 10 metre air pistol event and came first with 242.3 points, ahead of Russian Vitalina Batsarashkina and French Celine Goberville who achieved 242.0 and 218.6 points respectively. Wimmer also participated on Germany's 25 metre pistol team at the championships with Doreen Vennekamp and Monika Karsch. The team won their final match against Bulgaria, clinching gold. Her gold medals granted her a quota spot at the 2020 Summer Olympics.

=== 2021 ISSF World Cup ===
At the 2021 ISSF World Cup in Osijek, Wimmer placed second in the women's 10 metre air pistol event, scoring 237.5 points, 2.5 points behind first place Bulgarian Antoaneta Kostadinova. She was also a member of Germany's women's air pistol team with Sandra Reitz and Andrea Katharina Heckner. In the gold medal match on 25 June 2021, the team ended up six points short of beating the Bulgarian team, winning the silver medal.

=== 2020 Summer Olympics ===
After her performance at the 2021 European Shooting Championships and 2021 ISSF World Cup, she qualified for the 2020 Summer Olympics in Tokyo, Japan, whose events were postponed a year due to the COVID-19 pandemic. She will compete for Germany in the women's 10 metre air pistol and the mixed 10 metre air pistol team events. Wimmer is paired in the latter event with two-time Olympic medalist Christian Reitz.
