= Golnoush Sebghatollahi =

Iranian sports shooter

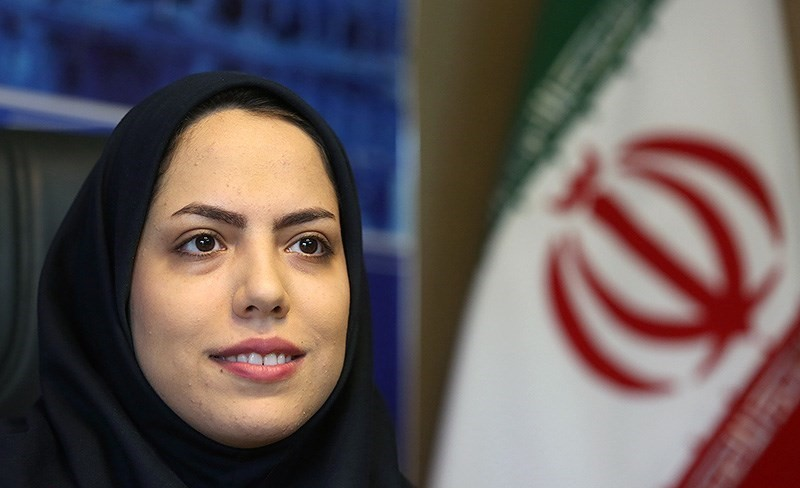

Personal information
- Born: 20 December 1990 (age 35) Isfahan, Iran
- Height: 160 cm (5 ft 3 in)
- Weight: 60 kg (132 lb)

Sport
- Country: Iran
- Sport: Sports shooting
Medal record
Women's shooting
Representing Iran
World Championships
Bronze medal – third place	2023 Baku	10m air pistol team
Bronze medal – third place	2022 Cairo	10m air pistol team
ISSF World Cup
Gold medal – first place	2022 Rio de Janeiro	10m Air Pistol Team
Silver medal – second place	2021 New Delhi	10m Air Pistol Mixed Team
Bronze medal – third place	2022 Rio de Janeiro	10m Air Pistol Mixed Team
Bronze medal – third place	2021 Osijek	10m Air Pistol Mixed Team
Asian Championships
Bronze medal – third place	2019 Doha	Air Pistol mixed team
Asian Airgun Championships
Silver medal – second place	2016 Tehran	Air Pistol team
Islamic Solidarity Games
Gold medal – first place	2017 Baku	Air Pistol

Golnoush Sebghatollahi (Persian: گلنوش سبقت‌الهی, born 20 December 1990) is an Iranian sports shooter. She competed in the women's 10 metre air pistol event at the 2016 Summer Olympics. She failed to make the final.
