= Nele Wißmer =

German sport shooter (born 1996)

Personal information
- Nationality: German
- Born: 18 December 1996 (age 29) Hanover, Germany

Sport
- Sport: Sports shooting
Medal record
Women's shooting
Representing Germany
European Championships
Gold medal – first place	2017 Baku	Skeet Team
Silver medal – second place	2023 Larnaca	Skeet Team

Nele Wißmer (born 18 December 1996) is a German sports shooter who specializes in the Skeet discipline.

== Life and career ==
Wißmer began her sports shooting career in 2014 at the hunting club in Hanover, where she was trained by Thorsten Hapke and came third in her age group at the German Championships in Munich in the same year. After being accepted into the junior squad, the first international competitions followed, where she became Vice European Champion with the team in Maribor in 2015 and seventh at the World Championships in Lonato. The following year at the European Championships in Lonato, she became double Vice European Champion in the individual and with the team, which also included Eva-Tamara Reichert and Franziska Kurzer.

After moving to the senior squad, she narrowly missed the final at the European Championships in Baku in 2017 and came seventh. In 2019 at the World Cup in Lahti, Wißmer finished fifth, but thereby won a quota place for the 2020 Summer Olympics in Tokyo for Germany. The fourth runner-up title came at the European Championships in Larnaca in 2022 with the team and at the World Championships in Osijek she narrowly missed the medal ranks with the team. In 2020 at the World Cup in Nicosia she won silver in the mixed team competition and in 2022 she won the World Cup in Baku with the team.

Wißmer also took part in the 2018 World University Championships in Kuala Lumpur, where she finished 18th, and she finished tenth at the 2019 World University Games in Naples.
