= Javad Foroughi =

Iranian sport shooter (born 1979)

Personal information
- Nationality: Iranian
- Born: 11 September 1979 (age 47) Dehloran, Iran

Sport
- Sport: Shooting
- Coached by: Mohsen Nasresfahani (National Team)
Medal record
Men's shooting
Representing Iran
Event	1st	2nd	3rd
Olympic Games	1	-	-
World Championships	-	1	1
World Cup	3	2	2
Asian Championships	2	1	5
Total	6	4	8
Olympic Games
Gold medal – first place	2020 Tokyo	10 m air pistol
World Championships
Silver medal – second place	2022 Cairo	10 m air pistol team
Bronze medal – third place	2022 Cairo	10 m air pistol mixed team
ISSF World Cup
Gold medal – first place	2021 New Delhi	10 m air pistol
Gold medal – first place	2021 Osijek	10 m air pistol
Gold medal – first place	2022 Baku	10 m air pistol team
Silver medal – second place	2021 New Dehli	10 m air pistol mixed team
Silver medal – second place	2022 Rio de Janeiro	10 m air pistol team
Bronze medal – third place	2022 Rio de Janeiro	10 m air pistol mixed team
Bronze medal – third place	2021 Osijek	10 m air pistol team
Asian Championships
Gold medal – first place	2025 Shymkent	50 m pistol
Gold medal – first place	2025 Shymkent	50 m pistol team
Silver medal – second place	2024 Jakarta	10m air pistol team
Bronze medal – third place	2019 Doha	10 m air pistol
Bronze medal – third place	2019 Doha	10 m air pistol mixed team
Bronze medal – third place	2025 Shymkent	10 m air pistol team
Bronze medal – third place	2025 Shymkent	25 m center fire pistol
Bronze medal – third place	2025 Shymkent	25 m center fire pistol team

Javad Foroughi (Persian: جواد فروغی; born 11 September 1979) is an Iranian sport shooter, born in Dehloran. He represented Iran at the 2020 Summer Olympics in Tokyo, competing in Men's 10 metre air pistol and in Mixed 10 metre air pistol team.

== Career ==
Foroughi competed in the men's 10 metre air pistol competition in the 2020 Olympics on 24 July. He qualified to the final, finishing 5th with a score of 580. In the final he started out in the lead in the 1st competition stage, scoring 101.0, a slight distance to 2nd place Pang Wei with 99.7. In the 2nd competition stage, Foroughi remained in the lead throughout the entire competition, finishing 1st and winning gold ahead of silver medalist Serbian Damir Mikec. Foroughi scored 244.8 and set a new Olympic record.

His medal was Iran's first medal in Shooting in the history of Olympics. At the age of 41, Foroughi became the oldest medalist in Iranian Olympic history. Mahmoud Namjoo had won a bronze medal at the age of 38 in 1956 Melbourne.

Foroughi is a nurse in the Islamic Revolutionary Guard Corps (IRGC) and served in Syria in 2012–13 as part of the Corps' medical deployment.

Some Iranian opposition figures decried Foroughi's Olympic medal. For example, United for Navid, a campaign set up by Iranian-American opposition figure Masih Alinejad of the VOA Persian Service after the execution of Navid Afkari, said that due to Foroughi's membership in IRGC, he "is a current and longtime member of a terrorist organization".
