= Maxim Kabatskiy =

Russian sports shooter

Personal information
- Nationality: Russian
- Born: 23 December 1996 (age 28); Moscow

Sport
- Sport: Sports shooting

Maxim Kabatskiy (born December 23, 1996) is a Russian sports shooter.
