= Azmy Mehelba =

Egyptian sport shooter (born 1991)

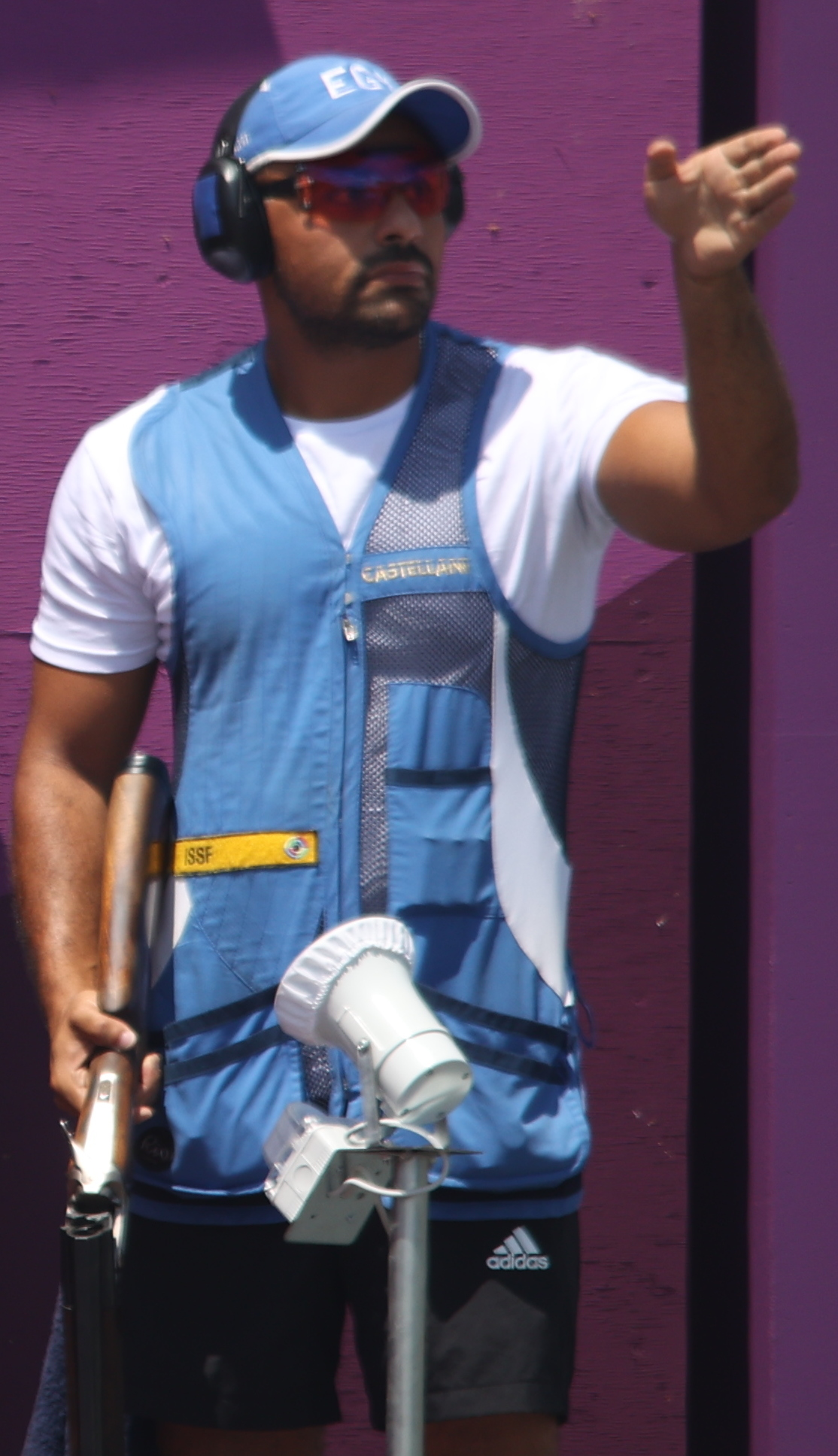
- Azmy Mehelba at the 2020 Summer Olympics

Personal information
- Born: March 26, 1991 (age 35)
Medal record
Men's shooting
Representing Egypt
World Championships
Gold medal – first place	2022 Osijek	Skeet
Silver medal – second place	2026 Doha	Skeet
Bronze medal – third place	2014 Granada	Skeet
Bronze medal – third place	2023 Baku	Skeet
World Cup Final
Silver medal – second place	2023 Doha, Qatar	Skeet
Silver medal – second place	2014 Gabala, Azerbaijan	Skeet
Bronze medal – third place	2019 Alain, Emirates	Skeet
Bronze medal – third place	2016 Rome, Italy	Skeet
Mediterranean Games
Bronze medal – third place	2022 Oran	Skeet
African Championships
Gold medal – first place	2011 Rabat	Skeet
Gold medal – first place	2014 Cairo	Skeet
Gold medal – first place	2017 Cairo	Skeet
Gold medal – first place	2023 Cairo	Skeet
World Cups
Gold medal – first place	2024 Cairo, Egypt	Skeet
Gold medal – first place	2022 Nicosia, Cyprus	Skeet
Gold medal – first place	2021 Lonato, Italy	Skeet
Silver medal – second place	2023 Rabat, Morocco	Skeet
Silver medal – second place	2018 Siggiewi, Malta	Skeet
Silver medal – second place	2016 Baku, Azerbaijan	Skeet
Bronze medal – third place	2020 Nicosia, Cyprus	Skeet
Bronze medal – third place	2019 Lahti, Finland	Skeet

Azmy Mehelba (born 26 March 1991) is an Egyptian sport Olympic shooter, who began shooting at age 11. He was selected to join the Egyptian national men skeet shooting team at the age of 14 and participated in his first international competition at age 15.

Current World ranking number 1 and World record holder 125/125 at World championship Baku 2023, he has been keeping the top of the ranking for long period. He was also ranked World number 1 and World number 2 several times before by the International Shooting Sport Federation (ISSF). He represented his country in many international competitions and has qualified for four consecutive Olympic Games, the 2012 Summer Olympics in London, the 2016 Summer Olympics in Rio de Janeiro, 2020 Summer Olympics in Tokyo and 2024 Summer Olympics in Paris. He was the first Arab & African athlete in all sports to qualify for Rio 2016 where he finished in 10th place (just one target from the finals) and Paris 2024 where he finished also in 10th place just one target from the final.

Due to his achievements, unequalled in the history of sports shooting in Egypt, the shooting range at the Alexandria shooting club has been named after him. His brother, Abdel-Aziz Mehelba, also competed for Egypt at the 2016 Summer Olympics. and 2021 Tokyo Olympic games, they also won together in world cup final Doha, Qatar 2023 Gold and Silver in trap and skeet respectively for the first time in history of shooting as two brothers winning together in same competition after they have done it before in world cup Lontao 2021 winning Gold and Bronze in Skeet and trap respectively.

== Achievements ==
Bronze medal Arab championship 2006
6th place World championship Nicosia 2007
7th place Mediterranean Games Pescara 2009
Bronze medal Grand Prix Cyprus 2010
8th place World Championship Munich 2010
Gold medal African Championship 2011 (new African record 148/150)
Gold medal teams African championship 2011
Silver medal Arab Games 2011
4th place Grand Prix Czech Republic 2012
4th place Grand Prix Serbia 2012
Participation in London Olympic Games 2012
4th place Mediterranean Games Mersin 2013
Gold medal African championship 2014
Gold medal teams African championship 2014
Gold medal Afro-Asian championship 2014
Bronze medal World championships Granada 2014 and (Olympics Quota place for Rio 2016)
Silver medal World cup final Azerbijian 2014
Gold medal in all Egyptian local competitions 2013,2014
4th place World cup Gabala 2015 ( new Egyptian, Arab and African record 124/125 )
6th place World championships lonato 2015
Bronze medal Arab championship Rabat 2015
Silver medal teams Arab championship Rabat 2015
Gold medal in all Egyptian local competitions 2016,2017
Gold medal Grandprix Cyprus 2016
6th place World cup Cyprus 2016
Gold medal Arab championship Cairo 2016
Silver medal teams Arab championship Cairo 2016
Gold medal Fazza Italian Green cup 2016 & ( World record 125/125)
Silver medal world cup Baku 2016
10th place Rio de Janeiro Olympic Games 2016
Bronze medal World cup final Rome 2016
Gold medal African championship Cairo 2017
Gold medal teams African championship Cairo 2017
Gold medal in all Egyptian local competitions 2018,2019
Silver medal World cup Malta 2018
Bronze medal Grand prix Morocco 2019
Bronze medal World cup Finland 2019 ( Olympic Quota place for Tokyo 2020 )
Bronze medal World cup final Alain 2019
Gold medal Arab championship Morocco 2020
Silver medal teams Arab championship Morocco 2020
Bronze medal Grand prix Morocco 2020
Silver medal Arab championship Cairo 2020
Silver medal teams Arab championship cairo 2020
Bronze medal World cup Nicosia 2020
5th place World cup Cairo 2021
Gold medal World cup Lonato 2021
Gold medal World cup Nicosia 2022
Bronze medal Mediterranean games Oran 2022
Gold medal Worldchampionship Osijek 2022 (Olympics Quota place for Paris 2024)
Silver medal World cup Rabat, Morocco 2023
Gold medal Qatar open Grand prix 2023
4th place World cup Doha, Qatat 2023
7th place World cup Larnaca, Cyprus 2023
6th place World cup Lonato, Italy 2023
Bronze medal World Championship Baku, Azerbaijan 2023
World record holder ( 125/125 ) World Championship Baku, Azerbaijan 2023
Gold medal African championship Cairo, Egypt 2023
Silver medal World cup final Doha, Qatar 2023
Gold medal World cup Cairo, Egypt 2024
Broze medal Amir Grand Prix Doha, Qatar 2024
5th place World Championship, Athens, Greece 2025
