= Tejaswini =

Tejaswini is an Indian feminine given name. Notable people with the name include:

- Tejaswini Kolhapure, Indian actress
- Tejaswini Ananth Kumar, Indian politician
- Tejaswini Lonari, Indian actress
- Tejaswini Manogna, Indian model
- Tejaswini Niranjana, Indian academic and author
- Tejaswini Pandit, Indian actress
- Tejaswini Prakash, Indian actress
- Tejaswini Sawant, Indian sport shooter
- Tejaswini Manogna, Indian journalist
