= Zilia Batyrshina =

Russian sport shooter

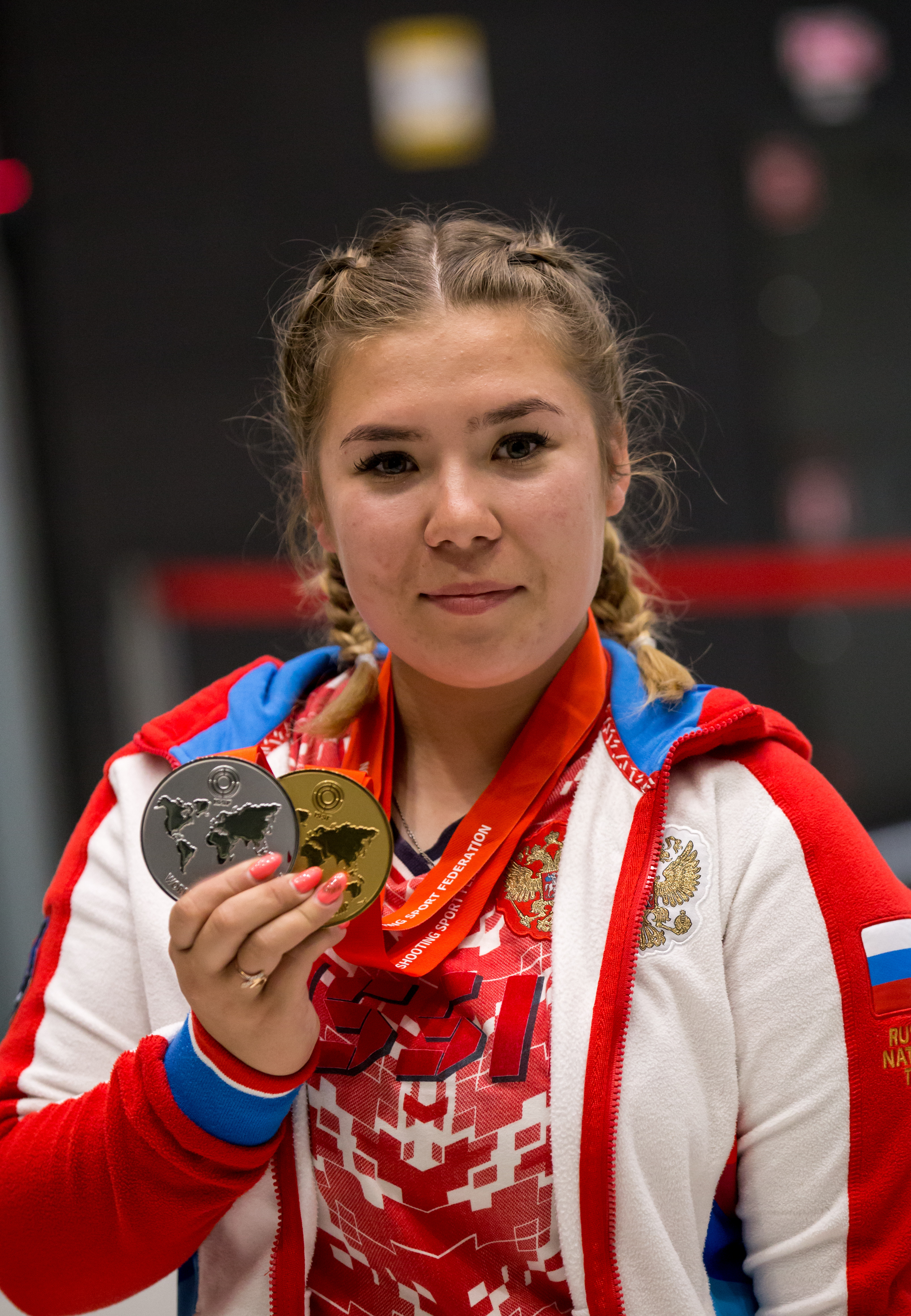

Personal information
- Nationality: Russian
- Born: 23 July 1999 (age 26) Shemordan, Tatarstan, Russia

Sport
- Sport: Shooting

Zilia Radikovna Batyrshina (Russian: Зиля Радиковна Батыршина; born 23 July 1999) is a Russian sport shooter of Tatar descent. She represented Russia at the 2020 Summer Olympics in Tokyo. She scored 38 points at the 2021 European Shooting Championships, scoring second.
