= Abdel-Aziz Mehelba =

Egyptian sports shooter

Personal information
- Born: 10 December 1988 (age 37) Alexandria, Egypt

Sport
- Sport: Sports shooting

Abdel-Aziz Mehelba (born 10 December 1988) is an Egyptian sports shooter. He competed in the men's trap event at the 2016 Summer Olympics. He was eliminated in the qualification round in which he came in 24th. He also competed at the 2020 Summer Olympics in the men's trap event and the trap mixed team event.
